= Mexican National Tag Team Championship tournament (2020) =

Mexican professional wrestling tournament

- Poster for the finals
- Promotion: Consejo Mundial de Lucha Libre
- Date: February 28, 2020; March 6, 2020; March 13, 2020
- City: Mexico City, Mexico
- Venue: Arena México

Event chronology
← Previous; Torneo de parejas familiares	Next → Homenaje a Dos Leyendas (Cancelled)

The Mexican professional wrestling company Consejo Mundial de Lucha Libre (CMLL) held a Mexican National Tag Team Championship tournament from February 28, through March 13, 2020. The tournament marked the return of the Mexican National Tag Team Championship to CMLL after a 28-year absence. A total of 16 teams competed in the tournament, with the teams of Templario/El Hijo del Villano III and Atlantis Jr./Flyer qualifying for the finals on March 13. In the end, the team of Atlantis Jr. and Flyer won the tournament to become the 42nd Mexican National Tag Team Champions.

== Production ==
=== Background ===
In 1992, then reigning Mexican National Tag Team Champions Los Destructores, left CMLL and doing so taking the championship with them to AAA. The championship was defended in AAA from 1992 until 2007, and subsequently only defended twice more on the independent circuit before becoming dormant. (Note: Last known championship defense) La Parka, one half of the last recognized championship team, died on January 11, 2020. A couple of weeks later CMLL officially announced that they had regained control of the Mexican National Tag Team Championship and would be holding a tournament for the championship in February and March. During CMLL's February 19 Informa, they announced that the first block of the tournament would take place on the February 28 Super Viernes show.

=== Storylines ===
Tournament participants - Block A

- Los Panteras (Black Panther and Blue Panther Jr.)
- Dulce Gardenia and Fuego
- Los Hijos del Infierno (Ephesto and Luciferno)
- El Hijo del Villano III and Templario
- Misterioso Jr. and El Sagrado
- Pegasso and Stigma
- Soberano Jr. and Titán
- Universo 2000 Jr. and Virus

Tournament participants - Block B

- Atlantis Jr. and Flyer
- Audaz and Fugaz
- Los Cancerberos del Infierno (Cancerbero and Raziel)
- Esfinge and Drone
- El Felino and Tiger
- Pólvora and Vangellys
- Rey Bucanero and Shocker
- Rey Cometa and Star Jr.

== Tournament brackets ==
Round of 16
Disturbio and Virus	W
Pegasso and Stigma
El Hijo del Villano III and Templario	W
Dulce Gardenia and Fuego
Black Panther and Blue Panther Jr.
Ephesto and Luciferno	W
Misterioso and El Sagrado
Soberano Jr. and Titán	W
Rey Cometa and Star Jr.	W
Pólvora and Vangellys
Atlantis Jr. and Flyer	W
Cancerbero and Raziel
Audaz and Fugaz
El Felino and Tiger	W
Rey Bucanero and Shocker	W
Esfinge and Drone

Quarterfinals
Disturbio and Virus
El Hijo del Villano III and Templario	W
Ephesto and Luciferno
Soberano Jr. and Titán	W
Atlantis Jr. and Flyer	W
Rey Cometa and Star Jr.
Rey Bucanero and Shocker
El Felino and Tiger	W

Semifinals
El Hijo del Villano III and Templario	W
Soberano Jr. and Titán
Atlantis Jr. and Flyer	W
El Felino and Tiger

Finals
El Hijo del Villano III and Templario
Atlantis Jr. and Flyer	W

== Tournament results ==
February 28 Super Viernes (Block A)

No.	Results	Stipulations	Times
1	La Ola Negra (Akuma and Espanto Jr.) defeated Halcón Suriano Jr. and Sonic	Best two-out-of-three falls tag team match	09:30
2	El Sagrado and Soberano Jr. defeated Dulce Gardenia, Luciferno, Black Panther, Stigma, El Hijo del Villano III, and Disturbio	Mexican National Tag Team Championship seeding battle royal	02:28
3	Disturbio and Virus defeated Pegasso and Stigma	Mexican National Tag Team Championship tournament eight-final	04:45
4	El Hijo del Villano III and Templario defeated Dulce Gardenia and Fuego	Mexican National Tag Team Championship tournament eight-final	06:59
5	Ephesto and Luciferno defeated Black Panther and Blue Panther Jr.	Mexican National Tag Team Championship tournament eight-final	03:30
6	Soberano Jr. and Titán defeated Misterioso and El Sagrado	Mexican National Tag Team Championship tournament eight-final	05:56
7	El Hijo del Villano III and Templario defeated Disturbio and Virus	Mexican National Tag Team Championship tournament quarterfinal	05:24
8	Soberano Jr. and Titán defeated Ephesto and Luciferno	Mexican National Tag Team Championship tournament quarterfinal	05:18
9	El Hijo del Villano III and Templario defeated Soberano Jr. and Titán	Mexican National Tag Team Championship tournament semifinal	13:43
10	El Felino, Negro Casas, and El Terrible defeated Diamante Azul and Los Hermanos Chavez (Ángel de Oro and Niebla Roja)	Best two-out-of-three falls six-man tag team match	17:25
11	Carístico and Forastero defeated Bárbaro Cavernario and Volador Jr.	2020 Torneo Nacional Increible de Parejas final, best two-out-of-three tag team match	12:19

March 6 Super Viernes (Block B)

No.	Results	Stipulations	Times
1	Mercurio and Pierrothito defeated Fantasy and Shockercito	Best two-out-of-three falls tag team match	12:44
2	Black Panther, Blue Panther Jr., and Dulce Gardenia defeated Misterioso, El Sagrado, and Virus	Best two-out-of-three falls six-man tag team match	16:29
3	Titán defeated Soberano Jr.	Lighting match, 1 fall, 10 minute time limit	09:09
4	Fugaz and Rey Bucanero defeated Tiger, Raziel, Vangellys, Flyer, Rey Cometa, and Esfinge	Mexican National Tag Team Championship seeding battle royal	02:49
5	Rey Cometa and Star Jr. defeated Pólvora and Vangellys	Mexican National Tag Team Championship tournament eight-final	06:39
6	Atlantis Jr. and Flyer defeated Los Cancerberos del Infierno (Cancerbero and Raziel)	Mexican National Tag Team Championship tournament eight-final	06:17
7	El Felino and Tiger defeated Audaz and Fugaz	Mexican National Tag Team Championship tournament eight-final	02:38
8	Rey Bucanero and Shocker defeated Esfinge and Drone	Mexican National Tag Team Championship tournament eight-final	02:47
9	Atlantis Jr. and Flyer defeated Rey Cometa and Star Jr.	Mexican National Tag Team Championship tournament quarterfinal	04:38
10	El Felino and Tiger defeated Rey Bucanero and Shocker	Mexican National Tag Team Championship tournament quarterfinal	01:23
11	Atlantis Jr. and Flyer defeated El Felino and Tiger	Mexican National Tag Team Championship tournament semifinal	07:40
12	Carístico, Valiente, and Volador Jr. defeated Bárbaro Cavernario and Los Guerreros Lagunero (Euforia and Último Guerrero)	Best two-out-of-three falls six-man tag team match	05:53

March 13 Super Viernes (finals)

No.	Results	Stipulations	Times
1	Diamond and Principe Daniel defeated El Cholo and Difunto	Best two-out-of-three falls tag team match	12:59
2	Princesa Sugehit, Silueta, and Stephanie Vaquer defeated La Amapola, La Infernal, and La Metálica	Best two-out-of-three falls six-man tag team match	14:42
3	Hechicero, Luciferno, and Rey Bucanero defeated Audaz, Rey Cometa, and Soberano Jr.	Best two-out-of-three falls six-man tag team match	14:59
4	Titán defeated Pólvora	Lightning match (One fall, 10 minute time limit)	09:46
5	Atlantis Jr. and Flyer defeated El Hijo del Villano III and Templario	Mexican National Tag Team Championship tournament final	23:19
6	El Felino, Negro Casas, and Volador Jr. defeated Carístico, Bárbaro Cavernario, and Diamante Azul	Six-man relevos increíbles match	09:08
