= Master Wato =

Japanese professional wrestler

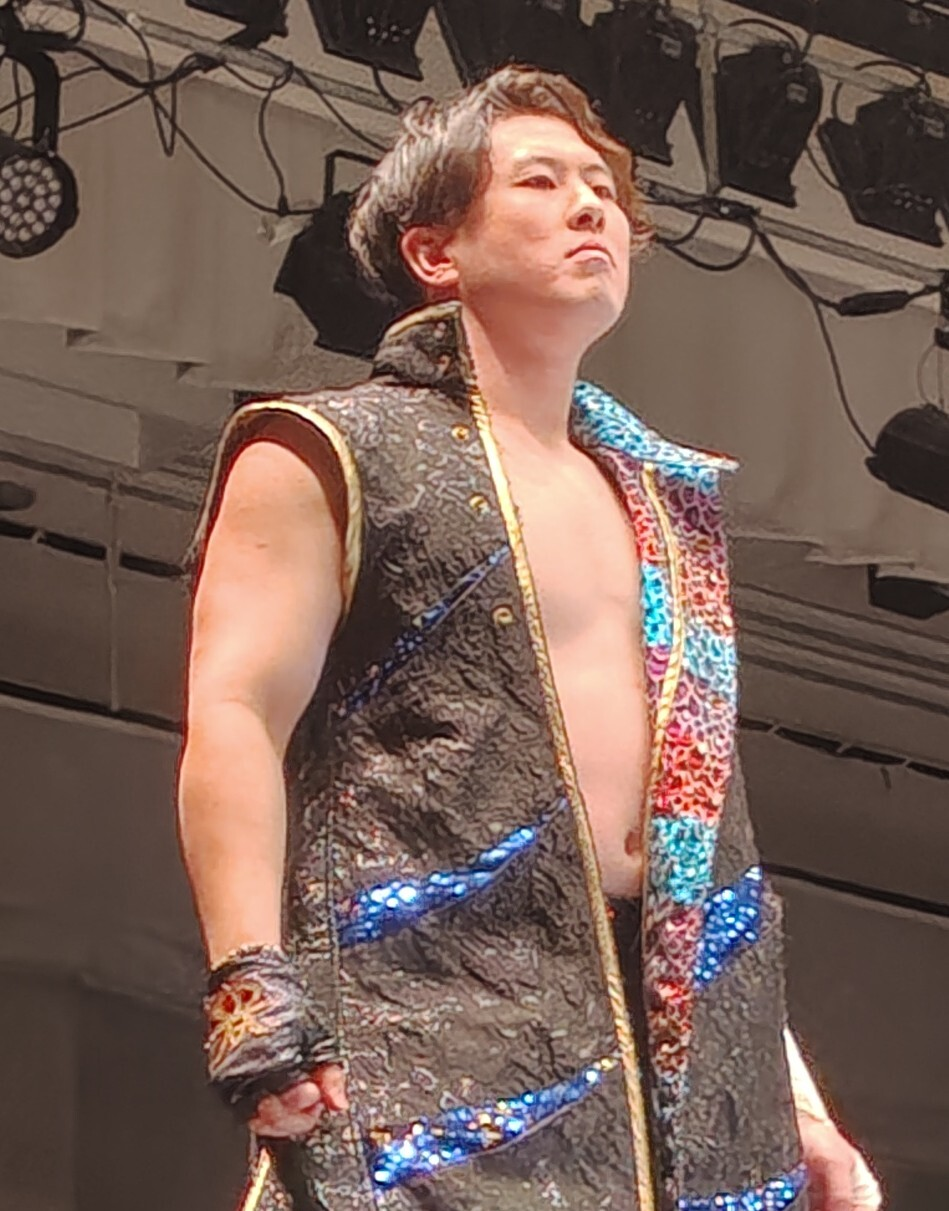
- Wato in February 2026

Personal information
- Born: Hirai Kawato; March 13, 1997 (age 29) Ikeda, Osaka, Japan

Professional wrestling career
- Ring names: Hirai Kawato; Kawato; Kawato San; Kawato-San; Master Wato
- Billed height: 177 cm (5 ft 10 in)
- Billed weight: 87 kg (192 lb)
- Trained by: Hiroshi Tanahashi; Hiroyoshi Tenzan; Junji Hirata; Jushin Thunder Liger; Kota Ibushi; NJPW Dojo; Yuji Nagata
- Debut: January 3, 2016

Hirai Kawato (川人 拓来, Kawato Hirai; born March 13, 1997) is a Japanese professional wrestler. He is signed to New Japan Pro-Wrestling (NJPW), where he performs under the ring name Master Wato (マスター・ワト Masutā Wato).

He was trained in the NJPW Noge Dojo in the Tokyo Prefecture. From 2016 until 2019 he worked as a Young Lion in NJPW, gaining in ring experience while still training. As a Young Lion he mainly faced other trainees early on, moving on to participate in various tournaments such as the 2017 Super Junior Tag Tournament (with Kushida) and finishing second in the 2017 Young Lion Cup. From 2018 to 2019, he embarked on an international learning excursion with NJPW's Mexican partner Consejo Mundial de Lucha Libre (CMLL) under the ring name Kawato-San (or Kawato San), where he became a one-time CMLL World Lightweight Champion and competed in the main event of CMLL's 2020 Sin Piedad supercard show. He returned to NJPW in 2020 as Master Wato, where he became a two-time IWGP Junior Heavyweight Tag Team Champion, a one-time NEVER Openweight 6-Man Tag Team Champion, and the winner of the 2023 Best of the Super Juniors tournament.

== Professional wrestling career ==
=== New Japan Pro-Wrestling (2015–present) ===
==== Young Lion and excursion (2015–2020) ====
Kawato started working for New Japan Pro-Wrestling (NJPW) in April 2015, training in their dojo for his in-ring career as a Young Lion. He wore simple black trunks and boots as he worked with other NJPW Young Lions and experienced veterans as part of his training. On January 3, 2016, Kawato made his in-ring debut, losing to fellow Young Lion Yohei Komatsu. Throughout most of the year, he worked opening and undercard matches, primarily facing fellow Young Lion Teruaki Kanemitsu. On October 23, Kawato won his first singles match, defeating Bone Solder by disqualification.

At The New Beginning in Sapporo on February 5, 2017, Kawato replaced an injured David Finlay, teaming with Kushida in a loss to Suzuki-gun (El Desperado and Yoshinobu Kanemaru). On March 7, he, Finlay, Manabu Nakanishi and Ryusuke Taguchi defeated TenCozy (Hiroyoshi Tenzan and Satoshi Kojima), Jyushin Thunder Liger and Tomoyuki Oka in the opening match of the NJPW 45th Anniversary show in Korakuen Hall. Kawato and Yoshitatsu defeated Katsuya Kitamura and Oka in the non-televised dark match of Wrestling Dontaku 2017 on May 3. On June 20, Kawato was involved in his first higher card match, as he and Hiroshi Tanahashi lost to Los Ingobernables de Japón ("The Ungovernables from Japan"; Hiromu Takahashi and Tetsuya Naito). In October, Kawato and Kushida took part in the 2017 Super Junior Tag Tournament, where they were defeated in the first round by Roppongi 3K (Sho and Yoh (Note: previously worked under the name "Yohei Komatsu")).

From October 12 to December 21, Kawato took part in the 2017 Young Lion Cup, where he finished in second place with a record of four wins (defeating Oka, Shota Umino, Ren Narita, and Tetsuhiro Yagi) and one loss to tournament winner Kitamura. Kawato competed on all eight days of the 2018 Fantastica Mania tour, a series of shows in Japan co-promoted by NJPW and the Mexican-based promotion Consejo Mundial de Lucha Libre (CMLL). Each night, Kawato and various tag team partners faced, and lost to, members of Los Ingobernables de Japón. His final match of the tour, and for NJPW at the time, saw him team with Mexican wrestler Atlantis in a loss to Bárbaro Cavernario and Gedo on January 22.

==== Master Wato (2020–present) ====
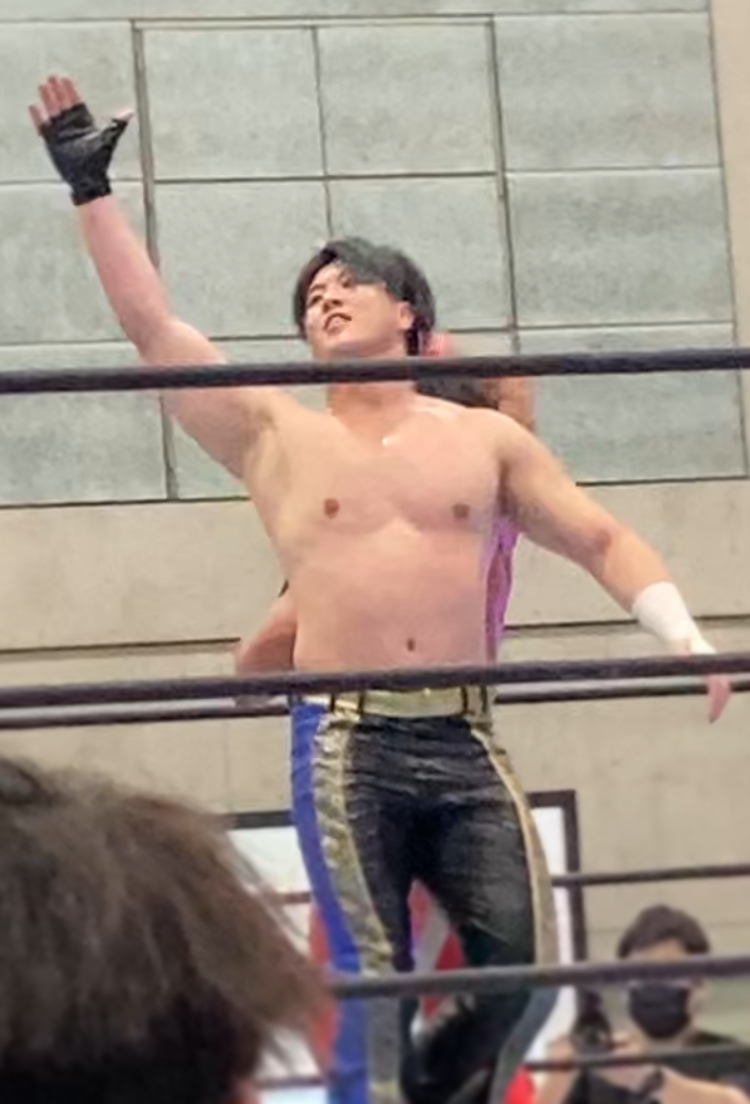
Master Wato in April 2023

Kawato, now sporting blue hair, returned from his excursion on July 3, 2020, under the name Master Wato, where he was attacked by Douki. He defeated Douki at the New Japan Cup finals in Osaka-jō Hall on June 11, after which he was attacked by Kanemaru. The next night at Dominion in Osaka-jo Hall, he, Tenzan and Yuya Uemura lost to Douki, El Desperado and Kanemaru. At Summer Struggle in Jingu Stadium on August 29, Wato lost to Kanemaru. They were scheduled for a rematch when Wato entered the Best of the Super Juniors tournament in November, but Kanemaru pulled out due to injury. He finished the tournament with four wins and five losses, failing to advance to the finals. At Wrestle Kingdom 15 on January 5, 2021, Wato and Taguchi unsuccessfully challenged El Desperado and Kanemaru for the IWGP Junior Heavyweight Tag Team Championship. He also failed to win a Ranbo for the provisional KOPW 2021 Trophy on July 25 at Wrestle Grand Slam in Tokyo Dome. Later that year, Wato entered the Best of The Super Juniors; with a total of eight points after four wins and seven losses, he failed to advance to the finals.

On Night 2 of Wrestle Kingdom 16 on January 5, 2022, Wato submitted IWGP Junior Heavyweight Champion El Desperado in a six-man tag team match, earning himself a title match, which he lost on February 11. Eight days later, he and Taguchi, known as Six or Nine, won the IWGP Junior Tag Team Championship in a fatal four-way tag team match, marking Wato's first championship in New Japan Pro-Wrestling. The following month, despite being a junior heavyweight, Wato competed in the heavyweight-oriented New Japan Cup, where he received a bye to the second round and lost to Kazuchika Okada. Six or Nine made their first successful title defense against Bullet Club's Cutest Tag Team (El Phantasmo and Taiji Ishimori) at Hyper Battle on April 9. At Wrestling Dontaku 2022 on May 1, they defeated Douki and Kanemaru to retain the titles. After losing a non-title match to United Empire's TJP and Francesco Akira the following month, Wato and Taguchi lost the titles in a rematch on June 20, ending their reign at 121 days. Six or Nine failed to regain the titles from TJP and Akira on September 25 at Burning Spirit.

At Declaration of Power on October 10, Wato defeated IWGP Junior Heavyweight Champion Ishimori in a non-title match. However, he failed to win the title at Wrestle Kingdom 17 on January 4, 2023, in a four-way match also involving El Desperado and Hiromu Takahashi, who won the title. From February 22 to 28, he participated in all six nights of the revived NJPW and CMLL co-promoted Fantastica Mania 2023 tour. In May, Wato would take part in the Best of the Super Juniors as part of the B Block. He finished joint top of the block with 14 points; after defeating Mike Bailey in the semi-finals, Wato defeated Titán in the finals on May 28 to win the tournament. As a result, Wato received an IWGP Junior Heavyweight Championship match against Takahashi at Dominion 6.4 in Osaka-jo Hall on June 4, but was defeated. On January 23, 2024, Wato announced that he tore his anterior cruciate ligament and would need surgery, sidelining him for an unknown period of time.

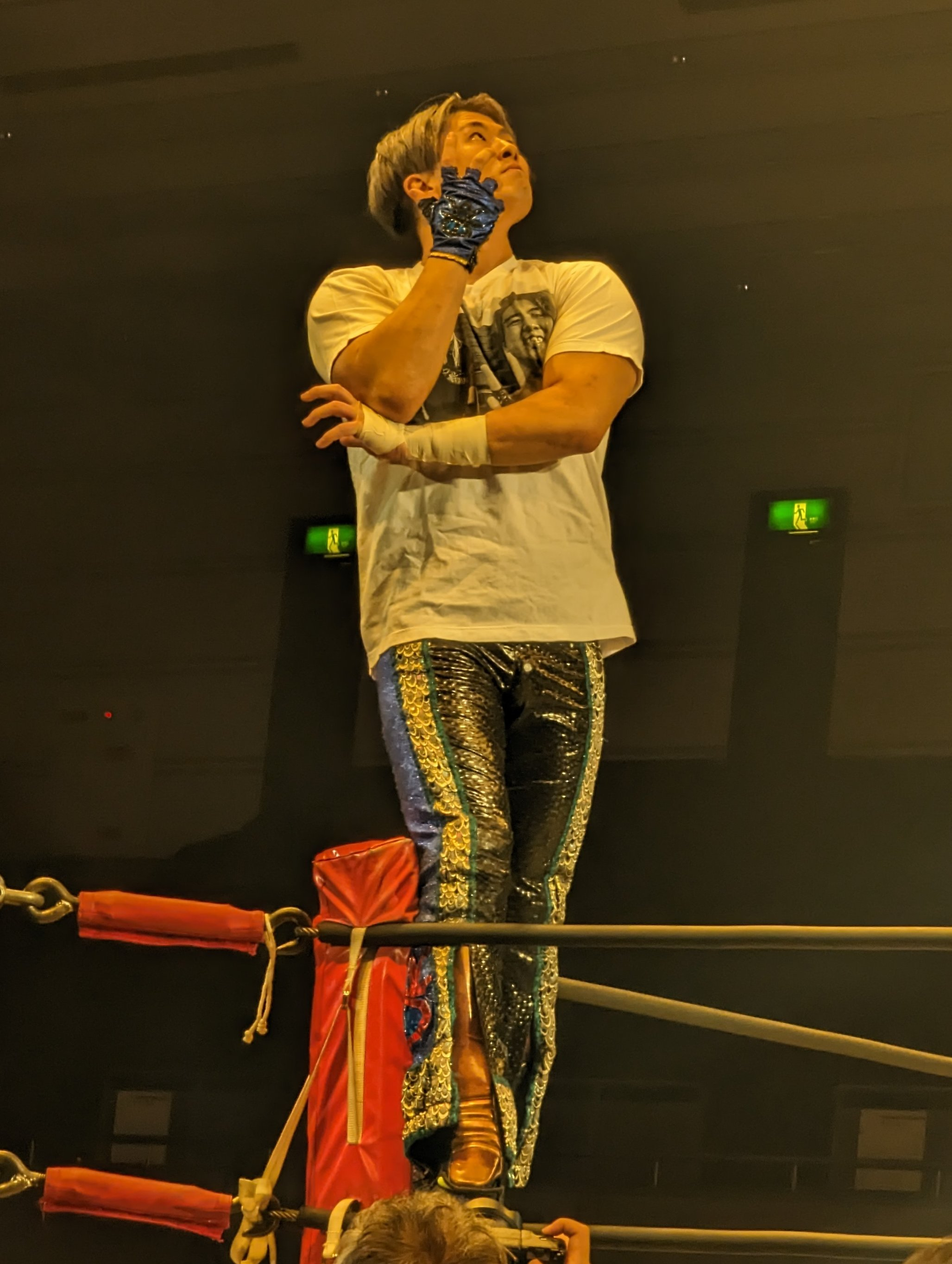
Wato in November 2023

Wato returned from injury at King of Pro-Wrestling on October 14, saving IWGP Junior Heavyweight Champion Douki from an attack by Kanemaru. On November 4, he unsuccessfully challenged Douki for his title at Power Struggle. At Wrestling Hizen no Kuni on April 29, 2025, Wato and Yoh defeated Ichiban Sweet Boys (Kosei Fujita and Robbie Eagles) to win the IWGP Junior Heavyweight Tag Team Championship, but lost it in their first defense to Douki and Sho at Dominion 6.15 in Osaka-jo Hall on June 15. On July 4, Wato, Toru Yano and Yoh defeated Sho, Ren Narita and Yujiro Takahashi for the NEVER Openweight 6-Man Tag Team Championship, which they lost in a Ranbo on January 4, 2026, at Wrestle Kingdom 20. At Sakura Genesis on April 4, he and Togi Makabe lost to TMDK (Hartley Jackson and Fujita). Wato was also announced as a participant in Block A of the Best of the Super Juniors. He topped his block and advanced to the semi-finals, where he lost to Yoh.

=== Consejo Mundial de Lucha Libre (2018–2020) ===
On January 9, 2018, CMLL announced on Twitter that Kawato would begin his excursion with them at the end of the month, and would actively compete in the promotion after taking part in NJPW's Fantastica Mania events. In his first CMLL match, on February 2, Kawato, now billed as "Kawato San" (sometimes written as "Kawato-San"), teamed with Misterioso Jr. and Virus in a disqualification loss to Audaz, Pegasso and Rey Cometa, after Virus unmasked Audaz. CMLL also allowed him to wrestle on the Mexican independent circuit; his first independent circuit match was a loss to Ricky Marvin at a Lucha Memes show on March 11.

That same month, Kawato San was paired with Okumura, CMLL's Japanese liaison, to form a team called Eje del Mal ("Axis of Evil"), presenting them as a group of "evil foreigners". Their first match saw the two, and Johnny Idol, lose to Cometa, Guerrero Maya Jr. and Stuka Jr. He was one of twelve wrestlers in a torneo cibernetico elimination match to determine the challenger for the Rey del Inframundo ("King of the Underworld") championship on October 26, but was the first man eliminated by Tritón. On November 16, he was invited to participate in the semi-final of the Leyenda de Plata ("The Silver Legend"), one of CMLL's most prestigious tournaments, but was the first man eliminated by Audaz about eight minutes in. On January 6, 2019, Kawato San competed in the Reyes del Aire ("Kings of the Air") tournament, eliminating Audaz before he and Tritón proceeded to eliminate each other. Just over a year after his debut, on May 31, Kawato San wrestled in the opening match of his first major CMLL show, Juicio Final ("Final Judgment"), teaming with Disturbio and Misterioso Jr. in a loss to Blue Panther Jr., Black Panther and Cometa.

On June 23, Kawato San and Audaz outlasted Eléctrico, El Hijo del Villano III, Flyer, Halcón Suriano Jr., Príncipe Diamante, Star Jr., and Súper Astro Jr. to earn a match for the vacant CMLL World Super Lightweight Championship. The following week, on June 30, Kawato San defeated Audaz to become the new champion. He did not wrestle after July 28, due to what was later revealed to be a knee injury. It was announced on November 6 that Kawato San had returned to Mexico after recovering from the injury, which stripped him of the title. He returned to action three days later, as he, El Felino and Rey Bucanero lost to Atlantis Jr., Ángel de Oro and Niebla Roja. In late October, Kawato San and Dulce Gardenia became involved in a storyline feud, as the two fought in six-man tag team matches throughout November and December. The feud culminated in a hair vs. hair Lucha de Apuestas ("bet match") in the main event of Sin Piedad ("No Mercy") on January 1, 2020, which Gardenia won two-falls-to-one, forcing Kawato San to have all of his hair shaved off. Later that month, he competed in that year's Reyes del Aire, eliminating Drone before being the sixth wrestler eliminated by Cometa. Kawato San wrestled his final match in CMLL on January 31, where he, Okumura and Virus defeated Diamond, Drone and Fuego.

=== Ring of Honor (2023) ===
Wato appeared for Ring of Honor (ROH) at Death Before Dishonor on July 21, 2023, where he, Ryusuke Taguchi and Leon Ruffin unsuccessfully challenged Mogul Embassy (Brian Cage, Bishop Kaun and Toa Liona) for the ROH World Six-Man Tag Team Championship.

=== Return to CMLL (2026) ===
As Master Wato, he returned to CMLL at the Lucha Kingdom event, co-promoted with NJPW, on November 16, 2026. In the opening match, he, Okumura and Yoh lost to Brillante Jr., Capitán Suicida and Rey Pegasus.

== Championships and accomplishments ==
- Consejo Mundial de Lucha Libre
  - CMLL World Lightweight Championship (1 time)
- New Japan Pro-Wrestling
  - IWGP Junior Heavyweight Tag Team Championship (2 times) – with Ryusuke Taguchi (1) and Yoh (1)
  - NEVER Openweight 6-Man Tag Team Championship (1 time) – with Toru Yano and Yoh
  - Best of the Super Juniors (2023)
- Pro Wrestling Illustrated
  - Ranked No. 233 of the top 500 singles wrestlers in the PWI 500 in 2026

== Luchas de Apuestas record ==
Winner (wager)	Loser (wager)	Location	Event	Date	Notes
Dulce Gardenia (hair)	Kawato-San (hair)	Mexico City	Sin Piedad	January 1, 2020	
