= Dulce Gardenia =

Mexican professional wrestler

Personal information
- Born: Javier Márquez Gómez; January 30, 1992 (age 34) Vado del Río Nazas, Coahuila, Mexico
- Children: 3

Professional wrestling career
- Ring name: Dulce Gardenia
- Billed height: 1.78 m (5 ft 10 in)
- Billed weight: 81 kg (179 lb)
- Trained by: Águila Roja; Cóndor de Oro; Gran Markus; Halcón Suriano; Kaín; Último Dragón; Último Guerrero
- Debut: 2013

Javier Márquez Gómez (born January 30, 1992), better known by his ring name Dulce Gardenia, is a Mexican professional wrestler working for Consejo Mundial de Lucha Libre (CMLL) as a técnico ("good guy") wrestling character. He is a member of Atrapasueños alongside Espíritu Negro and Rey Cometa, with whom he won the Mexican National Trios Championship. He is also a former Occidente Tag Team Champion with La Fashion. He has also wrestled in Japan for New Japan Pro-Wrestling (NJPW).

As Gardenia, Márquez portrays an exótico character, who is presented as effeminate and homosexual in the ring. His ring name is in part an homage to Dizzy Gardenia, who was one of the earliest exótico wrestlers in the 1940s.

== Professional wrestling career ==
Márquez initially trained under Kaín in Torreón, making his in-ring debut in 2013. He took the ring name "Dulce Gardenia" ("Sweet Gardenia") in part as a tribute to Dizzy Gardenia (real name Sterling Davis), one of the original exótico characters in the 1940s. He kept training while gaining in-ring experience as well, learning from Águila Roja, Cóndor de Oro, Gran Markus and Halcón Suriano. He later met Último Guerrero, who felt that Márquez was wasting his time working locally in Torreón, and invited him to Mexico City to train at Consejo Mundial de Lucha Libre's (CMLL; "World Wrestling Council") wrestling school.

In 2019, Márquez, under the ring name "Charro del Mysterio", was scheduled to wrestle Silver King during a tour of the United Kingdom, but missed the flight due to issues with his visa documentation. He ended up missing the tour, where Silver King would die during a match.

=== Consejo Mundial de Lucha Libre (2019–present) ===
==== Beginnings (2019–2022) ====
Dulce Gardenia made his CMLL in-ring debut in a six-man tag team match at Arena Coliseo on June 15, 2019, where he, Drone and Fuego lost to Misterioso Jr., Pólvora and Virus. Shortly after, on June 28, he made his highly publicized television debut on Super Viernes at Arena México, winning a singles match over Disturbio that was presented as part of CMLL's LGBTQ+ celebration, and featured an in-ring endorsement by Sofia Alonso, the daughter of CMLL owner Paco Alonso. On September 27, at the CMLL 86th Anniversary Show, Gardenia, Diamante Azul and Titán defeated El Hijo del Villano III, Hechicero and Rey Bucanero by disqualification at CMLL's biggest show of the year. On October 4, Gardenia was paired with Volador Jr. for the Torneo Gran Alternativa ("Great Alternative Tournament"), a tag team tournament where a rookie teams with a veteran. They defeated Espíritu Negro and Mr. Niebla in the first round and El Coyote and El Terrible in the quarter-finals, before losing to Fugaz and Místico in the semi-finals.

During this time, Gardenia entered a storyline feud with Kawato-San; they both agreed to "bet" their hair in a Lucha de Apuestas ("bet match") in the main event of Sin Piedad ("No Mercy") on January 1, 2020, where Gardenia defeated Kawato-San two falls to one, forcing Kawato-San to shave his hair. The following month, he was forced to team with Okumura as part of the Torneo Nacional de Parejas Increíbles ("National Incredible Pairs Tournament"), but lost to Felino and Niebla Roja in the first round. On February 28, Gardenia and Fuego lost to El Hijo del Villano III and Templario in the first round of a tournament for the reintroduced Mexican National Tag Team Championship. In the main event of Sin Salida ("No Escape") on January 1, 2022, Gardenia placed his hair on the line in an eleven-man steel cage match held under Lucha de Apuestas rules. In the end, he defeated Disturbio, the last wrestler remaining in the cage, to shave him bald in the process.

==== Atrapasueños (2022–present) ====
Four months later, Gardenia began an alliance with Espíritu Negro and Rey Cometa, known collectively as Atrapasueños ("Dreamcatchers"). On May 27, they defeated Los Depredadores (Magia Blanca, Magnus and Rugido), La Fuerza Poblana (Arkalis, Guerrero Maya Jr. and Stigma) and OneAtos (Esfinge, Fugaz and Star Black) in a four-way elimination match to win the vacant Mexican National Trios Championship. Gardenia competed in the semi-final torneo cibernetico of the Leyenda de Plata ("The Blue Legend") tournament on July 22, but was the third wrestler eliminated by Fugaz. At the CMLL 89th Anniversary Show on September 16, Atrapasueños successfully defended the title against La Fuerza Poblana. At Noche de Campeones ("Night of Champions") on September 30, Gardenia and Negro unsuccessfully challenged Ángel de Oro and Niebla Roja for the CMLL World Tag Team Championship. On April 14, 2023, Gardenia was involved in the ten-way elimination semi-finals of the Universal Championship tournament, where he was the third wrestler eliminated by Esfinge. At Noche de Campeones on September 29, Atrapasueños lost the Mexican National Trios Championship to Los Indestructibles (Apocalipsis, Cholo and Disturbio).

Gardenia began 2024 by teaming with La Fashion on January 2 to win the Occidente Tag Team Championship, defeating Furia Roja and Guerrero de la Muerte. He and Akuma lost to Máscara Dorada and Rocky Romero in the first round of that year's Torneo Nacional de Parejas Increíbles on March 15. On April 26, Gardenia lost his hair to Akuma in the finals of a four-way elimination match, having previously eliminated Disturbio and Virus. On September 6, he competed in the semi-final torneo cibernetico of the Copa Independencia ("Independence Cup") tournament, but was the second wrestler eliminated by Dark Panther.

=== New Japan Pro-Wrestling (2020–2023) ===
In January 2020, Gardenia made his debut for New Japan Pro-Wrestling (NJPW) during the CMLL and NJPW co-promoted Fantastica Mania 2020 tour. He returned to Japan in February 2023 for the revived Fantastica Mania 2023 tour. Gardenia and Cometa participated in a faction tag team tournament, losing to Los Ingobernables de Japón (BUSHI and Titán) in the first round, as well as Los Depredadores (Magia Blanca and Volador Jr.) in the third place match.

== Personal life ==
Márquez is a single father of three, living in Torreón.

== Championships and accomplishments ==
- Consejo Mundial de Lucha Libre
  - Mexican National Trios Championship (1 time) – with Espíritu Negro and Rey Cometa
  - Occidente Tag Team Championship (1 time) – with La Fashion
  - Lucha De Naciones 2026

== Luchas de Apuestas record ==
Winner (wager)	Loser (wager)	Location	Event	Date	Notes
Dulce Gardenia (hair)	Kawato-San (hair)	Mexico City	Sin Piedad	January 1, 2020	
Dulce Gardenia (hair)	Disturbio (hair)	Mexico City	Sin Salida	January 1, 2022	(Note: Steel cage match that also included Okumura, Nitro, Pegasso, Stigma, Akuma, Espíritu Negro, Sangre Imperial, Audaz and El Coyote)
Akuma (hair)	Dulce Gardenia (hair)	Mexico City	Arena México 68th Anniversary Show	April 26, 2024	
