= CMLL Torneo Nacional de Parejas Increíbles (2020) =

Mexican professional wrestling tournament

- Poster for the finals of the tournament on February 28
- Promotion: Consejo Mundial de Lucha Libre
- Date: February 14, 2020; February 21, 2020; February 28, 2020
- City: Mexico City, Mexico
- Venue: Arena México

Event chronology
← Previous; La Noche de Mr. Niebla	Next → Torneo de parejas familiares

Torneo Nacional de Parejas Increíbles tournaments chronology
← Previous; 2019	Next → —

The CMLL Torneo Nacional de Parejas Increíbles (2020) or the National Incredible Pairs Tournament (2020) was the 2020 version of an annual professional wrestling tag team tournament held by the Mexican wrestling promotion Consejo Mundial de Lucha Libre (CMLL). The tournament is based on the Lucha Libre Parejas Increíbles match concept, which pairs two wrestlers of opposite allegiance, one portraying a rudo, the antagonists of professional wrestling, and one portraying a técnicotécnico, the protagonist of professional wrestling

The 2020 version of the tournament is the eleventh year in a row that CMLL held the tournament since the first tournament in 2010. The winners are presented with a trophy but not given any other tangible reward for the victory. The tournament started with the first block of eight teams on February 14, 2020, and ran over three Super Viernes shows. In the end, the team of Carístico and Forastero defeated Bárbaro Cavernario and Volador Jr. to win the tournament.

== History ==
The Mexican professional wrestling promotion Consejo Mundial de Lucha Libre (CMLL; "World Wrestling Council") held their first Torneo Nacional de Parejas Increíbles ("National Incredible Pairs Tournament") in 2010, from January 22 through February 5, marking the beginning of what became an annual tournament. CMLL has previous held Parejas Increíbles tournaments on an irregular basis and often promoted individual Parejas Increíbles and Relevos Increíbles ("Incredible Relay", with teams of three or more wrestlers). The Parejas Increíbles concept is a long-standing tradition in lucha libre and is at times referred to as a "strange bedfellows" match in English speaking countries, because a Pareja Increible consists of a face (referred to as a técnico in Lucha Libre, or a "good guy") and a heel (a rudo, those that portray "the bad guys") teamed up for a specific match, or in this case for a tournament. The 2020 tournament will be the eleventh annual Parejas Increíbles tournament, and like its predecessors held as part of CMLL's regular Friday night CMLL Super Viernes ("Super Friday") shows.

== Tournament background ==
The tournament itself featured 15 professional wrestling matches with different wrestlers teaming up, some of whom were involved in pre-existing scripted feuds or storylines while others were simply paired up for the tournament. For the Torneo Nacional de Parejas Increíbles tournaments, CMLL often teamed up a técnico (those that portray the "good guys" in wrestling, also known as faces) and a rudo (the "bad guy" or heels). who are involved in a pre-existing storyline feud at the time of the tournament so that the tournament itself can be used as a storytelling device to help tell the story of escalating confrontations between two feuding wrestlers. The tournament format follows CMLL's traditional tournament formats, with two qualifying blocks of eight teams that competed during the first and second week of the tournament and a final match between the two block winners. The qualifying blocks are all one-fall matches while the tournament final will be a best two-out-of-three-falls tag team match.

=== Tournament participants ===
Key

Symbol	Meaning
(T)	This wrestler is a Face, or Técnico.
(R)	This wrestler is a Heel, or Rudo.

Block A

- Bandido (T) and Último Guerrero (R)
- Carístico (T) and Forastero (R)
- Diamante Azul (T) and Gilbert el Boricua (R)
- Dulce Gardenia (T) and Okumura (R)
- Flyer (T) and Hechicero (R)
- Guerrero Maya Jr. (T) and Universo 2000 Jr. (R)
- Niebla Roja (T) and El Felino (R)
- Titán (T) and Mephisto (R)

Block B

- Ángel de Oro (T) and Sansón (R)
- Atlantis Jr. (T) and Negro Casas (R)
- Blue Panther (T) and Fuerza Guerrera (R)
- Rey Cometa (T) and Espíritu Negro (R)
- Soberano Jr. (T) and Templario (R)
- Stuka Jr. (T) and Gran Guerrero (R)
- Valiente (T) and El Cuatrero (R)
- Volador Jr. (T) and Bárbaro Cavernario (R)

== Tournament brackets ==
Round of 16
Diamante Azul and Gilbert el Boricua	W
Guerrero Maya Jr. and Universo 2000 Jr.	09:03
Flyer and Hechicero	04:47
Bandido and Último Guerrero	W
Mephisto and Titán	05:28
Carístico and Forastero	W
Dulce Gardenia and Okumura	06:02
El Felino and Niebla Roja	W
Gran Guerrero and Stuka Jr.	W
Blue Panther and Fuerza Guerrera	07:26
Ángel de Oro and Sansón	W
Espíritu Negro and Rey Cometa	06:00
Atlantis Jr. and Negro Casas	W
El Cuatrero and Valiente	05:00
Bárbaro Cavernario and Volador Jr.	W
Soberano Jr. and Templario	03:52

Quarterfinals
Azul and Gilbert	03:38
Bandido and Guerrero	W
Carístico and Forastero	W
El Felino and Niebla Roja	03:53
Gran G. and Stuka Jr.	05:08
Ángel and Sansón	W
Atlantis Jr. and Casas	02:39
Bárbaro Cavernario and Volador Jr.	W

Semifinals
Bandido and Guerrero	07:11
Carístico and Forastero	W
Ángel and Sansón	07:35
Cavernario and Volador Jr.	W

Finals
Carístico and Forastero	W
Cavernario and Volador Jr

== Tournament shows ==
February 14, 2020

No.	Results	Stipulations	Times
1	Los Cancerberos del Infierno (Cancerbero and Raziel) defeated Eléctrico and Oro Jr.	Best two-out-of-three falls tag team match	14:46
2	La Amapola, Dalys, and Reyna Isis defeated Marcela, Princesa Sugehit, and Tsukushi	Best two-out-of-three falls six-woman tag team match	17:35
3	Atlantis Jr., Valiente, and Volador Jr. defeated Negro Casas and Los Guerreros Laguneros (Euforia and Gran Guerrero)	Best two-out-of-three falls six-man tag team match	08:55
4	El Felino and Okumura defeated Forastero, Gilbert el Boricua, Hechicero, Mephisto, Último Guerrero, Universo 2000 Jr.	8-man Torneo Nacional de Parejas Increíbles seeding battle royal	03:25
5	Diamante Azul and Gilbert el Boricua defeated Guerrero Maya Jr. and Universo 2000 Jr.	Torneo Nacional de Parejas Increíbles first round match	09:03
6	Bandido and Último Guerrero defeated Flyer and Hechicero	Torneo Nacional de Parejas Increíbles first round match	04:47
7	Carístico and Forastero defeated Titán and Mephisto	Torneo Nacional de Parejas Increíbles first round match	05:28
8	Niebla Roja and El Felino defeated Dulce Gardenia and Okumura	Torneo Nacional de Parejas Increíbles first round match	06:02
9	Bandido and Último Guerrero defeated Diamante Azul and Gilbert el Boricua	Torneo Nacional de Parejas Increíbles quarterfinal match	03:38
10	Carístico and Forastero defeated Niebla Roja and El Felino	Torneo Nacional de Parejas Increíbles quarterfinal match	03:53
11	Carístico and Forastero defeated Bandido and Último Guerrero	Torneo Nacional de Parejas Increíbles semifinal match	07:11

February 21, 2020

No.	Results	Stipulations	Times
1	Magnus and Retro defeated La Ola Negra (Akuma and Espanto Jr.)	Best two-out-of-three falls tag team match	12:08
2	Dalys, La Metálica, and Reyna Isis defeated Marcela, Mystique, and Sanely	Six-woman "Lucha Libre rules" tag team match	13:49
3	Blue Panther Jr. defeated Vangellys	Lightning match (One fall, 10 minute time limit)	07:09
4	Carístico, Diamante Azul, and Titán defeated El Terrible and Los Hijos del Infierno (Ephesto and Mephisto)	Six-man "Lucha Libre rules" tag team match	15:30
5	Soberano Jr. and Volador Jr. defeated Blue Panther, Ángel de Oro, Atlantis Jr., Valiente, Stuka Jr., and Rey Cometa	2020 Torneo Nacional de Parejas Increíbles seeding battle royal	02:00
6	Gran Guerrero and Stuka Jr. defeated Blue Panther and Fuerza Guerrera	2020 Torneo Nacional de Parejas Increíbles eight-final match	07:26
7	Ángel de Oro and Sansón defeated Espíritu Negro and Rey Cometa	2020 Torneo Nacional de Parejas Increíbles eight-final match	06:00
8	Atlantis Jr. and Negro Casas defeated El Cuatrero and Valiente	2020 Torneo Nacional de Parejas Increíbles eight-final match	05:00
9	Bárbaro Cavernario and Volador Jr. defeated Soberano Jr. and Templario	2020 Torneo Nacional de Parejas Increíbles eight-final match	03:52
10	Ángel de Oro and Sansón defeated Gran Guerrero and Stuka Jr.	2020 Torneo Nacional de Parejas Increíbles quarterfinal match	05:08
11	Bárbaro Cavernario and Volador Jr. defeated Atlantis Jr. and Negro Casas	2020 Torneo Nacional de Parejas Increíbles quarterfinal match	02:39
12	Bárbaro Cavernario and Volador Jr. defeated Ángel de Oro and Sansón	2020 Torneo Nacional de Parejas Increíbles semifinal match	07:35

February 27

No.	Results	Stipulations
1	La Ola Negra (Akuma and Espanto Jr.) defeated Halcón Suriano Jr. and Sonic	Best two-out-of-three falls tag team match
2	El Sagrado and Soberano Jr. defeated Dulce Gardenia, Luciferno, Black Panther, Stigma, El Hijo del Villano III, and Disturbio	Mexican National Tag Team Championship seeding battle royal
3	Disturbio and Virus defeated Pegasso and Stigma	Mexican National Tag Team Championship tournament eight-final
4	El Hijo del Villano III and Templario defeated Dulce Gardenia and Fuego	Mexican National Tag Team Championship tournament eight-final
5	Ephesto and Luciferno defeated Black Panther and Blue Panther Jr.	Mexican National Tag Team Championship tournament eight-final
6	Soberano Jr. and Titán defeated Misterioso and El Sagrado	Mexican National Tag Team Championship tournament eight-final
7	El Hijo del Villano III and Templario defeated Disturbio and Virus	Mexican National Tag Team Championship tournament quarterfinal
8	Soberano Jr. and Titán defeated Ephesto and Luciferno	Mexican National Tag Team Championship tournament quarterfinal
9	El Hijo del Villano III and Templario defeated Soberano Jr. and Titán	Mexican National Tag Team Championship tournament semifinal
10	El Felino, Negro Casas, and El Terrible defeated Diamante Azul and Los Hermanos Chavez (Ángel de Oro and Niebla Roja)	Best two-out-of-three falls six-man tag team match
11	Carístico and Forastero defeated Bárbaro Cavernario and Volador Jr.	2020 Torneo Nacional Increible de Parejas final, best two-out-of-three tag team match
