= Sin Piedad (2020) =

2020 Consejo Mundial de Lucha Libre wrestling show

- Official poster for the event
- Promotion: Consejo Mundial de Lucha Libre
- Date: January 1, 2020
- City: Mexico City, Mexico
- Venue: Arena México

Pay-per-view chronology
← Previous; La Copa Junior	Next → Fantastica Mania

Sin Piedad chronology
← Previous; 2019	Next → —

Sin Piedad (2020) (Spanish for "No Mercy") was a major professional wrestling supercard show, produced and scripted by the Mexican Lucha Libre promotion Consejo Mundial de Lucha Libre (CMLL). The Sin Piedad show tookplace on January 1, 2020 in Arena México, Mexico City, Mexico. The 2020 Sin Piedad was the 15th event under the Sin Piedad name and the fifth year in a row CMLL has held the show on New Year's Day.

In the main event Dulce Gardenia defeated Kawato-San, forcing Kawato-San to be shaved bald afterwards per the Lucha de Apuestas stipulation for the match. On the undercard Príncipe Diamante defeated Espíritu Negro, after which Espíritu Negro was forced to unmask and reveal his real name, Juan Manuel González Olalde, in front of the Arena México crowd. In the semi-main event match La Alianza de Plata y Oro ("The Alliance of Silver and Gold"; Carístico and Místico) defeated La Nuev a Generación Dinamita ("The New Generation Dynamites"; Cuatrero and Forastero) to defend their CMLL World Tag Team Championship. The show included three additional matches.

== Production ==
=== Background ===
The Mexican wrestling company Consejo Mundial de Lucha Libre (Spanish for "World Wrestling Council"; CMLL) has held a number of major shows over the years using the moniker Sin Piedad ("No Pity" or "No Mercy"). CMLL has intermittently held a show billed specifically as Sin Piedad since 2000, primarily using the name for their "end of the year" show in December, although once they held a Sin Piedad show in August as well. CMLL has on occasion used a different name for the end-of-year show but Sin Piedad is the most commonly used name. All Sin Piedad shows have been held in Arena México in Mexico City, Mexico which is CMLL's main venue, its "home". The 2018 Sin Piedad was the third first show to be held on New Year's Day after being held on the same day in 2016 and 2017.

Starting in 2011 CMLL has been promoting a New Year's Day show with bigger, more prominent and promoted matches, although they did not specifically promote the shows under a special event name, they were simply a special version of their weekly Arena Mexico shows. Starting in 2011 CMLL added at least one high profile match to their shows, slowly building them into a special event. in 2011 the show featured the annual Reyes del Aire ("Kings of the Air") tournament, won by Ángel de Oro. In 2012 the January 1 show saw Hombre Bala Jr. and Super Halcón Jr. defeated the team known as Los Rayos Tapatío in a Luchas de Apuestas, masks vs masks match in what turned out to be Los Rayos last match in CMLL. The main event of the 2012 was the finals of a tournament for the vacant CMLL World Heavyweight Championship which was El Terrible defeat Rush 17th heavyweight champion. The 2013 start of the year show was highlighted first by then CMLL World Welterweight Champion Pólvora successfully defending against Titán and then the team of Boby Zavala and Disturbio defeated Leono and Tigre Blanco, forcing Leono and Blanco to have their hair shaved off as a result. The 2014 show, the last January 1 show without a specific title saw Super Halcón Jr. win that year's La Copa Junior tournament. The 2019 Sin Piedad show was the 14th show under the Sin Piedad label.

=== Storylines ===
The event featured six professional wrestling matches with different wrestlers involved in pre-existing scripted feuds, plots and storylines. Wrestlers were portrayed as either heels (referred to as rudos in Mexico, those that portray the "bad guys") or faces (técnicos in Mexico, the "good guy" characters) as they followed a series of tension-building events, which culminated in a wrestling match or series of matches.

== Matches ==
No.	Results	Stipulations
1	Black Panther, Drone, and Guerrero Maya Jr. defeated El Sagrado, Tiger, and Universo 2000 Jr. (two falls to one)	Best two-out-of-three falls six-man tag team match
2	El Felino, Hechicero, and Mephisto defeated Audaz, Rey Cometa, and Star Jr. (two falls to none)	Best two-out-of-three falls six-man tag team match
3	Bárbaro Cavernario, Hijo del Villano III, and Negro Casas defeated Atlantis Jr., Kráneo, and Soberano Jr. (two falls to one)	Best two-out-of-three falls six-man tag team match
4	Príncipe Diamante defeated Espíritu Negro (two falls to one)	Best two-out-of-three falls Lucha de Apuestas, Mask vs. Mask match
5	La Alianza de Plata y Oro (Carístico and Místico) (c) defeated La Nuev a Generación Dinamita (Cuatrero and Forastero) (two falls to one)	Best two-out-of-three falls tag team match for the CMLL World Tag Team Championship
6	Dulce Gardenia defeated Kawato-San (two falls to one)	Best two-out-of-three falls Lucha de Apuestas, Hair vs. Hair match
(c) / – the champion(s) heading into the match

== See also ==
- 2020 in professional wrestling
