= Shigeo Okumura =

Japanese professional wrestler (born 1972)

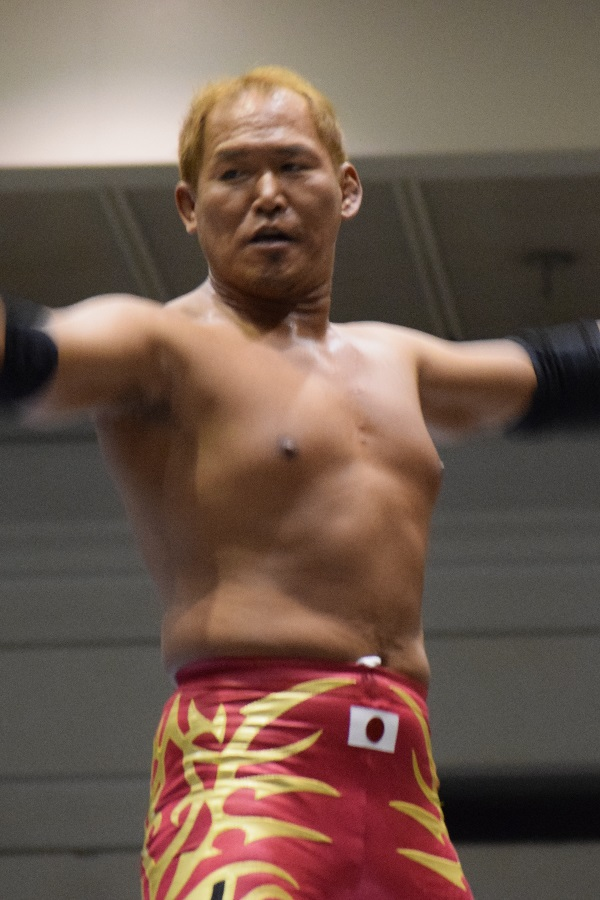
- Okumura in 2017

Personal information
- Born: May 25, 1972 (age 54) Ikeda, Osaka, Japan

Professional wrestling career
- Ring names: Okumura; Shigeo Okumura; Green Fire Okumura
- Billed height: 1.82 m (5 ft 11 1/2 in)
- Billed weight: 95 kg (209 lb)
- Trained by: El Satánico; Franco Columbo; Masanobu Kurisu
- Debut: December 31, 1994

Shigeo Okumura (奥村 茂雄, Okumura Shigeo; born May 25, 1972) is a Japanese professional wrestler. He is signed to Mexican professional wrestling promotion Consejo Mundial de Lucha Libre (CMLL). He also performs for Major League Wrestling (MLW), where he is a member of Contra Unit and a former two-time MLW World Tag Team Champion with Satoshi Kojima as CozyMAX.

Okumura originally worked in his native Japan for Tokyo Pro Wrestling (TPW), Frontier Martial-Arts Wrestling (FMW) and All Japan Pro Wrestling (AJPW) before moving to Mexico in 2004 to work for CMLL full-time. He was the leader of the stable La Ola Amarilla (Spanish for "The Yellow Wave"), often teaming with Japanese wrestlers who visited Mexico on excursion. Okumura is a former CMLL World Trios Champion, CMLL Arena Coliseo Tag Team Champion and Occidente Light Heavyweight Champion. Through CMLL's partnerships, he has also wrestled for New Japan Pro-Wrestling (NJPW) and Ring of Honor (ROH) in the United States.

== Early life ==
Shigeo Okumura was born on May 25, 1972, in Ikeda, Osaka, Japan. Prior to becoming a professional wrestler, Okumura practiced playing baseball as a pitcher before quitting at the age of eight due to an elbow injury.

== Professional wrestling career ==
=== Early career (1994–2000) ===
Shigeo Okumura made his professional wrestling debut on December 31, 1994, after training under Masanobu Kurisu for three and a half years. He worked for the Japanese promotion Tokyo Pro Wrestling (TPW) until its closure in 1996, thus becoming a freelance wrestler, working for a variety of companies on the Japanese independent circuit and making one-shot appearances for New Japan Pro-Wrestling (NJPW) and All Japan Pro Wrestling (AJPW). At some point between 1996 and 1999, Okumura won the CCW Heavyweight Championship and the CAWF Tag Team Championship, teaming with Nobutaka Araya. In late 1999, Okumura began working for Frontier Martial Arts Wrestling (FMW), teaming with Atsushi Onita and Mitsunobu Kikuzawa in a tournament to crown the inaugural holders of the Barbed-Wire Street Fight Six-Man Tag Team Championship. The team made it to the finals, but were defeated by Ichiro Yaguchi, Mr. Pogo and Shoji Nakamaki on December 26. On January 28, 2000, Onita, Okumura and Kikuzawa won the now-vacant title by defeating Nakamaki, the Great Kendo and Yaguchi, but lost it in a rematch four days later.

=== All Japan Pro Wrestling (2000–2004) ===
When Mitsuharu Misawa left AJPW to form Pro Wrestling NOAH, along with a large group of AJPW wrestlers, Shigeo Okumura was given a full-time contract with AJPW to fill the void left by the exodus. On September 8, 2001, Okumura and Nobutaka Araya lost to Arashi and Koki Kitahara in a match for the vacant All Asia Tag Team Championship. In January 2002, Okumura participated in block A of the "Giant Baba Cup", accumulating fourteen points before losing to Mitsuya Nagai in the block final. After Arashi and Kitahara vacated the title, Okumura and Nagai fought Arashi and Araya on April 13 to determine the new champions, but lost. Okumura remained with AJPW until his resignation in March 2004.

=== Consejo Mundial de Lucha Libre (2004–present) ===
==== Early years (2004–2009) ====
On May 14, 2004, Okumura traveled to Mexico on a learning trip to improve his in-ring skills by being exposed to other wrestling styles than the Japanese style. At the recommendation of his trainer, Kurisu, Okumura began working for Consejo Mundial de Lucha Libre (CMLL) as a rudo (heel or "bad guy") "Anti-Mexico" character, which stood in contrast to Okumura's personal views, as he liked living and working in Mexico so much that he has remained there since 2004. On December 5, Okumura participated in a four-man steel cage match under Lucha de Apuestas ("bet match") rules, where the last man in the cage would have his hair shaved off. The match, which came down to Okumura and Negro Casas, saw Casas escape, leaving Okumura to be shaved bald, per lucha libre traditions.

In mid-2005, Okumura began teaming with Hiroshi Tanahashi and Shinsuke Nakamura, both of whom NJPW sent to Mexico to gain international experience, much like Okumura the year before. At the CMLL 72nd Anniversary Show on September 16, the trio lost to the all-Mexican team of Averno, Rey Bucanero and Último Guerrero. On May 12, 2006, Okumura participated in CMLL's International Gran Prix, teaming with other foreign wrestlers to take on a team of eight Mexican wrestlers. Okumura was the twelfth wrestler eliminated, being pinned by eventual winner Guerrero. On June 18, Okumura was part of another multi-man steel cage match under Lucha de Apuestas rules, putting his hair on the line against Bucanero, Casas, El Terrible, Heavy Metal, Máximo, Tarzan Boy and Universo 2000. In the end, Bucanero pinned Okumura, forcing him to be shaved bald once more. On May 11, 2007, Okumura was the second wrestler eliminated by Bucanero in that year's International Gran Prix.

==== La Ola Amarilla (2009–2017) ====
In mid-2009, Okumura, alongside No Limit (Naito and Yujiro), who joined CMLL during their foreign excursion, formed an "Anti-Mexico" faction called La Ola Amarilla ("The Yellow Wave"). The team was given a strong push and booked to win a series of high-profile matches against various Mexican tecnicos (faces or "good guys"). On July 31, all three members were involved in a fifteen-man steel cage Lucha de Apuestas in the main event of Infierno en el Ring ("Inferno in the Ring"). Okumura was the fourth to escape the cage, watching as Naito defeated Toscano to win the match. Shortly before the CMLL 76th Anniversary Show, the group were joined by Jushin Thunder Liger, who was touring Mexico. At the event on September 18, Okumura, Liger, Naito and Yujiro defeated Atlantis, Black Warrior, Guerrero and Héctor Garza in the semi-main event. The following week, Yujiro was scheduled to team with Semental in the Torneo Gran Alternativa ("Great Alternative Tournament"), where a veteran teams with a rookie. Before the match, in a scripted moment, Okumura and Yujiro attacked Semental. Yujiro opted to only team with another Japanese wrestler, leading to Okumura taking Semental's place. They defeated the teams of Rouge and Toscano and Garza and Ángel de Plata en route to the finals, where Okumura and Yujiro defeated Ángel de Oro and Místico to win the tournament. Okumura subsequently feuded with Máximo and won his first Lucha de Apuestas on November 15, defeating Máximo to leave him bald in the process.

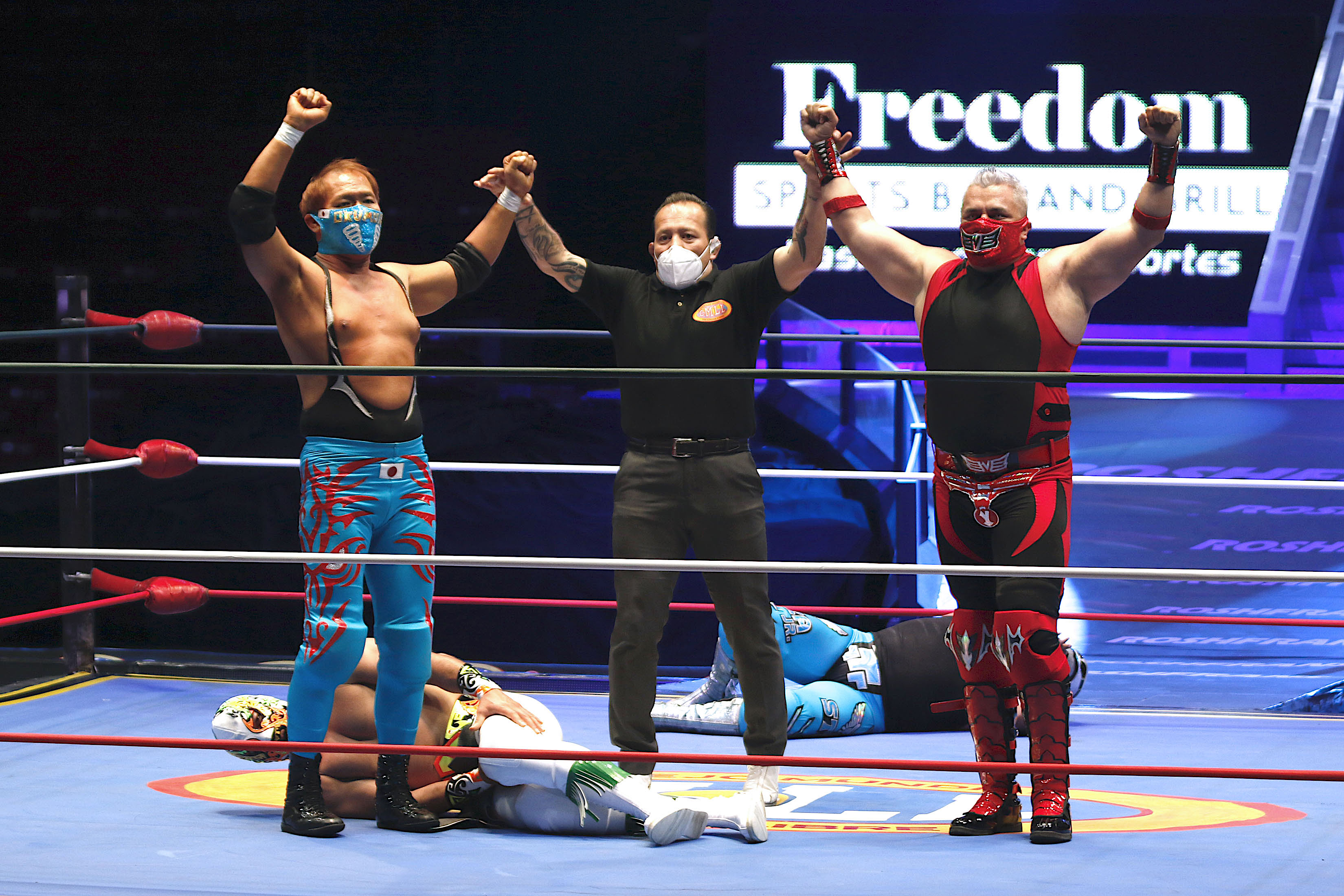
Okumura (left) in July 2020, celebrating a fall with Vangelis

While Yujiro and Naito left Mexico for NJPW by the end of 2009, Naito eventually returned and announced that he would work for CMLL on a regular basis and be joined by NJPW rookie Taichi, keeping La Ola Amarilla alive in CMLL. At Homenaje a Dos Leyendas ("Homage to Two Legends") on March 19, 2010, Okumura, Taichi and Ray Mendoza Jr. lost to Blue Panther, Brazo de Plata and La Máscara by disqualification. On May 7, Okumura, Taichi and Hiroshi Tanahashi defeated El Hijo del Fantasma, Garza and La Máscara to win the CMLL World Trios Championship, but lost it to La Máscara, La Sombra and Máscara Dorada two weeks later on May 21. On March 18, 2011, he, Euforia and Raziel lost to Diamante, Metro and Stuka Jr. at that year's Homenaje a Dos Leyendas. Okumura and Yoshihashi were defeated by Metro and Stuka Jr. in the opening match of Juicio Final ("Final Judgment") on June 17. On July 12, Okumura defeated El Gallo for CMLL's Guadalajara branch's Occidente Light Heavyweight Championship.

In February 2012, Okumura began an alliance with Kyosuke Mikami, who came to Mexico from NJPW for an extended learning tour and was given the ring name Namajague, as well as a mask. Their team name was labeled La Fiebre Amarilla ("The Yellow Fever") and not simply "La Ola Amarilla". On July 12, Okumura lost the Occidente Light Heavyweight Championship to El Sagrado. On September 9, La Fiebre Amarilla unsuccessfully challenged Fuego and Stuka Jr. for the CMLL Arena Coliseo Tag Team Championship. In the months following their first match, La Fiebre Amarilla developed a long-running storyline with Stuka Jr. and Rey Cometa; during a press conference on February 21, 2013, it was announced that the two teams would face off at Homenaje a Dos Leyendas under Lucha de Apuestas rules, where Namajague and Stuka Jr. risked their masks and Okumura and Cometa risked their hair. Before the event, Fuego and Stuka Jr. accepted La Fiebre Amarilla's challenge for a title rematch. On March 3, Okumura and Namajague defeated Fuego and Stuka Jr. to win the CMLL Arena Coliseo Tag Team Championship. However, in the main event of Homenaje a Dos Leyendas on March 15, they were defeated by Stuka Jr. and Cometa, forcing Okumura to have all his hair shaved off and Namajague to unmask and reveal his real name.

For holding a championship, Okumura participated in the Universal Championship tournament, but lost to Tanahashi in the first round on August 30. He, Namajague and Ishii defeated Cometa, Fuego and Stuka Jr. on September 13 at the CMLL 80th Anniversary Show. On November 3, Okumura and Namajague lost the Arena Coliseo Tag Team Championship to Los Reyes de la Atlantida ("The Kings of Atlantis"; Delta and Guerrero Maya Jr.). In January 2014, NJPW trainee Hiromu Takahashi, who became Kamaitachi, joined Okumura in La Fiebre Amarilla. On July 13, they unsuccessfully challenged Los Reyes de la Atlantida for the title. They were subsequently joined by Fujin and Raijin in February 2016. At Homenaje a Dos Leyendas on March 18, Okumura, Kamaitachi, Fujin and Raijin lost to Dragon Lee, Máscara Dorada, Místico and Valiente. On February 22, 2017, Okumura fractured his C6 and C7 vertebrae while training at Arena México. The injury was so severe that three specialists told him he should never wrestle again, warning him that there was a high risk of ending up in a wheelchair if he continued to do so. However, a Japanese specialist told him surgery was possible, although the recovery could take up to two years; he underwent surgery in Japan on April 18. He returned to the ring on November 24, teaming with El Terrible and Hechicero to defeat Cometa, Soberano Jr. and Titán.

==== Various stables (2017–present) ====
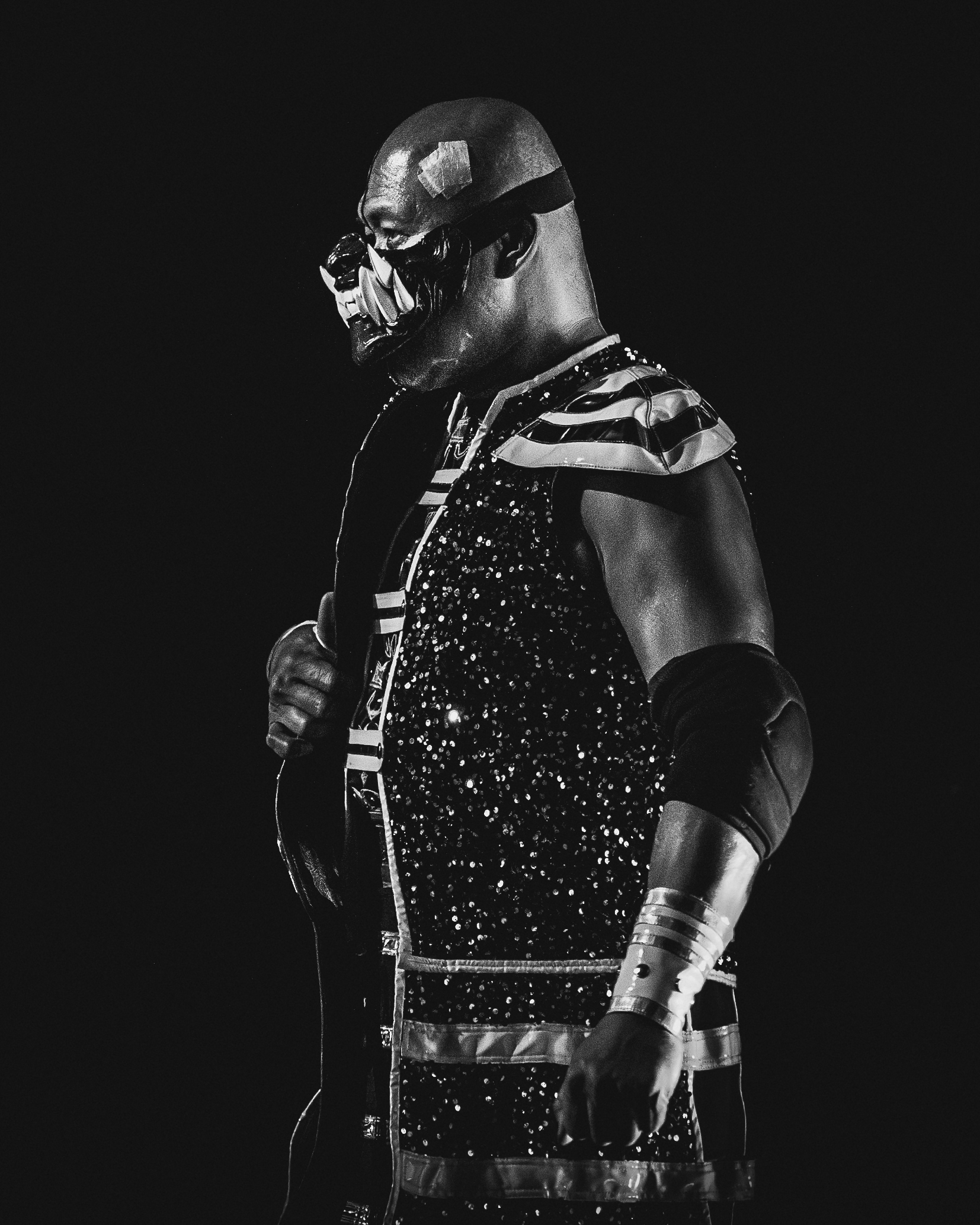
Okumura in April 2025

Okumura began teaming with Johnny Idol and Sam Adonis in December, forming the foreigner stable Eje del Mal ("Axis of Evil"). On March 9, 2018, he and Adonis lost to El Terrible and Rey Bucanero in the first round of a tournament for the CMLL World Tag Team Championship. Not long after, the stable was joined by Kawato San. Their last match together saw Okumura, Kawato San and Virus defeat Diamond, Drone and Fuego on January 31, 2020. The following month, Okumura was forced to team with Dulce Gardenia as part of the Torneo Nacional de Parejas Increíbles ("National Incredible Pairs Tournament"), but lost to Felino and Niebla Roja in the first round.

At Sin Salida ("No Escape") on January 1, 2022, Okumura put his hair on the line in an eleven-man steel cage match, where he escaped the cage at the same time as Audaz, keeping his hair safe in the process. The following year, he began teaming regularly with El Coyote and Pólvora as Los Chacales ("The Jackals"). They remained a team until February 3, 2025, when they defeated Arkalis, El Tapatio and Pegasso. Shortly after, Okumura began teaming with Yutani as Los Demonios Samurais ("The Samurai Demons"). In 2026, Okumura began teaming with Shoma Kato, a NJPW young lion on excursion in CMLL.

=== New Japan Pro-Wrestling (2009–present) ===
After a few one-off appearances, Okumura returned to NJPW on February 15, 2009, teaming with Koji Kanemoto on the pre-show to defeat Kazuchika Okada and Nobuo Yoshihashi. He, Místico and Misterioso Jr. were scheduled to tour with NJPW in early May, which was canceled due to the outbreak of the swine flu pandemic. Despite this, he made two further appearances on August 13 and 15.

On January 22 and 23, 2011, Okumura returned to Japan to participate in the inaugural two-night Fantastica Mania 2011 tour, co-promoted by NJPW and CMLL. On the first night, he and Atlantis unsuccessfully challenged Bad Intentions (Giant Bernard and Karl Anderson) for the IWGP Tag Team Championship. The next night, he and No Limit unsuccessfully challenged La Máscara, La Sombra and Máscara Dorada for the CMLL World Trios Championship. He was subsequently invited back for the Fantastica Mania 2012, Fantastica Mania 2013 and Fantastica Mania 2014 tours. In January 2015, during the Fantastica Mania 2015 tour, he unsuccessfully challenged Ángel de Oro for the CMLL World Light Heavyweight Championship. The following year, he and Bobby Z unsuccessfully challenged Guerrero Maya Jr. and Panther for the CMLL Arena Coliseo Tag Team Championship on the Fantastica Mania 2016 tour. Okumura also failed to win the NWA World Historic Light Heavyweight Championship from Stuka Jr. during the Fantastica Mania 2020 tour in January 2020.

Okumura returned to NJPW in February 2023 to participate in the revived Fantastica Mania 2023 tour. During the Fantastica Mania 2025 tour in February 2025, CozyMAX (Okumura and Satoshi Kojima) lost to Los Depredadores ("The Predators"; Magnus and Rugido) in the first round of an interfaction tag team tournament, but defeated La Fuerza Poblana ("The Puebla Force"; Stigma and Xelhua) in the third place match. Near the end of the tour, they defeated Los Depredadores to retain the MLW World Tag Team Championship. They participated in a tag team tournament during the following year's Fantastica Mania 2026 tour, but lost to Atlantis and Atlantis Jr. in the first round.

=== Ring of Honor (2016, 2019, 2025) ===
On October 29, 2016, through CMLL's working relationship with the US-based Ring of Honor (ROH), Okumura made his ROH debut in Baltimore, teaming with Hechicero and Último Guerrero in a tournament to determine the inaugural ROH World Six-Man Tag Team Champions. They defeated The Addiction (Christopher Daniels and Frankie Kazarian) and Kamaitachi in the first round, but lost to The Kingdom (Matt Taven, T. K. O'Ryan and Vinny Marseglia) in the semi-finals. Okumura returned to ROH on Saturday Night At Center Stage on August 24, 2019, teaming with Felino and Silas Young to defeat the Shinobi Shadow Squad (Cheeseburger, Eli Isom and Ryan Nova). The next night, he and Felino lost to The Bouncers (Brawler Milonas and Beer City Bruiser) in a three-way tag team match also involving Coast 2 Coast (LSG and Shaheem Ali). In September, he participated in all three nights of the Global Wars Espectacular tour.

Okumura returned to ROH at a Ring of Honor Wrestling taping on March 15, 2025 (aired March 27), losing to Dark Panther. He then defeated Stigma on the August 28 episode.

=== Major League Wrestling (2024–present) ===
On January 11, 2024, Major League Wrestling (MLW) announced the debut of Okumura, who was placed in a tag team with Satoshi Kojima and served as his cornerman at SuperFight. Their first match saw them defeat Davey Boy Smith Jr. and Richard Holliday during a taping of The Burning Crush on February 3 (aired February 17). Three days later, their team name was revealed to be CozyMAX. At War Chamber on March 29, they teamed with 1 Called Manders and Matthew Justice as Team MLW, defeating World Titan Federation (Smith, Holliday, Josh Bishop and Tom Lawlor) in the titular match. At Azteca Lucha on May 11, CozyMAX defeated Justice and Manders to win the vacant MLW World Tag Team Championship. Okumura competed in the Opera Cup tournament, but lost to Atlantis Jr. in the first round on July 12 at Blood & Thunder. CozyMAX lost the title to Contra Unit (Ikuro Kwon and Minoru Suzuki) at Summer of the Beasts on August 29. After defeating Kwon in a singles match on November 23 at Slaughterhouse, he and Kojima regained the title at One Shot on December 5. At Battle Riot VII on April 5, 2025, Okumura competed in the 40-man Battle Riot for the MLW World Heavyweight Championship, but was eliminated by Mr. Thomas. On May 2, CozyMAX lost the title to Los Depredadores.

On the June 6, 2026 episode of Fusion, Okumura joined Contra Unit, assisting member Kushida in a backstage attack on Alan Angels.

== Personal life ==
Okumura is a Catholic Christian. He is also married.

== Championships and accomplishments ==
- Can-Am Wrestling Federation
  - CAWF Tag Team Championship (1 time) – with Nobutaka Araya
- Consejo Mundial de Lucha Libre
  - CMLL Arena Coliseo Tag Team Championship (1 time) – with Namajague
  - CMLL World Trios Championship (1 time) – with Hiroshi Tanahashi and Taichi
  - Occidente Light Heavyweight Championship (1 time)
  - Gran Alternativa (2009) – with Yujiro
- Costa Rica Wrestling Embassy
  - CWE World Championship (1 time)
- Major League Wrestling
  - MLW World Tag Team Championship (2 times) – with Satoshi Kojima
- Onita Pro
  - Barbed-Wire Streetfight Six-Tag Team Championship (1 time) – with Atsushi Onita and Mitsunobu Kikuzawa
- Tokyo Pro Wrestling
  - CCW Heavyweight Championship (1 time)

== Luchas de Apuestas record ==
Winner (wager)	Loser (wager)	Location	Event	Date	Notes
Negro Casas (hair)	Okumura (hair)	Mexico City	CMLL Domingos De Coliseo	December 5, 2004	(Note: This was a steel cage match that also included Rey Bucanero and Tarzan Boy.)
Rey Bucanero (hair)	Okumura (hair)	Mexico City	CMLL Domingos De Coliseo	June 18, 2006	(Note: This was a steel cage match. Other participants in the cage match were: Universo 2000, Negro Casas, Tarzan Boy, Máximo, Heavy Metal and El Terrible.)
Okumura (hair)	Máximo (hair)	Mexico City	CMLL Domingos Arena Mexico	November 15, 2009	
Stuka Jr. (mask) and Rey Cometa (hair)	La Fiebre Amarilla (Okumura (hair) and Namajague (mask))	Mexico City	Homenaje a Dos Leyendas	March 15, 2013	
