= Espíritu Negro =

Mexican professional wrestler

Personal information
- Born: Juan Manuel González Olade; July 7, 1981 (age 45) Santiago de Querétaro, Querétaro, Mexico
- Relatives: Rey Cometa (brother); Espíritu Negro Jr. (son)

Professional wrestling career
- Ring name: Espíritu Negro
- Billed height: 1.72 m (5 ft 8 in)
- Billed weight: 87 kg (192 lb)
- Trained by: Atomico de Oro; Drágon de Oriente I; Drágon de Oriente II; Dr. Kaoma Jr.; Franco Columbo
- Debut: 2000

Juan Manuel González Olade (born July 7, 1981), better known by his ring name Espíritu Negro (Spanish for "Black Spirit"), is a Mexican professional wrestler, working for Mexican promotion Consejo Mundial de Lucha Libre (CMLL). He portrays a tecnico wrestling character.

He is the brother of Mario Alberto González, who also works for CMLL under the ring name Rey Cometa. His son is also a wrestler, working under the name Espíritu Negro Jr. He was previously a member of the rudo stable La Ola Negra ("The Black Wave"), but now wrestles with his brother as Los Atrapa Sueños ("Dream Catchers"), where they are former one-time Mexican National Tag Team Champions and one-time Mexican National Trios Champions (alongside Dulce Gardenia).

== Professional wrestling career ==
González made his in ring debut in 2000, after training under Atomico de Oro, Drágon de Oriente I and Dr. Kaoma Jr. in his native Santiago de Querétaro, Querétaro, Mexico. His first documented match, using the ring name Espíritu Negro, took place on August 18, 2000 as he and his trainer Kaoma Jr. took on González's brother Rey Cometa and Constelación. He would later work the occasional undercard match for Lucha Libre AAA Worldwide (AAA) when they held shows in Querétaro. On September 14, 2012, Espíritu Negro appeared as the corner man for his brother as Rey Cometa risked his mask in a Lucha de Apuestas ("Bet match") at the CMLL 79th Anniversary Show.

=== Consejo Mundial de Lucha Libre (2014–present) ===
In 2014, Espíritu Negro began working for Consejo Mundial de Lucha Libre (CMLL) as a lower card rudo (the antagonist or heel characters in professional wrestling). In his debut match, Espíritu Negro teamed up with Canelo Casas and Fuerza Chicana to defeat Camaleón, Flyer and Tigre Rojo Jr. For the 2014 Torneo Gran Alternativa ("Great Alternative tournament"), Espíritu Negro teamed up with veteran wrestler Reapper for a tag team tournament where relative rookies are teamed up with veterans. The team was eliminated by Herodes Jr. and Shocker in the opening round. A month later, Espíritu Negro was one of 16 wrestlers trying to qualify for the 2014 En Busca de un Ídolo ("In search of an idol") tournament, but did not make it past the torneo cibernetico elimination match.

==== La Ola Negra (2019–2020) ====
On April 10, 2019 Espíritu Negro teamed up with veteran Mr. Niebla for his second Torneo Gran Alternativa tournament appearance, representing the rookies five years after his previous Gran Alternativa appearance. The two lost to Dulce Gardenia and Volador Jr. in the opening round.

In late 2019, Espiritu Negro became involved in a long running storyline feud with Príncipe Diamante, one that often saw Espiritu Negro tear Diamante's mask apart or completely off during matches. Espiritu Negro and his La Ola Negra ("The Black Wave") teammates (Akuma and Espanto Jr.) cheated to defeat Diamante. On the November 26 show in Arena Mexico, the two wrestled to a double disqualification as they tore the masks off each other during the match. Oftentimes the matches would be followed by a mask match, or Lucha de Apuestas ("Bet match") challenge. On December 10, CMLL announced that they had signed a Lucha de Apuestas match between Príncipe Diamante and Espiritu Negro for the January 1, 2020 Sin Piedad show. Espiritu Negro, seconded by his brother Rey Cometa, lost the match to Diamante. As a result, he was forced to unmask and reveal his real name, Juan Manuel González Olade.

==== Los Atrapa Sueños (2020–present) ====
In early 2020, the González brothers began talking about working as a team, despite Rey Cometa being a tecnico and Espíritu Negro working as a rudo. The brothers did team together for one match, as part of the 2020 Torneo Nacional de Parejas Increíbles ("National Incredible Pairs tournament"), losing in the first round to Ángel de Oro and Sansón. This was the only time the brothers teamed up prior to CMLL shutting down due to the COVID-19 pandemic in March 2020. When CMLL returned they announced that the fans would be voting on who would challenge for the CMLL World Tag Team Championship at their CMLL 87th Anniversary Show. One of the options presented to the fans was Rey Cometa and Espíritu Negro, collectively called Los Atrapa Sueños ("The Dream Catchers"). In the end the González brothers won the fan poll with almost 11,000 more votes than the runner up. Due to the overall votes the match was positioned as the main event as it garnered more votes than the other six polls. Los Atrapa Sueños' first match together took place on the September 4 Super Viernes show, where they defeated Audaz and Guerrero Maya Jr. This was followed by a victory over Los Cancerberos del Infierno (Cancerbero and Raziel) the following week, and finally Hechicero and Mephisto the week prior to the anniversary show. At the CMLL 87th Anniversary Show, they lost to La Alianza de Plata y Oro (Carístico and Místico).

On July 9, 2021, Los Atrapa Sueños defeated the pairing of Atlantis Jr. and Flyer to win the Mexican National Tag Team Championship. On October 4, they were defeated by the pairing of Felino Jr. and Pólvora, ending their reign at 87 days. Dulce Gardenia would later join Los Atrapa Sueños, and on May 28, 2022, the trio won a four-way match for the vacant Mexican National Trios Championship.

== Championships and accomplishments ==
- Consejo Mundial de Lucha Libre
  - Mexican National Tag Team Championship (1 time) – with Rey Cometa
  - Mexican National Trios Championship (1 time) – with Dulce Gardenia and Rey Cometa

== Luchas de Apuestas record ==
Winner (wager)	Loser (wager)	Location	Event	Date	Notes
Príncipe Diamante (mask)	Espíritu Negro (mask)	Mexico City	Sin Piedad	January 1, 2020	
Akuma & Dark Magic (hair)	Espíritu Negro & Rey Cometa (hair)	Mexico City	CMLL Atlantis 40th Anniversary Show	July 14, 2023	
