= Mainero, Tamaulipas =

Coordinates: 25°52′N 98°03′W

Mainero
- Municipality
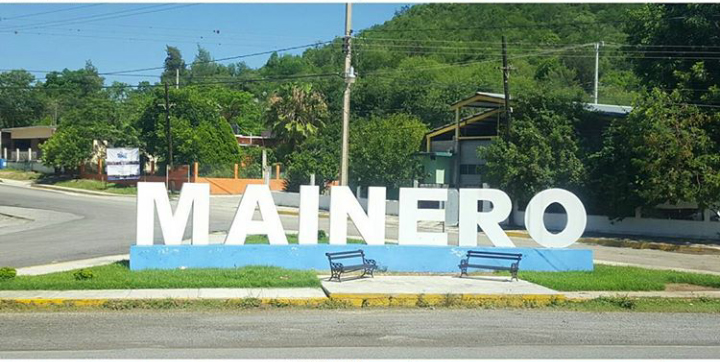

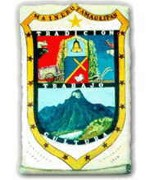
- Coat of arms

- Location in Mexico Mainero (Mexico)
- Country: Mexico
- State: Tamaulipas
- Demonym: (in Spanish)
- Time zone: UTC−6 (CST)

Location in Tamaulipas.

Mainero is a municipality located in the Mexican state of Tamaulipas. Its capital is called Villa Mainero and had 338 inhabitants in the 2020 INEGI census. The municipality as a whole had 2 048 inhabitants. Other localities include José Guadalupe Mainero, Guadalupe Mainero and Guadalupe Mainero. All named after Guadalupe Mainero (1856–1901), a Mexican journalist, teacher and governor of Tamaulipas between May 4, 1896 and July 31, 1901.

== Famous people ==
- El Coyote, professional wrestler (1997–)
