= Mexican National Tag Team Championship =

Professional wrestling championship

- Close up of the front plate of one of the championship belts

Details
- Promotion: Empresa Mexicana de Lucha Libre (1957–1991); Consejo Mundial de Lucha Libre (1991–1992, 2020–present); AAA (1992–2007); Independent circuit (2009, 2011)
- Date established: June 14, 1957 (retroactive) (Note: At least one publication at the time stated that the belts Los Hermanos Shadow won were actually the CMLL Arena Coliseo Tag Team Championship.); June 18, 1982 (actual)
- Current champions: Las Fieras del Ring (Rugido and Black Tiger (IX))
- Date won: July 9, 2023
Statistics
- First champions: actual: Los Hermano Mendoza (Cachorro Mendoza and Ringo Mendoza) retroactive: Los Hermanos Shadow (Blue Demon and Black Shadow)
- Most reigns: Team: Los Destructores (Tony Arce and Volcano; 3); Individual: Tony Arce (4)
- Longest reign: Octagón and La Parka (3,110 days) (Note: Statistics for longest and shortest reigns only count reigns where both the date the championship was won and lost are known.)
- Shortest reign: Los Metálicos (6 days) (Oro and Plata)

The Mexican National Tag Team Championship (Campeonato Nacional de Parejas) is a national Mexican professional wrestling championship controlled by the Comisión de Box y Lucha Libre Mexico D.F. (Mexico City Boxing and Wrestling Commission) and competed for by two-man tag teams. The championship was created in 1982 (retroactively in 1957), promoted regularly until 2003, and intermittently until 2011 when the last known defense took place. Empresa Mexicana de Lucha Libre (EMLL) had control of the championship from its creation until 1992, (Note: EMLL was renamed Consejo Mundial de Lucha Libre; CMLL in late 1991) at which point it was transferred to AAA. (Note: In this, "control" refers to the everyday use of the title, determining which storylines the title is being used it, who gets to challenge for the title, how to use it in a public relations sense.)

Magazines from around the time of Cachorro & Ringo Mendoza's tournament win on June 18, 1982 claim that they were the first national tag team champions. Although other mentions of prior "national" tag champions exist in records, they consistently line up with records for other titles known to exist at the time, such as the EMLL Arena México Tag Team Championship. Regardless, those prior histories have since been folded into the national championship's own and are generally accepted as part of the currently-recognized lineage. Thus, the "first" champions are apocryphally considered Los Hermanos Shadow (The Shadow Brothers; Blue Demon and Black Shadow), who won an eight-team tournament in 1957. The championship was reintroduced in 2020 after previously being abandoned in 2011.

In the mid-1990s there was confusion about who was recognized as champions for a period of time. In December 1995, one half of then-championship team Los Guerreras, Fuerza Guerrera, left AAA, which led to the promotion declaring the title vacant. On January 12, 1996, new champions were crowned as Juventud Guerrera and Psicosis defeated Volador and El Mexicano to claim the titles. When Juventud also left AAA, the Comisión de Box y Lucha Libre decided that Los Guerreras were never officially stripped of the championship, refusing to recognize Juventud Guerrera and Psicosis as champions. In August 1996, the commission finally declared the championship vacant and returned the championship belts to AAA for future use.

The last championship team under AAA's control was Octagón and La Parka, (Note: Was referred to as La Parka Jr. at the time of their championship victory, but changed his name to simply "La Parka" in mid-2003) who won the championship on June 20, 2003, when they defeated Electroshock and Chessman. In early 2009, AAA stopped promoting all Mexican National Championships, opting to focus on their AAA branded championships. Octagón and La Parka were never stripped of the championship, but did not defend them on any AAA shows after late 2007. From that point on the championship was only defended twice on the Mexican independent circuit, in March 2009, and then in December 2011. (Note: Last known championship defense) The championship was inactive after the last known defense. until February 19, 2020, when Consejo Mundial de Lucha Libre (CMLL; formerly EMLL) announced that they were bringing the championship back.

Las Fieras del Ring (Rugido and Black Tiger (IX)) are the current champions in the first reign. They won the titles by defeating La Fuerza Tapatia (Esfinge and Fugaz) on Domingo Familiar in Mexico City, Mexico, on July 9, 2023; they are the 45th overall champions. Los Destructores (Tony Arce and Vulcano) held the championship three times, the most of all recognized champions, while Tony Arce holds the individual record with four reigns. Los Metálicos (Oro and Plata) had the shortest verified reign, six days in December 1991. Octagón and La Parka's reign lasted 3,110 days, the longest known reign of any champions.

== Tournaments ==
=== 1997 ===
In 1997, the then-reigning champions Fuerza Guerrera and Juventud Guerrera began working for different promotions, causing the championship to be vacated by AAA. They held a one-night eight-team tournament on July 20, 1997, at the El Toreo de Naucalpan bullfighting arena in Naucalpan, Mexico State. Some sources mistakenly list the AAA "Young Stars Tag Team" tournament held on May 15, 1997, and broadcast on June 7, as the championship tournament, which was won by the same team, but was not for the vacant championship.

First round
Dos Caras and Heavy Metal
Fuerza Guerrera and Mosco de la Merced	W
El Canek and El Hijo del Fantasma	W
Cibernético and Shu el Guerrero
El Cobarde Jr. and Gran Markus Jr.	W
Mil Máscaras and Kato Kung Lee
Perro Aguayo and Perro Aguayo Jr.	W
El Signo and Sangre Chicana

Semifinals
Fuerza Guerrera and Mosco de la Merced	W
El Canek and El Hijo del Fantasma
El Cobarde Jr. and Gran Markus Jr.
Perro Aguayo and Perro Aguayo Jr.	W

Final
Fuerza Guerrera and Mosco de la Merced	W
Perro Aguayo and Perro Aguayo Jr.

=== 2020 ===
In 1992, then reigning Mexican National Tag Team Champions Los Destructores, left CMLL and doing so taking the championship with them to AAA. The championship was defended in AAA from 1992 until 2007, and subsequently only defended twice more on the independent circuit before becoming dormant. La Parka, one half of the last recognized championship team, died on January 11, 2020. A couple of weeks later CMLL officially announced that they had regained control of the Mexican National Tag Team Championship and would be holding a tournament for the championship in February and March. The tournament ran from February 28 to March 13, and saw Atlantis Jr. and Flyer defeated El Hijo de Villano III and Templario to win the championship.

Tournament brackets

Round of 16
Disturbio and Virus	W
Pegasso and Stigma
El Hijo del Villano III and Templario	W
Dulce Gardenia and Fuego
Black Panther and Blue Panther Jr.
Ephesto and Luciferno	W
Misterioso and El Sagrado
Soberano Jr. and Titán	W
Rey Cometa and Star Jr.	W
Pólvora and Vangellys
Atlantis Jr. and Flyer	W
Cancerbero and Raziel
Audaz and Fugaz
El Felino and Tiger	W
Rey Bucanero and Shocker	W
Esfinge and Drone

Quarterfinals
Disturbio and Virus
El Hijo del Villano III and Templario	W
Ephesto and Luciferno
Soberano Jr. and Titán	W
Atlantis Jr. and Flyer	W
Rey Cometa and Star Jr.
Rey Bucanero and Shocker
El Felino and Tiger	W

Semifinals
El Hijo del Villano III and Templario	W
Soberano Jr. and Titán
Atlantis Jr. and Flyer	W
El Felino and Tiger

Finals
El Hijo del Villano III and Templario
Atlantis Jr. and Flyer	W

== Title history ==
Key
No.	Overall reign number
Reign	Reign number for the specific team—reign numbers for the individuals are in parentheses, if different
Days	Number of days held
N/A	Unknown information
(NET)	Championship change took place "no earlier than" the date listed
†	Championship change is unrecognized by the promotion

No.	Champion	Championship change			Reign statistics		Notes	Ref.
No.	Champion	Date	Event	Location	Reign	Days	Notes	Ref.
Empresa Mexicana de Lucha Libre (EMLL)
†	Los Hermanos Shadow (Black Shadow and Blue Demon)	June 14, 1957	Live event	Mexico City	1	(Note: The length of the championship reign is too uncertain to calculate.)	Defeated Tarzán López and Enrique Llanes in an eight-team tournament final	
Championship history is unrecorded from June 14, 1957 to 1958.
†	Espectro I and Ray Mendoza	1958	Live event	—	1		Uncertain whom Espectro and Mendoza defeated to win the championship	
Championship history is unrecorded from 1958 to 1959.
†	Tarzán López and Henry Pilusso	1959	Live event	—	1			
Championship history is unrecorded from 1959 to 1962.
†	Los Rebeldes (Rene Guajardo and Karloff Lagarde)	1962	Live event	—	1			
Championship history is unrecorded from 1962 to October 16, 1964.
†	Los Espantos (Espanto I and Espanto II)	1960s	EMLL event	Mexico City	1		Unclear whom Los Espantos won the championship from	
†	Rayo de Jalisco and El Santo	October 16, 1964	Live event	—	1			
Championship history is unrecorded from October 16, 1964 to April 22, 1966.
†	Rayo de Jalisco and El Santo	April 22, 1966	Live event	—	2		Defeated Rene Guajardo and Karloff Lagarde in the final of a tournament	
Championship history is unrecorded from April 22, 1966 to 1967.
†	La Ola Blanca (Ángel Blanco and Dr. Wagner)	1967	Live event	—	1			
Championship history is unrecorded from 1967 to 1972.
†	Los Villanos (Villano I and Villano II)	1972	EMLL event	—	1		Uncertain whom Los Villanos defeated to win the championship	(Note: La Magia del Ring magazine noted that Victoria and O'Borman defeated Los Villanos in 1972, but provided no details on whom Los Villanos defeated)
†	Bruno Victoria and Dr. O'Borman	1972	EMLL show	—	1			
Championship history is unrecorded from 1972 to 1980.
†	Halcón 78 and Falcón	1980	EMLL show	—	1			
Championship history is unrecorded from 1980/1981 to 1981.
†	Los Brazos (Brazo de Oro and Brazo de Plata)	1981	EMLL show	—	1			
Championship history is unrecorded from 1981 to June 18, 1982.
13	Cachorro Mendoza and Ringo Mendoza	June 18, 1982	EMLL show	Mexico City	1	1,029	Defeated Los Infernales (El Satánico and Espectro Jr.) in the final of a tournament	
14	Cien Caras and Sangre Chicana	April 12, 1985	Super Viernes	Mexico City	1	199		
15	Tony Benetto and Rayo de Jalisco Jr.	October 28, 1985	EMLL show	Nuevo Laredo, Tamaulipas	1	170		
16	Los Hermanos Dinamita (Cien Caras (2) and Máscara Año 2000)	April 16, 1986	EMLL show	Cuernavaca, Morelos	1	344		
17	Los Infernales (Masakre and MS-1)	March 26, 1987	EMLL show	Cuernavaca, Morelos	1	344		
18	Ángel Azteca and Atlantis	March 4, 1988	EMLL show	Mexico City	1	813		
19	Bestia Salvaje and Pierroth Jr.	May 26, 1990	EMLL Sabados Arena Puebla	Puebla, Puebla	1	287		
Consejo Mundial de Lucha Libre (CMLL)
20	Ángel Azteca and Volador	March 9, 1991	EMLL Sabados Arena Puebla	Puebla, Puebla	1	81		
21	Los Destructores (Tony Arce and Volcano)	May 29, 1991	EMLL show	Acapulco, Guerrero	1	189		
22	Los Metálicos (Oro and Plata)	December 4, 1991	CMLL show	Acapulco, Guerrero	1	6		
—	Vacated	December 10, 1991	—	—	—	—	Championship held up after a match against Los Destructores	
23	Los Destructores (Tony Arce and Volcano)	December 17, 1991	CMLL Martes De Coliseo	Mexico City	2	82	Defeated Los Metálicos in the rematch	
Asistencia, Asesoría y Administración de Espectáculos (AAA)
24	Misterioso and Volador	March 8, 1992	CMLL Domingos Arena Mexico	Mexico City	1	142		
25	Los Destructores (Tony Arce and Volcano)	July 28, 1992	AAA show	Monterrey, Nuevo León	3	73		
26	Misterioso and Volador	October 9, 1992	Sin Limite	Aguascalientes	2	127		
27	Los Destructores (Tony Arce (4) and Rocco Valente)	February 12, 1993	Sin Limite	Mexico City	1	574		
28	Heavy Metal and Latin Lover	September 9, 1994	AAA show	Monterrey, Nuevo León	1	84		
29	Fuerza Guerrera and Juventud Guerrera	December 2, 1994	Sin Limite	Mexico City	1	181		
30	Latin Lover (2) and Panterita del Ring	June 1, 1995	AAA Television taping	Texcoco, Mexico State	1	109		
31	Fuerza Guerrera and Juventud Guerrera	September 18, 1995	Sin Limite	Nuevo Laredo, Tamaulipas	2	74 (Note: The exact date Los Guerreras were stripped of the championship is uncertain, which means that the reign lasted between 71 and 104 days.)		
—	Vacated	December 1995	—	—	—	—	Championship vacated when Promo Azteca and AAA split which meant Fuerza Guerrera left the promotion	
†	Juventud Guerrera and Psicosis	January 12, 1996	AAA show	Nezahualcoyotl, Mexico State	1		Defeated Volador and El Mexicano for vacant title, the Mexican wrestling commission returns belts to Guerreras stating that they never lost the titles	
—	Vacated	August 1996	—	—	—	—	Championship vacated when Fuerza and Juventud Guerrera wrestle for different organizations	
32	Fuerza Guerrera (3) and Mosco de la Merced	July 20, 1997	Top Win Promotions show	Naucalpan, Mexico State	1	323	Defeated Perro Aguayo and Perro Aguayo Jr. in tournament final. The original Mosco de la Merced left AAA in the fall of 1997 and was replaced by Mosco de la Merced (II), without the promotion ever acknowledging the switch.	
33	Perro Aguayo and Perro Aguayo Jr.	June 7, 1998	Triplemanía VI	Chihuahua, Chihuahua	1	329		
34	Los Vipers (Abismo Negro and Electroshock)	May 2, 1999	Sin Limite	Manzanillo, Colima	1	189		
35	Hator and The Panther	November 7, 1999	Sin Limite	Monterrey, Nuevo León	1	182		
36	Los Vipers (Abismo Negro and Electroshock)	May 7, 2000	Sin Limite	Monterrey, Nuevo León	2	63		
37	Perro Aguayo Jr. (2) and Héctor Garza	July 9, 2000	AAA show	Osaka, Japan	1	61		
38	Los Consagrados (Pirata Morgan and El Texano)	September 8, 2000	Sin Limite	Tijuana, Baja California	1	429		
39	Máscara Sagrada and La Parka Jr.	November 11, 2001	Sin Limite	Monterrey, Nuevo León	1	159		
40	Chessman and Electroshock (3)	April 19, 2002	AAA show	Torreón, Coahuila	1	427		
41	Octagón and La Parka (2)	June 20, 2003	Sin Limite	Xalapa, Veracruz	1	3,110	La Parka was previously known under the name La Parka Jr. Sometime during his reign the title became recognized on the Mexican independent circuit.	
Mexican independent circuit
—	Deactivated	December 25, 2011 (NET)	—	—	—	—	December 25, 2011 is the date of team's last title defence.	
Consejo Mundial de Lucha Libre (CMLL)
42	Atlantis Jr. and Flyer	March 13, 2020	Super Viernes	Mexico City, Mexico	1	483	Defeated El Hijo de Villano III and Templario in a 16-team tournament final	
43	Atrapasuenos (Espiritu Negro and Rey Cometa)	July 9, 2021	CMLL	Mexico City, Mexico	1	87		
44	Felino Jr. and Polvora	October 4, 2021	Lunes Clásico	Mexico City, Mexico	1	167		
45	La Fuerza Tapatia (Esfinge and Fugaz)	March 20, 2022	Domingo Familiar	Mexico City, Mexico	1	1,668		
46	Las Fieras del Ring (Rugido and Black Tiger (IX))	June 9, 2023	Domingo Familiar	Mexico City, Mexico	1	1,222+		

== Combined reigns ==
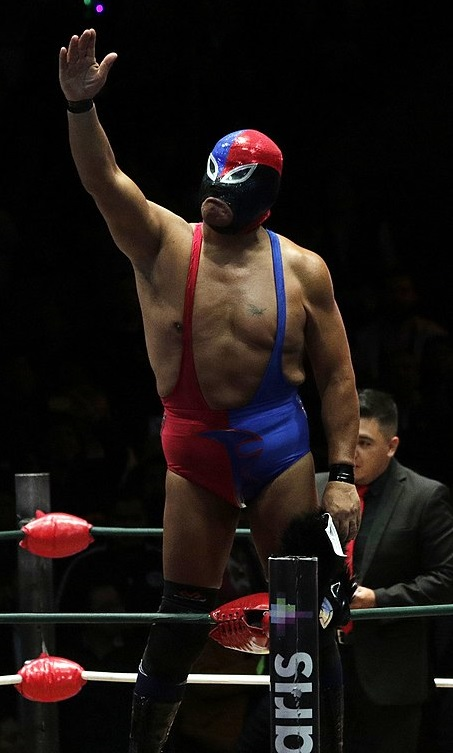
Fuerza Guerrera, who held the championship with his son Juventud Guerrera and Mosco de la Merced.

=== By team ===
Key
†	Indicates the current champion
¤	The exact length of at least one title reign is uncertain.

Rank	Team	No. of reigns	Combined days
1	Octagón and La Parka	1	3,110
2	Las Fieras del Ring (Black Tiger (IX) and Rugido) †	1	1,192+
3	Cachorro Mendoza and Ringo Mendoza	1	1,029
4	Ángel Azteca and Atlantis	1	813
5	Los Destructores (Tony Arce and Rocco Valente)	1	574
6	Atlantis Jr. and Flyer	1	483
7	La Fuerza Tapatia (Esfinge and Fugaz)	1	476
8	Los Consagrados (Pirata Morgan and El Texano)	1	429
9	Chessman and Electroshock	1	427
10	Los Infernales (Masakre and MS-1)	1	344
10	Los Hermanos Dinamita (Cien Caras and Máscara Año 2000)	1	344
10	Los Destructores (Tony Arce and Volcano)	3	344
13	Perro Aguayo and Perro Aguayo Jr.	1	329
14	Fuerza Guerrera and Mosco de la Merced	1	323
15	Bestia Salvaje and Pierroth Jr.	1	287
16	Misterioso and Volador	2	269
17	Fuerza Guerrera and Juventud Guerrera	2	255¤
18	Los Vipers (Abismo Negro and Electroshock)	2	252
19	Cien Caras and Sangre Chicana	1	199
20	Hator and The Panther	1	182
21	Tony Benetto and Rayo de Jalisco Jr.	1	170
22	Felino Jr. and Polvora	1	167
23	Máscara Sagrada and La Parka Jr.	1	159
24	Latin Lover and Panterita del Ring	1	109
25	Heavy Metal and Latin Lover	1	84
26	Atrapasuenos (Espiritu Negro and Rey Cometa)	1	87
27	Ángel Azteca and Volador	1	81
28	Perro Aguayo Jr. and Héctor Garza	1	61
29	Los Metálicos (Oro and Plata)	1	6

=== By wrestler ===
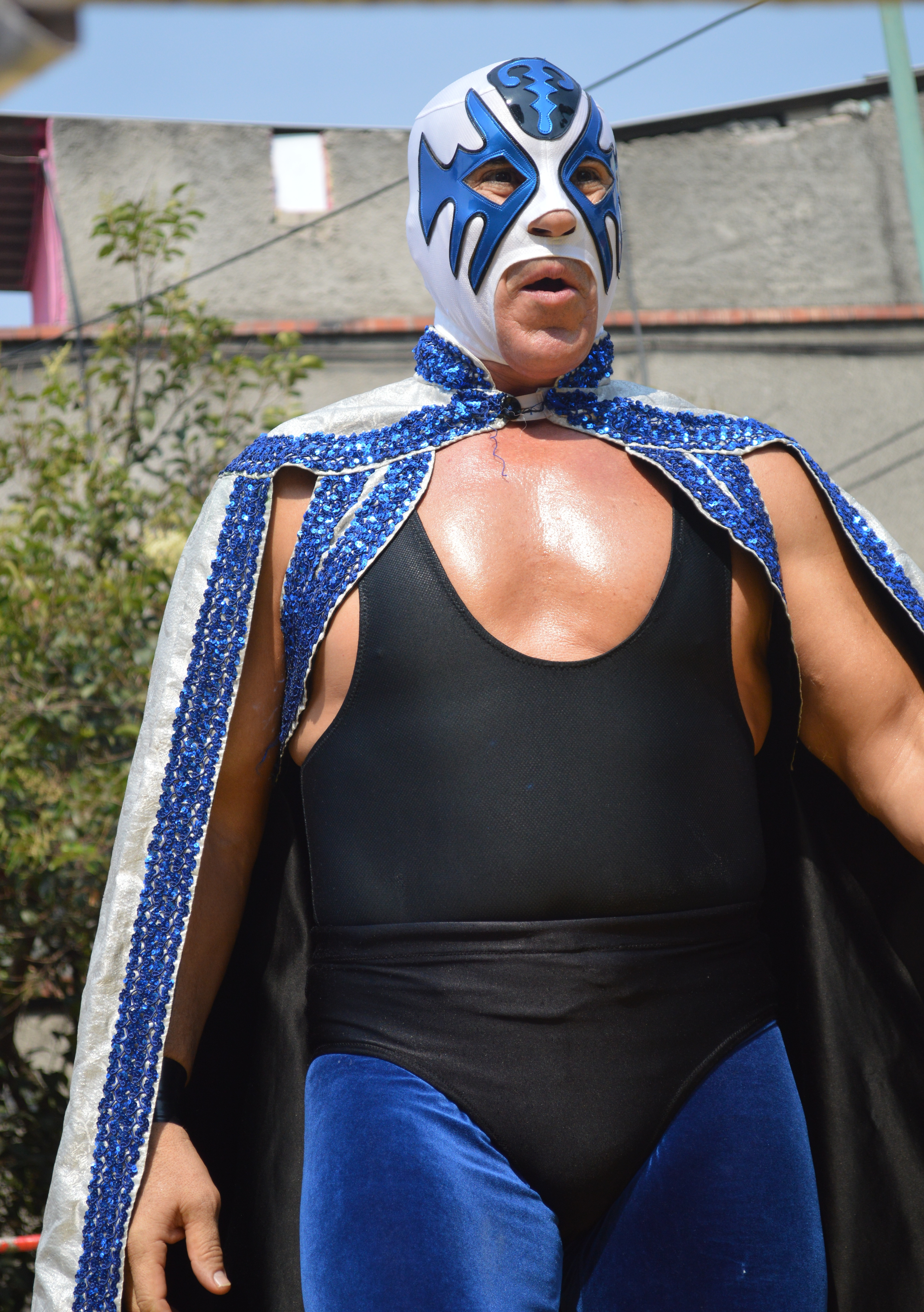
Atlantis held the championship for 780 days with Ángel Azteca.

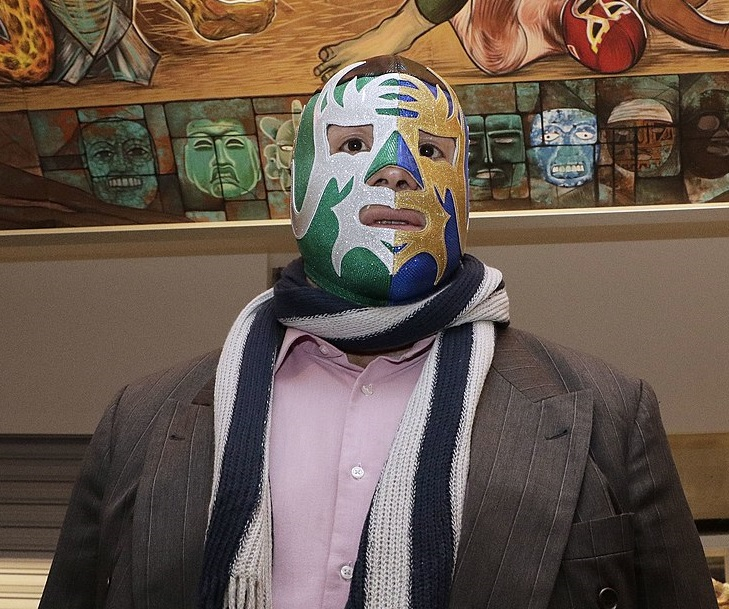
Máscara Año 2000 held the championship with his brother Cien Caras.

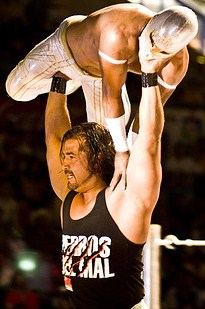
Héctor Garza (black shirt) was a one-time champion.

Rank	Wrestler	No. of reigns	Combined days
1	La Parka Jr./La Parka	2	3,269
2	Octagón	1	3,110
3	Magnus †	1	1,192+
3	Rugido †	1	1,192+
5	Cachorro Mendoza	1	1,029
5	Ringo Mendoza	1	1,029
7	Tony Arce	4	918
8	Ángel Azteca	2	894
9	Atlantis	1	780
10	Electroshock	3	679
11	Fuerza Guerrera	3	578¤
12	Rocco Valente	1	574
13	Cien Caras	2	543
14	Atlantis Jr.	1	483
14	Flyer	1	483
16	Esfinge	1	476
16	Fugaz	1	476
18	El Texano	1	429
18	Pirata Morgan	1	429
20	Chessman	1	427
21	Perro Aguayo Jr.	2	390
22	Volador	3	350
23	Máscara Año 2000	1	344
23	Volcano	3	344
23	Masakre	1	344
23	MS-1	1	344
27	Perro Aguayo	1	329
28	Mosco de la Merced	1	323
29	Bestia Salvaje	1	287
29	Pierroth Jr.	1	287
31	Misterioso	2	269
32	Juventud Guerrera	2	255¤
33	Abismo Negro	2	252
34	Sangre Chicana	1	199
35	Latin Lover	2	193
36	Hator	1	182
36	The Panther	1	182
38	Rayo de Jalisco Jr.	1	170
38	Tony Benetto	1	170
40	Felino Jr.	1	167
40	Polvora	1	167
42	Máscara Sagrada	1	159
43	Panterita del Ring	1	109
44	Espiritu Negro	1	87
44	Rey Cometa	1	87
46	Heavy Metal	1	84
47	Héctor Garza	1	61
48	Oro	1	6
48	Plata	1	6
