= El Coyote (wrestler) =

Mexican professional wrestler

Personal information
- Born: Unrevealed; November 1, 1997 (age 28) Villa Mainero, Tamaulipas

Professional wrestling career
- Ring name(s): Antaris; El Coyote
- Billed height: 1.74 m (5 ft 8 1/2 in)
- Billed weight: 86 kg (190 lb)
- Trained by: Mr. Lince; Tony Salazar; Arkángel de la Muerte; Demus 3:16; Chacho Herodes
- Debut: 2010

El Coyote (born November 1, 1997, in Villa Mainero, Tamaulipas) is a Mexican professional wrestler currently working for the Mexican promotion Consejo Mundial de Lucha Libre (CMLL), portraying a rudo ("Bad guy") wrestling character. His real name is not a matter of public record, as is often the case with masked wrestlers in Mexico where their private lives are kept a secret from the wrestling fans.

His ring name, El Coyote, is inspired by an incident when he was a kid, when at his grandparents' ranch, he witnessed a coyote ate his grandmother's chickens.

== Career ==
Born in Villa Mainero, close to Ciudad Madero in northeastern Mexico, Coyote started his wrestling career in 2010, at 12 years old. As a kid, he also played football, basketball and volleyball and describes himself as a very restless, mischievous kid. Initially when he got in through wrestling, through his first professor Mr. Lince, he was working under the ring name Antaris, as a tecnico ("Good guy") character in Monterrey, Nuevo León where his trainer was based, as well as in his home state of Tamaulipas. He knew from the beginning that he wanted to perform as a heel, and thus switched his ring name to El Coyote during 2012. In 2013, he left for Mexico City to pursue his dream of becoming a professional. In interviews he stated he initially didn't know anyone and spent several days staying overnight outside the subway and not having money to eat.

=== Consejo Mundial de Lucha Libre (2016–present) ===
Eventually he would start training at Arena Mexico under Tony Salazar and Arkángel de la Muerte. He graduated from the Consejo Mundial de Lucha Libre school on a Sunday show August 2016 and started working regularly for the promotion in the opening matches. Right after his debut, he suffered a serious forearm injury, that kept him out of wrestling for most of late 2016 and early 2017. During late 2020 and 2021 he rose up in the rankings from an opening match wrestler to a midcard performer.

On Christmas Day 2021, El Coyote together with Euforia won the CMLL Torneo Gran Alternativa, an annual tag team-tournament where a rookie teams up with a more experienced wrestler. In the finals, they defeated Atlantis Jr. and Sangre Imperial to claim the trophy.

In 2023, he forms part of the group Los Chacales Del Ring with Pólvora and Shigeo Okumura with the ambition of challenging for the Mexican National Trios Championship. He has also worked singles matches with the likes of Audaz, Magia Blanca and Fuego to name a few.

== Championships and accomplishments ==
- Consejo Mundial de Lucha Libre

- Gran Alternativa tournament (2021) - with Euforia
- CMLL Bodybuilding Contest (2024 - Beginner)
