= Atlantis Jr. =

Mexican professional wrestler

- Altantis Jr. in June 2022

Personal information
- Born: Unrevealed (Note: Traditionally Mexican sources will not report on the birth name of a masked wrestler who has never been unmasked in the ring.); 1998 Mexico City, Mexico
- Parent: Atlantis (father)
- Relatives: El Hijo de Atlantis (brother); Atlantico (uncle)

Professional wrestling career
- Ring names: Atlantis Jr.; Tiburón
- Billed height: 1.82 m (6 ft 0 in)
- Billed weight: 87 kg (192 lb)
- Trained by: Ringo Mendoza; Virus; Arkangel de la Muerte; Último Guerrero; Último Dragoncito; Franco Columbo; Atlantis
- Debut: December 25, 2017

Atlantis Jr. (born 1998) is a Mexican professional wrestler signed to Consejo Mundial de Lucha Libre (CMLL). He also makes appearances for partner promotion New Japan Pro-Wrestling (NJPW). He portrays a técnico ("good guy") wrestling character.

He made his professional wrestling debut in late 2017 under the ring name Tiburón ("Shark"), but was revealed to be the son of luchador Atlantis in late 2018, when he changed his name to "Atlantis Jr." and began wearing the same mask as his father. Since then, he has held the NWA World Historic Light Heavyweight Championship, the Mexican National Tag Team Championship and the CMLL World Trios Championship. He has also won CMLL's Torneo Increible De Parejas, La Copa Junior and Torneo Gran Alternativa tournaments. Through a working relationship with CMLL, he also appeared for All Elite Wrestling (AEW) and Ring of Honor (ROH), where he is a former ROH World Television Champion.

His real name is not a matter of public record, as is often the case with masked wrestlers in Mexico where their private lives are kept a secret from the wrestling fans.

== Personal life ==
Atlantis Jr. was born in 1998, and is a son of professional wrestler Atlantis, and an older brother of El Hijo de Atlantis. With neither Atlantis nor Atlantis Jr. having been unmasked, Mexican published sources have not revealed their name as per lucha libre tradition. His uncle was a professional wrestler in the 1990s. Atlantis Jr. started training for a professional wrestling career at the age of 12; the only condition set was that he had to continue to study. He was trained first by his father, and later by the trainers at the Consejo Mundial de Lucha Libre (CMLL) wrestling school, through the contacts of his father. At the school, he was trained by Ringo Mendoza, Virus, Arkangel de la Muerte, Último Guerrero, Último Dragoncito and Franco Columbo over the subsequent eight years.

== Professional wrestling career ==
=== Early career (2017–2018) ===
In interviews, Atlantis Jr. stated that he made his professional wrestling debut in 2017, although he did not confirm if he used the ring name Tiburón ("Shark") early on or if he worked under a different, unrevealed, identity. The first documented match for Tiburón took place on April 21, 2018, as he teamed up with Divino Boy, defeating Rokambole Jr. and Tackle as part of the Promociones Tragedias 25. Aniversario Mr. Niebla show. His highest profile match at the time was the Dragon Scramble match that was part of the Toryumon Mexico Dragonmania XIII show, won by Argos.

=== Consejo Mundial de Lucha Libre (2018–present) ===
In late 2018, Atlantis and Consejo Mundial de Lucha Libre (CMLL) officially introduced Atlantis Jr., acknowledging his previous ring name and officially giving him a mask identical to the one worn by his father. Introduced with the nickname El Principe del Atlantis ("The Prince of Atlantis"), he mentioned wanting to continue the rivalry his father had with Villano III, as El Hijo del Villano III had begun working for CMLL shortly before his introduction. In his first match on Mexican soil, Atlantis Jr., his father and Místico defeated Bárbaro Cavernario, Templario and El Hijo del Villano III on January 29, 2019, at Arena Coliseo. Shortly after, he began wrestling at CMLL's main venue, Arena México. The second-generation rivalry between the Atlantis and Villano family led to Atlantis Jr. and El Hijo del Villano III's first one-on-one match on July 5, which ended in a double countout after both wrestlers fought outside the ring for too long. At Sin Piedad ("No Escape") on January 1, 2020, Atlantis Jr., Kraneo and Soberano Jr. lost to Cavernario, El Hijo del Villano III and Negro Casas.

Two months later, Atlantis Jr. teamed with Flyer in a 16-team tournament for the reintroduced Mexican National Tag Team Championship, defeating Los Cancerberos del Infierno (Cancerbero and Raziel) in the first round, Rey Cometa and Star Jr. in the quarter-finals and El Felino and Tiger in the semi-finals. On March 13, they defeated El Hijo del Villano III and Templario in the finals to win the title. On May 28, 2021, Atlantis Jr. and his father took part in the family-oriented Copa Dinastias ("Dynasty Cup") tournament, defeating Último and Gran Guerrero in the first round before losing to Flyer and Volador Jr. in the quarter-finals. The following month, he was forced to team with El Hijo del Villano III for the Torneo Nacional de Parejas Increíbles ("National Incredible Pairs Tournament"), losing to Carístico and Virus in the first round. He and Flyer lost the title to Atrapasueños (Cometa and Espíritu Negro) on July 9, ending their reign at 483 days. On November 2, Atlantis Jr. won a ten-man torneo cibernetico, last eliminating Volador Jr. after outside interference from the already-eliminated Gran Guerrero, to become the number one contender for El Terrible's Rey del Inframundo ("King of the Underworld") championship, which he failed to win three days later. Later that month, he failed to win the Leyenda de Azul ("The Blue Legend") tournament after lastly being eliminated by Soberano Jr. The following month, he was paired with Sangre Imperial for the Torneo Gran Alternativa ("Great Alternative Tournament"), which pairs a rookie with a more experienced wrestler. They defeated Ángel de Oro and Halcón Suriano Jr. in the first round, El Terrible and Magnus in the quarter-finals and Disturbio and Último Guerrero in the semi-finals, before losing to El Coyote and Euforia in the finals.

Atlantis Jr. competed in the Reyes del Aire VIP ("Kings of the Air VIP") tournament on January 28, 2022, but was disqualified for ripping the mask of Stuka Jr., resulting in the latter's victory and starting a feud between the two. They won the Torneo Nacional de Parejas Increíbles on February 25 by defeating Averno and Místico in the finals, after which Stuka Jr. attacked and unmasked Atlantis Jr. On May 27, he defeated Místico to win the La Copa Junior ("The Junior Cup") tournament. Their feud led to a mask vs. mask Lucha de Apuestas ("bet match") in the main event of the CMLL 89th Anniversary Show on September 16, where Atlantis Jr. defeated Stuka Jr., forcing him to unmask and reveal his identity. During the feud, Atlantis Jr. had been working with Los Guerreros Laguneros on-and-off, occasionally going by Los Guerreros de la Atlantida, the name of the stable when his father was co-leader, although he ended his alliance with them in December. On February 4, 2023, Atlantis Jr. defeated Stuka Jr. for the NWA World Historic Light Heavyweight Championship, his first singles championship in CMLL. On June 2, Atlantis Jr., Star Jr. and Volador Jr. defeated Los Infernales (Euforia, Hechicero and Mephisto) for the CMLL World Trios Championship, becoming a double champion. At the CMLL 90th Anniversary Show on September 16, he, Máscara Dorada and Místico defeated Kevin Knight, Rocky Romero and TJP. On February 5, 2024, he, Star Jr. and Volador Jr. lost the title to Los Barbaros (Cavernario, Dragón Rojo Jr. and El Terrible), ending their reign at 248 days.

Atlantis Jr. then teamed with Soberano Jr. in the Torneo Nacional de Parejas Increíbles, defeating Disturbio and Virus and Hechicero and Stuka Jr. en route to the finals at Homenaje a Dos Leyendas on March 29, where they lost to Dorada and Romero. At the CMLL 91st Anniversary Show on September 13, he, Último Guerrero and Volador Jr. defeated Orange Cassidy, Romero and Satoshi Kojima. On September 27, he successfully defended the NWA World Historic Light Heavyweight Championship against Soberano Jr. at Noche de Campeones ("Night of Champions"). On June 15, 2025, Atlantis Jr. and his father defeated Blue Panther and El Hijo de Blue Panther in the finals of the Copa Dinastias. At the CMLL 92nd Anniversary Show on September 19, he and El Sky Team (Dorada and Neón) defeated Hechicero, Volador Jr. and Zandokan Jr. After retaining the title against Xelhua on September 26 at Noche de Campeones, they won the Torneo Gran Alternativa on December 19 by defeating Ángel de Oro and Yutani in the finals. On May 27, 2026, Atlantis Jr. announced that he was sidelined with a knee injury for an unknown period of time after injuring it during a six-man tag team match three days prior. He had been scheduled to face Villano III Jr. in the finals of the La Copa Junior VIP, and was replaced by Zandokan Jr.

=== New Japan Pro-Wrestling (2019–present) ===
As Atlantis Jr., he made his official in-ring debut for New Japan Pro-Wrestling (NJPW) on January 11, 2019, teaming with his father as part of the Fantastica Mania 2019 tour in Osaka. They lost to Sansón and Okumura, who stole their masks after the match. Atlantis Jr., in his first singles match, gained a small measure of revenge on the last day of the tour, defeating Okumura.

In February 2023, Atlantis Jr. and Último Guerrero won the Interfaction Tag Team Tournament, defeating Los Depredadores (Magia Blanca and Volador Jr.) in the first round and Los Ingobernables de Japón (BUSHI and Titán) in the finals. At Fighting Spirit Unleashed on October 28, he, his father, Hiroshi Tanahashi and Místico defeated Adrian Quest, Rocky Romero, Soberano Jr. and Tiger Mask. The following month, Atlantis Jr. was paired with Soberano Jr. for the 2023 World Tag League as part of Block B. They defeated the teams of Minoru Suzuki and Yuji Nagata, Rogue Army (Bad Luck Fale and Jack Bonza) and Yota Tsuji and Zandokan Jr. for a total of seven points, failing to advance to the semi-finals. During the Fantastica Mania 2026 tour in February 2026, he and his father competed in the Fantastica Mania 2026 Tag Team Tournament, defeating CozyMax (Okumura and Satoshi Kojima) in the first round before losing to Averno and Magnus in the semi-finals. On February 26, Atlantis Jr. lost the NWA World Historic Light Heavyweight Championship to Averno, ending his reign at 1,118 days.

=== All Elite Wrestling / Ring of Honor (2024–2025) ===
Through CMLL's working relationship with All Elite Wrestling (AEW), Atlantis Jr. made his debut on the February 28, 2024 episode of Dynamite in a loss to Chris Jericho. On June 28, he defeated Kyle Fletcher to win the ROH World Television Championship, a title from AEW's sister promotion Ring of Honor (ROH). At Death Before Dishonor on July 26, he successfully defended the title in a Survival of the Fittest match against Brian Cage, Johnny TV, Lee Johnson, Lio Rush and Shane Taylor. On October 12, at WrestleDream, Atlantis Jr. lost the ROH World Television Championship to Cage on the pre-show. At Final Battle on December 20, he defeated Mansoor after interference from Danhausen. At Fyter Fest on June 4, he and Templario lost to FTR (Cash Wheeler and Dax Harwood). Atlantis Jr. made his final appearance at Supercard of Honor on July 11, losing to AR Fox in a four-way match also involving Adam Priest and Johnson.

== Championships and accomplishments ==
- Consejo Mundial de Lucha Libre
  - NWA World Historic Light Heavyweight Championship (1 time)
  - CMLL World Trios Championship (1 time) – with Star Jr. and Volador Jr.
  - Mexican National Tag Team Championship (1 time) – with Flyer
  - Mexican National Tag Team Title Tournament (2020) – with Flyer
  - La Copa Junior (2022)
  - Torneo Increible De Parejas (2022) – with Stuka Jr.
  - Copa Dinastía (2025) – with Atlantis
  - Gran Alternativa (2025) - with Xelhua
  - Torneo Heredro (2022) – with Atlantis
  - Cuadrangular Eliminatorio De Parejas Increible Tournament (2022) – with Stuka Jr.
  - Copa Bobby Bonales (2025)
- New Japan Pro-Wrestling
  - Interfaction Tag Team Tournament (2023) – with Ultimo Guerrero
- Pro Wrestling Illustrated
  - Ranked No. 134 of the top 500 singles wrestlers in the PWI 500 in 2026
- Ring of Honor
  - ROH World Television Championship (1 time)
  - Survival of the Fittest (2024)
- Universal Wrestling Entertainment
  - UWE World Tag Team Championship (1 time) – with El Hijo de Octagón

== Luchas de Apuestas record ==
Winner (wager)	Loser (wager)	Location	Event	Date	Notes
Atlantis Jr. (mask)	Stuka Jr. (mask)	Mexico City, Mexico	CMLL 89th Anniversary Show	September 16, 2022	
