= Fugaz =

Mexican professional wrestler

Personal information
- Born: April 12, 1996 (age 30) Guadalajara, Jalisco, Mexico
- Family: El Brujo (father); Chucho Garcia (grandfather)

Professional wrestling career
- Ring names: Cometa; Fugaz
- Billed height: 169 cm (5 ft 7 in)
- Trained by: Chucho Garcia; El Brujo; Ultimo Guerrero
- Debut: January 13, 2013

Fugaz (born April 12, 1996) is the ring name of a Mexican professional wrestler, currently working for the promotion Consejo Mundial de Lucha Libre (CMLL). Fugaz's real name is not a matter of public record, as is often the case with masked wrestlers in Mexico where their private lives are kept a secret from the wrestling fans. He is the son of professional wrestler El Brujo, the grandson of wrestler "Chucho Garcia" and previously wrestled under the ring name Cometa.

== Professional wrestling career ==
Fugaz whose ring name was (Cometa) started his professional wrestling career in 2013 and in-ring till date he has played a total of 245 matches since the beginning of his career

Alter egos:

Cometa

Fugaz

Roles:

Singles Wrestler

Tag Team Wrestler

Beginning of in-ring career:

2013

In-ring experience:

10 years

Trainer:

Chucho Garcia, El Brujo & Ultimo Guerrero

== Championships and accomplishments ==
- Consejo Mundial de Lucha Libre
  - Mexican National Tag Team Championship (1 time) – with Esfinge (Note: The Mexican National Tag Team Championship is sanctioned by the Mexico City Wrestling Commission but under the control of CMLL who make the day to day decisions.)
