= Diamond (wrestler) =

Mexican professional wrestler

Personal information
- Born: Unrevealed (Note: Traditionally Mexican sources will not report on the birth name of a masked wrestler who has never been unmasked in the ring.); September 5, 1996 (age 29) Mexico City, Mexico
- Relative: La Lechuza (grandfather)

Professional wrestling career
- Ring names: Príncipe Diamante; Diamond
- Trained by: Arkangel de la Muerte; Franco Colombo; El Hijo del Gladiador; Ringo Mendoza; Virus
- Debut: 2010

Diamond (born September 5, 1996) is the ring name of a Mexican professional wrestler, working for promotion Consejo Mundial de Lucha Libre (CMLL) as a tecnico (the protagonist or face characters in professional wrestling). He originally worked under the ring name Príncipe Diamante (Spanish for "Prince Diamond") until January 2020. Diamond's real name is not a matter of public record, which is traditional for masked wrestlers who have never lost their mask in the ring. His grandfather was also a wrestler, known as "La Lechuza" ("The Owl").

== Personal life ==
Príncipe Diamante's real name has not been revealed, nor reported on, which is a tradition in professional wrestling style originating from Mexico, lucha libre, when a wrestler has not been unmasked. His grandfather was also a wrestler, known as "La Lechuza" ("The Owl").

== Professional wrestling career ==
Príncipe Diamante began his in-ring career in 2010, although his first confirmed match under the name "Príncipe Diamante" was in 2014. Later that same year he was one of nine wrestlers putting his mask on the line in an Invasion RCH show. Príncipe Diamante retained his mask while Atomic Star ended up unmasking.

=== Lucha Libre Elite (2014–2016) ===
In late 2014, Príncipe Diamante began working for Lucha Libre Elite (LLE), appearing at the very first LLE show on November 13, 2014, teaming with Dinamic Black to defeat Flyer and Magnus. Through LLE's working relationship with Consejo Mundial de Lucha Libre, Príncipe Diamante competed in CMLL's 2014 bodybuilding competition, winning its beginners division. The following year, he once again won the beginners category. On February 28, 2016, Príncipe Diamante unsuccessfully challenged Eléctrico for the Mexican National Lightweight Championship at LLE's Infierno Elite show. In his final Lucha Libre Elite match, Príncipe Diamante and Ciclon Ramirez Jr. lost to Los Cancerberos del Infierno (Cancerbero and Raziel).

=== Consejo Mundial de Lucha Libre (2015–present) ===
His first match with CMLL saw Príncipe Diamante compete in the Mini-Estrellas division as he teamed up with Astral and Astro to defeat the trio of Ares el Guerrero, Demus 3:16 and Mini Jocker. When he returned to CMLL the following September he was moved from the Mini-Estrella division and instead competed in the regular division. In November Príncipe Diamante won CMLL's annual bodybuilding competition, being voted "Mr. CMLL" Príncipe Diamante and Robin teamed up for a tournament to determine the next CMLL Arena Coliseo Tag Team Championship team. The duoo lost in the first round to Magnus and Sensei.

In April 2018 Príncipe Diamante was one of 16 wrestlers who competed in the Copa Nueva Valores tournament. He defeated Maquiavelo in the first round, Príncipe Daniel in the quarter-finals but ended up losing to eventual tournament winner Magia Blanca in the semifinals. 2018 also saw Príncipe Diamante participated in the 2018Gran Alternativa tournament, a tag team tournament where CMLL paired up a rookie and a veteran for the tournament. Príncipe Diamante and veteran Valiente lost to Audaz and Kraneo in the opening round. In June 2019 Príncipe Diamante and 9 other wrestlers competed in a torneo cibernetico elimination match for the vacant CMLL World Lightweight Championship, which saw Audaz and Kawato-San win the match, while Príncipe Diamante was eliminated.

In the fall of 2019, Príncipe Diamante became involved in a long running storyline feud with Espiritu Negro, one that often saw Espiritu Negro tear Diamante's mask apart or completely off during matches. Espiritu Negro and his La Ola Negra teammates (Akuma and Espanto Jr.) cheat to defeat Príncipe Diamante. On the November 26 show in Arena Mexico, the two wrestled to a double disqualification as they tore the masks off each other during the match. Often the matches would be followed by a mask match, or Lucha de Apuestas ("Bet match") challenge. On December 10, CMLL announced that they had signed a Lucha de Apuestas match between Príncipe Diamante and Espiritu Negro for the January 1, 2020 Sin Piedad show.

==== Diamond (2020 present) ====
During the January 15, 2020 episode of CMLL informa, it was revealed that he would be using a new ring name going forward, Diamond, and that he would be working in a new, silver costume, that resembled the mask of El Santo and his son El Hijo del Santo.

== Other media ==
In 2018, Príncipe Diamante appeared on the Mexican Televisa channels Like show, playing a fictionalized version of himself.

== Championships and accomplishments ==
- Consejo Mundial de Lucha Libre
  - CMLL Bodybuilding Competition (Beginners 2014, Beginners 2015, Mr. CMLL 2016, Intermediate 2023)

== Luchas de Apuestas record ==
Winner (wager)	Loser (wager)	Location	Event	Date	Notes
Príncipe Diamante (mask)	Espíritu Negro (mask)	Mexico City	Sin Piedad	January 1, 2020	
