= Rey Cometa =

Mexican Luchador (born 1983)

Personal information
- Born: Mario Alberto González; March 11, 1983 (age 43) Queretaro, Queretaro
- Relatives: Espíritu Negro (brother); Espíritu Negro Jr. (nephew)

Professional wrestling career
- Ring name(s): Rey Cometa; Rey Cometa Jr.
- Billed height: 1.72 m (5 ft 7 1/2 in)
- Billed weight: 83 kg (183 lb)
- Trained by: Kaoma Jr. Atomico de Oro; Dragon de Oriente I Dragon de Oriente II; Satánico
- Debut: April 30, 1999

Mario Alberto González (born March 11, 1983), better known by his ring name Rey Cometa (Spanish for "King Comet"), is a Mexican professional wrestler, working for the Mexican promotion Consejo Mundial de Lucha Libre (CMLL). Rey Cometa first gained national exposure when he worked for Asistencia Asesoría y Administración (AAA) from 2005 until 2008. In AAA, he was a part of the group Real Fuerza Aérea, consisting of young high flying wrestlers. As is usual with masked wrestlers in Mexico, Cometa's real name was not a matter of public record until he lost his mask in a match in September 2012. With his brother Espíritu Negro as Los Atrapa Sueños ("Dream Catchers"), they are one-time Mexican National Tag Team Champions and one-time Mexican National Trios Champions in their first reign (alongside Dulce Gardenia). He is also a former holder of the Mexican National Welterweight Championship.

== Professional wrestling career ==
González was trained by Dragon de Oriente I, II, Kaoma Jr., and Atomico de Oro before making his debut on April 30, 1999, at the age of 16. Dragon de Oriente I originally worked as "Rey Cometa", but changed to "Dragon de Oriente I" in 1989. Dragon decided to give the "Rey Cometa" name to the best student in his class; initially González worked as "Rey Cometa Jr." but the "Junior" part was quietly dropped within a year of his debut. In 2003 Rey Cometa defeated his trainer Kaoma Jr. and Sarpa de Tigre in a Luchas de Apuesta (bet match) where both the losers had their hair shaved off after the match. During his time on the Mexican independent circuit Rey Cometa won the *Queretaro State Lightweight Championship once.

=== AAA (2005–2008) ===
In 2005 Rey Cometa began working for Asistencia Asesoría y Administración (AAA), one of Mexico's largest professional wrestling promotions. His first appearance of significance came when he was on the losing side of a match at AAA's 2005 Guerra de Titanes wrestling show, teaming with Laredo Kid, Hombre Sin Miedo, and Principe Zafiro, losing to Kaoma Jr., Oscuridad, Rio Bravo, and Tito Santana. In 2006, Rey Cometa and Laredo Kid became two of the founding members of a group called Real Fuerza Aérea (Spanish for "the Royal Air Force"), a group of young high-flying wrestlers. Real Fuerza Area (Rey Cometa, Laredo Kid, Super Fly, and Nemesis) challenged the Black Family (Dark Ozz, Dark Espiritu, Dark Cuervo, and Dark Escoria for the Mexican National Atómicos Championship at Triplemanía XIV, but the match ended in a no contest. As a result of the match the Atómicos title was vacated, but the Black Family won the rematch the following month. Rey Cometa was one of the participants in the 2007 Alas de Oro tournament, but did not win. At the 2007 Verano de Escandalo event Cometa teamed with Aero Star, Estrellita, and Octagoncito, losing to the team of Alfa, Faby Apache, Gran Apache, and Mini Chessman. Subsequently Real Fuerza Aérea (Cometa, Aero Star, and Super Fly) defeated The Black Family (Dark Curervo, Dark Ozz, and Dark Escoria) on the undercard of the 2007 Guerra de Titanes show. In 2008 AAA focused more on Aero Star and Super Fly in storylines that took them away from Real Fuerza Aérea with the remaining members dropping down the card, if they wrestled at all. After working only sporadically for several months Rey Cometa, as well as Pegasso, left AAA. Initially the two worked for International Wrestling Revolution Group (IWRG) as Real Fuerza Aérea but soon after began working for Consejo Mundial de Lucha Libre (CMLL), Mexico's largest and oldest wrestling promotion.

=== Consejo Mundial de Lucha Libre (2009–present) ===
Pegasso and Rey Cometa initially used the Real Fuerza Aérea name in CMLL as well, but quickly abandoned it when AAA objected to the use of the name. Rey Cometa and Pegasso worked as a regular team in CMLL, often working the lower end of the card. On April 7, 2009, Rey Cometa was one of 10 men competing for the vacant CMLL World Super Lightweight Championship but he was eliminated half-way through the match, which was won by Máscara Dorada instead. Rey Cometa teamed with Blue Panther to participate in the 2009 Gran Alternativa tournament, losing to Mr. Niebla and Tiger Kid in the first round. On October 18, 2009, Rey Cometa was one of 12 wrestlers who put his mask on the line in a 12-man Luchas de Apuestas cage match. He was the sixth person to escape the cage keeping his mask safe; the final saw Pólvora pin Tigre Blanco to unmask him. Rey Cometa teamed with Pegasso and Rouge to defeat Los Guerreros Tuareg (Hooligan, Skándalo and Loco Max) in the opening match of CMLL's year end show, Sin Salida, with Pegasso scoring the deciding fall. On September 14, 2012, at CMLL's 79th Anniversary Show, Cometa was defeated by Puma King in a Lucha de Apuestas and was as a result forced to unmask and reveal his real name.

Following the loss of his mask Rey Cometa slowly moved from working against Puma King to helping Stuka Jr. in his storyline feud with Japanese wrestler Namajague that saw Namajague and his team mate Okumura attack Stuka Jr. on more than one occasion until Rey Cometa came to his rescue. The storyline between the two teams continued to escalate over late 2012 and into 2013 as the two sides faced off almost weekly, often with inconclusive results. On March 15, 2013, Stuka Jr. and Rey Cometa defeated La Fiebre Amarilla (Namajague and Okumura) in the main event of the 2013 Homenaje a Dos Leyendas show, forcing Okumura to have all his hair shaved off and Namajague to be unmasked and reveal his real name. The storyline between Namajague and Rey Cometa did not end after the unmasking, instead it switched to an individual storyline between the two, that included Namajague breaking a pane of glass over Rey Cometa's head during a one-on-one match. The conflict led to CMLL signing a one-on-one Lucha de Apuestas between the pair, with both their hair on the line, to take place on the April 26, 2013 Arena Mexico 57th Anniversary Show. Cometa won the match by two falls to one, and Namajague's hair was shaved after the match. From January 14 to 19, 2014, Cometa worked the New Japan Pro-Wrestling (NJPW) and CMLL co-produced Fantastica Mania 2014 tour, which marked his debut in Japan. For the entire tour, Cometa worked undercard matches, alongside Stuka Jr. On September 19, 2014 Rey Cometa lost to Cavernario in one of the feature matches of the CMLL 81st Anniversary Show, losing a Luchas de Apuestas match and for the first time in his career he was shaved bald after the match. On June 10, 2016, Rey Cometa defeated Bárbaro Cavernario to win the Mexican National Welterweight Championship. On July 1, Cometa lost his hair to Cavernario in another Lucha de Apuestas between the two. On May 12, 2017 Rey Cometa lost the welterweight championship to Soberano Jr.

==== Los Atrapa Sueños (2020–present) ====
In early 2020, the González brothers began talking about working as a team, despite Rey Cometa being a tecnico and Espíritu Negro working as a rudo. The brothers did team together for one match as part of the 2020 Torneo Nacional de Parejas Increíbles ("National Incredible Pairs tournament"), losing in the first round to Ángel de Oro and Sansón. This was the only time the brothers teamed up prior to CMLL shutting down due to the COVID-19 pandemic in March 2020. When CMLL returned they announced that the fans would be voting on who would challenge for the CMLL World Tag Team Championship at the CMLL 87th Anniversary Show. One of the options presented to the fans was Rey Cometa and Espíritu Negro, collectively called Los Atrapa Sueños ("The Dream Catchers"). In the end the González brothers won the fan poll with almost 11,000 more votes than the runner up. Due to the overall votes the match was positioned as the main event as it garnered more votes than the other six polls. Los Atrapa Sueños' first match together took place on the September 4 Super Viernes show, where they defeated Audaz and Guerrero Maya Jr. This was followed by a victory over Los Cancerberos del Infierno (Cancerbero and Raziel) the following week, and finally Hechicero and Mephisto the week prior to the anniversary show. At the CMLL 87th Anniversary Show, they lost to La Alianza de Plata y Oro (Carístico and Místico).

On July 9, 2021, Los Atrapa Sueños defeated the pairing of Atlantis Jr. and Flyer to win the Mexican National Tag Team Championship. On October 4, they were defeated by the pairing of Felino Jr. and Pólvora, ending their reign at 87 days. Dulce Gardenia would later join Los Atrapa Sueños, and on May 28, 2022, the trio won a four-way match for the vacant Mexican National Trios Championship.

== Championships and accomplishments ==
- Consejo Mundial de Lucha Libre
  - Mexican National Welterweight Championship (1 time)
  - Mexican National Tag Team Championship (1 time) – with Espíritu Negro
  - Mexican National Trios Championship (1 time) – with Dulce Gardenia and Espíritu Negro
- Pro Wrestling Illustrated
  - PWI ranked him #246 of the 500 best singles wrestlers of the PWI 500 in 2016
- Mexican local promotions

- Queretaro State Lightweight Championship (1 time)

== Luchas de Apuestas record ==
Winner (wager)	Loser (wager)	Location	Event	Date	Notes
Rey Cometa and Dragon de Oriente (masks)	Kaoma Jr. and Sarpa de Tigre (hair)	N/A	Live event	2003	
Puma King (mask)	Rey Cometa (mask)	Mexico City	CMLL 79th Anniversary Show	September 14, 2012	
Stuka Jr. (mask) and Rey Cometa (hair)	La Fiebre Amarilla (Okumura (hair) and Namajague (mask))	Mexico City	Homenaje a Dos Leyendas	March 15, 2013	
Rey Cometa (hair)	Namajague (hair)	Mexico City	Arena Mexico 57th Anniversary Show	April 26, 2013	
Cavernario (hair)	Rey Cometa (hair)	Mexico City	CMLL 81st Anniversary Show	September 19, 2014	
Bárbaro Cavernario (hair)	Rey Cometa (hair)	Mexico City	International Gran Prix	July 1, 2016	
Akuma & Dark Magic (hair)	Espíritu Negro & Rey Cometa (hair)	Mexico City	CMLL Atlantis 40th Anniversary Show	July 14, 2023	
