= Homenaje a Salvador Lutteroth =

Homenaje a Salvador Lutteroth may refer to any of these events:

- Homenaje a Salvador Lutteroth (1996)
- Homenaje a Salvador Lutteroth (1997)
- Homenaje a Salvador Lutteroth (1998)

== See also ==
- Homenaje a Dos Leyendas, a series of annual wrestling events
- Homenaje a Dos Leyendas: El Santo y Salvador Lutteroth (disambiguation)
