= 38. Aniversario de Arena México =

Mexican professional wrestling show

38. Aniversario de Arena México; CMLL International Gran Prix (1994)
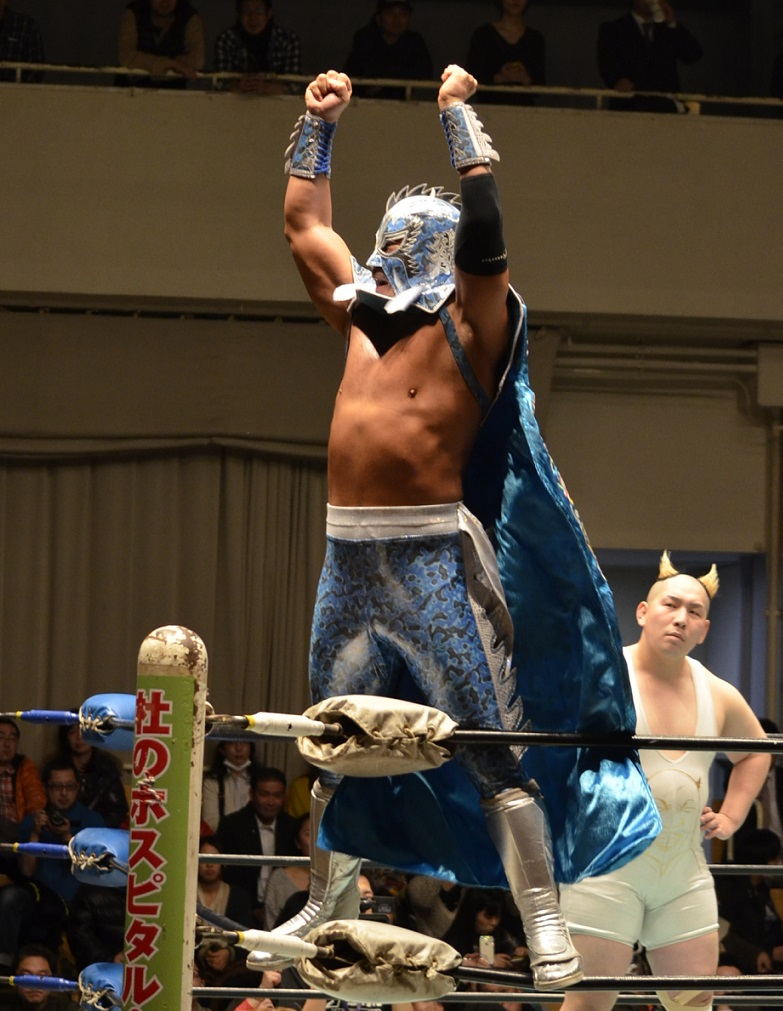
- Último Dragón, representing Japan
- Promotion: Consejo Mundial de Lucha Libre
- Date: April 15, 1994
- City: Mexico City, Mexico
- Venue: Arena México

Event chronology
← Previous; Juicio Final	Next → CMLL 61st Anniversary Show

CMLL International Gran Prix chronology
← Previous; First	Next → 1995

Aniversario de Arena México chronology
← Previous; 37.	Next → 39.

The 38. Aniversario de Arena México was a professional wrestling supercard show, scripted and produced by Consejo Mundial de Lucha Libre (CMLL), which featured the first ever CMLL International Gran Prix tournament. The event took place on April 15, 1994 and celebrated the 38th anniversary of the first show held in Arena México in April 1956, the arena that would become the main venue for CMLL and eventually be known as La Catedral de lucha libre ("The Cathedral of professional wrestling") and one of the most emblematic professional wrestling venues in the world. The International Gran Prix would become a regularly occurring tournament for CMLL in the years to follow.

Most of the matches on the show were dedicated to the first ever "International Gran Prix", a one night, 16-man single elimination tournament consisting of Mexican natives and a number of foreign wrestlers, some of which worked for CMLL on a regular basis (such as King Haku and Corazon de León) and others who were invited specially for the tournament (such as Yamato). The final match saw Rayo de Jalisco Jr. defeat King Haku to win the International Gran Prix.

== Production ==
=== Background ===
In 1933 professional wrestling promoter Salvador Lutteroth held his first Lucha Libre show as Empresa Mexicana de Lucha Libre ("Mexican Wrestling Enterprise"; EMLL) at Arena Modelo. Lutteroth would later move EMLL to Arena Coliseo, but that venue turned out to be too small in the long run and Lutteroth funded the creation of Arena México on calle Doctor Lavista #203, Colonia Doctores. on the intersection of Dr.Rafael Lucio, Dr. Carmona and Valle. The building was completed in 1956 and is to this day the largest arena built specifically for professional wrestling. The arena opened in April, 1956 and ever since then EMLL has celebrated the Aniversario de Arena México in April of each year. In 1991 EMLL was renamed Consejo Mundial de Lucha Libre ("World Wrestling Enterprise"; CMLL), only three years after it became the oldest, still-active professional wrestling promotion in the world. The 2016 version of the Anniversary show will be the 60th show, making it the third longest annual professional wrestling show, after the CMLL Anniversary Shows that began in 1934 and the Arena Coliseo anniversary show that began in 1944.

Over the years the Aniversario de Arena México show has hosted significant headline matches including several Lucha de Apuestas, or bet matches, where the loser of the match was forced to unmask or have their hair shaved off. The first documented example of a Lucha de Apuesta match headlining a show was at the 12. Aniversario where Huracán Ramírez defeated El Enfermero, forcing him to unmask. (Note: Records of early anniversary shows are sparse leaving the posibiity that previous anniversary shows also had Lucha de Apuestas matches featured.)

=== Storylines ===
The CMLL Gran Prix show featured seventeen professional wrestling matches scripted by CMLL with some wrestlers involved in scripted feuds. The wrestlers portray either heels (referred to as rudos in Mexico, those that play the part of the "bad guys") or faces (técnicos in Mexico, the "good guy" characters) as they perform.

In early 1994, the Mexican professional wrestling promotion Consejo Mundial de Lucha Libre (CMLL) announced their first ever International Gran Prix tournament. The tournament followed the standard "single elimination" format and featured sixteen wrestlers in total, eight representing Mexico and eight "international" wrestlers. Some of these international wrestlers were already working for CMLL at the time, such as King Haku and Corazon de León while others came to Mexico specifically for the tournament such as Japanese wrestler Yamato.

== Tournament ==
=== Tournament overview ===
Name	Country	promotion
Atlantis	Mexico	Consejo Mundial de Lucha Libre
Black Magic	United Kingdom	Consejo Mundial de Lucha Libre
Brazo de Plata	Mexico	Consejo Mundial de Lucha Libre
Corazon de León	Canada	Consejo Mundial de Lucha Libre
Gran Markus Jr.	Mexico	Consejo Mundial de Lucha Libre
King Haku	Tonga	Wrestling Association-R
The Killer	"United States" (Note: The person wrestling as "The Killer" is Mexican, but the character is depicted as being from the United States)	Universal Wrestling Association
Miguel Pérez Jr.	Puerto Rico	International Wrestling Association
Pierroth Jr.	"Puerto Rico" (Note: The person wrestling as "Pierroth Jr." is Mexican, but the Consejo Mundial de Lucha Libre)	Consejo Mundial de Lucha Libre
Popetikus	Mexico	Consejo Mundial de Lucha Libre
Rayo de Jalisco Jr.	Mexico	Consejo Mundial de Lucha Libre
Silver King	Mexico	Consejo Mundial de Lucha Libre
Último Dragón	Japan	Wrestling Association-R
Vampiro Canadiense	Canada	Consejo Mundial de Lucha Libre
Dr. Wagner Jr.	Mexico	Consejo Mundial de Lucha Libre
Yamato	South Korea	Wrestling Association-R

== Tournament brackets ==
First round
King Haku	W
Último Dragón
Yamato	W
Vampiro
Miguel Pérez Jr.	W
Silver King
Atlantis	W
Corazon de León
6	Brazo de Plata	W
11	Killer
3	Dr. Wagner Jr.	W
14	Gran Markus Jr.
7	Pierroth Jr.	W
10	Black Magic
2	Popetikus
15	Rayo de Jalisco Jr.	W

Second round
King Haku	W
Yamato
Miguel Pérez Jr.	W
Atlantis
Brazo de Plata	W
Dr. Wagner Jr.
Pierroth Jr.
Rayo de Jalisco Jr.	W

Semifinals
Haku	W
Miguel Pérez Jr.
Brazo de Plata
Rayo de Jalisco Jr.	W

Final
King Haku
Rayo de Jalisco Jr.	W

== Aftermath ==
In 1995 CMLL brought the tournament back, creating an annual tournament held every year from 1995 through 1998 and then again in 2002, 2003 and finally from 2005 through 2008. The first five tournaments from 1994 through 1998 were all standard 16-man tournaments, but when CMLL brought the International Gran Prix tournament back in 2002 it was modified into a Torneo Cibernetico elimination match where an eight-man "Team Mexico" would face off against an eight-man "Team International" until only one team or wrestler survived.

Rayo de Jalisco Jr. won both the inaugural tournament as well as the 1998 International Gran Prix tournament, making him one of only two wrestlers to win the tournament twice. The other repeat winner was Último Guerrero, who won both the 2006 and 2007 International Gran Prixs. Headhunter A (1995) and Steel (1997) were the only "Team International" wrestlers to win a tournament prior to the 2008 International Gran Prix tournament. From 2009 through 2015 CMLL did not hold an International Gran Prix but they announced the return of the tournament in May 2016.

== Tournament show ==
No.	Results	Stipulations
1	America and Panico defeated Metalico and El Solar II	Best two-out-of-three falls tag team match
2	King Haku defeated Ultimo Dragon	1994 International Gran Prix First Round match
3	Yamato defeated Vampiro Canadiense	1994 International Gran Prix first round match
4	Miguel Pérez Jr. defeated Silver King	1994 International Gran Prix first round match
5	Atlantis defeated Corazon de Leon	1994 International Gran Prix first round match
6	Brazo de Plata defeated The Killer	1994 International Gran Prix first round match
7	Dr. Wagner Jr. defeated Gran Markus Jr.	1994 International Gran Prix first round match
8	Pierroth Jr. defeated Black Magic	1994 International Gran Prix first round match
9	Rayo de Jalisco Jr. defeated Popitekus	1994 International Gran Prix first round match
10	Miguel Pérez Jr. defeated Atlantis	1994 International Gran Prix quarter final match
11	King Haku defeated Yamato	1994 International Gran Prix quarter final match
12	Rayo de Jalisco Jr. defeated Pierroth Jr.	1994 International Gran Prix quarter final match
13	Brazo de Plata defeated Dr. Wagner Jr.	1994 International Gran Prix quarter final match
14	King Haku defeated Miguel Pérez Jr.	1994 International Gran Prix semi-final match
15	Rayo de Jalisco Jr. defeated Brazo de Plata	1994 International Gran Prix semi-final match
16	Rayo de Jalisco Jr. defeated King Haku	1994 International Gran Prix final match
17	Emilio Charles Jr. defeated La Fiera	Best two-out-of-three falls Lucha de Apuestas hair vs. hair match
