= CMLL International Gran Prix (1998) =

Mexican professional wrestling tournament

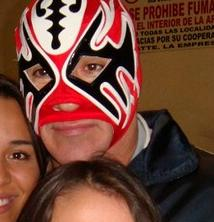
- Atlantis, defending Mexico's honor
- Promotion: Consejo Mundial de Lucha Libre
- Date: August 14, 1998
- City: Mexico City, Mexico
- Venue: Arena México

Event chronology
← Previous; Leyenda de Plata	Next → CMLL 65th Anniversary Show

International Gran Prix chronology
← Previous; 1997	Next → 2002

The CMLL International Gran Prix (1998) was a lucha libre, or professional wrestling, tournament produced and scripted by the Mexican professional wrestling promoter Consejo Mundial de Lucha Libre (CMLL; "World Wrestling Council" in Spanish) which took place on August 14, 1998 in Arena México, Mexico City, CMLL's main venue. The 1998 International Gran Prix was the fifth time CMLL has held an International Gran Prix tournament since 1994. All International Gran Prix tournaments have been a one-night tournament, always as part of CMLL's Friday night CMLL Super Viernes shows.

The fifth International Gran Prix was a one night, 16-man single elimination tournament consisting of Mexican natives and a number of foreign wrestlers, some of which worked for CMLL on a regular basis (such as The Headhunters) and others who were invited specially for the tournament (such as Ricky Santana). The final match saw Apolo Dantés defeat Rayo de Jalisco Jr. to win the International Gran Prix.

== Production ==
=== Background ===
In 1994 the Mexican professional wrestling promotion Consejo Mundial de Lucha Libre (CMLL) organized their first ever International Gran Prix tournament. The first tournament followed the standard "single elimination" format and featured sixteen wrestlers in total, eight representing Mexico and eight "international" wrestlers. In the end Mexican Rayo de Jalisco Jr. defeated King Haku in the finals to win the tournament. In 1995 CMLL brought the tournament back, creating an annual tournament held every year from 1995 through 1998 and then again in 2002, 2003 and finally from 2005 through 2008.

=== Storylines ===
The CMLL Gran Prix show featured four professional wrestling matches where wrestlers were matched up specifically for the tournament instead of as a result of pre-existing scripted feuds. The wrestlers themselves portray either faces (técnicos in Mexico, the "good guy" characters) or heels (referred to as rudos in Mexico, those that portray the "bad guys") as they perform for the fans before, during and after the matches.

== Tournament ==
=== Tournament overview ===
Name	Country	promotion
Atlantis	Mexico	CMLL
El Boriqua	Puerto Rico	CMLL
Black Magic	United Kingdom	CMLL
Emilio Charles Jr.	Mexico	CMLL
Cien Caras	Mexico	CMLL
Apolo Dantés	Mexico	CMLL
Headhunter A	Puerto Rico	Freelancer
Headhunter B	Puerto Rico	Freelancer
Máscara Año 2000	Mexico	CMLL
Miguel Pérez Jr.	Puerto Rico	Freelancer
Mr. Niebla	Mexico	CMLL
Rayo de Jalisco Jr.	Mexico	CMLL
Ricky Santana	Puerto Rico	Freelancer
Universo 2000	Mexico	CMLL
Vampiro	Mexico	CMLL
Kevin Quinn	United States	Freelancer

=== Tournament brackets ===
Round of 16
Headhunter B
Máscara Año 2000	W
Miguel Pérez Jr.	W
Atlantis
Emilio Charles Jr.	W
Kevin Quinn
Apolo Dantés	W
Black Magic
Headhunter A	W
Universo 2000
Mr. Niebla
El Boriqua	W
Rayo de Jalisco Jr.	W
Vampiro
Ricky Santana	W
Cien Caras

Quarterfinals
Máscara Año 2000	W
Miguel Pérez Jr.
Emilio Charles Jr.
Apolo Dantés	W
Headhunter A	W
El Boriqua
Rayo de Jalisco Jr.	W
Ricky Santana

Semifinals
Máscara Año 2000
Apolo Dantés	W
Headhunter A
Rayo de Jalisco Jr.	W

Finals
Apolo Dantés
Rayo de Jalisco Jr.

=== Tournament show ===
No.	Results	Stipulations
1	El Oriental and Sendero defeated Virus and Zumbido	Best two-out-of-three falls tag team match
2	El Pantera, Mr. Águila, and Tarzan Boy defeated Karloff Lagarde Jr., Rey Bucanero, and Último Guerrero	Best two-out-of-three falls six-man tag team match
3	Máscara Año 2000 defeated Headhunter B	1998 International Gran Prix first round match
4	Miguel Pérez Jr. defeated Atlantis	1998 International Gran Prix first round match
5	Apolo Dantés defeated Black Magic	1998 International Gran Prix first round match
6	Emilio Charles Jr. defeated Kevin Quinn	1998 International Gran Prix first round match
7	Ricky Santana defeated Cien Caras by disqualification	1998 International Gran Prix first round match
8	Rayo de Jalisco Jr. defeated Vampiro Canadiense by disqualification	1998 International Gran Prix first round match
9	El Boricua defeated Mr. Niebla	1998 International Gran Prix first round match
10	Headhunter A defeated Universo 2000	1998 International Gran Prix first round match
11	Máscara Año 2000 defeated Miguel Perez Jr.	1998 International Gran Prix quarter final match
12	Apolo Dantés defeated Emilio Charles Jr.	1998 International Gran Prix quarter final match
13	Rayo de Jalisco Jr. defeated Ricky Santana	1998 International Gran Prix quarter final match
14	Headhunter A defeated El Boricua	1998 International Gran Prix quarter final match
15	Apolo Dantés defeated Máscara Año 2000	1998 International Gran Prix semi-final match
16	Rayo de Jalisco Jr. defeated Headhunter A	1998 International Gran Prix semi-final match
17	Apolo Dantés defeated Rayo de Jalisco Jr.	1998 International Gran Prix final match
