= CMLL International Gran Prix (1997) =

Mexican professional wrestling tournament

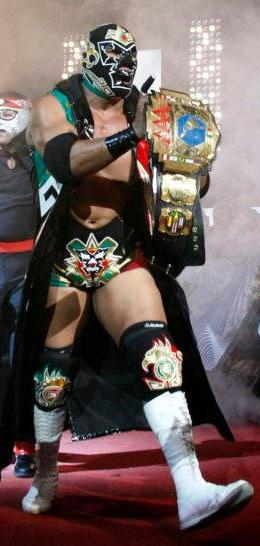
- Dr. Wagner Jr., representing Mexico
- Promotion: Consejo Mundial de Lucha Libre
- Date: April 4, 1997
- City: Mexico City, Mexico
- Venue: Arena México

Event chronology
| ← Previous; Homenaje a Salvador Lutteroth | Next →: 41. Aniversario de Arena México |

International Gran Prix chronology
| ← Previous; 1996 | Next → 1998 |

The CMLL International Gran Prix (1997) was a lucha libre, or professional wrestling, tournament produced and scripted by the Mexican professional wrestling promotion Consejo Mundial de Lucha Libre (CMLL; "World Wrestling Council" in Spanish) which took place on April 4, 1997 in Arena México, Mexico City, Mexico, CMLL's main venue. The 1997 International Gran Prix was the fourth time CMLL has held an International Gran Prix tournament since 1994. All International Gran Prix tournaments have been a one-night tournament, always as part of CMLL's Friday night CMLL Super Viernes shows.

The fourth International Gran Prix was a one night, 16-man single elimination tournament consisting of Mexican natives and a number of foreign wrestlers, some of which worked for CMLL on a regular basis (such as Steele and Último Dragón) and others who were invited specially for the tournament (such as Leatherface). The final match saw Steel defeat Rayo de Jalisco Jr. to win the International Gran Prix.

== Production ==
=== Background ===
In 1994 the Mexican professional wrestling promotion Consejo Mundial de Lucha Libre (CMLL) organized their first ever International Gran Prix tournament. The first tournament followed the standard "single elimination" format and featured sixteen wrestlers in total, eight representing Mexico and eight "international" wrestlers. In the end Mexican Rayo de Jalisco Jr. defeated King Haku in the finals to win the tournament. In 1995 CMLL brought the tournament back, creating an annual tournament held every year from 1995 through 1998 and then again in 2002, 2003 and finally from 2005 through 2008.

=== Storylines ===
The CMLL Gran Prix show featured four professional wrestling matches where wrestlers were matched up specifically for the tournament instead of as a result of pre-existing scripted feuds. The wrestlers themselves portray either faces (técnicos in Mexico, the "good guy" characters) or heels (referred to as rudos in Mexico, those that portray the "bad guys") as they perform for the fans before, during and after the matches.

== Tournament ==
=== Tournament overview ===
| Name | Country | promotion |
|---|---|---|
| Atlantis | Mexico | CMLL |
| Brazo de Plata | Mexico | CMLL |
| Emilio Charles Jr. | Mexico | CMLL |
| Apolo Dantés | Mexico | CMLL |
| Dr. Wagner Jr. | Mexico | CMLL |
| La Fiera | Mexico | CMLL |
| Foreign Exchange | Puerto Rico | Freelancer |
| Leatherface | United States | Freelancer |
| Miguel Pérez Jr. | Puerto Rico | CMLL |
| Rayo de Jalisco Jr. | Mexico | CMLL |
| Shinobi | Japan | CMLL |
| Silver King | Mexico | CMLL |
| Steele | Canada | CMLL |
| Tigre Canadiense | Canada | CMLL |
| Tsubasa | Japan | CMLL |
| Último Dragón | Japan | CMLL |

=== Tournament brackets ===
Round of 16
Steele | W
Atlantis
Último Dragón | W
Tsubasa
Leatherface | W
Tigre Canadiense
Apolo Dantés | W
Brazo de Plata
Rayo de Jalisco Jr. | W
Shinobi
Dr. Wagner Jr. | W
Miguel Pérez Jr.
Emilio Charles Jr. | W
Silver King
La Fiera | W
Foreign Exchange

Quarterfinals
Steele | W
Último Dragón
Leatherface
Apolo Dantés | W
Rayo de Jalisco Jr. | W
Dr. Wagner Jr.
Emilio Charles Jr. | W
La Fiera

Semifinals
Steel | W
Apolo Dantés
Rayo de Jalisco Jr. | W
Emilio Charles Jr.

Finals
Steele
Rayo de Jalisco Jr.

=== Tournament show ===
| No. | Results | Stipulations |
|---|---|---|
| 1 | Máscara Mágica, Mr. Niebla, and Shocker defeated Arkangel de la Muerte, Guerrero de la Muerte, and Violencia | Best two-out-of-three falls six-man tag team match |
| 2 | Steele defeated Atlantis | 1997 International Gran Prix first round match |
| 3 | Último Dragón defeated Tsubasa | 1997 International Gran Prix first round match |
| 4 | Leatherface defeated Tigre Canadiense | 1997 International Gran Prix first round match |
| 5 | Apolo Dantés defeated Brazo de Plata | 1997 International Gran Prix first round match |
| 6 | Rayo de Jalisco Jr. defeated Shinobi | 1997 International Gran Prix first round match |
| 7 | Dr. Wagner Jr. defeated Miguel Pérez Jr. | 1997 International Gran Prix first round match |
| 8 | Emilio Charles Jr. defeated Silver King | 1997 International Gran Prix first round match |
| 9 | La Fiera defeated Foreign Exchange | 1997 International Gran Prix first round match |
| 10 | Steele defeated Último Dragón | 1997 International Gran Prix quarter final match |
| 11 | Apolo Dantés defeated Leatherface | 1997 International Gran Prix quarter final match |
| 12 | Rayo de Jalisco Jr. defeated Dr. Wagner Jr. | 1997 International Gran Prix quarter final match |
| 13 | Emilio Charles Jr. defeated La Fiera | 1997 International Gran Prix quarter final match |
| 14 | Steele defeated Apolo Dantés | 1997 International Gran Prix semi-final match |
| 15 | Rayo de Jalisco Jr. defeated Emilio Charles Jr. | 1997 International Gran Prix semi-final match |
| 16 | Steele defeated Rayo de Jalisco Jr. | 1997 International Gran Prix final match |
