= CMLL International Gran Prix (2007) =

Mexican professional wrestling tournament

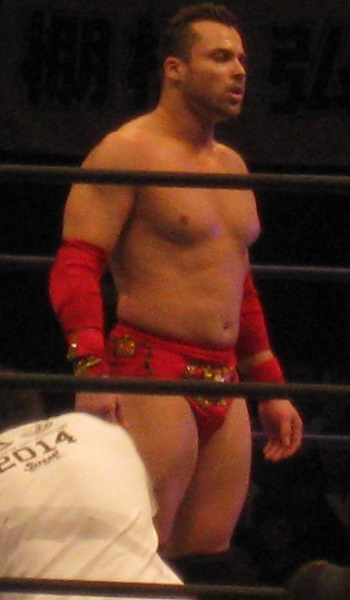
- Alex Koslov, representing the international side
- Promotion: Consejo Mundial de Lucha Libre
- Date: May 11, 2007
- City: Mexico City, Mexico
- Venue: Arena Mexico

Event chronology
← Previous; 51. Aniversario de Arena México	Next → Leyenda de Plata

International Gran Prix chronology
← Previous; 2006	Next → 2008

The CMLL International Gran Prix (2007) was a lucha libre, or professional wrestling, tournament produced and scripted by the Mexican professional wrestling promotion Consejo Mundial de Lucha Libre (CMLL; "World Wrestling Council" in Spanish) which took place on May 11, 2007 in Arena México, Mexico City, Mexico, CMLL's main venue. The 2007 International Gran Prix was the tenth time CMLL has held an International Gran Prix tournament since 1994. All International Gran Prix tournaments have been a one-night tournament, always as part of CMLL's Friday night CMLL Super Viernes shows.

The 16-man torneo cibernetico elimination match between team Mexico (Dr. Wagner Jr., Dos Caras Jr., Atlantis, Lizmark Jr., Último Guerrero, Olímpico, Rey Bucanero and El Sagrado) and Team "International wrestling", four of which worked for CMLL on a regular basis (Shigeo Okumura, Alex Koslov, Marco Corleone and Pierroth) and four wrestlers brought in from Japan specifically for the tournament (Minoru Suzuki, Jushin Thunder Liger, Hirooki Goto, Último Dragón). Pierroth was on "Team International" despite being born in Mexico as his "Ring persona" claims to be from Puerto Rico. The match came down to Último Guerrero and Jushin Thunder Liger as the final two participants and saw Guerrero win to become the first and so far only wrestler to win the Gran Prix back to back years and only the second wrestler to win the Gran Prix more than once.

== Production ==
=== Background ===
In 1994 the Mexican professional wrestling promotion Consejo Mundial de Lucha Libre (CMLL) organized their first ever International Gran Prix tournament. The first tournament followed the standard "single elimination" format and featured sixteen wrestlers in total, eight representing Mexico and eight "international" wrestlers. Some of these international wrestlers were already working for CMLL at the time, such as King Haku and Corazon de León while others came to Mexico specifically for the tournament such as Japanese wrestler Yamato. In the end Mexican Rayo de Jalisco Jr. defeated King Haku in the finals to win the tournament. In 1995 CMLL brought the tournament back, creating an annual tournament held every year from 1995 through 1998 and then again in 2002, 2003 and finally from 2005 through 2008. The first five tournaments from 1994 through 1998 were all standard 16-man tournaments, but when CMLL brought the International Gran Prix tournament back in 2002 it was modified into a Torneo Cibernetico elimination match where an eight-man "Team Mexico" would face off against an eight-man "Team International" until only one team or wrestler survived.

Rayo de Jalisco Jr. won both the inaugural tournament as well as the 1998 International Gran Prix tournament, making him one of only two wrestlers to win the tournament twice. The other repeat winner was Último Guerrero, who won both the 2006 and 2007 International Gran Prixs. Headhunter A (1995) and Steel (1997) were the only "Team International" wrestlers to win a tournament prior to the 2007 International Gran Prix tournament.

=== Storylines ===
The CMLL Gran Prix show featured three professional wrestling matches scripted by CMLL with some wrestlers involved in scripted feuds. The wrestlers portray either heels (referred to as rudos in Mexico, those that play the part of the "bad guys") or faces (técnicos in Mexico, the "good guy" characters) as they perform.

== Tournament ==
Shocker was originally announced as part of "Team Mexico", but on the night of the show he was replaced by El Sagrado without any explanation from CMLL. During the match Alex Koslov and Atlantis ended up eliminating each other as they both had their shoulders down during the pin. The All Japan Pro Wrestling Triple Crown Heavyweight Champion Minoru Suzuki was eliminated from the match by disqualification as his cornerman Yoshihiro Takayama attacked Último Guerrero during the match. In the final sequence of the match Jushin Thunder Liger almost overcame a four-on-one advantage as he eliminated Rey Bucanero, Dr. Wagner Jr. and El Sagrado, but fell to Último Guerrero in the end, giving Team Mexico the victory. With his victory Guerrero became the second man to win the Gran Prix twice as well as the first to do it in back-to-back years.

=== Tournament overview ===
#	Eliminated	By	Team	Time	Ref(s).
1	Pierroth	Olímpico	Team International	12:56	
2	Okumura	Rey Bucanero	Team International	18:25	
3	Lizmark Jr.	Minoru Suzuki	Team Mexico	22:07	
4	Olímpico	Marco Corleone	Team Mexico	22:14	
5	Alex Koslov	Atlantis	Team International	23:12	
5	Atlantis	Alex Koslov	Team Mexico	23:12	
7	Hirooki Goto	El Sagrado	Team International	25:22	
8	Rey Bucanero	Jushin Thunder Liger	Team Mexico	28:30	
9	Minoru Suzuki	Disqualified	Team International	31:59	
10	Último Dragón	Dos Caras Jr.	Team International	33:59	
11	Dos Caras Jr.	Marco Corleone	Team Mexico	34:17	
12	Dr. Wagner Jr.	Jushin Thunder Liger	Team Mexico	34:47	
13	Marco Corleone	Último Guerrero	Team International	39:13	
14	El Sagrado	Jushin Thunder Liger	Team Mexico	41:11	
15	Jushin Thunder Liger	Último Guerrero	Team International	45:02	
16	Último Guerrero (Winner)		Team Mexico	45:02	

=== Tournament show ===
No.	Results	Stipulations	Times
1	Los Nuevo Infernales (Euforia, Nosferatu, and Virus) defeated Brillante, Leono, and Stuka Jr.	Six-man "Lucha Libre rules" tag team match	14:06
2	Black Warrior and La Triada del Terror (Averno and Mephisto) defeated La Dinastia Casas (El Felino, Heavy Metal, and Negro Casas)	Six-man "Lucha Libre rules" tag team match	10:10
3	Último Guerrero defeated Alex Koslov, Atlantis, Dos Caras Jr., Dr. Wagner Jr., El Sagrado, Hirooki Goto, Jushin Thunder Liger, Lizmark Jr., Marco Corleone, Minoru Suzuki, Okumura, Olímpico, Pierroth, Rey Bucanero, and Último Dragón	Gran Prix Torneo Cibernetico 16 Man Elimination Match	45:02
