= CMLL International Gran Prix (1995) =

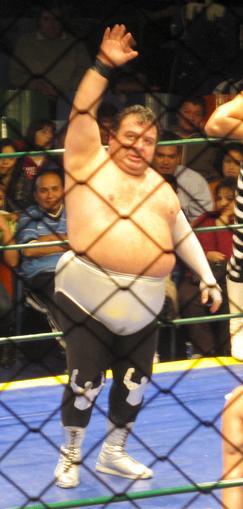
- Brazo de Plata, representing Mexico in the tournament
- Promotion: Consejo Mundial de Lucha Libre
- Date: July 7, 1995
- City: Mexico City, Mexico
- Venue: Arena México

Event chronology
← Previous; Gran Alternativa	Next → Second Generation Tag Team Tournament

International Gran Prix chronology
← Previous; 1994	Next → 1996

The CMLL International Gran Prix (1995) was a lucha libre, or professional wrestling, tournament produced and scripted by the Mexican professional wrestling promotion Consejo Mundial de Lucha Libre (CMLL; "World Wrestling Council" in Spanish) which took place on July 7, 1995 in Arena México, Mexico City, Mexico, CMLL's main venue. The 1995 International Gran Prix was the second time CMLL has held an International Gran Prix tournament since 1994. All International Gran Prix tournaments have been a one-night tournament, always as part of CMLL's Friday night CMLL Super Viernes shows. The second ever International Gran Prix featured a one night, 16-man single elimination tournament consisting of Mexican natives and foreign-born wrestlers, some of which worked for CMLL on a regular basis (such as The Headhunters and El Boriqua) and others who were invited specially for the tournament (such as Johnny Gunn). The final match saw IWA Puerto Rico representative, Headhunter A defeat Canadian CMLL representative Vampiro Canadiense to win the International Gran Prix.

== Production ==
=== Background ===
In 1994 the Mexican professional wrestling promotion Consejo Mundial de Lucha Libre (CMLL) organized their first ever International Gran Prix tournament. The first tournament followed the standard "single elimination" format and featured sixteen wrestlers in total, eight representing Mexico and eight "international" wrestlers. In the end Mexican Rayo de Jalisco Jr. defeated King Haku in the finals to win the tournament. In 1995 CMLL brought the tournament back, creating an annual tournament.

=== Storylines ===
The CMLL Gran Prix show featured fifteen professional wrestling matches scripted by CMLL with some wrestlers involved in scripted feuds. The wrestlers portray either heels (referred to as rudos in Mexico, those that play the part of the "bad guys") or faces (técnicos in Mexico, the "good guy" characters) as they perform.

== Tournament ==
=== Tournament overview ===
Name	Country	Promotion
Atlantis	Mexico	CMLL
El Boriqua	Puerto Rico	CMLL
Brazo de Plata	Mexico	CMLL
Emilio Charles Jr.	Mexico	CMLL
Dos Caras	Mexico	CMLL
La Fiera	Mexico	CMLL
Foreign Exchange	Puerto Rico	CMLL
Johnny Gunn	United States	independent circuit
Headhunter A	Puerto Rico	IWA Puerto Rico
Headhunter B	Puerto Rico	IWA Puerto Rico
Leatherface	United States	IWA Puerto Rico
Miguel Pérez Jr.	Puerto Rico	IWA Puerto Rico
Pierroth Jr.	Puerto Rico	CMLL
Rayo de Jalisco Jr.	Mexico	CMLL
Silver King	Mexico	CMLL
Vampiro Canadiense	Canada	CMLL

=== Tournament brackets ===
Round of 16
Headhunter A	W
Johnny Gunn
Miguel Pérez Jr.	W
Rayo de Jalisco Jr.
Emilio Charles Jr.	W
Brazo de Plata
Headhunter B
Atlantis	W
Silver King	W
Foreign Exchange
Pierroth Jr.
Dos Caras	W
La Fiera
El Boriqua	W
Leatherface
Vampiro Canadiense	W

Quarterfinals
Headhunter A	W
Miguel Pérez Jr.
Emilio Charles Jr.
Atlantis	W
Silver King
Dos Caras	W
El Boriqua
Vampiro	W

Semifinals
Headhunter A	W
Atlantis
Dos Caras
Vampiro	W

Finals
Headhunter A
Vampiro

== Tournament show ==
No.	Results	Stipulations
1	Headhunter A defeated Johnny Gunn	1995 International Gran Prix first round match
2	Miguel Pérez Jr. defeated Rayo de Jalisco Jr.	1995 International Gran Prix first round match
3	Emilio Charles Jr. defeated Brazo de Plata	1995 International Gran Prix first round match
4	Atlantis defeated Headhunter B	1995 International Gran Prix first round match
5	Silver King defeated Foreign Exchange	1995 International Gran Prix first round match
6	Dos Caras defeated Pierroth Jr.	1995 International Gran Prix first round match
7	El Boriqua defeated La Fiera	1995 International Gran Prix first round match
8	Vampiro Canadiense defeated Leatherface	1995 International Gran Prix first round match
9	Headhunter A defeated Miguel Pérez Jr.	1995 International Gran Prix quarter final match
10	Atlantis defeated Emilio Charles Jr.	1995 International Gran Prix quarter final match
11	Dos Caras defeated Silver King	1995 International Gran Prix quarter final match
12	Vampiro Canadiense defeated El Boricua	1995 International Gran Prix quarter final match
13	Headhunter A defeated Atlantis	1995 International Gran Prix semi-final match
14	Vampiro Canadiense defeated Dos Caras	1995 International Gran Prix semi-final match
15	Headhunter A defeated Vampiro Canadiense	1995 International Gran Prix final match
