= List of CMLL singles wrestling tournaments =

Consejo Mundial de Lucha Libre tournaments

The Mexican professional wrestling promotion Consejo Mundial de Lucha Libre (CMLL) has held a number of Professional wrestling tournaments for singles wrestlers since the creation of the company in 1937. Some tournaments are recurring and others were a one-off tournament held for a special event. Being professional wrestling tournaments, it they are not won legitimately; they are instead won via predetermined outcomes to the matches that is kept secret from the general public. Below is a list of various infrequent or one-off tournaments held by CMLL over the years.

== Salvador Lutteroth Singles Tournament (1998) ==
On March 20, 1998 CMLL held a one night, single elimination tournament on their annual Homenaje a Salvador Lutteroth show in honor of Salvador Lutteroth, the founder of CMLL. The tournament gathered eight of the top competitors in the promotion at the time including the then reigning CMLL World Heavyweight Champion Universo 2000. The tournament saw Mr. Niebla defeat Universo 2000, Atlantis and Black Warrior to win the tournament. The victory was quickly overshadowed by the actions that took place after the match was over. Universo 2000 ran to the ring and attacked both Mr. Niebla as well as Rayo de Jalisco, Sr. who was in the ring to present the trophy to Mr. Niebla. Moments later Rayo de Jalisco, Jr. came to the ring to help his father, but was attacked by Steel, making a surprise appearance, who attacked Rayo, Jr. pulled Rayo, Jr.'s mask off and then proceeded to light it on fire after he hung it on the ringpost.

=== Tournament bracket ===
Quarter finals
Black Warrior	W
El Felino
Último Dragón	W
Karloff Lagarde, Jr.
Mr. Niebla	W
Universo 2000
Atlantis	W
Shocker

Semi finals
Black Warrior	W
Último Dragón
Mr. Niebla	W
Atlantis

Final
Black Warrior
Mr. Niebla	W

== Torneo Bicentenario ==
Torneo Bicentenario
- Promotion: Consejo Mundial de Lucha Libre
- Date: July 7, 2010 to July 17, 2010
- City: Mexico City, Mexico
- Venue: Arena Mexico

Event chronology
← Previous; Promociones Gutiérrez 1st Anniversary Show	Next → Infierno en el Ring (2010)

As part of CMLL's bicentennial celebrations, celebrating the 200th anniversary of Mexico's independence CMLL held two Torneo Bicentenario tournament in September 2010, one for the Mini-Estrella division and one focusing on the male division. Unlike the Mini-Estrellas tournament the male division Torneo Bicentenario did not have a prize beyond a trophy. The tournament included 32 wrestlers in total, with two qualifying blocks to find the finalists. The first part of the tournament was divide into a rudo (wrestlers portraying a "bad guy" character) and a tecnico block. Each block started off with an 8 team tag team tournament, after which the winning team would have to wrestle each other to find one finalist. The rudo block took place on September 7, 2010. The teams for the night were: Averno and Mephisto, Dragón Rojo Jr. and Sangre Azteca, Atlantis and Último Guerrero, Héctor Garza and Mr. Águila, Mr. Niebla and Volador Jr., Jushin Thunder Liger and Shigeo Okumura, El Terrible and El Texano, Jr., El Felino and Rey Bucanero. Volador Jr. and Mr. Niebla won the tag team portion of the match, with Volador Jr. defeating his tag team partner to earn a spot in the finals. The tecnico block took place on September 10, 2012 during the weekly Super Viernes show. The randomly paired teams for the night were: Blue Panther and Máscara Dorada, Hijo del Fantasma and Stuka Jr., La Sombra and Místico, Sagrado and Toscano, Brazo de Plata and Maximo, Rayo de Jalisco, Jr. and Valiente, Rush and Jon Strongman and finally La Mascara and Shocker. The tag team final was won by La Sombra and Místico over La Mascara and Shocker. Immediately following the tag team match the winners faced off with Místico pinning his opponent to secure a spot in the finale. The final match took place a week later, on the September 17 Super Viernes show and was the only best two-out-of-three falls match of the entire tournament. The match was another chapter in the storyline feud between Místico and Volador Jr. that had started in January 2010 and saw Volador Jr. overcome his opponent to take La Copa Bicentenario.

=== Rudo bracket ===
Quarter finals
Averno and Mephisto	W
Dragón Rojo Jr. and Sangre Azteca
Atlantis and Último Guerrero	W
Héctor Garza and Mr. Águila
Mr. Niebla and Volador Jr.	W
Jushin Thunder Liger and Shigeo Okumura
El Terrible and El Texano, Jr.	W
El Felino and Rey Bucanero	W

Semi finals
Averno and Mephisto	W
Atlantis and Último Guerrero
Mr. Niebla and Volador Jr.	W
El Terrible and El Texano, Jr.

Final
Averno and Mephisto
Mr. Niebla and Volador Jr.	W

=== Tecnico bracket ===
Quarterfinals
1	Blue Panther and Máscara Dorada	W
8	Hijo del Fantasma and Stuka Jr.
4	La Sombra and Místico	W
5	Sagrado and Toscano
2	Brazo de Plata and Maximo	W
7	Rayo de Jalisco, Jr. and Valiente
3	Rush and Jon Strongman
6	La Mascara and Shocker	W

Semifinals
Blue Panther and Máscara Dorada
La Sombra and Místico	W
Brazo de Plata and Maximo
La Mascara and Shocker	W

Finals
La Sombra and Místico	W
La Mascara and Shocker

== See also ==
- List of CMLL Mini-Estrellas tournaments
- List of CMLL tag team tournaments
