= CMLL International Gran Prix =

List of Mexican Professional wrestling tournaments

International Gran Prix
- Promotion: Consejo Mundial de Lucha Libre

Men's tournament
- Established: April 15, 1994; 32 years ago
- Current winner: (Mexico) Hechicero
- Last completed: 2026
- Editions: 21
- Format: Torneo cibernetico
Statistics
- First winner: (Mexico) Rayo de Jalisco Jr.
- Most wins: (Mexico) Volador Jr. (3 wins)
- Oldest winner: (Switzerland) Claudio Castagnoli (43 years, 240 days)
- Youngest winner: (United States) Alex Shelley (25 years, 64 days)
- Heaviest winner: (Puerto Rico) Headhunter A (148 kg (326 lb))
- Lightest winner: (Mexico) Silueta (wrestler) (57 kg (126 lb))

Women's tournament
- Established: October 22, 2022; 4 years ago
- Current winner: (United States) Persephone
- Last completed: 2025
- Editions: 4
- Format: Torneo cibernetico
Statistics
- First winner: (Panama) Dalys la Caribena
- Oldest winner: (Panama) Dalys la Caribeña (47 years, 244 days)
- Youngest winner: (United States) Persephone (24 years, 82 days)

The International Gran Prix, sometimes written as International Grand Prix, is an annual tournament held by the Mexican professional wrestling promotion Consejo Mundial de Lucha Libre (CMLL), that was held from 1994 to 2008, although there was no tournament in 1999, 2000, 2001 and 2004. The tournament was revived in 2016, being held annually since then (with the exception of 2020 due to the COVID-19 pandemic), with the most recent edition being held in 2026. In 2022, a separate women's tournament was established and has been held annually alongside the men's tournament. The tournament was inspired by New Japan Pro-Wrestling's International Wrestling Grand Prix tournament in the 1980s.

From 1994 until 1998 the Gran Prix was a single elimination tournament that featured a mixture of Mexican and international wrestlers, some who worked for CMLL regularly and some that were invited specifically for the tournament. From 2002 and on the format was changed to a torneo cibernetico, a 16–20-man match with one side representing Mexico and the other side being composed of international wrestlers.

Volador Jr. has won the Gran Prix the most number of times, winning it for a record third time in 2022.

== Tournament winners ==
| Year | Winner | Reign | Date | Note |
|---|---|---|---|---|
| 1994 | Rayo de Jalisco Jr. | 1 | April 15, 1994 | |
| 1995 | Headhunter A | 1 | July 7, 1995 | |
| 1996 | Hijo del Santo | 1 | July 5, 1996 | |
| 1997 | Steel | 1 | April 4, 1997 | |
| 1998 | Apolo Dantés | 1 | August 14, 1998 | |
| 2002 | Máscara Mágica | 1 | March 22, 2002 | |
| 2003 | Dr. Wagner Jr. | 1 | May 5, 2003 | |
| 2005 | Atlantis | 1 | September 23, 2005 | |
| 2006 | Último Guerrero | 1 | May 12, 2006 | |
| 2007 | Último Guerrero | 2 | May 11, 2007 | |
| 2008 | Alex Shelley | 1 | July 26, 2008 | |
| 2016 | Volador Jr. | 1 | July 1, 2016 | |
| 2017 | Diamante Azul | 1 | September 1, 2017 | |
| 2018 | Michael Elgin | 1 | October 5, 2018 | |
| 2019 | Volador Jr. | 2 | August 30, 2019 | |
| 2021 | Dark Silueta | 1 | October 8, 2021 | |
| 2022 Men's | Volador Jr. | 3 | August 19, 2022 | |
| 2022 Women's | Dalys la Caribena | 1 | October 22, 2022 | |
| 2023 Men's | Místico | 1 | August 18, 2023 | |
| 2023 Women's | Tessa Blanchard | 1 | October 27, 2023 | |
| 2024 Men's | Claudio Castagnoli | 1 | August 23, 2024 | |
| 2024 Women's | Reyna Isis | 1 | October 25, 2024 | |
| 2025 Men's | Místico | 2 | August 29, 2025 | |
| 2025 Women's | Persephone | 1 | October 24, 2025 | |
| 2026 Men's | Hechicero | 1 | August 7, 2026 | |
| 2026 Women's | Skadi | 1 | October 23, 2026 | |
