= CMLL International Gran Prix (1996) =

Mexican professional wrestling tournament

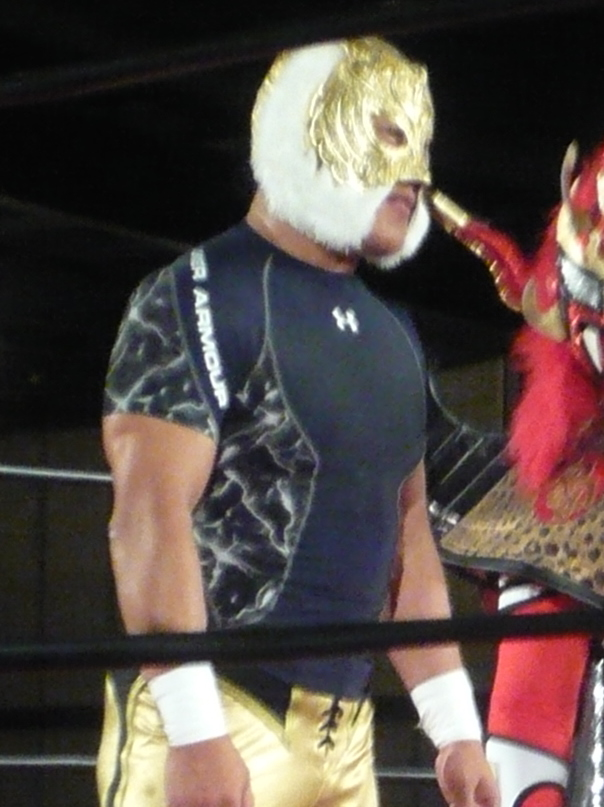
- Tiger Mask IV, travelled to Mexico for the tournament
- Promotion: Consejo Mundial de Lucha Libre
- Date: July 5, 1996
- City: Mexico City, Mexico
- Venue: Arena México

Event chronology
| ← Previous; Gran Alternativa | Next → CMLL 63rd Anniversary Show |

International Gran Prix chronology
| ← Previous; 1995 | Next → 1997 |

The CMLL International Gran Prix (1996) was a lucha libre, or professional wrestling, tournament produced and scripted by the Mexican professional wrestling promotion Consejo Mundial de Lucha Libre (CMLL; "World Wrestling Council" in Spanish) which took place on July 5, 1996, in Arena México, Mexico City, Mexico, CMLL's main venue. The 1996 International Gran Prix was the third time CMLL has held an International Gran Prix tournament since 1994. All International Gran Prix tournaments have been a one-night tournament, always as part of CMLL's Friday night CMLL Super Viernes shows.

The third International Gran Prix followed the format of the first two Gran Prix tournaments by featuring a one night, 16-man single elimination tournament consisting of Mexican natives and foreign-born wrestlers, some of which worked for CMLL on a regular basis and others who were invited specially for the tournament (such as Tiger Mask IV). The final match saw El Hijo del Santo defeat The Great Sasuke from Michinoku Pro to win the International Gran Prix.

== Production ==
=== Background ===
In 1994 the Mexican professional wrestling promotion Consejo Mundial de Lucha Libre (CMLL) organized their first ever International Gran Prix tournament. The first tournament followed the standard "single elimination" format and featured sixteen wrestlers in total, eight representing Mexico and eight "international" wrestlers. In the end Mexican Rayo de Jalisco Jr. defeated King Haku in the finals to win the tournament. In 1995 CMLL brought the tournament back, creating an annual tournament held every year from 1995 through 1998 and then again in 2002, 2003 and finally from 2005 through 2008.

=== Storylines ===
The CMLL Gran Prix show featured fifteen professional wrestling matches scripted by CMLL with some wrestlers involved in scripted feuds. The wrestlers portray either heels (referred to as rudos in Mexico, those that play the part of the "bad guys") or faces (técnicos in Mexico, the "good guy" characters) as they perform.

== Tournament ==
=== Tournament overview ===
| Name | Country | promotion |
|---|---|---|
| Astro Rey Jr. | Mexico | CMLL |
| Bestia Salvaje | Mexico | CMLL |
| Black Warrior | Mexico | CMLL |
| El Bronco | Mexico | CMLL |
| Negro Casas | Mexico | CMLL |
| El Dandy | Mexico | CMLL |
| El Felino | Mexico | CMLL |
| Yone Genjin | Japan | Michinoku Pro |
| Guerrera de la Muerte | Mexico | CMLL |
| The Great Sasuke | Japan | Michinoku Pro |
| El Hijo del Santo | Mexico | CMLL |
| Máscara Mágica | Mexico | CMLL |
| Mr. Niebla | Mexico | CMLL |
| Rey Bucanero | Mexico | CMLL |
| Shocker | Mexico | CMLL |
| Tiger Mask IV | Japan | Michinoku Pro |

=== Tournament brackets ===
Round of 16
El Hijo del Santo | W
Negro Casas
Guerrera de la Muerte | W
El Bronco
Astro Rey Jr.
El Dandy | W
Máscara Mágica | W
Mr. Niebla
Shocker | W
Black Warrior
El Felino | W
Tiger Mask IV
Bestia Salvaje | W
Yone Genjin
Rey Bucanero
The Great Sasuke | W

Quarterfinals
El Hijo del Santo | W
Guerrera de la Muerte
El Dandy
Máscara Mágica | W
Shocker
El Felino | W
Bestia Salvaje
The Great Sasuke | W

Semifinals
El Hijo del Santo | W
Máscara Mágica
El Felino
The Great Sasuke | W

Finals
El Hijo del Santo
The Great Sasuke

=== Tournament show ===
| No. | Results | Stipulations |
|---|---|---|
| 1 | El Felino defeated Tiger Mask | 1996 International Gran Prix first round match |
| 2 | Shocker defeated Black Warrior | 1996 International Gran Prix first round match |
| 3 | Bestia Salvaje defeated Yone Genjin | 1996 International Gran Prix first round match |
| 4 | The Great Sasuke defeated Rey Bucanero | 1996 International Gran Prix first round match |
| 5 | Máscara Mágica defeated Mr. Niebla | 1996 International Gran Prix first round match |
| 6 | El Dandy defeated Astro Rey Jr. | 1996 International Gran Prix first round match |
| 7 | El Hijo del Santo defeated Negro Casas | 1996 International Gran Prix first round match |
| 8 | Guerrero de la Muerte defeated El Bronco | 1996 International Gran Prix first round match |
| 9 | El Felino defeated Shocker | 1996 International Gran Prix quarter final match |
| 10 | The Great Sasuke defeated Bestia Salvaje | 1996 International Gran Prix quarter final match |
| 11 | Mascara Magica defeated El Dandy | 1996 International Gran Prix quarter final match |
| 12 | El Hijo del Santo defeated Guerrero de la Muerte | 1996 International Gran Prix quarter final match |
| 13 | The Great Sasuke defeated El Felino | 1996 International Gran Prix semi-final match |
| 14 | El Hijo del Santo defeated Mascara Magica | 1996 International Gran Prix semi-final match |
| 15 | El Hijo del Santo defeated The Great Sasuke | 1996 International Gran Prix final match |
