= CMLL International Gran Prix (2005) =

Mexican professional wrestling tournament

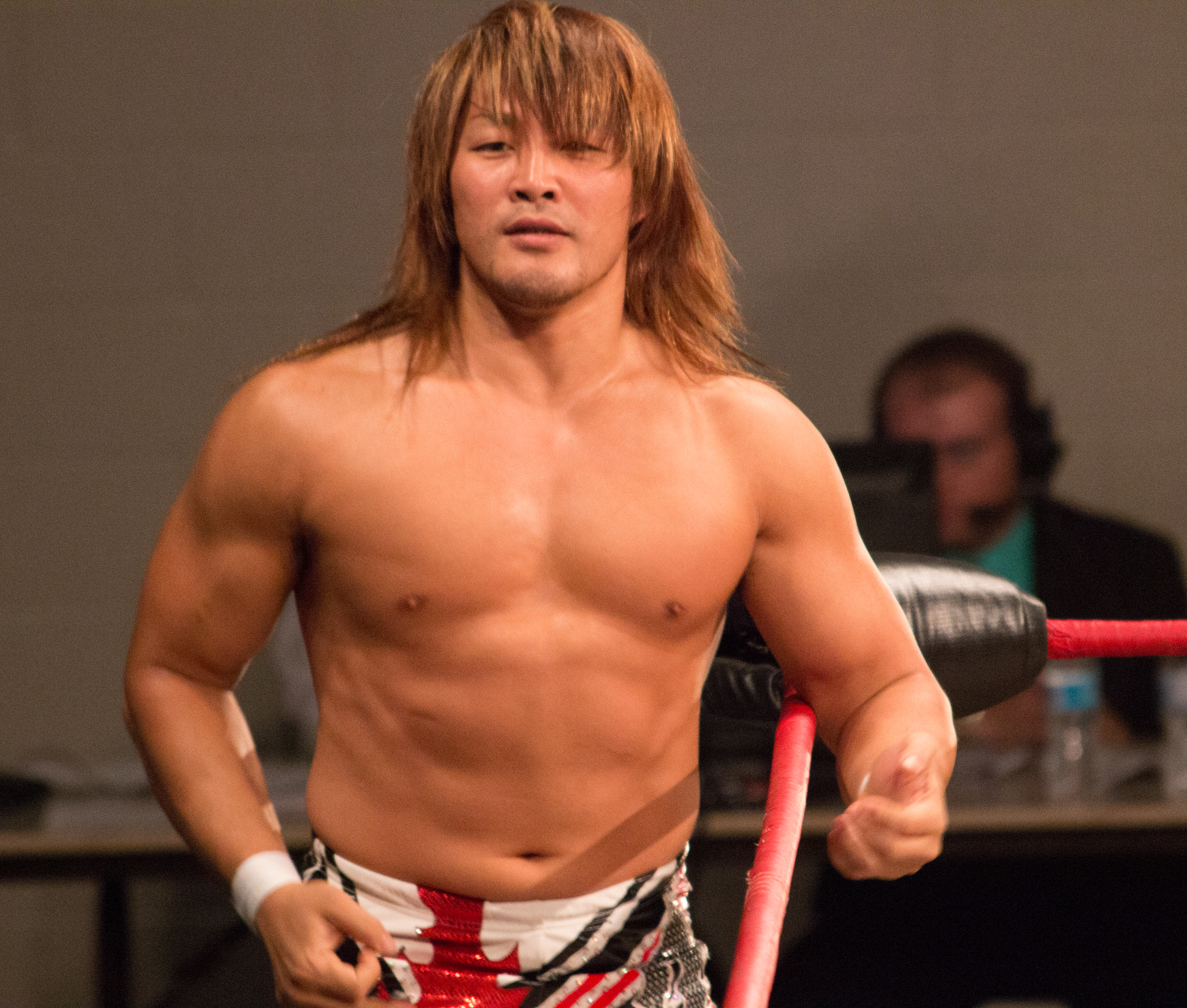
- Hiroshi Tanahashi, representing Japan
- Promotion: Consejo Mundial de Lucha Libre
- Date: September 23, 2005
- City: Mexico City, Mexico
- Venue: Arena México

Event chronology
← Previous; CMLL 72nd Anniversary Show	Next → Leyenda de Plata

International Gran Prix chronology
← Previous; 2003	Next → 2006

The CMLL International Gran Prix (2005) was a lucha libre, or professional wrestling, tournament produced and scripted by the Mexican professional wrestling promotion Consejo Mundial de Lucha Libre (CMLL; "World Wrestling Council" in Spanish) which took place on September 23, 2005 in Arena México, Mexico City, Mexico, CMLL's main venue. The 2005 International Gran Prix was the eight time CMLL has held an International Gran Prix tournament since 1994. All International Gran Prix tournaments have been a one-night tournament, always as part of CMLL's Friday night CMLL Super Viernes shows.

The eight International Gran Prix tournament featured as 16-man Tornero Cibernetico with two teams of mixed Mexican and International wrestlers. The team division for the 2005 International Gran Prix is undocumented and thus uncertain, all that is certain is that the following wrestlers participated: Bronco, Último Dragón, Hijo del Santo, Rey Bucanero, Universo 2000, Olimpico, Tarzan Boy, Pierroth Hiroshi Tanahashi, Shinsuke Nakamura, Averno, Dr. Wagner Jr., Atlantis, Negro Casas, Perro Aguayo Jr. and Lizmark Jr. The international aspects were mainly provided by Tanahashi and Nakamura, on a Mexican tour from New Japan Pro-Wrestling (NJPW) at the time. The match came down to Atlantis and Perro Aguayo Jr. who were on the same team, in the end Atlantis pinned Perro Aguayo Jr. to win the Gran Prix.

== Production ==
=== Background ===
In 1994 the Mexican professional wrestling promotion Consejo Mundial de Lucha Libre (CMLL) organized their first ever International Gran Prix tournament. The first tournament followed the standard "single elimination" format and featured sixteen wrestlers in total, eight representing Mexico and eight "international" wrestlers. In the end Mexican Rayo de Jalisco Jr. defeated King Haku in the finals to win the tournament. In 1995 CMLL brought the tournament back, creating an annual tournament held every year from 1995 through 1998 and then again in 2002, 2003 and finally from 2005 through 2008.

=== Storylines ===
The CMLL Gran Prix show featured three professional wrestling matches scripted by CMLL with some wrestlers involved in scripted feuds. The wrestlers portray either heels (referred to as rudos in Mexico, those that play the part of the "bad guys") or faces (técnicos in Mexico, the "good guy" characters) as they perform.

== Tournament ==
=== Tournament overview ===
#	Eliminated	By
1	Bronco	Hiroshi Tanahashi
2	Olímpico	Lizmark Jr.
3	Averno	Disqualified for removing Hijo del Santo's Mask
4	Último Dragón	Shinsuke Nakamura
5	Pierroth	Dr. Wagner. Jr.
6	Negro Casas	Perro Aguayo Jr.
7	Tarzan Boy	Atlantis
8	El Hijo del Santo	Shinsuke Nakamura
9	Shinsuke Nakamura	Rey Bucanero and Universo 2000
10	Hiroshi Tanahashi	Rey Bucanero and Universo 2000
11	Dr. Wagner Jr.	Rey Bucanero
12	Lizmark Jr.	Perro Aguayo Jr.
13	Universo 2000	Perro Aguayo Jr.
14	Rey Bucanero	Atlantis
15	Perro Aguayo Jr.	Atlantis
16	Atlantis (Winner)	

=== Tournament show ===
No.	Results	Stipulations
1	Leono, Tigre Blanco, and Tigre Metálico defeated Los Romanos (Caligula and Messala) and Ramstein	Best two-out-of-three falls six-man tag team match
2	El Sagrado, Texano Jr., and Máximo defeated Pandilla Guerrera (Dr. X, Nitro, and Sangre Azteca)	Best two-out-of-three falls six-man tag team match
3	Atlantis defeated Averno, Dr. Wagner Jr., El Bronco, El Hijo del Santo, Hiroshi Tanahashi, Lizmark Jr., Negro Casas, Olímpico, Perro Aguayo Jr., Pierroth Jr., Rey Bucanero, Shinsuke Nakamura, Tarzan Boy, Último Dragón, and Universo 2000	2005 International Gran Prix 16-man torneo cibernetico elimination match
4	Místico defeated Último Guerrero by disqualification	Best two-out-of-three falls match
