= CMLL International Gran Prix (2002) =

Mexican professional wrestling tournament

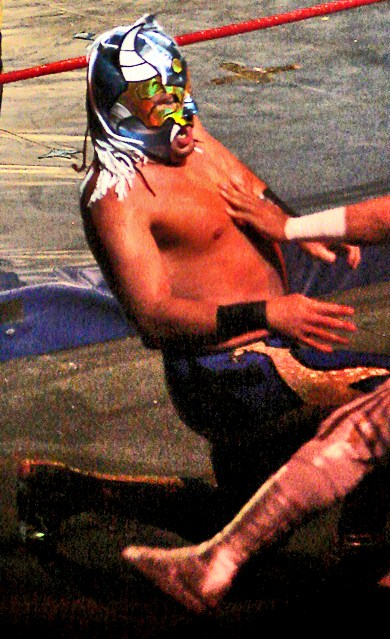
- Averno, first time participant in 2002
- Promotion: Consejo Mundial de Lucha Libre
- Date: March 22, 2002
- City: Mexico City, Mexico
- Venue: Arena México

Event chronology
← Previous; Homenaje a Dos Leyendas	Next →: 46. Aniversario de Arena México

International Gran Prix chronology
← Previous; 1998	Next → 2003

The CMLL International Gran Prix (2002) was a lucha libre, or professional wrestling, tournament produced and scripted by the Mexican professional wrestling promotion Consejo Mundial de Lucha Libre (CMLL; "World Wrestling Council" in Spanish) which took place on March 22, 2002, in Arena México, Mexico City, Mexico, CMLL's main venue. The 2002 International Gran Prix was the sixth time CMLL has held an International Gran Prix tournament since 1994 and the first since 1998. All International Gran Prix tournaments have been a one-night tournament, always as part of CMLL's Friday night CMLL Super Viernes shows.

The sixth International Gran Prix tournament was the first time that CMLL changed the format from an elimination tournament to a 16-man Tornero Cibernetico instead. This was the first time the tournament was held since 1998 and every Gran Prix since then has had the same Tornero Cibernetico format. The teams were mixed Tecnicos and Rudos, seemingly randomly teamed up without any pre-existing storyline behind it. The teams were; "Team A" (Zumbido, Safari, Hombre Sin Nombre, Halloween, Volador Jr., Damián 666, Negro Casas and El Hijo del Santo) against "Team B (El Felino, Olímpico, Tony Rivera, Máscara Mágica, Nicho El Millonario, Satánico, Averno and Mephisto). The tournament came down to Máscara Mágica and El Hijo del Santo, with Máscara Magica winning the match. While the tournament was billed as the "International Gran Prix" it only featured Mexican born wrestlers who worked for CMLL at the time.

== Production ==
=== Background ===
In 1994 the Mexican professional wrestling promotion Consejo Mundial de Lucha Libre (CMLL) organized their first ever International Gran Prix tournament. The first tournament followed the standard "single elimination" format and featured sixteen wrestlers in total, eight representing Mexico and eight "international" wrestlers. In the end Mexican Rayo de Jalisco Jr. defeated King Haku in the finals to win the tournament. In 1995 CMLL brought the tournament back, creating an annual tournament held every year from 1995 through 1998 and then again in 2002, 2003 and finally from 2005 through 2008. First time as a cibernetico

=== Storylines ===
The CMLL Gran Prix show featured three professional wrestling matches scripted by CMLL with some wrestlers involved in scripted feuds. The wrestlers portray either heels (referred to as rudos in Mexico, those that play the part of the "bad guys") or faces (técnicos in Mexico, the "good guy" characters) as they perform.

== Tournament ==
=== Tournament overview ===
#	Eliminated	By	Team	Time
1	Tony Rivera	Halloween	Team B	1:14
2	Volador Jr.	Nicho el Millonario	Team A	4:40
3	Mephisto	Damián 666	Team B	7:13
4	Damián 666	El Felino	Team A	7:40
5	El Felino	Averno and Satánico	Team B	9:12
6	Averno	Negro Casas	Team B	10:01
7	Nicho el Millonario	El Hijo del Santo	Team B	11:11
8	Halloween	Olímpico	Team A	12:21
9	Safari	Máscara Mágica	Team A	13:37
10	Zumbido	Satánico	Team A	14:48
11	Olímpico	Hombre sin Nombre	Team B	15:53
12	Hombre Sin Nombre	Máscara Mágica	Team A	16:56
13	Satánico	El Hijo del Santo	Team B	17:51
14	Negro Casas	Disqualified for interfering	Team A	18:45
15	El Hjio del Santo	Máscara Mágica	Team A	20:19
16	Máscara Magica (Winner)		Team B	20:19

=== Tournament show ===
No.	Results	Stipulations
1	Olimpus and Sicodelico Jr. defeated Mogur and Ramstein	Best two-out-of-three falls tag team match
2	Máscara Mágica defeated Averno, Damián 666, El Hijo del Santo, El Hombre Sin Nombre, El Satánico, El Felino, Halloween, Mephisto, Negro Casas, Nicho el Millonario, Olímpico, Safari, Tony Rivera, Volador Jr., and Zumbido	2002 International Gran Prix 16-man torneo cibernetico elimination match
3	Blue Panther, Dr. Wagner Jr., and Fuerza Guerrera (c) defeated Los Guerreros del Infierno (Rey Bucanero, Tarzan Boy and Último Guerrero)	Best two-out-of-three falls six-man tag team match for the CMLL World Trios Championship
(c) / – the champion(s) heading into the match
