= CMLL International Gran Prix (2006) =

Mexican professional wrestling tournament

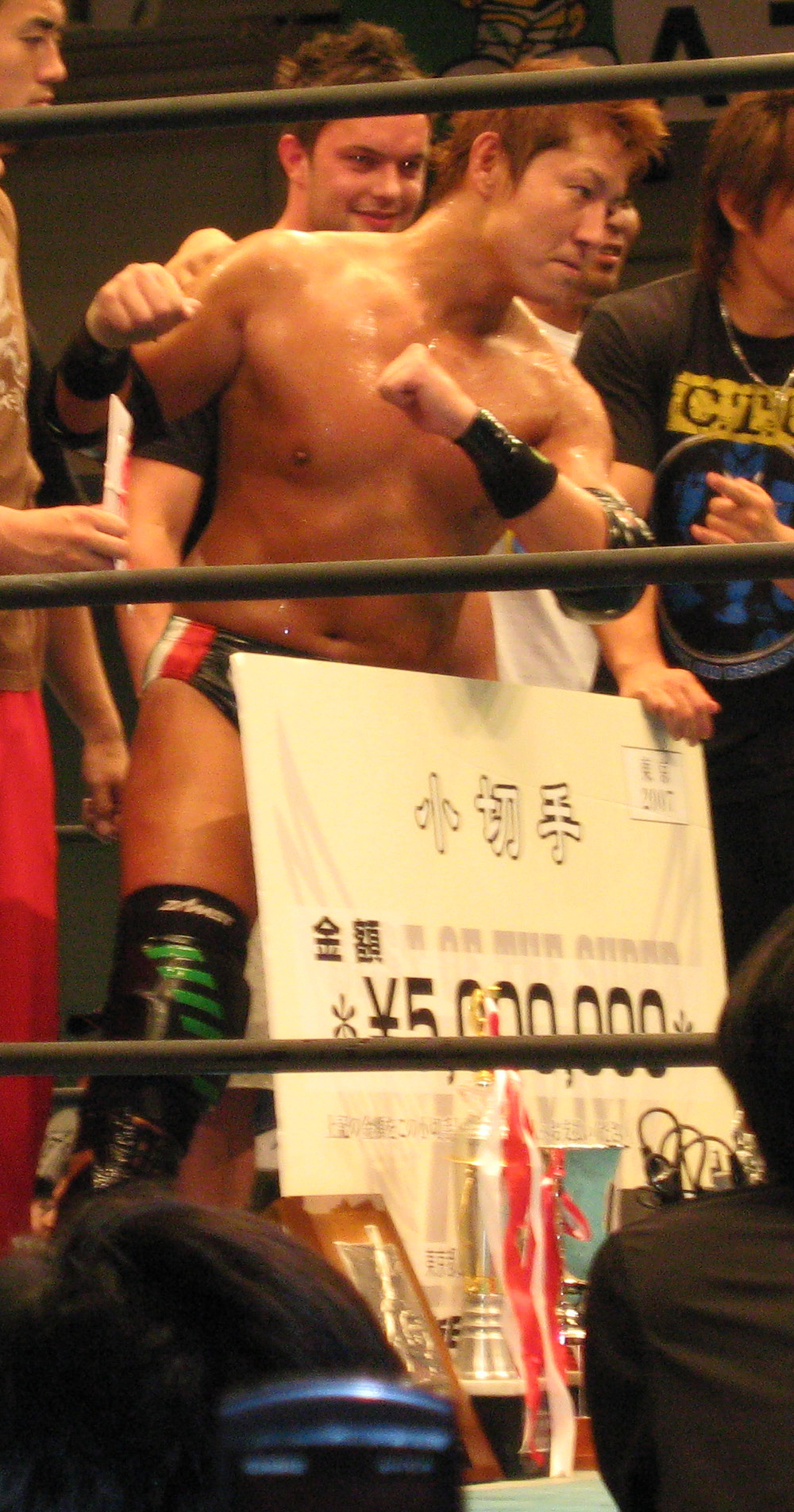
- Milano Collection A.T., in Mexico for a short visit
- Promotion: Consejo Mundial de Lucha Libre
- Date: May 12, 2006
- City: Mexico City, Mexico
- Venue: Arena México

Event chronology
← Previous; 50. Aniversario de Arena México	Next → Torneo Gran Alternativa

International Gran Prix chronology
← Previous; 2005	Next → 2007

The CMLL International Gran Prix (2006) was a lucha libre, or professional wrestling, tournament produced and scripted by the Mexican professional wrestling promotion Consejo Mundial de Lucha Libre (CMLL; "World Wrestling Council" in Spanish) which took place on May 12, 2006 in Arena México, Mexico City, Mexico, CMLL's main venue. The 2006 International Gran Prix was the ninth time CMLL has held an International Gran Prix tournament since 1994. All International Gran Prix tournaments have been a one-night tournament, always as part of CMLL's Friday night CMLL Super Viernes shows.

The ninth International Gran Prix tournament featured a 16-man torneo cibernetico elimination match between a team representing Mexico (L.A. Park, Dos Caras Jr., Dr. Wagner Jr., Heavy Metal, Mr. Niebla, Héctor Garza, Olímpico and Último Guerrero) facing a team of "International" wrestlers, some who worked for CMLL at the time (Marco Corleone, Shigeo Okumura and Pierroth, a Japanese wrestlers who worked mainly in Mexico at the time (Hajime Ohara and Masada) and as well as three foreign born wrestlers that did not generally work in Mexico at the time (Katsushi Takemura, Milano Collection AT and Johnny Stamboli). The match came down to Último Guerrero and Johnny Stambol as the final two participants and saw Guerrero win the Gran Prix.

== Production ==
=== Background ===
In 1994 the Mexican professional wrestling promotion Consejo Mundial de Lucha Libre (CMLL) organized their first ever International Gran Prix tournament. The first tournament followed the standard "single elimination" format and featured sixteen wrestlers in total, eight representing Mexico and eight "international" wrestlers. In the end Mexican Rayo de Jalisco Jr. defeated King Haku in the finals to win the tournament. In 1995 CMLL brought the tournament back, creating an annual tournament held every year from 1995 through 1998 and then again in 2002, 2003 and finally from 2005 through 2008.

=== Storylines ===
The CMLL Gran Prix show featured four professional wrestling matches scripted by CMLL with some wrestlers involved in scripted feuds. The wrestlers portray either heels (referred to as rudos in Mexico, those that play the part of the "bad guys") or faces (técnicos in Mexico, the "good guy" characters) as they perform.

== Tournament ==
=== Tournament overview ===
#	Eliminated	By	Team
1	Hajime Ohara	Heavy Metal	Team International
2	MAZADA	Olímpico	Team International
3	Mr. Niebla	Katsushi Takemura	Team Mexico
4	Heavy Metal	Johnny Stamboli	Team Mexico
5	Milano Collection AT	Héctor Garza	Team International
6	Héctor Garza	Katsushi Takemura	Team Mexico
7	Olímpico	Johnny Stamboli	Team Mexico
8	Dr. Wagner Jr.	Pierroth Jr.	Team Mexico
9	L.A. Park	Okumura and Katsushi Takemura	Team Mexico
10	Marco Corelone	Dos Caras Jr.	Team International
11	Pierroth Jr.	Dos Caras Jr.	Team International
12	Okumura	Último Guerrero	Team International
13	Dos Caras Jr.	Katsushi Takemura (Double elimination)	Team Mexico
14	Katsushi Takemura	Dos Caras Jr. (Double elimination)	Team International
15	Johnny Stamboli	Último Guerrero	Team International
16	Último Guerrero (Winner)		Team Mexico

=== Tournament show ===
No.	Results	Stipulations
1	Marcela, Mima Shimoda, and Sahori defeated Hiroka, La Amapola, and Princesa Sujei	Best two-out-of-three tag team falls match
2	Último Guerrero defeated Dos Caras Jr., Dr. Wagner Jr., Hajime Ohara, Heavy Metal, Héctor Garza, Johnny Stamboli, Katsushi Takemura, L.A. Park, Mark Jindrak, MAZADA, Milano Collection AT, Mr. Niebla, Okumura, Olímpico, and Pierroth Jr.	2006 International Gran Prix 16-man torneo cibernetico elimination match
3	The Great Muta and Último Dragón defeated Los Guerreros del Atlantida (Atlantis and Rey Bucanero)	Best two-out-of-three tag team falls match
4	Black Warrior defeated Místico (c)	Best two-out-of-three falls match for the NWA World Middleweight Championship
(c) / – the champion(s) heading into the match
