= Homenaje a Salvador Lutteroth (1997) =

Mexican Professional wrestling show

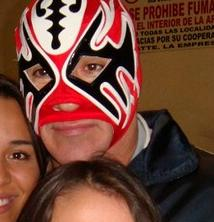
- Atlantis, who teamed up with Lizmark and Rayo de Jalisco Jr. for the tournament.
- Promotion: Consejo Mundial de Lucha Libre
- Date: March 21, 1997
- City: Mexico City, Mexico
- Venue: Arena México

Event chronology
← Previous; Juicio Final	Next → International Gran Prix

Homenaje a Dos Leyendas chronology
← Previous; 1996	Next → 1998

Homenaje a Salvador Lutteroth (1997) (Spanish for "Homage to Salvador Lutteroth") was a professional wrestling supercard show event, scripted and produced by Consejo Mundial de Lucha Libre (CMLL; "World Wrestling Council"). The Homenaje show took place on March 21, 1997 in CMLL's main venue, Arena México, Mexico City, Mexico. The event was to honor and remember CMLL founder Salvador Lutteroth, who died in March 1987. The annual March event would later be renamed Homenaje a Dos Leyendas ("Homage to two legends") as CMLL honored both Lutteroth and another retired or deceased wrestler. This was the second overall March supercard show held by CMLL.

In the main event of the nine match show, Silver King defeated La Fiera in a best two-out-of-three falls Lucha de Apuestas, hair vs. hair match. As a result of his loss, La Fiera had his hair shaved off. The remaining show was dedicated to a one-night tournament for the vacant CMLL World Trios Championship. After three rounds Emilio Charles Jr., Rey Bucanero and El Satánico defeated Apolo Dantés, Black Warrior and Dr. Wagner Jr. to win the championship.

== Production ==
=== Background ===
Since 1996 the Mexican wrestling company Consejo Mundial de Lucha Libre (Spanish for "World Wrestling Council"; CMLL) has held a show in March each year to commemorate the passing of CMLL founder Salvador Lutteroth who died in March 1987. For the first three years the show paid homage to Lutteroth himself, from 1999 through 2004 the show paid homage to Lutteroth and El Santo, Mexico's most famous wrestler ever and from 2005 forward the show has paid homage to Lutteroth and a different leyenda ("Legend") each year, celebrating the career and accomplishments of past CMLL stars. Originally billed as Homenaje a Salvador Lutteroth, it has been held under the Homenaje a Dos Leyendas ("Homage to two legends") since 1999 and is the only show outside of CMLL's Anniversary shows that CMLL has presented every year since its inception. All Homenaje a Dos Leyendas shows have been held in Arena México in Mexico City, Mexico which is CMLL's main venue, its "home". Traditionally CMLL holds their major events on Friday Nights, which means the Homenaje a Dos Leyendas shows replace their regularly scheduled Super Viernes show. The 1997 show was the second overall show officially billed in honor of Salvador Lutteroth.

=== Storylines ===
The Homenaje a Salvador Lutteroth show featured nine professional wrestling matches with different wrestlers involved in pre-existing scripted feuds, plots and storylines. Wrestlers were portrayed as either heels (referred to as rudos in Mexico, those that portray the "bad guys") or faces (técnicos in Mexico, the "good guy" characters) as they followed a series of tension-building events, which culminated in a wrestling match or series of matches.

At the previous year's Homenaje a Salvador Lutteroth show Dos Caras, Héctor Garza and La Fiera defeated Los Chacales (Bestia Salvaje, Emilio Charles Jr. and Sangre Chicana) to win the CMLL World Trios Championship. In the interceding year, the trio of Dos Caras, Garza, and La Fiera did not make a single championship defense. In January 1997 Garza left CMLL, to join rival promotion AAA. As a result CMLL declared the championship vacant and announced a tournament for the Homenaje a Salvador Lutteroth show. The tournament participants include a mixture of established teams and teams who did were not teaming on a regular basis

- Los Brazos (Brazo de Oro and Brazo de Plata) and Shocker
- La Ola Azul (Atlantis and Lizmark) and Rayo de Jalisco Jr.
- Bestia Salvaje, El Hijo del Santo and Scorpio Jr.
- Emilio Charles Jr. and Los Infernales (Rey Bucanero and El Satánico)
- Negro Casas, El Dandy, and Mr. Niebla
- Apolo Dantés, Black Warrior and Dr. Wagner Jr.
- Foreign Exchange, Miguel Pérez Jr. and Steel
- Shinobi, Tsubasa and Ultramán Jr.

== Event ==
The main event featured second generation wrestler Silver King, son of Dr. Wagner as he tried to wart off the attacks of rudo veteran La Fiera ("The Fierce"). In Lucha Libre the most important match type is a Lucha de Apuestas, or "Bet match", more important than even championship matches. The two both bet their hair on the outcome of the match, with the loser being shaved bald once the match is finished. Dos Caras, La Fiera and Héctor Garza were the seventh team to become CMLL World Trios Champions but had to vacate the championship when Héctor Garza decided to leave CMLL over a contract dispute. CMLL entered eight trios teams into a one-night tournament to determine the new champions.

== Aftermath ==
Emilio Charles Jr., Rey Bucanero and El Satánico's reign as CMLL World Trios Champions only lasted 39 days, the third shortest of any CMLL World Trios Championship reign. (Note: La Ola Amarilla and the Cl4n both had 14 day reigns, the only reigns less than 39 days.) The trio lost the championship to La Ola Azul ("The Blue Wave"; Atlantis, Lizmark and Mr. Niebla) on April 29, 1997.

== Results ==
No.	Results	Stipulations
1	Rey Bucanero and Tsubasa defeated Black Warrior, Foreign Exchange, Mr. Niebla, Rayo de Jalisco Jr., Scorpió Jr., and Shocker	8-man Seeding Battle Royal
2	Foreign Exchange, Miguel Pérez Jr. and Steel defeated Los Brazos (Brazo de Oro and Brazo de Plata) and Shocker	Six-man "Lucha Libre rules" tag team match CMLL World Trios Championship Tournament quarterfinal
3	Apolo Dantés, Black Warrior and Dr. Wagner Jr. defeated El Dandy, Mr. Niebla and Negro Casas	Six-man "Lucha Libre rules" tag team match CMLL World Trios Championship Tournament quarterfinal
4	Atlantis, Lizmark and Rayo de Jalisco Jr. defeated Bestia Salvaje, El Hijo Del Santo and Scorpio Jr.	Six-man "Lucha Libre rules" tag team match CMLL World Trios Championship Tournament quarterfinal
5	Emilio Charles Jr., Rey Bucanero and El Satánico defeated Shinobi, Tsubasa and Ultramán Jr.	Six-man "Lucha Libre rules" tag team match CMLL World Trios Championship Tournament quarterfinal
6	Apolo Dantés, Black Warrior and Dr. Wagner Jr. defeated Foreign Exchange, Miguel Pérez Jr. and Steel	Six-man "Lucha Libre rules" tag team match CMLL World Trios Championship Tournament semifinal
7	Emilio Charles Jr., Rey Bucanero and El Satánico defeated Atlantis, Lizmark and Rayo de Jalisco Jr.	Six-man "Lucha Libre rules" tag team match CMLL World Trios Championship Tournament semifinal
8	Emilio Charles Jr., Rey Bucanero and El Satánico defeated Apolo Dantés, Black Warrior and Dr. Wagner Jr.	Six-man "Lucha Libre rules" tag team match CMLL World Trios Championship Tournament Final
9	Silver King defeated La Fiera	Best two-out-of-three falls Lucha de Apuestas, Hair vs. Hair match

=== CMLL World Trios Championship tournament brackets ===
Quarter finals
Foreign Exchange, Miguel Pérez Jr. and Steel	W
Shocker, Brazo de Oro and Brazo de Plata
Apolo Dantés, Black Warrior and Dr. Wagner Jr.	W
El Dandy, Mr. Niebla and Negro Casas
Atlantis, Lizmark and Rayo de Jalisco Jr.	W
Bestia Salvaje, El Hijo Del Santo and Scorpio Jr.
Emilio Charles Jr., Rey Bucanero and El Satánico	W
Shinobi, Tsubasa and Ultramán Jr.

Semi finals
Foreign Exchange, Miguel Pérez Jr. and Steel
Apolo Dantés, Black Warrior and Dr. Wagner Jr.	W
Atlantis, Lizmark and Rayo de Jalisco Jr.
Emilio Charles Jr., Rey Bucanero and El Satánico	W

Final
Apolo Dantés, Black Warrior and Dr. Wagner Jr.
Emilio Charles Jr., Rey Bucanero and El Satánico	W
