= CMLL International Gran Prix (2003) =

Mexican professional wrestling tournament

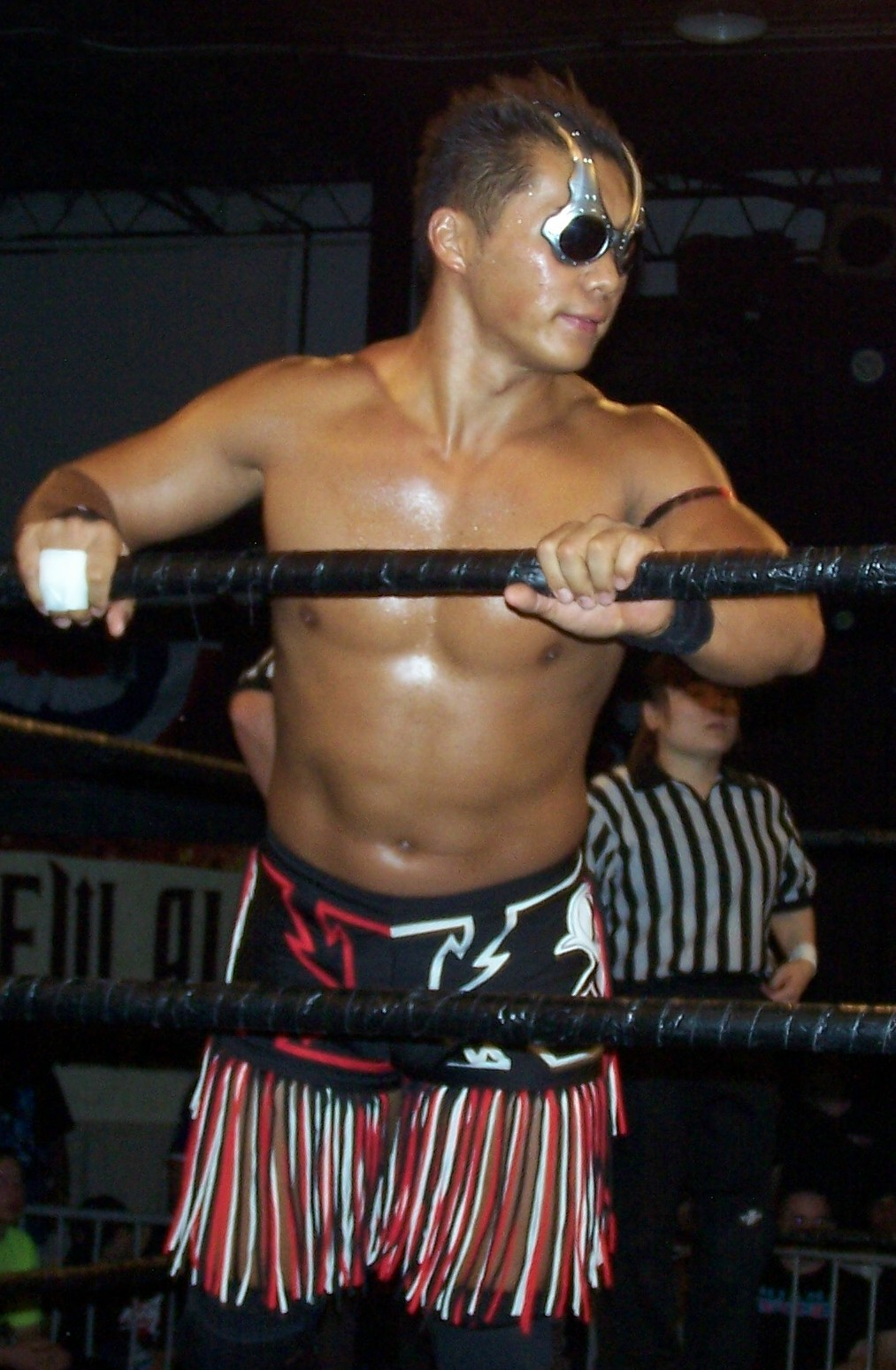
- CIMA, representing Team Japan
- Promotion: Consejo Mundial de Lucha Libre
- Date: May 9, 2003
- City: Mexico City, Mexico
- Venue: Arena México

Event chronology
| ← Previous; 47. Aniversario de Arena México | Next → Leyenda de Azul |

International Gran Prix chronology
| ← Previous; 2002 | Next → 2005 |

The CMLL International Gran Prix (2003) was a lucha libre, or professional wrestling, tournament produced and scripted by the Mexican professional wrestling promotion Consejo Mundial de Lucha Libre (CMLL; "World Wrestling Council" in Spanish) which took place on May 9, 2003 in Arena México, Mexico City, Mexico, CMLL's main venue. The 2003 International Gran Prix was the seventh time CMLL has held an International Gran Prix tournament since 1994. All International Gran Prix tournaments have been a one-night tournament, always as part of CMLL's Friday night CMLL Super Viernes shows.

The seventh International Gran Prix tournament was the second time where the format was as 16-man Tornero Cibernetico. This time the teams were "Team Mexico" (El Felino, Virus, Negro Casas, Mephisto, Averno, Blue Panther, Shocker and Dr. Wagner Jr.) and "Team Japan" (TARU, Don Fujii, Kazuhiko Masada, SUWA, Katsushi Takemura, Nosawa, CIMA and Último Dragón). The match came down to Último Dragón and Dr. Wagner Jr. and then saw Dr. Wagner Jr. win the Gran Prix for the "home team".

== Production ==
=== Background ===
In 1994 the Mexican professional wrestling promotion Consejo Mundial de Lucha Libre (CMLL) organized their first ever International Gran Prix tournament. The first tournament followed the standard "single elimination" format and featured sixteen wrestlers in total, eight representing Mexico and eight "international" wrestlers. In the end Mexican Rayo de Jalisco Jr. defeated King Haku in the finals to win the tournament. In 1995 CMLL brought the tournament back, creating an annual tournament held every year from 1995 through 1998 and then again in 2002, 2003 and finally from 2005 through 2008.

=== Storylines ===
The CMLL Gran Prix show featured three professional wrestling matches scripted by CMLL with some wrestlers involved in scripted feuds. The wrestlers portray either heels (referred to as rudos in Mexico, those that play the part of the "bad guys") or faces (técnicos in Mexico, the "good guy" characters) as they perform.

== Tournament ==
=== Tournament overview ===
| # | Eliminated | Team |
|---|---|---|
| 1 | TARU | Team Japan |
| 2 | El Felino | Team Mexico |
| 3 | Virus | Team Mexico |
| 4 | Don Fujii | Team Japan |
| 5 | MAZADA (Double elimination) | Team Japan |
| 5 | Negro Casas (Double elimination) | Team Mexico |
| 7 | Mephisto | Team Mexico |
| 8 | SUWA | Team Japan |
| 9 | Katsushi Takemura | Team Japan |
| 10 | Averno | Team Mexico |
| 11 | Blue Panther | Team Mexico |
| 12 | Nosawa | Team Japan |
| 13 | CIMA | Team Japan |
| 14 | Shocker | Team Mexico |
| 15 | Último Dragón | Team Japan |
| 16 | Dr. Wagner Jr. (Winner) | Team Mexico |

=== Tournament show ===
| No. | Results | Stipulations |
|---|---|---|
| 1 | Dr. Wagner Jr. defeated Averno, Blue Panther, CIMA, Don Fuiji, El Felino, MAZADA, Mephisto, Negro Casas, Nosawa, Shocker, SUWA, TARU, Último Dragón, and Virus | 2003 International Gran Prix 16-man torneo cibernetico elimination match |
| 2 | Brazo de Plata, Cien Caras, and Gran Markus Jr. defeated Los Boricuas (Pierroth Jr., Sadam, and Violencia) | Best two-out-of-three falls six-man tag team match |
