= Homenaje a Salvador Lutteroth (1996) =

Mexican Professional wrestling show

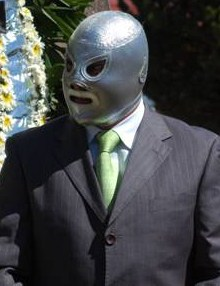
- El Hijo del Santo, participated in the Torneo de Alto Rendimiento
- Promotion: Consejo Mundial de Lucha Libre
- Date: March 22, 1996
- City: Mexico City, Mexico
- Venue: Arena México

Event chronology
← Previous; La Copa Junior	Next →: 40. Aniversario de Arena México

Homenaje a Dos Leyendas chronology
← Previous; First	Next → 1997

Homenaje a Salvador Lutteroth (1996) (Spanish for "Homage to Salvador Lutteroth") was a professional wrestling supercard show event, scripted and produced by Consejo Mundial de Lucha Libre (CMLL; "World Wrestling Council"). The Homenaje show took place on March 22, 1996 in CMLL's main venue, Arena México, Mexico City, Mexico. The event was to honor and remember CMLL founder Salvador Lutteroth, who died in March 1987. The annual March event would later be renamed Homenaje a Dos Leyendas ("Homage to two legends") as CMLL honored both Lutteroth and another retired or deceased wrestler. With the show, CMLL introduced an annual supercard show in March to their show schedule.

The main event was a best two-out-of-three falls match where Rambo defeated El Brazo. The match was held under Lucha de Apuestas rules, which meant that both men their hair on the outcome of the match and forced EL Brazo to be shaved bald because he lost. The show also featured a Six-man "Lucha Libre rules" tag team match for the CMLL World Trios Championship as champions Los Chacales ("The Jackals"; Bestia Salvaje, Emilio Charles Jr. and Sangre Chicana) lost the championship to Dos Caras, Héctor Garza and La Fiera. On the under card CMLL held the Torneo de Alto Rendimiento ("High Performance Tournament"), an eight man torneo cibernetico elimination match for a "Copa Salvador Lutteroth" plaque won by Atlantis, as well as at least one additional match.

== Production ==
=== Background ===
Since 1996 the Mexican wrestling company Consejo Mundial de Lucha Libre (Spanish for "World Wrestling Council"; CMLL) has held a show in March each year to commemorate the passing of CMLL founder Salvador Lutteroth who died in March 1987. For the first three years the show paid homage to Lutteroth himself, from 1999 through 2004 the show paid homage to Lutteroth and El Santo, Mexico's most famous wrestler ever and from 2005 forward the show has paid homage to Lutteroth and a different leyenda ("Legend") each year, celebrating the career and accomplishments of past CMLL stars. Originally billed as Homenaje a Salvador Lutteroth, it has been held under the Homenaje a Dos Leyendas ("Homage to two legends") since 1999 and is the only show outside of CMLL's Anniversary shows that CMLL has presented every year since its inception. All Homenaje a Dos Leyendas shows have been held in Arena México in Mexico City, Mexico which is CMLL's main venue, its "home". Traditionally CMLL holds their major events on Friday Nights, which means the Homenaje a Dos Leyendas shows replace their regularly scheduled Super Viernes show. The show was the first show to officially be labeled as honoring CMLL founder Salvador Lutteroth although CMLL had regularly held shows in the month of March prior to 1996, dedicated to Lutteroth or other wrestlers who had died.

=== Storylines ===
The Homenaje a Salvador Lutteroth show featured five professional wrestling matches with different wrestlers involved in pre-existing scripted feuds, plots and storylines. Wrestlers were portrayed as either heels (referred to as rudos in Mexico, those that portray the "bad guys") or faces (técnicos in Mexico, the "good guy" characters) as they followed a series of tension-building events, which culminated in a wrestling match or series of matches.

El Brazo and Rambo initially faced off against each other for the first time in CMLL on March 8, 1996 as Rambo, Bestia Salvaje and Máscara Año 2000 defeated Los Brazos (El Brazo, Brazo de Oro, and Brazo de Plata) in the main event of the night. The following week, Los Brazos defeated Rambo, Dr. Wagner Jr. and Negro Casas by disqualification as El Brazo goaded Rambo into breaking the rules and getting caught. Afterward Rambo made a Lucha de Apuestas challenge, that led to the main event of the Homenaje a Salvador Lutteroth show.

Los Chacales (Spanish for "The Jackals"; Bestia Salvaje, Emilio Charles Jr. and Sangre Chicana) won the CMLL World Trios Championship on March 31, 1995 as they defeated La Nueva Ola Blanca ("The New White Wave"; Gran Markus Jr., El Hijo del Gladiador and Dr. Wagner Jr.). During the 357 days preceding the 1996 Homenaje a Salvador Lutteroth show. Los Chacales made no documented championship defenses, The only documented match for the entire trio took place on March 15, 1996 as the trio lost to Dos Caras, La Fiera and Héctor Garza to set up the match at Homenaje a Salvador Lutteroth.

== Aftermath ==
The then bald El Brazo, along with Brazo de Oro and Brazo de Plata, defeated Rambo, Blue Panther, and Kahoz by disqualification the following week. They also found themselves on opposite sides once more during the 1996 Torneo Gran Alternativa as Rambo and Guerrero de la Muerte defeated El Brazo and Olimpus in the quarter-finals.

The new CMLL World Trios Champions would hold on to the titles until early 1997 when Héctor Garza and the Championship had to be vacated. A tournament to determine the new Trios champions took place on the following year's Homenaje a Salvador Lutteroth show.

== Results ==
No.	Results	Stipulations
1	Guerrero Maya, Guerrero del Futuro and Halcón Negro Jr. defeated Olímpico, Ciclón Ramirez and Filoso	Best two-out-of-three falls six-man "Lucha Libre rules" tag team match
2	El Bronco, Humberto Garza Jr. and Máscara Mágica defeated Arkangel de la Muerte, Chicago Express and Scorpio Jr.	Best two-out-of-three falls six-man "Lucha Libre rules" tag team match
3	Atlantis defeated Lizmark, El Dandy, El Hijo Del Santo, Dr. Wagner Jr., Negro Casas, El Felino and Blue Panther	Torneo de Alto Rendimiento, 8-man Torneo cibernetico elimination match
4	Dos Caras, Héctor Garza and La Fiera defeated Los Chacales (Bestia Salvaje, Emilio Charles Jr. and Sangre Chicana) (C)	Best two-out-of-three falls six-man "Lucha Libre rules" tag team match for the CMLL World Trios Championship
5	Rambo defeated El Brazo	Best two-out-of-three falls Lucha de Apuestas, Hair vs. Hair match
