= Homenaje a Salvador Lutteroth (1998) =

Mexican Professional wrestling show

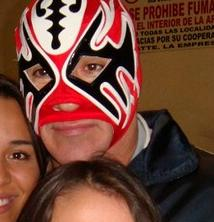
- Atlantis, one of eight participants in the Torneo Salvador Lutteroth
- Promotion: Consejo Mundial de Lucha Libre
- Date: March 20, 1998
- City: Mexico City, Mexico
- Venue: Arena México

Event chronology
← Previous; Juicio Final	Next →: 42. Aniversario de Arena México

Homenaje a Dos Leyendas chronology
← Previous; 1997	Next → 1999

Homenaje a Salvador Lutteroth (1998) (Spanish for "Homage to Salvador Lutteroth") was a professional wrestling supercard show event, scripted and produced by Consejo Mundial de Lucha Libre (CMLL; "World Wrestling Council"). The Homenaje show took place on March 20, 1998 in CMLL's main venue, Arena México, Mexico City, Mexico. The event was to honor and remember CMLL founder Salvador Lutteroth, who died in March 1987. The annual March event would later be renamed Homenaje a Dos Leyendas ("Homage to two legends") as CMLL honored both Lutteroth and another retired or deceased wrestler. This was the third overall March supercard show held by CMLL and the last to only honor Lutteroth, it would be renamed Homenaje a Dos Leyendas ("Homage to two legends") as CMLL honored both Lutteroth and another retired or deceased wrestler.

The main event was a best two-out-of-three falls match, fought under Lucha de Apuestas, or "Bet match" rules. The match saw Emilio Charles Jr. defeat El Satánico. As a result El Satánico was forced to have all his hair shaved off after the match in full view of the crowd as per Lucha Libre traditions. The show also hosted a Torneo Salvador Lutteroth in honor of the CMLL founder, which was a one night eight-man single elimination tournament featuring some of CMLL's top competitors at the time, including the then reigning CMLL World Heavyweight Champion Universo 2000. The final of the tournament saw Mr. Niebla defeated Black Warrior.

== Production ==
=== Background ===
Since 1996 the Mexican wrestling company Consejo Mundial de Lucha Libre (Spanish for "World Wrestling Council"; CMLL) has held a show in March each year to commemorate the passing of CMLL founder Salvador Lutteroth who died in March 1987. For the first three years the show paid homage to Lutteroth himself, from 1999 through 2004 the show paid homage to Lutteroth and El Santo, Mexico's most famous wrestler ever and from 2005 forward the show has paid homage to Lutteroth and a different leyenda ("Legend") each year, celebrating the career and accomplishments of past CMLL stars. Originally billed as Homenaje a Salvador Lutteroth, it has been held under the Homenaje a Dos Leyendas ("Homage to two legends") since 1999 and is the only show outside of CMLL's Anniversary shows that CMLL has presented every year since its inception. All Homenaje a Dos Leyendas shows have been held in Arena México in Mexico City, Mexico which is CMLL's main venue, its "home". Traditionally CMLL holds their major events on Friday Nights, which means the Homenaje a Dos Leyendas shows replace their regularly scheduled Super Viernes show. The 1998 show was the third overall show officially billed in honor of Salvador Lutteroth and the last dedicated exclusively to Lutteroth's memory

=== Storylines ===
The Homenaje a Salvador Lutteroth show featured nine professional wrestling matches with different wrestlers involved in pre-existing scripted feuds, plots and storylines. Wrestlers were portrayed as either heels (referred to as rudos in Mexico, those that portray the "bad guys") or faces (técnicos in Mexico, the "good guy" characters) as they followed a series of tension-building events, which culminated in a wrestling match or series of matches.

In early 1998 Consejo Mundial de Lucha Libre (CMLL) announced that they were planning on holding a one night, single elimination tournament on a special show on March 20, 1999, dedicated to the memory of Salvador Lutteroth, the founder of CMLL. The tournament gathered eight of the top competitors in the promotion at the time including the then reigning CMLL World Heavyweight Champion Universo 2000 as well as Atlantis, Black Warrior, El Felino, Karloff Lagarde Jr., Mr. Niebla, Shocker and Último Dragón. The main event was the planned culmination of a storyline feud between wrestlers Emilio Charles Jr. and El Satánico, who up until a point had teamed on a regular basis including a stint holding the CMLL World Trios Championship (along with Rey Bucanero). Following their championship loss the two had a falling out that led to the two of them fighting each other over the proceeding months in a variety of matches as the storyline hatred between the two escalated to the point where both men agreed to bet their hair on the outcome of their Homenaje a Salvador Lutteroth match.

== Event ==
In the opening match the rudo team of Gran Markus Jr. and Los Hermanos Dinamita ("The Dynamite Brothers"; Cien Caras and Máscara Año 2000) defeated the tecnico team of veterans Brazo de Plata and Rayo de Jalisco Jr. teaming up with relative newcomer Tigre Blanco. This was one of the first matches he worked under the ring name Tigre Blanco, having changed identities only a few months prior from Kid Guzmán.

The tournament started off with the rudo Black Warrior defeating El Felino followed by Japanese wrestler Último Dragón defeating the second-generation wrestler Karloff Lagarde Jr. In the third match of the opening round Mr. Niebla defeated the then reigning CMLL World Heavyweight Champion Universo 2000 in a bit of a surprise and finally Atlantis defeated Shocker. In the second round Black Warrior eliminated Último Dragón, having to resort to cheating to defeat him and Mr. Niebla built on his momentum by defeating Atlantis. In the last round the Mr. Niebla defeated Black Warrior to win the entire tournament. The victory was quickly overshadowed by the actions that took place after the match was over. Universo 2000 ran to the ring and attacked both Mr. Niebla as well as Rayo de Jalisco Sr. who was in the ring to present the trophy to Mr. Niebla. Moments later Rayo de Jalisco Jr. came to the ring to help his father, but was attacked by Steel, making a surprise appearance and then attacked Rayo Jr. He would pull Rayo Jr.'s mask off, hang it on the ring post and then light the mask on fire in one of the ultimate signs of disrespect in Lucha Libre.

In the main event Emilio Charles Jr. lost the first fall to El Satánico, but fought back to claim both the second and third fall for himself and celebrated as Satánico had all his hair shaved off afterwards.

== Aftermath ==
The storyline between Emilio Charles Jr. and El Satánico ended with their Luchas de Apuestas match. Satánico would go on to recreate Los Infernales and focus on tag team and trios work while Emilio Charles Jr. moved on to other storylines. The Torneo Salvador Lutteroth tournament win was quickly overshadowed by the subsequent angle that involved Rayo de Jalisco Jr. which led to Rayo de Jalisoco Jr. defeating Universo 2000 to win the CMLL World Heavyweight Championship on September 18, 1998. Mr. Niebla would not win the heavyweight title until 2003. CMLL held another Torneo Salvador Lutteroth the following year as part of their annual Homenaje a Dos Leyendas: El Santo y Salvador Lutteroth event, this time it was a tag team tournament instead of a singles tournament.

== Results ==
No.	Results	Stipulations
1	Cien Caras, Gran Markus Jr. and Máscara Año 2000 defeated Brazo de Plata, Rayo de Jalisco Jr. and Tigre Blanco	Six-man "Lucha Libre rules" tag team match
2	Black Warrior defeated El Felino	Torneo Salvador Lutteroth Quarterfinal
3	Último Dragón defeated Karloff Lagarde Jr.	Torneo Salvador Lutteroth Quarterfinal
4	Mr. Niebla defeated Universo 2000	Torneo Salvador Lutteroth Quarterfinal
5	Atlantis defeated Shocker	Torneo Salvador Lutteroth Quarterfinal
6	Black Warrior defeated Último Dragón	Torneo Salvador Lutteroth Semifinal
7	Mr. Niebla defeated Atlantis	Torneo Salvador Lutteroth Semifinal
8	Mr. Niebla defeated Black Warrior	Torneo Salvador Lutteroth Final
9	Emilio Charles Jr. defeated El Satánico	Lucha de Apuesta, Hair vs. Hair match

=== Tournament bracket ===
Quarter finals
Black Warrior	W
El Felino
Último Dragón	W
Karloff Lagarde Jr.
Mr. Niebla	W
Universo 2000
Atlantis	W
Shocker

Semi finals
Black Warrior	W
Último Dragón
Mr. Niebla	W
Atlantis

Final
Black Warrior
Mr. Niebla	W
