= Headhunters (professional wrestling) =

Professional wrestling disbanded tag team

The Headhunters

Tag team
- Members: Headhunter A / Squat Teamer #1 / Mofat / Demon Clown; Headhunter B / Squat Teamer #2 / Mahim
- Name(s): The Headhunters; The Squat Team; The Arabian Butchers; Los Reggaetones; Los Sabrosos
- Billed heights: 5 ft 11 in (1.80 m) (both)
- Combined billed weight: 652 lb (296 kg) (even)
- Billed from: Puerto Rico
- Debut: 1987
- Disbanded: October 14, 2018
- Trained by: Johnny Rodz

The Headhunters were a professional wrestling tag team who consists of American twin brothers Manuel and Victor Santiago (born August 11, 1968, in New York, New York), best known by the respective ring names, Headhunter A and Headhunter B, although they were announced as Mofat and Mahim (spellings uncertain) during their appearances in ECW.

== History ==
=== Early career (1987–1991) ===
The Santiago brothers trained under Johnny Rodz and both debuted in 1987. There were among the Puerto Rican wrestlers brought to Canada during the talent exchange between Lutte Internationale and the World Wrestling Council. On June 23, 1987, The Headhunters defeated Len Shelley and Louis Laurence at the Verdun Auditorium in Montreal.

=== W*ING (1991–1994) ===
In 1991 The Headhunters travelled to Japan and began wrestling for W*ING. In August 1992, they were awarded the newly created W*ING International New Generation World Tag Team Championship. They held the titles until November 6, 1992, when they lost to Crash the Terminator and Mr. Pogo in Sapporo. The brothers regained the titles on May 19, 1993, defeating Miguelito Perez and Yukihiro Kanemura in Honjo, and held them until the promotion closed in March 1994.

=== Universal Wrestling Association (1991–1993) ===
The Headhunters went to Mexico working for the Universal Wrestling Association. They feuded with the Los Villanos.

=== NWA Eastern Championship Wrestling (1993) ===
The Headhunters debuted in Eastern Championship Wrestling in August 1993, taking part in a tournament for the vacant ECW Tag Team Championship. The Headhunters were eliminated from the tournament after fighting their opponents, Ivan Koloff and Vladimir Koloff, to a double disqualification. At UltraClash on September 18, 1993, The Headhunters defeated Crash the Terminator and Miguelito Perez in a baseball bat match.

=== Consejo Mundial de Lucha Libre (1992–1999) ===
The Headhunters began wrestling for Consejo Mundial de Lucha Libre in the 1990s, and on June 30, 1995 in Mexico City they defeated El Texano and Silver King to win the CMLL World Tag Team Championship. They held the titles until November 3, 1995, when they were defeated by Atlantis and Rayo de Jalisco, Jr.

=== Return to Japan (1994–1997) ===
The Headhunters returned to Japan in the mid-1990s. They joined the International Wrestling Association of Japan soon after its inception, and became the first IWA World Tag Team Champions by defeating Dick Slater and Nobutaka Araya on November 17, 1994, in Yokohama. They lost the titles to El Texano and Silver King on March 3, 1995, in Hiroshima, but regained them on August 20, 1995, in Kawasaki, Kanagawa. Their second reign ended when they lost to Cactus Jack and Tracy Smothers on September 29, 1995, in Yokohama. The brothers also wrestled for Frontier Martial-Arts Wrestling, and on March 30, 1996, they defeated Super Leather and Jason the Terrible in Tokyo to win the FMW Brass Knuckles Tag Team Championship. They held the titles for over a year, finally losing to Hido and Kanemura on April 25, 1997, in Osaka. The Headhunters also held the FMW World Street Fight Six Man Tag Team Championship on two occasions in 1996, teaming with Super Leather and Hisakatsu Oya respectively.

=== World Wrestling Federation (1996–1997) ===
The Headhunters debuted in the World Wrestling Federation on January 21, 1996, at the WWF Royal Rumble, renamed "The Squat Team". Identified as "Squat Team #1" and "Squat Team #2" respectively, the Headhunters took part in the Royal Rumble match, but were both eliminated, with Yokozuna eliminating Team #2 after 24 seconds and Vader eliminating Team #1 after 71 seconds. The night after Royal Rumble they lost to Avatar and Aldo Montoya in a dark match. The Headhunters briefly appeared on WWF television as "The Arabian Butchers" on the June 30, 1997, episode of Raw, a tag team managed by Jim Cornette. They made an appearance for Shotgun Saturday Night on November 25, 1997 in a dark match losing to Los Boricuas (Savio Vega and Miguel Perez Jr.).

=== Extreme Championship Wrestling (1996) ===
The Headhunters returned to Eastern Championship Wrestling, since renamed Extreme Championship Wrestling, in January 1996. On February 17, 1996, at ECW CyberSlam 1996, losing to The Bruise Brothers. In March 1996 at Big Ass Extreme Bash, losing to the Dudleys (Buh Buh Ray Dudley and Dances with Dudley) in a tag team bout and losing to The Gangstas and the team of 2 Cold Scorpio and The Sandman in a three-way tag team match. They made their final appearance with the promotion in April 1996 at Massacre on Queens Boulevard, again losing to The Gangstas and 2 Cold Scorpio and The Sandman in a three-way tag team match.

=== Mexican independent circuit (1997–2006) ===
On September 11, 1997 the Headhunters teamed with Jake Roberts losing to Hakushi, Hayabusa, and Masato Tanaka at Terry Funk's WrestleFest in Amarillo, Texas.

In the 2000s, The Headhunters began wrestling on the Mexican independent circuit. In November 2006, The Headhunters began working dates for Asistencia Asesoría y Administración. Headhunter A would become a regular in the spring, officially joining heel stable Legión Extranjera. He quit the promotion in September 2008, choosing to return to the independent circuit. Both Headhunters have since worked regularly for IWRG and NWA Mexico. In December 2008, the two wrestled on the debut Perros del Mal Producciones show promoted by Perro Aguayo Jr.

=== Later career (2006–2018) ===
On July 15, 2006 they wrestled for Juggalo Championship Wrestling losing to Kevin Sullivan and Rude Boy.

They also made return tours in Mexico and Japan. They participated in Game Changer Wrestling's Jersey J-Cup Tag Team Tournament defeating in the first round Danny Demanto and Tommy Dreamer. Later that night they got eliminated from the tournament in the semi-final to The Beast Squad, Kyle the Beast and Monsta Mack.

== In popular culture ==
- The Headhunters were featured in the Insane Clown Posse's wrestling DVDs Strangle Mania (1995) and Strangle Mania 2 (1999) under the name "The Mushroom Boys".

== Championships and accomplishments ==
- Consejo Mundial de Lucha Libre
  - CMLL World Tag Team Championship (1 time)
  - International Gran Prix (1995) (Headhunter A)
- Frontier Martial-Arts Wrestling
  - FMW Brass Knuckles Tag Team Championship (1 time)
  - FMW/WEW 6-Man Tag Team Championship / FMW World Street Fight Six Man Tag Team Championship (2 times) – with Super Leather (1) and Hisakatsu Oya (1)
- International Wrestling Association of Japan
  - IWA World Tag Team Championship (IWA Japan version) (2 times)
- International Wrestling Association
  - IWA World Tag Team Championship (1 time) - with Andy Anderson (Headhunter B)
- International Wrestling Revolution Group
  - IWRG Intercontinental Heavyweight Championship (1 time) (Headhunter A)
  - IWRG Intercontinental Trios Championship (1 time) – Headhunter A with Damián 666 and X-Fly
- Wrestling International New Generations
  - W*ING World Tag Team Championship (2 times)
- World Wrestling Council
  - NWA North American Tag Team Championship (1 time)
