= Miguel Pérez Jr. =

Puerto Rican wrestler (born 1966)

Personal information
- Born: April 22, 1966 (age 60) Carolina, Puerto Rico
- Parent: Miguel Pérez (father)

Professional wrestling career
- Ring name(s): Faraón Zaruxx; Jose Perez; Miguel Pérez; Miguel Pérez Jr. Miguelito Pérez
- Billed height: 6 ft 1 in (185 cm)
- Billed weight: 229 lb (104 kg)
- Trained by: Miguel Pérez Sr. Tomás Marín; El Maravilla; Lou Thesz
- Debut: 1984

Miguel Pérez Jr. (born April 22, 1966) is a Puerto Rican professional wrestler. The son of fellow professional wrestler Miguel Pérez, he began his career in Puerto Rico's World Wrestling Council, winning several championships including the Puerto Rico and Caribbean Heavyweight championships.

In addition to his appearances in Puerto Rico with the World Wrestling Council and the International Wrestling Association, Pérez Jr. has appeared in Japan with All Japan Pro Wrestling, New Japan Pro-Wrestling, W*ING and International Wrestling Association Japan; in Mexico with Consejo Mundial de Lucha Libre; and in the United States with Extreme Championship Wrestling, World Championship Wrestling, and the World Wrestling Federation.

== Early life ==
Pérez is the son of Miguel Pérez, who is one half of the first tag team champions crowned in WWE, winning the NWA Capitol World Tag Team Championship along Antonino Rocca, when the promotion was still known as "Capitol Wrestling" and was affiliated to the National Wrestling Alliance.

== Professional wrestling career ==
=== Early career ===
Pérez debuted in 1984 at the Dominican Republic at Santo Domingo Sports Promotions teaming with his father vs. Los Kimbas. He did his first tour to All Japan Pro-Wrestling during his rookie year. Later in 1985 went to WWC in Puerto Rico and got involved in an angle where his father Miguel Pérez Sr. appeared as a photographer at ring side taking pictures and scouting opponents before Miguel Pérez Jr.'s debut. During a match Eric Embry attacked Miguel Pérez Sr. with the camera in hand and Miguel Pérez Jr. came to his father's rescue. This eventually lead to Pérez Jr.'s Puerto Rico debut match September 21, 1985. Had a feud with The Crusher in early 1986. At Aniversario 1986, Pérez unsuccessfully challenged Ric Flair for the NWA World Heavyweight Championship. At Aniversario 1987, he defeated Reginald Lisowski. At Aniversario 1988, Pérez teamed with Huracan Castillo Jr. to defeat Bobby Jaggers and Dan Kroffat in a hair vs hair match. In 1989, he joined Castillo in a tour to New Japan Pro-Wrestling, with both being rebranded as "José Pérez" and "Daniel Castillo", using their middle names as their firsts, collectively known as "The Caribbean Express". On February 22, 1989, they lost to Kuniaki Kobayashi and Osamu Kido. The Caribbean Express repeated this performance in their next appearance. On February 28, 1989, Pérez and Castillo lost to Kengo Kimura and Tatsumi Fujinami. They opened the Big Fight Series with a lost, a tour where both wrestled alongside Memphis based wrestler and USWA Champion Jerry Lawler. In the second date, The Caribbean Express defeated Hirozaku Hata and Naoki Sano. They then joined Sid Vicious to defeat Kengo Kimura, Sano and Tatsumi Fujinami. This was followed by a loss to Kobayashi and Masa Saito in a rematch. In his first singles match for NJPW, Pérez was unsuccessful in challenging the owner of NJPW, Antonio Inoki twice. The Caribbean Express once again teamed with Vicious in consecutive losses to Hiroshi Hase, Masa Saito & Riki Choshu and Kengo Kimura, Shiro Koshinaka and Tatsumi Fujinami. On March 12, 1989, Pérez and Castillo lost to Hirokazu Hata and Naoki Sano. In the following two events, Kuniaki Kobayashi teamed with Hiro Saito and Naoki Sano to earn consecutive victories over The Caribbean Express. Returning to WWC for Aniversario 1989, Pérez and Castillo dropped the WWC Caribbean Tag Team Championship to David Sierra and Gerry Morrow. At Aniversario 1990, Pérez and Castillo retained over Sierra and Ron Starr. In late 1990, he returned to NJPW now as a singles wrestler and was rebranded as "Miguelito Pérez". He teamed with Owen Hart in a loss to Kengo Kimura and Osamu Kido. On October 5, 1990, Pérez teamed with Chris Benoit to defeat Shiro Koshinaka and Jushin Thunder Liger. In his next appearance, Masa Saito and Shinya Hashimoto won a tag team match over him and Ricky Steamboat. Teaming once again with Hart, he lost to Keiji Muto and Masahiro Chono. On October 11, 1990, he lost a singles match to Masa Saito. Pérez then joined Benoit and Vader in a loss to Animal Hamaguchi, Tatsutoshi Goto and Super Strong Machine. On October 14, 1990, he teamed with TNT to defeat Kengo Kimura and Kuniaki Kobayashi. At New Year Dash, Pérez teamed with Benoit in a victory over the Dragon Bombers of Black Cat and Takayuki Iizuka. This was followed by a win in a three on three match, where he teamed with Benoit and Monsieur Rambo. Pérez then teamed with Poirier to defeat Tatsumi Fujinami and Kimura. The team of TNT and Pérez lost their second match together, but both teamed again in six-man tag matches that involved Vader, with mixed results against Mutoh, Chono, Hashimoto, Masa Saito, Kobayashi and Animal Hamaguchi. His following match was another three on three, where he teamed with Poirier and Marcus Laurinaitis in a loss to Kimura, Fujinami and Osamu Kido. He then teamed with Laurinaitis in a loss to Kido and Kimura. The following week, TNT replaced Lauranaitis in a win over the same team of Kimura and Kido. On May 27, 1991, Chono defeated Pérez in a singles match. In his following appearance, he teamed with TNT and Vader in a win over Keiji Muto, Kimura and Fujinami. Fujinami went on to win a singles match between them. In the next event, the Dragon Bombers of Liger and Koshinaka defeated Pérez and Benoit. At The Legend of Dragon Tatsumi Fujinami 20th Anniversary both teamed with Strong Machine in a loss to Kimura, Kido and Steve Keirn.

At Aniversario 1991, Pérez reunited with Castillo to defeat Samu and Fatu. In the second half of 1991, Pérez went on a tour for the Universal Wrestling Association, where he debuted winning a six-man two out of three falls match. His second contest was under the same rules, but his team ended being disqualified. Pérez then teamed with Jeff "Giant Warrior" Bearden, but ended on the losing end of a tag team match against Mil Mascaras and El Canek. After losing another match, the team firmed a partnership with Ricky Santana. Together they won three consecutive six man two out of three falls matches. On November 24, 1991, Pérez unsuccessfully competed for the UWA World Heavyweight Championship. He then returned to Japan, now performing for Wrestling International New Generation, losing his first tag team match. In his first singles match at WING, Pérez defeated Vic Steamboat. Before concluding this tour, he lost a match to Santana, who wrestled as "The Iceman". From that point onwards, Pérez and Santana remained a mainstay team, being joined by other heels in six man tag team matches. They returned to the UWA winning consecutive matches, before evening the count by losing twice and then losing a six-man two out of three falls contest. On June 6, 1992, Pérez and Santana were scheduled to compete on World Championship Wrestling's tournament for the NWA World Tag Team Championship, but were unable to attend the event. To advance the storyline, their scheduled opponents, The Steiner Brothers, were declared winners by forfeit after they were said to have been "involved in a car accident", with implications that they had actually been assaulted backstage. Upon returning to the UWA, he was involved in the losing side of a six-man tag team match. At Aniversario 1992, Pérez defeated Abdullah the Butcher by disqualification. He gathered a 2–2 record on his next UWA matches, before reuniting with Santana. Together, they won five consecutive matches. This winning streak was snapped by a team known as Los Misioneros de la Muerte (Negro Navarro, El Signo and El Texano), whom they had defeated during this run. Back at WING, Pérez successfully defended the WWC Caribbean Heavyweight Championship. After losing a tag team match, he concluded this tour with a singles victory over William DeMott. After performing once in UWA, Pérez returned to Japan and won the WING World Tag Team Chsmpionship. He won three consecutive singles matches over Takashi Okano and Nobutaka Araya, before dropping the WING Tag Team Championship. He was then involved in the losing half of a team "survival match". Pérez then made a brief tour to the United States for the International Championship Wrestling Alliance and Smoku Mountain Wrestling, but both of his contests were inconclusive.

Pérez then participated in four UWA-Consejo Mundial de Lucha Libre shows, but was in the losing end of team matches in each. Returning to WING, he formed a tag team with Yukihiro Kanemura, winning twice. On May 7, 1993, Pérez defeated Carl Yvon Ouellet. He and Kanemura then challenged The Headhunters for the vacant WING Tag Team Championship, but lost. They also lost a rematch, but Pérez defeated one of the Headhunters in singles competition. After wrestling a no contest, he won three consecutive contests to end this visit. He performed in two tag team matches in UWA, before returning to WING. In his return to Japan, Pérez lost a match to Dick Murdoch and three consecutive team contests involving the Headhunters, but won a battle royal. Pérez then entered a feud with Doug Gilbert, who wrestled masked as "Freddy Krueger" and defeated him in singles competition and a cage team match. Pérez then defeated a jobber and lost two team matches before returning to Puerto Rico. At Aniversario 1993, he wrestled Curtis Hughes as part of a tournament for the vacant WWC Universal Heavyweight Championship, but both were eliminated following a double countout. Upon returning to UWA, Pérez won one and lost two six man team matches, interrupting this to participate in WING's Best Champ, losing another team contest involving Doug Gilbert. After competing in another UWA event, Pérez returned to WING for a season. There he wrestled Gilbert to a double countout, but lost two more team matches involving him. On September 30, 1993, he joined Shoji Nakamaki to unsuccessfully challenge the Headhunters for the WING World Tag Team Championship. In November, he made a single appearance for UWA winning in a six-man tag team match. In WING Pérez formed a tag team with Bill DeMott winning two of their next three contests. On November 26, 1993, Pérez defeated Nobutaka Araya. He teamed with DeMott twice again, dividing results. Pérez then entered a winning streak of four one-on-one matches, including two over DeMott. In his last WING match, he was on the losing side of another tag team match involving Gilbert.

==== IWA Japan and reunion of The Caribbean Express ====
Pérez then joined CMLL, winning his first two appearances, before losing the third. He then entered the 1994 CMLL Grand Prix, defeating Silver King in the opening round and advancing over Atlantis in the quarter finals, before being eliminated by King Haku. He was then involved in three consecutive team losses, before leaving the promotion for its rival, Lucha Libre AAA World Wide. However, Pérez was only involved in three team matches in AAA, instead focusing on Víctor Quiñones IWA Japan promotion. There he won his first singles matches, before losing his first against Araya. After losing a tag team match that involved Murdoch, they teamed to score a win over the Headhunters, who countered by winning their following confrontation. Pérez then teamed with Eddie Gilbert and El Dandy to win his next tag team matches and defeated Araya in a rematch. On July 1, 1994, he interrupted this tour to rejoin Santana in a CMLL show, getting disqualified. Back in IWA Japan, Pérez won three singles matches and lost a tag team contest. He then entered a tournament to crown the IWA Japan World Heavyweight Champion, but lost his semifinal to Dick Slater. Pérez the lost a match against Tracy Smothers before concluding this tour to return to CMLL. There he reunited with Santana and entered a tournament for the first contendership, defeating Los Mendoza in the opening round. They divided results in two unrelated six man team matches, but advanced in the tournament by defeating Los Brazos. Pérez and Santana once again divided results in unrelated matches before defeating the Headhunters in the semifinals. After losing the tournament final, they divided results to end this tour. On September 18, 1994, Péres returned to IWA Japan and defeated Rafael Rodríguez Moreno, teaming with him in a loss the following day. After losing to Michael Kirchner, who was wrestling masked as "Leatherface", Pérez concluded this visit by winning a tag team match and three singles contests. Returning to CMLL, he rejoined Santana and formed an alliance with Daniel "El Satanico" López, gathering a win and a loss together. On October 14, 1994, Pérez lost a two out of three falls hair vs. hair match to Emilio Charles Jr. He then made a brief visit to IWA Japan, losing his two matches. His next three appearances in CMLL were in six-man team matches, finishing with a balance of 2–1. On July 6, 1995, Pérez joined Sierra to unsuccessfully challenge Los Cowboys for the IWA World Tag Team Championship. At the 1995 Gran Prix, he defeated El Rayo de Jalisco Jr. but was eliminated by Víctor "Headhunter A" Santiago. Teaming with Santana and Sierra among others, Pérez went on to win his next three six man tag team matches and defeated Silver King in hair vs. hair lucha de apuesta. This was followed by a losing streak of four six man team matches, which was highlighted by a loss in a hair vs. hair lucha de apuestas against Apolo Dantes. On May 5, 1996, Pérez participated in Frontier Martial Arts Wrestling's 7th Anniversary Show. At CMLL's own anniversary, he was involved in the losing side of a six-man tag team match. On September 27, 1996, Pérez unsuccessfully challenged El Canek for the UWA World Heavyweight Championship. On December 15, 1996, he competed in the Catch Wrestling Association, losing to Tony St. Clair for the CWA British Commonwealth Championship. Back in CMLL, Pérez formed a tag team with Silver King and engaged a feud with Emilio Charles, who gained an advantage by winning two tag team matches and a one-on-one contest.

=== United States ===
On August 8, 1993, Pérez debuted in Extreme Championship Wrestling, forming a tag team with Mitsuhiro Matsunaga. The team debuted by wrestling the Headhunters to a double disqualification. In their second appearance, Pérez and Matsunaga defeated Don Allen and Herve Renesto. On June 8, 1993, they unsuccessfully challenged Doug and Eddie Gilbert for the ECW World Tag Team Championship by getting disqualified. At ECW Ultra Clash 1993, the Headhunters defeated Pérez and DeMott in a "baseball bat" match. On March 13, 1995, he participated in two dark matches prior to World Wrestling Federation's Monday Night Raw. In the first Pérez lost to Louie Spicolli, before defeating his second opponent. On November 10, 1996, Pérez debuted for World Championship Wrestling by defeating Steve Armstrong. Later in the same event he gained a pinfall victory over Jesús "Ciclope" Ortíz. Pérez made his WCW Monday Nitro debut the following night, first winning a dark match over Adolfo Tapia, the original La Parka.

=== World Wrestling Federation (1997–1999) ===
Pérez joined WWF as a singles wrestler in February 1997, initially feuding with Savio Vega. After Vega was fired from the Nation of Domination Pérez joined him to form Puerto Rican stable, Los Boricuas in June of that year. During his run with Los Boricuas, Pérez was involved in the multi-stable 'gang wars' feud, with the group clashing with Truth Commission, Nation of Domination, and Disciples of Apocalypse. As part of Los Boricuas Pérez primarily fought as a tag team alongside Vega, Jose Estrada or Jesus Castillo or in multi-man tag matches across Raw, Shotgun, and Super Astros. Los Boricuas continued as a group until August 1999, when Pérez left WWF along with Estrada and Castillo.

=== International Wrestling Association (1999–2009) ===
==== Los Intocables, La Compañía and Los Auténticos ====
He made his debut as a wrestler in the first set of tapings, defeating Paul Diamond and Brian Lee. In 1999, the IWA entered a developmental deal with the WWF. Pérez began his participation in co-promoted house shows picking a victory over Billy Gunn in consecutive contests On November 2, 1999, Los Boricuas reunited to defeat the Disciples of Apocalypse. In the following show, they once again teamed to defeat The Brood. Pérez's first loss was by countout to The Road Dogg. On April 28, 2000, the Starr Corporation defeated Los Intocables to win the IWA World Tag Team Championship in a match refereed by Vega. Pérez followed this by wrestling Bob Holly to a no contest in a hardcore match. Pérez then feuded with Rivera, losing their first encounter by disqualification. In his next appearance, he teamed with Ricky Banderas in a loss to Rivera and Sewell. On November 24, 2000, Pérez teamed with Steve Corino to defeat Laureano and Yoshihiro Tajiri. The following day he lost a singles match to Rivera. Pérez subsequently adopted a second gimmick, Faraón Zaruxx, a stereotypical mummy wrapped in bandages, which squashed low card performers. At Christmas in PR 2000, he joined Víctor "The Bodyguard" Rodríguez to defeat Andy Anderson and Vyzago. Returning to his actual name, Pérez defeated Banderas in vengeance for turning on him along Castillo. To close the show, Zaruxx won a four-way match. In 2005, Pérez entered a feud with Kasey James. On May 28, 2005, Pérez defeated James in a no disqualification match. In his following matches, he defeated jobbers. At the Víctor "The Bodyguard" Memorial Cup, Pérez defeated Freddie "Blitz" Lozada. Pérez reappeared on February 4, 2006, teaming with Gonzalez in a losing effort. In the summer of that year, the IWA introduced the Copa José Miguel Pérez or José Miguel Pérez Memorial Cup to honor his father. On August 5, 2006, Pérez participated in another tag team match, with the same result. In September, Pérez teamed with González to defeat Rivera and Miguel "Mr. Big" Maldonado. In the final weekend of this month, he won in a six-man tag team match and lost in a tag team appearance, both involving Rivera. At Christmas in PR he was scheduled to face the Estrellas' Mikael Judas. At Masacre en el Valle II, Pérez reunited with Rivera to defeat Judas and Ricky Cruz. In his next appearance, he lost to González. On June 2, 2007, Pérez joined Cotto to defeat the team of Cruz, Richard Rondón and Judas. At the Omar Pérez Barreto Memorial he brought back the Faraón Zaruxx gimmick, losing to José Laureano. After turning heel, he joined Julio César López to wrestle Cotto and Rondón to a no contest. Pérez then teamed with Ricky Vega to defeat Cotto and Freddie "Blitz" Lozada. At Histeria Boricua 2008, Los Autenticos lost to González and Figueroa. At Juicio Final VIII, they defeated "Los Rabiosos", composed by Lozada and Maldonado. However, two days later Lozada teamed with Vega to defeat Los Autenticos. Pérez then entered a feud with Chris Joel, who had been brought in as a victim to La Loteria del Terror. After wrestling two no contests, Joel won their third encounter. After this, Pérez won two consecutive tag team matches against the team of Joel and Rondón. At Golpe de Estado, Los Autenticos teamed with their new member, Dennis Rivera, to lose against Joel, Rondón and a returning James. Pérez then entered a brief rivalry with Edgar "Spectro" Díaz, defeating him in singles and tag team matches. Los Autenticos then entered a feud with a team known as "Los Arabes", with combinations of both exchanging a 2–2 result. At Christmas in PR 2008, Pérez teamed with Bison Smith to challenge Los Arabes for the vacant IWA World Tag Team Championship but lost. At Histeria Boricua 2009, they won a rematch for the titles. Now face, Pérez teamed with Joel but lost to "Los Dueños de la Malicia", Dennis Rivera and Noel Rodríguez. In his next participation, he and Smith lost the Tag Team Championship to La Malicia. Pérez then reunited with Rivera to close the feud with Los Arabes by defeating them twice. Pérez followed this with a feud against Dennis Rivera, with the first two matches being ruled no contests before both exchanged victories. Los Boricuas then entered a rivalry with Joe Bravo and his stable. Pérez defeated both Bravo and his henchman Joan Manuel "El Bacano" Almonte, but failed to capute the IWA Undisputed World Heavyweight Championship from Bravo. In their next encounter, Los Boricuas came on the winning side of a match involving all four of them. This storyline continued during the IWA's 10th Anniversary celebrations, in which they teamed with several former IWA wrestlers to defeat the whole "La Revolución" stable, repeating this result in two subsequent events. Concurrently, the "Faraón Zaruxx" mantle was passed on to another wrestler. On August 29, 2009, Pérez defeated Bravo to win his first Undisputed World Heavyweight Championship. He was successful in his first defense over Almonte. Los Boricuas reunited one last time to defeat La Revolución. Pérez picked two more defenses, before dropping the title to Bravo. One week later, he defeated Rondón in a singles match. On November 1, 2009, Pérez and Vega participated in a Dominican Wrestling Entertainment card, being booked to win the DWE World Tag Team Championship. Los Boricuas held the championships until the promotion's final event of the year. Shortly afterwards, Pérez announced his retirement as an active wrestler, instead remaining involved in administrative issues.

=== Late career (2009–present) ===
Following Hardcore Weekend 2011, a group of unnamed wrestlers began pestering him in random public places as well as assaulting the IWA Champions during events. When confronting them, they identified as "The Academy", led by Chris Angel and Phillip Davian, citing that they only wanted a chance to "bring forth a change needed by the IWA". Pérez unexpectedly reacted by offering them contracts, citing that he actually wanted a change himself, even granting them championship bouts at Christmas in PR 2011. In this event, Rivera became Angel's opponent for the vacant Intercontinental Championship, losing the contest. Rivera demanded a rematch, but Pérez considered it too risky, grudgingly accepting sanctioning it. When Angel retained in a rematch, Pérez intercepted Rivera upon exiting the ring, telling him not to return to the IWA until he became reacquainted with his "roots". Pérez reappeared at Summer Attitude, confronting Rivera after WWC wrestlers counterattacked IWA due an invasion led by him, ruining Víctor Quiñones' Hall of Fame induction, claiming that he didn't meant those "roots". He became increasingly authoritarian, actually firing Hiram Tua following a disagreement between them. Pérez then recruited The Academy as bodyguards, helping Angel to remain undefeated by reversing a decision and firing Cotto when he disagreed. However, Rivera soon returned and The Academy turned on him. An angle between the IWA and the Extreme Wrestling Organization then began, when he faced Cotto in a charity event and told him that he belonged the IWA and should "return home". On December 17, 2011, Cotto won the EWO World Heavyweight Championship, only to be interrupted by Pérez, a scenario that was repeated at EWO's Tierra de Nadie. This was followed by confrontations in IWA's Histeria Boricua and Kaos & Odissey, which expanded to include EWO's CEO, Richard Rondón, as well. On February 25, 2012, following more intervention from the IWA, Cotto issued a challenge to end the conflict, an unification match for the EWO World Heavyweight Championship and IWA Undisputed World Heavyweight Championship. On March 1, 2012, the challenge was accepted by Pérez and Rondón in a backstage segment. At Clash of the Titans, Cotto lost the EWO World Championship, losing to a masked wrestler only known as "Bonecrusher", whom he had defeated to win this belt and had since gained the IWA Undisputed Heavyweight Champion. In this event, Rivera actually interrupted an encounter between both the leaders of both companies, but remained quiet and did not specify his allegiance to either faction. At Payback, Pérez and Rondón where involved in a heated discussion. On May 26, 2012, he made a face turn after Rondón insulted his father, which resulted in the entirety of Zona 101, led by Cotto, joining him and becoming part of Team IWA.

In 2014, Pérez returned to the World Wrestling Council after a 20-year absence. Pérez showing a considerable amount of weight lost and in great shape joined Ray González in his feud against Savio Vega. He also resumed his feud with Slash Venom in WWC.

In 2022, Miguel Perez's daughter, Nathalya Pérez made her pro wrestling debut. She began her training and debuted at the Espíritu Pro Wrestling Dojo in Puerto Rico. Being also the granddaughter of Jose Miguel Pérez Sr., made her the first Puerto Rican female third generation professional wrestler.

== Championships and accomplishments ==
- Dominican Wrestling Entertainment
  - DWE World Tag Team Championship (1 time) - with Savio Vega
- Espiritu Pro Wrestling Dojo
  - EPWD Tag Team Championship (1 time) - with Jose Burgos
- International Wrestling Association
  - IWA World Heavyweight Championship (1 time)
  - IWA World Tag Team Championship (14 times) - with Huracán Castillo (7), Ricky Banderas, Pain, Fidel Sierra (1) as Los Intocables, Gran Apolo (1), Savio Vega (2), Slash Venom (1), Abyss (2), and Bison Smith (1)
  - IWA Hardcore Championship (2 times)
  - IWA Caribbean Heavyweight Championship (1 time)
- Independent Wrestling Association Florida
  - IWA Florida Tag Team Championship (1 time) - with Savio Vega
- Evolution Wrestling Alliance
- EWA Americas Championship (1 time)
- Pro Wrestling Illustrated
  - PWI ranked him #137 of the top 500 singles wrestlers in the PWI 500 in 1993
- World Wrestling Council
  - WWC North American Heavyweight Championship (1 time)
  - WWC Caribbean Heavyweight Championship (4 times)
  - WWC Puerto Rico Heavyweight Championship (2 times)
  - WWC Caribbean Tag Team Championship (6 times) - with Huracán Castillo Jr.
  - WWC North American Tag Team Championship (3 times) – with Huracán Castillo Jr. (1), Big Red (1), and Tony Atlas (1)
  - WWC World Tag Team Championship (4 times) – with Huracán Castillo Jr.
  - WWC Television Championship (1 time)
- Wrestling Observer Newsletter
  - Worst Feud of the Year (1997) – vs. Disciples of Apocalypse

=== Luchas de Apuestas record ===
Winner (wager)	Loser (wager)	Location	Event	Date	Notes
Miguel Pérez Jr. (hair)	Super Black Ninja (hair)	Bayamon, Puerto Rico	WWC Live event	April 1988	
Miguel Pérez Jr. and Huracan Castillo (hair)	Dan Kroffat and Bobby Jaggers (hair)	Bayamon, Puerto Rico	WWC Live event	September 10, 1988	
Emilio Charles Jr. (hair)	Miguel Pérez Jr. (hair)	Mexico City	CMLL show	October 14, 1994	
Miguel Pérez Jr. (hair)	Silver King (hair)	Mexico City	CMLL 62nd Anniversary Show	September 22, 1995	
Apolo Dantes (hair)	Miguel Pérez Jr. (hair)	Mexico City	CMLL show	October 13, 1995	
