= Powerbomb =

Professional wrestling tactic

An animated example of a powerbomb

A powerbomb is a professional wrestling throw in which an opponent is lifted (usually so that they are sitting on the wrestler's shoulders) and then slammed back-first down to the mat. The standard powerbomb sees an opponent first placed in a standing headscissors position (bent forward with their head placed between the attacking wrestler's thighs). The opponent is then lifted on the wrestler's shoulders and slammed down back-first to the mat. A prawn hold is commonly used for a pinning powerbomb.

Powerbombs are sometimes used in mixed martial arts competitions, when a fighter attempts to slam another fighter who has him trapped in a triangle choke. In professional wrestling, it is also sometimes used by a bigger wrestler as a counter to an attempted hurricanrana by a smaller wrestler. While it was associated with super-heavyweight wrestlers, the move was invented by Lou Thesz.

== Variations ==
=== Argentine powerbomb ===
The wrestler first places their opponent face-up across their shoulders, as in an Argentine backbreaker rack, hooks the head with one hand and a leg with the other, and the wrestler will then spin the opponent's head away from them, dropping the opponent down to the mat. Often the wrestler drops to a seated position while spinning the opponent. Innovated by Lioness Asuka, who called it the Towerhacker Bomb and popularized by AJ Styles as the Rack Bomb.

=== Crucifix powerbomb ===
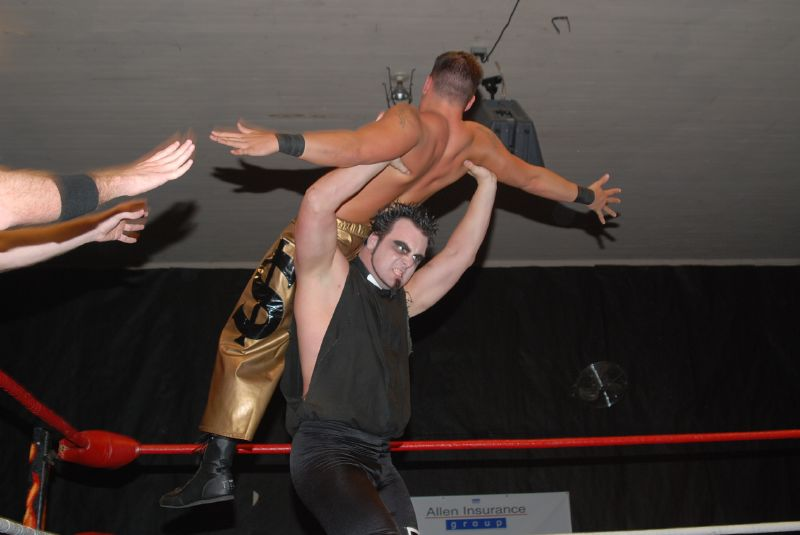
Mikael Judas performing El Crucifijo on Pendleton

The wrestler places the opponent's head in between their legs, then grabs the opponent's stomach, lifts the opponent over their shoulder, and holds both their arms in a cross position over their head. The wrestler finally runs or falls to their knees and throws the opponent onto the mat back and neck first. Sheamus employs the running variation, dubbing it the Celtic Cross or High Cross. The falling variation is often associated with Razor Ramon, who popularized the move; calling it the Razor's Edge (also known as the Outsider's Edge or Diamond Death Drop during his time in WCW as Scott Hall and Diamond Studd respectively). Hall also (though rarely) used a version of this move with the opponent positioned on the second rope away from him. Damian Priest uses the move as a tribute to Hall. The throwing variation is used by Bad Luck Fale who calls it the Bad Luck Fall, Hernandez who calls it the Border Toss, and Ethan Page who calls it the Ego’s Edge.

==== Sitout crucifix powerbomb ====
Also known as a Niagara Driver, Splash Mountain Bomb, or Black Tiger Bomb, this powerbomb is similar to the crucifix powerbomb, but instead of the wrestler falling forward to drop the opponent, the attacking wrestler falls to a seated position for a pinfall attempt instead of releasing the opponent. Innovated by Kyoko Inoue and popularized by Black Tiger. A top rope version was used by Konnan as well. It is used by Roman Reigns as a signature move.

=== Dangan bomb ===
This move, invented by Masato Tanaka, is performed when the wrestler will put the opponent in to the position for a belly to back suplex, lift them up and then catch them in mid air as if going for a spinebuster but instead put the opponents legs on their shoulders then drives the opponent to the mat like a falling powerbomb.

=== Multiple powerbomb ===
Due to convenience of wording, this name can refer to a maneuver either performed by two persons on one, or one person on two; generally both opponents will be far smaller than the wrestler attempting the move. One opponent is placed on the attackers shoulders as per a standard powerbomb, then the other will be placed on the first opponents shoulders, facing in the same direction. This is normally performed by putting the first opponent's head between the seconds legs while they are sitting on the second or top turnbuckle. Finally, both opponents will be slammed to the mat. A variation this move is called triple powerbomb, and it is performed by three wrestlers. Two wrestlers lift an opponent with a belly-to-back hold and place the opponent's legs on the third partner's shoulders, who executes the powerbomb while the other two push the opponent from the carrying partner's shoulders. There is also an avalanche variation of this move performed from the middle rope. This was popularized by The Shield in WWE.

=== Double underhook powerbomb ===
Also known as a Tiger driver or Tiger bomb. The wrestler faces a bent over opponent, and hooks each of the opponent's arms behind the opponent's back. The wrestler then lifts the opponent in the air and flips them over, throwing them back down and driving the back and shoulders of the opponent to the ground. The wrestler may also fall to their knees as they slam the opponent down. A sitout version is commonly known as a Tiger Driver and was invented by Mitsuharu Misawa. Ahmed Johnson used the sitout version as well, calling it the Pearl River Plunge. Tyler Bate uses the move as his finishing maneuver, calling it the Tyler Driver '97 and Toni Storm calling it Storm Zero.

==== Double underhook leg-hook sitout powerbomb ====
The wrestler begins by standing behind the opponent. They then hook both of the opponent's arm with whichever one free arm behind and across their back, their hand grabbing the opponent's far wrist/arm/hand. The wrestler using their other hand to reach up, over, and across the upper back to the opponent's neck to turn them around and bend the forwards in front of them while keeping both their arms into an underhook under the same arm. The wrestler then bends forwards using their free hand to grab the opponent's leg at the knee pit to lift the up, flip them forwards, and fall into a seated position to slam them down. Cole Radrick, who originally innovated the move under the name Lil’ Sebastian’s Curse, uses it as a finisher. Konosuke Takeshita also uses the move as a finisher calling it the Cinnabomb.

==== Kneeling double underhook powerbomb ====
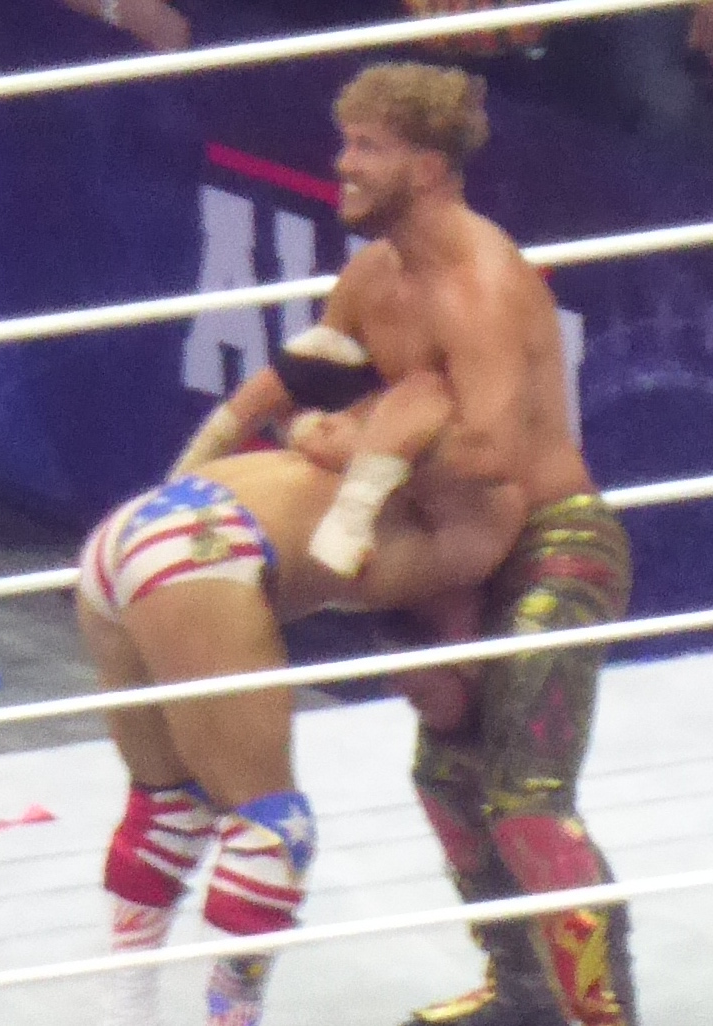
Will Ospreay performing the Tiger Driver '91 on MJF

Another variation commonly credited to Mitsuharu Misawa but actually innovated by Joshi wrestling legend Jaguar Yokota. In this version, the wrestler keeps the arm hooks applied during the entire move, causing their opponent to land on their head, neck, and shoulders. Misawa popularized the move as Tiger Driver '91. The name refers to the January 29, 1991 match in which Misawa debuted the maneuver against Akira Taue. Masahiro Chono used it as finishing move on rare occasions, most famously used to win the first ever G1 Climax. After Misawa's death in 2009, the move was effectively retired until Kota Ibushi notably used it in the 2019 New Japan Cup against Tetsuya Naito. In 2023, Will Ospreay began using it as a finisher and briefly renamed it to the Storm Driver '93. It is rarely attempted due to the dangerous nature and risk factor of the move.

=== Elevated powerbomb ===
This move is similar to a standard powerbomb. Instead of slamming the opponent directly on the mat from the shoulders, the attacking wrestler first lifts the opponent even higher by holding onto the opponent and extending their arms up, lifting the opponent up off the shoulders of the attacking wrestler just moments before slamming them down to the mat. This move was used prominently by The Undertaker, who named it the Last Ride. A sitout version is used by Kota Ibushi, who calls it the Golden Star Bomb, and a pop up variation is used by Keith Lee, who calls it the Spirit Bomb as a homage to Dragon Ball Z.

=== Falling powerbomb ===
This move starts by lifting an opponent like a normal powerbomb, but when the opponent is on the wrestler's shoulders the wrestler falls forward, slamming the opponent onto the ground. This move was popularized by Kane.

=== Fireman's carry powerbomb ===
The wrestler lifts the opponent onto their shoulders, into the fireman's carry position. The wrestler grabs hold of the opponent's near leg with one hand, and their head with the other, then pushes the opponent's upper body up and simultaneously spins them, causing them to end up in front of the wrestler face up. The wrestler then either sits down or stays standing. They may also wrap their hands around the opponent's upper legs.

=== Folding powerbomb ===
The move sees the wrestler lifts the opponent and drops them on the mat, while sliding forward and lifts his legs off the mat, putting his full body weight on top of the wrestler and thus pinning their shoulders more firmly against the mat. Popularized by Genichiro Tenryu, Toshiaki Kawada and recently Gunther. Samoa Joe used this to transition into a number of submission holds.

=== Ganso bomb ===
Translated literally from Japanese as Originator Bomb (元祖 ganso), but in English more commonly referred to as the original powerbomb, this move sees the attacking wrestler make an opponent bend over and grab them in a belly to back waistlock before then lifting the opponent until they are vertical. The attacking wrestler then drives the opponent down on their neck and shoulder while either remaining in a standing position, sitting position or dropping down to their knees. The move is considered one of the most dangerous moves in professional wrestling as the person taking the move is in freefall, dropped onto their own head or neck without protection. It was invented by Lou Thesz and popularized by Toshiaki Kawada as the Kawada Driver. AJ Styles used during his tenure with New Japan Pro-Wrestling as the Hollow Point. Brody King uses this move as a finisher in AEW, called the "Gonzo Bomb" as a tribute to his trainer Joey Kaos. Brock Lesnar inadvertently used the move on Hardcore Holly in an accident on 2002 resulting in an injury to Holly's neck that put him out of action for 13 months.

=== Gutwrench powerbomb ===
This move involves a wrestler standing over a bent over opponent, locking their arms around the opponent's waist and lifting them up, flipping them over, and slamming them down to the mat back first. The difference compared to a regular powerbomb is that the opponent's head does not go between the wrestler's thighs, instead they remain slightly in front or to the side of the wrestler. The falling variation was used by Jack Swagger as the Swagger Bomb. "Dr. Death" Steve Williams popularized the sitout variation, naming it the Doctor Bomb. Kenny Omega also uses the sitout variation as the Dr. Willy Bomb.

=== Inverted powerbomb ===
Also known as an Inverted front powerslam, this move sees the attacking wrestler faces a bent-over opponent and apply a gutwrench waistlock before lifting the opponent up so they are lying across the wrestler's shoulder, facing upward, with the wrestler maintaining the waistlock to hold them in position, known as an overhead gutwrench backbreaker rack. The wrestler then falls forward, standing or into a sitout position while flipping the opponent forward, driving the opponent horizontally belly-down into the ground. A double underhook version of this move also exists. Ron Simmons made the standing variation famous, calling it the Dominator, Bobby Lashley utilized a kneeling version as a finisher, while Yujiro Takahashi popularized the sitout version, calling it Tokyo Pimps. Ricky Saints uses a sitout side version called the Roshambo.

=== Kneeling powerbomb ===
This variation of a powerbomb is similar to an ordinary powerbomb, however, instead of the wrestler remaining standing, the wrestler falls into a kneeling position while driving the opponent back-first into the mat.

=== Repeated powerbomb ===
As the name implies, the wrestler performing the move will do so multiple times. To start, they will lift the opponent into powerbomb position and perform the move. Without letting go of the opponent's waist, the wrestler raises them up again and drops them. Depending on the wrestler, they may continue to repeat the process and may pin the opponent after the last one. Although neither wrestler does this anymore, Chris Jericho and Brock Lesnar used the multiple powerbomb as a signature maneuver when they debuted in WWE; Jericho's version was a double and Lesnar's a triple although some times a double.

AEW wrestler Wardlow uses a unique take on this sequence. Instead, he simply powerbombs the opponent, picks them up from the mat, and powerbombs them again for each separate time as needed to defeat them. He refers to this as the Powerbomb Symphony.

=== Pop-up powerbomb ===
As the name implies, this move begins with the opponent rushing towards the attacker who then flings the opponent vertically up into the air. The move is finished by catching the opponent and performing a powerbomb. This move was popularized by Kevin Owens and Scott Steiner. Oba Femi uses this move as a finisher, named the Fall From Grace.

=== Release powerbomb ===
More colloquially known as the Jackknife powerbomb, a variation of the powerbomb where the opponent is lifted into the air and then dropped without being forced into a pin.

Kevin Nash, Big Van Vader, Bubba Ray Dudley, Chris Benoit, Sycho Sid, Lita, Sara Del Rey, John Bradshaw Layfield and Sable use this move. Raquel Rodriguez uses a one-arm version of the move itself, calling it the Chingona/Texana Bomb.

==== Corner sit-out powerbomb ====
Also called an Alley Oop, the opponent begins sitting in the corner of the ring and facing outwards, while holding on to the ring ropes. The wrestler takes hold of the opponent by the legs and pulls them upwards and backwards with a twist, falling into a sitting position as they do so. The move ends with the opponent's back on the ground and their legs over the shoulders of the wrestler, placing the opponent in a pinning predicament.

=== Running powerbomb ===
In this variation of the powerbomb, the wrestler runs before they releases the opponent. A wrestler may also sit down for a pinfall attempt.

=== Schoolboy powerbomb ===
The moves sees the attacking wrestler drop down behind the opponent and put one arm up between the opponent's legs to pull the opponent over the attacking wrestler so that they fall flat on their back. The wrestler, while still holding the opponent, then stands up to using their free hand to either place it on the opponent's back or the grab their own wrist to aid themselves in lifting the opponent off of their back upwards to then slam them back down onto the mat. The wrestler may slam the opponent while standing, dropping to one or both knees, or sitting out. Giovanni Vinci and Roman Reigns are users of this move with Reigns using the sitout version.

=== Scoop lift powerbomb ===
In this variation of a powerbomb an opponent is first scooped so they are horizontal across an attacking wrestler's chest. The wrestler then pushes the opponent up and turns them, so that they are sitting on the shoulders of the wrestler, before then slamming them down in a powerbomb motion. A seated version is also possible. This maneuver was occasionally performed by "The Alpha Male" Monty Brown and was referred to as the Alpha Bomb. Raquel Rodriguez uses a one arm version of the powerbomb known initially as the Chingona Bomb, now dubbed the Texana Bomb.

=== Sit-out powerbomb ===
In this variation of a powerbomb, the attacking wrestler falls to a seated position as they slam the opponent down. Some wrestlers remain in seated position to pin the opponent, while others choose not to. The move can either be performed as a standard powerbomb or as a gutwrench powerbomb. The move was popularized by Jushin Liger, who used a high angle version dropping the opponent on the upper shoulders instead of the back as a finisher, known as the Liger Bomb, and was also famously used by Batista as the Batista Bomb.

=== Slingshot powerbomb ===
From a position in which the opponent is sitting across the wrestlers shoulder, the attacker bounces the opponent's back across the top rope. The attacker then spins around, using the momentum to powerbomb the opponent. This move is used by Dax Harwood and The Miz.

=== Spinning powerbomb ===
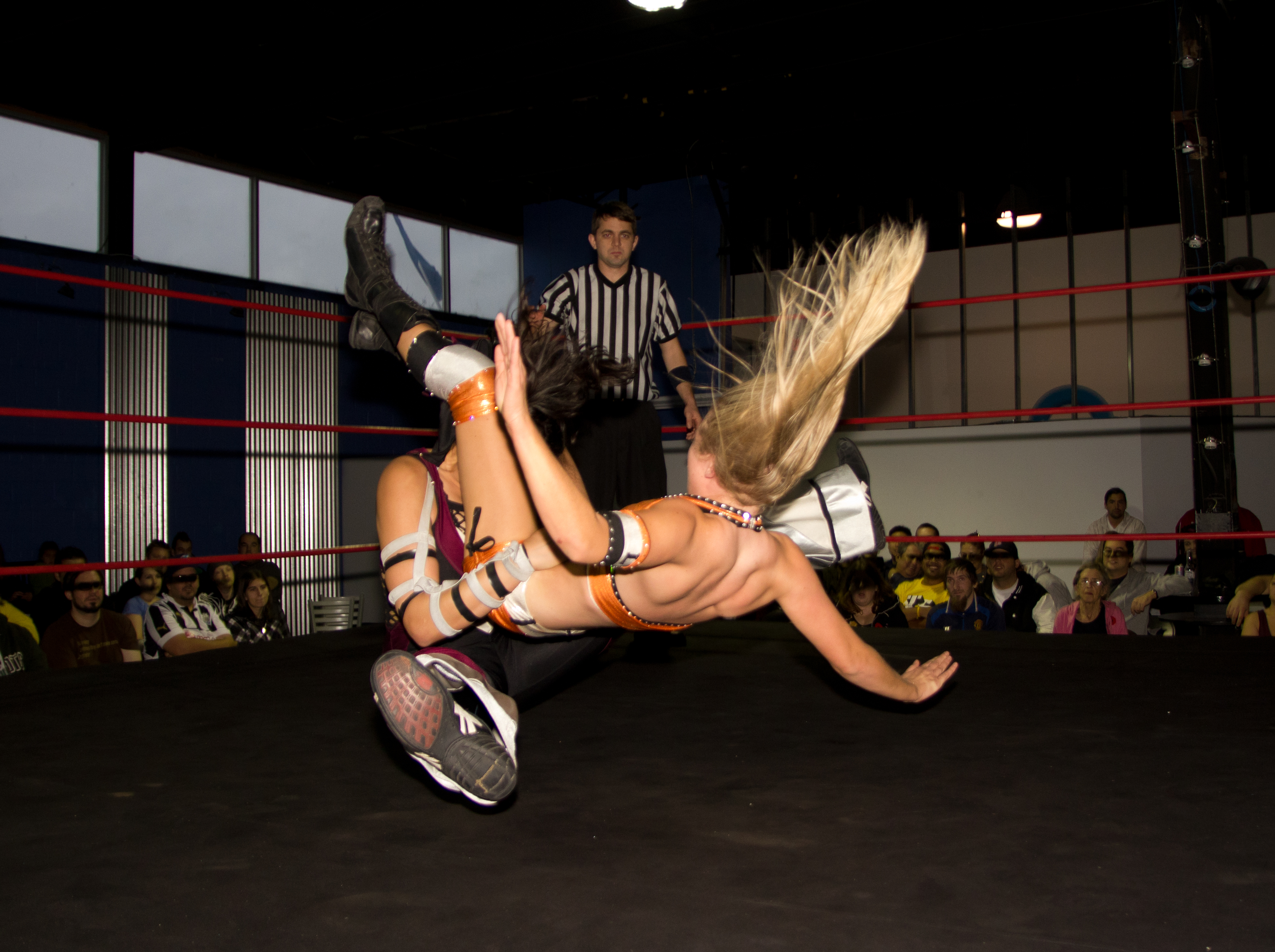
Vanessa Kraven performing a spinning sit-down powerbomb on Leah von Dutch

Also called a spiral bomb. The wrestler lifts the opponent up onto their shoulders and spins around several rotations before sitting down and slamming the opponent down to the mat, as in a sitout powerbomb. A release variation sees the wrestler remain standing or kneeling and just throwing the opponent away from them onto their back to the mat. A gutwrench variation is also possible, with the wrestler dropping the opponent as in a normal gutwrench powerbomb. This maneuver was used by Diamond Dallas Page, but the sitout variation was popularized by Michael Elgin, who adopted it as his finisher as the Elgin Bomb.

=== Spin-out powerbomb ===
Also known as a Blue Thunder Driver or a Blue Thunder Bomb, this is a belly-to-back powerbomb, usually beginning in the back suplex position in which the wrestler stands behind their opponent and puts their head under the arm of the opponent. They then lift the opponent up using one arm around the waist of the opponent and another under their legs. The wrestler then spins the opponent around 180°, dropping them to the mat back first as they drop to a sitting position. Invented by Jun Akiyama, it is used as a signature move by Sami Zayn, as well as Konosuke Takeshita. Apollo Crews uses a toss variation of the move. John Cena uses a kneeling variation of the move, dubbing it the Protobomb.

=== Straight jacket powerbomb ===
Also known as a pyramid driver, this move can be executed when a wrestler lifts the opponent on the shoulders between the legs, but crossing the both arms during his bent-over position before, and drops on the mat with a seated position to set up a pin. It was used by Super Crazy with the name called Crazy Bomb and by Claudio Castagnoli in a sit-out variation called the Ricola Bomb.

=== Sunset flip powerbomb ===
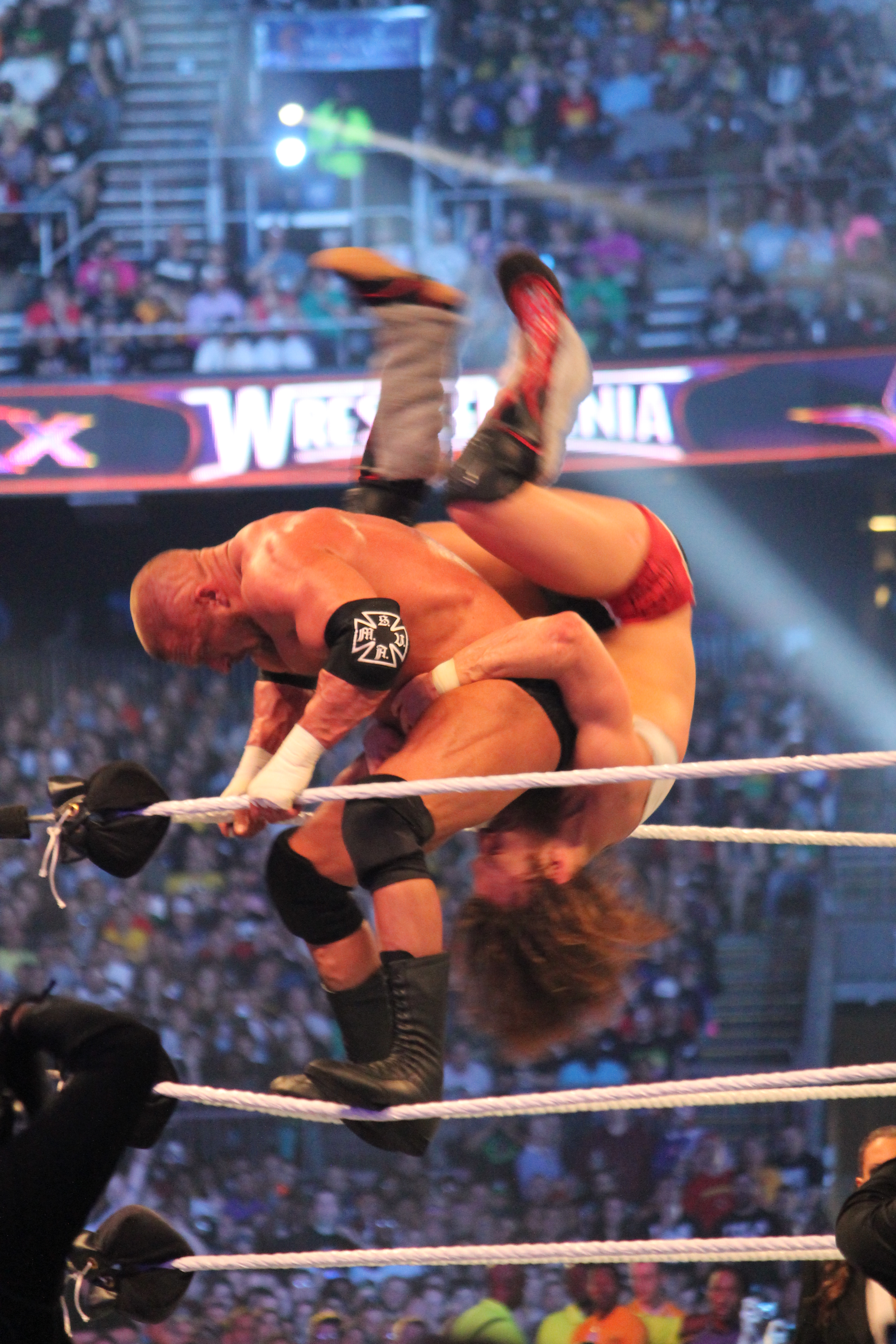
Daniel Bryan performs a sunset flip superbomb to Triple H at WrestleMania XXX.

This move sees the wrestler bend over and place their opponent in a standing head scissors. However, the wrestler moves forward slightly so the opponent's midsection is between the wrestler's thighs instead of their head. The wrestler wraps their arms around the opponent's midsection in a waistlock, then jumps and rolls forward, under the opponent's legs, and into a seated position, forcing the opponent to fall back to the mat. The resulting position can lead to a sitout pin. This is often called a Yoshi Tonic in Japan or Code Red in America, the latter name coined by Amazing Red, and would since be used as a signature move by Mercedes Moné who refers to the move as the Code Blue, notably from 2019 to 2021 during her time in WWE as Sasha Banks, and as finishers by Zelina Vega and Roxanne Perez, the latter referring to the move as Pop Rox (formerly known as Pop Rok during her time in the independent circuit and in Ring Of Honor as Rok-C). The top rope version is also used sometimes, as seen in the picture above. The move is also very dangerous, because when the wrestler flips over the opponent's back, if they put too much downward force on their legs, it could result in a leg injury. Seth Rollins was injured while attempting to perform a sunset flip powerbomb by applying too much downward force on his leg, thus injuring it. An avalanche leg trap variation is used by Hirooki Goto on rare occasions as Kaiten.

=== Superbomb ===
The attacking wrestler forces the opponent to ascend to the top rope, standing usually on the top ropes with their legs spread. The wrestler then bends the opponent, placing their head between the wrestler's thighs. The wrestler then wraps their hands around the opponent's waist. The wrestler then lifts the opponent up, flipping them over, while jumping forward. The opponent falls down to the mat back first, and the wrestler usually falls to their knees or to a sitting position. This variation was popularized by Chris Candido as the Blonde Bombshell, while Bubba Ray Dudley used a sit-out version.

Another variation sees the opponent sitting on the top rope. The wrestler climbs up to the top rope and stands facing the opponent. The wrestler then bends the opponent over and takes hold of opponent around the waist. The wrestler then flips the opponent up and over so they are sitting on the shoulders of the wrestler. At the same time, the wrestler spins around 180° and leaps forward, falling to the ground in a standing or sitting position and driving the opponent's back and shoulders to the mat or can jump backwards away from the turnbuckle to drop into a seated position.

Another variant of the Superbomb was popularized by B. J. Whitmer, who used the move to toss himself and fellow wrestler Jimmy Jacobs into a crowd at a Ring of Honor show in June 2006.

=== Tilt-a-whirl powerbomb ===
The attacking wrestler stands facing the opponent, who is often charging at the attacker, before bending the opponent down so they are bent in front of the attacking wrestler as he/she stands over them then the wrestler reaches around the opponent's body and lifts them up, spinning the opponent in front of the wrestler's body. As the wrestler brings the opponent back down to the mat, the wrestler kneels, slamming the opponent onto the mat.

=== Thunder fire powerbomb ===
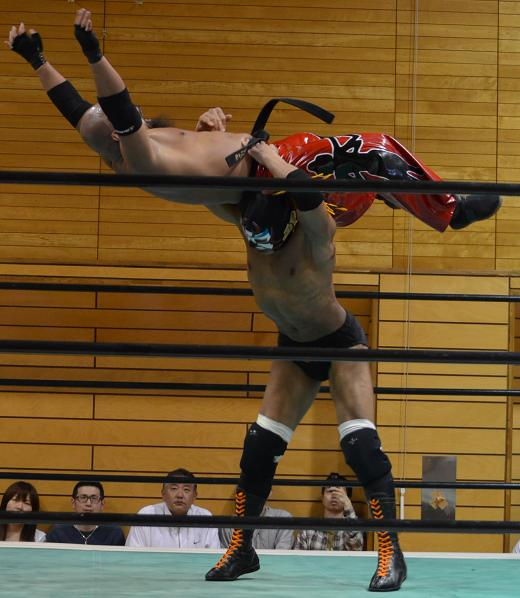
The Great Sasuke performing a thunder fire powerbomb

The wrestler faces a bent opponent and places them in the standing headscissors position (bent forward with their head placed between the wrestler's thighs). The wrestler then grabs hold around the opponent's upper torso or waist, and lifts them on top of one of the wrestler's shoulders on their back. The wrestler then bends forward and slams the opponent down to the mat on their back or shoulders. It is also known as an Over-the-shoulder powerbomb or a One shoulder powerbomb. Innovated by the Great Nita (Atsushi Onita). The late Mike Awesome used the standing, a running, and kneeling versions of this move as finishers, collectively dubbed Awesome Bomb. Sid Vicious also used the kneeling version of this move as a finisher early in his career and would often drop his opponents off to his side instead of forwards.

=== Turnbuckle powerbomb ===
Also known as the buckle bomb. This move sees the wrestler faces a standing opponent, bends them forwards, takes a hold around their waist and then flips the opponent up and over so the opponent is sitting on the wrestler's shoulders. The wrestler then faces a corner of the ring and throws the opponent into the corner, driving the back and neck of the opponent to the turnbuckle. The move was famously used by Kenta Kobashi and Seth Rollins. The move is considered to be dangerous if done wrong, which led to Sting temporarily retiring from wrestling (he has since returned to the ring since 2020 with AEW) and Finn Bálor injuring his shoulder in 2016. WWE banned it in 2020 after Nia Jax botched the move on Kairi Sane. However, in recent years, Seth Rollins has continued to use the move semi-regularly, with Balór also using it against Rollins at Summerslam 2023, suggesting that WWE may have lifted the ban.

=== Snap powerbomb ===
This variation sees a wrestler catching an opponent mid-air or lifting them up in a standard powerbomb, before slamming him to the mat as quickly as possible. It was used as a finisher by Chris Benoit under the name Wild Bomb.

=== Suplex powerbomb ===
The wrestler lifts the opponent upside down as in a vertical suplex and then pushes their upper body forward while sitting down, ending the move in the same position as the sitout powerbomb. A fall-forward and standing versions are also possible. The move was invented by Kenta Kobashi who called it Orange Crush. El Generico used the move with a double pumphandle cradle before delivering the Orange Crush. Jon Moxley and Roderick Strong used the standing version.
