= Sin Cara =

Sin Cara may refer to:

- Místico (born 1982), Mexican professional wrestler, wrestled as Sin Cara in WWE between 2011 and 2013
- Cinta de Oro (born 1977), American professional wrestler, wrestled as Sin Cara in WWE between 2013 and 2019
