= Promociones Gutiérrez 1st Anniversary Show =

Mexican professional wrestling supercard show

- The official poster for the Anniversary show
- Promotion: Consejo Mundial de Lucha Libre / Promociones Gutierrez
- Date: July 12, 2010
- City: Nuevo Laredo, Tamaulipas, Mexico
- Venue: Plaza de Toros Lauro Luis Longoria
- Attendance: Approx. 10,000

Pay-per-view chronology
← Previous; Sin Salida	Next → Infierno en el Ring

The Promociones Gutiérrez 1st Anniversary Show was a professional wrestling supercard event promoted by Consejo Mundial de Lucha Libre (CMLL) and Promociones Gutierrez, CMLL's local promoter in Nuevo Laredo, Tamaulipas, Mexico. The event took place on July 12, 2010 at the Plaza de Toros Lauro Luis Longoria bullring and commemorated the 1st anniversary of Promociones Gutierrez. The focal point of the event was a Ruleta de la Muerte (Spanish for "Roulette of Death") tournament, in which five teams of Parejas Incredibles (teams of enemies) participate in an elimination match to see which team would have to face off in a Lucha de Apuestas, mask vs. mask match. The team of Místico and El Oriental lost the Ruleta de la Muerte and was forced to wrestle each other immediately after the Ruleta match. In the end Místico defeated El Oriental to unmask him.

The most notable event of the show was not a wrestling match, but the appearance of Dr. Wagner Jr. after the fourth match of the evening. Dr. Wagner Jr. worked for CMLL's main rival Asistencia Asesoría y Administración (AAA) at the time and held their AAA Mega Championship. He wore the championship belt during the surprise appearance at the CMLL event, making it at least seem like he had left AAA with the belt. After the show Dr. Wagner Jr. denied being on bad terms with AAA, although he did not actually have a contract with them.

== Background ==
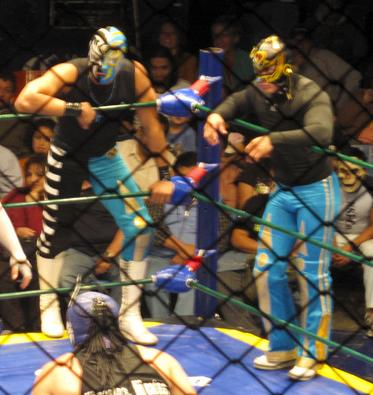
La Sombra (left) and Volador Jr. (right), two of the ten competitors in the main event

On April 12, 2010 a contingent of former Asistencia Asesoría y Administración (AAA) wrestlers including Psicosis, Histeria, Maniaco, El Alebrije and Cuije appeared on a Consejo Mundial de Lucha Libre (CMLL) show in Puebla, Puebla. The group drove into the arena in a black SUV and attacked La Sombra, El Hijo del Fantasma and La Máscara after they had just finished wrestling. Brazo de Plata, Místico and Jon Strongman tried to help out but were kept away by CMLL rudos Averno, El Texano Jr. and El Terrible. Following the attack, the former AAA wrestlers returned to the SUV and left the arena. This was the first appearance of a group who would later be known as Los Invasores ("The Invaders") and would expand to include several other wrestlers who had once worked for AAA but now worked on the Independent circuit. The "war" between CMLL and the independent wrestlers built for months, adding such wrestlers as Cien Caras, Universo 2000, Mr. Águila and Olímpico to the group. In May former AAA wrestler El Oriental appeared on a Promociones Gutiérrez in Nuevo Laredo, working opposite several CMLL wrestlers including Místico. At first it appeared that El Oriental was just working for Promociones Gutiérrez and not CMLL, but when Oriental started a storyline feud with Místico it soon became clear he not only worked for CMLL but also was part of the Invaders storyline.

In June, 2010 the card for a special show to commemorate the first anniversary of Promociones Gutiérrez was announced, a show with a "CMLL vs. Invaders" theme running through all the matches announced. The main event was a 10-man, 5-team Ruleta de la Muerte match which meant that at the end of the night one man would be unmasked. Four of the teams consisted of a CMLL wrestler and an "Invasor" teaming up, while the fifth team featured two longtime CMLL rivals. Each team was put together from either ongoing storylines with Místico and El Oriental as the first team announced. They also paired up Invasor Histeria with CMLL wrestler La Sombra, Invasor El Alebrije and CMLL wrestler Volador Jr. The teaming of Invasor Olímpico and CMLL wrestler Atlantis had a longer history than the previous pairings as Olímpico used to be part of Los Guerreros de la Atlantida, Atlantis' CMLL fraction but had left the company in 2008. Olímpico had returned as one of the Invaders in May, 2010. This was the only team without an ongoing rivalry, but instead built off their history. The fifth and final team was an all-CMLL team of Averno and Último Guerrero, who as leaders of the two top rudo (bad guy) factions, Los Hijos del Averno and Los Guerreros de la Atlantida had been rivals for years.

Many wrestling magazines predicted that El Oriental and Místico were the odds on favorites to end up as the last team, citing the fact that El Oriental's career was slowing down due to injuries. In one interview Averno stated that he was 100% confident that his team would not be forced to wrestle each other, while he did not like Último Guerrero, they were the only all-CMLL team and that they would put their differences aside for one night. Atlantis claimed that while he did not like the fact that Olímpico had returned as part of Los Invasores, they did have extensive experience as a team which would help ensure they were not forced to put their masks on the line, but if they did he'd be happy to unmask Olímpico.

The announced card included five other matches, all with a "CMLL vs. Outsiders" theme to it, four of the five with a "CMLL vs. Los Invasores" and one featuring the long-running "Mexico vs. Japan" storyline that CMLL had been promoting. The Mexico vs. Japan match, the semi-main event of the show, was scheduled to feature Los Renegados (El Terrible and El Texano Jr.), who had been a part of the "Mexico vs. Japan" storyline over the fall and winter of 2009, team up with Héctor Garza. While Garza was announced as the co-leader of Los Invasores he spent more time teaming with CMLL wrestlers, especially El Terrible and El Texano Jr. since turning Rudo in May, 2010. Their opponents were La Ola Amarilla ("The Yellow Wave"), a group of Japanese wrestlers that included CMLL regular Okumura and which ever Japanese wrestlers were currently working for CMLL either full-time or touring. Nobuo Yoshihashi was a rookie sent to Mexico by New Japan Pro-Wrestling (NJPW) on a learning tour to improve his skills and had teamed with Okumura on a regular basis since coming to Mexico. The team was rounded out by NJPW's Jushin Thunder Liger, a light heavyweight wrestling legend who had been touring with CMLL since June.

The fourth match of the show was scheduled to feature three wrestlers who had never worked for CMLL, but were not considered part of Los Invasores. The team consisted of second, or third generation wrestlers all sons of famous Luchadors as El Hijo de L.A. Park (Son of L.A. Park), El Hijo de Dr. Wagner Jr. (The son of Dr. Wagner Jr.) and El Hijo de Solitario (the son of El Solitario) would team up and face the CMLL trio of La Máscara, Máscara Dorada and Valiente. The booking of Hijo de L.A. Park and Hijo de Dr. Wagner Jr. was a bit of a surprise as both their fathers work for CMLL's biggest competitor in Mexico AAA. This was the first time either of these young wrestlers had worked for CMLL and it was the biggest show for either up until this point.

The third match of the night would see Rey Bucanero and Los Hijos del Averno representatives Ephesto and Mephisto take on the co-leader of Los Invasores (with Héctor Garza), Mr. Águila. Mr. Águila teamed up with Charly Manson and Juventud Guerrera, two wrestlers who had worked extensively for AAA up until 2009. Neither Manson nor Guerrera were under contract with CMLL but were hired by the local promoter of the event. Most of Los Invasores were actually signed with CMLL despite the storyline making it look otherwise.

The promoter teased a "Mystery woman" in the second match, to team with "Outsiders" Rossy Moreno and Sexy Flor, hinting that the wrestler was a AAA wrestler who was leaving the promotion. The team were scheduled to face two of CMLL's most prominent female wrestlers in Lady Apache and Marcela who would team up with the newcomer Lluvia for the match. It was not specified if these women would be part of Los Invasores going forward or if it was just for the show on July 12.

The opening match featured the Mini-Estrella division as for the first time a "Mini Invaders" team was put together. The team was led by Mini Alebrije (formerly Cuije) who teamed up with Mini Oriental and Mini Cibernético. The inclusion of Mini Oriental was not a great surprise, the "normal sized" Oriental was wrestling in the main event, but the inclusion of Mini Cibernético was a surprise, especially since the "regular sized" Cibernético was one of AAA's top tecnicos (good guys). The "Mini Invasores" would face a trio of CMLL Mini-Estrellas in Astral, Mascarita Dorada and Shockercito.

On the day of the show Super Luchas magazine's website posted a story that a "Surprise wrestler" would appear at the Nuevo Laredo show and indicated that they were not talking about the unnamed woman in the second match of the show but claimed it would be "controversial". Only 4 hours before the opening bell Box y Lucha Magazine reported that Dr. Wagner Jr. had been spotted in Nuevo Laredo, leading to speculations about whether he was there just to see his son or if he had actually left AAA and would appear on the show that night.

== Event ==
The opening match was the first CMLL appearance for two of the three Mini Invasores as neither Mini Cibernético nor Mini Oriental had worked for the company before this time and may not work for CMLL full-time as they were hired by the local promoter in Nuevo Laredo. The Mini Invaders took on the tecnico (good guy) team of Astral, Mascarita Dorada and Shockercito. The Mini Invaders won the match when Mini Cibernético took advantage of the referee being distracted to pull off Mascarita Dorada's mask and pinned him before Mascarita Dorada had a chance to react.

The theme of "CMLL vs. the Invaders" continued in the second match as CMLL regulars Lady Apache, Lluvia and Marcela face "outsiders" Rossy Moreno and Sexy Flor, who previously worked for AAA and currently work on the independent circuit and a surprise partner that was not named before the event. Their surprise partner turned out to be Tiffany, who up until July 12 had worked for AAA and was a former multi-time AAA Reina de Reinas ("Queen of Queens") tournament winner. The match ended with a disqualification when on eof the invaders got caught while pulling Lluvia's mask off her.

The third match of the night saw the reunion of Charly Manson, Juventud Guerrera and Mr. Águila, who had worked as "the X-Team" in AAA in the early 2000s. Mr. Águila was one of the leaders of "the Invaders" and worked full-time for CMLL while Charly Manson and Juventud Guerrera had not worked for CMLL prior to this event but on the independent circuit and were brought in by the local promoter for the specific show. The former X-Team took on Rey Bucanero and Los Hijos del Averno representatives Ephesto and Mephisto. During the match Mephisto seemed to hurt his knee after landing on it wrong and had to quickly tag out to Ephesto. The CMLL team (Bucanero, Ephesto and Mephisto) won the match by disqualification through a bit of trickery by Ephesto. While the referee was looking the other way he intentionally removed his own mask and threw it to one of his opponents. When the referee noticed his opponent holding Ephesto's mask he mistakenly disqualified Manson, Guerrera and Mr. Águila.

=== Dr. Wagner Jr. appearance ===
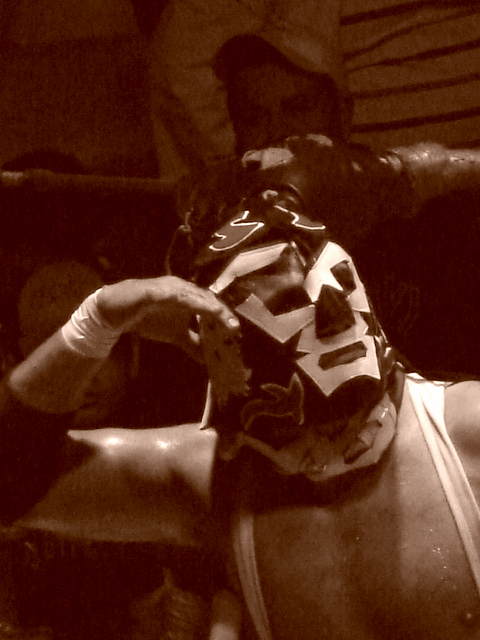
Dr. Wagner Jr. who made a surprise appearance.

The fourth match of the evening was supposed to feature El Hijo del Solitario teaming up with El Hijo de L.A. Park and El Hijo del Dr. Wagner Jr. but he was replaced by Scorpio Jr. without any explanations given. The sons of famous wrestlers faced the CMLL tecnico team of CMLL World Trios Champion La Máscara who teamed with triple champion (CMLL World Super Lightweight Champion, Mexican National Trios Champion and CMLL World Trios Champion) Mascara Dorada and Mexican National Welterweight Champion Valiente to continue the "CMLL vs. Outsiders" theme of the night. None of the Juniors worked for CMLL at this time. The teams split the first two falls between them and in the final fall Scorpio Jr. drew a disqualification for landing a low blow on La Máscara and subsequently unmasking him in front of the referee.

After the match both Scorpio Jr. and Hijo de L.A. Park attacked Hijo de Dr. Wagner Jr. which brought out the surprise of the night as his father, Dr. Wagner Jr. came to the ring to save him from the attack. Dr. Wagner Jr. came out in full wrestling gear, with the AAA Mega Championship belt strapped around his waist to the surprise of everyone in attendance. After running off his son's attackers he posed in the ring with his son, followed by him circling the ring to allow the front row to get a closer look at him. Dr. Wagner Jr. did not make any announcements or comments during his appearance, just posing with his son and interacting with the fans before leaving the arena.

The fifth match of the night was the only one not to feature the "CMLL vs. Ex-AAA" storyline, instead it was a continuation of a long-running "Mexico vs. Japan" storyline that CMLL had been working since the summer of 2009. Héctor Garza, El Terrible and El Texano Jr. represented Mexico as they took on La Ola Amarilla (Jushin Thunder Liger, Okumra and Yoshihashi) in the semi-main event match. In late 2009 Terrible and Texano Jr. had defeated former Ola Amarilla members Yujiro and Naito in a Lucha de Apuesta match, shaving the Japanese duo bald after the match. After a string of disqualifications in the second, third and fourth match the fifth match ended with a pinfall as Garza, Terrible and Texano Jr. defeated La Ola Amarilla.

=== Main event ===
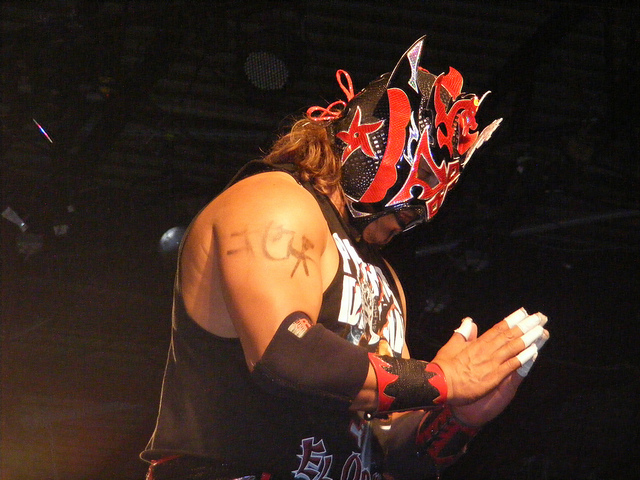
El Oriental wearing the mask he was forced to take off in the main event.

The main event of the night consisted of two parts, first a 10-man, 5-team Ruleta de la Muerte elimination match, followed by a Lucha de Apuesta, mask vs. mask match, between the two members of the last team. This was the match that had drawn over 80% capacity for the 12,500 seat Plaza de Toros Lauro Luis Longoria with the promise of one of the wrestlers being unmasked that night. The teams were eliminated from the match when they pinned an opponent or forced them to submit. While every team was composed of wrestlers that did not generally get along, the teams tried to put their differences aside in order to keep the team from having to risk their masks. The first team to escape the match was the team of La Sombra and Histeria, following shortly by La Sombra's regular partner Volador Jr. and El Alebrije escaping the match. This left three teams in the match until moments later, Averno and Último Guerrero fulfilled the prediction of being the team least likely to lose the match as they were the third team to escape the match. The last portion of the match came down to Místico and El Oriental against Atlantis and Olímpico. Prior to the match Atlantis has stated that as long as he and Olímpico remained on the same page they could not lose, especially since they used to team on a regular basis when Olímpico was part of Los Guerreros de la Atlantida. Atlantis' prognostication came true as he earned the escape for his team by pinning El Oriental.

After a moments respite Místico and El Oriental faced off in a singles match, a match that almost lasted longer than the elimination portion of the Ruleta de la Muerte match. In the end Místico forced El Oriental to submit to his finishing move, the La Mística Fujiwara armbar combo, keeping his mask safe. After the match El Oriental was forced to remove his mask and show his face. He announced that his real name was Noé Astro Moreno Leon, that he was 37 years old and had been wrestling for 18 years at that point in time.

== Aftermath ==
When Dr. Wagner Jr. returned to the locker rooms after his post-match appearance he stated that he was still "on good terms" with AAA, leaving his status of whether or not he actually jumped from AAA to CMLL open for speculation. It was revealed that Wagner had been working for AAA without a contract since May or June, 2010. Dorian Roldan, part of the AAA management team, later commented on Twitter that "I think a war has been declared!" without further explanations on what the comment meant.

After surviving the Ruleta de la Muerte match Histeria was able to put his mask on the line for a second time in the same week as he was one of 12 wrestlers scheduled to participate in the main event of Infierno en el Ring (2010), which is a cage match where the last man in the cage would be forced to unmask.

=== Results ===
No.	Results	Stipulations	Times
1	Los Mini Invasores (Mini Alebrije, Mini Cibernético and Mini Oriental) defeated Astral, Mascarita Dorada and Shockercito	Best two-out-of-three falls six-man "Lucha Libre rules" tag team match	—
2	Lady Apache, Lluvia and Marcela defeated Rossy Moreno, Sexy Flor and Tiffany by disqualification	Best two-out-of-three falls six-man "Lucha Libre rules" tag team match	11:32
3	Rey Bucanero and Los Hijos del Averno (Ephesto and Mephisto) defeated Charly Manson, Juventud Guerrera and Mr. Águila by disqualification	Best two-out-of-three falls six-man "Lucha Libre rules" tag team match	17:17
4	El Hijo de L.A. Park, Hijo de Dr. Wagner and Scorpio Jr. defeated La Máscara, Máscara Dorada and Valiente by disqualification	Best two-out-of-three falls six-man "Lucha Libre rules" tag team match	19:38
5	Héctor Garza and Los Renegados (El Terrible and El Texano Jr.) defeated La Ola Amarilla (Jushin Liger, Okumura and Nobuo Yoshihashi)	Best two-out-of-three falls six-man "Lucha Libre rules" tag team match	12:58
6	Místico and El Oriental lost to Atlantis and Olímpico, Averno and Último Guerrero, El Alebrije and Volador Jr., Histeria and La Sombra	Ruleta de la Muerte elimination match	20:12
7	Místico defeated El Oriental	Lucha de Apuestas, mask vs. mask match	14:45
