= Black Tiger (professional wrestling) =

Professional wrestling character

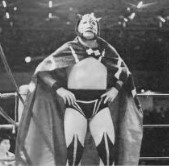
Mark Rocco as Black Tiger in 1982.

Black Tiger (ブラック・タイガー, Burakku Taigā) has been the persona predominantly used by several different professional wrestlers in New Japan Pro-Wrestling as opponents of the four incarnations of Tiger Mask. The character is drawn from the original Japanese Tiger Mask anime. The trademark of the character is to always wear a mask and tights in an almost identical design to that of his perennial rival only with entirely black and silver coloring. As of 2026, the current and most prominent Black Tiger is the CMLL luchador enmascarado (masked professional wrestler) formerly known as Magnus.

== Origins ==
According to the storyline set forth by the original anime, Black Tiger is a wrestler trained and sent by a yakuza-like organisation called the Tiger's Cave. The Tiger's Cave desire vengeance upon the wrestler Tiger Mask, a former trainee of theirs, for publicly turning his back on them and no longer paying them monetary tributes. With the anime's protagonist translated by Antonio Inoki to actual NJPW wrestling events (in the form of Satoru Sayama) it was perhaps inevitable that his arch-enemy would also appear in the promotion.

The wrestlers portraying Black Tiger have traditionally been gaijin, somewhat of a throwback to the days in which non-Japanese were portrayed as heels to fight against national heroes such as Rikidōzan to promote national pride after World War II, paralleling the way American promotions would often portray wrestlers depicted as, or indeed actually being from, foreign countries as villains pitted against American-born heroes. In other countries this has varied. Black Tiger IV was a member of Team Japan during the TNA 2006 World X-Cup Tournament and during his CMLL career Black Tiger III was overtly portrayed as being Japanese. Black Tiger V was the first time Black Tiger was played by a Japanese wrestler.

== Incarnations ==
Incarnations of Black Tiger
Generation	Name
Black Tiger I	Mark Rocco
Black Tiger II	Eddie Guerrero
Black Tiger III	César Cuauhtémoc González
Black Tiger IV	Rocky Romero
Black Tiger V	Tatsuhito Takaiwa
Black Tiger VI	Tomohiro Ishii
Black Tiger VII	Nosawa Rongai
Black Tiger VIII	Ricky Reyes
Black Tiger IX	Magnus

=== Black Tiger I ===
Mark "Rollerball" Rocco, an established British wrestler, was the first to assume the persona in 1982 to oppose the original Tiger Mask, Satoru Sayama. His pinnacle of success was defeating Gran Hamada in a tournament final for the vacant WWF Junior Heavyweight Championship on May 6, 1982, and was defeated twenty days later by Tiger Mask for the belt. Sayama left NJPW in 1983 and the rights to Tiger Mask were purchased by All Japan Pro Wrestling the following year for the use of Mitsuharu Misawa. AJPW were not to create a Black Tiger counterpart. Rocco continued to portray Black Tiger in NJPW until 1990.

=== Black Tiger II ===
In August 1993 Black Tiger made a return, this time portrayed by Eddie Guerrero. His Tiger Mask rival at this time was Koji Kanemoto. Kanemoto unmasked in January 1994, while Guerrero was a finalist in the 1994 Super Grade Junior Heavyweight Tag League with The Great Sasuke, came third in the 1994 and 1995 Best of the Super Juniors tournaments and was victorious in 1996.

=== Black Tiger III ===
Following the fall of WCW, alumnus César Cuauhtémoc González, better known as Mexican star Silver King began wrestling for NJPW through their working relationship with his home promotion Consejo Mundial de Lucha Libre. Tiger Mask IV would not sign with NJPW until early 2003 and the highlight of Black Tiger III's Japanese run would be a failed attempt at the IWGP Junior Heavyweight Tag Team Championship alongside his real-life brother Dr. Wagner, Jr. before he devoted himself full-time to his CMLL career. González continued to use the Black Tiger name in Mexican independent companies even after CMLL repackaged him as "El Bronco" following NJPW unveiling Black Tiger IV in 2005. His final match under the persona came when he lost a Mask versus Mask match to L.A. Park on February 4, 2006. He briefly wrestled under the persona again in 2017, teaming with Black Tiger VII to take on Dr Wagner Jr. and El Hijo de Dr. Wagner Jr.

=== Black Tiger IV ===
In 2005 Rocky Romero debuted as Black Tiger IV by NJPW and immediately thrust into a feud with Tiger Mask IV, facing him for the IWGP Junior Heavyweight Championship on May 14. He made his debut for Ring of Honor in America, making him the first Black Tiger to wrestle as Black Tiger in America since Mark Rocco. After winning the NWA World Junior Heavyweight Championship on August 25 he defeated Tiger Mask for his title on October 8, defending them until losing both to Tiger Mask on February 19, 2006. Black Tiger would join Jyushin Thunder Liger's CTU faction and represent NJPW as a member of Team Japan in TNA Wrestling's World X-Cup. Black Tiger IV returned to New Japan in February 2009, joining GBH and restarting his feud with Tiger Mask IV. On April 5, 2009, at Resolution '09 Tiger Mask IV defeated Black Tiger IV in a title vs. mask match. After the match Romero removed his mask and then raised the arm of Tiger Mask thus ending his run as Black Tiger.

=== Black Tiger V ===
Black Tiger's fifth Generation (V) arrived in NJPW at Tokyo Dome February 15, 2009, attacking Tiger Mask IV. For the next couple of months, the new Black Tiger disappeared and was replaced at shows by Black Tiger IV. On April 5, 2009, at Resolution '09 after Tiger Mask had defeated Black Tiger IV for the last time, he was once again attacked by the fifth Black Tiger, who gave him a Death Valley Driver and then unmasked him. On June 20, 2009, at Dominion 6.20, Tiger Mask defeated Black Tiger V in a mask vs. mask match. After the match Black Tiger removed his mask revealing himself as Tatsuhito Takaiwa, breaking the Black Tiger tradition of foreigners under the mask. Takaiwa reprised his role as Black Tiger V in 2011 in Toryumon Mexico, where he lost the mask for the second time on May 14, 2011, to Último Dragón. Despite losing his mask twice, Takaiwa continues to make appearances as Black Tiger V.

=== Black Tiger VI ===
Black Tiger's sixth generation (VI), Tomohiro Ishii, had the shortest run under the mask. In early 2011, Ishii began feuding with Tiger Mask IV and, after losing his hair on January 23, began wearing a Black Tiger mask, despite still going by his real name, which he then lost to Tiger Mask IV on February 20 at The New Beginning.

=== Black Tiger VII ===
Black Tiger's seventh generation (VII) debuted during New Japan's Road to the Super Jr. 2Days Tournament, which took place on April 14 and 15, 2012, and which he went on to win. Following Kazushige Nosawa's May 23 arrest for smuggling cannabis, it was confirmed that he had been portraying Black Tiger. Two days later, New Japan officially pulled Tiger from the Best of the Super Juniors tournament. Nosawa has continued working as Black Tiger VII, most notably for All Japan Pro Wrestling.

=== Black Tiger VIII ===
Black Tiger's eighth generation (VIII) debuted with Team Filthy on NJPW Strong on November 28, 2021, where he attacked former Black Tiger Rocky Romero, causing a DQ finish to a 5 vs 5 tag match, before being revealed to be Romero's former Havana Pitbulls team mate, Ricky Reyes. He used this gimmick until NJPW Windy City Riot 2022.

=== Black Tiger IX ===
Black Tiger's ninth and most recent generation (IX) debuted during New Japan's Fantastica Mania tour in 2026. Unlike other Black Tigers, Black Tiger IX debuted as a tribute to past Black Tigers and Tiger Mask IV, and as a celebration of the partnership between NJPW and CMLL. It was portrayed openly by CMLL Super Estrella Magnus. Although he was still billed by announcers as Magnus, he personally requested that he be billed as Black Tiger for the tour. At the end of the tour, Black Tiger IX embraced Tiger Mask IV in the ring after the latter defeated him. On the March 25 edition of CMLL Informa, it was officially announced that Magnus would be taking over as the ninth Black Tiger full-time.

== Signature moves associated with the character ==
- Black Tiger Bomb (Sitout crucifix powerbomb)
- Kneeling belly to belly piledriver
- Tiger suplex

== Other Black Tigers ==
Puebla-based CMLL luchador Jesús Juárez Hernández has worked under the ring-name Black Tiger as early as 1995, and risen to the rank of CMLL's primary trainer for the Puebla region.

ACH portrayed Tiger The Dark to wrestle opposite Kota Ibushi's portrayal of Tiger Mask W, promoting the anime of the same name.
