= Magnus (luchador) =

Mexican professional wrestler and reality TV personality

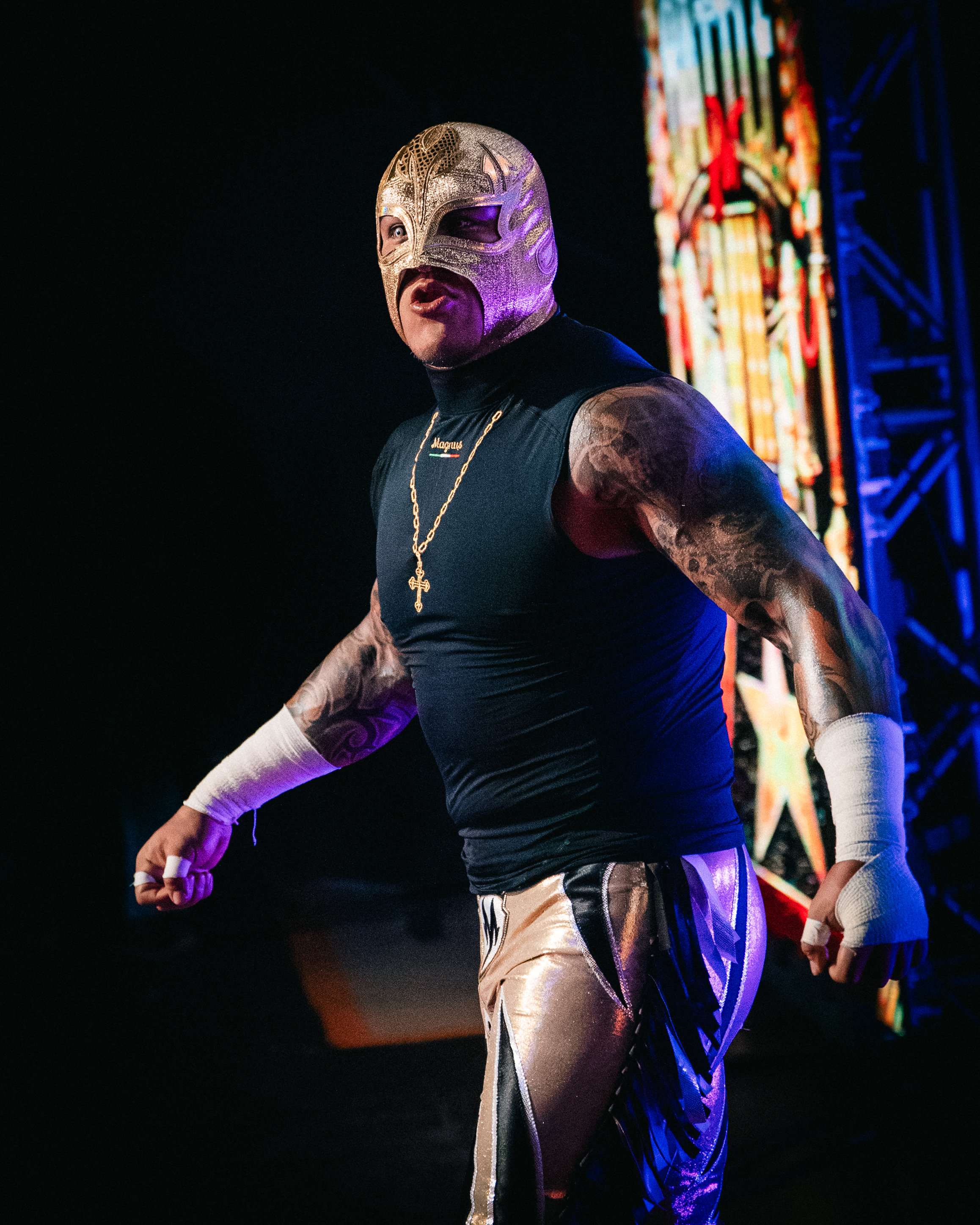
- Magnus in April 2025

Personal information
- Born: February 17, 1993 (age 33) Mexico City, Mexico
- Parent: Tony Salazar (father)
- Relatives: Dr. Karonte (uncle); Argenis (cousin); Místico (cousin)

Professional wrestling career
- Ring name(s): Astro Boy; Black Tiger (IX); Magnus
- Billed height: 1.77 m (5 ft 9 1/2 in)
- Billed weight: 85 kg (187 lb)
- Trained by: Tony Salazar; Franco Colombo; Arkangel de la Muerte
- Debut: 2009

Magnus (born February 17, 1993), currently known as the ninth Black Tiger, is a Mexican luchador enmascarado (masked professional wrestler) and television personality. He predominantly works for Consejo Mundial de Lucha Libre (CMLL), and their Japanese and American partners New Japan Pro-Wrestling (NJPW) and All Elite Wrestling (AEW). His previous ring name was inspired by Roman emperor Magnus Maximus.

Black Tiger's real name is not a matter of public record, as is often the case with masked wrestlers in Mexico when their private lives are kept a secret from the wrestling fans.

== Personal life ==
Magnus is the son of the CMLL trainer and booking team member Tony Salazar and the nephew of Dr. Karonte. Magnus is the cousin of the original Místico (the original Sin Cara in WWE) as well as the cousin of the wrestlers Argenis, Argos, Astro Boy, and Dr. Karonte Jr. (formerly Mini Murder Clown of Los Mini Psycho Circus).

== Professional wrestling career ==
Magnus briefly wrestled for Toryumon Mexico as "Astro Boy", a ring name used by three of his older cousins before him.

=== Consejo Mundial de Lucha Libre (2011) ===
Magnus started his CMLL career as a member of the informal Generación 2011 stable, which also included the newcomers Boby Zavala, Enrique Vera Jr., Hombre Bala Jr., Dragon Lee, Hijo del Signo and Super Halcón Jr. During the press conference, Magnus wore a mask with an open mouth and only a passing resemblance to the mask that CMLL's top tecnico Místico had worn. His mask was redesigned for his first match and the color scheme was changed to be primarily silver, closely resembling the outfits that Místico wore before leaving CMLL, leading people to comment that CMLL was trying to recreate the character with Magnus. CMLL held a Forjando un Ídolo (Spanish for "Forging an idol") tournament in April and May 2011, with the purpose of identifying which of the 16 newcomers in the tournament would move up the ranks of the promotion. The tournament consisted of two rounds, beginning with a round-robin group round, with the top two in each of the four groups competing in an elimination tournament. Magnus defeated Ángel de Plata but lost to both Pólvora and Fuego, leaving him with only three points, not enough to advance to the next round. Magnus entered the 2011 Torneo Gran Alternativa tournament, a tag team tournament that sees a rookie team up with an experienced wrestler for a tournament. Escorpión was randomly teamed up with Brazo de Plata and lost in the first round to Rey Escorpión and Último Guerrero

=== El Luchador and independent circuit (2011–2012) ===
Magnus was one of the featured characters on the CMLL produced reality television show El Luchador ("the Wrestler"), shown on A&E Latinoamericano in both season one and season two. In season one, Magnus was portrayed as a young luchador hopeful, who let his own arrogance stand in the way of his potential. During the final episode, CMLL revealed that Magnus was the son of Tony Salazar and Magnus was suspended from CMLL because of his antics. While the show was portrayed as being "real", parts of the storyline with Magnus were most likely fictional. Magnus injured himself during the filming of the show, which meant that he disappeared from the ring for a couple of months to recuperate. When he resurfaced, he did not work on any CMLL-promoted shows, only working on the Mexican independent circuit on shows that also included CMLL luchadors such as the Toryumon Mexico shows in Mexico City. While competing at Toryumon, he won the XV Torneo Copa Dragon by defeating Tauro in the final. He also lost a number one contendership scramble match for the NWA International Junior Heavyweight Championship. In his absence, CMLL gave the actual "Místico" name, mask and outfit to another wrestler, Dragon Lee, who then became Místico La Nueva Era. During the promotion of the second season, it was mentioned that Magnus had challenged Dragon Lee to a Lucha de Apuesta, mask vs. mask match, playing off the story that the two were friends in season one, before Dragon Lee took over the "Místico" character.

=== Return to CMLL (2012–present) ===
Magnus returned to CMLL in October 2012, coinciding with the first episode of season two of El Luchador. Magnus acknowledged that his attitude had led to him being put out of CMLL and was grateful for the second chance he was given. On his return, he teamed up with fellow Generacion 2011 workers Hombre Bala Jr. and Super Halcón Jr. to defeat the team of Apocalipsis, Inquisidor and Zayco. Magnus unveiled a new look that no longer resembled that of Místico, but instead had the color scheme and general look of Místico's WWE look as Sin Cara. On the March 25, 2026 edition of CMLL Informa, it was officially announced that Magnus would be taking over as the ninth Black Tiger full-time, officially becoming Black Tiger IX.

== Championships and accomplishments ==
- Consejo Mundial de Lucha Libre
  - Mexican National Tag Team Championship (1 time, current) – with Rugido
- Major League Wrestling
  - MLW World Tag Team Championship (1 time) – with Rugido
- Toryumon Mexico
  - Torneo Copa Dragon – XV
