= Dr. Karonte =

Mexican professional wrestler (1957–2019)

Personal information
- Born: Miguel Uribe; 14 February 1957 Mexico City, Mexican Federal District, Mexico
- Died: 26 August 2019 (aged 62)
- Children: Astro Boy (son); Argos (son); Argenis (son); Místico (son); Dr. Karonte Jr. (son)
- Relatives: Tony Salazar (brother); Magnus (nephew); Ulises Jr. (nephew)

Professional wrestling career
- Ring names: Gorhk; Dr. Karonte III; Dr. Karonte

Miguel Uribe (14 February 1957 – 26 August 2019) was a Mexican professional wrestler, best known under the ring name Dr. Karonte. He was not the original "Dr. Karonte", originally working under the name "Gorhk" and in the 1980s began working as "Dr. Karonte III", teaming with the original Dr. Karonte and Dr. Karonte II. He later changed his name to just "Dr. Karonte".

Urive is the father of wrestlers Astro Boy, Argos, Argenis, Místico and Dr. Karonte Jr. (known as La Dinatía Karonte/The Karonte Dynasty), the uncle of wrestlers Magnus and Ulises Jr. as well as the brother of CMLL booker Tony Salazar.

== Personal life ==
He is the father of Astro Boy, Argos, Argenis, Místico, and Karonte Jr. His brother, Tony Salazar, is a retired wrestler who ended up working for Consejo Mundial de Lucha Libre (CMLL) as both a trainer and a booker, Salazar's son Magnus also works for CMLL.

Uribe's death was announced by his family on 26 August 2019.

== Shared identity ==
- Dr. Karonte / Dr. Karonte I

- Manuel Almanza – The original Dr. Karonte, adopted the character and mask in 1960s.
- Version 2 – The adopted son of Manuel Almanza, took over the role when his father retired.

- Dr. Karonte II

- Pascal de la Rosa – First tag team partner or Dr. Karonte I.
- Ben Ali Pasha – The second person to work under the name.
- Caballero de la Cruz – Third and final tag team partner of Dr. Karonte I.

- Dr. Karonte III – Miguel Uribe, dropped the "III" when Dr. Karonte I and II retired.
- Dr. Karonte Jr. (sons of Miguel Uribe)

- Místico – used the name and mask early in his career.
- Argenis – used the name and mask early in his career. Also worked as "El Hijo del Karonte"
- Karonte Jr. – Previously worked as "Mini Monster Clown" and is occasionally billed as Dr. Karonte Jr. and Mini Karonte
