= Místico =

Mexican professional wrestler (born 1982)

- Místico in 2026

Personal information
- Born: Luis Ignacio Urive Alvirde; December 22, 1982 (age 43) Mexico City, Mexico
- Parent: Dr. Karonte (father)
- Relatives: Argenis (brother); Tony Salazar (uncle); Magnus (cousin)

Professional wrestling career
- Ring name(s): Astro Boy; Carístico; Dr. Karonte, Jr. Komachi (III); Místic 2.0; Místico (I); Myzteziz; Sin Cara (I); Sin Cara Azul
- Billed height: 5 ft 7 in (1.70 m)
- Billed weight: 180 lb (82 kg)
- Billed from: Mexico City, Mexico
- Trained by: Tony Salazar; Dr. Karonte; Fray Tormenta
- Debut: April 30, 1998

Luis Ignacio Urive Alvirde (born December 22, 1982), better known by his ring name Místico (Spanish for "Mystic"), is a Mexican professional wrestler. He is signed to both the Mexican promotion Consejo Mundial de Lucha Libre (CMLL), where he is the current CMLL World Light Heavyweight Champion and one-third of the CMLL World Trios Champions with Máscara Dorada and Neón as El Sky Team, and the American promotion All Elite Wrestling (AEW). He also makes appearances for Major League Wrestling (MLW), New Japan Pro-Wrestling (NJPW), and Ring of Honor (ROH). where he is one-half of the ROH World Tag Team Champions with Máscara Dorada.

From 2006 to 2011, Urive was the top técnico (those that portray the "good guys") and biggest box office draw in Mexico for a number of years. Despite having worked under previous ring names, he gained popularity in CMLL as Místico, a religious character who was the storyline protégé of the professional wrestling priest Fray Tormenta. Between 2011 and 2014, he worked for WWE under the ring name Sin Cara (Spanish for "Without Face" or "Faceless"; after which, his ring name was given to his storyline rival Hunico). Urive then worked for Lucha Libre AAA Worldwide (AAA), adopting the name Myzteziz, and returned to CMLL in 2015 under the name Carístico. (Note: The name is a portmanteau of his two most well known names " Místico" and "Sin Cara".) In 2021, he regained the Místico name, due to his successor and tag team partner Místico II leaving CMLL. On two occasions in 2008, Místico held five championships simultaneously and has won most major CMLL championships over the years, as well as CMLL's Torneo Gran Alternativa and Leyenda de Plata tournaments on three occasions each.

Urive is the son of Miguel Urive, who wrestled under the ring name Dr. Karonte, the brother of wrestlers Astro Boy, Argos, Argenis and Dr. Karonte Jr, the cousin of wrestlers Magnus and Ulises Jr. as well as the nephew of CMLL booker Tony Salazar.

== Personal life ==
While most masked professional wrestlers do not reveal their real name unless they are unmasked in a Lucha de Apuestas ("bet match"), Luis Ignacio Urive Alvirde's full name was revealed by WWE when they released Urive from his contract in 2014. Urive was born on December 22, 1982, in Mexico City, Mexico, the son of Miguel Urive, who was a professional wrestler known under the name "Dr. Karonte". He is one of at least five of Miguel Urive's sons to become a professional wrestler. (Note: Unless a luchador has been unmasked as a result of a match, his birth name is normally not revealed to the general public, leading to the possibility that other sons or daughters are wrestling.) His older brother worked under the name "Astro Boy" until his death in the late 1990s. His younger brothers work as the masked wrestlers Argos, Argenis, and Karonte Jr. Urive's uncle, Tony Salazar, is a retired wrestler who ended up working for Consejo Mundial de Lucha Libre (CMLL) as both a trainer and a booker. Salazar's son, Magnus, also works for CMLL.

== Professional wrestling career ==
=== Early career (1998–2003) ===
After training under his father and uncle, Urive made his professional wrestling debut as "Dr. Karonte, Jr." on April 30, 1998, at the age of 15. In 2000, he changed his ring name to "Astro Boy" in honor of his older brother, who previously used the name and had died months earlier. He later formed a tag team with another brother who worked as "Astro Boy II". In 2003, he traveled to Japan to work for Michinoku Pro Wrestling, where he was billed as "Komachi", a ring persona he took over from fellow professional wrestler Volador Jr., who had played the part for about a year.

=== Consejo Mundial de Lucha Libre (2004–2011) ===
==== Rise to stardom (2004–2009) ====
In 2004, CMLL repackaged Urive as Místico, giving him an elaborate backstory to go with his new persona. Místico (the character) was an orphan taken in by the wrestling priest Fray Tormenta, who taught him to wrestle; CMLL's previous attempt at this storyline with El Sagrado failed to take off. He began teaming with Volador Jr. and Misterioso II on the second or third match of the card. On July 16, he participated in the Leyenda de Plata ("The Silver Legend") tournament, eliminating Virus before being eliminated by Tarzan Boy in the first round. Later that year, he won the Torneo Gran Alternativa ("Great Alternative Tournament") with veteran El Hijo del Santo, after which he was nicknamed El Principe de Plata y Oro ("The Prince of Silver and Gold"), a reference to the main colors of his outfits. Shortly afterward, the bookers began teaming him with other established técnicos (faces), such as Negro Casas and Shocker, against the top rúdo (heel) groups Los Guerreros del Infierno and La Furia del Norte. His stature made him an underdog, and his high-flying moves, such as diving arm-drags, made him popular with Arena México crowds.

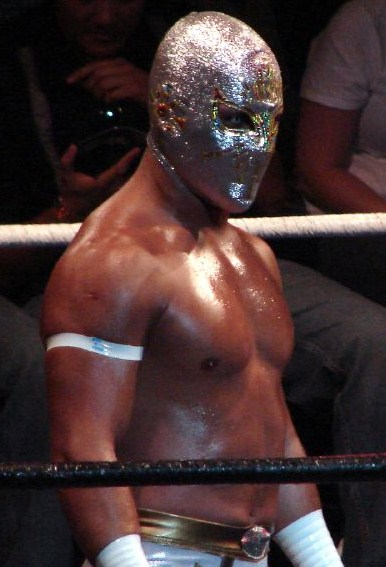
Místico in 2006

Místico won his first title on January 1, 2005, defeating Averno for the NWA World Middleweight Championship; the match was well received by the audience, who threw money into the ring as a sign of appreciation. Two weeks later, he defeated Los Guerreros del Infierno leader Último Guerrero in his first singles main event match. After a brief program pitting him and Dr. Wagner Jr. against Guerrero and Rey Bucanero, Místico feuded with Perro Aguayo Jr. and his group, Los Perros del Mal (Damián 666, Halloween and Héctor Garza). On June 17, they were involved in an eight-man cage match where the last man in the cage lost his hair or mask. Neither man was involved in the finish, where Damián pinned Máscara Mágica. During the third fall of a match with Guerrero in September, he was attacked by now-rúdo Atlantis, whom he defeated in October. Místico was the biggest star in Mexico at the start of 2006, working eighteen main event matches that drew more than ten thousand people; the Wrestling Observer Newsletter's "Year-End Awards" voted him "Performer of the Year", "Biggest Box Office Draw" and "Best Flying Wrestler". He feuded with Black Warrior, who turned on him during a CMLL World Tag Team Championship match. Místico lost his NWA World Middleweight Championship to Warrior on May 12, but defeated him in a mask vs. mask Lucha de Apuestas in the main event of the CMLL 73rd Anniversary Show on September 29, ending their feud.

In early 2007, World Wrestling Entertainment (WWE) reportedly offered Místico a contract, which he could not sign due to commitments with CMLL at the time; the likes of Dean Malenko, Paul London and Rey Mysterio had pushed WWE to offer him a deal. On February 27, he wrestled a tryout match against Malenko and Jamie Noble prior to SmackDown! in San Jose, California. On April 10, Místico defeated Mephisto for the CMLL World Welterweight Championship. On March 10, 2008, Místico and Garza defeated Averno and Mephisto for the tag team championship. Místico had also contacted Total Nonstop Action Wrestling (TNA) about a potential deal, yet his CMLL commitment kept the parties from reaching one. When the commission declared the title vacant after a match ended in a double disqualification, Místico and Garza regained then lost it back to them in December. Místico lost his championship to Casas at Homenaje a Dos Leyendas ("Homage to Two Legends") on March 18, 2009, failing to regain it on April 12. He participated in the Universal Championship tournament on June 12, defeating Ephesto in the first round and Garza in the quarter-finals, before losing to Guerrero in the semi-finals. The feud between Místico and Casas culminated in a Lucha de Apuestas in the main event of the CMLL 76th Anniversary Show on September 18, which Místico won, resulting in Casas being shaved bald. After the match, Místico made an Apuesta challenge to El Felino, Casas' cornerman. He and Ángel de Oro were paired for the Torneo Gran Alternativa on September 25, defeating Atlantis and Camorra in the first round and Mr. Niebla and Tiger Kid in the semi-finals, before losing to Okumura and Yujiro in the finals.

==== Feud with Volador Jr. (2010–2011) ====
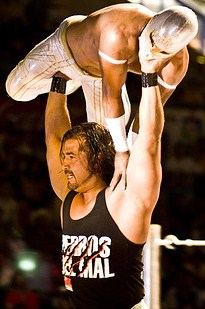
Místico being lifted up by Héctor Garza in 2010

On January 22, 2010, Místico and Averno participated in the Torneo Nacional de Parejas Increibles ("National Incredible Pairs Tournament"), where a técnico is paired with a rúdo; they wore matching outfits and defeated Euforia and Ephesto in the first round. Místico seemingly developed a rúdo attitude in the quarter-finals, attacking Volador Jr. and going so far as to ripping up his mask, performing an illegal low blow on him for the win. Afterward, he took the microphone and commented that "all was fair in war and defending Mexico City", drawing many boos from the crowd. Místico continued working a rúdo style in the semi-finals, but he and Averno lost to Atlantis and Máscara Dorada. Volador Jr. then challenged him to a Super Libre (no rules) match if Místico would agree to it. During a match between the two on February 5, Místico was clearly a rúdo, tearing so viciously at Volador Jr.'s mask that a new one had to be brought to the ring between falls. In the second fall, he pulled his mask off and threw it to Volador Jr. in an attempt to get him disqualified. Volador Jr. won the match when he reversed Místico's La Mística and applied the same move to him. On February 12, Místico lost the Mexican National Light Heavyweight Championship to Volador Jr. He, El Felino, La Sombra and Volador Jr. fought in a four-way Lucha de Apuestas in the main event of Homenaje a Dos Leyendas on March 19; Místico was not one of the first two pinned, thus retaining his mask.

Místico subsequently announced that he was done being a rúdo and returned to the técnico side, although Volador Jr. remained suspicious. At Sin Salida ("No Escape") on June 6, Místico, Dorada and Mr. Águila defeated Averno, Casas and Volador Jr., who worked a rúdo style and was caught cheating by the referee. On July 12, at the Promociones Gutiérrez 1st Anniversary Show, Místico and El Oriental were one of five pareja increibles teams who put their mask on the line, with the losing team being forced to wrestle each other for their masks, facing Atlantis and Olímpico, La Sombra and Histeria, El Alebrije and Volador Jr. and Averno and Guerrero. They were the losing team and fought in a one-on-one match, which Místico won to unmask him. At the CMLL 77th Anniversary Show on September 3, Místico was one of fourteen men putting their mask on the line in a steel cage Lucha de Apuestas, keeping it safe as the eleventh and second-to-last man to leave the cage. On January 23, 2011, during the second night of the Fantastica Mania 2011 tour, Místico defeated Averno in his final match of his first CMLL tenure.

=== New Japan Pro-Wrestling (2009–2011) ===
Místico debuted for New Japan Pro-Wrestling (NJPW) on January 4, 2009, at Wrestle Kingdom III in Tokyo Dome, where he, Prince Devitt and Ryusuke Taguchi defeated Averno, Gedo and Jado. After the match, he expressed his desire to return and challenge for Tiger Mask's IWGP Junior Heavyweight Championship. On February 15, Místico successfully defended his CMLL World Welterweight Championship against Mephisto in Sumo Hall. He, Misterioso Jr. and Okumura were scheduled to tour with NJPW in early May, which was canceled due to the outbreak of the swine flu pandemic. On August 15, Místico defeated Tiger Mask to become the new champion. He successfully defended the title against Jushin Thunder Liger on September 29, but lost it back to Tiger Mask on November 8 at Destruction '09. In January 2011, Místico returned to Japan for the CMLL and NJPW co-promoted Fantastica Mania 2011 tour.

=== WWE (2011–2014) ===
==== Feud with Sin Cara Negro (2011–2012) ====
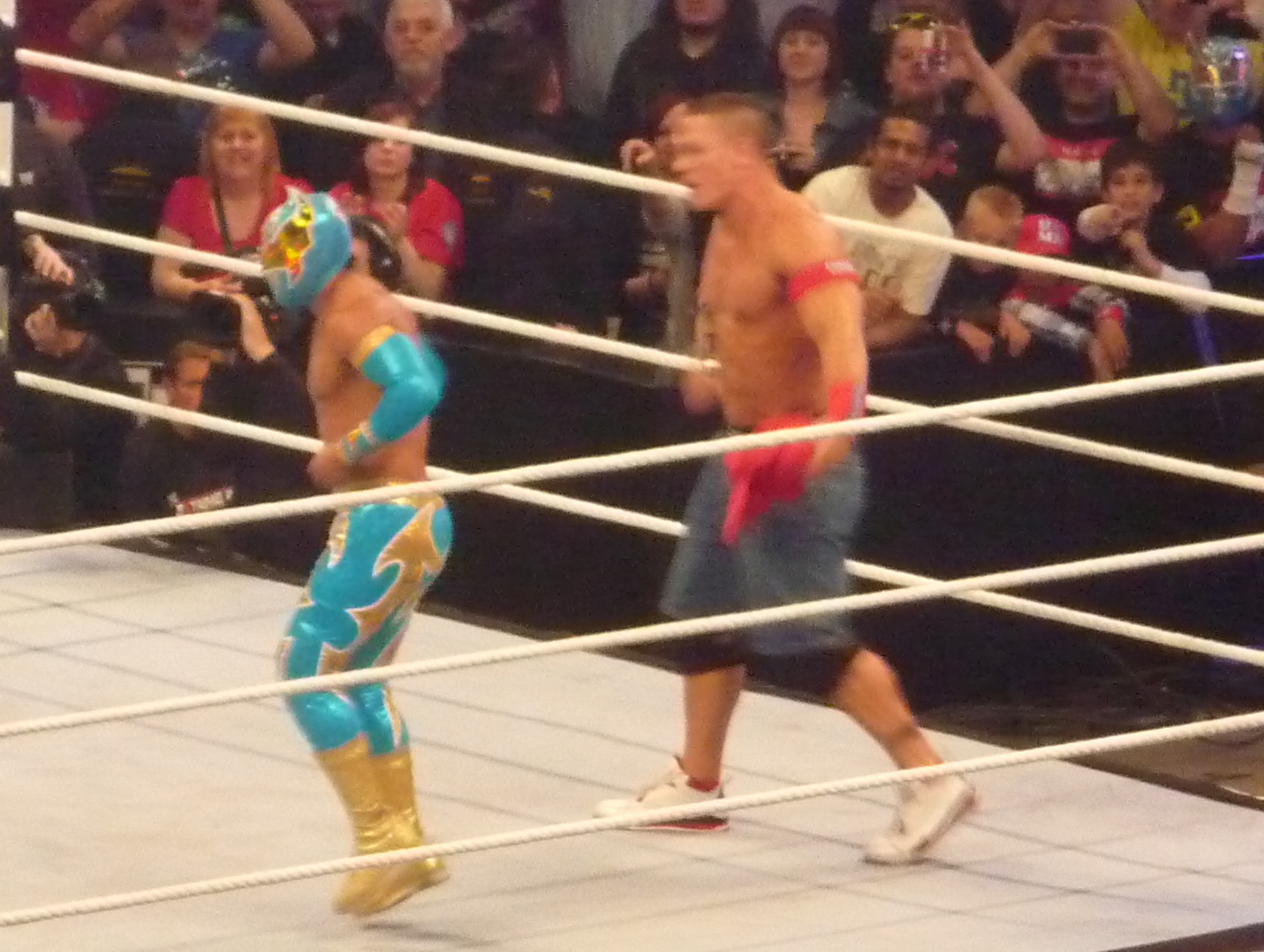
Sin Cara teaming with John Cena in April 2011

On February 24, 2011, WWE held a press conference in Mexico City to introduce Urive under his new name, Sin Cara ("Faceless"). On March 25, Sin Cara made his WWE debut at a Raw live event in Champaign, Illinois, defeating Primo. On the April 4 episode of Raw, Sin Cara debuted by saving Daniel Bryan from an attack by WWE United States Champion Sheamus, establishing himself as a face. On that week's SmackDown, Sin Cara similarly appeared, attacking Jack Swagger and cementing his face status. He made his televised in-ring debut on April 11, defeating Primo. In the 2011 WWE draft, Sin Cara was drafted to SmackDown, making his first appearance as part of the roster on the April 29 episode with a win over Swagger. Sin Cara then started a storyline feud with Chavo Guerrero, who began guest commentating his matches and, much to Sin Cara's dismay, helped him win matches by interfering on his behalf. In his pay-per-view debut, Sin Cara defeated Guerrero at Over the Limit on May 22. His undefeated streak ended in a loss to Christian on the July 1 episode of SmackDown.

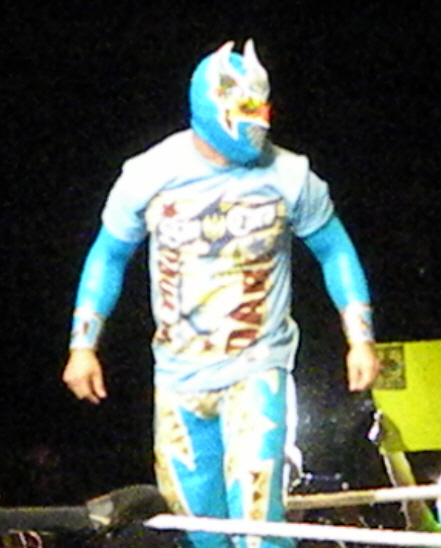
Urive as Sin Cara in June 2011

Sin Cara participated in the World Heavyweight Championship Money in the Bank ladder match at the eponymous pay-per-view on July 17, but lost after being taken out of the match with a storyline injury. The following day, WWE announced that they had suspended Urive for 30 days for his first violation of its Wellness program. He later claimed that he did not know what he had tested positive for and that he had received a routine injection for an injured knee in Mexico. The Sin Cara character, portrayed by WWE developmental wrestler Jorge Arriaga due to Urive's suspension, returned on the August 12 episode of SmackDown, defeating Tyson Kidd. After another week of Arriaga portraying Sin Cara, Urive returned under the mask at a live event on August 20. On August 26, it was reported that Urive had been sent home from the week's SmackDown tapings, with Arriaga once again appearing on TV under the mask. During Urive's time away, the Sin Cara character seemingly turned heel by attacking Bryan.

On Raw's September 19 episode, the original Sin Cara was booked to face Cody Rhodes, but was attacked by his impostor prior to the match. On the September 23 episode of SmackDown, the impostor Sin Cara attacked the original during his match with Bryan, then took his place and pinned Bryan. The following week, the impostor revealed new black attire to distinguish himself from the original, explaining that he was going to steal the Sin Cara identity from Urive, just as Urive had stolen the Místico identity from him, leading to a match between the two Sin Caras at Hell in a Cell on October 2. To further distinguish the two characters, WWE began referring to the original as Sin Cara "Azul" ("Blue") and the impostor as Sin Cara "Negro" ("Black"). Sin Cara Azul defeated Sin Cara Negro at Hell in a Cell. At the October 16 taping of SmackDown in Mexico City, Sin Cara Azul defeated Sin Cara Negro in a mask vs. mask match, forcing him to unmask afterward. Their rivalry continued after Sin Cara Negro changed his ring name to Hunico and aligned with Camacho. At Survivor Series on November 20, they were on opposite sides of a ten-man tag match; Sin Cara was eliminated after suffering a legitimate patellar tendon rupture while diving out of the ring. He underwent surgery and was unable to wrestle for over six months.

Sin Cara returned at a live event on May 19, 2012, defeating Hunico in the opening match. On the June 1 episode of SmackDown, Sin Cara returned to television in new red and white attire, defeating Heath Slater. He defeated Hunico at No Way Out on June 17. On the July 9 episode of Raw, Sin Cara defeated Slater to qualify for the World Heavyweight Championship Money in the Bank ladder match at the titular event on July 15, which was won by Dolph Ziggler.

==== Teaming with Rey Mysterio (2012–2014) ====
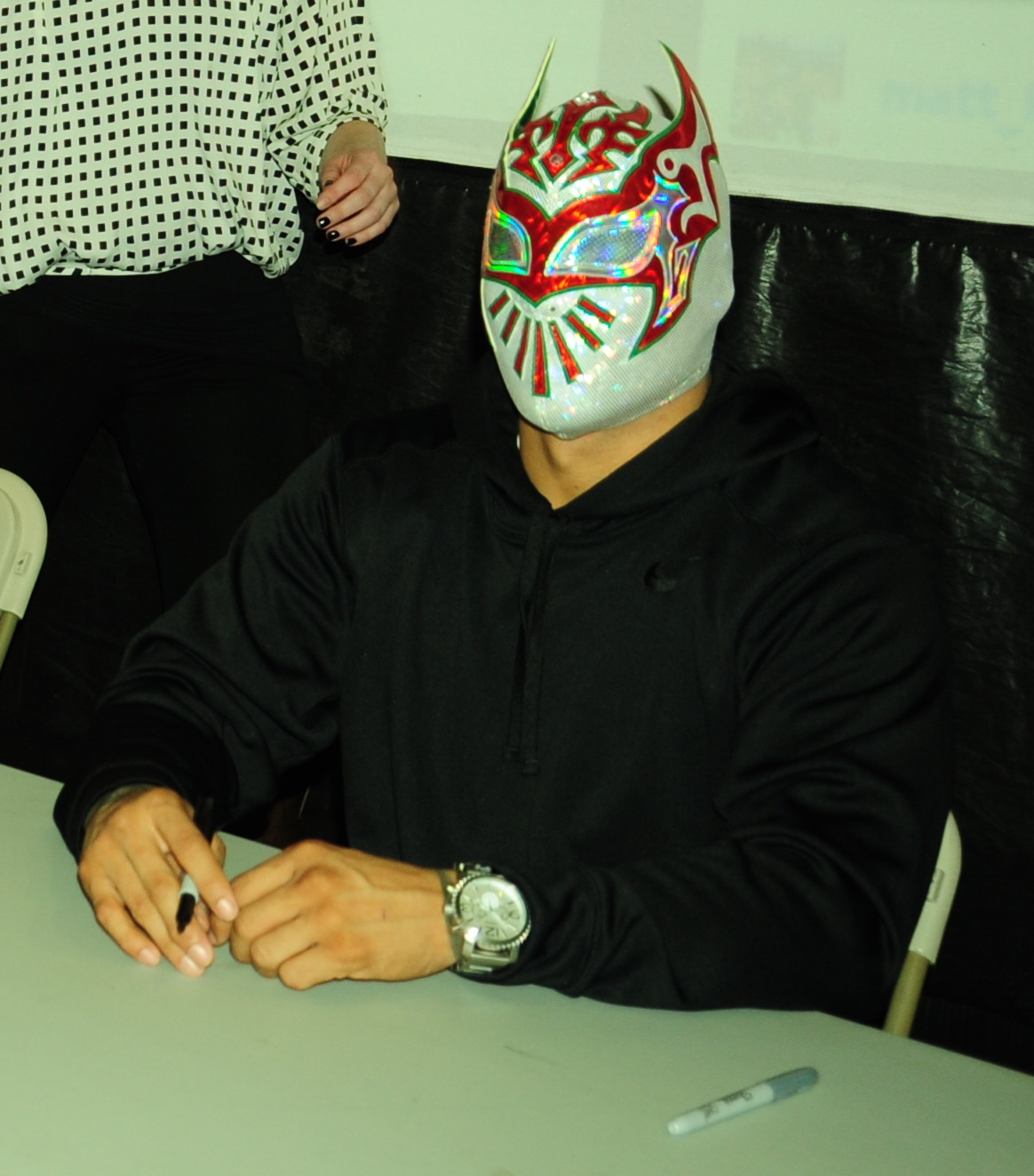
Sin Cara signing autographs

In August, Sin Cara feuded with Rhodes, who claimed that he was wearing a mask to cover his ugly face. Sin Cara scored pinfall wins over Rhodes in consecutive matches on SmackDown and Raw, both times taking advantage of Rhodes trying to remove his mask. On September 16, at Night of Champions, Sin Cara unsuccessfully challenged for The Miz's Intercontinental Championship in a four-way match also involving Rhodes and Rey Mysterio. Sin Cara and Mysterio entered a tournament to determine the number one contenders to the WWE Tag Team Championship, defeating Primo and Epico and The Prime Time Players (Titus O'Neil and Darren Young) to advance to the final, which they lost to Team Rhodes Scholars (Rhodes and Damien Sandow). At Survivor Series on November 18, Sin Cara, Mysterio, Brodus Clay, Justin Gabriel and Kidd won a ten-man elimination tag team match against the Prime Time Players, Epico, Primo and Tensai.

On December 16, at TLC: Tables, Ladders & Chairs, Sin Cara and Mysterio lost to Team Rhodes Scholars in a number one contenders tables match for the WWE Tag Team Championship. Two days later on SmackDown, Sin Cara suffered a legitimate knee injury and was written off television after an attack by The Shield (Dean Ambrose, Roman Reigns and Seth Rollins). He returned on January 27, 2013, at the Royal Rumble, entering the titular match at number twenty-nine, but was eliminated by Ryback. On the August 19 episode of Raw, Sin Cara dislocated his ring finger during a match with Alberto Del Rio. In his final match as Sin Cara, Urive unsuccessfully challenged him for the World Heavyweight Championship in Monterrey on October 19. In January 2014, Urive announced that he would return to Mexico in February. An interview of Urive that aired in late January saw him claim that while he had departed WWE, he still owned the Sin Cara character; Urive also blamed WWE for not allowing him to wrestle the style he used in Mexico. On March 27, WWE stated that they had released Urive the day prior.

=== Lucha Libre AAA Worldwide (2014–2015) ===
On February 19, 2014, the Wrestling Observer Newsletter reported that Urive had signed with Lucha Libre AAA Worldwide (AAA) and would make his debut two days later. At the end of AAA's February 21 event, AAA's main rúdo stable, La Sociedad, attacked the promotion's top técnicos with help from the debuting Black Warrior. This led to AAA president Marisela Peña Roldán revealing her own surprise wrestler, Urive, who appeared on the darkened entrance stage, but did not enter the ring or say anything. It was later reported that Urive was under a WWE non-compete clause until May and could not show his mask. On May 17, Urive made another appearance, during which he was referred to only as a "mysterious wrestler", attacking La Sociedad and especially targeting old rival Averno, who was making his AAA debut. On May 28, AAA revealed promotional material, which suggested Urive would be returning to the Místico ring name. However, on June 5, the promotion revealed his new ring name as Myzteziz, which was exclusive to AAA; Urive continued to work as Sin Cara outside of the promotion.

Myzteziz made his in-ring debut on June 7 at Verano de Escándalo ("Summer of Scandal"), where he, Cibernético and La Parka defeated Averno, AAA Latin American Champion Chessman and El Hijo del Perro Aguayo in a six-man tag team main event, with Myzteziz submitting Chessman. On August 17, at Triplemanía XXII, Myzteziz took part in a four-way elimination main event for the Copa Triplemanía XXII, but lost after a low blow from winner Aguayo. At Héroes Inmortales VIII on October 12, Myzteziz won a Royal Rumble Lumberjack match for the Copa Antonio Peña. On May 24, 2015, Myzteziz came together with former WWE wrestlers El Patrón Alberto and Rey Mysterio Jr. to form the "Dream Team" for AAA's Lucha Libre World Cup, winning the tournament by defeating Johnny Mundo, Matt Hardy and Mr. Anderson in the finals. At Triplemanía XXIII on August 9, Myzteziz lost to Mysterio in what was billed as a "dream match". Following the match, Myzteziz turned rúdo, attacking Mysterio and challenging him to a mask vs. mask rematch. After appearing at a CMLL event on October 9, Urive announced he was looking to return to the promotion after finishing his commitments with AAA. On October 12, AAA announced on a press release that Urive was no longer part of the promotion.

=== Independent circuit (2014–present) ===
Sin Cara's first post-WWE match took place in the main event of his self-produced independent event on February 1, 2014, featuring wrestlers from both AAA and CMLL. Sin Cara teamed with his brother, Argenis, and La Sombra to defeat fellow brother Argos, Black Warrior and El Oriental, submitting Warrior with La Mística. On March 1, he defeated Warrior to win the vacant Baja Star's Wrestling (BSW) Intercontinental Middleweight Championship.

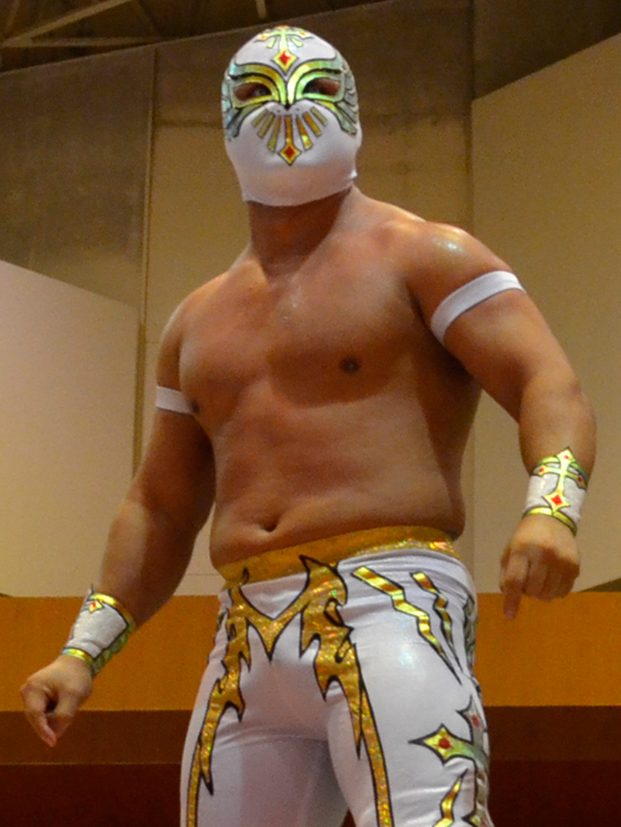
Carístico in 2016

On October 16, 2015, upon joining Lucha Libre Elite (LLE), Urive announced his new ring name as Místic 2.0. However, on October 25, he announced he would instead be using the name "Carístico", a combination of the names Sin Cara and Místico. On May 21, 2016, Carístico became the inaugural LLE Elite Middleweight Champion. He returned to Michinoku Pro Wrestling on September 16, entering the Fukumen World League and winning three days later by defeating Revolución, who was then forced to unmask. At Promocione El Cholo's Christmas show, he defeated Histeria in a Lucha de Apuestas, forcing him to unmask and reveal his real name. On May 26, 2018, Carístico made his debut within the Puerto Rico circuit, unsuccessfully challenging Roger Díaz for the Champion Wrestling Association (CWA)'s world heavyweight championship. Despite working under his CMLL character, his previous role as Sin Cara was emphasized during the reveal and the promotion for the event. On November 3, Carístico outlasted Ángel de Oro, Dragon Bane, Freelance, Gran Guerrero, Laredo Kid, Sadico and Valiente to win the Lucha Libre Boom Cruiserweight Championship. The following month, he became the first KAOZ Cruiserweight Champion, holding the title until Emperado Azteca defeated him on May 19, 2019.

=== Return to CMLL (2015–present) ===
==== Carístico (2015–2021) ====
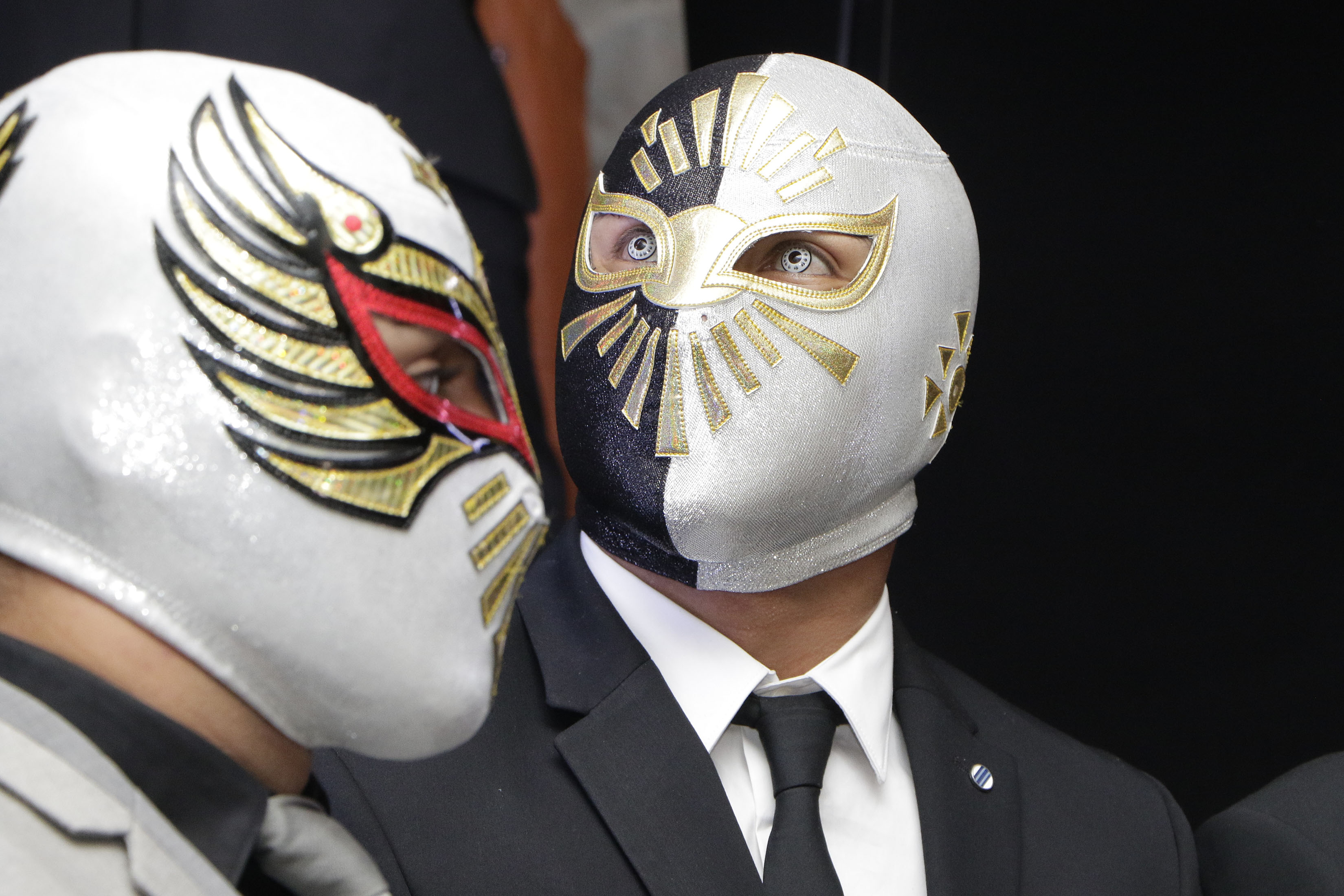
Carístico (left) and the new Místico (right)

On December 12, 2015, Carístico returned to CMLL, wrestling his first match for the company since 2011. At the time of his return, CMLL and LLE were working closely together, as several CMLL wrestlers worked LLE shows and vice versa. Carístico became a regular for CMLL and split his time between the two promotions until they broke off their relationship in September 2016. For the 2016 Torneo Nacional de Parejas Increíbles, Carístico was forced to team with LLE rival Cibernético, defeating the teams of The Panther and Tiger, Rey Escorpión and Último Guerrero and Atlantis and Gran Guerrero to qualify for the finals, where they lost to Mephisto and the man who had taken over the Místico character, Místico II. At the CMLL 83rd Anniversary Show on September 2, he, Atlantis and Máscara Dorada defeated La Peste Negra (Bárbaro Cavernario, El Felino and Negro Casas).

On January 27, 2017, Carístico unsuccessfully challenged Mephisto for the CMLL World Welterweight Championship. The following month, they were paired for the Torneo Nacional de Parejas Increíbles, defeating Ángel de Oro and Rey Bucanero and Diamante Azul and Pierroth before losing to Cavernario and Volador Jr. in the semi-finals. He teamed with Atlantis and Marco Corleone in a loss to Los Ingobernables (La Máscara and Rush) and Kraneo on March 17 at Homenaje a Dos Leyendas. Carístico then teamed with novato wrestler Soberano for the Torneo Gran Alternativa, defeating the teams of Ángel de Oro and Oro Jr., Flyer and Volador Jr. and Canelo Casas and Negro Casas to qualify for the finals on June 16, which they won by defeating Sansón and Último Guerrero. At the CMLL 84th Anniversary Show on September 16, he, Flip Gordon and Volador Jr. defeated Guerrero, Mephisto and Satoshi Kojima. The following month, Carístico and Volador Jr. won the semi-final torneo cibernetico of the Leyenda de Plata to advance to the finals, which Volador Jr. won.

Carístico as NWA World Historic Middleweight Champion in August 2019

Heading into 2018, Carístico was paired with Euforia for the Torneo Nacional de Parejas Increíbles, defeating Dragon Lee and Sansón and Corleone and Shocker before losing to El Terrible and Rush in the semi-finals. On August 21, Carístico defeated Guerrero to win his first NWA World Historic Middleweight Championship. At the CMLL 85th Anniversary Show on September 14, he, El Hijo de L.A. Park and L. A. Park lost to Azul and The Lucha Brothers (King Phoenix and Penta El Zero M). Carístico made his first successful title defense against Gran Guerrero on October 2. During the Universal Championship tournament, he defeated Cavernario in the first round before losing to Lee in the quarter-finals. At Homenaje a Dos Leyendas on March 15, 2019, he, Lee and Volador Jr. unsuccessfully challenged Euforia, Gran Guerrero and Último Guerrero for the CMLL World Trios Championship. On September 27, Carístico, Místico II and Valiente failed to win the Mexican National Trios Championship from Nueva Generacion Dinamita (El Cuatrero, Forastero and Sansón) at the CMLL 86th Anniversary Show.

At Día de Muertos on November 1, Carístico and Místico II defeated Euforia and Gran Guerrero to win the CMLL World Tag Team Championship, successfully defending it against El Cuatrero and Forastero at Sin Piedad ("No Mercy") on January 1, 2020. On February 28, Carístico and Forastero defeated Cavernario and Volador Jr. to win that year's Torneo Nacional de Parejas Increíbles. At the CMLL 87th Anniversary Show on September 25, he and Místico II defeated Espíritu Negro and Rey Cometa to retain the title. For the following year's version of the tournament, he and Virus lost to Templario and Volador Jr. in the finals on June 25. On August 25, 2021, Místico II was released from CMLL, thus vacating the championship.

==== Return as Místico and 20th anniversary (2021–2024) ====
That same day, CMLL announced that Urive would use the name and mask of Místico again for the first time in a decade. On December 25, he retained the World Historic Middleweight Championship against old rival Averno. They lost to Atlantis Jr. and Stuka Jr. in the finals of the Torneo Nacional de Parejas Increíbles on February 25, 2022. On April 29, Místico defeated Titán to win the Universal Championship tournament. At the CMLL 89th Anniversary Show on September 16, he lost to Ángel de Oro in the finals of a tournament for the Copa Independencia ("Independence Cup"), also involving Volador Jr. On February 17, 2023, Místico and Averno defeated Soberano Jr. and Templario to win that year's Torneo Nacional de Parejas Increíbles. On April 7, he competed in that year's Universal Championship tournament, but lost to Atlantis Jr. in the three-way semi-finals also involving Rocky Romero.

Místico in 2024

On August 18, Místico won his first International Gran Prix, lastly eliminating Hiromu Takahashi after submitting him with La Mistica. Nine days later, he retained the World Historic Middleweight Championship against Takahashi when the match ended in a draw after a double pin. At the CMLL 90th Anniversary Show on September 16, Místico, Atlantis Jr. and Máscara Dorada defeated Kevin Knight, Romero and TJP. On September 29, he successfully defended the title against Virus at Noche de Campeones ("Night of Champions"). On February 2, 2024, he won the Torneo Gran Alternativa with Brillante Jr. Four days later, he won his first Reyes del Aire ("Kings of the Air") tournament, lastly eliminating Ángel de Oro. At Homenaje a Dos Leyendas on March 29, Místico, Blue Panther, Último Guerrero and Volador Jr. defeated Bryan Danielson, Claudio Castagnoli, Jon Moxley and Matt Sydal. Místico celebrated his 20th anniversary as a wrestler at Fantastica Mania Mexico on June 21, defeating Takahashi in their rematch. Following the event, he began a feud with the returning Chris Jericho, culminating in the main event of the CMLL 91st Anniversary Show on September 13, where Místico defeated Jericho. On October 30, he vacated the World Historic Middleweight Championship in hopes of moving to the lightweight division. On November 29, he defeated Hechicero to win the Leyenda de Azul ("The Blue Legend") tournament.

==== El Sky Team (2025–present) ====
In January 2025, Místico, Dorada and Neón formed a trio known as El Sky Team, defeating Los Infernales (Averno, Euforia and Mephisto) on May 16 to win the CMLL World Trios Championship. In August, MJF called out Místico, who challenged MJF for the CMLL World Light Heavyweight Championship, which he accepted on the condition that Místico put his mask on the line at the CMLL 92nd Anniversary Show. At the event on September 19, Místico defeated MJF in a title vs. mask Lucha de Apuestas to win the title, becoming a double champion. At Homenaje a Dos Leyendas on March 18, 2026, El Sky Team successfully defended their championship against Death Riders (Daniel Garcia, Moxley and Wheeler Yuta). On September 18 at the CMLL 93rd Anniversary Show, Místico and Averno were involved in a four-way elimination tag team match, where the winners advanced to a Lucha de Apuestas in the main event. In the end, Místico and Averno were victorious, Místico then defeated Averno, forcing him to shave his head.

=== Return to NJPW (2016, 2019–present) ===
Urive, as Carístico, made a one-off return to NJPW on August 21, 2016, teaming with Titán and Volador Jr. to defeat Euforia, Gran Guerrero and Último Guerrero. He made his full-time return in January 2019 as part of the Fantastica Mania 2019 tour. In August, he participated in the Super J-Cup, defeating Bushi and Soberano Jr. in the first two rounds, but lost to Dragon Lee in the semi-final. On January 20, 2020, he defeated Bárbaro Cavernario to retain the NWA World Historic Middleweight Championship on the final night of the Fantastica Mania 2020 tour.

As Místico, Urive returned on September 11, 2022, at a taping for the October 29 episode of Strong, where he and Alex Zayne defeated Blake Christian and Máscara Dorada. In February 2023, he participated in the revived Fantastica Mania 2023 tour. At Fighting Spirit Unleashed on October 28, he, Atlantis, Atlantis Jr. and Hiroshi Tanahashi defeated Adrian Quest, Rocky Romero, Soberano Jr. and Tiger Mask. He also defeated TJP on November 10 at Lonestar Shootout. At King of Pro-Wrestling on October 14, 2024, Místico lost to Hiromu Takahashi, who then challenged him to a mask vs. hair match at the CMLL 92nd Anniversary Show. On February 28, 2025, he retained the MLW World Middleweight Championship against Averno in the main event of the Fantastica Mania 2025 tour's final show. The following year, Místico and Dorada, representing El Sky Team, won a tag team tournament during the Fantastica Mania 2026 tour, defeating SHO and Último Guerrero in the first round, Los Viajeros Del Espacio (Futuro and Valiente Jr.) in the semi-finals, and Averno and Magnus in the finals. He also successfully defended the CMLL World Light Heavyweight Championship against Soberano Jr. on the final night.

On Night 2 of Wrestling Dontaku on May 4, 2026, Místico and El Desperado defeated Ichiban Sweet Boys (Robbie Eagles and Kosei Fujita) to win the IWGP Junior Heavyweight Tag Team Championship. Following this, El Desperado challenged Místico to a match on June 14 at Dominion 6.14 in Osaka-jo Hall, which Místico lost via submission. On November 3 at Power Struggle, Místico announced that he and Desperado would vacate the junior tag titles due to Despeardo dealing with a back injury, ending their reign at 183 days.

=== All Elite Wrestling / Ring of Honor (2023–present) ===
Místico with Mascara Dorada as the ROH World Tag Team Champions in August 2026.

On October 18, 2023, Místico made his All Elite Wrestling (AEW) debut at a taping for Rampage, which aired two days later, defeating Rocky Romero. In January 2024, it was announced that Místico, Hechicero, Máscara Dorada and Volador Jr. would represent CMLL in AEW, signalling Místico's return to the company. On the January 31 episode of Dynamite, the four men appeared ringside during Jon Moxley's match against Jeff Hardy. After being taunted by Moxley during the match, the four men attacked him after his victory, before being chased off by Christopher Daniels, Matt Sydal, Angelo Parker and Matt Menard, whom they defeated on the February 2 episode of Rampage. On the May 29 episode of Dynamite, Místico returned to participate in the men's Casino Gauntlet match for a shot at the AEW World Championship. On June 30, at Forbidden Door Zero Hour, Místico and The Lucha Brothers (Penta El Zero Miedo and Rey Fénix) defeated Los Ingobernables de Japón (Takahashi, Titán and Yota Tsuji).

On March 13, Mistico made his return to the now sister promotion of AEW, Ring of Honor (ROH), after six years, teaming with Atlantis and Esfinge to defeat Euforia, Romero and Valiente. On June 11, 2025, after defeating Blake Christian at Dynamite: Summer Blockbuster, Místico was confronted by MJF, leading to a match at Grand Slam Mexico on June 18, where Místico defeated MJF by disqualification. After the match, MJF continued to attack Místico and unmasked him. At All In on July 12, Místico participated in the Casino Gauntlet match, which was won by MJF.

At Revolution on March 15, 2026, Místico and JetSpeed (Kevin Knight and "Speedball" Mike Bailey) defeated the Don Callis Family (Kazuchika Okada, Kyle Fletcher and Mark Davis) to win the AEW World Trios Championship, becoming a triple champion in both CMLL and AEW. After the match, it was announced that Místico had signed with AEW, while also keeping his contract with CMLL. On the April 8 tapings of Collision (aired on April 11), Místico and JetSpeed lost their titles to The Dogs (David Finlay, Clark Connors and Gabe Kidd), ending their reign at 25 days (27 days as recognized by AEW). On June 26, Místico and Dorada defeated Sammy Guevara and The Beast Mortos to win the ROH World Tag Team Championship.

=== Major League Wrestling (2024–present) ===
At Major League Wrestling (MLW)'s Kings of Colosseum event on January 7, 2024, it was announced that Místico would make his debut at SuperFight on February 2, where he defeated Averno. At Intimidation Games on February 29, Místico defeated Rocky Romero to win the MLW World Middleweight Championship. He successfully defended the title against Bárbaro Cavernario at Azteca Lucha on May 11. At Battle Riot VI on June 1, he participated in the 40-man Battle Riot match for the MLW World Heavyweight Championship, eliminating Jesús Rodriguez before being eliminated by Star Jr. He then participated in the Opera Cup, defeating Magnus in the first round and Atlantis Jr. in the quarter-finals at Summer of the Beasts on June 26. At Fightland on September 14, after defeating Bad Dude Tito in the semi-finals, Místico defeated KENTA to win the tournament. On December 5, Místico successfully defended both his mask and title against Trevor Lee at One Shot. On April 5, 2025, Místico vacated the title to move up to the heavyweight division, ending his reign at 401 days. He then won that year's Opera Cup, defeating Ikuro Kwon, Último Guerrero and Austin Aries en route to the finals, where he defeated Volador Jr. at MLW x Don Gato Tequila: Lucha de los Muertos on November 20.

== In other media ==
Capitalizing on Místico's popularity, CMLL created a comic book starring Místico as an urban hero, which reached its 50th issue in December 2007. Místico starred in the official music video for the song "Me Muero" by Spanish pop group La 5ª Estación, which was also his entrance theme during his first CMLL run. He has also appeared in two music videos for Banda Pequeños Musical. In 2009, he starred in a commercial endorsing the PAN (National Action Party) political party in Mexico.

Urive, as Sin Cara, appears as a playable character in the video games WWE '12, WWE '13 and WWE 2K14.

== Wrestling style, persona, and reception ==
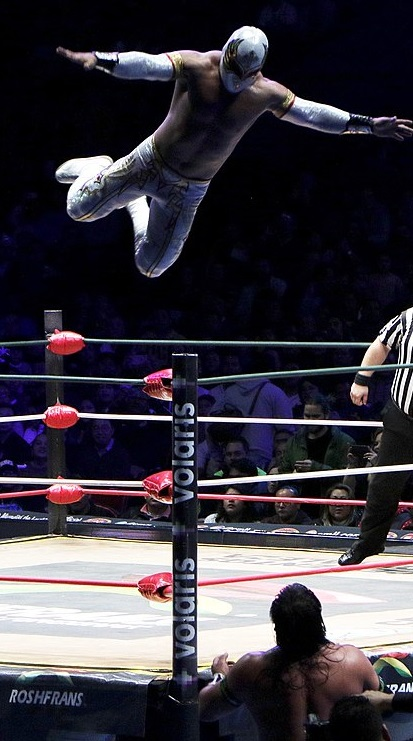
Urive performing a risky dive out of the ring onto Último Guerrero in November 2018

Early in his career, Urive began to stand out from other lower ranked wrestlers because of the speed that he was able to execute various high flying lucha libre moves and dives both in and out of the ring. Pro Wrestling Illustrated noted that his La Mística finishing move was often executed so fast that his opponents did not have time to react until it was locked in. La Mística is, in reality, a series of moves used by many wrestlers over the years, but Urive's version is a combination of the spinning tilt-a-whirl headscissors takedown transitioned into a single arm DDT that brings his opponent to the mat, allowing him to instantly switch the move into a fujiwara armbar, normally on the opponent's left arm, that would force them to submit. The "La Mística" move became so synonymous with the Místico character that Urive's successor also adopted it as his finishing move. Urive occasionally used the move while working as Sin Cara and made it his main finishing move after returning to Mexico. As Sin Cara, he used a moonsault side slam and senton bomb as his finishing moves, both of which are executed off the top rope; for the moonsault side slam, an opponent was thrown off the top rope, with Urive landing on top of the opponent, while the senton sees Urive leap off the top rope onto a prone opponent.

Throughout his career, Urive has primarily portrayed a técnico (heroic) character, with brief periods where he played a more ambiguous character who straddled the técnico/rúdo divide. When introduced as Místico in 2004, CMLL created an elaborate fictional backstory, where he was an orphan who was taught to wrestle by Fray Tormenta, a wrestling priest who also acted as his Padrino ("Godfather"). As part of the religious backstory, Místico would often pose with his hands put together in a "praying" motion and adorn his tights with crucifix like patterns. Early in his career, he wore mainly white trunks and masks with either silver or gold adornment, earning him the nickname "El Príncipe de Plata y Oro" ("The Prince of Silver and Gold"). The Místico mask only has eye holes, totally covering the nose, mouth and ears, a design that was replicated in the masks Urive wore as Sin Cara, Myzteziz and Carístico, with variations on the design that adorn the mask. The Carístico mask retains the same basic design as Místico, but with an added crucifix on the forehead and sweeping wing design around the eye openings.

In 2006 and 2007, readers of the Wrestling Observer Newsletter voted him the "Best Flying Wrestler" based on his in-ring performance in Mexico. He was ranked third in Pro Wrestling Illustrated's list of the top 500 wrestlers of 2007. However, his reputation as a wrestler in Mexico contrasted with his work in WWE. He developed a reputation of being prone to not being able to execute some of the high-risk/high-flying moves, labeling the problems as "botching" the moves, which followed him for the entire three years of his WWE career. Former WWE producer Arn Anderson stated that: "this guy didn't show me anything. Not a damn thing. He had a bad attitude." Rey Mysterio said during an interview that Urive did not "have the desire" to be in WWE. Jorge Arriaga, who took the Sin Cara character when Urive was fired, said that "[the original Sin Cara] is the biggest signing that he had from Mexico. He comes in, he doesn't do anything".

== Championships and accomplishments ==
- All Elite Wrestling
  - AEW World Trios Championship (1 time) – with Kevin Knight and Mike Bailey
- Lucha Libre AAA Worldwide
  - Copa Antonio Peña (2014)
  - Lucha Libre World Cup (2015) – with El Patrón Alberto and Rey Mysterio Jr.
- Baja Star's Wrestling
  - BSW Intercontinental Middleweight Championship (1 time, final)
- Consejo Mundial de Lucha Libre
  - CMLL Universal Championship (2022)
  - CMLL World Light Heavyweight Championship (1 time, current)
  - CMLL World Tag Team Championship (5 times) – with Negro Casas (2), Héctor Garza (2) and Místico (1)
  - CMLL World Trios Championship (1 time, current) - with Máscara Dorada and Neón
  - CMLL World Welterweight Championship (1 time)
  - Mexican National Light Heavyweight Championship (1 time)
  - NWA World Historic Middleweight Championship (1 time)
  - NWA World Middleweight Championship (2 times) (Note: CMLL left the National Wrestling Alliance (NWA) in the late 1980s, but retains control of some titles with the "NWA" name; the NWA does not recognize or sanction any CMLL championship still bearing the NWA initials.)
  - Vive Latino Championship (1 time)
  - Copa Bicentenario (2022) – with Rocky Romero
  - Copa Dinastías (2023) – with Dr. Karonte I
  - Torneo Gran Alternativa (2004) – with El Hijo del Santo
  - Torneo Gran Alternativa (2007) – with La Sombra
  - Torneo Gran Alternativa (2017) – with Soberano Jr.
  - Torneo Gran Alternativa (2022) – with Panterita del Ring Jr.
  - Torneo Gran Alternativa (2024) – with Brillante Jr.
  - Torneo Nacional de Parejas Increíbles (2020) – with Forastero
  - Torneo Nacional de Parejas Increíbles (2023) - with Averno
  - Leyenda de Plata (2006, 2007, 2008)
  - Leyenda de Azul (2024)
  - International Gran Prix (2023, 2025)
  - Torneo Cibernetico Internationacional (2024)
  - Lucha De Naciones 2024
  - Reyes del Aire (2024)
  - Copa 70 Aniversario de la Arena Mexico (with Último Guerrero, Ángel de Oro and Bárbaro Cavernario)
  - Copa Bobby Bonales (2022)
- Festival Mundial de Lucha Libre
  - FMLL World Championship (1 time)
- International Wrestling Revolution Group
  - IWRG Intercontinental Super Welterweight Championship (1 time)
- Kaoz Lucha Libre
  - Kaoz Cruiserweight Championship (1 time)
- Lucha Libre Boom
  - LLB Cruiserweight Championship (1 time)
- Lucha Libre Elite
  - Elite Middleweight Championship (1 time)
  - Liga Élite (2016)
- Major League Wrestling
  - MLW World Middleweight Championship (1 time)
  - Opera Cup (2024, 2025)
- Michinoku Pro Wrestling
  - Fukumen World League (2016)
  - Michinoku Trios League (2003) – with Hayate and Yamabiko
- New Japan Pro-Wrestling
  - IWGP Junior Heavyweight Championship (1 time)
  - IWGP Junior Heavyweight Tag Team Championship (1 time) – with El Desperado
  - Fantastica Mania Tag Team Tournament (2026) – with Máscara Dorada
- Promociones El Cholo
  - Promociones El Cholo Cruiserweight Championship (1 time)
- Pro Wrestling Illustrated
  - Ranked 3 of the 500 best singles wrestlers in the PWI 500 in 2007
- Pro Wrestling Revolution
  - PWR Heavyweight Championship (1 time, current)
  - PWR Openweight World Championship (1 time)
- Ring of Honor
  - ROH World Tag Team Championship (1 time, current) – with Máscara Dorada
- Toryumon Mexico
  - Sofia Cup (2005)
- Universal Wrestling Entertainment
  - Trofeo Bicentenario (2010)
- World Wrestling Association
  - WWA Middleweight Championship (1 time)
- Wrestling Observer Newsletter
  - Wrestler of the Year (2006, 2025)
  - Best Box Office Draw (2006)
  - Best Flying Wrestler (2006–2007)
  - Non-Heavyweight MVP (2025)
  - Mexico MVP (2023, 2024, 2025)
  - Best Box Office Draw of the Decade (2000–2009)
  - Wrestling Observer Newsletter Hall of Fame (2022)
- WWE
  - Slammy Award for Double Vision Moment of the Year (2011) – with Sin Cara Negro

== Luchas de Apuestas record ==
Winner (wager)	Loser (wager)	Location	Event	Date	Notes
Místico and Volador Jr. (masks)	Antrax and Ébola (hair)	Guadalajara, Jalisco	Live event	October 17, 2004	
Místico (mask)	Black Warrior (mask)	Mexico City, Distrito Federal	CMLL 73rd Anniversary Show	September 29, 2006	
Místico (mask)	El Hijo del Diablo (mask)	Tijuana, Baja California	Live event	December 1, 2006	
Místico (mask)	Sepulturero (mask)	Tlalnepantla de Baz, State of Mexico	Live event	January 27, 2007	
Místico (mask)	Skayde (mask)	Mexico City, Distrito Federal	Live event	April 1, 2007	
Místico (mask)	Misterioso (hair)	Tijuana, Baja California	Live event	October 7, 2007	
Místico (mask)	Negro Casas (hair)	Mexico City, Distrito Federal	CMLL 76th Anniversary Show	September 18, 2009	
Místico (mask)	El Oriental (mask)	Nuevo Laredo, Tamaulipas	Promociones Gutiérrez 1st Anniversary Show	July 12, 2010	(Note: The two were the last team in a five-team Ruleta de la Muerte that also included Atlantis and Olímpico, Averno and Último Guerrero, El Alebrije and Volador Jr., Histeria and La Sombra.)
Sin Cara Azul (mask)	Sin Cara Negro (mask)	Mexico City, Distrito Federal	SmackDown	October 21, 2011	
Carístico (mask)	Revolucion (mask)	Yahaba, Iwate, Japan	6th Fukumen World League	September 19, 2016	(Note: The two met in the finals of Michinoku Pro Wrestling's 6th Fukumen World League tournament.)
Carístico (mask)	Histeria (mask)	Tijuana, Baja California, Mexico	Live event	December 25, 2016	
Carístico (mask)	Black Warrior (hair)	Naucalpan, State of Mexico	Prisión Fatal	July 23, 2017	(Note: Carístico and Black Warrior were the last two wrestlers in a steel cage match that also included Trauma II and Mr. Electro)
Místico (mask/title)	Trevor Lee	Queens, New York	Eric Bischoff's One Shot	December 5, 2024	(Note: Trevor Lee did not wager anything during this match.)
Místico (mask)	MJF (title)	Mexico City, Distrito Federal	CMLL 92nd Anniversary Show	September 19, 2025	
Místico (mask)	Averno (hair)	Mexico City, Distrito Federal	CMLL 93rd Anniversary Show	September 18, 2026	
