= IWRG Intercontinental Super Welterweight Championship =

Professional wrestling championship by International Wrestling Revolution Group

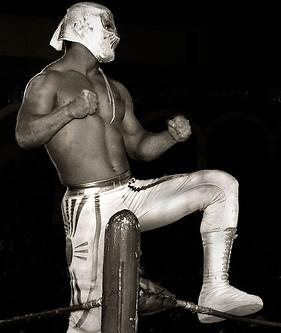
- Místico, the only Super Welterweight Champion ever

Details
- Promotion: International Wrestling Revolution Group
- Date established: November 19, 2006
- Date retired: 2007
Statistics
- Final champion(s): Místico

The IWRG Intercontinental Super Welterweight Championship (Campeonato Intercontinental de Peso Super Welter IWRG in Spanish) is an inactive professional wrestling championship promoted by the Mexican professional wrestling promotion International Wrestling Revolution Group (IWRG). The official definition of the super welterweight weight class in Mexico is between 82 kg (181 lb) and 87 kg (192 lb), but is not always strictly enforced. (Note: One example the weightlimits not being strictly enforced is Mephisto winning the CMLL World Welterweight Championship, a championship with a 78 kg (172 lb) upper limit despite weighing 90 kg (200 lb).)

As it was a professional wrestling championship, the championship was not won not by actual competition, but by a scripted ending to a match determined by the bookers and match makers. (Note: Hornbaker (2016) p. 550: "Professional wrestling is a sport in which match finishes are predetermined. Thus, win–loss records are not indicative of a wrestler's genuine success based on their legitimate abilities – but on now much, or how little they were pushed by promoters") On occasion the promotion declares a championship vacant, which means there is no champion at that point in time. This can either be due to a storyline, (Note: Duncan & Will (2000) p. 271, Chapter: Texas: NWA American Tag Team Title [World Class, Adkisson] "Championship held up and rematch ordered because of the interference of manager Gary Hart") or real life issues such as a champion suffering an injury being unable to defend the championship, (Note: Duncan & Will (2000) p. 20, Chapter: (United States: 19th Century & widely defended titles – NWA, WWF, AWA, IW, ECW, NWA) NWA/WCW TV Title "Rhodes stripped on 85/10/19 for not defending the belt after having his leg broken by Ric Flair and Ole & Arn Anderson") or leaving the company. (Note: Duncan & Will (2000) p. 201, Chapter: (Memphis, Nashville) Memphis: USWA Tag Team Title "Vacant on 93/01/18 when Spike leaves the USWA.")

The first and so far only champion is Místico, who was under contract with Consejo Mundial de Lucha Libre (CMLL) at the time, but worked for IWRG under a talent sharing agreement between the two companies. The talent sharing agreement ended in 2008, but the Super Welterweight Championship has not officially been declared vacant even. It is considered inactive as the IWRG simply does not promote it or refer to it any more.

== Title history ==
Key
No.	Overall reign number
Reign	Reign number for the specific champion
Days	Number of days held
N/A	Unknown information
(NLT)	Championship change took place "no later than" the date listed
†	Championship change is unrecognized by the promotion

No.	Champion	Championship change			Reign statistics		Notes	Ref.
No.	Champion	Date	Event	Location	Reign	Days	Notes	Ref.
1	Místico	November 19, 2006	IWRG show	Naucalpan, State of Mexico	1	(Note: It is not clear exactly when in 2007 IWRG and CMLL stopped working together, making the length of Místico's reign too uncertain to calculate.)	Defeated Black Warrior in the finals of an 8-man championship tournament to become the first champion.	
—	Deactivated	2007	—	—	—	—	IWRG and CMLL stopped working together. Never officially announced as abandoned, just not mentioned.	
