= 1969 in professional wrestling =

1969 in professional wrestling describes the year's events in the world of professional wrestling.

== List of notable promotions ==
Only one promotion held notable shows in 1969.

Promotion Name	Abbreviation
Empresa Mexicana de Lucha Libre	EMLL

== Calendar of notable shows ==
Date	Promotion(s)	Event	Location	Main event
April	EMLL	13. Aniversario de Arena México	Mexico City, Mexico	Black Shadow and Ray Mendoza defeated Los Hippies (Renate Torres and El Vikingo) in a Best two-out-of-three falls Lucha de Apuestas hair vs. hair match
August 15	EMLL	EMLL 36th Anniversary Show	Mexico City, Mexico	El Solitario defeated Rayo de Jalisco (c) in a best two-out-of-three falls match for the NWA World Middleweight Championship
(c) – denotes defending champion(s)

== Championship changes ==
=== EMLL ===
NWA World Light Heavyweight Championship
incoming champion – Ray Mendoza
Date	Winner	Event/Show	Note(s)
December 19	Coloso Colosetti	EMLL show	

NWA World Middleweight Championship
incoming champion – René Guajardo
Date	Winner	Event/Show	Note(s)
April 18	Rayo de Jalisco	EMLL show	
August 15	El Solitario	EMLL 36th Anniversary Show	

NWA World Welterweight Championship
incoming champion – Karloff Lagarde
No title changes

Mexican National Heavyweight Championship
incoming champion – Henry Pilusso
Date	Winner	Event/Show	Note(s)
March 30	Goliath	EMLL show	

Mexican National Middleweight Championship
incoming champion – Alberto Muñoz
Date	Winner	Event/Show	Note(s)
November 20	René Guajardo	EMLL show	

Mexican National Lightweight Championship
incoming champion – Estrella Blanca
Date	Winner	Event/Show	Note(s)
September 20	Rodolfo Ruiz	EMLL show	

Mexican National Light Heavyweight Championship
incoming champion – Vacant
Date	Winner	Event/Show	Note(s)
April 11	Raul Mata	EMLL show	

Mexican National Welterweight Championship
incoming champion – Vacant
Date	Winner	Event/Show	Note(s)
June 14	Huracán Ramírez	EMLL show	
September 5	Karloff Lagarde	EMLL show	

Mexican National Tag Team Championship
incoming champion – Possibly La Ola Blanca
(Ángel Blanco and Dr. Wagner)
No title changes

Mexican National Women's Championship
incoming champion – Uncertain
No title changes

=== NWA ===
NWA Worlds Heavyweight Championship
Incoming Champion – Gene Kiniski
Date	Winner	Event/Show	Note(s)
February 11	Dory Funk Jr.	NWA show	

== Debuts ==
=== Debut Date ===
- February 21 – Osamu Kido
- April 2 - Rusher Kimura
- June – Pantera Sureña
- July 16 – Ivan Putski
- September 20 – Animal Hamaguchi
- November – Fishman

=== Date Unknown ===
- Bob Roop
- Dan Kroffat
- Jimmy Snuka
- Mike George
- Robert Fuller
- Roddy Piper
- Tommy Gilbert
- Vicky Williams
- Villano I
- Villano II
- Sandy Parker
- Miyoko Hoshino (All Japan Women's)
- Hiroko Onishi (All Japan Women's)

== Retirements ==
- Red Berry (1932-1969)

== Births ==
- January 2 – Jimmy Cicero
- January 4 – Reno
- January 7 – Black Warrior (died in 2023)
- January 12 – R. D. Reynolds
- January 13 – John Kronus (died in 2007)
- January 18
  - Dave Bautista
  - Marvin Pope
- January 24 – Pentagón Black
- January 30 – Takaku Fuke
- February 5 – Doug Gilbert
- February 9 – Kaoru
- February 16 – Gangrel
- February 20:
  - Esther Moreno
  - Gedo
- March 13:
  - Masakatsu Funaki
  - Kazuo Takahashi
- March 14 – Beulah McGillicutty
- March 15 – Piratita Morgan(died in 2018)
- April 2 – Rick Fuller
- April 3 – Lance Storm
- April 7 – Droz(died in 2023)
- April 11 – Dustin Rhodes
- April 18 – Pimpinela Escarlata
- April 22 – Kyoko Inoue
- May 8 – Akebono Tarō(died in 2024)
- May 20 – Road Dogg
- May 28 – Etsuko Mita
- May 30 – Lexie Fyfe
- June 5 – Ric Savage
- June 9 – Chip Minton
- June 10 – Morphosis
- June 12 – Héctor Garza(died in 2013)
- June 13 – Headbanger Thrasher
- June 16:
  - Masao Orihara
  - Yuji Yasuraoka
- June 23 – Svetlana Goundarenko
- June 24 – Mad Man Pondo
- June 27 – Mije
- June 28 - Jon Heidenreich
- July 7 – The Great Sasuke
- July 14 – Kazushi Sakuraba
- July 20 – Mike Sanders
- July 27 – Triple H
- July 28 – Brian Johnston
- July 29 – Mike Segura
- July 31 – Kid Kash
- August 17 – Dick Togo
- August 21 – Nathan Jones
- August 26 – Angel Orsini
- September 2 – Joe E. Legend
- September 3 – Marianna Komlos(died in 2004)
- September 17 – Paul Varelans (died in 2021)
- September 20 – Megumi Kudo
- September 24 – Chilly Willy
- September 30 – Chris Von Erich(died in 1991)
- October 7 – Malia Hosaka
- October 9 – Jun Akiyama
- October 16 – Takao Omori
- October 19 – Hido (died in 2021)
- October 22 – Cutie Suzuki
- October 26 – Kurrgan
- October 30 – Alex Porteau
- November 7 – Takako Inoue
- November 18 – Koichiro Kimura (died in 2014)
- November 30 – Conan Stevens
- December 4 – Dynamite Kansai
- December 13 – Emory Hale (died in 2006)
- December 17 – Kiyoshi Tamura
- December 21 – Mauro Ranallo
- December 24 – Brad Anderson
- December 26 – Tom Howard
- December 27 – Chyna(died in 2016)
- December 30 – Nobukazu Hirai

== Deaths ==
- January 9 – Ed McLemore 63
- January 13 – Jim Hady, 38
- January 25 – Frank Scarpa 53
- April 29 – John Foti 41
- July 2 – Iron Mike DiBiase, 45
- August 24 – Fred Kohler, 66
- August 31 – Rocky Marciano, 45
- November 3 – Tonina Jackson, 52
- December 8 – Dick Axman, 78
- December 17 – Frank Hill Murdoch, 60
