= EMLL 35th Anniversary Show =

Mexican Professional wrestling show

- Promotion: Empresa Mexicana de Lucha Libre
- Date: September 20, 1968
- City: Mexico City, Mexico
- Venue: Arena México
- Attendance: 15,000

Event chronology
← Previous; 12. Aniversario de Arena México	Next →: 13. Aniversario de Arena México

EMLL Anniversary Show chronology
← Previous; 34th Anniversary	Next → 36th Anniversary

The EMLL 35th Anniversary Show (Spanish: 35. Aniversario de EMLL) was a professional wrestling major show event produced by Empresa Mexicana de Lucha Libre (EMLL) that took place on September 20, 1968, in Arena México, Mexico City, Mexico. The event commemorated the 35th anniversary of EMLL, which would become the oldest professional wrestling promotion in the world. The Anniversary show is EMLL's biggest show of the year, their Super Bowl event. The EMLL Anniversary Show series is the longest-running annual professional wrestling show, starting in 1934.

== Production ==
=== Background ===
The 1968 Anniversary show commemorated the 35th anniversary of the Mexican professional wrestling company Empresa Mexicana de Lucha Libre (Spanish for "Mexican Wrestling Promotion"; EMLL) holding their first show on September 22, 1933 by promoter and founder Salvador Lutteroth. EMLL was rebranded early in 1992 to become Consejo Mundial de Lucha Libre ("World Wrestling Council"; CMLL) signal their departure from the National Wrestling Alliance. With the sales of the Jim Crockett Promotions to Ted Turner in 1988 EMLL became the oldest, still-operating wrestling promotion in the world. Over the years EMLL/CMLL has on occasion held multiple shows to celebrate their anniversary but since 1977 the company has only held one annual show, which is considered the biggest show of the year, CMLL's equivalent of WWE's WrestleMania or their Super Bowl event. CMLL has held their Anniversary show at Arena México in Mexico City, Mexico since 1956, the year the building was completed, over time Arena México earned the nickname "The Cathedral of Lucha Libre" due to it hosting most of EMLL/CMLL's major events since the building was completed. Traditionally EMLL/CMLL holds their major events on Friday Nights, replacing their regularly scheduled Super Viernes show.

=== Storylines ===
The event featured an undetermined number of professional wrestling matches with different wrestlers involved in pre-existing scripted feuds, plots and storylines. Wrestlers were portrayed as either heels (referred to as rudos in Mexico, those that portray the "bad guys") or faces (técnicos in Mexico, the "good guy" characters) as they followed a series of tension-building events, which culminated in a wrestling match or series of matches. Due to the nature of keeping mainly paper records of wrestling at the time no documentation has been found for some of the matches of the show.

== Event ==
The 35th EMLL anniversary show featured an unknown number of matches, traditionally EMLL has five to six matches per show, but at times have had more or less and the total number has not been verified. This was the first EMLL wrestling event back in Arena México after it was used as part of the 1968 Summer Olympics, hosting the boxing events. In one of three verified matches the team of El Santo and Ray Mendoza defeated La Ola Blanca ("the White Wave"; Ángel Blanco and Dr. Wagner) to win the Arena Mexico Tag Team championship, a secondary title ranked lower than the Mexican National Tag Team Championship. NWA World Middleweight Champion Rene Guajardo was successful in his title defense against British born Tony Oxford. In the main event Blue Demon challenged Karloff Lagarde for the NWA World Welterweight Championship, but ended up losing to Lagarde two falls to one.

== Results ==
No.	Results	Stipulations
1	El Santo and Ray Mendoza (c) defeated La Ola Blanca (Ángel Blanco and Dr. Wagner)	Best two-out-of-three falls Tag team match for the Arena Mexico Tag Team Championship
2	René Guajardo (c) defeated Tony Oxford	Best two-out-of-three falls match for the NWA World Middleweight Championship
3	Karloff Lagarde (c) defeated Blue Demon	Best two-out-of-three falls match for the NWA World Welterweight Championship
(c) / – the champion(s) heading into the match
