= Aniversario de Arena México =

List of Mexican Professional wrestling shows

The Aniversario de Arena México (Spanish for "Arena México Anniversary") show is an annual major professional wrestling show produced by Consejo Mundial de Lucha Libre (CMLL) to commemorate the opening of Arena México, the promotion's main venue, in 1956. The event usually takes place in April with very few exceptions in place of the promotion's regular Friday Night Super Viernes series of shows. Detailed results of a number of older events have not been found and in some cases no results or planned matches have been found documented, leading only to the knowledge that an event probably took place, but no confirmation of date or other details were found. The most recent show was the 63. Aniversario de Arena México show that took place on April 26, 2019. Up until 1991 CMLL operated under the name Empresa Mexicana de Lucha Libre (EMLL) or some times as NWA-EMLL, to promote their association with the National Wrestling Alliance (NWA) that ended in 1991 and prompted the name change.

== Events and dates ==
Event	Date	Main event	Source
1. Aniversario de Arena México	1957	Unknown	
2. Aniversario de Arena México	1958	Unknown	
3. Aniversario de Arena México	1959	Unknown	
4. Aniversario de Arena México	1960	Unknown	
5. Aniversario de Arena México	1961	Unknown	
6. Aniversario de Arena México	1962	Unknown	
7. Aniversario de Arena México	1963	Unknown	
8. Aniversario de Arena México	1964	Unknown	
9. Aniversario de Arena México	April 3, 1965	Rizado Ruiz (c) vs. Huracán Ramírez for the Mexican National Welterweight Championship	
10. Aniversario de Arena México	1966	Unknown	
11. Aniversario de Arena México	1967	Unknown	
12. Aniversario de Arena México	April 26, 1968	Huracán Ramírez vs. El Enfermero, Lucha de Apuestas mask vs. mask match	
13. Aniversario de Arena México	April 18, 1969	Black Shadow and Ray Mendoza vs. Los Hippies (Renate Torres and El Vikingo), Lucha de Apuestas hair vs. hair match	
14. Aniversario de Arena México	April 24, 1970	Coloso Colosetti (c) vs. Ray Mendoza for the NWA World Light Heavyweight Championship	
15. Aniversario de Arena México	1971	Unknown	
16. Aniversario de Arena México	April 21, 1972	David Morgan (c) vs. Ray Mendoza for the NWA World Light Heavyweight Championship	
17. Aniversario de Arena México	1973	Unknown	
18. Aniversario de Arena México	April 24, 1974	Aníbal and Steve Wright vs. Rene Guajardo and Tigre Colombiano, Lucha de Apuestas mask and hair vs. mask and hair match	
19. Aniversario de Arena México	May 24, 1975	Perro Aguayo vs. Ray Mendoza, Lucha de Apuestas hair vs. hair match	
20. Aniversario de Arena México	April 23, 1976	Fishman vs. El Faraón, Lucha de Apuestas hair vs. hair match	
21. Aniversario de Arena México	April 27, 1977	Alfonso Dantés vs. Chavo Guerrero (c) for the NWA World Light Heavyweight Championship	
22. Aniversario de Arena México	April 21, 1978	El Faraón and Ringo Mendoza vs. Alfonso Dantés and Sangre Chicana, Lucha de Apuestas hair vs. hair match	
23. Aniversario de Arena México	April 21, 1979	Pak Choo (c) vs. Alfonso Dantés for the NWA World Light Heavyweight Championship	
24. Aniversario de Arena México	April 7, 1980	El Faraón and Ringo Mendoza vs. Adorable Rubí and El Nazi, Lucha de Apuestas hair vs. hair match	
25. Aniversario de Arena México	April 3, 1981	Alfonso Dantés (c) vs. Tony Salazar in a Best two-out-of-three falls match for the NWA World Light Heavyweight Championship	
26. Aniversario de Arena México	April 2, 1982	David Morgan (c) vs. Máscara Año 2000 in a Best two-out-of-three falls match for the NWA World Middleweight Championship	
27. Aniversario de Arena México	April 22, 1983	Super Halcón vs. Pirata Morgan in a Best two-out-of-three falls match for the Mexican National Heavyweight Championship	
28. Aniversario de Arena México	April 8, 1984	Super Halcón vs. Pirata Morgan, Lucha de Apuestas hair vs. hair match	
29. Aniversario de Arena México	April 5, 1985	Pirata Morgan vs. El Egipcio, Lucha de Apuestas hair vs. hair match	
30. Aniversario de Arena México	1986	Unknown	
31. Aniversario de Arena México	April 12, 1987	Cien Caras vs. Siglo XX, Lucha de Apuestas mask vs. mask match	
32. Aniversario de Arena México	1988	Unknown	
33. Aniversario de Arena México	April 28, 1989	Emilio Charles Jr. (c) vs. Ángel Azteca for the NWA World Middleweight Championship	
34. Aniversario de Arena México	1990	Unknown	
35. Aniversario de Arena México	1991	Unknown	
36. Aniversario de Arena México	April 3, 1992	Blue Panther vs. American Love Machine, Lucha de Apuestas mask vs. mask match	
37. Aniversario de Arena México	April 2, 1993	Dr. Wagner Jr. vs. Pierroth Jr. (c) for the CMLL World Light Heavyweight Championship	
38. Aniversario de Arena México	April 15, 1994	Emilio Charles Jr. vs. La Fiera, Best two-out-of-three falls Lucha de Apuestas hair vs. hair match	
39. Aniversario de Arena México	April 7, 1995	Héctor Garza vs. El Satánico, Lucha de Apuestas hair vs. hair match	
40. Aniversario de Arena México	April 19, 1996	Rayo de Jalisco Jr., Mil Máscaras and Tinieblas vs. Dr. Wagner Jr., El Canek and Emilio Charles Jr.	
41. Aniversario de Arena México	April 18, 1997	Steele vs. Rayo de Jalisco Jr. (c) in a Best two out of three falls match for the CMLL World Heavyweight Championship	
42. Aniversario de Arena México	April 24, 1998	Gran Markus Jr. vs. Brazo de Oro, Lucha de Apuestas hair vs. hair match	
43. Aniversario de Arena México	April 2, 1999	Hijo del Santo and Negro Casas vs. Bestia Salvaje and Scorpio Jr. for the CMLL World Tag Team Championship	
44. Aniversario de Arena México	April 14, 2000	Perro Aguayo vs. Bestia Salvaje, Lucha de Apuestas hair vs. hair match	
45. Aniversario de Arena México	April 13, 2001	Dr. Wagner Jr., El Satánico and Negro Casas vs. Hijo del Santo, Emilio Charles Jr. and Último Guerrero	
46. Aniversario de Arena México	April 12, 2002	Dr. Wagner Jr., Giganté Silva and Shocker vs. El Puma Inoue, Gigante Singh and Shibata	
47. Aniversario de Arena México	April 4, 2003	Shocker vs. Vampiro Canadiense, Lucha de Apuestas hair vs. hair match	
48. Aniversario de Arena México	April 30, 2004	Damian El Terrible vs. Máscara Mágica, Lucha de Apuestas hair vs. hair match	
49. Aniversario de Arena México	April 8, 2005	Los Perros del Mal (Damián 666, Halloween and Pierroth) vs. Dr. Wagner Jr., Místico and Negro Casas	
50. Aniversario de Arena México	April 28, 2006	Los Guerreros de la Atlantida (Rey Bucanero and Tarzan Boy) vs.Los Perros del Mal (Damián 666 and Mr. Águila), Lucha de Apuestas hair vs. hair match	
51. Aniversario de Arena México	April 13, 2007	Místico and Negro Casas (c) vs. Los Perros del Mal (Mr. Águila and Perro Aguayo Jr.) for the CMLL World Tag Team Championship	
52. Aniversario de Arena México	April 18, 2008	Héctor Garza and Místico (c) vs. Los Perros del Mal (Averno and Mephisto) for the CMLL World Tag Team Championship	
53. Aniversario de Arena México	April 12, 2009	Negro Casas (c) vs. Místico in a Best two out of three falls match for the CMLL World Welterweight Championship	
54. Aniversario de Arena México	April 16, 2010	El Felino vs. Místico in a Best two-out-of-three falls match	
55. Aniversario de Arena México	April 29, 2011	La Mascara, La Sombra and Rush vs. La Peste Negra (Mr. Niebla and Negro Casas) and Averno	
56. Aniversario de Arena México	April 27, 2012	El Bufete del Amor (Marco Corleone, Maximo and Rush) (c) vs. La Fuerza TRT (El Terrible, Rey Bucanero and Tiger) for the CMLL World Trios Championship	
57. Aniversario de Arena México	April 1, 2013	Último Guerrero, Volador Jr. and El Terrible vs. Máscara Dorada, Rush and La Sombra	
58. Aniversario de Arena México	April 27, 2014	Atlantis, La Sombra and Místico vs. Los Revolucionarios del Terror (Dragón Rojo Jr., Pólvora and Rey Escorpión)	
59. Aniversario de Arena México	April 26, 2015	Marco Corleone vs. La Sombra vs. Pólvora vs. Barbaro Cavernario vs. Dragon Lee vs. Kamaitachi vs. La Máscara vs. Ripper vs. Morphosis vs. Titán	
60. Aniversario de Arena México	April 29, 2016	Místico and Mephisto vs. Carístico and Cibernético	
61. Aniversario de Arena México	April 28, 2017	La Máscara vs. Volador Jr.	
62. Aniversario de Arena México	April 27, 2018	Atlantis, Místico and Volador Jr. vs. Bárbaro Cavernario, Negro Casas and Último Guerrero	
63. Aniversario de Arena México	April 26, 2019	Bárbaro Cavernario and Titán vs. Último Guerrero and Volador Jr. in a Best two-out-of-three falls match tournament final for the Torneo Increible de Parejas	
64. Aniversario de Arena México	N/A	No event held due to the COVID-19 pandemic	
65. Aniversario de Arena México	April 24, 2021	Atlantis, Euforia and Volador Jr. vs. Bárbaro Cavernario, Gran Guerrero and Último Guerrero	
66. Aniversario de Arena México	April 29, 2022	Titán vs. Templario vs. Místico in a miniature tournament final for the CMLL Universal Championship	
67. Aniversario de Arena México	April 28, 2023	Templario vs. Atlantis Jr. vs. Dragón Rojo Jr. in an elimination three-way match tournament final for the CMLL Universal Championship	
68. Aniversario de Arena México	April 26, 2024	Máscara Dorada vs. Titán vs. Magnus in an elimination three-way match tournament final for the CMLL Universal Championship	
69. Aniversario de Arena México	April 25, 2025	Titán vs. Esfinge vs. Ángel de Oro in an elimination three-way match tournament final for the CMLL Universal Championship	
70. Aniversario de Arena México	April 24, 2026	Máscara Dorada vs. Hechicero vs. Black Tiger in a three-way match tournament final for the CMLL Universal Championship	

== 9. Aniversario de Arena México ==
9. Aniversario de Arena México
- Promotion: Empresa Mexicana de Lucha Libre
- Date: April 3, 1965
- City: Mexico City, Mexico
- Venue: Arena México
- Attendance: 17,800

Event chronology
← Previous; EMLL Carnaval de Campeones	Next → EMLL 32nd Anniversary Show

Aniversario de Arena México chronology
← Previous; 8. Aniversario	Next →: 10. Aniversario

The 9. Aniversario de Arena México (Spanish for "Arena México 9th Anniversary") show was a major professional wrestling show produced by Empresa Mexicana de Lucha Libre (EMLL) to commemorate the opening of Arena México, the promotion's main venue, in 1956. The event took place on April 3, 1965, as part of a special Friday Night Super Viernes series of shows.

Results

No.	Results	Stipulations
1	Huracán Ramírez defeated Rizado Ruiz (c)	Singles match for the Mexican National Welterweight Championship
(c) / – the champion(s) heading into the match

== 12. Aniversario de Arena México ==
12. Aniversario de Arena México
- Promotion: Empresa Mexicana de Lucha Libre
- Date: April 26, 1968
- City: Mexico City, Mexico
- Venue: Arena México
- Attendance: 17,500

Event chronology
← Previous; EMLL 34th Anniversary Show	Next → EMLL 35th Anniversary Show

Aniversario de Arena México chronology
← Previous; 11. Aniversario	Next →: 13. Aniversario

The 12. Aniversario de Arena México (Spanish for "Arena México 12th Anniversary") show was a major professional wrestling show produced by Empresa Mexicana de Lucha Libre (EMLL) to commemorate the opening of Arena México, the promotion's main venue, in 1956. The event took place on April 26, 1968, as part of a special Friday Night Super Viernes series of shows.

Results

No.	Results	Stipulations
1	Huracán Ramírez defeated El Enfermero	Best two-out-of-three falls Lucha de Apuestas mask vs. mask match

== 13. Aniversario de Arena México ==
13. Aniversario de Arena México
- Promotion: Empresa Mexicana de Lucha Libre
- Date: April 18, 1969
- City: Mexico City, Mexico
- Venue: Arena México
- Attendance: 17,000

Event chronology
← Previous; EMLL 35th Anniversary Show	Next → EMLL 36th Anniversary Show

Aniversario de Arena México chronology
← Previous; 12. Aniversario	Next →: 14. Aniversario

The 13. Aniversario de Arena México (Spanish for "Arena México 12th Anniversary") show was a major professional wrestling show produced by Empresa Mexicana de Lucha Libre (EMLL) to commemorate the opening of Arena México, the promotion's main venue, in 1956. The event took place on April 18, 1969, as part of a special Friday Night Super Viernes series of shows.

Results

No.	Results	Stipulations
1	Rayo de Jalisco defeated El Santo (C)	Best two-out-of-three falls match for the NWA World Middleweight Championship
2	Black Shadow and Ray Mendoza defeated Los Hippies (Renate Torres and El Vikingo)	Best two-out-of-three falls Lucha de Apuestas hair vs. hair match

== 14. Aniversario de Arena México ==
14. Aniversario de Arena México
- Promotion: Empresa Mexicana de Lucha Libre
- Date: April 24, 1970
- City: Mexico City, Mexico
- Venue: Arena México
- Attendance: 17,800

Event chronology
← Previous; EMLL 36th Anniversary Show	Next → EMLL 37th Anniversary Show

Aniversario de Arena México chronology
← Previous; 13. Aniversario	Next →: 15. Aniversario

The 14. Aniversario de Arena México (Spanish for "Arena México 14th Anniversary") show was a major professional wrestling show produced by Empresa Mexicana de Lucha Libre (EMLL) to commemorate the opening of Arena México, the promotion's main venue, in 1956. The event took place on April 24, 1970, as part of a special Friday Night Super Viernes series of shows.

Results

No.	Results	Stipulations
1	Tony Reina defeated Golden Boy	Singles match
2	Cesar Valentino defeated Espectro II	Singles match
3	Angel Blanco Jr. defeated Len Hurst	Singles match
4	Rene Guajardo defeated Dory Dixon	Singles match
5	Blue Demon and El Santo defeated Mr. Koma and Yamamoto	Best two-out-of-three falls tag team match
6	Los Hippies (El Vikingo and Renato Torres) defeated Antonio Posa and Mike Barns	Best two-out-of-three falls Lucha de Apuestas hair vs. hair match
7	Ray Mendoza defeated Coloso Colosetti (c)	Best two-out-of-three falls match for the NWA World Light Heavyweight Championship
(c) / – the champion(s) heading into the match

== 16. Aniversario de Arena México ==
16. Aniversario de Arena México
- Promotion: Empresa Mexicana de Lucha Libre
- Date: April 21, 1972
- City: Mexico City, Mexico
- Venue: Arena México
- Attendance: 17,500

Event chronology
← Previous; EMLL 38th Anniversary Show	Next → EMLL 39th Anniversary Show (1)

Aniversario de Arena México chronology
← Previous; 15. Aniversario	Next →: 17. Aniversario

The 16. Aniversario de Arena México (Spanish for "Arena México 16th Anniversary") show was a major professional wrestling show produced by Empresa Mexicana de Lucha Libre (EMLL) to commemorate the opening of Arena México, the promotion's main venue, in 1956. The event took place on April 21, 1972, as part of a special Friday Night Super Viernes series of shows.

Results

No.	Results	Stipulations
1	Ray Mendoza defeated David Morgan (c)	Singles match for the NWA World Light Heavyweight Championship
(c) / – the champion(s) heading into the match

== 18. Aniversario de Arena México ==
18. Aniversario de Arena México
- Promotion: Empresa Mexicana de Lucha Libre
- Date: April 24, 1974
- City: Mexico City, Mexico
- Venue: Arena México
- Attendance: 17,500

Event chronology
← Previous; EMLL 40th Anniversary Show	Next → EMLL 41st Anniversary Show

Aniversario de Arena México chronology
← Previous; 17. Aniversario	Next →: 19. Aniversario

The 18. Aniversario de Arena México (Spanish for "Arena México 18th Anniversary") show was a major professional wrestling show produced by Empresa Mexicana de Lucha Libre (EMLL) to commemorate the opening of Arena México, the promotion's main venue, in 1956. The event took place on April 24, 1974, as part of a special Friday Night Super Viernes series of shows.

Results

No.	Results	Stipulations
1	Aníbal and Steve Wright defeated Rene Guajardo and Tigre Colombiano	Best two-out-of-three falls Lucha de Apuestas mask and hair vs. mask and hair match

== 19. Aniversario de Arena México ==
19. Aniversario de Arena México
- Promotion: Empresa Mexicana de Lucha Libre
- Date: May 24, 1975
- City: Mexico City, Mexico
- Venue: Arena México
- Attendance: 17,500

Event chronology
← Previous; EMLL 41st Anniversary Show	Next → EMLL 42nd Anniversary Show (1)

Aniversario de Arena México chronology
← Previous; 18. Aniversario	Next →: 20. Aniversario

The 19. Aniversario de Arena México (Spanish for "Arena México 19th Anniversary") show was a major professional wrestling show produced by Empresa Mexicana de Lucha Libre (EMLL) to commemorate the opening of Arena México, the promotion's main venue, in 1956. The event took place on May 25, 1975, as part of a special Friday Night Super Viernes series of shows. The 19. Anniversario show was one of the few Aniversario shows not held in April.

Results

No.	Results	Stipulations
1	Perro Aguayo defeated Ray Mendoza	Best two-out-of-three falls Lucha de Apuestas hair vs. hair match

== 20. Aniversario de Arena México ==
20. Aniversario de Arena México
- Promotion: Empresa Mexicana de Lucha Libre
- Date: April 23, 1976
- City: Mexico City, Mexico
- Venue: Arena México
- Attendance: 17,500

Event chronology
← Previous; EMLL 42nd Anniversary Show (3)	Next → EMLL 43rd Anniversary Show

Aniversario de Arena México chronology
← Previous; 19. Aniversario	Next →: 21. Aniversario

The 20. Aniversario de Arena México (Spanish for "Arena México 20th Anniversary") show was a major professional wrestling show produced by Empresa Mexicana de Lucha Libre (EMLL) to commemorate the opening of Arena México, the promotion's main venue, in 1956. The event took place on April 23, 1976, as part of a special Friday Night Super Viernes series of shows.

Results

No.	Results	Stipulations
1	Manuel Robles defeated Estrella Blanca	Singles match
2	Carlos Plata defeated Karloff Lagarde	Singles match
3	Enrique Vera and Mano Negra defeated Los Gemelos Diablos (Gemelo Diablo I and Gemelo Diablo II)	Best two-out-of-three falls tag team match
4	El Halcón and El Santo defeated Adorable Rubi and Alfonso Dantés	Best two-out-of-three falls tag team match
5	Perro Aguayo (c) defeated Ringo Mendoza	Best two-out-of-three falls match for the NWA World Middleweight Championship
6	Fishman defeated El Faraón	Best two-out-of-three falls Lucha de Apuestas mask vs. mask match
(c) / – the champion(s) heading into the match

== 21. Aniversario de Arena México ==
21. Aniversario de Arena México
- Promotion: Empresa Mexicana de Lucha Libre
- Date: April 21, 1977
- City: Mexico City, Mexico
- Venue: Arena México
- Attendance: 17,500

Event chronology
← Previous; EMLL 43rd Anniversary Show	Next → EMLL 44th Anniversary Show (1)

Aniversario de Arena México chronology
← Previous; 20. Aniversario	Next →: 22. Aniversario

The 20. Aniversario de Arena México (Spanish for "Arena México 20th Anniversary") show was a major professional wrestling show produced by Empresa Mexicana de Lucha Libre (EMLL) to commemorate the opening of Arena México, the promotion's main venue, in 1956. The event took place on April 21, 1977, as part of a special Friday Night Super Viernes series of shows.

Results

No.	Results	Stipulations
1	Alfonso Dantés defeated Chavo Guerrero (c)	Singles match for the NWA World Light Heavyweight Championship
(c) / – the champion(s) heading into the match

== 22. Aniversario de Arena México ==
22. Aniversario de Arena México
- Promotion: Empresa Mexicana de Lucha Libre
- Date: April 21, 1978
- City: Mexico City, Mexico
- Venue: Arena México
- Attendance: 17,500

Event chronology
← Previous; EMLL 44th Anniversary Show (1)	Next → EMLL 45th Anniversary Show

Aniversario de Arena México chronology
← Previous; 21. Aniversario	Next →: 23. Aniversario

The 22. Aniversario de Arena México (Spanish for "Arena México 22nd Anniversary") show was a major professional wrestling show produced by Empresa Mexicana de Lucha Libre (EMLL) to commemorate the opening of Arena México, the promotion's main venue, in 1956. The event took place on April 21, 1978, as part of a special Friday Night Super Viernes series of shows.

Results

No.	Results	Stipulations
1	El Impostor defeated Leo Lopez	Singles match
2	El Monarca defeated Demonio Blanco	Singles match
3	Enrique Vera and Tony Salazar vs. Los Gemelos Diablos (Gemelo Diablo I and Gemelo Diablo II) ended in a draw	Best two-out-of-three falls tag team match
4	Blue Demon and Mano Negra defeated Fishman and Perro Aguayo by disqualification	Best two-out-of-three falls tag team match
5	Harley Race (c) defeated Super Halcón	Best two-out-of-three falls match for the NWA World Heavyweight Championship
6	El Faraón and Ringo Mendoza defeated Alfonso Dantés and Sangre Chicana	Best two-out-of-three falls Lucha de Apuestas hair vs. hair match
(c) / – the champion(s) heading into the match

== 23. Aniversario de Arena México ==
23. Aniversario de Arena México
- Promotion: Empresa Mexicana de Lucha Libre
- Date: April 21, 1979
- City: Mexico City, Mexico
- Venue: Arena México
- Attendance: 17,500

Event chronology
← Previous; EMLL 45th Anniversary Show	Next → EMLL 46th Anniversary Show

Aniversario de Arena México chronology
← Previous; 22. Aniversario	Next →: 24. Aniversario

The 23. Aniversario de Arena México (Spanish for "Arena México 23rd Anniversary") show was a major professional wrestling show produced by Empresa Mexicana de Lucha Libre (EMLL) to commemorate the opening of Arena México, the promotion's main venue, in 1956. The event took place on April 21, 1979, as part of a special Friday Night Super Viernes series of shows.

Results

No.	Results	Stipulations
1	Alfonso Dantés defeated Pak Choo (c)	Singles match for the NWA World Light Heavyweight Championship
(c) / – the champion(s) heading into the match

== 24. Aniversario de Arena México ==
24. Aniversario de Arena México
- Promotion: Empresa Mexicana de Lucha Libre
- Date: April 7, 1980
- City: Mexico City, Mexico
- Venue: Arena México
- Attendance: 17,000

Event chronology
← Previous; EMLL 46th Anniversary Show	Next → EMLL 47th Anniversary Show

Aniversario de Arena México chronology
← Previous; 23. Aniversario	Next →: 25. Aniversario

The 24. Aniversario de Arena México (Spanish for "Arena México 24th Anniversary") show was a major professional wrestling show produced by Empresa Mexicana de Lucha Libre (EMLL) to commemorate the opening of Arena México, the promotion's main venue, in 1956. The event took place on April 4, 1980, as part of a special Friday Night Super Viernes series of shows.

Results

No.	Results	Stipulations
1	El Faraón and Ringo Mendoza defeated Adorable Rubí and El Nazi	Best two-out-of-three falls Lucha de Apuestas hair vs. hair match

== 25. Aniversario de Arena México ==
25. Aniversario de Arena México
- Promotion: Empresa Mexicana de Lucha Libre
- Date: April 3, 1981
- City: Mexico City, Mexico
- Venue: Arena México
- Attendance: 17,500

Event chronology
← Previous; Juicio Final	Next → EMLL 48th Anniversary Show

Aniversario de Arena México chronology
← Previous; 24. Aniversario	Next →: 26. Aniversario

The 25. Aniversario de Arena México (Spanish for "Arena México 25th Anniversary") show was a major professional wrestling show produced by Empresa Mexicana de Lucha Libre (EMLL) to commemorate the opening of Arena México, the promotion's main venue, in 1956. The event took place on April 3, 1981, as part of a special Friday Night Super Viernes series of shows.

Results

No.	Results	Stipulations
1	Ringo Mendoza defeated Sangre Chicana (c)	Best two-out-of-three falls match for the NWA World Middleweight Championship
2	Américo Rocca and Divino Roy defeated Águila India and Gran Cochisse	Best two-out-of-three falls Lucha de Apuestas hair vs. hair match
3	Tony Salazar defeated Alfonso Dantés (c)	Best two-out-of-three falls match for the NWA World Light Heavyweight Championship
(c) / – the champion(s) heading into the match

== 26. Aniversario de Arena México ==
26. Aniversario de Arena México
- Promotion: Empresa Mexicana de Lucha Libre
- Date: April 2, 1982
- City: Mexico City, Mexico
- Venue: Arena México
- Attendance: 17,500

Event chronology
← Previous; Juicio Final	Next → EMLL 49th Anniversary Show

Aniversario de Arena México chronology
← Previous; 25. Aniversario	Next →: 27. Aniversario

The 26. Aniversario de Arena México (Spanish for "Arena México 26th Anniversary") show was a major professional wrestling show produced by Empresa Mexicana de Lucha Libre (EMLL) to commemorate the opening of Arena México, the promotion's main venue, in 1956. The event took place on April 2, 1982, as part of a special Friday Night Super Viernes series of shows.

Results

No.	Results	Stipulations
1	César Curiel defeated El Faraón (c)	Best two-out-of-three falls match for the NWA World Middleweight Championship
2	Máscara Año 2000 defeated David Morgan (c)	Best two-out-of-three falls match for the NWA World Light Heavyweight Championship
(c) / – the champion(s) heading into the match

== 27. Aniversario de Arena México ==
27. Aniversario de Arena México
- Promotion: Empresa Mexicana de Lucha Libre
- Date: April 22, 1983
- City: Mexico City, Mexico
- Venue: Arena México
- Attendance: 17,500

Event chronology
← Previous; Juicio Final	Next → EMLL 50th Anniversary Show

Aniversario de Arena México chronology
← Previous; 26. Aniversario	Next →: 28. Aniversario

The 27. Aniversario de Arena México (Spanish for "Arena México 27th Anniversary") show was a major professional wrestling show produced by Empresa Mexicana de Lucha Libre (EMLL) to commemorate the opening of Arena México, the promotion's main venue, in 1956. The event took place on April 22, 1983, as part of a special Friday Night Super Viernes series of shows.

Results

No.	Results	Stipulations
1	El Fantasma, Javier Llanes and Rey Salomon defeated Belcebu, Jerry Estrada and Tierra Viento y Fuego	Six-man "Lucha Libre rules" tag team match
2	El Supremo, Fishman and Talisman defeated Américo Rocca, El Jalisco and Franco Colombo	Six-man "Lucha Libre rules" tag team match
3	El Solitario, Lizmark and Villano III defeated El Satánico, La Fiera and Mocho Cota	Six-man "Lucha Libre rules" tag team match
4	Cachorro Mendoza defeated El Salvaje	Best two-out-of-three falls Lucha de Apuestas hair vs. hair match
5	Tony Salazar defeated Coloso Colosetti	Best two-out-of-three falls Lucha de Apuestas hair vs. hair match
6	Super Halcón (c) defeated Pirata Morgan	Best two-out-of-three falls match for the Mexican National Heavyweight Championship
(c) / – the champion(s) heading into the match

== 28. Aniversario de Arena México ==
28. Aniversario de Arena México
- Promotion: Empresa Mexicana de Lucha Libre
- Date: April 8, 1984
- City: Mexico City, Mexico
- Venue: Arena México
- Attendance: 17,000-18,000

Event chronology
← Previous; Juicio Final	Next → EMLL 51st Anniversary Show

Aniversario de Arena México chronology
← Previous; 27. Aniversario	Next →: 29. Aniversario

The 28. Aniversario de Arena México (Spanish for "Arena México 28th Anniversary") show was a major professional wrestling show produced by Empresa Mexicana de Lucha Libre (EMLL) to commemorate the opening of Arena México, the promotion's main venue, in 1956. The event took place on April 8, 1984, as part of a special Friday Night Super Viernes series of shows.

Results

No.	Results	Stipulations
1	Super Halcón defeated Pirata Morgan	Best two-out-of-three falls Lucha de Apuestas hair vs. hair match

== 29. Aniversario de Arena México ==
29. Aniversario de Arena México
- Promotion: Empresa Mexicana de Lucha Libre
- Date: April 5, 1985
- City: Mexico City, Mexico
- Venue: Arena México
- Attendance: 17,500

Event chronology
← Previous; Juicio Final	Next → EMLL 52nd Anniversary Show

Aniversario de Arena México chronology
← Previous; 28. Aniversario	Next →: 30. Aniversario

The 29. Aniversario de Arena México (Spanish for "Arena México 29th Anniversary") show was a major professional wrestling show produced by Empresa Mexicana de Lucha Libre (EMLL) to commemorate the opening of Arena México, the promotion's main venue, in 1956. The event took place on April 5, 1985, as part of a special Friday Night Super Viernes series of shows.

Results

No.	Results	Stipulations
1	Los Destructores (Tony Arce and Vulcano) defeated El Dorado and El Solar II	Best two-out-of-three falls tag team match
2	Angel Blanco Jr., El Supremo and Herodes defeated Hombre Bala, Rino Castro and Stuka by disqualification	Six-man "Lucha Libre rules" tag team match
3	Los Brazos (Brazo de Oro and Brazo de Plata) and Impacto defeated Espectro de Ultratumba, Espectro Jr. and Jerry Estrada by disqualification	Six-man "Lucha Libre rules" tag team match
4	Cien Caras, Mocho Cota and Sangre Chicana defeated Alfonso Dantés, Cachorro Mendoza and Ringo Mendoza	Six-man "Lucha Libre rules" tag team match
5	La Fiera defeated Gran Hamada (c)	Best two-out-of-three falls match for the NWA World Light Heavyweight Championship
6	Pirata Morgan defeated El Egipcio by disqualification	Best two-out-of-three falls Lucha de Apuestas hair vs. hair match
(c) / – the champion(s) heading into the match

== 31. Aniversario de Arena México ==
31. Aniversario de Arena México
- Promotion: Empresa Mexicana de Lucha Libre
- Date: April 12, 1987
- City: Mexico City, Mexico
- Venue: Arena México
- Attendance: 17,500

Event chronology
← Previous; Juicio Final	Next → EMLL 54th Anniversary Show

Aniversario de Arena México chronology
← Previous; 30. Aniversario	Next →: 32. Aniversario

The 31. Aniversario de Arena México (Spanish for "Arena México 31st Anniversary") show was a major professional wrestling show produced by Empresa Mexicana de Lucha Libre (EMLL) to commemorate the opening of Arena México, the promotion's main venue, in 1956. The event took place on April 12, 1987, as part of a special Friday Night Super Viernes series of shows.

Results

No.	Results	Stipulations
1	Cien Caras defeated Siglo XX	Best two-out-of-three falls Lucha de Apuestas hair vs. hair match

== 33. Aniversario de Arena México ==
33. Aniversario de Arena México
- Promotion: Empresa Mexicana de Lucha Libre
- Date: April 28, 1989
- City: Mexico City, Mexico
- Venue: Arena México
- Attendance: 17,500

Event chronology
← Previous; Juicio Final	Next → EMLL 56th Anniversary Show

Aniversario de Arena México chronology
← Previous; 32. Aniversario	Next →: 34. Aniversario

The 33. Aniversario de Arena México (Spanish for "Arena México 33rd Anniversary") show was a major professional wrestling show produced by Empresa Mexicana de Lucha Libre (EMLL) to commemorate the opening of Arena México, the promotion's main venue, in 1956. The event took place on April 28, 1989, as part of a special Friday Night Super Viernes series of shows.

Results

No.	Results	Stipulations
1	Ángel Azteca defeated Emilio Charles Jr. (c)	Best two-out-of-three falls match for the NWA World Middleweight Championship
(c) / – the champion(s) heading into the match

== 36. Aniversario de Arena México ==
36. Aniversario de Arena México
- Promotion: Consejo Mundial de Lucha Libre
- Date: April 3, 1992
- City: Mexico City, Mexico
- Venue: Arena México
- Attendance: 18.000

Event chronology
← Previous; Juicio Final	Next → CMLL 59th Anniversary Show

Aniversario de Arena México chronology
← Previous; 35. Aniversario	Next →: 37. Aniversario

The 36. Aniversario de Arena México (Spanish for "Arena México 36th Anniversary") show was a major professional wrestling show produced by Consejo Mundial de Lucha Libre (CMLL) to commemorate the opening of Arena México, the promotion's main venue, in 1956. The event took place on April 3, 1992, as part of a special Friday Night Super Viernes series of shows. The 36. Aniversario show was the first Arena México Aniversario show promoted under the CMLL name, having previously used the name "Empresa Mexicana de Lucha Libre" (EMLL).

Results

No.	Results	Stipulations
1	Los Intocables (Jaque Mate, Masakre and Pierroth Jr.) defeated Apolo Dantés, Máscara Sagrada and Octagón	Six-man "Lucha Libre rules" tag team match
2	Rayo de Jalisco Jr., Konnan El Barbaro and Perro Aguayo defeated Los Hermanos Dinamita (Cien Caras, Máscara Año 2000 and Universo 2000)	Six-man "Lucha Libre rules" tag team match
3	Atlantis (c) defeated La Fiera	Best two-out-of-three falls match for the NWA World Middleweight Championship
4	Blue Panther defeated American Love Machine by disqualification	Best two-out-of-three falls Lucha de Apuestas mask vs. mask match
(c) / – the champion(s) heading into the match

== 37. Aniversario de Arena México ==
37. Aniversario de Arena México
- Promotion: Consejo Mundial de Lucha Libre
- Date: April 2, 1993
- City: Mexico City, Mexico
- Venue: Arena México
- Attendance: 17,500

Event chronology
← Previous; CMLL 59th Anniversary Show	Next → CMLL 60th Anniversary Show

Aniversario de Arena México chronology
← Previous; 36. Aniversario	Next →: 38. Aniversario

The 37. Aniversario de Arena México (Spanish for "Arena México 37th Anniversary") show was a major professional wrestling show produced by Consejo Mundial de Lucha Libre (CMLL) to commemorate the opening of Arena México, the promotion's main venue, in 1956. The event took place on April 2, 1993, as part of a special Friday Night Super Viernes series of shows. The 36. Aniversario show was the first Arena México Aniversario show promoted under the CMLL name, having previously used the name "Empresa Mexicana de Lucha Libre" (EMLL).

Results

No.	Results	Stipulations
1	Los Guerreros Del Futuro (Damián el Guerrero, Guerrero del Futuro and Guerrero Maya) defeated Bronce, Olimpus and Trueno	Six-man "Lucha Libre rules" tag team match
2	El Felino, Gedo and Jado defeated Ciclón Ramirez, Kato Kung Lee and Lazer Tron	Six-man "Lucha Libre rules" tag team match
3	Atlantis, Brazo de Plata and Vampiro Canadiense defeated La Fiera, Miguel Pérez Jr. and MS-1 by disqualification	Six-man "Lucha Libre rules" tag team match
4	Mano Negro (c) defeated Oro	Best two-out-of-three falls match for the NWA World Middleweight Championship
5	Dr. Wagner Jr. defeated Pierroth Jr. (c)	Best two-out-of-three falls match for the CMLL World Light Heavyweight Championship
(c) / – the champion(s) heading into the match

== 39. Aniversario de Arena México ==
39. Aniversario de Arena México
- Promotion: Consejo Mundial de Lucha Libre
- Date: April 7, 1995
- City: Mexico City, Mexico
- Venue: Arena México
- Attendance: 17,500

Event chronology
← Previous; Salvador Lutteroth Trios Tournament	Next → Torneo Gran Alternativa

Aniversario de Arena México chronology
← Previous; 38. Aniversario	Next →: 40. Aniversario

The 39. Aniversario de Arena México (Spanish for "Arena México 39th Anniversary") show was a major professional wrestling show produced by Consejo Mundial de Lucha Libre (CMLL) to commemorate the opening of Arena México, the promotion's main venue, in 1956. The event took place on April 7, 1995, as part of a special Friday Night Super Viernes series of shows.

Results

No.	Results	Stipulations
1	Astro Rey Jr. and Dr. Wagner Jr. defeated Guerrero de la Muerte and Mocho Cota	Torneo Gran Alternativa first round match
2	Atlantico and Atlantis defeated MS-1 and MS-1 Jr.	Torneo Gran Alternativa first round match
3	Bestia Salvaje and Corazon Salvaje defeated Emilio Charles Jr. and Halcón Negro Jr.	Torneo Gran Alternativa first round match
4	Shocker and Silver King defeated Chicago Express and Pierroth Jr.	Torneo Gran Alternativa first round match
5	Astro Rey Jr. and Dr. Wagner Jr. defeated Atlantico and Atlantis	Torneo Gran Alternativa semi-final match
6	Shocker and Silver King defeated Bestia Salvaje and Corazon Salvaje	Torneo Gran Alternativa semi-final match
7	Shocker and Silver King defeated Astro Rey Jr. and Dr. Wagner Jr.	Torneo Gran Alternativa final match
8	Héctor Garza defeated El Satánico	Best two-out-of-three falls Lucha de Apuestas hair vs. hair match

== 40. Aniversario de Arena México ==
40. Aniversario de Arena México
- Promotion: Consejo Mundial de Lucha Libre
- Date: April 19, 1996
- City: Mexico City, Mexico
- Venue: Arena México
- Attendance: 17,500

Event chronology
← Previous; Homenaje a Salvador Lutteroth	Next → Torneo Gran Alternativa

Aniversario de Arena México chronology
← Previous; 39. Aniversario	Next →: 41. Aniversario

The 40. Aniversario de Arena México (Spanish for "Arena México 40th Anniversary") show was a major professional wrestling show produced by Consejo Mundial de Lucha Libre (CMLL) to commemorate the opening of Arena México, the promotion's main venue, in 1956. The event took place on April 19, 1996, as part of a special Friday Night Super Viernes series of shows.

Results

No.	Results	Stipulations
1	Arkangel de la Muerte, Chicago Express and Guerrero del Futuro defeated Ringo Mendoza, El Solar and Super Astro	Six-man "Lucha Libre rules" tag team match
2	Rambo defeated Humberto Garza Jr.	Best two-out-of-three falls Lucha de Apuestas hair vs. hair match
3	Atlantis, El Hijo del Santo and Lizmark defeated Bestia Salvaje, El Satánico and El Felino	Six-man "Lucha Libre rules" tag team match
4	Rayo de Jalisco Jr., Mil Máscaras and Tinieblas defeated Dr. Wagner Jr., Canek and Emilio Charles Jr.	Six-man "Lucha Libre rules" tag team match

== 41. Aniversario de Arena México ==
41. Aniversario de Arena México
- Promotion: Consejo Mundial de Lucha Libre
- Date: April 18, 1997
- City: Mexico City, Mexico
- Venue: Arena México
- Attendance: 17,500

Event chronology
← Previous; International Gran Prix (1997)	Next → CMLL 64th Anniversary Show

Aniversario de Arena México chronology
← Previous; 40. Aniversario	Next →: 42. Aniversario

The 41. Aniversario de Arena México (Spanish for "Arena México 41st Anniversary") show was a major professional wrestling show produced by Consejo Mundial de Lucha Libre (CMLL) to commemorate the opening of Arena México, the promotion's main venue, in 1956. The event took place on April 18, 1997, as part of a special Friday Night Super Viernes series of shows.

Results

No.	Results	Stipulations
1	El Felino defeated Atlantis, Black Warrior, Brazo de Oro, Dr. Wagner Jr., El Dandy, El Hijo del Santo, El Satánico, Kevin Quinn, La Fiera, Máscara Mágica, Negro Casas, Scorpio Jr., Shocker, Silver King and Último Dragón	16-man Torneo cibernetico, elimination match
2	Steele defeated Rayo de Jalisco Jr. (c)	Best two-out-of-three falls match for the CMLL World Heavyweight Championship
(c) / – the champion(s) heading into the match

== 42. Aniversario de Arena México ==
42. Aniversario de Arena México
- Promotion: Consejo Mundial de Lucha Libre
- Date: April 24, 1998
- City: Mexico City, Mexico
- Venue: Arena México
- Attendance: 17,500

Event chronology
← Previous; Homenaje a Salvador Lutteroth	Next → Torneo Gran Alternativa

Aniversario de Arena México chronology
← Previous; 41. Aniversario	Next →: 43. Aniversario

The 42. Aniversario de Arena México (Spanish for "Arena México 42nd Anniversary") show was a major professional wrestling show produced by Consejo Mundial de Lucha Libre (CMLL) to commemorate the opening of Arena México, the promotion's main venue, in 1956. The event took place on April 24, 1998, as part of a special Friday Night Super Viernes series of shows.

Results

No.	Results	Stipulations
1	La Nueva Ola Blanca (Angel Blanco Jr., Dr. O'Borman Jr. and Hijo del Gladiador) defeated Olímpico and Los Solars (El Solar and El Solar II)	Six-man "Lucha Libre rules" tag team match
2	Los Guapos (Bestia Salvaje and Scorpio Jr.) and Guerrero de la Muerte defeated La Fiera, Tajiri and Tony Rivera	Six-man "Lucha Libre rules" tag team match
3	Atlantis, Mr. Niebla and Negro Casas defeated Black Warrior, Blue Panther and Hijo del Santo by disqualification	Six-man "Lucha Libre rules" tag team match
4	Rayo de Jalisco Jr. and The Headhunters (Headhunter A and Headhunter B) defeated Cien Caras, Dr. Wagner Jr. and Steele by disqualification	Six-man "Lucha Libre rules" tag team match
5	Gran Markus Jr. defeated Brazo de Oro	Best two-out-of-three falls Lucha de Apuestas hair vs. hair match

== 43. Aniversario de Arena México ==
43. Aniversario de Arena México
- Promotion: Consejo Mundial de Lucha Libre
- Date: April 2, 1999
- City: Mexico City, Mexico
- Venue: Arena México
- Attendance: 17,500

Event chronology
← Previous; Torneo Gran Alternativa	Next → Ruleta de la Muerte

Aniversario de Arena México chronology
← Previous; 41. Aniversario	Next →: 43. Aniversario

The 43. Aniversario de Arena México (Spanish for "Arena México 42nd Anniversary") show was a major professional wrestling show produced by Consejo Mundial de Lucha Libre (CMLL) to commemorate the opening of Arena México, the promotion's main venue, in 1956. The event took place on April 2, 1999, as part of a special Friday Night Super Viernes series of shows.

Results

No.	Results	Stipulations
1	La Flecha and Sombra de Plata defeated Fugaz and Sangre Azteca	Best two-out-of-three falls tag team match
2	Damian El Guerrero and Guerrero del Futuro defeated Mano Negra Jr. and Olimpus	Best two-out-of-three falls tag team match
3	Blue Panther and Último Guerrero defeated Fuerza Guerrera and Rey Bucanero	Torneo Gran Alternativa first round match
4	Emilio Charles Jr. and Tony Rivera defeated El Satánico and Violencia	Torneo Gran Alternativa first round match
5	Atlantico and Mr. Niebla defeated El Felino and Starman	Torneo Gran Alternativa first round match
6	Astro Rey Jr. and Shocker defeated Apolo Dantés and Karloff Lagarde Jr.	Torneo Gran Alternativa first round match
7	Blue Panther and Último Guerrero defeated Emilio Charles Jr. and Tony Rivera	Torneo Gran Alternativa semi-final match
8	Atlantico and Mr. Niebla defeated Astro Rey Jr. and Shocker	Torneo Gran Alternativa semi-final match
9	Blue Panther and Último Guerrero defeated Atlantico and Mr. Niebla	Torneo Gran Alternativa final match
10	Hijo del Santo and Negro Casas defeated Bestia Salvaje and Scorpio Jr. (c) by disqualification	Best two-out-of-three falls tag team match for the CMLL World Tag Team Championship
(c) / – the champion(s) heading into the match

== 44. Aniversario de Arena México ==
44. Aniversario de Arena México
- Promotion: Consejo Mundial de Lucha Libre
- Date: April 14, 2000
- City: Mexico City, Mexico
- Venue: Arena México
- Attendance: 17,500

Event chronology
← Previous; Juicio Final	Next → Entre Torre Infernal

Aniversario de Arena México chronology
← Previous; 43. Aniversario	Next →: 45. Aniversario

The 44. Aniversario de Arena México (Spanish for "Arena México 44th Anniversary") show was a major professional wrestling show produced by Consejo Mundial de Lucha Libre (CMLL) to commemorate the opening of Arena México, the promotion's main venue, in 1956. The event took place on April 14, 2000, as part of a special Friday Night Super Viernes series of shows.

Results

No.	Results	Stipulations
1	Espectrito and Pierrothito defeated Bracito de Oro and Tzuki	Best two-out-of-three falls tag team match
2	Antifaz del Norte, El Pantera and Tony Rivera defeated Hijo del Gladiador, Pimpinela Escarlata and Rencor Latino by disqualification	Six-man "Lucha Libre rules" tag team match
3	Máscara Año 2000 and Los Guapos (Scorpio Jr. and Shocker) defeated Lizmark, Mr. Niebla and Olímpico	Six-man "Lucha Libre rules" tag team match
4	Atlantis, Rayo de Jalisco Jr. and Negro Casas defeated Fuerza Guerrera, Pierroth Jr. and Villano III by disqualification	Six-man "Lucha Libre rules" tag team match
5	Perro Aguayo defeated Bestia Salvaje	Best two-out-of-three falls Lucha de Apuestas hair vs. hair match

== 45. Aniversario de Arena México ==
45. Aniversario de Arena México
- Promotion: Consejo Mundial de Lucha Libre
- Date: April 13, 2001
- City: Mexico City, Mexico
- Venue: Arena México
- Attendance: 17,500

Event chronology
← Previous; Juicio Final	Next → Torneo Gran Alternativa

Aniversario de Arena México chronology
← Previous; 44. Aniversario	Next →: 46. Aniversario

The 45. Aniversario de Arena México (Spanish for "Arena México 45th Anniversary") show was a major professional wrestling show produced by Consejo Mundial de Lucha Libre (CMLL) to commemorate the opening of Arena México, the promotion's main venue, in 1956. The event took place on April 13, 2001, as part of a special Friday Night Super Viernes series of shows.

Results

No.	Results	Stipulations
1	Fugaz and Sangre Azteca defeated La Flecha and Sombra de Plata	Best two-out-of-three falls tag team match
2	Pantera, Mascara Magica and Starman defeated Arkangel de la Muerte, Doctor X and Virus	Six-man "Lucha Libre rules" tag team match
3	Brazo de Oro, La Fiera and Olímpico defeated Rencor Latino, Veneno and Zumbido	Six-man "Lucha Libre rules" tag team match
4	Giganté Silva and Los Villanos (Villano III and Villano IV) defeated Apolo Dantés, Bestia Salvaje, El Signo and Scorpio Jr.	Four vs. three "Lucha Libre rules" tag team match
5	Dr. Wagner Jr., El Satánico and Negro Casas defeated Hijo del Santo, Emilio Charles Jr. and Último Guerrero by disqualification	Six-man Relevos Increibles Match

== 46. Aniversario de Arena México ==
46. Aniversario de Arena México
- Promotion: Consejo Mundial de Lucha Libre
- Date: April 12, 2002
- City: Mexico City, Mexico
- Venue: Arena México
- Attendance: 17,500

Event chronology
← Previous; International Gran Prix	Next → Copa de Arena Mexico

Aniversario de Arena México chronology
← Previous; 45. Aniversario	Next →: 47. Aniversario

The 46. Aniversario de Arena México (Spanish for "Arena México 46th Anniversary") show was a major professional wrestling show produced by Consejo Mundial de Lucha Libre (CMLL) to commemorate the opening of Arena México, the promotion's main venue, in 1956. The event took place on April 12, 2002, as part of a special Friday Night Super Viernes series of shows.

Results

No.	Results	Stipulations
1	Los Hermanos Stone (Alan Stone and Chris Stone) defeated Sangre Azteca and Valentin Mayo	Best two-out-of-three falls tag team match
2	Los Infernales (Averno and Mephisto) and Zumbido defeated Safari, Tigre Blanco and Tony Rivera	Six-man "Lucha Libre rules" tag team match
3	Los Boricuas (Nitro, Veneno and Violencia) defeated El Hombre Sin Nombre, El Felino and Olímpico	Six-man "Lucha Libre rules" tag team match
4	Los Hermanos Dinamita (Cien Caras, Máscara Año 2000 and Universo 2000) defeated Atlantis, Brazo de Plata and Rayo de Jalisco Jr.	Six-man "Lucha Libre rules" tag team match
5	Black Warrior, Negro Casas and Último Guerrero defeated Black Tiger and Tokyo Gurentai (Masada and Takemura)	Six-man "Lucha Libre rules" tag team match
6	Dr. Wagner Jr., Giganté Silva and Shocker defeated El Puma Inoue, Gigante Singh and Shibata	Six-man "Lucha Libre rules" tag team match

== 47. Aniversario de Arena México ==
47. Aniversario de Arena México
- Promotion: Consejo Mundial de Lucha Libre
- Date: April 4, 2003
- City: Mexico City, Mexico
- Venue: Arena México
- Attendance: 17,500

Event chronology
← Previous; Homenaje a Dos Leyendas	Next → International Gran Prix

Aniversario de Arena México chronology
← Previous; 46. Aniversario	Next →: 48. Aniversario

The 47. Aniversario de Arena México (Spanish for "Arena México 47th Anniversary") show was a major professional wrestling show produced by Consejo Mundial de Lucha Libre (CMLL) to commemorate the opening of Arena México, the promotion's main venue, in 1956. The event took place on April 4, 2003, as part of a special Friday Night Super Viernes series of shows.

Results

No.	Results	Stipulations
1	Bracito de Oro and Pequeño Olímpico defeated Guerrerito del Futuro and Pequeño Violencia	Best two-out-of-three falls tag team match
2	Damian El Terrible and Tony Rivera defeated Genetico and Ricky Marvin	Guapos U Tournament, Winners Advance Match
3	Damian El Terrible defeated Tony Rivera	Guapos U Tournament finals match
4	Los Infernales (Averno, El Satánico and Mephistor) defeated Olímpico, Safari and Volador Jr.	Six-man "Lucha Libre rules" tag team match
5	Brazo de Plata, Rayo de Jalisco Jr., Negro Casas and Villano III defeated Apolo Dantés, Black Warrior, Dr. Wagner Jr. and Máscara Año 2000	eight-man "Lucha Libre rules" tag team match
6	Los Guerreros del Infierno (Rey Bucanero and Último Guerrero) and Universo 2000 defeated Atlantis, Lizmark Jr. and Mr. Niebla	Six-man "Lucha Libre rules" tag team match
7	Shocker defeated Vampiro Canadiense	Best two-out-of-three falls Lucha de Apuestas hair vs. hair match

== 48. Aniversario de Arena México ==
48. Aniversario de Arena México
- Promotion: Consejo Mundial de Lucha Libre
- Date: April 30, 2004
- City: Mexico City, Mexico
- Venue: Arena México
- Attendance: 17,500

Event chronology
← Previous; Homenaje a Dos Leyendas	Next → Leyenda de Plata

Aniversario de Arena México chronology
← Previous; 47. Aniversario	Next →: 49. Aniversario

The 48. Aniversario de Arena México (Spanish for "Arena México 48th Anniversary") show was a major professional wrestling show produced by Consejo Mundial de Lucha Libre (CMLL) to commemorate the opening of Arena México, the promotion's main venue, in 1956. The event took place on April 30, 2004, as part of a special Friday Night Super Viernes series of shows.

Results

No.	Results	Stipulations
1	Shockercito and Tzuki defeated Espectrito and Fire	Best two-out-of-three falls tag team match
2	Misterioso Jr., Ricky Marvin and Volador Jr. defeated Pandilla Guerrera (Arkangel de la Muerte and Sangre Azteca) and Violencia	Six-man "Lucha Libre rules" tag team match
3	Atlantis, El Satánico and Mr. Niebla defeated Los Infernales (Averno and Mephisto) and Rey Bucanero	Six-man "Lucha Libre rules" tag team match
4	Zumbido defeated Super Crazy	Best two-out-of-three falls Lucha de Apuestas hair vs. hair match
5	Canek, L.A. Par-K and Shocker defeated Dr. Wagner Jr. and Los Guerreros del Infierno (Tarzan Boy and Último Guerrero)	Six-man "Lucha Libre rules" tag team match
6	Damian El Terrible defeated Máscara Mágica	Best two-out-of-three falls Lucha de Apuestas hair vs. hair match

== 49. Aniversario de Arena México ==
49. Aniversario de Arena México
- Promotion: Consejo Mundial de Lucha Libre
- Date: April 8, 2005
- City: Mexico City, Mexico
- Venue: Arena México
- Attendance: 17,500

Event chronology
← Previous; Homenaje a Dos Leyendas	Next → Reyes del Aire

Aniversario de Arena México chronology
← Previous; 48. Aniversario	Next →: 50. Aniversario

The 49. Aniversario de Arena México (Spanish for "Arena México 49th Anniversary") show was a major professional wrestling show produced by Consejo Mundial de Lucha Libre (CMLL) to commemorate the opening of Arena México, the promotion's main venue, in 1956. The event took place on April 8, 2005, as part of a special Friday Night Super Viernes series of shows.

Results

No.	Results	Stipulations
1	Tigre Blanco and Tigre Metálico defeated Los Hombres del Camoflaje (Artillero and Super Comando)	Best two-out-of-three falls tag team match
2	La Ola Amarilla (Okumura, Ryusuke Taguchi and Masada) defeated Alan Stone, El Satánico and Zumbido	Six-man "Lucha Libre rules" tag team match
3	Virus defeated Loco Max	Lightning Match, 1-fall, 10 minute time limit
4	El Sagrado, La Máscara, Maximo, Misterioso Jr. and Safari defeated Pandilla Guerrera (Doctor X, El Koreano, Hooligan, Nitro and Sangre Azteca)	10-man Torneo cibernetico elimination match
5	Los Guerreros del Infierno (Rey Bucanero and Último Guerrero) and Universo 2000 defeated Canek, El Canek Jr. and Perro Aguayo Jr. by disqualification	Six-man "Lucha Libre rules" tag team match
6	Los Perros del Mal (Damián 666, Halloween and Pierroth) defeated Dr. Wagner Jr., Místico and Negro Casas by disqualification	Six-man "Lucha Libre rules" tag team match

== 50. Aniversario de Arena México ==
50. Aniversario de Arena México
- Promotion: Consejo Mundial de Lucha Libre
- Date: April 28, 2006
- City: Mexico City, Mexico
- Venue: Arena México
- Attendance: 17,500

Event chronology
← Previous; La Copa Junior	Next → International Gran Prix

Aniversario de Arena México chronology
← Previous; 49. Aniversario	Next →: 51. Aniversario

The 50. Aniversario de Arena México (Spanish for "Arena México 50th Anniversary") show was a major professional wrestling show produced by Consejo Mundial de Lucha Libre (CMLL) to commemorate the opening of Arena México, the promotion's main venue, in 1956. The event took place on April 28, 2006, as part of a special Friday Night Super Viernes series of shows.

Results

No.	Results	Stipulations
1	Bam Bam, Fantasy and Tzuki defeated Fire, Pequeño Violencia and Sombrita	Six-man "Lucha Libre rules" tag team match
2	Hijo del Pierroth, Hajime Ohara and Okumura defeated El Pantera, El Texano Jr. and Metro	Six-man "Lucha Libre rules" tag team match
3	Black Warrior, Hombre Sin Nombre and Pierroth defeated El Felino, Maximo and Último Dragón	Six-man "Lucha Libre rules" tag team match
4	Dos Caras Jr., Dr. Wagner Jr. and Heavy Metal defeated Atlantis and Los Hijos del Averno (Averno and Mephisto)	Six-man "Lucha Libre rules" tag team match
5	Último Guerrero (c) defeated Héctor Garza	Best two-out-of-three falls match for the CMLL World Light Heavyweight Championship
6	Los Guerreros de la Atlantida (Rey Bucanero and Tarzan Boy) defeated Los Perros del Mal (Damián 666 and Mr. Águila)	Best two-out-of-three falls Lucha de Apuestas hair vs. hair match
(c) / – the champion(s) heading into the match

== 51. Aniversario de Arena México ==
51. Aniversario de Arena México
- Promotion: Consejo Mundial de Lucha Libre
- Date: April 13, 2007
- City: Mexico City, Mexico
- Venue: Arena México
- Attendance: 17,500

Event chronology
← Previous; Homenaje a Dos Leyendas	Next → International Gran Prix

Aniversario de Arena México chronology
← Previous; 50. Aniversario	Next →: 52. Aniversario

The 51. Aniversario de Arena México (Spanish for "Arena México 51st Anniversary") show was a major professional wrestling show produced by Consejo Mundial de Lucha Libre (CMLL) to commemorate the opening of Arena México, the promotion's main venue, in 1956. The event took place on April 13, 2007, as part of a special Friday Night Super Viernes series of shows.

Results

No.	Results	Stipulations
1	Shockercito and Tzuki defeated Fire and Mr. Aguilta	Best two-out-of-three falls tag team match
2	Hiroka, Mima Shimoda and Princesa Sujei defeated Dark Angel, Luna Mágica and Sahori	Six-man "Lucha Libre rules" tag team match
3	Dos Caras Jr., El Sagrado and Lizmark Jr. defeated Sangre Azteca, Tarzan Boy and Universo 2000	Six-man "Lucha Libre rules" tag team match
4	High Society (Marco Corleone, Rey Bucanero and Shocker) defeated Los Guerreros de la Atlantida (Atlantis, Olímpico and Último Guerrero) by disqualification	Six-man "Lucha Libre rules" tag team match
5	Místico and Negro Casas (c) defeated Los Perros del Mal (Mr. Águila and Perro Aguayo Jr.)	Best two-out-of-three falls tag team match for the CMLL World Tag Team Championship
(c) / – the champion(s) heading into the match

== 52. Aniversario de Arena México ==
52. Aniversario de Arena México
- Promotion: Consejo Mundial de Lucha Libre
- Date: April 18, 2008
- City: Mexico City, Mexico
- Venue: Arena México
- Attendance: 17,500

Event chronology
← Previous; Homenaje a Dos Leyendas	Next → Reyes del Aire

Aniversario de Arena México chronology
← Previous; 51. Aniversario	Next →: 53. Aniversario

The 52. Aniversario de Arena México (Spanish for "Arena México 52nd Anniversary") show was a major professional wrestling show produced by Consejo Mundial de Lucha Libre (CMLL) to commemorate the opening of Arena México, the promotion's main venue, in 1956. The event took place on April 18, 2008, as part of a special Friday Night Super Viernes series of shows.

Results

No.	Results	Stipulations	Times
1	Starman and Trueno defeated Los Romanos (Caligula and Messala) by disqualification	Best two-out-of-three falls tag team match	11:21
2	Diamante Negro, Euforia and Nosferatu defeated Fabián el Gitano, Maximo and Stuka Jr.	Six-man "Lucha Libre rules" tag team match	17:48
3	Los Guerros de la Atlantida (Atlantis and Toscano) and Black Warrior defeated Alex Koslov, Heavy Metal and Negro Casas	Six-man "Lucha Libre rules" tag team match	16:45
4	Blue Panther, Marco Corleone and Shocker defeated Los Perros del Mal (El Terrible and Perro Aguayo Jr.) and Villano V	Six-man "Lucha Libre rules" tag team match	08:35
5	Héctor Garza and Místico (c) vs. Los Perros del Mal (Averno and Mephisto) ended in a double disqualification	Best two-out-of-three falls tag team match for the CMLL World Tag Team Championship	—
(c) / – the champion(s) heading into the match

== 53. Aniversario de Arena México ==
53. Aniversario de Arena México
- Promotion: Consejo Mundial de Lucha Libre
- Date: April 12, 2009
- City: Mexico City, Mexico
- Venue: Arena México
- Attendance: 17,500

Event chronology
← Previous; Homenaje a Dos Leyendas	Next → Universal Championship

Aniversario de Arena México chronology
← Previous; 52. Aniversario	Next →: 54. Aniversario

The 53. Aniversario de Arena México (Spanish for "Arena México 53rd Anniversary") show was a major professional wrestling show produced by Consejo Mundial de Lucha Libre (CMLL) to commemorate the opening of Arena México, the promotion's main venue, in 1956. The event took place on April 12, 2009.

Results

No.	Results	Stipulations
1	Sombra de Plata and Trueno defeated El Cholo and El Semental	Best two-out-of-three falls tag team match
2	Los Guerreros Tuareg (Arkangel de la Muerte, Doctor X and Hooligan) defeated Leono, Metálico and Molotov	Six-man "Lucha Libre rules" tag team match
3	Hijo del Fantasma, La Mascara and Stuka Jr. defeated Poder Mexica (Sangre Azteca and Misterioso Jr.) and Okumura	Six-man "Lucha Libre rules" tag team match
4	Marcela defeated Rosa Negra	Best two-out-of-three falls Lucha de Apuestas hair vs. mask match
5	Los Guerreros de la Atlantida (Atlantis and Último Guerrero) and Lizmark Jr. defeated Dos Caras Jr., Maximo and Shocker	Six-man "Lucha Libre rules" tag team match
6	Negro Casas (c) defeated Místico (with La Mascara)	Best two-out-of-three falls match for the CMLL World Welterweight Championship
(c) / – the champion(s) heading into the match

== 54. Aniversario de Arena México ==
54. Aniversario de Arena México
- Promotion: Consejo Mundial de Lucha Libre
- Date: April 16, 2010
- City: Mexico City, Mexico
- Venue: Arena México
- Attendance: 17,500

Event chronology
← Previous; Torneo Gran Alternativa	Next → Sin Salida

Aniversario de Arena México chronology
← Previous; 53. Aniversario	Next →: 55. Aniversario

The 54. Aniversario de Arena México (Spanish for "Arena México 54th Anniversary") show was a major professional wrestling show produced by Consejo Mundial de Lucha Libre (CMLL) to commemorate the opening of Arena México, the promotion's main venue, in 1956. The event took place on April 16, 2010, as part of a special Friday Night Super Viernes series of shows.

Results

No.	Results	Stipulations	Times
1	Apocalipsis and Bronco defeated Los Rayos Tapatío (El Rayo Tapatío I and El Rayo Tapatío II)	Best two-out-of-three falls tag team match	14:55
2	Pequeño Nitro, Pequeño Black Warrior and Pierrothito defeated Bracito de Oro, Eléctrico and Shockercito	Six-man "Lucha Libre rules" tag team match	11:53
3	Blue Panther and Rey Cometa defeated Rey Bucanero and El Semental	Torneo Gran Alternativa first round match	08:15
4	Héctor Garza and Pólvora defeated La Mascara and Sensei	Torneo Gran Alternativa first round match	08:14
5	Diamante and La Sombra defeated Cancerbero and Mephisto	Torneo Gran Alternativa first round match	05:07
6	Atlantis and Inquisidor defeated El Terrible and Disturbio	Torneo Gran Alternativa first round match	04:30
7	Héctor Garza and Pólvora defeated Blue Panther and Rey Cometa	Torneo Gran Alternativa quarter final match	08:29
8	Diamante and La Sombra defeated Atlantis and Inquisidor	Torneo Gran Alternativa quarter final match	07:21
9	Héctor Garza and Pólvora defeated Diamante and La Sombra	Torneo Gran Alternativa semi-final match	10:07
10	El Felino defeated Místico	Best two-out-of-three falls match	16:31

== 55. Aniversario de Arena México ==
55. Aniversario de Arena México
- Official poster for the show
- Promotion: Consejo Mundial de Lucha Libre
- Date: April 29, 2011
- City: Mexico City, Mexico
- Venue: Arena México
- Attendance: 17,500

Event chronology
← Previous; Forjando un Ídolo	Next → Juicio Final

Aniversario de Arena México chronology
← Previous; 54. Aniversario	Next →: 56. Aniversario

The 55. Aniversario de Arena México (Spanish for "Arena México 55th Anniversary") show was a major professional wrestling show produced by Consejo Mundial de Lucha Libre (CMLL) to commemorate the opening of Arena México, the promotion's main venue, in 1956. The event took place on April 29, 2011, as part of a special Friday Night Super Viernes series of shows.

Results

No.	Results	Stipulations	Times
1	Los Guerreros Tuareg (Doctor X and Hooligan and Inquisidor) defeated Pegasso, Sensei and Starman	Six-man "Lucha Libre rules" tag team match	—
2	Misterioso Jr., Okumura and Vangelis defeated Hijo del Fantasma, Sangre Azteca and Valiente	Six-man "Lucha Libre rules" tag team match	—
3	Hijo del Signo defeated Puma King	Forjando un Ídolo Tournament Block A Match	10:35
4	Diamante defeated Hombre Bala Jr.	Forjando un Ídolo Tournament Block A Match	04:45
5	Último Guerrero (with Misterioso Jr.) (c) defeated Hirooki Goto (with Okumura)	Best two-out-of-three falls match for the CMLL World Heavyweight Championship	16:28
6	La Mascara, La Sombra and Rush defeated La Peste Negra (Mr. Niebla and Negro Casas) and Averno	Six-man "Lucha Libre rules" tag team match	—
(c) / – the champion(s) heading into the match

== 56. Aniversario de Arena México ==
56. Aniversario de Arena México
- Promotion: Consejo Mundial de Lucha Libre
- Date: April 27, 2012
- City: Mexico City, Mexico
- Venue: Arena México
- Attendance: 17,500

Event chronology
← Previous; En Busca de un Ídolo	Next → Pequeños Reyes del Aire

Aniversario de Arena México chronology
← Previous; 55. Aniversario	Next →: 57. Aniversario

The 56. Aniversario de Arena México (Spanish for "Arena México 56th Anniversary") show was a major professional wrestling show produced by Consejo Mundial de Lucha Libre (CMLL) to commemorate the opening of Arena México, the promotion's main venue, in 1956. The event took place on April 27, 2012, as part of a special Friday Night Super Viernes series of shows.

Results

No.	Results	Stipulations	Times
1	Demus 3:16 and Pierrothito defeated Astral and Electrico	Best two-out-of-three falls tag team match	—
2	Pegasso, Rey Cometa and Sangre Azteca defeated Los Guerreros Tuareg (Hooligan, Loco Max and Skándalo)	Six-man "Lucha Libre rules" tag team match	—
3	Black Warrior, La Mascara and Valiente defeated Rey Escorpión, Vangelis and Virus	Six-man "Lucha Libre rules" tag team match	—
4	Tritón defeated Puma King	En Busca de un Ídolo (2012) First Round Match	09:26
5	Pólvora defeated Dragon Lee	En Busca de un Ídolo (2012) First Round Match	—
6	La Peste Negra (El Felino, Mr. Niebla and Negro Casas) (with Zacarias) defeated Atlantis, Diamante Azul and Shocker	Six-man "Lucha Libre rules" tag team match	—
7	El Bufete del Amor (Marco Corleone, Maximo and Rush) (c) defeated La Fuerza TRT (El Terrible, Rey Bucanero and Tiger)	Best two-out-of-three falls match for the CMLL World Trios Championship	—
(c) / – the champion(s) heading into the match

== 58. Aniversario de Arena México ==
58. Aniversario de Arena México
- Official poster advertising it as a "kids day" show
- Promotion: Consejo Mundial de Lucha Libre
- Date: April 27, 2014
- City: Mexico City, Mexico
- Venue: Arena México
- Attendance: 17,500

Event chronology
← Previous; Reyes del Aire	Next → Leyenda de Azul

Aniversario de Arena México chronology
← Previous; 57. Aniversario	Next →: 59. Aniversario

The 58. Aniversario de Arena México (Spanish for "Arena México 58th Anniversary") show was a major professional wrestling show produced by Consejo Mundial de Lucha Libre (CMLL) to commemorate the opening of Arena México, the promotion's main venue, in 1956. The event took place on April 27, 2014, as part of a special Friday Night Super Viernes series of shows.

Results

No.	Results	Stipulations
1	Astral and Electrico defeated Pequeño Nitro and Pequeño Olímpico	Best two-out-of-three falls tag team match
2	Dalys la Caribeña, La Amapola and La Comandante defeated La Vaquerita, Lluvia and Marcela	Six-man "Lucha Libre rules" tag team match
3	La Peste Negra (Barbaro Cavernario, Mr. Niebla and Negro Casas) (with Zacarias) defeated Brazo de Plata, Maximo and Titán (with Ke Monito)	Six-man "Lucha Libre rules" tag team match
4	Stuka Jr. defeated Averno, Delta, Ephesto, Guerrero Maya Jr., Mephisto, Niebla Roja, Puma, Rey Cometa, Tiger, Tritón and Valiente	2014 Reyes del Air Torneo cibernetico elimination match
5	Los Revolucionarios del Terror (Dragón Rojo Jr., Pólvora and Rey Escorpión) defeated Atlantis, La Sombra and Místico	Six-man "Lucha Libre rules" tag team match

== 59. Aniversario de Arena México ==
59. Aniversario de Arena México
- Official poster for the show
- Promotion: Consejo Mundial de Lucha Libre
- Date: April 26, 2015
- City: Mexico City, Mexico
- Venue: Arena México
- Attendance: 17,500

Event chronology
← Previous; Homenaje a Dos Leyendas	Next → Reyes del Aire

Aniversario de Arena México chronology
← Previous; 57. Aniversario	Next →: 60. Aniversario

The 59. Aniversario de Arena México (Spanish for "Arena México 59th Anniversary") show was a major professional wrestling show produced by Consejo Mundial de Lucha Libre (CMLL) to commemorate the opening of Arena México, the promotion's main venue, in 1956. The event took place on April 26, 2015, and featured six matches in total. As part of the show the team known as Los Reyes de la Atlantida ("The Kings of Atlantis"; Atlantis, Delta and Guerrero Maya Jr.) defeated the reigning Mexican National Trios Champions La Peste Negra ("The Black Plague"; Negro Casas, El Felino and Mr. Niebla) to win the championship for the third time, becoming the 38th overall champions.

Results

No.	Results	Stipulations
1	Molotov and Sensei defeated Apocalipsis and El Cholo	Best two-out-of-three falls tag team match
2	Acero, Fantasy and Shockercito defeated Mercurio, Pequeño Universo 2000 and Pequeño Violencia	Six-man "Lucha Libre rules" tag team match
3	Nitro, Okumura and Virus defeated Pegasso, Stigma and Stuka Jr.	Six-man "Lucha Libre rules" tag team match
4	Los Reyes de la Atlantida (Atlantis, Delta and Guerrero Maya Jr.) defeated La Peste Negra (Negro Casas, El Felino and Mr. Niebla) (c)	Six-man "Lucha Libre rules" tag team match for the Mexican National Trios Championship
5	Marco Corleone defeated La Sombra, Pólvora, Barbaro Cavernario, Dragon Lee, Kamaitachi, La Máscara, Ripper, Morphosis and Titán	10-man Torneo cibernetico elimination match
(c) / – the champion(s) heading into the match

== 61. Aniversario de Arena México ==
61. Aniversario de Arena México
- Promotion: Consejo Mundial de Lucha Libre
- Date: April 28, 2017
- City: Mexico City, Mexico
- Venue: Arena México
- Attendance: 17,500

Event chronology
← Previous; La Copa Junior	Next → Torneo Gran Alternativa

Aniversario de Arena México chronology
← Previous; 60. Aniversario	Next →: 62. Aniversario

The 61. Aniversario de Arena México (Spanish for "Arena México 61st Anniversary") show was a major professional wrestling show produced by Consejo Mundial de Lucha Libre (CMLL) to commemorate the opening of Arena México, the promotion's main venue, in 1956. The event took place on April 28, 2017, and featured six matches in total. The main event was a best two-out-of-three falls Singles match where La Máscara defeated Volador Jr., after which wrestlers and officials paid homage to La Máscara's father, Brazo de Oro, who died earlier in the day. The other feature match on the show was the finals of the 2017 La Copa Junior tournament, where Soberano Jr. (son of Euforia) defeated Sansón (son of Cien Caras) to win the tournament. The show included four additional mathes

Results

No.	Results	Stipulations
1	Eléctrico and Fantasy defeated Pequeño Nitro and Pequeño Olímpico	Best two-out-of-three falls tag team match
2	Estrellita, La Metálica and Sanely defeated Dalys la Caribeña, Marcela and Zeuxis	Six-man "Lucha Libre rules" tag team match
3	Soberano Jr. defeated Sansón	La Copa Junior
4	Diamante Azul, Marco Corleone and Valiente defeated Hechicero, Kráneo and Ripper	Six-man "Lucha Libre rules" tag team match
5	Carístico, Dragon Lee and Místico defeated La Peste Negra (Bárbaro Cavernario and Negro Casas) and Mephisto	Six-man "Lucha Libre rules" tag team match
6	La Máscara defeated Volador Jr.	Best two-out-of-three falls Singles match

== 62. Aniversario de Arena México ==
62. Aniversario de Arena México
- Official poster for the event
- Promotion: Consejo Mundial de Lucha Libre
- Date: April 27, 2018
- City: Mexico City, Mexico
- Venue: Arena México
- Attendance: 17,500

Event chronology
← Previous; 75. Aniversario de Arena Coliseo	Next → Torneo Gran Alternativa

Aniversario de Arena México chronology
← Previous; 61. Aniversario	Next →: 63. Aniversario

The 62. Aniversario de Arena México (Spanish for "Arena México 62nd Anniversary") show was a major professional wrestling show produced by Consejo Mundial de Lucha Libre (CMLL) to commemorate the opening of Arena México, the promotion's main venue, in 1956. The event took place on April 27, 2018, and featured six matches in total, including a Lucha de Apuestas, or bet match, where both female competitors put their hair on the line in the match. In the end Princesa Sugehit won and La Seductora was forced to have all her hair shaved off.

Results

No.	Results	Stipulations	Times
1	Drone, Audaz and Tritón defeated Okumura, Tiger and Virus	Six-man "Lucha Libre rules" tag team match	12:30
2	Soberano Jr., Stuka Jr. and Titán defeated La Nueva Generación Dinamita (El Cuatrero, Forastero and Sansón)	Six-man "Lucha Libre rules" tag team match	13:59
3	Princesa Sugehit defeated La Seductora	Best two-out-of-three falls Lucha de Apuestas, hair vs. hair, match	17:55
4	Hechicero and TGR (Rey Bucanero and El Terrible) defeated Ángel de Oro, Diamante Azul and Niebla Roja	Six-man "Lucha Libre rules" tag team match	14:35
5	Kraneo defeated Rush	Singles match	09:10
6	Atlantis, Místico and Volador Jr. defeated La Peste Negra (Bárbaro Cavernario and Negro Casas) and Último Guerrero	Six-man "Lucha Libre rules" tag team match	07:25

== 63. Aniversario de Arena México ==
63. Aniversario de Arena México
- Official poster for the show
- Promotion: Consejo Mundial de Lucha Libre
- Date: April 26, 2019
- City: Mexico City, Mexico
- Venue: Arena México
- Attendance: 17,500

Event chronology
← Previous; Torneo Nacional de Parejas Increíbles	Next → Juicio Final

Aniversario de Arena México chronology
← Previous; 62. Aniversario	Next →: 64. Aniversario

The 63. Aniversario de Arena México (Spanish for "Arena México 63rd Anniversary") show was a major professional wrestling show produced by Consejo Mundial de Lucha Libre (CMLL) to commemorate the opening of Arena México, the promotion's main venue, in 1956. The event took place on April 26, 2019, and featured six matches in total.

Results

No.	Results	Stipulations
1	El Coyote and Grako defeated Sonic and Super Astro Jr.	Best two-out-of-three falls team match
2	Kaho Kobayashi, Marcela, and Tae Honma defeated La Amapola, La Comandante, and La Seductora	Best two-out-of-three falls six-man tag team match
3	Atlantis, Atlantis Jr., and Tritón defeated Los Hijos del Infierno (Ephesto, Luciferno, and Mephisto)	Best two-out-of-three falls six-man tag team match
4	Valiente defeated Hechicero	Lighting Match (One fall, 10-minute time limit)
5	La Sangre Dinamita (El Cuatrero and Forastero) and Máscara Año 2000 defeated Ángel de Oro, Soberano Jr., and Niebla Roja	Best two-out-of-three falls six-man tag team match
6	Bárbaro Cavernario and Titán defeated Último Guerrero and Volador Jr.	Torneo Nacional de Parejas Increíbles 2019 final match

=== 64. Aniversario de Arena México ===
Due to the COVID-19 pandemic, CMLL cancelled all their shows after March 13, 2020, including all shows in April or May. It has not been announced if CMLL would hold a 64th Anniversary Show once they resume normal operations.

== 65. Aniversario de Arena México ==
65. Aniversario de Arena México
- Promotion: Consejo Mundial de Lucha Libre
- Date: April 24, 2021
- City: Mexico City, Mexico
- Venue: Arena México
- Attendance: 17,500

Aniversario de Arena México chronology
← Previous; 63. Aniversario	Next →: 66. Aniversario

The 65. Aniversario de Arena México (Spanish for "Arena México 65th Anniversary") show was a major professional wrestling show produced by Consejo Mundial de Lucha Libre (CMLL) to commemorate the opening of Arena México, the promotion's main venue, in 1956. The event took place on April 24, 2021, and featured five matches in total.

Results

No.	Results	Stipulations
1	Chamuel and El Gallito defeated Microman and Zacarías el Perico	Tag team match
2	Dalys la Caribeña and La Jarochita defeated Marcela and La Amapola	Tag team match
3	Los Cancerberos del Infierno (Virus, Raziel and Cancerbero) defeated Stuka Jr., Guerrero Maya Jr. and Star Jr.	Six-man tag team match for the vacant CMLL World Trios Championship
4	Alianza de Plata y Oro (Carístico and Místico (c) defeated Ángel de Oro and El Terrible	Tag team match for the CMLL World Tag Team Championship
5	Atlantis, Volador Jr. and Euforia defeated Bárbaro Cavernario, Gran Guerrero and Último Guerrero	Best two-out-of-three falls team match
(c) / – the champion(s) heading into the match
