= L'Ange Blanc =

Personal information
- Born: Francisco Pino Farina; 1930s Spain
- Died: January 2006
- Children: Ricardo Torres (son)

Professional wrestling career
- Ring name(s): L'Ange Blanc; El Angel Blanco; The White Angel; Pancho Pino; El Ángel Exterminador
- Billed height: 170 cm (5 ft 7 in)
- Billed weight: 75 kg (165 lb)
- Debut: 1950s
- Retired: 1960s

L'Ange Blanc (French for "The White Angel") (1930s – January 2006) is the most well known ring name of Francisco Pino Farina a retired Spanish-born professional wrestler. Originally he worked in France as the masked L'Ange Blanc and would later work under the names "El Angel Blanco" and "the White Angel" after being unmasked. He worked in the United States as Pancho Pino and as El Ángel Exterminador in Mexico.

== Professional wrestling career ==
Farina began his wrestling career in the 1950s working primarily in France as the high flying masked face (wrestling term for those that portray the good guys) L'Ange Blanc (The White Angel). His pristine white mask, trunks and boots became his trademark as he was one of the early icons of professional wrestling, with his popularity rivaling that of Hulk Hogan in the United States or Santo in Mexico. He was considered a bigger star in his home country than André the Giant (who was known in France as Le Géant Ferré). L'Ange Blanc was enigmatic and one of the first aerial wrestlers in the heyday of French wrestling. He had televised fights against such wrestling stars as Le Bourreau de Béthune (Jacques Ducrez, another famous masked wrestler), Roger Delaporte and Robert Duranton. Most of his televised matches were commentated by the famous French journalist Roger Couderc which helped the promotion of his wrestling role. In his matches, L'Ange Blanc was the "avenger", while his opponents were the bad guys. By 1962, ratings started to drop so promoters decided to unmask "L'Ange Blanc", which ultimately killed the gimmick.

Following his unmasking he started to work in the United States under the name Pancho Pino. In 1967 he began working in Mexico as a masked wrestler, but there was already a well known wrestler working as Ángel Blanco so instead he began working as El Ángel Exterminador ("The Destroying Angel") working primarily for Empresa Mexicana de Lucha Libre (EMLL). In the fall of 1967 he worked a storyline against Ángel Blanco, and as part of that storyline he defeated Black Shadow in a Lucha de Apuestas, or bet match, forcing Shadow to have his hair shaved off after the match. That match was a preview of the main event of the EMLL 34th Anniversary Show where both Angels bet their masks on the outcome of the match. In the end the Mexican Ángel Blanco defeated Ángel Exterminador and forced him to unmask afterwards as per lucha libre (a wrestling style originary from Mexico) traditions. In the years following the unmasking Pino retired from professional wrestling.

== Legacy ==
Other wrestlers continued to emulate Pino's masked persona, each pretending to be the "real" L'Ange Blanc, most notably Charles Eltes and Gilbert Péchard. In early 1960s Britain, Judo Al Hayes, himself a regular on French TV Wrestling, appeared as the White Angel for opposition promoter Paul Lincoln, feuding with masked heel Dr. Death played by Lincoln himself. Another masked Spanish wrestler Angelito debuted on French TV in 1971 (against Jacky Richard) but unmasked halfway through his debut match. He nonetheless remained a staple of French wrestling into the early 1990s, appearing on season 2 of New Catch on Eurosport in 1991 (again facing Richard, by now billed as the "Travesti Man".)

== Luchas de Apuestas record ==
Winner (wager)	Loser (wager)	Location	Event	Date	Notes
Black Mask (mask)	L'Ange Blanc (mask)	Leeds, England	Live event	1962	
El Ángel Exterminador (mask)	Black Shadow (hair)	Mexico City, Mexico	EMLL live event	August 25, 1967	
Ángel Blanco (mask)	El Ángel Exterminador (mask)	Mexico City, Mexico	EMLL 34th Anniversary Show	August 29, 1967	
