= EMLL 34th Anniversary Show =

Mexican Professional wrestling show

- Promotion: Empresa Mexicana de Lucha Libre
- Date: September 29, 1967
- City: Mexico City, Mexico
- Venue: Arena México

Event chronology
← Previous; EMLL 33rd Anniversary Show (2)	Next →: 12. Aniversario de Arena México

EMLL Anniversary Show chronology
← Previous; 33rd Anniversary (2)	Next → 35th Anniversary

The EMLL 34th Anniversary Show (Spanish: 34. Aniversario de EMLL) was a professional wrestling major show event produced by Empresa Mexicana de Lucha Libre (EMLL) that took place on September 29, 1967, in Arena México, Mexico City, Mexico. The event commemorated the 34th anniversary of EMLL, which would become the oldest professional wrestling promotion in the world. The Anniversary show is EMLL's biggest show of the year, their Super Bowl event. The EMLL Anniversary Show series is the longest-running annual professional wrestling show, starting in 1934.

== Production ==
=== Background ===
The 1967 Anniversary show commemorated the 34th anniversary of the Mexican professional wrestling company Empresa Mexicana de Lucha Libre (Spanish for "Mexican Wrestling Promotion"; EMLL) holding their first show on September 22, 1933 by promoter and founder Salvador Lutteroth. EMLL was rebranded early in 1992 to become Consejo Mundial de Lucha Libre ("World Wrestling Council"; CMLL) signal their departure from the National Wrestling Alliance. With the sales of the Jim Crockett Promotions to Ted Turner in 1988 EMLL became the oldest, still-operating wrestling promotion in the world. Over the years EMLL/CMLL has on occasion held multiple shows to celebrate their anniversary but since 1977 the company has only held one annual show, which is considered the biggest show of the year, CMLL's equivalent of WWE's WrestleMania or their Super Bowl event. CMLL has held their Anniversary show at Arena México in Mexico City, Mexico since 1956, the year the building was completed, over time Arena México earned the nickname "The Cathedral of Lucha Libre" due to it hosting most of EMLL/CMLL's major events since the building was completed. Traditionally EMLL/CMLL holds their major events on Friday Nights, replacing their regularly scheduled Super Viernes show.

=== Storylines ===
The event featured an undetermined number of professional wrestling matches with different wrestlers involved in pre-existing scripted feuds, plots and storylines. Wrestlers were portrayed as either heels (referred to as rudos in Mexico, those that portray the "bad guys") or faces (técnicos in Mexico, the "good guy" characters) as they followed a series of tension-building events, which culminated in a wrestling match or series of matches. Due to the nature of keeping mainly paper records of wrestling at the time no documentation has been found for some of the matches of the show.

== Event ==
The 34th EMLL anniversary show featured an unknown number of matches, traditionally EMLL has five to six matches per show, but at times have had more or less and the total number has not been verified. Only the headline match, the main event, has been verified for the show; the ultimate match in Lucha Libre a Lucha de Apuesta mask vs. mask match between Ángel Blanco ("White Angel") and Ángel Exterminador ("Destroying Angel"). In the end Ángel Blanco defeated his opponent, forcing him to unmask and reveal that he was Spanish born Pancho Pino, better known as L'Ange Blanc, which is French for "White Angel".

== Results ==
No.	Results	Stipulations
1	Ángel Blanco defeated Ángel Exterminador	Best two-out-of-three falls Lucha de Apuesta mask vs. mask match
