= EMLL 37th Anniversary Show =

Mexican Professional wrestling show

- Promotion: Empresa Mexicana de Lucha Libre
- Date: September, 1970
- City: Mexico City, Mexico
- Venue: Arena México
- Attendance: Unknown

Event chronology
| ← Previous; 14. Aniversario de Arena México | Next → EMLL 38th Anniversary Show |

EMLL Anniversary Show chronology
| ← Previous; 36th Anniversary | Next → 38th Anniversary |

The EMLL 37th Anniversary Show (Spanish: 37. Aniversario de EMLL) was a professional wrestling major show event produced by Empresa Mexicana de Lucha Libre (EMLL) that took place in September 1970 in Arena México, Mexico City, Mexico. The event commemorated the 37th anniversary of EMLL, which would become the oldest professional wrestling promotion in the world. The Anniversary show is EMLL's biggest show of the year, their Super Bowl event. The EMLL Anniversary Show series is the longest-running annual professional wrestling show, starting in 1934.

== Production ==
=== Background ===
The 1970 Anniversary show commemorated the 37th anniversary of the Mexican professional wrestling company Empresa Mexicana de Lucha Libre (Spanish for "Mexican Wrestling Promotion"; EMLL) holding their first show on September 22, 1933 by promoter and founder Salvador Lutteroth. EMLL was rebranded early in 1992 to become Consejo Mundial de Lucha Libre ("World Wrestling Council"; CMLL) signal their departure from the National Wrestling Alliance. With the sales of the Jim Crockett Promotions to Ted Turner in 1988 EMLL became the oldest, still-operating wrestling promotion in the world. Over the years EMLL/CMLL has on occasion held multiple shows to celebrate their anniversary but since 1977 the company has only held one annual show, which is considered the biggest show of the year, CMLL's equivalent of WWE's WrestleMania or their Super Bowl event. CMLL has held their Anniversary show at Arena México in Mexico City, Mexico since 1956, the year the building was completed, over time Arena México earned the nickname "The Cathedral of Lucha Libre" due to it hosting most of EMLL/CMLL's major events since the building was completed. Traditionally EMLL/CMLL holds their major events on Friday Nights, replacing their regularly scheduled Super Viernes show.

=== Storylines ===
The event featured an undetermined number of professional wrestling matches with different wrestlers involved in pre-existing scripted feuds, plots and storylines. Wrestlers were portrayed as either heels (referred to as rudos in Mexico, those that portray the "bad guys") or faces (técnicos in Mexico, the "good guy" characters) as they followed a series of tension-building events, which culminated in a wrestling match or series of matches. Due to the nature of keeping mainly paper records of wrestling at the time no documentation has been found for some of the matches of the show.

== Event ==
The 37th EMLL anniversary show featured an unknown number of matches, traditionally EMLL has five to six matches per show, but at times have had more or less and the total number has not been verified. In the first of two confirmed matches Masio Koma, holder of the NWA World Middleweight Championship, defended his title against Aníbal, defeating him in what was described as a "controversial ending" when he resorted to breaking the rules. In the main event Raul Mata and Shibata faced off in a Lucha de Apuesta ("Bet match"), with both men risking their hair on the outcome of the match. The Mexican native Mata defeated the Japanese Rudo, forcing him to be shaved bald and sending the crowd home happy with the outcome.

== Aftermath ==
Masio Koma continued to resort to various underhanded rudo tactics to retain the title until Aníbal dethroned him in December 1970.

== Results ==
| No. | Results | Stipulations |
|---|---|---|
| 1 | Masio Koma (c) defeated Aníbal | Best two-out-of-three falls match for the NWA World Middleweight Championship |
| 2 | Raul Mata defeated Shibata | Best two-out-of-three falls Lucha de Apuesta hair vs. hair match |
(c) / – the champion(s) heading into the match
