= EMLL 36th Anniversary Show =

Mexican Professional wrestling show

- Promotion: Empresa Mexicana de Lucha Libre
- Date: August 15, 1969; September 19
- City: Mexico City, Mexico
- Venue: Arena México
- Attendance: 17,100 (August 15)

Event chronology
← Previous; 13. Aniversario de Arena México	Next →: 14. Aniversario de Arena México

EMLL Anniversary Show chronology
← Previous; 35th Anniversary	Next → 37th Anniversary

The EMLL 36th Anniversary Show (Spanish: 36. Aniversario de EMLL)' was a professional wrestling major show event produced by Empresa Mexicana de Lucha Libre (EMLL) that took place on August 15, 1969 in Arena México, Mexico City, Mexico. It commemorated the 36th anniversary of EMLL, which would become the oldest professional wrestling promotion in the world. It is EMLL's biggest show of the year, and the longest-running annual professional wrestling show, having started in 1934.

Records indicate two different EMLL shows held to commemorate the 36th anniversary: one on August 15 and one on September 19. Records at the time did not indicate that the August 15 show was the anniversary show, while later released information on the anniversary shows lists August 15 as the date. contemporary records, and some current records, indicate that the September 19 Super Viernes show in Arena México was the anniversary show. The first anniversary show saw El Solitario defeat Rayo de Jalisco to win the NWA World Middleweight Championship, while Ray Mendoza successfully defended the NWA World Light Heavyweight Championship against Dr. Wagner. The September 19 main event had El Solitario make a successful title defense against El Santo.

== Production ==
=== Background ===
The 1969 Anniversary show commemorated the 36th anniversary of the Mexican professional wrestling company Empresa Mexicana de Lucha Libre (Spanish for "Mexican Wrestling Promotion"; EMLL) holding their first show on September 22, 1933 by promoter and founder Salvador Lutteroth. EMLL was rebranded early in 1992 to become Consejo Mundial de Lucha Libre ("World Wrestling Council"; CMLL) signal their departure from the National Wrestling Alliance. With the sales of the Jim Crockett Promotions to Ted Turner in 1988 EMLL became the oldest, still-operating wrestling promotion in the world. Over the years EMLL/CMLL has on occasion held multiple shows to celebrate their anniversary but since 1977 the company has only held one annual show, which is considered the biggest show of the year, CMLL's equivalent of WWE's WrestleMania or their Super Bowl event. CMLL has held their Anniversary show at Arena México in Mexico City, Mexico since 1956, the year the building was completed, over time Arena México earned the nickname "The Cathedral of Lucha Libre" due to it hosting most of EMLL/CMLL's major events since the building was completed. Traditionally EMLL/CMLL holds their major events on Friday Nights, replacing their regularly scheduled Super Viernes show.

=== Storylines ===
The events featured an undetermined number of professional wrestling matches with different wrestlers involved in pre-existing scripted feuds, plots and storylines. Wrestlers were portrayed as either heels (referred to as rudos in Mexico, those that portray the "bad guys") or faces (técnicos in Mexico, the "good guy" characters) as they followed a series of tension-building events, which culminated in a wrestling match or series of matches. Due to the nature of keeping mainly paper records of wrestling at the time no documentation has been found for some of the matches of the show.

Rayo de Jalisco defeated René Guajardo on April 18, 1969, to win the NWA World Middleweight Championship, his third reign with the championship. In 1968, El Solitario joined forces with Ángel Blanco and Dr. Wagner to form a rudo trio known as La Ola Blanca ("The White Wave"). By 1969 the group was the biggest Rudó team in all of Mexico, but El Solitario started to gain a following among the fans, often hearing cheers during his matches. El Solitario's popularity increased when Dr. Wagner and Ángel Blanco turned on him one night during a match and attacked him, turning El Solitario tecnico. As part of his tecnico turn, El Solitario began to pursue the NWA World Middleweight Championship held by Rayo de Jalisco, having 2 unsuccessful challenges prior to the anniversary show.

Ray Mendoza's NWA World Light Heavyweight Championship reign began on December 25, 1968, when he defeated Ángel Blanco to become champion. By August 1969, Ángel Blanco's tag team partner Dr. Wagner had been lined up as Mendoza's next rival, with a championship match between the two set up.

== Event ==
The 36th EMLL anniversary shows featured an unknown number of matches, traditionally EMLL has five to six matches per show, but at times have had more or less and the total number has not been verified. The only match verified for the show saw El Solitario, the most popular wrestler at the time, face off against Rayo de Jalisco in a best two-out-of three falls match for Rayo's NWA World Middleweight Championship. El Soltario took the second and third fall of the match and with that also the NWA World Middleweight Championship.

== Aftermath ==
El Solitario reigned as the NWA World Middleweight Champion until June 28, 1970, when he lost the title to Mashio Koma. Ray Mendoza's run as the NWA World Light Heavyweight Championship ended on December 19, 1969, as Colosi Colosetti defeated Mendoza to claim the championship.

== Anniversary results August 15 ==
No.	Results	Stipulations
1	Ray Mendoza (c) defeated Dr. Wagner	Best two-out-of-three falls match for the NWA World Light Heavyweight Championship
2	El Solitario defeated Rayo de Jalisco (c)	Best two-out-of-three falls match for the NWA World Middleweight Championship
(c) / – the champion(s) heading into the match

== Anniversary results September 19 ==
No.	Results	Stipulations
1	El Solitario (c) defeated Rayo de Jalisco	Best two-out-of-three falls match for the NWA World Middleweight Championship
(c) / – the champion(s) heading into the match
