= Estrella Blanca =

Mexican professional wrestler (1938–2021)

Personal information
- Born: January 15, 1938 Angangueo, Michoacán, Mexico
- Died: November 15, 2021 (aged 83)

Professional wrestling career
- Ring name: Estrella Blanca
- Billed height: 1.63 m (5 ft 4 in)
- Billed weight: 65 kg (143 lb)
- Trained by: "Sardo" Flores; Masando Mazada
- Debut: 1954; Mexico City. Mexico
- Retired: 2011

Estrella Blanca (real name unknown; January 15, 1938 – November 15, 2021) was a Mexican professional wrestler. Estrella Blanca was most known for his claim to have won more Luchas de Apuestas "bet matches" than anyone, winning more masks and hair than any other wrestler. Blanca claimed to have been in 700 Luchas de Apuestas since making his wrestling debut in 1954. "Estrella Blanca" is Spanish for "White Star".

== Professional wrestling career ==
Estrella Blanca made his professional wrestling debut in 1954, starting out as "Estrella Blanca", an masked wrestler, who wore a blue mask with white edge trim around the eye, nose, and mouth opening and a white star on the forehead. Initially, Estrella Blanca only wore the mask during matches and not backstage like most Luchadors do, it was not until he met El Santo backstage at a wrestling event that he learned the importance of always wearing the mask when in public, Santo taught him that it was a part of the "wrestling illusion" and that it allowed Estrella Blanca privacy when he needed it. By the early 1960s Estrella Blanca had already won several Luchas de Apuestas matches, a Lucha Libre match where the competitors "bet" their mask or hair. On August 20, 1968, Estrella Blanca defeated Raul Guerrero to win the Mexican National Lightweight Championship. Over the next year Estrella Blanca defended the title on a couple of occasions, warding off the challenge of former champion Raul Guerrero. On September 20, 1969, Estrella Blanca lost the Mexican National Lightweight Championship to Rodolfo Ruiz. Blanca would make several unsuccessful bids for the Lightweight title over the next couple of years until he finally unseated Rodolfo Ruiz on August 11, 1971. Over the next year and a half Blanca only made a limited number of defenses, including one against "Taro" in 1972. On April 11, 1993 Taro ended Estrella Blanca's second and final run with the Lightweight title. In subsequent years Estrella Blanca focused more on winning Apuestas matches, winning numerous masks and hairs throughout the decade. At some point in either the late 1970s or early 1980s, Estrella Blanca began defending the AWA World Lightweight Championship, records are unclear on the lineage of the title although it is unlikely that it was sanctioned by the Minnesota-based American Wrestling Association. In later interviews, Blanca would claim that he successfully defended the title over 50 times.

By the early 1980s Estrella Blanca's Apuestas record had grown to over 200 confirmed wins and by the end of his career Blanca claimed to have won nearly 700 Apuestas matches, with just over 200 wins having been documented. The just over 200 Apuestas wins is the most wins for any professional wrestler. Luchador Super Muñeco claims to hold the record for the most Apuestas wins, but with just over 100 confirmed wins he is a close second. Blanca has stated that his most memorable Luchas de Apuestas match was a 1977 match where he teamed with Ultraman to defeat the team of Zeus and Pantera Azul. In the late 1980s Estrella Blanca's career slowed down significantly, before finally retiring. In the final years of his career Estrella Blanca was offered half a million pesos (this was before the Pesos crashed in the mid-1990s) by World Wrestling Association promoter Benjamin Mora if he would lose his mask in a match, but Estrella Blanca turned him down, opting to retire without losing his mask. Since his retirement in the early 1990s Estrella Blanca has made a couple of "special appearances", mainly teaming with "Estrella Blanca, Jr.", who is his son as well as "Estrella Blanca II" or "Estrella Blanca III"; Neither of whom are actually related to Estrella Blanca but has his permission to use the name and mask. During CMLL's 75th Anniversary celebration in 2008 Estrella Blanca was invited to make an appearance during a show in Mexico City and was one of the legends honored during the show along with Leon Negro, Tony Lopez, Saeta Azteca, and Manuel Robles.

== Personal life ==
Estrella Blanca was married to Teresa Flores Bocanegra, the daughter of his wrestling trainer "Sardo" Flores. The two were married in 1958 and together had a son who wrestles as "Estrella Blanca, Jr." Early on in their marriage, Blanca promised his wife to never be unmasked to ensure that the couple could move in public without attracting any unwarranted attention. Blanca stated that the promise to never unmask was stronger than any monetary reward ever offered by a promoter. He also stated that he wanted to be buried with his mask on.

== Championships and accomplishments ==
- AWA (Note: This championship is not sanctioned by the American Wrestling Association, records on what AWA stands for in this case are unclear on the subject.)
  - AWA World Lightweight Championship (1 time)
- Empresa Mexicana de Lucha Libre
  - Mexican National Lightweight Championship (2 times)
- Mexican local promotions
  - Veracruz Welterweight Championship (1 time)

== Luchas de Apuestas record ==
Winner (wager)	Loser (wager)	Location	Event	Date	Notes
Estrella Blanca (mask)	Adán Ruiz	N/A	Live event	N/A	
Estrella Blanca (mask)	Águila Azul (mask)	N/A	Live event	N/A	
Estrella Blanca (mask)	Águila Infernal (mask)	N/A	Live event	N/A	
Estrella Blanca (mask)	Águila Negra (mask)	N/A	Live event	N/A	
Estrella Blanca (mask)	Amenaza Roja (mask)	N/A	Live event	N/A	
Estrella Blanca (mask)	Ángel De Oro (mask)	N/A	Live event	N/A	
Estrella Blanca (mask)	Ángel del Ring (mask)	N/A	Live event	N/A	
Estrella Blanca (mask)	Ángel Sagrado (mask)	N/A	Live event	N/A	
Estrella Blanca (mask)	Araña Negra (mask)	N/A	Live event	N/A	
Estrella Blanca (mask)	Arco iris (mask)	N/A	Live event	N/A	
Estrella Blanca (mask)	Arquero Negro (hair)	N/A	Live event	N/A	
Estrella Blanca (mask)	As Negro (hair)	N/A	Live event	N/A	
Estrella Blanca (mask)	Átomo Azul (mask)	N/A	Live event	N/A	
Estrella Blanca (mask)	Batman (mask)	N/A	Live event	N/A	
Estrella Blanca (mask)	Batman (hair)	N/A	Live event	N/A	
Estrella Blanca (mask)	Beisbolista (mask)	N/A	Live event	N/A	
Estrella Blanca (mask)	Bombero de Satán (mask)	N/A	Live event	N/A	
Estrella Blanca (mask)	Bombero Infernal (hair)	N/A	Live event	N/A	
Estrella Blanca (mask)	Buitre I (mask)	N/A	Live event	N/A	
Estrella Blanca (mask)	Buitre II (mask)	N/A	Live event	N/A	
Estrella Blanca (mask)	Buitre Rojo (mask)	N/A	Live event	N/A	
Estrella Blanca (mask)	Buitre Rojo (mask)	N/A	Live event	N/A	
Estrella Blanca (mask)	Caballero (mask)	N/A	Live event	N/A	
Estrella Blanca (mask)	Caballero Jr (mask)	N/A	Live event	N/A	
Estrella Blanca (mask)	Caballero Negro (mask)	N/A	Live event	N/A	
Estrella Blanca (mask)	Cachorro Negro (hair)	N/A	Live event	N/A	
Estrella Blanca (mask)	Cadáver (hair)	N/A	Live event	N/A	
Estrella Blanca (mask)	Calavera(mask)	N/A	Live event	N/A	
Estrella Blanca (mask)	Cardenal (mask)	N/A	Live event	N/A	
Estrella Blanca (mask)	Centella Roja (mask)	N/A	Live event	N/A	
Estrella Blanca (mask)	Chamaco Veloz (hair)	N/A	Live event	N/A	
Estrella Blanca (mask)	Chucho El Bello (mask)	N/A	Live event	N/A	
Estrella Blanca (mask)	Ciclón (mask)	N/A	Live event	N/A	
Estrella Blanca (mask)	Ciclón De Oriente (hair)	N/A	Live event	N/A	
Estrella Blanca (mask)	Ciclón Negro (mask)	N/A	Live event	N/A	
Estrella Blanca (mask)	Cobra (mask)	N/A	Live event	N/A	
Estrella Blanca (mask)	Cobra Negra (mask)	N/A	Live event	N/A	
Estrella Blanca (mask)	Coloso Del Ring (mask)	N/A	Live event	N/A	
Estrella Blanca (mask)	Comandante Cero (hair)	N/A	Live event	N/A	
Estrella Blanca (mask)	Comandante Cero I (mask)	N/A	Live event	N/A	
Estrella Blanca (mask)	Comandante Cero II (mask)	N/A	Live event	N/A	
Estrella Blanca (mask)	Cometa (mask)	N/A	Live event	N/A	
Estrella Blanca (mask)	Cometa Halley (mask)	N/A	Live event	N/A	
Estrella Blanca (mask)	Conde Azul (mask)	N/A	Live event	N/A	
Estrella Blanca (mask)	Conde Azul (mask)	N/A	Live event	N/A	
Estrella Blanca (mask)	Conde Drácula (mask)	N/A	Live event	N/A	
Estrella Blanca (mask)	Danny Salinas (mask)	N/A	Live event	N/A	
Estrella Blanca (mask)	Demonio Rojo (mask)	N/A	Live event	N/A	
Estrella Blanca (mask)	Depredador (mask)	N/A	Live event	N/A	
Estrella Blanca (mask)	Desalmado (mask)	N/A	Live event	N/A	
Estrella Blanca (mask)	Diabólico I (mask)	N/A	Live event	N/A	
Estrella Blanca (mask)	Diabólico II (mask)	N/A	Live event	N/A	
Estrella Blanca (mask)	Dr. Jungla (mask)	N/A	Live event	N/A	
Estrella Blanca (mask)	Dr. Landru (mask)	N/A	Live event	N/A	
Estrella Blanca (mask)	Dragón Infernal (mask)	N/A	Live event	N/A	
Estrella Blanca (mask)	El Acuático (hair)	N/A	Live event	N/A	
Estrella Blanca (mask)	El Alfil (hair)	N/A	Live event	N/A	
Estrella Blanca (mask)	El Apache (hair)	N/A	Live event	N/A	
Estrella Blanca (mask)	El Barón Negro (hair)	N/A	Live event	N/A	
Estrella Blanca (mask)	El Barón Negro (hair)	N/A	Live event	N/A	
Estrella Blanca (mask)	El Buitre I (hair)	N/A	Live event	N/A	
Estrella Blanca (mask)	El Buitre II (hair)	N/A	Live event	N/A	
Estrella Blanca (mask)	El Capitán (hair)	N/A	Live event	N/A	
Estrella Blanca (mask)	El Capitán (hair)	N/A	Live event	N/A	
Estrella Blanca (mask)	El Cirujano (hair)	N/A	Live event	N/A	
Estrella Blanca (mask)	El Cirujano (hair)	N/A	Live event	N/A	
Estrella Blanca (mask)	El Comanche (hair)	N/A	Live event	N/A	
Estrella Blanca (mask)	El Cometa (mask)	N/A	Live event	N/A	
Estrella Blanca (mask)	El Condenado Maldito (hair)	N/A	Live event	N/A	
Estrella Blanca (mask)	El Errante (hair)	N/A	Live event	N/A	
Estrella Blanca (mask)	El Gavilán (hair)	N/A	Live event	N/A	
Estrella Blanca (mask)	El Gitano Maldito (hair)	N/A	Live event	N/A	
Estrella Blanca (mask)	El Hurón (hair)	N/A	Live event	N/A	
Estrella Blanca (mask)	El Hurón (hair)	N/A	Live event	N/A	
Estrella Blanca (mask)	El Incógnito (hair)	N/A	Live event	N/A	
Estrella Blanca (mask)	El Inquisidor (mask)	N/A	Live event	N/A	
Estrella Blanca (mask)	El Inquisidor (hair)	N/A	Live event	N/A	
Estrella Blanca (mask)	El Jorobado (hair)	N/A	Live event	N/A	
Estrella Blanca (mask)	El Leopardo (hair)	N/A	Live event	N/A	
Estrella Blanca (mask)	El Maya (hair)	N/A	Live event	N/A	
Estrella Blanca (mask)	El Navajo I (hair)	N/A	Live event	N/A	
Estrella Blanca (mask)	El Negro Feroz (hair)	N/A	Live event	N/A	
Estrella Blanca (mask)	El Olmeca (hair)	N/A	Live event	N/A	
Estrella Blanca (mask)	El Olmeca (hair)	N/A	Live event	N/A	
Estrella Blanca (mask)	El Perro Díaz (hair)	N/A	Live event	N/A	
Estrella Blanca (mask)	El Perro Díaz (hair)	N/A	Live event	N/A	
Estrella Blanca (mask)	El Polaco Maldito (hair)	N/A	Live event	N/A	
Estrella Blanca (mask)	El Pulpo (hair)	N/A	Live event	N/A	
Estrella Blanca (mask)	El Tarahumara (hair)	N/A	Live event	N/A	
Estrella Blanca (mask)	El Tigre (hair)	N/A	Live event	N/A	
Estrella Blanca (mask)	El Vaquero Rojo (hair)	N/A	Live event	N/A	
Estrella Blanca (mask)	El Yanqui (hair)	N/A	Live event	N/A	
Estrella Blanca (mask)	Enemigo (mask)	N/A	Live event	N/A	
Estrella Blanca (mask)	Engendro del Mal (mask)	N/A	Live event	N/A	
Estrella Blanca (mask)	Enigma Azul (mask)	N/A	Live event	N/A	
Estrella Blanca (mask)	Escarlata I (mask)	N/A	Live event	N/A	
Estrella Blanca (mask)	Escarlata II (mask)	N/A	Live event	N/A	
Estrella Blanca (mask)	Escorpión Negro (mask)	N/A	Live event	N/A	
Estrella Blanca (mask)	Espadachín (hair)	N/A	Live event	N/A	
Estrella Blanca (mask)	Espía Negro (mask)	N/A	Live event	N/A	
Estrella Blanca (mask)	Flecha (mask)	N/A	Live event	N/A	
Estrella Blanca (mask)	Gallito Colorado (mask)	N/A	Live event	N/A	
Estrella Blanca (mask)	Gangster (mask)	N/A	Live event	N/A	
Estrella Blanca (mask)	El Gato (mask)	N/A	Live event	N/A	
Estrella Blanca (mask)	Gato Montes (mask)	N/A	Live event	N/A	
Estrella Blanca (mask)	Gavilán (mask)	N/A	Live event	N/A	
Estrella Blanca (mask)	Gori Casanova (hair)	N/A	Live event	N/A	
Estrella Blanca (mask)	Gorila Osorio (hair)	N/A	Live event	N/A	
Estrella Blanca (mask)	Gorila Osorio (hair)	N/A	Live event	N/A	
Estrella Blanca (mask)	Gran Amenaza (mask)	N/A	Live event	N/A	
Estrella Blanca (mask)	Gran Morefas (hair)	N/A	Live event	N/A	
Estrella Blanca (mask)	Gran Morefas (hair)	N/A	Live event	N/A	
Estrella Blanca (mask)	Halcón De Plata (mask)	N/A	Live event	N/A	
Estrella Blanca (mask)	Hawaiano I (mask)	N/A	Live event	N/A	
Estrella Blanca (mask)	Hawaiano II (mask)	N/A	Live event	N/A	
Estrella Blanca (mask)	Hiena Roja (mask)	N/A	Live event	N/A	
Estrella Blanca (mask)	Hijo de los Dioses (mask)	N/A	Live event	N/A	
Estrella Blanca (mask)	Horóscopo (mask)	N/A	Live event	N/A	
Estrella Blanca (mask)	Hurón (mask)	N/A	Live event	N/A	
Estrella Blanca (mask)	Incógnito (mask)	N/A	Live event	N/A	
Estrella Blanca (mask)	Insepulto(mask)	N/A	Live event	N/A	
Estrella Blanca (mask)	Jaguar I (mask)	N/A	Live event	N/A	
Estrella Blanca (mask)	Jaguar II (mask)	N/A	Live event	N/A	
Estrella Blanca (mask)	Joel González (hair)	N/A	Live event	N/A	
Estrella Blanca (mask)	La Momia Del Perú I (hair)	N/A	Live event	N/A	
Estrella Blanca (mask)	La Momia Del Perú II (hair)	N/A	Live event	N/A	
Estrella Blanca (mask)	Lacandon II (mask)	N/A	Live event	N/A	
Estrella Blanca (mask)	Lalo Reynoso (hair)	N/A	Live event	N/A	
Estrella Blanca (mask)	Maldito (mask)	N/A	Live event	N/A	
Estrella Blanca (mask)	Malo (mask)	N/A	Live event	N/A	
Estrella Blanca (mask)	Manuel Robles (hair)	N/A	Live event	N/A	
Estrella Blanca (mask)	Maromero (mask)	N/A	Live event	N/A	
Estrella Blanca (mask)	Mascara Negra (mask)	N/A	Live event	N/A	
Estrella Blanca (mask)	Momia Del Perú I (mask)	N/A	Live event	N/A	
Estrella Blanca (mask)	Momia Del Perú II (mask)	N/A	Live event	N/A	
Estrella Blanca (mask)	Momia I (mask)	N/A	Live event	N/A	
Estrella Blanca (mask)	Momia II (mask)	N/A	Live event	N/A	
Estrella Blanca (mask)	Monje Loco (mask)	N/A	Live event	N/A	
Estrella Blanca (mask)	Moro (mask)	N/A	Live event	N/A	
Estrella Blanca (mask)	Mosquetero I (mask)	N/A	Live event	N/A	
Estrella Blanca (mask)	Mosquetero II (mask)	N/A	Live event	N/A	
Estrella Blanca (mask)	Mosquetero Negro (mask)	N/A	Live event	N/A	
Estrella Blanca (mask)	Mr Can (hair)	N/A	Live event	N/A	
Estrella Blanca (mask)	Mr Galaxia (mask)	N/A	Live event	N/A	
Estrella Blanca (mask)	Mr. Can (mask)	N/A	Live event	N/A	
Estrella Blanca (mask)	Mr. Flama (mask)	N/A	Live event	N/A	
Estrella Blanca (mask)	Mr. Tiempo (mask)	N/A	Live event	N/A	
Estrella Blanca (mask)	Murciélago Infernal (mask)	N/A	Live event	N/A	
Estrella Blanca (mask)	Ninja Negro (mask)	N/A	Live event	N/A	
Estrella Blanca (mask)	Olmeca Negro (mask)	N/A	Live event	N/A	
Estrella Blanca (mask)	Peregrino (mask)	N/A	Live event	N/A	
Estrella Blanca (mask)	Perro Negro (mask)	N/A	Live event	N/A	
Estrella Blanca (mask)	Piel Roja (hair)	N/A	Live event	N/A	
Estrella Blanca (mask)	Pokarito Ramírez (hair)	N/A	Live event	N/A	
Estrella Blanca (mask)	Porthos (hair)	N/A	Live event	N/A	
Estrella Blanca (mask)	Príncipe Negro (mask)	N/A	Live event	N/A	
Estrella Blanca (mask)	Puma (mask)	N/A	Live event	N/A	
Estrella Blanca (mask)	Ray Gutiérrez (hair)	N/A	Live event	N/A	
Estrella Blanca (mask)	Ray Mejia (hair)	N/A	Live event	N/A	
Estrella Blanca (mask)	Ray Richard (hair)	N/A	Live event	N/A	
Estrella Blanca (mask)	Ray Tapia (hair)	N/A	Live event	N/A	
Estrella Blanca (mask)	Relámpago Azul (mask)	N/A	Live event	N/A	
Estrella Blanca (mask)	Rodolfo Ruiz (hair)	N/A	Live event	N/A	
Estrella Blanca (mask)	Rodolfo Ruiz (hair)	N/A	Live event	N/A	
Estrella Blanca (mask)	Rudy Valentino (hair)	N/A	Live event	N/A	
Estrella Blanca (mask)	Rugido (mask)	N/A	Live event	N/A	
Estrella Blanca (mask)	Saeta Negra (hair)	N/A	Live event	N/A	
Estrella Blanca (mask)	Sandokan (hair)	N/A	Live event	N/A	
Estrella Blanca (mask)	Satanás (mask)	N/A	Live event	N/A	
Estrella Blanca (mask)	Secreto (mask)	N/A	Live event	N/A	
Estrella Blanca (mask)	Shuriken (mask)	N/A	Live event	N/A	
Estrella Blanca (mask)	Silver Fox (mask)	N/A	Live event	N/A	
Estrella Blanca (mask)	Simbad (hair)	N/A	Live event	N/A	
Estrella Blanca (mask)	Sismo Infernal (mask)	N/A	Live event	N/A	
Estrella Blanca (mask)	Sombra Nazi (mask)	N/A	Live event	N/A	
Estrella Blanca (mask)	Starman (mask)	N/A	Live event	N/A	
Estrella Blanca (mask)	Tarahumara (mask)	N/A	Live event	N/A	
Estrella Blanca (mask)	Thor (mask)	N/A	Live event	N/A	
Estrella Blanca (mask)	Tigre Español (hair)	N/A	Live event	N/A	
Estrella Blanca (mask)	Tony Grimaldo (hair)	N/A	Live event	N/A	
Estrella Blanca (mask)	Tony Grimaldo (hair)	N/A	Live event	N/A	
Estrella Blanca (mask)	Torbellino Cruz (hair)	N/A	Live event	N/A	
Estrella Blanca (mask)	Tormenta Negra (mask)	N/A	Live event	N/A	
Estrella Blanca (mask)	Ventarrón (hair)	N/A	Live event	N/A	
Estrella Blanca (mask)	Ventarrón (hair)	N/A	Live event	N/A	
Estrella Blanca (mask)	Venusino (mask)	N/A	Live event	N/A	
Estrella Blanca (mask)	Vértigo (hair)	N/A	Live event	N/A	
Estrella Blanca (mask)	Volter (mask)	N/A	Live event	N/A	
Estrella Blanca (mask)	Volter (hair)	N/A	Live event	N/A	
Estrella Blanca (mask)	Yoyo Garduño (hair)	N/A	Live event	N/A	
Estrella Blanca (mask)	Yoyo Garduño (hair)	N/A	Live event	N/A	
Estrella Blanca (mask)	Zombi (mask)	N/A	Live event	N/A	
Estrella Blanca (mask)	Zopilote (mask)	N/A	Live event	N/A	
Estrella Blanca (mask)	Sandokan (hair)	N/A	Live event	1960s	
Estrella Blanca (mask)	El Dorado (mask)	N/A	Live event	1960s	
Estrella Blanca (mask)	El Carnicerito (hair)	N/A	Live event	1960s	
Estrella Blanca (mask)	Pirata Negro (hair)	N/A	Live event	1960s	
Estrella Blanca (mask)	Gorila Osorio (hair)	N/A	Live event	1960s	
Estrella Blanca (mask)	Yoyo Garduño (hair)	N/A	Live event	1960s	
Estrella Blanca (mask)	El Tiburón (hair)	N/A	Live event	1960s	
Estrella Blanca (mask)	El Blasfemo (mask)	Puebla, Puebla	Live event	July 65	
Estrella Blanca (mask)	Angel Negro (mask)	Mexico City (Arena Coliseo)	Live event	August 16, 1966	
Estrella Blanca (mask)	As Negro (mask)	N/A	Live event	1968	
Estrella Blanca (mask)	Tauro (mask)	Mexico City	Live event	February 26, 1972	
Estrella Blanca (mask)	Tupamaro II (mask)	Xalapa, Veracruz	Live event	1974	
Estrella Blanca (mask)	El Polaco (mask)	Puebla, Puebla	Live event	September 1, 1974	
Estrella Blanca (mask)	Huroki Sito (hair)	Mexico City	Live event	August 2, 1975	
Estrella Blanca (mask)	Braulio Mendoza (hair)	Chilpancingo, Guerrero	Live event	August 28, 1975	
Estrella Blanca (mask)	Dick Angelo (hair)	Puebla, Puebla	Live event	July 18, 1976	
Estrella Blanca (mask)	Irazu (mask)	Mexico City	Live event	1977	
Estrella Blanca and Vagabundo (mask)	Los Hermanos Inferno (mask)	Guadalajara, Jalisco	Live event	1977	
Ultraman and Estrella Blanca (mask)	Zeus and Pantera Azul (mask)	Mexico City	Live event	June 19, 1977	
Gallo Tapado (mask), Estrella Blanca (mask) and Máscara Roja (mask)	Babe Sharon, Bello Greco and Sergio (hair)	Mexico City	Live event	June 26, 1977	
Estrella Blanca (mask)	Chamaco Richard (hair)	Puebla, Puebla	Live event	August 20, 1977	
Estrella Blanca (mask)	Increible (mask)	N/A	Live event	1977	
Estrella Blanca (mask)	Super Libre (mask)	Cuautitlan, State of Mexico	Live event	1978	
Estrella Blanca (mask)	Barba Negra (hair)	Puebla, Puebla	Live event	March 12, 1978	
Estrella Blanca (mask)	Destino Negro (hair)	Puebla, Puebla	Live event	June 9, 1978	
Estrella Blanca (mask)	Scorpio (hair)	Veracruz	Live event	August 29, 1979	
Estrella Blanca (mask)	Desalmado (hair)	Puebla, Puebla	Live event	February 2, 1983	
Estrella Blanca (mask)	Manuel Robles (hair)	Puebla, Puebla	Live event	March 20, 1983	
Estrella Blanca I and II (masks)	Los Navajos (masks)	Puebla, Puebla	Live event	June 26, 1983	
Estrella Blanca I and II (masks)	Los Demoniacos (masks)	Puebla, Puebla	Live event	August 2, 1983	
Estrella Blanca (mask)	Dr. Killer (mask)	N/A	Live event	September 1, 1985	
