= CMLL Super Viernes =

Mexican professional wrestling show series

CMLL Super Viernes (Spanish for "CMLL Super Fridays"), also known as CMLL Viernes Espectaculares (Spanish for "CMLL Spectacular Fridays"), is the Mexican professional wrestling promotion Consejo Mundial de Lucha Libre (CMLL)'s banner event that takes place every Friday in Arena México in Mexico City, Mexico. The shows take place every Friday all year long, except when CMLL schedules a "supercard" or a pay-per-view (PPV) to take its place since almost all CMLL PPVs and supercards take place on Friday nights in Arena México.

== Event history ==
Founded in 1933 as Empresa Mexicana de Lucha Libre (EMLL) and renamed in 1990, Consejo Mundial de Lucha Libre (CMLL) is the world's oldest professional wrestling promotion still active today. Unlike most wrestling promotions in the world CMLL generally does not tour, preferring to hold weekly events in the same buildings on the same nights, only rarely promoting shows in other venues. The Super Viernes shows dates back to at least 1938 (maybe even 1934), making it the longest-running professional wrestling weekly show of any kind. Super Viernes was originally held in Arena Modelo, then moved to Arena Coliseo in the 1950s and finally moved to Arena México in 1956 upon the completion of the building. Since 1956, CMLL has held their Super Viernes events on every Friday night except for when the promotion takes a break at the end of the year, when they promote a supercard or PPV on Friday night, or due to circumstances beyond CMLL's control.

Three notable events have interrupted CMLL's Friday night lucha libre shows. The 1985 Mexico City earthquake stopped the Super Viernes shows until it was determined that Arena México was structurally sound. In the spring and summer of 2009 the swine flu pandemic shut down Arena México shows for a couple of weeks after the government urged people not to gather in large groups while the pandemic was at its worst. In 2020, Super Viernes was paused between June and August due to COVID-19. It resumed in September 2020, with events starting again that first week.

== Event significance ==
CMLL Super Viernes is CMLL's biggest and most important weekly show; it generally draws the largest crowds and features the biggest stars of CMLL in the main events. CMLL wrestlers say that working in Arena México on Friday nights is the "mark of approval" for young wrestlers. Super Viernes has seen many championship matches and changes over the years and also been the site for many Luchas de Apuestas, or bet matches, where wrestlers put either their mask or hair on the line. While CMLL is not as storyline-driven as other companies such as World Wrestling Entertainment (WWE), All Elite Wrestling (AEW), or New Japan Pro-Wrestling (NJPW), the most important storylines or feud that are promoted in CMLL play out during the Super Viernes shows.

The Friday night Arena México shows normally host all of CMLL's annual tournaments; Super Viernes has hosted tournaments such as the Torneo Gran Alternativa, Leyenda de Plata, Leyenda de Azul, International Gran Prix, Reyes del Aire, La Copa Junior, and Campeonato Universal. From 1999 to 2001, Super Viernes also hosted the Copa Arena México trios tournament.

== Other Shows ==
As of 2026, CMLL runs 6 shows per week, over 5 days, across 4 arenas, in 3 cities. Each of which tends to follow its own week-to-week continuity, somewhat like WWE RAW & Smackdown:

- CMLL Super Viernes (Super Friday) - see above.
- CMLL Sabados De Coliseo (Saturdays at the Coliseo) - takes place at CMLL's smaller older Mexico City venue, Arena Coliseo. 3.4km (approx. 10 minute drive) from Arena Mexico. Attracts a more dedicated lucha libre fanbase. The building was completed on April 2, 1943, although Saturday shows predate its existence.
- CMLL Domingo Familiar (Family Sunday) - tertiary Arena Mexico show, with an afternoon matinee start time & typically more casual low-stakes action appropriate for families. Has been running at least as long as Super Viernes. Was neither taped nor broadcast on a weekly basis until 2026.
- CMLL Lunes Clasico (Classic Monday) - takes place in Arena Puebla, Puebla, Puebla, 135km (approx. 2 hour drive) south-east of Mexico City. Arena Puebla was inaugurated by CMLL on July 18, 1953, and Lunes shows specifically have been running since at least 1993.
- CMLL Martes Populares (Popular Tuesday) - secondary Arena Mexico show. Typically features more lower-card talent who could not fit onto a given Viernes card, ala WCW Thunder or AEW Collision. Sems to have been running since at least 1935 in Arena Modelo (the original "Arena Mexico").
- CMLL Martes De Glamour (Glamor Tuesday) - takes place in Arena Coliseo Guadalajara, Guadalajara, Jalisco, 550km (approx. 6.5 hour driver) north-west of Mexico City. As of 2026, it is the only weekly card that isn't broadcast live, instead being edited for release on Thursday nights. EMLL opened the arena on June 20, 1959, whilst Tuesday shows have been recorded as early as 1965.

Wednesday is when CMLL uploads its editions of CMLL Informa, a talk show that reflects on major developments of the past week & announces matches for the upcoming one. Combined with the Martes De Glamour tape delay, this allows CMLL to disseminate routine content every day of the week.

As Super Viernes is the flagship event, all other events depend on local talent to fill out the cards. As such, each city tends to draw from a different "roster" for the opening matches.
