= List of Consejo Mundial de Lucha Libre personnel =

List of professional wrestlers working for CMLL

This is the Consejo Mundial de Lucha Libre (CMLL) roster, a list of professional wrestlers who work for the Mexican professional wrestling promotion CMLL. The alias (ring name) of the worker listed while the real name is not listed, most luchadores (wrestlers) keep their real name private, and as such, most are not a matter of public record. If a wrestler is inactive for any reason (due to injury, suspension, not wrestling for 30 days or other), that information is noted in the notes section. Other wrestlers have made guest appearances, especially North American wrestlers who have made special guest appearances, but unless they work a series of shows for CMLL, they will not be listed as part of the general roster.

The face/heel divide is far more explicit in lucha libre than in other forms of pro wrestling. With members of either locker-room openly acknowledging their philosophical allegiance to one over the other, and matches that mix the teams being especially labelled as Relevos increíbles. As such, a key used to denote their affinity.

== Male wrestlers ==
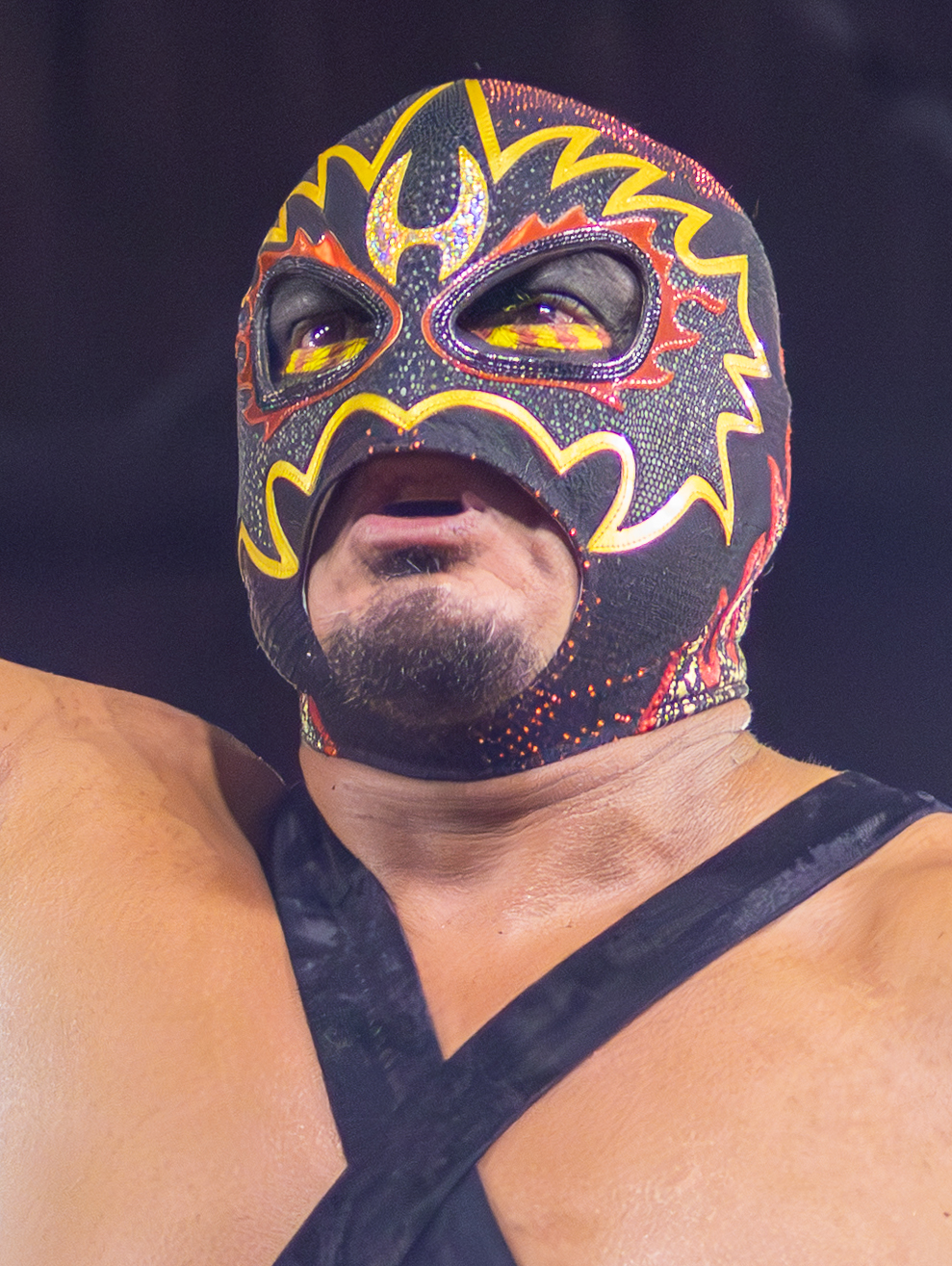
Hechicero

Místico

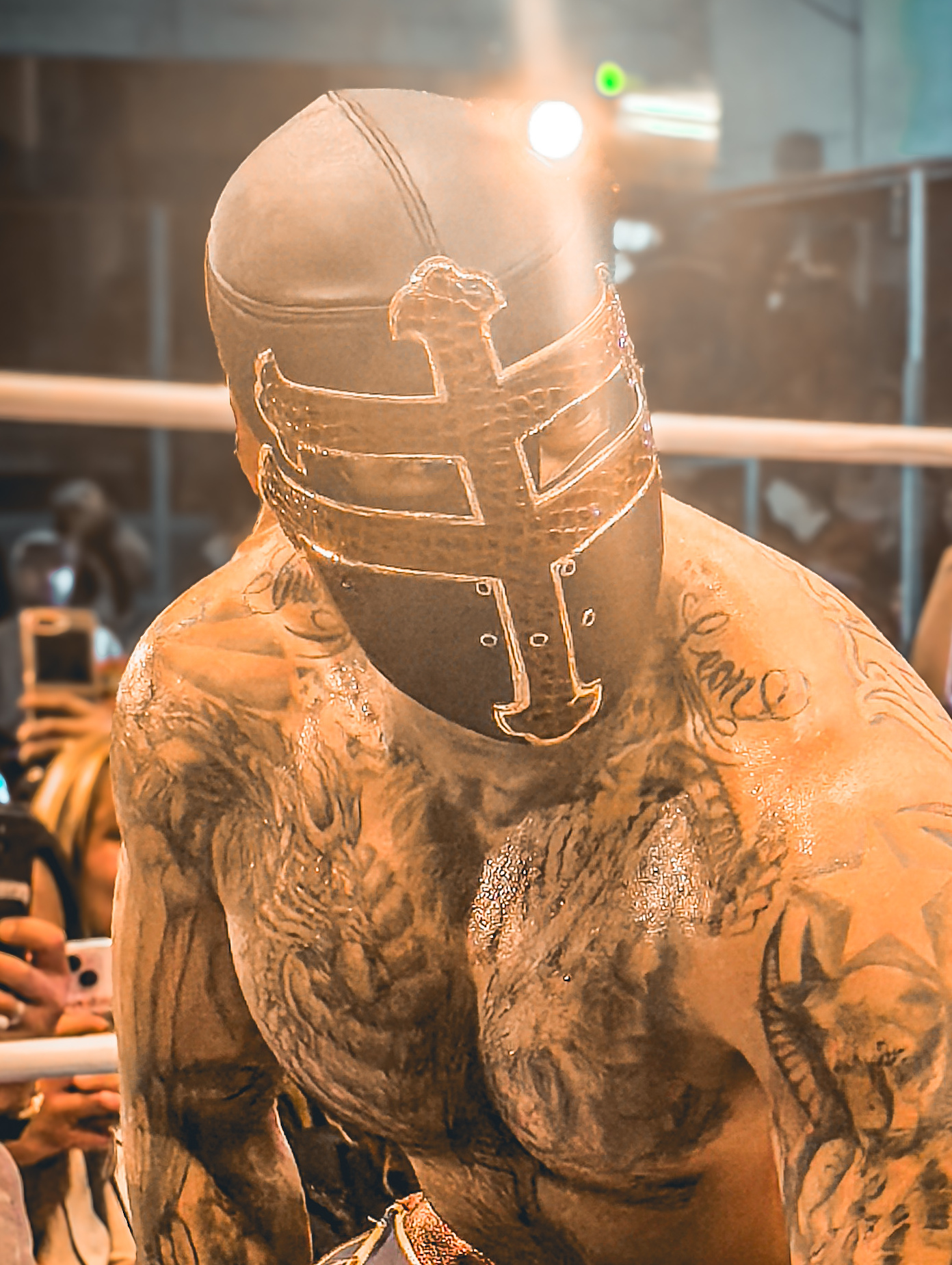
Templario

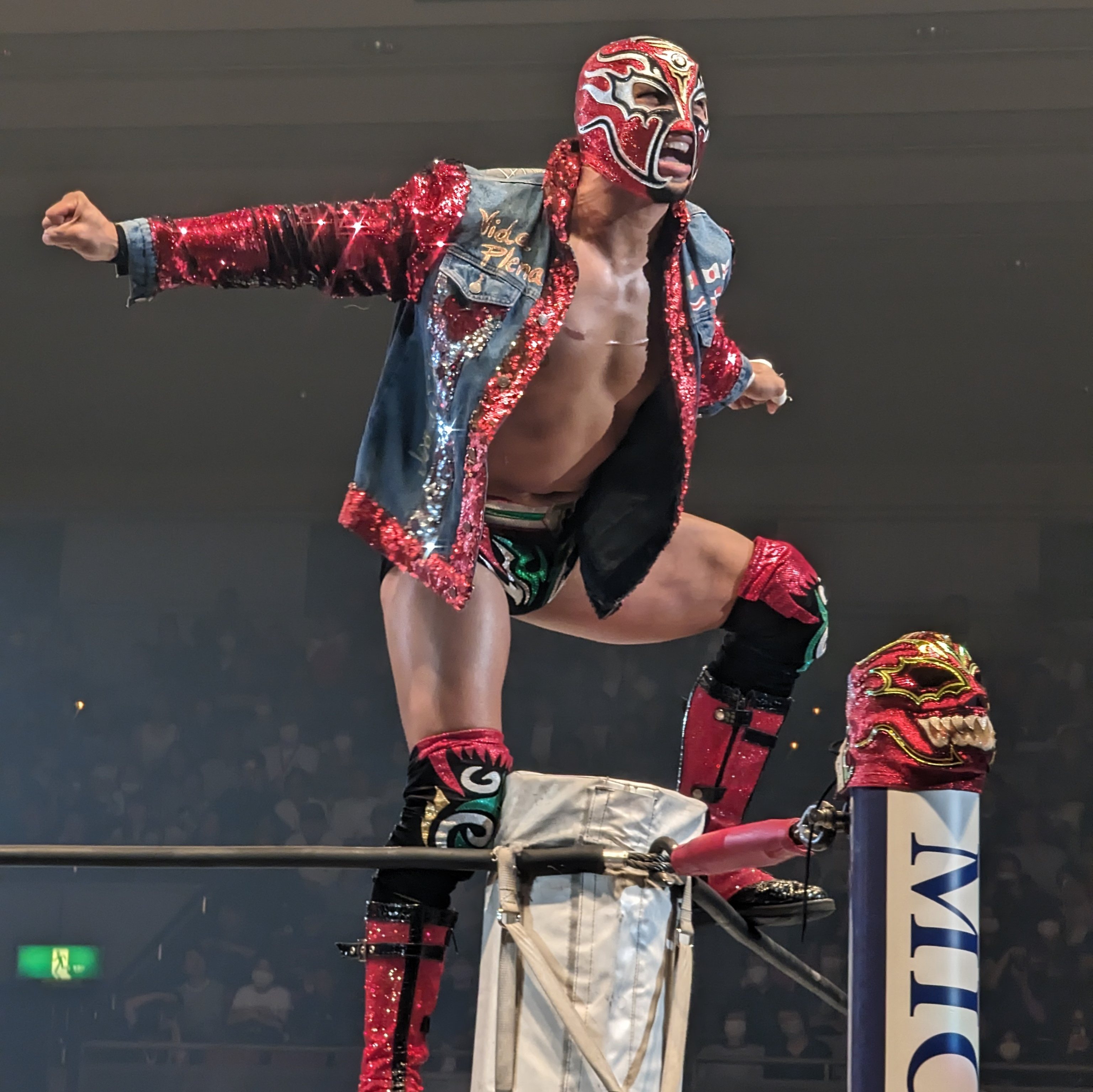
Titán

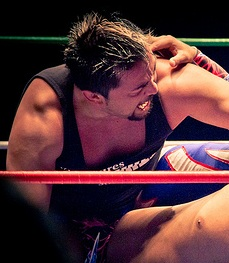
Averno

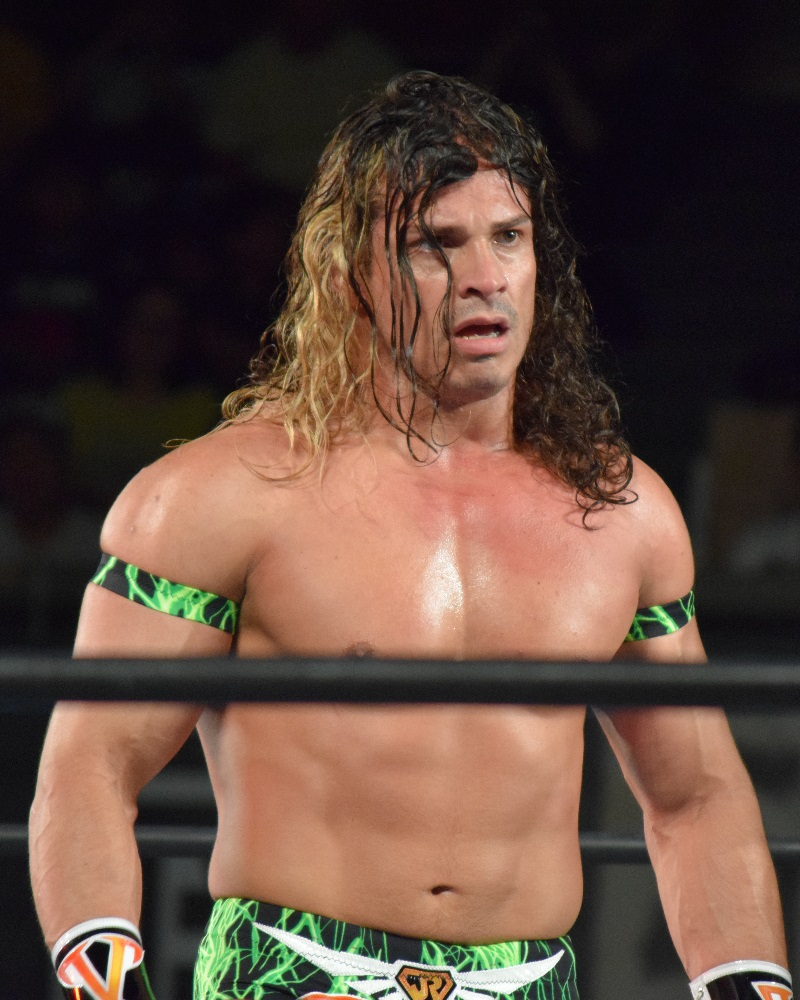
Volador Jr.

Máscara Dorada

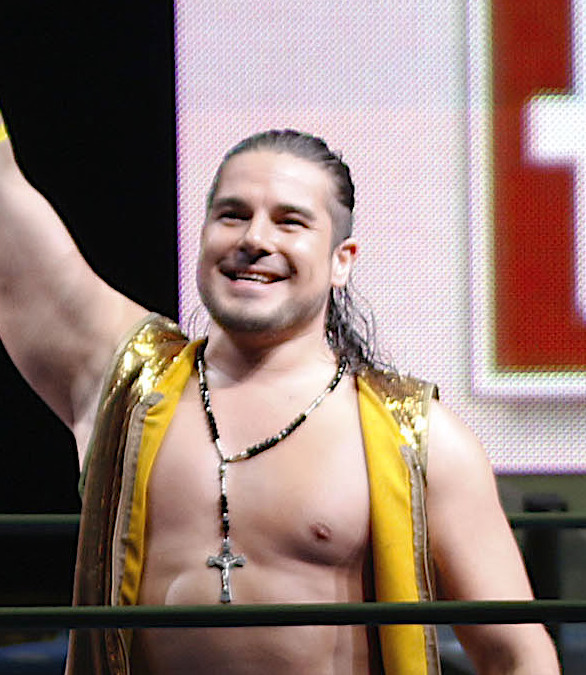
Ángel de Oro

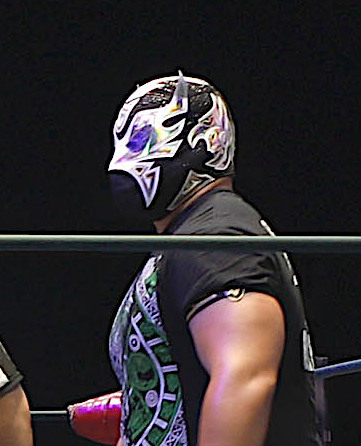
Niebla Roja

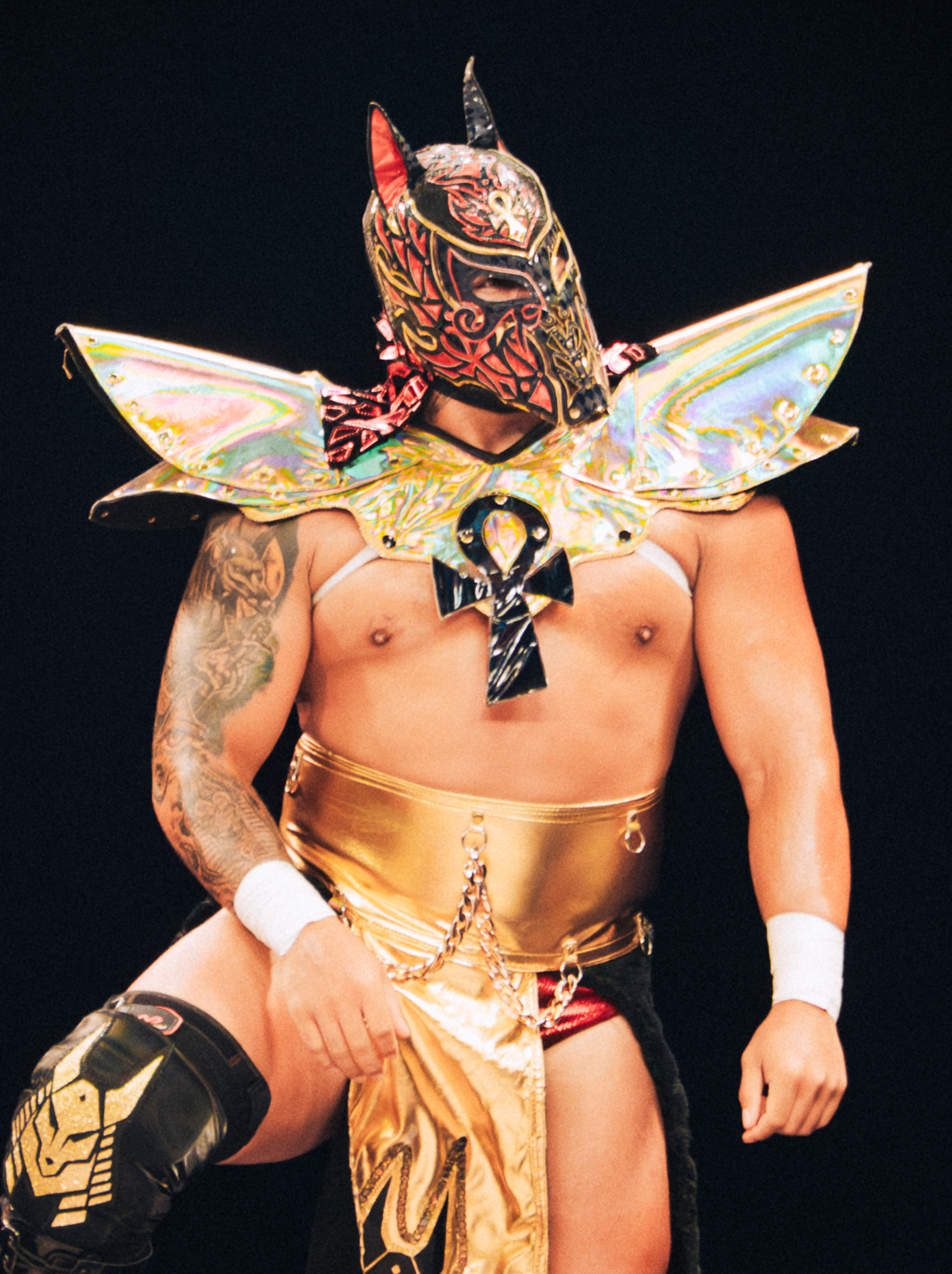
Esfinge

Guerrero Maya Jr.

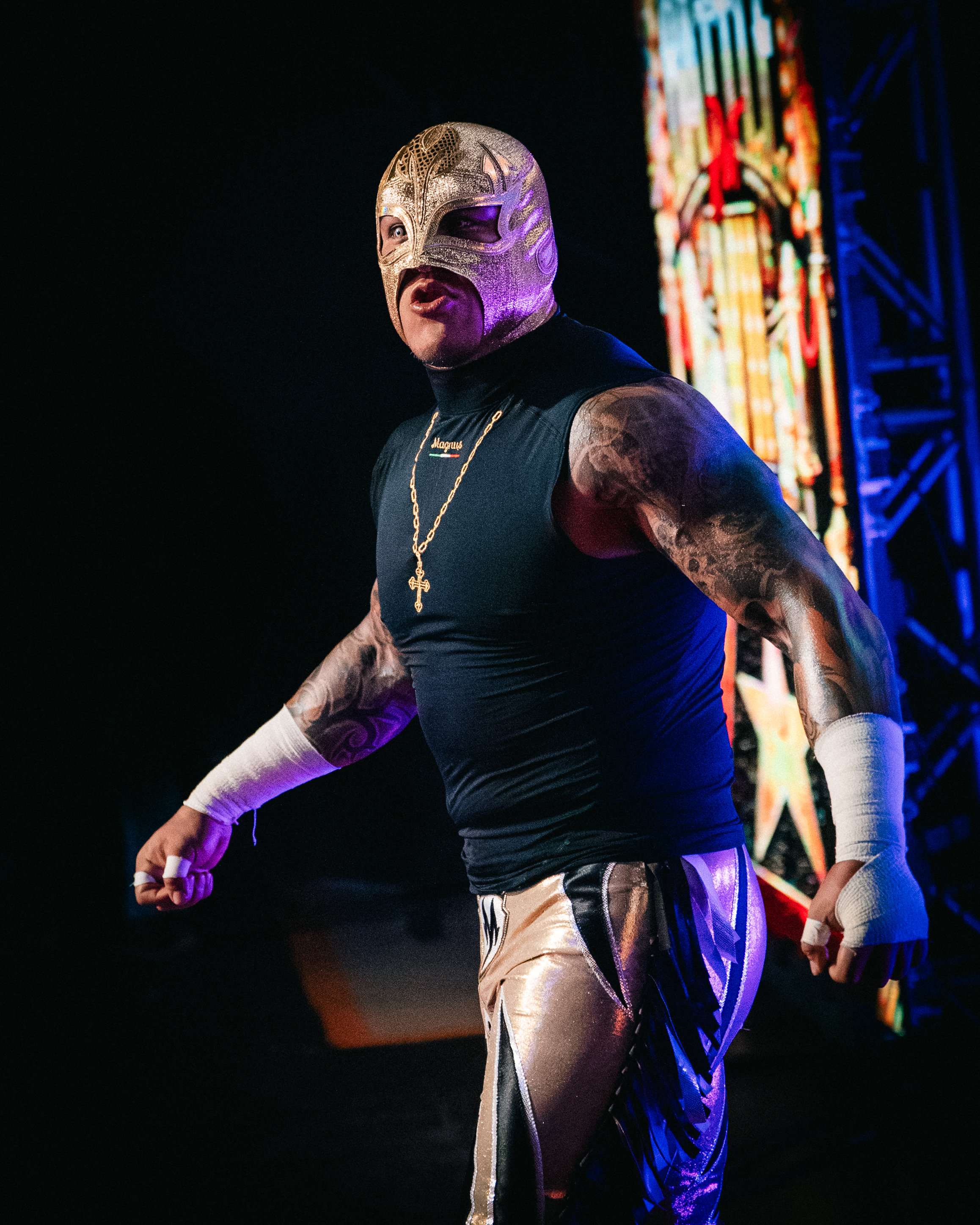
Black Tiger

Caption text
Alignment	Label
Técnico	(T)
Rudo	(R)
Inconsistent	(?)

Ring name	Real name	Notes
Akuma (R)	José Luis Florencio Martínez	Leader of Las Bestias Del Diablo
Ángel de Oro (R)	Miguel Ángel Chávez Velasco	CMLL World Tag Team Champion; Member of Los Hermanos Chavez; Member of nameless faction #1
Apocalipsis (R)	Juan Contreras Uribe	Last seen June 2025
Arkalis (T)	Undisclosed (Note: In lucha libre the true identity, birth name etc. of masked wrestlers is kept secret from the general public. News does not report nor speculate on real names even if they may be able to find them out, out of respect for the Lucha Libre traditions.)	Member of La Fuerza Poblana
Atlantis (T)	Undisclosed	
Atlantis Jr. (T)	Undisclosed	
Audaz (T)	Undisclosed	
Averno (R)	Renato Ruiz	NWA World Historic Light Heavyweight Champion; Leader of Los Infernales
Bárbaro Cavernario (R)	Leonardo Moreno Ayala	Member of nameless faction #1
Barboza (R)	Undisclosed	Member of El Galeon Fantasma
Bengala (T)	Undisclosed	Injured; Last seen February 2024
Black Tiger (R) (Magnus)	Undisclosed	Mexican National Tag Team Champion; Member of Las Fieras del Ring
Blue Panther (T)	Genaro Vazquez Nevarez	CMLL booking staff Patriarch of Los Divinos Laguneros
El Hijo de Blue Panther (T)	Undisclosed	Member of Los Divinos Laguneros
Blue Panther Jr. (T)	Undisclosed	Member of Los Divinos Laguneros
Brillante Jr. (T)	Undisclosed	Member of Las Gemas Metálicas
Calavera Jr. I (R)	Undisclosed	CMLL Arena Coliseo Tag Team Champion; Mexican National Lightweight Champion
Calavera Jr. II (R)	Undisclosed	CMLL Arena Coliseo Tag Team Champion
Cancerbero (R)	Daniel Nuñez Hernandez	Member of Los Cancerberos del Infierno
Capitán Suicida (T)	Undisclosed	Mexican National Welterweight Champion
Cholo (R)	Carlos Soriano Mendoza	Last seen June 2025
Claudio Castagnoli (R)	Claudio Castagnoli	dual-contract with AEW
El Cobarde (R)	Undisclosed	Mexican National Trios Champion; Member of Los Herederos
El Coyote (R)	Undisclosed	Member of Los Forajidos
Dark Magic (R)	Chayton Gamba	Member of La Ola Negra
Dark Panther (T)	Undisclosed	Member of Los Divinos Laguneros
Diamond (T)	Undisclosed	Member of Las Gemas Metálicas
Difunto (R)	Undisclosed	Member of El Galeon Fantasma
Disturbio (R)	Israel Aguilar Alvarez	
Dragon de Fuego (T)	Undisclosed	Member of Los Mitologicos Dragons
Dragon Legendario (T)	Undisclosed	Member of Los Mitologicos Dragons
Dragón Rojo Jr. (T)	Anselmo Rivas Castro	Leader of Los Mitologicos Dragons
Dulce Gardenia (T)	Javier Márquez Gómez	Member of nameless faction #2
Eléctrico (T)	Undisclosed	
El Elemental (R)	Undisclosed	Member of La Maquina de la Destruccion
Esfinge (T)	Undisclosed	Mexican National Light Heavyweight Champion; Member of La Fuerza Tapatia
Espanto Jr. (R)	Undisclosed	Member of La Ola Negra
Espiritu Negro (T)	Juan Manuel González Olalde	Member of Atrapasuenos
Euforia (R)	José Leobardo Moreno León	Member of Los Infernales
Explosivo (R)	Undisclosed	Member of La Maquina de la Destruccion
El Felino (R)	Jorge Casas Ruiz	Commentator (Televisa)
Felino Jr. (R)	Undisclosed	Mexican National Trios Champion; Member of Los Herederos
Flip Gordon (T)	Travis Lopes Jr.	on hiatus
Fuego (T)	Undisclosed	Member of nameless faction #2
Fugaz (T)	Undisclosed	Member of La Fuerza Tapatia
Furia Roja (R)	Ivan Alejandro Lemus Perez	Occidente Trios Champion; Member of El Galeon Fantasma
Futuro (T)	Undisclosed	Member of Los Viajeros Del Espacio
Gallero (R)	Undisclosed	Member of La Ola Negra
Gallo Jr. (T)	Undisclosed	Occidente Tag Team Champion; Member of La Fuerza Tapatia
Gemelo Diablo I (R)	Undisclosed	Member of Las Bestias Del Diablo
Gemelo Diablo II (R)	Undisclosed	Member of Las Bestias Del Diablo
Gran Guerrero (R)	Undisclosed	Member of Los Guerreros Laguneros
Guerrero Maya Jr. (T)	Undisclosed	Member of Los Reyes del Inframundo
Hechicero (R)	Undisclosed	CMLL World Heavyweight Champion; Commentator (Televisa)
Hombre Bala Jr. (T)	Undisclosed	Member of Los Viajeros Del Espacio
Inquisidor (R)	Juan Miguel Escalante Grande	
Leono (T)	Unknown	Last seen February 2026
Magia Blanca (T)	Undisclosed	Trainer; Member of Los Amos del Aire
Máquina Letal (R)	Jorge González Ruiz	Member of La Maquina de la Destruccion
Máscara Dorada (T)	Undisclosed	CMLL World Trios Champion; NWA World Historic Welterweight Championship; Member of El Sky Team
Max Star (T)	Undisclosed	Member of Los Viajeros Del Espacio
Mephisto (R)	Undisclosed	Member of Los Infernales
Místico (T)	Luis Urive Alvirde	CMLL World Light Heavyweight Champion; CMLL World Trios Champion; Leader of El Sky Team
Neón (T)	Undisclosed	CMLL World Trios Champion; Member of El Sky Team
Niebla Roja (R)	Sergio Raymundo Chávez Velasco	CMLL World Tag Team Champion; Member of Los Hermanos Chavez; Member of nameless faction #1
Nitro (R)	Undisclosed	Wrestler's Union Secretary-General
Okumura (R)	Shigeo Okumura	
Oro Jr. (T)	Undisclosed	Member of Las Gemas Metálicas
Pantera (T)	Francisco Javier Pozas	Patriarch of Los Panteras
El Hijo del Pantera (T)	Undisclosed	Member of Los Panteras
Pantera Jr. (T)	Undisclosed	Member of Los Panteras
Panterita del Ring (T)	Undisclosed	
Pegasso (T)	Christian Saldaña	Last seen January 2026; Currently suspended Trainer (Puebla); Member of La Fuerza Poblana
Pólvora (R)	José Luis Grande Escalante	Member of Los Forajidos
Raider (R)	Undisclosed	Member of La Ola Negra
Rayo Metálico (T)	Undisclosed	Member of La Fuerza Poblana
Rey Cometa (T)	Mario González	Trainer (Querétaro); Member of Atrapasuenos
Rey Pegasus (T)	Undisclosed	Mexican National Middleweight Champion; Member of Los Amos del Aire
Robin (R)	Robin Ivan Alvarado Dominguez	Member of Los Kamikaez del Ring
Rocky Romero (R)	John Rivera	dual-contract with AEW
Rugido (R)	Undisclosed	Mexican National Tag Team Champion; Member of Las Fieras del Ring
Shoma Kato (R)	Shoma Kato	On learning excursion from New Japan Pro-Wrestling
Soberano Jr. (R)	Undisclosed	Member of nameless faction #1
Star Jr. (T)	Isaías Hernández López	
Star Black (T)	Undisclosed	Member of La Fuerza Tapatia
Stigma (T)	Undisclosed	CMLL World Lightweight Champion; Member of La Fuerza Poblana
Stuka Jr. (R)	Omar Alvarado García	Member of Los Guerreros Laguneros
Hijo de Stuka Jr. (R)	Undisclosed	Mexican National Trios Champion; Member of Los Herederos
Templario (T)	Undisclosed	CMLL World Middleweight Champion
El Terrible (R)	Damián Gutiérrez Hernández	Leader of La Maquina de la Destruccion
Titán (T)	Undisclosed	CMLL World Welterweight Champion
Tornado (T)	Undisclosed	Member of Los Amos del Aire
Último Guerrero (R)	José Gutiérrez Hernández	CMLL booking staff Trainer; Leader of Los Guerreros Laguneros
Valiente (R)	Fernando Vega	
Valiente Jr. (T)	Undisclosed	Member of Los Viajeros Del Espacio
Vaquero Jr. (R)	Unknown	Member of Los Forajidos
Vegas Depredador (R)	Undisclosed	Mexican National Light Heavyweight Champion; Member of Los Depredadores
El Hijo del Villano III (R)	Diaz Mendoza; First name not revealed	Member of Los Villanos
Villano III Jr. (R)	Undisclosed	Member of Los Villanos
Virus (R)	Ricardo Amezquita Carreño	Trainer; Member of Los Cancerberos del Infierno
Volador Jr. (R)	Ramón Ibarra Rivera	NWA World Historic Middleweight Champion; Trainer; Leader of Los Depredadores
Volcano (T)	Undisclosed	Member of nameless faction #2
Xelhua (T)	Undisclosed	Rey del Inframundo Champion; Member of Los Reyes del Inframundo
Yutani (R)	Unknown	Member of nameless faction #1
Zandokan Jr. (R)	Undisclosed	Occidente Middleweight Champion; Leader of El Galeon Fantasma

== Amazonas ==
CMLL's official term for their core contracted female roster of luchadoras.

Persephone

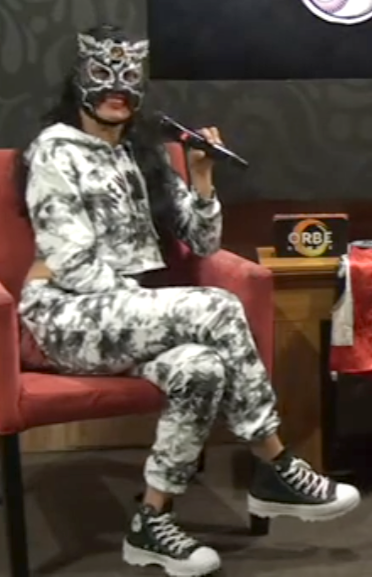
India Sioux

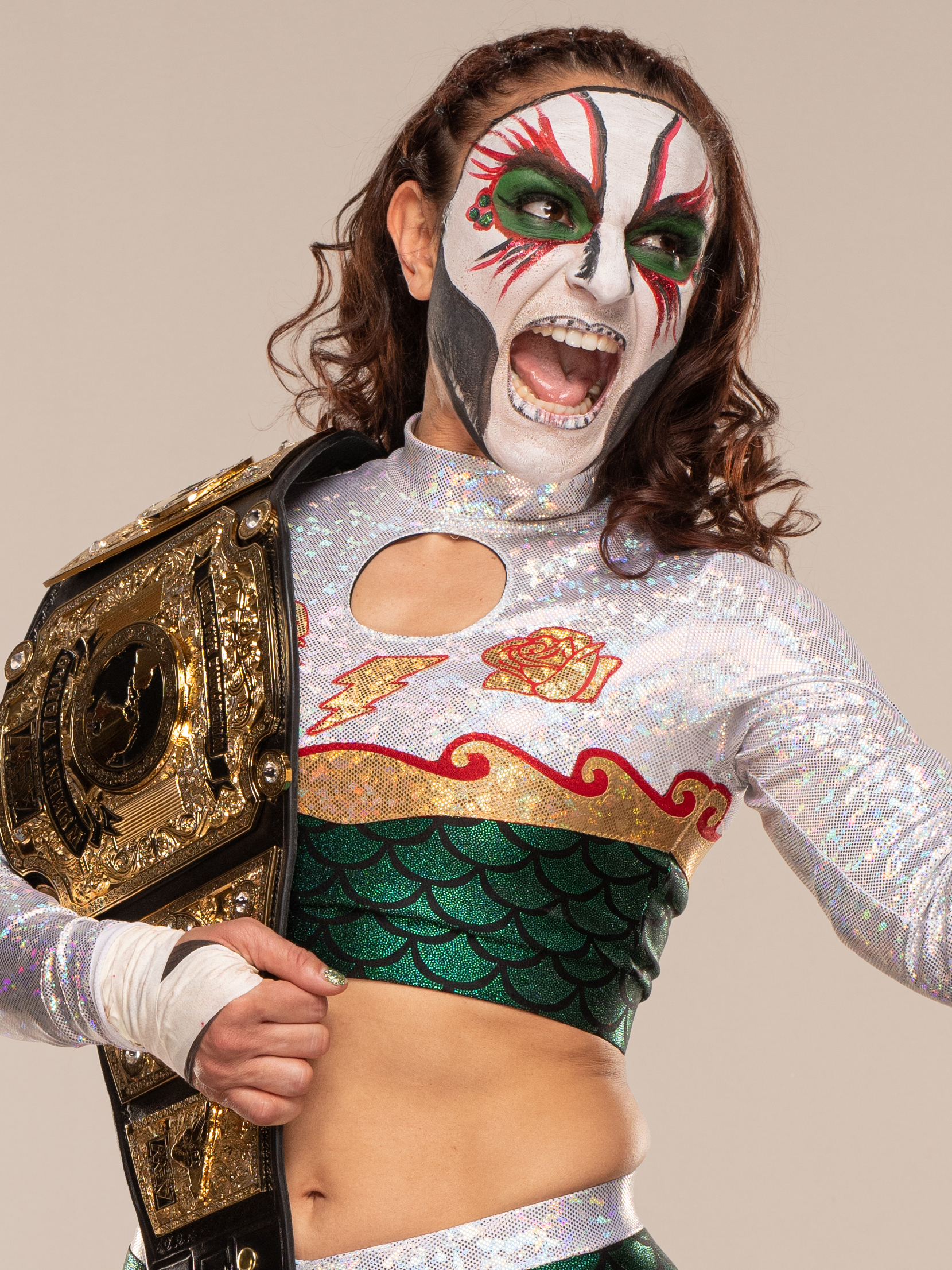
Thunder Rosa

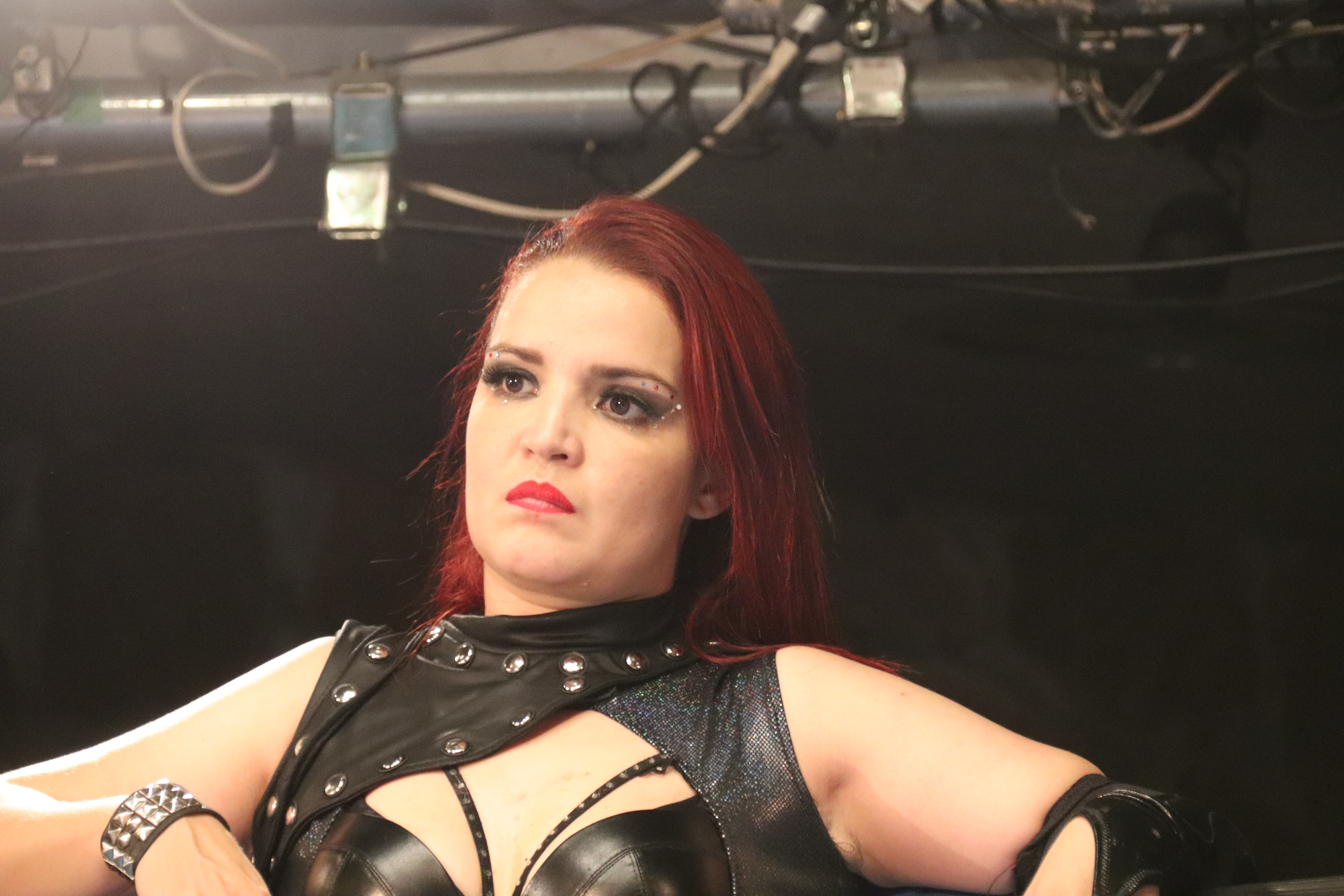
Silueta

Ring name	Real name	Notes
La Amapola (R)	Guadalupe Olvera	Last seen April 2025
Garra Negra (T)	Undisclosed	
Hecate (T)	Unknown	
Hera (R)	Undisclosed	Mexican National Women's Tag Team Champion
India Sioux (T)	Undisclosed	CMLL Japan Women's Champion
La Jarochita (T)	Undisclosed	CMLL World Women's Tag Team Champion; Injured; Member of Las Chicas Indomables
Johnnie Robbie (T)		
Keyra (R)	Undisclosed	Member of Las Reinas del Strong Style
Kira (T)	Undisclosed	
Lluvia (T)	Undisclosed	CMLL World Women's Tag Team Champion; Occidente Women's Champion; Member of Las Chicas Indomables; Member of Las Infernales
La Magnifica (T)	Tamara Rubí Barrón García	
Marcela (T)	María Santamaría Gómez	
La Metálica (R)	Undisclosed	
Olympia (R)	Undisclosed	Mexican National Women's Tag Team Champion
Persephone (R)	Priscilla Miranda	CMLL World Women's Champion
Princesa Sugehit (R)	Ernestina Sugehit Salazar Martínez	
Reyna Isis (R)	Yaksiry Palacios	
Sanely (R)	Undisclosed	
Dark Silueta (R)	Joana Jiménez Hernández	Occidente Women's Tag Team Champion; Member of Las Infernales
Skadi (T)	Undisclosed	
Tessa Blanchard (T)	Tessa Blanchard	
Thunder Rosa (T)	Melissa Cervantes	Mexican National Women's Champion dual-contract with AEW
Valkiria (R)	Undisclosed	Member of Las Infernales
Zeuxis (R)	Undisclosed	Occidente Women's Tag Team Champion; Member of Las Reinas del Strong Style; Member of Las Infernales

== Primera Lucha ==
As CMLL runs weekly broadcast shows in three states, they rely on local talent to fill out the opening matches on most cards. Colloquially referred to as the "primera lucha" ("first fight") wrestlers, they are very rarely featured in week-to-week angles, folded into higher-card groups, or booked in other states besides their home base. Those in Guadalajara & Puebla aren't even necessarily considered "official" CMLL employees.

The hierarchy in CMLL tends to be much stricter than in other wrestling cultures, due to their pay structure. With many primera lucha being expected to simply fill that specific role on a card indefinitely with little chance of upward momentum. Nonetheless, many are simply placed in the position to gain experience for potential pushes later, multiple top CMLL stars started out as Puebla/Guadalajara locals, and annual tournaments like the Gran Alternativa provide consistent opportunities to prove oneself to the company & break through.

=== Mexico City Roster ===
Ring name	Real name	Notes
Alexius (T)	Undisclosed	Member of Los Hijos del Olimpo
Astral (T)	Undisclosed	Member of Los Hijos del Olimpo
Carnifice (R)	Undisclosed	
Cerebro Negro Jr. (R)	Undisclosed	
Crixus (R)	Undisclosed	
Estudiante Jr. (R)	Undisclosed	
Feroz (R)	Undisclosed	
Fury Boy (T)	Undisclosed	
Kamelot (R)	Undisclosed	
Hunter (R)	Undisclosed	
Infarto (R)	Undisclosed	
Infinito (T)	Undisclosed	
Karma I (T)	Undisclosed	
Kimba (R)	Undisclosed	(Probationary) Member of Los Depredadores
King Rex (R)	Undisclosed	Member of Los Dinohermanos
Magnético (T)	Undisclosed	
Makará (R)	Undisclosed	Member of Los Reyes del Mar
Péndulo (T)	Undisclosed	Member of Los Hijos del Olimpo
Poseidón (R)	Undisclosed	Member of Los Reyes del Mar
Prometeo (R)	Undisclosed	Member of Los Dinohermanos
Retro (R)	Undisclosed	Portrays Amotlamini at the annual CMLL Día de Muertos events
Sangre Imperial (R)	Undisclosed	
Tenochca (R)	Undisclosed	(Probationary) Member of Los Depredadores
Troglodita (R)	Unknown	
Troyano (R)	Undisclosed	Member of Los Emperadores

=== Guadalajara Roster ===
Ring name	Real name	Notes
Abigor la Pesadilla (R)	Undisclosed	
Adrenalina (T)	Undisclosed	
Amon Ra (T)	Undisclosed	Member of Los Elegidos
Ángel del Bien (T)	Undisclosed	
Arlequín (R)	José Manuel Campos Órnelas	
Astro Oriental (T)	Undisclosed	
Avispón Negro Jr. (T)	Undisclosed	
Bestia Negra (R)	Undisclosed	Occidente Heavyweight Champion
Black Boy (T)	Carlos Dominguez Mercado	Member of Los Back Three Boys
Black Warrior Jr. (R)	Undisclosed	
Canalla (R)	Undisclosed	
Continental (?)	Edwin Armando Tinoco	Member of Los Elegidos
Cowboy (?)	Undisclosed	
Cris Skin (R)	Undisclosed	
Demonio Maya (?)	Undisclosed	
Dominia (R)	Undisclosed	Luchadora
Dulce Kitty (T)	Undisclosed	Luchadora
Eclipse Jr. (?)	Undisclosed	
Exterminador (R)	Unknown	
Fantástico (T)	Undisclosed	
Gran Kenut (R)	Undisclosed	Last seen December 2025
Draego (T)	Undisclosed	
Guerrero del la Muerte (R)	Unknown	Occidente Trios Champion
Halcón de Plata (T)	Undisclosed	
Infierno (R)	Undisclosed	Member of Compadres del Infierno
Ivanna (T)	Unknown	Luchadora
Kaiju (T)	Undisclosed	Member of Los Elegidos
Lady Danger (R)?	Undisclosed	Luchadora
Leo (R)	Unknown	
Lince del Bajio (T)	Undisclosed	
Magia Azul (T)	Undisclosed	Luchadora
Maléfico (R)	Unknown	Member of Compadres del Infierno
Minotauro (R)?	Undisclosed	Last seen April 2026
Miss Guerrera (R)	Undisclosed	Luchadora
Mr. Trueno (R)	Rodolfo Damián Oliveros	
Nautica (R)	Undisclosed	Luchadora
Nexy (?)	Undisclosed	Luchadora
Obek (?)	Undisclosed	Last seen March 2026
Omar Brunetti (R)	Omar Armando Soto Lizárraga	
Optimus (?)	Undisclosed	Member of Los Kamikaez del Ring
Persa (R)	Fernando Rafael Ibarra Ezquivel	
Ponzoña Jr. (R)	Undisclosed	
Principe Daniel (R)	Unknown	
Prince Drago (R)	Undisclosed	
Princesa Águila (T)?	Undisclosed	Luchadora
Rafaga (R)	Undisclosed	Occidente Trios Champion
Rafaga Jr. (T)	Undisclosed	Occidente Tag Team Champion
Rav (R)	Undisclosed	
Rey Trueno (R)	Gustavo Damián Oliveros	Last Seen September 2025
Shezmu (R)	Undisclosed	
Temerario (R)	Undisclosed	
Tezca (?)	Undisclosed	Luchadora
Thunder Boy (T)	Undisclosed	Member of Los Back Three Boys
Trono (?)	Undisclosed	Member of Los Kamikaez del Ring
Último Ángel (T)	Undisclosed	
Yaky Boy (T)	Unknown	Member of Los Back Three Boys

=== Puebla Roster ===
Ring name	Real name	Notes
Amnesia (T)	Undisclosed	
Astoreth (R)	Undisclosed	Luchadora
Astro (T)	Undisclosed	
Asturiano (T)	Undisclosed	
Blue Shark (T)	Unknown	
Centella Roja (T)	Undisclosed	
Diablita Roja (R)	Undisclosed	Luchadora; Member of Los Twins Infernales
Dreyko (?)	Undisclosed	
Espíritu Maligno (R)	Alejandro Perez Perez	last seen January 2026
El Hijo De Centella Roja (T)	Undisclosed	
El Hijo del Perverso (R)	Unknown	the current Peverso's brother, not son
Kheops (?)	Undisclosed	
King Jaguar (R)	Gustavo López	
Konjuro (R)	Undisclosed	
Lady Metal (T)?		Luchadora; Member of Los Twins Infernales
Makro (?)	Undisclosed	
El Malayo (T)	Jorge González Ruiz	Trainer (Puebla)
Meyer (T)	Undisclosed	Arena Puebla Tag Team Champion
Millenium (T)	Undisclosed	
Multy (R)	Undisclosed	
El Perverso (R)	Luis Moron	
Prayer (R)	Juan José Salazar Hernández	Arena Puebla Openweight Champion
Rencor (R)	Undisclosed	
Rey Apocalipsis (R)	Undisclosed	Arena Puebla Barroco Champion
Rey Espartano (R)	Undisclosed	Member of Los Emperadores
Sombra Diabólica (R)	Enrique Cuautle Lopez	
Sombra Diabólica Jr. (R)	Undisclosed	
The Tiger (T)	Jesús Juárez Hernández	Trainer (Puebla)
Tiger Boy (T)	Undisclosed	Arena Puebla Tag Team Champion
El Vigia (T)	Unknown	

== Mini-Estrellas ==
The insular division for shorter male wrestlers, totally divorced from the main men's roster. Graduation from one to the other is possible, but rare.

Ring name	Real name	Notes
Acero (T)	Undisclosed	
Aéreo (T)	Víctor Barragán Hernández	
Fantasy (T)	Undisclosed	
Full Metal (R)	Undisclosed	Member of Los Metales Explosivos
Galaxy (T)	Undisclosed	Member of El Pequeño Sky Team
Kaligua (T)	Luis Ángel Santiago Guzman	Member of El Pequeño Sky Team
Mercurio (R)	Abraham Arrieta González	Member of Los Pequeños Depredadores
Minos I (R)	Undisclosed	Member of Los Pequeños Depredadores
Minos II (R)	Undisclosed	Member of Los Pequeños Depredadores
Pequeño Magía (T)	Undisclosed	Member of El Pequeño Sky Team
Pequeño Olímpico (R)	Andrés Muñoz Andrade	
Pequeño Pólvora (R)	Undisclosed	Member of Los Metales Explosivos
Pequeño Violencia (R)	Unknown	
Pequeño Volador Jr. (R)	Undisclosed	CMLL World Mini-Estrella Champion; Member of Los Pequeños Depredadores
Pierrothito (R)	Undisclosed	
Rostro De Acero (R)	Undisclosed	Member of Los Metales Explosivos
Shockercito (T)	Javier Cortes Sánchez	
Último Dragoncito (T)	Miguel Ángel Arciniega Peña	Trainer

== Micro-Estrellas ==
Also known as mascotas. More often booked as seconds for teams on the main roster to do comedy between falls than as wrestlers in their own right.

Ring name	Real name	Notes
Atomo (T)	Undisclosed	
Chamuel (R)	José Francisco García Cruz	
KeMalito (R)	Undisclosed	CMLL World Micro-Estrellas Champion; Mascot of the overall rudo lockerroom Member of AEW's Death Riders
KeMonito (II) (T)	Undisclosed	Mascot of the overall técnico lockerroom
Tengu (R)	Undisclosed	Mascot of La Maquina de la Destruccion; Mascot of Las Bestias Del Diablo
Zacarías el Perico (R)	Undisclosed	Mascot of El Galeon Fantasma

== Other personnel ==
Name in bold = "inner circle" of CMLL's operation

Ring name	Notes
**Alexis Salazar**	Social Media Manager; Photographer; Commentary producer
Anna Gutiérrez	Commentator (Guadalajara)
**Armando Padilla**	Head of Production
Arturo Beristain	Trainer
Arturo Wenceslao	Commentator (Puebla)
Bestia Negra (I); Adolfo González	Referee
**Catalina Beltran**	Second-in-command; Office worker
La Comandante; Norma Martinez	Referee
Edgar Noriega “El Güero”	CMLL booking staff Head Referee
Fernando Jesús Torres	Commentator (Televisa)
Gala Lutteroth Kochen	Director of Cultural Relations; Public Representative
Grako; Omar Palacios	Referee; Doctor
Iván Salguero	Ring Announcer
Jorge Livan	Commentator
José Luis Feliciano	CMLL booking staff Costume Designer
Juan Carlos Castellanos	Commentator
Juan Manuel Mar; Panico	CMLL booking staff Agent; Head of Merchandising
**Julio Cesar Rivera**	Head of CMLL booking staff CMLL Media Director; Commentator; Host and Interviewer
Leonardo Riaño	Commentator (Televisa)
Luis Fernando Loza	Commentator (Guadalajara)
Mario el Rudo	Referee (Guadalajara)
Martín Navarro Vásquez	Commentator (Guadalajara)
Matías Lutteroth	Public Representative
Tigre Infante; Salvador Munguia	Referee
Mickey Lee	Commentator
Miguel Castro	CEO’s Senior Aide; Interpromotional Manager; Business Development Consultant; English-language Commentator
Miguel Linares	Commentator
Octavio Duarte	Commentator (Puebla)
Olímpico; Joel Galicia	Referee
Omar García "La Voz"	Ring Announcer
Roberto Lopez Olvera	Commentator
Salvador Lutteroth Camou	Executive Consultant
Salvador Lutteroth Lomeli	CEO/Director; Public Representative
Satanico; Daniel López	Trainer (Guadalajara)
Skándalo; Undisclosed	Head of Concessions; Merchandising staff
Tatiana Clasing	Commercial Representative, Public Affairs Consultant, Writer
Terror Chino; Felipe Jesus Hernandez	CMLL booking staff Former Referee
Thelma Barron; FKA Súper Estrella	Referee (Guadalajara)
Toño Murillo; Juan Antonio Murillo Medina	Commentator (Guadalajara)
Tony Salazar	Trainer
La Vaquerita; Isabel Ordóñez Martínez	Amazonas Referee

== See also ==
- Professional wrestling in Mexico
- List of professional wrestling rosters
