= Yutani =

Yutani (湯谷) [jɯ.ta.ɲi] is a Japanese surname. It literally means "hot spring valley".

== Places ==
- There are several hot springs named Yutani Onsen (湯谷温泉)

== Other ==
- Yutani Corporation, a Japanese pneumatic tool manufacturer established in 1918.
- Weyland-Yutani, a fictional megacorporation in the Alien films
  - Yutani Corporation (Aliens), a predecessor military arms corporation to Weyland-Yutani, see Aliens vs. Predator: Requiem
  - Ms. Yutani, a character in Aliens vs. Predator: Requiem, see List of Alien vs. Predator characters
  - Yutani, a character in Alien: Earth
- Yutani, an unlockable character in the mobile game Subway Surfers
- Yutani, the ring-name of a Japanese soccer player-turned-professional wrestler who works for Consejo Mundial de Lucha Libre

== See also ==
- Japanese name
