= Hijo de Stuka Jr. =

Mexican professional wrestler (born 2003)

Personal information
- Born: 2003 (age 22–23) Gómez Palacio, Durango, Mexico
- Family: Stuka Jr. (father); Stuka (uncle)

Professional wrestling career
- Ring name: Hijo de Stuka Jr.
- Billed height: 1.71 m (5 ft 7 in)
- Billed weight: 87 kg (192 lb)
- Billed from: Gómez Palacio, Durango
- Trained by: Stuka Jr. Último Dragoncito; Último Guerrero
- Debut: June 15, 2021

Hijo de Stuka Jr. (born 2003) is a Mexican professional wrestler signed to Consejo Mundial de Lucha Libre (CMLL). He is a member of the stable Los Herederos ("The Heirs"), and is one-third of the current Mexican National Trios Champions with stablemates El Cobarde and Felino Jr. in their first reign. He also makes appearances for partner promotion New Japan Pro-Wrestling (NJPW).

A second-generation wrestler, he is the son of Stuka Jr. (with whom he won the 2024 Copa Dinastías tournament) and the nephew of the original Stuka. His real name is not a matter of public record, as is often the case with masked wrestlers in Mexico, where their private lives are kept a secret from the fans.

== Professional wrestling career ==
=== Consejo Mundial de Lucha Libre (2021–present) ===
==== Teaming with Stuka Jr. (2021–2025) ====
Hijo de Stuka Jr. began attending a professional wrestling school at the age of 12, training in Gómez Palacio, Durango under his father, Último Dragoncito and Último Guerrero. On June 15, 2021, he made his debut for Consejo Mundial de Lucha Libre (CMLL), teaming with his father Stuka Jr. in a four-way tag team match involving Felino and Felino Jr., El Satánico and Furia Roja and winners Panterita del Ring and Panterita del Ring Jr. He spent the early part of his career wrestling on the independent circuit in northern Mexico.

He and his father entered the family-oriented Copa Dinastías ("Dynasties Cup") tournament on June 4, 2023, defeating Misterio Negro and Misterioso Jr. in the first round and Euforia and Soberano Jr. in the semi-finals, before losing to Dr. Karonte I and Místico in the finals two weeks later. They took part in the Torneo Gran Alternativa ("Great Alternative Tournament"), but lost to Brillante Jr. and Místico in the first round on January 19, 2024. On June 16, Hijo de Stuka Jr. and his father won that year's Copa Dinastías, lastly defeating Euforia and Soberano Jr. by disqualification after he was unmasked by Euforia. On February 22, 2025, Hijo de Stuka Jr. was the third wrestler eliminated by Valiente Jr. in a tournament for the Copa Herederos ("Heirs' Cup"), which primarily featured the sons of wrestlers.

==== Los Herederos (2025–present) ====
On June 16, Hijo de Stuka Jr. won his first professional wrestling championship, as he, El Cobarde and Felino Jr. defeated Viajeros del Espacio (Futuro, Hombre Bala Jr. and Max Star) for the Mexican National Trios Championship. They subsequently began teaming under the name Los Herederos ("The Heirs"), successfully defending the title against La Fuerza Poblana (Arkalis, Rayo Metálico and Stigma) at Noche de Campeones ("Night of Champions") on September 26. On February 3, 2026, Hijo de Stuka Jr. participated in the Reyes del Aire ("Kings of the Air") tournament, but was the fourth wrestler eliminated from the torneo cibernetico by Explosivo. For holding a championship, he was allowed to compete in the nine-way elimination semi-finals of the Universal Championship tournament on April 17, but was eliminated by Capitán Suicida. He was also the first wrestler eliminated by Soberano Jr. in the semi-final torneo cibernetico of the La Copa Junior VIP ("The Junior VIP Cup") tournament on May 22.

=== New Japan Pro-Wrestling (2026–present) ===
In February 2026, Hijo de Stuka Jr. made his debut for New Japan Pro-Wrestling (NJPW) as part of the Fantastica Mania 2026 tour, co-promoted by CMLL and NJPW. He and Shoma Kato participated in a tag team tournament, but were eliminated by Futuro and Valiente Jr. in the first round.

== Championships and accomplishments ==
Consejo Mundial de Lucha Libre

- Mexican National Trios Championship (1 time, current) – with El Cobarde and Felino Jr.
- Copa Dinastías (2024) – with Stuka Jr.

== Lucha de Apuestas record ==
Winner (wager)	Loser (wager)	Location	Event	Date	Notes
Hijo de Stuka Jr. (mask)	Gran Jefe VI (mask)	Gómez Palacio, Durango	Live show	December 14, 2023	
