= CMLL Reyes del Aire =

Professional wrestling tournament

Reyes del Aire
- Promotional poster for the 2011 edition
- Promotion: Consejo Mundial de Lucha Libre

Tournament information
- Established: 2005; 21 years ago
- Current winner: Raider
- Last completed: 2026 Puebla
- Editions: 25 (22 official)
- Format: Torneo cibernetico
Statistics
- First winner: Volador Jr.
- Most wins: 3 wins: Ángel de Oro; Volador Jr.
- Oldest winner: Mephisto (49 years, 1 day)
- Youngest winner: Cavernario (22 years, 329 days)
- Heaviest winner: La Sombra (104 kg (229 lb))
- Lightest winner: Virus (79 kg (174 lb))

Reyes del Aire (Spanish for "Kings of the Air") is an annual professional wrestling tournament produced by Mexican professional wrestling promotion Consejo Mundial de Lucha Libre (CMLL). Established in 2005, the event has been held annually except in 2010, 2018, and 2021. Two editions of the tournament took place in 2007, 2012, 2014, 2017, 2024, and 2026. As of March 2026, 18 different wrestlers have won the tournament out of 119 total competitors across 25 editions in the tournament's history; CMLL only officially recognizes 22 editions and 15 different tournament winners. The current winner is Raider, who won the 2026 Puebla edition, but this tournament is not officially recognized by CMLL.

Unlike the standard single-elimination tournament format, the Reyes del Aire tournament only consists of a single round and a single elimination match with a varying even number of competitors. The tournament typically features wrestlers whose style consists of high-flying aerial techniques. Its format is a torneo cibernetico, where the field of competitors is evenly split into two factions: técnicos and rudos. The last remaining competitor in the match is declared the winner of the tournament and named the Rey del Aire. The winner of the tournament also receives a trophy.

CMLL holds a similar tournament for their Mini-Estrella division called Pequeños Reyes del Aire (Spanish for "Little Kings of the Air").

== Format ==
Unlike the standard single-elimination tournament format, the Reyes del Aire tournament only consists of a single round and a single elimination match with a varying even number of competitors. The tournament format is a torneo cibernetico, a multi-man elimination match where two teams face off against each other. It uses standard lucha libre tag team rules with elimination occurring with a pinfall, submission, disqualification, and countout and allows a wrestler to enter the match when their tag team partner exits the ring as well as when they tag out. A batting order system is occasionally used to impose a strict order of entry for every competitor. If two or more competitors from the same team remain, they must face each other to determine a sole winner.

The tournament typically features wrestlers whose style consists of high-flying aerial techniques. The field of competitors is evenly split between técnicos and rudos. Despite the tournament not being a standard tag team match, competitors mainly work as a faction depending on whether they are a técnico or a rudo. The last remaining competitor in the match is declared the winner of the tournament and named the Rey del Aire. The winner of the tournament also receives a trophy.

== List of Reyes del Aire winners ==
As of March 2026, there have been 25 tournaments with 18 different winners. Although, only 22 tournaments and 15 different winners are officially recognized by Consejo Mundial de Lucha Libre. Volador Jr. is the inaugural tournament winner, winning it in 2005. Five wrestlers have won the tournament more than once; Ángel de Oro and Volador Jr. won the title three times, while La Sombra, Stuka Jr., and Valiente won it twice. de Oro is the only wrestler to win consecutive tournaments, having won in 2011 and 2012. Mephisto is the oldest winner at 49 years old, winning the 2017 VIP Puebla edition. Cavernario is the youngest winner at 22 years old, winning the 2016 tournament.

The tournament edition is not officially recognized by Consejo Mundial de Lucha Libre.

List of Reyes del Aire winners
#	Year	Version	Winner	No. of wins	Date	Venue	Location	Ref.
1	2005	—N/a	Volador Jr.	1	June 10, 2005	Arena México	Mexico City, Mexico	
2	2006	—N/a	La Máscara	1	June 18, 2006	Arena México	Mexico City, Mexico	
3	2007	Arena México	Volador Jr.	2	February 16, 2007	Arena México	Mexico City, Mexico	
4	2007	Arena Coliseo	Virus	1	October 2, 2007	Arena Coliseo	Mexico City, Mexico	
5	2008	—N/a	Valiente	1	May 9, 2008	Arena México	Mexico City, Mexico	
6	2009	—N/a	Volador Jr.	3	October 12, 2009	Arena Puebla	Puebla, Puebla, Mexico	
7	2011	—N/a	Ángel de Oro	1	January 1, 2011	Arena México	Mexico City, Mexico	
8	2012	Mexico City	Ángel de Oro	2	February 3, 2012	Arena México	Mexico City, Mexico	
9	2012	Puebla	Valiente	2	October 15, 2012	Arena Puebla	Puebla, Puebla, Mexico	
10	2013	—N/a	La Sombra	1	February 15, 2013	Arena México	Mexico City, Mexico	
11	2014	Standard	Stuka Jr.	1	April 27, 2014	Arena México	Mexico City, Mexico	
12	2014	Puebla	Rey Escorpión	1	August 4, 2014	Arena Puebla	Puebla, Puebla, Mexico	
13	2015	—N/a	La Sombra	2	May 1, 2015	Arena México	Mexico City, Mexico	
14	2016	—N/a	Cavernario	1	September 30, 2016	Arena México	Mexico City, Mexico	
15	2017	Standard	Ángel de Oro	3	April 7, 2017	Arena México	Mexico City, Mexico	
—	2017	VIP (Puebla)	Mephisto	1	December 11, 2017	Arena Puebla	Puebla, Puebla, Mexico	
16	2019	—N/a	Titán	1	January 6, 2019	Arena México	Mexico City, Mexico	
17	2020	—N/a	Templario	1	January 14, 2020	Arena México	Mexico City, Mexico	
18	2022	VIP	Stuka Jr.	2	January 28, 2022	Arena México	Mexico City, Mexico	
19	2023	VIP	Dragón Rojo Jr.	1	January 27, 2023	Arena México	Mexico City, Mexico	
20	2024	Standard	Místico	1	February 6, 2024	Arena México	Mexico City, Mexico	
—	2024	Puebla	Arkalis	1	April 8, 2024	Arena Puebla	Puebla, Puebla, Mexico	
21	2025	—N/a	Neón	1	February 4, 2025	Arena México	Mexico City, Mexico	
22	2026	Standard	Flip Gordon	1	February 3, 2026	Arena México	Mexico City, Mexico	
—	2026	Puebla	Raider	1	March 9, 2026	Arena Puebla	Puebla, Puebla, Mexico	

== Tournament history ==
=== 2000s ===
==== 2005 ====
Reyes del Aire (2005)
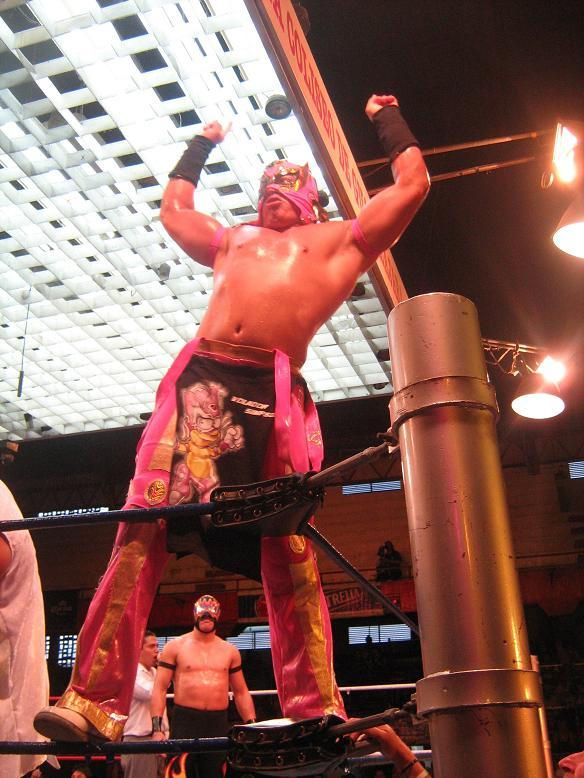
- Inaugural winner Volador Jr.
- Promotion: Consejo Mundial de Lucha Libre
- Date: June 10, 2005
- City: Mexico City, D.F., Mexico
- Venue: Arena México

Event chronology
← Previous; 49. Aniversario de Arena México	Next → Torneo Gran Alternativa

Reyes del Aire chronology
← Previous; First	Next → 2006

The inaugural Reyes del Aire (Spanish for "Kings of the Air") was a professional wrestling tournament produced by Mexican professional wrestling promotion Consejo Mundial de Lucha Libre. It took place on Friday, June 10, 2005, on Super Viernes at Arena México in Mexico City, D.F., Mexico. Ten competitors competed in a torneo cibernetico, a multi-man elimination match. The competitors of the inaugural tournament were Alan Stone, La Máscara, Leono, Misterioso Jr., Ricky Marvin, Stuka Jr., Tigre Blanco, Tigre Metálico, Virus, and Volador Jr.

The winner of the tournament and inaugural Rey de Aire was Volador Jr., who last eliminated Ricky Marvin.

Order of elimination
Order	Wrestler	Eliminated by	Elimination(s)
1	Leono	Tigre Metálico	0
2	Stuka Jr.	Tigre Blanco	0
3	Tigre Metálico	Misterioso Jr.	1
4	Tigre Blanco	Alan Stone	1
5	Alan Stone	Virus	2
5	Virus	Alan Stone	1
7	La Máscara	Misterioso Jr.	0
8	Misterioso Jr.	Volador Jr.	2
9	Ricky Marvin	Volador Jr.	0
—	Volador Jr.	Winner	2

==== 2006 ====
Reyes del Aire (2006)
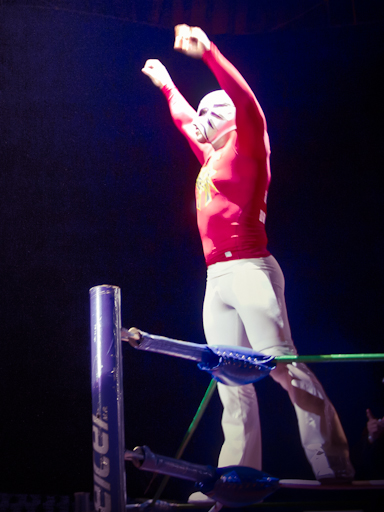
- 2006 Rey del Aire La Mascara
- Promotion: Consejo Mundial de Lucha Libre
- Date: June 18, 2006
- City: Mexico City, D.F., Mexico
- Venue: Arena México

Event chronology
← Previous; Torneo Gran Alternativa	Next → Leyenda de Plata

Reyes del Aire chronology
← Previous; 2005	Next → 2007 Arena México

The 2006 Reyes del Aire was a professional wrestling tournament produced by the Mexican professional wrestling promotion Consejo Mundial de Lucha Libre. The tournament took place on Sunday, June 18, 2006, on Domingos de Coliseo at Arena México in Mexico City, D.F., Mexico. It was the second Reyes del Aire since it was established the previous year in 2005. Ten competitors competed in a torneo cibernetico, a multi-man elimination match. The competitors of the tournament were Danger, La Máscara, Leono, Loco Max, Máscara Purpura, Neutron, Oro II, Stuka Jr., Tony Rivera, and Valiente. The defending winner Volador Jr. did not compete in the tournament.

The winner of the tournament was La Máscara, who last eliminated Neutron.

Order of elimination
Order	Wrestler	Eliminated by	Elimination(s)	Time
1	Valiente	Leono	0	8:42
2	Danger	Tony Rivera	0	9:56
3	Loco Max	Oro II	0	11:34
4	Leono	Stuka Jr.	1	11:58
5	Oro II	Neutron	1	12:41
6	Tony Rivera	Máscara Purpura	1	15:10
7	Máscara Purpura	Stuka Jr.	2	16:35
7	Stuka Jr.	Máscara Purpura	2	16:35
9	Neutron	La Máscara	1	18:09
—	La Máscara	Winner	1	18:09

==== 2007 Arena México ====
Reyes del Aire (2007 Arena México)
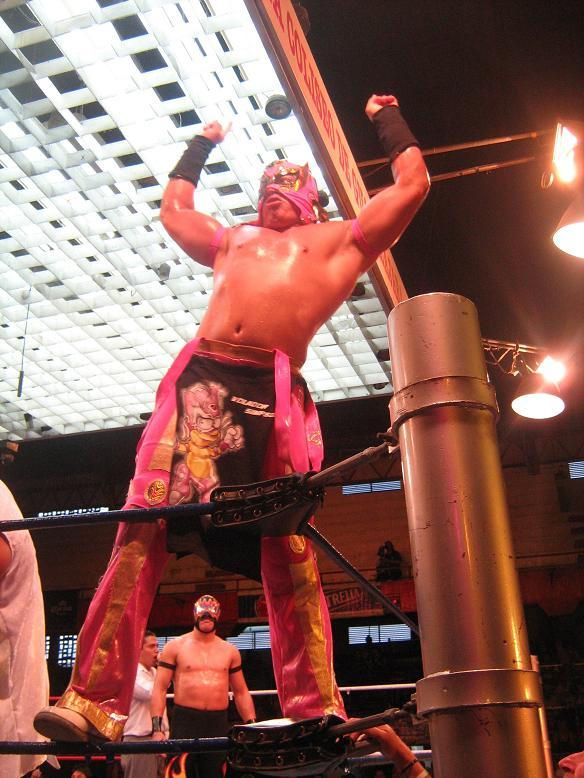
- Two-time and 2007 Rey del Aire Arena México Volador Jr.
- Promotion: Consejo Mundial de Lucha Libre
- Date: February 16, 2007
- City: Mexico City, D.F., Mexico
- Venue: Arena México

Event chronology
← Previous; Sin Piedad	Next → Homenaje a Dos Leyendas

Reyes del Aire chronology
← Previous; 2006	Next → 2007 Arena Coliseo

The 2007 Reyes del Aire Arena México (Spanish for "Kings of the Air Arena México") was a professional wrestling tournament produced by the Mexican professional wrestling promotion Consejo Mundial de Lucha Libre. The tournament took place on Friday, February 16, 2007, on Super Viernes at Arena México in Mexico City, D.F., Mexico. It was the third Reyes del Aire since 2005. Sixteen competitors competed in a torneo cibernetico, a multi-man elimination match. The competitors of the tournament were defending winner La Máscara, Alex Koslov, Averno, El Felino, El Sagrado, Leono, Mephisto, Metro, Misterioso Jr., Sangre Azteca, Sombra de Plata, Stuka Jr., Súper Nova, Valiente, and Virus.

Defending winner La Máscara was eliminated 10th by Sangre Azteca. The winner of the tournament was Volador Jr., who last eliminated Sangre Azteca. Volador Jr. became the first two-time Reyes del Aire winner; he previously won the inaugural tournament in 2005.

Order of elimination
Order	Wrestler	Eliminated by	Elimination(s)
1	Sombra de Plata	Súper Nova	0
2	Súper Nova	Valiente	1
3	Valiente	Metro	1
4	Stuka Jr.	Leono	0
5	Metro	Virus	1
6	Leono	Alex Koslov	1
7	Misterioso Jr.	El Sagrado	0
8	Virus	Averno	1
9	Alex Koslov	El Felino	2
9	El Felino	Alex Koslov	1
11	El Sagrado	La Máscara	2
12	Averno	Volador Jr.	1
13	Mephisto	La Máscara	0
14	La Máscara	Sangre Azteca	2
15	Sangre Azteca	Volador Jr.	1
—	Volador Jr.	Winner	1

==== 2007 Arena Coliseo ====
Reyes del Aire (2007 Arena Coliseo)
- Promotion: Consejo Mundial de Lucha Libre
- Date: October 2, 2007
- City: Mexico City, D.F., Mexico
- Venue: Arena Coliseo

Event chronology
← Previous; CMLL 74th Anniversary Show	Next → Sin Piedad

Reyes del Aire chronology
← Previous; 2007 Arena Mexico	Next → 2008

The 2007 Reyes del Aire Arena Coliseo (Spanish for "Kings of the Air Arena Coliseo") was a professional wrestling tournament produced by the Mexican professional wrestling promotion Consejo Mundial de Lucha Libre (CMLL). The tournament took place on Tuesday, October 2, 2007, on Martes de Coliseo at Arena Coliseo in Mexico City, D.F., Mexico. It was the fourth Reyes del Aire since 2005 and the second edition of the year; CMLL broke the tournament's annual tradition. Twelve competitors competed in a torneo cibernetico, a multi-man elimination match. The competitors of the tournament were Ángel Azteca Jr., Astro Boy, Euforia, Loco Max, Metálico, Nosferatu, Skándalo, Stuka Jr., Súper Nova, Trueno, Valiente, and Virus. Defending winner Volador Jr. did not compete in the tournament. Most of the eliminations and the order of eliminations are undocumented.

Virus was the winner of the tournament.

==== 2008 ====
Reyes del Aire (2008)
- Promotion: Consejo Mundial de Lucha Libre
- Date: May 9, 2008
- City: Mexico City, D.F., Mexico
- Venue: Arena México

Event chronology
← Previous; 52. Aniversario de Arena México	Next → Infierno en el Ring

Reyes del Aire chronology
← Previous; 2007 Arena Coliseo	Next → 2009

The 2008 Reyes del Aire (Spanish for "Kings of the Air") was a professional wrestling tournament produced by the Mexican professional wrestling promotion Consejo Mundial de Lucha Libre. The tournament took place on Friday, May 9, 2008, on Super Viernes at Arena México in Mexico City, D.F., Mexico. It was the fifth Reyes del Aire since 2005. Sixteen competitors competed in a torneo cibernetico, a multi-man elimination match. The competitors of the tournament were defending winner Virus, Diamante Negro, El Sagrado, Ephesto, Euforia, Flash, La Máscara, La Sombra, Loco Max, Máscara Purpura, Misterioso Jr., Mr. Águila, Sangre Azteca, Stuka Jr., Valiente, and Volador Jr.

Defending winner Virus was eliminated fourth by La Máscara. The winner of the tournament was Valiente, who last eliminated Sangre Azteca.

Order of elimination
Order	Wrestler	Eliminated by	Elimination(s)	Time
1	Loco Max	Mascara Purpura	0	15:21
2	Flash	Virus	0	15:32
3	Stuka Jr.	Euforia	0	17:15
4	Virus	La Máscara	1	20:08
5	Diamante Negro	El Sagrado	0	21:17
6	Máscara Purpura	Ephesto	1	23:05
7	Euforia	La Sombra	1	25:37
8	Ephesto	Volador Jr.	1	26:43
9	El Sagrado	Misterioso Jr.	1	26:43
10	Mr. Águila	Volador Jr.	1	29:45
10	Volador Jr.	Mr. Águila	2	29:45
12	La Máscara	Sangre Azteca	1	31:10
13	Misterioso Jr.	Valiente	1	32:09
14	La Sombra	Sangre Azteca	1	33:25
15	Sangre Azteca	Valiente	2	34:22
—	Valiente	Winner	2	34:22

==== 2009 ====
Reyes del Aire (2009)
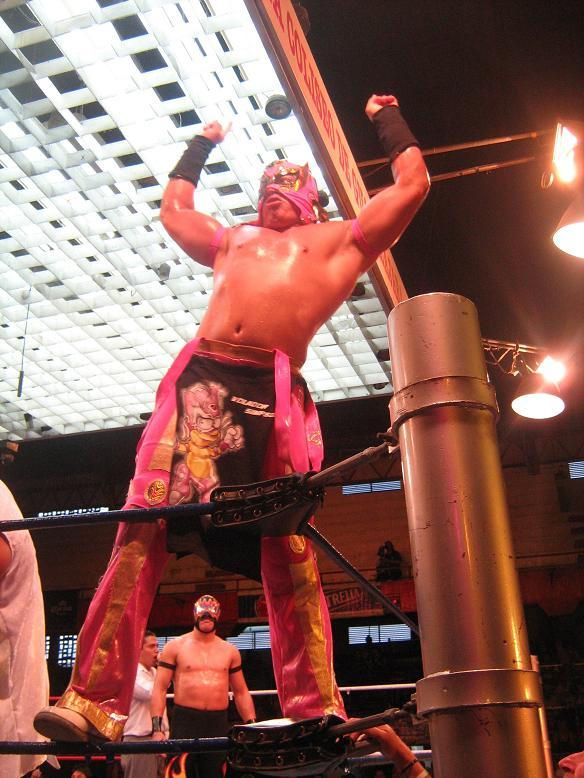
- Three-time and 2009 Rey del Aire Volador Jr.
- Promotion: Consejo Mundial de Lucha Libre
- Date: October 12, 2009
- City: Puebla, Puebla, Mexico
- Venue: Arena Puebla

Event chronology
← Previous; Torneo Gran Alternativa	Next → Sin Salida

Reyes del Aire chronology
← Previous; 2008	Next → 2011

The 2009 Reyes del Aire (Spanish for "Kings of the Air") was a professional wrestling tournament produced by the Mexican professional wrestling promotion Consejo Mundial de Lucha Libre. The tournament took place on Monday, October 12, 2009, on Lunes Arena Puebla at Arena Puebla in Puebla, Puebla, Mexico. It was the sixth Reyes del Aire since 2005. Twelve competitors competed in a torneo cibernetico, a multi-man elimination match. The competitors of the tournament were defending winner Valiente, Averno, Black Warrior, El Sagrado, El Texano Jr., Ephesto, Flash, La Máscara, Máscara Dorada, Mephisto, Sangre Azteca, and Volador Jr.

Defending winner Valiente was eliminated seventh by El Texano Jr. The winner of the tournament was Volador Jr., who last eliminated Mephisto. Volador Jr. became the first three-time Reyes del Aire winner; he previously won the tournament in 2005 and 2007 Arena México.

Order of elimination
Order	Wrestler	Eliminated by	Elimination(s)
1	Flash	Sangre Azteca	0
2	Máscara Dorada	Sangre Azteca	1
2	Sangre Azteca	Máscara Dorada	2
4	Ephesto	Valiente	0
5	El Sagrado	Black Warrior	0
6	Black Warrior	La Máscara	1
7	Valiente	El Texano Jr.	1
8	El Texano Jr.	La Máscara	1
9	La Máscara	Averno	2
10	Averno	Volador Jr.	1
11	Mephisto	Volador Jr.	0
—	Volador Jr.	Winner	2

=== 2010s ===
==== 2011 ====
Reyes del Aire (2011)
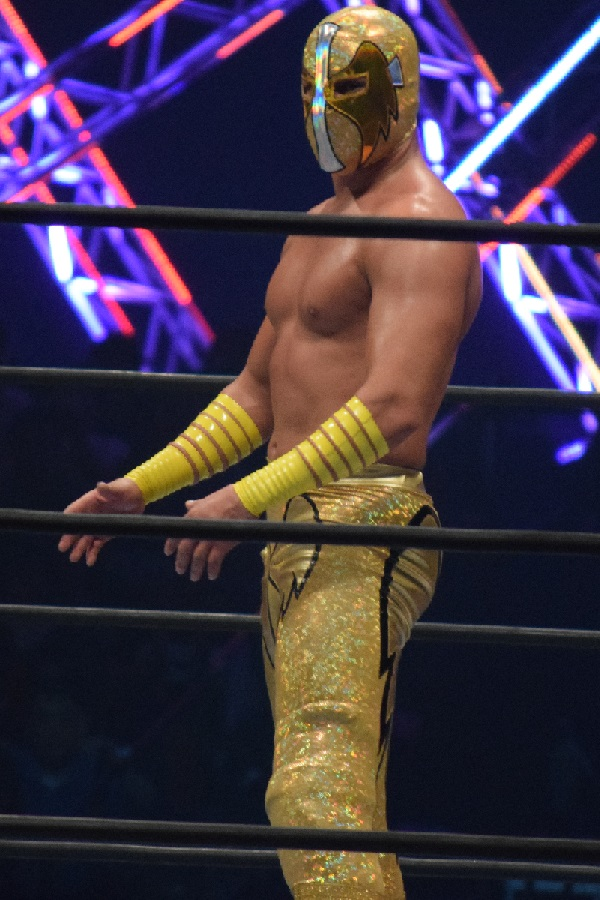
- 2011 Rey del Aire Ángel de Oro
- Promotion: Consejo Mundial de Lucha Libre
- Date: January 1, 2011
- City: Mexico City, D.F., Mexico
- Venue: Arena México

Event chronology
← Previous; La Copa Junior	Next → Fantasica Mania

Reyes del Aire chronology
← Previous; 2009	Next → 2012 Mexico City

The 2011 Reyes del Aire (Spanish for "Kings of the Air") was a professional wrestling tournament produced by the Mexican professional wrestling promotion Consejo Mundial de Lucha Libre. The tournament took place on Saturday, January 1, 2011, on Sabados Arena Mexico at Arena México in Mexico City, D.F., Mexico. It was the seventh Reyes del Aire since 2005, and it marked the return of the tournament after no edition was held the previous year in 2010. Sixteen competitors competed in a torneo cibernetico, a multi-man elimination match. The competitors of the tournament were Ángel de Plata, Arkangel de la Muerte, Cancerbero, Delta, Diamante, Escorpión, Fuego, Molotov, Pólvora, Puma King, Raziel, Rey Cometa, Sensei, Tiger Kid, and Virus. Defending winner Volador Jr. did not compete in the tournament. Guerrero Maya Jr. was originally slated to participate, but had to be replaced due to Hepatitis A, while Pegasso had to be replaced as he was unable to compete. Molotov and Sensei were selected as their replacements.

The winner of the tournament was Ángel de Oro, who last eliminated 2007 Arena Coliseo Reyes del Aire winner Virus.

Order of elimination
Order	Wrestler	Eliminated by	Elimination(s)
1	Tiger Kid	Molotov	0
2	Sensei	Puma King	0
3	Escorpión	Rey Cometa	0
4	Molotov	Arkangel de la Muerte	1
5	Puma King	Ángel de Plata	1
6	Rey Cometa	Cancerbero	1
7	Raziel	Fuego	0
8	Fuego	Unknown	1
9	Ángel de Plata	Arkangel de la Muerte	2
9	Arkangel de la Muerte	Ángel de Plata	2
11	Cancerbero	Delta	1
12	Diamante	Virus	0
13	Pólvora	Delta	0
14	Delta	Virus	2
15	Virus	Ángel de Oro	2
—	Ángel de Oro	Winner	1

==== 2012 Mexico City ====
Reyes del Aire (2012 Mexico City)
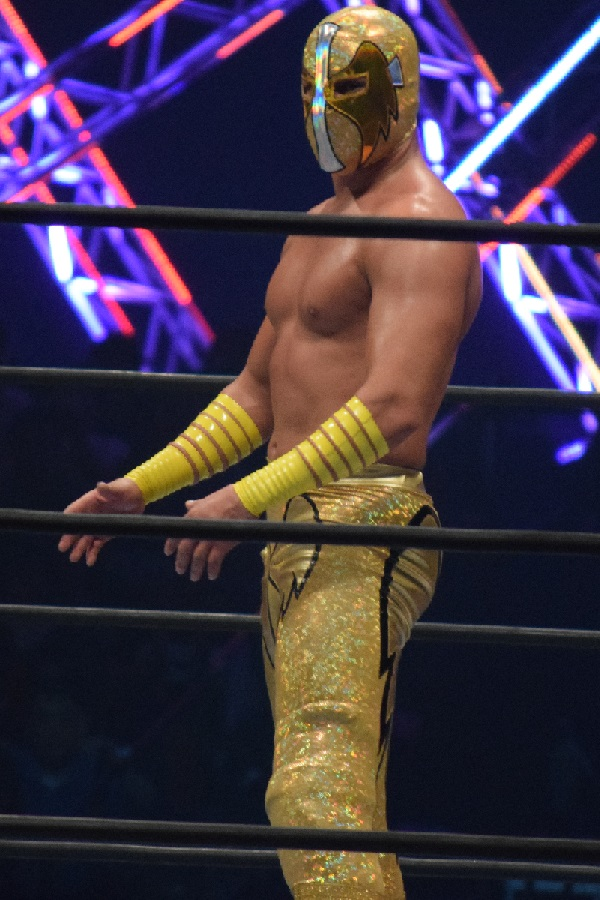
- Back-to-back Reyes del Aire winner Ángel de Oro
- Promotion: Consejo Mundial de Lucha Libre
- Date: February 3, 2012
- City: Mexico City, D.F., Mexico
- Venue: Arena México

Event chronology
← Previous; Fantastica Mania	Next → Torneo de Parejas Increíbles

Reyes del Aire chronology
← Previous; 2011	Next → 2012 Puebla

The 2012 Reyes del Aire Mexico City (Spanish for "Kings of the Air") was a professional wrestling tournament produced by the Mexican professional wrestling promotion Consejo Mundial de Lucha Libre. The tournament took place on Friday, February 3, 2012, on Super Viernes at Arena México in Mexico City, D.F., Mexico. It was the eighth Reyes del Aire since 2005. Eighteen competitors competed in a torneo cibernetico, a multi-man elimination match. The competitors of the tournament were defending winner Ángel de Oro, Delta, Euforia, Fuego, Guerrero Maya Jr., Hijo del Signo, Máscara Dorada, Mr. Águila, Pólvora, Puma King, Raziel, Rey Cometa, Rey Escorpión, Stuka Jr., Tiger, Titán, Valiente, Virus.

The winner of the tournament was defending winner Ángel de Oro, who last eliminated Mr. Águila. He became the first to win consecutive editions of the Reyes del Aire tournament.

Order of elimination
Order	Wrestler	Eliminated by
1	Rey Cometa	Unknown
2	Puma King	Unknown
3	Raziel	Unknown
4	Titán	Unknown
5	Hijo del Signo	Unknown
6	Fuego	Unknown
7	Euforia	Unknown
8	Guerrero Maya Jr.	Unknown
9	Tiger	Unknown
10	Pólvora	Stuka Jr.
10	Stuka Jr.	Pólvora
12	Delta	Unknown
13	Virus	Unknown
14	Valiente	Unknown
15	Rey Escorpión	Unknown
16	Máscara Dorada	Mr. Águila
17	Mr. Águila	Ángel de Oro
—	Ángel de Oro	Winner

==== 2012 Puebla ====
Reyes del Aire (2012 Puebla)
- Promotion: Consejo Mundial de Lucha Libre
- Date: October 15, 2012
- City: Puebla, Puebla, Mexico
- Venue: Arena Puebla

Event chronology
← Previous; Leyenda de Azul	Next → Pequeños Reyes del Aire

Reyes del Aire chronology
← Previous; 2012 Mexico City	Next → 2013

The 2012 Reyes del Aire Puebla (Spanish for "Kings of the Air Puebla") was a professional wrestling tournament produced by the Mexican professional wrestling promotion Consejo Mundial de Lucha Libre. The tournament took place on Monday, October 15, 2012, on Lunes Arena Puebla at Arena Puebla in Puebla, Puebla, Mexico. It was the ninth Reyes del Aire since 2005 and the second edition of the year. Twelve competitors competed in a torneo cibernetico, a multi-man elimination match. The competitors of the tournament were two-time defending winner Ángel de Oro, Averno, Dragón Rojo Jr., Euforia, La Mascara, Máscara Dorada, Mephisto, Mistico, Niebla Roja, Rey Escorpión, Titán, and Valiente.

Two-time defending winner Ángel de Oro was eliminated third by Averno and Rey Escorpión. The winner of the tournament was Valiente, who last eliminated Dragón Rojo Jr. This was Valiente's second tournament victory after winning in 2008.

Order of elimination
Order	Wrestler	Eliminated by	Elimination(s)
1	Niebla Roja	Místico	0
2	Titán	Rey Escorpión	0
3	Ángel de Oro	Averno and Rey Escorpión	0
4	Rey Escorpión	Máscara Dorada	2
5	Euforia	La Mascara	0
6	Mistico	Mephisto	1
7	Averno	Valiente	1
8	Máscara Dorada	Dragón Rojo Jr.	1
9	La Mascara	Mephisto	2
9	Mephisto	La Mascara	2
11	Dragón Rojo Jr.	Valiente	1
—	Valiente	Winner	2

==== 2013 ====
Reyes del Aire (2013)
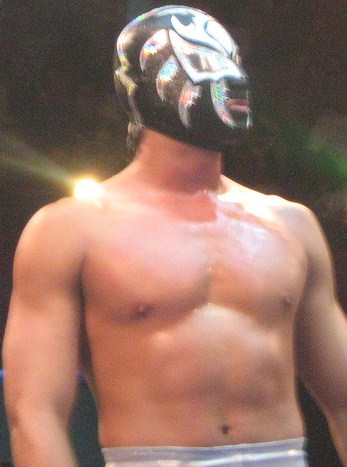
- 2013 Rey del Aire La Sombra
- Promotion: Consejo Mundial de Lucha Libre
- Date: February 1–15, 2013
- City: Mexico City, D.F., Mexico
- Venue: Arena México

Event chronology
← Previous; Fantastica Mania	Next → Torneo de Parejas Increíbles

Reyes del Aire chronology
← Previous; 2012 Puebla	Next → 2014 Mexico City

The 2013 Reyes del Aire (Spanish for "Kings of the Air") was a professional wrestling single-elimination tournament produced by the Mexican professional wrestling promotion Consejo Mundial de Lucha Libre. The tournament took place every Saturday from February 1 to 15, 2013, on Super Viernes at Arena México in Mexico City, D.F., Mexico. It was the 10th Reyes del Aire since 2005, the first edition to be held across multiple nights, and the first edition to consist of two rounds: the group stage and the tournament final. Thirty-two competitors were split into two groups. Each group competed in a torneo cibernetico, a multi-man elimination match, with the winner of each group advancing to the tournament final, where they competed in a two-out-of-three falls match.

Defending winner Valiente of Group B was eliminated ninth by Volador Jr. in the group stage. The winner of Group A was La Sombra, while the winner of Group B was former three-time Reyes del Aire winner Volador Jr. In the tournament final, Sombra defeated Volador Jr. 2–1 to become the 2013 Rey del Aire.

Order of elimination
Group A (Night 1: February 1)
#	Wrestler	Elim. by	Elim	Time
1	El Sagrado	Tiger	0	7:15
2	Stuka Jr.	Namajague	0	10:20
3	Tiger	Titán	1	11:44
4	Namajague	Rey Cometa	1	13:00
5	El Hijo del Fantasma	Pólvora	0	13:58
6	El Felino	La Máscara	0	14:29
7	Rey Cometa	Euforia	1	15:40
8	Delta	Dragón Rojo Jr.	0	17:00
9	Mr. Águila	La Sombra	0	20:28
10	Pólvora	Titán	1	24:16
11	Euforia	La Máscara	0	25:44
12	Titán	Averno	2	27:00
13 (Note: Dragón Rojo Jr. and La Máscara caused each other to get disqualified at the same time.)	Dragón Rojo Jr.	La Máscara	2	30:44
13	La Máscara	Dragón Rojo Jr.	3	30:44
15	Averno	La Sombra	1	37:12
—	La Sombra	Finalist	2	37:12

Order of elimination
Group B (Night 2: February 8)
#	Wrestler	Elim. by	Elim	Time
1	Sangre Azteca	Valiente	0	11:20
2	Virus	Guerrero Maya Jr.	0	12:38
3	Ángel de Oro	Rey Escorpión	0	14:26
4	Mephisto	via knockout	0	16:54
5	Puma	Máximo	0	17:38
6	Tritón	Niebla Roja	0	18:26
7	Diamante	Niebla Roja	0	19:08
8	Fuego	Psicosis	0	20:01
9	Valiente	Volador Jr.	1	21:08
10	Psicosis	Máscara Dorada	1	22:09
11	Niebla Roja	Máximo	2	23:22
12	Máximo	Volador Jr.	2	24:08
13	Rey Escorpión	Máscara Dorada	1	25:19
14	Guerrero Maya Jr.	Volador Jr.	1	26:37
15	Máscara Dorada	Volador Jr.	2	28:50
—	Volador Jr.	Finalist	4	28:50

Night 3 (February 15)
No.	Results	Stipulations
1	La Sombra (with La Máscara) defeated Volador Jr. (with Mephisto and Mije) 2–1	Two-out-of-three falls Reyes del Aire tournament final

==== 2014 ====
Reyes del Aire (2014 Mexico City)
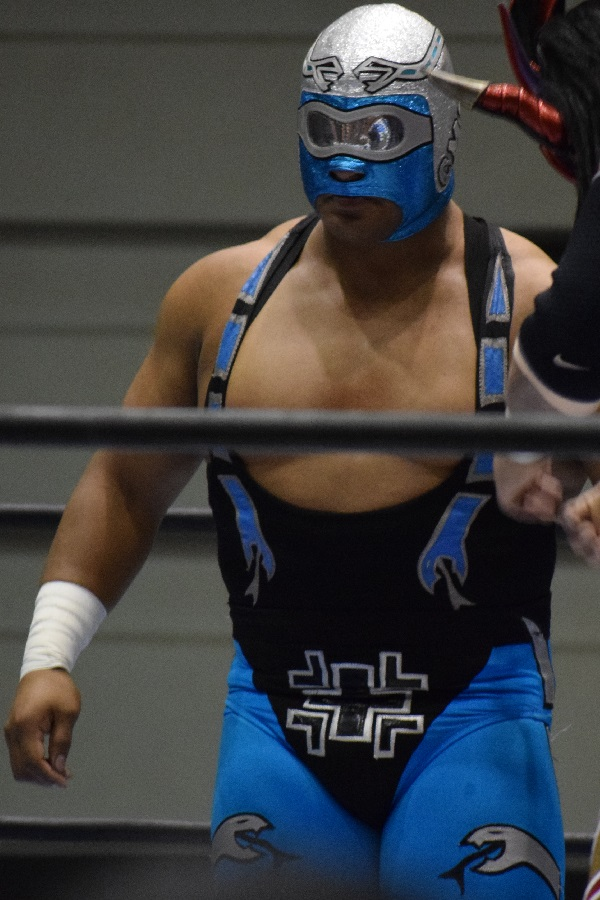
- 2014 Rey del Aire Stuka Jr.
- Promotion: Consejo Mundial de Lucha Libre
- Date: April 27, 2014
- City: Mexico City, D.F., Mexico
- Venue: Arena México

Event chronology
← Previous; En Busca de un Ídolo	Next →: 58. Aniversario de Arena México

Reyes del Aire chronology
← Previous; 2013	Next → 2014 Puebla

The 2014 Reyes del Aire (Spanish for "Kings of the Air") was a professional wrestling tournament produced by the Mexican professional wrestling promotion Consejo Mundial de Lucha Libre. The tournament took place on 58. Aniversario de Arena México (Spanish for "Arena México 58th Anniversary") on Sunday, April 27, 2014, at Arena México in Mexico City, D.F., Mexico. It was the 11th Reyes del Aire since 2005. Twelve competitors competed in a torneo cibernetico, a multi-man elimination match. The competitors of the tournament were Averno, Delta, Ephesto, Guerrero Maya Jr., Mephisto, Niebla Roja, Puma, Rey Cometa, Stuka Jr., Tiger, Tritón, and Valiente. Defending winner La Sombra did not compete in the tournament.

The winner of the tournament was Stuka Jr., who last eliminated Mephisto.

Order of elimination
Order	Wrestler	Eliminated by	Elimination(s)	Time
1	Tritón	Tiger	0	7:15
2	Ephesto	Guerrero Maya Jr.	0	7:53
3	Guerrero Maya Jr.	Niebla Roja	1	10:28
4	Rey Cometa	Puma	0	11:31
5	Tiger	Delta	1	12:23
6	Puma	Valiente	1	13:51
7	Delta	Averno	1	15:37
8	Niebla Roja	Stuka Jr.	1	17:00
9	Valiente	Averno and Mephisto	1	19:26
10	Averno	Stuka Jr.	2	20:51
11	Mephisto	Stuka Jr.	1	27:08
—	Stuka Jr.	Winner	3	27:08

==== 2014 Puebla ====
Reyes del Aire (2014 Puebla)
- Promotion: Consejo Mundial de Lucha Libre
- Date: August 4, 2014
- City: Puebla, Puebla, Mexico
- Venue: Arena Puebla

Event chronology
← Previous; Juicio Final	Next → Universal Championship

Reyes del Aire chronology
← Previous; 2014 Mexico City	Next → 2015

The 2014 Reyes del Aire Puebla (Spanish for "Kings of the Air Puebla") was a professional wrestling tournament produced by the Mexican professional wrestling promotion Consejo Mundial de Lucha Libre. The tournament took place on Monday, August 4, 2014, on Lunes Arena Puebla at Arena Puebla in Puebla, Puebla, Mexico. It was the 12th Reyes del Aire since 2005 and the second edition of the year. Ten competitors competed in a torneo cibernetico, a multi-man elimination match. The tournament featured técnico wrestlers defending winner Stuka Jr., Ángel de Oro, Dragón Rojo Jr., Máscara Dorada, and Stigma, as well as rudo wrestlers Gran Guerrero, Misterioso Jr., Puma, Rey Escorpión, and Ripper.

Defending winner Stuka Jr. was eliminated third by Gran Guerrero. The winner of the tournament was Rey Escorpión, who last eliminated Máscara Dorada.

Order of elimination
Order	Wrestler	Eliminated by	Elimination(s)	Time
1	Puma	Stuka Jr.	0	6:58
2	Stigma	Misterioso Jr.	0	10:25
3	Stuka Jr.	Gran Guerrero	1	12:30
4	Ángel de Oro	Ripper	0	13:25
5	Misterioso Jr.	Dragón Rojo Jr.	1	14:05
6	Gran Guerrero	Máscara Dorada	1	15:25
7	Dragón Rojo Jr.	via double disqualification	1	17:32
7	Ripper	via double disqualification	1	17:32
9	Máscara Dorada	Rey Escorpión	1	20:15
—	Rey Escorpión	Winner	1	20:15

==== 2015 ====
Reyes del Aire (2015)
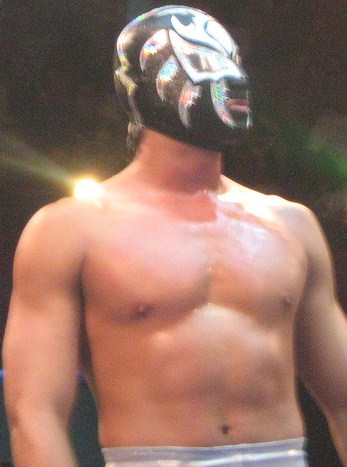
- Two-time and 2015 Reyes del Aire winner La Sombra
- Promotion: Consejo Mundial de Lucha Libre
- Date: May 1, 2015
- City: Mexico City, D.F., Mexico
- Venue: Arena México

Event chronology
← Previous; 59. Aniversario de Arena México	Next → Leyenda de Plata

Reyes del Aire chronology
← Previous; 2014 Puebla	Next → 2016

The 2015 Reyes del Aire (Spanish for "Kings of the Air") was a professional wrestling tournament produced by the Mexican professional wrestling promotion Consejo Mundial de Lucha Libre. The tournament took place on Friday, May 1, 2015, on Super Viernes at Arena México in Mexico City, D.F., Mexico. It was the 13th Reyes del Aire since 2005. Sixteen competitors competed in a torneo cibernetico, a multi-man elimination match. The competitors of the tournament were Ángel de Oro, Bárbaro Cavernario, Delta, Dragon Lee, Fuego, Gran Guerrero, Guerrero Maya Jr., Kamaitachi, La Sombra, Misterioso Jr., Niebla Roja, Puma, Stuka Jr., Tiger, Tritón, and Virus. Defending winner Rey Escorpión did not compete in the tournament.

The winner of the tournament was La Sombra, who last eliminated 2014 Rey del Aire Stuka Jr.

Order of elimination
Order	Wrestler	Eliminated by	Elimination(s)
1	Tritón	Tiger	0
2	Guerrero Maya Jr.	Puma	0
3	Fuego	Virus	0
4	Puma	Ángel de Oro	1
5	Delta	Kamaitachi	0
6	Tiger	Dragon Lee	1
7	Dragon Lee	Kamaitachi	2
7	Kamaitachi	Dragon Lee	2
9	Misterioso Jr.	Stuka Jr.	0
10	Virus	Niebla Roja	1
11	Ángel de Oro	Gran Guerrero	1
12	Gran Guerrero	Bárbaro Cavernario	1
13	Niebla Roja	La Sombra	1
14	Bárbaro Cavernario	Stuka Jr.	1
15	Stuka Jr.	La Sombra	2
—	La Sombra	Winner	2

==== 2016 ====
Reyes del Aire (2016)
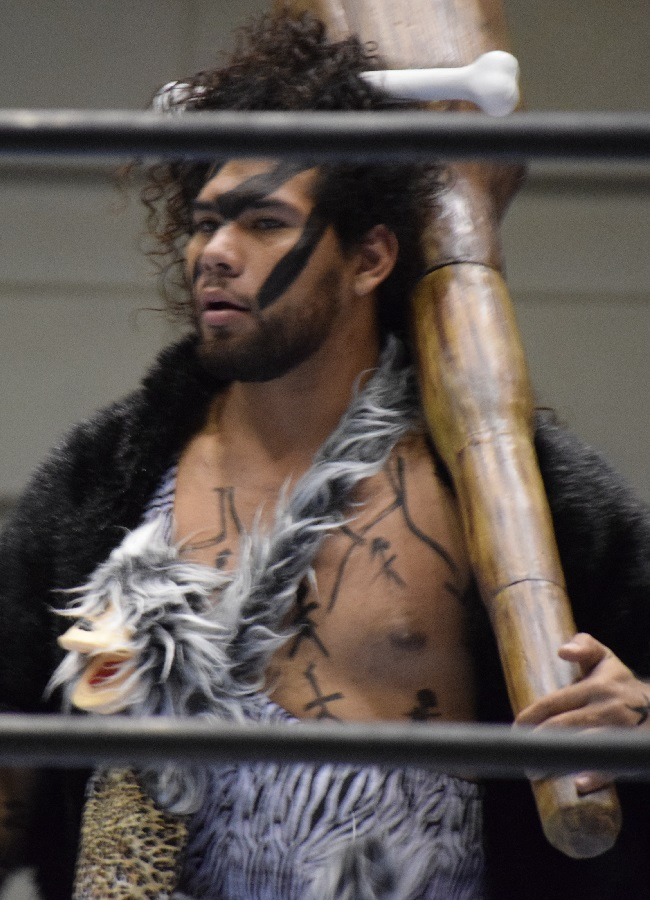
- 2016 Rey del Aire Bárbaro Cavernario
- Promotion: Consejo Mundial de Lucha Libre
- Date: September 23–30, 2016
- City: Mexico City, Mexico
- Venue: Arena México

Event chronology
← Previous; Leyendas Mexicanas	Next → Universal Championship

Reyes del Aire chronology
← Previous; 2016	Next → 2017

The 2016 Reyes del Aire was a professional wrestling tournament produced by the Mexican professional wrestling promotion Consejo Mundial de Lucha Libre. The tournament took place every Saturday from September 23 to 30, 2016, on Super Viernes at Arena México in Mexico City, Mexico. It was the 14th Reyes del Aire since 2005. It was sponsored by the Mexican newspaper ESTO, commemorating their 75th anniversary. The tournament consisted of two rounds. In the first round, the 12 competitors competed in a torneo cibernetico, a multi-man elimination match; the last two remaining competitors advanced to the tournament final, where they battled in a two-out-of-three falls match. The tournament featured técnico wrestlers Dragon Lee, Máscara Dorada, Máximo Sexy, Mistico, Valiente, and Volador Jr., as well as rudo wrestlers Bárbaro Cavernario, Dragón Rojo Jr., Euforia, La Máscara, Mephisto, and Negro Casas. Defending winner La Sombra did not compete in the tournament.

The winner of the tournament was Bárbaro Cavernario, who defeated former three-time Rey del Aire Volador Jr. 2–1 in the tournament final. In the final fall, Volador Jr. disqualified after Cavernerio tricked him into hitting the referee.

Night 1 (September 23)
No.	Results	Stipulations
1	Bárbaro Cavernario and Volador Jr. defeated Dragon Lee, Dragón Rojo Jr., Euforia, La Máscara, Máscara Dorada, Máximo Sexy, Mephisto, Mistico, Negro Casas, and Valiente	Torneo cibernetico Reyes del Aire first round match

Night 2 (September 30)
No.	Results	Stipulations	Times
1	Bárbaro Cavernario defeated Volador Jr. 2–1	Two-out-of-three falls Reyes del Aire tournament final	20:20

Order of elimination
Order	Wrestler	Eliminated by	Elimination(s)
1	Dragón Rojo Jr.	Valiente	0
2	La Máscara	via disqualification	0
3	Máscara Dorada	Negro Casas	0
4	Valiente	Euforia	1
5	Máximo Sexy	Mephisto	0
6	Negro Casas	Dragon Lee	1
7	Dragon Lee	Bárbaro Cavernario	1
8	Euforia	Volador Jr.	1
9	Místico	Bárbaro Cavernario	1
10	Mephisto	Volador Jr.	1
—	Bárbaro Cavernario	Finalists	1
—	Volador Jr.	Finalists	2

==== 2017 ====
Reyes del Aire (2017)
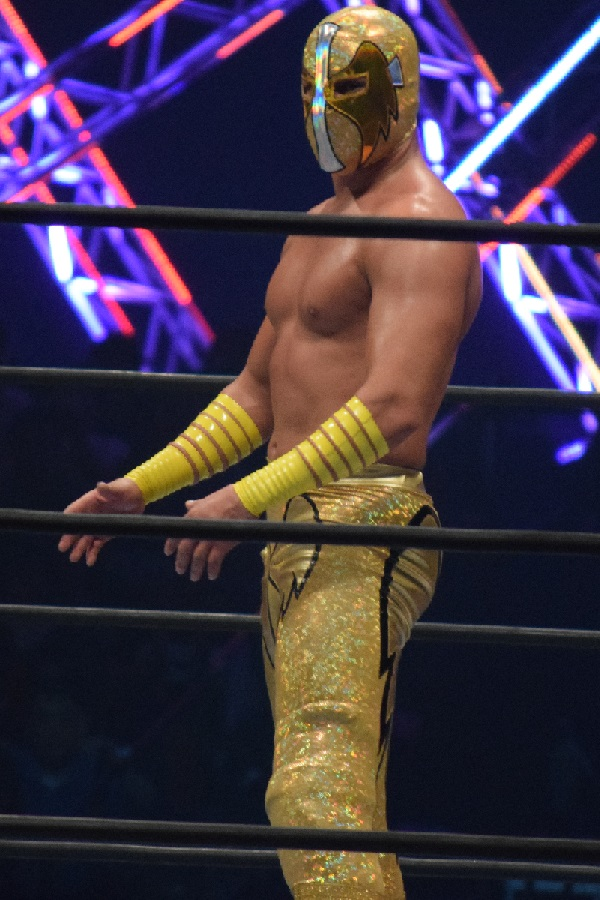
- Three-time and 2017 Reyes del Aire winner Ángel de Oro
- Promotion: Consejo Mundial de Lucha Libre
- Date: April 7, 2017
- City: Mexico City, Mexico
- Venue: Arena México

Event chronology
← Previous; Homenaje a Dos Leyendas	Next → La Copa Junior Nuevos Valores

Reyes del Aire chronology
← Previous; 2016	Next → 2019

The 2017 Reyes del Aire was a professional wrestling tournament produced by the Mexican professional wrestling promotion Consejo Mundial de Lucha Libre. The tournament took place on Friday, April 7, 2017, on Super Viernes at Arena México in Mexico City, Mexico. It was the 15th Reyes del Aire since 2005. Sixteen competitors competed in a torneo cibernetico, a multi-man elimination match. The competitors of the tournament were defending winner Bárbaro Cavernario, Ángel de Oro, Carístico, Dragon Lee, Euforia, Gran Guerrero, Hechicero, La Máscara, Luciferno, Máximo Sexy, Mephisto, Místico, Niebla Roja, Titán, Valiente, and Volador Jr..

After executing the "Backstabber" to Luciferno, in which Volador Jr. forced Luciferno's back to fall on his knees, Volador Jr. pinned him for the first elimination. Mephisto then threw Titán into Bárbaro Cavernario's dropkick, in which Cavernario kicked Titán with his soles, for the second elimination. Gran Guerrero was the third wrestler eliminated after getting hit by a superkick from Ángel de Oro, in which Oro kicked Guerrero with his lead foot, and a splash from Máximo Sexy, in which Sexy jumped off the top rope and landed on a supine Guerrero. Volador Jr. then landed "La Quebrada" on Mephisto, in which Volado Jr. did a backflip off the top rope before landing on a supine Mephisto, to pin him, while Dragon Lee simultaneously submitted to Hechicero. La Máscara later attacked Valiente for the sixth elimination. Místico got the seventh elimination after making the defending winner Cavernario tap out to "La Mistica", in which Místico spun Cavernario around while his legs were wrapped around Cavernario's head before slamming him face-first and stretching his arm while laying down on his back. After Hechicero was kissed by Sexy, he then hit a swinging backbreaker, in which Hechicero dropped Sexy back-first onto his knee, before pinning him. Carístico then made Máscara tap out to "La Mistica". Caristico suffered a beatdown by the rudos until Místico came to save him. Volador Jr. later eliminated Hechicero with the "Backstabber". Volador Jr. and Carístico, two of the remaining técnicos, had issues with each other leading to Volador Jr. ripping Carístico's mask apart. Místico tried to make peace between his fellow técnicos, but Euforia took advantage of the situation, causing Caristico to accidentally superkick Volador Jr. before Euforia made Caristico tap out. Niebla Roja then eliminated Místico after a flapjack, lifting Místico by his leg before slamming him down face-first.

The four remaining competitors in the match were Ángel de Oro, Euforia, Niebla Roja, and Volador Jr., who was unsuccessful in properly delivering the "Frankensteiner" to Roja, in which Volador Jr. jumped on the shoulders of a charging Roja before performing a backflip to drive Roja's head into the mat. Although, he still managed to pin and eliminate Roja. When Volador Jr. had Oro trapped in a submission hold, but Roja broke it up. Oro then tried to dive onto Volador Jr. and Roja, but they caught him and threw him into the crowd instead. When Volador Jr. attempted a dive on Oro, he got kicked instead; Euforia then made Volador Jr. submit. With only two remaining competitors remaining. Oro put Euforia in his own submission hold to make him tap out for the final elimination and to win the tournament. This was Oro's third Reyes del Aire victory, tying Volador Jr. for the most wins in the tournament's history.

Order of elimination
Order	Wrestler	Eliminated by	Method	Elimination(s)	Time
1	Luciferno	Volador Jr.	Pinfall	0	6:14
2	Titán	Bárbaro Cavernario	Pinfall	0	10:15
3	Gran Guerrero	Máximo Sexy	Pinfall	0	12:01
4	Dragon Lee	Hechicero	Submission	0	14:32
4	Mephisto	Volador Jr.	Pinfall	0	14:32
6	Valiente	La Máscara	Pinfall	0	17:39
7	Bárbaro Cavernario	Místico	Submission	1	18:22
8	Máximo Sexy	Hechicero	Pinfall	1	19:57
9	La Máscara	Carístico	Submission	1	20:25
10	Hechicero	Volador Jr.	Pinfall	2	21:41
11	Carístico	Euforia	Submission	1	23:41
12	Místico	Niebla Roja	Pinfall	1	24:15
13	Niebla Roja	Volador Jr.	Pinfall	1	24:47
14	Volador Jr.	Euforia	Submission	4	29:35
15	Euforia	Ángel de Oro	Submission	2	29:44
—	Ángel de Oro	Winner		1	29:44

==== 2017 VIP Puebla ====
Reyes del Aire (2017 VIP Puebla)
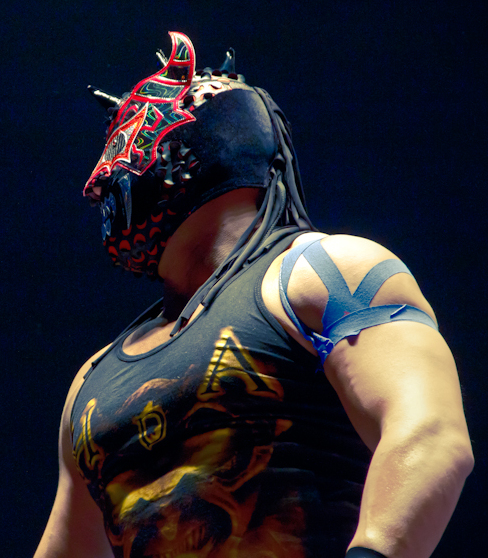
- 2017 Reyes del Aire VIP Puebla winner Mephisto
- Promotion: Consejo Mundial de Lucha Libre
- Date: December 11, 2017
- City: Puebla, Puebla, Mexico
- Venue: Arena Puebla

Reyes del Aire chronology
← Previous; 2017	Next → 2019

The 2017 Reyes del Aire VIP Puebla (Spanish for "Kings of the Air VIP Puebla") was a professional wrestling tournament produced by the Mexican professional wrestling promotion Consejo Mundial de Lucha Libre (CMLL). The tournament took place on Monday, December 11, 2017, on Lunes Arena Puebla at Arena Puebla in Puebla, Puebla, Mexico. It was the second Reyes del Aire edition of the year. This is the first edition that CMLL does not officially recognize. Ten competitors competed in a torneo cibernetico, a multi-man elimination match. The competitors of the tournament were Dragon Lee, El Felino, Gran Guerrero, Mephisto, Místico, Niebla Roja, Pólvora, Rey Bucanero, Valiente, and Volador Jr.

The winner of the tournament was Mephisto, who last eliminated former three-time Reyes del Aire winner Volador Jr. Although, CMLL does not officially recognize Mephisto's tournament win.

Order of elimination
Order	Wrestler	Eliminated by	Elimination(s)
1	Pólvora	Dragon Lee	0
2	Valiente	Rey Bucanero	0
3	El Felino	Niebla Roja	0
4	Dragon Lee	Mephisto	1
5	Rey Bucanero	Místico	1
6	Niebla Roja	Gran Guerrero	1
7	Gran Guerrero	Volador Jr.	1
8	Místico	Mephisto	1
9	Volador Jr.	Mephisto	1
—	Mephisto	Winner	3

==== 2019 ====
Reyes del Aire (2019)
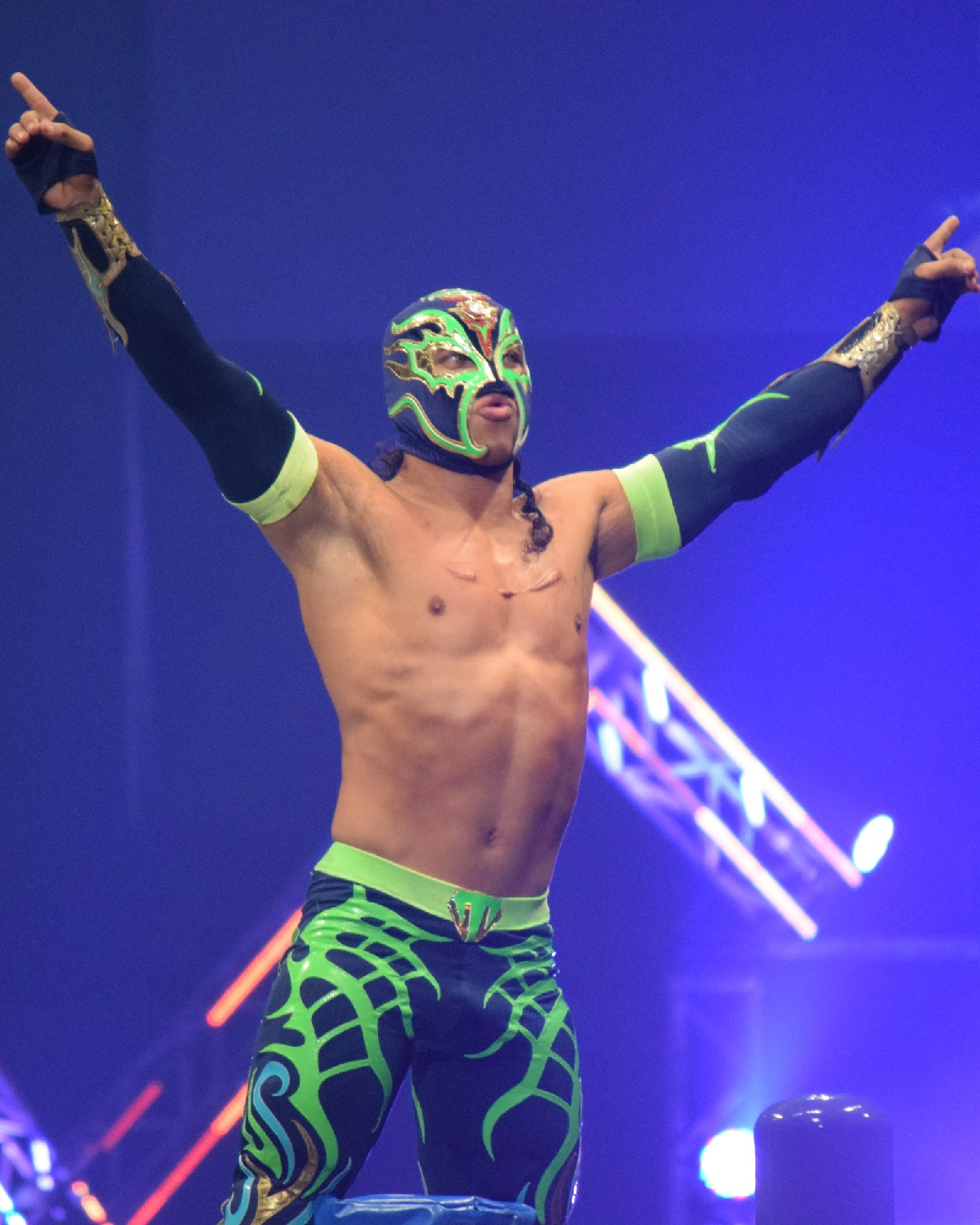
- 2019 Rey del Aire Titán
- Promotion: Consejo Mundial de Lucha Libre
- Date: January 6, 2019
- City: Mexico City, Mexico
- Venue: Arena México

Event chronology
← Previous; Sin Piedad	Next → Fantastica Mania

Reyes del Aire chronology
← Previous; 2017 VIP Puebla	Next → 2020

The 2019 Reyes del Aire (Spanish for "Kings of the Air") was a professional wrestling event and tournament produced by the Mexican professional wrestling promotion Consejo Mundial de Lucha Libre (CMLL). It took place on Sunday, January 6, 2019, at Arena México in Mexico City, Mexico. It was the 16th official Reyes del Aire since 2005 and part of CMLL's annual Three Kings' day celebration. Sixteen competitors competed in a torneo cibernetico, a multi-man elimination match. The competitors of the tournament were Audaz, Black Panther, Drone, Esfinge, Flyer, Kawato-San, Pólvora, Rey Cometa, Sagrado, Templario, Tiger, Titán, Tritón, Universo 2000 Jr., Vangellys, and Virus.

The winner of the tournament was Titán, who last eliminated Templario.

Order of elimination
Order	Wrestler	Eliminated by	Elimination(s)
1	Universo 2000 Jr.	Black Panther	0
2	Drone	Virus	0
3	Sagrado	Tritón	0
4	Black Panther	Tiger	1
5	Virus	Flyer	1
6	Esfinge	Pólvora	0
7	Tiger	Rey Cometa	1
8	Pólvora	Audaz	1
9	Rey Cometa	Vangellys	1
10	Audaz	Kawato-San	1
11	Vangellys	Titán	1
12	Kawato-San	Tritón	2
12	Tritón	Kawato-San	2
14	Flyer	Templario	1
15	Templario	Titán	1
—	Titán	Winner	2

=== 2020s ===
==== 2020 ====
Reyes del Aire (2020)
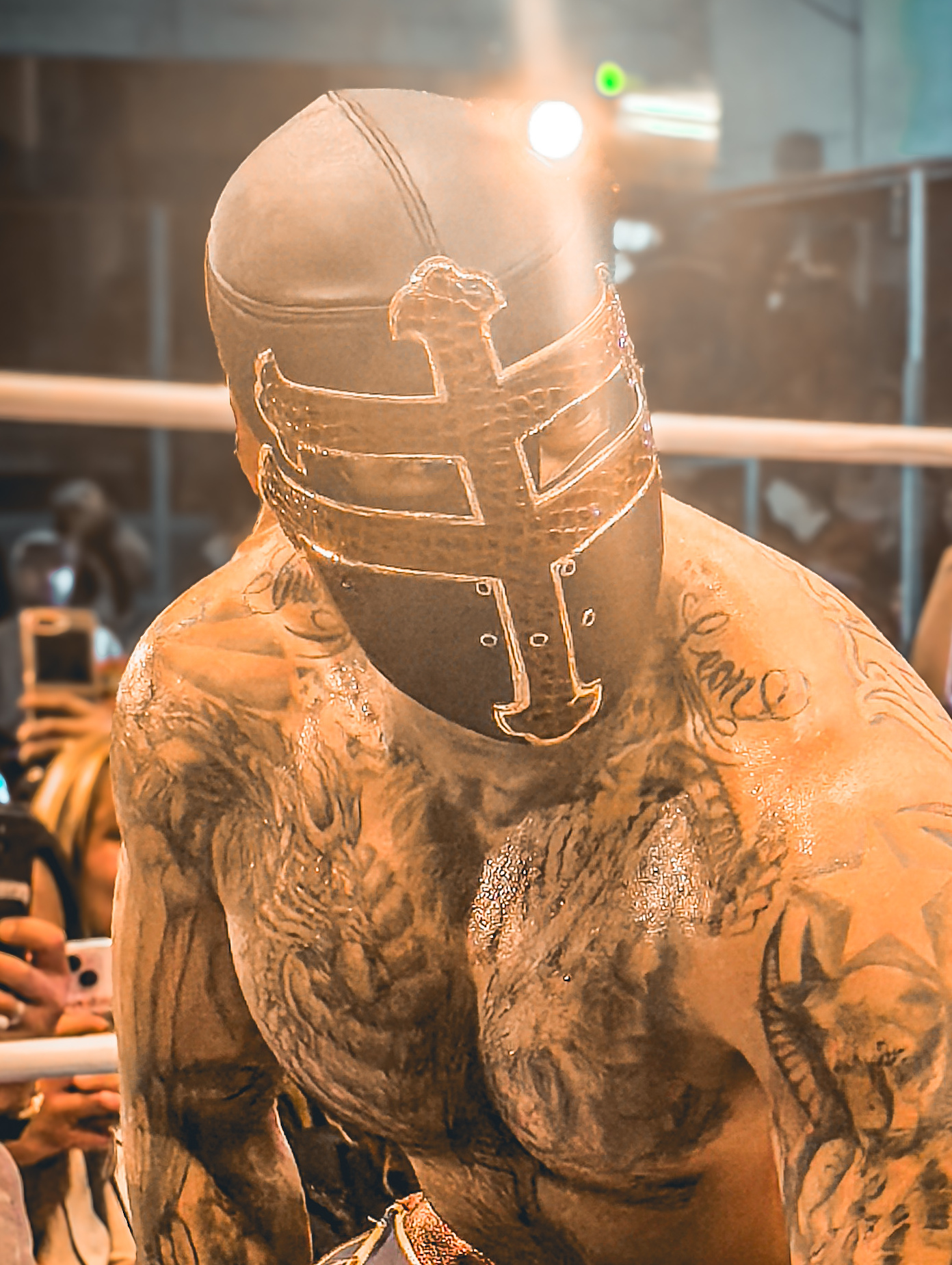
- 2020 Rey del Aire Templario
- Promotion: Consejo Mundial de Lucha Libre
- Date: January 14, 2020
- City: Mexico City, Mexico
- Venue: Arena México

Event chronology
← Previous; Fantastica Mania	Next → La Noche de Mr. Niebla

Reyes del Aire chronology
← Previous; 2019	Next → 2022 VIP

The 2020 Reyes del Aire (Spanish for "Kings of the Air") was a professional wrestling tournament produced by the Mexican professional wrestling promotion Consejo Mundial de Lucha Libre. The tournament took place on Tuesday, January 14, 2020, on Martes Arena Mexico at Arena México in Mexico City, Mexico. It was the 17th official Reyes del Aire since 2005. Twelve competitors competed in a torneo cibernetico, a multi-man elimination match. The tournament features técnico wrestlers Black Panther, Drone, Esfinge, Príncipe Diamante, Rey Cometa, and Star Jr., as well as rudo wrestlers Akuma, Disturbio, El Hijo del Signo, Kawato San, Templario, and Virus. Defending winner Titán did not compete in the tournament.

Akuma was the first to get eliminated after losing to Drone. Principe Diamante was next after getting eliminated after a backbreaker by Disturbio, dropping Diamante's back onto his knee. Black Panther eliminated El Hijo del Signo, and then Kawato San eliminated Drone with a neckbreaker, in which San attacked Drone's neck. Panther was eliminated by Virus, and then San lost to a 450° moonsault by Rey Cometa, in which Cometa backflipped off the top rope before doing a somersault with 1.5 rotations, who was the next elimination after falling to Templario's powerbomb, in which Templario lifted Cometa up his shoulders before slamming him down. Esfinge then eliminated Disturbio with the "Nudo Egipcio", a type of pin where Esfinge tied his and Disturbio's legs before arching his back. Templario then eliminated Esfinge, and then Star Jr. made Virus tap out to "La Balanza". With only two competitors remaining, Templario defeated Star Jr. with a superplex, in which Templario flipped Star Jr. off the top rope over his shoulders, to win the tournament.

Order of elimination
Order	Wrestler	Eliminated by	Elimination(s)	Time
1	Akuma	Drone	0	—N/a
2	Príncipe Diamante	Disturbio	0	—N/a
3	El Hijo del Signo	Black Panther	0	—N/a
4	Drone	Kawato San	1	—N/a
5	Black Panther	Virus	1	—N/a
6	Kawato San	Rey Cometa	1	—N/a
7	Rey Cometa	Templario	1	—N/a
8	Disturbio	Esfinge	1	—N/a
9	Esfinge	Templario	1	—N/a
10	Virus	Star Jr.	1	—N/a
11	Star Jr.	Templario	1	23:29
—	Templario	Winner	3	23:29

==== 2022 VIP ====
Reyes del Aire (2022 VIP)
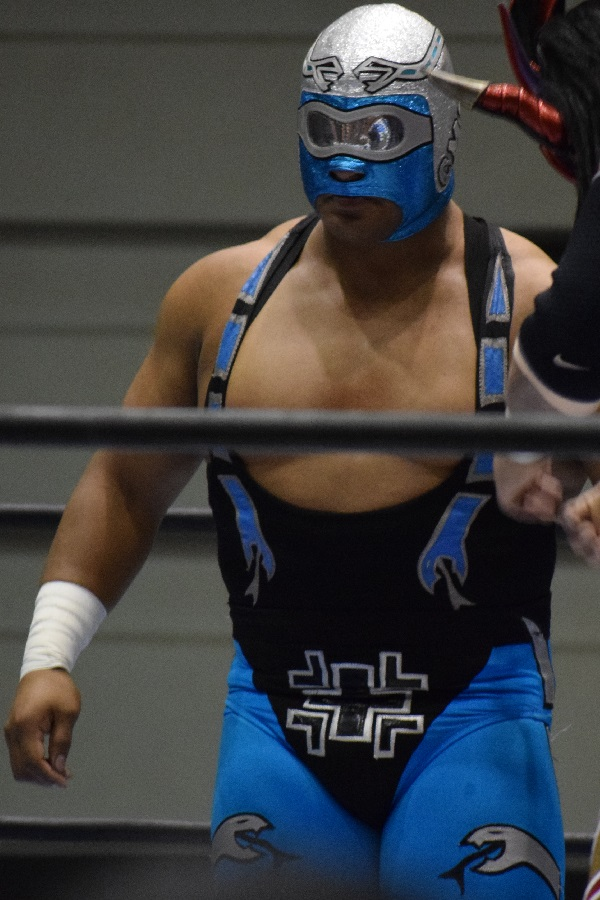
- Two-time and 2022 Reyes del Aire VIP winner Stuka Jr.
- Promotion: Consejo Mundial de Lucha Libre
- Date: January 28, 2022
- City: Mexico City, Mexico
- Venue: Arena México

Event chronology
← Previous; Sin Salida 2022	Next → —

Reyes del Aire chronology
← Previous; 2020	Next → —

The 2022 Reyes del Aire VIP (Spanish for "Kings of the Air VIP") was a professional wrestling tournament produced by the Mexican professional wrestling promotion Consejo Mundial de Lucha Libre. The tournament took place on Friday, January 28, 2022, on Viernes Espectacular at Arena México in Mexico City, Mexico. It was the 18th official Reyes del Aire since 2005. Eleven competitors competed in a torneo cibernetico, a multi-man elimination match. The competitors of the tournament were defending winner Templario, Atlantis Jr., Dragon Rojo Jr., El Barbaro Cavernario, El Soberano Jr., Gran Guerrero, Negro Casas, Stuka Jr., Templario, Titán, and Volador Jr.

Defending winner Templario was eliminated sixth by Atlantis Jr, who was one of the last two competitors along with Stuka Jr. Atlantis Jr. was disqualified after he tore off Stuka Jr.'s mask, making Stuka Jr. the winner of the tournament. This was Stuka Jr.'s second Reyes del Aire tournament win; his first win was in 2014.

Order of elimination
Order	Wrestler	Eliminated by	Elimination(s)
1	Negro Casas	Titán	0
2	Dragon Rojo Jr.	El Soberano Jr.	0
3	Titán	El Bárbaro Cavernario	1
4	El Soberano Jr.	Gran Guerrero	1
5	El Barbaro Cavernario	Volador Jr.	1
6	Templario	Atlantis Jr.	0
7	Volador Jr.	Gran Guerrero	1
8	Gran Guerrero	Stuka Jr.	2
9	Atlantis Jr.	via disqualification	1
—	Stuka Jr.	Winner	1

==== 2023 VIP ====
Reyes del Aire (2023 VIP)
- Promotion: Consejo Mundial de Lucha Libre
- Date: January 27, 2023
- City: Mexico City, Mexico
- Venue: Arena México

Reyes del Aire chronology
← Previous; 2022 VIP	Next → 2024

The 2023 Reyes del Aire (Spanish for "Kings of the Air") was a professional wrestling tournament produced by the Mexican professional wrestling promotion Consejo Mundial de Lucha Libre. The tournament took place on Friday, January 27, 2023, on Viernes Espectacular at Arena México in Mexico City, Mexico. It was the 19th official Reyes del Aire since 2005. Ten competitors competed in a torneo cibernetico, a multi-man elimination match. The competitors of the tournament were defending winner Stuka Jr., Atlantis Jr., Bárbaro Cavernario, Dragón Rojo Jr., Fugaz, Gran Guerrero, Místico, Panterita del Ring Jr., Soberano Jr., and Templario.

Defending winner Stuka Jr. was eliminated fourth by Soberano Jr. The winner of the tournament was Dragón Rojo Jr., who last eliminated 2020 Reyes del Aire winner Templario.

Order of elimination
Order	Wrestler	Eliminated by	Elimination(s)	Time
1	Bárbaro Cavernario	Místico	0	—N/a
2	Fugaz	Stuka Jr.	0	—N/a
3	Atlantis Jr.	Gran Guerrero	0	—N/a
4	Stuka Jr.	Soberano Jr.	1	—N/a
5	Soberano Jr.	Templario	1	—N/a
6	Panterita del Ring Jr.	Dragón Rojo Jr.	0	—N/a
7	Místico	Gran Guerrero	1	—N/a
8	Gran Guerrero	Templario	2	—N/a
9	Templario	Dragón Rojo Jr.	2	34:49
—	Dragón Rojo Jr.	Winner	2	34:49

==== 2024 ====
Reyes del Aire (2024)
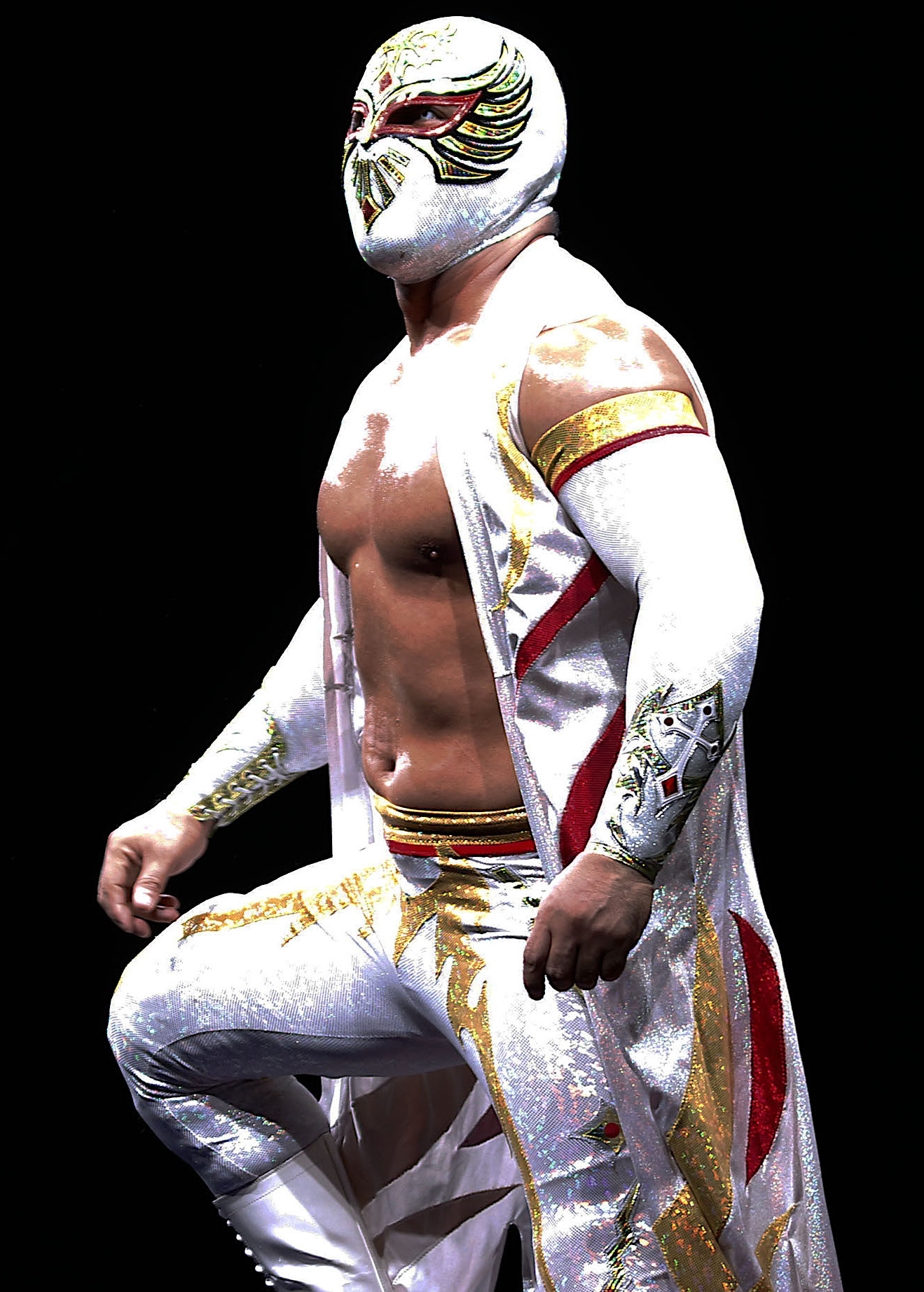
- 2024 Rey del Aire Místico
- Promotion: Consejo Mundial de Lucha Libre
- Date: February 6, 2024
- City: Mexico City, Mexico
- Venue: Arena México

Reyes del Aire chronology
← Previous; 2023 VIP	Next → 2024 Puebla

The 2024 Reyes del Aire (Spanish for "Kings of the Air") was a professional wrestling tournament produced by the Mexican professional wrestling promotion Consejo Mundial de Lucha Libre. The tournament took place on Tuesday, February 6, 2024, on Martes de Arena México at Arena México in Mexico City, Mexico. It was the 20th official Reyes del Aire since 2005. Twelve competitors competed in a torneo cibernetico, a multi-man elimination match. The competitors of the tournament were Ángel de Oro, Esfinge, Flip Gordon, Máscara Dorada, Místico, Soberano Jr., Star Jr., Templario, Titán, Villano III Jr., Volador Jr., and Zandokan Jr. Defending winner Dragón Rojo Jr. did not compete in the tournament.

The winner of the tournament was Místico, who last eliminated former three-time Reyes del Aire winner Ángel de Oro.

No.	Results	Stipulations	Times
1	Místico defeated Ángel de Oro, Esfinge, Flip Gordon, Máscara Dorada, Soberano Jr., Star Jr., Templario, Titán, Villano III Jr., Volador Jr., and Zandokan Jr.	12-man Reyes del Aire torneo cibernetico	45:06

==== 2024 Puebla ====
Reyes del Aire (2024 Puebla)
- Promotion: Consejo Mundial de Lucha Libre
- Date: April 8, 2024
- City: Puebla, Puebla, Mexico
- Venue: Arena Puebla

Reyes del Aire chronology
← Previous; 2024	Next → 2025

The 2024 Reyes del Aire Puebla (Spanish for "Kings of the Air Puebla") was a professional wrestling tournament produced by the Mexican professional wrestling promotion Consejo Mundial de Lucha Libre (CMLL). The tournament took place on Monday, April 8, 2024, on Lunes Clasico at Arena Puebla in Puebla, Puebla, Mexico. It was the second edition of the year. Like the 2017 VIP Puebla edition, CMLL does not officially recognize this edition. The ten competitors were evenly split into two teams for a 10-man tag team elimination match; Equipo Guadalajara consisted of Fuego, Raider, Robin, Valiente Jr., and Vegas Depredador, while Equipo Puebla consisted of Arkalis, Novato, Pegasso, Rey Samuray, and Xelhua.

Equipo Puebla defeated Equipo Guadalajara, with Arkalis scoring the victory for his team. Arkalis was awarded as the Reyes del Aire winner, but this tournament win is not officially recognized by CMLL.

No.	Results	Stipulations
1	Equipo Puebla (Arkalis, Novato, Pegasso, Rey Samuray, and Xelhua) defeated Equipo Guadalajara (Fuego, Raider, Robin, Valiente Jr., and Vegas Depredador)	Torneo cibernetico Reyes del Aire Reyes del Aire match

==== 2025 ====
Reyes del Aire (2025)
- Promotion: Consejo Mundial de Lucha Libre
- Date: February 4, 2025
- City: Mexico City, Mexico
- Venue: Arena México

Reyes del Aire chronology
← Previous; 2024 Puebla	Next → 2026

The 2025 Reyes del Aire (Spanish for "Kings of the Air") was a professional wrestling tournament produced by the Mexican professional wrestling promotion Consejo Mundial de Lucha Libre. The tournament took place on Tuesday, February 4, 2025, on Martes Populares at Arena México in Mexico City, Mexico. It was the 21st official Reyes del Aire since 2005. Twelve competitors competed in a torneo cibernetico, a multi-man elimination match. The tournament featured former winners Ángel de Oro, Dragón Rojo Jr., Místico, Stuka Jr., Templario, and Titán, as well as new competitors Brillante Jr., Capitán Suicida, Futuro, Max Star, Neón, and Valiente Jr.

The winner of the tournament was Neón, who last eliminated 2020 Reyes del Aire winner Templario with the "Swanton Bomb", in which Neón leaped off the top rope with his arms out-stretched and then doing a flip before landing on a supine Templario.

Order of elimination
Order	Wrestler	Eliminated by	Elimination(s)	Time
1	Brillante Jr.	Valiente Jr.	0	7:57
2	Futuro	Titán	0	10:43
3	Max Star	Templario	0	13:49
4	Valiente Jr.	Capitán Suicida	1	16:16
5	Dragón Rojo Jr.	Titán	0	19:59
6	Capitán Suicida	Místico	1	22:17
7	Titán	Stuka Jr.	2	23:57
8	Stuka Jr.	Neón	1	26:35
9	Ángel de Oro	Místico	0	28:51
10	Místico	Templario	2	29:17
11	Templario	Neón	2	39:04
—	Neón	Winner	2	39:04

==== 2026 ====
Reyes del Aire (2026)
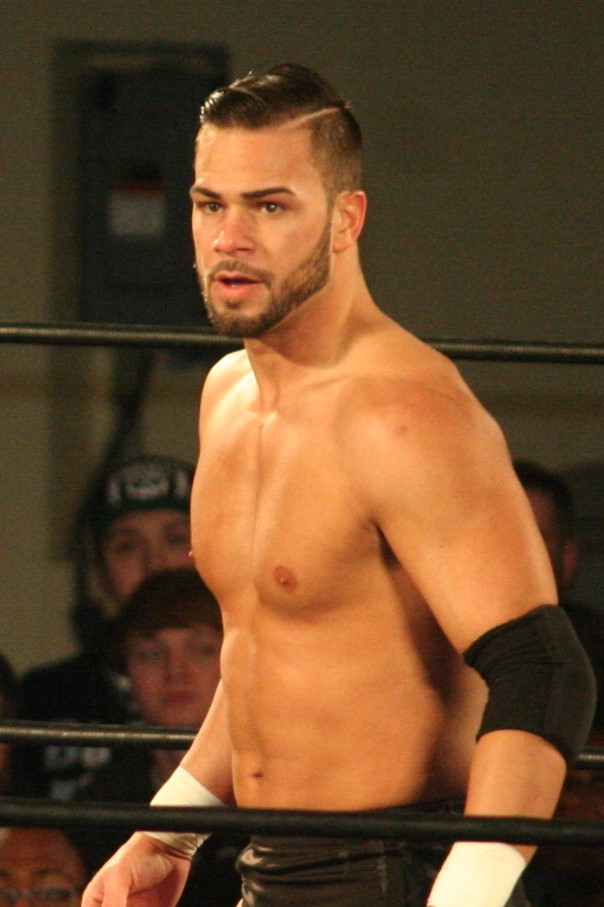
- 2026 Rey del Aire Flip Gordon
- Promotion: Consejo Mundial de Lucha Libre
- Date: February 3, 2026
- City: Mexico City, Mexico
- Venue: Arena México

Reyes del Aire chronology
← Previous; 2025	Next → 2026 Puebla

The 2026 Reyes del Aire (Spanish for "Kings of the Air") was a professional wrestling tournament produced by the Mexican professional wrestling promotion Consejo Mundial de Lucha Libre. The tournament took place on Tuesday, February 3, 2026, on Martes de Arena México at Arena México in Mexico City, Mexico. It was the 22nd official Reyes del Aire since 2005. Twelve competitors competed in a torneo cibernetico, a multi-man elimination match. The competitors of the tournament were defending winner Neón, Bárbaro Cavernario, Barboza, El Cobarde, El Hijo de Stuka Jr., El Hijo del Pantera, Explosivo, Flip Gordon, Fugaz, Máscara Dorada, Volador Jr., and Yutani.

Defending winner Neón was eliminated seventh. The winner of the tournament was Flip Gordon, who last eliminated Yutani. This marked Gordon's first tournament victory in his career.

Order of elimination
Order	Wrestler	Eliminated by	Time
1	Fugaz	—N/a	—N/a
2	Barboza	—N/a	—N/a
3	El Hijo del Pantera	—N/a	—N/a
4	El Hijo de Stuka Jr.	—N/a	—N/a
5	Explosivo	—N/a	—N/a
6	El Cobarde	—N/a	—N/a
7	Neón	—N/a	—N/a
8	Volador Jr.	—N/a	—N/a
9	Máscara Dorada	—N/a	—N/a
10	Bárbaro Cavernario	—N/a	—N/a
11	Yutani	Flip Gordon	38:12
—	Flip Gordon	Winner	38:12

==== 2026 Puebla ====
Reyes del Aire (2026 Puebla)
- Promotion: Consejo Mundial de Lucha Libre
- Date: March 9, 2026
- City: Puebla, Puebla, Mexico
- Venue: Arena Puebla

Reyes del Aire chronology
← Previous; 2026	Next → —

The 2026 Reyes del Aire (Spanish for "Kings of the Air") was a professional wrestling tournament produced by the Mexican professional wrestling promotion Consejo Mundial de Lucha Libre (CMLL). The tournament took place on Monday, March 9, 2026, on Lunes Clasico at Arena Puebla in Puebla, Puebla, Mexico. It was the second edition of the year and the third edition not officially recognized by CMLL since 2017 VIP Puebla. Eight competitors competed in a torneo cibernetico, a multi-man elimination match. The competitors of the tournament were Blue Shark, Capitán Suicida, El Coyote, El Vigia, Rayo Metálico, Raider, Robin, and Tiger Boy.

The winner of the tournament was Raider, but this tournament win is not officially recognized by CMLL.

No.	Results	Stipulations
1	Raider defeated Blue Shark, Capitán Suicida, El Coyote, El Vigia, Rayo Metálico, Robin, and Tiger Boy	Torneo cibernetico Reyes del Aire Reyes del Aire match
