= Xelhua (wrestler) =

Mexican professional wrestler

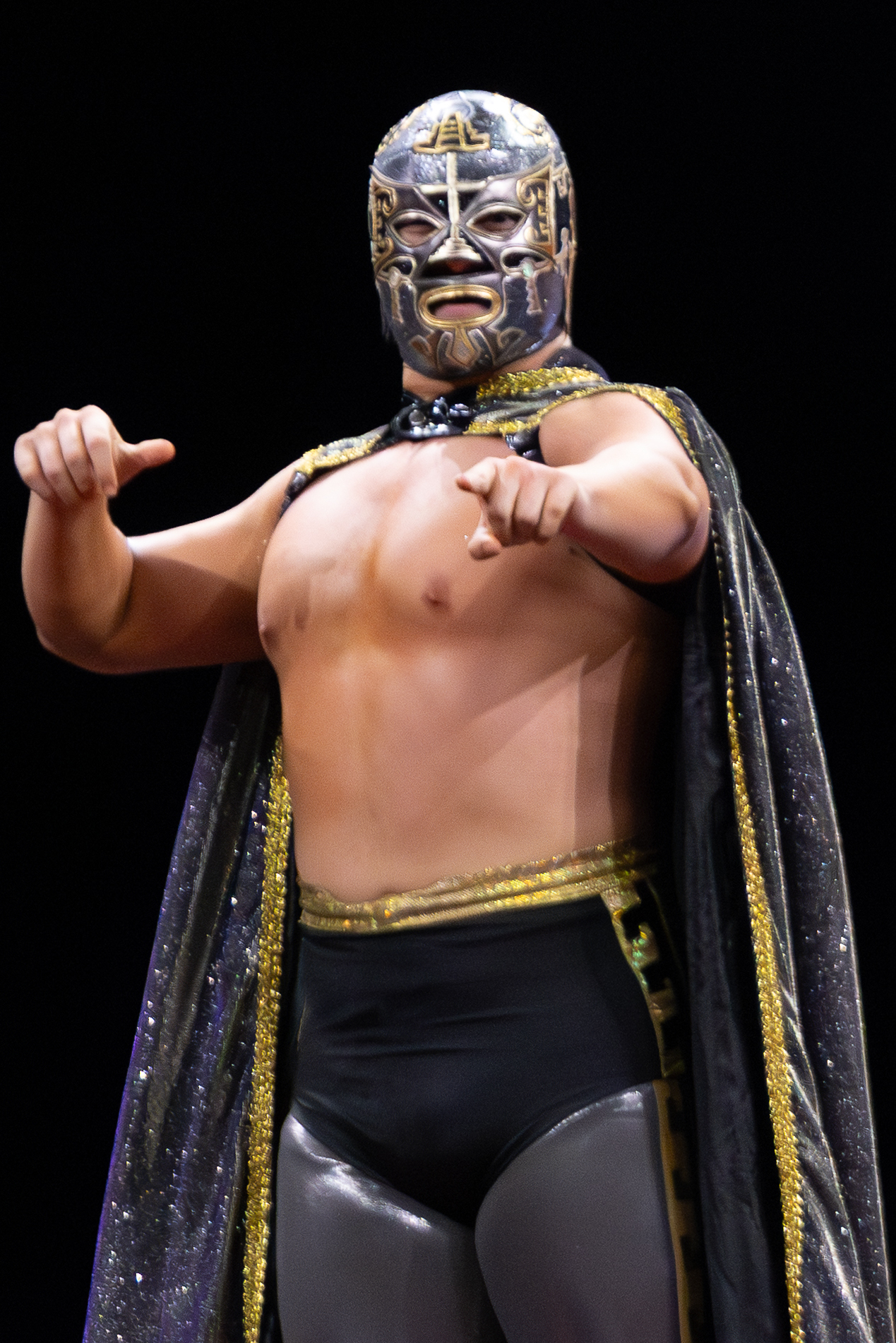
- Xelhua at ROH Supercard of Honor in May 2026

Personal information
- Born: 5 April 2004 (age 22) Cholula, Puebla, Mexico

Professional wrestling career
- Billed height: 186 cm (6 ft 1 in)
- Trained by: Ciclón Ramirez; SWAT; Tony Salazar; Último Guerrero; Volador Jr.
- Debut: 9 May 2023

Xelhua (born 5 April 2004) is a Mexican professional wrestler signed to Consejo Mundial de Lucha Libre (CMLL). He has also wrestled for New Japan Pro-Wrestling (NJPW) and Ring of Honor (ROH), the sister promotion of All Elite Wrestling (AEW), through CMLL's partnership with both promotions. Xelhua's real name is not publicly known, as is often the case with masked wrestlers in Mexico, where their private lives are kept a secret from the fans.

== Professional wrestling career ==
=== Consejo Mundial de Lucha Libre (2023–present) ===
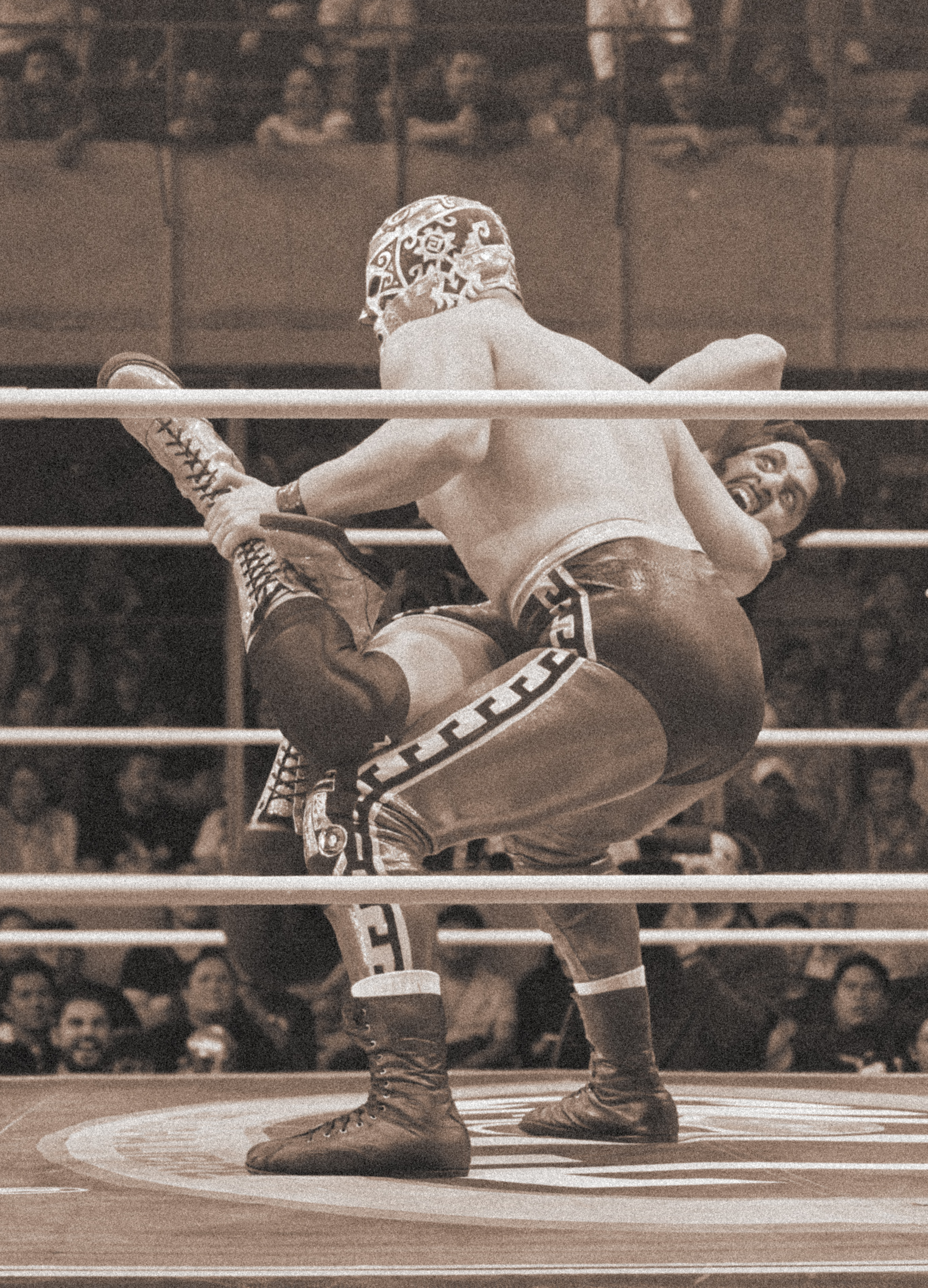
Xelhua facing Mansoor in 2026

Xelhua made his professional wrestling debut for Consejo Mundial de Lucha Libre (CMLL) on 9 May 2023 at Arena Coliseo in Guadalajara. Early on, Xelhua primarily wrestled in his native Puebla, including at the Arena Puebla 70th Anniversary Show on 17 July, where he, Asturiano and Prayer defeated Futuro, Neón and Vegas in the opening match. On 8 July 2024, he and Vegas outlasted Arkalis, Astral, Audaz, Electrico, Multy, Pegasso, Rayo Metálico and Valiente Jr. in a torneo cibernetico to face each other for the CMLL Arena Barroco Championship the following week, where Xelhua won the title. Xelhua subsequently entered a feud with Guerrero Maya Jr., but unsuccessfully challenged for his Mexican National Heavyweight Championship on 12 October. Later that month, Xelhua defeated Guerrero Maya Jr., Arkalis, Multy, Pegasso, Perverso, Rey Samuray and Stigma to qualify for the finals of the Rey del Inframundo ("King of the Underworld") tournament on 1 November, a four-way elimination match, which was won by Difunto.

At Noche de Campeones ("Night of Champions") on 26 September 2025, Xelhua unsuccessfully challenged Atlantis Jr. for the NWA World Historic Light Heavyweight Championship. Three months later, Xelhua and Atlantis Jr. were paired for the Torneo Gran Alternativa ("Great Alternative Tournament"), in which a rookie teams with a veteran. They defeated El Hijo del Pantera and Templario in the first round and Euforia and Gallero in the semi-finals, before defeating Ángel de Oro and Yutani in the finals on 19 December to win the tournament. Following this, Xelhua answered Claudio Castagnoli's open challenge for the CMLL World Heavyweight Championship, but failed to win the title on 30 January 2026. On 16 April, Xelhua participated in CMLL's first standalone event in the United States at Palms Slam Fest, where he, Esfinge and Templario lost to Barboza, Difunto and Soberano Jr.

=== New Japan Pro-Wrestling (2025–present) ===
In February 2025, Xelhua made his debut for New Japan Pro-Wrestling (NJPW) as part of the CMLL and NJPW co-promoted Fantastica Mania 2025 tour. He and Stigma, as La Fuerza Poblana ("The Puebla Force"), participated in a faction tag team tournament, losing to Los Ingobernables de Japón (BUSHI and Titán) in the first round, as well as CozyMAX (Okumura and Satoshi Kojima) in the third place match.

=== Ring of Honor (2025–present) ===
Through CMLL's working relationship with All Elite Wrestling (AEW), Xelhua made his debut for their sister promotion, Ring of Honor (ROH), on 31 July 2025 episode of Ring of Honor Wrestling, defeating Virus. On 29 August at Death Before Dishonor, he unsuccessfully challenged Lee Moriarty for the ROH Pure Championship. At Supercard of Honor on 15 May 2026, Xelhua failed to win the AEW National Championship from Mark Davis.

== Championships and accomplishments ==
- Consejo Mundial de Lucha Libre
  - CMLL Arena Barroco Championship (2024)
  - Torneo Gran Alternativa (2025) – with Atlantis Jr.
  - Rey del Inframundo (2026)
- Pro Wrestling Illustrated
  - Ranked No. 144 in the PWI 500 in 2025
