= Valiente Jr. =

Mexican professional wrestler (born 2000)

Personal information
- Born: January 2, 2000 (age 26) Mexico
- Family: Valiente (father)

Professional wrestling career
- Ring name: Valiente Jr.
- Billed height: 1.70 m (5 ft 7 in)
- Billed weight: 85 kg (187 lb)
- Debut: February 2020

Valiente Jr. (born January 2, 2000) is a Mexican professional wrestler signed to Consejo Mundial de Lucha Libre (CMLL), where he is a member of the Los Viajeros Del Espacio stable. He also makes appearances for partner promotion New Japan Pro-Wrestling (NJPW).

He is a second-generation wrestler, being the son of Valiente. His real name is not a matter of public record, as is often the case with masked wrestlers in Mexico, where their private lives are kept a secret from the fans.

== Professional wrestling career ==
=== Early career (2020–2021) ===
Since Valiente Jr. has never been unmasked, his birth name has not been revealed, nor reported on. He began his professional wrestling career in February 2020. On November 20, as part of Indy Army Wrestling (IAW)'s November to Remember event, he and seven other wrestlers competed for the Copa Principe Aereo ("Principe Aereo Cup"), which was won by Gravity. On May 29, 2021, at Homenaje a Skayde ("Homage to Skayde"), Valiente Jr. unsuccessfully challenged Ciclon Infernal for the IAW Junior Championship.

=== Consejo Mundial de Lucha Libre (2021–present) ===
==== Early years (2021–2025) ====
Valiente Jr. made his debut appearance for Consejo Mundial de Lucha Libre (CMLL) on December 19, 2021, teaming with Voltran in a loss to Charly Madrid and Neón. On December 16, 2022, he and his father, Valiente, participated in the Torneo Gran Alternativa ("Great Alternative Tournament"), which pairs a rookie with a veteran, but lost to Gran Guerrero and Raider in the first round.

At Sin Salida ("No Escape") on January 1, 2023, Valiente Jr. was one of twelve wrestlers who put their mask on the line in a steel cage match, held under Lucha de Apuestas ("bet match") rules. He and Apocalipsis were the final two wrestlers left in the cage as the nine others escaped. In the end, Valiente Jr. defeated Apocalipsis, forcing him to unmask and reveal his birth name in the process. On June 4, he and his father entered the family-oriented Copa Dinastías ("Dynasties Cup") tournament, but lost to Euforia and Soberano Jr. in the first round. Valiente Jr. wrestled in the opening match of Sin Salida on January 1, 2024, teaming with Futuro to defeat Arlequín and Draego. He and his father were defeated by Furia Roja and Último Guerrero in the first round of the Torneo Gran Alternativa on January 26, 2024, as well as by Máscara Dorada and Panterita del Ring in that year's Copa Dinastías on June 6. On July 8, Valiente Jr. participated in a torneo cibernetico to determine the next challengers for the CMLL Arena Barroco Championship, where he eliminated Pegasso, before being the second to last wrestler eliminated by Xelhua, one-half of the eventual winners. Valiente Jr. also received the opportunity to compete in the annual Reyes del Aire ("Kings of the Air") tournament on February 4, 2025, where he scored the first elimination over Brillante Jr., before being the fourth wrestler eliminated by Capitán Suicida.

==== Los Viajeros Del Espacio (2025–present) ====
In August, Valiente Jr. became an official member of the Los Viajeros Del Espacio ("The Space Travelers") stable alongside Futuro and Max Star. On October 28, he participated in the semi-final torneo cibernetico of the Rey del Inframundo ("King of the Underworld") tournament, eliminating Max Star before being eliminated by Rugido. He wrestled at CMLL's first standalone event in the United States at Palms Slam Fest on April 16, 2026, teaming with Esfinge and Xelhua in a loss to Barboza, Difunto and Soberano Jr. Valiente Jr. was a participant in the inaugural torneo cibernetico for the Copa Daniel García ("Daniel García Cup"), held in honor of Huracán Ramírez, on September 20, 2026, where he eliminated Pantera Jr. and Futuro before being the second to last wrestler eliminated by Suicida 21 minutes in.

=== New Japan Pro-Wrestling (2026–present) ===
In February 2026, Valiente Jr. made his debut for New Japan Pro-Wrestling (NJPW) as part of the Fantastica Mania 2026 tour, co-promoted by CMLL and NJPW. He and Futuro participated in a tag team tournament, defeating Hijo de Stuka Jr. and Shoma Kato in the first round, before losing to Sky Team (Máscara Dorada and Místico) in the semi-finals. In May, Valiente Jr. was invited back to Japan to participate in NJPW's annual Best of the Super Juniors tournament. During his second tournament match against Ryusuke Taguchi, the match was stopped after Valiente Jr. suffered an apparent knee injury, awarding Taguchi the victory via referee stoppage. Regardless, he finished the tournament with six points after three wins and six losses, failing to advance to the semi-finals.

== Luchas de Apuestas record ==
Winner (wager)	Loser (wager)	Location	Event	Date	Notes
Valiente Jr. (mask)	Apocalipsis (mask)	Mexico City	Sin Salida	January 1, 2023	
