= Máscara Dorada II =

Mexican professional wrestler

Máscara Dorada
- Dorada in 2026

Personal information
- Born: 22 May 2001 (age 25) Mexico City, Mexico

Professional wrestling career
- Ring name(s): Panterita del Ring Jr. Foxyn; Máscara Dorada (II); Máscara Dorada 2.0
- Billed height: 5 ft 7 in (170 cm)
- Billed weight: 75 kg (165 lb)
- Trained by: Ephesto; Último Guerrero; Robin
- Debut: April 30, 2021

Máscara Dorada (born May 22, 2001) is the ring name of a Mexican professional wrestler. He is signed to All Elite Wrestling (AEW) and Consejo Mundial de Lucha Libre (CMLL), where is the current World Historic Welterweight Champion in his first reign and one-third of the CMLL World Trios Champions with Místico and Neón as El Sky Team. Dorada is also one-half of the ROH World Tag Team Champions with Místico. Dorada has also appeared in international promotions, including New Japan Pro-Wrestling (NJPW) and Revolution Pro Wrestling (RevPro), through CMLL’s partnerships.

A second-generation wrestler, he is the son of Panterita del Ring and the nephew of Luciferno. He began his career in 2021 under the ring name Panterita del Ring Jr., winning the Mexican National Lightweight Championship and the 2022 Torneo Gran Alternativa. In 2023, he adopted the ring name Máscara Dorada, previously used by Gran Metalik. He went on to win the 2023 and 2026 Leyenda de Plata, the World Historic Welterweight Championship, the 2024 and 2026 Universal Championship, and the CMLL World Trios Championship twice.

== Personal life ==
He was born on 22 May 2001 in Mexico City, the son of Panterita del Ring and the nephew of Luciferno. His cousin, El Rebelde, is also a wrestler. He began training in Olympic wrestling at the age of nine and became a national champion. However, he paused his Olympic training during the COVID-19 pandemic and began training for a career in professional wrestling.

== Professional wrestling career ==
His first documented match took place under the ring name Panterita del Ring Jr. on April 30, 2021 at Rey Bucanero's wrestling school in Ecatepec, where he defeated Angel Rosario.

=== Consejo Mundial de Lucha Libre (2021–present) ===
==== Panterita del Ring Jr. (2021–2023) ====
Panterita del Ring Jr. made his Consejo Mundial de Lucha Libre (CMLL) debut at Arena México on May 28, teaming with his father, Panterita del Ring, in the family-oriented Copa Dinastías ("Dynasties Cup") tournament. They were eliminated in the first round by Espíritu Negro and Rey Cometa. On December 10, he and his father participated in the Torneo Gran Alternativa ("Great Alternative Tournament"), an annual tournament that pairs younger wrestlers with veterans; they lost to El Coyote and Euforia in the first round. The next night, Panterita del Ring Jr. defeated Eléctrico to win the Mexican National Lightweight Championship. At Homenaje a Dos Leyendas ("Homage to Two Legends") on March 18, 2022, he, Cachorro and Suicida lost to Eléctrico, Halcón Suriano Jr. and Robin in the opening match. By virtue of holding a title, he entered the Universal Championship tournament, but lost to Virus in the first round on April 8. He also competed in the semi-finals of the Leyenda de Plata ("The Silver Legend") tournament on July 15, but was the third wrestler eliminated from the torneo cibernetico by Titán.

On December 16, Panterita del Ring Jr. was paired with Volador Jr. for that year's Torneo Gran Alternativa, defeating Arkalis and Atlantis in the first round and Suicida and Titán in the semi-finals. However, when Volador Jr. pulled out of the tournament after testing positive for COVID-19, he was replaced with Místico. The following week, they defeated Gran Guerrero and Raider in the finals to win the tournament. On January 27, 2023, he competed in the Reyes del Aire ("Kings of the Air") tournament, but was eliminated by eventual winner Dragón Rojo Jr. On April 14, he was part of a ten-way elimination match in the semi-finals of that year's Universal Championship tournament, where he was the last wrestler eliminated by Templario. In May, he vacated the Mexican National Lightweight Championship, ending his reign after 529 days. On June 27, he wrestled his final match as Panterita del Ring Jr., teaming with Atlantis and Místico to defeat Guerrero, Stuka Jr. and Templario.

==== Máscara Dorada (2023–present) ====
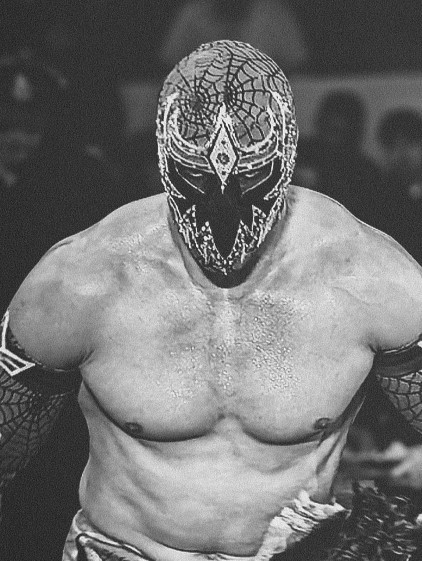
Dorada in 2025

On June 14, Panterita del Ring Jr. was repackaged as Máscara Dorada 2.0, a new version of the character previously used by Gran Metalik. In his first match as Dorada, he defeated El Desperado on June 30 at Fantastica Mania Mexico. On July 21, Dorada and Rocky Romero outlasted Dragón Rojo Jr., Metalik, Místico, Templario, Titán and Volador Jr. in a torneo cibernetico to face each other in the finals of the Leyenda de Plata the following week, where Dorada defeated Romero to become the youngest winner in the tournament's history. At the CMLL 90th Anniversary Show on September 16, he, Atlantis Jr. and Místico defeated Kevin Knight, Romero and TJP. At Noche de Campeones ("Night of Champions") on September 29, he unsuccessfully challenged Titán for the CMLL World Welterweight Championship. On December 15, Dorada defeated Romero to win the NWA World Historic Welterweight Championship. In early 2024, Dorada was paired with Neón for the Torneo Gran Alternativa, defeating Bárbaro Cavernario and Draego in the first round, Atlantis Jr. and Futuro in the quarter-finals and Max Star and Volador Jr. in the semi-finals, before losing in the finals to Brillante Jr. and Místico on February 2. Four days later, he competed in the Reyes del Aire, eliminating Zandokan Jr. before being eliminated by Templario.

Dorada and Romero were paired for the Torneo Nacional de Parejas Increíbles ("National Incredible Pairs Tournament") on March 15, forcing the rivals to team together. They defeated Ángel de Oro and Flip Gordon and Akuma and Dulce Gardenia en route to the finals at Homenaje a Dos Leyendas on March 29, which they won by defeating Atlantis Jr. and Soberano Jr. On April 26, Dorada defeated Magnus and Titán in a three-way elimination match to win the Universal Championship tournament. Dorada became a double champion on July 16, when he, Neón and Star Jr. defeated Los Bárbaros (Cavernario, Dragón Rojo Jr. and El Terrible) to win the CMLL World Trios Championship. On August 30, he defeated Akuma, Difunto, Neón, Star Black, Stuka Jr., Templario and Villano III Jr. to advance to the finals of the Copa Independencia ("Independence Cup") tournament at the CMLL 91st Anniversary Show on September 13, which he lost to Titán. Three days later, he unsuccessfully challenged Místico for the MLW World Middleweight Championship. At Noche de Campeones on September 27, Dorada, Neón and Star Jr. lost the titles to Los Infernales (Averno, Euforia and Mephisto).

In January 2025, Dorada, Místico and Neón formed a trio under the revived name El Sky Team, defeating Los Infernales on May 16 to reclaim the titles. Later that month, he lost to Zandokan Jr. in the finals of the La Copa Junior VIP ("The Junior VIP Cup") tournament. Dorada competed in that year's Leyenda de Plata, defeating Capitan Suicida in the first round and Templario in the semi-finals, before losing to Neón in the finals on July 25. At the CMLL 92nd Anniversary Show on September 19, they teamed with Atlantis Jr. to defeat Hechicero, Volador Jr. and Zandokan Jr. For the remainder of the year, Dorada successfully defended his NWA World Historic Welterweight Championship against Suicida at Noche de Campeones on September 26, Komander on November 23, and Mike Bailey on December 19. At Homenaje a Dos Leyendas on March 20, 2026, El Sky Team successfully defended the CMLL World Trios Championship against Death Riders (Daniel Garcia, Jon Moxley and Wheeler Yuta). On April 24, Dorada defeated Black Tiger and Hechicero in a three-way match to win the 2026 Universal Championship tournament. Three months later, he and Komander outlasted eight other wrestlers to advance to the Leyenda de Plata finals on July 31, where Dorada defeated Komander to win the tournament for a second time.

=== New Japan Pro-Wrestling (2023–present) ===
Dorada made his debut for New Japan Pro-Wrestling (NJPW) at Lonestar Shootout on November 10, 2023, teaming with Tiger Mask and Atlantis to defeat Hechicero, Rocky Romero and Último Guerrero. At Battle in the Valley on January 13, 2024, he and Volador Jr. defeated Romero and Soberano Jr. The following month, Dorada participated in the NJPW and CMLL co-promoted Fantastica Mania 2024 tour, where he teamed with and faced both CMLL and NJPW representatives. At Royal Quest IV in London on October 20, Dorada and The Mighty Don't Kneel (Robbie Eagles and Ryohei Oiwa) lost to Los Ingobernables de Japón (Hiromu Takahashi, Tetsuya Naito and Titán). In February 2026, during the Fantastica Mania 2026 tour, Dorada and Místico won a tag team tournament, defeating SHO and Guerrero in the first round, Los Viajeros Del Espacio (Futuro and Valiente Jr.) in the semi-finals, and Averno and Magnus in the finals.

=== All Elite Wrestling / Ring of Honor (2024–present) ===
In January 2024, it was announced Dorada, Hechicero, Místico and Volador Jr. would represent CMLL in American partner promotion All Elite Wrestling (AEW). The four men made their debut on the January 31 episode of Dynamite, appearing ringside during Jon Moxley's match against Jeff Hardy. After being taunted by Moxley during the match, the four men attacked him after his victory, before being chased off by Christopher Daniels, Matt Sydal, Angelo Parker and Matt Menard, whom they defeated in their AEW in-ring debut on the February 2 episode of Rampage.

On the May 28, 2025 episode of Collision, Dorada defeated Hechicero to qualify for the four-way match to challenge Kenny Omega for the AEW International Championship on June 4 at Dynamite: Fyter Fest, where he failed to win the title. On September 17, at Dynamite: September to Remember, Dorada defeated The Beast Mortos to advance to an AEW Unified Championship three-way match including Kazuchika Okada and Konosuke Takeshita at All Out on September 20, which he lost. On November 24, Dorada was announced as a participant in the 2025 Continental Classic, where he was placed in the Blue League. After victories over Claudio Castagnoli and Roderick Strong, Dorada finished the tournament with six points, failing to advance to the semi-finals. At Worlds End on September 27, he and ROH World Champion Bandido defeated Romero and Mark Davis of the Don Callis Family on Zero Hour.

In January 2026, Dorada announced on CMLL's weekly magazine show, Informa, that he had signed with AEW, while also keeping his contract with CMLL. He unsuccessfully challenged Jack Perry for the AEW National Championship on the May 2 episode of Collision. On June 26, Dorada and Místico defeated Sammy Guevara and The Beast Mortos to win the ROH World Tag Team Championship.

== Championships and accomplishments ==
Dorada is a one-time ROH World Tag Team Champion

- Consejo Mundial de Lucha Libre
  - CMLL Universal Championship (2024, 2026)
  - CMLL World Trios Championship (2 times, current) – with Star Jr. and Neón (1), and Místico and Neón (1, current)
  - Leyenda de Plata (2023, 2026)
  - Mexican National Lightweight Championship (1 time)
  - Torneo Gran Alternativa (2022) – with Místico
  - World Historic Welterweight Championship (1 time, current)
  - Torneo Nacional de Parejas Increibles (2024) – with Rocky Romero
- New Japan Pro-Wrestling
  - Fantastica Mania Tag Tournament (2026) – with Místico
- Pro Wrestling Illustrated
  - Ranked No. 23 of the top 500 singles wrestlers in the PWI 500 in 2025
- Ring of Honor
  - ROH World Tag Team Championship (1 time, current) – with Místico
- Wrestling Observer Newsletter
  - Best Flying Wrestler (2025)
