= Neón (wrestler) =

Mexican professional wrestler (born 1998)

Personal information
- Born: Unrevealed; October 27, 1998 (age 28) Mexico City, Mexico

Professional wrestling career
- Ring name(s): Neón; Prismatic
- Billed height: 1.75 m (5 ft 9 in)
- Billed weight: 90 kg (198 lb)
- Trained by: Arturo Beristain; Tony Salazar; Valiente; Volador Jr.

Neón (born October 25, 1998) is a Mexican professional wrestler. He is signed to Consejo Mundial de Lucha Libre (CMLL), where he is one-third of the CMLL World Trios Champions with Místico and Máscara Dorada as El Sky Team. His real name is not a matter of public record, as is often the case with masked wrestlers in Mexico, where their private lives are kept a secret from the wrestling fans.

Before joining CMLL, Neón wrestled under the ring name Prismatic. He has won the 2025 Reyes del Aire and Leyenda de Plata tournaments. Through CMLL's partnerships, he has also wrestled in the United Kingdom for Revolution Pro Wrestling (RevPro), where he is a former one-time Undisputed British Cruiserweight Champion, in Japan for New Japan Pro-Wrestling (NJPW), and in the United States for Major League Wrestling (MLW), Ring of Honor (ROH) and All Elite Wrestling (AEW).

== Early life ==
Neón was born in Mexico City, growing up in the Santa Júlia neighborhood. At the age of 3, his parents took him to a show at Arena México, which inspired him to become a professional wrestler. His parents were initially reluctant of the idea, believing he was too small. His sister called Consejo Mundial de Lucha Libre (CMLL)'s office and, after his parents signed a consent form, he began training at their school at the age of 14 under Arturo Beristain. At the same time, his mother required him to finish a professional degree first; he began training in his third year of middle school, and started wrestling by high school. After school, he would go to Arena México for training, carrying his uniform and school supplies on the subway. Due to financial issues that forced him to enter the subway without paying, he often jumped turnstiles from Tacuba to Neza stations to get there.

== Professional wrestling career ==
He made his professional wrestling debut at the age of 16 under the ring name Prismatic, initially working at fairs, government events and small markets.

=== Consejo Mundial de Lucha Libre (2022–present) ===
==== Early years (2022–2025) ====
Neón made his CMLL in-ring debut on July 2, 2022, as he, Panterita del Ring Jr. and Valiente Jr. faced El Cholo, Inquisidor and Raider in a six-man tag team match. Prior to his debut, he fractured his arm, but rehabilitated with the support of another one of his trainers, Valiente. On December 16, he was paired with Stuka Jr. in the Torneo Gran Alternativa ("Great Alternative Tournament"), which pairs a rookie with a veteran, but lost to Halcón Suriano Jr. and Soberano Jr. in the first round. At Sin Salida ("No Escape") on January 1, 2023, Neón was one of twelve wrestlers risking their mask in a steel cage match, held under Lucha de Apuestas ("bet match") rules. He was the seventh wrestler to escape the cage, watching as Valiente Jr. unmasked Apocalipsis. The following month, he represented Mexico City in the Torneo de Escuelas ("Schools Tournament"), where CMLL trainees from Mexico City, Puebla, Guadalajara and Comarca Lagunera competed against each other in a series of multi-man matches. Neón's team defeated the Comarca Lagunera team in the first round on February 24, but lost to the Guadalajara team in the finals on March 3. On October 13, he and Futuro unsuccessfully challenged Los Depredadores ("The Predators"; Magnus and Rugido) for the Mexican National Tag Team Championship.

For the following year's Torneo Gran Alternativa on January 26, 2024, Neón was partnered with Máscara Dorada, defeating Bárbaro Cavernario and Draego in the first round, Atlantis Jr. and Futuro in the quarter-finals and Max Star and Volador Jr. in the semi-finals, before losing in the finals to Brillante Jr. and Místico on February 2. At Homenaje a Dos Leyendas ("Homage to Two Legends") on March 29, he and Brillante Jr. failed to win the title from Los Depredadores. On June 24, he unsuccessfully challenged Guerrero Maya Jr. for the Mexican National Middleweight Championship. On July 16, Neón, Dorada and Star Jr. defeated Los Bárbaros ("The Barbarians"; Cavernario, Dragón Rojo Jr. and El Terrible) to win the CMLL World Trios Championship. Three days later, he lost to Místico in the first round of the Leyenda de Plata ("The Silver Legend") tournament. On August 30, he competed in the semi-final torneo cibernetico of the Copa Independencia ("Independence Cup") tournament, where he eliminated Villano III Jr. before being eliminated near the end by Dorada. At the CMLL 90th Anniversary Show on September 13, he, Star Jr. and Templario lost to Los Hermanos Chavez (Ángel de Oro and Niebla Roja) and Soberano Jr. At Noche de Campeones ("Night of Champions") on September 27, Neón, Dorada and Star Jr. lost the title to Los Infernales ("The Infernals"; Averno, Euforia and Mephisto).

==== El Sky Team (2025–present) ====
In January 2025, Neón, Dorada and Místico formed a trio known as El Sky Team. On February 3, he and Flip Gordon unsuccessfully challenged Los Hermanos Chavez for the CMLL World Tag Team Championship. The next night, Neón outlasted Ángel de Oro, Brillante Jr., Capitan Suicida, Dragón Rojo Jr., Futuro, Max Star, Místico, Stuka Jr., Templario, Titán and Valiente Jr. to win the Reyes del Aire ("Kings of the Air") tournament. On May 16, El Sky Team defeated Los Infernales for the CMLL World Trios Championship. Neón entered that year's Leyenda de Plata on July 18, defeating Max Star in the first round and Titán in the semi-finals. The following week, on July 25, he defeated Dorada in the finals to win the tournament. At the CMLL 92nd Anniversary Show on September 19, they teamed with Atlantis Jr. to defeat Hechicero, Volador Jr. and Zandokan Jr. On December 5, Neón was injured while attemping his signature double jump moonsault, as he slipped on the third rope and fell hard onto the ringside floor, leading to medical personnel stretchering him out of the arena.

Neón returned from injury on January 30, 2026. On February 3, he competed in that year's Reyes del Aire, which was won by Gordon. At Homenaje a Dos Leyendas on March 20, El Sky Team successfully defended the CMLL World Trios Championship against Death Riders (Daniel Garcia, Jon Moxley and Wheeler Yuta). On April 10, Neón competed in the seven-way semi-finals of the champion-designated Universal Championship tournament, but was eliminated by Ángel de Oro. He also took part in the semi-finals of the Leyenda de Plata on July 24, eliminating Guerrero Maya Jr. before being eliminated by Templario.

=== Revolution Pro Wrestling (2024) ===
On May 19, 2024, Neón debuted for Revolution Pro Wrestling (RevPro) on Fantastica Mania: UK show 1, teaming with Dorada and Futuro in a loss to Grizzled Young Veterans (James Drake and Zack Gibson) and Luke Jacobs. That same day, on the second Fantastica Mania: UK show, Neón defeated Jordon Breaks to win the Undisputed British Cruiserweight Championship, his first title in his career, but lost it in a six-way match to Will Kaven on August 24 at the RevPro 12th Anniversary Show.

=== New Japan Pro-Wrestling (2025–present) ===
In February 2025, Neón made his debut for New Japan Pro-Wrestling (NJPW) as part of the Fantastica Mania 2025 tour, a series of shows co-promoted by NJPW and CMLL.

=== All Elite Wrestling (2025) ===
Neón made his debut for All Elite Wrestling (AEW) on the November 22, 2025 episode of Collision, as El Sky Team successfully defended the CMLL World Trios Championship against the Don Callis Family (Hechicero, Kazuchika Okada and Konosuke Takeshita).

== Championships and accomplishments ==
- Consejo Mundial de Lucha Libre
  - CMLL World Trios Championship (2 times, current) – with Star Jr. and Máscara Dorada (1) and Máscara Dorada and Místico (1, current)
  - Leyenda de Plata (2025)
  - Reyes del Aire (2025)
  - Embajador de los Ninos (2024)
  - Espectacular Torneo de Tercias (2026) - with Alexius and Pendulo
- Pro Wrestling Illustrated
  - Ranked No. 68 of the top 500 singles wrestlers in the PWI 500 in 2025
- Revolution Pro Wrestling
  - Undisputed British Cruiserweight Championship (1 time)
