= Futuro (wrestler) =

Mexican professional wrestler

Personal information
- Born: Unrevealed; 2002 (age 23–24) Mexico City

Professional wrestling career
- Ring name: Futuro
- Billed height: 1.70 m (5 ft 7 in)
- Billed weight: 75 kg (165 lb)
- Trained by: Arturo Beristain; Jaque Mate
- Debut: September 2018

Futuro (born 2002) is a Mexican professional wrestler signed to Consejo Mundial de Lucha Libre (CMLL), where he is a member of the Los Viajeros del Espacio ("The Space Travelers") stable. He also makes appearances for partner promotion New Japan Pro-Wrestling (NJPW). He is a former Mexican National Lightweight Champion and Mexican National Trios Champion. His real name is not a matter of public record, as is often the case with masked wrestlers in Mexico, where their private lives are kept a secret from the wrestling fans.

== Professional wrestling career ==
=== Early career (2018–2023) ===
Growing up, Futuro joined a lucha olímpica ("freestyle wrestling") club, where he became a national champion and competed internationally. He entered professional wrestling through his uncle, Tony Aguirre, training under Jaque Mate and Arturo Beristain by the age of 16, before making his debut in September 2018. One of his earliest high profile matches saw him defeat Blue Monsther Jr., Corono de Fuego, Eurus, Farsante, Iron Kid, Mexica, Tempo and Magico in a nine-way match on December 25, 2019, to win Mi Sagrada Lucha Libre (MSLL)'s Copa Celeste. On December 29, 2021, at their Noche de Campeones ("Night of Champions") event, Futuro defeated Yoruba and Nygma in a three-way match to win the MSLL Celeste Championship, which he lost to Perseo on May 14, 2022. Futuro appeared for International Wrestling Revolution Group (IWRG) on December 18, representing MSLL in a four-way tag team match, which his team was unsuccessful in winning.

=== Consejo Mundial de Lucha Libre (2023–present) ===
==== Early years (2023–2024) ====
Futuro made a one-off appearance for Consejo Mundial de Lucha Libre (CMLL) on May 25, 2021, teaming with Yutani to defeat Adrenalina and Estrella Orienta. He returned in early 2023 to represent Mexico City in the Torneo de Escuelas ("Schools Tournament"), where CMLL trainees from Mexico City, Puebla, Guadalajara and Comarca Lagunera competed against each other in a series of multi-man matches. Futuro's team defeated the Comarca Lagunera team in the first round on February 24, but lost to the Guadalajara team in the finals on March 3.

On July 23, Futuro competed in a tournament to crown a new Mexican National Lightweight Champion, which featured various wrestlers representing Guadalajara, Mexico City, Puebla and Comarca Lagunera. He and Max Star outlasted Astral, Diamond, Halcón Suriano Jr., Inquisidor, Neón and Oro Jr. in a torneo cibernetico to advance to the finals. The following week, on July 30, Futuro lastly eliminated Brillante Jr. in another torneo cibernetico to become the new champion. On September 1, Futuro competed in the semi-final torneo cibernetico of the Copa Independencia ("Independence Cup") tournament, but was the fourth wrestler eliminated by Magnus. He and Neón unsuccessfully challenged Los Depredadores ("The Predators"; Magnus and Rugido) for the Mexican National Tag Team Championship on October 13. On January 26, 2024, Futuro was paired with Atlantis Jr. for the Torneo Gran Alternativa ("Great Alternative Tournament"), which pairs a rookie with a more experienced wrestler. They defeated Averno and Guerrero de la Muerte in the first round, but lost to Máscara Dorada and Neón in the quarter-finals. For holding a championship, Futuro participated in the Universal Championship tournament's semi-final torneo cibernetico on April 5, where he eliminated Cholo before being eliminated by Esfinge.

==== Los Viajeros del Espacio (2024–present) ====
During this time, Futuro began teaming with Max Star and Neón to form the stable Los Viajeros del Espacio ("The Space Travelers"); he and Max Star, alongside Hombre Bala Jr., defeated Los Indestructibles ("The Indestructibles"; Apocalipsis, Cholo and Disturbio) for the Mexican National Trios Championship on July 9. Three days later, he lost to Flip Gordon in the first round of the Leyenda de Plata ("The Silver Legend") tournament. Futuro wrestled in the opening match of the CMLL 91st Anniversary Show on September 13, as Los Viajeros del Espacio defeated Magia Blanca, Magnus and Rugido. In the main event of Noche de Campeones ("Night of Champions") on September 27, Futuro lost the Mexican National Lightweight Championship to Rayo Metálico. On February 4, 2025, Futuro competed in the Reyes del Aire ("Kings of the Air") tournament, but was the second wrestler eliminated by Titán. In that year's Universal Championship tournament, he and Max Star lost in the first round to Los Infernales ("The Infernals"; Euforia and Mephisto) on April 11. Later that month, Futuro won an eight-man torneo cibernetico for the Campeonato Embajador de los Ninos ("Children's Ambassador Championship"), last eliminating Max Star. Los Viajeros del Espacio lost the Mexican National Trios Championship to El Cobarde, Felino Jr. and Hijo de Stuka Jr. on June 16. For that year's Torneo Gran Alternativa on December 12, Futuro and Esfinge defeated Explosivo and Titán in the first round, but lost to Ángel de Oro and Yutani in the semi-finals.

Futuro was a participant in the inaugural torneo cibernetico for the Copa Daniel García ("Daniel García Cup"), held in honor of Huracán Ramírez, on September 20, 2026, being eliminated by Valiente Jr. after 19 minutes of wrestling. At Noche de Campeones five days later, he and Max Star unsuccessfully challenged Los Depredadores for the Mexican National Tag Team Championship.

=== New Japan Pro-Wrestling (2026–present) ===
Futuro made his debut for New Japan Pro-Wrestling (NJPW) in February 2026 as part of the Fantastica Mania 2026 tour, co-produced by NJPW and CMLL. He and Valiente Jr. participated in a tag team tournament, defeating Hijo de Stuka Jr. and Shoma Kato in the first round before losing to El Sky Team (Dorada and Místico) in the semi-finals.

== Championships and accomplishments ==
- Consejo Mundial de Lucha Libre
  - Mexican National Lightweight Championship (1 time)
  - Mexican National Trios Championship (1 time) – with Max Star and Hombre Bala Jr.
  - Embajador de los Ninos (2025)
- Mi Sagrada Lucha Libre
  - MSLL Celeste Championship (1 time)
  - Copa Celeste (2019)
