= Valiente (wrestler) =

Mexican professional wrestler

Personal information
- Born: Fernando Vega; May 30, 1974 (age 52) Guadalajara, Jalisco, Mexico
- Family: Valiente Jr. (son); Hera (daughter); Olympia (daughter); Hijo de Valiente (nephew)

Professional wrestling career
- Ring name: Valiente
- Billed height: 1.70 m (5 ft 7 in)
- Billed weight: 92 kg (203 lb)
- Billed from: Mexico City, Mexico
- Trained by: Fuerza Aerea; Hijo del Gladiador; Guerrero del Futuro; Franco Colombo
- Debut: May 30, 1996

Fernando Vega, best known as Valiente (Spanish for "Valiant"; born May 30, 1974) is a Mexican professional wrestler, and is mainly known for his work in the Mexican promotion Consejo Mundial de Lucha Libre (CMLL). He won the 2008 and the 2012 Reyes del Aire tournaments and is a former Mexican National Welterweight and CMLL World Trios Champion.

== Professional wrestling career ==
Valiente made his debut in 1996, working on the Mexican independent circuit. After not making much headway Valiente actually retired from professional wrestling in the late 1990s. After almost five years away from the ring Valiente returned to wrestling in the early 2000s, hoping to make a name for himself. His ring name Valiente is Spanish for "Valiant", which is expressed by the sword icon on his mask.

=== Consejo Mundial de Lucha Libre (2005–present) ===
By 2005, Valiente began working regularly for Consejo Mundial de Lucha Libre (CMLL) while also training under Hijo del Gladiador and Guerrero del Futuro to hone his skills. Valiente worked as a low to mid-card wrestler, a high flying tecnico ("good guy" or face character) whose high risk moves contradicted his short, overweight stature. Valiente took part in the 2006 Reyes del Aire (Spanish for "Kings of the Air") tournament, unfortunately he was the first wrestler eliminated. Valiente also participated in the Reyes del Aire in 2007, eliminating Super Nova, before being eliminated himself. Valiente also earned a spot at that year's Anniversary show, teaming with Métalico and Stuka Jr. to defeat Los Infernales (Euforia and Nosferatu) and Loco Max, with Valiente making the winning pin on Euforia.

After participating in all previous Reyes del Aire except the first one, the 2008 tournament was finally Valiente's year to shine as he outlasted Loco Max, Stuka Jr., Virus, Flash, Diamante Negro, Máscara Purpura, Euforia, Ephesto, Volador Jr., Mr. Águila, La Máscara, Misterioso Jr., La Sombra and Sangre Azteca. A month later, Valiente worked CMLL's Infierno en el Ring event, teaming with Rocky Romero and El Sagrado losing to Averno, Mephisto, and Ephesto. 2008 turned out to be Valiente's "breakthrough" year, winning Reyes del Aire and making several major show appearances. He even competed in the Leyenda de Azul tournament on December 12, 2008, but did not win. After a hiatus, Valiente returned in mid-2009. On August 16, 2009, Valiente defeated Sangre Azteca for the Mexican National Welterweight Championship, his first wrestling title. By virtue of holding the Mexican National Welterweight Championship Valiente participated in the 2010 Universal Championship tournament. He was part of "Block B" that competed on the August 6, 2010 Super Viernes show where he was eliminated from the tournament when he lost to Volador Jr. in the first round. On July 15, 2011, Valiente lost the Mexican National Welterweight Championship to Pólvora, ending his reign at 698 days. On November 24, 2011, Valiente won CMLL's annual Bodybuilding Contest and was as a result granted the nickname of "Mr. CMLL". On August 15, 2012, Valiente won the second Reyes del Aire tournament that CMLL held in 2012, lastly eliminating Dragón Rojo Jr. by disqualification. In late 2012 and early 2013, Valiente worked a series of matches against Pólvora, building to a title match between the two as they fought for Pólvora's CMLL World Welterweight Championship. The match took place on February 2, 2013, and saw Pólvora retain the championship. In March 2013 Pólvora and Valiente were teamed up for the 2013 Torneo Nacional de Parejas Increibles ("National Incredible Pairs Tournament") a tag team tournament where the concept was that rivals would be forced to work together to win the tournament. While the two managed to work together they still lost their first round match to the team of Atlantis and Último Guerrero. In March 2013, Valiente was announced as participating in the 2013 En Busca de un Ídolo ("In search of an Idol") tournament that would take place from May to July 2013 as one of eight competitors. He made it all the way to the finals of the tournament on July 12, before losing to Vangelis. Meanwhile, Valiente also formed the Los Estetas del Aire ("Air Aesthetes") stable with Máscara Dorada and Místico, with whom he went on to win the CMLL World Trios Championship on June 16. After Dorada's departure from CMLL in early 2015, Valiente and Místico formed the Sky Team stable with Volador Jr., winning the CMLL World Trios Championship on February 13. At Homenaje a Dos Leyendas, Volador Jr. and Valiente defeated El Terrible and Rey Bucanero to win the CMLL World Tag Team Championship.

At CMLL's 92 Aniversario on September 19, 2025, he lost his mask against Esfinge.

=== Appearances outside CMLL ===
Valiente was scheduled to make his first appearance for the Philadelphia, Pennsylvania based Chikara as part of the 2010 King of Trios tournament that ran from April 23 – 25 at The Arena in Philadelphia. Valiente was to team with Skayde and Turbo to form "Team Mexico". Their first round opponents were scheduled to be Die Bruderschaft des Kreuzes (Claudio Castagnoli, Ares and Tursas), Chikara's top heel group at the time. However, on April 22, Chikara announced that they no longer expected Valiente to honor his commitment with the company, after he stopped returning their phone calls and didn't board his flight to Philadelphia. Doubts later arose if Skayde ever actually contacted Valiente about arranging the booking or not. In April 2010, it was announced that Valiente and Máscara Dorada would travel to Japan in early May to participate in New Japan Pro-Wrestling's first ever Super J Tag Team tournament. In the first round of the tournament they lost to former IWGP Junior Heavyweight Tag Team Champions Ryusuke Taguchi and Prince Devitt in just under eight minutes. On January 4, 2012, Valiente returned to New Japan at Wrestle Kingdom VI, where he teamed with Atlantis, Taichi and Taka Michinoku in an eight-man tag team match, where they were defeated by Jushin Thunder Liger, Kushida, Máscara Dorada and Tiger Mask. On April 7, 2013, Valiente returned to New Japan Pro-Wrestling at Invasion Attack, where he and La Máscara unsuccessfully challenged Tama Tonga and El Terrible for the CMLL World Tag Team Championship. Valiente returned to New Japan on October 25, when he and Bushi entered the 2013 Super Jr. Tag Tournament, defeating Kushida and Yohei Komatsu in their first round match. They were eliminated from the tournament in the semifinals on November 6 by the Forever Hooligans (Alex Koslov and Rocky Romero).

== Personal life ==
Around 2009, some of Valiente's family members asked him for permission to use his ring name, which is not uncommon in lucha libre. These luchador enmáscarados did not garner much success, so Valiente took the name back. His children also followed him into professional wrestling: his daughter Hera debuted in 2019, his son Valiente Jr. debuted in 2020 and another daughter Miss Olympia debuted in 2022.

== Championships and accomplishments ==
- Consejo Mundial de Lucha Libre

- CMLL Universal Championship tournament (2016)
- CMLL World Tag Team Championship (2 times) - with Volador Jr., Diamante Azul
- CMLL World Trios Championship (2 times) – with Máscara Dorada and Místico (1), and Místico and Volador Jr. (1)
- Mexican National Welterweight Championship (1 time)
- Reyes del Aire: (2008, 2012)
- Gran Alternativa tournament (2019) – with Star Jr.
- CMLL Bodybuilding Contest – Advanced (2011, 2016)

- Pro Wrestling Illustrated
  - Ranked No. 275 of the top 500 singles wrestlers in the PWI 500 in 2019

== Luchas de Apuestas record ==
Winner (wager)	Loser (wager)	Location	Event	Date	Notes
Valiente (mask)	Explosion 2000 (mask)	Aguascalientes, Aguascalientes	Martes de Coliseo	January 11, 2007	(Note: Steel Cage match that also included Volador Jr., Rey Bucanero, Marco Corleone, El Hijo del Diablo, Tony Rivera)
Valiente (mask)	Sergio Romo Jr. (hair)	Monterrey, Nuevo León	Live event	March 12, 2008	(Note: Four-way match that also included Tigre Universitario and Rey Hechicero)
Valiente (mask)	Rey Pantera (hair)	Xalapa, Veracruz	Lucha Libre Radioactiva Segundo Aniversario	June 27, 2024	
Esfinge (mask)	Valiente (mask)	Mexico City, Mexico	CMLL 92nd Anniversary Show	September 19, 2025	(Note: Last two participants in a three-way Eliminatorio Parejas Increíbles involving Averno and Último Guerrero and Dragon Rojo Jr. and Bárbaro Cavernario.)
