= Brillante Jr. =

Mexican professional wrestler

Personal information
- Born: Unrevealed; 28 March 2001 (age 25) Gómez Palacio, Durango, Mexico
- Relatives: El Moro (great-grandfather); Moro III (uncle); Zafiro (uncle); Espanto Jr. (uncle); Andrade El Idolo (cousin); Espanto Jr. (II) (cousin); Lady Shadow (sister)

Professional wrestling career
- Billed height: 1.80 m (5 ft 11 in)
- Billed weight: 83 kg (183 lb)
- Trained by: Moro III; Cavernario de Torreón; Halcón Suriano Jr. Virus; Último Guerrero
- Debut: March 29, 2015

Brillante Jr. (born 28 March 2001) is the ring name of a Mexican professional wrestler. He works for promotion Consejo Mundial de Lucha Libre (CMLL). His real name is not a matter of public record, as is often the case with masked wrestlers in Mexico where their private lives are kept a secret from the wrestling fans.

== Family ==
Born in Gómez Palacio, Brillante Jr. is a cousin of Andrade El Idolo. He recalls training together with Andrade when he was only four years old.

He is part of the third generation of the Andrade/El Moro family to compete in Mexican professional wrestling style know as lucha libre. His great-grandfather, José Andrade, wrestled under the name "El Moro", while his uncles wrestle or wrestled under the names Diamante/Moro III (Sergio Andrade), Zafiro/Pentagoncito/Espiritu Magico (Juan Andrade), Kevin (Juan Andrade), Espanto Jr./Pentagón (Jesús Andrade), and another one of his cousins works as the current Espanto Jr. His sister Lady Shadow, also wrestles in CMLL. His own father, however, was never a wrestler.

== Career ==
=== Early career ===
This Brillante Jr. made his debut in March 2015 in Arena Azteca, with a mask very much resembling that of La Sombra, Andrade El Idolo's old identity. Before becoming La Sombra, Andrade El Idolo also used the name Brillante Jr. back in the mid-2000s. Brillante Jr. wrestled locally in the Comarca Lagunera area for over five years, steadily improving and moving up the cards. He established himself as a top aerial wrestler in the area, and soon rose to the top of the cards of the local shows.

In 2019, he worked a match for Pro Wrestling Mexico in Monterrey, a promotion then co-owned by Lucha Libre AAA Worldwide. Teaming with Kratoz and Último Maldito, they were defeated by the team of Komander, Dulce Canela and Baby Xtreme. On 27 March 2022, he worked a dark match for AAA in Torreón.

=== Consejo Mundial de Lucha Libre (2023–present) ===
Brillante Jr.'s move to Consejo Mundial de Lucha Libre and Mexico City came when he was invited to participate for the Comarca Lagunera team in CMLL's new Torneo de Escuelas tournament, where the CMLL trainees from Mexico City, Puebla, Guadalajara and La Laguna competed against each other in a series of multi-man matches. The tournament took place in February and March 2023. Brillante Jr. and his teammates lost to the Mexico City team in the first round. However, Brillante Jr. has since established himself as a main roster member in CMLL, working the opening matches both in Arena México and Arena Coliseo, as well as in Guadalajara and Puebla. He has also relocated to the Mexico City area. He portrays a tecnico ("Good guy") wrestling character.

On 4 April, Brillante Jr. wrestled in the Torneo Nueva Generación, a showcase multi-man match at the Arena Coliseo 80th Anniversary show, which marked his first appearance on a major CMLL show. Brillante Jr. was the fifth out of ten to be eliminated, by Rey Samuray, who went on to win the match. On 23 June, Brillante Jr. wrestled for the first time on Viernes Espectaculares or Super Friday, which is CMLLs main show of the week. Together with Neón and Max Star, his team defeated Capitán Suicida, Fuego and Valiente Jr. in the second match of the night.

After winning a qualifier in Torreón, together with Misterio Blanco, Brillante Jr. participated in a multi-man elimination match to crown a new Mexican National Lightweight Champion on 30 July. Brillante Jr. survived until the final two, but eventually lost to Futuro, who became the new champion. The concept of the tournament was that two wrestlers from Guadalajara, Mexico City, Puebla and Laguna respectively competed for the title.

In November 2023, he was selected as part of the CMLL roster for Fantastica Mania 2024 with New Japan Pro Wrestling (NJPW), marking his Japanese debut. On the tour, whch was held in February 2024, Brillante Jr. was mostly used in six-man tag team matches, but did have a singles match, where he was defeated by Titán. From January to February 2024, Brillante Jr. participated in the Torneo Gran Alternativa, alongside Místico; they would go on to defeat Neón and Máscara Dorada in the final.

== Championships and accomplishments ==
- Consejo Mundial de Lucha Libre
  - Torneo Gran Alternativa (January/February 2024) – with Místico
  - Copa Daniel Garcia (2026)
