= Rayo Metálico =

Mexican professional wrestler (born 1998)

Personal information
- Born: Unrevealed; May 1, 1998 (age 28) León, Guanajuato, Mexico
- Family: Panchito Robles Jr. (father); Panchito Robles (grandfather); Stigma, Skandalo, La Briosa, Black Cat (cousins); Sugi Sito, Huroki Sito, Manuel Robles (granduncles)

Professional wrestling career
- Ring name: Rayo Metálico
- Billed height: 1.66 m (5 ft 5 1/2 in)
- Billed weight: 65 kg (143 lb)
- Trained by: Pancho Robles Jr.; Indio Nacoma; Crazy Star; Prayer
- Debut: 2015

Rayo Metálico (born May 1, 1998) is a Mexican professional wrestler working for the Mexican promotion Consejo Mundial de Lucha Libre (CMLL). His real name is not a matter of public record, as is often the case with masked wrestlers in Mexico where their private lives are kept a secret from the wrestling fans. Rayo Metálico is a former Mexican National Lightweight Champion. Metalico is the son of luchador Panchito Robles Jr., making him part of the Mar family. He is thus the second cousin of Stigma and Skandalo, a cousin once-removed of La Briosa and Black Cat, and a grandnephew of Sugi Sito.

== Career ==
After winning a qualifier in Puebla, together with Meyer, Rayo Metálico participated in a multi-man elimination match to crown a new Mexican National Lightweight Champion on 30 July 2023, which was won by Futuro, who became the new champion. The concept of the tournament was that two wrestlers from Guadalajara, Mexico City, Puebla and Laguna respectively competed for the title.

In February 2024, Rayo Metálico took part in the Torneo de Escuelas tournament, where the CMLL trainees from Mexico City, Puebla, Guadalajara and Comarca Lagunera competed against each other in a series of multi-man matches. He and his Puebla team reached the final where they lost to the Mexico City team. On September 27, 2024, at CMLL Noche de Campeones, Rayo Metálico defeated Futuro to win the Mexican National Lightweight Championship. He was not given an opportunity to defend it until 18 months later on March 23, 2026, where he lost the title to Calavera Jr. I in his family's home-base Arena Puebla, (shortly after his family were replaced as CMLL's promoters for the Puebla region).

== Championships and accomplishments ==
- Consejo Mundial de Lucha Libre
  - Mexican National Lightweight Championship (1 time) (Note: The Mexican National Lightweight Championship is sanctioned by the Mexico City wrestling commission but under the control of CMLL who make the day to day decisions.)
