= Arkalis =

Mexican professional wrestler

Personal information
- Born: Unrevealed; Unknown San Martín Texmelucan, Puebla

Professional wrestling career
- Ring name: Arkalis
- Billed height: 1.68 m (5 ft 6 in)
- Billed weight: 94 kg (207 lb)
- Trained by: El Malayo; Centella de Oro; Black Tiger; Virus; Último Guerrero
- Debut: July 26, 2010

Arkalis (born July 17, unknown year in San Martín Texmelucan, Puebla) is a Mexican professional wrestler currently working for the promotion Consejo Mundial de Lucha Libre (CMLL) portraying a tecnico ("Good guy") wrestling character. His real name is not a matter of public record, as is often the case with masked wrestlers in Mexico where their private lives are kept a secret from the wrestling fans.

His nicknames are Chamaco de Oro and Hombre de Retos.

== Career ==
After being trained in Consejo Mundial de Lucha Libres school in Arena Puebla, Arkalis first recorded match under that name happened in June 2014. However, in a 2023 interview, Arkalis stated that he had 15 years of wrestling experience, so it is likely that he either worked smaller undocumented shows previously or worked under a different name in his earlier career. In interviews he stated he would be paid as little as 50 pesos for his first matches.

For a couple of months during the summer of 2014 he worked smaller shows in Puebla state before he made his official debut with CMLL on September 16, 2014. Until 2018 he only worked for CMLL in Arena Puebla, as well as on the independent circuit. However, in mid 2018 he started working in Mexico City, in Arena México and Arena Coliseo and became officially a part of the CMLL roster.

Since moving to Mexico City, Arkalis is a part of the Fuerza Poblana faction together with fellow Puebla wrestlers Guerrero Maya Jr., Stigma, Pegasso and Rey Samuray. The unit often works in the midcard of CMLL shows and has challenged for the Mexican National Trios Championship in May 2022 but was unsuccessful.

== Luchas de Apuestas record ==
Winner (wager)	Loser (wager)	Location	Event	Date	Notes
Arkalis (mask)	El Malayo (mask)	Puebla, Puebla	Arena Puebla 73rd Anniversary Show	July 20, 2026	

== Championships and accomplishments ==
- Consejo Mundial de Lucha Libre
  - Reyes del Aire Puebla - 2024
