= Los Guerreros Laguneros =

Professional wrestling stable

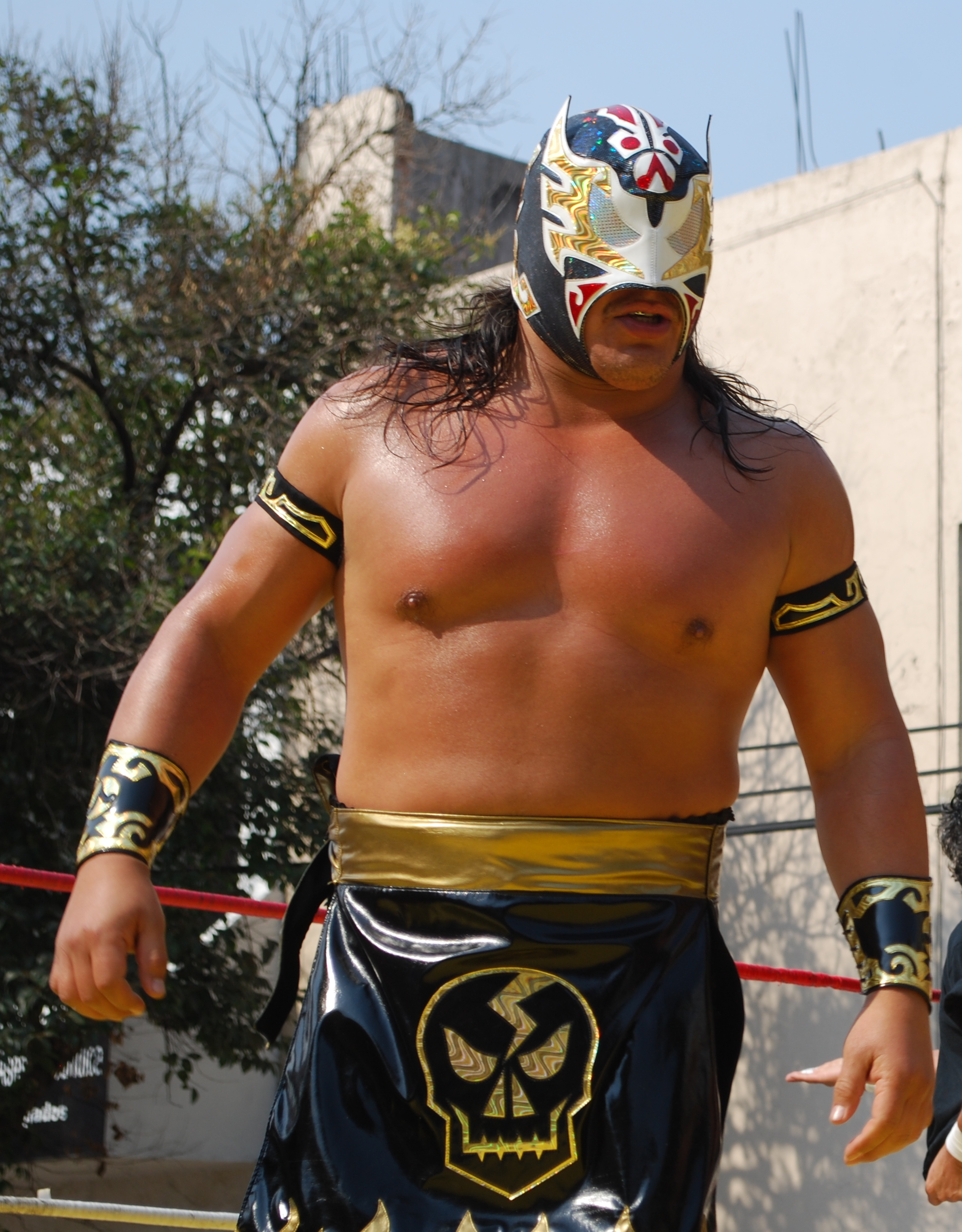
- Último Guerrero, leader and founder of Los Guerreros Laguneros

Stable
- Members: Último Guerrero (leader); Gran Guerrero; Stuka Jr.
- Name(s): Los Infernales; Los Guerreros del Infierno; Los Guerreros de la Atlantida; Los Guerreros Laguneros
- Former members: See below
- Debut: 2001

Los Guerreros Laguneros (Spanish for "The Warriors from the Lagoon") is a professional wrestling stable based in Consejo Mundial de Lucha Libre (CMLL). The stable was created in 2001 and has, since its inception, been led by Último Guerrero and has been the top rudo ("heel") stable in CMLL. Los Guerreros Laguneros currently consists of Último Guerrero, his younger brother Gran Guerrero and Stuka Jr.

The group originally was created as a splinter group of Los Infernales founded by Último Guerrero, Rey Bucanero and Tarzan Boy. The group initially used the "Los Infernales" name until they were forced to change their name in 2001. At that point the group adopted the name Los Guerreros del Infierno ("The Infernal Warriors"). When Atlantis joined the group in 2005 they adopted the name Los Guerreros de la Atlantida ("The Warriors of Atlantis"), which was used interchangeably with the "Guerreros del Infierno" name. In 2011 Atlantis departed the group and it was renamed Los Guerreros Laguneros, referring to the fact that all members of the group were from the Comarca Lagunera area of Mexico. Since its inception various members of the team have held the CMLL World Tag Team Championship and the CMLL World Trios Championship as well as several individual championships. From 2004 until 2007 Los Guerreros were associated with Pandilla Guerrera ("Gang of Warriors"), a lower ranked group of wrestlers.

== Group history ==
=== Los Infernales (2001) ===
In 1999 El Satánico reformed the group Los Infernales, recruiting Último Guerrero and Rey Bucanero; Bucanero's uncle Pirata Morgan had been part of the original Los Infernales. Working with the veteran El Satánico allowed both Rey Bucanero and Último Guerrero to rise up the ranks as well as develop into a regular tag team in CMLL. In the summer of 2000 Bucanero and Guerrero were one of sixteen teams entered into a tournament for the vacant CMLL World Tag Team Championship. In the end they defeated Villano IV and Mr. Niebla to win the championship.

Throughout the summer of 2000 El Satánico had been working a storyline against Tarzan Boy, which was used to turn both Bucanero and Último Guerrero against El Satánico. Bucanero, Guerrero and Tarzan Boy claimed that they deserved the name Los Infernales and that El Satánico was holding them back. For the storyline El Satánico recruited two other wrestlers to even the numbers, which on TV was presented as if he used his "Satanic powers" to transform Rencor Latino into Averno ("Hell") and Astro Rey Jr. into Mephisto. When Tarzan Boy was injured and unable to wrestle Bucanero and Guerrero recruited Máscara Mágica to even the numbers. The storyline between the two factions reaches its high point at the CMLL 68th Anniversary Show where all seven wrestlers faced off in a steel cage match. The stipulation of the match was that the winning side would gain the rights to use the name Los Infernales while the loser on the opposite side would be forced to unmask or have their hair shaved off. In the end El Satánico pinned Máscara Mágica, forcing him to unmask. After losing the match Guerrero, Bucanero and Tarzan Boy became known collectively as Los Guerreros del Infierno ("The Infernal Soldiers").

=== Los Guerreros del Infierno (2001–2005) ===
Finally, Satánico's Infernales retained their name and the name Guerreros del Infierno was adopted by Guerrero, Bucanero and Tarzan Boy. Soon GdI was the powerful rudo trio in CMLL. Bucanero and Guerrero successfully took the Tag Team Titles from the respected veterans Negro Casas and El Hijo del Santo. Último was successful in taking the CMLL Light Heavyweight Title (the most prestigious singles title in the promotion) by defeating Shocker. Tarzan Boy went on to main event the CMLL 70th Anniversary Show against Shocker in a Caballera contra Caballera match. Tarzan lost the match and his hair.

2004 was a tough year for the Guerreros. Guerrero and Bucanero lost and then regained the tag titles from L. A. Park and Shocker. Then Bucanero suffered a knee injury when his leg was caught in a seat and he was hit by a dive. Tarzan began teaming with Pierroth Jr. and Vampiro Canadiense to create a new top (in CMLL's eyes at least) heel trio. When Bucanero returned, they quickly lost the tag titles to Atlantis and Blue Panther. Tarzan soon started teaming with yet another trio called La Furia del Norte with Héctor Garza and Perro Aguayo Jr. (who was later replaced by El Terrible). It was then that Último Guerrero raised an army of mid carders to counter Shocker's University de 1000% Guapo group and the two groups faced in a Torneo Cibernético. Olimpíco won the match for Los Guerreros and was considered a full-time member, helping revitalize the group. When Héctor Garza had his legal problems, Tarzan stepped back into the scene with allies Averno and Mephisto being treated like full-time members. 2005 was looking good for Los Guerreros until Olímpico injured his neck on a dive in a tag title match with Bucanero against Atlantis and Panther on the first show in Arena Mexico.

=== Los Guerreros de Atlantida (2005–2011) ===
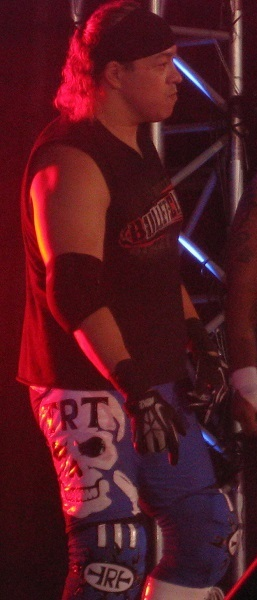
Rey Bucanero, founding member and later enemy of Los Guerreros

In September, Averno and Mephisto took the CMLL tag titles back for the Guerreros, just weeks after Doctor X, Sangre Azteca and Nitro managed to finally wrestle away the National Trios Titles away from Volador Jr., Felino and Safari after several unsuccessful attempts.

On May 28, 2006, in Arena Coliseo, Bucanero turned against Guerrero and Tarzan Boy during a match with Negro Casas, Heavy Metal and Místico, bringing a temporary end to the trios. Later on, Tarzan Boy would turn tecnicó and compete under the name "Toscano". Último Guerrero and Atlantis kept the Guerreros del Infierno name alive, even after Olímpico left CMLL and the group of mid-carders broke away to form Los Guerreros Tuareg. In 2008 Rey Bucanero returned to the group making Los Guerreros del Infierno a trio once more.

On November 2, 2010, Dragón Rojo Jr. replaced an injured Atlantis and teamed with Último Guerrero to defeat Mr. Águila and Hector Garza for the CMLL World Tag Team Championship. After the match it was announced that Dragón Rojo Jr. had left his old stable Poder Mexica to become the newest member of Los Guerreros de la Atlantida. On April 8, 2011, Último Guerrero and Escorpión won CMLL's Torneo Gran Alternativa, an eight tag team tournament where veterans form teams with newcomers. Following the win, Escorpion joined Los Guerreros de la Atlantida under the new ring name Rey Escorpión.

=== Los Guerreros Laguneros (2011–present) ===
After weeks of tension between Atlantis and Último Guerrero, CMLL held a press conference on August 11, where Atlantis officially turned técnico and left Los Guerreros de la Atlantida. The following day, Guerrero lost the CMLL World Heavyweight Championship to Héctor Garza, who also turned at the same press conference, ending his reign at 963 days, the third longest in the title's history. In July 2012, Guerrero officially kicked Rey Escorpión from Los Guerreros del Infierno, though he had turned on the group weeks earlier, and named Euforia and Niebla Roja as his replacements. On August 3, Guerrero and Rojo Jr. lost the CMLL World Tag Team Championship to Atlantis and Diamante Azul, ending their reign at 640 days, the longest reign in the title's history. During the celebration of Atlantis' 30th anniversary as a wrestler Guerrero appeared after a match to berate Atlantis, which turned out to only be a distraction for the real Último Guerrero to attack Atlantis from behind. The two identically dressed Guerreros proceeded to beat up Atlantis and tear his mask apart. Following the match Último Guerrero introduced his younger brother Gran Guerrero. The younger Guerrero had previously been introduced as the son of Último Guerrero in 2009, but went on to wrestle under the ring name "Taurus" for International Wrestling Revolution Group (IRWG), and was involved in Toryumon Mexico's Copa Toyota tournament alongside his brother in 2012. On May 9, 2013 Gran Guerrero was officially introduced as an addition to Los Guerreros del Infierno. On March 28, 2014, Guerrero, Euforia and Niebla Roja defeated Los Estetas del Aire (Máscara Dorada, Místico and Valiente) to win the CMLL World Trios Championship. They lost the title to Sky Team (Místico, Valiente and Volador Jr.) on February 13, 2015.

In the spring of 2017 CMLL began a storyline where Niebla Roja started having problems with his fellow Los Guerreros Laguneros teammates, initially by accidentally causing them to lose matches due to miscommunication between Niebla Roja and Euforia and Gran Guerrero. As the storyline progressed Niebla Roja refused to participate in Los Guerreros rudo antics such as double or triple teaming an opponent. On May 19 Niebla Roja's tecnico turn was completed as he kicked Los Guerreros leader Último Guerrero in the face during a match. Afterward Último Guerrero and Gran Guerrero beat Niebla Roja up, tore his mask off and demanded that Niebla Roja had to come up with a new mask instead of wearing the Último Guerrero inspired mask. During the attack he was aided by his brother Ángel de Oro.

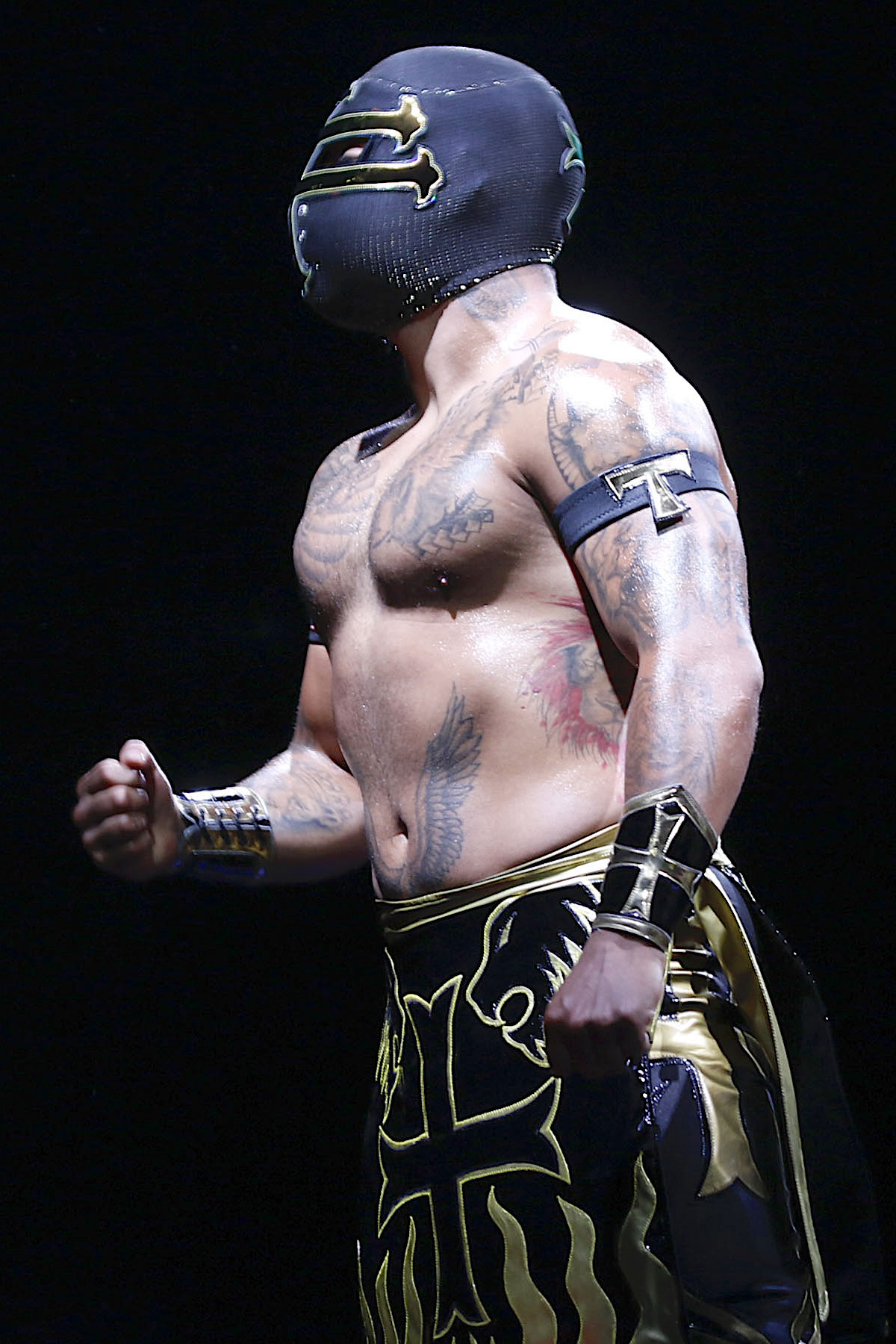
Templario is considered an adopted Lagunero, despite being born in the state of Tlaxcala.

On July 1, 2018, Los Guerreros Laguneros ended Sky Team's 1,223-day reign with the CMLL World Trios Championship as they defeated them in the main event of CMLL's Domingos Arena México show. Subsequently, Los Guerreros were positioned as "Defenders of CMLL" as they began a storyline feud with The Cl4n (Ciber the Main Man, The Chrizh and Sharlie Rockstar), three wrestlers who had made a name for themselves in CMLL's main rival Lucha Libre AAA Worldwide. On September 14, The Cl4n won the World Trios Championship, but Los Guerreros won the championship back two weeks later on September 28. On November 23, Los Guerreros introduced Templario as their newest member, pronouncing him an adopted Lagunero even though he was not from the Lagoon area. On March 26, 2021, they lost the World Trios Championship to Nueva Generación Dinamita, resulting in Euforia turning on Último Guerrero and leaving the stable.

In January 2022, while on opposing sides, Último Guerrero turned on Templario by tearing his mask, ending his time in the stable. For the rest of the year, Los Guerreros could have been classed as a tag team, but were mostly used in trios matches. They had worked on-and-off with Atlantis Jr. since around November 2021, occasionally going by the Los Guerreros de la Atlantida name. However, Atlantis Jr. did not join the stable and began working with his father towards the end of 2022. In January 2023, Stuka Jr. became the newest member of the stable; he had worked a few shows with Los Guerreros in the past couple of weeks and had developed a feud with Atlantis Jr. who had won his mask in September 2022.

== Members ==
Current

Member	Time	Notes
Último Guerrero	January 2001	Leader / Founder
Gran Guerrero	May 2013	
Stuka Jr.	January 2023	

Former

Member	Joined	Left	Notes
Rey Bucanero	January 2001	May 2006	Founder
Rey Bucanero	January 2008	August 2010	Founder
Tarzan Boy	January 2001	July 2008	Founder
Máscara Mágica	June 2001	February 2002	
Olímpico	October 2004	November 2008	
Sangre Azteca	November 2006	December 2008	
Eclipse	July 2006	September 2007	
Atlantis	September 2005	August 2011	Former co-leader
Dragón Rojo Jr.	July 2010	September 2012	
Rey Escorpión	August 2011	September 2012	
Niebla Roja	July 2012	May 2017	
Euforia	July 2012	March 2021	
Templario	November 2018	January 2022	

== Championships and accomplishments ==
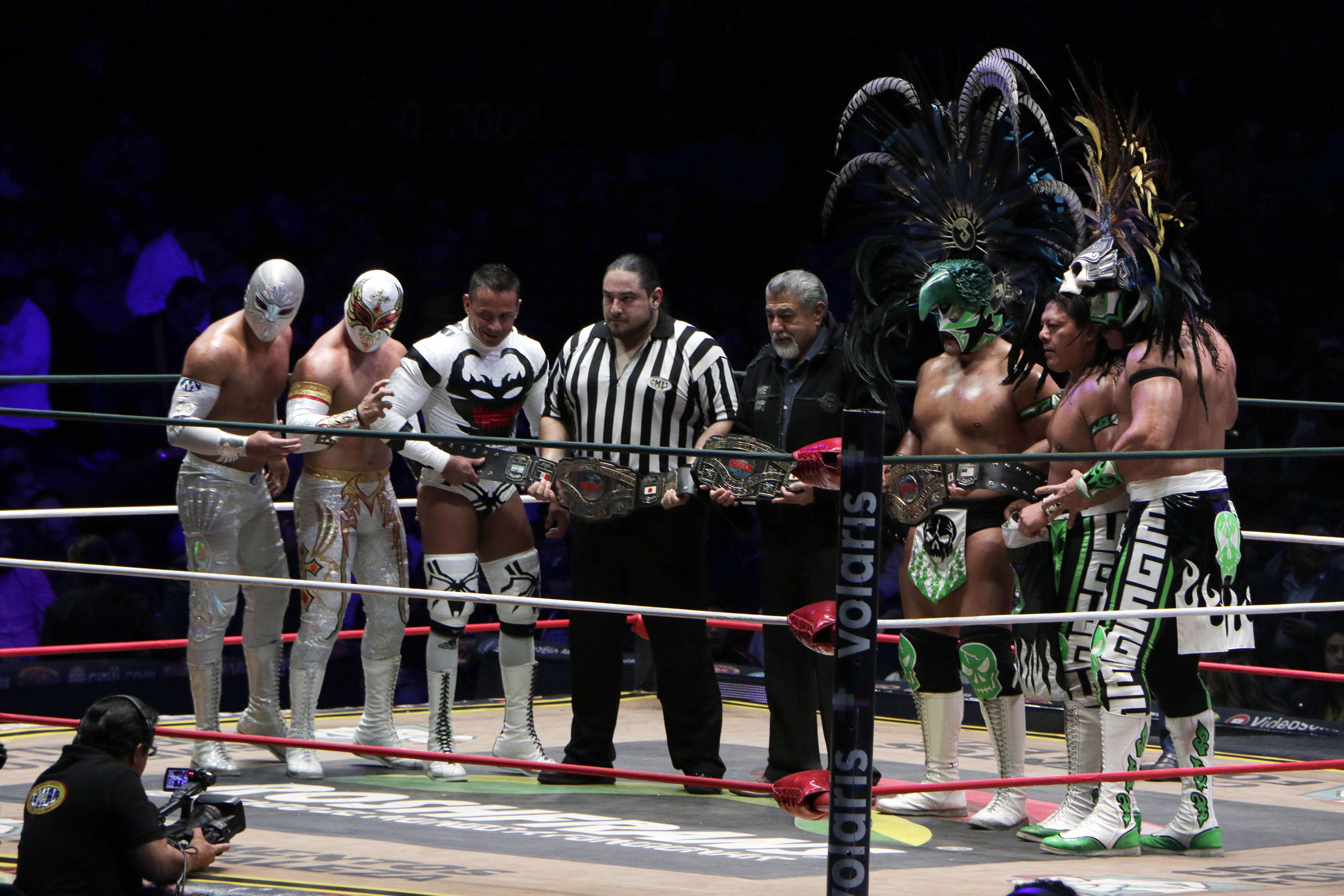
Champions Los Guerreros Laguneros (right) and challengers Carístico, Místico and Volador Jr. (left) before a match in November 2018.

Only titles won when they were members of Los Guerreros are listed.

- Consejo Mundial de Lucha Libre
  - NWA World Historic Middleweight Championship – Dragón Rojo Jr. (1 time), Último Guerrero (1 time)
  - NWA World Light Heavyweight Championship (Note: The NWA has not sanctioned this title since 1990 when CMLL withdrew.) – Tarzan Boy (1 time)
  - CMLL World Heavyweight Championship – Último Guerrero (2 times), Gran Guerrero (1 time)
  - CMLL World Middleweight Championship – Dragón Rojo Jr. (1 time)
  - CMLL World Light Heavyweight Championship – Último Guerrero (1 time)
  - CMLL World Tag Team Championship (7 times) – Atlantis & Último Guerrero (1 time), Último Guerrero & Rey Bucanero (3 times), Último Guerrero & Dr. Wagner Jr. (1 time), Último Guerrero & Dragón Rojo Jr. (1 time) Euforia & Gran Guerrero (1 time)
  - CMLL World Trios Championship – Atlantis, Último Guerrero & Tarzan Boy (1 time), Atlantis, Último Guerrero & Negro Casas (1 time), Euforia, Niebla Roja & Último Guerrero (1 time), Euforia, Gran Guerrero & Último Guerrero (2 times)
  - Mexican National Middleweight Championship – Templario (1 time)
  - Mexican National Welterweight Championship – Sangre Azteca (1 time)
  - CMLL Universal Championship (2009, 2014) – Último Guerrero
  - International Gran Prix (2006, 2007) – Último Guerrero
  - Leyenda de Azul (2016) – Último Guerrero
  - Torneo Gran Alternativa (2008, 2011) – Último Guerrero & Dragón Rojo Jr., and Último Guerrero & Rey Escorpión
  - Torneo Nacional de Parejas Increibles (2014, 2021) – Euforia (with Atlantis), and Templario (with Volador Jr.)
  - La Copa Junior (2010) - Dragón Rojo Jr.
  - Reyes del Aire (2020) – Templario
  - Copa Dinastías (2024) - Stuka Jr. (with Hijo de Stuka Jr.)
  - Torneo de Parejas Increibles Internacionales (2016) - Último Guerrero & Atlantis
  - Copa Tzompantli (2025) - Stuka Jr.
  - Copa Herdez (2010) - Rey Bucanero & Último Guerrero
  - Copa 70 Aniversario de la Arena Mexico Último Guerrero (with Mistico, Ángel de Oro & Bárbaro Cavernario)
  - Copa Bobby Bonales (2014) – Último Guerrero
- Federación Mundial de Lucha Libre
  - Champion du Monde (1 time) - Último Guerrero
  - FMLL Tag Team Championship (1 time) – Último Guerrero & Gran Guerrero
- Lucha Libre Azteca
  - Azteca Championship (2 times) - Último Guerrero
- Lucha Libre Voz
  - Voz Ultra Championship (1 time, inaugural) - Niebla Roja
- Major League Wrestling
  - MLW National Openweight Championship (1 time) - Último Guerrero
- New Japan Pro-Wrestling
  - CMLL's Brother Tag Team Tournament (2018) – Último Guerrero & Gran Guerrero
  - Interfaction Tag Team Tournament (2023) - Ultimo Guerrero & Atlantis Jr.
  - Interfaction Tag Team Tournament (2024) - Ultimo Guerrero & Stuka Jr.
- Toryumon Mexico
  - Copa Mundial (2014) - Último Guerrero
  - Copa NSK (2013) - Último Guerrero
- Total Nonstop Action Wrestling
  - TNA World X Cup (2008) – Último Guerrero & Rey Bucanero (with Volador Jr. & Averno)
- Universal Wrestling Entertainment
  - UWE Tag Team Championship (1 time) – Último Guerrero & Atlantis
- World Wrestling Association
  - WWA World Tag Team Championship (1 time) – Último Guerrero (with Perro Aguayo Jr.)
- Wrestling Observer Newsletter awards
  - Best Tag Team of the Decade (2000–2009) – Rey Bucanero & Último Guerrero
  - Wrestling Observer Newsletter Hall of Fame (Class of 2019) - Último Guerrero
