= List of CMLL World Trios Champions =

List of professional wrestling trios tag team champions

The CMLL World Trios Championship (Campeonato Mundial Trios de CMLL in Spanish) is the primary professional wrestling three-man tag team championship promoted by the Mexican Lucha Libre wrestling promotion Consejo Mundial de Lucha Libre (CMLL; Spanish for "World Wrestling Council") since 1993. Before the CMLL World Trios Championship was created, the Mexican National Trios Championship was the primary Trios championship in CMLL; since 1993, the Mexican National title has been relegated to a secondary championship compared to the CMLL World Trios Championship. As it is a professional wrestling championship, it is not won legitimately; it is instead won via a scripted ending to a match or awarded to a wrestler because of a storyline. All title matches take place under two out of three falls rules.

The first champions to be recognized by CMLL were MS-1, Pirata Morgan and El Satánico (a team known as Los Infernales; Spanish for "The Infernals") who defeated the team of El Brazo, Brazo de Oro and Brazo de Plata (known collectively as Los Brazos; Spanish for "The Arms") in the finals of a 16-team tournament. The current champions are El Sky Team (Máscara Dorada, Místico and Neón). They won the titles by defeating Los Infernales (Euforia, Averno and Mephisto) at Viernes Espectacular on May 16, 2025, in Mexico City, Mexico. they are the 37th team overall to win the championship. There have been 37 overall championship reigns; in total. La Ola Amarilla ("The Yellow Wave"; Okumura, Hiroshi Tanahashi and Taichi) held the championship the shortest time, at 14 days. Black Warrior, Blue Panther and Dr. Wagner Jr. hold the record for the longest single reign of any team, but due to the uncertainty of when the championship was vacated it can only be verified that they held them for a minimum of 1,141 days. (Note: The exact date on which the title was vacated is not known, which means their title reign lasted between 1,141 and 1,168 days.) Dr. Wagner Jr.'s four reigns combine to 2,051 days, the highest of any wrestler. Los Infernales and the team of El Hijo del Fantasma, Héctor Garza and La Máscara (Collectively known as Los Ángeles Rebeldes; "The Rebel Angels") are the only two trios to have won the title twice; Héctor Garza also holds the record for most individual reigns, with five reigns as part of four teams. The championship has been vacated six times, either because one or more members of the team left the promotion or because a team split up; each time a tournament was held to determine the new champions.

== Title history ==
Key
No.	Overall reign number
Reign	Reign number for the specific team—reign numbers for the individuals are in parentheses, if different
Days	Number of days held
N/A	Unknown information
+	Current reign is changing daily

No.	Champion	Championship change			Reign statistics		Notes	Ref.
No.	Champion	Date	Event	Location	Reign	Days	Notes	Ref.
Consejo Mundial de Lucha Libre (CMLL)
1	Los Infernales (MS-1, Pirata Morgan and El Satánico)	November 22, 1991	Super Viernes	Mexico City, Distrito Federal	1	121	Defeated Los Brazos in the finals of a 16-team tournament.	
2	Los Intocables (Jaque Mate, Masakre and Pierroth Jr.)	March 22, 1992	Live event	Mexico City, Distrito Federal	1	182		
3	Los Infernales (MS-1, Pirata Morgan and El Satánico)	September 20, 1992	Live event	Mexico City, Distrito Federal	2	198		
4	Los Brazos (El Brazo, Brazo de Oro and Brazo de Plata)	April 6, 1993	Live event	Mexico City, Distrito Federal	1	381		
5	La Nueva Ola Blanca (Gran Markus Jr., El Hijo del Gladiador and Dr. Wagner Jr.)	April 22, 1994	Super Viernes	Mexico City, Distrito Federal	1	343		
6	Los Chacales (Bestia Salvaje, Emilio Charles Jr. and Sangre Chicana)	March 31, 1995	Super Viernes	Mexico City, Distrito Federal	1	357		
7	Dos Caras, La Fiera and Héctor Garza	March 22, 1996	Homenaje a Salvador Lutteroth	Mexico City, Distrito Federal	1	(Note: The exact date on which Héctor Garza left CMLL is not known, which means their title reign lasted between 285 and 364 days.)		
—	Vacated	1997	—	—	—	—	Championship vacated when Garza left the promotion.	
8	Emilio Charles Jr., Rey Bucanero and El Satánico	March 21, 1997	Homenaje a Salvador Lutteroth	Mexico City, Distrito Federal	1 (2, 1, 3)	39	Defeated Apolo Dantés, Black Warrior, and Dr. Wagner Jr. in the finals of a one-night eight-team tournament for the vacant titles.	
9	La Ola Azul (Atlantis, Lizmark and Mr. Niebla)	April 29, 1997	Live event	Mexico City, Distrito Federal	1	(Note: The exact date on which the title was vacated is not known, which means their title reign lasted between 256 and 277 days.)		
—	Vacated	October, 1998	—	—	—	—	Championship vacated when Mr. Niebla was injured.	
10	Black Warrior, Blue Panther and Dr. Wagner Jr.	December 18, 1998	Super Viernes	Mexico City, Distrito Federal	1 (1, 1, 2)		Defeated Bestia Salvaje, Scorpio Jr. and Zumbido in the finals of an eight-team tournament.	
—	Vacated	February, 2002	—	—	—	—	Championship vacated when the team broke up.	
11	Blue Panther, Fuerza Guerrera and Dr. Wagner Jr.	March 17, 2002	Homenaje a Dos Leyendas	Mexico City, Distrito Federal	1 (2, 1, 3)	91	Defeated Black Warrior, Mr. Niebla and Antifaz del Norte for the vacant titles.	
12	Atlantis, Black Warrior and Mr. Niebla	June 16, 2002	Live event	Mexico City, Distrito Federal	1 (2, 2, 2)	428		
13	Black Tiger III, Universo 2000 and Dr. Wagner Jr.	March 21, 2003	Homenaje a Dos Leyendas	Mexico City, Distrito Federal	1 (1, 1, 4)	476		
14	Black Warrior, El Canek and Rayo de Jalisco Jr.	July 9, 2004	Super Viernes	Mexico City, Distrito Federal	1 (3, 1, 1)	133		
15	La Furia del Norte (Héctor Garza, Tarzan Boy and El Terrible)	November 19, 2004	Live event	Mexico City, Distrito Federal	1 (2, 1, 1)	666		
—	Vacated	September 16, 2006	—	—	—	—	Championship vacated after not being defended for at least 20 months.	
16	Los Guerreros de la Atlantida (Atlantis, Tarzan Boy and Último Guerrero)	September 29, 2006	CMLL 73rd Anniversary Show	Mexico City, Distrito Federal	1 (3, 2, 1)	140	Defeated Perro Aguayo Jr., Héctor Garza and Shocker for the vacant titles.	
17	Los Perros del Mal (Perro Aguayo Jr., Mr. Águila and Héctor Garza)	February 16, 2007	Super Viernes	Mexico City, Distrito Federal	1 (1, 1, 3)	463		
—	Vacated	May 24, 2008	—	—	—	—	Championship vacated after the team broke up.	
18	Los Ángeles Rebeldes (Héctor Garza, El Hijo del Fantasma and La Máscara)	June 13, 2008	Infierno en el Ring	Mexico City, Distrito Federal	1 (4, 1, 1)	53	Defeated Blue Panther, Dos Caras Jr. and Místico in the finals of an eight-team tournament to win the vacant titles.	
19	Los Guerreros Negros (Atlantis, Negro Casas and Último Guerrero)	August 5, 2008	Super Viernes	Mexico City, Distrito Federal	1 (3, 1, 2)	166		
20	Los Ángeles Rebeldes (Héctor Garza, El Hijo del Fantasma and La Máscara)	January 18, 2009	Live event	Guadalajara, Jalisco	2 (5, 2, 2)	474		
21	La Ola Amarilla (Okumura, Hiroshi Tanahashi and Taichi)	May 7, 2010	Super Viernes	Mexico City, Distrito Federal	1	14		
22	La Generación Dorada (Máscara Dorada, La Sombra and La Máscara)	May 21, 2010	Super Viernes	Mexico City, Distrito Federal	1 (1, 1, 3)	420		
23	Los Hijos del Averno (Averno, Ephesto and Mephisto)	July 15, 2011	Super Viernes	Mexico City, Mexico	1	219		
24	El Bufete del Amor (Marco Corleone, Máximo and Rush)	February 19, 2012	Live event	Mexico City, Mexico	1	445		
—	Vacated	May 9, 2013	—	—	—	—	Championship vacated due to injury to Corleone.	
25	Los Estetas del Aire (Máscara Dorada, Místico, Valiente)	June 16, 2013	Live event	Mexico City, Mexico	1 (2, 1, 1)	285	Defeated Los Guerreros Laguneros (Euforia, Niebla Roja and Último Guerrero) in the finals of an eight-team tournament to win the vacant titles.	
26	Los Guerreros Laguneros (Euforia, Niebla Roja and Último Guerrero)	March 28, 2014	Super Viernes	Mexico City, Mexico	1 (1, 1, 3)	322		
27	Sky Team (Místico, Valiente and Volador Jr.)	February 13, 2015	Super Viernes	Mexico City, Mexico	1 (2, 2, 1)	1,234		
28	Los Guerreros Laguneros (Euforia, Gran Guerrero and Último Guerrero)	July 1, 2018	Domingos Arena México	Mexico City, Mexico	1 (2, 1, 4)	75		
29	The Cl4n (Ciber the Main Man, The Chris and Sharlie Rockstar)	September 14, 2018	CMLL 85th Anniversary Show	Mexico City, Mexico	1	14		
30	Los Guerreros Laguneros (Euforia, Gran Guerrero and Último Guerrero)	September 28, 2018	Super Viernes	Mexico City, Mexico	2 (3, 2, 5)	910		
31	Nueva Generación Dinamita (El Cuatrero, Forastero and Sansón)	March 26, 2021	CMLL La Vopa Jr. VIP	Mexico City, Mexico	1	N/A	The exact length of this reign is uncertain.	
—	Vacated	N/A	—	—	—	—	Vacated somewhere at the beginning of April under unknown circumstances. On August 11, 2021, CMLL announced that the titles were vacated as a result of the current champions leaving the company, despite NGD apparently already having relinquished them.	
32	Los Malditos (El Sagrado, Gemelo Diablo I & Gemelo Diablo II)	March 18, 2022	Homenaje a Dos Leyendas	Mexico City, Mexico	1	169	Defeated Los Guerreros Laguneros (Gran Guerrero & Ultimo Guerrero) and Atlantis to win the vacant titles.	
33	Los Infernales (Euforia, Hechicero and Mephisto)	September 3, 2022	Noche de Campeones	Mexico City, Mexico	1 (4, 1, 2)	272		
34	Atlantis Jr., Star Jr. and Volador Jr.	June 2, 2023	Super Viernes	Mexico City, Mexico	1 (1, 1, 2)	248		
35	Los Bárbaros (Dragón Rojo Jr., Bárbaro Cavernario and El Terrible)	February 5, 2024	CMLL Lunes Arena Puebla	Puebla, Mexico	1 (1, 1, 2)	162		
36	Máscara Dorada, Star Jr. and Neón	July 16, 2024	CMLL Martes De Arena Mexico	Mexico City, Mexico	1 (1, 1, 1)	73		
37	Los Infernales (Euforia, Averno and Mephisto)	September 27, 2024	Noche de Campeones	Mexico City, Mexico	1 (5, 2, 3)	231		
38	El Sky Team (Máscara Dorada, Místico and Neón)	May 16, 2025	Viernes Espectacular	Mexico City, Mexico	1 (2, 1, 2)	527+		

== Combined reigns ==
As of October 25, 2026.

=== By team ===
Symbol	Meaning
†	Indicates the current champion
¤	The exact length of at least one title reign is uncertain, so the shortest possible length is used

Rank	Team	No. of reigns	Combined days
1	Sky Team (Místico, Valiente and Volador Jr.)	1	1,234
2	Black Warrior, Blue Panther and Dr. Wagner Jr.	1	1,141¤
3	Los Guerreros Laguneros (Euforia, Gran Guerrero and Último Guerrero)	2	985
4	La Furia del Norte (Héctor Garza, Tarzan Boy and El Terrible)	1	666
5	El Sky Team † (Máscara Dorada, Místico and Neón)	1	527+
6	Los Ángeles Rebeldes (Héctor Garza, El Hijo del Fantasma and La Máscara)	2	527
7	Black Tiger III, Universo 2000 and Dr. Wagner Jr.	1	476
8	Los Perros del Mal (Perro Aguayo Jr., Mr. Águila and Héctor Garza)	1	463
9	El Bufete del Amor (Marco Corleone, Máximo and Rush)	1	445
10	Atlantis, Black Warrior and Mr. Niebla	1	428
11	La Generación Dorada (Máscara Dorada, La Sombra and La Máscara)	1	420
12	Los Brazos (El Brazo, Brazo de Oro and Brazo de Plata)	1	381
13	Los Chacales (Bestia Salvaje, Emilio Charles Jr. and Sangre Chicana)	1	357
14	La Nueva Ola Blanca (Gran Markus Jr., El Hijo del Gladiador and Dr. Wagner Jr.)	1	343
15	Los Guerreros Laguneros (Euforia, Niebla Roja and Último Guerrero)	1	322
16	Los Infernales (MS-1, Pirata Morgan and El Satánico)	2	319
17	Dos Caras, La Fiera and Héctor Garza	1	285¤
18	Los Estetas del Aire (Máscara Dorada, Místico and Valiente)	1	285
19	Los Infernales (Euforia, Hechicero and Mephisto)	1	272
20	Atlantis, Lizmark and Mr. Niebla	1	256¤
21	Atlantis Jr., Star Jr. and Volador Jr.	1	248
22	Los Infernales † (Euforia, Averno and Mephisto)	1	231
23	Los Hijos del Averno (Averno, Ephesto and Mephisto)	1	219
24	Los Intocables (Jaque Mate, Masakre and Pierroth Jr.)	1	182
25	Los Malditos (El Sagrado, Gemelo Diablo I and Gemelo Diablo II)	1	169
26	Los Guerreros Negros (Atlantis, Negro Casas and Último Guerrero)	1	166
27	Los Bárbaros † (Dragón Rojo Jr., Bárbaro Cavernario and El Terrible)	1	162
28	Los Guerreros de Atlantidad (Atlantis, Tarzan Boy and Último Guerrero)	1	140
29	Black Warrior, El Canek and Rayo de Jalisco Jr.	1	133
30	Blue Panther, Fuerza Guerrera and Dr. Wagner Jr.	1	91
31	Máscara Dorada, Star Jr. and Neón	1	73
32	Emilio Charles Jr., Rey Bucanero and El Satánico	1	39
33	La Ola Amarilla (Okumura, Hiroshi Tanahashi and Taichi)	1	14
33	The Cl4n (Ciber the Main Man, The Chris and Sharlie Rockstar)	1	14
35	Nueva Generación Dinamita (El Cuatrero, Forastero & Sansón)	1	N/A¤

=== By wrestler ===
Rank	Wrestler	No. of reigns	Combined days
1	Dr. Wagner Jr.	4	2,051¤
2	Héctor Garza	5	1,941¤
3	Euforia	5	1,910
4	Black Warrior	3	1,702¤
5	Último Guerrero	5	1,600
6	Valiente	2	1,519
6	Místico	2	1,519
8	Volador Jr.	2	1,482
9	Blue Panther	2	1,232¤
10	Atlantis	4	990¤
11	Gran Guerrero	2	972
12	La Máscara	3	947
13	El Terrible	2	828
14	Tarzan Boy	2	806
15	Mephisto	3	722
16	Máscara Dorada	2	705
17	Mr. Niebla	2	684¤
18	Máscara Dorada †	2	600+
18	Neón †	2	600+
20	Místico †	1	527+
21	El Hijo del Fantasma	2	527
22	Universo 2000	1	476
23	Mr. Águila	1	463
23	Perro Aguayo Jr.	1	463
25	Averno	2	450
26	Marco Corleone	1	445
26	Máximo	1	445
26	Rush	1	445
29	La Sombra	1	420
30	Emilio Charles Jr.	2	396
31	Brazo de Oro	1	381
31	Brazo de Plata	1	381
31	El Brazo	1	381
34	Star Jr.	2	364
35	El Satánico	3	358
36	Bestia Salvaje	1	357
36	Sangre Chicana	1	357
38	El Hijo del Gladiador	1	343
38	Gran Markus Jr.	1	343
40	Niebla Roja	1	322
41	MS-1	2	319
41	Pirata Morgan	2	319
43	Dos Caras	2	285¤
43	La Fiera	1	285¤
45	Hechicero	1	272
46	Lizmark	1	256¤
47	Atlantis Jr.	1	248
48	Ephesto	1	219
49	Jaque Mate	1	182
49	Masakre	1	182
49	Pierroth Jr.	1	182
52	El Sagrado	1	169
52	Gemelo Diablo I	1	169
52	Gemelo Diablo II	1	169
55	Negro Casas	1	166
56	Dragón Rojo Jr.	1	162
56	Bárbaro Cavernario	1	162
58	El Canek	1	133
58	Rayo de Jalisco Jr.	1	133
60	Fuerza Guerrera	1	91
61	Rey Bucanero	1	39
62	Okumura	1	14
62	Hiroshi Tanahashi	1	14
62	Taichi	1	14
62	Ciber the Main Man	1	14
62	The Crish	1	14
62	Sharlie Rockstar	1	14
68	El Cuatrero	1	N/A¤
68	Forastero	1	N/A¤
68	Sansón	1	N/A¤
