= Los Gemelos Diablo =

Professional wrestling tag team

Tag team
- Members: Gemelo Diablo I/Gemelo Pantera I Gemelo Diablo II/Gemelo Pantera II
- Name(s): Los Gemelos Diablo; Los Gemelos Pantera
- Debut: August 18, 2012

Los Gemelos Diablo, previously known as Los Gemelos Pantera, are a Mexican professional wrestling tag team consisting of twin brothers Gemelo Diablo I and Gemelo Diablo II (Spanish for "Devil Twin I" and "Devil Twin II"; born May 23, 1999), previously known by their ring names as Gemelo Pantera I and Gemelo Pantera II respectively. They current work for the Mexican professional wrestling promotion Consejo Mundial de Lucha Libre (CMLL), portraying rudo ("Bad guy") wrestling characters. Their real names are not a matter of public record, as is often the case with masked wrestlers in Mexico, where their private lives are kept a secret from the wrestling fans.

They formed both the trios team Los Malditos with El Sagrado in 2022, and Los Bestia Del Diablo with Akuma in 2023. The Gemelos Diablo name & gimmick is recycled from a prior tag team of twins - Alfredo & Jose Sanchez - who wrestled for EMLL (CMLL's prior name) in the 1970s.

== Personal lives ==
The wrestlers known as "Gemelo Diablo I" (Spanish for "Devil Twin I") and Gemelos Diablo II ("Devil Twin II") were both born and raised in Matamoros, Tamaulipas, Mexico, the twin sons of Pantera Blanca Jr and grandsons of Pantera Blanca.

== Championships and accomplishments ==
- Consejo Mundial de Lucha Libre
  - CMLL World Trios Championship (1 time) - with El Sagrado
