= Jaque Mate (wrestler) =

Mexican professional wrestler

Personal information
- Born: Jaime Álvarez Mendoza; September 29, 1948 (age 77) Guadalajara, Jalisco, Mexico

Professional wrestling career
- Ring name(s): El Enfermero, Jr. Jaque Mate; Skorvikan
- Billed height: 1.70 m (5 ft 7 in)
- Billed weight: 97 kg (214 lb)
- Trained by: El Enfermero; Diablo Velazco
- Debut: September 15, 1971; Santa Fe, Districto Federal.
- Retired: September 15, 2019

Jaime Álvarez Mendoza (born September 29, 1948) is a Mexican professional wrestler who is best known for working under the ring name Jaque Mate (Spanish for "Checkmate") in Consejo Mundial de Lucha Libre (CMLL). Àlvarez worked under the ring name El Enfermero, Jr. (the Nurse, Junior) for 13 years and has also worked as Skorvikan. As Jaque Mate, Álvarez is most known for being a founding member of the wrestling trio Los Intocables (the untouchables) along with Pierroth, Jr. and Masakre. Los Intocables held the CMLL World Trios Championship once, winning the title from and losing the title to Los Infernales (MS-1, El Satánico and Pirata Morgan. He also held the NWA World Light Heavyweight Championship for almost 20 months from March 25, 1993, until December 4, 1994. Álvarez wrestling style as Jaque Mate earned him the nickname El Hombre de la jugada mortal (Spanish for "The man with the deadly move").

== Professional wrestling career ==
Jaime Álvarez began training for a professional wrestling career under Diablo Velazco in 1969 but did not make his debut until September 15, 1971, training for nearly three years under Velazco and El Enfermero. Álvarez adopted an enmascarado, masked, persona called Eskovirkan, a name created by combining the Zodiac signs of Scorpio, Virgo and Cancer (In Spanish: Escorpión, Virgo and Cáncer"). In 1974 Álvarez' long time friend and trainer El Enfermero gave him permission to use his name and Álvarez began working as El Enfermero, Jr., wearing a mask and outfit very similar to the original El Enfermero. Álvarez worked under a mask until June 24, 1983, until he lost it to Solar II in a Luchas de Apuestas. Originally Álvarez was scheduled for a title match on the night and Solar II was booked in an Apuesta match against another wrestler, when Solar II's opponent did not show Álvarez was asked to lose the match to Solar II. After losing the mask Álvarez lifted his mask to show his face, but in a break with Lucha Libre tradition did not remove the mask in front of the audience. Álvarez kept working as Enfermero, Jr. until 1988 where he adopted the ring persona he is most known as Jaque Mate

The Jaque Mate persona was inspired by the 1920s and 1930s Chicago Gangster scene, complete with black suit and fedora hat, in addition to a black mask with white chess pieces on it. In 1990 Jaque Mate teamed up with Pierroth, Jr. and Masakre to form Los Intocables (Spanish for "The Untouchables"), with both Pierroth, Jr. and Masakre adopting the same type of "Gangster" ring wear Jaque Mate used. The team worked a heated storyline feud with Los Infernales (MS-1, Pirata Morgan and Satánico), a group Masakre left to form Los Intocables, the feud saw Los Incotables win the CMLL World Trios Championship from Los Infernales on March 22, 1992. The team held the belts for approximately six months before Los Infernales regained them. In March 1993 Jaque Mate and Masakre entered a tournament for the vacant CMLL World Tag Team Championship. They defeated Kahoz and Gran Markus, Jr. in the first round but lost to Vampiro and Pierroth, Jr. in the second round. On March 25, 1993, Jaque Mate defeated Apolo Dantés to win the NWA World Light Heavyweight Championship. Over the next 20 months Jaque Mate would defend the title ten times, against opponents such as Pirata Morgan, El Dandy, Ringo Mendoza, Silver King and Blue Demon, Jr. before losing the title to El Dandy on December 4, 1994.

When Sangre Chicana left CMLL to join CMLL's rival promotion Asistencia Asesoría y Administración (AAA), Álvarez decided to join him, continuing an ongoing feud between the two. His feud with Sangre Chicana was put on hold as Jaque Mate began working with Octagón. The two were on opposite sides in a tag team Steel cage match where the last man in the cage would either be unmasked or shaved. In the end neither Octagón nor Jaque Mate were involved in the finish, having both fallen off the cage to safety while fighting each other, in the end Heavy Metal defeated Kick Boxer, forcing him to unmask Three months later Jaque Mate and Octagón squared off in a Luchas de Apuestas match, which was the main event of the 1999 Guerra de Titanes. Jaque Mate lost to Octagón and was forced to unmask for the third time in his career. According to Álvarez he was paid "a substantial sum of money" to lose his mask to Octagón that night. After losing his mask to Octagón Jaque Mate resumed his feud with Sangre Chicana, losing a Luchas de Apuesta match that saw him shaved bald. Álvarez does not wrestle full-time, working a lighter schedule after 38 years in the business. He mainly works local shows for smaller promotions.

Wrestled aged 70 on April 21, 2019, in a 6-tag match with Roco Vann and Tsunami as they were defeated by Huracan Ramirez, Mascara Magica Jr. and Pegasus Kid Jr.

== Championships and accomplishments ==
- Consejo Mundial de Lucha Libre
  - CMLL World Trios Championship (1 time) – with Pierroth, Jr. and Masakre
  - NWA World Light Heavyweight Championship (1 time)
- Comisión de Box y Lucha Libre Mexico D.F.
  - Distrito Federal Heavyweight Championship (1 time)
  - Mexico State Welterweight Championship (1 time)
- Miscellaneous Championships
  - Arena Azteca Middleweight Championship (1 time)
  - Apatlaco Tag Team Championship (1 time)
  - Pan-American Trios Championship (1 time)
  - Xochimilco Tag Team Championship (1 time)

== Luchas de Apuestas record ==
Winner (wager)	Loser (wager)	Location	Event	Date	Notes
El Enfermero (mask)	Eskorvikan (mask)	N/A	Live event	N/A	
Enfermero, Jr. and Enfermero II (mask)	Dios Rojo and Dios Negro (mask)	N/A	Live event	N/A	
El Solar II (mask)	Enfermero, Jr. (mask)	Mexico City	Live event	June 24, 1983	
Enfermero, Jr. (hair)	Emilio Charles Jr. (hair)	N/A	Live event	1980s	
Enfermero, Jr. (hair)	Gran Cochisse (hair)	Mexico City	Live event	N/A	
Enfermero, Jr. (hair)	César Valentino (hair)	Mexico City	Live event	N/A	
Enfermero, Jr. (hair)	Lemús II (hair)	Mexico City	Live event	N/A	
Jaque Mate (mask)	León Kirilenko (hair)	N/A	Live event	N/A	
Jaque Mate (mask)	Chamaco Valaguez (hair)	N/A	Live event	N/A	
Octagón (mask)	Jaque Mate (mask)	Ciudad Madero, Tamaulipas	Guerra de Titanes	December 10, 1999	
Sangre Chicana (hair)	Jaque Mate (hair)	Nuevo Laredo, Tamaulipas	Live event	N/A	
Justiciero (hair)	Jaque Mate (hair)	Coacalco, Mexico State	Live event	October 15, 2006	
Laredo Kid (mask)	Jaque Mate (hair)	Nuevo Laredo, Tamaulipas	Live event	April 14, 2008	(Note: The match also included Sangre Chicana and Scorpio, Jr.)
