= MS-1 (wrestler) =

Mexican professional wrestler (1956 – 2012)

- MS-1 wearing the CMLL World Trios Championship belt

Personal information
- Born: Pablo Fuentes Reyna; December 31, 1956 Salvatierra, Guanajuato, Mexico
- Died: January 12, 2012 (aged 55) Huamantla, Tlaxcala

Professional wrestling career
- Ring name(s): Alienigena II; Kripter; MS-1; Pablo Fuentes; Tormentas
- Billed height: 1.80 m (5 ft 11 in)
- Billed weight: 106 kg (234 lb)
- Debut: July 12, 1978
- Retired: 1998

Pablo Fuentes Reyna (December 31, 1956 – January 12, 2012) was a Mexican professional wrestler, best known under the ring name MS-1 (MS Uno). As MS-1, Fuentes was a founding member of the wrestling group called Los Infernales (the Infernals) and achieved most of his success as part of the group, including being the first Mexican National Trios Champions and the first CMLL World Trios Champions. Fuentes' son is also a professional wrestler working as MS-1 Jr. or MS-Jr.

== Professional wrestling career ==
Reyna made his professional wrestling debut on July 12, 1978 at the age of 21, wrestling under his real name Pablo Fuentes. Within a year the rookie began working for Empresa Mexicana de Lucha Libre (EMLL), Mexico's largest professional wrestling promotion. EMLL decided that Fuentes needed a different ring persona and created the character "MS-1" for him; MS refers to a Mexican Antiterrorist corps where MS-1 is the highest rank. Fuentes was teamed up with another wrestler who was given the name "MS-2", both of them adopted identical masks and outfits, only differentiated by the "1" and "2" on their tights. In March 1979 MS-1 and MS-2 made their in-ring debut. while Fuentes showed great in-ring skill, MS-2 did not seem to progress as fast as Fuentes and was phased out in less than a year allowing "MS-1" to work as a singles wrestler. In his first scripted feud MS-1 faced off against Rayo de Jalisco Jr. in a series of heated matches, culminating in a Luchas de Apuestas match, a "bet match" where each competitor wagered his mask. On July 2, 1982 MS-1 lost the match and was forced to unmask per lucha libre (the professional wrestling style originary from Mexico) traditions; the loss of the mask did not hinder his popularity any, partly because the mask was described as "very ugly" and partly because Fuentes was a good looking man. After the storyline with Rayo de Jalisco Jr. ended MS-1 was paired up with Sangre Chicana in a very heated feud that often saw one or both men end the match with blood all over their face. The end of the storyline between MS-1 and Sangre Chicana saw Chicana defeat MS-1 in a Luchas de Apuestas match, after which MS-1 had all his hair shaved off.

=== Los Infernales ===
In the early 1980s the |trios concept became very popular in Mexico, spearheaded by the trio called Los Misioneros de Muerte (the Missionaries of death) who worked for a rival promotion. EMLL decided to create a trio of villains, or Rudos as they're called in Lucha Libre, to capitalize on the popularity. MS-1 was teamed up with El Satánico and Espectro Jr. to form Los Infernales (the Infernals). Espectro Jr. was forced to retire due to injuries not long after Los Infernales were formed; he was replaced with Pirata Morgan and the trio of MS-1, Satánico and Pirata Morgan quickly became one of the most successful Trios of its time. In addition to success as a team, MS-1 also saw singles success as he won the NWA World Light Heavyweight Championship from Ringo Mendoza on February 12, 1985 only to turn around and lose it to Rayo de Jalisco Jr. on June 21 that same year. In March 1985 Los Infernales participated in a tournament to determine the first Mexican National Trios Champions; Los Infernales defeated three teams to qualify for the finals. In the finals Los Infernales defeated Los Brazos ("the Arms"; El Brazo, Brazo de Oro and Brazo de Plata) to become the first Mexican National Trios champions. That match was just the first match in a long running Inferlanes/Brazos storyline that would run off and on over the next decade. Los Brazos won the initial feud when they defeated Los Infernales for the Mexican Nations Trios Title on December 8, 1985. In October 1986, Pirata Morgan left the group to form a new group called "Los Bucaneros", in his place Los Infernales recruited Masakre to be their third member.

On March 20, 1987, MS-1 defeated his longtime rival Rayo de Jalisco Jr. to once again win the NWA World Light Heavyweight Championship. Six days later, MS-1 and Masakre teamed up to defeat Los Hermanos Dinamita (Cien Caras and Máscara Año 2000) to win the Mexican National Tag Team Championship, starting a feud with Los Hermanos Dinamita. The feud with Los Hermanos Dinamita saw Cien Caras defeat MS-1 for the NWA World Light Heavyweight Championship on June 24, 1987, ending MS-1's reign after just three months. MS-1 and Masakre defended the Mexican National Tag Team titles for just over a year until losing them to Atlantis and Ángel Azteca on April 6, 1988. El Satánico left Los Infernales as he began focusing more on singles matches and MS-1 and Masakre began arguing, then fighting after the two of them lost the tag team titles thus ending Los Infernales. MS-1 and Masakre faced off in a series of matches, culminating with a headline Luchas de Apuestas match at Arena Mexico that MS-1 won.

In the early 1990s Los Infernales reformed, reuniting MS-1, Satánico and Pirata Morgan. The trio participated in the tournament to crown the first CMLL World Trios Champions. Los Infernales won the tournament, defeating Los Brazo in the finals to become the first CMLL World Trios Champions on November 22, 1991. Former Infernales member Masakre had formed his own group, Los Intocables (the Untouchables) consisting of himself, Pierroth Jr. and Jaque Mate (Checkmate). Los Intocables were immediately paired with Los Infernales to create a Rudos vs. Rudos storyline, playing off both the championship chase and the history between the two groups. On March 22, 1992, Los Intocables won the CMLL World Trios Title, however Los Infernales got the final victory in their feud as they defeated Los Intocables for the championship on September 20, 1992. After the storyline with Los Intocables ended Los Infernales renewed their rivalry with Los Brazo, facing off in several main events that drew sell-out crowds all over Mexico. On April 6, 1993, Los Brazo won the CMLL World Trios Title from Los Infernales; a victory that only helped increase the intensity of the rivalry. The Infernales / Brazos feud did not so much with a conclusive victory for either side but rather slowed down and then stopped when Los Infernales split up in the mid 1990s. Both Satánico and Pirata Morgan left CMLL for periods of time to work for Asistencia Asesoría y Administración, CMLL's main rival and in 1996 MS-1 left CMLL for good.

After leaving CMLL Fuentes became a wrestling promoter, promoting shows in smaller arenas around Naucalpan, while also forming a new Los Infernales trio on the Mexican Independent circuit, teaming with his son who wrestled as "MS-1 Jr." and "MS-2", who was often played by various local wrestlers and not one specific person. By the end of the 1990s MS-1 quietly retired from wrestling.

== Death ==
On January 12, 2012, Fuentes died in a car accident in Huamantla, Tlaxcala.

== Championships and accomplishments ==
- Consejo Mundial de Lucha Libre
  - CMLL World Trios Championship (2 times) – with El Satánico and Pirata Morgan
  - Mexican National Tag Team Championship (1 time) – with Masakre
  - Mexican National Trios Championship (2 times) – El Satánico and Pirata Morgan
  - NWA World Light Heavyweight Championship (2 time)
- Other titles
  - Distrito Federal Heavyweight Championship (1 time)

== Luchas de Apuestas record ==
Winner (wager)	Loser (wager)	Location	Event	Date	Notes
Rayo de Jalisco Jr. (mask) and El Jalisco (hair)	MS-1 (mask) and Carlos Plata (hair)	Mexico City	Live event	July 2, 1982	
Rey Misterio (hair)	MS-1 (hair)	Tijuana, Baja California	Live event	N/A	
Draw	MS-1 (hair); El Jalisco (hair)	Mexico City	Live event	July 23, 1982	
Sangre Chicana (hair)	MS-1 (hair)	Mexico City	EMLL 50th Anniversary Show	September 23, 1983	
Sangre Chicana (hair)	MS-1 (hair)	Mexico City	Live event	September 21, 1984	
Pirata Morgan (hair)	MS-1 (hair)	Mexico City	Live event	July 4, 1986	
MS-1 (hair)	El Egipcio (hair)	Mexico City	Live event	February 27, 1987	
MS-1 (hair)	Herodes (hair)	Mexico City	Live event	April 15, 1988	
MS-1 (hair)	Negro Navarro (hair)	N/A	Live event	1988	
MS-1 (hair)	Masakre (hair)	Mexico City	Live event	June 1988	
Atlantis (mask) and El Satánico (hair)	MS-1 (hair) and Tierra Viento y Fuego (mask)	Mexico City	EMLL 56th Anniversary Show	September 22, 1989	
El Faraón and Ringo Mendoza (hair)	MS-1 and Masakre (hair)	Mexico City	Live event	September 7, 1990	
Pirata Morgan (hair)	MS-1 (hair)	Mexico City	Live event	March 15, 1991	
Masakre (hair)	MS-1 (hair)	Mexico City	Live event	December 15, 1991	
El Faraón (hair)	MS-1 (hair)	Mexico City	Live event	July 3, 1992	
Cien Caras (hair)	MS-1 (hair)	Tonalá, Jalisco	Live event	August 13, 1993	
Pirata Morgan (hair)	MS-1 (hair)	Mexico City	Live event	September 29, 1994	
Héctor Garza (hair)	MS-1 (hair)	Puebla, Puebla	Live event	November 27, 1995	
