= Max Star =

Mexican professional wrestler (born 2002)

Personal information
- Born: Unrevealed; February 23, 2002 (age 24) Chimalhuacán, State of Mexico, Mexico

Professional wrestling career
- Ring names: Little Star; Max Star
- Trained by: Tony Salazar; Virus; Fresbee; Skayde; Bandido
- Debut: 2015

Max Star (born February 23, 2002) is a Mexican professional wrestler. He works for the Mexican promotion Consejo Mundial de Lucha Libre (CMLL), portraying a tecnico ("Good guy") wrestling character and is a member of Los Viajeros del Espacio. He originally wrestled under the ring name Little Star but in 2023 he adopted his current name, Max Star. His real name is not a matter of public record, as is often the case with masked wrestlers in Mexico where their private lives are kept a secret from the wrestling fans.

== Career ==
Max Star was invited to participate for the Mexico City team in CMLL's new Torneo de Escuelas tournament, where the CMLL trainees from Mexico City, Puebla, Guadalajara and Comarca Lagunera competed against each other in a series of multi-man matches. The tournament took place in February and March 2023. Max Star's Mexico City team defeated the Comarca Lagunera team in the first round. However, they lost to the Guadalajara team in the final.

After winning a qualifier in Mexico City, together with Futuro, Max Star participated in a multi-man elimination match to crown a new Mexican National Lightweight Champion on 30 July 2023, where Futuro become the new champion. The concept of the tournament was that two wrestlers from Guadalajara, Mexico City, Puebla and Laguna respectively competed for the title.

In May 2024, Max Star began teaming up with Futuro and Neón, forming the stable Los Viajeros Del Espacio. On July 9, Max Star won his first professional title in his career in which he, Futuro and Hombre Bala Jr. won the Mexican National Trios Championship.

== Championships and accomplishments ==
- Consejo Mundial de Lucha Libre
  - Mexican National Trios Championship (1 time) – with Futuro and Hombre Bala Jr. (Note: The Mexican National Trios Championship is sanctioned by the Mexico City wrestling commission but under the control of CMLL who make the day to day decisions.)

== Lucha de Apuesta record ==
Winner (wager)	Loser (wager)	Location	Event	Date	Notes
Max Star (mask)	Pólvora (mask)	Mexico City	Homenaje a Dos Leyendas 2026	March 20, 2026	(Note: They were the last two competitors in an eight-man Lucha de Apuesta "reverse cibernetico", also featuring Hombre Bala Jr., El Coyote, Cancerbero, Virus, Calavera Jr. I & Calavera Jr. II)
