= Los Infernales =

Professional wrestling group

Stable
- Members: Averno; Euforia; Mephisto
- Name: Los Nuevo Infernales
- Former members: El Satánico; MS-1; Pirata Morgan; Espectro Jr. Belcebu; Masakre; MS-1 Jr; MS-2 II; Último Guerrero; Rey Bucanero; Tarzan Boy; Máscara Magica; Nosferatu; Virus (Unofficial); Hechicero
- Debut: 1983

Los Infernales (Spanish for "the Infernals") is a Mexican professional wrestling group, called a stable. The stable was created in 1984 and consisted of El Satánico, MS-1 and Espectro Jr. A later version where Pirata Morgan replaced Espectro Jr. is considered the "classic" Infernales team that helped popularize the "Trios" team concept in lucha libre. MS-1, Satánico and Pirata Morgan were both the first Mexican National Trios Champions and the first CMLL World Trios Champions.

A later version of Los Infernales, Los Nuevo Infernales became the stable known as Los Guerreros del Infierno after they turned on Satánico and formed a rival stable. The current version of Los Infernales consists of Euforia, Mephisto and Averno.

== History ==
In the early 1980s the trios concept became very popular in Mexico, spearheaded by the trio called Los Misioneros de Muerte ("The Missionaries of Death") who worked for rival promotion Universal Wrestling Association (UWA). EMLL decided to create a trio of rudos (villains in lucha libre) to capitalize on the popularity of the trios phenomenon. MS-1, El Satánico and Espectro Jr. were chosen to form Los Infernales ("The Infernals"). Due to various injuries Espectro Jr. was forced to retire from wrestling all together, leaving Los Infernales one man short. Satánico and MS-1 were briefly paired up with a wrestler called Belcebu ("Beelzebub") but the trio just did not work well together (allegedly only lasting for 2 matches).

=== Sátanico, MS-1 and Pirata Morgan ===
Belcebu was replaced with Pirata Morgan and the trio of MS-1, Satánico and Pirata Morgan quickly became one of the most successful Trios of its time. In March 1985 Los Infernales participated in a tournament to determine the first ever Mexican National Trios Champions; Los Infernales defeated the two teams in the preliminary rounds to qualify for the finals. In the finals Los Infernales defeated Los Brazos ("the Arms"; El Brazo, Brazo de Oro and Brazo de Plata) to become the first ever Mexican National Trios champions. That match was just the first match in a long running Inferlanes/Brazos storyline that would run off and on over the next decade. Los Brazos won the initial feud when they defeated Los Infernales for the Mexican Nations Trios Title on December 8, 1985. In October 1986, Pirata Morgan left the group to form a new group called Los Bucaneros, in his place Los Infernales recruited Masakre to be their third member. On March 20, 1987, MS-1 and Masakre teamed up to defeat Los Hermanos Dinamita (Cien Caras and Máscara Año 2000) to win the Mexican National Tag Team Championship, starting a feud with Los Hermanos Dinamita. while MS-1 and Masakre worked as a tag team, Satánico focused more and more on singles competition, which meant that Los Infernales made fewer appearances as a trio. MS-1 and Masakre defended the Mexican National Tag Team titles for just over a year until losing them to Atlantis and Ángel Azteca on April 6, 1988. El Satánico left Los Infernales to focus on his singles career, while MS-1 and Masakre began arguing, then fighting after the two of them lost the tag team titles thus ending Los Infernales. MS-1 and Masakre faced off in a series of matches, culminating with a headline Luchas de Apuestas match at Arena Mexico that MS-1 won.

In the early 1990s Los Infernales reformed, reuniting MS-1, Satánico and Pirata Morgan. The trio participated in the tournament to crown the first ever CMLL World Trios Champions. Los Infernales won the tournament, defeating Los Brazos in the finals to become the first ever CMLL World Trios Champions on November 22, 1991. Former Infernales member Masakre had formed his own group, Los Intocables ("The Untouchables") consisting of himself, Pierroth Jr. and Jaque Mate ("Checkmate"). Los Intocables were immediately paired with Los Infernales to create a rudos vs. rudos storyline, playing off both the championship chase and the history between the two groups. On March 22, 1992 Los Intocables won the CMLL World Trios Title, however Los Infernales got the final victory in their feud as they defeated Los Intocables for the championship on September 20, 1992. After the storyline with Los Intocables ended Los Infernales renewed their rivalry with Los Brazos, facing off in several main events that drew sell-out crowds all over Mexico. On April 6, 1993 Los Brazos won the CMLL World Trios Title from Los Infernales; a victory that only helped increase the intensity of the rivalry. The Infernales / Brazos feud did not end with a conclusive victory for either side but rather slowed down and then stopped when Los Infernales split up in the mid 1990s. Both Satánico and Pirata Morgan left CMLL for periods of time to work for Asistencia Asesoría y Administración, CMLL's main rival and in 1996 MS-1 left CMLL for good.

After leaving CMLL MS-1 became a wrestling promoter, promoting shows in smaller arenas around Naucalpan, while also forming a new Los Infernales trio on the Mexican Independent circuit, teaming with his son who wrestled as "MS-1 Jr." and "MS-2", who was often played by various local wrestlers and not one specific person. By the end of the 1990s MS-1 quietly retired from wrestling.

=== Los Nuevo Infernales ===
In the late 1990s Satánico reformed Los Infernales, recruiting the nephew of Pirata Morgan, Rey Bucanero and Último Guerrero to form Los Nuevo Infernales ("The New Infernals"). The trio won the Copa de Arena Mexico Tournament in 1999, but did not win any titles. After working together for just under a year Bucanero and Guerrero turned on Satánico, kicking him out of Los Nuevo Infernales, replacing him with Tarzan Boy. Satánico formed his own Infernales, the storyline was that he used his "satanic influences" to turn Rencor Latino into Averno ("Hell") and Astro Rey Jr. into Mephisto to form Los Infernales and fight Los Nuevo Infernales. When Tarzan Boy was injured, Los Nuevo Infernales brought in Máscara Mágica to bolster the group.

The storyline between Los Infernales and Los Nuevo Infernales came to a head when the two teams, seven men all together, faced off in a steel cage match where the winners would earn the right to the name "Los Infernales" and the last man in the cage would lose either his mask or his hair. On September 28, 2001, at the CMLL 68th Anniversary Show, Satánico's team won the right to the Infernales name and forced Máscara Mágica to unmask. After losing the match Guerrero, Bucanero and Tarzan Boy became known collectively as Los Guerreros del Infierno ("The Infernal Soldiers"). On June 23, 2002, Satánico, Averno and Mephisto defeated the trio of Mr. Niebla, Olímpico and Safari to win the Mexican National Trios Championship. Los Infernales would only hold the Trios title for approximately three months before losing it to La Familia de Tijuana (Damián 666, Halloween and Nicho el Millonario). Averno and Mephisto turned on Satánico shortly after the title loss and formed their own group known as La Trada del Terror ("The Trio of Terror") along with Ephesto.

In 2007 Satánico reformed Los Infernales for the second time, teaming with young wrestlers that had recently been repackaged to more "heelish" images, Nosferatu and Euforia. The trios did not approach the success of the previous incarnations of Los Infernales, working mainly lower to mid-card matches; the group intended to give the two young wrestlers more ring experience and further training under Satánico. In 2009 Satánico announced that he was reducing the number of shows he would work to focus on his wrestling school, as a result Los Infernales teamed up with Virus as the de facto leader of Los Infernales when Satánico was not around. On November 19, 2009, CMLL unveiled a new group called Los Cancerberos del Infierno ("The Infernal Cerberi") which both Virus and Euforia were members of. With the start of the new group, Los Infernales quietly disbanded.

=== 2020s revival ===
on September 24, 2021, at the CMLL 88th Anniversary Show, Satánico reformed Los Infernales for a third time, in the aftermath of Hechicero defeating Último Guerrero for the CMLL World Heavyweight Championship. Although Hechicero does not usually have anyone second him, he made an exception for Satánico, because of his long running rivalry with Guerrero. Post-match, Hechicero accepted Satánico's invitation to join Los Infernales, alongside Euforia and Mephisto. He led the team to winning the CMLL World Trios Championship on September 3, 2022 at the annual Noche De Campeones event. That same year, Averno returned to CMLL after a stint in AAA and occasionally teamed with the group as an associate member.

On June 2, 2023, Los Infernales started arguing during a title defence, causing them to lose the match and the trios championships. Hechicero immediately quit the group in frustration, starting a rivalry that culminated in him taking Euforia's mask in a Lucha de Apuestas match at the CMLL 91st Anniversary Show. After Hechicero's exit, Averno was absorbed back into the team as a full-time member and de-facto leader. This version of the team in-turn regained the CMLL World Trios titles at the 2024 Noche De Campeones show on September 27, and lost them the following May to a revived El Sky Team led by Averno's eternal rival Mistico.

This decade also saw the introduction of a Las Infernales team of luchadoras, who shared the common trait of being trained by Satánico: Dark Silueta, Zeuxis, Lluvia & Valkiria.

== Championships and accomplishments ==
Consejo Mundial de Lucha Libre (CMLL)

Sátanico, MS-1 and Espectro Jr.

- Mexican National Middleweight Championship (1 time) - Espectro Jr.
- NWA World Light Heavyweight Championship (1 time) - Satanico
- NWA World Middleweight Championship (3 times) - Satanico
- UWA World Middleweight Championship - Satanico

Sátanico, MS-1 and Pirata Morgan

- CMLL World Trios Championship (2 times, inaugural)
- Mexican National Trios Championship (1 time, inaugural) (Note: The Mexican National championships are sanctioned by the Mexico City boxing and wrestling commission. This particular title is promoted by CMLL.)
- NWA World Light Heavyweight Championship (1 time) - Satanico
- CMLL World Middleweight Championship (1 time) - Satanico

Sátanico, MS-1 and Masakre

- Mexican National Tag Team Championship (1 time) – MS-1 and Masakre
- NWA World Light Heavyweight Championship (2 times) - MS-1
- Distrito Federal Heavyweight Championship (1 time) - MS-1

Sátanico, Último Guerrero and Rey Bucanero

- Copa de Arena Mexico Tournament: 1999
- Torneo Siglo XXI 2000 - Último Guerrero
- Carnaval Increible Trios tournament - Último Guerrero, Rey Bucanero and Mr. Niebla
- CMLL World Tag Team Championship (1 time) - Último Guerrero and Rey Bucanero

Sátanico, Averno and Mephisto

- Mexican National Trios Championship (1 time)
- CMLL World Trios Championship #1 contendership tournament
- CMLL World Welterweight Championship (1 time) - Satanico

Hechicero, Mephisto and Euforia

- CMLL World Trios Championship (1 time)
- CMLL World Heavyweight Champion (1 time) - Hechicero
- Gran Alternativa - Euforia and El Coyote
- Mexican National Heavyweight Championship (1 time) - Euforia
- Copa Dinastías (2022) - Euforia and Soberano Jr.

Averno, Mephisto and Euforia

- CMLL World Trios Championship (1 time)
- CMLL World Light Heavyweight Champion (1 time) - Averno
- NWA World Historic Light Heavyweight Championship (1 time) - Averno
- Copa Infernal - Averno

International Wrestling Revolution Group (IWRG)

- Copa Higher Power: 1999 - Astro Rey Jr., Máscara Mágica, Rey Bucanero, El Satánico and Último Guerrero
