= Masakre =

Mexican professional wrestler

- Masakre in 1993

Personal information
- Born: Aristóteles Radamés Coccó Flores; May 13, 1954 Mexico City, Mexico
- Died: April 12, 2012 (aged 57) Charlotte, North Carolina, United States

Professional wrestling career
- Ring name(s): Drakula; Masakre; MS-2; Yeti
- Billed height: 1.86 m (6 ft 1 in)
- Billed weight: 100 kg (220 lb)
- Trained by: Lázaro García; Rafael Salamanca; Raúl Reyes
- Debut: May 1, 1983
- Retired: No later than 2000

Aristóteles Radamés Coccó Flores (May 13, 1954 – April 12, 2012) was a Mexican professional wrestler best known for working under the ring name Masakre (Spanish for Massacre) in Consejo Mundial de Lucha Libre (CMLL). As Masakre he was a member of the wrestling group Los Infernales along with MS-1 and El Satánico and a founding member of the group Los Intocables along with Pierroth, Jr. and Jaque Mate. By the mid-1990s Coccó began working for Asistencia Asesoría y Administración (AAA) where he used a variety of more comical ring personas such as Drakula, Yeti and Coco Rosa

== Professional wrestling career ==
Aristóteles Radames Cocco Flores made his professional wrestling debut in 1983 under the ring name "Masakre". In his debut year he was paired up with MS-1 and given the ring persona of "MS-2"; Coccó was not the first, not the last wrestler to team with MS-1 under the name "MS-2", but the team would later lead to Masakre being brought in to replace Pirata Morgan as part of Los Infernales along with MS-1 and El Satánico. Masakre and MS-1 teamed up to defeat Los Hermanos Dinamita (Cien Caras and Máscara Año 2000) to win the Mexican National Tag Team Championship. MS-1 and Masakre defended the Mexican National Tag Team titles for just over a year until losing them to Atlantis and Ángel Azteca on April 6, 1988. El Satánico left Los Infernales as he began focusing more on singles matches and MS-1 and Masakre began arguing, then fighting after the two of them lost the tag team titles thus ending Los Infernales. MS-1 and Masakre faced off in a series of matches, culminating with a headline Luchas de Apuestas, hair vs. hair match at Arena Mexico that MS-1 won. After Los Infernales split up Masakre formed a Trio with Pierroth, Jr. and Jaque Mate, called Los Intocables (the Untouchables). Los Intocables feuded with Los Infernale, winning and losing the CMLL World Trios Championship from Los Infernales.

By the mid-1990s Los Intocables had broken up and Masakre had left CMLL to work for Asistencia Asesoría y Administración (AAA). Initially he worked under the ring name Drakula, portraying a vampire character. Later on he was repackaged as Yeti, complete with a furry white full bodysuit that gave the appearance of being an actual Yeti. Flores disappeared from the wrestling scene altogether.

== Death ==
Coccó died from spinal cancer on April 12, 2012.

== Championships and accomplishments ==
- Consejo Mundial de Lucha Libre
  - CMLL World Trios Championship (1 time) – with Pierroth, Jr. and Jaque Mate (Los Intocables)
  - Mexican National Tag Team Championship (1 time) – with MS-1

== Luchas de Apuestas record ==
Winner (wager)	Loser (wager)	Location	Event	Date	Notes
MS-2 (mask)	Pájaro de Fuego (mask)	Querétaro, Querétaro	Live event	1982	
Masakre (mask)	Herodes (hair)	Mexico City	Live event	N/A	
Kiss (mask)	Masakre (mask)	Mexico City	Live event	N/A	
MS-1 (hair)	Masakre (hair)	Mexico City	Live event	N/A	
El Faraón and Ringo Mendoza (hair)	MS-1 and Masakre (hair)	Mexico City	Live event	N/A	
Masakre (hair)	MS-1 (hair)	Mexico City	Live event	N/A	
Pirata Morgan (hair)	Masakre (hair)	Mexico City	Live event	N/A	
