= Mexican National Trios Championship =

Professional wrestling trios tag team championship

- One of the three identical championship belts

Details
- Promotion: Consejo Mundial de Lucha Libre
- Date established: March 10, 1985
- Current champions: Los Herederos (Felino Jr., Hijo del Stuka Jr., and El Cobarde)
- Date won: June 16, 2025
Statistics
- First champions: Los Infernales (El Satánico, MS-1 and Pirata Morgan)
- Most reigns: As a team: Los Reyes de la Atlantida (Atlantis, Delta and Guerrero Maya Jr.) (3); Individually: Atlantis, Delta and Volador Jr. (4)
- Longest reign: Blue Panther, Fuerza Guerrera and El Signo (1728 days)
- Shortest reign: Los Payasos (26 days)

The Mexican National Trios Championship (Campeonato Nacional de Tríos in Spanish) is a three-man tag team professional wrestling championship, sanctioned by the "Comisión de Box y Lucha Libre Mexico D.F." (Mexico City Boxing and Wrestling Commission), which oversees all matches where the championship is defended. Since its creation in 1985 the championship has been promoted by several major Mexican wrestling promotions, Empresa Mexicana de Lucha Libre (EMLL), Asistencia Asesoría y Administración (AAA) and is currently promoted by Consejo Mundial de Lucha Libre (CMLL, formerly EMLL). The change from promotion to promotion was approved by the commission if the trios champions left one promotion to work for the other. As it is a professional wrestling championship, it is not won or lost competitively, but instead by the decision of the bookers of a wrestling promotion. The title is awarded to a team after the team "wins" a match to maintain the illusion that professional wrestling is a competitive sport. Up until late 2021, all championship matches promoted in Mexico took place under best two-out-of-three falls rules.

In the early 1980s the six-man tag team match became very popular in Mexico, to the point where that match format is the most prevalent format in Lucha Libre today. The Universal Wrestling Association created the UWA World Trios Championship in 1984 and the Boxing and Wrestling Commission created the Mexican National Trios Championship in 1985, making it only the second Trios championship in Mexico. Control of the championship was given to EMLL, the UWA's main rival at the time, with the commission retaining oversight and approval of the championship matches. In 1993 then champions Los Infernales ("The Infernal Ones"; MS-1, Pirata Morgan, and El Satánico) left EMLL to join AAA, taking the trios championship with them after approval by the commission. In the late 1990s the championship was not promoted on a regular basis by AAA and appeared inactive until the champions, Blue Panther, Fuerza Guerrera, and El Signo, joined CMLL in 2001 and lost the championship to a CMLL team. From that point forward the championship has been controlled by CMLL once more. The current champions are Los Herederos (Felino Jr., Hijo del Stuka Jr., and El Cobarde), who are in their first reign as a team and individually. They won the titles by defeating Los Viajeros Del Espacios (Futuro, Hombre Bala Jr. and Max Star) at CMLL Lunes Clasico on June 16, 2025 in Puebla, Mexico; they are the 46th overall champions. Los Reyes de la Atlantida hold the record for most reigns as a team, with three reigns in total, while Atlantis, Delta and Volador Jr. holds the individual record with four reigns each.

== History ==
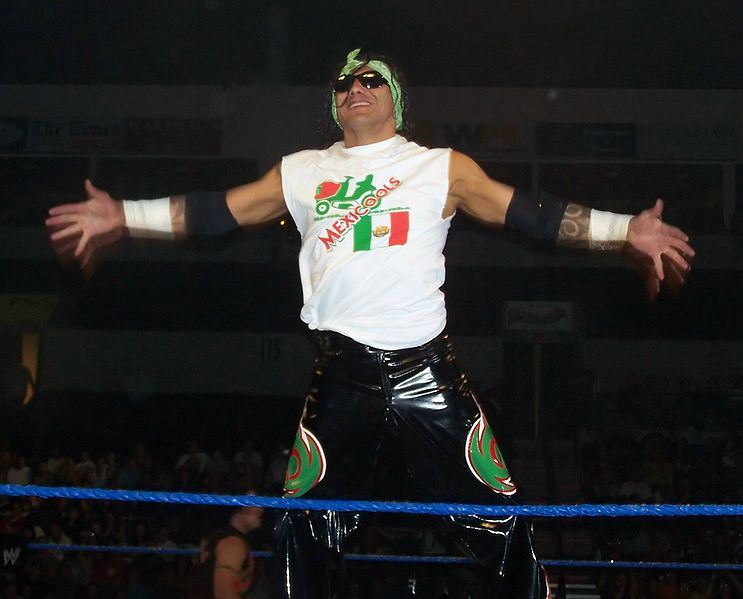
Nicho el Millonario, one third of the 22nd Mexican National Trios Champion along with Halloween and Damián 666

With the emergence of trios (tag teams consisting of three people) such as Los Misioneros de la Muerte, Los Brazos and more, the six-man tag team match became increasingly popular in the early 1980s. Its popularity led to the trios format becoming the most prevalent match format in Lucha libre to this day. The popularity led to the creation of the first trios championship in Mexico when the Universal Wrestling Association (UWA) created the UWA World Trios Championship in 1984. The Mexican National Trios Championship was created in 1985, at the request of Empresa Mexicana de Lucha Libre (EMLL) and endorsed by the Mexico City Boxing and Wrestling Commission. The commission granted EMLL the rights to promote the championship, which meant that CMLL had control over the everyday use of the championship, determining which storylines the title were being used in, who were allowed to challenge for the title and how to use it in a public relations sense. The Commission would oversee the rule and approves any championship change that EMLL proposed.

The finals of the tournament to crown the first champions saw Los Infernales ("The Infernal Ones"; the team of MS-1, Pirata Morgan, and El Satánico) defeat Los Brazos ("The Arms"; El Brazo, Brazo de Oro, and Brazo de Plata) to become the first champions. Los Brazos would win the championship 9 months later but only hold them for a short while. In February 1986 Los Brazos became the first team to hold the title twice as they defeated Dos Caras, Villano III, and Villano IV for the championship. EMLL rebranded themselves "Consejo Mundial de Lucha Libre" ("World Wrestling Council") in 1991 and created the CMLL World Trios Championship but also kept the rights to the Mexican National Trios Championship. In 1992 Asistencia Asesoría y Administración (AAA) was formed by a group of officials and wrestlers who broke away from CMLL. The then-reigning champions Cien Caras, Máscara Año 2000, and Universo 2000 left CMLL to join AAA and brought the Mexican National Trios Championship with them as it was not a CMLL owned title. The Commission granted AAA the right to control the title from 1992 on, later on when AAA began working with Promotora Mexicana de Lucha Libre (PROMELL) both promotions were allowed used the Trios title by the commission. In 1996 AAA and PROMELL stopped working together and the title was vacated. PROMELL was granted the right to promote the title from that point on and held a tournament to crown new champions. Blue Panther, Fuerza Guerrera, and El Signo won the tournament and would go on to hold the titles for 1,728 days, although for the majority of the time the three did not team up and the Trios championship was inactive. In 2001 the trio worked a couple of matches for CMLL, just long enough for them to lose the championship to Mr. Niebla, Olímpico, and Safari, bringing the championship back under CMLL's control, where it has remained ever since.

On June 13, 2003 a championship match between champions La Familia de Tijuana (Nicho el Millonario, Damián 666, and Halloween) and Los Nuevo Infernales (Sátanico, Averno, and Mephisto), ended with La Familia being disqualified. The disqualification meant that the titles would change hands, but Los Nuevo Infernales refused to win the championship in such a manner. A rematch was set up for June 20, but Nicho el Millonario did not show up for the match. CMLL held an eight-team tournament to determine the next championship trio, ending with El Felino, Safari and Volador Jr. become the 23rd Trios champions. In 2010 Máscara Dorada teamed up with Stuka Jr., and Metro to win the Trios championship, making Dorada a quadruple champion as he also held the CMLL World Super Lightweight Championship, CMLL World Trios Championship, and the CMLL World Welterweight Championship at the time. In November, 2010 Dorada suffered a knee injury and relinquished his portion of the Mexican National Trios Championship. Delta was selected as his replacement via a fan vote, but the team lost the trios championship in the first defense against the team of Ángel de Oro, Diamante (who were the other two options for Dorada's replacement) and Rush.

== Rules ==
The title is a "National" title which means that non-Mexican citizens are prohibited from challenging or holding the championship. As it is a professional wrestling championship, it is not won legitimately; it is instead won via a scripted ending to a match. The fact that the championship is a "trios" championship means that it is restricted to Tag teams with three members. The championship is generally not allowed to be defended in any other type of match than a regular match, as is the case for all the Mexican National titles. The commission has been inconsistent on enforcing the rules, in one case they stripped Psicosis of the Mexican National Middleweight Championship for defending it in a hardcore match, in another case they allowed the Mexican National Heavyweight Championship to change hands in a Steel cage match. On occasion single fall title matches have taken place, for example when promoting CMLL title matches in Japan, conforming to the traditions of the local promotion. (Note: An example of this was Bushi winning the CMLL World Welterweight Championship in a one-fall match on a New Japan Pro-Wrestling show.)

== Reigns ==
The current champions are Los Herederos (Felino Jr., Hijo del Stuka Jr., and El Cobarde), who are in their first reign as a team and individually. They won the titles by defeating Los Viajeros Del Espacios (Futuro, Hombre Bala Jr. and Max Star) at CMLL Lunes Clasico on June 16, 2025 in Puebla, Mexico; they are the 45th overall champions. Los Reyes de la Atlantida hold the record for most reigns as a team, with three, while Atlantis, Delta and Volador Jr. have all held the championship on four separate occasions. Blue Panther, Fuerza Guerrera and El Signo is the team with the longest reign of 1,728 days while Los Payasos and the trio of Dos Caras, Villano III and Villano IV both held the title for only 26 days, which is the shortest time of any championship team.

Several championship teams have lost the championship in their first defense, while the teams of Sagrado, La Sombra, Volador Jr., and El Felino, Safari, Volador Jr. both are credited with six successful title defenses before losing the championship, the most of any of the 39 championship teams. In 1991 the Commission allowed El Ninja to replace the injured Leono during a championship defense, helping Los Thundercats retain the title against the team of Rocky Santana, El Gallego and Romano Garcia.

== Tournaments ==
=== 1985 ===
Records from 1985 are not clear on which trios teams participated in the tournament to determine the first ever Mexican National Trios Championship, only a few matches were clearly identified as part of the tournament, the earliest of which was a January 25, 1985 match in Arena Coliseo that saw Los Infernales (MS-1, Pirata Morgan, Satánico) defeat El Enfermero Jr., Herodes and Jerry Estrada to advance in the tournament. Records also indicate that trios consisting of Popitekus, Panico and Zorro de Oro; Talisman, La Fiera, and Mocho Cota; Atlantis, Stuka and Acertijo; Chamaco Valaguez, Impacto and Águila Solitaria were in the tournament, but were all eliminated before the finals. On February 10, 1985 Los Infernales defeated Los Brazos to win the championship.

=== 2003 ===
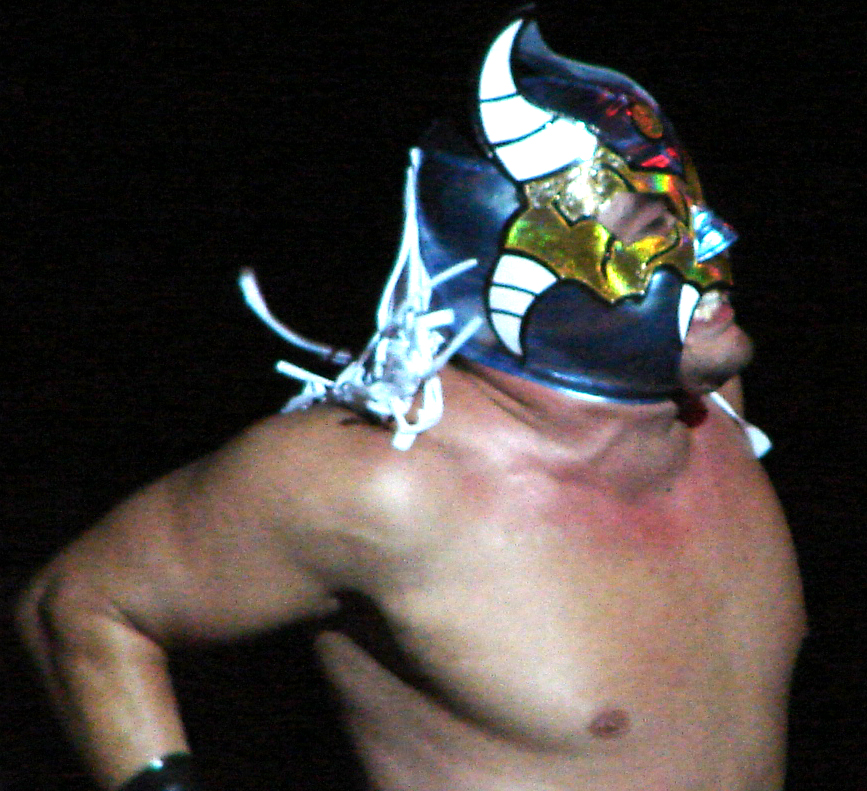
Averno, part of Los Infernales who competed in the tournament.

After Nicho el Millonario did not show up for a scheduled title match CMLL decided to vacate the championship and left it vacant for approximately five months. In late November 2003, CMLL held an eight-team, three-week tournament to crown new champions. Most of the teams in the tournament had not teamed up on a regular basis prior to the show, except for Los Nuevo Infernales. In the end, the team of El Felino, Safari and Volador Jr., who was paired up for the tournament, defeated Alan Stone, Super Crazy, and Zumbido to win the titles.

Tournament brackets

First round
El Felino, Safari, and Volador Jr.	W
Black Warrior, Doctor X, and Olímpico
Ricky Marvin, Sagrado, and Virus	W
La Alianza (Hooligan, Ramstein, and Sangre Azteca)
Blue Panther, Tigre Blanco, and Tony Rivera
Alan Stone, Super Crazy, and Zumbido	W
Los Infernales (Averno, Mephisto, El Satánico)	W
Loco Max, Nitro, and Violencia)

Semi-finals
El Felino, Safari and Volador Jr.	W
Ricky Marvin, Sagrado and Virus
Alan Stone, Super Crazy and Zumbido	W
Los Infernales (Averno, Mephisto, El Satánico)

Final
El Felino, Safari and Volador Jr.	W
Alan Stone, Super Crazy and Zumbido

=== 2009 ===
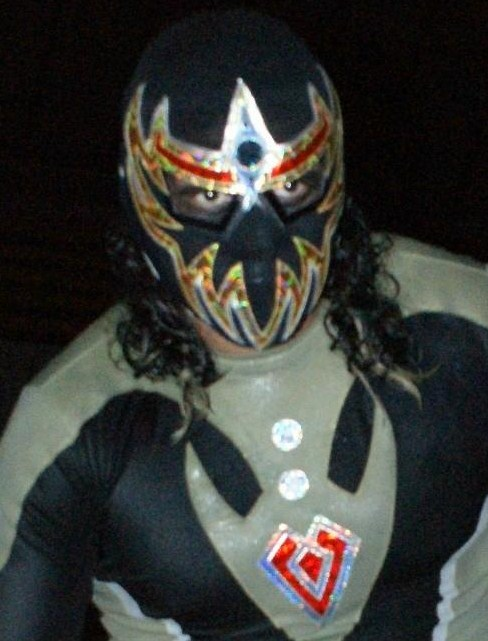
Máscara Dorada, part of the trio that won the 2009 championship tournament.

On December 19, 2009, it was announced by the Comisión de Box y Lucha Libre Mexico D.F. that Poder Mexica had been stripped of the Mexican National Trios Championship because Black Warrior had left CMLL, breaking up the team. At the same time, they announced an eight-team tournament to crown a new trios champion. The top half of the bracket took place on December 22, 2009 and the bottom half of the bracket took place on December 29. In the top bracket the team of Máscara Dorada, Stuka Jr. and Metro defeated Guerreros Tuareg (Arkangel de la Muerte, Loco Max, and Skándalo) in the first round and Los Cancerberos del Infierno (Virus, Euforia, and Pólvora) in the second round to qualify for the finals. The bottom bracket took place on December 29, 2009 and saw the team of Poder Mexica (Sangre Azteca, Dragón Rojo Jr., and Misterioso Jr.) defeat Fabian El Gitano, Máximo, and Rouge, and then Delta, Leono, and Valiente to qualify for the final. On January 6, 2010 Máscara Dorada, Stuka Jr. and Metro defeated Poder Mexica to become the new Mexican National Trios Champions.

First round
Máscara Dorada, Stuka Jr., and Metro	W
Los Guerreros de Tuareg (Arkangel de la Muerte, Loco Max, and Skándalo )
Los Ángeles (Ángel Azteca Jr., Ángel de Oro, and Ángel de Plata)
Los Cancerberos del Infierno (Virus, and Euforia, and Polvora)	W
Delta, Leono, and Valiente	W
Pegasso, Rey Cometa, and Diamante
Poder Mexica (Sangre Azteca, Dragón Rojo Jr., and Misterioso Jr.)	W
Fabian El Gitano, Máximo, and Rouge

Semi-finals
Máscara Dorada, Stuka Jr., and Metro	W
Los Cancerebros del Infierno
Delta, Leono, and Valiente
Poder Mexica	W

Final
Máscara Dorada, Stuka Jr., and Metro	W
Poder Mexica

=== 2010 ===
Much like the previous year, one-third of the reigning Mexican National Trios Champions was unable to further help defend the title. This year, CMLL resolved the situation differently, but still managed to organize in a tournament. The champions, Mascara Dorada, Stuka Jr., and Metro, successfully defended their championship on November 15, 2010, in Arena Puebla. Dorada suffered an ankle injury during the course of the match. Citing both the injury (which would keep him out a month) and, more so, the demands of his other three championships, Mascara Dorada vacated his share of the titles three days later. CMLL broke with the precedent of forcing the entire team to vacate the titles and instead declared a web poll would determine a replacement for Mascara Dorada. Voting was held for over two weeks on CMLL.com.

- Delta - 41.52%
- Ángel de Oro - 39.20%
- Diamante - 19.28%

CMLL appeared to waver about the winner becoming the champion or just joining Stuka and Metro for a title match. CMLL's website indicated Delta won the championship, but Delta's team did not wear the championship belts prior to their first title match. Concurrent with the poll, CMLL started running an eight-team, three-week tournament to find new challengers for the new champions. Guadalajara regulars Palacio Negro, and Metal Blanco made their Mexico City debuts and qualified for the finals alongside Sagrado, but the team of Rush and the two poll losers, Ángel de Oro and Diamante, won the tournament and would go on to win the championship.

Tournament brackets

First round
Rey Cometa, Molotov, and Fuego
Nosferatu, Euforia, and Pólvora	W
Los Guerreros Tuareg (Loco Max, Skandalo, and Arkangel de la Muerte)
Sagrado, Palacio Negro, and Metal Blanco	W
Los Cancerberos del Infierno (Virus, Raziel, and Cancerbero)	W
Ángel Azteca Jr., Ángel de Plata, and Guerrero Maya Jr.
Rush, Diamante, and Ángel de Oro	W
Durango Kid, Puma King, and Tiger Kid

Semi-finals
Nosferatu, Euforia and Pólvora
Sagrado, Palacio Negro and Metal Blanco	W
Los Cancerberos del Infierno (Virus, Raziel, and Cancerbero)
Rush, Diamante, and Ángel de Oro	W

Final
Sagrado, Palacio Negro, and Metal Blanco
Rush, Diamante, and Ángel de Oro	W
