= Pirata Morgan =

Mexican professional wrestler

Personal information
- Born: Pedro Ortiz Villanueva; July 29, 1962 (age 64) Ciudad Nezahualcoyotl, Mexico State

Professional wrestling career
- Ring name(s): Siki Ozama II; Pedro Ortiz; Ramón Morgan; Pirata Morgan; Violencia
- Billed height: 1.76 m (5 ft 9 1/2 in)
- Billed weight: 97 kg (214 lb)
- Trained by: Hombre Bala; Rafael Salamanca
- Debut: February 7, 1979; Cuernavaca, Morelos, Mexico

Pedro Ortiz Villanueva (born July 29, 1962) is a Mexican professional wrestler and wrestling trainer, who is best known under the ring name Pirata Morgan. Ortiz made his professional wrestling debut in 1979 and has in the last 20 years worked for Consejo Mundial de Lucha Libre (CMLL), Asistencia Asesoría y Administración (AAA), International Wrestling Revolution Group (IWRG) and is active on the Mexican Independent circuit, having left AAA in early 2009 after working for the company for over 10 years. Ortiz's ring name comes from the name of Captain Henry Morgan, a 16th-century Pirate noted for his cruelty.

Pirata Morgan has been a member of the Trio Los Infernales from the mid-1980s to the mid-1990s and as part of that group he was one third of the first Mexican National Trios Champions and CMLL World Trios Champions. He was also the founder of the group Los Bucaneros (the Buccaneers), teaming with other family members who all used a "Pirate" Ring persona. In 1981 Ortiz suffered an injury during a match where he lost his right eye and has wrestled wearing an eyepatch ever since.

== Professional wrestling career ==
Pedro Ortiz Villanueva made his professional wrestling debut on February 7, 1979, using the ring name "Siki Ozama II", teaming with Siki Ozama I. Over the next year Ortiz wrestled as "Pedro Ortiz" and later on "Ramón Morgan" as he gained in-ring experience. In December 1981, Ortiz worked a match against El Jalisco at Arena Colosseum Tapatía Perl, Ortiz won the first fall of the match, El Jalisco won the second fall before Ortiz suffered a terrible injury. El Jalisco was on the floor outside the ring and Ortiz leapt over the top rope, hoping to hit El Jalisco, but his opponent was out of position and Ortiz hit the ground face first. The impact of the fall burst Ortiz' right eye, spraying a mist of blood over the floor and the front row. Initially it was feared that Ortiz would not survive but after medical attention it became clear that he would survive, but had to have the remnants of his right eye surgically removed. When Ortiz returned to the ring he had to wear an eyepatch over his missing eye and used this as the impetus to change his ring persona, Pedro Ortiz became Pirata Morgan, a pirate ring persona named after 16th-century pirate Henry Morgan. On August 7, 1983, Pirata Morgan won his first singles title when he defeated Halcón Ortiz to win the Mexican National Heavyweight Championship. Morgan would hold and defend the title for 154 days until he lost to Rayo de Jalisco Jr. on January 8, 1984.

=== Los Infernales ===
In 1985 Pirata Morgan was chosen to replace Espectro Jr. as a member of Los Infernales together with Satánico and MS-1. The trio of MS-1, Satánico, and Pirata Morgan quickly became one of the most successful Trios of its time. In March 1985 Los Infernales participated in a tournament to determine the first ever Mexican National Trios Champions; Los Infernales defeated the two teams in the preliminary rounds to qualify for the finals. In the finals Los Infernales defeated Los Brazos ("the Arms"; El Brazo, Brazo de Oro, and Brazo de Plata) to become the first ever Mexican National Trios champions. That match was just the first match in a long running Inferlanes/Brazos storyline that would run off and on over the next decade. Los Brazos won the initial feud when they defeated Los Infernales for the Mexican Nations Trios Title on December 8, 1985.

In October, 1986 Pirata Morgan left the group to form a new group called "Los Bucaneros", teaming with his brother, Hombre Bala (who also worked as Rey Pirata), his nephew Rey Bucanero and a Mini called Piratita Morgan. Los Bucaneros feuded with Los Infernales, who had added Masakre to their ranks, the feud saw Pirata Morgan defeat MS-1 in a Luchas de Apuestas, hair vs. hair match that saw MS-1 shaved bald after the match. On August 30, 1987, Pirata Morgan teamed up with Hombre Bala and Jerry Estrada to win the Mexican National Trios Championship from Kiss, Ringo Mendoza and Rayo de Jalisco Jr. The Trio held the title for 154 days before losing to Los Destructores (the Destroyers; Emilio Charles Jr., Tony Arce and Vulcano). On October 21, 1989, Pirata Morgan defeated former teammate Satánico to win the NWA World Light Heavyweight Champion, holding it for 48 days before losing it to Fabuloso Blondy

In the early 1990s, Los Infernales reformed, reuniting MS-1, Satánico and Pirata Morgan. The trio participated in the tournament to crown the first ever CMLL World Trios Champions. Los Infernales won the tournament, defeating Los Brazo in the finals to become the first ever CMLL World Trios Champions on November 22, 1991. Former Infernales member Masakre had formed his own group, Los Intocables (the Untouchables) consisting of himself, Pierroth Jr. and Jaque Mate (Checkmate). Los Infernales regained the titles when they defeated Los Intocables for the championship on September 20, 1992. After the storyline with Los Intocables ended, Los Infernales renewed their rivalry with Los Brazo, facing off in several main events that drew sell-out crowds all over Mexico. On April 6, 1993, Los Brazo won the CMLL World Trios Title from Los Infernales; a victory that only helped increase the intensity of the rivalry. The Infernales / Brazos feud did not so much with a conclusive victory for either side but rather slowed down and then stopped when Los Infernales split up in the mid-1990s.

=== Asistencia Asesoría y Administración (1995–2009) ===
Pirata Morgan left CMLL in the mid-1990s to join Asistencia Asesoría y Administración (AAA), working both as a wrestler and as a wrestling trainer. On December 12, 1997, Morgan won the IWC World Heavyweight Championship from Máscara Sagrada. (Note: the IWC World Heavyweight Championship was the highest ranking title in AAA at the time.) Pirata Morgan successfully defended the title against Vampiro twice, before losing the belt to La Parka in June 1998. In 1999 Morgan left AAA and began working for International Wrestling Revolution Group (IWRG) where he won the IWRG Intercontinental Heavyweight Championship from Pierroth Jr. on August 1, 1999. By the end of 1999 Pirata Morgan returned to AAA and brought the IWRG Heavyweight title with him; IWRG published a fictitious title change in Japan to explain why Super Parka suddenly held the IWRG Heavyweight title. As Pirata Morgan had the physical belt in his possession he began defending it in AAA, billed as the "IWC World Heavyweight Championship", pretending that it was the same belt that he had held in 1997–1998. Morgan lost the championship to Héctor Garza but quickly regained it in mid-2000, before dropping it for the final time in August 2000. Only days after losing the IWC World Heavyweight Title Morgan teamed up with El Texano to defeat Héctor Garza and Perro Aguayo Jr. for the Mexican National Tag Team Championship. Morgan and Texano would hold the title for 429 days successfully defending it against such teams as Sangre Chicana and La Parka Jr. (twice), Heavy Metal and Perro Aguayo Jr. (twice) and Dos Caras and Dos Caras Jr. (once) before losing the belts to La Parka Jr. and Máscara Sagrada. On December 27, 2003, Pirata Morgan defeated El Zorro to win the Mexican National Heavyweight Championship, almost 20 years after having held it last. Morgan would only hold the title for 39 days before El Zorro regained it. In subsequent years Pirata Morgan has worked more and more with young, low card wrestlers to help improve their skills and less as a serious championship contender.

In 2007 Pirata Morgan introduced a group called Los Piratas to AAA, a group that consisted of Pirata Morgan Jr., Barba Roja, and Drake Morgan. Pirata Morgan would often team with the group and was billed as their father, although only Pirata Morgan Jr. was the only blood relation. In late 2007, Drake Morgan was replaced by El Hijo de Pirata Morgan, legitimately the son of Pirata Morgan.

=== International Wrestling Revolution Group (2009–present) ===
In late 2008 Barba Roja and El Hijo de Pirata Morgan were both cut from AAA. In early 2009 Pirata Morgan left AAA, citing his dissatisfaction with the direction of the company in recent years. Subsequently, Pirata Morgan has worked on the Mexican Independent circuit as well as making appearances for IWRG. On September 30, 2011, Pirata Morgan lost his hair to Hijo de Pirata Morgan in a twelve-man steel cage match. On February 7, 2013, Pirata Morgan, El Hijo de Pirata Morgan and Pirata Morgan Jr. defeated Los Oficiales (Oficial 911, Oficial AK-47 and Oficial Fierro) to win the Distrito Federal Trios Championship. Pirata Morgan, along with Cien Caras Jr., Máscara Año 2000 Jr. and Rayo de Jalisco Jr. competed in a four-way steel cage match billed by IWRG as Prison Fatal ("Deadly Prison"). During the match Hijo de Máscara Año 2000 interfered, which caused Pirata Morgan Jr. to enter the match as well to escalate the rivalry between Los Piratas and Los Capos Junior. The match ended with Pirata Morgan being the last man in the cage and thus had his hair shaved off. On March 24, 2013, Los Piratas won the vacant IWRG Intercontinental Trios Championship, winning a four-way match against Los Oficiales (911, AK-47, and Fierro), La Familia de Tijuana (Mosco X-Fly, Super Nova, and Eterno) and Comandos Elite (Rayan, and Factor) and Máscara Año 2000 Jr. They lost the title to Los Poderosos (Hombre Sin Miedo, Kendor Jr., and Sobredosis) on November 4, only to regain it a week later. On August 9, 2015, Los Piratas lost the IWRG Intercontinental Trios Championship to La Dinastía de la Muerte (Negro Navarro, Trauma I and Trauma II). During the show Pirata Morgan introduced the newest member of Los Piratas, Barbe Roja Jr. ("Red Beard Jr.").

== Family ==
Pedro Ortiz is part of an extended wrestling family that includes his brothers who wrestle as Verdungo and Hombre Bala and sister La Marqueza. Ortiz also has at least one brother who is not a professional wrestler. Ortiz has three children who are also professional wrestlers; two sons wrestle as Pirata Morgan Jr. and El Hijo de Pirata Morgan, and his daughter wrestles as Perla Negra. In storyline terms wrestlers Drake Morgan, Barba Roja, and Hijo de Pirata Morgan have all been billed as sons of Pirata Morgan but are not actually related by blood. Several of his nephews and a niece are also professional wrestlers, using the ring names Rey Bucanero, India Sioux, Hombre Bala Jr., and Corsario.

== Championships and accomplishments ==
- Asistencia Asesoría y Administración
  - IWC World Heavyweight Championship (3 times)
  - Mexican National Tag Team Championship (1 time) – with El Texano (Note: the Mexican National Tag Team Championship is sanctioned by the Mexico City Boxing and Wrestling Commission, but was promoted by AAA at this point in time)
  - Mexican National Heavyweight Championship (1 time) (Note: the Mexican National Heavyweight Championship is sanctioned by the Mexico City Boxing and Wrestling Commission, but was promoted by AAA at this point in time)
- Consejo Mundial de Lucha Libre
  - CMLL World Trios Championship (2 times) – with MS-1 and Satánico (Los Infernales)
  - Distrito Federal Heavyweight Championship (1 time)
  - Mexican National Heavyweight Championship (1 time) (Note: the Mexican National Heavyweight Championship is sanctioned by the Mexico City Boxing and Wrestling Commission, but was promoted by CMLL at this point in time)
  - Mexican National Trios Championship (2 times) – with MS-1 and Satanico (Los Infernales), Jerry Estrada and Hombre Bala
  - NWA World Light Heavyweight Championship (1 time)
- International Wrestling Revolution Group
  - IWRG Intercontinental Heavyweight Championship (1 time)
  - IWRG Intercontinental Tag Team Championship (2 times) – with Hijo de Pirata Morgan
  - IWRG Intercontinental Trios Championship (2 times) – With Pirata Morgan and Pirata Morgan Jr.
  - UWF United States Heavyweight Championship (1 time, current)
  - Gran Legado (2012) – with Hijo de Pirata Morgan
- Mexico State Wrestling and Boxing Commission
  - Distrito Federal Trios Championship (1 time) – with El Hijo de Pirata Morgan and Pirata Morgan Jr.
- Promociones HUMO
  - Copa Dinastías HUMO (2014) - with Hijo del Pirata Morgan

== Luchas de Apuestas record ==
Winner (wager)	Loser (wager)	Location	Event	Date	Notes
Máscara Año 2000 (hair)	Pirata Morgan (hair)	Mexico City	Live event	N/A	
Pirata Morgan (hair)	El Jalisco (hair)	N/A	Live event	N/A	
Pirata Morgan (hair)	La Fiera (hair)	N/A	Live event	N/A	
Pirata Morgan (hair)	El Egipcio (hair)	Mexico City	29. Aniversario de Arena México	April 5, 1984	
El Satánico (hair)	Pirata Morgan (hair)	Mexico City	Live event	N/A	
César Curiel (hair)	Pirata Morgan (hair)	Mexico City	Live event	August 31, 1980	
Pirata Morgan (hair)	Popitekus (hair)	Mexico City	Live event	March 20, 1983	
Pirata Morgan (hair)	César Curiel (hair)	Mexico City	Live event	April 24, 1983	
El Jalisco I (hair)	Pirata Morgan (hair)	Mexico City	Live event	November 12, 1983	
Halcón Ortiz (hair)	Pirata Morgan (hair)	Mexico City	28. Aniversario de Arena México	April 8, 1984	
Pirata Morgan (hair)	MS-1 (hair)	Mexico City	Live event	July 4, 1986	
El Satánico (hair)	Pirata Morgan (hair)	Mexico City	Juicio Final	December 5, 1986	
Pirata Morgan (hair)	Tony Salazar (hair)	Mexico City	EMLL 54th Anniversary Show	September 18, 1987	
El Dandy (hair)	Pirata Morgan (hair)	Mexico City	Live event	September 23, 1988	
Pirata Morgan (hair)	Steve Nelson (hair)	Mexico City	Live event	August 18, 1989	
Aníbal (mask)	Pirata Morgan (hair)	Tlalnepantla, Mexico State	Live event	1990	
El Faraón (hair)	Pirata Morgan (hair)	Mexico City	Live event	November 16, 1990	
Pirata Morgan (hair)	MS-1 (hair)	Mexico City	Live event	March 15, 1991	
Pirata Morgan (hair)	Masakre (hair)	Mexico City	Live event	February 28, 1992	
Vampiro Canadiense (hair)	Pirata Morgan (hair)	Mexico City	Live event	July 17, 1992	
El Satánico (hair)	Pirata Morgan (hair)	Texcoco, Mexico State	Live event	November 26, 1993	
Pirata Morgan (hair)	MS-1 (hair)	Mexico City	Live event	September 29, 1994	
Vampiro Canadiense (hair)	Pirata Morgan (hair)	Azcapotzalco, Distrito Federal	Live event	December 10, 1995	
Héctor Garza (hair)	Pirata Morgan (hair)	Puebla, Puebla	Live event	July 29, 1996	
Antifaz del Norte (mask)	Pirata Morgan (hair)	Monterrey, Nuevo León	Live event	July 27, 1997	
Tarzan Boy (hair)	Pirata Morgan (hair)	Nuevo Laredo, Tamaulipas	Live event	December 22, 1997	
Máscara Sagrada (mask)	Pirata Morgan (hair)	Aguascalientes, Aguascalientes	Live event	April 21, 1998	
Vampiro (hair)	Pirata Morgan (hair)	Houston, Texas	Live event	September 1, 1998	
Máscara Sagrada (mask)	Pirata Morgan (hair)	N/A	Live event	December 1998	
La Parka Jr. (hair)	Pirata Morgan (hair)	Nuevo Laredo, Tamaulipas	Live event	1999	
Sangre Chicana (hair)	Pirata Morgan (hair)	Monterrey, Nuevo León	Live event	September 3, 2000	
Sangre Chicana (hair)	Pirata Morgan (hair)	Acapulco, Guerrero	Triplemanía IX	May 24, 2001	(Note: Match also included El Cobarde.)
Príncipe Arandú (hair)	Pirata Morgan (hair)	Tijuana, Baja California	Live event	December 7, 2001	
Latin Lover (hair)	Pirata Morgan (hair)	Dallas, Texas	Live event	April 13, 2003	
Heavy Metal (hair)	Pirata Morgan (hair)	Naucalpan, Mexico State	Triplemanía XI	June 15, 2003	(Note: Match also included Sangre Chicana and El Texano/)
Villaño III (hair)	Pirata Morgan (hair)	Reynosa, Tamaulipas	Live event	October 28, 2003	
Latin Lover (hair)	Pirata Morgan (hair)	Naucalpan, Mexico State	Guerra de Titanes	December 5, 2004	(Note: Steel cage match that also included Heavy Metal, Hator and La Fiera. Pirata Morgan interfered and was the last man in the cage.)
Sangre Chicana (hair)	Pirata Morgan (hair)	Monterrey, Nuevo León	Live event	October 30, 2005	(Note: Match also included Hator and Estrella Dorada Jr.)
Pirata Morgan (hair)	Potro Jr. (hair)	Monterrey, Nuevo León	Live event	August 4, 2007	
Pirata Morgan (hair)	Hipnosis (hair)	N/A	Live event	September 23, 2007	
Máscara Año 2000 (hair)	Pirata Morgan (hair)	Naucalpan, Mexico State	Live event	December 19, 2010	
Hijo de Pirata Morgan (hair)	Pirata Morgan (hair)	Ciudad Nezahualcóyotl, Mexico State	Live event	September 30, 2011	(Note: Twelve man steel cage match, which also included Barba Roja, Bestia 666, Damián 666, Dr. Wagner Jr., Halloween, El Hijo del Perro Aguayo, Monster Clown, Murder Clown, Pirata Morgan Jr. and Psycho Clown.)
Máscara Año 2000 Jr. (hair)	Pirata Morgan (hair)	Naucalpan, Mexico State	Prison Fatal	March 17, 2013	(Note: Multi-man steel cage match that also included Cien Caras Jr. and Rayo de Jalisco Jr.)
Voltron (hair)	Pirata Morgan (hair)	Guatemala	Live event	May 20, 2018	
