= Ephesto =

Mexican luchador enmascarado

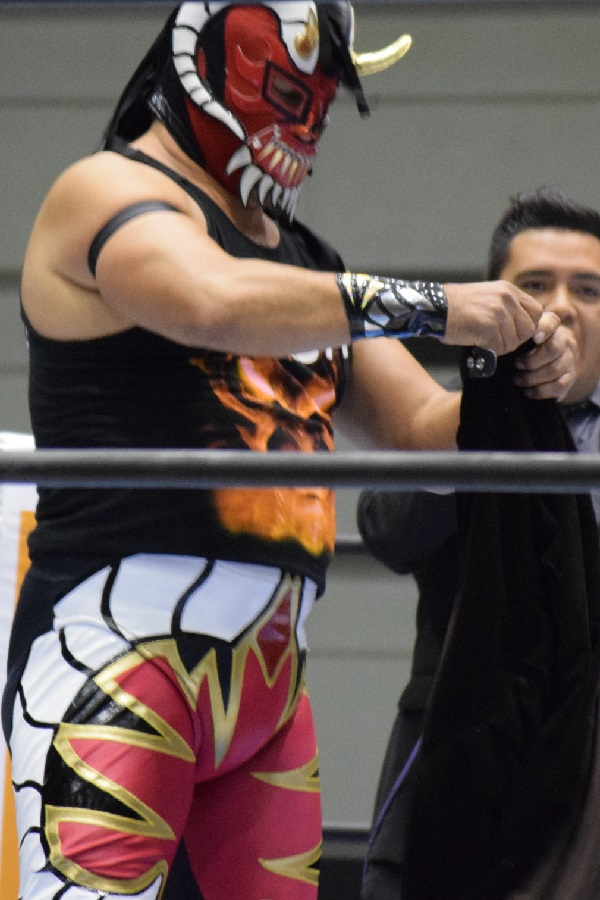
- Ephesto in January 2017

Personal information
- Born: June 10, 1965 (age 61) Gomez Palacio, Durango, Mexico

Professional wrestling career
- Ring name(s): Ephesto; Hefesto; Hombre Sin Nombre; Pantera del Ring/Panterita del Ring; Safari
- Billed height: 1.77 m (5 ft 9 1/2 in)
- Billed weight: 95 kg (209 lb)
- Trained by: Halcon Suriano; Asterión; El Satánico; Blue Panther
- Debut: May 29, 1982

Ephesto (born July 10, 1965) is the best known ring name of a Mexican professional wrestler working for Consejo Mundial de Lucha Libre (CMLL) as Panterita del Ring. His real name has not been officially documented, a tradition in Mexican wrestling where masked wrestlers' real names often are not a matter of public record.

He made his debut in 1982 and worked for almost 20 years as Pantera del Ring with limited success, although he won the Mexican National Tag Team Championship when working for Asistencia Asesoría y Administración (AAA). He later worked as Safari and El Hombre sin Nombre until 2006, when he adopted the ring name "Ephesto", derived from the Spanish name for Hephaestus, the Greek god of fire, Hefesto; his name is sometimes spelled Hefesto in print sources. A founding member of the stable Los Hijos del Infierno ("Sons of the Inferno") with Averno and Mephisto, Ephesto is a former Mexican National Trios Champion, CMLL World Light Heavyweight Champion and CMLL World Trios Champion. He has also wrestled in Japan for New Japan Pro-Wrestling (NJPW).

== Professional wrestling career ==
=== Early career (1982–1991) ===
After training under Halcon Suriano, Asterión, El Satánico and Blue Panther, the wrestler later known as Ephesto made his debut at the age of 16 on May 29, 1982, under the ring persona Pantera del Ring ("The Panther of the Ring"), an enmascarado ("masked wrestler") character with a Blue Panther-inspired mask and trunks. His first recorded match occurred on August 11, 1983, against Chamaco Treviño.

=== Consejo Mundial de Lucha Libre (1991–1992) ===
As Pantera del Ring, sometimes referred to as "Panterita del Ring" ("Little Panther of the Ring"), he signed with Consejo Mundial de Lucha Libre (CMLL) in the early 1990s and began working as a low card tecnicó ("good guy").

=== Asistencia Asesoría y Administración (1992–1997) ===
When then-CMLL head booker Antonio Peña broke off to form the rival wrestling company Asistencia Asesoría y Administración (AAA) in 1992, Pantera del Ring was one of the CMLL workers who left the promotion to join AAA. He and Latin Lover defeated Fuerza and Juventud Guerrera on June 1, 1995, to win the Mexican National Tag Team Championship. They only held the titles for three and a half months before losing them back to the Guerrera family.

=== Promo Azteca (1997–1998) ===
By 1997, Panterita del Ring was working for the newly formed Promo Azteca promotion as a rudo ("bad guy"), winning a tournament to crown the first-ever Aztecas Middleweight Champion by defeating Ángel Azteca and Black Dragon in the finals. Even after losing the title, he remained an upper card worker for Promo Azteca until it folded in the late 1990s.

=== Return to CMLL (2000–present) ===
==== Safari and El Hombre sin Nombre (2000–2006) ====
In 2000, Panterita del Ring returned to CMLL under the ring persona Safari, a mid-level tecnicó. Safari gained momentum when he, Mr. Niebla and Olímpico defeated Blue Panther, El Signo and Fuerza Guerrera to win the Mexican National Trios Championship at Juicio Final ("Final Judgement") on March 30, 2001. Their most notable title defense occurred at the CMLL 68th Anniversary Show on September 28, defeating Gran Markus Jr., Poder Boricua and Violencia. On June 23, 2002, they lost the title to Los Nuevos Infernales (Averno, Mephisto and El Satánico). In late 2003, Safari, El Felino and Volador Jr. defeated Alan Stone, Super Crazy and Zumbido in a tournament final for the vacant title, which they lost to Pandilla Guerrera ("Gang of Warriors"; Doctor X, Nitro and Sangre Azteca) on March 25, 2005.

Later that year, Safari adopted the rudo ring persona El Hombre sin Nombre ("The Man without Name"). The name indicates the wrestler is a "blank slate" since he has no name and wrestles in plain black trunks and a mask; no public reference was given to his previous persona. CMLL started a contest for the fans to come up with a new name and persona for this wrestler. He notably paired with Héctor Garza for the Torneo Gran Alternativa ("Great Alternative Tournament"), in which a rookie is paired with a veteran. On June 2, 2006, they defeated Máximo and Negro Casas in the quarter-finals, but lost to Misterioso Jr. and Perro Aguayo Jr. in the semi-finals.

==== Ephesto (2006–2021) ====
As the contest ended in late 2006, El Hombre Sin Nombre was repackaged as Ephesto, named after the Greek God of fire Hephaestus. His new look consisted of predominantly black attire and a mask with a ram's horn design, joining Averno and Mephisto to form the stable La Triada del Terror ("The Trio of Terror"). They defeated El Hijo del Fantasma, La Máscara and Volador Jr. at the CMLL 75th Anniversary Show on September 19, 2008. He remained with Averno and Mephisto as they formed Los Hijos del Averno ("The Sons of Hell"). On December 7, Ephesto unsuccessfully challenged La Sombra for the NWA World Welterweight Championship.

In mid-2009, Ephesto entered a feud with Rey Bucanero, challenging him for the CMLL World Light Heavyweight Championship. He initially declined the challenge, but later accepted it after Ephesto purchased a ringside ticket to a show with Bucanero in the main event and interfered in the match, similar to what Bucanero had done to him the previous week. On May 26, Ephesto defeated Bucanero to win the title via referee stoppage after Bucanero suffered a knee injury. He participated in the champion-designated Universal Championship tournament, but lost to Místico in the first round on June 12. At Sin Salida ("No Escape") on December 4, Ephesto and Mephisto unsuccessfully challenged La Sombra and Volador Jr. for the CMLL World Tag Team Championship. Ephesto then participated in the 2010 Universal Championship; he was part of "Block A" that competed on the July 30 Super Viernes, co-winning the eight-man seeding battle royal, but was eliminated by El Texano Jr. in the first round of the actual tournament. Ephesto was one of fourteen men putting their mask on the line in a steel cage Lucha de Apuestas ("bet match") in the main event of the CMLL 77th Anniversary Show on September 3; he was the third man to leave the cage, retaining his mask as all three Los Hijos del Averno members quickly left the cage. On February 22, 2011, Ephesto lost his title to Rush, ending his reign at 637 days.

On July 15, Los Hijos del Averno defeated La Generación Dorada (Máscara Dorada, La Máscara and La Sombra) to win the CMLL World Trios Championship. On September 2, Ephesto lost in the first round of the 2011 Universal Championship to stablemate Mephisto. They lost the title to El Bufete del Amor (Marco Corleone, Máximo and Rush) on February 19, 2012. On March 8, 2013, Ephesto was paired with técnico Ángel de Oro for the Torneo Nacional de Parejas Increibles ("National Incredible Pairs Tournament"), where rivals are forced to work together, but lost to Diamante Azul and Euforia in the first round. On August 9, 2015, Los Hijos del Infierno defeated Los Reyes de la Atlantida ("The Kings of the Atlantis"; Atlantis, Delta and Guerrero Maya Jr.) to win the Mexican National Trios Championship, Ephesto's third trios title reign, but the first under the "Ephesto" ring character. As such, Ephesto was eligible for the 2015 Universal Championship, where he was again defeated by Mephisto on October 9. For the 2016 Universal Championship, Ephesto was eliminated in the first round by La Máscara. Later that year, Ephesto feuded with Guerrero Maya Jr. as the two fought on opposite sides in various six-man tag team matches; news outlets speculated on if the two would put their masks on the line in a Lucha de Apuestas, although nothing came of it.

Ephesto, Mephisto, and Luciferno were scheduled to challenge El Sky Team (Místico, Valiente, and Volador Jr.) for the CMLL World Trios Championship at Homenaje a Dos Leyendas ("Homage to Two Legends") on March 17, 2017. However, Ephesto was pulled out of the match after undergoing surgery the previous week when he developed sepsis; Hechicero took his place. On July 25, after eleven successful title defenses against both tecnicó trios (such as Ángel de Oro, Dragon Lee and Stuka Jr.) and rudo teams (such as Los Invasores; Olímpico, Kraneo and Ripper), Los Hijos del Infierno lost the title to Nueva Generación Dinamita (El Cuatrero, Forastero and Sansón). On February 28, 2020, Ephesto and Luciferno participated in a tournament for the revived Mexican National Tag Team Championship, defeating Black Panther and Blue Panther Jr. in the first round, before losing to Soberano Jr. and Titán in the quarter-finals. On November 27, Ephesto was the first wrestler eliminated by Diamante Azul in the torneo cibernetico as part of the Leyenda de Plata ("The Silver Legend") tournament.

==== Return of Panterita del Ring (2021–present) ====
On May 28, 2021, Ephesto revived the Panterita del Ring gimmick to team with his son, Panterita del Ring Jr., in the family-oriented Copa Dinastia ("Dynasties Cup") tournament. They were eliminated in the first round by Espíritu Negro and Rey Cometa. The following month, he was paired with Gemelo Diablo II for the Torneo Nacional de Parejas Increibles, defeating Cometa and Raziel in the first round, before losing to Blue Panther Jr. and Sansón in the quarter-finals. On September 2, 2022, he participated in a torneo cibernetico for the Copa Independencia ("Independence Cup"), but was eliminated early by eventual winner Místico. The next night, he unsuccessfully challenged El Terrible for the Mexican National Heavyweight Championship. On June 11, 2023, he and his son lost to Dr. Karonte I and Místico in the first round of the Copa Dinastia tournament. They entered the tournament again on June 16, 2024, this time with his son repackaged as the second Máscara Dorada. After defeating Valiente and Valiente Jr. in the first round, they lost to Stuka Jr. and Hijo del Stuka Jr. in the semi-finals.

=== New Japan Pro-Wrestling (2005, 2017) ===
As Safari, he debuted for New Japan Pro-Wrestling (NJPW) in December 2005 as part of the "Battle Final" tour, working alongside Sangre Azteca as a tag team. In January 2017, as Ephesto, he returned to Japan to compete in Fantastica Mania 2017, the annual tour co-produced by CMLL and NJPW.

== Personal life ==
Ephesto's brother, Jesús Parra Ramírez, worked for CMLL under the name "Lucifierno" and previously worked under ring names such as Hooligan, El Hombre Sin Nombre (years after Ephesto used the same name) and Último Rebelde. For years, there was a common misconception among lucha libre fans that Ephesto, Último Guerrero and Hooligan were all brothers. All three come from the "Lagunero" area in Mexico, and early in their professional wrestling career, the three stuck together to try to break into wrestling. This shared experience caused them to sometimes refer to each other as "Brother" even though no familiar relationship exists between Último Guerrero and the Parra brothers. Ephesto's nephew made his CMLL debut in 2014 under the name "El Rebelde".

== Championships and accomplishments ==
- Asistencia Asesoría y Administración
  - Mexican National Tag Team Championship (1 time) – with Latin Lover
- Consejo Mundial de Lucha Libre
  - CMLL World Light Heavyweight Championship (1 time)
  - CMLL World Trios Championship (1 time) – with Averno and Mephisto
  - Mexican National Trios Championship (3 times) – with Olimpico and Mr. Niebla (1), and Volador Jr. and El Felino (1), Lucifierno and Mephisto (1)
  - Copa Bobby Bonales (2022)
- Promo Azteca
  - Aztecas Middleweight Championship (1 time)
- Pro Wrestling Illustrated
  - PWI ranked him #152 of the 500 best singles wrestlers of the PWI 500 in 2007

== Luchas de Apuestas record ==
Winner (wager)	Loser (wager)	Location	Event	Date	Notes
Pantera del Ring (mask)	Acuario (hair)	Aguascalientes, Aguascalientes	Live event	N/A	
Pantera del Ring (mask)	Guerrero Negro (hair)	Aguascalientes, Aguascalientes	Live event	N/A	
Pantera del Ring (mask)	Dragon (mask)	Torreón, Coahuila	Live event	N/A	
Pantera del Ring (mask)	Astro Flash (mask)	Torreón, Coahuila	Live event	N/A	
Pantera del Ring (mask)	Megatron (mask)	Monterrey, Nuevo León	Live event	N/A	
Pantera del Ring (mask)	Principe Island (hair)	Monterrey, Nuevo León	Live event	1992	
Pantera del Ring (mask)	Kendo (hair)	Monterrey, Nuevo León	Live event	1992	
Pantera del Ring (mask)	White Wolf (mask)	Monterrey, Nuevo León	Live event	November 22, 1998	
