= CMLL World Trios Championship =

Professional wrestling trios tag team championship

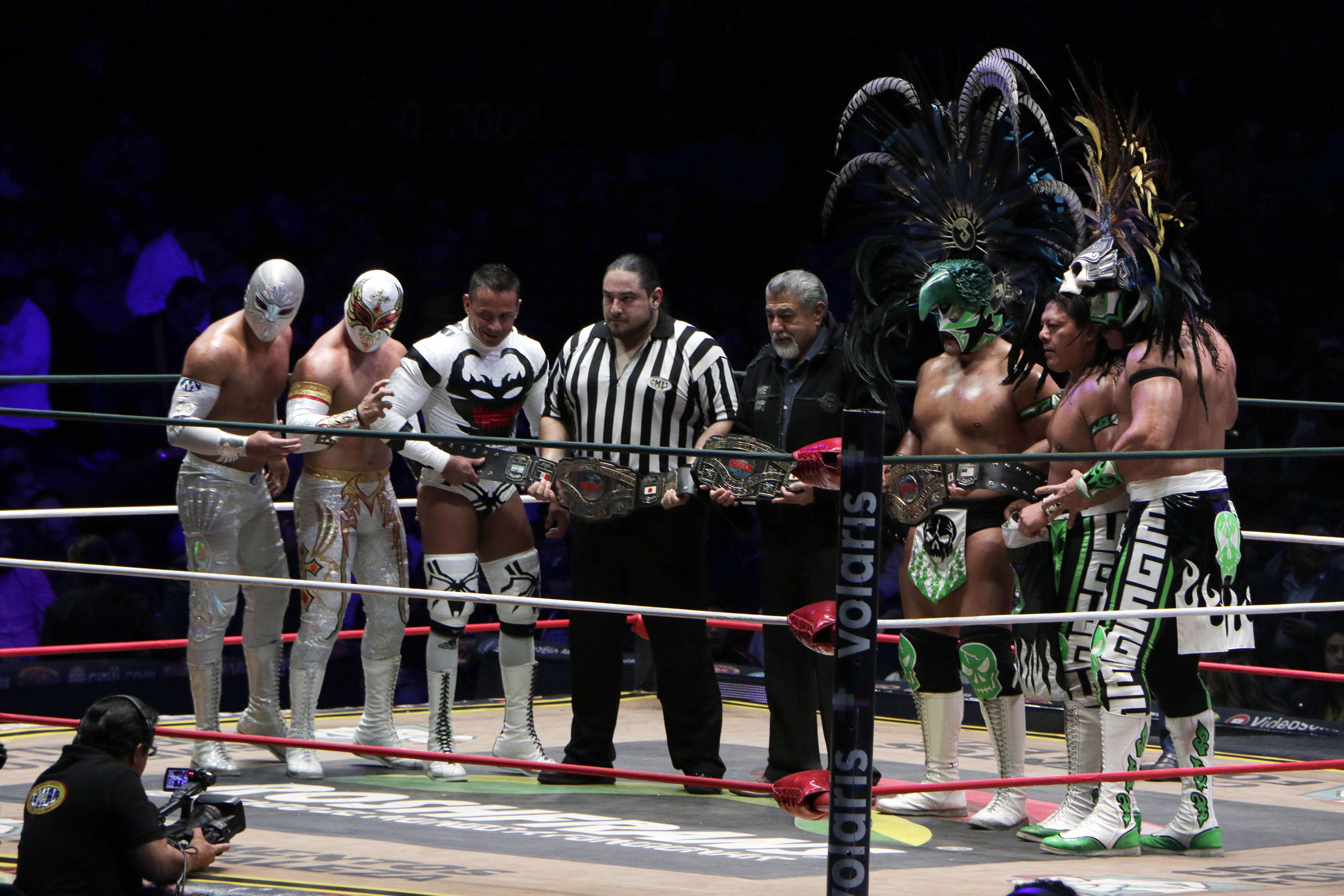
- Champions Los Guerreros Laguneros and challengers Carístico, Místico, and Volador Jr.

Details
- Promotion: Consejo Mundial de Lucha Libre
- Date established: November 22, 1991
- Current champions: El Sky Team (Máscara Dorada, Místico and Neón)
- Date won: May 16, 2025
Statistics
- First champions: Los Infernales (MS-1, Pirata Morgan and El Satánico)
- Most reigns: Team: Los Infernales (MS-1, Pirata Morgan and El Satánico) / El Hijo del Fantasma, Héctor Garza and La Máscara (2 times); Individual: Héctor Garza and Último Guerrero and Euforia 5 times as well so 3 way tie for most reigns individually (5 times)
- Longest reign: Black Warrior, Blue Panther and Dr. Wagner Jr. (1140 days)
- Shortest reign: La Ola Amarilla (Hiroshi Tanahashi, Okumura and Taichi) and The Cl4n (Ciber the Main Man, The Chris and Sharlie Rockstar) (14 days)
- Oldest champion: Canek (52 years, 20 days)
- Youngest champion: La Sombra (20 years, 199 days)
- Heaviest champion: Brazo de Plata (135 kg (298 lb))
- Lightest champion: Perro Aguayo Jr. (75 kg (165 lb))

The CMLL World Trios Championship (Spanish: "Campeonato Mundial de Trios") is a professional wrestling championship promoted by Consejo Mundial de Lucha Libre (CMLL) in Mexico. The title has existed since 1991 and is contested for by teams of three wrestlers.

The first champions were Los Infernales ("The Infernal Ones"; MS-1, Pirata Morgan and El Satánico) who won a tournament on November 22, 1991. Since then 28 trios have held the championship. The current champions are El Sky Team (Máscara Dorada, Místico and Neón). They won the titles by defeating Los Infernales (Euforia, Averno and Mephisto) at Viernes Espectacular on May 16, 2025, in Mexico City, Mexico. The championship has been vacated on four occasions, each time leading to CMLL holding a tournament to determine new champions. Only two teams have held the title on more than one occasion, Los Infernales and the trio of Héctor Garza, Hijo del Fantasma and La Máscara.

== History ==
With the emergence of trios (tag teams consisting of three people) such as Los Misioneros de la Muerte, Los Brazos and more, the six-man tag team match became increasingly popular in the early 1980s. Its popularity led to the trios format becoming the most prevalent match format in Lucha libre to this day. In 1985, the Mexican lucha libre, or professional wrestling, promotion Empresa Mexicana de Lucha Libre ("Mexican Wrestling Enterprise"; EMLL) was given control of the newly created Mexican National Trios Championship. Over the subsequent six years, that championship became the focal point of the very popular trios division, serving as the highest honor EMLL could bestow on a trio at the time. In 1991, EMLL changed their name to Consejo Mundial de Lucha Libre ("World Wrestling Council") and began to establish a series of CMLL-branded world championships, relegating the Mexican National championships to being a secondary level of championships within the company. In 1991, CMLL added a CMLL-branded world championship for the trios division. They held a 16-team tournament to crown the first champions, a tournament that saw "Los Infernales" ("The Infernal Ones"; MS-1, Pirata Morgan and El Satánico) defeat "Los Brazos" ("The Arms"; El Brazo, Brazo de Oro and Brazo de Plata) to become the first CMLL World Trios Champions. Over the next couple of years, the championship would be held by such teams as "Los Intocables" ("The Untouchables" Jaque Mate, Masakre and Pierroth Jr.) and "La Ola Blanca" ("The White Wave"; Gran Markus Jr., El Hijo del Gladiador and Dr. Wagner Jr.). In 1993, the then-reigning Mexican National Trios Champions left CMLL, and the Mexico City Boxing and wrestling commission allowed the champions to take the Mexican National Trios Championship with them. From 1993 through 2001, when the Mexican National Trios Championship returned to CMLL, the CMLL World Trios Championship was the only championship for the division.

In 1997 then-reigning champion Héctor Garza, who held the title along with Dos Caras and La Fiera, left CMLL, forcing the championship to be vacated. Subsequently, the team of Rey Bucanero, Emilio Charles Jr. and El Satánico won the championship in a tournament final over Apolo Dantés, Black Warrior, and Dr. Wagner Jr. In October 1998, the championship was vacated again when Mr. Niebla was injured, forcing his teammates Atlantis and Lizmark to give up the championship. The Lagunero team of Black Warrior, Blue Panther and Dr. Wagner Jr. defeated "Los Guapos" ("The Hansome Ones"; Bestia Salvaje, Scorpio Jr. and Zumbido) in the tournament finals, but vacated the championship in February 2002. Blue Panther and Dr. Wagner Jr. replaced Black Warrior with Fuerza Guerrera and defeated Black Warrior's new team of Mr. Niebla, Antifaz del Norte and Black Warrior himself. In 2006, the championship were vacated once again after not being defended for almost 20 months. Los Guerreros de Atlantida ("The Warriors from Atlantis"; Atlantis, Tarzan Boy and Último Guerrero) won the championship on September 29, 2006, and began defending it on a regular basis. In February 2007 Los Perros del Mal ("The Bad Dogs"; Perro Aguayo Jr., Mr. Águila and Héctor Garza) won the championship and held it for 15 months before splitting up and vacating the championship. The team of El Hijo del Fantasma, Héctor Garza and La Máscara won the tournament, defeating Blue Panther, Dos Caras Jr. and Místico in the finals. In 2015 CMLL's Guadalajara branch brought back the Occidente ("Western") Trios Championship, specifically for their shows held in Jalisco, Guadalajara. The Occidente championship is considered tertiary to both the world and national championships.

== Reigns ==
The current champions are El Sky Team (Máscara Dorada, Místico and Neón). They won the titles by defeating Los Infernales (Euforia, Averno and Mephisto) at Viernes Espectacular on May 16, 2025, in Mexico City, Mexico; they are the 38th overall championship team. Black Warrior, Blue Panther and Dr. Wagner Jr. holds the record for the longest single reign of any team, but due to the uncertainty of when the championship was vacated it can only be verified that they held them for a minimum of 1,141 days. (Note: The exact date on which the trio was forced to vacate the championship is uncertain, which means their title reign lasted between 1,141 and 1,168 days.) Dr. Wagner Jr.'s four reigns combine to 2,051 days, the highest of any wrestler. Héctor Garza's five individual reigns is the record for the most reigns of any individual wrestler. Up until late 2021, all championship matches promoted in Mexico took place under best two-out-of-three falls rules.

== Tournaments ==
=== 1991 ===
CMLL held a 16-trios team tournament from October 25, 1991 to November 22, 1991 to determine the first ever CMLL World Trios Championship team. This was the third CMLL-branded world championship created by CMLL after the CMLL World Heavyweight Championship in May and the CMLL World Light Heavyweight Championship in September 1991. In the finals, Los Infernales (El Satánico, MS-1 and Pirata Morgan) defeated Los Brazos (El Brazo, Brazo de Oro and Brazo de Plata) to win the championship.

Tournament brackets

Round of 16
Perro Aguayo, Ringo and Cachorro Mendoza	W
Emilio Charles Jr., La Fiera and Sangre Chicana
Jerry Estrada, Tony Arce and Vulcan
Octagón, El Dandy and Konnan El Barbaro	W
Los Infernales (El Satánico, MS-1 and Pirata Morgan)	W
Black Magic, Mano Negra and Vampiro Canadiense
Rayo de Jalisco Jr., Apolo Dantés and Justiciero	W
El Hijo del Gladiador, Gran Markus Jr. and Herodes
Los Brazos (El Brazo, Brazo de Oro and Brazo de Plata)	W
El Hijo del Santo, Blue Demon Jr. and El Hijo del Solitario
Los Hermanos Dinamita (Cien Caras, Máscara Año 2000 and Universo 2000)	W
Aníbal, Lizmark and Lizmark Jr.
Misterioso, Mogur and Voador
Blue Panther, Fuerza Guerrera and Pierroth Jr.	'W'
Atlantis, Ángel Azteca and Super Astro	W
Ángel Blanco Jr., El Hijo del Ángel Blanco and Medico Asesino Jr.

Quarterfinals
Perro Aguayo, Ringo and Cachorro Mendoza
Octagón, El Dandy and Konnan El Barbaro	W
Los Infernales	W
Rayo de Jalisco Jr., Apolo Dantés and Justiciero
Los Brazos	W
Los Hermanos Dinamita
Blue Panther, Fuerza Guerrera and Pierroth Jr.
Atlantis, Ángel Azteca and Super Astro	W

Semifinals
Octagón, El Dandy and Konnan El Barbaro
Los Infernales	W
Los Brazos	W
Atlantis, Ángel Azteca and Super Astro

Finals
Los Infernales	W
Los Brazos

=== 1997 ===
In early 1997 Héctor Garza, who was one-third of the reigning CMLL World Trios Champions alongside Dos Caras and La Fiera, left CMLL to join rival promotion AAA. CMLL vacated the championship and decided to hold a one-night, eight-team tournament to crown the new trios champions. The tournament took place on Friday March 21, 1997 on the undercard of the 1997 Homenaje a Salvador Lutteroth ("Homage to Salvador Lutteroth") show. In the finals, Emilio Charles Jr., Rey Bucanero and El Satánico defeated Apolo Dantés, Black Warrior, and Dr. Wagner Jr.

Tournament brackets

Quarter finals
Foreign Exchange, Miguel Perez Jr. and Steel	W
Shocker and Los Brazos (Brazo de Oro and Brazo de Plata)
Apolo Dantés, Black Warrior and Dr. Wagner Jr.	W
El Dandy, Mr. Niebla and Negro Casas
Atlantis, Lizmark and Rayo de Jalisco Jr.	W
Bestia Salvaje, El Hijo Del Santo and Scorpio Jr.
Emilio Charles Jr., Rey Bucanero and El Satánico	W
Shinobi, Tsubasa and Ultramán Jr.

Semi finals
Foreign Exchange, Miguel Perez Jr. and Steel
Apolo Dantés, Black Warrior and Dr. Wagner Jr.	W
Atlantis, Lizmark and Rayo de Jalisco Jr.
Emilio Charles Jr., Rey Bucanero and El Satánico	W

Final
Apolo Dantés, Black Warrior and Dr. Wagner Jr.
Emilio Charles Jr., Rey Bucanero and El Satánico	W

=== 1998 ===
In October 1998, Mr. Niebla suffered an injury, which forced CMLL to vacate the CMLL World Trios Championship as it was not clear when Mr. Niebla would be able to wrestle again. They held a three-show, eight-team tournament from December 4 to December 12, 1998. Former champions Atlantis and Lizmark teamed up with Emilio Charles Jr. for the tournament, while Mr. Niebla actually returned to action in time to be in the tournament as well, teaming up with Rayo de Jalisco Jr. and Shocker. In the finals the trio of Dr. Wagner Jr., Blue Panther and Black Warrior defeated Los Guapos (Scorpio Jr., Bestia Salvaje and Zumbido) to lay claim to the championship.

Tournament brackets

Quarterfinals
Gran Markus Jr., Fuerza Guerrera and Apolo Dantés
El Dandy, Vampiro and Héctor Garza	W
Los Guapos (Scorpio Jr., Bestia Salvaje and Zumbido)	W
Rayo de Jalisco Jr., Mr. Niebla and Shocker
Dr. Wagner Jr., Blue Panther and Black Warrior	W
Atlantis, Lizmark and Emilio Charles Jr.
El Felino, Negro Casas and El Hijo del Santo	W
Silver King and Los Villanos (Villano III and Villano V)

Semifinals
El Dandy, Vampiro and Héctor Garza
Los Guapos	W
Dr. Wagner Jr., Blue Panther and Black Warrior	W
El Felino, Negro Casas and El Hijo del Santo

Finals
Los Guapos
Dr. Wagner Jr., Blue Panther and Black Warrior	W

=== 2008 ===
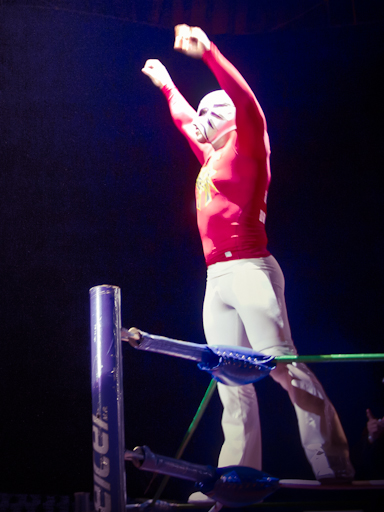
La Máscara, one-third of the tournament winners.

In the summer of 2008 then-CMLL World Trios Champions Los Perros del Mal kicked Héctor Garza out of the group; at the time Garza held the championship alongside Perros members Perro Aguayo Jr. and Mr. Águila, forcing the championship to be vacated. CMLL held an eight-team tournament for the vacant championship, starting on May 30, with the finals on June 13, 2008, during CMLL's 2008 Infierno en el Ring event.

Tournament brackets

Quarterfinals
Jauria del Terror (Averno, Mephisto and Ephesto)	W
El Sagrado, La Sombra and Volador Jr.
Blue Panther, Dos Caras Jr. and Místico	W
Los Villanos (Villano III, Villano IV and Villano V)
Los Guerreros de la Atlantida (Atlantis, Rey Bucanero and Último Guerrero)	W
El Felino, L.A. Park and Máximo
Olímpico and Los Hermanos Dinamita (Máscara Año 2000 and Universo 2000)
Los Ángeles (Héctor Garza, El Hijo del Fantasma and La Mascara)	W

Semifinals
Jauria del Terror
Blue Panther, Dos Caras Jr. and Místico	W
Los Guerreros de la Atlantida
Los Ángeles	W

Finals
Blue Panther, Dos Caras Jr. and Místico
Los Ángeles	W

=== 2013 ===
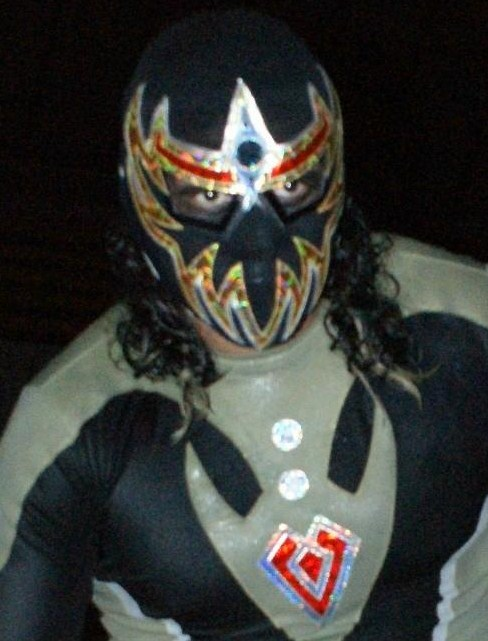
Máscara Dorada who teamed up with Místico, Valiente to win the tournament.

In May 2013 long-time CMLL World Trios Champions El Bufete del Amor (Marco Corleone, Máximo and Rush) were forced to vacate the championship due to Corleone suffering a serious knee injury. CMLL held an eight-team, two-night tournament to determine the next champions. The tournament started on June 9, 2013 and the finals took place on June 16.

Tournament brackets

Quarterfinals
Los Estetas del Aire (Máscara Dorada, Místico, Valiente)	W
Los Invasores (Mr. Águila, Psicosis and Volador Jr.)
La Fuerza TRT (El Terrible, Rey Bucanero and Tiger)	W
La Mascara, La Sombra and Rey Cometa
Blue Panther, Diamante Azul and Stuka Jr.
Los Revolucionarios del Terror (Dragón Rojo Jr., Pólvora and Rey Escorpión)	W
Los Guerreros del Infierno (Euforia, Niebla Roja and Último Guerrero)	W
Los Reyes de la Atlantida (Atlantis, Delta and Guerrero Maya Jr.)

Semifinals
Los Estetas del Aire	W
La Fuerza TRT
Los Revolucionarios del Terror
Los Guerreros del Infierno	W

Finals
Los Estetas del Aire	W
Los Guerreros del Infierno
