= Stephanie Vaquer =

Chilean professional wrestler (born 1993)

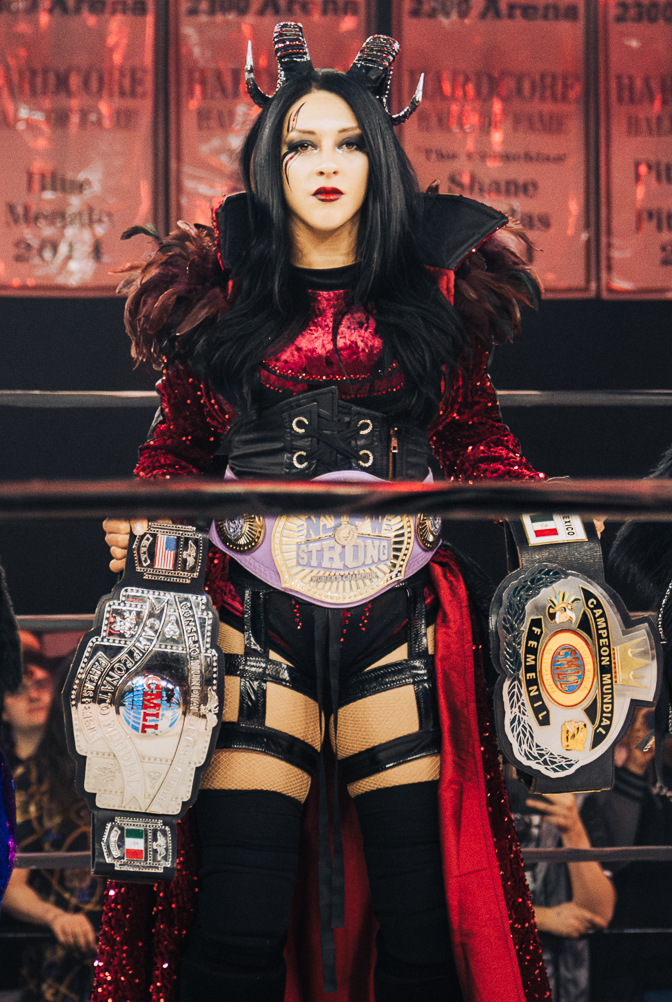
- Vaquer in 2024

Personal information
- Born: Ana Stephanie Vaquer González; 29 March 1993 (age 33) San Fernando, Chile

Professional wrestling career
- Ring name(s): Dark Angel; Stephanie Vaquer
- Billed height: 5 ft 4 in (1.63 m)
- Billed weight: 110 lb (50 kg)
- Billed from: San Fernando, Chile
- Trained by: Gran Apache; Ricky Marvin; Villano IV; Paul Slandering
- Debut: 2009

Ana Stephanie Vaquer González (born 29 March 1993) is a Chilean professional wrestler. She is signed to WWE, where she performs on the Raw brand. As of September 2026, she is a former two-time Women's World Champion. She is also a one-time NXT Women's Champion, and a one-time NXT Women's North American Champion, the only woman to hold both titles simultaneously and successfully defend both titles on the same night. Additionally she is the 2025 WWE Women's Crown Jewel Champion.

Vaquer became known for her time with the Mexican promotion Consejo Mundial de Lucha Libre (CMLL), where she is a former CMLL World Women's Champion and CMLL World Women's Tag Team Champion with Zeuxis; she was the first luchadora in CMLL history to have held both titles simultaneously and did so until her departure from CMLL in July 2024. She has also wrestled for American promotion All Elite Wrestling (AEW) and British promotion Revolution Pro Wrestling (RPW) due to the two organizations' partnerships with CMLL. She is additionally known for her stints in major Japanese promotions such as World Wonder Ring Stardom, Ice Ribbon, Tokyo Joshi Pro-Wrestling, and New Japan Pro-Wrestling (NJPW), where in the latter she is a former NJPW Strong Women's Champion.

== Early life ==
Ana Stephanie Vaquer González was born on 29 March 1993 in San Fernando, Chile, the daughter of Gladys González Soto and Héctor Vaquer Alvera. She attended Escuela Villa Centinela until fourth grade in 2004, when she moved to San Antonio with her parents. She completed her primary education there at Escuela Movilizadores Portuarios in 2006, and graduated from Instituto Comercial Marítimo Pacífico Sur in 2010.

== Professional wrestling career ==
=== Early career (2009–2019) ===
After training under Paul Slandering, Vaquer made her professional wrestling debut in 2009. Her earliest documented matches occurred in August 2010 at Máximo Combate de Lucha (MCL) events in Chile. She wrestled and served as a valet under the ring name Dark Angel, which she later dropped out of respect for Sarah Stock, the previous user of the name. At the age of 19, Vaquer moved to Veracruz, Mexico, where she received further training under Ricky Marvin, Último Guerrero, Gran Apache and Villano IV. She appeared for Revolucion Lucha Libre (RLL) on 2 September 2012, unsuccessfully challenging Prima Zomer for the RLL National Women's Championship. She made her in-ring debut in Mexico at a Chilanga Mask card on 22 December 2013, where she was defeated by Baby Judas. On 26 October 2014, she unsuccessfully challenged Sadika for the Lucha Libre Femenil (LLF) Junior Championship in Mérida. During a tour there, Vaquer suffered a triple nose fracture that forced her to stop wrestling for nearly two years, working as a waitress at a restaurant to make ends meet.

On 16 February 2019, alongside Ricky Marvin, she faced José Caporal and Mary Caporal in a mixed tag team match to win the Arena Cuautitlán Izcalli Mixed Tag Team Championship. Both successfully defended the titles on 3 August in a match against Baronessa and Psycho Kid, before vacating them due to Vaquer's signee to the Consejo Mundial de Lucha Libre (CMLL).

=== Japan (2018, 2022) ===
From July to August 2018, Vaquer made her first tour of Japan to wrestle for World Wonder Ring Stardom. She returned to Japan for Ice Ribbon at Summer Jumbo Ribbon on July 31, 2022, teaming with Dalys to defeat Hikari Shimizu and Kaho Matsushita. Over the following months, she also made appearances for Pro Wrestling Wave, Sendai Girls' Pro Wrestling, and Tokyo Joshi Pro-Wrestling (TJPW).

=== Consejo Mundial de Lucha Libre (2019–2024) ===
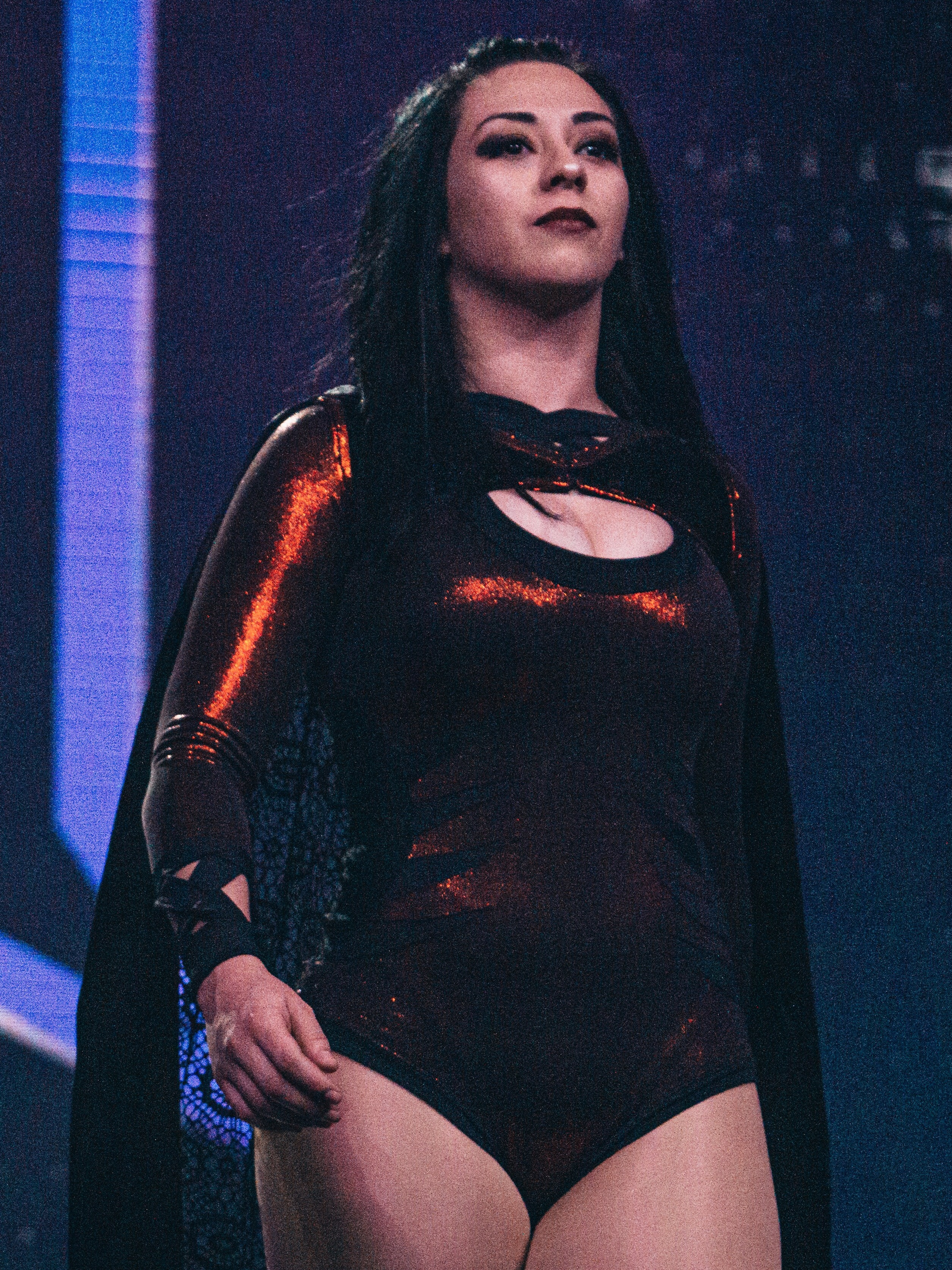
Vaquer in 2019

On 9 August 2019, Vaquer made her debut for Consejo Mundial de Lucha Libre (CMLL) in Mexico as part of the Campeonato Universal de Amazonas ("Universal Amazons Championship") tournament, becoming CMLL's first female South American wrestler. She was the second wrestler eliminated by La Jarochita. In October 2020, she was paired with Dalys in a tournament for the Mexican National Women's Tag Team Championship, defeating Estrellita and Mystique in the first round, before losing in the quarter-finals to Princesa Sugehit and Sanely. On 2 July 2021, she unsuccessfully challenged Sugehit for the CMLL World Women's Championship. On 28 October 2022, Vaquer represented Mexico in a torneo cibernetico as part of the International Gran Prix tournament, where she eliminated Reyna Isis before being eliminated by Faby.

Vaquer formed a tag team with the returning Zeuxis on 10 February 2023, defeating Marcela and Sugehit. She participated in the Copa Irma Gonzáles at Homenaje a Dos Leyendas ("Homage to Two Legends") on 17 March, but was eliminated by Isis. Four days later, she and Zeuxis defeated Las Chicas Indomables ("The Untamed Girls"; La Jarochita and Lluvia) in a tournament final to become the first Occidente Women's Tag Team Champions, marking Vaquer's first title in CMLL. At the CMLL 90th Anniversary Show on 16 September, they again defeated Las Chicas Indomables in another tournament final to become the inaugural CMLL World Women's Tag Team Champions.

At Noche de Campeones ("Night of Champions") on 29 September, Vaquer defeated La Catalina to win the vacant CMLL World Women's Championship. She made her first successful title defense against Lluvia on 14 November. On 1 December, she retained the title against Tessa Blanchard, who attacked Vaquer after the match, starting a feud between the two. At Sin Salida ("No Escape") on 1 January 2024, Vaquer, Zeuxis and Marcela lost to Blanchard, Isis and Andrómeda. On 16 February, she and Zeuxis successfully defended the CMLL World Women's Tag Team Championship against Blanchard and Lady Frost. At Homenaje a Dos Leyendas on 29 March, they teamed with Lluvia in a loss to Blanchard, La Catalina and Willow Nightingale, who pinned Vaquer. She wrestled her final match in CMLL on 9 July, defeating Blanchard; the two hugged after the match to end their feud. The next day, it was revealed that Vaquer was leaving CMLL due to personal reasons, with both the CMLL World Women's Championship and CMLL World Women's Tag Team Championship being vacated in the process.

=== New Japan Pro-Wrestling / World Wonder Ring Stardom (2023–2024) ===
On 28 April 2023, New Japan Pro-Wrestling (NJPW) announced that Vaquer would represent CMLL in a four-woman single-elimination tournament on 21 May at Resurgence to crown the inaugural Strong Women's Champion, where she lost to Mercedes Moné in the semi-finals. She challenged Mayu Iwatani for the IWGP Women's Championship at Lonestar Shootout on 10 November, but was unsuccessful.

On 10 March 2024, Vaquer wrestled on night 2 of the 2024 Cinderella Tournament hosted by NJPW's sister promotion, World Wonder Ring Stardom, defeating Giulia to capture the Strong Women's Championship, becoming a triple champion between CMLL and NJPW. After successfully defending the title against AZM on 12 April at Windy City Riot and Alex Windsor on 11 May at Resurgence, Vaquer lost the Strong Women's Championship to Moné on 30 June at Forbidden Door, ending her reign at 112 days.

=== Revolution Pro Wrestling (2024) ===
On 19 May 2024, Vaquer debuted for Revolution Pro Wrestling (RevPro) on Fantastica Mania: UK show 1, defeating Kanji. On the second Fantastica Mania: UK show, Vaquer successfully defended her Strong Women's Championship against Rhio. She was scheduled to wrestle Dani Luna for the Undisputed British Women's Championship during an August RevPro event, but the match was cancelled after Vaquer signed with WWE.

=== All Elite Wrestling (2024) ===
On the 29 May 2024 episode of Dynamite, Vaquer made her All Elite Wrestling (AEW) debut, confronting AEW TBS Champion Mercedes Moné. Vaquer made her AEW in-ring debut on the 29 June show of Collision, defeating Lady Frost. On 30 June, at Forbidden Door, Vaquer failed to win the TBS Championship from Moné in a Winner Takes All match and also lost her Strong Women's Championship in the process.

=== WWE (2024–present) ===
==== NXT (2024–2025) ====
Prior to signing with the company, Vaquer participated in a WWE tryout in December 2018, which was being held in her home country of Chile. On 10 July 2024, WWE Senior Vice President of Talent Development Creative Shawn Michaels announced that Vaquer had officially signed with the company and was assigned to the NXT brand, making her the second Chilean woman, and the third Chilean overall to sign with WWE. She made her WWE in-ring debut at a live event in Mexico City on 13 July, defeating WWE Women's Tag Team Champion Isla Dawn. Vaquer made her on-screen debut appearance via satellite on the 24 September episode of NXT during the in-ring press conference between NXT Women's Champion Roxanne Perez and Giulia. She made her televised in-ring debut on the 15 October episode of NXT, defeating Wren Sinclair. After the match, she was attacked by Perez and Cora Jade until Giulia came to make the save, leading to a tag team match at NXT Halloween Havoc on 27 October, which they won after Vaquer pinned Perez. Vaquer competed in the women's Iron Survivor Challenge at NXT Deadline on 7 December, which was won by Giulia.

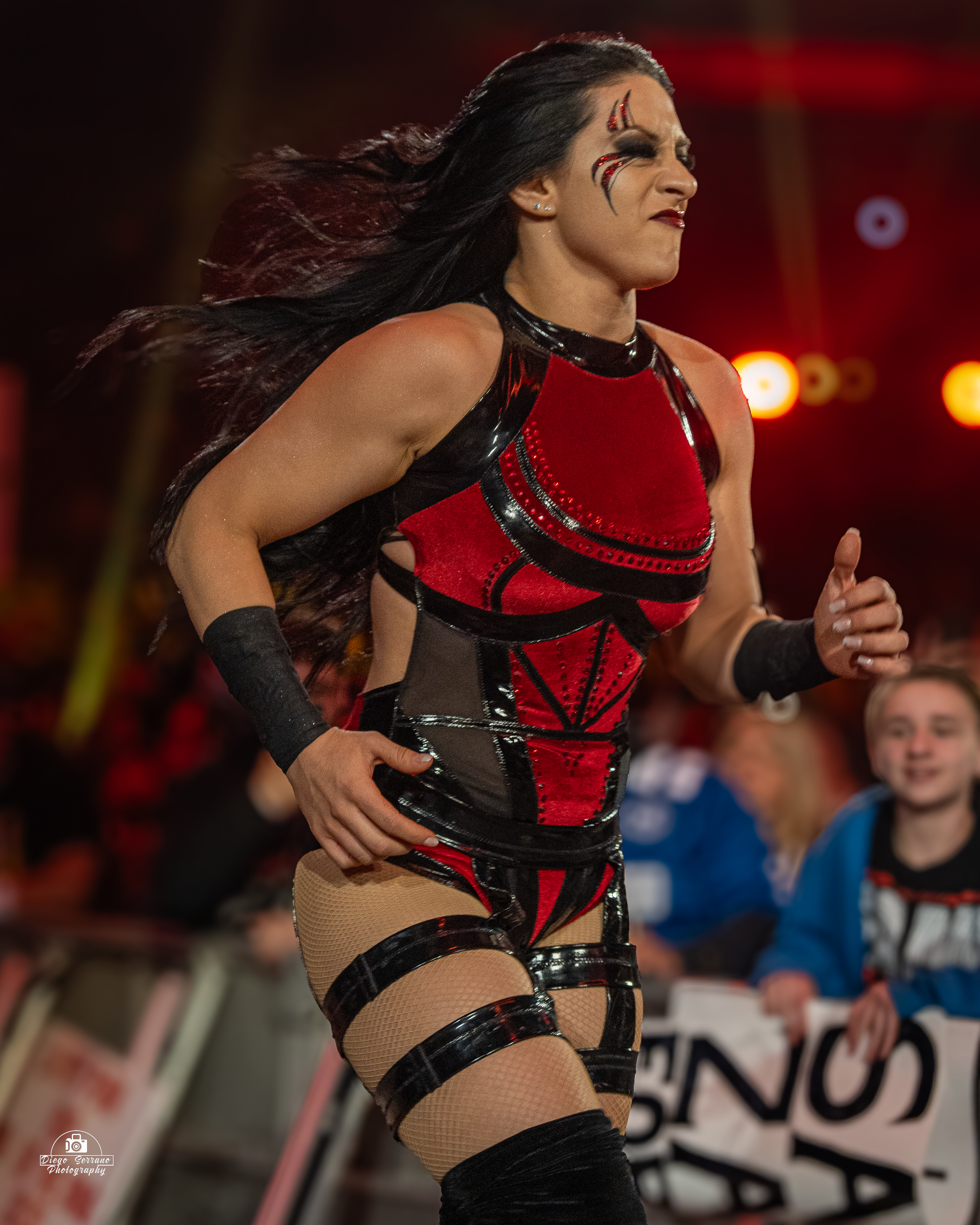
Vaquer making her entrance at the 2025 Royal Rumble.

On 1 February 2025, at Royal Rumble, Vaquer entered her first women's Royal Rumble match at number 24, but was eliminated by Nia Jax. At NXT Vengeance Day on 15 February, Vaquer defeated Fallon Henley to win the NXT Women's North American Championship, marking her first WWE championship win and becoming the first Chilean and South American woman to win a championship in WWE. Vaquer made her first successful title defense on the February 25 episode of NXT against Karmen Petrovic. After the match, she was confronted by NXT Women's Champion Giulia, who claimed that she was the greatest champion in NXT, to which Vaquer declared that it must be decided in a Winner Takes All match, which was made official for NXT: Roadblock.

At the event on 11 March, Vaquer defeated Giulia to win the NXT Women's Championship, becoming the first women’s double champion in NXT history. On the 25 March episode of NXT, Vaquer defeated Jaida Parker to retain the NXT Women's Championship in her first defence and Henley in a rematch in the main event to retain the NXT Women's North American Championship, becoming the first double champion in WWE history to successfully defend both titles on the same night. On 1 April, Vaquer relinquished the NXT Women's North American Championship, ending her reign at 45 days. At Stand and Deliver on 19 April, Vaquer defeated Giulia, Parker and Jordynne Grace in a fatal four-way match to retain the NXT Women's Championship. She made another successful title defence on the 22 April episode of NXT against Perez. At Battleground on 25 May, Vaquer successfully defended the NXT Women's Championship against Grace. Two nights later on NXT, Vaquer lost the title to Jacy Jayne after interference from Jayne's Fatal Influence stablemates Henley and Jazmyn Nyx, ending her reign at 77 days in what would be her final match as part of the NXT roster.

On 16 September, Vaquer made a special appearance at NXT Homecoming, where she teamed with Rhea Ripley and Lyra Valkyria to defeat Fatal Influence in the main event.

==== Raw and Women's World Champion (2025–present) ====
Vaquer made her first main roster appearance on the Raw after WrestleMania 41, facing Women's World Champion Iyo Sky in a match that ended in a no contest after interference from Giulia and Roxanne Perez. On 30 May 2025, Raw general manager Adam Pearce announced that Vaquer had joined the brand. On the 2 June episode of Raw, Vaquer defeated Ivy Nile and Liv Morgan in a triple threat match to qualify for the Money in the Bank ladder match. At the WWE and Lucha Libre Asistencia Asesoría y Administración (AAA) event Worlds Collide on 7 June, Vaquer and Lola Vice defeated Chik Tormenta and Dalys, the latter of whom Vaquer started a mini feud with in NXT. Hours later at Money in the Bank, she failed to win the namesake ladder match.

At Evolution on 13 July, Vaquer won the 20-woman battle royal for a Women's World Championship match at Clash in Paris, though the match was ultimately cancelled due to the Women's World Championship being vacated. At Wrestlepalooza on 20 September, Vaquer defeated Sky to win the vacant title, becoming the first Chilean and South American woman to win a world championship in the WWE. At Crown Jewel on 11 October, Vaquer defeated WWE Women's Champion Tiffany Stratton to win the WWE Women's Crown Jewel Championship. She successfully defended the Women's World Championship against Nikki Bella at Survivor Series: WarGames on 29 November, and in a triple threat match also involving Raquel Rodriguez on the 29 December episode of Raw. On the 2 February 2026 episode of Raw, Vaquer defeated Rodriguez to retain the title in a Philadelphia Street Fight to end their feud. At Night 1 of WrestleMania 42 on 18 April, Vaquer lost the title to Royal Rumble winner Liv Morgan after interference from her Judgment Day stablemates, Rodriguez and Perez, ending her first reign at 210 days and marking her first pinfall loss on the main roster. On the 27 April episode of Raw, Vaquer was attacked by The Judgment Day (Morgan, Rodriguez, and Perez) backstage and reportedly suffered a second-degree AC joint sprain in her shoulder. Vaquer later revealed on the third season of WWE Unreal released in July 2026 that she was written off television to take an extended leave.

After a three-month hiatus, Vaquer returned on the 3 August episode of Raw to seek revenge, where she attacked Morgan, Rodriguez, and Perez before having a stare down with Becky Lynch. On the 7 September episode of Raw, she failed to regain the title from Morgan after interference from Perez and Rodriguez. However, Vaquer defeated Morgan to regain the title at a live event in Santiago on 12 September after an assist from special guest referee Lynch, marking the first time a world championship in WWE has changed hands in South America. At Money in the Bank on 10 October, Vaquer lost the title back to Morgan in a triple threat match also involving Lynch, ending her second reign at 28 days. In the following month, Vaquer teamed with Charlotte Flair, Alexa Bliss, Tatum Paxley, and Bayley to face Fatal Influence (Jacy Jayne, Fallon Henley, and Lainey Reid), Jade Cargill, and Michin in a WarGames match at Survivor Series: WarGames on 28 November. This will be Vaquer's WarGames match debut.

== Other media ==
Vaquer made her video game debut as a playable character in WWE 2K25 as a DLC. She has since appeared in WWE 2K26.

== Personal life ==
Vaquer has stated that she lived in Mexico for a total of eleven years (as of 2025).

While she was living in Japan, she also learned the art of kintsugi, which is incorporated on her makeup near her right eye, where she suffered the fractures back in Mexico.

On 4 March 2023, Vaquer filed a criminal complaint against fellow wrestler Rogelio Reyes, whom she had started dating when they both worked for CMLL. According to the complaint, he choked her and threw her against a wall. On 9 March, CMLL released a statement stating that they "energetically condemn any form of violence against women and reiterate our commitment to promote a life free of violence and harassment in our staff and attendees to our arenas". On 10 March, after a show for AAA in Aguascalientes, Reyes was arrested on a warrant in Mexico City and charged with attempted murder and domestic violence.

In 2025, Vaquer began dating NXT wrestler Myles Borne.

== Championships and accomplishments ==
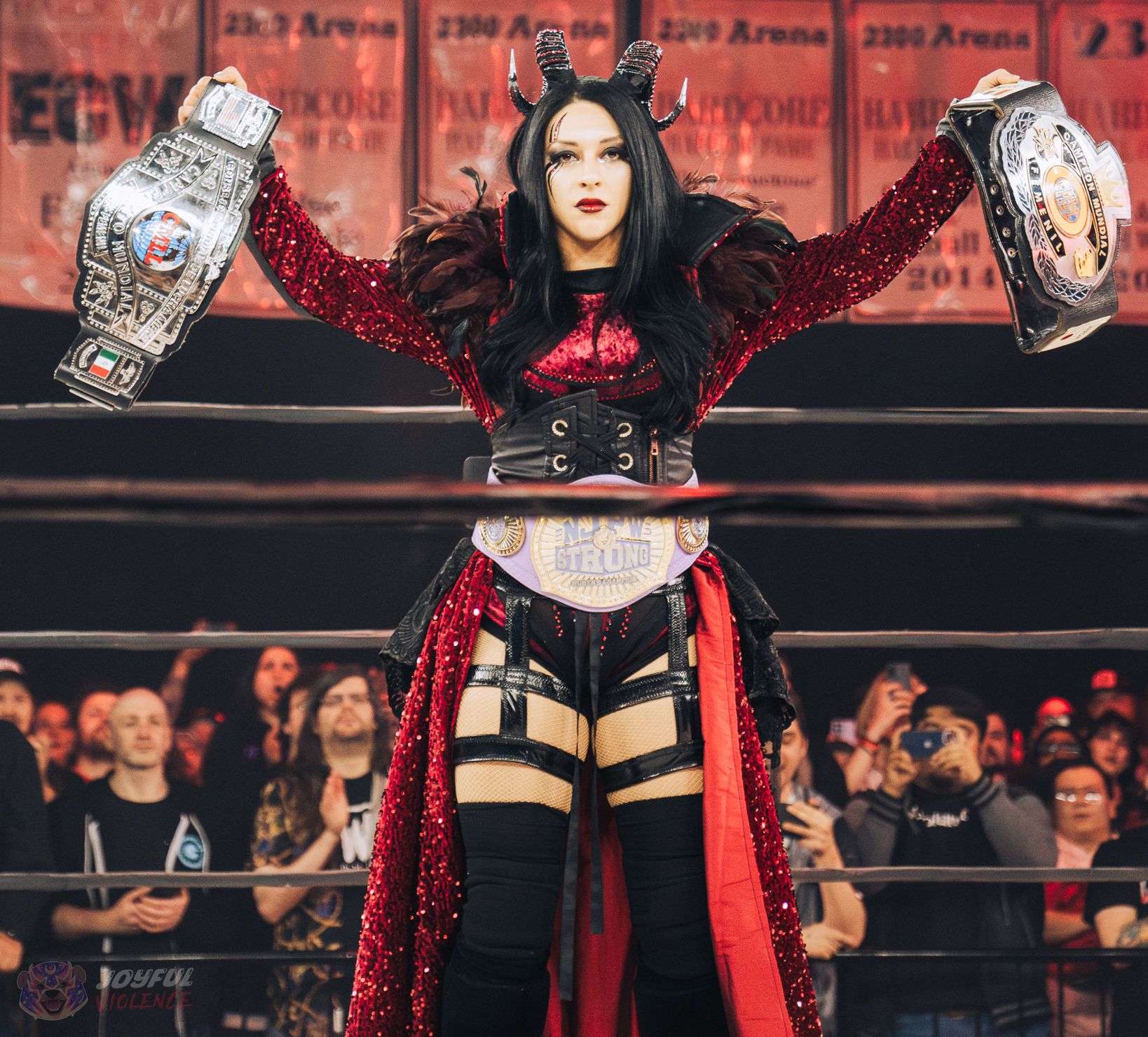
Vaquer is a former CMLL World Women's Champion (left hand), CMLL World Women's Tag Team Champion (right hand), and NJPW Strong Women's Champion (around waist).

- Arena Azteca Budokan
  - Arena Azteca Budokan International Women's Championship (1 time)
- Alianza Universal de Lucha Libre
  - AULL Women's Championship (1 time)
- Arena Cuautitlán Izcalli
  - Arena Cuautitlán Izcalli Mixed Tag Team Championship (1 time) – with Ricky Marvin
- Consejo Mundial de Lucha Libre
  - CMLL World Women's Championship (1 time)
  - CMLL World Women's Tag Team Championship (1 time, inaugural) – with Zeuxis
  - Occidente Women's Tag Team Championship (1 time, inaugural) – with Zeuxis
  - Occidente Women's Tag Team Championship Tournament (2023) – with Zeuxis
- ESPN
  - Female Wrestler of the Year (2025)
  - Best Debut Wrestler (2025)
- Guerreros de la Lucha Libre
  - GDLL Women's Championship (1 time)
- IWC Legacy
  - IWC Women's Championship (1 time)
- New Japan Pro-Wrestling
  - Strong Women's Championship (1 time)
- Premios Rasslin
  - Chilean Wrestler in Foreign Parts of the Year (2023, 2024)
- Pro Wrestling Illustrated
  - Ranked No. 1 of the top 250 female singles wrestlers in PWI Women's 250 in 2026
  - Ranked No. 84 of the top 100 tag teams in the 2023 PWI Tag Team 100 - with Zeuxis
- WWE
  - Women's World Championship (2 times)
  - WWE Women's Crown Jewel Championship (2025)
  - NXT Women's Championship (1 time)
  - NXT Women's North American Championship (1 time)
  - Evolution Battle Royal (2025)
  - Slammy Award (1 time)
    - Breakout Superstar of the Year (2025)
