= Occidente Women's Tag Team Championship =

Professional wrestling tag team championship

Details
- Promotion: Consejo Mundial de Lucha Libre
- Date established: March 21, 2023
- Current champions: Las Infernales (Dark Silueta and Zeuxis)
- Date won: January 7, 2026
Statistics
- First champions: Stephanie Vaquer and Zeuxis
- Most reigns: Zeuxis (2)
- Oldest champion: Zeuxis (34 years, 138 days)
- Youngest champion: Stephanie Vaquer (29 years, 357 days)
- Heaviest champion: Zeuxis (148 pounds (67 kg))
- Lightest champion: Stephanie Vaquer (110 pounds (50 kg))

The Occidente Women's Tag Team Championship (Campeonato Femeniles de Parejas de Occidente in Spanish) is a women's professional wrestling tag team championship owned by the Mexican lucha libre promotion Consejo Mundial de Lucha Libre (CMLL). The championship was first introduced on March 21, 2023, where Stephanie Vaquer and Zeuxis won a one-night tournament to be crowned the inaugural champions. The current champions are Las Infernales (Dark Silueta and Zeuxis), who are in their first reign as a team but second for Silueta and first for Zeuxis individually. They won the vacant title by defeating Las Chicas Indomables (Lluvia and La Jarochita) on Martes de Glamour in Guadalajara, Jalisco, on January 7, 2025. Previous champions Adira and Naútica vacated the title after Adira left CMLL.

== Title history ==
On March 21, 2023, at the CMLL held a one-night eight-teams tournament to determine the first Occidente Women's Tag Team Champions. Stephanie Vaquer and Zeuxis reached to the finals, where they defeated the Mexican National Women's Tag Team Champions Las Chicas Indomables (La Jarochita and Lluvia) to be the first title holders in the championship's history.

=== Inaugural tournament ===
Quarterfinals; Martes de Glamour (March 21)
Marcela and Metalica
Princesa Sugehit and Reyna Isis
Las Chicas Indomables (La Jarochita and Lluvia)
Quimera and Valkiria
La Amapola and Tiffany
La Catalina and La Maligna
Hera and Olympia
Stephanie Vaquer and Zeuxis

Semifinals; Martes de Glamour
Isis and Sugehit
Las Chicas Indomables
Catalina and Maligna
Vaquer and Zeuxis

Finals; Martes de Glamour
Las Chicas Indomables
Vaquer and Zeuxis

== Reigns ==
As of November 10, 2026, there has been four reigns shared between seven different champions. Stephanie Vaquer and Zeuxis were the inaugural champions. Zeuxis holds the most reigns at 2 and is also the oldest champion at 34 years while Stephanie Vaquer is the youngest at 29 years. Las Infernales (Dark Silueta and Zeuxis) are the current champions, in their first reign as a team but second for Silueta and first for Zeuxis individually. They won the vacant title by defeating Las Chicas Indomables (Lluvia and La Jarochita) on Martes de Glamour in Guadalajara, Jalisco, on January 7, 2025. Previous champions Adira and Naútica vacated the title after Adira left CMLL.

Key
No.	Overall reign number
Reign	Reign number for the specific team—reign numbers for the individuals are in parentheses, if different
Days	Number of days held
+	Current reign is changing daily

No.	Champion	Championship change			Reign statistics		Notes	Ref.
No.	Champion	Date	Event	Location	Reign	Days	Notes	Ref.
Consejo Mundial de Lucha Libre (CMLL)
1	Stephanie Vaquer and Zeuxis	March 21, 2023	Martes de Glamour	Guadalajara, Jalisco, Mexico	1	179	Defeated Las Chicas Indomables (La Jarochita and Lluvia) in the finals of an eight-team tournament to become the inaugural champions.	
—	Vacated	September 16, 2023	—	—	—	—	Championship was vacated when Vaquer and Zeuxis won the CMLL World Women's Tag Team Championship	
2	Hatanna and Katana/Tabata	January 23, 2024	Martes de Glamour	Guadalajara, Jalisco, Mexico	1	91	Defeated Adira and Pantera to win the vacant championship. On January 31, 2024, Katana voluntarily unmasked and changed her ring name to Tabata.	
3	Adira and Náutica	April 23, 2024	Martes de Glamour	Guadalajara, Jalisco, Mexico	1	235		
—	Vacated	December 14, 2024	—	Guadalajara, Jalisco, Mexico	—	—	The title was vacated when Adira left CMLL.	
4	Las Infernales (Dark Silueta and Zeuxis)	January 7, 2025	Martes de Glamour	Guadalajara, Jalisco, Mexico	1	672+	Defeated Lluvia and La Jarochita to win the vacant title.	

== Combined reigns ==
As of November 10, 2026.

†	Indicates the current champion

=== By team ===
Rank	Team	No. of reigns	Combined days
1	Las Infernales (Dark Silueta and Zeuxis) †	1	672+
2	Stephanie Vaquer and Zeuxis	1	179
3	Hatanna and Tabata	1	91
4	Adira and Náutica	1	235

=== By wrestler ===
Rank	Wrestler	No. of reigns	Combined days
1	Zeuxis †	2	851+
2	Lluvia †	1	672+
3	Adira	1	235
3	Náutica	1	235
5	Stephanie Vaquer	1	179
6	Hatanna	1	91
6	Katana/Tabata	1	91
