= CMLL 92nd Anniversary Show =

Mexican professional wrestling show

- Promotion: Consejo Mundial de Lucha Libre
- Date: September 19, 2025
- City: Mexico City, Mexico
- Venue: Arena México
- Attendance: ~16,000

Consejo Mundial de Lucha Libre Anniversary Shows chronology
← Previous; CMLL 91st Anniversary Show	Next → CMLL 93rd Anniversary Show

The CMLL 92nd Anniversary Show (Spanish: 92. Aniversario de CMLL) was the 92nd annual (and 103rd overall) CMLL Anniversary Show professional wrestling pay-per-view and livestreaming event produced by Consejo Mundial de Lucha Libre (CMLL). It was held on September 19, 2025, at Arena México in Mexico City, Mexico. It was the first CMLL event to be livestreamed on TrillerTV and the first to be streamed with English commentary.

In the main event, Esfinge defeated Valiente in a Lucha de Apuestas Mask vs. Mask match. In other prominent matches, Místico defeated All Elite Wrestling's MJF in a Lucha de Apuestas Title vs. Mask match to win MJF's CMLL World Light Heavyweight Championship and successfully defend his mask, and Rey Bucanero vs. El Felino in a Lucha de Apuestas Hair vs. Hair match ended in a double disqualification – since the match ended in a double disqualification, both men got their heads shaved.

== Production ==
Other on-screen personnel
Role:	Name:
English commentators	Veda Scott
English commentators	Samuray del Sol
English commentators	Miguel Castro

=== Background ===
The Consejo Mundial de Lucha Libre Anniversary Show, formerly known as the Empresa Mexicana de Lucha Libre Anniversary Show, is the biggest annual event promoted by Mexican lucha libre promotion Consejo Mundial de Lucha Libre (CMLL), typically held in September every year, commemorating the creation of CMLL, then known as Empresa Mexicana de Lucha Libre (EMLL), in 1933 by Salvador Lutteroth. The first event promoted under the Anniversary Show banner was held in 1934 and since then over 100 additional Anniversary Shows have been held, making it the longest-running annual professional wrestling event in history.

The event was available to livestream on TrillerTV and YouTube with both Spanish and English commentary.

=== Storylines ===
The event featured seven professional wrestling matches that involved different wrestlers from pre-existing scripted feuds and storylines. Wrestlers portrayed heroes (tecnicos), villains (rudos), or less distinguishable characters in scripted events that built tension and culminated in a wrestling match or series of matches. Storylines were produced on CMLL's weekly Friday night show Super Viernes and on other CMLL events.

== Results ==
No.	Results	Stipulations	Times
1	Las Chicas Indomables (Lluvia and La Jarochita) (c) defeated Persephone and Reyna Isis by pinfall	Tag team match for the CMLL World Women's Tag Team Championship	11:28
2	Los Hermanos Chavez (Ángel de Oro and Niebla Roja) (c) defeated La Escuadra (El Hijo del Villano III and Villano III Jr.) by submission	Tag team match for the CMLL World Tag Team Championship	13:51
3	Atlantis Jr. and El Sky Team (Máscara Dorada and Neón) defeated Hechicero, Volador Jr., and Zandokan Jr. (with Tengu) 2–1	Two out of three falls trios match	13:19
4	Templario and Titán defeated El Galeón Fantasma (Difunto and Barboza) by pinfall	Copa Independencia tournament final	9:42
5	Rey Bucanero vs. El Felino ended in a double disqualification (Note: Since the match ended in a double disqualification, both men got their heads shaved)	Lucha de Apuestas Hair vs. Hair match	9:32
6	Místico (with Templario) defeated MJF (c) (with Jon Cruz) by submission	Lucha de Apuestas Title vs. Mask match for the CMLL World Light Heavyweight Championship	17:52
7	Esfinge and Valiente defeated Último Guerrero and Averno, and Dragón Rojo Jr. and Bárbaro Cavernario (with La Comandante) by pinfall	Three-way elimination tag team match Since Esfinge and Valiente won, they advanced to a Lucha de Apuestas Mask vs. Mask match against each other. (Note: Had Último Guerrero and Averno or Dragón Rojo Jr. and Bárbaro Cavernario won, they would've advanced to a Lucha de Apuestas Hair vs. Hair match against each other.)	12:54
8	Esfinge defeated Valiente (with Valiente Jr.) by pinfall	Lucha de Apuestas Mask vs. Mask match	16:10
(c) / – the champion(s) heading into the match

== See also ==
- 2025 in professional wrestling
- Grand Slam Mexico
