= CMLL 90th Anniversary Show =

Mexican professional wrestling show

- Promotion: Consejo Mundial de Lucha Libre
- Date: September 16, 2023
- City: Mexico City, Mexico
- Venue: Arena México

Consejo Mundial de Lucha Libre Anniversary Shows chronology
← Previous; CMLL 89th Anniversary Show	Next → CMLL 91st Anniversary Show

The CMLL 90th Anniversary Show (Spanish: 90. Aniversario de CMLL) was the 90th annual (and 101st overall) CMLL Anniversary Show professional wrestling pay-per-view event produced by Consejo Mundial de Lucha Libre (CMLL). It was held on September 16, 2023, at Arena México in Mexico City, Mexico.

== Production ==
=== Background ===
On June 19, 2023, on CMLL Informa, CMLL announced that their 90th anniversary show would take place at Arena México in Mexico City, Mexico on Saturday September 16, 2023, at 5:00 p.m. local time.

=== Storylines ===
The event featured eight professional wrestling matches that involve different wrestlers from pre-existing scripted feuds and storylines. Wrestlers portrayed heroes (technicos), villains (rudos), or less distinguishable characters in scripted events that built tension and culminated in a wrestling match or series of matches. Storylines were produced on CMLL's weekly Friday night show Super Viernes and on other CMLL events.

== Results ==
No.	Results	Stipulations	Times
1	Stephanie Vaquer and Zeuxis defeated Chicas Indomables (La Jarochita and Lluvia)	Tag team match to crown the inaugural CMLL World Women's Tag Team Champions	12:58
2	Esfinge defeated Rugido	Singles match This was the Copa Independencia tournament final	11:11
3	Atlantis, Blue Panther and Octagón defeated Fuerza Guerrera, Satánico and Virus 2-1	2-out-of-3 falls Legends trios match	11:36
4	Lucha House Party (Lince Dorado and Samuray de Sol) defeated Soberano Jr. and Titán 2-1	2-out-of-3 falls tag team match	20:29
5	Team CMLL (Atlantis Jr., Máscara Dorada 2.0 and Místico) defeated Team NJPW (Kevin Knight and The Havana Brothers (Rocky Romero and TJP)) 2-1	2-out-of-3 falls Trios match	20:34
6	Ángel de Oro and Volador Jr. defeated Averno and Último Guerrero	Parejas Incredibles tag team match The winners immediately faced each other in a Lucha de Apuestas Hair vs. Hair match	8:12
7	Volador Jr. defeated Ángel de Oro	Lucha de Apuestas Hair vs. Hair match	13:27
8	Templario defeated Dragon Rojo Jr.	Lucha de Apuestas Mask vs. Mask match	14:47

== See also ==
- 2023 in professional wrestling
