= CMLL Japan Women's Championship =

Professional wrestling women's championship

- The championship belt used from 1999 to 2001.

Details
- Promotion: Consejo Mundial de Lucha Libre (current); Lady's Ring (current); World Wonder Ring Stardom (current); Osaka Pro Wrestling (former)
- Date established: October 17, 1999 (original); January 22, 2020 (revived)
- Current champion: India Sioux
- Date won: March 15, 2026

Other names
- CMLL Japan Women's Championship (1999–2001); CMLL–Lady's Ring Japan Women's Championship (name used in Japan; 2020–present); CMLL Japanese Women's Championship (name used in Mexico; 2020–present)
Statistics
- First champion: Chikako Shiratori
- Most reigns: Chikako Shiratori and Dark Silueta (2)
- Longest reign: Dalys la Caribeña (3 years, 229 days)
- Shortest reign: La Diabólica (1–25 days)
- Oldest champion: Dalys la Caribeña (44 years, 336 days)
- Youngest champion: Chikako Shiratori (26 years, 114 days)

The CMLL Japan Women's Championship, (Note: Also styled as CMLL-Japan Women's Championship) also known as the CMLL–Lady's Ring Japan Women's Championship and the CMLL Japanese Women's Championship, is a women's professional wrestling championship, promoted by the Mexican lucha libre promotion Consejo Mundial de Lucha Libre (CMLL) and Japanese joshi puroresu promotion Lady's Ring. India Sioux is the current champion, the eleventh overall champion and her reign is the eighth since the championship was reactivated in 2020. She won by the title by defeating Hazuki at Stardom Cinderella Tournament: Night 5 on March 15, 2026, in Yokohama, Japan.

The championship was first introduced in 1999 as the CMLL Japan Women's Championship, when CMLL was touring Japan in hopes of expanding into the Japanese market. By 2000 CMLL ceased promoting shows regularly in Japan, loaning the CMLL Japan Women's Championship to Osaka Pro Wrestling, who kept promoting the championship until June 2001. The championship was reactivated as the CMLL Japanese Women's Championship in 2020 by CMLL and their Japan-based partner Lady's Ring, and would later also be recognized by the World Wonder Ring Stardom promotion. The inaugural and youngest champion is Chikako Shiratori at 26, while Dalys la Caribeña is the oldest at 44.

== Background ==
Lucha libre, or Mexican professional wrestling, is a form of entertainment where matches are presented as being competitive, but the outcome of the matches are pre-determined by their promoters. As part of presenting lucha libre as a genuine combat sport, promoters create championships that are used in the storylines presented on their shows but are not won as a result of genuinely competitive matches. The championship is typically represented by a belt for the champion to wear before or after a match.

In 1999, lucha libre promotion CMLL began to tour Japan, promoting a series of wrestling shows under the name "CMLL Japan" in association with booker Mr. Cacao. The shows featured a mixture of CMLL and Japanese wrestlers. CMLL partnered with smaller Japanese promotions such as Osaka Pro Wrestling (OPW) for these shows, as well as freelance Japanese wrestlers. As part of their efforts to establish themselves in Japan, CMLL introduce three CMLL Japan championships, the CMLL Japan Super Lightweight Championship, the CMLL Japan Tag Team Championship, and the CMLL Japan Women's Championship. The CMLL Japan Women's Championship was retired in June 2001.

In 2020, CMLL began working with the newly founded Japanese, all-female joshi puroresu Lady Ring promotion. CMLL had previously collaborated with Reina Joshi Puroresu for all-female shows in Japan and recognized the CMLL-Reina International Championship and the CMLL-Reina International Junior Championship but the collaboration would later end, with CMLL withdrawing their recognition of the championships. When the Lady's Ring collaboration was announced, CMLL also revealed that they were bringing back the CMLL Japan Women's Championship after 19 years of inactivity.

== Reigns ==
The CMLL Japan Women's Championship was unveiled on October 17, 1999, on a show in Osaka, Japan. Chikako Shiratori defeated Lady Apache, in a best-of-five match series to become the inaugural champion. Her initial reign lasted until sometime in November 1999 where La Diabólica won the title on a CMLL Japan show in Tokyo. La Diabólica's reign lasted only a matter of weeks before Shiratori regained the championship on November 25, 1999, in Kyoto, Japan. The CMLL Japan Women's Championship was actively defended in Japan after CMLL stopped touring. Shiratori's last documented championship defense took place on January 7, 2001, where she defeated Policewoman to retain the title. When Shiratori retired in June 2001, the CMLL Japan Women's Championship was also retired. On January 22, 2020, CMLL and Lady's Ring held their second joint show, Numero Dos, where the main event saw CMLL representative Dalys la Caribeña defeat Lady's Ring representative Mina Shirakawa in a best two-out-of-three falls match to win the reactivated championship.

India Sioux is the current champion, in her first reign. Her reign is the eleventh overall reign and she is the eighth person to hold the championship. La Diabólica's reign lasted between 1 and 25 days and is the shortest reign on record. Dalys la Caribeña's reign lasted 1,326 days, the longest of any of the championship reigns.

== Title history ==
Key
No.	Overall reign number
Reign	Reign number for the specific champion
Days	Number of days held

No.	Champion	Championship change			Reign statistics		Notes	Ref.
No.	Champion	Date	Event	Location	Reign	Days	Notes	Ref.
Consejo Mundial de Lucha Libre (CMLL) and Osaka Pro Wrestling (OPW)
1	Chikako Shiratori	October 17, 1999	House show	Osaka, Japan	1	381–404	Chikako Shiratori defeated Lady Apache in the finals of a "best of five matches series" to become the inaugural champion. This was a CMLL Japan event.	
2	La Diabólica	November 2000	House show	Tokyo, Japan	1	1–25	This was a CMLL Japan event.	
3	Chikako Shiratori	November 25, 2000	House show	Kyoto, Japan	2	195	This was a CMLL Japan event.	
—	Deactivated	June 8, 2001	—	—	—	—	Shiratori retired from professional wrestling without losing the championship.	
Consejo Mundial de Lucha Libre (CMLL), Lady's Ring, and World Wonder Ring Stardom (Stardom)
4	Dalys la Caribeña	January 22, 2020	Numero Dos	Tokyo, Japan	1	1,326	Caribeña defeated Mina Shirakawa in a best two-out-of-three falls match to win the reactivated championship. This was a Lady's Ring event.	
—	Vacated	September 8, 2023	—	—	—	—	Vacated due to Dalys la Caribeña signing with Lucha Libre AAA Worldwide.	
5	Dark Silueta	September 17, 2023	CMLL Lady's Ring	Kawasaki, Japan	1	285	Silueta defeated Kohaku to win the vacant championship. This was a Lady's Ring event.	
6	Unagi Sayaka	June 28, 2024	CMLL Lady's Ring Lucha Fiesta #2	Tokyo, Japan	1	246	This was a Lady's Ring event.	
7	Lluvia	March 1, 2025	CMLL Lady's Lucha Fiesta #3	Tokyo, Japan	1	125	This was a Lady's Ring event.	
8	Dark Silueta	July 4, 2025	CMLL Viernes Espectacular	Mexico City, Mexico	2	68	This was a CMLL event.	
9	Koguma	September 10, 2025	Stardom Nighter in Korakuen	Tokyo, Japan	1	31	This was a World Wonder Ring Stardom event.	
10	Hazuki	October 11, 2025	Stardom in Korakuen	Tokyo, Japan	1	155	This was a World Wonder Ring Stardom event.	
11	India Sioux	March 15, 2026	Stardom Cinderella Tournament (Night 5)	Yokohama, Japan	1	247+	This was a World Wonder Ring Stardom event.	

== Combined reigns ==
As of November 17, 2026.

†	Indicates the current champion.
¤	The exact length of a title reign is uncertain; the combined length may not be correct.

Rank	Wrestler	No. of Reigns	Combined Days
1	Dalys la Caribeña	1	1,326
2	Chikako Shiratori	2	381–404¤
3	Dark Silueta	2	353
5	India Sioux †	1	247+
4	Unagi Sayaka	1	246
6	Hazuki	1	155
7	Lluvia	1	125
8	Koguma	1	31
9	La Diabólica	1	1–25¤
