= Zeuxis (wrestler) =

Puerto Rican professional wrestler (born 1988)

Personal information
- Born: November 3, 1988 (age 37) San Juan, Puerto Rico

Professional wrestling career
- Ring name(s): Seuxis; Zeuxis
- Billed height: 1.63 m (5 ft 4 in)
- Billed weight: 67 kg (148 lb)
- Trained by: Franco Columbo; Huracán Ramírez; Negro Navarro; El Satánico
- Debut: April 29, 2008

Zeuxis (born November 3, 1988) is a Puerto Rican luchadora enmascarada, or masked female professional wrestler, performing for Mexican professional wrestling promotion Consejo Mundial de Lucha Libre (CMLL), where she was the CMLL World Women's Champion, and was one-half of the inaugural CMLL World Women's Tag Team Champions, alongside Stephanie Vaquer. She also makes regular tours of Japan with the Reina Joshi Puroresu promotion. Zeuxis' real name is not a matter of public record, as is often the case with masked wrestlers in Mexico where their private lives are kept a secret from the wrestling fans.

== Professional wrestling career ==
=== Consejo Mundial de Lucha Libre (2009–2018) ===
==== Early years (2009–2013) ====
The wrestler known as Zeuxis was born in Puerto Rico, but lived and trained for her professional wrestling debut in Mexico. She was initially trained by Negro Navarro before making her debut, and later by El Satánico when she joined Consejo Mundial de Lucha Libre (CMLL) She made her in-ring wrestling debut on April 29, 2008, working on the Mexican independent circuit. Zeuxis joined CMLL in early 2009 and initially worked as a tecnica (wrestlers who portray the "good guy" characters, also known as "faces"). By the end of 2009 she had switched sides and began working as a ruda ("bad guy") instead. CMLL booked Zeuxis in a storyline with tecnica newcomer Silueta that developed over mid-2010. The storyline started out with the two being on opposite sides of a number of two out of three falls six-woman tag team matches where Zeuxis focused on trying to unmask her opponent, going so far as to rip Silueta's mask apart. The storyline led to a lucha de apuestas, or "Bet match" between the two where the loser of the match would be forced to unmask and state their birth name after the loss as per Lucha Libre traditions. Zeuxis was successful, winning two of the three falls to force Silueta to unmask and reveal that her birthname was Joana Guadalupe Jiménez Hernández. Through her work in CMLL Zeuxis was invited to wrestle in Japan on several occasions, primarily for Universal Woman's Pro Wrestling Reina (Reina for short).

In April 2011, she was one of seven wrestlers who took part in a tournament to determine the first ever CMLL-Reina International Junior Champion. Zeuxis defeated Sendai Sachiko in the semi-final round, but was defeated by Ray in the finals of the tournament. Later Zeuxis teamed up with fellow CMLL wrestler La Comandante to compete in a tournament to crown the inaugural Reina World Tag Team Champions. In the first round the team defeated Aki Kanbayashi and Saya in the first round and then defeated the team known as the "Canadian NINJAs" (Nicole Matthews and Portia Perez) to become the first champions. The duo held the championship until December 6, when they lost it to Lluvia and Luna Mágica on a CMLL show in Mexico City. In early 2012 Zeuxis regained the championship by teaming with Mima Shimoda to defeat Lluvia and Luna Mágica. 50 days later Universal Woman's Pro Wrestling Reina closed and Reina X World was created to succeed it; at the time Mima Shimoda decided not to work for Reina X World, vacating the tag team championship. Zeuxis did work for Reina X World, teaming up with La Comandante once again for the tournament to crown the next champions, but were defeated in the first round by Aki Kanbayashi and Aoi Ishibashi.

==== Comando Caribeño (2013–2018) ====
On May 9, 2013, CMLL introduced a new Comandante Pierroth, a character based on the original Pierroth character. The new Comandante Pierroth was announced as the leader of a new faction called La Comando Caribeño ("The Caribbean Commando") consisting of members of the original Pierroth's Los Boriquas of Pierrothito, Pequeño Violencia, La Comandante, and added Zeuxis to the group as well. On June 4, Zeuxis defeated Silueta to win the CMLL-Reina International Junior Championship. On September 8, Zeuxis won the Reina World Tag Team Championship for the third time, this time with La Vaquerita. On September 20, Zeuxis was given the opportunity to become a triple champion in Reina, but she was defeated in a match for the vacant Reina World Women's Championship by Syuri. On November 2, Zeuxis and La Vaquerita lost the Reina World Tag Team Championship to Aki Shizuku and Aliya. On August 3, 2014, Zeuxis lost the CMLL-Reina International Junior Championship back to Silueta.

On September 19, as part of the CMLL 81st Anniversary Show, Zeuxis won the Copa 81 Aniversario by outlasting La Amapola, Dalys la Caribeña, Estrellita, Marcela, Goya Kong, Princesa Sugehit, and Tiffany in a torneo cibernetico elimination match. On January 19, 2015, Zeuxis defeated Estrellita to win the Mexican National Women's Championship. In September 2016 Zeuxis was one of several female wrestlers who tried out for WWE, for a potential full-time role with the company or for a future all women's tournament. On February 25, 2017, Zeuxis lost the Mexican National Women's Championship to Princesa Sugehit, ending her reign after 768 days. On September 16, 2017, Zeuxis took Sugehit's mask in a Lucha de Apuestas at CMLL's 84th Anniversary Show. On May 21, 2018, Zeuxis announced her departure from CMLL.

=== Lucha Libre AAA Worldwide (2018) ===
On June 26, 2018 Zeuxis was announced as working for Lucha Libre AAA Worldwide, representing the Liga Elite alongside a number of other independent wrestlers. On July 21, 2018, at AAA vs. Elite, Zeuxis made her debut in AAA teaming with Lady Maravilla and Keira, losing to the team of Faby Apache, La Hiedra and Vanilla.

=== WWE (2018) ===
On July 25, 2018 it was announced that Zeuxis will be a participant of the 2018 Mae Young Classic. She made it to the second round, defeating Aerial Monroe before losing to Io Shirai.

=== Return to CMLL (2023–present) ===
On February 10, 2023, Zeuxis made her return to CMLL, teaming up with Stephanie Vaquer to defeat Marcela and Princesa Sugehit. On March 21, Zeuxis and Vaquer defeated Las Chicas Indomables La Jarochita and Lluvia to become the inaugural Occidente Women's Tag Team Champions. On September 16, at the CMLL 90th Anniversary Show, they defeated Las Chicas Indomables again, this time to become the inaugural CMLL World Women's Tag Team Champions. On July 10, 2024, it was announced that Vaquer was departing CMLL, with both the CMLL World Women's Championship and CMLL World Women's Tag Team Championships being vacated in the process. On September 13 at the CMLL 91st Anniversary Show, Zeuxis defeated Willow Nightingale to win the CMLL World Women's Championship. On June 18, 2025, at Grand Slam Mexico, Zeuxis lost her title to Mercedes Moné, ending her reign at 278 days.

== Personal life ==
Zeuxis was born in San Juan, Puerto Rico. During high school she studied music, but later became interested in physical rehabilitation and through that began working as a paramedic. She works both for the Mexican Red Cross and a Mexican Children's hospital. When she made her debut in 2008 she stopped working as a full-time paramedic but often helps her fellow wrestlers with their injuries and physical rehabilitation due to her background and experience. Her background also helped her deal with having her leg broken during a match with Goya Kong.

== Championships and accomplishments ==
- Alto Voltaje Lucha Libre
  - Alto Voltaje Women’s Cup (2024)
- Consejo Mundial de Lucha Libre
  - CMLL World Women's Championship (1 time)
  - CMLL World Women's Tag Team Championship (1 time, inaugural) – with Stephanie Vaquer
  - Mexican National Women's Championship (1 time)
  - Occidente Women's Tag Team Championship (1 time) – with Stephanie Vaquer
  - Occidente Women's Tag Team Championship Tournament (2023) – with Stephanie Vaquer
  - Copa 81. Aniversario
  - Torneo Femenil 60. Aniversario de la Arena México (2016)
  - International Torneo Cibernetico De Amazonas 2024 (Puebla)
  - Copa 70 Aniversario de la Arena Mexico de Amazonas
  - Copa Bobby Bonales 2025
- Reina Joshi Puroresu / Reina X World / Universal Woman's Pro Wrestling Reina
  - CMLL-Reina International Championship (1 time, final)
  - CMLL-Reina International Junior Championship (1 time)
  - Reina World Tag Team Championship (3 times) – with La Comandante (1), Mima Shimoda (1), and La Vaquerita (1)
  - Reina World tag Team Championship Tournament (2011) – with La Comandante
  - Reina World tag Team Championship Tournament (2013) – with La Vaquerita
- Other championships
  - CWA Women's Championship (1 time)

== Luchas de Apuestas record ==
Winner (wager)	Loser (wager)	Location	Event	Date	Notes
Zeuxis (mask)	Silueta (mask)	Guadalajara, Jalisco, Mexico	CMLL Live event	July 18, 2010	
Zeuxis (mask)	La Vaquerita (mask)	Mexico City, Mexico	Infierno en el Ring	December 25, 2016	(Note: Last two wrestlers in a 10-woman steel cage match that also included La Jarochita, Sanely, Princesa Sugehit, Marcela, Estellita, Dalys, La Amapola and Metálica)
Zeuxis (mask)	Princesa Sugehit (mask)	Mexico City, Mexico	CMLL 84th Anniversary Show	September 16, 2017	
