= Rey Celestial =

Mexican professional wrestler

Oscar Leonardo Flores Parra

Personal information
- Born: August 29, 1995 Heróica Puebla de Zaragoza, Puebla, Mexico
- Died: September 17, 2017 (aged 22) Puebla, Mexico

Professional wrestling career
- Ring name: Rey Celestial
- Billed height: 1.56 m (5 ft 1 1/2 in)
- Trained by: Bisonte; Cobra Dorada; Pegasso; Loco Max
- Debut: 2010

Oscar Leonardo Flores Parra (August 29, 1995 – September 17, 2017), better known by his ring name Rey Celestial, was a Mexican professional wrestler best known for his time working in Lucha Libre AAA Worldwide. In 2012, he was one of the winners of their talent search show ¿Quién Pinta para la Corona? which led to him working several TV-shows for the promotion. However he spent most of his career working in the promotion Desastre Total Ultraviolento (DTU).

In 2017 he signed a contract with The Crash Lucha Libre, and worked his first show for the promotion in San Luis Potosí five days prior to his death.

On September 17, 2017, Rey Celestial was killed in a hit and run incident while out walking in his hometown of Puebla. He was survived by his wife, Consejo Mundial de Lucha Libre wrestler, La Magnífica, and their daughter. He was honored by his previous employer, Lucha Libre AAA Worldwide.

== Championships and accomplishments ==
- Lucha Libre AAA Worldwide
  - Quién Pinta Para La Corona (2012, Mini's division)
