= CMLL 91st Anniversary Show =

Mexican professional wrestling show

- Promotion: Consejo Mundial de Lucha Libre
- Date: September 13, 2024
- City: Mexico City, Mexico
- Venue: Arena México

Consejo Mundial de Lucha Libre Anniversary Shows chronology
| ← Previous; CMLL 90th Anniversary Show | Next → CMLL 92nd Anniversary Show |

The CMLL 91st Anniversary Show (Spanish: 91. Aniversario de CMLL) was the 91st annual (and 102nd overall) CMLL Anniversary Show professional wrestling pay-per-view event produced by Consejo Mundial de Lucha Libre (CMLL). It was held on September 13, 2024, at Arena México in Mexico City, Mexico.

== Production ==
=== Background ===
On June 15, 2024, Consejo Mundial de Lucha Libre (CMLL), on their official Twitter account, announced that their 91st annual anniversary show would take place at Arena México in Mexico City, Mexico on Friday September 13, 2024 as part of Mexican independence day weekend, a major weekend for Mexican combat sports. The 2024 Mexican independence day is notable for being the first to host major Mexican-themed lucha libre (CMLL 91st Anniversary Show), boxing (Canelo Álvarez vs. Edgar Berlanga), and mixed martial arts (Riyadh Season Noche UFC) events on the same weekend.

=== Storylines ===
The event featured seven professional wrestling matches that involved different wrestlers from pre-existing scripted feuds and storylines. Wrestlers portrayed heroes (tecnicos), villains (rudos), or less distinguishable characters in scripted events that built tension and culminated in a wrestling match or series of matches. Storylines were produced on CMLL's weekly Friday night show Super Viernes and on other CMLL events.

== Results ==
| No. | Results | Stipulations | Times |
|---|---|---|---|
| 1 | Los Viajeros del Espacio (Hombre Bala Jr., Futuro, and Max Star) defeated Los Depredadores (Magia Blanca, Magnus, and Rugido) (with Mije) by pinfall | Trios match | 8:37 |
| 2 | Los Hermanos Chavez (Ángel de Oro and Niebla Roja) and Soberano Jr. defeated Templario, Star Jr., and Neón (with KeMalito) 2–1 | Two out of three falls trios match | 17:11 |
| 3 | Titán defeated Máscara Dorada by submission | Copa Independencia tournament final | 14:40 |
| 4 | Zeuxis defeated Willow Nightingale (c) by pinfall | Singles match for the CMLL World Women's Championship | 11:07 |
| 5 | Team Mexico (Volador Jr., Atlantis Jr., and Último Guerrero) (with Zacarías) defeated Team International (Orange Cassidy, Rocky Romero, and Satoshi Kojima) 2–1 | Two out of three falls trios match | 14:26 |
| 6 | Hechicero defeated Euforia by submission Also in the match: Esfinge and Valiente | Four-way Lucha de Apuestas Mask vs. Mask match | 36:05 |
| 7 | Místico defeated Chris Jericho (with Big Bill) 2–1 | Two out of three falls match | 22:11 |
(c) / – the champion(s) heading into the match

== See also ==
- 2024 in professional wrestling
