= List of CMLL World Light Heavyweight Champions =

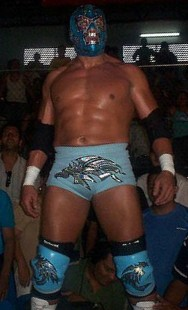
Dr. Wagner Jr., one of two men to hold the CMLL World Light Heavyweight Championship twice.

The CMLL World Light Heavyweight Championship (Campeonato Mundial Semi Completo de CMLL in Spanish) is a singles professional wrestling world championship promoted by Consejo Mundial de Lucha Libre (CMLL) since 1991. As it is a professional wrestling championship, it is not won legitimately: it is instead won via a scripted ending to a match or awarded to a wrestler because of a storyline. The official definition of the Light Heavyweight weight class in Mexico is between 92 kg (203 lb) and 97 kg (214 lb), but is not always strictly enforced. (Note: The most recent case of this is Mephisto's holding the NWA World Welterweight Championship, a belt with a 78 kg (172 lb) upper limit despite weighing 90 kg (200 lb).) Because Lucha Libre emphasizes the lower weight classes, this division is considered more important than the normally more prestigious heavyweight division of a promotion. All title matches take place under two out of three falls rules.

Místico is the current champion, in his first reign. He won the title by defeating MJF in a Title vs. Mask match at the CMLL 92nd Anniversary Show on September 19, 2025 in Mexico City, Mexico.

The first champion to be recognized by CMLL was Jerry Estrada, who defeated Pierroth Jr. in the finals of a 16-man tournament that took place between September 15 and September 26, 1991. Overall, there have been twenty reigns shared among eighteen wrestlers, and two vacancies. Dr. Wagner Jr. and Atlantis are the only two wrestlers to have held the title twice; Dr. Wagner Jr. is listed as an unofficial three-time champion, but he is not recognized as such by CMLL. (Note: Before the Internet made information readily available on a global scale, it was not uncommon for championships to be lost and won back during a tour of a foreign country without being recognized by the promotion.) MJF's sole reign is the shortest at 49 days, while Niebla Roja's sole reign is the longest at 1,861 days. Aquarius' unofficial title reign is the shortest on record, 8 days, but is not acknowledged by CMLL.

== Title history ==
Key
No.	Overall reign number
Reign	Reign number for the specific champion
Days	Number of days held
Days recog.	Number of days held recognized by the promotion
N/A	Unknown information
+	Current reign is changing daily

No.	Champion	Championship change			Reign statistics			Notes	Ref.
No.	Champion	Date	Event	Location	Reign	Days	Days recog.	Notes	Ref.
Consejo Mundial de Lucha Libre (CMLL)
1	Jerry Estrada	September 26, 1991	Live event	Cuernavaca, Mexico	1	175	175	Defeated Pierroth Jr. in a tournament final	^{[G]}
2	Pierroth Jr.	March 19, 1992	Live event	Cuernavaca, Mexico	1	379	379		^{[G]}
3	Dr. Wagner Jr.	April 2, 1993	Live event	Mexico City, Distrito Federal	1	334	334		^{[G]}
4	Atlantis	March 2, 1994	Live event	Acapulco, Mexico	1	655	655		^{[G]}
5	Dr. Wagner Jr.	December 17, 1995	Live event	Mexico City, Distrito Federal	2	215	1,240		^{[G]}
†	Aquarius	July 19, 1996	Live event	Tokyo, Japan	1	8	—	Title change is not officially recognized by CMLL	^{[G]}
†	Dr. Wagner Jr.	July 27, 1996	Live event	Sapporo, Japan	3	1,017	—	CMLL does not recognize Dr. Wagner Jr. as a three-time champion as they do not recognize Aquarius' title win.	^{[G]}
6	Atlantis	May 10, 1999	Live event	Puebla, Mexico	2	196	196		^{[G]}
7	Villano III	November 22, 1999	Live event	Tampico, Mexico	1	685	685		^{[G]}
8	Shocker	October 7, 2001	Live event	Guadalajara, Mexico	1	432	432		
9	Último Guerrero	December 13, 2002	Live event	Mexico City, Distrito Federal	1	1,309	1,309		
10	Rey Bucanero	July 14, 2006	Live event	Mexico City, Distrito Federal	1	1,047	1,047		
11	Ephesto	May 26, 2009	Live event	Mexico City, Distrito Federal	1	637	637		
12	Rush	February 22, 2011	Live event	Mexico City, Distrito Federal	1	693	693		
—	Vacated	January 15, 2013	Live event	Mexico City, Distrito Federal	—	—	—	Rush vacated the title to get a match for the CMLL World Heavyweight Championship.	
13	Rey Escorpión	January 29, 2013	Live event	Mexico City, Distrito Federal	1	637	637	Defeated Volador Jr. in a tournament final.	
14	Ángel de Oro	October 28, 2014	Live event	Mexico City, Distrito Federal	1	528	528		
15	La Máscara	April 8, 2016	Super Viernes	Mexico City, Distrito Federal	1	409	409		
—	Vacated	May 22, 2017	—	—	—	—	—	La Máscara was stripped of the title when he was fired by CMLL.	
16	Niebla Roja	June 10, 2017	Live event	Mexico City, Distrito Federal	1	1,861	1,861	Won a 10-man Torneo Cibernetico match to win the vacant title.	
17	Bárbaro Cavernario	July 15, 2022	Super Viernes	Mexico City, Distrito Federal	1	623	623		
18	Averno	March 29, 2024	Homenaje A Dos Leyendas	Mexico City, Distrito Federal	1	490	490		
19	MJF	August 1, 2025	Super Viernes	Mexico City, Distrito Federal	1	49	49	During this reign, MJF unofficially renamed the title simply the CMLL World Championship while on All Elite Wrestling programming, although it was still officially recognized as the World Light Heavyweight Championship by CMLL.	
20	Místico	September 19, 2025	CMLL 92nd Anniversary Show	Mexico City, Distrito Federal	1	409+	409+	This was a Title vs. Mask match.	

== Combined reigns ==
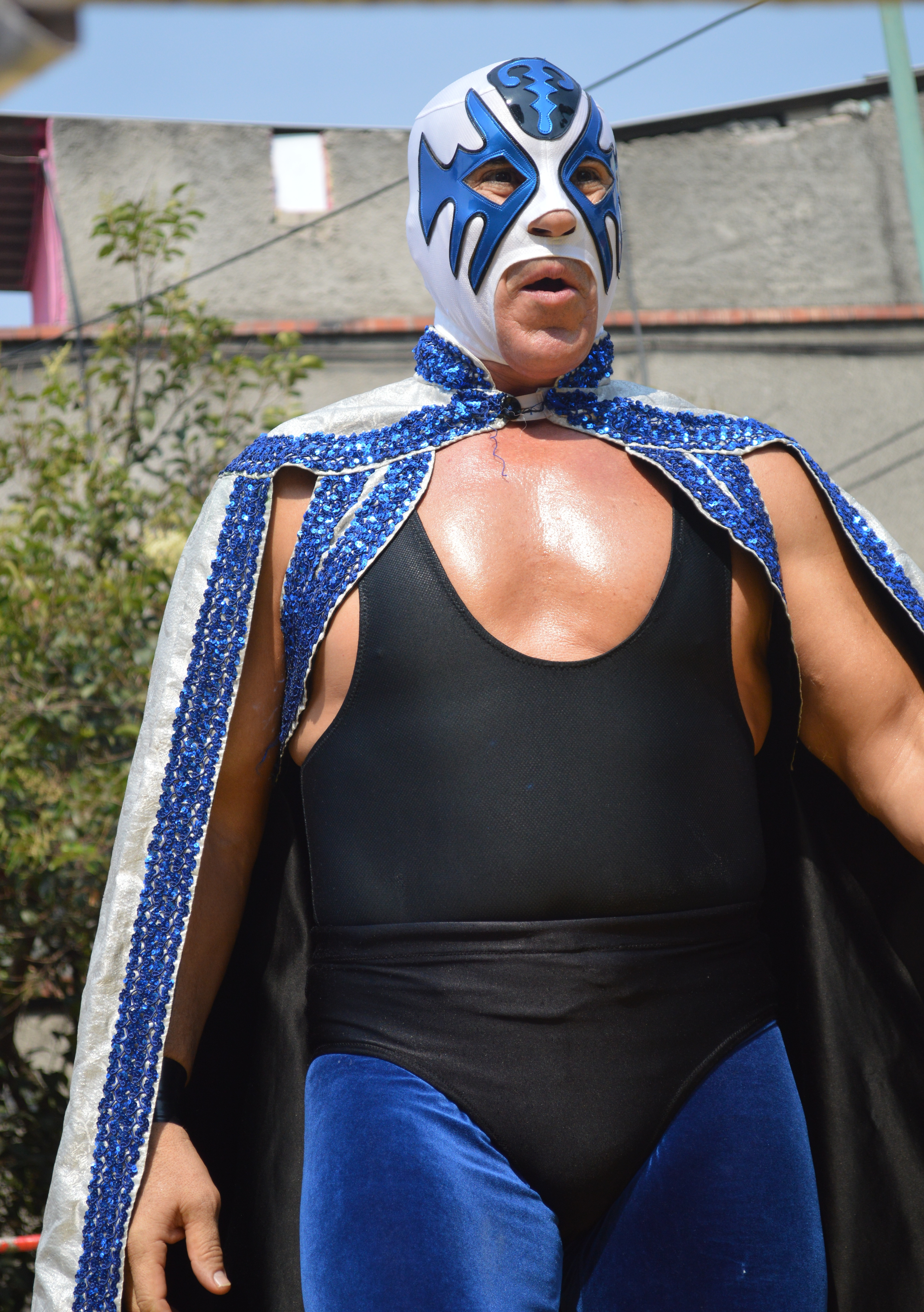
Atlantis, two time CMLL World Light Heavyweight Champion.

As of November 2, 2026.

†	Indicates the current champion

Rank	Wrestler	No. of reigns	Combined days	Ref(s).
1	Niebla Roja	1	1,861	
2	Dr. Wagner Jr.	2	1,574	^{[G]}
3	Último Guerrero	1	1,309	
4	Rey Bucanero	1	1,047	
5	Atlantis	2	851	^{[G]}
6	Rush	1	693	
7	Villano III	1	685	^{[G]}
8	Ephesto	1	637	
9	Rey Escorpión	1	637	
10	Bárbaro Cavernario	1	623	
11	Ángel de Oro	1	528	
12	Averno	1	490	
13	Shocker	1	432	
14	Místico †	1	409+	
15	La Máscara	1	409	
16	Pierroth Jr.	1	379	^{[G]}
17	Jerry Estrada	1	175	^{[G]}
18	MJF	1	49	
19	Aquarius	1	8	^{[G]}
