= La Magnífica =

Mexican professional wrestler (born 1989)

Personal information
- Born: March 30, 1989 (age 37) Jalisco, Mexico
- Spouse: Rey Celestial (died 2017)
- Children: 1
- Parents: Gran Cochisse (father); La Magnífica (mother)
- Relatives: Super Estrella (sister); Saturno (brother); Oro Negro (cousin); El Chabelo (uncle)

Professional wrestling career
- Ring name: La Magnífica
- Billed height: 1.60 m (5 ft 3 in)
- Billed weight: 60 kg (132 lb)
- Trained by: Gran Cochisse; El Satánico
- Debut: May 2007

Tamara Rubí Barrón García (born March 30, 1989), known under the ring name La Magnífica (Spanish for "The Magnificent"), is a Mexican professional wrestler working for the Mexican promotion Consejo Mundial de Lucha Libre (CMLL). La Magnifica is a second-generation wrestler, the daughter of Gran Cochisse.

== Professional wrestling career ==
On April 3, 2009, La Magnífica was booked in an eight-woman torneo cibernetico where all eight women would risk their mask on the outcome of the match, with the last person eliminated would be forced to unmask per the Luchas de Apuestas ("Bet match") rules. In addition to her, the match also included Lluvia, La Seductora, Estrella Magica, Princesa Sujei, Atenea, Coral, and Silueta. The match came down to Lluvia and La Magnífica, with Lluvia winning the match, forcing La Magnífica to unmask and reveal her real name.

Following a period of hiatus that required her to undergo two surgeries, La Magnífica returned to in ring action in May 2025, later forming a stable with Marcela, Princesa Sugehit, dubbed Las Artemisas, which imploded in January 2026. On March 6, 2026, she won the Copa Irma Gonzalez.

== Personal life ==
La Magnífica is the daughter of professional wrestler Gran Cochisse and the original La Magnífica as well as the sister of Super Estrella and Saturno who also works for CMLL. She is also the sister-in-law of wrestler El Sagrado who is married to one of La Magnífica's sisters that is not involved in professional wrestling.

La Magnífica was married to Rey Celestial until he was killed in a hit and run incident while out walking in his hometown of Puebla on September 17, 2017. She has a daughter from this marriage.

== Championships and accomplishments ==
- Arena Azteca Budokan
  - AAB International Women's Championship (1 time)
- Lucha Libre AAA Worldwide
  - AAA Quien Pinta Para La Corona (2011)
- Consejo Mundial de Lucha Libre
  - Copa Irma González (2026)
- New Wrestling Generation
  - NWG Divas Championship (1 time)

== Luchas de Apuestas record ==
Winner (wager)	Loser (wager)	Location	Event	Date	Notes
Lluvia (mask)	La Magnífica (mask)	Guadalajara, Jalisco	CMLL Live event	April 3, 2009	(Note: last two competitors in an eight woman torneo cibernetico that also included La Seductora, Estrella Magica, Princesa Sujei, Atenea, Coral, Silueta.)
Ludark Shaitan (hair)	La Magnífica (hair)	Ciudad Nezahualcóyotl, State of Mexico	Live event	December 17, 2016	
Shitara DTR (hair)	La Magnífica (hair)	Puebla, Puebla	Live event	July 30, 2017	
