= CMLL-Reina International Junior Championship =

Professional wrestling women's championship

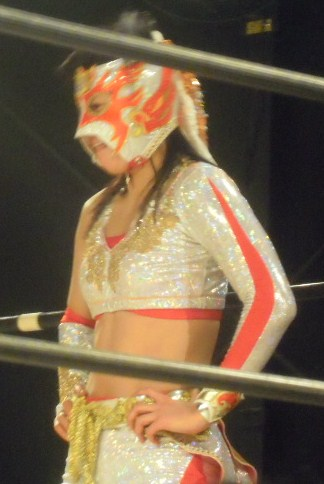
- Inaugural champion Ray

Details
- Promotion: Consejo Mundial de Lucha Libre; Reina Joshi Puroresu; Actwres girl'Z
- Date established: September 10, 2011
- Date retired: November 6, 2019
Statistics
- First champion: Ray
- Most reigns: Silueta (three reigns)
- Longest reign: Silueta (883 days)
- Shortest reign: Silueta (5 days)
- Oldest champion: Ray (29 years, 208 days)
- Youngest champion: Zeuxis (24 years, 213 days)
- Heaviest champion: Zeuxis 64 kg (141 lb)
- Lightest champion: Ray 53 kg (117 lb)

The CMLL-Reina International Junior Championship (Campeonato Internacional Junior del CMLL-Reina in Spanish; CMLL-Reina Intānashonaru Junia Ōza (CMLL-Reinaインターナショナルジュニア王座) in Japanese) was a women's professional wrestling championship promoted by Consejo Mundial de Lucha Libre (CMLL) and Reina Joshi Puroresu. The championship was created in September 2011 in the Universal Woman's Pro Wrestling Reina (UWWR) promotion, later gaining additional recognition from CMLL. Following the dissolution of UWWR in May 2012, the title moved over to Reina X World, later renamed Reina Joshi Puroresu. The title was meant for women who have wrestled for less than ten years.

== History ==
The creation of CMLL-Reina International Junior Championship was announced on August 7, 2011. The tournament to crown the inaugural champion was featured by wrestlers from Consejo Mundial de Lucha Libre of Mexico and Universal Woman's Pro Wrestling Reina of Japan. Ray became the first champion after defeated Zeuxis in a Two out of three falls match. The final champion was Kaho Kobayashi, who defeated La Jarochita on September 15, 2017, in Tokyo to win the vacant title.

== Title history ==
Key
No.	Overall reign number
Reign	Reign number for the specific champion
Days	Number of days held

No.	Champion	Championship change			Reign statistics		Notes	Ref.
No.	Champion	Date	Event	Location	Reign	Days	Notes	Ref.
Consejo Mundial De Lucha Libre and Reina
1	Ray	September 10, 2011	Reina 12	Edogawa, Tokyo, Japan	1	38	Ray defeated Zeuxis in the final of a seven-woman tournament to become the inaugural champion.	
2	Silueta	October 18, 2011	CMLL Martes de Arena México	Mexico City, Mexico	1	594		
3	Zeuxis	June 4, 2013	CMLL Guadalajara Martes	Guadalajara, Jalisco, Mexico	1	425		
4	Silueta	August 3, 2014	CMLL Domingos de Coliseo	Mexico City, Mexico	2	5		
5	Maki Narumiya	August 8, 2014	CMLL-Reina Fiesta	Warabi, Saitama, Japan	1	22		
6	Silueta	August 30, 2014	CMLL-Reina Fiesta 2014 Saishū-sen	Bunkyo, Tokyo, Japan	3	883		
7	Keira	January 29, 2017	Lucha Memes Chairo8	Mexico City, Mexico	1	N/A		
—	Vacated	N/A	—	—	—	—	Title was vacated for unknown reasons.	
Actwres girl'Z
8	Kaho Kobayashi	September 15, 2017	Gran Fiesta 2017 Numero 3	Kōtō, Tokyo, Japan	1	782	Kobayashi defeated La Jarochita to win the vacant championship. In 2018, the title began being defended in Kobayashi's home promotion Actwres girl'Z.	
—	Deactivated	November 6, 2019	—	—	—	—	CMLL ended their working relationship with Reina and the championship was retired.	

== Combined reigns ==
Rank	Wrestler	No. of reigns	Combined days
1	Silueta	3	1,482
2	Kaho Kobayashi	1	782
3	Zeuxis	1	425
4	Ray	1	38
5	Maki Narumiya	1	22
—	Keira	1	N/A (Note: The length of Keira's championship reigns is unknown.)

== Championship tournament ==
The tournament to crown the inaugural CMLL-Reina International Junior Champion ran from August 14 to September 10, 2011, and featured seven competitors. The final was held between Hong Kong's Ray and the Puerto Rico's Zeuxis.

First Round
Luscious Latasha	(9:55)
Ray	W
Mia Yim	W
Saya	(7:59)
Dama de Hierro	(8:25)
Sendai Sachiko	W
Bye
Zeuxis	W

Semifinals
Ray	W
Mia Yim	(10:43)
Sendai Sachiko	(9:24)
Zeuxis	W

Final
Ray	W
Zeuxis	(10:39)
