= CMLL-Reina International Championship =

Professional wrestling women's championship

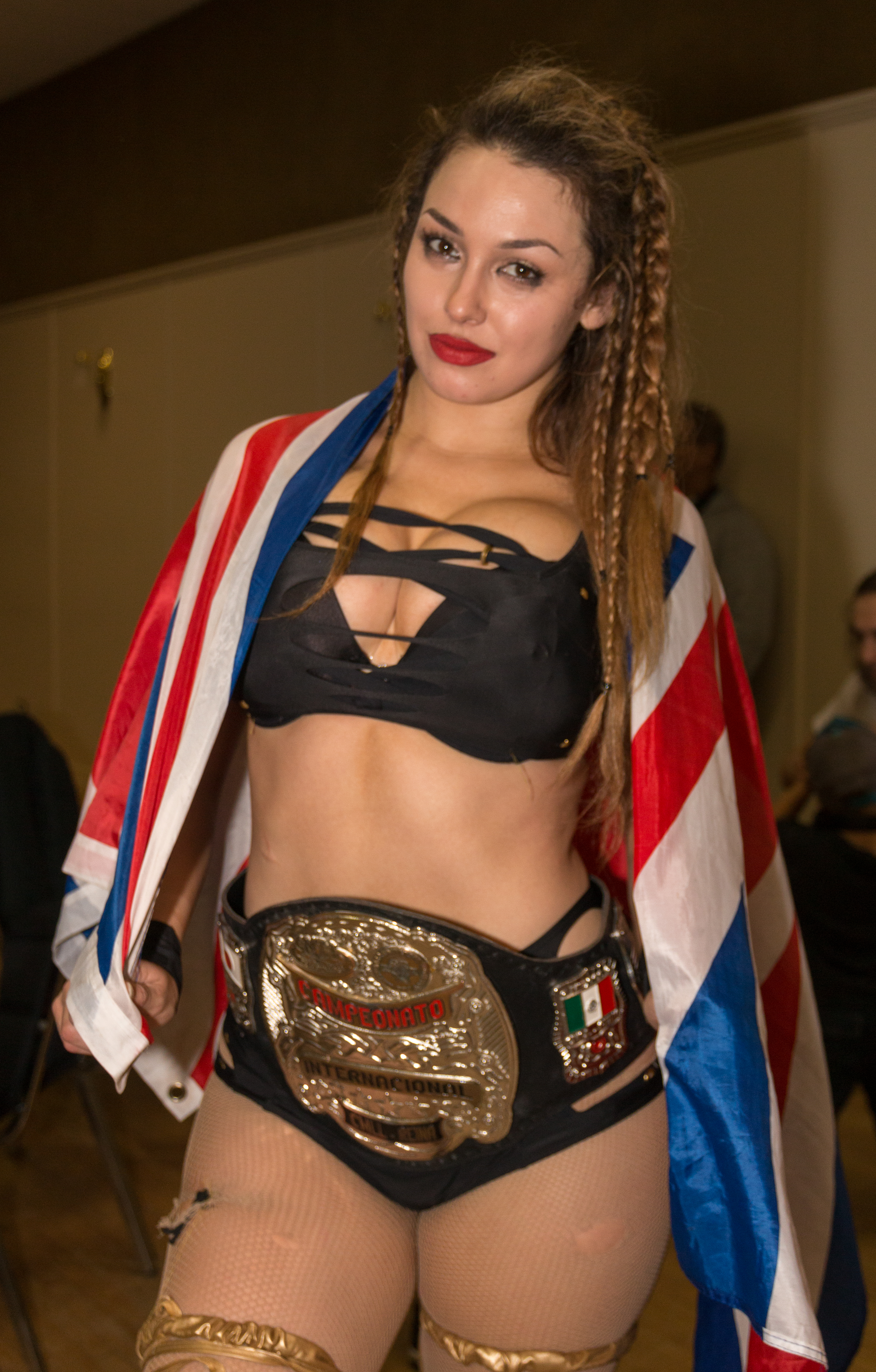
- Heidi Katrina posing with the championship in November 2016

Details
- Promotion: Consejo Mundial de Lucha Libre; Reina Joshi Puroresu
- Date established: August 26, 2012
- Date retired: November 6, 2019

Other name(s)
- Reina-CMLL International Championship
Statistics
- First champion(s): Leon
- Most reigns: La Amapola, Leon and Maki Narumiya (2 reigns)
- Longest reign: Zeuxis (815 days)
- Shortest reign: Command Bolshoi (8 days)
- Oldest champion: La Amapola (36 years, 33 days) (Note: During her career, Bolshoi kept her real identity in privet, including her real name and date of birth.)
- Youngest champion: Arisa Nakajima (24 years, 113 days)
- Heaviest champion: La Amapola, Arisa Nakajima and Leon (60 kg (130 lb))
- Lightest champion: Command Bolshoi (50 kg (110 lb))

The CMLL-Reina International Championship (Campeonato Internacional del CMLL-Reina in Spanish; CMLL-Reina Intānashonaru Ōza (CMLL-Reinaインターナショナル王座) in Japanese) was a women's professional wrestling championship promoted by Consejo Mundial de Lucha Libre (CMLL) and Reina Joshi Puroresu. When the title was created, it was first called the Reina-CMLL International Championship, but the names of the promotions have since been switched around in the title's name.

== Title history ==
Universal Woman's Pro Wrestling Reina held a tournament to crown the first champion on August 26, 2012, involving four wrestlers from Consejo Mundial de Lucha Libre of Mexico and Reina of Japan. During the finals of the tournament, Leon defeated Tiffany to become the inaugural champion.

=== Inaugural tournament ===
Semifinals
La Malcrida
Tiffany	W
Leon	W
Alex Lee

Final
Tiffany
Leon	W

== Reigns ==
Over the championship's seven-year history, there have been 12 reigns between nine champions and three vacancies. Leon was the inaugural champion. Leon, alongside La Amapola and Maki Narumiya, are tied with most reign at two. Zeuxis, the last titleholder, has the longest reign at 815 days, while Command Bolshoi's reign is the shortest at eight days. Amapola is the oldest champion at 36 years old, while Arisa Nakajima is the youngest at 24 years old.

Key
No.	Overall reign number
Reign	Reign number for the specific champion
Days	Number of days held

No.	Champion	Championship change			Reign statistics		Notes	Ref.
No.	Champion	Date	Event	Location	Reign	Days	Notes	Ref.
1	Leon	August 26, 2012	Reina X World 6	Edogawa, Tokyo, Japan	1	47	Defeated Tiffany in the final of a four-woman tournament to become the inaugural champion.	
2	La Amapola	October 12, 2012	CMLL Super Viernes	Mexico City, Mexico	1	44		
3	Leon	November 25, 2012	Reina X World	Edogawa, Tokyo, Japan	2	237		
4	Command Bolshoi	July 20, 2013	JWP Pure-Violence Road.12	Itabashi, Tokyo, Japan	1	8		
5	Arisa Nakajima	July 28, 2013	JWP Pure-Violence Road.13	Nagoya, Aichi, Japan	1	147	This match was also contested for the JWP Openweight Championship.	
—	Vacated	December 22, 2013	—	—	—	—	The championship was vacated for unknown reasons.	
6	Syuri	December 22, 2013	Reina Joshi Puroresu Shin-Kiba 1st Ring Tournament	Koto, Tokyo, Japan	1	119	Defeated La Comandante in a decision match to win the vacant championship.	
7	La Amapola	April 20, 2014	CMLL Domingo Arena México	Mexico City, Mexico	2	339		
8	Maki Narumiya	March 25, 2015	Reina Joshi Puroresu Wrestle Fest in Korakuen	Bunkyō, Tokyo, Japan	1	34		
9	Princesa Sugehit	April 28, 2015	CMLL Martes Arena México	Mexico City, Mexico	1	19		
10	Maki Narumiya	May 17, 2015	Reina Joshi Puroresu Survival Shout in Shin-Kiba	Koto, Tokyo, Japan	2	304		
—	Vacated	March 16, 2016	—	—	—	—	Maki Narumiya vacated the championship ahead of her retirement from professional wrestling.	
11	Heidi Katrina	September 25, 2016	Diamond Stars Wrestling Hataage	Koto, Tokyo, Japan	1	309	Defeated Chica Tormenta to win the vacant championship.	
—	Vacated	July 31, 2017	—	—	—	—	The championship was vacated when Katrina signed with Sendai Girls' Pro Wrestling	
12	Zeuxis	August 13, 2017	CMLL Domingos Familiares	Mexico City, Mexico	1	815	Defeated Marcela in the finals of a tournament to win the vacant championship.	
—	Deactivated	November 6, 2019	—	—	—	—	CMLL ended their working relationship with Reina and the championship was retired.	

== List of combined reigns ==
Rank	Wrestler	No. of reigns	Combined days
1.	Zeuxis	1	815
2.	La Amapola	2	383
3.	Maki Narumiya	2	338
4.	Heidi Katrina	1	309
5.	Leon	2	284
6.	Arisa Nakajima	1	147
7.	Syuri	1	119
8.	Princesa Sugehit	1	19
9.	Command Bolshoi	1	8
