= CMLL World Women's Tag Team Championship =

Women's professional wrestling tag team championship

Details
- Promotion: Consejo Mundial de Lucha Libre
- Date established: September 16, 2023
- Current champions: Lluvia and La Jarochita
- Date won: March 21, 2025
Statistics
- First champions: Stephanie Vaquer and Zeuxis
- Youngest champion: Tessa Blanchard (29 years, 11 days)
- Lightest champion: Stephanie Vaquer (110 pounds (50 kg))

The CMLL World Women's Tag Team Championship (Campeonato Mundial Femeniles de Parejas del CMLL in Spanish) is a women's professional wrestling tag team championship owned by the Mexican lucha libre promotion Consejo Mundial de Lucha Libre (CMLL). The championship was created in 2023 and is one of three women's tag championships currently promoted by CMLL; the other two is the Mexican National Women's Tag Team Championship and the Occidente Women's Tag Team Championship. As it is a professional wrestling championship, it is not won legitimately; it is instead won via a scripted ending to a match or awarded to a wrestler because of a storyline. The championship was first introduced on September 16, 2023, where Stephanie Vaquer and Zeuxis won a match to be crowned the inaugural champions.

== Title history ==
On August 10, 2023, CMLL announced the full card for the CMLL 90th Anniversary Show, which would be held on September 16. On that event, Stephanie Vaquer and Zeuxis defeated the Mexican National Women's Tag Team Champions Las Chicas Indomables (La Jarochita and Lluvia) to be the first title holders in the championship's history.

== Reigns ==
As of October 15, 2026, there have been three reigns, as Stephanie Vaquer and Zeuxis were the inaugural champions. They won the title by defeating Las Chicas Indomables (La Jarochita and Lluvia) at the CMLL 90th Anniversary Show on September 16, 2023, in Mexico City, Mexico.

The current champions are Las Chicas Indomables (La Jarochita and Lluvia), who are in their first reign as a team and technically-second for Lluvia. They won the vacant titles by defeating Taya Valkyrie and Lady Frost in a tournament final on March 21, 2025 at Homenaje a Dos Leyendas in Mexico City, Mexico. Previous champions Lluvia and Tessa Blanchard vacated the titles after Blanchard left the company.

Key
No.	Overall reign number
Reign	Reign number for the specific team—reign numbers for the individuals are in parentheses, if different
Days	Number of days held
+	Current reign is changing daily

No.	Champion	Championship change			Reign statistics		Notes	Ref.
No.	Champion	Date	Event	Location	Reign	Days	Notes	Ref.
Consejo Mundial de Lucha Libre (CMLL)
1	Stephanie Vaquer and Zeuxis	September 16, 2023	CMLL 90th Anniversary Show	Mexico City, Mexico	1	298	Defeated Las Chicas Indomables (La Jarochita and Lluvia) to become the inaugural champions.	
—	Vacated	July 10, 2024	—	—	—	—	The championship was vacated when Stephanie Vaquer signed a contract with WWE.	
2	Lluvia and Tessa Blanchard	August 6, 2024	Martes De Arena Mexico	Mexico City, Mexico	1	129	Defeated Persephone and Zeuxis in a tournament final to win the vacant title.	
—	Vacated	December 13, 2024	—	—	—	—	The championship was vacated when Tessa Blanchard left CMLL to sign with Total Nonstop Action Wrestling.	
3	Las Chicas Indomables (Lluvia and La Jarochita)	March 21, 2025	Homenaje a Dos Leyendas	Mexico City, Mexico	1 (2, 1)	573+	Defeated Taya Valkyrie and Lady Frost in a tournament final to win the vacant title.	
