= Reyna Isis =

Mexican professional wrestler

Personal information
- Born: Yaksiry Palacios López; February 8, 1993 (age 33)

Professional wrestling career
- Ring name: Reyna Isis
- Billed height: 160 cm (5 ft 3 in)
- Billed weight: 64 kg (141 lb)
- Trained by: Arkangel de la Muerte; El Hijo del Gladiador
- Debut: May 12, 2012

Yaksiry Palacios López (born February 8, 1993), better known by her ring name Reyna Isis ("Queen Isis"), is a Mexican professional wrestler who works for Consejo Mundial de Lucha Libre (CMLL), where she is a two-time former Mexican National Women's Champion. She portrays a ruda ("bad guy") wrestling character.

She started her career as a valet for the group Los Guerreros Tuareg, but later transitioned into an in-ring worker. Aside from CMLL, she has also wrestled on the Mexican independent circuit and in Japan. Her ring gear alluded to the original Egyptian Queen Isis with her veil-like mask and she lost her mask to La Jarochita at the CMLL 89th Anniversary Show.

== Championships and accomplishments ==
- Consejo Mundial de Lucha Libre
  - Mexican National Women's Championship (2 times)
  - Grand Prix de Amazonas (2024)
  - Copa Mujeres Revolucionarias (2023)
  - CMLL Bodybuilding Contest (2024 - Wellness Category)
- Pro Wrestling Illustrated
  - Ranked No. 55 of the top 250 women's wrestlers in the PWI Women's 250 in 2023

== Luchas de Apuestas record ==
Winner (wager)	Loser (wager)	Location	Event	Date	Notes
Reyna Isis (mask)	La Vaquerita (hair)	Mexico City	Homenaje a Dos Leyendas	March 18, 2022	
La Jarochita (mask)	Reyna Isis (mask)	Mexico City	CMLL 89th Anniversary Show	September 16, 2022	
