= Lluvia =

Mexican professional wrestler

Personal information
- Born: August 9, 1984 (age 42) Mexico City, Mexico
- Spouse: Último Guerrero
- Parent: Sangre Chicana (father)
- Relatives: Sangre Chicana Jr. (brother); Sangre Imperial (brother); Hijo de Sangre Chicana (brother); Lady Chicana (sister); La Hiedra (sister); Águila Solitaria (uncle); Herodes (uncle); Águila Solitaria Jr. (cousin); Herodes Jr. (cousin); Tabata (daughter)

Professional wrestling career
- Ring name: Lluvia
- Billed height: 1.60 m (5 ft 3 in)
- Billed weight: 60 kg (132 lb)
- Trained by: Sangre Chicana; El Satánico; Último Guerrero
- Debut: April 30, 2008

Lluvia (Spanish for "Rain"; born August 9, 1984, in Mexico City, Mexico) is the ring name of a Mexican professional wrestler working for the Mexican promotion Consejo Mundial de Lucha Libre (CMLL) portraying a tecnico ("Good guy") wrestling character. Lluvia's real name is not a matter of public record, as is often the case with masked wrestlers in Mexico where their private lives are kept a secret from the wrestling fans. Lluvia is a second-generation wrestler, the daughter of Sangre Chicana.

== Personal life ==
Lluvia is the daughter of professional wrestler Andrés Durán Reyes, better known under the ring name Sangre Chicana ("Chicano Blood") and the sister of Sangre Chicana, Jr. unlike her father or her brother Lluvia decided to work as a tecnico while her father was one of the most famous rulebreakers (also known as a rudo) of the 1980s. She is the niece of wrestler Herodes and the cousin of Consejo Mundial de Lucha Libre (CMLL) wrestler Herodes, Jr. She studied psychology at a university before training for her professional wrestling career. She is currently married to Ultimo Guerrero, with whom she had a son n 2017.

== Professional wrestling career ==
Lluvia was originally trained by her father, Sangre Chicana before making her professional wrestling debut on April 30, 2008. She would become a regular for CMLL only a few months later, continuing her wrestling training under CMLL trainers El Satánico and Último Guerrero. CMLL decided to give Lluvia more exposure in the early part of 2009, booking her in an eight-woman torneo cibernetico where all eight women would risk their mask on the outcome of the match, with the last person eliminated would be forced to unmask per the Luchas de Apuestas ("Bet match") rules. In addition to Lluvia the match also included La Magnifica, La Seductora, Estrella Magica, Princesa Sujei, Atenea, Coral, Silueta. The match came down to Lluvia and La Magnifica, with Lluvia winning the match and her first "trophy" the mask of her opponent. On June 14, 2011, Lluvia received her first ever chance to compete for the CMLL World Women's Championship, losing to champion La Amapola two falls to one during a show celebrating the 52nd anniversary of Arena Coliseo. On December 6, 2011, during a CMLL show Lluvia and Luna Mágica defeated La Comandante and Zeuix to win the Reina World Tag Team Championship, a title promoted by Japanese wrestling promotion Universal Woman's Pro Wrestling Reina. The victory meant that the two traveled to Japan to defend the titles in early 2012. On January 29, 2012, Lluvia and Luna Mágica successfully defended the titles against Casandra and La Silueta. Near the end of their tour of Japan, on March 24, the team lost the championship to Zeuxis and Mima Shimoda.

She lost the CMLL Japan Women's Championship to Dark Silueta on July 4.

== Championships and accomplishments ==
- Consejo Mundial de Lucha Libre
  - CMLL World Women's Tag Team Championship (2 times, current) – with Tessa Blanchard (1) and La Jarochita (1, current)
  - Mexican National Women's Tag Team Championship (1 time) – with La Jarochita
  - Occidente Women's Championship (1 time, current)
  - CMLL Japan Women's Championship (1 time)
  - CMLL Universal Amazons Championship (2022)
  - Copa Bobby Bonales 2023
- Pro Wrestling Illustrated
  - Ranked No. 123 of the top 250 female singles wrestlers in the PWI Women's 250 in 2023
- Pro Wrestling Revolution
  - Queen Of Indies (2025)
- Universal Woman's Pro Wrestling Reina

- Reina World Tag Team Championship (1 time) – with Luna Mágica

== Luchas de Apuestas record ==
Winner (wager)	Loser (wager)	Location	Event	Date	Notes
Lluvia (mask)	La Magnifica (mask)	Guadalajara, Jalisco	CMLL Live event	April 3, 2009	(Note: last two competitors in an eight woman torneo cibernetico that also included La Seductora, Estrella Magica, Princesa Sujei, Atenea, Coral, Silueta.)
