= Consejo Mundial de Lucha Libre =

Mexican professional wrestling promotion

Promociones México, Coliseo y Revolución, S.C.
- Trade name: Consejo Mundial de Lucha Libre
- Formerly: Empresa Mexicana de Lucha Libre (1933–1991)
- Type: Private
- Industry: Professional wrestling
- Genre: Lucha libre
- Founded: 1933; 93 years ago
- Founder: Salvador Lutteroth
- Headquarters: Dr. Lavista 189, Doctores, Cuauhtémoc, 06720, Mexico City, Mexico
- Key people: Salvador Lutteroth III (General Manager); José Luis Feliciano (Lead of the Programming Department)
- Owner: Salvador Lutteroth (1933–1960s); Salvador Lutteroth Jr. (1960s–1987); Paco Alonso (1987–2019); Sofía Alonso (2019); Salvador Lutteroth III (2019–present)
- Website: cmll.com

Consejo Mundial de Lucha Libre (CMLL; "World Wrestling Council") is a Mexican professional wrestling promotion based in Mexico City. Founded in 1933 as Empresa Mexicana de Lucha Libre (EMLL; "Mexican Wrestling Enterprise") by Salvador Lutteroth, it is the oldest professional wrestling promotion still in existence.

Prior to 1933, professional wrestling shows in Mexico were primarily promoted by foreign promoters, who typically brought in European or American professional wrestlers as their main attractions. During this period, Salvador Lutteroth, a property inspector for the Mexican tax department in Ciudad Juárez, crossed the U.S. border to attend a wrestling event in El Paso, Texas. Impressed with the event, Lutteroth aimed to create a long-lasting Mexican wrestling promotion built around Mexican wrestlers. In 1933, Lutteroth, along with his financial backer Francisco Ahumada, launched EMLL, the first Mexican-owned wrestling promotion in the country; EMLL held their first show on September 21, 1933. Under Lutteroth's direction, professional wrestling in Mexico developed a distinct style and presentation known as "lucha libre".

The promotion is known as "the serious and stable" for its conservative booking style and is noted for its resistance to the American-originated sports entertainment elements of its chief rival Lucha Libre AAA Worldwide. CMLL, like all other wrestling promotions, does not promote legitimate sporting contests but rather athletic theater performances, featuring storyline-driven, scripted, and partially choreographed matches; however, matches often include moves that put performers at risk of serious injury or death if not performed correctly.

CMLL currently recognizes and promotes 14 world championships in various weight divisions and classifications, nine national level and eight regional/international level championships. The CMLL Anniversary Show series is CMLL's longest-running annual major show, starting in 1934, with the CMLL 92nd Anniversary Show being the most recent. CMLL also regularly promotes major events under the names Homenaje a Dos Leyendas ("Homage to Two Legends"), Sin Piedad ("No Mercy"), Sin Salida ("No Escape"), and Infierno en el Ring ("Inferno in the Ring") during the year. CMLL has promoted their regular weekly Super Viernes ("Super Friday") on a regular basis since the 1930s. Founder Salvador Lutteroth funded the building of Arena Coliseo in 1943, making it the first building in Mexico built specifically for professional wrestling. CMLL's marquee venue, Arena México, was opened in 1956 and has since been dubbed La Catedral de la Lucha Libre.

== History ==
Prior to 1933, professional wrestling shows in Mexico were primarily promoted by foreign promoters doing the occasional match through country or a few scattered local promoters, especially along the U.S. border, who brought in American professional wrestlers as their main attractions.

=== Creation ===
In 1929, Salvador Lutteroth González, who at the time was a property inspector for the Mexican tax department, moved to Ciudad Juárez, near the Mexico–United States border. During a trip to El Paso, Texas, Lutteroth witnessed a professional wrestling show and was intrigued by it, especially the main event, Greek wrestler Gus Pappas. Four years later, Lutteroth, along with his financial backer Francisco Ahumada, chartered Empresa Mexicana de Lucha Libre (EMLL; literally "Mexican Wrestling Enterprise"), the first Mexican-owned wrestling promotion in the country. EMLL held their first show on September 21, 1933, considered the "birth of lucha libre", and which led to Lutteroth being known as "the father of lucha libre".

EMLL initially tried to book Arena Nacional, the premier boxing venue in Mexico City, but the promoters would not let him rent it, forcing Lutteroth and EMLL to take up residence in Arena Modelo, an abandoned and run-down facility that Lutteroth was able to use as his home base. The concept of Lucha Libre quickly became very popular, so much so that the EMLL 1st Anniversary Show drew a sold-out crowd of 5,000 paying fans. In 1934, an American wrestler debuted in Mexico under a black leather mask, and Lutteroth dubbed him La Maravilla Enmascarada or "The Masked Marvel". In the United States the concept of the masked wrestler was more of a mid-level attraction, but the reaction to La Maravilla Enmascarada led to Lutteroth and EMLL officials to introduce more masks, starting with a wrestler known simply as El Enmascarado ("The Masked Wrestler"), and later El Murciélago Enmascarado ("The Masked Bat"). Through the use of the masks and ring characters EMLL helped create the sacred position of the mask in Mexican wrestling, making it the ultimate status symbol for luchadors. In the early days of EMLL, most of the top names were Americans, but with time EMLL introduced several Mexican natives that became so popular that they began to main-event most of the EMLL shows. To expand their business, EMLL began working with a number of local wrestling promoters across Mexico, allowing them to use the EMLL name and some of their contracted wrestlers while also gaining access to local wrestlers in return. Each booking office was independent of each other, but the main office in Mexico City had the final say if there were disputes over who would be able to book certain wrestlers.[

In 1942, a masked wrestler clad in silver, known simply as El Santo ("The Saint"), made his debut. He would go on to become a cultural icon in Mexico and is often cited as the greatest Mexican professional wrestler of all time. With the popularity of El Santo as well as other Mexican stars such as Bobby Bonales, Tarzán López, Cavernario Galindo and Gory Guerrero Arena Modelo eventually became too small to accommodate the demand for tickets. To solve the problem Lutteroth financed the construction of Arena Coliseo in Mexico City, the first arena in Mexico built specifically for professional wrestling and the first sports building in Mexico to have built in air conditioning. The arena, nicknamed the "Lagunilla Funnel" due to its interior shape would hold over 8,800 spectators when configured for Lucha libre or boxing. Arena Coliseo began hosting EMLL's annual Anniversary shows starting with the 10th Anniversary show.

In 1953, Salvador Lutteroth joined the US based National Wrestling Alliance (NWA), becoming the official NWA territory for all of Mexico, known as "NWA-EMLL" outside Mexico. By joining the NWA, Lutteroth and EMLL gained control of the NWA World Light Heavyweight Championship. They were also able to re-brand their "World Middleweight Championship" to become the NWA World Middleweight Championship and their "World Welterweight Championship" became the NWA World Welterweight Championship. In the early 1950s television became as a viable entertainment medium in Mexico which was set to bolster the popularity of EMLL, but Arena Coliseo was not equipped properly for television transmissions. As it turns out luck was on Lutteroth and EMLL's side as Lutteroth and the personnel at Arena Coliseo bought a lottery ticket worth 5 million Pesos. Lutteroth used his portion of the winnings to finance the construction of Arena México, on the location where Arena Modelo used to sit. Arena México enabled EMLL to broadcast their weekly wrestling shows across Mexico, yielding a popularity explosion for the sport. Starting in 1956, with the EMLL 23rd Anniversary Show all anniversary shows were held in Arena México, except the EMLL 46th Anniversary Show. Over time the arena became known as "The Cathedral of Lucha Libre".

Over time, Lutteroth retired from the day-to-day operations of EMLL leaving the company in the hands of his son Salvador "Chavo" Lutteroth Jr.

In 1975, local promoter Francisco Flores, along with EMLL trainer Ray Mendoza broke away from EMLL, citing their displeasure with EMLL's conservative, restrictive promotional style. The two took a number of EMLL's younger wrestlers with them to form Lucha Libre Internacional, S. C, later known as the Universal Wrestling Association (UWA). With the creation of the UWA EMLL faced a rival national promotion for the first time.

=== Becoming CMLL ===
The original logo of Consejo Mundial de Lucha Libre.

In the mid-1980s, Chavo Lutteroth II retired, allowing his nephew Paco Alonso, grandson of Chavo Lutteroth I, to take control of EMLL. In the late 1980s, EMLL decided to leave the NWA, seeking to distance themselves from the political wrestling in the National Wrestling Alliance. At that time, EMLL, with the consent of Paco Alonso, the booker Antonio Peña and the Monterrey promoter Carlos Humberto Elizondo, devised the creation of the Consejo Mundial de Lucha Libre (CMLL; "World Wrestling Council") to establish a new identity after the NWA split, in order to have their own titles and organize promoters who wanted to join, in addition to sounding more international. From 1991 through 1993 CMLL created eight "CMLL World" titles in addition to the three NWA branded titles they retained and a slew of other championships. At the start of the 1990s the company began appearing on the national Televisa network, which led to a second big boom in business due to the renewed national television exposure, in the mid-1970s through the 1980s, magazines and newspapers were the sole medium of Lucha Libre for most Mexicans.

=== AAA split and rivalry ===
In the mid-1980s, retired wrestler Antonio Peña became one of the main bookers for EMLL, helping determine who would win matches, what storylines to use and so on, he was also a driving force behind the name change to Consejo Mundial de Lucha Libre. Peña would often clash with Juan Herrera, the other main booker for CMLL at the time. Herrera wanted to maintain the old style of booking with heavyweights such as Atlantis, El Dandy and El Satánico, while Peña wanted to feature younger, faster moving wrestlers such as Konnan, Octagón or Máscara Sagrada. In the end CMLL owner Paco Alonso decided to go with Juan Herrera's booking style.

After Paco Alonso chose to ignore Peña's booking ideas, Peña began negotiations with Televisa television channel to fund a new wrestling promotion that would provide Televisa with weekly wrestling shows. In 1992 Peña started a booking agency, providing wrestlers and matches for the Televisa owned Asistencia Asesoría y Administración (AAA) promotion. While Peña technically owned the promotion Televisa owns the rights to the AAA name. In a move that mirrored Flores' departure in the 1970s Peña left the promotion alongside a number of young wrestlers who were unhappy with their position in the promotion. With the creation of AAA the promotion replaced the UWA as Mexico's other main wrestling promotion, creating a long running rivalry between CMLL and AAA. Starting in 1996 CMLL began promoting an annual show in March, first paying homage to Salvador Lutteroth, then later Lutteroth and El Santo and then finally becoming the Homenaje a Dos Leyendas ("Homage to Two Legends") annual show series.

=== CMLL in the 21st century ===
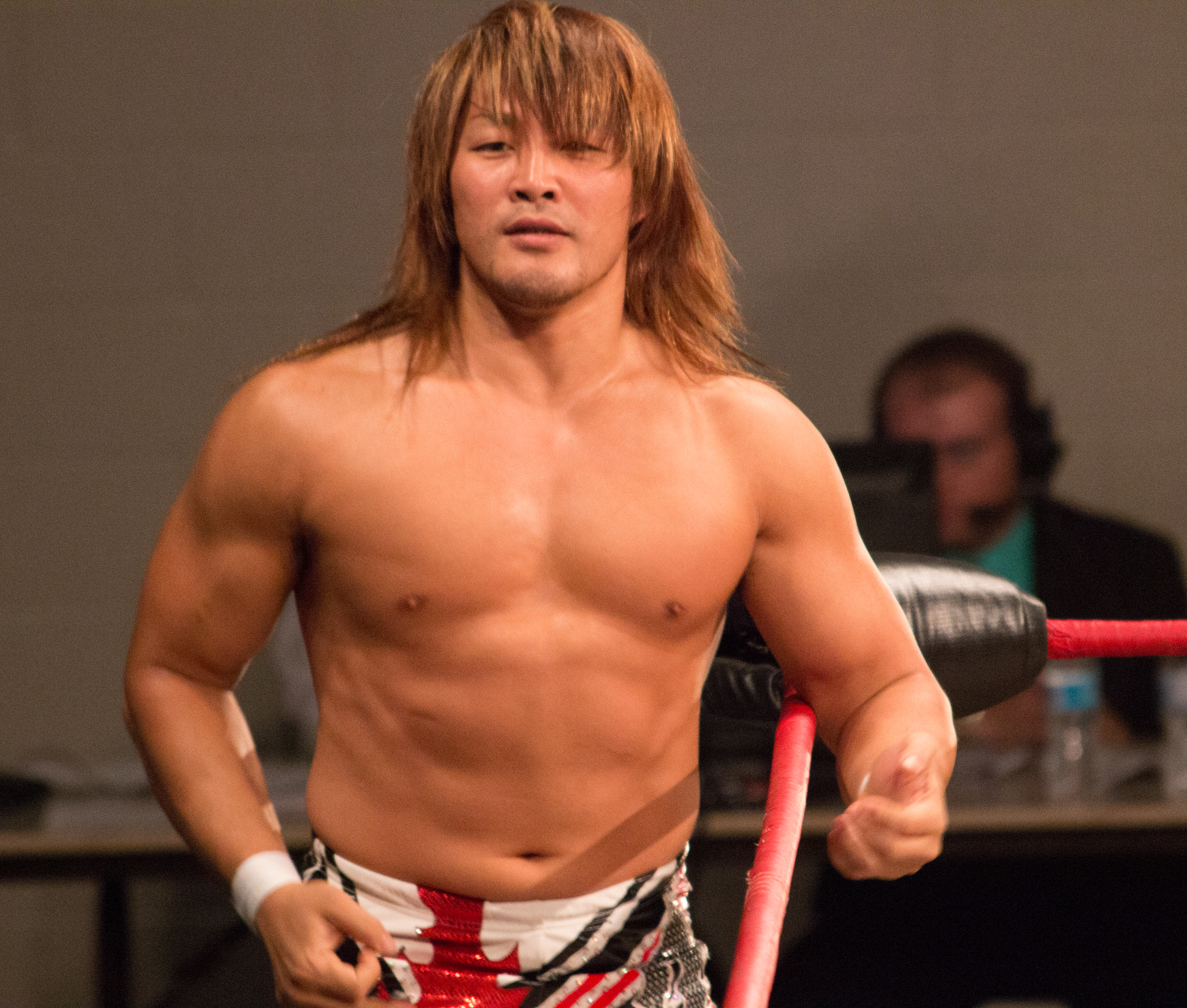
Through their relationship with NJPW, wrestlers such as Hiroshi Tanahashi have toured Mexico.

From 2007 to 2009, CMLL had a working relationship with American promotion Total Nonstop Action Wrestling, which saw CMLL's Averno, Rey Bucanero, Último Guerrero and Volador Jr. winning the 2008 TNA World X Cup and TNA worker Alex Shelley winning the 2008 CMLL International Grand Prix. In 2008, CMLL established a working relationship with New Japan Pro-Wrestling as part of "G-1 World", several wrestlers have since toured between the two companies winning titles, including Místico winning the IWGP Junior Heavyweight Championship and Jushin Thunder Liger winning the CMLL Universal Championship tournament. Since 2011, the two promotions have annually co-promoted events in Japan, under the name Fantastica Mania.

In 2011, CMLL established a working relationship with Japanese women's promotion Universal Woman's Pro Wrestling Reina and announced that the two promotions would create a new championship for women who have been in the professional wrestling industry for less than ten years, called the CMLL-Reina International Junior Championship. This was followed by the establishment of the CMLL-Reina International Championship one year later.

On March 16, 2010, a video was posted on YouTube featuring an interview David Marquez had with NWA Executive Director and Legal Counsel Robert Trobich. Trobich announced that CMLL did not have permission to use the NWA trademark. The rights to usage of the NWA trademark in Mexico is now held by NWA Mexico, represented by Blue Demon, Jr. CMLL replaced the three championships with the NWA World Historic Light Heavyweight Championship, NWA World Historic Middleweight Championship and the NWA World Historic Welterweight Championship.

On September 19, 2014, CMLL became only the second promotion in the Americas, after WWE, to draw a $1 million gate with their 81st Anniversary Show, headlined by a Mask vs. Mask match between Atlantis and Último Guerrero.

On November 6, 2014, the promotion made an alliance with the Mexican independent group Lucha Libre Elite to help bring independent wrestlers into CMLL which ended in early 2018.

On July 6, 2016, NJPW announced that they would broadcast CMLL Friday shows in their video-streaming service, NJPW World. On August 10, CMLL announced a working relationship with American promotion Ring of Honor (ROH). The two promotions were linked through their separate relationships with NJPW. The alliance with ROH ended on April 27, 2021.

On July 7, 2019, CMLL announced the death of the president of the company Paco Alonso (who died a day before, on July 6). On July 10, CMLL appointed Sofía Alonso, Paco's daughter, as the president of the company. On August 26, it was revealed that Sofía had been relieved of her position, with Salvador "Chavo" Lutteroth III becoming the chairman and CEO of PROMECOR-CMLL.

In September 2021, president of Ice Ribbon Hajime Sato appeared alongside Kounosuke Izui, promoter of Lady's Ring, on an episode of CMLL Informa to announce the establishment of a working relationship between the two promotions and the Mexican-based Consejo Mundial de Lucha Libre (CMLL).

On July 5, 2023, CMLL announced an alliance with the Arena Coliseo Tony Arellano de Torreón, who at a press conference announced this merger in which they will work on several projects. Edgar "güero" Noriega, referee and promoter of this company, attended the press conference directly from the CMLL, at which the merger in which the Tony Arellano Arena will be part of the company's programming as it does with the Coliseo de Guadalajara, Puebla, Arena México and Arena Coliseo and now La Laguna is already the headquarters and has been certified.

On August 3, 2023, the CMLL and Revolution Pro Wrestling announced their alliance beginning with their first joint event, Fantastica Mania UK.

On October 13, 2023, All Elite Wrestling announced a working relationship with CMLL.

On September 23, 2025, World Wonder Ring Stardom president Taro Okada appeared alongside Lady's Ring promoter Kounosuke Izui and Consejo Mundial de Lucha Libre (CMLL) president Salvador Lutteroth Lomelí on an episode of CMLL Informa to announce the establishment of a working relationship between World Wonder Ring Stardom promotion and the Mexico-based Consejo Mundial de Lucha Libre (CMLL).

== Style and television ==
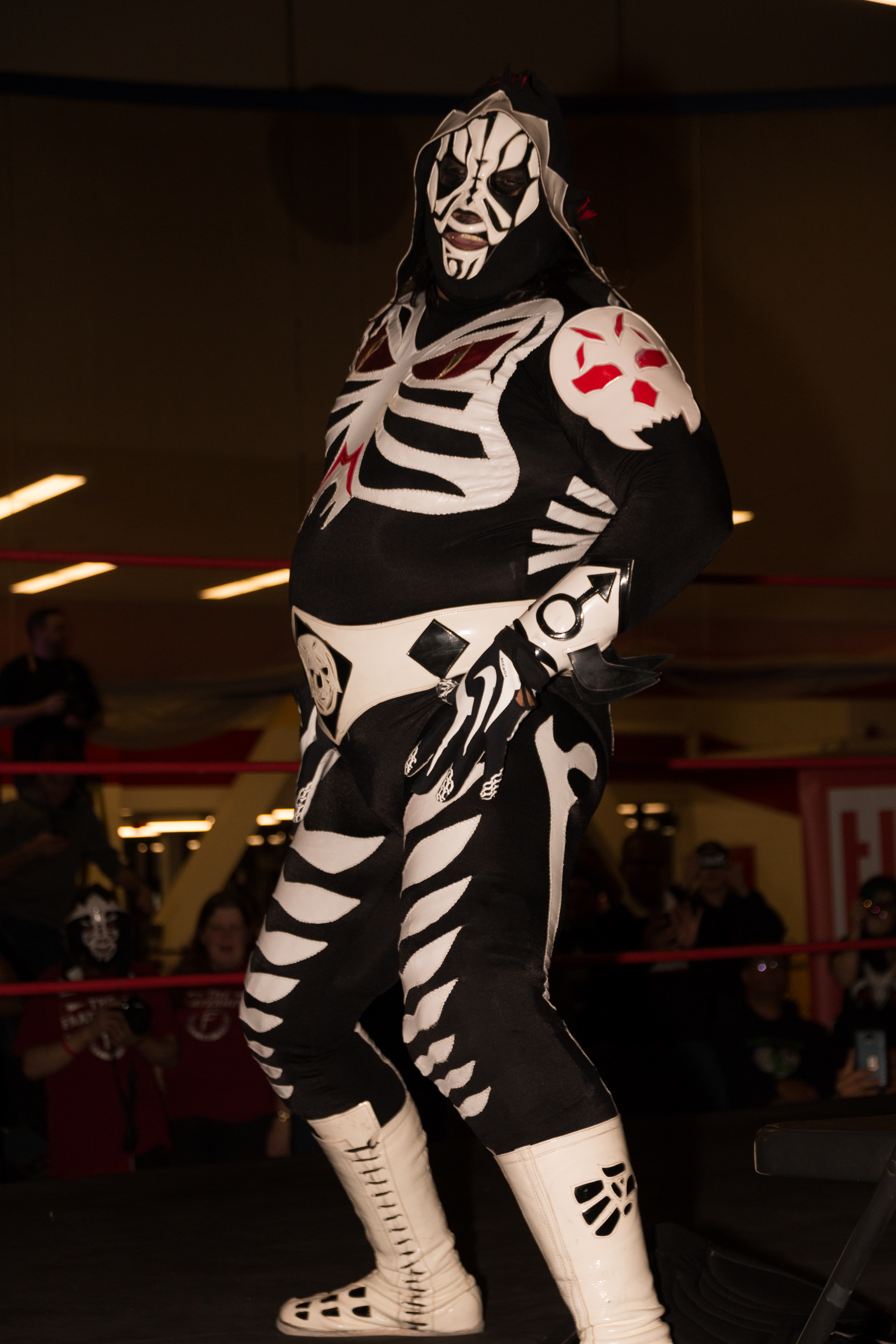
L.A. Park

CMLL regularly runs six shows on five days in a week. The biggest weekly show is the Friday night Super Viernes ("Super Friday") show, held in the famous Arena Mexico in Mexico City. CMLL also runs shows on Saturdays in Arena Coliseo, on Sundays in Arena Mexico, on Mondays in Arena Puebla, and on Tuesdays in Arena Mexico and Arena Coliseo Guadalajara. The Friday and Tuesday shows are also televised.

Of all the major professional wrestling promotions in the world, CMLL is one of the most conservative, having earned the nickname "The serious and the stable" (La Seria y Estable) over time. Matches with blood are not broadcast unless it accidentally happens during a live event. CMLL rarely uses specialty or "gimmick matches" outside a limited number of steel cage matches and the occasional Super Libre, no-disqualification matches. While other promotions have adopted matches such as the ladder match, CMLL remains much more traditional. They also have strict rules for what they will allow to happen during their shows; on one occasion a match between Dr. Wagner Jr. and L. A. Park during the CMLL 75th Anniversary Show degenerated into a brawl on the floor that was so out of control that both wrestlers were fired by CMLL a short time later. CMLL also has strict rules on what wrestlers can and cannot say during their shows, a rule illustrated in 2015 where L.A. Park was fired from the promotion only three weeks after returning due to a profanity-laden rant during a CMLL show.

CMLL's main programming, hosted by Alfonso Morales, Leobardo Magadan and Miguel Linares, is broadcast regularly on Televisa in Mexico, on LATV in the United States, and formerly on Telelatino in Canada and The Wrestling Channel in the United Kingdom. CMLL also had a syndicated show called "Sin Limite de Tiempo" ("with no time limit") which shows matches from Arena Coliseo shows and matches they could not fit onto the regular broadcast. It aired in Los Angeles on KWHY and in San Francisco on KEMO-TV. This show was followed up by "Guerreros del Ring" on Canal 52MX. Also, Spanish-language American sports channel Fox Sports en Español recently started broadcasting CMLL programming. Recently CMLL also added the Mexican network Cadena Tres to its list of networks airing CMLL Wrestling. Galavision began airing CMLL wrestling in the spring of 2011. Galavision shows only a one-hour version while LATV has shown a two-hour version. In 2015, several of CMLL's shows became available live on their YouTube channel and they have held a number of internet-Pay Per Views (PPVs).

== Recurring shows ==
Each year CMLL promotes a number of signature events, some shown as pay-per-view events and others shown on regular television. Over the last couple of years CMLL have held three regular events each year and a number of one off, special events. The Major show, shown in order of when they happen during the year, include:

Event	Created	Next/Most recent event	Notes	Ref(s).
CMLL Anniversary	1934	92nd	The biggest show of CMLL's year, commemorates CMLL's debut in 1933. The longest-running annual show in professional wrestling.	
Arena Coliseo Anniversary	1944	83rd	Commemorating the opening of Arena Coliseo in 1943	
Juicio Final	1955	2019	Originally CMLL's "end of year" show, later held outside of December as well.	
Aniversario de Arena México	1957	70th	Commemorating the opening of Arena México in 1956	
Homenaje a Dos Leyendas	1996	2026	Show held in March, honors two "legends"; one is always Salvador Lutteroth, CMLL's founder.	
Sin Piedad	2000	2020	Either the last show or the first show of the year, depending on the timing.	
Infierno en el Ring	2000	2025	Show headlined by a "multi-person" Steel Cage elimination match, sometimes it gets its own show, in other years it's the main event of another major event.	
Sin Salida	2009	2026	Nondescript show that adopted Sin Piedad's role in the 2020s as the New Year's Day event, and Infierno en el Ring's as the annual multi-man Apuestas Cage match	
Fantastica Mania	2011	2026	Shows co-produced with New Japan Pro-Wrestling, held in Japan in January each year.	
Día de Muertos	2014	2025	Series of shows held to celebrate the Mexican Day of the Dead holiday.	
Leyendas Mexicanas	2016	2019	Celebrates the history of lucha libre and includes CMLL inviting various "legends" to return to CMLL for a one-night show.	

== Current championships ==
=== World champions ===
As of November 18, 2026

=== Men's division ===
Singles

Championship	Current champion(s)	Reign	Date won	Days held	Location	Notes	Ref.
CMLL World Heavyweight Championship	Hechicero	2	March 20, 2026	243+	Mexico City, D.F.	Defeated Claudio Castagnoli.	
CMLL World Light Heavyweight Championship	Místico	1	September 19, 2025	425	Mexico City, D.F.	Defeated Maxwell Jacob Friedman at CMLL's 92nd Anniversary Show.	
CMLL World Middleweight Championship	Templario	1	May 12, 2023	1,286	Mexico City, D.F.	Defeated Dragon Rojo Jr. at Viernes Espectacular.	
CMLL World Welterweight Championship	Titán	1	December 8, 2019	2537	Mexico City, D.F.	Defeated El Soberano at CMLL Domingos Arena Mexico.	
CMLL World Lightweight Championship	Stigma	1	March 15, 2022	1709	Mexico City, D.F.	Defeated Suicida at Martes Populares in a tournament final to win the vacant title. Previous champion Kawato-San was stripped of the title due to suffering a knee injury.	
CMLL World Mini-Estrellas Championship	Pequeño Volador Jr.	1	September 26, 2025	418	Mexico City, D.F.	Defeated Último Dragoncito at Super Viernes to win the title.	
CMLL World Micro-Estrellas Championship	KeMalito	1	September 26, 2025	418	Mexico City, D.F.	Defeated Tengu at Super Viernes to win the title.	
NWA World Historic Light Heavyweight Championship	Averno	1	February 26, 2026	265	Tokyo, Japan	Defeated Atlantis Jr. at Fantastica Mania: Night 6 to win the title.	
NWA World Historic Middleweight Championship	Volador Jr.	2	July 3, 2026	138	Mexico City, D.F.	Defeated Flip Gordon to win the title at Super Viernes.	
NWA World Historic Welterweight Championship	Máscara Dorada	1	December 16, 2023	1068	Mexico City, D.F.	Defeated Rocky Romero at Super Viernes Espectacular	

==== Tag team ====
Championship	Current champion(s)	Reign	Date won	Days held	Location	Notes	Ref.
CMLL World Tag Team Championship	Los Hermanos Chavez (Ángel de Oro and Niebla Roja)	1	January 23, 2022	1,760	Mexico City, D.F.	Defeated Titán and Volador Jr. at Domingos Arena Mexico.	
CMLL World Trios Championship	El Sky Team (Máscara Dorada, Místico and Neón)	1 (2, 1, 2)	May 16, 2025	551	Mexico City, D.F.	Defeated Los Infernales (Euforia, Averno and Mephisto) at Viernes Espectacular.	

=== Women's division ===
Singles

Championship	Current champion(s)	Reign	Date won	Days	Location	Notes	Ref.
CMLL World Women's Championship	Persephone	1	March 6, 2026	257	Mexico City, D.F.	Defeated Mercedes Moné at La Noche de la Amazonas.	
CMLL Japan Women's Championship	India Sioux	1	March 15, 2026	248	Tokyo, Japan	Defeated Hazuki at Stardom Cinderella Tournament 2026.	

==== Tag team ====
Championship	Current champion(s)	Reign	Date won	Days	Location	Notes	Ref.
CMLL World Women's Tag Team Championship	Lluvia and La Jarochita	1	March 21, 2025	607	Mexico City, D.F.	Defeated Taya Valkyrie and Lady Frost in a tournament final at Homenaje a Dos Leyendas to win the vacant titles. Previous champions Tessa Blanchard and Lluvia vacated the titles after Blanchard left the company.	

=== National championships ===
Championship	Current Champion(s)	Held since	Reigns	Days held	Location	Notes	Ref.
Mexican National Heavyweight Championship	Esfinge	October 27, 2026	1	22+	Mexico City, Mexico	Defeated Akuma on CMLL Martes Populares.	
Mexican National Light Heavyweight Championship	Vegas Depredador	September 25, 2026	1	54+	Mexico City, Mexico	Defeated Esfinge at Noche de Campeones.	
Mexican National Middleweight Championship	Rey Pegasus	September 25, 2026	1	54+	Mexico City, Mexico	Defeated Guerrero Maya Jr. at Noche de Campeones.	
Mexican National Welterweight Championship	Capitán Suicida	March 31, 2026	1	232+	Mexico City, Mexico	Defeated Magia Blanca on Martes Populares.	
Mexican National Lightweight Championship	Calavera Jr. I	March 23, 2026	1	240+	Puebla, Puebla	Defeated Rayo Metálico on Lunes Clasico.	
Mexican National Tag Team Championship	Los Depredadores (Rugido and Magnus)	July 9, 2023	1	1,228+	Mexico City, Mexico	Defeated La Fuerza Tapatia (Esfinge and Fugaz) on Domingo Familiar.	
Mexican National Trios Championship	Los Herederos (Felino Jr., Hijo de Stuka Jr., and El Cobarde)	June 16, 2025	1	520+	Puebla, Puebla	Defeated Los Viajeros del Espacio (Futuro, Hombre Bala Jr., and Max Star) on Lunes Clasico.	
Mexican National Women's Championship	Thunder Rosa	July 31, 2026	1	110+	Mexico City, Mexico	Defeated India Sioux on Viernes Espectacular.	
Mexican National Women's Tag Team Championship	Las Valientitas (Olympia and Hera)	September 25, 2026	1	54+	Mexico City, Mexico	Defeated Kira and Skadi at Noche de Campeones.	

=== Regional championships ===
Championship	Current Champion(s)	Held since	Reigns	Days held	Location	Notes	Ref.
CMLL Arena Coliseo Tag Team Championship	Los Hermanos Calavera (Calavera Jr. I and Calavera Jr. II)	April 4, 2026	1	228+	Mexico City, Mexico	Defeated Los Villanos (El Hijo del Villano III and Villano III Jr.) at CMLL 83. Aniversario Arena Coliseo.	
CMLL Arena Puebla Tag Team Championship	Meyer and Tiger Boy	July 13, 2026	1	128+	Zaragoza, Puebla	Defeated Rey Espartano and Konjuro in a tournament final on Lunes Clásico to become the inaugural champions.	
CMLL Arena Puebla Openweight Championship	Prayer	July 27, 2026	1	114+	Zaragoza, Puebla	Defeated Meyer, Centella Roja, Millenium, Tiger Boy, Astro, Konjuro, Rey Espartano, Hijo del Perverso, and Malayo in a torneo on Lunes Clásico to become the inaugural champion.	
Occidente Heavyweight Championship	Bestia Negra	March 1, 2022	1	1,723+	Guadalajara, Jalisco	Defeated Exterminador 2–1 in a two-out-of-three falls match on Martes de Glamour.	
Occidente Middleweight Championship	Zandokan Jr.	February 22, 2022	1	1,730+	Guadalajara, Jalisco	Defeated Principe Daniel 2–1 in a two-out-of-three falls match on Martes de Glamour.	
Occidente Tag Team Championship	Ráfaga Jr. and Gallo Jr.	November 4, 2025	1	379+	Guadalajara, Jalisco	Defeated Black Warrior Jr. and Prince Drago in a tournament final on Martes de Glamour.	
Occidente Trios Championship	Ráfaga, Guerrero de la Muerte, and Furia Roja	May 20, 2025	1	547+	Guadalajara, Jalisco	Defeated Difunto, Crixus, and Raider 2–1 in a two-out-of-three falls match on Martes de Glamour.	
Occidente Women's Championship	Lluvia	April 23, 2024	1	939+	Guadalajara, Jalisco	Defeated Dark Silueta on Martes de Glamour.	
Occidente Women's Tag Team Championship	Las Infernales (Dark Silueta and Zeuxis)	January 7, 2025	1	680+	Guadalajara, Jalisco	Defeated Las Chicas Indomables (Lluvia and La Jarochita) on Martes de Glamour to win the vacant title. Previous champions Adira and Naútica vacated the title after Adira left CMLL.	

== Defunct championships ==
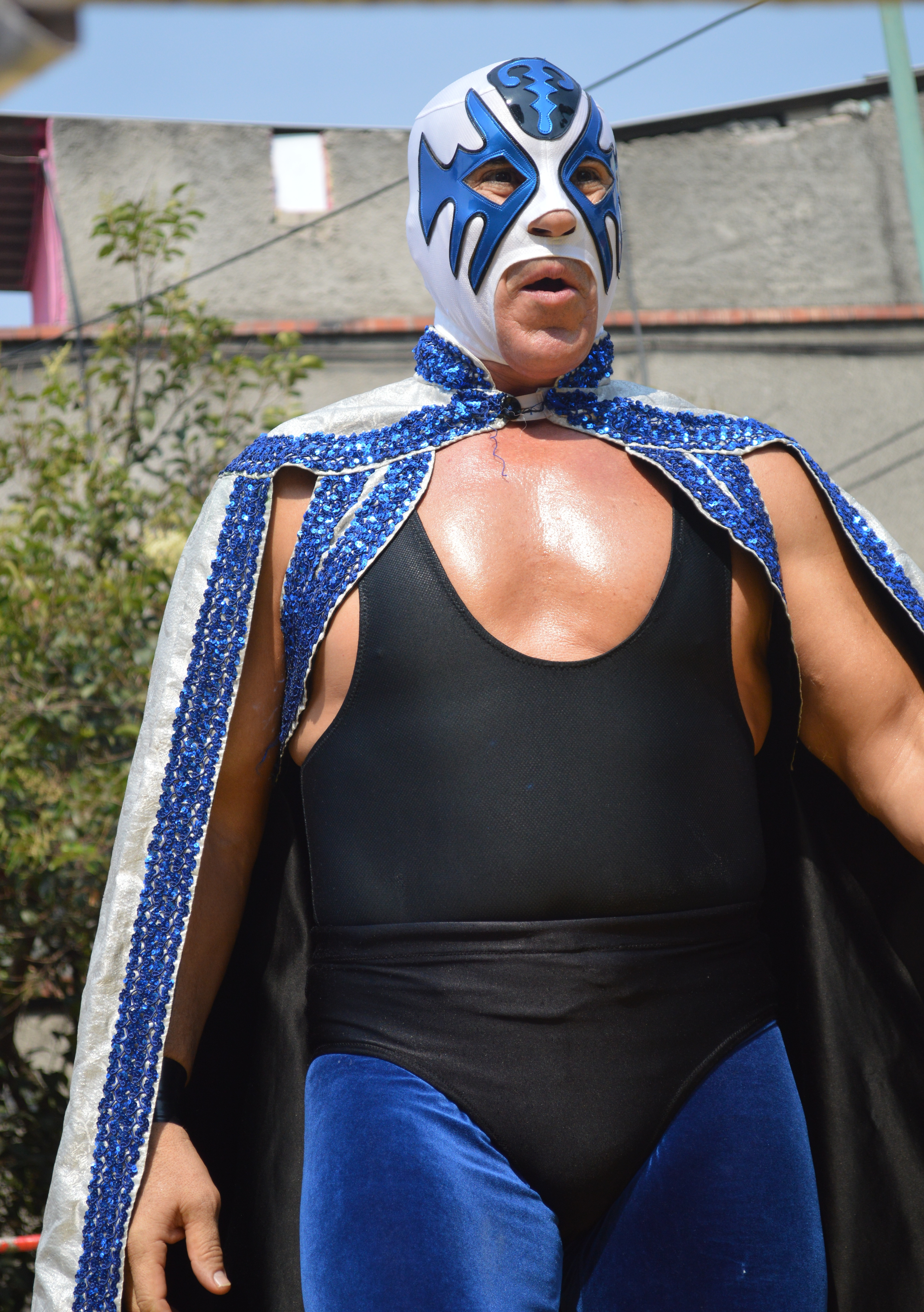
Atlantis, the former Mexican National Light Heavyweight Champion.

Championship	Last champion(s)	Reign	Date retired	Notes
CMLL-Reina International Junior Championship	Kaho Kobayashi	September 15, 2017	November 6, 2019	
CMLL-Reina International Championship	Zeuxis	August 13, 2017	November 6, 2019	
CMLL Costa Rica National Championship	Kaiser	October 15, 2016	December 18, 2016	
CMLL Japan Super Lightweight Championship	Ricky Marvin	February 27, 1999	August 6, 2000	
CMLL Japan Tag Team Championship	Masato Yakushiji and Naohiro Hoshikawa	February 24, 1999	July 7, 1999	
LLA Azteca Championship	Místico	December 19, 2009	May 12, 2013	
Mexican National Mini-Estrella Championship	Mascarita Dorada	February 8, 1993	November 5, 2004	
NWA Intercontinental Heavyweight Championship	El Faraón	October 1990	November 1990	
NWA World Light Heavyweight Championship	El Texano Jr.	November 6, 1952	August 12, 2012	
NWA World Middleweight Championship	Averno	1939	August 12, 2012	
NWA World Welterweight Championship	Mephisto	March 15, 1946	August 12, 2012	
Occidente Lightweight Championship	Pluma Negra	1985	2006	
Occidente Welterweight Championship	Explosivo	1946	2020	
Occidente Light Heavyweight Championship	Esfinge	1954	2020	
IWC World Heavyweight Championship	Máscara Año 2000	September 1995	July 1996	

== Tournaments ==
CMLL conducts several annual tournaments which usually signify a big push. Tournaments have been left out of the schedule for unexplained reasons. Some tournaments are conducted as torneo ciberneticos, a large multi-man tag team elimination match, others are normal single elimination tournament.

=== Active tournaments ===
Tournament	Last winner	Last held	Notes
Campeonato Universal; (Universal Champion)	Máscara Dorada	April 24, 2026	An elimination tournament consisting of all champions to determine the "Universal champion". Winner receives a title belt but it is defended in the annual tournament.
Campeonato Universal De Amazonas; (Universal Women's Champion)	Olympia	October 16, 2026	A tournament consisting of torneo cibernetico qualifiers and a singles final, consisting of the top luchadoras in the company to determine the "Universal Women's champion". Winner receives a title belt until the next tournament, and a "international match" of their choice the following year.
International Gran Prix	Hechicero	August 7, 2026	Previously an elimination tournament, now a torneo cibernetico. Features a "Mexico vs. International" wrestlers theme with one side predominantly being native Mexicans and the other side of the Cibernetico predominantly being foreigners.
International Gran Prix De Amazonas	Skadi	September 23, 2026	A torneo cibernetico featuring a "Mexico vs. International" wrestlers theme with one side predominantly being native Mexicans and the other side of the Cibernetico predominantly being foreigners.
Leyenda de Plata; ("Silver Legend")	Máscara Dorada	July 31, 2026	A tournament in honor of El Santo. This has been the most prestigious of the CMLL tournaments, traditionally made up of the best in-ring workers. In the 2020s it skewed specifically towards showcasing lighter weight-class luchadors.
Leyenda de Azul; ("Blue Legend")	Bárbaro Cavernario	November 28, 2025	A tournament in honor of Blue Demon. It is secondary to the Leyenda de Plata tournament but traditionally features most of the top wrestlers in the promotion, with the 2020s skewing specifically towards heavyweights. It has been conducted as a normal torneo cibernético and as a one night tournament.
Reyes del Aire; ("Kings of the Air")	Flip Gordon	February 3, 2026	This tournament is for high flyers. The tournament usually works as a cibernetico with mostly young and undercard tecnicos, with the idea of focusing more attention on the winner.
Torneo Gran Alternativa; ("Great Alternative" Tournament)	Atlantis Jr. and Xelhua	December 19, 2025	An elimination tag team tournament where an established star teams with a young midcarder with the intent to give the younger wrestler more credibility.
Torneo Nacional de Parejas Increíbles; ("National Incredible Pairs" Tournament)	Máscara Dorada and Rocky Romero	March 29, 2024	An elimination tag team tournament where a rudo (bad guy) and a tecnico (good guy) team up.
La Copa Junior; ("The Junior Cup")	Villano III Jr.	May 29, 2026	This tournament features wrestlers who are at least second-generation wrestlers, though worked family relations have been accepted as well.
Rey del Inframundo; ("King of the Underworld")	Xelhua	October 30, 2026	A tournament taking place during Día de Muertos week, to crown El Rey del Inframundo. Winner received a title belt that is exclusively defended in the annual tournament final.
Copa Dinastías; ("Dynasty's Cup")	El Hijo del Villano III and Villano III Jr.	June 21, 2026	A tag or trios tournament that emphasises the familial aspect of lucha libre. Members of a team are related to one another.
Copa Independencia; ("Independence Cup")	Tessa Blanchard	September 16, 2026	A tournament to celebrate Mexico's Independence Day, typically culminating at the annual Anniversary show.
Fantastica Mania Tag Team Tournament	Mistico and Máscara Dorada	February 24, 2026	A tag tournament held during CMLL's annual Japan tour at the start of the year, co-promoted by NJPW. Has gone through several themes, including familial connections & faction supremacy.
Copa Irma González; ("Irma González Cup")	La Magnífica	March 6, 2026	A cibernetico in honor of pioneering luchadora Irma González, held on or near International Women's Day.

=== Minor tournaments ===
These tournaments are all relatively new (none established earlier than 2023), and skew towards favouring younger and/or lower-card talent.

Tournament	Last winner	Last held	Notes
Torneo de Escuelas; ("Schools' Tournament")	Magia Blanca's Team CDMX (Tornado & Rey Pegasus)	February 27, 2026	A tournament spread over multiple nights that pits the students of CMLL's various regional wrestling schools (typically Mexico City, Jalisco, Puebla & La Laguna) against each other. Format might vary year-to-year, with 2025 expanding from four teams to six, and 2026 focusing instead on pairings who shared an individual trainer.
Campeonato Embajador de los Ninos; ("Children's Ambassador Championship")	Fuego	April 26, 2026	A one night cibernetico tournament held at the annual Children's Day show in April. Participants are decided by young fans via digital voting.
Torneo Cinco de Mayo; ("May 5th Tournament")	Esfinge	May 4, 2026	A one night cibernetico tournament held at the Monday Puebla show closest to May 5th, in commemoration of the Battle of Puebla.
Campeonato Barroco de la Arena Puebla; ("Arena Puebla Barroco Championship")	Rey Apocalipsis	July 20, 2026	A multi-week tournament that culminates at the annual Arena Puebla Anniversary show, predominantly featuring wrestlers from the Puebla region.
Copa Tzompantli; ("Skull-Rack Cup")	Persephone	November 1, 2026	An elimination match held on the Sunday "Tzompantli de Mascaras" event during CMLL's Día de Muertos week, exclusively featuring wrestlers who had previously lost or relinquished their masks. Alternates between male & female competitors.
Copa Mujeres Revolucionarias; ("Revolutionary Women Cup")	Princesa Sugehit	November 16, 2026	Women's cibernetico to celebrate Mexican Revolution Day, held in Arena Puebla.

=== Past annual tournaments ===
These are all the tournament that have been held in the past by Consejo Mundial de Lucha Libre but have not been promoted in the last two years.

Tournament	Last winner	Last held	Notes
Copa de Arena Mexico	Team Tall (Black Warrior, Lizmark, Jr., and Rayo de Jalisco, Jr.)	July 5, 2002	A one night tournament for trios teams. The winners earns a trophy; each team comes up with a name for their trio. The tournament was only held in 1999, 2001, and 2002. In 1999, the winners were El Satánico, Rey Bucanero and Último Guerrero as "Team Guerreros del Infierno". The 2001 winners were Black Warrior, Shocker, and Apolo Dantes as "Team Shocker".
La Copa Diablo Velazco	Ángel de Oro	November 23, 2008	A torneo cibernetico to honor legendary trainer Diablo Velazco.
Forjando un Ídolo ("Forging an Idol")	Ángel de Oro	May 27, 2011	A 16-man tournament with the purpose of identifying which of the "Rookies" in the tournament would move up the ranks of the promotion.
Copa Herdez	Lady Apache	July 30, 2011	A match to commemorate CMLL's sponsorship by food company Herdez, held in July. Ran for 3 years, with mini-estrellas, luchador tag teams, and luchadoras respectively.
Torneo Sangre Nueva ("New Blood Tournament")	Soberano Jr.	March 11, 2013	Tournament for the younger and lower ranked wrestlers in CMLL.
Torneo Increibles de Parejas, Arena Puebla	Atlantis and Volador Jr.	April 1, 2013	An elimination tag team tournament where arudo (bad guy) and a tecnico (good guy) team up.
Pequeños Reyes del Aire; ("Miniature Kings of the Air")	Shockercito	January 6, 2015	Like the Reyes del Aire but for Mini-Estrellas
En Busca de un Ídolo; ("In Search of an Idol")	Boby Zavala	August 21, 2015	An eight-man tournament with the purpose of identifying which of the "Rookies" in the tournament would move up the ranks of the promotion.
Copa Nuevos Valores; ("New Values Cup")	Magia Blanca	April 18, 2018	A 16-man tournament for CMLL rookies.

== Broadcasters ==
Domestic:

- TUDN (2020–present)
- Ticketmaster Live
- Televisión Mexiquense
- MVS TV
- 52MX
- Nu9ve
- Megacable
- Nuestra Visión
- VideosOficialesCMLL
- Claro Sports
- Multimedios Televisión
- TVC Deportes
- Marca
- El Heraldo TV
- Imagen Televisión
- Fox Deportes Mexico
- Televisa Guadalajara
- Terra
- TeleFórmula

International (current):

- LATV
- Nuestra Visión
- Multimedios Televisión
- Galavisión
- KWHY-TV
- TV Asahi
- Fighting TV Samurai
- NJPW World
- Fight Network
- Fight Network USA
- Fight Network Turkey
- Fight Network International
- VideosOficialesCMLL
- CMLL On Twitch

Worldwide:

- NJPW World
- VideosOficialesCMLL
- CMLL On Twitch

International (former):

- Azteca América
- FITE TV
- The Fight Network
- Telelatino
- Fox Deportes USA
- KEMO-TV
- Honor Club

== See also ==
- Professional wrestling in Mexico
- List of professional wrestling promotions in Mexico
