= La Jarochita =

Mexican professional wrestler

Personal information
- Born: Unrevealed (Note: Traditionally Mexican sources will not report on the birth name of a masked wrestler who has never been unmasked in the ring.); May 13, 1988 (age 38) Veracruz, Veracruz, Mexico
- Parent: El Imperial (father)

Professional wrestling career
- Ring name: La Jarochita
- Billed height: 1.62 m (5 ft 4 in)
- Billed weight: 63 kg (139 lb)
- Trained by: El Imperial; Gran Apache; Villano IV; Shocker; Último Guerrero

La Jarochita (Spanish for "The Girl from Veracruz" or "The Little Woman from Veracruz") is the ring name of a Mexican professional wrestler. She works for Consejo Mundial de Lucha Libre (CMLL) where she works as a técnica (fan-favorite character, or Face). She previously worked for Lucha Libre AAA Wrestling where she won the 2012 Quién Pinta Para La Corona ("Who is looking for the crown") talent search. Her legal name is not a matter of public record, as is often the case with masked wrestlers in Mexico where their private lives are out of the public eye.

== Championships and accomplishments ==
- Consejo Mundial de Lucha Libre

- 2021 CMLL Universal Amazons Championship Winner
- Mexican National Women's Tag Team Championship (1 time) - with Lluvia
- CMLL World Women's Tag Team Championship (1 time) - with Lluvia

- Lucha Libre AAA Worldwide
  - Quién Pinta Para La Corona (2012, Women's division)
- Pro Wrestling Illustrated
  - Ranked No. 112 of the top 250 women's wrestlers in the PWI Women's 250 in 2023

== Luchas de Apuestas record ==
| Winner (wager) | Loser (wager) | Location | Event | Date | Notes |
|---|---|---|---|---|---|
| La Jarochita (mask) | Reyna Isis (mask) | Mexico City | CMLL 89th Anniversary Show | September 16, 2022 | |
