= List of Consejo Mundial de Lucha Libre tournaments =

List of professional wrestling tournaments held by CMLL

The Mexican professional wrestling promotion Consejo Mundial de Lucha Libre (CMLL; Spanish for "World Wrestling Council") has held a variety of different professional wrestling tournaments since it was founded in 1933. CMLL holds several annually recurring tournaments as well as tournaments to either determine who should hold a championship or who should challenge for a championship. CMLL has also held some uniquely lucha libre tournaments, such as a "Losers Advance" Ruleta de la Muerte ("Roulette of death") tournament when the loser of the final match would be forced to either unmask or have his or her hair shaved off. As professional wrestling tournaments, they are not won and lost legitimately; they are instead won via a predefined outcome of matches.

== Tournament chronology ==
Note: only tournaments with known winners in the records are counted. Unless the tournament's stipulation is of historic significance.

=== Miscellaneous Tournaments ===
Prior to the 1990s, CMLL (EMLL at the time) regularly held tournaments - usually tag team-based, typically of the standard 8-participant single elimination format (Note: variations will be noted) - with no clear name, gimmick or prize, presumably as a matter of spontaneous promotional flare. These include:

In 1955:

- August 21, (singles), won by Blue Demon
- September 25, won by Blue Demon & Halcón Negro

In 1956:

- January 6 (singles), won by Cavernario Galindo
- March 2, won by Halcón Negro
- July 22, won by Rolando Vera & Tarzán López
- October 21–28, won by El Gladiador & El Mongol
- November 17 (Arena Puebla), won by Masahiko Kimura & Teizo Watanabe

In 1957:

- June 1 (Arena Puebla), won by Enrique Llanes & Tarzán López
- November 9, 1957 (Arena Puebla), won by El Enfermero & Rene Guajardo
- November 20 (singles), won by Moloch
- December 10, won by Moloch & Huroki Sito
- December 25, won by Halcón Negro & Henry Pilusso

In 1959:

- May 22, won by Karloff Lagarde & Ray Mendoza

In 1963:

- January 4 (Arena Coliseo Guadalajara - unknown format), won by Javier Escobedo & Oso Negro
- February 10, won by El Enfermero & Fantasma de la Quebrada

In 1964:

- March 28, won by Blue Demon & El Santo
- May 8, won by Dorrel Dixon & Huracán Ramírez
- June 21, won by Apolo Curiel & Humberto Garza
- July 3, won by Dory Dixon & Relámpago Cubano
- August 28, won by Henry Pilusso & La Bestia

In 1965:

- February 2, won by Dick Angelo & Fantasma de la Quebrada
- February 12, won by Alfonso Dantes & Rubén Juárez
- April 2, won by Dorrel Dixon & Ham Lee
- May 25, won by Cavernario Galindo & Ray Mendoza
- June 18, won by Humberto Garza & Rubén Juárez
- July 17, won by Black Shadow & Mil Máscaras
- July 20 (unknown format), won by Cesar Valentino & Mishima Ota
- August 27, won by Mil Máscaras & Rayo de Jalisco
- August 31, which went to a draw
- October 5, won by Espartano & Mao Chang
- October 8, won by Alberto Muñoz & Felipe Ham Lee
- December 10, won by Black Shadow & Mil Máscaras

In 1966:

- January 16, won by Felipe Ham Lee & Tony Reyna
- January 18, won by El Rebelde & Mao Chang
- February 6, won by Apolo Curiel & Humberto Garza
- February 20, won by Antonio Montoro & Antonio Posa
- March 4, won by Benny Gallant & Ray Mendoza
- March 29, won by Rolando Costa & Tony Reyna
- April 1, won by Dr. Wagner & Espanto I
- June 28, won by Estrella Blanca & Mao Chang
- July 10 (singles), won by Daniel Curiel
- August 19, won by El Santo & Rayo de Jalisco
- August 21, won by Alfonso Dantes & Mao Chang
- August 23, won by Ángel Negro & Saúl Montes
- September 9, won by Black Shadow & Mil Máscaras
- December 2, won by Ángel Blanco & Dr. Wagner

In 1972:

- February 25, won by Anibal & David Morgan
- April 28, won by Alberto Muñoz & Rayo de Jalisco
- July 7, won by Ray Mendoza & Tony López
- August 4 (4-team format), won by Huracán Ramírez & Ray Mendoza
- August 15 (4-team format), won by El Polaco & Pepe Casas
- August 15 (4-team format), won by Escorpión I & Escorpión II
- October 3, won by Villano I & Villano II
- October 24, won by Leo López & Pepe Casas
- December 22 (singles), won by Enrique Vera
- December 24, won by Fishman & Karloff Lagarde

In 1973:

- January 19 (4-team format), won by Ciclón Veloz & El Solitario
- February 6, won by Estrella Blanca & Huracán Ramírez
- February 20, won by Rizado Ruiz & Rodolfo Ruiz
- February 23 (4-team format), won by José Escobedo & Martin Escobedo
- February 23 (4-team format), won by Karloff Lagarde & Rene Guajardo
- March 23, won by Alberto Muñoz & Ray Mendoza
- April 10, which went to a double count-out
- May 4, won by Hayashi & Yamamoto
- June 8, won by El Solitario & Ray Mendoza
- July 3, won by José Luis Mendieta & Ringo Mendoza
- July 6, won by El Halcón & Enrique Vera
- July 31, won by Carlos Mata & Rubén Pato Soria
- October 16, won by Villano I & Villano II
- November 9 (4-team format), won by Mano Negra & El Rostro
- November 9 (4-team format), won by Kim Chul Won & Kim Sung Ho
- December 18, won by Bruno Victoria & El Rebelde

=== 1933-1989 ===
Date(s)	Tournament	Format	Winner(s)	Ref.
??.??.????-February 6, 1938	Mexican National Middleweight Championship Tournament	???	Octavio Gaona	
March 1, 1946-March 15, 1946	NWA World Welterweight Championship tournament	8-man single elimination	El Santo	
June 13, 1952	NWA World Middleweight Championship Tournament	???	Tarzán López	
June 29, 1952	mask vs maskless tournament	8-man single elimination	Chico Casasola	
August 29, 1952 (or September 12, 1952)	Copa (Note: for a cash prize of $1,000-10,000 pesos)	8-man single elimination	Henry Pilusso	
September 5, 1952-September 26, 1952	Arena Coliseo Tag Team Championship tournament	4-team single elimination	Henry Pilusso and Tarzán López	
November 20, 1952	Mexican National Tag Team (Note: the tournament was advertised as for a cash prize & a pair of tag team championship belts, the latter of which was later rescinded by the Comisión de Box y Lucha) Tournament	8-team single elimination	Médico Asesino and El Enfermero	
November 14, 1952	Trofeo XHTV	8-man single elimination	Black Shadow	
June 25, 1955-July 9, 1955	NWA World Middleweight Championship #1 contendership tournament	8-man single elimination	Black Shadow	
November 19, 1955	Copa	8-team single elimination	Dorrel Dixon & El Gladiador	
July 15, 1955	tag team tournament	8-team single elimination	Carlos Moreno and Joe Marín	
July 24, 1955	rookie/veteran tournament	8-team single elimination	Apolo Sureño and Cavernario Galindo	
September 2, 1955-September 16, 1955	NWA World Middleweight Championship #1 contendership tournament	8-man single elimination	Black Shadow	
May 5, 1956	Copa	8-team single elimination	Dorrel Dixon & Joe Grant	
August 3, 1956-October 5, 1956	Mexican National Welterweight Championship tournament	8-man single elimination	Jalisco González	
August 5, 1956-September 7, 1956	Mexican National Heavyweight Championship tournament	8-man single elimination	Médico Asesino	
August 19, 1956	Copa	8-team single elimination	Black Killer & Gladiador	
August 24, 1956-September 14, 1956	Mexican National Middleweight Championship tournament	8-man single elimination	El Santo	
August 26, 1956-September 7, 1956	Mexican National Light Heavyweight Championship tournament	8-man single elimination	Tarzán López	
September 16, 1956	Copa	8-team single elimination	Dorrel Dixon & Joe Grant	
September 28, 1956	Copa (Note: originally billed as an NWA World Middleweight Championship #1 contenders tournament)	8-team single elimination	Black Shadow	
November 18, 1956-November 25, 1956	Copa	8-man single elimination	Blue Demon & Henry Pilusso	
December 25, 1956-January 1, 1957	Copa día festivo	8-man single elimination	Black Shadow & Dory Dixon	
May 17, 1957-June 14, 1957	Mexican National Tag Team Championship (Note: alternatively reported as for the Arena Coliseo Tag Team Championship, or what would later be christened the EMLL Arena México Tag Team Championship) tournament	8-team single elimination	Blue Demon & Black Shadow	
June 2, 1957-June 18, 1957	Mexican National Lightweight Championship tournament	8-man single elimination	Juan Díaz	
August 23, 1957-September 6, 1957	NWA World Welterweight Championship #1 contendership tournament	8-man single elimination	Black Shadow	
August 9, 1958	singles tournament	8-man single elimination	Manuel Robles (Note: decision later reversed and win awarded to finalist Black Shadow)	
March 13, 1959-April 3, 1959	Distrito Federal (Mexico City) Tag Team Championship tournament	4+ team single elimination	unknown	
September 8, 1959	Tarzán Lopez retirement show and benefit show for El Espectro	8-team single elimination	Alex Romano & Tarzán López	
May 15, 1960-May 29, 1960	Mexican National Light Heavyweight Championship tournament	8-man single elimination	Ruben Juarez	
June 9, 1961-June 23, 1961	Occidente Middleweight Championship #1 contendership tournament	8-man single elimination	Kiko Van Dick	
July 5, 1963-July 19, 1963	Occidente Middleweight Championship #1 contendership tournament	4-man single elimination (preceded by a battle royal eliminator)	Alfonso Dantes	
January 1, 1964-January 17, 1964	Occidente Welterweight Championship tournament	8-man single elimination	Vick Amezcua	
April 5, 1964-April 21, 1964	Mexican National Welterweight Championship tournament	???	Rizado Ruiz	
April 10, 1964-April 24, 1964	NWA World Middleweight Championship #1 contendership tournament	8-man single elimination	Benny Galant	
September 11, 1964-September 19, 1964	NWA World Middleweight Championship #1 contendership tournament	8-man single elimination	Rayo de Jalisco	
October 9, 1964-October 16, 1964	Campeonato 1964 tournament	8-team single elimination, final for the EMLL Arena México Tag Team Championship	Rayo de Jalisco and El Santo	
November 20, 1964	Torneo de Nueve	9-man single elimination (with a bye earned via battle royal)	Rubén Juárez	
March 19, 1965	NWA World Middleweight Championship #1 contendership tournament	8-man single elimination	Rene Guajardo	
March 19, 1965-April 2, 1965	Occidente Middleweight Championship tournament	8-man single elimination	Vick Amezcua	
July 23, 1965	NWA World Middleweight Championship #1 contendership tournament	8-man single elimination	Antonio Montoro	
October 7, 1966	Ruleta Rusa	8-team single elimination	Black Shadow and Rene Guajardo	
October 18, 1966-October 25, 1966	EMLL Arena Coliseo Tag Team Championship tournament	8-team single elimination	Chucho Villa & El Greco	
October 28, 1966	Ruleta Rusa	8-team single elimination	Black Shadow and Henry Pilusso	
November 8, 1966	Ruleta Rusa	8-team single elimination	Huroki Sito & Rodolfo Ruiz	
December 16, 1966-December 23, 1966	EMLL Arena México Tag Team Championship #1 contendership tournament	4-team single elimination	Ángel Blanco & Dr. Wagner	
September 29, 1967	NWA World Middleweight Championship tournament	16-man single elimination	Rene Guajardo	
September 22, 1967-October 6, 1967	Mexican National Light Heavyweight Championship #1 contendership tournament	8-man single elimination	Alfonso Dantés	
January 2, 1973-January 16, 1973	Occidente Light Heavyweight Championship tournament	8-man single elimination	Ivan el Bronco	
June 8, 1973	Cuadrangular de parejas	5-team single elimination (with a bye earned via battle royal)	El Solitario & Ray Mendoza	
October 19, 1973-October 26, 1973	EMLL Arena México Tag Team Championship tournament	4-team single elimination	El Halcón & El Solitario	
November 30, 1973-December 14, 1973	NWA World Welterweight Championship tournament	8-man single elimination	Mano Negra	
April 9, 1978	Torneo de las Alternativas	8-team single elimination	El Monarca and Flama Azul	
August 19, 1979-September 2, 1979	NWA World Middleweight Championship #1 contendership tournament	8-man single elimination	Satoru Sayama	
June 11, 1982-June 18, 1982	Mexican National Tag Team Championship tournament	4-team single elimination	Cachorro Mendoza and Ringo Mendoza	
September 5, 1982	Torneo de la Muerte	12-team "Losers advance" tournament (four receiving 2nd round byes), with a Luchas de Apuestas final between the remaining team	Enrique Vera and The Kiss	
January 25, 1985-February 10, 1985	Mexican National Trios Championship tournament	trios single elimination tournament	MS-1, Pirata Morgan and El Satánico	
January 23, 1987	Distrito Federal Women's Championship tournament	8-woman single elimination	Irma Aguilar	

=== 1990-1999 ===
Date(s)	Tournament	Format	Winner(s)	Ref.
May 18, 1990	Torneo de Parejas Relevos Increibles	8-team single elimination tournament	Angel Azteca and El Dandy	
July 27, 1990	Torneo de Trios Relevos Increibles	4-trios single elimination tournament	Cien Caras, Rayo de Jalisco Jr. and Mascara Ano 2000	
May 24, 1991-June 9, 1991	CMLL World Heavyweight Championship tournament	16-man single elimination tournament, featuring various match formats	Konnan El Barbaro	
October 25, 1991-November 22, 1991	CMLL World Trios Championship tournament	16-trios single elimination tournament	El Satánico, MS-1 and Pirata Morgan	
December 18, 1991	CMLL World Middleweight Championship tournament	8-man single elimination tournament	Blue Panther	
February 15, 1992	CMLL World Welterweight Championship tournament	4-man single elimination tournament	Fuerza Guerrera	
February 16, 1992-March 1, 1992	CMLL World Mini-Estrella Championship tournament	8-man single elimination tournament	Mascarita Sagrada	
June 5, 1992-June 12, 1992	CMLL World Women's Championship tournament	15-woman torneo cibernetico elimination match	Bull Nakano	
June 26, 1992-July 3, 1992	CMLL World Middleweight Championship tournament	16-man torneo cibernetico elimination match, with a singles final between the last two competitors	El Dandy	
August 9, 1992-August 16, 1992	Mexican National Welterweight Championship tournament	16-man single elimination tournament	Ciclón Ramírez	
November 3, 1992-November 20, 1992	CMLL World Heavyweight Championship tournament	16-man single elimination tournament	Black Magic	
February 26, 1993-March 26, 1993	CMLL World Tag Team Championship tournament	16-team single elimination tournament	Dr. Wagner Jr. and El Canek	
August 14, 1993-August 21, 1993	Mexican National Women's Championship tournament	4-woman torneo cibernetico elimination match, with a singles final between the last two competitors	La Diabólica	
January 14, 1994	Copa Arena Coliseo	8-team single elimination tournament	Bestia Salvaje and Cachorro Mendoza	
April 15, 1994	International Gran Prix	16-man single elimination tournament	Rayo de Jalisco Jr.	
July 22, 1994-August 4, 1994	CMLL World Tag Team Championship #1 contendership tournament	16-team single elimination tournament	El Texano and Silver King	
October 25, 1994	Copa de Oro	8-team single elimination tournament	Apolo Dantés and El Dandy	
November 11, 1994-December 2, 1994	CMLL World Tag Team Championship #2 contendership tournament	16-team single elimination tournament	El Satánico and Emilio Charles Jr.	
December 30, 1994	Torneo Gran Alternativa	8-team single elimination tournament	Héctor Garza and Negro Casas	
March 4, 1995	Copa Campeon de Campeones	6-man torneo cibernetico elimination match	Corazon de Leon	
March 24, 1995	Salvador Lutteroth Trios Tournament	8-trios single elimination tournament	Bestia Salvaje, Emilio Charles Jr. and Sangre Chicana	
April 7, 1995	Torneo Gran Alternativa	8-team single elimination tournament	Shocker and Silver King	
July 7, 1995	International Gran Prix	16-man single elimination tournament	Headhunter A	
September 1, 1995	Second Generation Tag Team Tournament	8-team single elimination tournament	Apolo Dantés and Emilio Charles Jr.	
October 24, 1995	Copa de Oro	8-team single elimination tournament	Chicago Express and Pierroth Jr.	
November 17, 1995-December 1, 1995	NWA World Welterweight Championship tournament	16-man single elimination tournament	El Hijo del Santo	
November 19, 1995	TWF World Women's Championship tournament	8-woman single elimination tournament	Lola Gonzalez	
February 23, 1996-March 1, 1996	La Copa Junior	16-man single elimination tournament	Héctor Garza	
May 7, 1996-May 21, 1996	CMLL World Welterweight Championship tournament	16-man single elimination tournament	Máscara Mágica	
June 7, 1996	Trofeo Arena Coliseo	8-team single elimination tournament	Bestia Salvaje and Chicago Express	
July 5, 1996	International Gran Prix	16-man single elimination tournament	El Hijo del Santo	
November 8, 1996	CMLL World Women's Championship tournament	4-woman single elimination tournament	Lady Apache	
November 15, 1996	Torneo Gran Alternativa	8-team single elimination tournament	Emilio Charles Jr. and Rey Bucanero	
February 21, 1997-February 28, 1997	CMLL World Tag Team Championship tournament	8-team single elimination tournament	Dr. Wagner Jr. and Silver King	
March 21, 1997	CMLL World Trios Championship tournament	8-trios single elimination tournament	Emilio Charles Jr., Rey Bucanero and El Satánico	
April 4, 1997	International Gran Prix	16-man single elimination tournament	Steele	
August 22, 1997-August 29, 1997	CMLL World Tag Team Championship tournament	8-team single elimination tournament	Dr. Wagner Jr. and Silver King	
October 31, 1997-December 5, 1997	Copa Victoria	16-man double-elimination tournament	Atlantis	
January 9, 1998	Torneo de Reyes	8-team single elimination tournament	Mr. Niebla and Shocker	
March 20, 1998	Torneo Salvador Lutteroth	8-man single elimination tournament	Mr. Niebla	
May 15, 1998	Torneo de Parejas Increibles	8-team single elimination tournament	no winner - double DQ	
July 14, 1998	Torneo Gran Alternativa	8-team single elimination tournament	Emilio Charles Jr. and Tony Rivera	
July 18, 1998	Ruleta de la Muerte	16-team "Losers advance" tournament, with a Luchas de Apuestas final between the remaining team	El Hijo del Santo	
July 24, 1998-July 31, 1998	Leyenda de Plata	16-man torneo cibernetico elimination match, with a singles final against El Hijo del Santo	Scorpio Jr.	
August 14, 1998	International Gran Prix	16-man single elimination tournament	Apolo Dantés	
October 30, 1998-November 13, 1998	CMLL World Tag Team Championship tournament	8-team single elimination tournament	Bestia Salvaje and Scorpio Jr.	
December 4, 1998-December 18, 1998	CMLL World Trios Championship tournament	8-trio single elimination tournament	Black Warrior, Blue Panther and Dr. Wagner Jr.	
March 19, 1999	Salvador Lutteroth Tag Team Tournament	8-team single elimination tournament	Ringo Mendoza and Super Astro	
April 2, 1999	Torneo Gran Alternativa	8-team single elimination tournament	Blue Panther and Último Guerrero	
July 5, 1999	CMLL World Tag Team Championship #1 contendership tournament	8-team single elimination tournament	Blue Panther and Fuerza Guerrera	
July 18, 1999	Ruleta de la Muerte	8-team "Losers advance" tournament, with a Luchas de Apuestas final between the remaining team	Shocker	
November 26, 1999-December 3, 1999	Leyenda de Plata	16-man torneo cibernetico elimination match, and a singles final against the previous winner	El Hijo del Santo	
December 10, 1999	Copa de Arena Mexico	4-trios team single elimination tournament	El Satánico, Rey Bucanero and Último Guerrero	
December 17, 1999	Torneo Gran Alternativa	8-team single elimination tournament	El Felino and Tigre Blanco	

=== 2000-2009 ===
Date(s)	Tournament	Format	Winner(s)	Ref.
March 17, 2000	Torneo Siglo XXI 2000	16-man torneo cibernetico elimination match	Último Guerrero	
April 21, 2000	Carnaval Increible Trios tournament	8-trios single elimination tournament	Mr. Niebla, Rey Bucanero and Último Guerrero	
June 23, 2000-August 4, 2000	CMLL World Tag Team Championship tournament	16-team single elimination tournament	Rey Bucanero and Último Guerrero	
September 8, 2000	CMLL World Trios Championship #1 contendership tournament	8-trios single elimination tournament	Villano III, Villano IV and Villano V	
September 22, 2000-October 6, 2000	Leyenda de Plata	16-man torneo cibernetico elimination match, with a singles semi-final between the last two competitors, and a singles final against the previous winner	Negro Casas	
September 27, 2000	Leyenda de Azul	16-man torneo cibernetico elimination match	Blue Panther	
November 7, 2000	CMLL Arena Coliseo Tag Team Championship tournament	8-team single elimination tournament	Alan Stone and Motocross	
August 14, 2001	Torneo Gran Alternativa	8-team single elimination tournament	Olímpico and Sicodelico Jr.	
October 5, 2001-October 19, 2001	Leyenda de Plata	16-man torneo cibernetico elimination match, with a singles semi-final between the last two competitors, and a singles final against the previous winner	Black Warrior	
December 18, 2001	Copa de Arena Mexico	8-trios single elimination tournament	Shocker, Apolo Dantés and Black Warrior	
March 1, 2002-March 15, 2002	CMLL World Trios Championship #1 contendership tournament	8-trios single elimination tournament	Rey Bucanero, Tarzan Boy and Último Guerrero	
March 22, 2002	International Gran Prix	16-man torneo cibernetico elimination match	Máscara Mágica	
July 5, 2002	Copa de Arena Mexico	8-trios single elimination tournament	Rayo de Jalisco Jr., Black Warrior and Lizmark Jr.	
July 26, 2002-August 9, 2002	Leyenda de Plata	16-man torneo cibernetico elimination match, with a singles semi-final between the last two competitors, and a singles final against the previous winner	El Felino	
October 22, 2002-April 4, 2003	Guapos U Tournament	faux-tournament ultimately culminating in a tag team semi-final and a singles final between the winning team	El Terrible	
November 1, 2002-November 15, 2002	CMLL World Trios Championship #1 contendership tournament	16-trios single elimination tournament	Apolo Dantés, Black Tiger and Dr. Wagner Jr.	
January 1, 2003	Torneo Gran Alternativa	8-team single elimination tournament	Villano IV and Alan Stone	
May 9, 2003	International Gran Prix	16-man torneo cibernetico elimination match	Dr. Wagner Jr.	
July 4, 2003-July 18, 2003	CMLL World Trios Championship #1 contendership tournament	8-trios single elimination tournament	Averno, El Satánico and Mephisto	
August 8, 2003	Leyenda de Azul	16-man torneo cibernetico elimination match	Tarzan Boy	
September 5, 2003-September 12, 2003	CMLL World Super Lightweight Championship tournament	12-man single elimination tournament	Rocky Romero	
September 16, 2003	Relevos Increibles Tag Team Tournament	4-team single elimination tournament	Rayo de Jalisco Jr. & El Satanico	
November 11, 2003	MPW Tohoku Junior Heavyweight championship #1 contendership tournament	4-man single elimination tournament	Perro Aguayo Jr.	
November 21, 2003-December 5, 2003	Mexican National Trios Championship tournament	8-trios single elimination tournament	El Felino, Safari and Volador Jr.	
March 16, 2004-May 21, 2004	Guapos U Tournament	series of weekly trios matches, culminating in a Mexican National Trios Championship #1 contenders match, and the overall winner being announced online	Alan Stone	
May 4, 2004-May 28, 2004	Mexican National Trios Championship #1 contenders tournament	4-trios single elimination tournament	Brazo de Oro Jr., El Texano Jr. and Misterioso Jr.	
July 16, 2004-July 30, 2004	Leyenda de Plata	16-man torneo cibernetico elimination match, with a singles semi-final between the last two competitors, and a singles final against the previous winner	Perro Aguayo Jr.	
August 20, 2004	Torneo Gran Alternativa	8-team single elimination tournament	El Hijo del Santo and Místico	
August 10, 2004	Leyenda de Azul	16-man torneo cibernetico elimination match	Universo 2000	
September 25, 2004	El Trofeo del 71 Aniversario (Note: despite being a sole single fall match, winner(s) were still awarded a standard tournament trophy)	16-man single elimination tournament	Negro Casas	
January 21, 2005-February 4, 2005	La Copa Junior	16-man single elimination tournament	Shocker	
June 10, 2005	Reyes del Aire	10-man torneo cibernetico elimination match	Volador Jr.	
July 1, 2005	Torneo Gran Alternativa	8-team single elimination tournament	Atlantis and La Máscara	
July 15, 2005	Leyenda de Azul	16-man single elimination tournament	Lizmark Jr.	
July 29, 2005-August 12, 2005	Mexican G1 Junior Climax	two torneo cibernetico elimination matches (one 8-man, one 7-man), and a singles final	El Texano Jr.	
September 9, 2005-September 16, 2005	CMLL World Women's Championship tournament	9-woman torneo cibernetico elimination match, and a singles final between the last two competitors	Marcela	
September 23, 2005	International Gran Prix	16-man torneo cibernetico elimination match	Atlantis	
October 28, 2005-November 11, 2005	Leyenda de Plata	two 8-man torneo cibernetico elimination matches, and a singles final	Atlantis	
November 6, 2005	CMLL World Tag Team Championship #1 contendership tournament	8-team single elimination tournament	Heavy Metal and Negro Casas	
March 31, 2006	La Copa Junior	16-man single elimination tournament	Dos Caras Jr.	
May 12, 2006	International Gran Prix	16-man torneo cibernetico elimination match	Último Guerrero	
June 2, 2006	Torneo Gran Alternativa	8-team single elimination tournament	Misterioso Jr. and Perro Aguayo Jr.	
June 18, 2006	Reyes del Aire	10-man torneo cibernetico elimination match	La Máscara	
August 25, 2006-September 15, 2006	Leyenda de Plata	two 8-man torneo cibernetico elimination matches, with a singles semi-final, and a singles final against the previous winner	Místico	
November 3, 2006	Leyenda de Azul	16-man single elimination tournament	Rey Bucanero	
February 16, 2007	Reyes del Aire	16-man torneo cibernetico elimination match	Volador Jr.	
April 27, 2007-May 4, 2007	Mexican National Women's Championship tournament	14-woman torneo cibernetico elimination matches, and a singles final between the last two competitors	Marcela	
May 11, 2007	International Gran Prix	16-man torneo cibernetico elimination match	Último Guerrero	
May 18, 2007-June 8, 2007	Leyenda de Plata	two 10-man torneo cibernetico elimination matches, with a singles semi-final, and a singles final against the previous winner	Místico	
June 29, 2007	Torneo Gran Alternativa	8-team single elimination tournament	La Sombra and Místico	
July 13, 2007	Pequeño Reyes del Aire	10-man torneo cibernetico elimination match	Pequeño Damián 666	
September 5, 2007	Gran Alternativa (Madero)	6-team match	Satanico and Silver Fox	
October 2, 2007	Reyes del Aire	12-man torneo cibernetico elimination match	Virus	
November 9, 2007	CMLL World Women's Championship #1 Contendership	8-woman torneo cibernetico elimination match	La Amapola	
November 18, 2007	La Copa Diablo Velazco	8-man torneo cibernetico elimination match	Atlantis	
January 1, 2008	Pequeño Reyes del Aire	10-man torneo cibernetico elimination match	Mascarita Dorada	
January 11, 2008-January 25, 2008	CMLL World Tag Team Championship #1 contendership tournament	16-team single elimination tournament	Averno and Mephisto	
May 9, 2008	Reyes del Aire	16-man torneo cibernetico elimination match	Valiente	
May 18, 2008	Copa Su Bodega	6-man torneo cibernetico elimination match	El Hijo del Fantasma	
May 30, 2008-June 13, 2008	CMLL World Trios Championship tournament	8-trios single elimination tournament	El Hijo del Fantasma, Héctor Garza and La Máscara	
June 15, 2008-June 26, 2008	CMLL Arena Coliseo Tag Team Championship tournament	16-team single elimination tournament	Flash and Stuka Jr.	
July 4, 2008-July 4, 2008	Leyenda de Plata	two 10-man torneo cibernetico elimination matches, with a singles semi-final, and a singles final against the previous winner	Místico	
July 18, 2008	Torneo Gran Alternativa	8-team single elimination tournament	Dragón Rojo Jr. and Último Guerrero	
July 26, 2008	International Gran Prix	16-man torneo cibernetico elimination match	Alex Shelley	
September 9, 2008-September 23, 2008	Mexican National Lightweight Championship tournament	two torneo cibernetico elimination matches (one 10-man, one 12-man), and a singles final	Pierrothito	
October 5, 2008-November 2, 2008	El Torneo Corona	8-team single elimination tournament	La Sombra and Metalik	
November 23, 2008	La Copa Diablo Velazco	10-man torneo cibernetico elimination match	Blue Panther	
December 12, 2008	Leyenda de Azul	16-man torneo cibernetico elimination match	El Terrible	
January 6, 2009	Pequeño Reyes del Aire	10-man torneo cibernetico elimination match	Pequeño Black Warrior	
February 15, 2009-April 12, 2009	Torneo Tanque Dantes	6-team Round-robin tournament	Palacio Negro and Samurai	
June 5, 2009-June 19, 2009	Universal Championship tournament	16-man single elimination tournament	Último Guerrero	
July 17, 2009	Copa Herdez	12-man mini-estrellas torneo cibernetico elimination match	Último Guerrero	
September 25, 2009	Torneo Gran Alternativa	8-team single elimination tournament	Okumura and Yujiro	
October 12, 2009	Reyes del Aire	12-man torneo cibernetico elimination match	Volador Jr.	
November 30, 2009	CMLL World Women's Championship #1 Contendership	10-woman torneo cibernetico elimination match	Marcela	
December 19, 2009	Campeon Azteca tournament	2 trios matches, with a 6-way elimination semi-final, and a singles final between the last two competitors	Último Guerrero	
December 22, 2009-January 6, 2010	Mexican National Trios Championship tournament	8-trios single elimination tournament	Máscara Dorada, Stuka Jr., and Metro	

=== 2010-2019 ===
Date(s)	Tournament	Format	Winner(s)	Ref.
January 22, 2010-February 5, 2010	Torneo Nacional de Parejas Increíbles	16-team single elimination tournament	Atlantis and Máscara Dorada	
March 7, 2010	Pequeño Reyes del Aire	10-man torneo cibernetico elimination match	Pequeño Nitro	
April 16, 2010-April 30, 2010	Torneo Gran Alternativa	16-team single elimination tournament	Héctor Garza and Pólvora	
May 2, 2010-June 6, 2010	Occidente Light Heavyweight Championship tournament	8-man single elimination tournament	El Gallo	
July 30, 2010-August 13, 2010	Universal Championship tournament	16-man single elimination tournament	Jushin Thunder Liger	
July 31, 2010	Copa Herdez	4-way tag team elimination match	Los Guerreros del Atlantida (Rey Bucanero & Ultimo Guerrero)	
August 10, 2010-August 24, 2010	Torneo Bicentenario de Mini-Estrellas	two 8-man torneo cibernetico elimination matches, and a singles final	Demus 3:16	
September 7, 2010-September 19, 2010	Copa Bicentenario	16-team single elimination tournament, with the final two teams facing their own partners in singles matches to advance to the singles final	Volador Jr.	
October 3, 2010-October 17, 2010	CMLL Arena Coliseo Tag Team Championship #1 contendership tournament	16-team single elimination tournament	Delta and Diamante	
December 10, 2010-December 25, 2010	La Copa Junior	20-man single elimination tournament (with byes earned via battle royal)	Dragón Rojo Jr.	
December 18, 2010-January 2, 2011	Mexican National Trios Championship #1 contendership tournament	8-trios single elimination tournament	Ángel de Oro, Diamante and Rush	
January 1, 2011	Reyes del Aire	16-man torneo cibernetico elimination match	Ángel de Oro	
January 18, 2011	CMLL World Women's Championship #1 Contendership	14-woman torneo cibernetico elimination match	Marcela	
February 6, 2011	Pequeño Reyes del Aire	10-man torneo cibernetico elimination match	Pequeño Olímpico	
February 11, 2011-February 25, 2011	Torneo Nacional de Parejas Increíbles	16-team single elimination tournament	Atlantis and Máscara Dorada	
March 25, 2011-March 25, 2011	Torneo Gran Alternativa	16-team single elimination tournament	Escorpión and Último Guerrero	
April 11, 2011-May 27, 2011	Forjando un Ídolo	16-man Round-robin tournament	Ángel de Oro	
May 24, 2011-June 7, 2011	CMLL World Super Lightweight Championship tournament	singles tournament	Virus	
June 3, 2011-June 24, 2011	Forjando un Ídolo: La Guerra Continúa	4-trios round-robin tournament	Atlantis, Delta and Guerrero Maya Jr.	
June 7, 2011-June 21, 2011	NWA World Historic Light Heavyweight Championship tournament	12-man torneo cibernetico elimination match	Rey Bucanero	
July 29, 2011	Leyenda de Azul	16-man torneo cibernetico elimination match	Mr. Niebla	
July 30, 2011	Copa Herdez	10-woman torneo cibernetico elimination match	Lady Apache	
August 21, 2011	Torneo de Parejas Increibles de Mini-Estrellas	8-team, losers advance tournament, with a Luchas de Apuestas final between the remaining team	Pierrothito	
September 2, 2011-September 15, 2011	Universal Championship tournament	16-man single elimination tournament	La Sombra	
September 10, 2011	PWR World Women's Title #1 Contendership	10-woman torneo cibernetico elimination tournament	Lady Apache	
September 23, 2011-October 7, 2011	Leyenda de Plata	two 12-man torneo cibernetico elimination matches, and a singles final	Volador Jr.	
October 15, 2011	CMLL-Reina International Junior Championship #1 Contendership	8-woman torneo cibernetico elimination tournament	Silueta	
November 26, 2011	Trofeo Revolucion 101	16-man torneo cibernetico elimination match	Shocker	
December 25, 2011-January 1, 2012	CMLL World Heavyweight Championship tournament	12-man torneo cibernetico elimination match, with a singles final between the last two competitors	El Terrible	
February 3, 2012	Reyes del Aire	18-man torneo cibernetico elimination match	Ángel de Oro	
February 17, 2012-March 2, 2012	Torneo Nacional de Parejas Increíbles	16-team single elimination tournament	Atlantis and Mr. Niebla	
March 6, 2012	Copa Homenaje a Dos Leyendas	10-man torneo cibernetico elimination match	Volador Jr.	
March 6, 2012-March 20, 2012	Torneo Sangre Nueva	16-man round-robin tournament	Dragon Lee	
March 12, 2012	Copa Lutteroth-Bonales	10-man torneo cibernetico elimination match	El Terrible	
March 29, 2012	Trofeo Pachuca	4-team single elimination tournament	Rush and El Terrible	
March 30, 2012-April 13, 2012	Torneo Gran Alternativa	16-team single elimination tournament	El Terrible and Euforia	
April 27, 2012-June 22, 2012	En Busca de un Ídolo	8-man Round-robin tournament	Titán	
May 1, 2012	Pequeño Reyes del Aire	16-man torneo cibernetico elimination match	Ultimo Dragoncito	
June 19, 2012	Copa 53. Aniversario de Arena Coliseo de Guadalajara	10-man torneo cibernetico elimination match	Volador Jr.	
July 13, 2012-July 20, 2012	Occidente Heavyweight Championship tournament	12-man torneo cibernetico elimination match, with a singles final between the last two competitors	Diamante	
August 14, 2012-August 28, 2012	Occidente Middleweight Championship tournament	two 8-man torneo cibernetico elimination matches, and a singles final	Smaker	
August 17, 2012-August 31, 2012	Universal Championship tournament	16-man single elimination tournament	El Terrible	
October 12, 2012	Leyenda de Azul	16-man torneo cibernetico elimination match	Diamante Azul	
October 15, 2012	Reyes del Aire	12-man torneo cibernetico elimination match	Valiente	
October 30, 2012	Pequeño Reyes del Aire	12-man torneo cibernetico elimination match	Pequeño Black Warrior	
November 30, 2012-December 14, 2012	La Copa Junior	two 8-man torneo cibernetico elimination matches, and a singles final	La Sombra	
January 6, 2013	Pequeño Reyes del Aire	12-man torneo cibernetico elimination match	Aéreo	
January 20, 2013-February 3, 2013	Occidente Welterweight Championship tournament	8-man torneo cibernetico elimination match, with a singles final between the last two competitors	Leo	
January 22, 2013-January 29, 2013	CMLL World Light Heavyweight Championship tournament	16-man torneo cibernetico elimination match, with a singles final between the last two competitors	Rey Escorpión	
February 1, 2013-February 15, 2013	Reyes del Aire	two 16-man torneo cibernetico elimination matches, and a singles final	La Sombra	
February 26, 2013-March 12, 2013	Torneo Sangre Nueva	two 10-man torneo cibernetico elimination matches, and a singles final	Soberano Jr.	
March 1, 2013-March 15, 2013	Torneo Nacional de Parejas Increíbles	16-team single elimination tournament	La Sombra and Volador Jr.	
March 18, 2013-April 1, 2013	Torneo Increibles de Parejas	16-team single elimination tournament	Atlantis and Volador Jr.	
April 7, 2013	Trofeo 70. Aniversario de Arena Coliseo	10-woman torneo cibernetico elimination match	Goya Kong	
April 12, 2013-April 26, 2013	Torneo Gran Alternativa	16-team single elimination tournament	Bobby Zavala and Rey Escorpión	
April 19, 2013-April 26, 2013	Mexican National Welterweight Championship tournament	10-man torneo cibernetico elimination match	Averno	
May 17, 2013-July 12, 2013	En Busca de un Ídolo	8-man Round-robin tournament	Vangelis	
May 28, 2013	CMLL-Reina International Junior Championship #1 Contendership	10-woman torneo cibernetico elimination tournament	Zeuxis	
June 9, 2013-June 16, 2013	CMLL World Trios Championship tournament	8-man single elimination tournament	Máscara Dorada, Místico, Valiente	
July 30, 2013-August 13, 2013	Mexican National Lightweight Championship tournament	two 6-man torneo cibernetico elimination matches, and a singles final	Eléctrico	
August 23, 2013-September 6, 2013	Universal Championship tournament	16-man single elimination tournament	Hiroshi Tanahashi	
September 8, 2013-September 22, 2013	Occidente Tag Team Championship tournament	two 4-way elimination semi-finals, and a tag team final	Mr. Trueno and Rey Trueno	
September 24, 2013-October 8, 2013	CMLL World Tag Team Championship #1 contendership tournament	16-team single elimination tournament	La Máscara and Rush	
December 20, 2013-January 1, 2014	Leyenda de Plata	two 12-man torneo cibernetico elimination matches, and a singles final	Negro Casas	
December 22, 2013	CMLL World Women's Championship #1 Contendership	10-woman torneo cibernetico elimination tournament	Princesa Sugehit	
January 1, 2014	La Copa Junior	10-man torneo cibernetico elimination match	Super Halcón Jr.	
January 4, 2014	Pequeño Reyes del Aire	10-man torneo cibernetico elimination match	Eléctrico	
January 31, 2014-February 14, 2014	Torneo Gran Alternativa	16-team single elimination tournament	Bárbaro Cavernario and Mr. Niebla	
March 7, 2014-March 21, 2014	Torneo Nacional de Parejas Increíbles	16-team single elimination tournament	Atlantis and Euforia	
April 4, 2014-June 20, 2014	En Busca de un Ídolo	8-man Round-robin tournament	Bárbaro Cavernario	
April 12, 2014	CMLL-Reina International Championship #1 Contendership	10-woman torneo cibernetico elimination tournament	La Amapola	
April 27, 2014	Pequeño Reyes del Aire	12-man torneo cibernetico elimination match	Stuka Jr.	
June 20, 2014	Leyenda de Azul	16-man torneo cibernetico elimination match	Atlantis	
June 24, 2014	Copa Express	4-team single elimination tournament	Atlantis & Titan	
August 4, 2014	Reyes del Aire	10-man torneo cibernetico elimination match	Rey Escorpión	
August 15, 2014-August 29, 2014	Universal Championship tournament	16-man single elimination tournament	Último Guerrero	
September 1, 2014-September 16, 2014	Copa CMLL	16-team single elimination tournament	Marco Corleone and Rush	
September 19, 2014	Copa 81. Aniversario	8-woman torneo cibernetico elimination tournament	Zeuxis	
September 26, 2014-October 10, 2014	La Copa Junior VIP	16-man single elimination tournament	Máximo	
December 26, 2014-January 2, 2015	CMLL World Welterweight Championship tournament	10-man torneo cibernetico elimination match, with a singles final between the last two competitors	Máscara Dorada	
January 6, 2015	Pequeño Reyes del Aire	10-man torneo cibernetico elimination match	Shockercito	
January 17, 2015	Fantastica Mania Tag Team Tournament	8-team single elimination tournament	Atlantis & Mascara Dorada	
January 23, 2015-February 13, 2015	Occidente Tag Team Championship #1 contendership tournament	12-team single elimination tournament	El Gallo and Esfinge	
February 20, 2015-March 6, 2015	Torneo Nacional de Parejas Increíbles	16-team single elimination tournament	El Terrible and Máximo	
March 1, 2015-March 8, 2015	NWA World Historic Light Heavyweight Championship tournament	12-man torneo cibernetico elimination match	Rey Bucanero	
April 17, 2015-May 3, 2015	Occidente Trios Championship tournament	8-trios single elimination tournament	Furia Roja, Mr. Trueno and Rey Trueno	
May 1, 2015	Reyes del Aire	16-man torneo cibernetico elimination match	La Sombra	
May 15, 2015-May 22, 2015	Leyenda de Plata	12-man torneo cibernetico elimination match, and a singles final against the previous winner	Negro Casas	
June 5, 2015-August 21, 2015	En Busca de un Ídolo	8-man Round-robin tournament	Boby Zavala	
June 13, 2015	CMLL World Women's Championship #1 Contendership	8-woman torneo cibernetico elimination tournament	Dalys la Caribeña	
July 10, 2015	Copa Femenil X Aniversario	12-woman torneo cibernetico elimination tournament	Dalys la Caribeña	
October 2, 2015-October 16, 2015	Universal Championship tournament	16-man single elimination tournament	Atlantis	
January 5, 2016-January 19, 2016	La Copa Junior	two 8-man torneo cibernetico elimination matches, and a singles final	Esfinge	
January 10, 2016-January 31, 2016	Occidente Middleweight Championship tournament	8-man single elimination tournament	Jocker	
March 22, 2016-April 5, 2016	Torneo Gran Alternativa	16-team single elimination tournament	Esfinge and Volador Jr.	
April 15, 2016-April 29, 2016	Torneo Nacional de Parejas Increíbles	16-team single elimination tournament	Místico and Mephisto	
April 26, 2016	Torneo Femenil 60. Aniversario de la Arena México	10-woman torneo cibernetico elimination tournament	Zeuxis	
July 1, 2016	International Gran Prix	16-man torneo cibernetico elimination match	Volador Jr.	
July 11, 2016	Torneo de Parejas Increibles Internacionales	8-team single elimination tournament	Atlantis and Último Guerrero	
July 12, 2016	Cuadrangular de Parejas	4-team single elimination tournament	Marco Corleone and Kushida	
July 15, 2016-July 22, 2016	Leyenda de Plata	12-man torneo cibernetico elimination match, and a singles final against the previous winner	La Máscara	
July 15, 2016-July 16, 2016	Torneo Homenaje A Dr. X	18-man torneo cibernetico elimination match	Skándalo	
July 31, 2016	Copa Femenil 2016	12-woman torneo cibernetico elimination tournament	Princesa Sugehit	
September 23, 2016-September 30, 2016	Reyes del Aire	12-man torneo cibernetico elimination match, with a singles final between the last two competitors	Bárbaro Cavernario	
October 14, 2016-October 28, 2016	Universal Championship tournament	16-man single elimination tournament	Valiente	
November 18, 2016	Leyenda de Azul	16-man torneo cibernetico elimination match	Último Guerrero	
November 25, 2016	Copa Dinastia	4-trios single elimination tournament	Negro Casas, Puma King and Tiger	
November 27, 2016	Copa Dinastia Tapatia 2016	4-trios single elimination tournament (Note: advertised as the first eliminator stage of a multi-week tournament, but never continued)	Flash, Flash I & Flash II	
February 10, 2017-February 24, 2017	Torneo Nacional de Parejas Increíbles	16-team single elimination tournament	Bárbaro Cavernario and Volador Jr.	
April 7, 2017	Reyes del Aire	16-man torneo cibernetico elimination match	Ángel de Oro	
April 14, 2017-April 28, 2017	La Copa Junior	two 8-man torneo cibernetico elimination matches, and a singles final	Soberano Jr.	
June 6, 2017	CMLL World Heavyweight Championship tournament	10-man torneo cibernetico elimination match	Marco Corleone	
June 2, 2017-June 16, 2017	Torneo Gran Alternativa	16-team single elimination tournament	Carístico and Soberano Jr.	
June 30, 2017-July 14, 2017	Universal Championship tournament	16-man single elimination tournament	Volador Jr.	
July 21, 2017	Copa Natalia Vazquez	14-woman torneo cibernetico elimination tournament	Princesa Sugehit	
August 6, 2017	CMLL-Reina International Championship #1 Contendership	14-woman torneo cibernetico elimination tournament	Marcela	
September 1, 2017	International Gran Prix	16-man torneo cibernetico elimination match	Diamante Azul	
October 13, 2017-October 20, 2017	Leyenda de Plata	16-man torneo cibernetico elimination match, with a singles final between the last two competitors	Volador Jr.	
October 22, 2017-October 29, 2017	Mexican National Heavyweight Championship tournament	12-man torneo cibernetico elimination match, with a singles final between the last two competitors	El Terrible	
November 8, 2017	Rey del Inframundo	8-man torneo cibernetico elimination match	Sansón	
November 24, 2017	Copa Dinastia	4-trios single elimination tournament	El Cuatrero, Forastero and Sansón	
December 1, 2017	La Copa Junior VIP	12-man torneo cibernetico elimination match	Niebla Roja	
December 10, 2017	Occidente Middleweight Championship #1 contendership tournament	10-man torneo cibernetico elimination match	Difunto	
November 3, 1963-November 15, 1963	Mexican National Welterweight Championship tournament	4-man single elimination	Javier Escobedo	
December 11, 2017	Reyes del Aire VIP (Puebla)	10-man torneo cibernetico elimination match	Mephisto	
December 27, 2017	Leyenda de Azul	16-man torneo cibernetico elimination match	Rush	
January 21, 2018-January 22, 2018	Brothers Tag Tournament	4-team single elimination tournament	Gran Guerrero and Último Guerrero	
February 2, 2018-February 23, 2018	Torneo Nacional de Parejas Increíbles	16-team single elimination tournament	El Terrible and Rush	
February 24, 2018-March 10, 2018	CMLL Arena Coliseo Tag Team Championship tournament	16-team single elimination tournament	Esfinge and Tritón	
March 2, 2018-March 16, 2018	CMLL World Tag Team Championship tournament	16-team single elimination tournament	El Sky Team (Valiente and Volador Jr.)	
April 3, 2018-April 17, 2018	Copa Nuevos Valores	16-man single elimination tournament	Magia Blanca	
May 4, 2018-May 18, 2018	Torneo Gran Alternativa	16-team single elimination tournament	Flyer and Volador Jr.	
June 17, 2018	La Copa 59 Anniverasrio	10-man torneo cibernetico elimination match	El Rielero	
October 4, 2018	International Gran Prix	18-man torneo cibernetico elimination match	Michael Elgin	
October 9, 2018-October 15, 2018	CMLL World Heavyweight Championship tournament	12-man torneo cibernetico elimination match, with a singles final between the last two competitors	Último Guerrero	
October 19, 2018	Copa Halcón Suriano	10-man torneo cibernetico elimination match	Ángel de Oro	
October 26, 2018-November 2, 2018	Rey del Inframundo	12-man torneo cibernetico elimination match, and a singles final against the previous winner	Sansón	
November 16, 2018-November 23, 2018	Leyenda de Plata	12-man torneo cibernetico elimination match, with a singles final between the last two competitors	Bárbaro Cavernario	
January 6, 2019	Reyes del Aire	16-man torneo cibernetico elimination match	Titán	
January 16, 2019-January 18, 2019	Family tag team tournament	4-team single elimination tournament	Místico and Dragon Lee	
January 28, 2019	Torneo Nacional de Parejas Increíbles (Puebla)	8-team single elimination tournament	Diamante Azul & Tiger	
February 2, 2019-February 16, 2019	Universal Championship	16-man single elimination tournament	El Terrible	
April 12, 2019-April 26, 2019	Torneo Nacional de Parejas Increíbles	16-team single elimination tournament	Titán and Bárbaro Cavernario	
June 7, 2019-June 21, 2019	La Copa Dinastia	8-team single elimination tournament	Ángel de Oro and Niebla Roja	
July 14, 2019-July 28, 2019	Torneo de Parejas Increíbles (Guadalajara)	12-team single elimination tournament	Difunto & Star Black	
August 2, 2019-August 16, 2019	Universal Amazonas Championship	two 10-woman torneo cibernetico elimination matches, and a singles final	Dalys la Caribeña	
August 30, 2019	International Gran Prix	16-man torneo cibernetico elimination match	Volador Jr.	
September 1, 2019	Torneo de Dinastias (Guadalajara)	4-way tag team elimination match	Mr. Trueno and Rey Trueno	
October 4, 2019-October 19, 2019	Gran Alternativa	16-team single elimination tournament	Star Jr. and Valiente	
October 27, 2019-November 1, 2019	Rey del Inframundo	10-man torneo cibernetico elimination match, and a singles final against the previous winner	Sansón	
December 1, 2019-December 8, 2019	CMLL World Welterweight Championship	10-man torneo cibernetico elimination match, with a singles final between the last two competitors	Titan	
December 3, 2019-December 17, 2019	La Copa Junior	two 10-woman torneo cibernetico elimination matches, and a singles final	Universo 2000 Jr.	

=== 2020-present ===
Date(s)	Tournament	Format	Winner(s)	Ref.
January 14, 2020	Reyes del Aire	12-man torneo cibernetico elimination match	Templario	
January 16, 2020–January 17, 2020	Family tag team tournament	4-team single elimination tournament	Nueva Generación Dinamitas (El Cuatrero and Sansón)	
February 14, 2020–February 28, 2020	Torneo Nacional de Parejas Increíbles	16-team single elimination tournament	Carístico and Forastero	
February 24, 2020	Torneo de parejas familiares	8-team single elimination tournament	Nueva Generación Dinamitas (El Cuatrero and Sansón)	
February 28, 2020-March 13, 2020	Mexican National Tag Team Championship tournament	16-team single elimination tournament	Atlantis Jr. and Flyer	
April 20, 2020–May 18, 2020	Occidente Trios Championship tournament	16-team single elimination tournament	Explosivo, Fantástico and Star Black	
June 22, 2020–July 6, 2020	Occidente Women's Championship tournament	8-woman torneo cibernetico elimination match, a tag team elimination match semi-final, and a singles final	Silueta	
October 2, 2020–October 16, 2020	Mexican National Women's Tag Team Championship tournament	16-team single elimination tournament	La Jarochita and Lluvia	
October 23, 2020–October 30, 2020	Rey del Inframundo	10-man torneo cibernetico elimination match, and a singles final	El Terrible	
November 27, 2020	Leyenda de Azul	16-man torneo cibernetico elimination match	Angel de Oro	
March 26, 2021	La Copa Junior VIP	12-man torneo cibernetico elimination match	Angel de Oro	
May 28, 2021	Copa Dinastías	10-team single elimination tournament (with "second chance" twist)	Los Hermanos Panther (Blue Panther Jr. and Black Panther)	
June 11, 2021–June 25, 2021	Torneo Increíble de Parejas	16-team single elimination tournament	Templario and Volador Jr.	
July 16, 2021–July 30, 2021	Leyenda de Plata	16-man single elimination tournament	Titán	
August 20, 2021–August 27, 2021	CMLL Universal Amazonas Championship	13-woman torneo cibernetico elimination match (Note: Stephanie Vaquer was announced as the 14th, but injured the week of the tournament)	La Jarochita	
September 3, 2021–September 17, 2021	Copa Independencia	two 12-man torneo cibernetico elimination matches, and a singles final	Volador Jr.	
October 8, 2021	International Women's Gran Prix	14-woman torneo cibernetico elimination match	Dark Silueta	
October 19, 2021	Torneo Increible De Amazonas	8-team single elimination tournament	Dalys la Caribena and Princesa Sugehit	
November 5, 2021	Rey del Inframundo championship	10-man torneo cibernetico elimination match, and a singles final against the previous winner	El Terrible	
November 6, 2021	Torneo La Gran Oportunidad	12-man torneo cibernetico elimination match	Hombre Bala Jr.	
November 26, 2021	Leyenda de Azul	16-man torneo cibernetico elimination match	El Soberano Jr.	
December 10, 2021–December 25, 2021	Gran Alternativa	16-team single elimination tournament	El Coyote and Euforia	
January 28, 2022	Reyes del Aire	10-man torneo cibernetico elimination match	Stuka Jr.	
February 25, 2022	Torneo Increible de Parejas	8-team single elimination tournament	Atlantis Jr.	
March 4, 2022	Mexican National Heavyweight Championship Tournament	8-man single elimination tournament	Euforia	
March 11, 2022–March 18, 2022	Torneo Relevos Suicidas De Amazonas	8-team single elimination Torneo Relevos Suicidas tournament	Reyna Isis	
March 15, 2022	CMLL World Lightweight Championship Tournament	8-man single elimination tournament	Stigma	
March 18, 2022	CMLL World Trios Championship Tournament	4-team single elimination tournament	Los Malditos (El Sagrado, Gemelo Diablo I, and Gemelo Diablo II)	
March 26, 2022-April 2, 2022	CMLL Arena Coliseo Tag Team Championship Tournament	8-team single elimination tournament	Hombre Bala Jr. and Robin	
April 8, 2022-April 29, 2022	Campeon Universal Del CMLL	two 8-man torneo cibernetico elimination matches & a 3-way elimination match, with a 3-way elimination final.	Místico	
April 19, 2022-May 31, 2022	Torneo de Escuelas	4-atomicos round-robin tournament	Huitzil, Sangre Imperial, Suicida and Valiente Jr.	
May 20, 2022-May 27, 2022	La Copa Junior	8-man single elimination tournament	Atlantis Jr.	
June 10, 2022-June 24, 2022	Copa Dinastias	8-team single elimination tournament	El Soberano Jr. and Euforia	
July 15, 2022-July 29, 2022	Leyenda de Plata	16-man single elimination tournament	Templario	
August 19, 2022	International Gran Prix	16-man torneo cibernetico elimination match	Volador Jr.	
September 2, 2022-September 16, 2022	Copa Independencia	two 8-man torneo cibernetico elimination matches, and a 3-way (Note: the second cibernetico ended in a double-DQ, so both luchadors advanced) elimination final	Ángel de Oro	
September 17, 2022	Cuadrangular Eliminatorio De Parejas Increibles	4-team single elimination Revelos Suicidas tournament	Atlantis Jr.	
October 7, 2022-October 21, 2022	CMLL Universal Amazons Championship	two torneo cibernetico elimination match (one 10-woman, one 11-woman), and a singles final	Lluvia	
October 16, 2022	CMLL World Tag Team Championship #1 Contender's Tournament	8-team single elimination tournament	Los Gemelos Diablo (Gemelo Diablo I and Gemelo Diablo II)	
October 25, 2022	Amazonas Del Mundo	16-woman torneo cibernetico elimination match	Mei Suruga	
October 28, 2022	International Women's Gran Prix	16-woman torneo cibernetico elimination match	Dalys	
November 1, 2022-November 4, 2022	Rey del Inframundo championship	10-man torneo cibernetico elimination match, and a singles final against the previous winner	Stuka Jr.	
December 9, 2022	Copa Bicentenario Varonil	4-team single elimination tournament	Místico and Rocky Romero	
December 9, 2022	Copa Bicentenario Femenil	4-team single elimination tournament	Dalys and Lady Frost	
November 15, 2022-December 13, 2022	Torneo Heredero	8-team tournament consisting of multiple 4-way elimination tag team matches, and a singles final	Atlantis and Atlantis Jr.	
November 29, 2022	Torneo Talentos Tapatios	4-way elimination tag team match	Estrella de Jalisco I & Estrella de Jalisco II	
December 16, 2022-December 23, 2022	Torneo Gran Alternativa	8-team single elimination tournament	Místico and Panterita del Ring Jr.	
January 27, 2023	Rey del Aire VIP	10-man torneo cibernetico elimination match	Dragón Rojo Jr.	
February 10, 2023-February 17, 2023	Torneo Increíble de Parejas	8-team single elimination tournament	Averno and Místico	
February 24, 2023-February 26, 2023	Interfaction Tag Team Tournament	4-team single elimination tournament	Los Guerreros de la Atlantida (Atlantis Jr. and Último Guerrero)	
February 26, 2023-March 3, 2023	Torneo de Escuelas	two 12-man torneo cibernetico elimination matches, with a 12-man torneo cibernetico final.	Team Guadalajara (Ángel Rebelde, Explosivo, Crixus, Adrenalina, Fantastico, and Vaquero Jr.)	
March 17, 2023	Copa Irma Gonzalez	14-woman torneo cibernetico elimination match	Princesa Sugehit	
March 21, 2023	Occidente Women's Tag Team Championship Tournament	10-team single elimination tournament	Stephanie Vaquer and Zeuxis	
April 1, 2023	Torneo Nueva Generación Cibernético	10-man torneo cibernetico elimination match	Rey Samuray	
April 7, 2023-April 28, 2023	CMLL Universal Championship	two 10-man torneo cibernetico elimination matches & a 3-way elimination match, with a 3-way elimination final.	Dragón Rojo Jr.	
April 30, 2023	Torneo Embajador de Los Niños Cibernético	6-man torneo cibernetico elimination match	Volcano	
May 8, 2023	Torneo Cinco de Mayo	10-man torneo cibernetico elimination match	Pegasso	
May 19, 2023-May 26, 2023	La Copa Junior VIP	8-man torneo cibernetico elimination match, and a singles final	Soberano Jr.	
June 2, 2023	Mexican National Middleweight Championship Tournament	8-man single elimination tournament	Guerrero Maya Jr.	
June 4, 2023-June 18, 2023	Copa Dinastías	8-team single elimination tournament	Místico and Dr. Karonte I	
July 21, 2023-July 28, 2023	Leyenda de Plata	8-man torneo cibernetico elimination match, and a singles final	Mascara Dorada	
July 23, 2023-July 30, 2023	Mexican National Lightweight Championship Tournament	four 8-man torneo cibernetico elimination matches, and an 8-man torneo cibernetico elimination final	Futuro	
August 18, 2023	International Gran Prix	16-man torneo cibernetico elimination match	Místico	
September 2, 2023-September 16, 2023	Copa Independencia	two 12-man torneo cibernetico elimination matches, and a singles final	Esfinge	
September 22, 2023	Torneo Cibernetico De Leyendas	12-man torneo cibernetico elimination match	Atlantis	
October 17, 2023	Torneo Cibernetico De Leyendas CMLL	12-man torneo cibernetico elimination match	Blue Panther	
October 20, 2023	CMLL Universal Amazons Championship	two 12-woman torneo cibernetico elimination matches, and a singles final	La Catalina	
October 27, 2023	International Women's Gran Prix	16-woman torneo cibernetico elimination match	Tessa Blanchard	
October 31, 2023-November 3, 2023	Rey del Inframundo	12-man torneo cibernetico elimination match, and a singles final against the previous winner	Bárbaro Cavernario	
November 19, 2023	Copa Mujeres Revolucionarias	10-woman torneo cibernetico elimination match	Reyna Isis	
November 17, 2023-November 24, 2023	Leyenda de Azul	12-man torneo cibernetico elimination match, and a singles final	Hechicero	
January 9, 2024	CMLL World Tag Team Championship Eliminator Tournament	4-team single elimination tournament	El Triangulo (El Hijo del Villano III and Villano III Jr.)	
January 16, 2024-January 23, 2024	Occidente Women's Tag Team Championship Eliminator Tournament	4-team single elimination tournament	Hatanna and Katara	
January 29, 2024	Cuadrangulo de Trios VIP	4-trios single elimination tournament	Los Bárbaros (Bárbaro Cavernario, Dragón Rojo Jr., and El Terrible)	
January 19, 2024-February 2, 2024	Torneo Gran Alternativa	16-team single elimination tournament	Místico and Brillante Jr.	
February 6, 2024	Reyes del Aire	12-man torneo cibernetico elimination match	Místico	
February 16, 2024-February 17, 2024	Interfaction Tag Team Tournament	4-team single elimination tournament	Los Guerreros Laguneros (Último Guerrero and Stuka Jr.)	
February 9, 2024-February 23, 2023	Torneo de Escuelas	two 12-man tag team elimination matches, and a 12-man tag team elimination final	Team Mexico (Alom, Astro Boy Jr., Dragon de Fuego, Forneo, Hunter, and Legendario)	
February 20, 2024	Gran Alternativa Tapatia	12-team torneo cibernetico elimination match	Arlequin and Garrabato	
February 26, 2024	Torneo de Cibernético de Amazonas	10-woman torneo cibernetico elimination match	Reyna Isis	
March 8, 2024	Copa Irma Gonzalez	12-woman torneo cibernetico elimination match	Marcela	
March 15, 2024-March 29, 2024	Torneo de Parejas Increíbles	8-team single elimination tournament	Máscara Dorada and Rocky Romero	
April 5, 2024-April 26, 2024	CMLL Universal Championship	two 10-man torneo cibernetico elimination matches & a 3-way elimination match, with a 3-way elimination final.	Máscara Dorada	
April 8, 2024	Reyes del Aire Puebla	10-man torneo cibernetico elimination match	Arkalis	
April 28, 2024	Embajador de los Ninos	6-man torneo cibernetico elimination match	Neón	
May 6, 2024	Torneo Cinco de Mayo	12-man torneo cibernetico elimination	Guerrero Maya Jr.	
May 17, 2024-May 31, 2024	La Copa Junior VIP	two 10-man torneo cibernetico elimination matches, and a singles final	Star Jr.	
June 16, 2024	Copa Dinastías	7-team single elimination tournament (with a bye earned via battle royal)	Los Stukas (Stuka Jr. and El Hijo De Stuka Jr.)	
June 25, 2024	Torneo Cibernetico Internationacional	14-man torneo cibernetico elimination match	Mistico	
July 13, 2024	Copa Fantastica	4-way match	The DKC	
July 8, 2024-July 15, 2024	CMLL Barroco Championship	10-man torneo cibernetico elimination match, and a singles final	Xelhua	
July 15, 2024	Cuadrangular de Dinastias	4-team single elimination tournament	Euforia and Soberano Jr.	
July 23, 2024	AEW International Championship Eliminator Tournament	8-man torneo cibernetico elimination match	Templario	
July 12, 2024-July 26, 2024	Leyenda de Plata	16-man single elimination tournament	Ángel de Oro	
July 30, 2024-August 6, 2024	CMLL World Women's Tag Team Championship Eliminator Tournament	8-team single elimination tournament	Tessa Blanchard and Lluvia	
August 20, 2024	Lucha De Naciones 2024	20-man torneo cibernetico elimination match	Mistico	
August 23, 2024	International Gran Prix	20-man torneo cibernetico elimination match	Claudio Castagnoli	
August 30, 2024-September 13, 2024	Copa Independencia	two 8-man torneo cibernetico elimination matches, and a singles final	Titán	
October 4, 2024-October 18, 2024	CMLL Universal Amazons Championship	two 10-woman torneo cibernetico elimination matches, and a singles final	Persephone	
October 21, 2024	Torneo Cibernetico De Amazonas	10-woman torneo cibernetico elimination match	Zeuxis	
October 25, 2024	International Women's Gran Prix	20-woman torneo cibernetico elimination match	Reyna Isis	
October 27, 2024	Torneo Cibernetico de Pequenos	16-man torneo cibernetico elimination match	Shockercito	
October 28, 2024-November 1, 2024	Rey del Inframundo	three 8-man torneo cibernetico elimination matches, and a 4-way elimination final against the previous winner	Difunto	
November 3, 2024	Copa Tzompantli de Amazonas	8-woman torneo cibernetico elimination match	La Catalina	
November 18, 2024	Copa Mujeres Revolucionarias	10-woman torneo cibernetico elimination match	Persephone	
November 22, 2024-November 29, 2024	Leyenda de Azul	10-man torneo cibernetico elimination match, and a singles final	Místico	
December 20, 2024-December 27, 2024	Torneo Gran Alternativa	8-team single elimination tournament	Templario and Legendario	
December 25, 2024-January 1, 2025	CMLL World Micro-Estrellas Championship Tournament	8-man torneo cibernetico elimination match, and a singles final	Tengu	
December 13, 2024-January 5, 2025	International Women's Cup	Four qualifying brackets (one for each promotion), and a 4-way final	Momo Watanabe	
January 5, 2025	Lucha Gauntlet	8-man torneo cibernetico elimination match	Taiji Ishimori	
February 4, 2025	Reyes del Aire	12-man torneo cibernetico elimination match	Neón	
February 22, 2025	Copa Herederos	10-man torneo cibernetico elimination match	El Hijo del Villano III	
February 22, 2025-February 26, 2025	Torneo de Facciones	4-team single elimination tournament	Los Ingobernables de Japon (Bushi and Titán)	
February 18, 2025-February 28, 2025	Torneo de Escuelas	three multi-man tag team elimination matches, and a 3-team 15-man tag team elimination final	Team CDMX (Alexius, Fury Boy, Pendulo, Poseidon, and Troyano)	
March 7, 2025-March 21, 2025	CMLL World Women's Tag Team Championship	8-team single elimination tournament	Las Chicas Indomables (La Jarochita and Lluvia)	
April 5, 2025	Copa 82 Aniversario Cibernetico	10-woman torneo cibernetico elimination match	Skadi	
April 4, 2025-April 25, 2025	CMLL Universal Championship	21-man single elimination tournament, consisting of 7 first-round matches of various types, three 3-way elimination semi-finals, and a 3-way elimination final	Titán	
April 27, 2025	Embajador de los Ninos	8-man torneo cibernetico elimination match	Futuro	
April 10, 2025	Mexican National Women's Championship #1 Contendership	6-woman torneo cibernetico elimination match	Hera	
May 5, 2025	Torneo Cinco de Mayo	12-man torneo cibernetico elimination	Atlantis Jr.	
May 23, 2025-May 30, 2025	La Copa Junior	8-man torneo cibernetico elimination match, and a singles final	Zandokan Jr.	
June 15, 2025	Copa Herederas	8-woman torneo cibernetico elimination match	Sanely	
June 15, 2025	Copa Dinastias	7-team single elimination tournament (with a bye earned via battle royal)	Guerreros de la Atlantida (Atlantis and Atlantis Jr.)	
July 7, 2025-July 21, 2025	CMLL Barroco Championship	two 10-man torneo cibernetico elimination matches, and a singles final	Blue Shark	
July 18, 2025-July 25, 2025	Leyenda de Plata	8-man single elimination tournament	Neón	
August 26, 2025	Lucha De Naciones 2025	12-man torneo cibernetico elimination match	Atlantis Jr.	
August 29, 2025	International Gran Prix	20-man torneo cibernetico elimination match	Místico	
September 5, 2025-September 19, 2025	Copa Independencia	8-team single elimination tournament	Templario and Titán	
September 30, 2025-November 4, 2025	Occidente Tag Team Championship Tournament	three 4-way tag team elimination matches (and one bye), a 4-way tag team elimination semi-final, and a tag team single elimination final	Gallo Jr. and Ráfaga Jr.	
October 3, 2025-October 17, 2025	CMLL Universal Amazons Championship	two 6-woman torneo cibernetico elimination matches, and a singles final	India Sioux	
October 19, 2025	Torneo Increibles de Amazonas	4-team single elimination tournament	Skadi and La Metálica	
October 24, 2025	International Amazons Gran Prix	18-woman torneo cibernetico elimination match	Persephone	
October 27, 2025-October 31, 2025	Rey del Inframundo	three 8-man torneo cibernetico elimination matches, and a 4-way elimination final against the previous winner	Guerrero Maya Jr.	
November 2, 2025	Copa Tzompantli de Mascaras	4-way elimination match	Stuka Jr.	
November 17, 2025	Copa Mujeres Revolucionarias	10-woman torneo cibernetico elimination match	Olympia	
November 18, 2025-November 28, 2025	Leyenda de Azul	three 5-way elimination matches, and a 3-way final	Bárbaro Cavernario	
December 12, 2025-December 19, 2025	Torneo Gran Alternativa	8-team single elimination tournament	Atlantis Jr. and Xelhua	
February 3, 2026	Reyes del Aire	12-man torneo cibernetico elimination match	Flip Gordon	
February 18, 2026-February 24, 2026	Black Cat Memorial Tournament	8-team single elimination tournament	Mistico and Mascara Dorada	
February 20, 2026-February 27, 2026	Torneo de Escuelas	12-team single elimination tournament, with a 3-way elimination final (with seeding determined via torneo cibernetico (Note: This match was billed as a "free-for-all battle royal" wherein luchadors would immediately start fighting upon entering the ring without establishing teams first, only to settle into an improvised recognizable cibernetico structure once everyone was present.))	Tornado and Rey Pegasus	
March 6, 2026	Copa Irma Gonzalez	3-way match	La Magnífica	
March 9, 2026	Reyes del Aire Puebla	8-man torneo cibernetico elimination match	Raider	
March 20, 2026	Copa Infernal	6-man torneo cibernetico elimination match	Averno	
March 20, 2026	Octagonal Infernal	8-man revés torneo cibernetico elimination match, with a Luchas de Apuestas between the final two	Max Star	
April 3, 2026-April 24, 2026	CMLL Universal Championship	a 3-way match, a 7-man torneo cibernetico elimination match, a 9-man torneo cibernetico elimination match, and a 3-way final	Mascara Dorada	
April 24, 2026	Copa 70 Aniversario de la Arena Mexico de Amazonas	8-woman torneo cibernetico elimination match	Zeuxis	
April 24, 2026	Copa 70 Aniversario de la Arena Mexico	atomicos match	Mistico, Ultimo Guerrero, Angel de Oro and Barbaro Cavernario	
April 26, 2026	Embajador de los Ninos	8-man torneo cibernetico elimination match	Fuego	
May 4, 2026	Torneo Cinco de Mayo	8-man torneo cibernetico elimination match	Esfinge	
May 22, 2026-May 29, 2026	La Copa Junior	10-man torneo cibernetico elimination match, and a singles final	Villano III Jr.	
June 14, 2026-June 21, 2026	Copa Dinastias - Hermanos	4-way tag team qualifying match, and a tag team final	Los Villanos (El Hijo del Villano III and Villano III Jr.)	
June 14, 2026-June 21, 2026	Copa Dinastias - Herederas	6-way qualifying match, and a singles final	Tessa Blanchard	
June 14, 2026-June 21, 2026	Copa Dinastias - Padres	6-way qualifying match, and a singles final	Euforia	
June 14, 2026-June 21, 2026	Copa Dinastias - Herederos	6-way qualifying match, and a singles final	Zandokan Jr.	
June 22, 2026-July 13, 2026	Arena Puebla Tag Team Championship tournament	8-team single elimination tournament	Tiger Boy and Meyer	
July 19, 2026	Mexican National Women's Championship #1 Contendership	8-woman torneo cibernetico elimination match	Thunder Rosa	
July 20, 2026	CMLL Barroco Championship	12-man torneo cibernetico elimination match	Rey Apocalipsis	
July 20, 2026	Copa Arena Puebla	4-way match	Soberano Jr.	
July 24, 2026-July 31, 2026	Leyenda de Plata	10-man torneo cibernetico elimination match, and a singles final	Mascara Dorada	
July 27, 2026	Arena Puebla Openweight Championship tournament	10-man torneo cibernetico elimination match	Prayer	
August 4, 2026	Lucha De Naciones 2026	10-man torneo cibernetico elimination match	Dulce Gardenia	
August 7, 2026	International Gran Prix	22-man torneo cibernetico elimination match	Hechicero	
August 28, 2026-September 18, 2026	CMLL World Tag Team Championship Cuadrangular Contendership Tournament	three 4-way qualifying matches, and a 4-way final against the defending champions	Angel de Oro & Niebla Roja	
September 14, 2026	Copa Viva Mexico	8-woman torneo cibernetico elimination match	Starlight Kid	
September 16, 2026	Copa Independencia	8-woman torneo cibernetico elimination match	Tessa Blanchard	
September 20, 2026	Copa Daniel Garcia	10-man torneo cibernetico elimination match	Brillante Jr.	
October 2, 2026-October 16, 2026	CMLL Universal Amazons Championship	two elimination matches, and a singles final	Olympia	
October 23, 2026	International Amazons Gran Prix	torneo cibernetico elimination match	Skadi	
October 26, 2026-October 30, 2026	Rey del Inframundo	three 6-way elimination qualifying matches, and a 4-way final against the previous winner	Xelhua	
November 1, 2026	Copa Tzompantli de Mascaras	four-way match	Persephone	
November 8, 2026	Espectacular Torneo de Tercias	4-trio single elimination tournament	Neón, Alexius & Pendulo	
November 16, 2026	Copa Mujeres Revolucionarias	10-woman torneo cibernetico elimination match	Princesa Sugehit	
November 20, 2026-November 27, 2026	Leyenda de Azul	10-man torneo cibernetico elimination match, and a singles final		

== Recurring tournaments ==
- En Busca de un Ídolo
- La Copa Junior
- Gran Alternativa
- International Gran Prix
- Leyenda de Azul
- Leyenda de Plata
- Torneo Nacional de Parejas Increíbles
- Pequeños Reyes del Aire
- Reyes del Aire
- Universal Championship
