= Former Consejo Mundial de Lucha Libre Championships =

Professional wrestling championships

Consejo Mundial de Lucha Libre (CMLL; "World Wrestling Council") is a Mexico City-based professional wrestling promotion. It was founded in 1933 and is the oldest active promotion in the world. In the company's long history it has promoted a number of professional wrestling championships as part of their shows, using various divisional, special stipulations, and weight-class championships. Over the years a total of nine CMLL championships have either been abandoned or control of the title was given to another promotion. CMLL actively promotes twelve world championships, seven national championships, and eight regional championships.

Like most lucha libre promotions, CMLL allows their wrestlers to bring championship belts to their shows even if they are not CMLL sanctioned, and have on occasion allowed those championships to be defended in CMLL shows, but they are not considered CMLL championships. As professional wrestling championship is not won or lost by actual sports competition, but by a scripted ending to a match, determined by the bookers and matchmakers. (Note: Hornbaker (2016) p. 550: "Professional wrestling is a sport in which match finishes are predetermined. Thus, win–loss records are not indicative of a wrestler's genuine success based on their legitimate abilities – but on now much, or how little they were pushed by promoters") On occasion, the promotion declares a championship vacant, which means there is no title holder at that point in time. This can either be due to a storyline, (Note: Duncan & Will (2000) p. 271, Chapter: Texas: NWA American Tag Team Title [World Class, Adkisson] "Championship held up and rematch ordered because of the interference of manager Gary Hart") or real-life issues such as a championship suffering an injury and being unable to defend the title, (Note: Duncan & Will (2000) p. 20, Chapter: (United States: 19th Century & widely defended titles – NWA, WWF, AWA, IW, ECW, NWA) NWA/WCW TV Title "Rhodes stripped on 85/10/19 for not defending the belt after having his leg broken by Ric Flair and Ole & Arn Anderson") or leaving the company. (Note: Duncan & Will (2000) p. 201, Chapter: (Memphis, Nashville) Memphis: USWA Tag Team Title "Vacant on 93/01/18 when Spike leaves the USWA.")

== Defunct championships ==
Championship	Date created	First champion(s)	End of recognition	Final recognized champion(s)	Notes	Ref(s).
Mexican National Middleweight Championship	1933	Yaqui Joe	1992	Blue Panther	Champion left to work for AAA	(Note: Duncan & Will (2000) p. 392: Mexico: National Middleweight Title [Peña])
NWA World Middleweight Championship	1939	Gus Kallio	Averno	August 12, 2012	Championship returned to the NWA	(Note: Duncan and Will (2000), pp. 389–390: Mexico: EMLL NWA World Middleweight Title [Lutteroth])
NWA World Welterweight Championship	March 15, 1946	El Santo	August 12, 2012	Mephisto	Championship returned to the NWA	(Note: Duncan and Will (2000), p. 390: Mexico: EMLL NWA World Welterweight Title [Lutteroth])
NWA World Light Heavyweight Championship	November 6, 1952	Gypsy Joe	August 12, 2012	El Texano Jr.	Championship returned to the NWA	(Note: Duncan and Will (2000), p. 389: Mexico: EMLL NWA World Light Heavyweight Title [Lutteroth])
EMLL Arena México Tag Team Championship	1966 (No later than)	El Santo and Rayo de Jalisco	September 27, 1968 (No later than)	Abandoned		
NWA Intercontinental Heavyweight Championship	1990	Pirata Morgan	September 13, 1990	El Faraón	Championship abandoned when El Faraón was fired	(Note: Duncan and Will (2000), p. 391: Mexico: NWA Intercontinental Heavyweight Title [Lutteroth])
CMLL Japan Tag Team Championship	February 24, 1999	Tsubasa and El Oriental	July 7, 1999	Masato Yakushiji and Naohiro Hoshikawa	CMLL stopped promoting tours of Japan	(Note: Duncan and Will (2000), p. 388: Japan ."CMLL Japan Tag Team Title [Lutteroth]")
CMLL Japan Super Lightweight Championship	February 27, 1999	Masatu Yakushiji	August 6, 2000	Ricky Marvin	CMLL stopped promoting tours of Japan	(Note: Duncan and Will (2000), p. 388: Japan ."CMLL Japan Super Lightweight Title [Lutteroth]")
CMLL Japan Women's Championship	October 17, 1999	Chikako Shiratori	February 13, 2000	Chikako Shiratori	CMLL stopped promoting tours of Japan	(Note: Duncan and Will (2000), p. 388: Japan ."CMLL Japan Women's Title [Lutteroth]")
Azteca Championship	December 19, 2009	Último Guerrero	May 4, 2014	Atlantis	The CMLL co-promoted shows ended	

== Mexican National Middleweight Championship (1933–1993) ==
The Mexican National Middleweight Championship, for wrestlers weighing between 87 kg (192 lb) and 97 kg (214 lb), (Note: Montiel Rojas (2991) p. 23: Capitulo XXVI del peso de los luchadores "Medio 87 kilos / Semicompleto 97 kilos" [Middle 87 kilos / Light Heavy 97 kilos]) was created in 1933 by the "Comisión de Box y Lucha Libre Mexico D.F." (Mexico City Boxing and Wrestling Commission). Yaqui Joe was the first champion and the championship was soon defended in EMLL shows as well as on the Mexican independent circuit. (Note: Duncan & Will (2000) p. 392: "Yaqui Joe 1933 ?") Over time EMLL gained almost total control of the championship as they grew to become Mexico's largest promotion at the time. In 1992, Antonio Peña founded Asistencia Asesoría y Administración (AAA), taking a number of CMLL wrestlers with him. One of these wrestlers, was the then-reigning National Middleweight Champion Octagón, who took the championship with him to AAA. (Note: Duncan & Will (2000) p. 392: "Octagon 1990/11/20 Mexico City") Blue Panther winning the championship on July 27, 1992, signaled that the commission had granted AAA control of the championship and taken it away from CMLL. (Note: Duncan & Will (2000) p. 392: "Blue Panther 1992/07/24 Leon") Afterward, CMLL created the CMLL World Middleweight Championship as the main focus of the division. (Note: Duncan & Will (2000) p. 395: Mexico: CMLL World Middleweight Title [Lutteroth])

== NWA World Middleweight Championship (1939–2010) ==
In 1939, wrestler Gus Kallio was awarded the "World Middleweight Championship" in Mexico, as recognition of Kallio's middleweight wrestling achievements in the United States. (Note: Duncan and Will (2000), p. 389: "Gus Kallio Has held the World Middleweight Title at least in three occasions since 20s; wins tournament on 30/04/09 in Columbus, OH to be recognized by the National Wrestling Association.") He lost the championship to Octavio Gaona on February 19, 1939, establishing the championship under EMLL's control. (Note: Duncan and Will (2000), p. 389: "Octavio Gaona 1939/02/13 Mexico City, MEX") In 1953, EMLL joined the National Wrestling Alliance (NWA) and the NWA officially recognized the middleweight championship as an NWA championship, renaming it to the NWA World Middleweight Championship shortly after EMLL joined the NWA. (Note: Duncan and Will (2000), p. 389: "Wins tournament; recognized by the National Wrestling Alliance after 52/09.") EMLL, and later CMLL promoted the NWA World Middleweight Championship as the highest-ranking middleweight championship, relegating the Mexican National Middleweight Championship to a secondary status. EMLL retained control of the championship and continued to use the NWA moniker after 1986. From 1994 until 2004, the championship was controlled by various Japanese promotions but returned to CMLL in September 2004. In 2010, CMLL relinquished control of the championship to the NWA and introduced the NWA World Historic Middleweight Championship as its replacement.

== NWA World Welterweight Championship (1946–2010) ==
EMLL introduced a world championship for the welterweight division, for wrestlers weighing between 77 kg (170 lb) and 87 kg (192 lb), (Note: Montiel Rojas (2991) p. 23: CAPITULO XXVI DEL PESO DE LOS LUCHADORES "Welter 77 kilos / Medio 87" [Welter 77 kilos / Middle 87 kilos]) in 1956. El Santo became the first champion on March 15, 1946, when he defeated Pete Pancof to win the championship. (Note: Duncan and Will (2000), p. 390: "El Santo 1946/03/15 Mexico City, MEX Defeats Pete Pancof in 8-man tournament final.") In 1953, EMLL joined the NWA and the NWA officially recognized the welterweight championship as an NWA championship, making it the NWA World Welterweight Championship shortly after EMLL joined the NWA. (Note: Duncan and Will (2000), p. 390: "Recognized by the National Wrestling Alliance after 52/09.") The company would continue promoting the championship until 1996, when it was brought to Japan to be one of eight titles that made up the New Japan Pro-Wrestling's J-Crown Championship. (Note: Duncan and Will (2000), p. 390: "Ōtani Shinjirō 1996/08/03 Tokyo, JPN") After the J-Crown was disbanded in late 1997, the championship remained in Japan, used by Toryumon. (Note: Duncan and Will (2000), p. 390: "Dragon Kid 1999/02/06 Nagoya, JPN Defeats Dr. Cerebro.") When Toryumon became Dragon Gate, the NWA World Welterweight Championship was taken over by Osaka Pro Wrestling. On November 27, 2007, La Sombra defeated Hajime Ohara to win the championship, bringing it back under CMLL control. In 2010 CMLL gave up control of the championship to the NWA and introduced the NWA World Historic Welterweight Championship as its replacement.

== NWA World Light Heavyweight Championship (1958–2010) ==
The NWA World Light Heavyweight Championship was created in 1951 for one of the US-based NWA territories, (Note: Duncan and Will (2000), p. 389: "Johnny Balbo 1951/12 Recognized as National Wrestling Alliance champion in Iowa; also recognized in Quad-Cities; ") but by 1958 the championship was given to EMLL after joining the NWA. (Note: Duncan and Will (2000), p. 389: "[Dixon] Defeats Al Kashey, contender appointed by the National Wrestling Association, to be recognized by the National Wrestling Alliance, with presidents from both organizations in attendance; some sources say that Kashey has been awarded on 57/11/30 in Tulsa, OK.") The title became the main championship of EMLL's light heavyweight weight division, for wrestlers weighing between 87 kg (192 lb) and 97 kg (214 lb). (Note: Montiel Rojas (2991) p. 23: CAPITULO XXVI DEL PESO DE LOS LUCHADORES "Medio 87 kilos / Semi Completo 97" [Middle 87 kilos / Light Heavy 97 kilos]) The first Mexican-based champion was Dory Dixon, who defeated Al Kashley on February 13, 1958, to win the vacant championship. (Note: Duncan and Will (2000), p. 389: "Dory Dixon 1959/02/13 Mexico City, MEX") Over the subsequent 52 years, EMLL/CMLL had 52 separate reigns, divided between a total of 38 wrestlers. In 2010 CMLL gave up control of the championship to the NWA and introduced the NWA World Historic Light Heavyweight Championship as its replacement.

== EMLL Arena México Tag Team Championship (1960s) ==
Magazines from the late-1960s occasionally refer to an EMLL Arena México Tag Team Championship being defended. It was similar to the CMLL Arena Coliseo Tag Team Championship, in that it was intended to only be defended in Arena México shows. A December 1966 source listed El Santo and Rayo de Jalisco being the champions at that point in time, having won them in the Campeonato 1964 tournament. The champions were mentioned again in the lead up to La Ola Blanca ("The White Wave"; Dr. Wagner and Ángel Blanco) winning the championship on December 2, 1967. On September 27, 1968 it was reported that El Santo and Ray Mendoza defeated La Ola Blanca to win the championship.

== NWA Intercontinental Heavyweight Championship (1990) ==
EMLL briefly promoted the "NWA Intercontinental Heavyweight Championship" in late 1990. Pirata Morgan won the championship no later than October 1990; records are unclear if Morgan won a tournament or was awarded the championship. Pirata Morgan lost the championship to El Faraón on September 13, in a show in Mexico City. The championship was abandoned when El Faraón was fired by EMLL the following month.

== CMLL Japan Women's Championship (1999–2001) ==
The CMLL Japan Women's Championship was unveiled on October 17, 1999 in a show in Osaka, Japan. Chikako Shiratori defeated Lady Apache, in a best-of-five match series to become the inaugural champion. (Note: Duncan and Will (2000), p. 388: "Chikako Shiratori 1999/10/17 Osaka Wins three out of five matches against Lady Apache to become the first champion.") Her initial reign lasted until sometime in November 1999, when La Diabólica won the title in a CMLL Japan show in Tokyo. (Note: Duncan and Will (2000), p. 388: "La Diabolica 1999/11 Tokyo, JPN") La Diabólica's reign lasted only a matter of weeks before Shiratori regained the championship on November 25, 1999, in Kyoto, Japan. (Note: Duncan and Will (2000), p. 388: "Chikako Shiratori [2] 1999/11/25 Kyoto") The CMLL Japan Women's Championship was actively defended in Japan after CMLL stopped touring. Shiratori's last documented championship defense took place on January 7, 2001, where she defeated Policewoman to retain the title. When Shiratori retired in June 2001 the CMLL Japan Women's Championship was also retired.

== CMLL Japan Super Lightweight Championship (1999–2000) ==
Starting in 1999, CMLL began to promote recurring tours of Japan under the brand "CMLL Japan" and introduced three championships to be defended exclusively in CMLL Japan shows. The CMLL Japan Super Lightweight Championship was introduced on February 27, 1999, in a show in Nagoya, Japan. The first champion was Masato Yakushiji, who defeated Rencor Latino in a match for the vacant championship. (Note: Duncan and Will (2000), p. 388: "Masato Yakushiji 1999/02/27 Nagoya, JPN – Defeats Rencor Latino to become first champion.") Over the next two years Virus and Ricky Marvin both won the championship twice. (Note: Duncan and Will (2000), p. 388: "Virus 1999/11/25 Tokyo, JPN") CMLL ended their Japanese tours by the end of 2000, abandoning the Super Lightweight Championship. The company later introduced the CMLL World Super Lightweight Championship, which used the CMLL Japan Super Lightweight Championship belt. When the weight division was adjusted to become the CMLL World Lightweight Championship, the promotion retained the original belt.

== CMLL Japan Tag Team Championship (1999–2000) ==
Along with the CMLL Japan Super Light Heavyweight Championship and the CMLL Japan Women's Championship the promotion also introduced the "CMLL Japan Tag Team Championship", exclusively for male tag teams. CMLL representative El Oriental and Japanese Tsubasa defeated Último Guerrero and Virus to become the first tag team champions. (Note: Duncan and Will (2000), p. 388: "Tsubasa & Oriental 1999/02/24 Tokyo, JPN – Defeat Ultimo Guerrero & Super Demekin to become the first champions.") Oriental and Tsubasa had no successful title defenses in the 147 days they were the champions, losing to Masato Yakushiji and Naohiro Hoshikawa in an Osaka Pro show in Aomori, Japan. (Note: Duncan and Will (2000), p. 388: "Masato Yakushiji & Naohiro Hoshikawa 1999/07/02 Aomori.") Yakushiji and Hoshikawa defended the championship twice, both in Osaka Pro shows, before the championship was abandoned in September 2000. (Note: Duncan and Will (2000), p. 388: "Vacate on 00/09/16 to concentrate on a tournament held by Osaka Pro-Wrestling.")

== Azteca Championship (2009–2014) ==
Starting in 2009, CMLL and the television channel TV Azteca Noreste held a series of shows in Monterrey, Nuevo León under the name Lucha Libre Azteca. CMLL introduced the LLA Azteca Championship as the main attraction of both the shows and TV broadcasts. The first champion was Último Guerrero who won an eight-man tournament on December 19, 2009 to claim the title. Over the following five years there were seven LLA Azteca champions, with Atlantis ending up as the last champion. Atlantis won the championship on May 4, 2014, but did not defend the championship afterward. CMLL stopped promoting the LLA shows on September 27, 2015.
