= Silueta (wrestler) =

Mexican professional wrestler

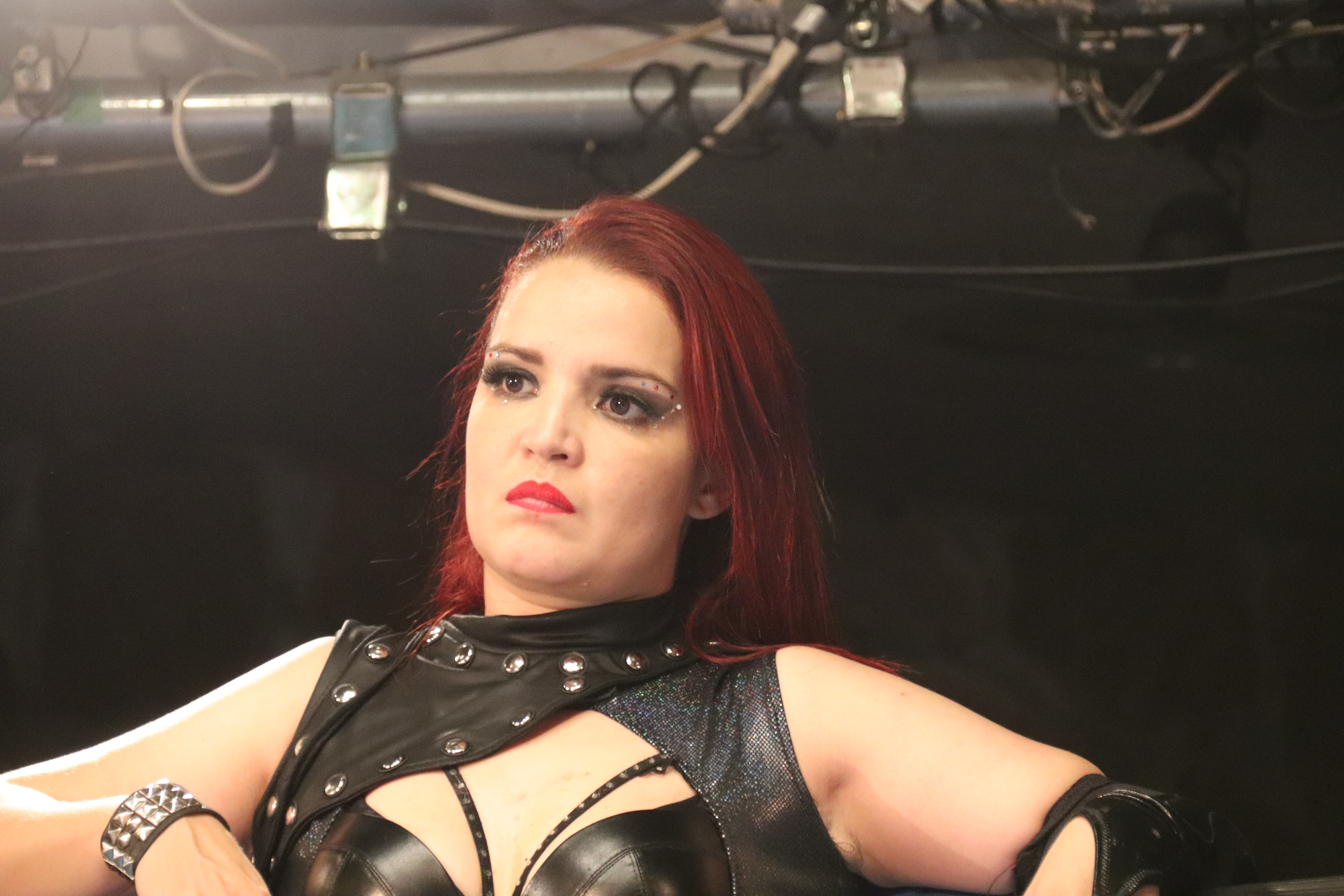
- Hernández in 2023

Personal information
- Born: Joana Guadalupe Jiménez Hernández; December 15, 1985 (age 40) Guadalajara, Jalisco, Mexico
- Children: 2

Professional wrestling career
- Ring name(s): Dark Silueta; Silueta
- Billed height: 1.60 m (5 ft 3 in)
- Billed weight: 57 kg (126 lb)
- Trained by: Pancho Gaitain; Francisco Gaitan; Máscara Mágica II; Gran Cochisse; El Satánico
- Debut: January 6, 2006

Joana Guadalupe Jiménez Hernández (born December 15, 1985) is a Mexican professional wrestler better known as Dark Silueta (Spanish for Dark "Silhouette"). She is working for the Mexican promotiom Consejo Mundial de Lucha Libre (CMLL) and Japan's Lady's Ring promotion, portraying a tecnico ("Good guy") wrestling character. She originally worked as an masked wrestler but was forced to unmask after losing a match to Zeuxis.

== Personal life ==
Jiménez was born and still resides in Guadalajara, Jalisco, Mexico. She is married and the mother of two children, her first son was born in April 2010 and a son born in 2018.

== Professional wrestling career ==
She began her training for a professional wrestling career at the age of only 13, training in the wrestling school of Francisco Gaitan. She made her professional wrestling debut in 2006 and received additional training from Consejo Mundial de Lucha Libre (CMLL) trainers Máscara Mágica II, Gran Cochisse and El Satánico She began wrestling as an enmascarada, or masked wrestler, using the ring name Silueta (Spanish for "Silhouette") and joined CMLL in 2008. CMLL decided to book Silueta in a storyline with ruda newcomer Zeuxis that developed in mid-2010. The storyline started out with the two being on opposite sides of a number of Best two out of three falls six-woman tag team matches where Zeuxis focused on trying to unmask her opponent, going so far as to rip Silueta's mask apart, causing Siluta to respond in kind. The storyline led to a Luchas de Apuestas, or "Bet match" between the two where the loser of the match would be forced to unmask and state their birth name after the loss as per Lucha Libre traditions. Zeuxis was successful, winning two of the three falls to force Silueta to unmask and reveal that her birthname was Joana Guadalupe Jiménez Hernández.

Through her work in CMLL Silueta was invited to wrestle in Japan on several occasions, primarily for Universal Woman's Pro Wrestling Reina (Reina for short). On October 11, 2011, Silueta won an eight-woman torneo cibernetico elimination match to earn a match for the CMLL-Reina International Junior Championship. The match also included Dalys la Caribeña, Goya Kong, Kiara, Lady Apache, La Seductora, Princesa Blanca and Princesa Sujei. The following week, during CMLL's show in Arena Mexico Silueta defeated Ray to become the second ever CMLL-Reina International Junior Champion. She held the title until June 4, 2013, when she lost it to Zeuxis. She regained the title from Zeuxis on August 3, 2014. After a reign of only five days, Silueta lost the title to Maki Narumiya back in Japan. On August 30, Silueta won the title for the third time by defeating Narumiya in a rematch. On June 13, 2015, Silueta announced at a Reina event that she had signed with the promotion, making Reina her second home promotion alongside CMLL. On October 9, Silueta and Syuri defeated Makoto and Rina Yamashita to win the Reina World Tag Team Championship. They relinquished the title on March 16, 2016, due to Syuri's resignation from Reina. On January 29, 2017, Silueta lost the CMLL-Reina International Junior Championship to Keira.

On November 16, 2021, Silueta won the Mexican National Women's Championship. She vacated the title on June 14, 2023. On September 17, 2023, at CMLL Lady's Ring, Silueta defeated Kohaku to win the vacant CMLL Japanese Women's Championship. She would regain the title from Lluvia on July 4, 2025. She would lose the title in her first title defense to Koguma after suffering a mid-match shoulder injury

== Championships and accomplishments ==
- Consejo Mundial de Lucha Libre
  - CMLL Japanese Women's Championship (2 times)
  - CMLL-Reina International Junior Championship (3 times)
  - Mexican National Women's Championship (1 time)
  - Occidente Women's Championship (1 time)
  - Occidente Women's Championship tournament (2021)
  - Women's Grand Prix (2021)
  - Copa Irma Gonzáles (2025)
  - Mex vs Resto de Naciones
- Universal Woman's Pro Wrestling Reina
  - Reina World Tag Team Championship (1 time) – with Syuri
- Pro Wrestling Illustrated
  - Ranked No. 38 of the top 150 female wrestlers in the PWI Female 150 in 2022

== Luchas de Apuestas record ==
Winner (wager)	Loser (wager)	Location	Event	Date	Notes
Zeuxis (mask)	Silueta (mask)	Guadalajara, Jalisco	CMLL Live event	July 18, 2010	
