= List of current champions in CMLL =

In professional wrestling, championships are competed for in pre-determined matches that arise as a result of storylines featuring a professional wrestling promotion's roster of wrestlers. As of 2024, the Mexican Lucha libre or professional wrestling promotion known as Consejo Mundial de Lucha Libre (Spanish for "World Wrestling Council"; CMLL) promotes 31 different championships; 14 championships designated as World Championships in various divisions, 9 championships on a national level and 8 championships on a regional level. (Note: All stats are fully sourced in the tables below.) The championships are divided into weight limits as well as gender specific and size-specific divisions. The professional wrestling championships are not won through legitimate athletic competition; they are instead won via scripted endings to a match or on occasion awarded to a wrestler because of a storyline.

A total of 38 wrestlers hold the 31 officially CMLL promoted championships. There are thirteen male singles championships spread out over various weight classes, four championships for tag teams, three for Trios (three-man teams), three for female competitors and three for Mini-Estrella and Micro-Estrella competitors. The oldest CMLL championship is the Mexican National Welterweight Championship, created on June 17, 1934, which is also the oldest championship in professional wrestling still active. (Note: While the National Wrestling Alliance claims that it traces the NWA World Heavyweight Championship back to 1905, the actual championship was not created until 1948.)

The titles branded as "World" level can or have been defended outside of Mexico, whereas the Mexican National championships are normally only defended in Mexico and only Mexican citizens are eligible to hold the championships, although occasional exceptions have been made. (Note: Italian born Jack O'Brien was the first to hold the Mexican National Lightweight Championship and was allowed to defend it. Later on Mishima Ota won the same championship but had it taken from him for not being Mexican born.) The regional championships are typically not promoted outside the area to which they belong, such as a specific Mexican state. The CMLL Arena Coliseo Tag Team Championship was normally defended only in Arena Coliseo until 2016 when it was defended in Japan. In the 20th century CMLL strictly enforced the weight divisions, but since around 2000 the rules have occasionally been ignored. One example of this was Mephisto holding the NWA World Welterweight Championship, a belt with a 78 kg (172 lb) upper limit, despite weighing 90 kg (200 lb). The Mexico City Boxing and Pro Wrestling Commission governs the Mexican National Championships but have granted CMLL control of the five championships listed. (Note: In this statement, "control" refers to the everyday use of the title, determining which storylines the title is being used in, who gets to challenge for the title and how to use it in a public relations sense.) The Occidente ("Western") championships are endorsed by the Jalisco state boxing and wrestling commission and promoted by CMLL's Guadalajara branch.

== World championships ==
As of November 21, 2026

=== Men's division ===
Singles

Championship	Current champion(s)	Reign	Date won	Days held	Location	Notes	Ref.
CMLL World Heavyweight Championship	Zack Sabre Jr.	1	November 16, 2026	5+	Mexico City, D.F.	Defeated Hechicero.	
CMLL World Light Heavyweight Championship	Místico	1	September 19, 2025	428	Mexico City, D.F.	Defeated Maxwell Jacob Friedman at CMLL's 92nd Anniversary Show.	
CMLL World Middleweight Championship	Templario	1	May 12, 2023	1,289	Mexico City, D.F.	Defeated Dragon Rojo Jr. at Viernes Espectacular.	
CMLL World Welterweight Championship	Titán	1	December 8, 2019	2540	Mexico City, D.F.	Defeated El Soberano at CMLL Domingos Arena Mexico.	
CMLL World Lightweight Championship	Calavera Jr. I	1	November 16, 2026	5	Puebla, Puebla	Defeated Stigma at Lunes Classico.	
CMLL World Mini-Estrellas Championship	Pequeño Volador Jr.	1	September 26, 2025	421	Mexico City, D.F.	Defeated Último Dragoncito at Super Viernes to win the title.	
CMLL World Micro-Estrellas Championship	KeMalito	1	September 26, 2025	421	Mexico City, D.F.	Defeated Tengu at Super Viernes to win the title.	
NWA World Historic Light Heavyweight Championship	Averno	1	February 26, 2026	268	Tokyo, Japan	Defeated Atlantis Jr. at Fantastica Mania: Night 6 to win the title.	
NWA World Historic Middleweight Championship	Volador Jr.	2	July 3, 2026	141	Mexico City, D.F.	Defeated Flip Gordon to win the title at Super Viernes.	
NWA World Historic Welterweight Championship	Máscara Dorada	1	December 16, 2023	1071	Mexico City, D.F.	Defeated Rocky Romero at Super Viernes Espectacular	

==== Tag team ====
Championship	Current champion(s)	Reign	Date won	Days held	Location	Notes	Ref.
CMLL World Tag Team Championship	Los Hermanos Chavez (Ángel de Oro and Niebla Roja)	1	January 23, 2022	1,763	Mexico City, D.F.	Defeated Titán and Volador Jr. at Domingos Arena Mexico.	
CMLL World Trios Championship	El Sky Team (Máscara Dorada, Místico and Neón)	1 (2, 1, 2)	May 16, 2025	554	Mexico City, D.F.	Defeated Los Infernales (Euforia, Averno and Mephisto) at Viernes Espectacular.	

=== Women's division ===
Singles

Championship	Current champion(s)	Reign	Date won	Days	Location	Notes	Ref.
CMLL World Women's Championship	Persephone	1	March 6, 2026	260	Mexico City, D.F.	Defeated Mercedes Moné at La Noche de la Amazonas.	
CMLL Japan Women's Championship	India Sioux	1	March 15, 2026	251	Tokyo, Japan	Defeated Hazuki at Stardom Cinderella Tournament 2026.	

==== Tag team ====
Championship	Current champion(s)	Reign	Date won	Days	Location	Notes	Ref.
CMLL World Women's Tag Team Championship	Lluvia and La Jarochita	1	March 21, 2025	610	Mexico City, D.F.	Defeated Taya Valkyrie and Lady Frost in a tournament final at Homenaje a Dos Leyendas to win the vacant titles. Previous champions Tessa Blanchard and Lluvia vacated the titles after Blanchard left the company.	

== National championships ==
Championship	Current Champion(s)	Held since	Reigns	Days held	Location	Notes	Ref.
Mexican National Heavyweight Championship	Esfinge	October 27, 2026	1	25+	Mexico City, Mexico	Defeated Akuma on CMLL Martes Populares.	
Mexican National Light Heavyweight Championship	Vegas Depredador	September 25, 2026	1	57+	Mexico City, Mexico	Defeated Esfinge at Noche de Campeones.	
Mexican National Middleweight Championship	Rey Pegasus	September 25, 2026	1	57+	Mexico City, Mexico	Defeated Guerrero Maya Jr. at Noche de Campeones.	
Mexican National Welterweight Championship	Capitán Suicida	March 31, 2026	1	235+	Mexico City, Mexico	Defeated Magia Blanca on Martes Populares.	
Mexican National Lightweight Championship	vacant	November 18, 2026	-	3+	CMLL Informa	Calavera Jr. I won the CMLL World Lightweight Championship on November 16.	
Mexican National Tag Team Championship	Los Depredadores (Rugido and Magnus)	July 9, 2023	1	1,231+	Mexico City, Mexico	Defeated La Fuerza Tapatia (Esfinge and Fugaz) on Domingo Familiar.	
Mexican National Trios Championship	Los Herederos (Felino Jr., Hijo de Stuka Jr., and El Cobarde)	June 16, 2025	1	523+	Puebla, Puebla	Defeated Los Viajeros del Espacio (Futuro, Hombre Bala Jr., and Max Star) on Lunes Clasico.	
Mexican National Women's Championship	Thunder Rosa	July 31, 2026	1	113+	Mexico City, Mexico	Defeated India Sioux on Viernes Espectacular.	
Mexican National Women's Tag Team Championship	Las Valientitas (Olympia and Hera)	September 25, 2026	1	57+	Mexico City, Mexico	Defeated Kira and Skadi at Noche de Campeones.	

== Regional championships ==
Championship	Current Champion(s)	Held since	Reigns	Days held	Location	Notes	Ref.
CMLL Arena Coliseo Tag Team Championship	Los Hermanos Calavera (Calavera Jr. I and Calavera Jr. II)	April 4, 2026	1	231+	Mexico City, Mexico	Defeated Los Villanos (El Hijo del Villano III and Villano III Jr.) at CMLL 83. Aniversario Arena Coliseo.	
CMLL Arena Puebla Tag Team Championship	Meyer and Tiger Boy	July 13, 2026	1	131+	Zaragoza, Puebla	Defeated Rey Espartano and Konjuro in a tournament final on Lunes Clásico to become the inaugural champions.	
CMLL Arena Puebla Openweight Championship	Prayer	July 27, 2026	1	117+	Zaragoza, Puebla	Defeated Meyer, Centella Roja, Millenium, Tiger Boy, Astro, Konjuro, Rey Espartano, Hijo del Perverso, and Malayo in a torneo on Lunes Clásico to become the inaugural champion.	
Occidente Heavyweight Championship	Bestia Negra	March 1, 2022	1	1,726+	Guadalajara, Jalisco	Defeated Exterminador 2–1 in a two-out-of-three falls match on Martes de Glamour.	
Occidente Middleweight Championship	Zandokan Jr.	February 22, 2022	1	1,733+	Guadalajara, Jalisco	Defeated Principe Daniel 2–1 in a two-out-of-three falls match on Martes de Glamour.	
Occidente Tag Team Championship	Ráfaga Jr. and Gallo Jr.	November 4, 2025	1	382+	Guadalajara, Jalisco	Defeated Black Warrior Jr. and Prince Drago in a tournament final on Martes de Glamour.	
Occidente Trios Championship	Ráfaga, Guerrero de la Muerte, and Furia Roja	May 20, 2025	1	550+	Guadalajara, Jalisco	Defeated Difunto, Crixus, and Raider 2–1 in a two-out-of-three falls match on Martes de Glamour.	
Occidente Women's Championship	Lluvia	April 23, 2024	1	942+	Guadalajara, Jalisco	Defeated Dark Silueta on Martes de Glamour.	
Occidente Women's Tag Team Championship	Las Infernales (Dark Silueta and Zeuxis)	January 7, 2025	1	683+	Guadalajara, Jalisco	Defeated Las Chicas Indomables (Lluvia and La Jarochita) on Martes de Glamour to win the vacant title. Previous champions Adira and Naútica vacated the title after Adira left CMLL.	
