= Juan Díaz =

Juan Díaz may refer to:

== Arts and entertainment ==
- Juan Díaz Covarrubias (1837–1859), Mexican novelist and poet
- Juan Díaz Canales (born 1972), Spanish comics artist
- Juan Díaz Pardeiro (born 1976), Spanish actor

== Sports ==
=== Association football (soccer) ===
- Juan García Díaz (1940–2013), Spanish footballer
- Juan Américo Díaz (1944–2013), Bolivian footballer
- Juan Díaz Sánchez (1948–2013), Spanish association football player
- Juan Díaz (footballer, born 1977) (Juan Díaz Prendes, born 1977), Spanish association football player
- Juan Alberto Díaz (born 1985), Salvadoran footballer
- Juan David Díaz (born 1987), Colombian footballer
- Juan Manuel Díaz (born 1987), Uruguayan football (soccer) player
- Juan Ignacio Díaz (born 1998), Argentine footballer

=== Boxing ===
- Juan Díaz (Chilean boxer) (born 1935), Chilean boxer
- Juan Antonio Díaz (born 1961), Argentine boxer
- Juan Díaz (boxer) (born 1983), Mexican-American boxer

=== Other sports ===
- Juan Díaz (first baseman) (born 1974), Cuban baseball player
- Juan Díaz (taekwondo) (born 1981), Venezuelan taekwondo practitioner
- Juan Díaz (shortstop) (born 1988), Dominican baseball player
- Juan Díaz (fighter) (born 1998), Peruvian mixed martial arts fighter

== Others ==
- Juan Díaz de Solís (1470–1516), Spanish navigator
- Juan Díaz (conquistador) (1480–1549), Spanish conquistador
- Juan Díaz (friar) (died 1651), Salvadoran friar
- Juan Arias Díaz (fl. 1710s), Spanish explorer and prospector

== Other uses ==
- Juan Díaz, Coclé, Panamanian geographical area
- Juan Díaz, Panama City, Panama geographical area
