= LLA Azteca Championship =

Former professional wrestling championship

- The belt that represented the LLA Azteca Championship

Details
- Promotion: Consejo Mundial de Lucha Libre; Lucha Libre Azteca
- Date established: December 19, 2009
- Date retired: May 4, 2014
Statistics
- First champion: Último Guerrero
- Final champion: Atlantis
- Most reigns: Último Guerrero/Atlantis (2 reigns)
- Longest reign: Último Guerrero (234 days)
- Shortest reign: Héctor Garza (124 days)
- Oldest champion: Atlantis (51 years, 218 days) (Note: See notes section for further details)
- Youngest champion: Místico (20–21 years)
- Heaviest champion: Héctor Garza/La Sombra 95 kg (209 lb)
- Lightest champion: Místico 76 kg (168 lb)

The LLA Azteca Championship (Campeonato Azteca de LLA in Spanish) was a professional wrestling championship promoted by Consejo Mundial de Lucha Libre (CMLL) and Lucha Libre Azteca (LLA) between 2009 and 2014. This championship had no weight limit nor any other limits on who could become champion. It was sponsored by TV Azteca Noreste, who televised all championship matches and covered professional wrestling in Monterrey, Nuevo León on a weekly basis. The Championship was last seen on May 4, 2014 and was not promoted by LLA between that date and LLA's last show on September 27, 2015.

No champion was able to successfully defend the championship as it changed hands each time LLA and CMLL promoted a title match. As a professional wrestling championship, it was not won through athletic competition; it was instead won and lost via a scripted ending to a match. The championship was vacated on May 2, 2013, after a match between then-champion Místico and challengers La Sombra and Volador Jr. ended in a time limit draw and the title was vacated.

The championship was created in late 2009 as CMLL announced a one-night tournament to determine the first Azteca champion. The longest reigning champion was Último Guerrero who held the title for 234 days from December 19, 2009, to August 10, 2010. The youngest champion was Místico, who was born in 1991 and won the title in September 2012 making him 20 or 21 years old at the time. The shortest reigning champion was Héctor Garza who held the title for 124 days from August 10, 2010, to December 12, 2010. Último Guerrero holds the record for most reigns, the only person to win it twice.

== Background ==
Lucha libre, (professional wrestling) is a form of entertainment where matches are presented as being competitive, but their outcomes are pre-determined by promoters. As part of presenting lucha libre as a genuine combat sport, promoters create championships that are used in the storylines presented on their shows; they are not won as result of genuinely competitive matches. The championship is represented by a belt for the champion to wear before or after a match.

In 2009, Mexican professional wrestling promotion Consejo Mundial de Lucha Libre ("World Wrestling Council"; CMLL) began working with the Monterrey, Nuevo León local promotion "Lucha Libre Azteca" (LLA), allowing wrestlers under CMLL contracts to work LLA shows. In 2009 LLA and CMLL decided to create the "Azteca Championship" as the centerpiece of their shows.

== History ==
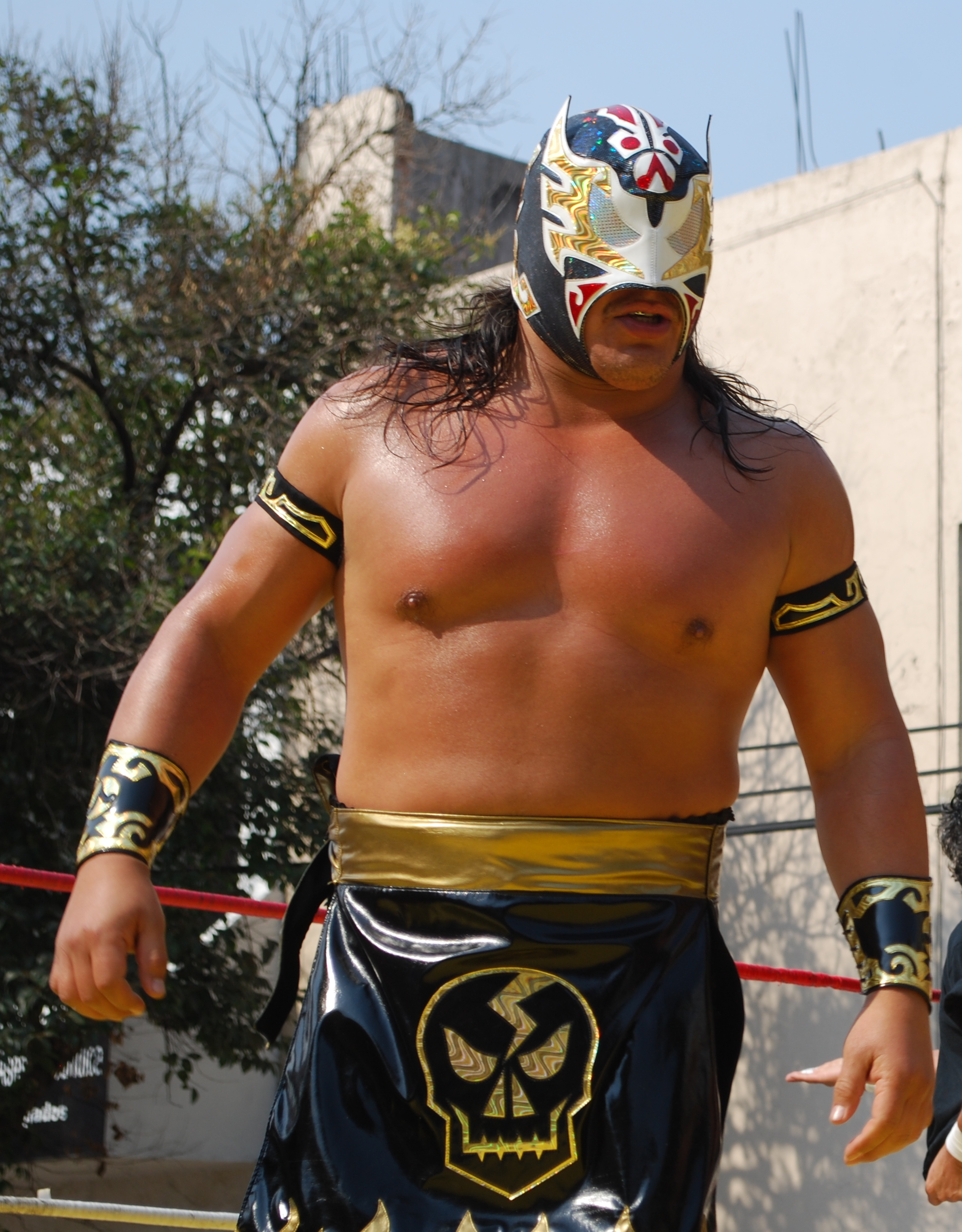
Último Guerrero, the inaugural champion

The Azteca Championship was created in late 2009 as a one-night tournament to determine the first Azteca champion on December 18. The tournament started out with two six-man tag team matches to reduce the field from 12 to 6 wrestler. Héctor Garza, Místico and Shocker defeated La Peste Negra (Negro Casas, El Felino and Mr. Niebla) while Los Guerreros de la Atlantida (Atlantis, Rey Bucanero and Último Guerrero) defeated Los Hijos del Averno (Averno, Ephesto and Mephisto) to advance to the semi-finals. The semi-final event was a torneo cibernetico elimination match that saw Atlantis and Último Guerrero as the final two survivors. In the end, Último Guerrero pinned his tag team partner Averno to become the first LLA Azteca Champion.

All championship matches except for the tournament to determine the first champion was held under "Three-way" rules, with three wrestlers in the ring concurrently. No champion was able to successfully defend the championship as it changed hands each time LLA promoted a title match at Gimnasio Nuevo León or Arena Solidaridad. As a professional wrestling championship, it was not won through athletic competition; it was instead won and lost via a scripted ending to a match. The championship was vacated on May 2, 2013, after a match between then-champion Místico and challengers La Sombra and Volador Jr. ended in a time limit draw. LLA held a match for the vacant championship over a year later, on May 4, 2014, where Atlantis defeated Último Guerrero by disqualification to win the championship for a second time. The championship was not promoted on any subsequent LLA shows, with LLA holding its last event on September 29, 2015, rendering it inactive after Atlantis won it.

The longest reigning champion was Último Guerrero who held the title for 234 days from December 19, 2009, to August 10, 2010. The youngest champion was Místico, who was born in 1991 and won the title in September 2012 making him 20 or 21 years old at the time. The shortest reigning champion was Héctor Garza who held the title for 124 days from August 10, 2010, to December 12, 2010. Último Guerrero and Atlantis are the only wrestlers to win the championship twice. (Note: The Championship table below holds all relevant references.) The oldest champion was Atlantis who won at the age of 48 years and 75 days. The last champions was Místico, who defeated Atlantis and Último Guerrero for the championship on September 30, 2012, in Monterrey, Nuevo León.

== Reigns ==
Key
No.	Overall reign number
Reign	Reign number for the specific champion
Days	Number of days held

No.	Champion	Championship change			Reign statistics		Notes	Ref.
No.	Champion	Date	Event	Location	Reign	Days	Notes	Ref.
1	Último Guerrero	December 19, 2009	LLA Live event	Monterrey, Nuevo León	1	234	Último Guerrero defeated Atlantis in the finals of an eight-man tournament to become the inaugural champion.	
2	Héctor Garza	August 10, 2010	Supremacía Azteca (Note: Spanish for "Aztec Supremacy")	Monterrey, Nuevo León	1	124	Héctor Garza defeated Místico and Último Guerrero in a three-way match to win the championship.	
3	Atlantis	December 12, 2010	El Reto Final (Note: Spanish for "The Final Challenge")	Monterrey, Nuevo León	1	133	Atlantis defeated Blue Panther and champion Héctor Garza in a three-way match to win the championship.	
4	La Sombra	April 24, 2011	LLA Live event	Monterrey, Nuevo León	1	154	La Sombra defeated champion Atlantis and Volador Jr. in a three-way match to win the championship.	
5	Volador Jr.	September 25, 2011	LLA Live event	Monterrey, Nuevo León	1	210	Volador Jr. defeated La Máscara and champion La Sombra in a three-way match to win the championship.	
6	Último Guerrero	April 22, 2012	Live event	Monterrey, Nuevo León	2	161	Último Guerrero defeated Máscara Dorada and champion Volador Jr. in a three-way match to win the championship.	
7	Místico	September 30, 2012	LLA Live event	Monterrey, Nuevo León	1	224	Místico II defeated Atlantis and champion Último Guerrero in a three-way match to win the championship.	
—	Vacated	May 12, 2013	LLA Live event	Monterrey, Nuevo León	—	—	Vacated after a 30-minute time limit draw between champion Místico, La Sombra and Volador Jr.	
8	Atlantis	May 4, 2014	LLA Live event	Monterrey, Nuevo León	2	0	Defeated Último Guerrero by disqualification to win the championship.	
—	Deactivated	May 4, 2014	—	—	—	—	Championship not promoted since that date. LLA held last show on September 27, 2015	

== Combined reigns ==
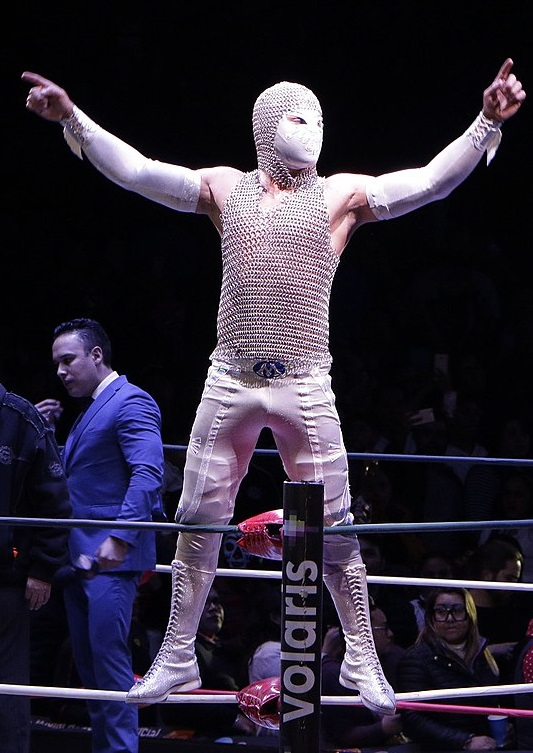
Místico, the youngest Azteca Champion

Rank	Wrestler	No. of reigns	Combined days
1	Último Guerrero	2	395
2	Místico	1	224
3	Volador Jr.	1	210
4	La Sombra	1	154
5	Atlantis	2	133
6	Héctor Garza	1	124

== Notes ==
Champion weight, lightest to heaviest

- Místico: 76 kg (168 lb)
- Atlantis: 82 kg (181 lb)
- Volador Jr.: 87 kg (192 lb)
- Último Guerrero: 93 kg (205 lb)
- Héctor Garza: 95 kg (209 lb)
- La Sombra 95 kg (209 lb)

Champion age at title win, youngest to oldest

- Místico: 20–21 years
- La Sombra: 21 years, 172 days
- Volador Jr.: 30 years, 242 days
- Último Guerrero 37 years, 293 days
- Último Guerrero (2) 40 years, 52 days
- Héctor Garza 41 years, 59 days
- Atlantis 48 years, 75 days
- Atlantis (2) 51 years, 218 days
