= NWA World Historic Light Heavyweight Championship =

American professional wrestling championship

- The belt design of all three NWA Historic championships

Details
- Promotion: Consejo Mundial de Lucha Libre
- Date established: August 12, 2010
- Current champion: Averno
- Date won: February 26, 2026

Other name
- CMLL Historic Light Heavyweight Championship
Statistics
- First champion: El Texano Jr.
- Most reigns: Rey Bucanero (2 reigns)
- Longest reign: Stuka Jr. (4 years, 174 days)
- Shortest reign: El Texano Jr. (124 days)
- Oldest champion: Averno (48 years, 354 days)
- Youngest champion: Atlantis Jr. (24–25)
- Heaviest champion: Shocker (103 kg (227 lb))
- Lightest champion: Averno (79 kg (174 lb))

The World Historic Light Heavyweight Championship, also known as the NWA World Historic Light Heavyweight Championship (Campeonato Mundial Historico de Peso Semicompleto de la NWA in Spanish), is a professional wrestling championship promoted by Consejo Mundial de Lucha Libre (CMLL). CMLL had held the NWA World Light Heavyweight Championship for over 48 years, when the relationship between the promotion and National Wrestling Alliance broke down in March 2010. Blue Demon Jr., the president of NWA Mexico, sent letters to CMLL, telling them to stop promoting the NWA-branded championships since they were no longer part of the NWA. On August 12, 2010, CMLL debuted the new NWA World Historic Light Heavyweight Championship belt and named El Texano Jr., the final CMLL-recognized NWA World Light Heavyweight Champion, as the inaugural champion. All title matches in CMLL take place under best two-out-of-three falls rules.

The current champion is Averno, who is in his first reign. He won the title by defeating Atlantis Jr. at Fantastica Mania: Night 6 in Tokyo, Japan, on February 26, 2026.

== Background ==
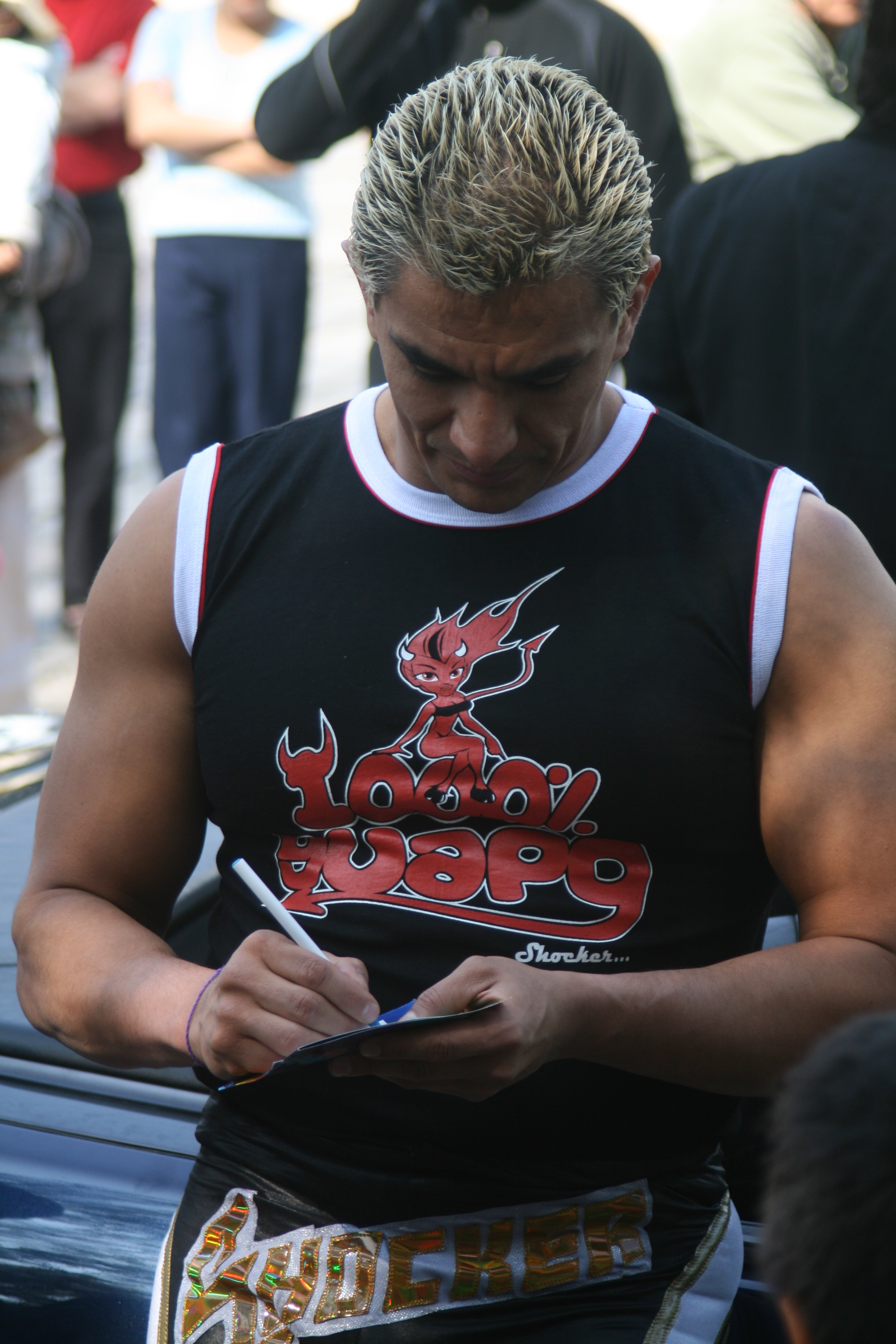
Shocker, the second NWA World Historic Light Heavyweight Champion

The first light heavyweight division professional wrestling championship recognized in Mexico was the Mexican National Light Heavyweight Championship, created in 1942, sanctioned by the Mexico City boxing and wrestling commission and promoted by a number of different Mexican professional wrestling promotions including Empresa Mexicana de Lucha Libre (EMLL; Spanish for "Mexican Wrestling Enterprise"). In 1953, EMLL joined the National Wrestling Alliance (NWA), and in 1957 EMLL was given control of the NWA World Light Heavyweight Championship after it had been inactive for around four years. From 1957 on the championship was defended primarily in Mexico on EMLL shows and occasionally in Southern California during the 1970s.

In the late 1980s, EMLL left the NWA to avoid the politics of that organization. While they left the NWA they did retain control of the NWA World Light Heavyweight Championship as their main championship of the light heavyweight division, as well as promoting the Mexican National Light Heavyweight Championship as the secondary championship. In 1991, EMLL was renamed "Consejo Mundial de Lucha Libre" (CMLL; "World Wrestling Council") after which they began to introduce a series of "CMLL" branded world championships. On September 26, 1991, CMLL determined the first ever holder of the CMLL World Light Heavyweight Championship as Jerry Estrada defeated Pierroth Jr. in the finals of a tournament.

In 2010, the NWA, represented by NWA Mexico president Blue Demon Jr., reached out to CMLL and asked them to stop using the NWA-branded championships since they were not part of the NWA. Blue Demon Jr. was in the process of establishing NWA Mexico as a promotion and wanted to use the championship. There had been previous attempts by the NWA to gain back control of the three NWA-branded championships that CMLL used, the light heavyweight championship as well as the NWA World Welterweight Championship and the NWA World Middleweight Championship, but in those instances, CMLL had not responded to those requests at all. The promotion did not directly respond to the latest claim; the NWA Welterweight Champion, Mephisto, commented instead, simply stating that the championships belonged to CMLL. Finally, on August 12, 2010, CMLL debuted the new NWA World Historic Light Heavyweight Championship belt and named El Texano Jr., the final CMLL-recognized NWA World Light Heavyweight Champion, as the inaugural champion. The championship was initially announced as the CMLL Historic Light Heavyweight Championship, but when the belt was unveiled, it was called the "NWA World Historic Light Heavyweight Championship" (Campeonato Mundial Historico de Peso Semicompleto de la NWA in Spanish)

== Rules ==
The official definition by the Mexican lucha libre commission for the light heavyweight division in Mexico is between 92 kg (203 lb) and 97 kg (214 lb). In the 20th century CMLL were generally consistent and strict about enforcing the actual weight limits. However, in the 21st century the official definitions have at times been overlooked for certain champions. One example of this was when Mephisto, officially listed as 90 kg (200 lb), won the CMLL World Welterweight Championship, a weight class with a 78 kg (172 lb) upper limit. While the heavyweight championship is traditionally considered the most prestigious weight division in professional wrestling, CMLL places more emphasis on the lower weight divisions, often promoting those ahead of the CMLL World Heavyweight Championship.

Up until late 2021,[13] championship matches promoted in Mexico usually took place under best two-out-of-three falls rules.[6] On occasion single fall title matches took place, especially when promoting CMLL title matches in Japan, conforming to the traditions of the local promotion.[a]

== Tournaments ==
=== 2011 ===
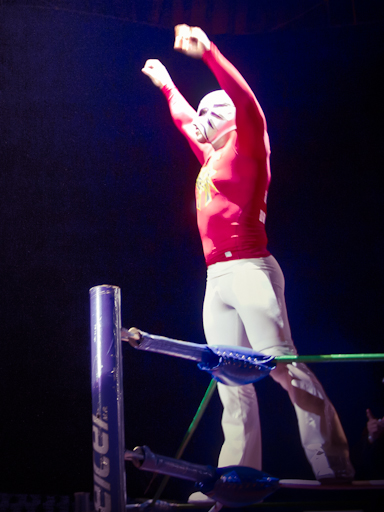
La Máscara, one of 16 tournament competitors in the 2011 tournament.

In May 2011 CMLL declared the NWA World Light Heavyweight Championship vacant when the then reigning champion Shocker had to undergo knee surgery after suffering an injury and thus would be unable to defend the championship for an undetermined amount of time. CMLL decided to hold a tournament to determine the next champion, splitting the 16 man group of competitors into two groups, each of which would compete in a torneo cibernetico elimination match to find a finalist. After the two torneo cibernetico matches the two winners would face off the following week in a one-on-one best two-out-of-three falls match. Block A of the tournament took place on June 7, 2011, and saw El Hijo del Fantasma win, while Block B took place a week later on June 14 and had Rey Bucanero as the victor. The following week, on June 21, Rey Bucanero defeated El Hijo del Fantasma to become the third ever NWA World Historic Light Heavyweight Champion. Bucanero became the first champion to have not also held the previous NWA World Light Heavyweight Championship.

Block A Cibernetico

#	Eliminated	Eliminated by
1	Ephesto	Toscano
2	Metro	Olímpico
3	Toscano	Psicosis
4	Olímpico	La Máscara
5	La Máscara	Psicosis (Double DQ)
6	Psicosis	La Máscara (Double DQ)
7	Mr. Águila	El Hijo del Fantasma
8	El Hijo del Fantasma	Winner

Block B Cibernetico

#	Eliminated	Eliminated by
1	El Sagrado	El Felino
2	El Felino	La Sombra
3	El Texano Jr.	La Sombra
4	Máximo	Atlantis
5	Blue Panther	Rey Bucanero
6	Atlantis	La Sombra
7	La Sombra	Rey Bucanero
8	Rey Bucanero	Winner

=== 2015 ===
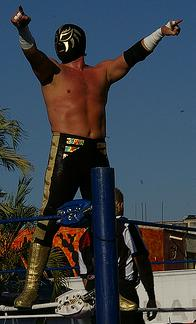
La Sombra, finalist in 2015 tournament.

Due to the championship being vacated on February 23, 2015, CMLL held a tournament for the vacant light heavyweight championship starting March 1, 2015. La Sombra and Rey Bucanero outlasted Atlantis, Blue Panther, Dragón Rojo Jr., Ephesto, Misterioso Jr., Mr. Águila, Niebla Roja, Stuka Jr., Valiente and Último Guerrero in a 12-man torneo cibernetico elimination match. On March 8, Bucanero defeated La Sombra to win the tournament and the vacant championship.

2015 Torneo Cibernetico

#	Eliminated	Eliminated by
1	Misterioso Jr.	Dragón Rojo Jr.
2	Stuka Jr.	Ephesto
3	Dragón Rojo Jr.	Mr. Águila
4	Niebla Roja	Blue Panther
5	Ephesto	Valiente
6	Mr. Águila	La Sombra
7	Blue Panther	Último Guerrero
8	Valiente	Rey Bucanero
9	Último Guerrero	Double DQ - Mask pull
10	Atlantis	Double DQ - Low blow
11	La Sombra and Rey Bucanero	Winners

== Reigns ==
The current champion is Averno, who is in his first reign. He won the title by defeating Atlantis Jr. at Fantastica Mania: Night 6 in Tokyo, Japan, on February 26, 2026. He is the ninth overall champion and the sixth individual to hold the title. Rey Bucanero is the only wrestler to have won the championship on two occasions and also holds the distinction of holding the record for the longest reign as his first reign with the championship lasted 714 days in total. The first champion, El Texano Jr., held the title for the shortest reign between August and December 2010, a total of 124 days. The championship has been vacated twice, first in 2011 when then-champion Shocker suffered a knee injury and was forced to give up the championship. In early 2015, CMLL vacated the championship once more, this time because champion Diamante Azul had not appeared at CMLL shows for several months. Current champion Hechicero was the first champion to defend the championship at a non-CMLL event as he defeated Caifan on November 27, 2016, in the main event of Lucha Memes Chairo 6 in Naucalpan, State of Mexico. Of all the champions El Texano Jr. and Shocker are the only champions to never have a successful championship defense. Hechicero's 641-day reign from 2016 to 2018 saw Hechicero successfully defend the championship six times, the most of any champion.

Key
No.	Overall reign number
Reign	Reign number for the specific champion
Days	Number of days held
+	Current reign is changing daily

No.	Champion	Championship change			Reign statistics		Notes	Ref.
No.	Champion	Date	Event	Location	Reign	Days	Notes	Ref.
Consejo Mundial de Lucha Libre (CMLL)
1	El Texano Jr.	August 12, 2010	Press conference at Arena México	Mexico City, Mexico	1	124	El Texano Jr. was the final CMLL-recognized NWA World Light Heavyweight Champion and was thus named the first NWA World Historic Light Heavyweight Champion.	
2	Shocker	December 14, 2010	CMLL Lucha Libre on CadenaTres	Mexico City, Mexico	1	163		
—	Vacated	May 26, 2011	—	—	—	—	The championship was vacated when Shocker was unable to defend it due to undergoing a knee surgery.	
3	Rey Bucanero	June 21, 2011	CMLL Lucha Libre on CadenaTres	Mexico City, Mexico	1	714	Defeated El Hijo del Fantasma in the finals of a tournament to win the vacant championship.	
4	Diamante Azul	June 4, 2013	CMLL Lucha Libre on CadenaTres	Mexico City, Mexico	1	629		
—	Vacated	February 23, 2015	—	—	—	—	The championship was vacated due to Diamante Azul not working for CMLL for several months prior.	
5	Rey Bucanero	March 8, 2015	Titanes del Ring	Mexico City, Mexico	2	605	Defeated La Sombra in a tournament final to win the vacant championship.	
6	Hechicero	November 2, 2016	Dia de Muertos 2016	Mexico City, Mexico	1	650		
7	Stuka Jr.	August 14, 2018	CMLL Martes de Area Mexico	Mexico City, Mexico	1	1,635		
8	Atlantis Jr.	February 4, 2023	CMLL Martes de Area Mexico	Mexico City, Mexico	1	1,118		
9	Averno	February 26, 2026	Fantastica Mania: Night 6	Tokyo, Japan	1	265+		

== Combined reigns ==
As of October 8, 2026.

†	Indicates the current champion

Rank	Wrestler	No. of reigns	Combined days	Ref(s).
1	Stuka Jr.	1	1,635	
2	Rey Bucanero	2	1,319	
3	Atlantis Jr.	1	1,118	
4	Hechicero	1	650	
5	Diamante Azul	1	629	
6	Averno †	1	265+	
7	Shocker	1	163	
8	El Texano Jr.	1	124	
