= 2016 in professional wrestling =

2016 in professional wrestling describes the year's events in the world of professional wrestling.

== List of notable promotions ==
These promotions held notable events in 2016.

Promotion Name	Abbreviation	Notes
Consejo Mundial de Lucha Libre	CMLL	
DDT Pro-Wrestling	DDT	
Lucha Libre AAA Worldwide	AAA	The "AAA" abbreviation has been used since the mid-1990s and had previously stood for the promotion's original name Asistencia Asesoría y Administración.
New Japan Pro-Wrestling	NJPW	
Pro Wrestling Guerrilla	PWG	
Revolution Pro Wrestling	RevPro	
Ring of Honor	ROH	
Total Nonstop Action Wrestling	TNA	
World Wrestling Council	WWC	
WWE	—	WWE stands for World Wrestling Entertainment, which is still the legal name, but the company ceased using the full name in April 2011, with the WWE abbreviation becoming an orphaned initialism. In July, WWE reintroduced the brand split, where it divided its main roster into two storyline divisions, Raw and SmackDown, referred to as brands where wrestlers exclusively performed on their respective weekly television programs. NXT served as WWE's developmental territory.

== Calendar of notable shows ==
=== January ===
Date	Promotion(s)	Event	Location	Main event	Notes
1	CMLL	Sin Piedad	Mexico City	Negro Casas defeated Super Parka in a two out of three falls hair vs. hair match	
4	TJPW	Tokyo Joshi Pro '16	Tokyo	Miyu Yamashita defeated Shoko Nakajima to become the inaugural Princess of Princess Champion	This was the inaugural pay-per-view produced by Tokyo Joshi Pro-Wrestling.
4	NJPW	Wrestle Kingdom 10	Tokyo	Kazuchika Okada (c) defeated Hiroshi Tanahashi to retain the IWGP Heavyweight Championship	
5–7	TNA	One Night Only: Rivals	Bethlehem, Pennsylvania	Mr. Anderson vs. Bram	
7–9; 30–31	TNA	One Night Only: Joker's Wild	Bethlehem, Pennsylvania; London, England; Birmingham, England	14-person intergender Joker's Wild gauntlet battle royal	
8	TNA	One Night Only: Live!	Bethlehem, Pennsylvania	Eric Young and Bram vs. Beer Money, Inc. (Bobby Roode and James Storm)	
9	WWC	Euphoria	Bayamon, Puerto Rico	Mr. 450 Hammett (c) defeated Carlito in a Tables, Ladders and Chairs match for the WWC Universal Heavyweight Championship	
22	AAA	Guerra de Titanes	Zapopan	El Mesías & El Texano Jr. defeated Dr. Wagner Jr. & Psycho Clown in the semi-final of the AAA Mega Championship tournament	
22	CMLL; NJPW	Fantastica Mania (Tokyo shows)	Tokyo	Mephisto & Último Guerrero defeated Místico & Volador Jr. in a tag team match	
23	CMLL; NJPW	Fantastica Mania (Tokyo shows)	Tokyo	Kazuchika Okada, Mephisto & Último Guerrero defeated Hiroshi Tanahashi, Místico & Volador Jr. in a 6-man tag match	
24	CMLL; NJPW	Fantastica Mania (Tokyo shows)	Tokyo	Volador Jr. (c) defeated Mephisto to retain the NWA World Historic Welterweight Championship	
24	WWE	Royal Rumble	Orlando, FL	Triple H won the 30-man Royal Rumble match by last eliminating Dean Ambrose to win the WWE World Heavyweight Championship, which Roman Reigns, who entered at number one, was defending in the match; Triple H eliminated Reigns before lastly eliminating Ambrose	First time one of WWE's world championships was defended in the Royal Rumble match, which traditionally awards the winner a match for a world championship at WrestleMania.
(c) – denotes defending champion(s)

=== February ===
Date	Promotion(s)	Event	Location	Main event
11	NJPW	The New Beginning in Osaka	Osaka	Kazuchika Okada (c) defeated Hirooki Goto to retain the IWGP Heavyweight Championship
14	NJPW	The New Beginning in Niigata	Nagaoka	Kenny Omega defeated Hiroshi Tanahashi to win the vacant IWGP Intercontinental Championship
19	ROH; NJPW	Honor Rising: Japan	Tokyo	Tomohiro Ishii defeated Roderick Strong (c) to win the ROH World Television Championship
20	ROH; NJPW	Honor Rising: Japan	Tokyo	Jay Lethal (c) defeated Tomoaki Honma to retain the ROH World Championship
21	WWE	Fastlane	Cleveland, OH	Roman Reigns defeated Brock Lesnar and Dean Ambrose in a triple threat match to become the number one contender for the WWE World Heavyweight Championship at WrestleMania 32
25	NJPW	Lion's Gate Project 1	Tokyo, Japan	Yuji Nagata defeated Mitsuhiro Kitamiya in a Singles match
26	ROH	14th Anniversary Show	Las Vegas, NV	Jay Lethal (c) defeated Adam Cole and Kyle O'Reilly to retain the ROH World Championship
28	DDT	Into The Fight 2016	Tokyo, Japan	Harashima defeated Shigehiro Irie to determine the No. 1 contender to the KO-D Openweight Championship
(c) – denotes defending champion(s)

=== March ===
Date	Promotion(s)	Event	Location	Main event
12	WWE	Roadblock	Toronto	Triple H (c) defeated Dean Ambrose to retain the WWE World Heavyweight Championship
12	NJPW	New Japan Cup Final	Aomori	Tetsuya Naito defeated Hirooki Goto in the tournament final to win the 2016
17	TNA	One Night Only: Knockouts Knockdown	Orlando, Florida	Knockouts Gauntlet match to crown the "Queen of the Knockouts"
17–19	TNA	One Night Only: Victory Road	Orlando, Florida	Ethan Carter III vs. Eli Drake
18	CMLL	Homenaje a Dos Leyendas	Mexico City	Volador Jr. defeated Negro Casas in a two out of three falls hair vs. hair match
21	DDT	Judgement 2016: DDT 19th Anniversary	Tokyo, Japan	Harashima defeated Isami Kodaka (c) to win the KO-D Openweight Championship
23	AAA	Rey de Reyes	San Luis	El Texano Jr. defeated El Mesías to win the vacant AAA Mega Championship
(c) – denotes defending champion(s)

=== April ===
Date	Promotion(s)	Event	Location	Main event
1	WWE: NXT	TakeOver: Dallas	Dallas, TX	Finn Bálor (c) defeated Samoa Joe to retain the NXT Championship
1	ROH	Supercard of Honor X	Dallas, TX	The Young Bucks (Matt & Nick Jackson) defeated The Motor City Machine Guns (Alex Shelley & Chris Sabin) in a tag team match
2	ROH	Supercard of Honor X	Dallas, TX	Kyle O'Reilly defeated Adam Cole in a No Holds Barred match
3	WWE	WrestleMania 32	Arlington, TX	Roman Reigns defeated Triple H (c) to win the WWE World Heavyweight Championship
10	NJPW	Invasion Attack	Tokyo	Tetsuya Naito defeated Kazuchika Okada (c) to win the IWGP Heavyweight Championship
29	CMLL	Arena México; 60th Anniversary Show	Mexico City	Místico & Mephisto defeated Carístico & Cibernético in the final of the 2016 Torneo Nacional de Parejas Increíbles tournament
(c) – denotes defending champion(s)

=== May ===
Date	Promotion(s)	Event	Location	Main event
1	WWE	Payback	Rosemont, IL	Roman Reigns (c) defeated AJ Styles in a no countout, no disqualification match to retain the WWE World Heavyweight Championship
3	NJPW	Wrestling Dontaku	Fukuoka	Tetsuya Naito (c) defeated Tomohiro Ishii to retain the IWGP Heavyweight Championship
8	ROH; NJPW	Global Wars	Chicago Ridge, IL	Jay Lethal (c) vs. Colt Cabana for the ROH World Championship ended in a no contest
19	NJPW	Lion's Gate Project 2	Tokyo, Japan	Hiroyoshi Tenzan, Manabu Nakanishi, Satoshi Kojima and Yuji Nagata defeated Katsuhiko Nakajima, Masa Kitamiya, Maybach Taniguchi and Quiet Storm in an Eight-man tag team match
22	WWE	Extreme Rules	Newark, NJ	Roman Reigns (c) defeated AJ Styles in an Extreme Rules match to retain the WWE World Heavyweight Championship
(c) – denotes defending champion(s)

=== June ===
Date	Promotion(s)	Event	Location	Main event	Notes
3–5	AAA	Lucha Libre World Cup	Mexico City	Johnny Mundo defeated Pentagón Jr. in the final sudden death match to win the 2016 Lucha Libre World Cup for Team Lucha Underground, after the final and first two sudden death matches had ended in time limit draws	
8	WWE: NXT	TakeOver: The End	Winter Park, FL	Samoa Joe (c) defeated Finn Bálor in a Steel Cage match to retain the NXT Championship	
12	TNA	Slammiversary	Orlando, FL	Lashley defeated Drew Galloway (c) by submission in a "knock out or tap out" match to win the TNA World Heavyweight Championship	
13	TNA	One Night Only: World Cup	Orlando, Florida	Ten person intergender elimination tag team match	Aired on July 22
19	NJPW	Dominion	Osaka	Kazuchika Okada defeated Tetsuya Naito (c) to win the IWGP Heavyweight Championship	
19	WWE	Money in the Bank	Las Vegas, NV	Seth Rollins defeated Roman Reigns (c) to win the WWE World Heavyweight Championship, then Dean Ambrose cashed in his Money in the Bank contract and defeated Seth Rollins (c) to win the WWE World Heavyweight Championship	On June 27, the WWE World Heavyweight Championship was renamed to WWE Championship
24	ROH	Best in the World	Concord, NC	Jay Lethal (c) defeated Jay Briscoe to retain the ROH World Championship	
(c) – denotes defending champion(s)

=== July ===
Date	Promotion(s)	Event	Location	Main event	Notes
1	CMLL	International Gran Prix	Mexico City, Mexico	Volador Jr. defeated Tama Tonga to win the match for "Team Mexico" Also in the match: Team Mexico (Diamante Azul, Máximo, La Máscara, Rey Escorpión, Rush, Shocker and Último Guerrero), Team International (Johnny Idol, Kushida, Marco Corleone, Michael Elgin, Okumura, Sam Adonis and Tanga Roa) in a 2016 CMLL International Gran Prix, 16-man Torneo Cibernetico	
13–14	TNA	One Night Only: X-Travaganza	Orlando, Florida	7-man Ladder match to determine the #1 contender for the TNA X Division Championship	Aired on August 26
24	WWE	Battleground	Washington, D.C.	Dean Ambrose (c) defeated Roman Reigns and Seth Rollins to retain the WWE Championship	Final WWE PPV before the second brand split went into full affect After the unveiling of the WWE Universal Championship for the Raw brand on July 25, the WWE Championship was renamed to WWE World Championship on July 26
(c) – denotes defending champion(s)

=== August ===
Date	Promotion(s)	Event	Location	Main event	Notes
11–14	TNA	One Night Only: September	Orlando, Florida	Eddie Edwards vs. Lashley	
14	NJPW	G1 Climax Final	Tokyo	Kenny Omega defeated Hirooki Goto in the final of the 2016 G1 Climax tournament	
16–17	TNA	One Night Only: Against All Odds	Orlando, Florida	Matt Hardy vs. Ethan Carter III	
19	ROH	Death Before Dishonor	Las Vegas, NV	Adam Cole defeated Jay Lethal (c) to win the ROH World Championship	
20	WWE: NXT	TakeOver: Brooklyn II	Brooklyn, NY	Shinsuke Nakamura defeated Samoa Joe (c) to win the NXT Championship	
21	NJPW	Super J-Cup Final	Tokyo	Kushida defeated Yoshinobu Kanemaru in the final of the 2016 Super J-Cup	
21	WWE: Raw; SmackDown	SummerSlam	Brooklyn, NY	Brock Lesnar defeated Randy Orton by TKO in a singles match	First WWE PPV after the second brand split went into full affect.
27	ROH	Field of Honor	Brooklyn, NY	Adam Cole (c) defeated Jay Lethal, Tetsuya Naito and Hiroshi Tanahashi in a Four Corner Survival match to retain the ROH World Championship	
28	AAA	Triplemanía XXIV	Mexico City	Psycho Clown defeated Pagano in a two-out-of-three falls lucha de apuesta, mask vs. hair match	
28	DDT	Ryōgoku Peter Pan 2016	Tokyo, Japan	Shuji Ishikawa defeated Konosuke Takeshita (c) to win the KO-D Openweight Championship	
(c) – denotes defending champion(s)

=== September ===
Date	Promotion(s)	Event	Location	Main event	Notes
1	NJPW	Lion's Gate Project 3	Tokyo, Japan	Hiroyoshi Tenzan, Katsuyori Shibata, Manabu Nakanishi, Satoshi Kojima and Yuji Nagata defeated Go Shiozaki, Kaito Kiyomiya, Katsuhiko Nakajima, Masa Kitamiya and Maybach Taniguchi in a Ten-man tag team match	
2	CMLL	83rd Anniversary Show	Mexico City	Dragon Lee defeated La Máscara in a two-out-of-three falls lucha de apuestas, mask vs. mask match	
2–4	PWG	Battle of Los Angeles	Reseda, CA	Marty Scurll defeated Trevor Lee and Will Ospreay in a three-way elimination match to win the 2016 Battle of Los Angeles tournament	
11	WWE: SmackDown	Backlash	Richmond, VA	AJ Styles defeated Dean Ambrose (c) to win the WWE World Championship	First Backlash event since 2009. First brand-exclusive event since the reintroduction of the brand split, subsequently the first SmackDown-exclusive event under the second brand split.
14	WWE	Cruiserweight Classic Finale	Winter Park, FL	T. J. Perkins defeated Gran Metalik in the tournament final to win the WWE Cruiserweight Championship	First event to feature the WWE Cruiserweight Championship (new version with a separate lineage from the original).
17	NJPW	Destruction	Tokyo	Bushi defeated Kushida (c) to win the IWGP Junior Heavyweight Championship	
22	NJPW	Destruction	Hiroshima	Kenny Omega defeated Yoshi-Hashi to earn the right to challenge for the IWGP Heavyweight Championship at Wrestle Kingdom 11	
25	NJPW	Destruction	Kobe	Tetsuya Naito defeated Michael Elgin (c) to win the IWGP Intercontinental Championship	
25	WWE: Raw	Clash of Champions	Indianapolis, IN	Kevin Owens (c) defeated Seth Rollins to retain the WWE Universal Championship	First Raw-exclusive event under the second brand split.
30	ROH	All Star Extravaganza	Lowell, MA	The Young Bucks (Matt Jackson & Nick Jackson) defeated The Addiction (Christopher Daniels & Frankie Kazarian) (c) and The Motor City Machine Guns (Alex Shelley & Chris Sabin) in the Ladder War VI to win the ROH World Tag Team Championship	
(c) – denotes defending champion(s)

=== October ===
Date	Promotion(s)	Event	Location	Main event	Notes
2	AAA	Héroes Inmortales X	Monterrey	Johnny Mundo (c) defeated Garza Jr. to retain the AAA Latin American Championship	
2	TNA	Bound for Glory	Orlando, FL	Lashley (c) defeated Ethan Carter III in a No Holds Barred match to retain the TNA World Heavyweight Championship	
5	TNA	One Night Only: December	Orlando, Florida	Mike Bennett vs. Eddie Edwards	Aired on December 12
9	WWE: SmackDown	No Mercy	Sacramento, CA	Advertised main event: AJ Styles (c) defeated John Cena and Dean Ambrose in a triple threat match to retain the WWE World Championship; Final match: Bray Wyatt defeated Randy Orton in a singles match	The advertised main event was originally the last match on the card, but was changed last minute due to the presidential debate the same night
10	NJPW	King of Pro-Wrestling	Tokyo	Kazuchika Okada (c) defeated Naomichi Marufuji to retain the IWGP Heavyweight Championship	
14	ROH	Glory By Honor XV	Chicago Ridge, IL	The Young Bucks (Matt Jackson & Nick Jackson) (c) defeated Colt Cabana & Dalton Castle to retain the ROH World Tag Team Championship	
15	ROH	Glory By Honor XV	Dearborn, MI	The Young Bucks (Matt Jackson & Nick Jackson) (c) defeated Colt Cabana & Dalton Castle to retain the ROH World Tag Team Championship	
15	WWC	WWC Anniversary 43	Bayamón, Puerto Rico	Angel Cotto defeated Jaycobs (c), Angel Fashion, Tommy Diablo, Engel and OT Fernandez	
30	WWE: Raw	Hell in a Cell	Boston, MA	Charlotte defeated Sasha Banks (c) in a Hell in a Cell match to win the WWE Raw Women's Championship	This was the first-ever women's Hell in a Cell match and the first time that a women's match was the main event of a WWE pay-per-view
(c) – denotes defending champion(s)

=== November ===
Date	Promotion(s)	Event	Location	Main event	Notes
3	ROH	Survival of the Fittest	Arlington, TX	Bobby Fish defeated Lio Rush, Punishment Martinez, Jax Dane, Dalton Castle and The Panther in a six-way elimination match to win the 2016 Survival of the Fittest tournament	
4	ROH	Survival of the Fittest	San Antonio, TX	Bobby Fish defeated Lio Rush, Punishment Martinez, Jax Dane, Dalton Castle and The Panther in a six-way elimination match to win the 2016 Survival of the Fittest tournament	
5	NJPW	Power Struggle	Osaka	Tetsuya Naito (c) defeated Jay Lethal to retain the IWGP Intercontinental Championship	
10	NJPW / RevPro	Global Wars UK	Bethnal Green, United Kingdom	Katsuyori Shibata defeated Zack Sabre Jr (c) in a Singles match for the British Heavyweight Championship	
11	NJPW / RevPro	Global Wars UK	Walthamstow, United Kingdom	Katsuyori Shibata (c) defeated Chris Hero in a Singles match for the British Heavyweight Championship	
19	WWE: NXT	TakeOver: Toronto	Toronto	Samoa Joe defeated Shinsuke Nakamura (c) to win the NXT Championship	
20	WWE: Raw; SmackDown	Survivor Series	Toronto	Goldberg defeated Brock Lesnar in a singles match	Goldberg's first match in WWE after 12 years.
(c) – denotes defending champion(s)

=== December ===
Date	Promotion(s)	Event	Location	Main event	Notes
2	ROH	Final Battle	New York City, NY	Kyle O'Reilly defeated Adam Cole (c) in the No Disqualification match to win the ROH World Championship	
4	WWE: SmackDown	TLC: Tables, Ladders & Chairs	Dallas, TX	AJ Styles (c) defeated Dean Ambrose in a Tables, Ladders, and Chairs match to retain the WWE World Championship	On the following episode of SmackDown Live, the WWE World Championship was renamed to WWE Championship
10	NJPW	World Tag League Final	Rifu	Great Bash Heel (Togi Makabe & Tomoaki Honma) defeated Guerrillas of Destiny (Tama Tonga & Tanga Loa) in the final of the 2016 World Tag League tournament	
13	WWE: Raw; SmackDown	Tribute to the Troops	Washington, D.C.	Roman Reigns and Big Cass defeated Kevin Owens and Rusev in a Tag team match	
18	WWE: Raw	Roadblock: End of the Line	Pittsburgh, PA	Kevin Owens (c) defeated Roman Reigns by disqualification to retain the WWE Universal Championship	
(c) – denotes defending champion(s)

=== Cancelled events ===
Date	Promotion(s)	Event	Location	Main event	Notes
TBA	WWE: Raw; SmackDown	WWE Elimination Chamber	TBA	TBA	

== Accomplishments and tournaments ==
=== AAA ===
Accomplishment	Winner	Date won	Notes
Rey de Reyes	Pentagón Jr.	March 23	
Copa Triplemanía	Australian Suicide	August 28	Last eliminated Daga to win
Copa Antonio Peña	Pimpinela Escarlata	October 2	Last eliminated El Zorro to win

=== JWP ===
Accomplishment	Winner	Date won	Notes
Tag League the Best 2016	Hanako Nakamori and Makoto	February 21	

=== Ring of Honor ===
Accomplishment	Winner	Date won	Notes
ROH World Six-Man Tag Team Championship Tournament	The Kingdom (Matt Taven, T. K. O'Ryan and Vinny Marseglia)	December 2	

=== Total Nonstop Action Wrestling ===
Accomplishment	Winner	Date won	Notes
TNA World Title Series	Ethan Carter III	January 5	
Joker's Wild	Drew Galloway	January 31	
Knockouts Knockdown	Jade	March 17	
World Cup	Team Hardy (Jeff Hardy, Eddie Edwards, Robbie E, Jessie Godderz, Jade)	June 13	
Impact Grand Championship Tournament	Aron Rex	October 2	
Turkey Bowl	Robbie E	November 24	

=== WWE ===
Accomplishment	Winner	Date won	Notes
Royal Rumble	Triple H	January 24	Unlike the traditional means in which the winner received a world championship match at WrestleMania, this year's match was for the WWE World Heavyweight Championship in which Roman Reigns, who entered at number one, defended the title; Triple H eliminated Reigns before lastly eliminating Dean Ambrose to win the title.
André the Giant Memorial Battle Royal	Baron Corbin	April 3	Last eliminated Kane to win the André the Giant Memorial Trophy.
WWE Tag Team Championship #1 Contender's Tournament	The Vaudevillains (Aiden English and Simon Gotch)	May 1	Faced Enzo Amore and Big Cass in the tournament final, but the match ended in a no contest due to Enzo suffering a legitimate injury. The Vaudevillains were instead awarded the WWE Tag Team Championship match against champions The New Day (Big E and Xavier Woods) at Extreme Rules, but were unsuccessful.
Money in the Bank ladder match	Dean Ambrose	June 19	Defeated Kevin Owens, Alberto Del Rio, Chris Jericho, Sami Zayn, and Cesaro to win a WWE World Heavyweight Championship match contract. Immediately following the main event that same night, Ambrose cashed in the contract and won the title from Seth Rollins, who had just won the title from Roman Reigns.
WWE SmackDown Tag Team Championship Tournament	Heath Slater and Rhyno	September 11	Defeated The Usos (Jey Uso and Jimmy Uso) in the tournament final to determine the inaugural SmackDown Tag Team Champions.
Cruiserweight Classic	T. J. Perkins	September 14	Defeated Gran Metalik in the tournament final to win the inaugural WWE Cruiserweight Championship
Dusty Rhodes Tag Team Classic	The Authors of Pain (Akam and Rezar)	November 19	Defeated TM-61 (Nick Miller and Shane Thorne) in the tournament final to win the Dusty Rhodes Tag Team Classic Trophy.

== Title changes ==
=== AAA ===
AAA Mega Championship
Incoming champion – Vacant
Date	Winner	Event/Show	Note(s)
March 23	El Texano Jr.	Rey de Reyes	

AAA Latin American Championship
Incoming champion – Psycho Clown
Date	Winner	Event/Show	Note(s)
July 3	Pentagón Jr.	Lucha Libre AAA Worldwide	
August 28	Johnny Mundo	Triplemanía XXIV	

AAA World Mini-Estrella Championship
Incoming champion – Dinastía
No title changes

AAA World Cruiserweight Championship
Incoming champion – El Hijo del Fantasma
No title changes

AAA Reina de Reinas Championship
Incoming champion – Taya
No title changes

AAA World Tag Team Championship
Incoming champions – Los Güeros del Cielo (Angélico and Jack Evans)
Date	Winner	Event/Show	Note(s)
January 22	Vacated	Guerra de Titanes	
January 22	Los Hell Brothers (Averno and Chessman)	Guerra de Titanes	
July 17	Los Hell Brothers (Averno and Chessman)	AAA Sin Límite	
August 28	Aero Star and Drago	Triplemanía XXIV	

AAA World Mixed Tag Team Championship
Incoming champions – La Sociedad (Pentagón Jr. and Sexy Star)
Date	Winner	Event/Show	Note(s)
February 19	Vacated	AAA Television Taping	

AAA World Trios Championship
Incoming champions – Los Hell Brothers (Averno, Chessman and Cibernético)
Date	Winner	Event/Show	Note(s)
January 22	Los Xinetez (Dark Cuervo, Dark Scoria and El Zorro)	Guerra de Titanes	
November 4	Los OGT (Averno, Chessman and Ricky Marvin)	AAA Worldwide	

=== TNA ===
TNA World Heavyweight Championship
Incoming champion – Vacated
Date	Winner	Event/Show	Note(s)
January 5	Ethan Carter III	Impact Wrestling	Carter III defeated Matt Hardy in the finals of the TNA World Title Series to win the vacant title
January 8 (aired January 19)	Matt Hardy	Impact Wrestling	This was a Last Man Standing match. Had Hardy not won, he would have left TNA.
March 15	Drew Galloway	Impact Wrestling	Galloway invoked his Feast or Fired title opportunity to challenge Hardy for the championship and win the title
June 12	Lashley	Slammiversary	This was a Knockout or Tapout Only match. On July 13, Lashley also won the TNA X Division Championship defeating then-champion Eddie Edwards in a title vs. title steel cage match. On August 11, Lashley also won the TNA King of the Mountain Championship by defeating then-champion James Storm in a title vs. titles match. The following day, Lashley retired the TNA King of the Mountain Championship and vacated the X Division Championship
October 3 (aired October 6)	Eddie Edwards	Impact Wrestling	

TNA X Division Championship
Incoming champion – Tigre Uno
Date	Winner	Event/Show	Note(s)
January 9 (aired February 2)	Trevor Lee	Impact Wrestling	
June 12	Eddie Edwards	Slammiversary	This was a four-way match, also involving Andrew Everett and DJ Z
June 14 (aired June 21)	Mike Bennett	Impact Wrestling	
June 15 (aired July 5)	Eddie Edwards	Impact Wrestling	Ultimate X match, also involving Trevor Lee, Andrew Everett, DJ Z, Rockstar Spud, Mandrews, and Braxton Sutter.
July 13 (aired July 21)	Lashley	Impact Wrestling	This was a Winner Takes All Six Sides of Steel match for both Edwards's X Division Championship and Lashley's TNA World Heavyweight Championship.
August 12 (aired August 18)	Vacated	Impact Wrestling	Lashley unified the TNA King of the Mountain Championship with his TNA World Heavyweight Championship and vacated the X Division Championship.
August 13 (aired September 1)	DJ Z	Impact Wrestling	Ultimate X match, also involving Trevor Lee, Andrew Everett, Rockstar Spud, Mandrews, and Braxton Sutter.

TNA King of the Mountain Championship
Incoming champion – Bobby Roode
Date	Winner	Event/Show	Note(s)
January 6 (aired January 12)	Eric Young	Impact Wrestling	With this victory, Young became the only wrestler to win this championship under all four (Legends, Global, Television, King of the Mountain) of its incarnations
March 19 (aired April 26)	Bram	Sacrifice	Falls Count Anywhere match.
April 23 (aired May 31)	Eli Drake	Impact Wrestling	Drake invoked his Feast or Fired contract after Bram had been attacked by Lashley.
July 14 (aired August 4)	James Storm	Impact Wrestling	Drake invoked his Feast or Fired contract after Bram had been attacked by Lashley.
August 11	Lashley	Impact Wrestling	This was a Winner Takes All match, also for Lashley's TNA World Heavyweight Championship and TNA X Division Championship
August 12 (aired August 18)	Retired	Impact Wrestling	Lashley unified the championship with his TNA World Heavyweight Championship, however at the August 13 tapings of Impact Wrestling, TNA President Billy Corgan announced that the title would be deactivated and retired.

TNA Grand Championship
(Title created)
Date	Winner	Event/Show	Note(s)
October 2	Aron Rex	Bound for Glory	Defeated Eddie Edwards in a tournament final by split decision to become the inaugural champion. Edwards was a substitute for Drew Galloway, who was legitimately injured
October 9 (aired December 1)	Moose	Impact Wrestling	

TNA World Tag Team Championship
Incoming champions – The Wolves (Davey Richards and Eddie Edwards)
Date	Winner	Event/Show	Note(s)
January 31 (aired March 8)	Beer Money, Inc. (Bobby Roode and James Storm)	Impact Wrestling	Storm cashed in his Feast or Fired Tag Team Championship contract.
March 19 (aired April 26)	Decay (Abyss and Crazzy Steve)	Impact Wrestling	Valley of Shadows match.
October 2	The Broken Hardys (Matt Hardy and Brother Nero)	Bound for Glory	This was The Great War. The team was previously known as The Hardys, and Brother Nero was previously known as Jeff Hardy.

TNA Knockouts Championship
Incoming champion – Gail Kim
Date	Winner	Event/Show	Note(s)
March 17 (aired April 5)	Jade	Impact Wrestling	Three–way match also involving Madison Rayne.
June 12	Sienna	Slammiversary	Three–way match, also involving Gail Kim
August 12	Allie	Turning Point	Five–way match, also involving Madison Rayne, Jade, and Marti Belle
August 13 (aired September 1)	Maria Kanellis-Bennett	Impact Wrestling	
October 2	Gail Kim	Bound for Glory	
October 9	Vacated	Impact Wrestling	The title was vacated due to Gail Kim sustaining an injury
October 9 (aired December 1)	Rosemary	Impact Wrestling	Defeated Jade in a Six Sides of Steel match to win the vacant title.

=== NJPW ===
IWGP Heavyweight Championship
Incoming champion – Kazuchika Okada
Date	Winner	Event/Show	Note(s)
April 10	Tetsuya Naito	Invasion Attack	
June 19	Kazuchika Okada	Dominion 6.19 in Osaka-jo Hall	

IWGP Intercontinental Championship
Incoming champion – Shinsuke Nakamura
Date	Winner	Event/Show	Note(s)
January 25	Vacated	–	Vacated due to Nakamura leaving NJPW
February 14	Kenny Omega	The New Beginning in Niigata	Defeated Hiroshi Tanahashi to win the vacant title
June 19	Michael Elgin	Dominion 6.19 in Osaka-jo Hall	This was a ladder match
September 25	Tetsuya Naito	Destruction in Kobe	

IWGP Tag Team Championship
Incoming champions – Bullet Club (Doc Gallows and Karl Anderson)
Date	Winner	Event/Show	Note(s)
January 4	G.B.H. (Togi Makabe and Tomoaki Honma)	Wrestle Kingdom 10	
April 10	Guerrillas of Destiny (Tama Tonga and Tanga Loa)	Invasion Attack	
June 19	The Briscoe Brothers (Jay Briscoe and Mark Briscoe)	Dominion 6.19 in Osaka-jo Hall	
October 10	Guerrillas of Destiny (Tama Tonga and Tanga Loa)	King of Pro-Wrestling	

IWGP Junior Heavyweight Championship
Incoming champion – Kenny Omega
Date	Winner	Event/Show	Note(s)
January 4	Kushida	Wrestle Kingdom 10	
September 17	Bushi	Destruction in Tokyo	
November 5	Kushida	Power Struggle	

IWGP Junior Heavyweight Tag Team Championship
Incoming champions – reDRagon (Bobby Fish and Kyle O'Reilly)
Date	Winner	Event/Show	Note(s)
January 4	The Young Bucks (Matt Jackson and Nick Jackson)	Wrestle Kingdom 10	
February 11	Matt Sydal and King Ricochet	The New Beginning in Osaka	This was a three-way match, also involving reDRagon
April 10	Roppongi Vice (Beretta and Rocky Romero)	Invasion Attack	
May 3	Matt Sydal and King Ricochet	Wrestling Dontaku	
June 19	The Young Bucks (Matt Jackson and Nick Jackson)	Dominion 6.19 in Osaka-jo Hall	This was a four-way elimination match, also involving reDRagon (Bobby Fish and Kyle O'Reilly) and Roppongi Vice (Beretta and Rocky Romero)

NEVER Openweight Championship
Incoming champion – Tomohiro Ishii
Date	Winner	Event/Show	Note(s)
January 4	Katsuyori Shibata	Wrestle Kingdom 10	
May 3	Yuji Nagata	Wrestling Dontaku	
June 19	Katsuyori Shibata	Dominion 6.19 in Osaka-jo Hall	
November 5	Evil	Power Struggle	
November 15	Katsuyori Shibata	Wrestling World in Singapore	

NEVER Openweight 6-Man Tag Team Championship
Incoming champions – N/A
Date	Winner	Event/Show	Note(s)
January 4	Chaos (Jay Briscoe, Mark Briscoe and Toru Yano)	Wrestle Kingdom 10	Defeated Bullet Club (Bad Luck Fale, Tama Tonga and Yujiro Takahashi) to become the inaugural champions
February 11	Bullet Club (Bad Luck Fale, Tama Tonga and Yujiro Takahashi)	The New Beginning in Osaka	
February 14	Chaos (Jay Briscoe, Mark Briscoe and Toru Yano)	The New Beginning in Niigata	
February 20	The Elite (Kenny Omega, Matt Jackson and Nick Jackson)	Honor Rising: Japan	
April 10	Hiroshi Tanahashi, Michael Elgin and Yoshitatsu	Invasion Attack	
May 3	The Elite (Kenny Omega, Matt Jackson and Nick Jackson)	Wrestling Dontaku	
July 3	Matt Sydal, Ricochet and Satoshi Kojima	Kizuna Road	
September 25	Vacated	–	Vacated due to Sydal failing to make a scheduled championship defense because of "travel issues"
September 25	David Finlay, Ricochet and Satoshi Kojima	Destruction in Kobe	Defeated Bullet Club (Adam Cole, Matt Jackson and Nick Jackson) to win the vacant title

=== ROH ===
ROH World Championship
Incoming champion – Jay Lethal
Date	Winner	Event/Show	Note(s)
August 19	Adam Cole	Death Before Dishonor XIV	
December 2	Kyle O'Reilly	Final Battle	

ROH World Television Championship
Incoming champion – Roderick Strong
Date	Winner	Event/Show	Note(s)
February 9	Tomohiro Ishii	Honor Rising: Japan	
May 8	Bobby Fish	Global Wars	
November 18	Will Ospreay	Reach for the Sky Tour	
November 20	Marty Scurll	Reach for the Sky Tour	

ROH World Six-Man Tag Team Championship
(Title created)
Date	Winner	Event/Show	Note(s)
December 2	The Kingdom (Matt Taven, T. K. O'Ryan and Vinny Marseglia)	Final Battle	

ROH World Tag Team Championship
Incoming champions – War Machine (Hanson and Raymond Rowe)
Date	Winner	Event/Show	Note(s)
May 9	The Addiction (Christopher Daniels and Frankie Kazarian)	War of the Worlds	
September 30	The Young Bucks (Matt Jackson and Nick Jackson)	All Star Extravaganza VIII	

=== The Crash Lucha Libre ===
The Crash Cruiserweight Championship
Incoming champion – Bestia 666
Date	Winner	Event/Show	Note(s)
2016	Vacated	N/A	Championship vacated for undocumented reasons
August 13	Flamita	The Crash show	Defeated El Torito, Fly Warrior, Laredo Kid, Lince Dorado, Septimo Dragon, and Willie Mack to win the vacant title

The Crash Junior Championship
Incoming champion – Mirage
Date	Winner	Event/Show	Note(s)
February 12	Black Boy	The Crash show	This was a five-way elimination match also involving Jinzo and Proximo and Septimo Dragon
July 24	Black Danger	The Crash show	

The Crash Tag Team Championship
Incoming champions – Tony Casanova and Zarco
Date	Winner	Event/Show	Note(s)
August 13	Garza Jr. and Último Ninja	The Crash show	

The Crash Women's Championship
(Title created)
Date	Winner	Event/Show	Note(s)
November 26	Sexy Dulce	The Crash V Aniversario	Dulce defeated Keira to become the first champion

=== WWE ===
– Raw
– SmackDown
– NXT

==== Raw and SmackDown ====
Following the reintroduction of the WWE brand extension in July, in which titles became exclusive to a brand and others were established as counterparts to the opposing brand's championships, Raw and SmackDown each had a world championship, a secondary championship, a women's championship, and a male tag team championship. A championship was also established for Raw's cruiserweight wrestlers.

WWE World Heavyweight Championship
Incoming champion – Roman Reigns
Date	Winner	Event/Show	Note(s)
January 24	Triple H	Royal Rumble	This was the Royal Rumble match, in which Roman Reigns defended the title. Triple H eliminated Reigns before lastly eliminating Dean Ambrose
April 3	Roman Reigns	WrestleMania 32	
June 19	Seth Rollins	Money in the Bank	
June 19	Dean Ambrose	Money in the Bank	Cashed in his Money in the Bank contract
The title was renamed to WWE World Championship
The title became exclusive to the SmackDown brand following the Draft in July when Dean Ambrose was drafted to SmackDown and retained the title against Raw draftees Roman Reigns and Seth Rollins in a triple threat match at Battleground. The title was renamed to WWE World Championship after the unveiling of the WWE Universal Championship for the Raw brand in July.
September 11	AJ Styles	Backlash	
The title was renamed back to WWE Championship

WWE Universal Championship
(Title created)
Date	Winner	Event/Show	Note(s)
August 21	Finn Bálor	SummerSlam	Defeated Seth Rollins in a pinfall and submission-only match to become the inaugural champion
August 22	Vacated	Monday Night Raw	Finn Bálor suffered a legitimate shoulder injury in winning the title
August 29	Kevin Owens	Monday Night Raw	Fatal four-way elimination match for the vacant title, also involving Big Cass, Roman Reigns, and Seth Rollins

WWE Intercontinental Championship
Incoming champion – Dean Ambrose
Date	Winner	Event/Show	Note(s)
February 15	Kevin Owens	Monday Night Raw	Fatal five-way match, also involving Tyler Breeze, Stardust, and Dolph Ziggler
April 3	Zack Ryder	WrestleMania 32	Seven-way ladder match, also involving Dolph Ziggler, Sami Zayn, Stardust, Sin Cara, and The Miz
April 4	The Miz	Monday Night Raw	
The title became exclusive to the SmackDown brand following the Draft in July when The Miz was drafted to SmackDown and retained the title against Raw draftee Darren Young at Battleground.
October 9	Dolph Ziggler	No Mercy	Title vs. career match
November 15	The Miz	SmackDown Live	

WWE United States Championship
Incoming champion – Alberto Del Rio
Date	Winner	Event/Show	Note(s)
January 11	Kalisto	Monday Night Raw	
January 12	Alberto Del Rio	SmackDown Live	
January 24	Kalisto	Royal Rumble	
May 22	Rusev	Extreme Rules	
The title became exclusive to the Raw brand following the Draft in July when Rusev was drafted to Raw and retained the title against SmackDown draftee Zack Ryder at Battleground.
September 25	Roman Reigns	Clash of Champions	

WWE Divas Championship
Incoming champion – Charlotte
Date	Winner	Event/Show	Note(s)
April 3	Retired	WrestleMania 32	The Divas Championship was retired and replaced by the new WWE Women's Championship

WWE Women's Championship
(Title created)
Date	Winner	Event/Show	Note(s)
April 3	Charlotte	WrestleMania 32	Defeated Becky Lynch and Sasha Banks in a triple threat match to become the inaugural champion. Charlotte was the Divas Champion going into the match and that title was retired after the unveiling of the new Women's Championship
The title became exclusive to the Raw brand following the Draft in July when Charlotte was drafted to Raw.
July 25	Sasha Banks	Monday Night Raw	
August 21	Charlotte	SummerSlam	
The title was renamed to Raw Women's Championship on September 5 after the unveiling of the SmackDown Women's Championship
October 3	Sasha Banks	Monday Night Raw	
October 30	Charlotte Flair	Hell in a Cell	First women's Hell in a Cell match and first time a women's match was the main event of a WWE pay-per-view. Charlotte's ring name was lengthened to "Charlotte Flair"
November 28	Sasha Banks	Monday Night Raw	Falls Count Anywhere match
December 18	Charlotte Flair	Roadblock: End of the Line	30-minute Iron Man match; Charlotte won 3–2 in sudden death overtime. Sasha Banks could no longer challenge for the title as long as Flair was champion (had Banks won, Flair could not have challenged for the title as long as Banks was champion).

WWE SmackDown Women's Championship
(Title created)
Date	Winner	Event/Show	Note(s)
September 11	Becky Lynch	Backlash	Defeated Alexa Bliss, Carmella, Naomi, Natalya, and Nikki Bella in a six-pack elimination challenge to become the inaugural champion
December 4	Alexa Bliss	TLC: Tables, Ladders & Chairs	Tables match

WWE Tag Team Championship
Incoming champions – The New Day (Big E, Kofi Kingston, and Xavier Woods)
Date	Winner	Event/Show	Note(s)
The title became exclusive to the Raw brand following the Draft in July when The New Day were drafted to Raw. The title was renamed to Raw Tag Team Championship on September 5 after the unveiling of the SmackDown Tag Team Championship.
December 18	Cesaro and Sheamus	Roadblock: End of the Line	Big E and Kofi Kingston represented The New Day.

WWE SmackDown Tag Team Championship
(Title created)
Date	Winner	Event/Show	Note(s)
September 11	Heath Slater and Rhyno	Backlash	Defeated The Usos (Jey and Jimmy Uso) in the tournament final to become the inaugural champions
December 4	The Wyatt Family (Bray Wyatt, Luke Harper, and Randy Orton)	TLC: Tables, Ladders & Chairs	Wyatt and Orton won the match, but Harper was also recognized as champion under the Freebird Rule.
December 27	American Alpha (Chad Gable and Jason Jordan)	SmackDown Live	Fatal four-way tag team elimination match, also involving Heath Slater and Rhyno and The Usos (Jey and Jimmy Uso). Luke Harper and Randy Orton represented The Wyatt Family.

WWE Cruiserweight Championship
(Title created)
Date	Winner	Event/Show	Note(s)
September 14	T. J. Perkins	Cruiserweight Classic	Defeated Gran Metalik in the tournament final to become the inaugural champion
October 30	The Brian Kendrick	Hell in a Cell	
November 29	Rich Swann	205 Live	

==== NXT ====
NXT Championship
Incoming champion – Finn Bálor
Date	Winner	Event/Show	Note(s)
April 21	Samoa Joe	NXT Live	
August 20	Shinsuke Nakamura	TakeOver: Brooklyn II	
November 19	Samoa Joe	TakeOver: Toronto	
December 3	Shinsuke Nakamura	NXT	An edited version of this match aired on the December 7 episode. The full match aired on the December 28 episode

NXT Women's Championship
Incoming champion – Bayley
Date	Winner	Event/Show	Note(s)
April 1	Asuka	TakeOver: Dallas	

NXT Tag Team Championship
Incoming champions – The Revival (Scott Dawson and Dash Wilder)
Date	Winner	Event/Show	Note(s)
April 1	American Alpha (Chad Gable and Jason Jordan)	TakeOver: Dallas	
June 8	The Revival (Scott Dawson and Dash Wilder)	TakeOver: The End	
November 19	#DIY (Johnny Gargano and Tommaso Ciampa)	TakeOver: Toronto	Two-out-of-three falls match

== Awards and honors ==
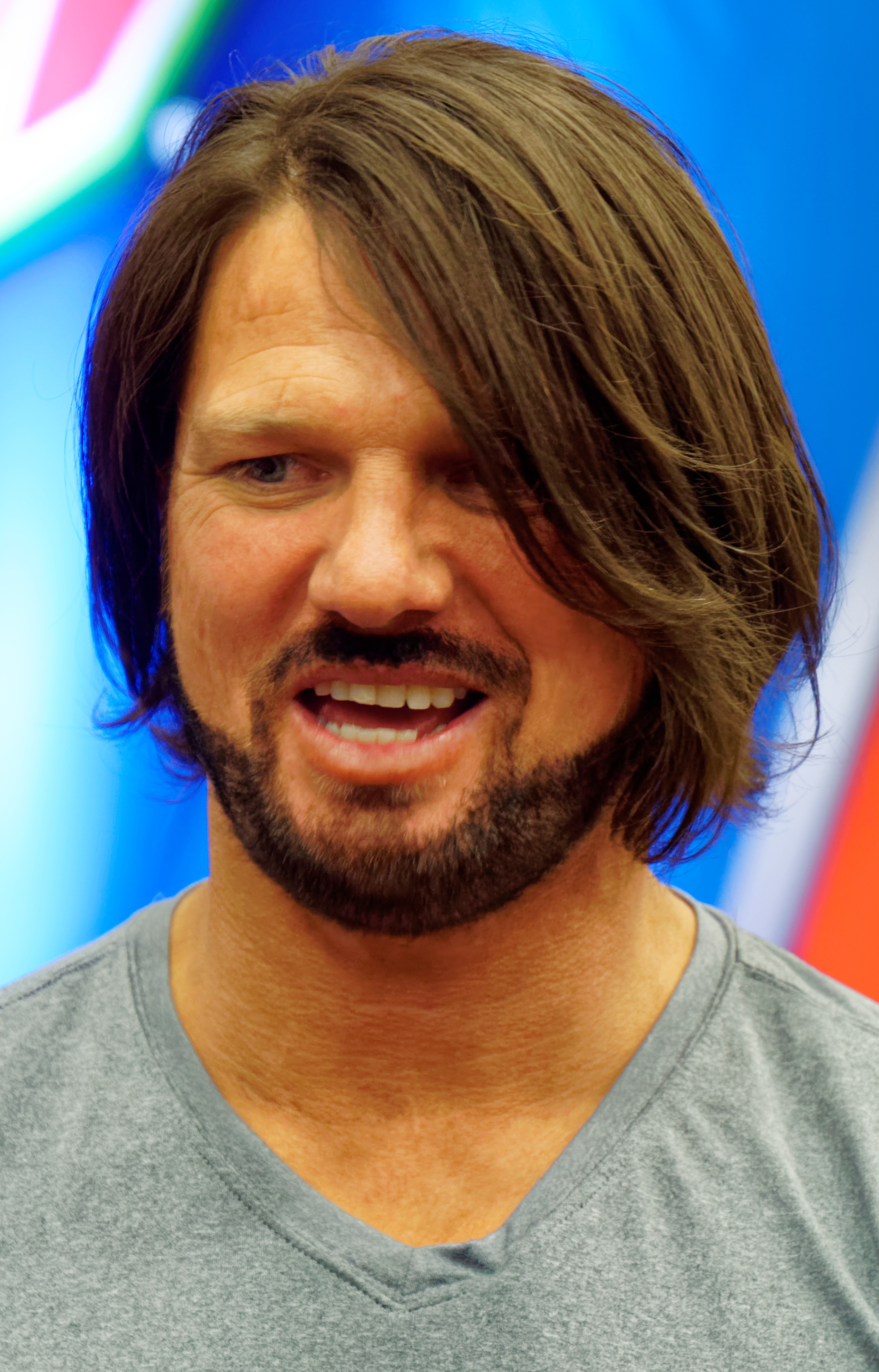
AJ Styles was awarded Pro Wrestling Illustrated Wrestler of the Year and Wrestling Observer Newsletter Wrestler of the Year in 2016

=== AAA Hall of Fame ===
Inductee
Art Barr
Joaquín Roldán

=== Pro Wrestling Illustrated ===
Category	Winner
Wrestler of the Year	A.J. Styles
Tag Team of the Year	The New Day (Big E, Kofi Kingston and Xavier Woods)
Match of the Year	A.J. Styles vs. John Cena (SummerSlam)
Feud of the Year	Sasha Banks vs. Charlotte Flair
Most Popular Wrestler of the Year	Shinsuke Nakamura
Most Hated Wrestler of the Year	Roman Reigns
Comeback of the Year	Goldberg
Most Improved Wrestler of the Year	The Miz
Inspirational Wrestler of the Year	Bayley
Rookie of the Year	Nia Jax
Woman of the Year	Charlotte Flair
Stanley Weston Award (Lifetime Achievement)	Dick Beyer

=== TNA Hall of Fame ===
Inductee
Gail Kim

=== Wrestling Observer Newsletter ===
==== Wrestling Observer Newsletter Hall of Fame ====
Inductee
Daniel Bryan
Gene Okerlund
Sting
James H. McLaughlin

==== Wrestling Observer Newsletter awards ====
Category	Winner
Wrestler of the Year	A.J. Styles
Most Outstanding	A.J. Styles
Tag Team of the Year	The Young Bucks (Matt Jackson and Nick Jackson)
Most Improved	Matt Riddle

=== WWE ===
==== WWE Hall of Fame ====
Category	Inductee	Inducted by
Individual	Sting	Ric Flair
Individual	The Godfather	The Acolytes Protection Agency
Individual	Big Boss Man	Slick
Individual	Jacqueline	The Dudley Boyz
Individual	Stan Hansen	Vader
Group	The Fabulous Freebirds	The New Day
Celebrity	Snoop Dogg	John Cena
Warrior Award	Joan Lunden	Dana Warrior
Legacy	Mildred Burke	
Legacy	Frank Gotch	
Legacy	George Hackenschmidt	
Legacy	Ed "Strangler" Lewis	
Legacy	Pat O'Connor	
Legacy	Lou Thesz	
Legacy	"Sailor" Art Thomas	

==== NXT Year-End Awards ====
Poll	Presenter	Winner
Breakout of the Year	Nigel McGuinness	Billie Kay and Peyton Royce
Match of the Year	Charly Caruso	The Revival (Scott Dawson and Dash Wilder) (c) vs. #DIY (Johnny Gargano and Tommaso Ciampa) in a two-out-of-three falls match for the NXT Tag Team Championship at NXT TakeOver: Toronto
Tag Team of the Year	Corey Graves	The Revival (Scott Dawson and Dash Wilder)
Female Competitor of the Year	Nigel McGuinness	Asuka
Male Competitor of the Year	Nigel McGuinness	Shinsuke Nakamura
Overall Competitor of the Year	Nigel McGuinness	Shinsuke Nakamura

== Debuts ==
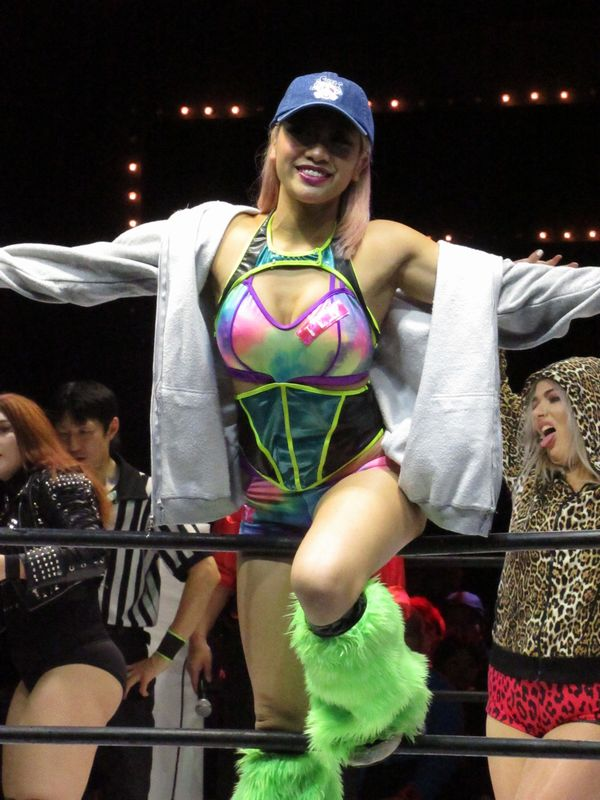
Hana Kimura

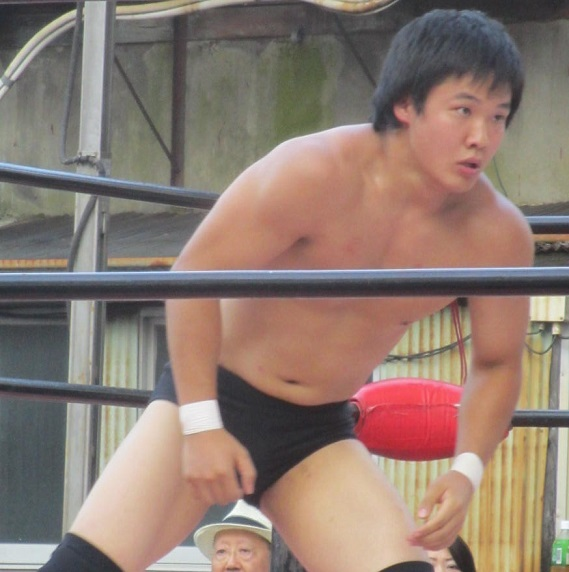
Takuya Nomura

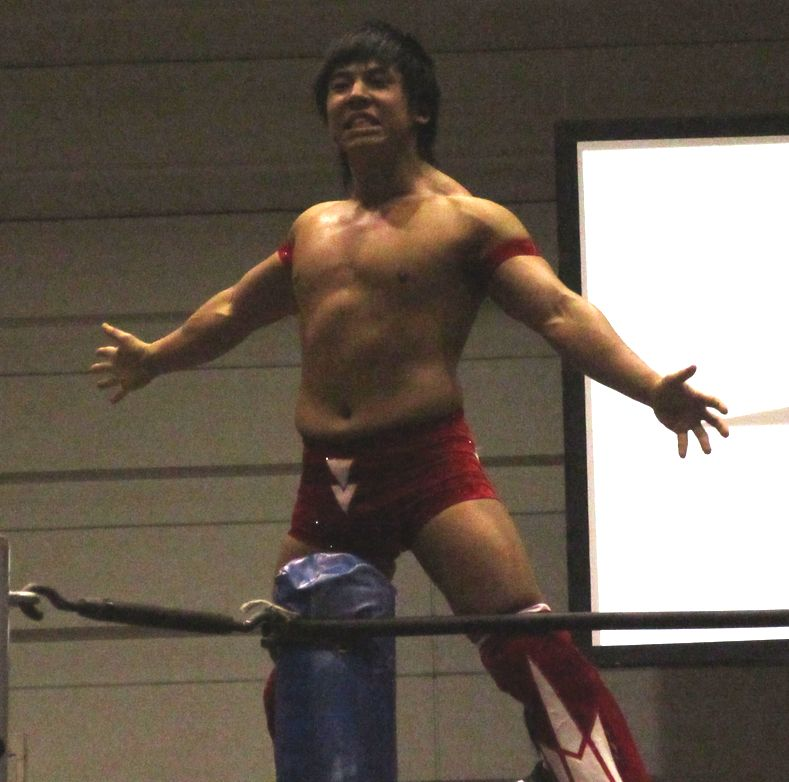
Nobuhiro Shimatani

- January 4 – Marika Kobashi and Yuu
- January 23 – Erika Watanabe
- January 30 – Rezar
- January 31 – Starboy Charlie
- February 13 – Mio Momono
- February 20 – Ahura
- March 5
  - Daiki Shimomura
  - Dominic Garrini
  - Nobuhiro Shimatani
- March 12 – Tequila Saya
- March 17 – Calvin Tankman
- March 20 – Alejandro
- March 23 – Myron Reed (wrestler)
- March 30
  - Hana Kimura
  - Seigo Tachibana
  - Jun Tonsho
- April 1 – Amber Nova
- April 5 – Takuya Nomura
- April 22 – H.Y.O
- April 29 – Austin Theory
- May 2 – Dragon Libre
- May 3 – Rin Kadokura
- June 16 – Maho Kurone
- June 25
  - AJ Gray
  - Matsuya Uno
  - Rhio
- July 8 – Tiger Ruas (NXT/Independents)
- July 21 – Yu Iizuka
- July 24 – Ibis Sara and RiNO
- August 5 – Masato Kamino
- August 6 – Kid Lykos II
- August 8 – Spike Trivet
- October 17 – Yuki Ueno
- October 29
  - So Daimonji
  - Yuki Yoshioka
  - Sean Legacy
- October 31 – Tetsuya Izuchi
- November 19 – Carbell Ito
- November 20 – Ruaka
- December 3 – Logan James
- December 4 – Naomi Yoshimura and Yuni
- December 11 – Junta Miyawaki
- December 25 – Kohei Kinoshita

== Retirements ==
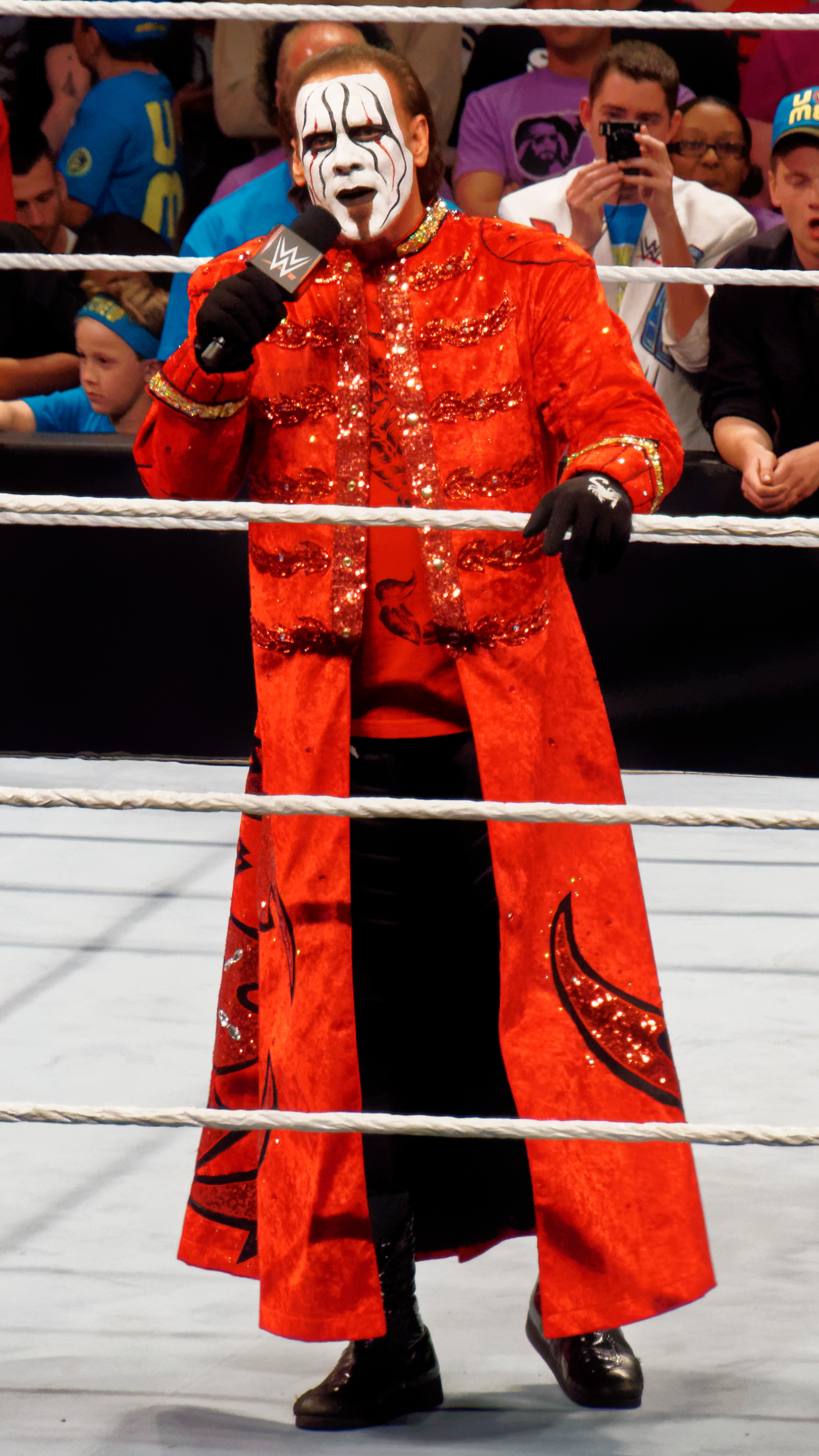
Sting

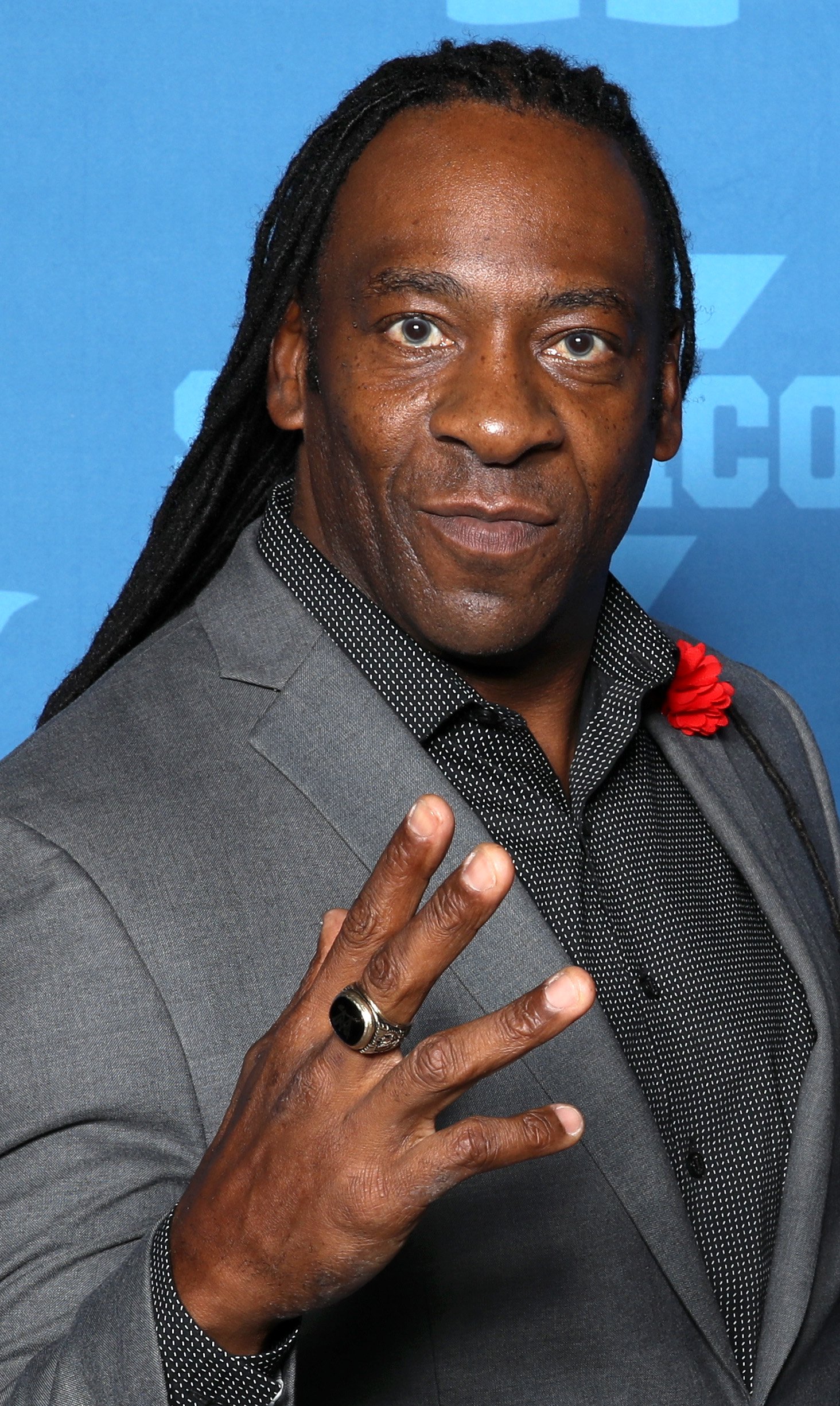
Booker T

- Tyson Tomko (2002–2016)
- Cliff Compton (1998–2016)
- Mark Mercedes (1992–2016)
- Mr. Pogo (March 20, 1972 – 2016)
- Daniel Bryan (December 1999 – February 8, 2016) (first retirement and became General Manager of SmackDown; on March 20, 2018, Bryan was formally cleared to return to full-time in-ring action and had his first match back at WrestleMania 34)
- The Grappler (1977 – March 5, 2016)
- Jim Neidhart (1978 – March 5, 2016)
- Bobby Eaton (May 1976 – March 19, 2016)
- Maki Narumiya (March 19, 2011 – March 25, 2016)
- Sting (November 28, 1985 – April 2, 2016) (first retirement; later debuted in All Elite Wrestling in December 2020 with a match at Revolution in 2021)
- Johnny Kidd (1978 – April 5, 2016, returned to wrestle in 2019)
- Brie Bella (September 15, 2007 – April 6, 2016) (semi, return in 2018)
- Cameron (July 7, 2011 – May 6, 2016) (full inactive, returned to wrestle AEW in July 2020)
- Necro Butcher (January 2, 1998 – June 11, 2016, returned to wrestling in 2018)
- Scott Hall (October 2, 1984 – June 17, 2016)
- Karsten Beck (2006 – July 2, 2016)
- Booker T (1989 – July 30, 2016)
- Scotty 2 Hotty (1989 – September 2016) (became a trainer for NXT and returned to wrestling in January 2022)
- Sara Lee (August 25, 2015 – September 30, 2016)
- Darryl Sharma (January 2002 – November 2016)
- D-Von Dudley (1991 – December 17, 2016)
- Kouhiro Kanemura (December 20, 1990 – December 27, 2016)
- Rabbit Miu (August 7, 2011 – December 28, 2016)

== Deaths ==
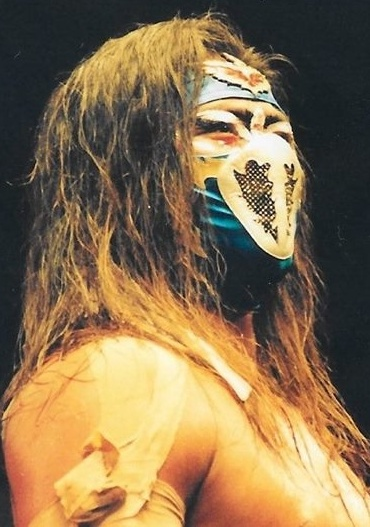
Hayabusa

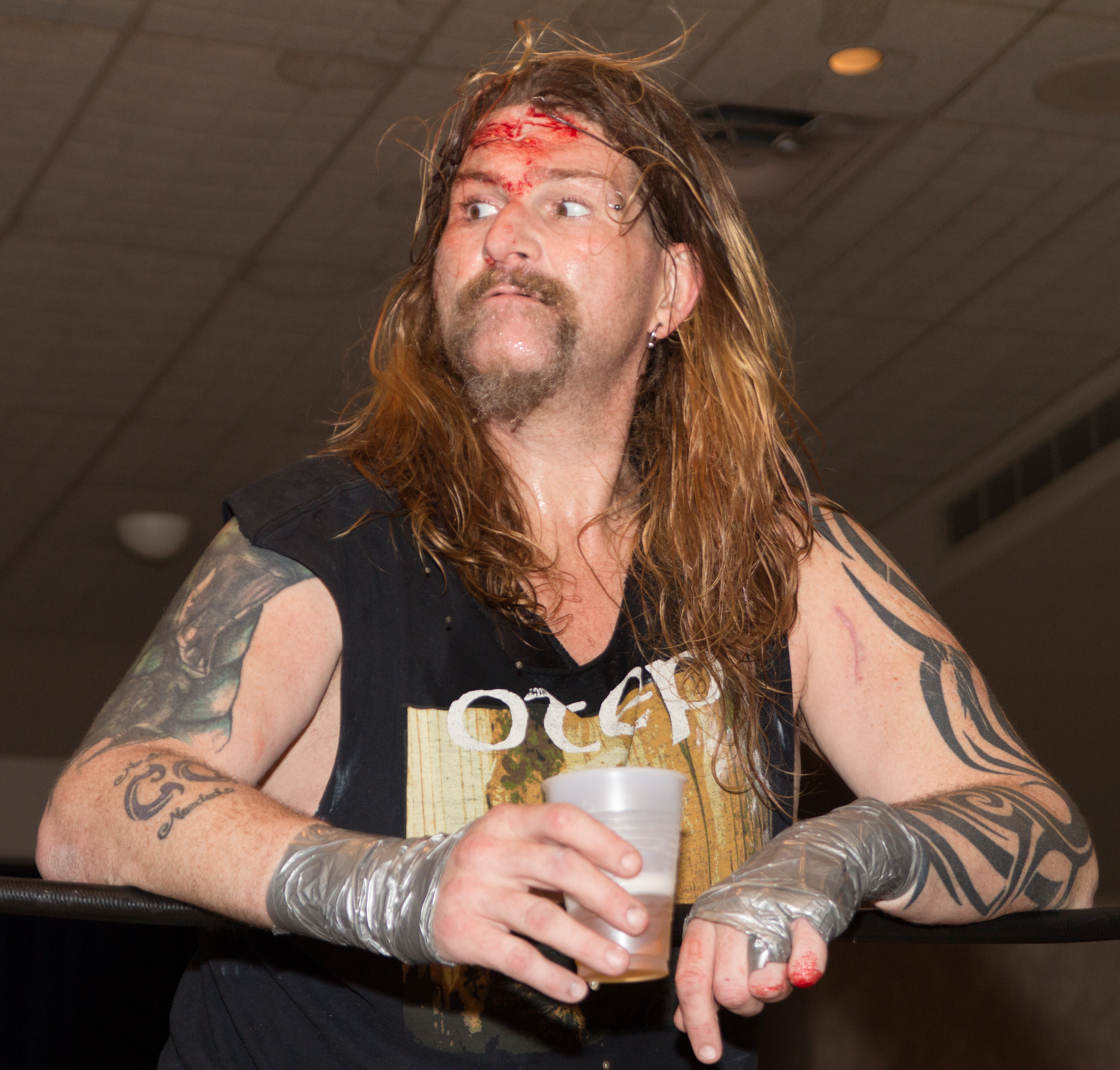
Balls Mahoney

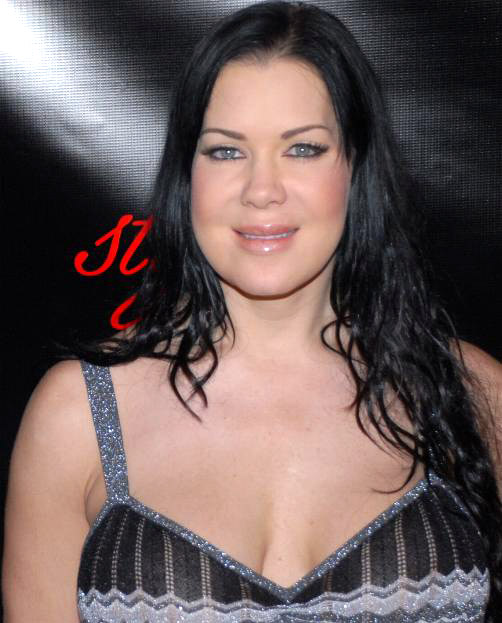
Chyna

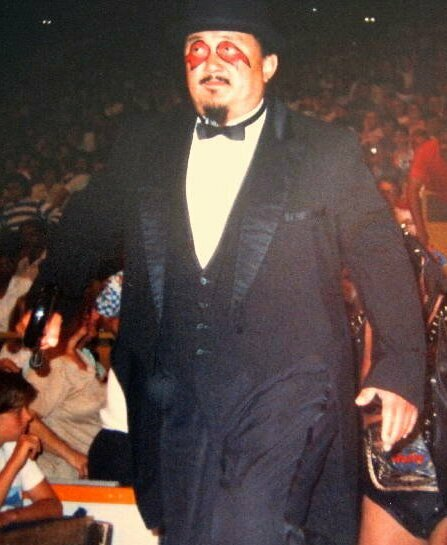
Mr Fuji

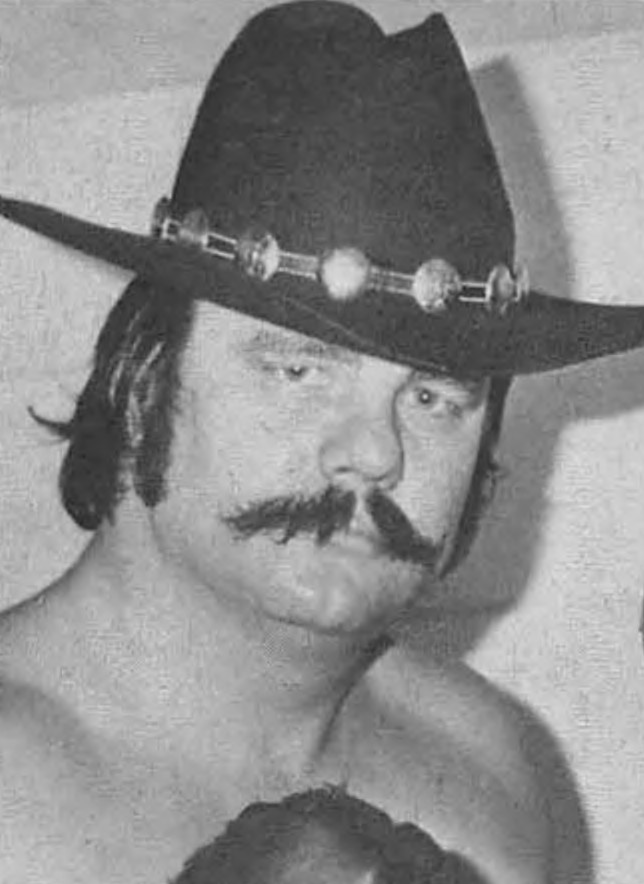
Blackjack Mulligan

- January 9 – Bob Leonard, 74
- January 10 – The Wolfman, 80
- January 17 – Mike Sharpe, 64
- January 23 –
  - Archie Gouldie, 79
  - Espectrito, 49
- January 27 – Taras Bulba, 59
- February 4 – Axl Rotten, 44
- February 10 – Tony Nardo (Moondog Spot), 51
- February 11 – Kevin Randleman, 44
- February 23 – Angel Gabriele, 59
- February 24 – Eddie Einhorn, 80
- February 25 – Mark Young, 48
- March 3 –
  - Hayabusa, 47
  - Lord James Blears, 92
- March 10 – Mike Flowers (Moondog Puppy Love)
- March 11 – Charlie Fulton, 67
- March 23 – Joe Garagiola, 90
- March 24 – Randal Brown, 64
- March 31 – Kris Travis, 32
- April 1:
  - Geoff Portz, 85
  - George Cavalaris, 84
- April 7 – Blackjack Mulligan, 73
- April 12 – Balls Mahoney, 44
- April 14 – Christin Able, 32
- April 20 – Chyna, 46
- May 6 – Billy Wicks, 84
- May 24:
  - Frankie Laine, 73
  - Buck Kartalian, 93
- June 6 - Dan Miller, 84
- June 15 – Gypsy Joe, 82
- June 30 – Thunder, 34
- July 3 – Muhammad Ali, 74
- August 4 – Jean Antone, 73
- August 28 – Mr. Fuji, 82
- September 9 – Lord Littlebrook, 87
- September 10 – Moose Morowski, 81
- September 16 – Don Bass, 70
- October 9 – El Mongol, 86
- October 21 – Frenchy Martin, 69
- November 18 – Ed Francis, 90
- November 28
  - Haruka Eigen, 70
  - John Cozman, 52
- December 9 – Mario Milano, 81
- December 15 – Harley Saito, 48
- December 22 – Mocho Cota, 62

== See also ==
- List of GFW events and specials
- List of NJPW pay-per-view events
- List of ROH pay-per-view events
- List of TNA pay-per-view events
- List of WWE Network events
- List of WWE pay-per-view events
