= Rey de Reyes (2015) =

2015 Lucha Libre AAA World Wide event

- Official poster for the Rey de Reyes show
- Promotion: Lucha Libre AAA World Wide
- Date: March 18, 2015
- City: Zapopan, Jalisco, Mexico
- Venue: Auditorio Benito Juarez
- Attendance: 2,500

Event chronology
← Previous; Guerra de Titanes	Next → Lucha Libre World Cup

Rey de Reyes chronology
← Previous; 2014	Next → 2016

Rey de Reyes (Spanish for "King of Kings") was a professional wrestling pay-per-view (PPV) event produced by the Lucha Libre AAA World Wide (AAA) promotion, which took place on March 18, 2015, at the Auditorio Benito Juarez arena in Zapopan, Jalisco, Mexico. The show was the 19th event held under the Rey de Reyes name and also the 19th time that the eponymous Rey de Reyes tournament was held. The show was originally scheduled for Sunday March 15, 2015 but due to weather and problems with getting paperwork in order the show was postponed to March 18 instead. The main event marked the first time that Rey Mysterio Jr. wrestled after leaving WWE earlier in 2015. Rey Mysterio Jr. teamed up with Myzteziz to take on the tag team of El Hijo del Perro Aguayo and Pentagón Jr. in the main event of the show. Due to the dates moving the originally scheduled match between El Patrón Alberto and Brian Cage was canceled, replaced with a match between Blue Demon Jr. and Villano IV.

== Production ==
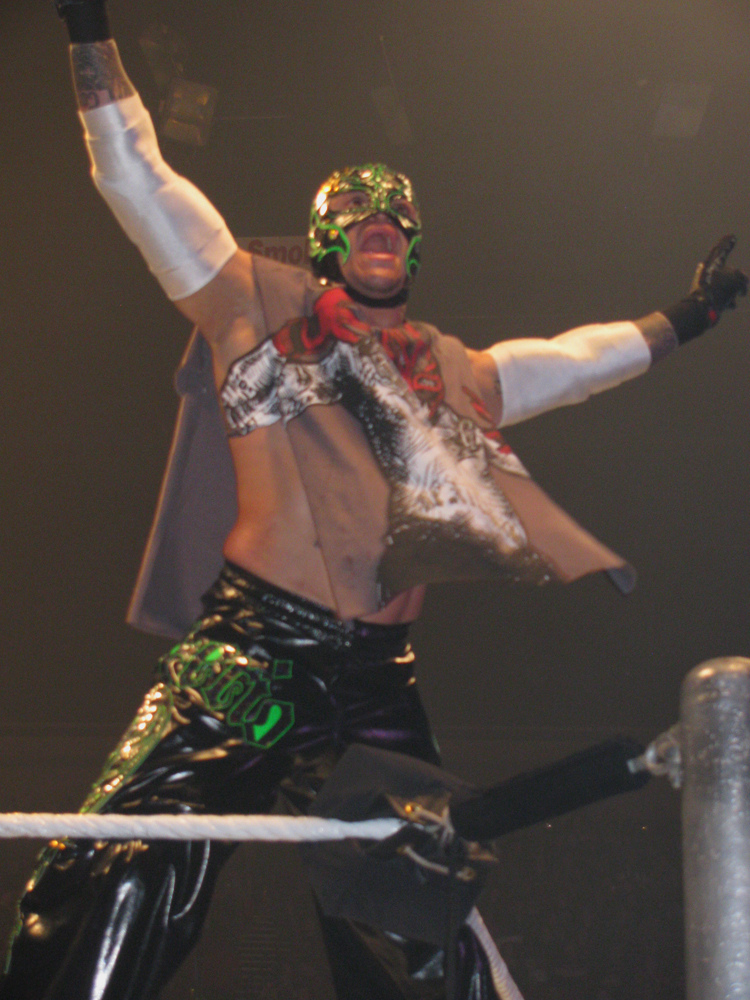
Rey Mysterio Jr., made his AAA return in the main event.

=== Background ===
Starting in 1997 and every year since then the Mexican Lucha Libre, or professional wrestling, company Lucha Libre AAA World Wide (AAA, or Triple A) has held a Rey de Reyes (Spanish for "King of Kings') show in the spring. The 1997 version was held in February, while all subsequent Rey de Reyes shows were held in March. As part of their annual Rey de Reyes event AAA holds the eponymious Rey de Reyes tournament to determine that specific year's Rey. Most years the show hosts both the qualifying round and the final match, but on occasion the qualifying matches have been held prior to the event as part of AAA's weekly television shows. The traditional format consists of four preliminary rounds, each a Four-man elimination match with each of the four winners face off in the tournament finals, again under elimination rules. There have been years where AAA has employed a different format to determine a winner. The winner of the Rey de Reyes tournament is given a large ornamental sword to symbolize their victory, but is normally not guaranteed any other rewards for winning the tournament, although some years becoming the Rey de Reyes has earned the winner a match for the AAA Mega Championship. From 1999 through 2009 AAA also held an annual Reina de Reinas ("Queen of Queens") tournament, but later turned that into an actual championship that could be defended at any point during the year, abandoning the annual tournament concept. The 2015 show was the 19th Rey de Reyes show in the series.

=== Storylines ===
The Rey de Reyes show featured eight professional wrestling matches with different wrestlers involved in pre-existing, scripted feuds, plots, and storylines. Wrestlers were portrayed as either heels (referred to as rudos in Mexico, those that portray the "bad guys") or faces (técnicos in Mexico, the "good guy" characters) as they followed a series of tension-building events, which culminated in a wrestling match or series of matches.

The Rey de Reyes show was originally scheduled to take place on March 15, 2015, at the Plaza de Toros Nuevo Progreso bullfighting arena in Guadalajara, Jalisco, however, when Guadalajara was hit with a rainstorm, AAA postponed the event for 24 hours and moved it indoors to Auditorio Benito Juarez in Zapopan, Jalisco. The following day AAA announced that they were not able to get all permits in time for the show due to it being a national holiday, and once again postponed the show to Wednesday March 18 instead. At the same time they announced that the announced match between El Patrón Alberto and Brian Cage had been cancelled. El Patrón Alberto later stated that he was legally obligated to compete in Australia later in the week and thus was not able to work the Wednesday show for AAA. After the March 16 show was postponed most of the wrestlers and AAA staff traveled back to Mexico by bus. During the trip one of the buses crashed into a stalled truck in Zinapécuaro, Michoacán, killing one member of the AAA staff, Irma Osorno, while several other staff members were either taken to a hospital or received medical attention at the scene of the accident. Due to the tragic accident AAA dedicated the entire show to the memory of Irma Osorno.

== Results ==
No.	Results	Stipulations
1	Venum and Ludxor defeated El Apache and Carta Brava Jr.	Tag team match
2	Mascarita Sagrada, Pimpinela Escarlata and Faby Apache defeated Mini Abismo Negro, Black Mamba and Taya	Six-person tag team match
3	Bengala, Drago and Súper Nova defeated Daga, El Hijo de Pirata Morgan and Súper Fly	Six-man tag team match
4	El Hijo del Fantasma (c) defeated Fénix	Singles match for the AAA World Cruiserweight Championship
5	Blue Demon Jr. defeated Villano IV	Singles match
6	La Parka and Los Güeros del Cielo (Angélico and Jack Evans) defeated Los Hell Brothers (Averno, Chessman and Cibernético)	Six-man tag team match
7	El Texano Jr. defeated Aero Star, Psycho Clown and El Mesías	Four-way elimination 2015 Rey de Reyes tournament final match
8	Myzteziz and Rey Mysterio Jr. defeated El Hijo del Perro Aguayo and Pentagón Jr.	Tag team match
(c) / – the champion(s) heading into the match

=== Tournament bracket ===
1st Round; Sin Limite; January 23 – February 27, 2015 (Aired: January 31 – March 7)
Aero Star	Win (Note: This was a four-way elimination match.)
Hijo de Pirata Morgan	—
Monster Clown	—
Super Fly	—
Cibernético	—
El Mesías	Win (Note: Order of elimination: Cibernético and La Parka by double countout, La Parka Negra)
La Parka	—
La Parka Negra	—
Cuervo	—
Electroshock	—
El Zorro	—
Psycho Clown	Win (Note: Order of elimination: Electroshock by disqualification, Cuervo by countout, El Zorro)
Bengala	—
El Texano Jr.	Win (Note: Order of elimination: Machine Rocker, Bengala, Murder Clown)
Machine Rocker	—
Murder Clown	—

Final; Rey de Reyes; March 18, 2015
Aero Star	—
El Mesías	—
Psycho Clown	—
El Texano Jr.	Win (Note: Order of elimination: Aero Star, El Mesías, Psycho Clown)
