= Guerra de Titanes (2016) =

2016 Lucha Libre AAA World Wide event

- Official poster for the show
- Promotion: Lucha Libre AAA World Wide
- Date: January 22, 2016
- City: Zapopan, Jalisco, Mexico
- Venue: Auditorio "Benito Juarez"

Pay-per-view chronology
← Previous; Héroes Inmortales IX	Next → Rey de Reyes

Guerra de Titanes chronology
← Previous; 2014	Next → 2017

Guerra de Titanes (Spanish for "War of the Titans") is a major professional wrestling event produced by Lucha Libre AAA World Wide (AAA), a Mexican promotion. The event was originally announced for December 5, 2015, but was postponed to January 22, 2016, with no official explanation for the delay. The event is the nineteenth Guerra de Titanes show, traditionally AAA's "end of the year" that started in 1997, breaking with tradition in 2016.

The main event of the show was the semi-final round of a tournament to determine the next AAA Mega Champion in a match where the winning team will earn their way to the finals, held at the 2016 Rey de Reyes event. The team of Dr. Wagner Jr. and Psycho Clown lost against El Mesías and El Texano Jr. Dark Cuervo, Dark Scoria and El Zorro won in a Six-man Lucha Libre rules tag team match for the vacant AAA World Trios Championship. The Los Hell Brothers Averno and Chessman won in a Three-way elimination match for the AAA World Tag Team Championship.

== Production ==
=== Background ===
Starting in 1997 the Mexican professional wrestling, company AAA has held a major wrestling show late in the year, either November or December, called Guerra de Titanes ("War of the Titans"). The show often features championship matches or Lucha de Apuestas or bet matches where the competitors risked their wrestling mask or hair on the outcome of the match. In Lucha Libre the Lucha de Apuetas match is considered more prestigious than a championship match and a lot of the major shows feature one or more Apuesta matches. The Guerra de Titanes show is hosted by a new location each year, emanating from cities such as Madero, Chihuahua, Chihuahua, Mexico City, Guadalajara, Jalisco and more.

AAA had originally announced that they would hold the 2015 Guerra de Titane on December 4, 2015, and announced the full show, including a match for the vacant AAA Mega Championship. On November 25, AAA announced that the planned show had been cancelled, without a replacement date mentioned at the time of cancellation or any sort of official explanation of the reasons behind the cancellation. On December 23, AAA announced that the Guerra de Titanes show would take place on January 22, 2016. The full six match show was announced on January 6, 2016.

=== Storylines ===
The Guerra de Titanes show featured six professional wrestling matches with different wrestlers involved in pre-existing, scripted feuds, plots, and storylines. Wrestlers were viewed as either heels (referred to as rudos in Mexico, those that portray the "bad guys") or faces (técnicos in Mexico, the "good guy" characters) as they followed a series of tension-building events, which culminated in a wrestling match or series of matches.

El Patrón Alberto defeated El Texano Jr. to win the AAA Mega Championship at the 2014 Guerra de Titanes show. Over the next year El Patrón defended the championship on several occasions, until he signed a contract with WWE in late 2015, which led to AAA announcing that since the WWE would not allow El Patrón to defend the championship it was vacated and they would hold a tournament to determine a new champion. When the original Guerra de Titans was announced for December 3, 2015, AAA revealed that they had booked Rey Mysterio Jr. against Johnny Mundo in a match for the vacant championship. AAA later cancelled the show and moved it to January 2016. When AAA finally unveiled the actual matches for the Guerra de Titanes show neither Rey Mysterio Jr. nor Johnny Mundo were featured, instead the main event of the show was announced as a tag team match where the winning team would qualify for the finals of a tournament for the vacant AAA Mega Championship to be held at the 2016 Rey de Reyes show. One side would be former two time Mega Champion Dr. Wagner Jr. and reigning AAA Latin American Champion Psycho Clown facing off against former three time Mega Champion El Mesías and one time Mega champion El Texano Jr. None of the competitors had been involved directly with each other leading up to the show, although previous storyline feuds between Psycho Clown and El Texano Jr. as well as between Dr. Wagner Jr. and El Mesías did exist.

The semi-final match of the show would also be for a vacated AAA championship, in this case the AAA World Trios Championship. On June 15, 2015, Los Hell Brothers (Averno, Chessman and Cibernético) defeated Los Psycho Circus (Monster Clown, Murder Clown and Psycho Clown) to win the Trios championship. In late 2015 Cibernético decided to leave AAA, forcing AAA to vacate the championship. The match for the vacant Trios championship had included three teams of three, where none of the teams had actually teamed up on a regular basis prior to Guerra de Titanes, the rudo trio of Dark Cuervo, Dark Escoria and El Zorro defeated Electroshock, La Parka and Garza Jr. and the trio of El Hijo de Pirata Morgan, El Hijo del Fantasma and Taurus.

== Results ==
No.	Results	Stipulations
1	Dinastía, Niño Hamburguesa and Pimpinela Escarlata defeated Gran Apache, Mamba and Mini Charly Manson	Relevos Tríos de Locura match
2	Lady Shani, Keira and Taya defeated Faby Apache, Goya Kong and Maravilla	Lumberjack Strap match
3	Fireball, Australian Suicide and Jack Evans defeated Daga, Parka Negra and Súper Fly	Six-man "Lucha Libre rules" tag team match
4	Los Hell Brothers (Averno and Chessman) defeated Aerostar and Fénix and Máscara Año 2000 Jr. and Villano IV	Three-way elimination match for the vacant AAA World Tag Team Championship
5	Dark Cuervo, Dark Scoria and El Zorro defeated Electroshock, Garza Jr. and La Parka and El Hijo de Pirata Morgan, Hijo del Fantasma and Taurus	Six-man Lucha Libre rules tag team match for the vacant AAA World Trios Championship
6	El Mesías and El Texano Jr. defeated Dr. Wagner Jr. and Psycho Clown	Tag team match, AAA Mega Championship tournament semi-final

=== AAA Mega Championship Tournament bracket ===
1st Round; Sin Limite: Guerra de Titanes; January 22, 2016 (Aired: January 30)
Dr. Wagner Jr. and Psycho Clown	—
El Mesías and El Texano Jr.	Win

Final; Sin Limite: Rey de Reyes; March 23, 2016 (Aired: April 2)
El Mesías	12:17
El Texano Jr.	Win

== See also ==
- 2016 in professional wrestling
