= Guerra de Titanes (2014) =

2014 Lucha Libre AAA World Wide event

- Official poster of the event.
- Promotion: Lucha Libre AAA World Wide
- Date: December 7, 2014
- City: Zapopan, Jalisco, Mexico
- Venue: Auditorio "Benito Juarez"

Pay-per-view chronology
← Previous; Héroes Inmortales VIII	Next → Rey de Reyes

Guerra de Titanes chronology
← Previous; 2013	Next → 2016

Guerra de Titanes (Spanish for "War of the Titans") was a professional wrestling pay-per-view (PPV) event produced by the Lucha Libre AAA World Wide (AAA) promotion, which took place on December 7, 2014, in Zapopan, Jalisco, Mexico . The event was the eighteenth Guerra de Titanes end of the year show promoted by AAA since 1997. The announced main event was the AAA Mega Champion El Texano Jr. defending the championship against El Patrón Alberto.

== Production ==
=== Background ===
Starting in 1997 the Mexican professional wrestling, company Lucha Libre AAA World Wide (AAA, or Triple A) has held a major wrestling show late in the year, either November or December, called Guerra de Titanes ("War of the Titans"). The show often features championship matches or Lucha de Apuestas or bet matches where the competitors risked their wrestling mask or hair on the outcome of the match. In Lucha Libre the Lucha de Apuetas match is considered more prestigious than a championship match and a lot of the major shows feature one or more Apuesta matches. The Guerra de Titanes show is hosted by a new location each year, emanating from cities such as Madero, Chihuahua, Chihuahua, Mexico City, Guadalajara, Jalisco and more. The 2014 Guerra de Titanes show was the seventeenth show in the series.

=== Storylines ===
The Guerra de Titanes show featured sixprofessional wrestling matches with different wrestlers involved in pre-existing, scripted feuds, plots, and storylines. Wrestlers were portrayed as either heels (referred to as rudos in Mexico, those that portray the "bad guys") or faces (técnicos in Mexico, the "good guy" characters) as they followed a series of tension-building events, which culminated in a wrestling match or series of matches.

== Results ==
No.	Results	Stipulations
1	Dinastía (c) defeated Mini Charly Manson	Singles match for the AAA World Mini-Estrella Championship
2	Sexy Star and Taya defeated Faby Apache and Ivelisse	Tag team match
3	Los Perros del Mal (Joe Líder and Pentagón Jr.) defeated Los Güeros del Cielo (Angélico and Jack Evans) (c) and Fénix and Myzteziz	Three-way tag team match for the AAA World Tag Team Championship
4	Los Psycho Circus (Monster Clown, Murder Clown and Psycho Clown) (c) defeated Los Hell Brothers (Averno, Chessman and Cibernético)	Six-man tag team match for the AAA World Trios Championship
5	Aero Star (with Niño Hamburguesa) defeated Súper Fly (with El Hijo del Fantasma)	Lucha de Apuestas, Mask vs. Mask
6	El Patrón Alberto (with El Mesías) defeated El Texano Jr. (c) (with El Hijo del Perro Aguayo)	Singles match for the AAA Mega Championship
(c) / – the champion(s) heading into the match
