= Rey de Reyes (2016) =

2016 Lucha Libre AAA World Wide event

- Official Rey de Reyes poster featuring (from left to right) Psycho Clown, El Mesías, El Texano Jr. and Dr. Wagner Jr.
- Promotion: Lucha Libre AAA World Wide
- Date: March 23, 2016
- City: San Luis Potosí, San Luis Potosí, Mexico
- Venue: Plaza de Toros Monumental El Paseo
- Attendance: 7,000

Event chronology
← Previous; Guerra de Titanes	Next → Lucha Libre World Cup

Rey de Reyes chronology
← Previous; 2015	Next → 2017

Rey de Reyes (2016) (Spanish for "King of Kings") was a professional wrestling event produced by the Lucha Libre AAA World Wide (AAA) promotion. The event was originally announced for March 11, 2016 in Tampico, Tamaulipas, but was later rescheduled to March 23, 2016 in San Luis Potosí, San Luis Potosí with no official explanation given for the move. The show was the 20th event held under the Rey de Reyes name and also the 20th time that the eponymous Rey de Reyes tournament was held. At the 2016 Guerra de Titanes El Texano Jr. and El Mesías earned the rights to wrestle for the vacant AAA Mega Championship.

== Production ==
=== Background ===
Starting in 1997 and every year since then the Mexican Lucha Libre, or professional wrestling, company AAA has held a Rey de Reyes (Spanish for "King of Kings') show in the spring. The 1997 version was held in February, while all subsequent Rey de Reyes shows were held in March. As part of their annual Rey de Reyes event AAA holds the eponymious Rey de Reyes tournament to determine that specific year's Rey. Most years the show hosts both the qualifying round and the final match, but on occasion the qualifying matches have been held prior to the event as part of AAA's weekly television shows. The traditional format consists of four preliminary rounds, each a Four-man elimination match with each of the four winners face off in the tournament finals, again under elimination rules. There have been years where AAA has employed a different format to determine a winner. The winner of the Rey de Reyes tournament is given a large ornamental sword to symbolize their victory, but is normally not guaranteed any other rewards for winning the tournament, although some years becoming the Rey de Reyes has earned the winner a match for the AAA Mega Championship. From 1999 through 2009 AAA also held an annual Reina de Reinas ("Queen of Queens") tournament, but later turned that into an actual championship that could be defended at any point during the year, abandoning the annual tournament concept. The 2016 show will be the 20th Rey de Reyes show in the series.

=== Storylines ===
The 2016 Rey de Reyes show featured an undisclosed number of professional wrestling matches with different wrestlers involved in pre-existing, scripted feuds, plots, and storylines. Wrestlers were portrayed as either heels (referred to as rudos in Mexico, those that portray the "bad guys") or faces (técnicos in Mexico, the "good guy" characters) as they followed a series of tension-building events, which culminated in a wrestling match or series of matches.

== Results ==
No.	Results	Stipulations
1	Octagón Jr, Faby Apache, Mascarita Sagrada and Pimpinela Escarlata defeated Mamba, Mini Psycho Clown, Taurus and Taya	Relevos Atómicos de Locura match
2	Dark Cuervo, Dark Scoria and El Zorro (c) defeated Aero Star, Drago and Fénix	Trios match for the AAA World Trios Championship
3	Los Hell Brothers (Averno and Chessman) (c) defeated Los Perros del Mal (Daga and Joe Líder) and Australian Suicide and Argenis	Tables, Ladders, and Chairs match for the AAA World Tag Team Championship
4	Pentagon Jr. defeated Villano IV and La Parka	2016 Rey de Reyes tournament finals
5	Dr. Wagner Jr. defeated Psycho Clown	Singles match
6	El Texano Jr. defeated El Mesías	Single match for the vacant AAA Mega Championship
(c) / – the champion(s) heading into the match

=== Rey de Reyes tournament bracket ===
1st Round; Sin Limite; February 6 – March 4, 2016 (Aired: February 13 – March 12)
Blue Demon Jr.	Win (Note: This was a four-way elimination match.) (Note: Order of elimination: Garza Jr., Taurus, Dr. Wagner Jr.)
Dr. Wagner Jr.	—
Garza Jr.	—
Taurus	—
Chessman	—
Electroshock	—
Jack Evans	—
Villano IV	Win (Note: Order of elimination: Jack Evans, Chessman, Electroshock)
Averno	—
El Zorro	—
La Parka	Win (Note: Order of elimination: Averno, Psycho Clown, El Zorro)
Psycho Clown	—
El Hijo del Fantasma	—
Fénix	—
Octagón Jr.	—
Pentagon Jr.	Win (Note: Order of elimination: Fénix, El Hijo del Fantasma, Pentagon Jr.)

Final; Sin Limite: Rey de Reyes; March 23, 2016 (Aired: April 9)
Blue Demon Jr.	N/A (Note: Blue Demon Jr. was unexplainably absent from the show.)
Villano IV	—
La Parka	—
Pentagón Jr.	Win (Note: This was a three-way elimination match. Order of elimination: La Parka, Villano IV)

=== AAA Mega Championship Tournament bracket ===
1st Round; Sin Limite: Guerra de Titanes; January 22, 2016 (Aired: January 30)
Dr. Wagner Jr. and Psycho Clown	—
El Mesías and El Texano Jr.	Win

Final; Sin Limite: Rey de Reyes; March 23, 2016 (Aired: April 2)
El Mesías	12:17
El Texano Jr.	Win
