= Averno (wrestler) =

Mexican professional wrestler (born 1977)

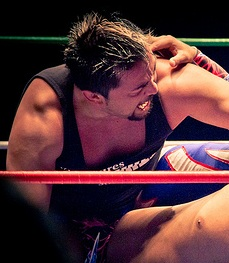
- Averno after he was unmasked

Personal information
- Born: Renato Ruíz Cortes; May 9, 1977 (age 49) Mexico City, Distrito Federal, Mexico

Professional wrestling career
- Ring name(s): Averno; Rencor Latino
- Billed height: 1.75 m (5 ft 9 in)
- Billed weight: 79 kg (174 lb)
- Billed from: Mexico City, Mexico
- Trained by: Rodolfo Ruíz; Shadito Cruz; Felipe Ham Lee; El Satánico
- Debut: October 18, 1995

Renato Ruíz Cortes (born May 9, 1977), better known by his ring name Averno (English: "Hell"), is a Mexican professional wrestler. He is signed to Consejo Mundial de Lucha Libre (CMLL), where is a member of the Los Infernales stable and the current NWA World Historic Light Heavyweight Champion in his first reign.

He debuted for CMLL in 1995 as Rencor Latino ("Latin Hostility"), but did not achieve any significant success until adopting the ring name Averno in 2001 and joining Los Infernales. A founding member of Los Hijos del Averno alongside Mephisto and Ephesto, Averno was a one-time CMLL World Middleweight Champion, NWA World Middleweight Champion, NWA World Historic Middleweight Champion, Mexican National Welterweight Champion and Mexican National Trios Champion, two-time CMLL World Trios Champion, and three-time CMLL World Tag Team Champion.

Ruíz left CMLL in April 2014 and joined rival promotion Lucha Libre AAA Worldwide (AAA) the following month, where he was a one-time AAA World Tag Team Champion and three-time AAA World Trios Champion. He left AAA in early 2021 and returned to CMLL that same year, where he has since won the CMLL World Light Heavyweight Championship and the 2023 Torneo Nacional de Parejas Increíbles with Místico. Averno has also wrestled for Total Nonstop Action Wrestling (TNA), where he won the 2008 World X Cup as part of Team Mexico, New Japan Pro-Wrestling (NJPW) and Major League Wrestling (MLW).

== Personal life ==
Renato Ruíz Cortes was born on May 9, 1977, in Mexico City. The son of professional wrestler Rodolfo Ruíz, he began training for a professional wrestling career under his father, who by then had retired from in-ring competition and worked as a referee and trainer, as well as El Satánico, Felipe Ham Lee and Shadito Cruz. However, his father did not want him to become a wrestler and suggested he focus on his studies, intentionally making their training sessions brutal as a result; Ruíz recalled leaving the gym in tears two or three times.

== Professional wrestling career ==
=== Consejo Mundial de Lucha Libre (1995–2014) ===
==== Rencor Latino (1995–2001) ====
Ruíz made his in-ring debut on October 18, 1995, teaming with his father in a loss to Cassandro and Guerrero Star. Using the ring name Rencor Latino ("Latin Hostility"), he started out as a técnico (good guy) in the lower ranks of Consejo Mundial de Lucha Libre (CMLL), eventually winning his first Lucha de Apuestas ("bet match") on June 19, 1998, by unmasking Apolo Chino following a midcard feud. On February 27, 1999, he lost to Masato Yakushiji in a match to determine the inaugural CMLL Japan Super Lightweight Champion. At the CMLL 66th Anniversary Show on September 24, Latino, Violencia and Virus lost to Starman, Super Astro and Tony Rivera. On August 4, 2000, at the Entre Torre Infernal ("In the Infernal Tower") pay-per-view, Latino defeated veteran El Hijo del Gladiador in a Lucha de Apuestas to win his mask after being the final two wrestlers in a torneo cibernetico. In early 2001, he underwent minor surgery on his left hand, but did not miss a significant amount of time out of the ring. At Juicio Final ("Final Judgement") on March 30, he, Arkangel de la Muerte and Veneno lost to Astro Rey Jr., El Felino and Pantera.

==== Los Infernales (2001–2006) ====
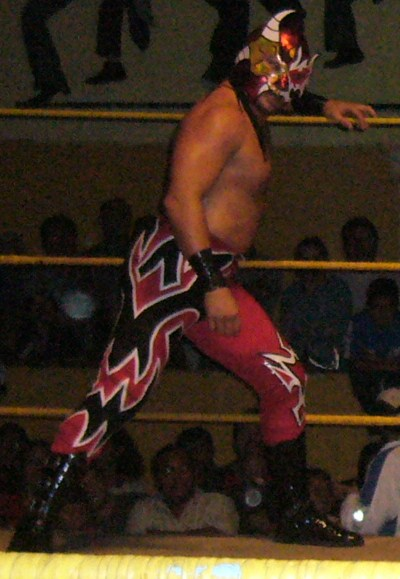
Ruíz wearing a half Averno/half Rencor Latino mask in 2005

In the summer of 2001, El Satánico, who was feuding with former Los Infernales ("The Infernals") stablemates Último Guerrero, Rey Bucanero and Tarzan Boy, recruited him to be a part of the new incarnation of Los Infernales and feud with the splinter group. During a televised segment, Satánico used his supposed "satanic powers" to turn Latino into one of his "minions", a rúdo (bad guy) character known as "Averno" ("Hell"), and Astro Rey Jr. into Mephisto. Ruíz' previous identity was publicly acknowledged, as he occasionally wrestled wearing a special half Averno and Rencor Latino mask. When Tarzan Boy was injured and unable to wrestle, Bucanero and Guerrero recruited Máscara Mágica to even the numbers. The storyline between the two factions culminated when all seven wrestlers fought in a steel cage match at the CMLL 68th Anniversary Show on September 28, where the winning side would gain the rights to the Los Infernales name. In the end, Satánico pinned Mágica to gain the rights and his mask. On June 23, 2002, Los Infernales won the Mexican National Trios Championship from Olímpico, Mr. Niebla and Safari, which they lost to La Familia de Tijuana (Nicho el Millonario, Halloween and Damián 666) on September 27. Shortly after, Averno and Mephisto turned on Satánico and split from the group, venturing out on their own.

On September 3, 2004, Averno defeated Zumbido to win the vacant NWA World Middleweight Championship. On January 1, 2005, Averno lost the title to Místico, from then on being positioned as his rival or foil; their rivalry and matches received critical acclaim. At Homenaje a Dos Leyendas ("Homage to Two Legends") on March 18, Averno, Mephisto and Bucanero defeated Atlantis, Blue Panther and Negro Casas. On April 1, Averno and Mephisto defeated Atlantis and Blue Panther to win the CMLL World Tag Team Championship. In early 2006, Averno and Mephisto retained the title twice against Místico and Black Warrior, the latter after Warrior turned on Místico. Their 377-day reign ended in a loss to Místico and Casas on April 14. On September 17, Averno defeated Casas for the CMLL World Middleweight Championship. At the CMLL 73rd Anniversary Show on September 29, he, Alex Koslov and Mephisto defeated El Felino, El Sagrado and Último Dragón.

==== Los Hijos del Averno (2006–2014) ====
In December, Averno, Mephisto and Ephesto formed Los Hijos del Averno ("The Sons of Hell"), initially known as La Triada del Terror ("The Trio of Terror"). He regained the NWA World Middleweight Championship from Místico on November 30, 2007, retaining it against him on January 28, 2008. On February 1, Averno and Mephisto defeated Atlantis and Guerrero for their second CMLL World Tag Team Championship, but lost it to Místico and Héctor Garza on March 10. When the commission declared the title vacant after a match ended in a double disqualification, the two teams fought for the vacant title on May 23, which Místico and Garza won. They regained the title on December 7, losing it to La Sombra and Volador Jr. on January 16, 2009. At Homenaje a Dos Leyendas on March 20, Los Hijos del Averno defeated Blue Panther, El Sagrado and Toscano. On May 29, he retained the NWA World Middleweight Championship against Blue Panther. Averno's champion status made him a participant in the Universal Championship tournament on June 5, defeating Dragón Rojo Jr. in the first round before losing to La Sombra in the quarter-finals. He lost the CMLL World Middleweight Championship to El Hijo del Fantasma on July 21. Los Hijos del Averno lost to La Máscara, La Sombra and Volador Jr. at the CMLL 76th Anniversary Show on September 18. The following week, he and Pólvora lost to Ángel de Plata and Garza in the first round of the Torneo Gran Alternativa ("Great Alternative Tournament"), in which a rookie teams with a veteran. Averno made further successful title defenses against Volador Jr. on October 23 and November 30.

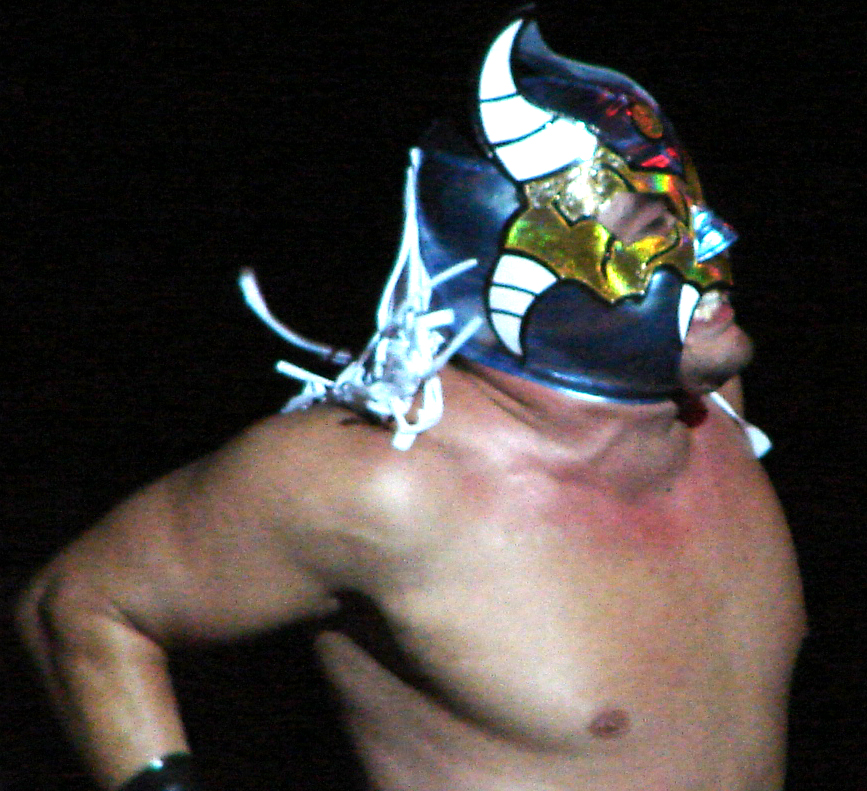
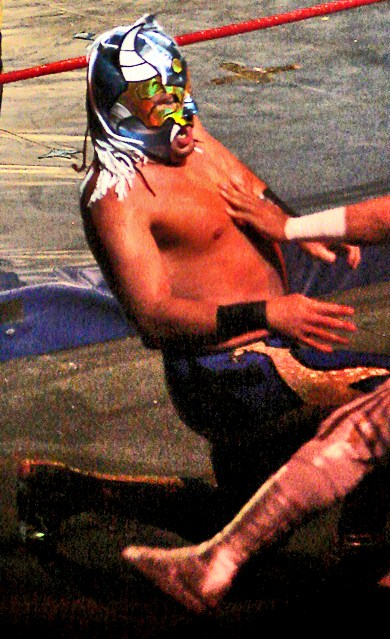
Averno in 2006

On January 22, 2010, Averno and técnico Místico participated in the Torneo Nacional de Parejas Increíbles ("National Incredible Pairs Tournament"), wearing matching outfits. After defeating Euforia and Ephesto in the first round and El Terrible and Volador Jr. in the quarter-finals, they lost to Atlantis and Máscara Dorada in the semi-finals. He was paired with Raziel for that year's Torneo Gran Alternativa on April 23, defeating Guerrero Maya Jr. and Valiente in the first round, but lost to Delta and Volador Jr. in the quarter-finals. At the Promociones Gutiérrez 1st Anniversary Show on July 12, Averno and Guerrero were one of five pareja increibles teams who put their mask on the line, with the losing team being forced to wrestle each other for their masks, facing Atlantis and Olímpico, El Oriental and Místico, Histeria and La Sombra and El Alebrije and Volador Jr.; they were the third team to escape the match. He lost to Guerrero in the first round of the Universal Championship tournament on July 30. The next month, following complaints from the National Wrestling Alliance (NWA), CMLL abandoned the NWA World Middleweight Championship and made Averno the inaugural NWA World Historic Middleweight Champion. Averno was one of fourteen men putting their mask on the line in a steel cage Lucha de Apuestas in the main event of the CMLL 77th Anniversary Show on September 3, being the first man to escape the cage. On December 17, Averno entered the La Copa Junior ("The Junior Cup") tournament, defeating El Hijo del Fantasma and Místico en route to the following week's finals, which Dragón Rojo Jr. won. At Homenaje a Dos Leyendas on March 18, 2011, he retained the title against Dorada after Mephisto's interference. Averno and Palacio Negro were disqualified against Dorada and Metal Blanco in the semi-finals of the Torneo Gran Alternativa on April 1 when Averno unmasked Dorada.

During this time, Averno feuded with La Máscara, leading the two to sign a contract on May 26 for a mask vs. mask Lucha de Apuestas at Juicio Final on June 17. Three days later, it was reported that Averno had signed a contract with WWE, where he was set to revive his feud with Místico. He publicly denied the rumors of his signing and a tryout that took place in October 2010, but confirmed there were talks between him and WWE. While his father said the rumors were true, Averno opted to remain with CMLL. Averno was defeated at Juicio Final, thus being forced to unmask and reveal his identity, Renato Ruíz Cortes. Both men subsequently continued their feud, with Averno retaining the NWA World Historic Middleweight Championship against La Máscara on July 4. On July 15, Los Hijos del Averno defeated La Generación Dorada (Dorada, La Máscara and La Sombra) for the CMLL World Trios Championship. He successfully defended his title in a rematch later that month. He entered the Universal Championship tournament on September 9, respectively defeating Virus, La Máscara and Guerrero to advance to the finals, which he lost the following week to La Sombra. Averno lost his title to La Máscara on November 22. The rivals were forced to team in the Torneo Nacional de Parejas Increíbles on February 17, 2012, first defeating Olímpico and Valiente before losing to Atlantis and Mr. Niebla in the quarter-finals. Two days later, Los Hijos del Averno lost their title to El Bufete del Amor (Marco Corleone, Máximo and Rush). On November 16, he failed to win Titán's Mexican National Welterweight Championship. Averno and La Máscara were paired for the same tournament on March 1, 2013, defeating El Hijo del Fantasma and El Felino in the first round before losing to La Sombra and Volador Jr. in the quarter-finals.

After surviving a torneo cibernetico alongside Místico II, Averno defeated him on April 26 to capture the vacant Mexican National Welterweight Championship. He unsuccessfully challenged Dorada for the NWA World Historic Welterweight Championship on June 18. Averno made his first successful title defense against Titán on July 9. He lost to Rey Escorpión in the first round of the Universal Championship tournament on August 23. On September 13, at the CMLL 80th Anniversary Show, Averno won a submission only Lucha de Apuestas against Blue Panther, who was forced to have all his hair shaved off. He lost the title to Titán on December 1. On January 6, 2014, Averno unsuccessfully challenged Volador Jr. for the NWA World Historic Welterweight Championship. They were paired for the Torneo Nacional de Parejas Increíbles on March 7, defeating Ephesto and La Máscara in the first round before losing to Guerrero and La Sombra in the quarter-finals. On April 8, Averno failed to win Místico II's CMLL World Welterweight Championship. On April 28, CMLL officially announced Averno's departure.

=== Total Nonstop Action Wrestling (2008) ===
In 2008, Averno participated in Total Nonstop Action Wrestling (TNA)'s World X Cup Tournament, joining Rey Bucanero, Último Guerrero and Volador Jr. as part of "Team Mexico". His only match was a twelve-man three tag team elimination match at Victory Road on July 13, where Averno was the fourth wrestler eliminated by Team Japan's Masato Yoshino. Later that night, Volador Jr. won an Ultimate X match, earning enough points for Team Mexico to win the entire tournament.

=== New Japan Pro-Wrestling (2009–2012) ===
Averno made his New Japan Pro-Wrestling (NJPW) debut at Wrestle Kingdom III on January 4, 2009, teaming with Gedo and Jado in a loss to Místico and Apollo 55 (Prince Devitt and Ryusuke Taguchi). Exactly a year later, he and Guerrero unsuccessfully challenged Apollo 55 for the IWGP Junior Heavyweight Tag Team Championship at Wrestle Kingdom IV. Averno participated in the inaugural two-night Fantastica Mania 2011 tour on January 22 and 23, 2011. On the first night's six-man tag team main event, he, Shinsuke Nakamura and Tetsuya Naito defeated Devitt, Hiroshi Tanahashi and Místico, whom Averno pinned. After the match, he ripped off Místico's mask. Averno lost to Místico in a two-out-of-three falls match the next night. He again returned in September for another tour of Japan.

=== Lucha Libre AAA Worldwide (2014–2021) ===
==== La Sociedad (2014–2016) ====
Averno made his debut for Lucha Libre AAA Worldwide (AAA) on May 17, 2014, in a main event six-man tag team match as a new member of the rudo stable La Sociedad, teaming with Chessman and Pentagón Jr. to defeat Fénix, whom he pinned, Cibernético and Psycho Clown. After the match, he was attacked by an unnamed "mysterious wrestler" (later known as Myzteziz), portrayed by his old rival Místico. At Verano de Escándalo ("Summer of Scandal") on June 7, Averno, Chessman and Perro Aguayo Jr. lost to Cibernético, La Parka and Myzteziz. At Triplemanía XXII on August 17, Averno placed his hair on the line in a six-man steel cage Lucha de Apuestas, being the second wrestler to escape the cage.

On September 26, Averno, replacing Charly Manson, joined Chessman and Cibernético to reform the Los Hell Brothers stable. They defeated Los Psycho Circus (Monster Clown, Murder Clown and Psycho Clown) at Héroes Inmortales VIII ("Immortal Heroes VIII") on October 12, but Averno and Chessman failed to win their AAA World Trios Championship in a two-on-three handicap match on December 7 at Guerra de Titanes ("War of the Titans"). In February 2015, Los Hell Brothers officially joined La Sociedad. They captured the title on June 14 at Verano de Escándalo, marking Averno's first title in AAA. At Triplemanía XXIII on August 9, Los Hell Brothers successfully defended it against the trios of Fénix, Angélico and Jack Evans and El Hijo del Fantasma, El Texano Jr. and Pentagón Jr. in a steel cage match. Averno participated in the Copa Antonio Peña at Héroes Inmortales IX on October 4, where he and his stablemates eliminated Electroshock, before being the second to last wrestler eliminated by La Parka. At Guerra de Titanes on January 22, 2016, Averno and Chessman defeated Aero Star and Fénix and Máscara Año 2000 Jr. and Villano IV to win the vacant AAA World Tag Team Championship. However, immediately afterwards, La Sociedad turned on the two and expelled them from the group.

Averno participated in the four-way elimination semi-finals of the Rey de Reyes ("King of Kings") tournament on February 19, where he was the first wrestler eliminated by La Parka. At the titular event on March 23, they successfully defended the title in a three-way tables, ladders, and chairs match against Argenis and Australian Suicide and Daga and Joe Líder. When sisters and former rivals Los Apaches (Faby Apache and Mari Apache) reunited and demanded that Los Hell Brothers put the AAA World Tag Team Championship on the line, Averno and Chessman declined, acting very dismissing and sexist. During a television taping on July 8, they mocked Los Apaches by dressing up as a pair of frumpy women. At the subsequent taping, they lost the title to Angélico and Evans due to a distraction from Los Apaches, after which Averno and Chessman finally agreed to face them on August 28 at Triplemanía XXIV. The match ended in a no-contest after they hit Los Apaches with light tubes, causing El Apache to come to their aid.

==== Los OGTs (2016–2021) ====
Averno and Chessman then paired with Ricky Marvin to form Los OGTs, defeating Los Apaches on October 2 at Héroes Inmortales X. On November 4, they defeated Los Xinetez (Dark Cuervo, Dark Scoria and El Zorro) by disqualification to win the AAA World Trios Championship after backfired interference from Faby. At Guerra de Titanes on January 20, 2017, he and Chessman defeated Los Apaches with help from Los Xinetez. On March 5, they lost the title to El, Faby and Mary Apache after Marvin lost to Faby in a singles match. Averno was the last wrestler eliminated by Argenis in that year's Rey de Reyes on March 19. Shortly after, Averno and Chessman kicked Marvin out of Los OGTs after he accidentally cost them a match against Argenis and El Hijo del Fantasma, replacing him with Super Fly. At Triplemanía XXV on August 26, they failed to win the event's annual torneo lumberjack match. At Héroes Inmortales XI on October 1, Averno risked his hair inside the Domo de la Muerte ("Dome of Death"), held under Lucha de Apuestas rules, where he was able to escape and keep it safe.

Los OGTs subsequently entered a feud with Nuevo Poder del Norte (Carta Brava Jr. and Mocho Cota Jr. and Tito Santana), defeating them for the AAA World Trios Championship on November 3. They lost it back to them in a four-way elimination match also involving Aero Star, Drago and Raptor and Angelikal, Bengala and Máscara de Bronce at Guerra de Titanes on January 26, 2018. At Rey de Reyes on March 4, they failed to regain the title in a tables, ladders, and chairs match. The feud between the trios culminated in a Lucha de Apuestas at Verano de Escándalo on June 3, which Los OGTs won, forcing Nuevo Poder del Norte to have all of their hair shaved off. At Triplemanía XXVI on August 25, they defeated Evans, Juventud Guerrera and Teddy Hart in a lumberjack match. At Triplemanía XXVII on August 3, 2019, Averno participated in the Copa Triplemanía, but was eliminated by Puma King. Averno left AAA during the COVID-19 pandemic and returned to the independent circuit in April 2021.

=== Return to CMLL (2021–present) ===
==== Feud with Místico (2021–2023) ====
After a seven year-absence, Averno returned to CMLL on October 6, 2021, where he and Mephisto lost to Místico and Volador Jr. On December 25, he unsuccessfully challenged Místico for the NWA World Historic Middleweight Championship. They were paired for the Torneo Nacional de Parejas Increíbles on February 25, 2022, respectively defeating the teams of Euforia and Último Guerrero and Soberano Jr. and Templario before losing to Atlantis Jr. and Stuka Jr. in the finals. At the CMLL 89th Anniversary Show on September 16, he and Guerrero lost to them in the finals of the Cuadrangular Eliminatorio de Parejas Increíbles ("Incredible Pairs Elimination Quadrangular"), where the winners advanced to the main event in a Lucha de Apuestas, having previously eliminated Atlantis and Fuerza Guerrera. Averno and Místico won the following year's Torneo Nacional de Parejas Increíbles on February 17, 2023, defeating Atlantis and Guerrero, Rocky Romero and Volador Jr. and finally Soberano Jr. and Templario. He competed in the semi-final torneo cibernetico of the La Copa Junior VIP ("The Junior VIP Cup") tournament on May 19, where he was the second wrestler eliminated by Místico.

==== Return to Los Infernales (2023–present) ====
By December, Averno was listed as a member of the revived Los Infernales alongside Euforia and Mephisto, officially returning to the stable. He partnered with Guerrero de la Muerte for the Torneo Gran Alternativa on January 26, 2024, losing to Atlantis Jr. and Futuro in the first round.

At Homenaje a Dos Leyendas on March 29, Averno defeated Bárbaro Cavernario to win the CMLL World Light Heavyweight Championship. He made his first successful title defense against Esfinge on June 10. He was the last wrestler eliminated in a torneo cibernetico in both a number one contendership match for the AEW International Championship on July 23 and in the semi-finals of the Copa Independencia ("Independence Cup") tournament on September 6. At Noche de Campeones ("Night of Champions") on September 27, Los Infernales defeated Máscara Dorada, Neón and Star Jr. to win the CMLL World Trios Championship. On October 25, he defeated Zandokan Jr. to retain his title. He and Draego lost to Legendario and Templario in the first round of that year's Torneo Gran Alternativa on December 20. Averno and Legendario then entered a brief feud that led to a title match on January 28, 2025, where Averno successfully defended the CMLL World Light Heavyweight Championship. Los Infernales lost their title to El Sky Team (Dorada, Místico and Neón) on May 16, and Averno lost his to MJF on August 1. On September 19, at the CMLL 92nd Anniversary Show, Averno and Guerrero were the second team eliminated by Esfinge and Valiente in a three-way elimination tag team match where the winners advanced to a Lucha de Apuestas in the main event.

On February 13, 2026, Averno failed to win Atlantis Jr.'s NWA World Historic Light Heavyweight Championship in a three-way match also involving Soberano Jr. However, Averno defeated Atlantis Jr. to win the title in Japan later that month. At Homenaje a Dos Leyendas on March 20, Averno won a torneo cibernetico for the Copa Infernal ("Infernal Cup"), consisting of Los Infernales members, last eliminating Guerrero. On March 31, he defeated Atlantis Jr. to retain the title. Three days later, he and Flip Gordon lost to Dorada in the three-way semi-finals of the Universal Championship tournament. On May 1, he and Euforia unsuccessfully challenged Bishop Dyer and Donovan Dijak for the MLW World Tag Team Championship. On June 14, Averno and Zandokan Jr. outlasted Dorada, El Cobarde, Valiente Jr. and Volador Jr. to advance to the finals of the "heirs" category of the Copa Dinastías ("Dynasties Cup") tournament, which Zandokan Jr. won the following week. The following month, Averno reignited his long-running rivalry with Místico, sparking the announcement of a mask vs. hair match between the two at the CMLL 93rd Anniversary Show. At the event on September 18, he and Místico won a four-way elimination tag team match to advance to the Lucha de Apuestas in the main event. In the end, Averno lost to Místico and was forced to be shaved bald. At Noche de Campeones on September 25, he defeated Soberano Jr. to retain the NWA World Historic Light Heavyweight Championship.

=== Major League Wrestling (2020, 2024–present) ===
Averno, representing AAA, made his debut for Major League Wrestling (MLW) on the April 18, 2020 episode of Fusion in Tijuana, defeating Douglas James. He returned at SuperFight on February 3, 2024, losing to Místico. On November 9, at Lucha Apocalypto, he unsuccessfully challenged Místico for the MLW World Middleweight Championship in a three-way match also involving Titán. At Kings of Colosseum on January 11, 2025, he defeated Dorada and Esfinge in a three-way match. On the August 22, 2026 episode of Fusion, Averno failed to win the MLW National Openweight Championship from Austin Aries in a three-way match also involving Místico.

=== Return to NJPW (2025–present) ===
Averno returned to NJPW in February 2025 as part of the Fantastica Mania 2025 tour. During the final night on February 28, he unsuccessfully challenged for Místico's MLW World Middleweight Championship. On February 27, 2026, during the final night of the Fantastica Mania 2026 tour, Averno defeated Atlantis Jr. to win the NWA World Historic Light Heavyweight Championship.

== Championships and accomplishments ==
- Consejo Mundial de Lucha Libre
  - CMLL World Light Heavyweight Championship (1 time)
  - CMLL World Middleweight Championship (1 time)
  - CMLL World Tag Team Championship (3 times) – with Mephisto
  - CMLL World Trios Championship (2 times) – with Ephesto and Mephisto (1), with Euforia and Mephisto (1)
  - Mexican National Trios Championship (1 time) – with El Satánico and Mephisto
  - Mexican National Welterweight Championship (1 time)
  - NWA World Middleweight Championship (1 time) (Note: CMLL has not been a member of the National Wrestling Alliance since the late 1980s but continued to promote several NWA "Branded" titles beyond that time.)
  - NWA World Historic Middleweight Championship (1 time, inaugural)
  - NWA World Historic Light Heavyweight Championship (1 time, current)
  - Torneo Nacional de Parejas Increíbles (2023) – with Místico
  - Copa Bobby Bonales 2024
  - Copa Infernal (2026)
- Lucha Libre AAA Worldwide
  - AAA World Tag Team Championship (1 time) – with Chessman
  - AAA World Trios Championship (3 times) – with Cibernético and Chessman (1), Chessman and Ricky Marvin (1), and Chessman and Super Fly (1)
- Pro Wrestling Illustrated
  - PWI ranked him 48 of the 500 best singles wrestlers of the PWI 500 in 2006
- Total Nonstop Action Wrestling
  - TNA World X Cup (2008) – with Rey Bucanero, Último Guerrero and Volador Jr.

== Luchas de Apuestas record ==
Winner (wager)	Loser (wager)	Location	Event	Date	Notes
Rencor Latino (mask)	Apolo Chino (mask)	Mexico City	Live event	June 9, 1998	
Rencor Latino (mask)	El Hijo del Gladiador (mask)	Mexico City	Entre Torre Infernal	August 4, 2002	(Note: This was the finals of a 12-man Torneo Cibernetico elimination match.)
Averno (mask)	Plata (mask)	Lagos de Moreno, Jalisco	Live event	August 9, 2009	
La Máscara (mask)	Averno (mask)	Mexico City	Juicio Final	June 17, 2011	
Averno (hair)	Blue Panther (hair)	Mexico City	CMLL 80th Anniversary Show	September 13, 2013	
Los OGTs (hair) (Averno, Chessman and Super Fly)	El Nuevo Poder del Norte (hair) (Carta Brava Jr., Mocho Cota Jr. and Tito Santana)	Monterrey, Nuevo León	Verano de Escándalo	June 3, 2018	
Místico (mask)	Averno (hair)	Mexico City	CMLL 93rd Anniversary Show	September 18, 2026	
