= Texano Jr. =

Mexican professional wrestler (born 1984)

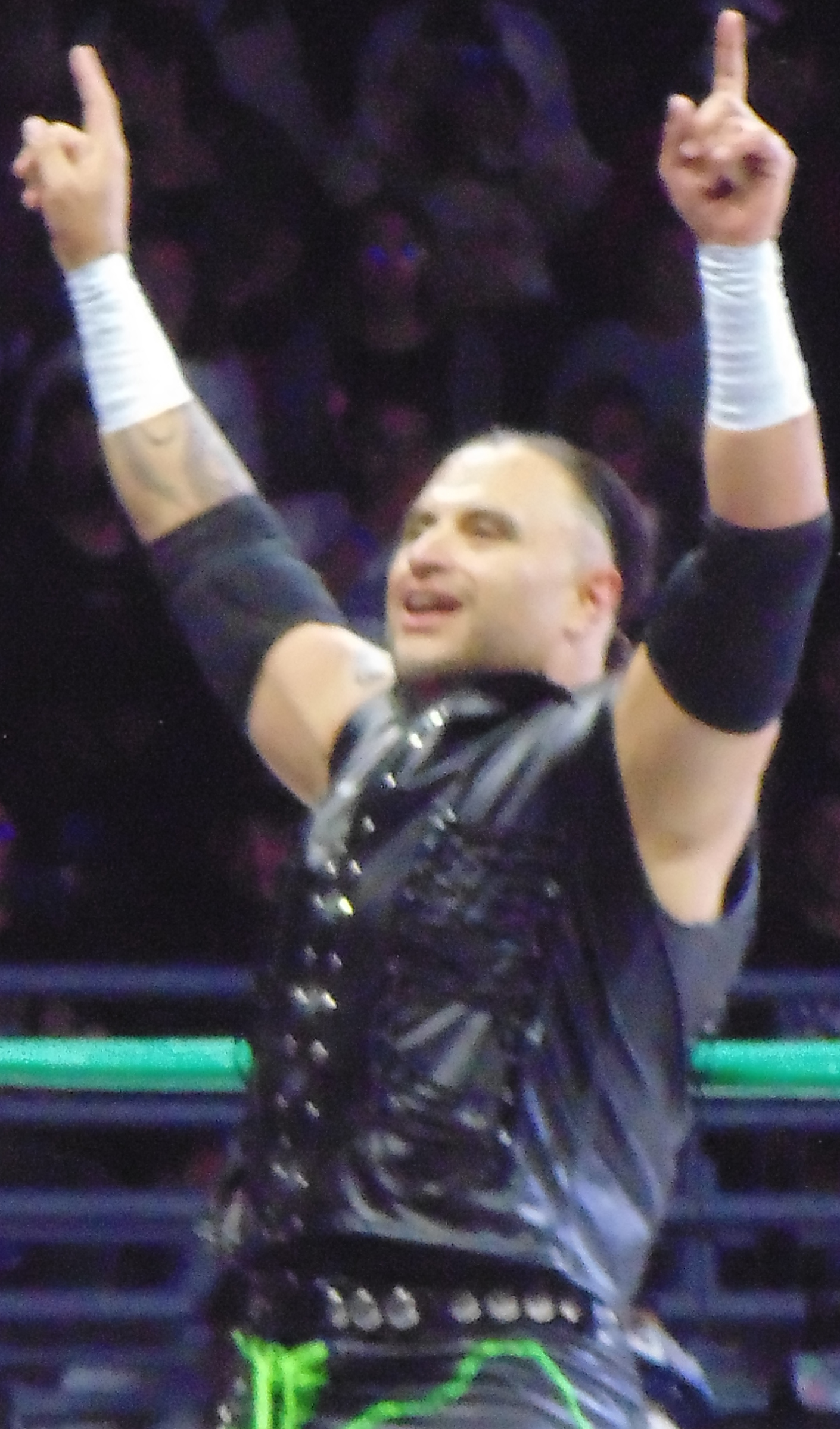
- Texano Jr. in 2026

Personal information
- Born: Juan Anguilar Leos; July 31, 1984 (age 42) Mexicali, Baja California, Mexico

Professional wrestling career
- Ring name(s): Kempo Kid; El Texano Jr. Texano; Texano Jr. El Texano Jr.
- Billed height: 1.85 m (6 ft 1 in)
- Billed weight: 100 kg (220 lb)
- Billed from: Mexico City, Mexico; Mexicali, Baja California, Mexico
- Trained by: El Texano; El Satánico; Shocker
- Debut: February 1999

Juan Aguilar Leos (born July 31, 1984) is a Mexican professional wrestler, who wrestled under the ring name El Texano Jr.

Aguilar is the son of Juan Conrado Aguilar Jáuregui, who wrestled under the name El Texano; Aguilar's brother is a wrestler known as Súper Nova / Bengala and he has several uncles and cousins that are professional wrestlers including El Dandy, Mictlán, Pólvora and Inquisidor.

For the early part of his career Aguilar worked for the Mexican promotion Consejo Mundial de Lucha Libre (CMLL), during which he also made several tours of Japan for New Japan Pro-Wrestling (NJPW) from 2005 until 2007. While in CMLL, he was a member of groups Los Hijos del Averno (Spanish for "the Sons of Hell") and Los Perros del Mal ("the Evil Dogs"), but he opted to remain with CMLL when Los Perros left the promotion in 2010. In November 2011, Aguilar left CMLL to join Perros del Mal Producciones.

After signing with AAA under his current ring name, Texano became a two-time AAA Mega Champion, with his 735-day reign being the longest in history until Kenny Omega surpassed it in 2021. Texano has also gone on to become a two-time AAA World Trios Championship and a one-time AAA World Tag Team Championship (with Rey Escorpión). Texano also became the Rey de Reyes 2015 winner.

== Professional wrestling career ==
=== Independent circuit (1999–2003) ===
Aguilar was trained by his father prior to his professional wrestling debut. In 1999 he began working as the masked wrestler character "Kempo Kid", hiding his family relationship from the public. Between 1999 and 2002 or 2003 the Kempo Kid would win several Lucha de Apuestas, or "bet matches" where he forced his opponents to unmask as a result. His mask victories included Extasis, Avispón Jr., and Apolo Negro. In late 2002, or early 2003 Kempo Kid lost a Lucha de Apuestas match to Stuka Jr. and was forced to unmask. As part of the tradition wrestlers are supposed to announce their real name, which means that Aguilar revealed that he was the son of El Texano. He subsequently took the ring name "El Texano Jr.", adopting the same cowboy style character that his father used including carrying a Lariat with him to the ring.

=== Consejo Mundial de Lucha Libre (2003–2011) ===
Not long after adopting the new ring name he began working for Consejo Mundial de Lucha Libre (CMLL; "World Wrestling Council"), the world's oldest and Mexico's largest wrestling promotion. On October 7, 2005 Texano Jr. won his first professional wrestling championship when he teamed up with El Sagrado and Máximo to defeat Pandilla Guerrera ("Gang of Warriors"; Sangre Azteca, Doctor X and Nitro) to win the Mexican National Trios Championship. Over the next 569 days Texano Jr., Sagrado and Máximo defended the trios championship against teams such as Danger, Infierno, Magnum; deposed champions Doctor X, Nitro, Sangre Azteca and the team of Arkangel, Doctor X and Misterioso II. On April 29, 2007 the team lost the Mexican National Trios Title to the Los Perros del Mal ("The Bad Dogs") faction of Mr. Águila, Damián 666 and Halloween. The title change came about as El Texano Jr. turned on his partners mid-match, giving Los Perros del Mal an easy victory. Not long after turning Rudo (the Lucha Libre term for heel, or villain) Texano Jr. joined Los Perros del Mal and began teaming with El Terrible on a regular basis. On June 13, 2008 Texano Jr. participated in the main event of CMLL's annual Infierno en el Ring show, a multi-man steel cage match where the last man in the ring would have his hair shaved off. The match involved Los Perros del Mal, represented by Texano Jr. Damián 666, Mr. Águila, El Terrible and Perro Aguayo Jr. while the tecnico (Face or good guys in wrestling) side was represented by Alex Koslov, Marco Corleone, Shocker, Negro Casas and Heavy Metal. The match ended up with Texano Jr. and Heavy Metal being the last two in the ring, with Texano pinning Heavy Metal to force Heavy Metal to be shaved bald after the match. On August 26, 2008 Texano Jr. and El Terrible defeated Sagrado and Rayman to win the Occidente Tag Team Championship, a regional tag team title defended mainly in the Mexican stated of Guadalajara.

In late 2008 Perros del Mal leader Perro Aguayo Jr. decided to leave CMLL taking with him most of the Perros del Mal group, but El Texano Jr. and El Terrible decided not to leave CMLL. When Averno and Mephisto formed the group Los Hijos del Averno (The Sons of Hell) both Texano Jr. and El Terrible joined the group. On March 8, 2009 Texano Jr. won his second big "Luchas de Apuestas" match, defeating former teammate Máximo, forcing him to have his head shaved. Texano Jr. continued to be successful as he won his first singles championship, the NWA World Light Heavyweight Championship from Atlantis on April 5, 2009. Holding the NWA Light Heavyweight Championship qualified Texano Jr. for the "CMLL Universal Championship" tournament, a single elimination tournament for all male CMLL endorsed champions. El Texano Jr. won block A on June 5 defeating El Hijo del Fantasma (CMLL World Trios Champion), Black Warrior (Mexican National Trios Champion) and La Sombra (CMLL World Tag Team Champion) to qualify for the final. Texano Jr. was defeated by Último Guerrero in the finals of the tournament on June 19, 2009. On July 24, 2009 El Texano Jr. made his first successful NWA World Light Heavyweight Title defense, defeating former champion Shocker. In the fall of 2009 Texano Jr. and El Terrible became involved in a long-running "Mexico vs. Japan" storyline that had been going on since the summer as they began working with the Japanese duo No Limit (Yujiro and Naito).

On December 4, 2009 Terrible and Texano Jr. defeated No Limit in a Luchas de Apuesta hair vs. hair match that was the main event of CMLL's Sin Salida show. After the match both members of No Limit had their heads shaved completely bald per lucha libre traditions. On February 14, 2010 Texano Jr. and Terrible travelled to Japan to challenge No Limit for the IWGP Tag Team Championship, but were not able to defeat No Limit in their home country. By virtue of holding the NWA World Light Heavyweight Championship El Texano Jr. participated in the 2010 Universal Championship tournament. He was part of "Block A" that competed on the July 30, 2010 Super Viernes show. He co-won the eight-man seeding battle royal, and then won his first round match by defeating Ephesto. The second round was a rematch from the previous year's tournament, only this time La Sombra eliminated El Texano Jr. and not vice versa. On August 12, 2010, El Texano Jr.'s NWA World Light Heavyweight Championship was replaced with the new NWA World Historic Light Heavyweight Championship after CMLL had received complaints from the National Wrestling Alliance. In October and November 2010, El Texano Jr. and El Terrible took part in New Japan's 2010 G1 Tag League. After victories over Takashi Iizuka and Toru Yano and No Limit, Texano Jr. and Terrible finished fifth in their block and didn't advance to the semifinals of the tournament. On December 14, 2010, El Texano Jr. lost the NWA World Historic Light Heavyweight Championship to Shocker. Texano Jr. and El Terrible defeated the father/son team of Brazo de Plata and Máximo in the main event of the 2011 Homenaje a Dos Leyendas ("Homage to Two Legends") show, forcing La Dinastia Alvarado (Brazo de Plata and Máximo) both to have their heads shaved bald. In April 2011, Texano Jr. and El Terrible left Los Hijos del Averno to form a new group with Rey Bucanero. The following month, the group was named La Fuerza TRT.

=== Perros del Mal (2011) ===
On November 22, 2011, it was reported that El Texano Jr. had left CMLL and joined Perros del Mal Producciones. On November 24, El Texano Jr. appeared at a press conference, where he was officially presented as the newest member of the promotion, appearing alongside his brother Super Nova, who also works for the promotion.

=== Lucha Libre AAA Worldwide (2011–2021) ===
On December 8, El Texano Jr. and Toscano appeared at another press conference, where it was announced that they were joining CMLL's rival promotion Lucha Libre AAA Worldwide (AAA). Later that day at an International Wrestling Revolution Group (IWRG) event, both El Texano Jr. and Súper Nova joined the Perros del Mal stable. El Texano Jr. made his AAA debut on December 16 at Guerra de Titanes, forming the stable El Consejo ("The Council") with former CMLL workers Toscano and Máscara Año 2000 Jr. On January 21, 2012, Mortiz and Semental joined El Consejo as well, establishing it as a group opposing both AAA's tecnicos and rudos alike. On February 10, El Consejo was joined by Argos. El Consejo's first big match in AAA took place on March 18 at Rey de Reyes, where El Texano Jr., Máscara Año 2000 Jr. and Toscano defeated AAA representatives Dr. Wagner Jr., Electroshock and Heavy Metal, following interference from the stable's newest member, "El Hombre de Negro" ("The Man in Black"). On May 19, El Texano Jr., Máscara Año 2000 Jr. and Toscano defeated Los Psycho Circus (Monster Clown, Murder Clown and Psycho Clown), following another interference from El Hombre de Negro, to win the AAA World Trios Championship. On June 16, El Hombre de Negro unmasked and revealed that it was Máscara Año 2000 under the mask. On October 7 at Héroes Inmortales, El Texano Jr. won the sixth annual Copa Antonio Peña tournament, scoring the last elimination over AAA Mega Champion El Mesías. However, afterwards the cup was taken away from El Texano Jr. when referee Copetes Salazar found out that Texano Jr. had cheated to win the match. With a shot at the AAA Mega Championship in his future, El Texano Jr. formed an alliance with Dorian Roldán, bringing El Consejo under the umbrella of his La Sociedad stable.

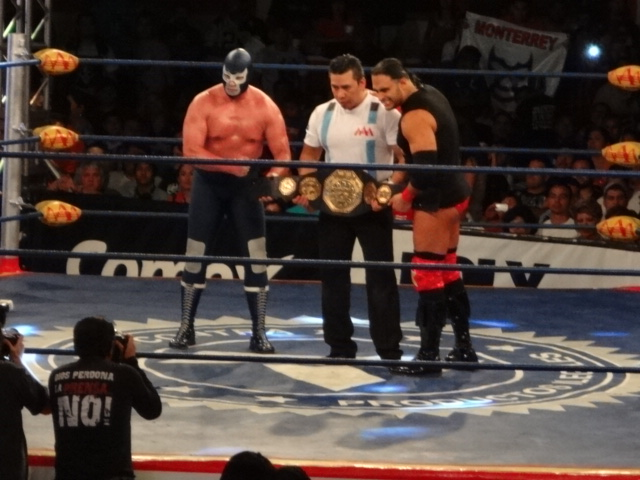
El Texano Jr. and Blue Demon Jr. at start of their match at the 2013 Rey de Reyes.

On December 2 at Guerra de Titanes, El Texano Jr. defeated El Mesías to become the youngest AAA Mega Champion in history. On February 18, 2013, El Consejo lost the AAA World Trios Championship to Los Psycho Circus, when Toscano turned on El Texano Jr. during the match. On March 17 at that year's Rey de Reyes ("King of Kings") show, El Texano Jr. successfully defended the AAA Mega Championship against Blue Demon Jr. On June 16 at Triplemanía XXI, El Texano Jr. successfully defended his title against Heavy Metal. On September 3, El Texano Jr. became the longest reigning AAA Mega Champion in its history as he eclipsed Jeff Jarrett's title reign of 274 days. On June 7, 2014, at Verano de Escándalo ("Summer of Scandal"), El Texano Jr. successfully defended the title against Psycho Clown, after former CMLL referee Rafael el Maya turned rudo and joined El Consejo. The rivalry between El Texano Jr. and Psycho Clown culminated on August 17 at Triplemanía XXII, where Psycho Clown was victorious in a Lucha de Apuestas between the two, forcing Texano Jr. to have his head shaved. After a two-year reign, El Texano Jr. lost the AAA Mega Championship to El Patrón Alberto on December 7, 2014, at Guerra de Titanes, ending his record 735-day reign. On March 18, 2015, El Texano Jr. won the 2015 Rey de Reyes tournament. On March 23, 2016, El Texano Jr. defeated El Mesías to win the vacant AAA Mega Championship for the second time. He lost the title to Johnny Mundo on March 19, 2017. On March 4, 2018, at Rey de Reyes lost against El Hijo del Fantasma in a Mask vs Hair match. On July 13, 2021, Texano Jr. was announcing Alberto El Patron's "Hecho en Mexico" event, announcing his departure from AAA after 9 years in his career.

=== Lucha Underground (2015–2017) ===
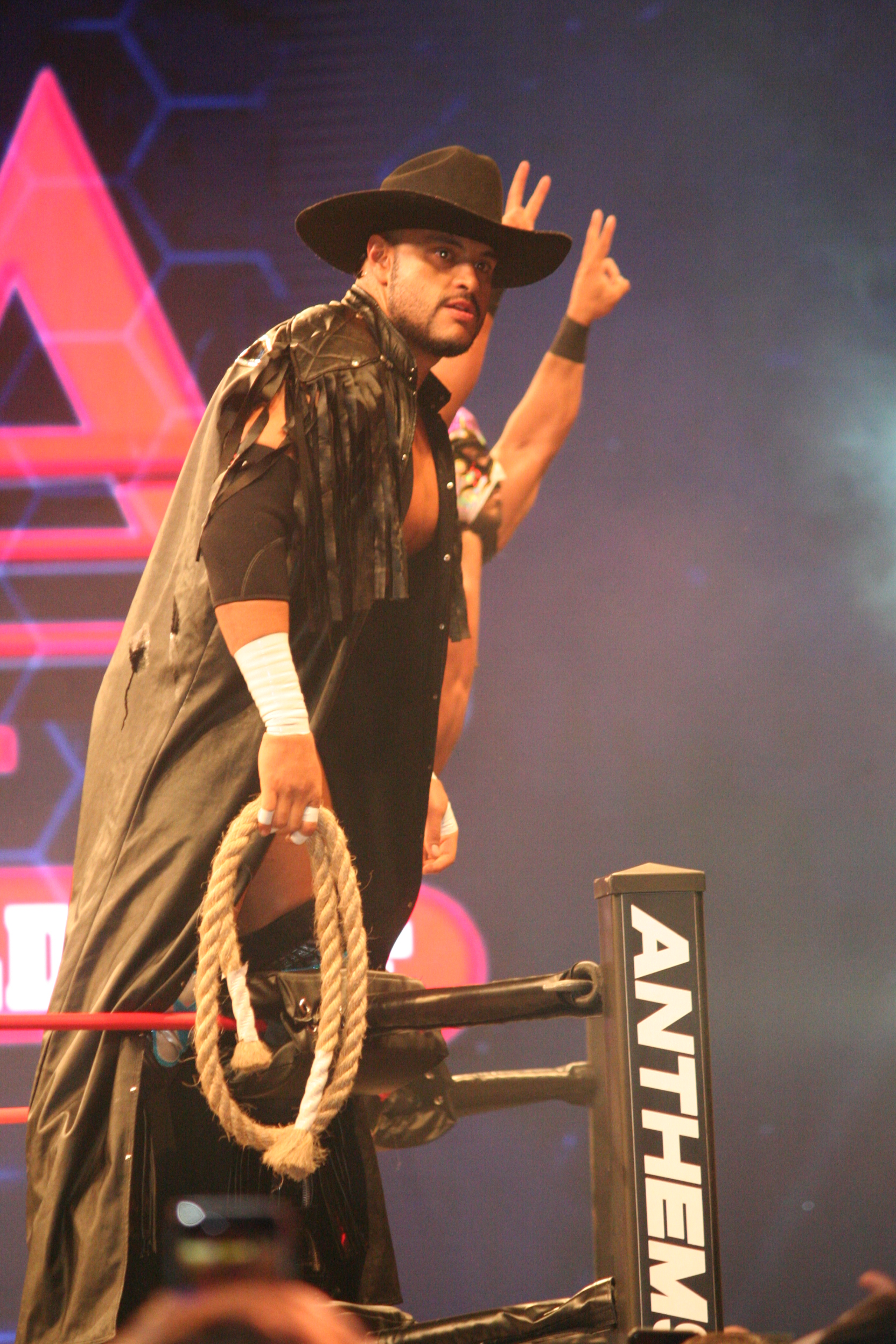
Texano at Bound for Glory in November 2017

Texano made his Lucha Underground debut at the January 17, 2015, taping, when he attacked Alberto el Patrón, who was also making his debut at that taping. In Lucha Underground Aguila performed the name "Texano", without the "Junior" suffix. On the March 25 episode Texano unsuccessfully challenged el Patrón for the AAA Mega Championship in a Bullrope match. He would later turn face when LU needed to replace an injured Chavo Guerrero Jr. in a storyline with Blue Demon Jr. The two wrestled in a No Disqualification match at Ultima Lucha where Blue Demon Jr. won the match to cap off the first season. During season two Texano won one of the Aztec Medallions that allowed Texano to fight for the Lucha Underground Gift of the Gods Championship, a match he would lose to Chavo Guerrero Jr. For Ultima Lucha Dos he participated in a "Unique Opportunity" tournament, but lost to Son of Havoc in the first round.

He wouldn't appear in Season Four. Famous B explained he sent Texano to Mexico to win titles to justify his absence.

=== Impact Wrestling (2017–2018) ===
Texano made his Impact Wrestling debut, helping El Hijo del Fantasma and Pagano defeat Eddie Edwards and Ethan Carter III, after the match the three deliver a post match beat-down with Texano using a rope to whip before James Storm made the save. at Bound for Glory, Team AAA (Texano, El Hijo del Fantasma and Pagano) lost to Team Impact (Ethan Carter III, Eddie Edwards and James Storm) in a Six-man tag team match. On September 20, 2018 episode of Impact!, Texano unsuccessfully challenged Austin Aries for the Impact World Championship.

=== WWE and return to Lucha Libre AAA Worldwide (2026–present) ===
On the April 24, 2026, episode of Lucha Libre AAA, Texano Jr. wrestled in his first match in Lucha Libre AAA Worldwide (AAA), now under WWE ownership, after five years away from the promotion, teaming up with El Grande Americano to earn a victory against El Mesias and Mecha Wolf.

== Personal life ==
Juan Aguilar Leos was born on July 31, 1984, in Mexicali, Baja California, Mexico; son of Juan Conrado Aguilar Jáuregui, a luchador or professional wrestler known under the ring name El Texano. Two years later his parents had another son who would later be known under the ring name Súper Nova and in 2016 as Bengala. (Note: Lucha Libre has a tradition of not revealing the birth name of masked wrestlers who have never been unmasked, newspapers rarely report these names and they usually not confirmed unless a wrestler is forced to unmask. Súper Nova has never been unmasked so his birth name is not a matter of public record.) Juan Aguilar grew up in a family of luchadors as several uncles were in the business as well including El Dandy, Negro Navarro, Apolo Navarro and Drako. Over time several of his cousins also became professional wrestlers such as Mictlán, Trauma I, Trauma II, Pólvora and Inquisidor.

=== Lawsuit against Lucha Underground ===
On February 13, 2019 it was reported that Aguilar had filed a lawsuit in California against the El Rey Network and the Baba-G production company behind Lucha Underground. The lawsuit claimed that the LU contract "Illegally restricted" wrestlers from working in their "lawful profession" by being restricted from working for other companies while under contract with LU, which only paid per match. Also, Aguilar didn't work in the 4th season, claiming he wasn't paid since 2016. The lawsuit was similar to the lawsuit made by King Cuerno, Ivelisse Vélez, Joey Ryan and Melissa Cervantes two weeks before looking to invalidate their contracts.

== Championships and accomplishments ==
- Lucha Libre AAA Worldwide
  - AAA Mega Championship (2 times)
  - AAA World Tag Team Championship (1 time) – with Rey Escorpión
  - AAA World Trios Championship (2 times) – with Máscara Año 2000 Jr. & Toscano (1) and La Hiedra, Rey Escorpion and Taurus
  - Copa Antonio Peña (2012)
  - Guitarra de Oro (2017)
  - Rey de Reyes (2015)
- Consejo Mundial de Lucha Libre
  - Mexican National Trios Championship (1 time) – with El Sagrado and Máximo (Note: the Mexican National Championships are sanctioned by the Mexico City Boxing and Wrestling Commission, but promoted by individual promotions, CMLL holds the exclusive rights to the National Trios Championship.)
  - NWA World Light Heavyweight Championship (1 time) (Note: Up until the late 1980s CMLL was a member of the National Wrestling Alliance and retained the NWA Light Heavyweight Championship title after leaving the NWA. It is not officially recognized as an NWA Championship.)
  - NWA World Historic Light Heavyweight Championship (1 time)
  - Mexican G1 Junior Climax (2005)
- CMLL Guadalajara
  - Occidente Tag Team Championship (1 time) – with El Terrible
- DDT Pro-Wrestling
  - Ironman Heavymetalweight Championship (1 time)
- Invasión Indy
  - NWA Mexico Tag Team Championship (1 time, current) - with Super Nova
- Pro Wrestling Illustrated
  - PWI ranked him #48 of the top 500 singles wrestlers in the PWI 500 in 2013

== Luchas de Apuestas record ==
Winner (wager)	Loser (wager)	Location	Event	Date	Notes
Kempo Kid (mask)	Extasis (mask)	Morelia, Michoacán	Live event	N/A	
Kempo Kid (mask)	Avispón Jr. (mask)	Acapulco, Guerrero	Live event	N/A	
Kempo Kid (mask)	Apolo Negro (mask)	Oaxaca, Oaxaca	Live event	N/A	
Kempo Kid (mask)	Kid Arroyo (hair)	Michoacán, Michoacán	Live event	N/A	
Stuka Jr. (mask)	Kempo Kid (mask)	Monterrey, Nuevo León	Live event	2002/2003	
El Texano Jr. (hair)	Rambo (hair)	Mexico City	Live event	N/A	
El Texano Jr. (hair)	Maniacop (hair)	Puebla, Puebla	Live event	February 5, 2006	
El Texano Jr. (hair)	Heavy Metal	Mexico City	Infierno en el Ring	June 13, 2008	(Note: The match also included Alex Koslov, Damián 666, Marco Corleone, Shocker, Mr. Águila, Negro Casas, El Terrible and Perro Aguayo Jr.)
El Texano Jr. (hair)	Máximo (hair)	Guadalajara, Jalisco	CMLL Live event	March 8, 2009	
El Texano Jr. and El Terrible (hair)	No Limit (hair) (Naito and Yujiro)	Mexico City	Sin Salida	December 4, 2009	
La Fuerza TRT (hair) (El Texano Jr. and El Terrible)	La Dinastia Alvarado (hair) (Brazo de Plata and Máximo)	Mexico City	Homenaje a Dos Leyendas	March 18, 2011	
Psycho Clown (hair)	El Texano Jr. (hair)	Mexico City	Triplemanía XXII	August 17, 2014	
El Hijo del Fantasma (mask)	El Texano Jr. (hair)	Mexico City	Rey de Reyes	March 4, 2018	
