= CMLL Super Viernes (June 2010) =

Mexican Professional wrestling show summary

In June 2010, the Mexico professional wrestling promotion Consejo Mundial de Lucha Libre (CMLL) held four CMLL Super Viernes shows, all of which took place in Arena México on Friday nights. CMLL did not hold any special events on Fridays that would force a cancellation such as a pay-per-view (PPV). Some of the matches from Super Viernes are taped for CMLL's weekly shows that air in Mexico the week following the Super Viernes show. Super Viernes often features storyline feud between two wrestlers or group of wrestlers that develop from week to week, often coming to a conclusion at a major CMLL event or in a match on Friday nights between the individuals.

== June 4, 2010 ==
CMLL Super Viernes
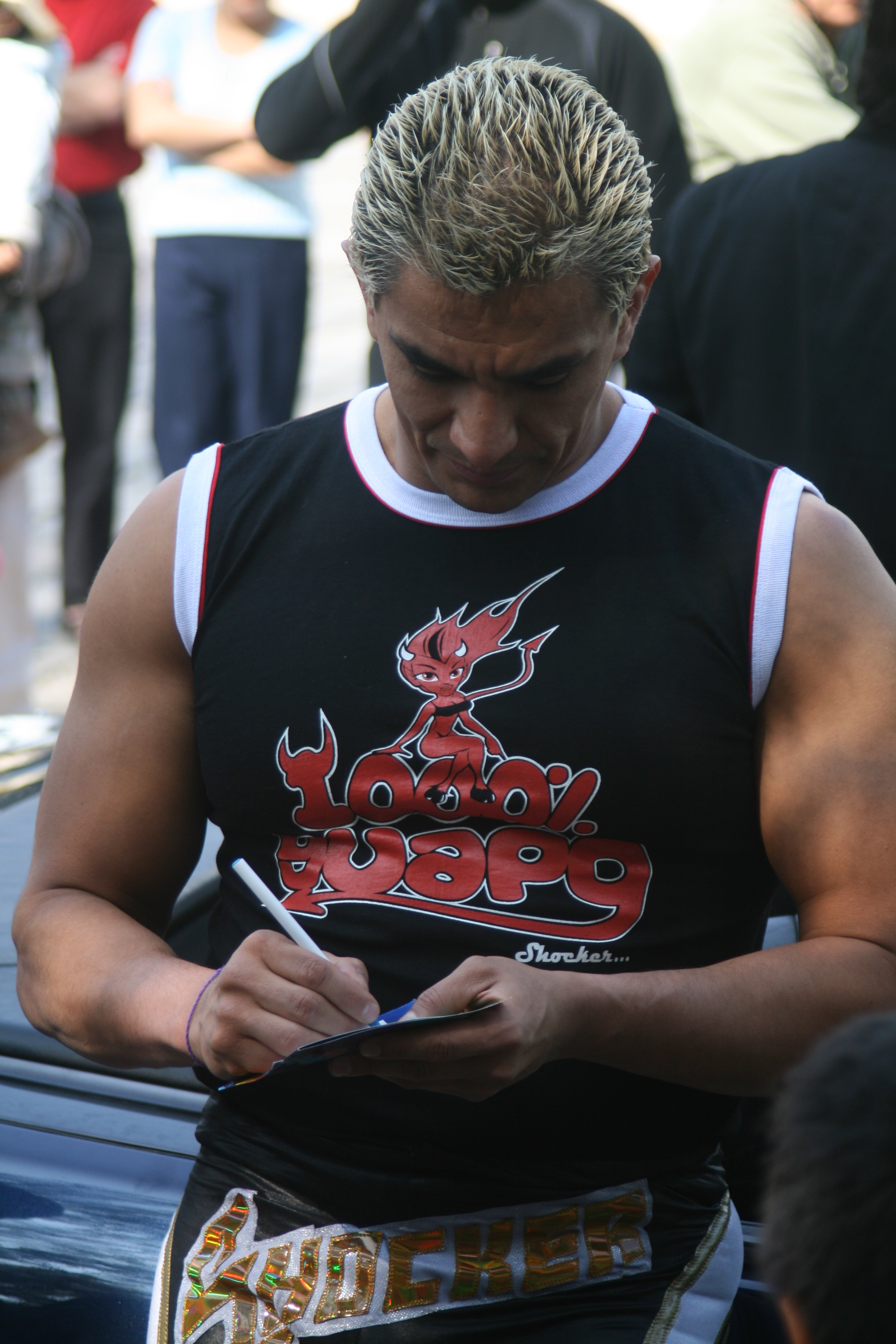
- Shocker part of Los Guapos International
- Promotion: Consejo Mundial de Lucha Libre (CMLL)
- Date: June 4, 2010
- City: Mexico City, Mexico
- Venue: Arena México

CMLL Super Viernes chronology
| ← Previous; Super Viernes May 28, 2010 | Next → Super Viernes June 11, 2010 |

The June 4, 2010 Super Viernes featured six matches in total, including a Mini-Estrella match. The main event saw Guapos International (Shocker and Jon Strongman) and Toscano facing off against Los Guerros de la Atlantida (Atlantis and Último Guerrero) and Gigante Bernard. At the May 28, 2010 Super Viernes Giant Bernarde teamed with Guapos International without any problems, but switched to the opposite side for the June 4 show. The confrontation between Bernard and Strongman is one of the main storylines of the semi-main event of the June 6, 2010 Sin Salida event. Giant Bernard handled the much smaller Shocker and Toscano with ease during the first fall, using his power advantage to toss the two men around the ring. When strongman was tagged in Giant Bernard initially let Último Guerrero and Atlantis take over as he tagged out. The first fall came to an end when Atlantis forced Shocker to submit and Guerrero forced Toscano to submit both by applying Atlantis' trademark La Atlantida Spinning backbreaker rack. In the second fall Strongman and Giant Bernard finally faced off with Strongman tackling Giant Bernard to the ground. Bernard gained the upper hand by slamming the 309 lb (140 kg) heavy Strongman, followed by a Slingshot Plancha from the apron into the ring to pin Strongman, winning the match for his team in two straight falls.

Earlier in the night Latin Lover was introduced to the crowd and it was announced that he was one of the judges of this year’s Il Campeonato Mundial de Baile (A version of Dancing with the Stars) and sat in the audience as a spectator for several of the matches. The semi-final match saw the team of Héctor Garza, El Terrible and El Texano, Jr., who had formed a temporary alliance in recent months, take on the team of La Máscara, Máximo, Volador Jr. Garza took the first fall for his team when he pinned Volador Jr. following a Moonsault. In the second fall La Máscara pinned Garza after 3 minutes and 30 seconds of wrestling. In the third fall El Terrible pinned La Máscara after executing a Plancha, ending the match after 13:15. Following the match Garza went to greet Latin Lover, whom he had worked with before, but when Garza goes to hug Latin Lover he double crosses him and attacks him instead, knocking Latin Lover into the second row. Latin Lover fought back but was attacked by both Garza, Terrible and Texano, Jr. in an out of control fight that had to be broken up by security and a representative of the Mexico City wrestling and boxing commission.

The show also feature the Mexico National Trios Champions MSM Fly (Máscara Dorada, Metro, Stuka, Jr.) teaming together for only the second time since winning the championship, facing off against Poder Mexica (Dragón Rojo, Jr., Misterioso, Jr. and Sangre Azteca) in a non-title match. Poder Mexica previously held the Mexico Trios title but were stripped of the titles and thus never lost them in the ring. The match ended with Dragón Rojo, Jr. fouled Máscara Dorada, causing his team to be disqualified. After the match Poder Mexica kept attacking their opponents until CMLL staff separated the two teams as Sangre Azteca made a challenge for a title match.

The Lighting features the Mexico National Welterweight Champion El Valiente facing off against the leader of Los Cancerberos del Infierno Virus. Valiente and Virus wrestled what was described as a "good match", with both mat work and Valiente showing some of his high flying moves but in the end Virus managed to apply the tapatía Surfboard hold, forcing Valiente to submit 7:29 into the match. The victory may earn Virus a match for the Mexican National Welterweight Championship. The second match of the night featured a Best two out of three falls Six-Mini-Estrellas tag team match with Astral, Mascarita Dorada and Último Dragoncito vs Pequeño Nitro, Pequeño Violencia and Pequeño Black Warrior. Mascarita Dorada was scheduled to appear on the Super 14, 2010 Super Viernes but was replaced by Shockercito at the time. This time Mascarita Dorada did show up, splitting the first two falls between the two Trios. In the third fall Pequeño Black Warrior intentionally pulled Mascarita Dorada's mask off and then pinned him as Dorada was trying to cover up his face. In the opening match Astro Boy and Sensei defeated Mortiz and Semetal in just under 10 minutes.

| No. | Results | Stipulations | Times |
|---|---|---|---|
| 1 | Astro Boy and Sensei defeated Mortiz and Semetal | Best two out of three falls Tag team match | 09:26 |
| 2 | Pequeño Nitro, Pequeño Violencia and Pequeño Black Warrior defeated Astral, Mascarita Dorada and Último Dragoncito | Six-man tag team match | 11:55 |
| 3 | Virus defeated Valiente | Lightning match (One fall, 10 minute time-limit match) | 07:29 |
| 4 | MSM Fly (Máscara Dorada, Metro, Stuka Jr.) defeated Poder Mexica (Dragón Rojo Jr., Misterioso Jr. and Sangre Azteca) by disqualification | Six-man tag team match | 12:31 |
| 5 | Héctor Garza, El Terrible and El Texano Jr. defeated La Máscara, Máximo, Volador Jr. | Six-man tag team match | 13:15 |
| 6 | Los Guerros de la Atlantida (Atlantis and Último Guerrero) and Gigante Bernard defeated Guapos International (Shocker and Jon Strongman) and Toscano | Six-man tag team match | 08:38 |

== June 11, 2010 ==
CMLL Super Viernes
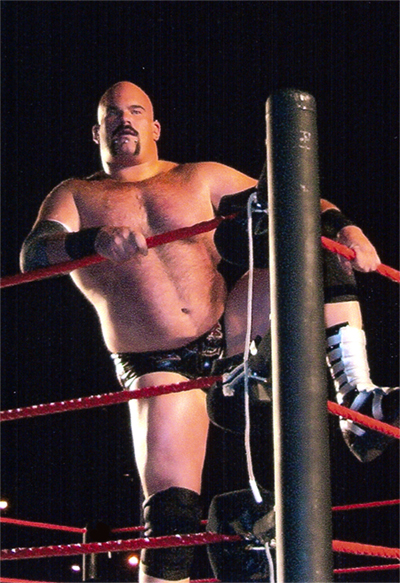
- Gigante Bernard who made his last Super Viernes appearance
- Promotion: Consejo Mundial de Lucha Libre (CMLL)
- Date: June 11, 2010
- City: Mexico City, Mexico
- Venue: Arena México

CMLL Super Viernes chronology
| ← Previous; Super Viernes June 4, 2010 | Next → Super Viernes June 18, 2010 |

The June 11, 2010 Super Viernes feature the traditional six matches that CMLL normally presents, only in this instance CMLL did not feature any women or Mini-Estrella matches, which it usually features at least one of. In addition there was no Lighting Match, but instead there was a singles match rematch from the previous week's Lightning match as Valiente defended the Mexican National Welterweight Championship against Virus.

Attendance for the June 11 Super Viernes was noticeably lower than the weeks leading up to the event, mostly due to the opening night of the 2010 FIFA World Cup and heavy rainfall in and around Mexico City. The main event was billed as a relevos incredibles match, teaming up the tecnicos (good guys) El Hijo del Fantasma and Místico teaming up with the rudo (bad guy) Negro Casas to wrestle the rudos Héctor Garza and Olímpico as well as Volador Jr. who had seemingly turned rudo during the 2010 Sin Salida show the previous Sunday. Mistico came to the ring wearing the Jersey of the Mexico National football team, instantly getting a favorable reaction from the crowd. Volador Jr. came to the ring wearing the rudo mask that combined Volador Jr.'s regular mask with the mask of Averno like the one he had worn during Sin Salida. While his alignment was up in the air after Sin Salida Volador Jr. worked as a fully fledged rudo during the match, something which saw Volador Jr. gain the support of a large portion of the crowd as he targeted Místico during the match. Olímpico won the first fall in the match that marked his return to Arena México. Héctor Garza pinned Hijo del Fantasma after a Moonsault, earning the first fall for their team in just 3:36. The second fall came just 2:42 later as Negro Casas rolled up Olímpico and Hijo del Fantasma pinned Garza. The third fall went longer than the first two falls combined with no clear advantage between the two teams. During the fall Garza dove out of the ring, hitting Hijo del Fantasma with such force that he was removed from the arena on a stretcher, leaving the match a two on three handicap match. The end of the match saw Volador Jr. remove his mask, tossing it to Místico to give the impression that Místico had unmasked him. The rudo ploy worked as the referee disqualified Místico's team giving Volador Jr., Garza and Olímpico the victory in the main event. Following the match Volador Jr. and Místico exchanged challenges for a Lucha de Apuesta, mask vs. mask match, which was also accepted although no official match was booked at the time.

The main story of the semi-main event match was the domination displayed by New Japan Pro-Wrestling's (NJPW) Giant Bernard during the previous two weeks of touring with CMLL as he had not lost even a single fall up to that point. Giant Bernard teamed up with Los Guerreros de la Atlantida (Atlantis and Último Guerrero) to take on Rayo de Jalisco, Jr., who was wrestling his first Arena México match since 2007. Rayo teamed with Shocker and Brazo de Plata. The first fall saw Brazo de Plata pin Último Guerrero after a Senton splash followed by Shocker pinning Atlantis to gain the first fall. The second fall saw Atlantis foul Rayo de Jalisco, Jr. by using a low blow, which caused his team to be disqualified, losing two falls to none in 12 minutes, 42 seconds. While Giant Bernard was not pinned this was the first time during his Mexico tour that he was on the losing side of the match.

On June 4, 2010 Virus defeated Mexican National Welterweight Champion Valiente in a lightning match to earn a match for the championship at the June 11 Super Viernes. The first fall featured both wrestlers exchanging a series of mat wrestling moves, showing that both Virus and Valiente are skilled mat wrestlers in addition to the high flying action that signifies Lucha Libre. The champion Valiente earned the first fall by pinning Virus by tying him up with an inverted Boston crab variation. Valiente was looking to finish the second fall quickly, but the more experienced Virus manages to tie up Valiente, pinning him to even the score between the two. In the third fall Valiente tried to execute the Valiente Special (Double springboard moonsault) but Virus moved out of the way, going for a Moonsault of his own. Valiente moved at the very last moment, quickly landing two gutbusters before pinning Virus. Virus appeared to raise his shoulder before three but it was counted anyway giving the victory to Valiente. After the match Virus raised Valiente's hand in victory as a sign of respect.

The third fall of the night was also a rematch from the previous week's Super Viernes as Mexico National Trios Champions MSM Fly (Máscara Dorada, Metro and Stuka, Jr.) wrestled Poder Mexica (Dragón Rojo, Jr., Misterioso II and Sangre Azteca) in a non-title match. It only took Poder Mexica to defeat the reigning champions two falls to one, giving the former champions the rights to challenge MSM Fly for the Mexican National Trios Championship on the June 18, 2010 Super Viernes.

The second match was originally scheduled to include Ángel de Plata teaming with his brother Ángel de Oro and Rush, but on the night he was replaced by Diamante without an explanation. The makeshift team defeated Los Cancerberos del Infierno (Cancerbero, Raziel and Euforia) in 12:57. The opening match featured the sons of El Felino, Puma King and Tiger Kid, nicknamed Los Gatos Negros (Spanish for "the Black Cats"), a play off the name of their father's group La Peste Negra. Los Gatos wrestled and lost to the team of Métalico and Staman two falls to one after 13:57.

| No. | Results | Stipulations | Times |
|---|---|---|---|
| 1 | Metálico and Starman defeated Puma King and Tiger Kid | Best two out of three falls Tag team match | 13:57 |
| 2 | Ángel de Oro, Diamante and Rush defeated Los Cancerberos del Infierno (Cancerbero, Euforia and Raziel) | Six-man tag team match | 12:57 |
| 3 | Poder Mexica (Dragón Rojo, Jr., Misterioso II and Sangre Azteca) defeated MSM Fly (Máscara Dorada, Metro and Stuka, Jr.) | Six-man tag team match | 07:37 |
| 4 | Valiente (C) defeated Virus | Singles match for the Mexican National Welterweight Championship | 18:18 |
| 5 | Brazo de Plata, Rayo de Jalisco Jr. and Shocker defeated Los Guerros de la Atlantida (Atlantis and Último Guerrero) and Gigante Bernard by disqualification | Six-man tag team match | 12:42 |
| 6 | Héctor Garza, Olímpico and Volador Jr. defeated El Hijo del Fantasma, Místico and Negro Casas | Relevos incredibles six-man tag team match | 16:37 |

== June 18, 2010 ==
CMLL Super Viernes
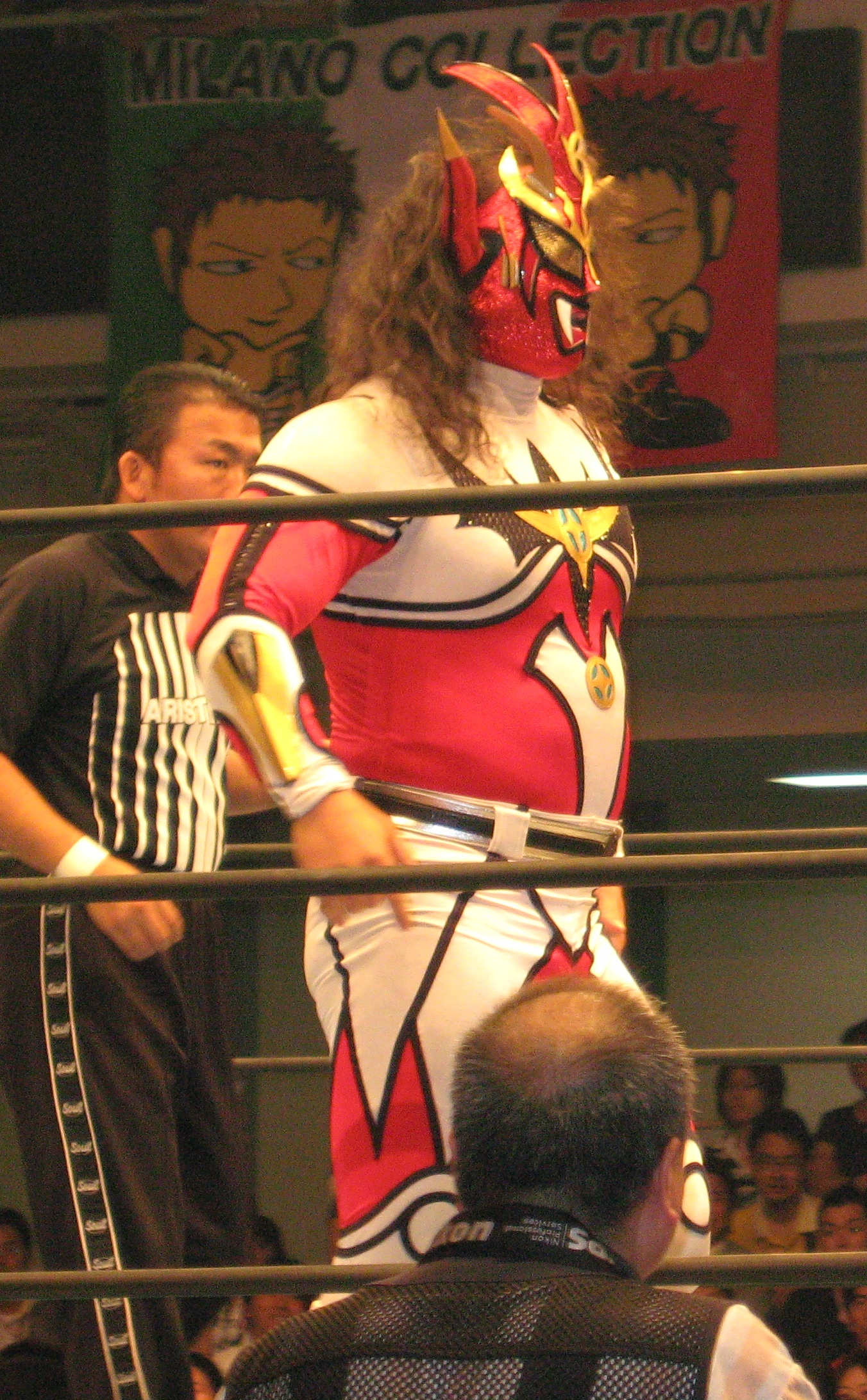
- Jushin Thunder Liger making his return to CMLL in the main event
- Promotion: Consejo Mundial de Lucha Libre (CMLL)
- Date: June 18, 2010
- City: Mexico City, Mexico
- Venue: Arena México

CMLL Super Viernes chronology
| ← Previous; Super Viernes June 11, 2010 | Next → Super Viernes June 25, 2010 |

The June 18, 2010 Super Viernes featured six matches in total, including a Lightning match and a match for the Mexican National Trios Championship. Following a low attendance figure the previous week, the June 18 show drew more fans for what was described as a "generous box office". The main event was a Best two out of three falls Six-man tag team match and saw the return of Rayo de Jalisco, Jr. to Super Viernes after several years absence. The match also marked the return of New Japan Pro-Wrestling (NJPW) wrestler Jushin Thunder Liger, who had last competed in CMLL in September and October 2009. The main event match was also the return match for La Sombra who had toured NJPW, participating in the 2010 Best of the Super Juniors. Liger teamed up with Los Guerreros de la Atlantida (Atlantis and Rey Bucanero) to take on Rayo de Jalisco, Jr., La Sombra and Blue Panther in the sixth and final match of the night. While Liger made a good showing for himself in the match the main focal point of the match was the confrontation of two of the biggest CMLL stars of the 1990s as Atlantis and Rayo de Jalisco, Jr. fought each other with intensity, tearing at each other's masks as the crowd cheered and jeered. The first fall was won by the rudo (bad guy) team as Rey Bucanero pinned La Sombra following Canadian Destroyer and Liger pinned Blue Panther after applying a Brainbuster. The second fall saw Rayo and Atlantis continuing their rivalry, although neither was involved in the fall as Panther tied up Bucanero with a "nudo" lock to pin him and La Sombra pinned Liger following a Tornillo Corkscrew moonsault splash off the top rope. The third fall lasted 6:30 with Los Guerreros and Liger taking the third and final fall when they applied the Muralla Guerrera, Los Guerreros' triple Submission hold, to their opponents forcing a submission for the victory.

The semi-main event featured a changing of the guard in La Ola Amarilla ("The Yellow Wave") as Taichi wrestled his last match for CMLL before returning to NJPW, while NJPW rookie Nobuo Yoshihashi made his CMLL debut. The two teamed up with Okumura to take on the team of El Hijo del Fantasma teaming with La Másacara and La Máscara's cousin Máximo. Taichi came to the ring wearing a wig to hide the fact that he had had his hair shaved off less than two weeks before following a loss to Máximo. The Exótico Máximo too pleasure in pulling the wig off Taichi, revealing his shaved head to the audience. The NJPW rookie gained the first pinfall when he pinned La Máscara after executing a Shining Wizard. The second fall came just 2 minutes and 9 seconds later as Hijo del Fantasma forced Yoshihashi to submit to a Boston Crab while La Máscara forced Okumura to submit to his Campana Pendulum submission hold. Yoshihashi lost his debut match when Taichi was pinned by Hijo del Phantom and Máximo pinned Okumura. Following the match Taichi took the microphone and thanked the Mexican fans for the hospitality he had received during his tour and promised to return to Mexico in November.

The fourth match was for the Mexican National Trios Championship with the champions MSM Fly (Máscara Dorada, Metro and Stuka, Jr.) defended the title against Poder Mexica (Dragón Rojo, Jr., Misterioso II and Sangre Azteca). MSM Fly had defeated Poder Mexica in the finals of a tournament to win the vacant championship and also had a successful title defense against Poder Mexica in April, but had lost to them the previous week to earn the title match. Despite being the rudos Poder Mexica had the majority of the fan support on the night as the crowd changed "Mexica" throughout the match. The match between the two teams was described as the "best match of the night" and saw both teams pull out all the stops. The challengers took the first fall as Misterioso II pinned Stuka, Jr. following a La Rosa Driver off the second rope. The champions evened the score just over three minutes later as Stuka, Jr. Powerbombed Dragón Rójo, Jr. and Máscara Dorada pinned Sangre Azteca following a Frog splash. Poder Mexican seemed to have the third fall won as Azteca and Misterioso II disposed of Stuka, Jr. and Máscara Dorada only to see Metro surprise team captain Dragón Rójo, Jr. with a German suplex, pinning him while Azteca and Misterioso II were preoccupied by prematurely celebrating their victory. Following the match Azteca and Misterioso II question Dragón Rójo, Jr. about what happened.

The third match was the Lighting match, a single fall match with a ten-minute time limit. That week the Lighting match involved two rudas as CMLL World Women's Champion La Amapola faced off against Princesa Sujei, who had trimmed down since the last time she appeared on Super Viernes. Sujei came to the ring wearing the Pro Wrestling Revolution (PWR) Women's Championship belt she had won from Lady Apache only a few days prior to the show. La Amapola proved to be too much for Princesa Sujei as she pinned the PWR champion following a Double knee backbreaker, ending the match at 7 minutes, 30 seconds.

The second match of the night saw the storyline between Doctor X and Fabián el Gitano finally appeared on Super Viernes after developing for months on CMLL's secondary shows. Fabián teamed up with Rey Cometa and Pegasso to take on the Los Guerreros Tuareg team of Doctor X, Loco Max and Hooligan. The highlights of the match were the encounters between Doctor X and Fabián el Gitano as the two continued their storyline, building to a future Lucha de Apuesta, mask vs. mask match between the two. Fabián's team won the first fall by pinfall and the second fall by disqualification when the referee saw Doctor X land a low blow on Fabián. The opening match saw the team of Disturbio and Camorra defeated Camaleón and Robin, the son of José Aarón Alvarado Nieves, who had wrestled as Robin Hood and Brazo Cibernético.

| No. | Results | Stipulations | Times |
|---|---|---|---|
| 1 | Disturbio and Camorra defeated Camaleón and Robin | Best two out of three falls Tag team match | 12:35 |
| 2 | Fabián el Gitano, Rey Cometa and Pegasso defeated Guerreros Tuareg (Doctor X, Loco Max and Hooligan) by disqualification | Six-man tag team match | 14:27 |
| 3 | La Amapola defeated Princesa Sujei | Lightning match (One fall, 10 minute time-limit match) | 07:37 |
| 4 | MSM Fly (Máscara Dorada, Metro and Stuka Jr.) (c) defeated Poder Mexica (Dragón Rojo, Jr., Misterioso II and Sangre Azteca) | Six-man tag team match for the Mexican National Trios Championship | 18:18 |
| 5 | La Máscara, Máximo and El Hijo del Fantasma defeated La Ola Amarilla (Taichi, Okumura and Nobuo Yoshihashi) | Six-man tag team match | — |
| 6 | Jushin Thunder Liger, Atlantis and Rey Bucanero defeated Rayo de Jalisco, Jr., Blue Panther and La Sombra | Six-man tag team match | 15:20 |
(c) / – the champion(s) heading into the match

== June 25, 2010 ==
CMLL Super Viernes
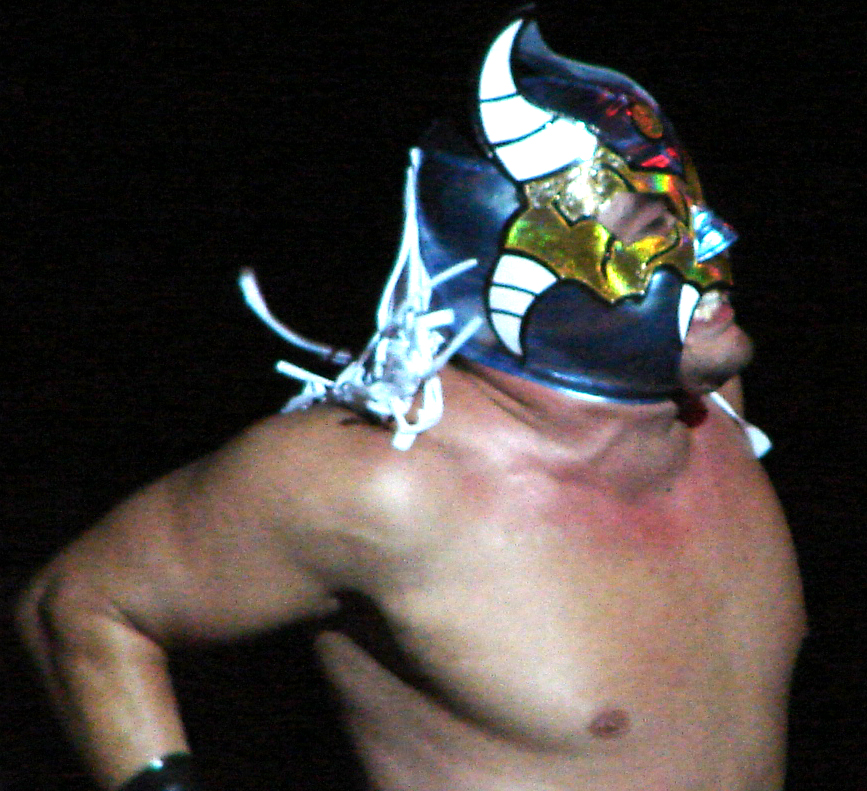
- Averno, part of the winning team in the fifth match.
- Promotion: Consejo Mundial de Lucha Libre (CMLL)
- Date: June 25, 2010
- City: Mexico City, Mexico
- Venue: Arena México

CMLL Super Viernes chronology
| ← Previous; Super Viernes June 18, 2010 | Next → Super Viernes July 2, 2010 |

The June 25, 2010 Super Viernes featured six matches in total, including a Lightning match in the Mini-Estrella division. The focal point of the show was the return of Mr. Niebla to in-ring action after being inactive for several months due to a knee injury. Prior to the main event Negro Casas was awarded the Copa Bobby Bonales, awarded to Casas for being voted "best technical wrestler" by the CMLL wrestlers and presented by Daniel Aceves, son of Bobby Bonales and a former Olympic gold medalist. Following the presentation of the Cup Casas, El Felino and Mr. Niebla, collectively known as La Peste Negra ("The Black Plague") wrestled in the main event against Místico, La Sombra and Shocker. "The Stinky Ones", as Peste Negra is also known as, took control of the first fall, with Mr. Niebla's comedic in-ring action drawing cheers from the crowd despite the group is supposed to be a rudo (bad guy) group. La Peste Negra won the first fall when El Felino pinned Shocker and Negro Casas forced Místico to submit. The tecnico (good guy) team fought back and won the second fall 2:46 later when Místico pinned Negro Casas and Shocker got his revenge by pinning El Felino. The third fall lasted 8:49 and saw Mr. Niebla push La Sombra into the referee Baby Richards to distract him momentarily after which Mr. Niebla faked being fouled by his opponent. Mr. Niebla's acting was convincing enough for the referee to disqualify the tecnico team and award the match to La Peste Negra.

Japanese junior Heavyweight legend Jushin Thunder Liger continued his tour of Mexico as he tagged with Los Hijos del Averno ("The Sons of Hell"; Averno and Mephisto) to take on the team of Blue Panther, La Máscara and El Hijo del Fantasma. Jushin Thunder Liger's tour of Mexico had seen him undefeated up to this point and his dominance continues as he pins La Máscara following a Ligerbomb to win the first fall. In the second fall La Máscara forced Averno to submit to his Campana ("Bell") submission hold while Blue Panther pinned Mephisto to tie the scores at 1-1. The match was the longest match of the night as the third and deciding fall did not occur until after 19:22 of wrestling and saw Liger victorious once again as he pinned Blue Panther following yet another Ligerbomb.

The fourth match of the evening featured the makeshift tecnico team of Fabián el Gitano, El Sagrado, Stuka, Jr. wrestling against the team known as Los Cancerberos del Infierno (The Infernal Cerberus"; Cancerbero, Raziel and Virus). Los Cancerberos had been challenging Stuka, Jr. and partner Fuego to defend the CMLL Arena Coliseo Tag Team Championship against them for a while and hoped to earn a match if they could defeat Stuka, Jr. and partners. Their hopes of earning a title match were dashed as El Sagrado pinned Virus following a Moonsault to take the victory for his team at 14:05.

The Lighting match of the night featured two wrestlers from CMLL's Mini-Estrella division as two of its youngest competitors faced off with Eléctrico facing the rookie Astral. Eléctrico came off as the more experienced wrestler as Astral looked a bit unsteady or uncertain at times and experience seemed to make the difference as Eléctrio landed a Moonsault and then pinned Astral to win the match in 7 minutes, 41 seconds.

The second match of the night saw a storyline feud develop between the two sides as the tecnico team Los Ángeles Celestiales (Ángel Azteca, Jr., Ángel de Oro and Ángel de Plata) took on the rudos Arkangel de la Muerte, Puma King and Tiger Kid. During the match Puma King seemed to take extra care to inflict pain on Ángel de Oro, tearing at his mask during the match and cheating at every possible opportunity. The rudo team won the match when Puma King landed a low blow on Ángel de Oro and then quickly pinned him for the victory. Following the match the rudo trio attacked Ángel de Oro and tore his mask off. The storyline between the teams lead to everyone but Arkangel de la Muerte being involved in a 12-Man Steel cage match at the 2010 Infierno en el Ring event.

In the opening match the tecnico team of Metálico and Trueno defeated rudos Cholo and Zayco in just over 10 minutes.

| No. | Results | Stipulations | Times |
|---|---|---|---|
| 1 | Metálico and Trueno defeated Cholo and Zayco | Best two out of three falls Tag team match | 10:38 |
| 2 | Arkangel de la Muerte, Puma King and Tiger Kid defeated Los Ángeles Celestiales (Ángel Azteca Jr., Ángel de Oro and Ángel de Plata) | Six-man tag team match | 13:40 |
| 3 | Eléctrico defeated Astral | Lightning match (One fall, 10 minute time-limit match) | 07:41 |
| 4 | Fabián el Gitano, El Sagrado, Stuka, Jr. defeated Los Cancerberos del Infierno (Cancerbero, Raziel and Virus) | Six-man tag team match | 14:05 |
| 5 | Los Hijos del Averno (Averno and Mephisto) and Jushin Thunder Liger defeated Blue Panther, El Hijo del Fantasma and La Máscara | Six-man tag team match | 19:22 |
| 6 | La Peste Negra (El Felino, Mr. Niebla and Negro Casas) defeated Místico, La Sombra and Shocker | Six-man tag team match | 14:25 |
