= La Ola Amarilla =

Professional wrestling stable

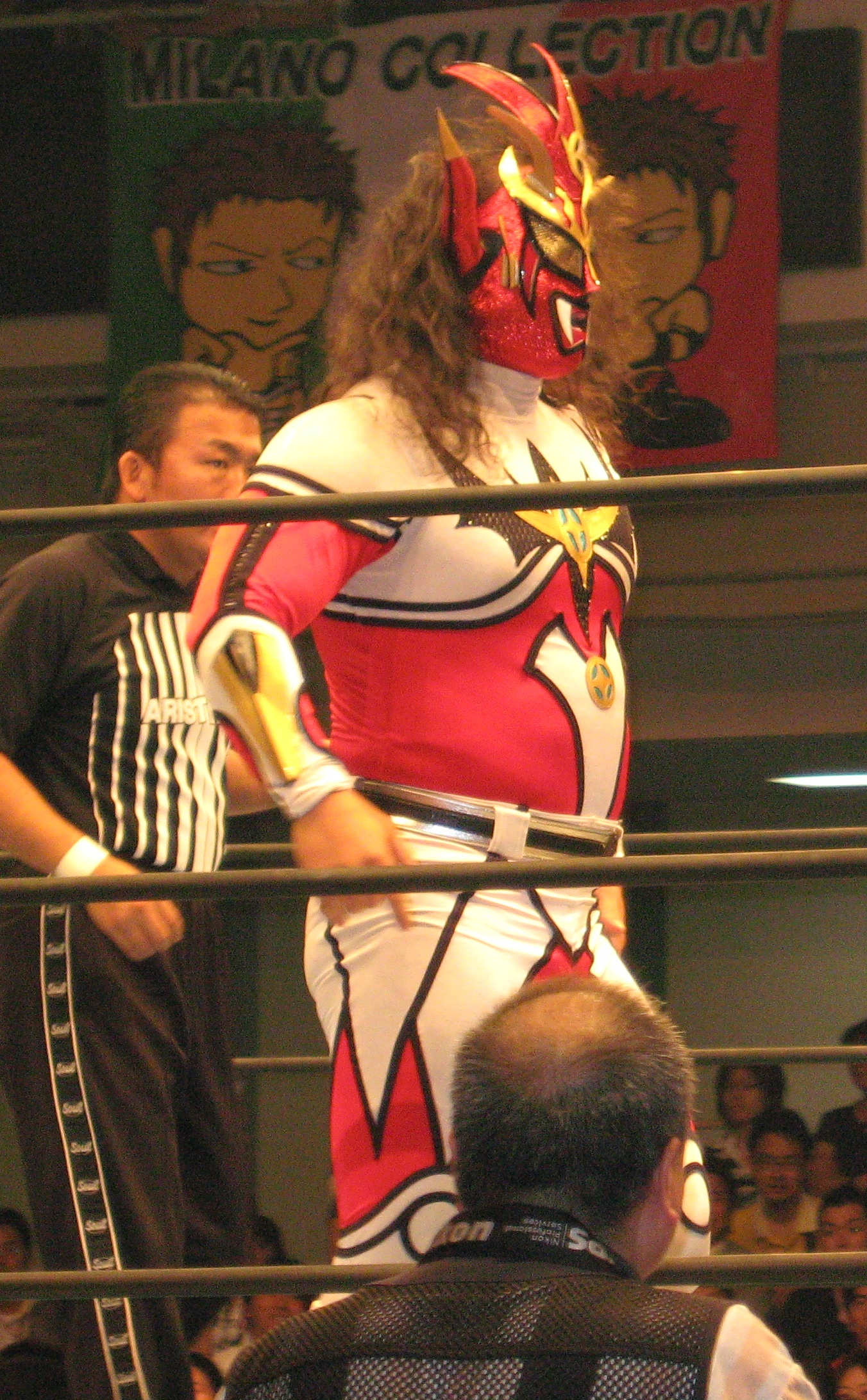
- Jushin Thunder Liger, former member of La Ola Amarilla

Stable
- Members: Okumura; Raijin; Fujin; Hajime Ohara; Jushin Thunder Liger; Masada; Yujiro; Naito; Namajague; Tanahashi; YOSHI-HASHI; Taichi; Kamaitachi; Short term members
- Combined billed weight: La Ola Amarilla; La Fiebre Amarilla
- Billed from: Japan
- Debut: 2005

La Ola Amarilla (Spanish for "The Yellow Wave") was a professional wrestling group, also known as a stable in Consejo Mundial de Lucha Libre (CMLL). The group was founded in 2005 for Japanese-born wrestlers, often wrestlers touring CMLL through a talent-sharing agreement with New Japan Pro-Wrestling (NJPW).

== History ==
La Ola Amarilla was created in 2005 by CMLL as a name of a group of Japanese wrestlers working full-time for CMLL consisting of Okumura, Hajime Ohara and Masada. The name was inspired by the name La Ola Blanca ("The White Wave") the name of the legendary team of Dr. Wagner and Ángel Blanco. Okumura, Ohara and Masada were all low ranking wrestlers in CMLL with Ohara and Masada remaining in the same position throughout their time there. Okumura would occasionally work higher up the ranks when he was teamed up with NJPW visitors such as Shinsuke Nakamura and Hiroshi Tanahashi, two of NJPW's rising stars who had come to Mexico to gain international experience. Okumura teamed with Nakamura and Tanahashi, as well as worked as their guide and contact outside the ring. The first major showing for La Ola Amarilla was the 2005 International Gran Prix with La Ola Amarilla representatives Tanahashi and Nakamura taking part in the match. The trio worked on CMLL's 72nd Anniversary show, losing to the all-Mexican team of Último Guerrero, Rey Bucanero and Averno. The 2006 International Gran Prix had no less than five Ola Amarilla members involved, Okumura, Ohara, Masada, Milano Collection AT and Katsushi Takemura teamed up with Pierroth, Jr., Marco Corleone and Johnny Stamboli to form "Team International". La Ola Amarilla was represented by Okumura, Hirooki Goto, Minoru Suzuki, Último Dragón and Jushin Thunder Liger in the 2007 International Gran Prix, although only Okumura, Ohara and Goto worked regularly for CMLL at the time. Ohara and Goto would both remain in Mexico for almost a year, returning to NJPW in the summer of 2007 leaving Okumura as the only Japanese wrestler in CMLL. In the fall of 2007 Shigeo Okumura broke his collar bone when an Asai Moonsault attempt by the inexperienced Fabián el Gitano went wrong and Fabián struck Okumura with his knees, breaking the bone. The injury sidelined Okumura for the remainder of 2007 and a large part of 2008.

=== No Limit and Jushin Thunder Liger ===
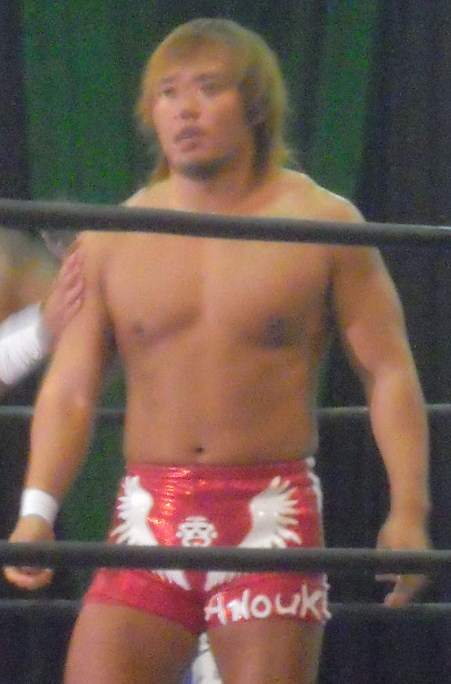
Half of "No Limit" Naito

In the summer of 2009 Okumura was once again teamed up with a couple of Japanese wrestlers on a "Learning trip", this time he teamed with No Limit (Yujiro and Naito), reforming the "Anti-Mexico" La Ola Amarilla. For the first time the team was given a strong push by CMLL, booked to win a series of high-profile matches against various Mexican tecnicos (Faces or "good guys"). All three members of La Ola Amarila were involved in a 15-man Lucha de Apuesta steel cage match, which was the main event of CMLL's 2009 Infierno en el Ring event. Okumura escaped the cage as the fourth man and watched as Naito defeated Toscano to win the match. Following the match No Limit's focus was on Black Warrior, who had turned on them during the cage match. Over the summer of 2009 Ola Amarilla received further reinforcement as Jushin Thunder Liger toured Mexico. Okumura teamed with Liger, Yujiro and Naito to defeat the team of Último Guerrero, Atlantis, Black Warrior and Héctor Garza, representing Mexico in one of the main events of CMLL's 76th Anniversary Show. The following week Yujiro was scheduled to team with Camorra in the 2009 Gran Alternativa tournament where a veteran teams with a rookie. Before the match Okumura made his way to the ring, objecting to Yujiro being forced to team with a Mexico and in a scripted moment, attacked Camorra and threw him out of the ring, taking his place. Yujiro and Okumura defeated Toscano and Rouge in the first round of the tournament, then were victorious against Héctor Garza and Ángel de Plata, before defeating Místico and Ángel de Oro in the finals to win the 2009 Gran Alternativa. Following the Gran Alternativa tournament Okumura began focusing on Máximo, while No Limit began a storyline with the team of El Terrible and El Texano, Jr. Okumura and Máximo faced off several times, usually as part of trios matches and each time the tension between the two wrestlers built. On November 5, 2009 the two faced off in a Lucha de Apuesta match, which saw Okumura win his first ever Apuesta, leaving Máximo bald in the process. The storyline feud between No Limit and Black Warrior reached its conclusion on October 16, 2009 as Black Warrior faced Yujiro in a Lucha de Apuesta, hair vs. hair match that Yujiro won two falls to one, forcing Black Warrior to have his hair shaved off after the match. After the storyline with Black Warrior ended No Limit began working with the team of El Texano, Jr. and El Terrible in a feud that led to a Lucha de Apuesta hair vs. hair match between the two teams that was the main event of CMLL's Sin Salida show on December 4, 2009. After being successful throughout the summer and fall No Limit finally lost to Texano, Jr. and Terrible at Sin Salida and were both shaved completely bald after the match per Lucha Libre traditions.

=== Taichi, Tanahashi, Yoshihashi and Liger ===
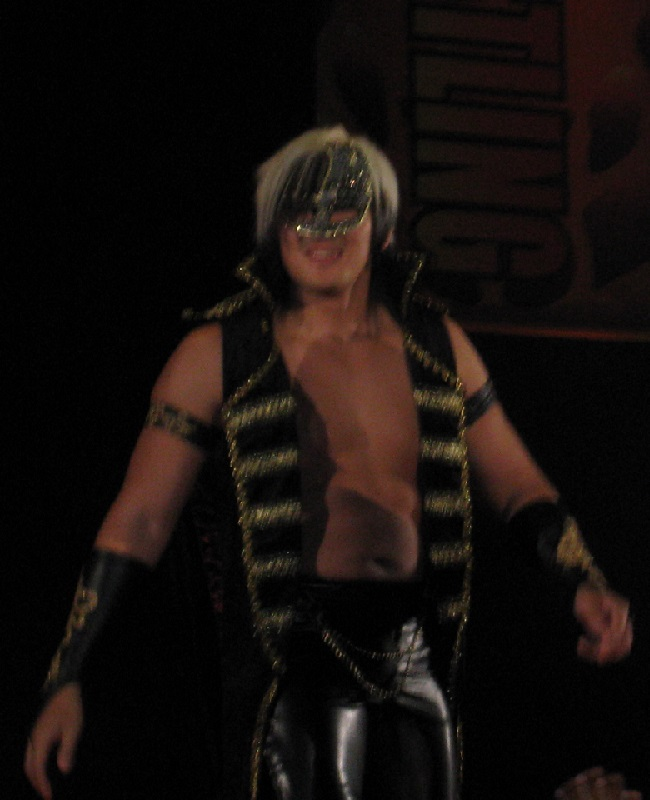
Taichi, made several trips to CMLL over the years.

While Yujiro and Naito left Mexico for NJPW by the end of 2009 Naito returned for a series of matches in January and was later joined by NJPW rookie Taichi to keep La Ola Amarilla alive in CMLL. Taichi made his Arena Mexico debut on February 19, 2010, during CMLL's Super Viernes show, teaming with Naito and Ray Mendoza, Jr. to defeat La Peste con Amour ("The Love Plague") (Máximo and Mr. Niebla) and Jon Strongman. Negro Casas travelled to Japan to work an extended tour for New Japan Pro-Wrestling in April and May 2010. During the tour he wrestled several tag team matches against Jushin Thunder Liger, ending the tour with a singles match against Liger on May 3, 2010 where he lost the CMLL Middleweight Championship to Liger. Over the following months Taichi and Okumura were the only two active Ola Amarilla members in CMLL, often teaming with Rey Mendoza, Jr. to round out the trio. During the April 30, 2010 Super Viernes Okumura and Taichi teamed up with Último Guerrero and Dragón Rojo, Jr. to defeat Strongman, Místico and two-thirds of the CMLL World Trios Champions El Hijo del Fantasma and La Máscara. Following the match Okumura challenged the Trios champions for a title match the following week. A week later, at the May 7, 2010 Super Viernes Okumura and Taichi were joined by Hiroshi Tanahashi as they challenged for and won the CMLL World Trios Championship when they defeated Héctor Garza, Hijo del Fantasma and La Máscara for the belts. At the following week's Super Viernes La Ola Amarilla lost to Máscara Dorada, La Máscara and La Sombra in a non-title match, setting up a title match for the following week. On May 21, 2010 La Ola Amarilla's title reign came to an end, just 14 days after they won the belts the Japanese Trio was unseated by Máscara Dorada, La Máscara and La Sombra. Tanahashi returned to Japan shortly after losing the trios championship.

At the May 28, 2010 Super Viernes Taichi teamed up with Okumura and Ray Mendoza. Jr. to take on Máximo, Volador Jr. and El Hijo del Fantasma. In the second fall Máximo tried to kiss Taichi during the match which caused Taichi to respond by kicking Máximo in the groin area in full view of the referee, drawing a disqualification loss for his team, building on the storyline that Máximo's effeminate Exótico ring character bothered Taichi. The two met in a Lucha de Apusta on June 6, 2010 in the main event of the 2010 Sin Salida¨ with both wrestlers putting their hair on the line. Máximo defeated Taichi, forcing the Japanese wrestler to have his hair shaved off after the match. Following a few more appearances for CMLL Taichi returned to Japan. Taichi wrestled his last match for CMLL at the June 18, 2010 Super Viernes, where he teamed with Okumura and new Ola Amarilla member, NJPW rookie Nobuo Yoshihashi who made his CMLL debut on the night. After winning the match Taichi promised to return to CMLL in November, 2010. In July 2010 Jushin Thunder Liger came to CMLL for an extended tour of the company, making La Ola Amarilla a trio once again. During the summer of 2010 Yoshihashi only appeared sporadically in Arena Mexico, mainly working at CMLL's secondary venues, a lower position that Ola Amarilla had occupied since mid-2009. In August 2010 Liger qualified for the finals of the 2010 Universal Championship and had Okumura in his corner for the match against La Sombra. With Okumura's aid Jushin Thunder Liger pinned La Sombra and became the 2010 Universal Champion. Liger was scheduled to be one of 14 men to take part of a Lucha de Apuesta steel cage match that will be the main event of the CMLL 77th Anniversary Show, while Okumura and Yoshihashi continue to play supporting roles. Liger was the seventh man to leave the steel cage, keeping his mask safe. The match came down to La Sombra pinning Olímpico to unmask him.

=== La Fiebre Amarilla ===
In March 2012 NJPW trainee Kyosuke Mikami travelled to Mexico for an extended learning excursion. He adopted the masked ring persona "Namajague", a name and mask inspired by the imagery of the Japanese folk demon Namahage. While Mikami had worked primarily as a "face" (wrestling term for someone who portrays the good guy) he was given a "heel" or rudo character and teamed up with Okumura, collectively known as La Fiebre Amarilla ("the Yellow Fever"). He made his debut as Namajage on February 2, 2012 teaming with Okumura and Misterioso, Jr., defeating the team of Black Warrior, El Sagrado and Sangre Azteca. In September 2012 La Fiebre Amarilla unsuccessfully challenged for the CMLL Arena Coliseo Tag Team Championship as defending champions Fuego and Stuka, Jr. were victorious. Only weeks later Namajague was part of CMLL's largest annual show asrthey celebrated the 79th Anniversary of CMLL as he teamed up with Okumura and Taichi, as La Ola Amarilla, La Ola was defeated by three of CMLL's top tecnicos, Ángel de Oro, La Sombra and Titán. In the months following the Anniversary show Namajague and Okumura developed a long running storyline with Stuka, Jr. and Rey Cometa that evolved into the main event of the 2013 Homenaje a Dos Leyendas show contested under Luchas de Apuestas rules where Namajague and Stuka, Jr. both risked their masks and Okumura and Rey Cometa would risk their hair on the outcome of the match. On March 3, 2013, Namajague and Okumura defeated Fuego and Stuka, Jr. to win the CMLL Arena Coliseo Tag Team Championship, Mikami's first professional wrestling championship. On March 15, 2013 Okumura and Namajague were defeated by Stuka, Jr. and Rey Cometa in the main event of the 2013 Homenaje a Dos Leyendas show, forcing Okumura to have all his hair shaved off and Namajague was unmasked and had to reveal his real name, Kyosuke Mikami, as per lucha libre traditions. Mikami returned to New Japan in January 2014 and was replaced in La Fiebre Amarilla by another masked Japanese rookie, Kamaitachi. On July 13, 2014 Kamaitachi and Okumura challenged for the CMLL Arena Coliseo Tag Team Championship, but were defeated by champions Delta and Guerrero Maya, Jr. On January 24, 2016, Kamaitachi during Fantastica Mania 2016, won The CMLL World Lightweight Championship defeating Dragon Lee. During Fantastica Mania, it was announced that Young Lions Sho Tanaka and Yohei Komatsu would be heading to CMLL for their excursions joining the group and they would have been known there as "Raijin" and "Fujin" respectively, named after The Gods of Thunder and Wind.

Okumura proceeded to team with Kawato-san in 2018 to 2020, Yota in 2022 & 2023, Yutani since 2025 and Shoma Kato since 2026. It is unknown if these are officially considered extensions of La Ola Amarilla.

== Guest appearances ==
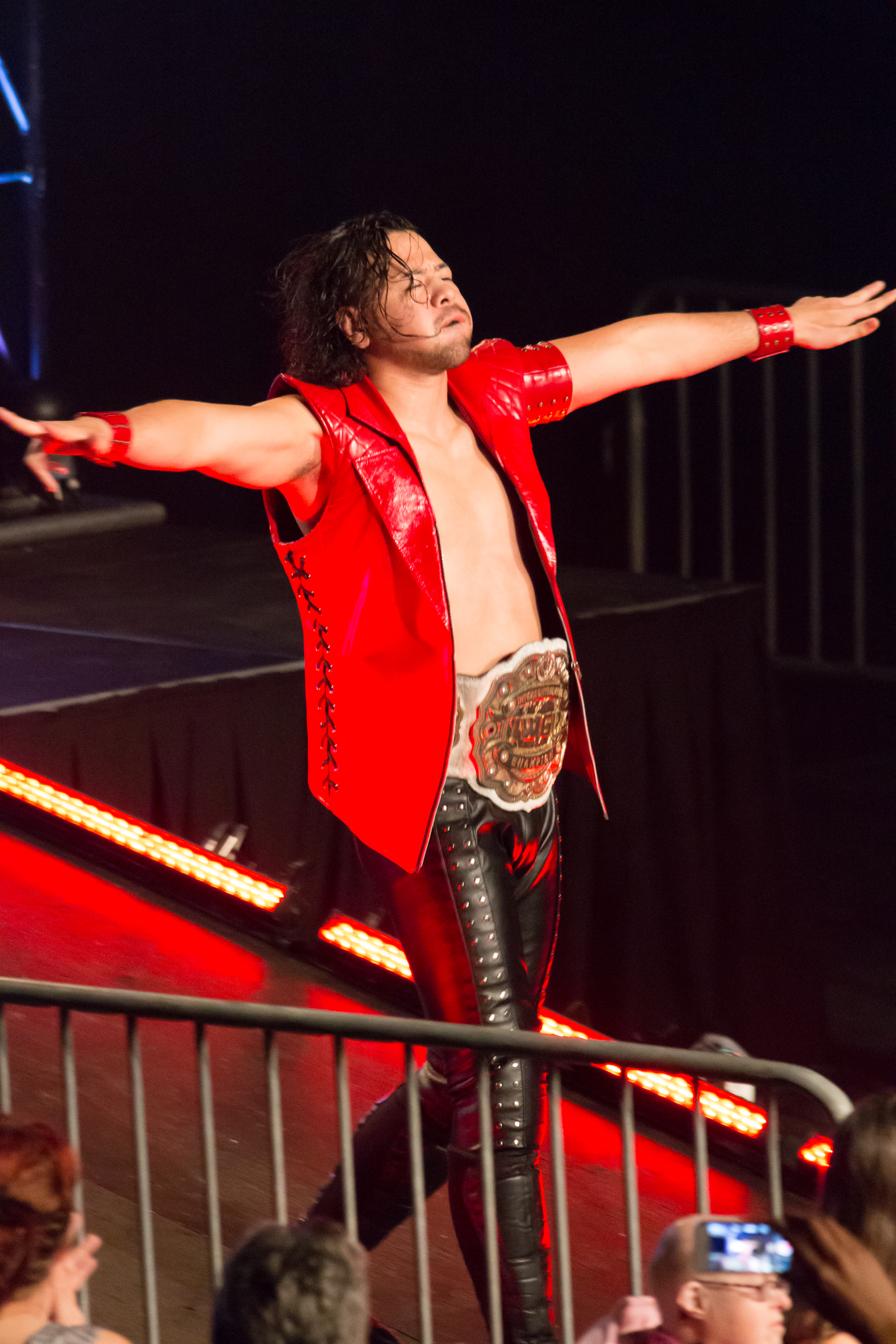
Shinsuke Nakamura, who made a few CMLL appearances as part of La Ola Amarilla.

La Ola Amarilla has served as host to a variety of Japanese natives when they come to CMLL for a short or a long period of time, some Japanese wrestlers who only made brief appearances for CMLL were promoted as members of La Ola Amarilla such since the creation of the group in 2005. The following is a list of Japanese natives who have briefly worked as part of La Ola Amarilla:

- Nakamura
- Katsushi Takemura
- Milano Collection AT
- Goto
- Minoru Suzuki
- Último Dragón
- Ishii

== Championships and accomplishments ==
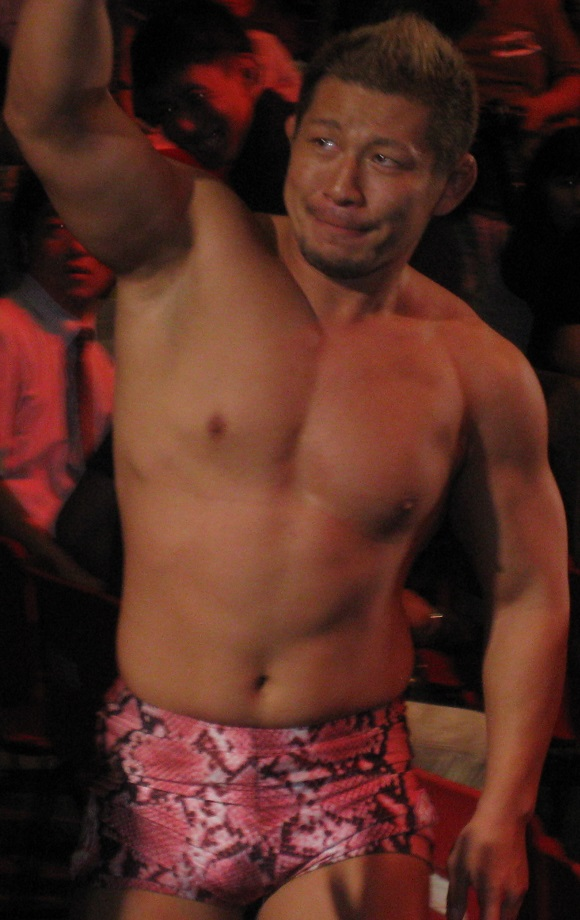
Yujiro, teamed up with Okumura to win the 2009 Gran Alternativa.

- Consejo Mundial de Lucha Libre
  - CMLL Arena Coliseo Tag Team Championship (1 time) – Namajague and Okumura
  - CMLL Universal Championship (2010) – Jushin Thunder Liger
  - CMLL World Lightweight Championship (1 time) - Kamaitachi
  - CMLL World Middleweight Championship (1 time) – Jushin Thunder Liger
  - CMLL World Trios Championship (1 time) – Okumura, Hiroshi Tanahashi and Taichi
  - Occidente Light Heavyweight Championship (1 time) – Okumura
  - Gran Alternativa: 2009 – Yujiro and Okumura

== Luchas de Apuestas record ==
Winner (wager)	Loser (wager)	Location	Event	Date	Notes
Naito (hair)	Toscano (hair)	Mexico City	Infierno en el Ring	July 31, 2009	(Note: This was a 15-man steel cage elimination match, also including Yujiro, Shocker, Héctor Garza, Negro Casas, Black Warrior, El Terrible, El Texano, Jr., Shigeo Okumura, Blue Panther, Máximo, Ray Mendoza Jr., Heavy Metal and Mictlán)
Yujiro (hair)	Black Warrior (hair)	Mexico City	Gran Alternativa	October 16, 2009	
El Texano, Jr. and El Terrible (hair)	No Limit (hair) (Yujiro and Naito)	Mexico City	Sin Salida	December 4, 2009	
Okumura (hair)	Máximo (hair)	Mexico City	CMLL Super Viernes	November 5, 2009	
Máximo (hair)	Taichi (hair)	Mexico City	Sin Salida	June 6, 2010	
Stuka, Jr. (mask) and Rey Cometa (hair)	La Fiebre Amarilla (Okumura (hair) and Namajague (mask))	Mexico City	Homenaje a Dos Leyendas	March 15, 2013	
Rey Cometa (hair)	Namajague (hair)	Mexico City	Arena Mexico 57th Anniversary Show	April 26, 2013	
