= CMLL Super Viernes (May 2010) =

Mexican Professional wrestling show summary

In May 2010 the Mexican professional wrestling promotion Consejo Mundial de Lucha Libre (CMLL) will hold a total of four CMLL Super Viernes shows, all of which will take place Arena México on Friday nights. CMLL will not hold any special events on Fridays that would force a cancellation such as a pay-per-view (PPV). Some of the matches from Super Viernes are taped for CMLL's weekly shows that air in Mexico the week following the Super Viernes show. Super Viernes often features storyline feud between two wrestlers or group of wrestlers that develop from week to week, often coming to a conclusion at a major CMLL event or in a match on Friday nights between the individuals. In total Super Viernes featured 24 matches with 81 wrestlers appearing in matches during April. This includes six women and eight Mini-Estrellas. CMLL only held one match featuring the women's division, two featuring the Mini-Etrellas and four Lightning matches. Taichi and Okumura are the only wrestler to appear on all four Super Vierens shows in May.

== May 7, 2010 ==
CMLL Super Viernes
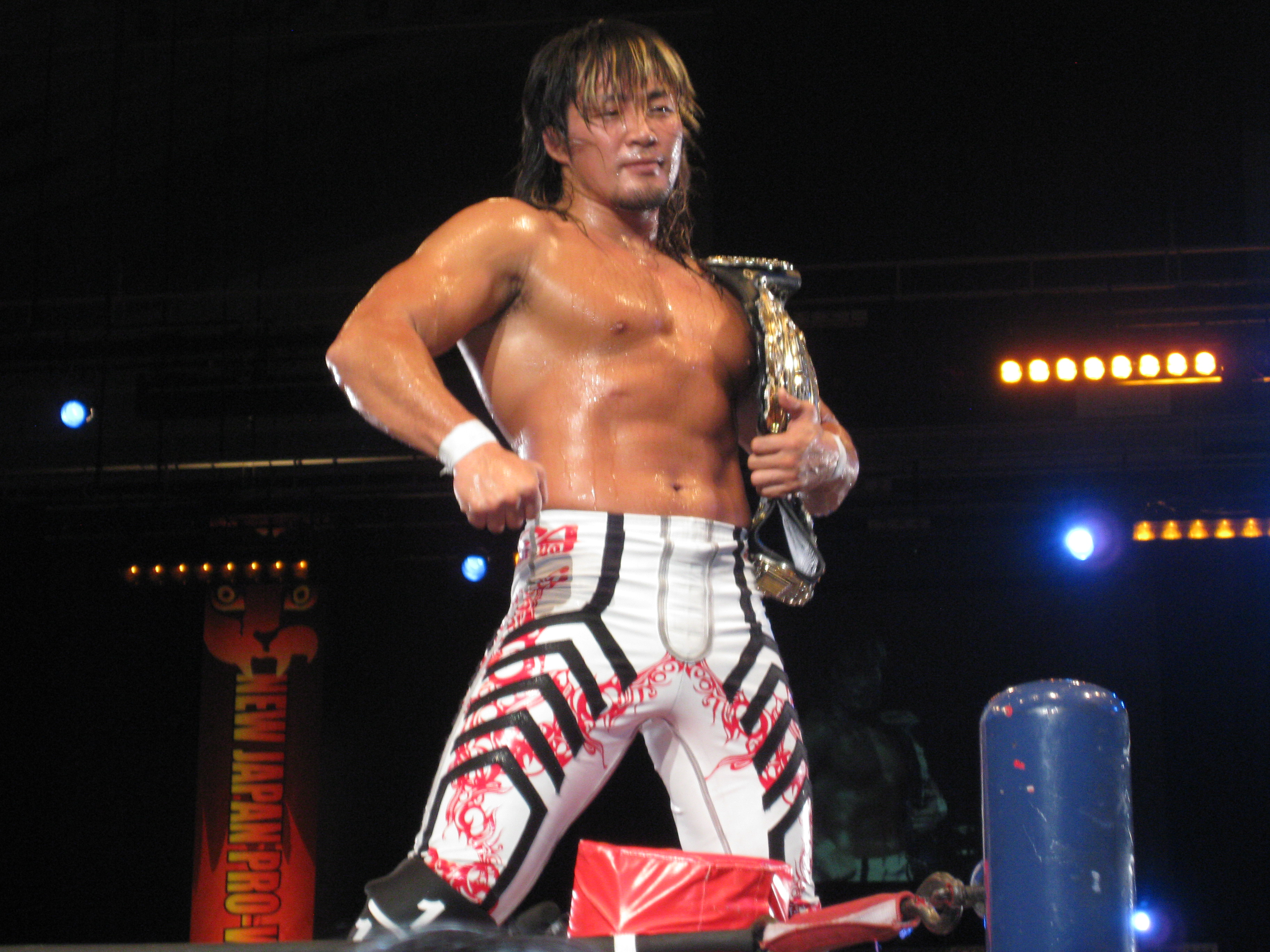
- Hiroshi Tanahashi, beginning his CMLL tour on the night of the show
- Promotion: Consejo Mundial de Lucha Libre (CMLL)
- Date: May 7, 2010
- City: Mexico City, Mexico
- Venue: Arena México

CMLL Super Viernes chronology
← Previous; Super Viernes April 30, 2010	Next → Super Viernes May 14, 2010

The May 7, 2010 Super Viernes show featured a total of six matches, with the main event being the CMLL World Trios Champions Héctor Garza, El Hijo del Fantasma and La Máscara defending the title against La Ola Amarilla (Hiroshi Tanahashi, Okumura and Taichi). The match was a result of Taichi and Okumura defeating Hijo del Fantasma and La Mascara in the main event of the previous week's Super Vierne. In the week leading up to the match Garza claimed he was not told that he was defending the title, voicing his displeasure over not being consulted. The match was Tanahashi's first appearance for CMLL since 2005 as he began a Mexican tour. The focal point of the match was the building tension between the Trios champions, with Garza not getting along with La Máscara and Hijo del Fantasma. During the first fall of the match Garza seemed to be out of position to help his partners on several occasions. This was especially evident during the deciding moments of the first fall as Garza decided to pose on the turnbuckles while Tanahashi pinned La Máscara and Taichi pinned Hijo del Fantasma. Between falls the champions argued with Garza seemingly apologizing to the others. The second fall saw La Máscara and Hijo del Fantasma wrestle without tagging in Garza. Garza did not enter the ring until both La Máscara and Hijo del Fantasma leapt out of the ring, taking the opportunity to roll up Hiroshi Tanahashi for the second fall. In the third fall Garza finally turned rúdo (bad guy) after months of teasing when he clotheslined both La Máscara and Hijo del Fantasma and walked out of the ring, leaving them open for a High Fly Flow (Frog splash) by Tanahashi to gain the third and deciding pinfall. With the victory Okumura, Taichi and Tanahashi became the first non-Mexican and non-CMLL workers (Taichi and Tanahashi) to win the Trios Championship.

The semi-main event featured the finalist novatos of the 2010 Gran Alternativa tournament, Delta and Pólvora on opposite teams as a reward for reaching the finals the previous week. Delta teamed with Volador Jr. and La Sombra to take on Pólvora, Averno and Mephisto. The first fall ended after 5 minutes and 30 seconds when Averno and Mephisto pinned Volador Jr. following a double Powerbomb. The second and the third fall saw both novatos make mistakes during the match with Delta hurting his ankle after botching a move. La Sombra pinned Mephisto to win the second fall and later on Volador Jr. pinned Averno to win the match two falls to one.

In the fourth match of the night the father / son team of Brazo de Plata and Máximo teamed up with Toscano to face Los Hijos del Averno in the form of Ephesto, El Terrible and El Texano, Jr. After having won the first fall the tecnico team faces trouble on the second fall as Máximo seemingly hurt himself during a move. El Terrible tried to take advantage of the confusion and his a low blow, but was disqualified by the referee.

The evening's Lighting Match featured Arkangel de la Muerte going against Ángel Azteca, Jr. in a match that played off the fact that Arkangel was the one to unmask Ángel Azteca (not blood related to Azteca, Jr.) some years ago. The match sees both wrestlers fight both inside and outside of the ring until the more seasoned veteran Arkangel forces Ángel Azteca, Jr. to submit.

The second match of the night featured the high flying duo of Pegasso and Rey Cometa team up with rookie Rush to defeat Los Guerreros Tuareg, represented by Tuareg leader Nitro, Loco Max and Skándalo in two straight falls. The opening match saw Durango Kid almost get away with cheating as he pulled Sensei's mask off and then pinned him, only for the referee to notice it and disqualify Durango Kid and Apocalipsis, giving Sensei and Leono the victory.

No.	Results	Stipulations	Times
1	Leono and Sensei defeated Apocalipsis and Durango Kid	Best two out of three falls Tag team match	10:45
2	Pegasso, Rey Cometa and Rush defeated Guerreros Tuareg (Nitro, Loco Max and Skándalo)	Six-man tag team match	14:19
3	Arkangel de la Muerte defeated Ángel Azteca Jr.	Lightning match (One fall, 10 minute time-limit match)	06:30
4	Brazo de Plata, Máximo and Toscano defeated Los Hijos del Averno (Ephesto, El Terrible and El Texano Jr.)	Six-man tag team match	08:58
5	Delta, La Sombra and Volador Jr. defeated Los Hijos del Averno (Averno and Mephisto) and Pólvora	Six-man tag team match	17:49
6	La Ola Amarilla (Hiroshi Tanahashi, Okumura and Taichi) defeated Héctor Garza, El Hijo del Fantasma and La Máscara (C)	Six-man tag team match for the CMLL World Trios Championship	23:40

== May 14, 2010 ==
CMLL Super Viernes
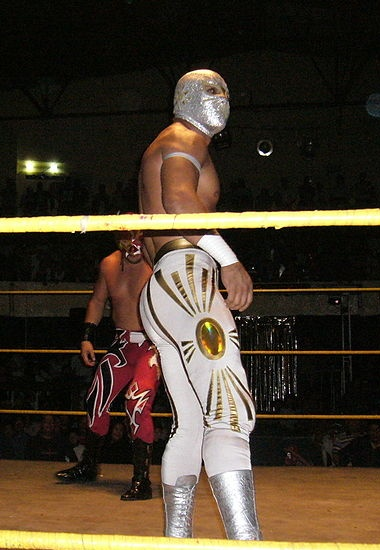
- Místico, part of the winning team in the main event
- Promotion: Consejo Mundial de Lucha Libre (CMLL)
- Date: May 7, 2010
- City: Mexico City, Mexico
- Venue: Arena México

CMLL Super Viernes chronology
← Previous; Super Viernes May 7, 2010	Next → Super Viernes May 21, 2010

The May 14, 2010 Super Viernes show featured a total of six matches with the main event being a Best two out of three falls Six-man tag team match between the técnico (good guy) team of Místico, Shocker and Jon Strongman facing off against Último Guerrero and La Peste Negra (Negro Casas and El Felino). The match was a combination of two ongoing storylines. First between Strongman and Último Guerrero who have been engaged in a rivalry since strongman made his debut in 2009. Secondly between Místico and El Felino, which was a direct result of the two teaming together for the 2010 Homenaje a Dos Leyendas in March. Casas made his return to Mexico after touring Japan with New Japan Pro-Wrestling for almost a month. The match started out with a display of mat wrestling, which even Strongman got involved with despite it not being his preferred wrestling style. After 6:40 of action Felino was able to roll Felino up for the three count while Negro Casas pinned Místico for the first fall. The técnicos quickly evened the sides when Guapos International pinned Felino and Negro Casas after 2:29. In the third fall Strongman begins with taking control of the match due to his power, easily lifting Casas over his head in a Military press, then walking around the ring before dropping Casas with a Military press slam. The rúdo team cheats their way to controlling the match, working over especially Shocker. Místico scored the deciding pinfall for his team as he pinned Negro Casas after a twisting Senton to earn the second fall for the tecnico team after 18:29 of wrestling.

The newly crowned CMLL World Trios Champions La Ola Amarilla (Hiroshi Tanahashi, Okumura and Taichi) took on the técnico trio of Máscara Dorada, La Máscara and La Sombra in a non-title match. Their opponents were originally slated to be Héctor Garza, El Texano, Jr. and El Terrible but CMLL changed the match a few days before the show to allow the técnico trio to face off against the champions instead. The tecnico team wins the first fall as La Sombra executes a move called "Starship Pain" (a Split-legged corkscrew moonsault) on Okumura, followed by Mascara Dorada pinned Taichi for the first fall. During the second fall La Sombra and Hiroshi Tanahashi developed a personal rivalry as they exchanged hard elbow blows and chops with the heavyweight Tanahashi coming out on top of the exchange. La Ola Amarilla takes the second fall after 4:35 when Okumura dropkicks La Sombra, followed by Taichi driving La Sombra into the mat with an Over the shoulder back to belly piledriver, also known as the "Schwein", leaving La Sombra vulnerable for Tanahashi to land his trademark "High Fly Flow" Frog splash for the pinfall. In the third fall the action sped up and even spilled outside of the ring, with Mascara Dorada throwing Tanahashi down the ramp with a Huracanrana headscissors take down. Later when Tanahashi attempts to leap off the top rope for another High Fly Flow Mascara Dorada intercepts him, attempting a to throw Tanahashi off the top rope with a Superplex only to have it blocked by Tanahashi. La Máscara climbed the ropes as well, combining his efforts with Mascara Dorada to land a double Superplex on Tanahashi, followed by a Plancha on Tanahashi. The entire tecnico team quickly pinned Tanahashi to win the match. As a result of their victory La Sombra, La Máscara and Mascara Dorada earned a shot at the CMLL WOrld Trios Championship at the May 21, 2010 Super Viernes.

In the Lightning match Averno faced El Hijo del Fantasma who came into the match trying to overcome the loss of the CMLL World Trios Championship he had suffered the previous week. The veteran Averno took control of the match but Hijo del Fantasma was able to continuously evade being pinned throughout the match, with less than 30 seconds left in the time limit a frustrated Averno pushed the referee to the side, landed a low blow and then pulled El Hijo del Fantasma's mask off. Averno managed to pin Hijo del Fantasma with only 19 seconds left on the clock, taking advantage of Hijo del Fantama as he was trying to cover up his unmasked face.

The third match of the evening saw two Poder Mexica (Sangre Azteca and Misterioso II) team up with the leader of Los Cancerberos del Infierno, Virus to face El Sagrado and the CMLL Arena Coliseo Tag Team Championship team of Stuka, Jr. and Fuego. The first fall sees Stuka, Jr. pin Virus following a Moonsault, Fuego pinning Sangre Azteca following a springboard splash and El Sagrado pinning Misterioso II to earn the first point for the técnico team. The rúdo team evens the score about five minutes later when they pin El Sagrado, followed by Sangre Azteca attacking the técnico's mascot KeMonito, tossing the dwarf out of the ring. The third fall is decided when Virus hits Fuego with a (Lariat as he leapt off the top rope, quickly pinning him to earn the two to one victory on the night.

The Mini-Estrellas match was originally scheduled to include Mascarita Dorada, but on the night he was replaced by Ultimo Dragoncito without an explanation. Mascarita Dorada has only worked for CMLL a few times since March, 2010 where he was fired and then re-hired a few weeks later. Ultimo Dragoncito teamed up with the CMLL World Mini-Estrella Champion Bam Bam and Shockercito to take on the rudo team of Pequeño Damián 666, Pequeño Nitro and Pequeño Black Warrior. The first fall goes to the técnico team with Dragoncito pinning Pequeño Damián 666 following a Moonsault, Bam Bam pinned Pequeño Nitro following a tigre tornillo, or corkscrew Moonsault and Shockercito pinned Pequeño Warrior. In the second fall the referee catches Pequeño Damián 666 cheating and disqualifies him, causing his team to lose two falls to none.

The opening match of Super Viernes usually features low ranking wrestlers in a tag team match, which was also the case for the May 14 event as Príncipe (formerly known as Principe Valiente) teamed up with Camaleón to face Súper Comando and Artillero, a team known as Los Hombres del Camouflage ("The Camouflaged Guys"). In the first fall Camaleón attempted to execute a Moonsault out of the ring, but was not able to execute it properly, only partially landing on his opponent. The first fall goes to the técnico team when Principe pins Super Comando. Los Hombres del Camouflage evened the score when Super Commando pinned Camaleon following a Michinoku Driver II. Los Hombres won the match when Super Comando pinned El Principe after 20 minutes of wrestling, making the opening match the longest match of the evening.

No.	Results	Stipulations	Times
1	Súper Comando and Artillero defeated Príncipe and Camaleón	Best two out of three falls Tag team match	20:12
2	Bam Bam, Shockercito and Ultimo Dragoncito defeated Pequeño Damián 666, Pequeño Nitro and Pequeño Black Warrior by disqualification	Six-man tag team match	19:03
3	Virus and Poder Mexica (Sangre Azteca and Misterioso II) defeated El Sagrado, Stuka, Jr. and Fuego	Six-man tag team match	18:02
4	Averno defeated El Hijo del Fantasma	Lightning match (One fall, 10 minute time-limit match)	09:39
5	Máscara Dorada, La Máscara and La Sombra defeated La Ola Amarilla (Hiroshi Tanahashi, Okumura and Taichi)	Six-man tag team match	15:02
6	Místico and Los Guapos Internacional (Shocker and Jon Strongman) defeated Último Guerrero and La Peste Negra (Negro Casas and El Felino)	Six-man tag team match	18:29

== May 21, 2010 ==
CMLL Super Viernes
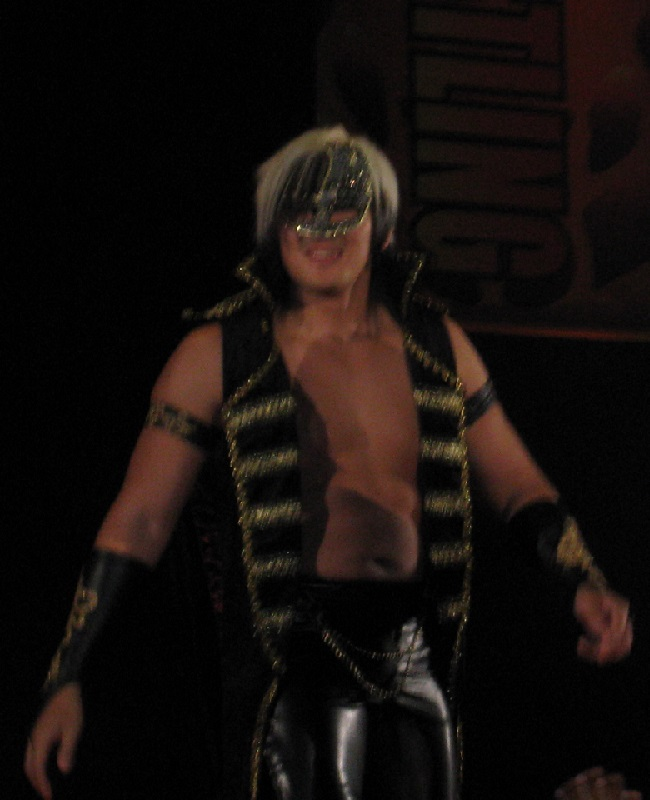
- Taichi, lost the CMLL World Trios Championship in the main event.
- Promotion: Consejo Mundial de Lucha Libre (CMLL)
- Date: May 21, 2010
- City: Mexico City, Mexico
- Venue: Arena México

CMLL Super Viernes chronology
← Previous; Super Viernes May 7, 2010	Next → Super Viernes May 21, 2010

The May 21, 2010 Super Viernes show featured six matches in total, with the main event of the night being a Best two out of three falls Six-man tag team match for the CMLL World Trios Championship with the champions La Ola Amarilla (Hiroshi Tanahashi, Okumura and Taichi) defending the belts against Máscara Dorada, La Máscara and La Sombra. The title match was a result of Máscara Dorada, La Máscara and La Sombra defeating the champions in a non-title match. In the week leading up to the event members of La Ola Amarilla claimed that the victory was a fluke, mainly due to Tanahashi suffering from "Montezuma's Revenge" from drinking the Mexican water, and that he was better for the May 21st event. The championship match had originally been announced as the semi-main event, the second to last match, but was later moved into the main event position. The match furthered the storyline between Taichi and La Máscara, which is believed to be building to a Lucha de Apuesta, mask vs. hair match, down the line. The Mexican team came out wearing the official football jersey of the Mexico national football team, in honor of the 2010 FIFA World Cup in South Africa. The Japanese team gains the first fall after more than seven minutes of action when Taichi blocks a Moonsault from La Máscara by putting up his knees then pinning La Máscara while Okumura drops Dorada with a Brainbuster to make it a double pinfall for the first fall. The Mexican team had to fight back, taking control of the match when La Sombra manages to pin both Okumura and Taichi when he lands on both of them with a Moonsault leap, tying the match up at one fall a piece. In the third fall Okumura and Taichi threw La Máscara to the floor and continued to beat him up outside the ring, only to be stopped when Máscara Dorada made a spectacular leap out of the ring onto all three wrestlers. This left the two captains in the ring as La Sombra and Tanahashi fought. Dorada and La Máscara disposed of Taichi and Okumura and joined La Sombra in the ring as he powerbombed Tanahashi. While his team mates held Tanahashi in position La Sombra climbed the ropes and leaped off the top rope landing on Hiroshi Tanahashi to get the third and deciding pinfall to become the new CMLL Trios Champions.

In the semi-main event Místico came out wearing the black, horn adorned mask he wore when he was a rúdo (bad guy), teasing that he was joining his scheduled opponents Averno, Mephisto and Ephesto. After teasing the turn for a moment he made a rude hand gesture towards the rúdo team and pulled off the mask to reveal his usual técnico mask underneath, a move that actually drew disapproving boos from the Arena México crowd. Místico was joined by Jon Strongman and Toscano for the six-man tag team match. The first fall came after 4:50 when Ephesto pinned Toscano and his partners executed a double Suplex on the 309 lb (140 kg) man, followed by a pin to win the first fall. The power of Strongman ensured the técnicos the second fall after he drove Mephisto into the mat with a Jackhammer. The third and deciding fall centered around Místico and Averno for most of the fall with Místico forcing Averno to submit as he applied La Mística (Tilt–a–whirl headscissors takedown into a Fujiwara armbar) winning the match for his team.

No.	Results	Stipulations	Times
1	Los Rayos Tapatío (I and II) defeated Inquisidor and Mortiz	Best two out of three falls Tag team match	10:24
2	Los Guerreros Tuareg (Arkangel de la Muerte, Hooligan and Skándalo) defeated Guerrero Maya, Jr. Astro Boy and Sensei	Six-man tag team match	18:18
3	Eléctrico defeated Pierrothito	Lightning match (One fall, 10 minute time-limit match)	06:00
4	Poder Mexica (Sangre Azteca and Misterioso, Jr.) and Pólvora defeated Los Ángeles Celestiales (Ángel Azteca, Jr., Ángel de Plata and Ángel de Oro)	Six-man tag team match	12:09
5	Místico, Jon Strongman and Toscano defeated Los Hijos del Averno (Averno, Mephisto and Ephesto)	Six-man tag team match	13:48
6	Máscara Dorada, La Máscara and La Sombra defeated La Ola Amarilla (Hiroshi Tanahashi, Okumura and Taichi) (C)	Six-man tag team match for the CMLL World Trios Championship	20:35

== May 28, 2010 ==
CMLL Super Viernes
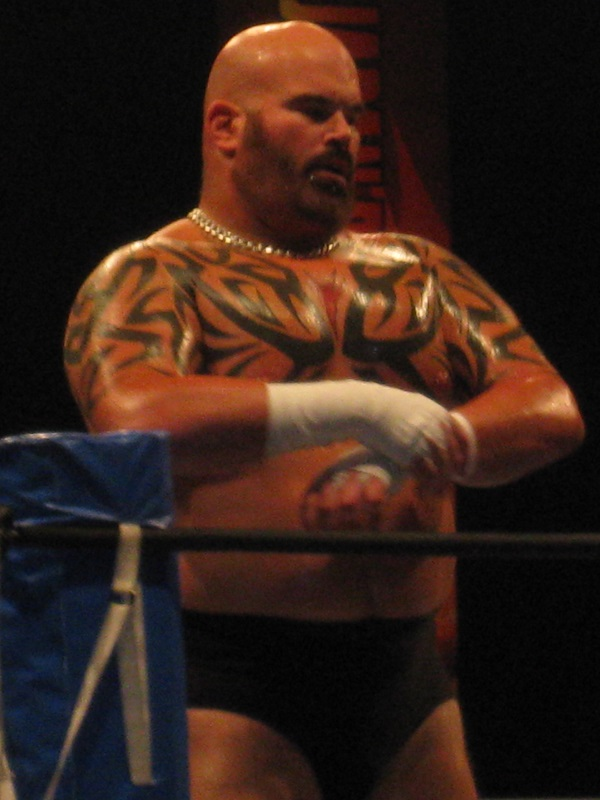
- Giante Bernard making his CMLL debut
- Promotion: Consejo Mundial de Lucha Libre (CMLL)
- Date: May 28, 2010
- City: Mexico City, Mexico
- Venue: Arena México

CMLL Super Viernes chronology
← Previous; Super Viernes May 21, 2010	Next → Super Viernes June 4, 2010

The May 28, 2010 Super Viernes featured the traditional six match format CMLL uses for the majority of their Super Viernes shows, including a Lightning match and a match featured the women's division. The main event of the evening was a Best two out of three falls Six-man tag team match which featured the CMLL debut of Giant Bernard, visiting Mexico on behalf of New Japan Pro-Wrestling (NJPW). Traditionally the NJPW wrestlers are booked as rúdos (bad guys) and often as part of a faction called La Ola Amarilla ("The Yellow Wave"), but Bernard was teamed up with técnicos (good guys) Jon Strongman and Shocker for this show. Prior to the May 28 Super Viernes it had been announced that Giant Bernard would wrestle on CMLL's June 6, 2010 Sin Salida event opposite Strongman, leading people to expect that Giant Bernard would turn on his partners during the Super Viernes main event. Bernard and Los Guapos International (Strongman and Shocker) faced the team of Héctor Garza, El Terrible and El Texano, Jr. with the power and size of both Giant Bernard and Strongman proving to be too much for the opposing team, intimidating them early on with their brute force. During most of the match, both Strongman and Bernard had to chase the rúdo team around the ring. When Shocker was in the ring the rúdo team had a chance, but once Strongman tagged in he and Bernard dominated the first fall, easily pinning their opponents after 7:39 of wrestling. The second fall picked up where the first left off, with Strongman landing a Torture rack slam on Texano, Jr. while Giant Bernard pinned Garza following a Baldo Bomb (A Chokebomb pin), winning the match in just over 10 minutes in two straight falls. During the event Strongman and Bernard cooperated without showing any signs of tension, it was later announced that they would be on opposite teams on the June 4, 2010 Super Viernes without an explanation of why Bernard was booked on the rúdo side a week later.

The driving force behind the semi-main event was the building feud between Máximo and Ola Amarilla representative Taichi towards a Lucha de Apuesta, hair vs. hair match at Sin Salida. Máximo teamed up with Volador Jr. and El Hijo del Fantasma to face off against Taichi and Okumura as well as Ray Mendoza. Jr. who often teams with La Ola Amarilla when they are a man short for Trios matches. Máximo managed to pin Taichi to win the first fall after only 3:40 of wrestling. When the Exótico Máximo tried to kiss Taichi during the second fall the Japanese wrestler was so offended by the gesture that he kicked Máximo in the groin area in full view of the referee, drawing a disqualification for his team and a two falls to none loss.

In the fourth match of the evening 2/3 of the group Poder Mexica (Sangre Azteca and Misterioso, Jr.) teamed up with Cancerberos del Infierno representative Euforia to take on the team of |Blue Panther, Valiente and Ángel de Oro, in a match that had no particular background going into the event except for the fact that Poder Mexica and Pólvora had defeated Los Ángeles Celestiales (Ángel de Oro, Ángel Azteca, Jr. and Ángel de Plata) during the previous week's Super Viernes. the teams split the first two falls between them, leading to a third fall where Blue Panther forced Misterioso, Jr. to submit to a Fujiwara armbar. The third fall came after 16:47 of wrestling, making it the longest match of the night.

The third match of the night was the Lightning match, a one fall match with a 10-minute time limit that featured the veteran Cancerbero wrestling the rookie Rush in what was Rush's first ever Lightning match. The veteran dominates most of the match, punishing Rush with a series of high impact moves, but it is not enough for Cancerbero to gain the pin fall on the rookie. Rush turns the momentum around with a kick to the stomach, followed by a Michinoku Driver that left Cancerberos on the mat long enough for Rush to climb the ropes and execute a Senton splash to gain the victory.

The May 28 Super Viernes featured a six-woman's tag team match as the second match of the evening. Total Nonstop Action Wrestling (TNA) regular Dark Angel (who wrestles as Sarita in TNA) teamed up with Luna Mágica and Lluvia, taking on a team captained by the CMLL World Women's Champion La Amapola, teaming with the Mexican National Women's Champion Princesa Blanca and the Japanese Mima Shimoda. During the first fall Princesa Blanca and La Amapola kicked their opponents out of the ring and prevented them from coming to the aid of Dark Angel as Mima Shimoda pinned for the first fall. In the second fall Luna Magica is able to pin Mima Shimoda while Lluvia forced Princesa Blanca to submit to a Double Nelson hold. The third fall almost ends the same way the first fall did with Dark Angel and Mima Shimoda in the ring while La Amapola and Princesa Blanca were keeping Luna Magica and Lluvia out of the ring. But this time Dark Angel managed to turn the tables on Shimoda and pinned her following a Tiger Driver.

The opening match featured a tag team contest between rúdos Disturbio and Semental and the técnico team of Starman and Metálico. Neither team worked as a regular tag team leading up to the event but were paired up by CMLL for the show. In this instance Starman and Metálico defeated the rúdo team, two falls to one in a match that went just over 12 minutes.

No.	Results	Stipulations	Times
1	Starman and Metálico defeated Disturbio and Semental	Best two out of three falls Tag team match	12:10
2	Dark Angel, Luna Mágica and Lluvia defeated La Amapola, Princesa Blanca and Mima Shimoda	Six-man tag team match	09:50
3	Rush defeated Cancerbero	Lightning match (One fall, 10 minute time-limit match)	08:47
4	Blue Panther, Valiente and Ángel de Oro defeated Poder Mexica (Sangre Azteca and Misterioso Jr.) and Euforia	Six-man tag team match	16:47
5	Volador Jr., El Hijo del Fantasma and Máximo defeated Ray Mendoza Jr., Taichi and Okumura	Six-man tag team match	08:45
6	Giant Bernard, Jon Strongman and Shocker defeated Héctor Garza, El Terrible and El Texano Jr.	Six-man tag team match	10:56
