= Taichi (wrestler) =

Japanese professional wrestler (born 1980)

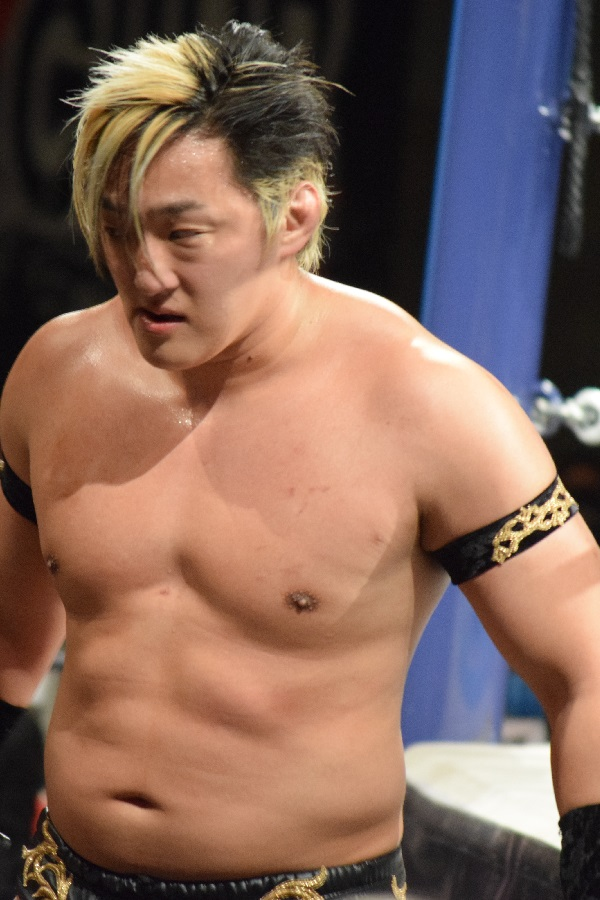
- Taichi in March 2017

Personal information
- Born: Taichiro Maki; March 19, 1980 (age 46) Ishikari, Hokkaido, Japan

Professional wrestling career
- Ring name(s): Hokkaido; Taichi; Taichi Ishikari
- Billed height: 1.77 m (5 ft 10 in)
- Billed weight: 100 kg (220 lb)
- Trained by: Hiroshi Hase; Toshiaki Kawada; All Japan Pro Wrestling
- Debut: December 2, 2002

Taichiro Maki (牧 太一郎, Maki Taichiro) (born March 19, 1980) is a Japanese professional wrestler, better known by his ring name Taichi (タイチ, Taichi), shortened from his previous ring name Taichi Ishikari (石狩太一, Ishikari Taichi). He is signed to New Japan Pro-Wrestling (NJPW), where he is a former two-time NEVER Openweight Champion, a former two-time IWGP Junior Heavyweight Tag Team Champion, former four-time IWGP Tag Team Champions, and a former KOPW Champion.

Taichi was a founding member of the villainous Suzuki-gun stable from 2011 till the faction's disbandment in 2022, and later became a founding member of the Just 5 Guys stable. Throughout his career he has competed in various promotions including All Japan Pro Wrestling (AJPW), Consejo Mundial de Lucha Libre (CMLL), Hustle, Pro Wrestling Noah (Noah) and Total Nonstop Action Wrestling (TNA).

== Amateur wrestling career ==
Wanting to be a pro-wrestler since high school he competed in amateur wrestling while in high school, and was ranked second in the 63 kg class in the 1997 Hokkaido high school championship conference.

== Professional wrestling career ==
=== All Japan Pro Wrestling (2002–2005) ===
In December 2002, Ishikari made his debut for All Japan Pro Wrestling (AJPW). He would pick up his first singles victory over heavyweight prospect Masayuki Kono about six months into his career on May 12, 2003. He got a huge opportunity by representing AJPW in the 4th Stage Super J-Cup hosted by Osaka Pro Wrestling in 2004, but came up short after losing to Osaka Pro ace Takehiro Murahama in the first round. Teaming with Toshiaki Kawada in the Autumn Festival Tag Tournament, he earned both victories in their finals matches to win his first tournament. He was AJPW's first junior heavyweight prospect in a long while, being a very quick and fiery youngster who was coming along well. Ishikari began 2005 by challenging for the World Junior Heavyweight Championship against champion Taka Michinoku in a losing effort, then continued wrestling in the lower mid-card.

=== Total Nonstop Action Wrestling (2004) ===
On May 26, 2004, Taichi Ishikari appeared as a member of Team Japan in Total Nonstop Action Wrestling's 2004 World X Cup, competing in both a battle royal and a ladder match. He was rumored to be a part of 2008's Team Japan, but the spot was filled by Puma.

=== Freelancing and New Japan Pro-Wrestling (2005–2010) ===
In early February 2005 Ishikari followed his mentor, Toshiaki Kawada and ended his affiliation with AJPW to become a freelance wrestler. Ishikari bounced around trying to find a new permanent home, competing for Hustle and the short lived Kings Road promotion. In mid 2006 Ishikari started to appear on New Japan Pro-Wrestling shows and his activity with the company then increased in 2006 and 2007 and finally in 2009 he became an official member of the NJPW roster. In April, he changed his ring name to the mononym Taichi. He would find himself a tag team partner in Milano Collection A.T. and together, as Unione, they would challenge for the IWGP Junior Heavyweight Tag Team Championship held by Prince Devitt and Ryusuke Taguchi but were unable to win the title.

=== Consejo Mundial de Lucha Libre (2010) ===
After Milano Collection A.T. announced his retirement in January 2010, New Japan announced that Taichi would be leaving for Mexican promotion Consejo Mundial de Lucha Libre (CMLL) to seek a new direction in his career. The plan was for him to remain with CMLL for at least five months. Taichi made his CMLL debut on February 19, 2010, in Arena México, Mexico City where he teamed up with Naito and Ray Mendoza, Jr. to defeat Strong Man, Mr. Niebla and Máximo in two straight falls. On May 7, 2010 Taichi and Okumura teamed up with former IWGP Heavyweight Champion Hiroshi Tanahashi to defeat El Hijo del Fantasma, La Máscara and Héctor Garza to win the CMLL World Trios Championship in the main event of the weekly Friday night Super Viernes show. La Ola Amarilla's reign as Trios champions only lasted two weeks as they were defeated by La Máscara, La Sombra and Máscara Dorada on May 21, 2010. Through the trios matches Taichi has developed a rivalry with La Máscara who challenged Taichi to a Lucha de Apuesta match where Taichi would put his hair on the line against La Máscara's mask. Taichi later announced that he accepted the challenge, making it the main event of CMLL's 2010 Sin Salida show. On June 6, 2010 Máximo defeated Taichi two falls to one and had his hair shaved off after the match. Afterwards Taichi returned to New Japan, before returning to CMLL for a two-month stint in early October 2010.

=== Return to NJPW (2010–present) ===
==== Junior Heavyweight Division (2010–2016) ====
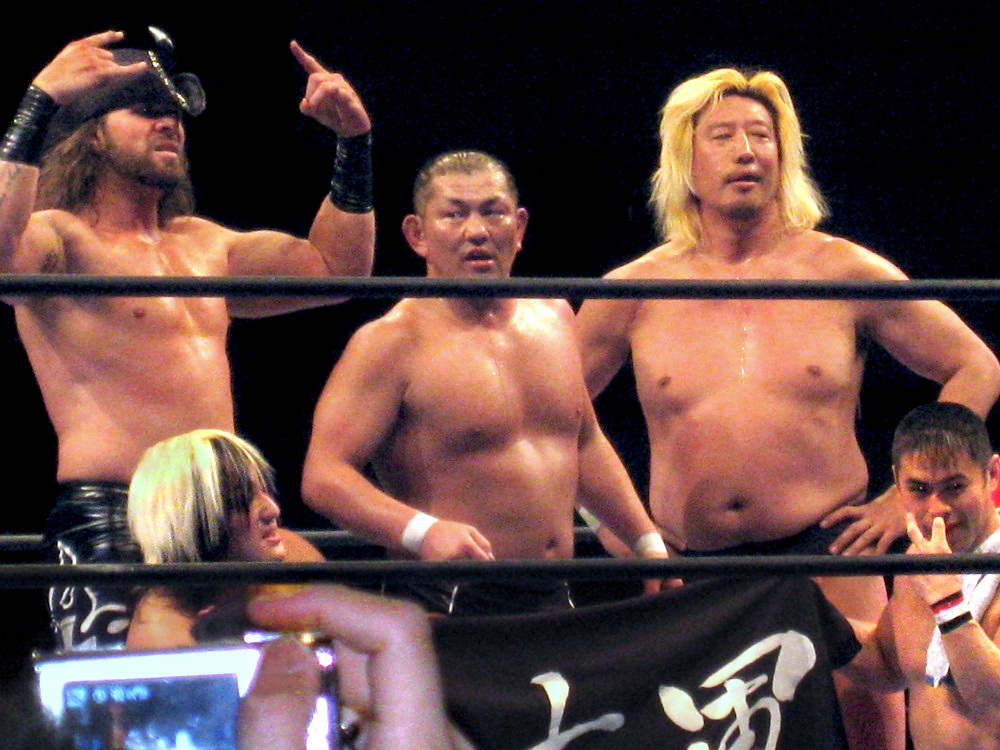
Taichi with Suzuki-gun in February 2012

On December 11, 2010, Taichi returned from his latest stint in CMLL and aligned himself with IWGP Heavyweight Champion Satoshi Kojima as part of Kojima-gun, which would later also come to include MVP, Nosawa Rongai and Taka Michinoku. On April 8, 2011, Taichi defeated Madoka in the finals of a two-day tournament to earn a spot in the 2011 Best of the Super Juniors tournament. On May 3, Taichi and Taka Michinoku turned on Kojima and revealed the returning Minoru Suzuki as their new leader. After losing his first six-round robin stage matches in the 2011 Best of the Super Juniors, Taichi came back to win his last two matches and finish eighth out of the nine wrestlers in his block. Since then, Taichi has formed a regular partnership with Taka Michinoku, with the two unsuccessfully challenging Prince Devitt and Ryusuke Taguchi for the IWGP Junior Heavyweight Tag Team Championship on September 11, 2011. On June 16, 2012, at Dominion 6.16, Taichi and Michinoku received another opportunity to wrestle for the IWGP Junior Heavyweight Tag Team Championship but were defeated by Jyushin Thunder Liger and Tiger Mask, after Taichi unmasked Liger and unintentionally turned him into "Kishin Liger", a more violent version of himself. In August, Taichi began blaming Michinoku for his recent losses, which led to the two agreeing to a match, where the loser would be expelled from Suzuki-gun. The match took place on August 22 at Michinoku's Kaientai Dojo promotion, but ended without a winner as Minoru Suzuki interrupted the match and got the two men to make peace with each other. On September 5, Taichi returned to Mexico for another tour with CMLL and instantly turned down an offer to rejoin La Ola Amarilla, pledging his loyalty to Minoru Suzuki and Suzuki-gun. In his first match back in CMLL on September 7, Taichi teamed with Hiroshi Tanahashi, Namajague and Okumura in a Japan vs. Mexico torneo cibernetico, where they faced Black Warrior, La Máscara, Negro Casas and Valiente. After being eliminated by La Máscara, Taichi interfered in the match and helped Tanahashi pick up the win for the Japanese. Taichi returned to Japan on October 14.

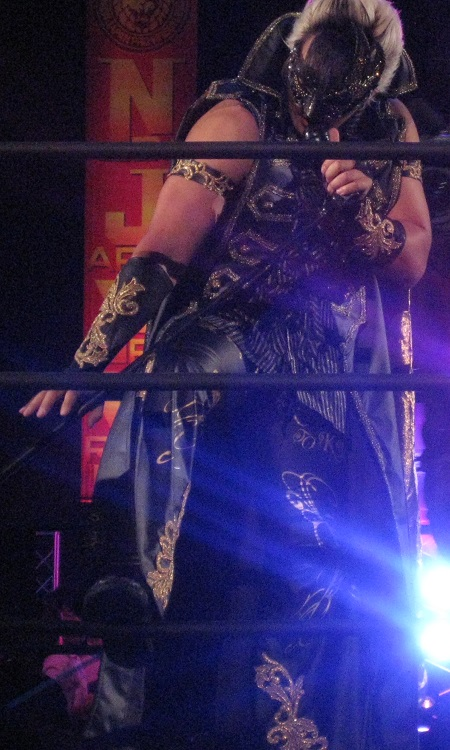
Taichi in September 2014

In January 2013, Taichi was sidelined with a knee injury, suffered in a traffic accident. When he returned in April, he was wearing a knee brace, which he began using as an offensive weapon behind the referees' backs, dubbing his new knee strike finisher, "Jage Koroshi". On May 24, Taichi entered the 2013 Best of the Super Juniors tournament, where he got off to a flying start, winning his first four matches, albeit through cheating, including interference from Taka Michinoku and locking Jyushin Thunder Liger out of the building for a countout victory. His win streak ended in his fifth match on June 1, when he was defeated by CMLL representative Titán. Taichi also ended up losing his three remaining matches in the tournament, narrowly missing advancement to the semifinals. On July 20, Taichi and Michinoku received another shot at the IWGP Junior Heavyweight Tag Team Championship but were defeated by the defending champions, the Forever Hooligans (Alex Koslov and Rocky Romero). On July 26, Taichi began another tour with Mexican promotion CMLL, once again reigniting his rivalry with Máximo. Back in New Japan on September 29 at Destruction, Taichi and Michinoku failed to earn another shot at the IWGP Junior Heavyweight Tag Team Championship, when they were defeated in a number one contender's match by Time Splitters (Alex Shelley and Kushida). However, when Shelley was sidelined with an injury, Taichi and Michinoku were given the title shot and, on October 14 at King of Pro-Wrestling, defeated the Forever Hooligans to win the IWGP Junior Heavyweight Tag Team Championship, Taichi's first title in New Japan. Taichi and Michinoku made their first successful title defense on November 1, defeating Gedo and Jado at their self-produced independent event. After a reign of only 26 days, Taichi and Michinoku lost the title to The Young Bucks (Matt Jackson and Nick Jackson) on November 9 at Power Struggle.

In May 2014 Taichi did well in the 2014 Best of the Super Juniors tournament, finishing with a record of four wins and three losses. Despite finishing tied with the leader and runner-up of the block, Taichi failed to advance to the semifinals due to head-to-head match results. Taichi was, however, later granted entry into the semifinals, after the block's winner, Alex Shelley, was forced to pull out of the tournament due to a shoulder injury. On June 8, Taichi was eliminated from the tournament in the semifinals by Kushida. The following day, New Japan suspended Maki for two months with a 30% pay cut after photos of him having an extramarital affair started circulating, implying he cheated on his wife. Taichi returned from his suspension on August 10 and wrestled his return match on September 5, forming a new tag team with Suzuki-gun's newest member, El Desperado. At that time, Taichi would take up a mic and would sing his way to the ring. Taichi and El Desperado received a shot at the IWGP Junior Heavyweight Tag Team Championship on September 23 at Destruction in Okayama but were defeated by the Time Splitters. On November 8 at Power Struggle, Taichi received a shot at the IWGP Junior Heavyweight Championship, but was defeated by Ryusuke Taguchi.

==== Heavyweight Division (2018–present) ====
On March 6, Taichi and Yoshinobu Kanemaru defeated Roppongi Vice to become the new IWGP Junior Heavyweight Tag Team Champions. They lost the title back to Roppongi Vice in their second defense on April 27. The following month, Taichi took part in the 2017 Best of the Super Juniors, where he finished with a record of four wins and three losses, failing to advance to the finals. On January 23, 2018 at TakaTaichiMania, Taichi announced he was moving up to New Japan's heavyweight division. On March 6, 2018 NJPW's 46th anniversary show, Taichi made his heavyweight debut against Tetsuya Naito, where Naito was victorious On March 10, Taichi made his New Japan Cup debut against Hiroshi Tanahashi in the first round, but was defeated by Tanahashi, failing to advance. On April 27, Taichi would start a feud with NEVER Openweight Champion Hirooki Goto, and would repeatedly demand to face Goto for the NEVER Openweight Championship in a singles match. Taichi received his shot in a three-way match for the NEVER Openweight Championship which took place at Dominion 6.9 in Osaka-Jo Hall, where Taichi faced Goto and Michael Elgin, who had also challenged for the title, but was unsuccessful after being pinned by Elgin. At the final day of G1 Climax 28, a returning Taichi (who was not a participant in the tournament) issued a challenge to the NEVER Openweight Champion Hirooki Goto for a singles rematch for the title, which Goto accepted. The match took place on September 17 at Destruction in Beppu, where Taichi defeated Goto to become the new NEVER Openweight champion. On November 3 at Power Struggle, Taichi lost the NEVER Openweight championship back to Goto in a rematch, ending his reign at 47 days From November 17 to December 9, Taichi teamed with fellow Suzuki-Gun member Zack Sabre Jr for the 2018 World Tag League, his first entry into the tournament. The duo finished with 8 wins and 5 losses, failing to secure a spot in the finals.

On January 5, 2019 at New Years Dash, Taichi pinned the IWGP Intercontinental Champion Tetsuya Naito in a ten-man tag team match between Suzuki-gun and Los Ingobernables de Japón, and challenging Naito for the title immediately afterward. The match was set at New Beginning in Sapporo on February 2, where Taichi was unsuccessful in capturing the title. In March, Taichi entered the 2019 edition of the New Japan Cup, defeating Tomoaki Honma in the first round before being eliminated in the second by Tomohiro Ishii. On May 3 at Wrestling Dontaku, Taichi defeated Jeff Cobb to win the NEVER Openweight Championship for the second time. The following night on May 4, Taichi would nominate Tomohiro Ishii as the next challenger for his title, with the match taking place on June 9 at Dominion. Ishii would win the match, ending Taichi's second reign as champion. Taichi would then make his G1 debut in the 2019 G1 Climax B block, where he finished with a record of eight points (four wins and five losses), notably defeating Tomohiro Ishii clean on the last night of block action. Following the G1, Taichi would enter a brief feud with Tetsuya Naito; him and DOUKI would lose to the team of Naito and Shingo Takagi at King of Pro-Wrestling (2019) via disqualification, and Naito defeated Taichi in a singles match at Power Struggle. In the 2019 World Tag League, Taichi would once again team with Zack Sabre Jr. (unofficially dubbing themselves 'Dangerous Tekkers' and 'Godspeed You! Zack Emperor') and the duo ended the tournament with 18 points after 9 wins and 6 losses.

In December, it was announced that Taichi would be competing at Wrestle Kingdom 14. On January 4, he and other members of Suzuki-gun (Minoru Suzuki, Zack Sabre Jr., and El Desperado) defeated Los Ingobernables de Japón (EVIL, SANADA, Shingo Takagi, and BUSHI) in an eight-man tag team match. On January 5, he unsuccessfully teamed with Desperado and Yoshinobu Kanemaru in a pre-show Gauntlet match for the NEVER Openweight 6-Man Tag Team Championship. On July 12, at Dominion, Taichi and Sabre defeated Tanahashi and Ibushi to win their IWGP Tag Team Championships. They lost the belts to Guerrillas of Destiny at Wrestle Kingdom 15 but regained them on June 1 at Road to Dominion. They would once again lose the belts to World Tag League winners Hirooki Goto and YOSHI-HASHI at Wrestle Kingdom 16.

In March, Taichi entered the New Japan Cup, defeating Toru Yano in the first round. Taichi received a bye to the third round, after Hiroyoshi Tenzan forfeited after suffering a knee injury. In the third round, Taichi was defeated by Kazuchika Okada. The following month, Taichi entered a feud with Toru Yano over the KOPW trophy, which led to a match at Hyper Battle. At the event, Taichi defeated Yano in a No-rope ring-out match to become the provisional KOPW Champion. Taichi lost the championship to Shingo Takagi during the NJPW Golden Fight Series, in a 30-count match. Taichi lost the rematch to Takagi at Dominion 6.12 in Osaka-jo Hall, in a 10 Minute Unlimited Pinfall Scramble match. Also at Dominion, Taichi was announced to be participating in the G1 Climax 32 tournament in June, as a part of the B Block. He finished his campaign with 4 points, failing to advance to the semifinals. In October, Taichi competed in a tournament to crown the inaugural NJPW World Television Champion, but was defeated and eliminated by Sanada in the first round. In December, at JTO 50th Anniversary For TAKATaichi Together ~ Last TAKATaichi, Taichi failed to recapture the KOPW Championship from Shingo Takagi. Later in the month, at the World Tag League & Best of the Super Juniors finals, Minoru Suzuki announced the disbandment of Suzuki-gun by the end of the year. The final match between the faction took place on December 23, where the team of Taichi, Sabre Jr, Kanemaru and Douki defeated Suzuki, Archer, Desperado and Michinoku. After the match, each of the Suzuki-gun members spoke about their memories as a part of the group and thanked leader Suzuki. The night ended with all members posing with the Suzuki-gun flag, only to be interrupted by former member Takashi Iizuka, causing all 9 men to pose in the ring, behind the Suzuki-gun flag.

Taichi started 2023, by competing in the New Japan Rambo, match on January 4 at Wrestle Kingdom 17, but failed to last till the final 4. The following day at New Year Dash, Taichi reunited with former Suzuki-gun stablemates, Yoshinobu Kanmaru, Taka Michinoku and Douki, forming anew stable called Just 4 Guys. At the event, the trio defeated United Empire (Francesco Akira, TJP and Will Ospreay). In March, Taichi competed in the New Japan Cup. In the first round, Taichi competed against Sanada, who was on a losing streak. Sanada defeated Taichi, eliminating him from the tournament and ending Sanada's losing streak. During the match, the two men showed each other respect despite being from different factions. On March 17, Sanada defeated LIJ leader and stablemate Tetsuya Naito to advance to the next round. After the match, Just 4 Guys members (Taichi, Michinoku, Douki and Kanemaru) entered the ring, congratulating Sanada, causing the remainder of LIJ to come to ringside. Sanada then announced that there was nothing else for him to do in LIJ and that he would join Just 4 Guys instead. Sanada then told Naito and the rest of LIJ to leave, confirming himself as the newest member of Just 4 Guys, thus making the group Just 5 Guys. On March 21, Sanada won the New Japan Cup, causing Taichi and the remainder of Just 5 Guys to celebrate with him in the ring.

Sanada's departure from LIJ started a feud between the latter and Just 5 Guys, causing Taichi to begin a feud with the reigning Provisional KOPW Champion, Shingo Takagi. On April 29 at NJPW Wrestling Satsuma no Kuni, Taichi defeated Takagi, to become the new Provisional KOPW Champion. In July, Taichi entered the 2023 G1 Climax, where he'd compete in the B Block. Taichi finished the tournament with 6 points, failing to advance to the quarterfinal round. Following the tournament, on August 13, Just 5 Guys embarked on a feud with House of Torture. After a match between the two sides, Taichi was attacked by Sho with the provisional KOPW Championship, declaring that he would take it from its rightful holder, after he was pinned by him in an eight-man tag team match, setting up a title match at Destruction. At the event, Taichi lost the title to Sho, in a seconds handcuffed match, after Yoshinobu Kanemaru turned on him and Just 5 Guys and joined House of Torture.

On November 4, 2024 at Power Struggle, Taichi failed to defeat David Finlay for the IWGP Global Heavyweight Championship after Sanada betrayed Just 5 Guys to join the Bullet Club War Dogs, reverting the group back to Just 4 Guys.

On June 15, 2025 at Dominion 6.15 in Osaka-jo Hall, Taichi and Tomohiro Ishii defeated then reigning champions Great-O-Khan and Callum Newman of the United Empire to win the IWGP Tag Team Championship. In the same event, it was announced that Just 4 Guys would be disbanded and merging with the main Hontai unit of NJPW. At Destruction in Kobe, Ishii and Taichi lost their titles to Knock Out Brothers (Yuto-Ice and Oskar), ending their reign at 105 days.

=== Pro-Wrestling NOAH (2015—2016) ===
In January 2015, Suzuki-gun entered a storyline, where the entire stable invaded the Pro Wrestling Noah promotion. As part of the storyline, Taichi won the GHC Junior Heavyweight Championship on March 15 by defeating Atsushi Kotoge. Taichi held the title for the rest of the year, successfully defending it four times, before losing it to Taiji Ishimori on December 23. On June 24, 2016, at a show produced by Taichi and Taka Michinoku, Taichi was one of two winners of a four-man round-robin tournament to earn a spot in the 2016 Super J-Cup. On July 20, Taichi returned to NJPW to take part in the Super J-Cup, defeating AJPW's Yuma Aoyagi in his first round match. On August 21, Taichi defeated Jyushin Thunder Liger in the second round of the tournament, before being eliminated in the semifinals by reigning IWGP Junior Heavyweight Champion Kushida. Suzuki-gun's Noah invasion storyline concluded in December 2016, which led to the stable returning to NJPW on January 5, 2017.

== Personal life ==
Maki married Ryoko Iwafune (岩船涼子, Iwafune Ryoko March 18, 1985) better known as Ofune in 2004 they have two daughters. Maki cheated on Ofune in 2011 and on May 28, 2014 Maki's mistress Shijimi posted their pictures. Their relationship ended in 2014 after three years of dating. Ofune took the full custody of their eldest daughter and Pi Maki. Since they split up, Maki remained single. Their eldest daughter was born in 2005 and their youngest daughter's name is Pi Maki and was born in 2009. He is an avid fan of sumo. Maki's two daughters has one maternal half-brother named Boya who is from Ofune's second marriage. Maki's ex-wife Ofune is fluent in English and teaches the English language for toddlers.

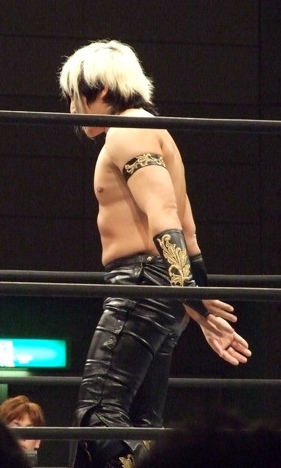
Taichi in June 2011

== Championships and accomplishments ==
- All Japan Pro Wrestling
  - Autumn Festival Tag Tournament (2004) – with Toshiaki Kawada
- Consejo Mundial de Lucha Libre
  - CMLL World Trios Championship (1 time) – with Hiroshi Tanahashi and Okumura
- New Japan Pro-Wrestling
  - IWGP Tag Team Championship (4 times) – with Zack Sabre Jr. (3) and Tomohiro Ishii (1)
  - IWGP Junior Heavyweight Tag Team Championship (2 times) – with Taka Michinoku (1) and Yoshinobu Kanemaru (1)
  - NEVER Openweight Championship (2 times)
  - Road to the Super Jr. 2days Tournament (2011)
  - KOPW Championship (1 time)
  - KOPW Provisional Championship (2 times)
- Pro Wrestling Illustrated
  - Ranked No. 89 of the top 500 singles wrestlers in the PWI 500 in 2019
  - Ranked No. 3 of the top 50 Tag Teams in the PWI Tag Team 50 in 2021 - with Zack Sabre Jr.
- Pro Wrestling Noah
  - GHC Junior Heavyweight Championship (1 time)
- Taka & Taichi Box Office
  - Super J-Cup Qualifying League (2016)
- Tokyo Sports
  - Best Tag Team Award (2021) with Zack Sabre Jr.

== Luchas de Apuestas record ==
Winner (wager)	Loser (wager)	Location	Event	Date	Notes
Máximo (hair)	Taichi (hair)	Mexico City	Sin Salida	June 6, 2010	
