= Sin Salida (2010) =

Mexican professional wrestling supercard show

- Official poster of the event showing a number of CMLL and NJPW wrestlers
- Promotion: Consejo Mundial de Lucha Libre
- Date: June 6, 2010
- City: Mexico City, Mexico
- Venue: Arena México

Pay-per-view chronology
← Previous; 54. Aniversario de Arena México	Next → Promociones Gutiérrez 1st Anniversary Show

Sin Salida chronology
← Previous; 2009	Next → 2013

Sin Salida ("Spanish for "No Exit") was a professional wrestling major event produced by Consejo Mundial de Lucha Libre (CMLL) that took place on June 6, 2010, in Arena México, Mexico City, Mexico. The event was centered on the storyline between CMLL wrestlers and a group called Los Invasores, a group portraying an "invading force". The event featured six matches, where four of the six matches featured the Invasores group of wrestlers. CMLL usually hold their major events on Friday Nights, but in this case CMLL chose to hold the event on Sunday, running opposite their rival Asistencia Asesoría y Administración's Triplemanía XVIII event that took place on the same night in Mexico City. The main event was scheduled to be a Lucha de Apuestas, hair vs. hair match between Taichi vs. Máximo.

== Production ==
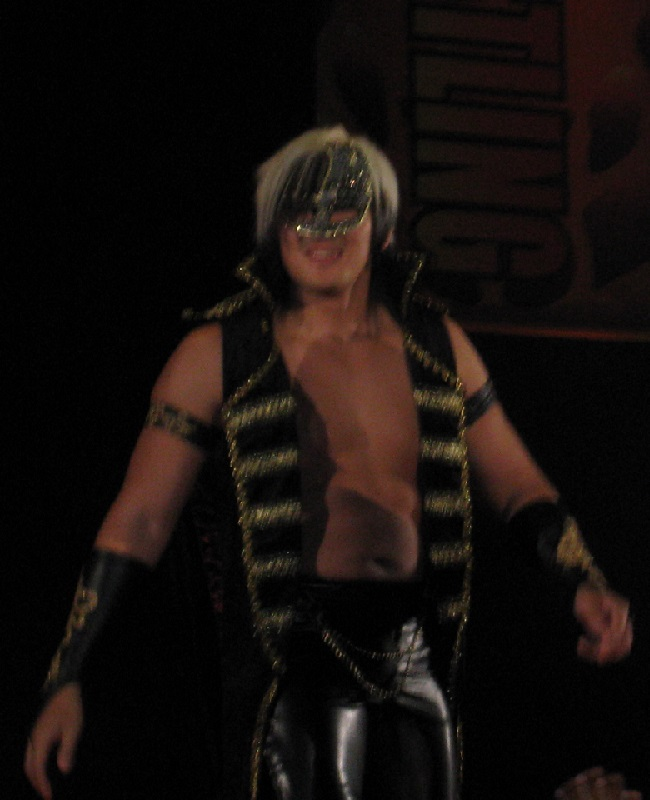
Taichi, featured in the main event

=== Background ===
The Mexican wrestling company Consejo Mundial de Lucha Libre (Spanish for "World Wrestling Council"; CMLL) has held a number of major shows over the years using the moniker Sin Salida ("No Ext" or "No Escape"). CMLL has intermittently held a show billed specifically as Sin Salida since 2009, primarily using the name for their "end of the year" show in December, although once they held a Sin Piedad show in August as well. All Sin Salida shows have been held in Arena México in Mexico City, Mexico which is CMLL's main venue, its "home". Traditionally CMLL holds their major events on Friday Nights, which means the Sin Salida shows replace their regularly scheduled Super Viernes show. The 2010 Sin Salida show was the second show to use the name.

=== Storylines ===
The event featured six professional wrestling matches with different wrestlers involved in pre-existing scripted feuds, plots and storylines. Wrestlers were portrayed as either heels (referred to as rudos in Mexico, those that portray the "bad guys") or faces (técnicos in Mexico, the "good guy" characters) as they followed a series of tension-building events, which culminated in a wrestling match or series of matches.

On April 12, 2010, a contingent of former AAA wrestlers including Psicosis II, Histeria, Maniaco, El Alebrije and Cuije appeared on a CMLL show in Puebla, Puebla. The group drown into the arena in a black SUV and attacked La Sombra, El Hijo del Fantasma and La Máscara after they just finished wrestling. Brazo de Plata, Místico and Jon Strongman tried to help out but were kept away by CMLL rudos Averno, El Texano Jr. and El Terrible. Following the attack the former AAA wrestlers returned to the SUV and left the arena. The group made several subsequent attacks during CMLL shows, and were soon after introduced as Los Independientes after the "Independent circuit". Over the subsequent weeks the Los Independientes group was renamed Los Invasores and expanded with Universo 2000, Máscara Año 2000, Mr. Águila and Olímpico. CMLLL mainstay Héctor Garza turned on his teammates and joined Los Invasores. On May 20, 2010, CMLL held a press conference to announce the Sin Salida event and also announced that Héctor Garza and Mr. Águila were the co-leaders of the group. During the press conference CMLL also announced that they would be holding Sin Salida (Spanish for "No Exit") event on June 6, 2010, and that it would center on the CMLL vs. Invasores storyline as four of the five matches featured Invasores wrestlers.

CMLL later added one final match as the main event of Sin Salida, a Lucha de Apuestas, hair vs. hair match between Taichi and Máximo to the show. The match came about as a result of a confrontation between the two during a CMLL show the previous week. At the May 28, 2010 Super Viernes Taichi teamed up with Okumura and Ray Mendoza. Jr. to take on Máximo, Volador Jr. and El Hijo del Fantasma. In the second fall Máximo tried to kiss Taichi during the match which caused Taichi to respond by kicking Máximo in the groin area in full view of the referee, drawing a disqualification loss for his team, building on the storyline that Máximo's Exotico ring character bothers Taichi.

== Results ==
No.	Results	Stipulations	Times
1	Demus 3:16 and Pierrothito defeated Bam Bam and Shockercito – two falls to none	Best two-out-of-three falls tag team match	09:05
2	Metro, Rush and Stuka Jr. defeated Los Invasores (Histeria, Maniaco and Monsther) – two falls to one	Best two-out-of-three falls six-man "Lucha Libre rules" tag team match	18:19
3	Shocker, El Hijo del Fantasma and La Máscara defeated Los Invasores (Psicosis, Olímpico and El Alebrije) by disqualification	Best two-out-of-three falls six-man "Lucha Libre rules" tag team match	17:36
4	Místico, Mr. Águila and Máscara Dorada defeated Volador Jr., Averno and Negro Casas by disqualification	Relevos Increibles, best two-out-of-three falls six-man "Lucha Libre rules" tag team match	19:40
5	Los Invasores (Máscara Año 2000 and Universo 2000) and Giant Bernard defeated Rayo de Jalisco Jr., Jon Strongman and Brazo de Plata	Best two-out-of-three falls six-man "Lucha Libre rules" tag team match	18:32
6	Máximo defeated Taichi – two falls to one	Lucha de Apuestas, hair vs. hair match	18:41
