= Moonsault =

Professional wrestling move

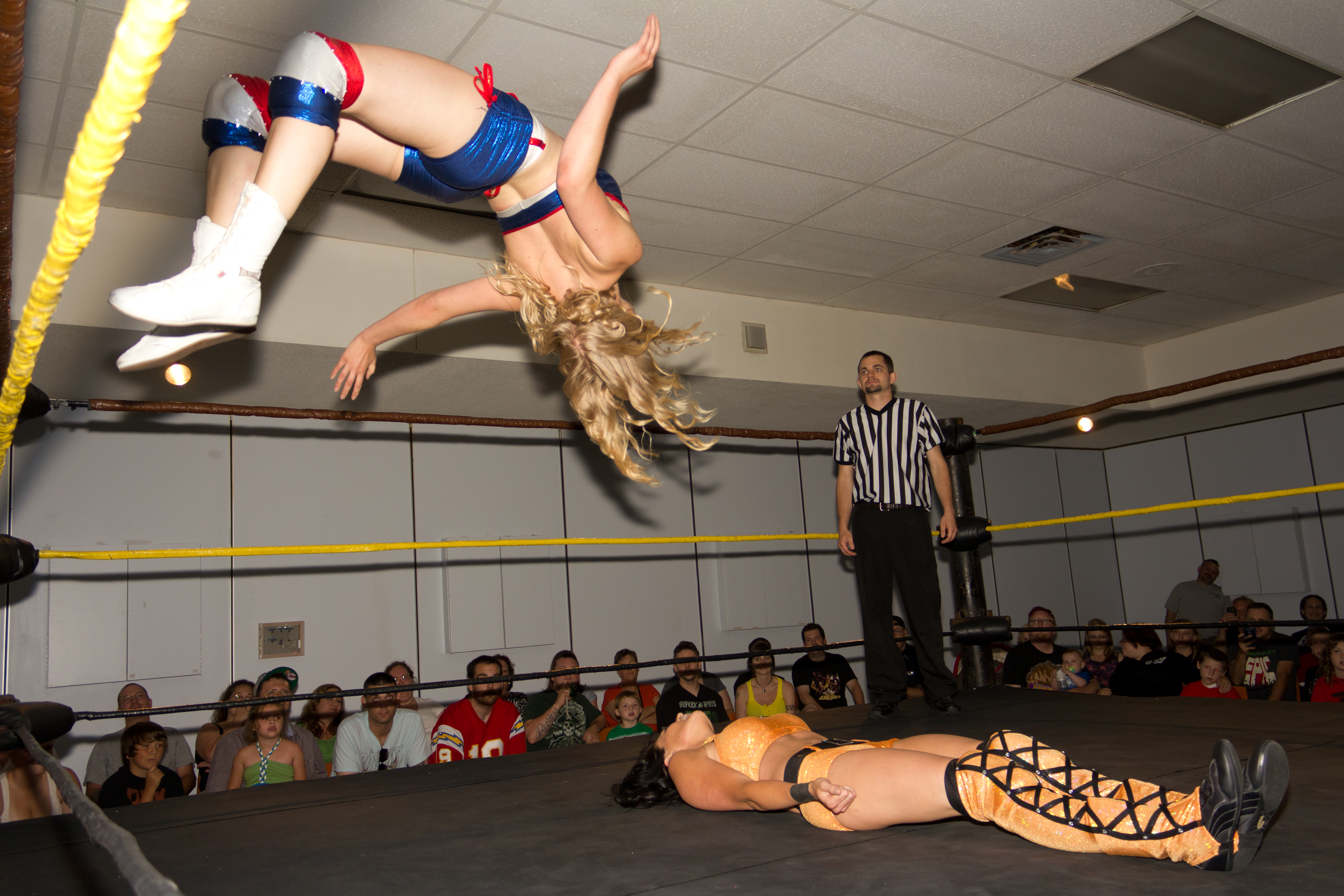
Leah Von Dutch performs a moonsault onto Ianna Titus

A moonsault, moonsault press, or back flip splash is a professional wrestling aerial technique. It was innovated by Mando Guerrero. Much of its popularity in both Japanese and American wrestling is attributed to Keiji Muto, also known as the Great Muta. In a standard moonsault, which is generally attempted from the top rope, a wrestler faces away from the supine opponent and executes a backflip landing on the opponent in a splash/press position but facing towards the elevated position. Though this move is generally attempted from the top rope to an opponent lying face up in the mat, myriad variations exist, including moonsaults that see the wrestler land on a standing opponent and forcing them down to the mat. The move is considered a higher-impact version of a splash, since the wrestler utilizes rotational speed.

A less common variation sees the wrestler perform a moonsault on a standing opponent, with the torso of the wrestler striking the torso of the opponent (albeit upside down), forcing the opponent backwards and to the ground with the opponent on top of them, usually placing the opponent in a pinning predicament. Most of the variations listed below can also be performed on standing opponents.

== Danger and precautions ==
When executed properly the moonsault is generally considered safe, but as with any aerial maneuver, there is inherent high risk when not executed properly. The wrestler performing the move often misses and lands on their stomach unharmed (such as Keiji Mutoh during Starrcade (1989), when he went for a Moonsault on Sting, but ended up missing; he was eventually able to land on his feet and land a kick). Mutoh underwent double knee replacement surgery on February 18, 2018, and has since then not performed the Moonsault. In an interview with Tokyo Sports, Mutoh told them that he was lucky to be alive after botching a moonsault.

In an example of a moonsault gone spectacularly wrong, Eiji Ezaki, better known as Hayabusa, suffered a life-threatening injury on October 22, 2001, while working for the Japanese wrestling promotion Frontier Martial-Arts Wrestling. As Hayabusa began executing a springboard moonsault from the second rope, his feet slipped off the rope and struck the first rope below. As a result Hayabusa did not have enough height within which to execute the full 360° of the move, causing him to land head first and on his neck. He broke two vertebrae and was left quadriplegic, completely ending his career. Hayabusa was eventually able to gain some movement in his lower body, but was never able to wrestle again.

== Variations ==
=== Corkscrew moonsault ===
The corkscrew moonsault is a twisting moonsault in which the wrestler is standing or on an elevated platform, such as the top rope, or the corner of the ring, and performs a moonsault with a 360° twist or multiple twists, landing as if performing a normal moonsault. It was innovated by Chaparita ASARI as a (possibly accidental) variation of her Sky Twister Press senton, and popularized as the tornillo by Hector Garza. Also used by KUSHIDA early in his career as the Midnight Express, Tetsuya Naito previously as the Stardust Press, and Stephanie Vaquer once she reached WWE.

=== Diving moonsault ===
This is a Moonsault from the top rope, a wrestler faces away from the supine opponent and executes a Diving backflip landing on the opponent in a splash position but facing towards the elevated position. In this moonsault, the wrestler land on a standing opponent and forcing them down to the mat. The move is considered a higher-impact version of a splash, since the wrestler utilizes rotational speed.

=== Double jump moonsault ===
This is a variation of a springboard moonsault. This variation sees the wrestler bounce off the middle rope to elevate themself to the top rope, from where they bounce off to perform the moonsault. This version of a moonsault is often referred to as a picture perfect moonsault or double springboard moonsault. It was used by Christopher Daniels, who called the move the BME (Best Moonsault Ever), and Jacob Fatu, who called it the Mighty Moonsault.

=== Double rotation moonsault ===
This is a moonsault where another rotation is performed after the initial moonsault. There are two major variants of the double moonsault, an Asai moonsault version and a normal moonsault from the top turnbuckle to the inside of the ring with two rotations. The first rotation is an arc of the back

The first variation sees a wrestler who is standing on the apron, with a wrestler on the floor behind them, jump up on to either the first or second rope and perform and backflip as in to perform an Asai moonsault but while in mid air tucks their legs reducing resistance and performs a second complete backflip after the first one, landing on a standing opponent below. This is the more common of the two variants due to the increased airtime of the springboard and height from the springboard to the floor. This variant is closely associated with Jack Evans who popularized it as the Stuntin' 101. Evans is also known to perform a corkscrew version of this variant.

The second variation sees a wrestler ascend to the top rope and perform a backflip while tucking their legs. This allows the wrestler to have less resistance and continue to rotate after the initial first 360° for another 270° completing the second rotation onto an opponent lying on the mat. This was popularized by Ricochet.

=== Triple jump moonsault ===
This is a variation of the double jump moonsault where, from a running start, the attacking wrestler jumps to a chair or other elevated platform, onto the top rope, and then does a moonsault from there onto the opponent. This move has been popularized by wrestler Sabu. Tiffany Stratton uses a variation of the move where she uses the ropes for each jump, called the Prettiest Moonsault Ever (inspired by the Christopher Daniels move, the ‘’Best Moonsault Ever’’. This variation utilizes a standing start instead of the running start.

=== Moonsault side slam ===
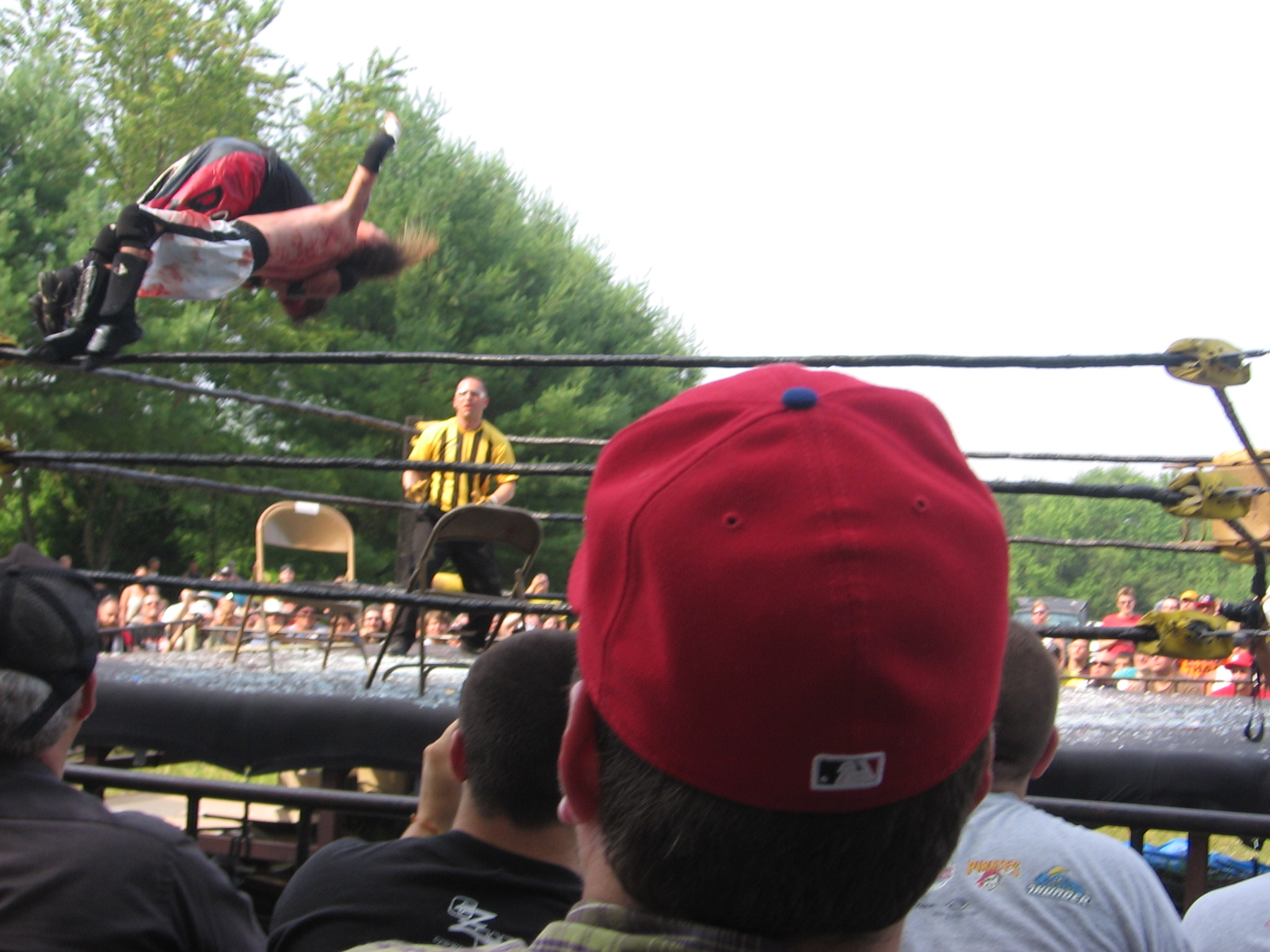
Scotty Vortekz performing a Spanish Fly on Dysfunction.

Invented by Naomichi Marufuji and called Shiranui Kai. Any move where the wrestler stands on an elevated position, grabs hold of the opponent, and performs a moonsault while still holding on to the opponent, driving them down to the mat. This move is also known as a Solo Spanish Fly. Multiple variations exist, such as a belly-to-belly version used by Matt Sydal. This version which sees him holding the opponent in a belly-to-belly position while performing the moonsault to land on top of them in a seated senton. He calls this version the Sydal Special., a side slam version or a rolling version, which can also be performed while standing, John Morrison used the standing version as the C4, while Frankie Kazarian use the rolling version as the Flux Capacitor.

=== Rounding moonsault ===
This variation is also referred to as a sideways moonsault, rolling moonsault, rounding splash, and Original-style moonsault. The attacker climbs the top rope, or other elevated position facing away the opponent. Instead of doing a backflip as in a normal moonsault, the attacker rotates their body off to one side diagonally and lands on the opponent chest-first, facing the turnbuckle as in a normal moonsault. Innovated by Tiger Mask I and used by Bam Bam Bigelow as the Bam Bam-Sault and Vader as the Vadersault respectively.

Another variation of this move sees the attacker facing the prone opponent with the attacker leaping forward into the air rotating their body in a semi-circle to end up-side down as if doing a midair cartwheel then landing on the opponent chest first facing the turnbuckle. Shane McMahon used this move in a 1999 singles match against Test. Alexa Bliss uses this move as her finisher, which she calls Twisted Bliss. Dana Brooke uses this move as a variation while running to an opponent lying on the mat, they rotate in opposite directions.

=== Split-legged moonsault ===
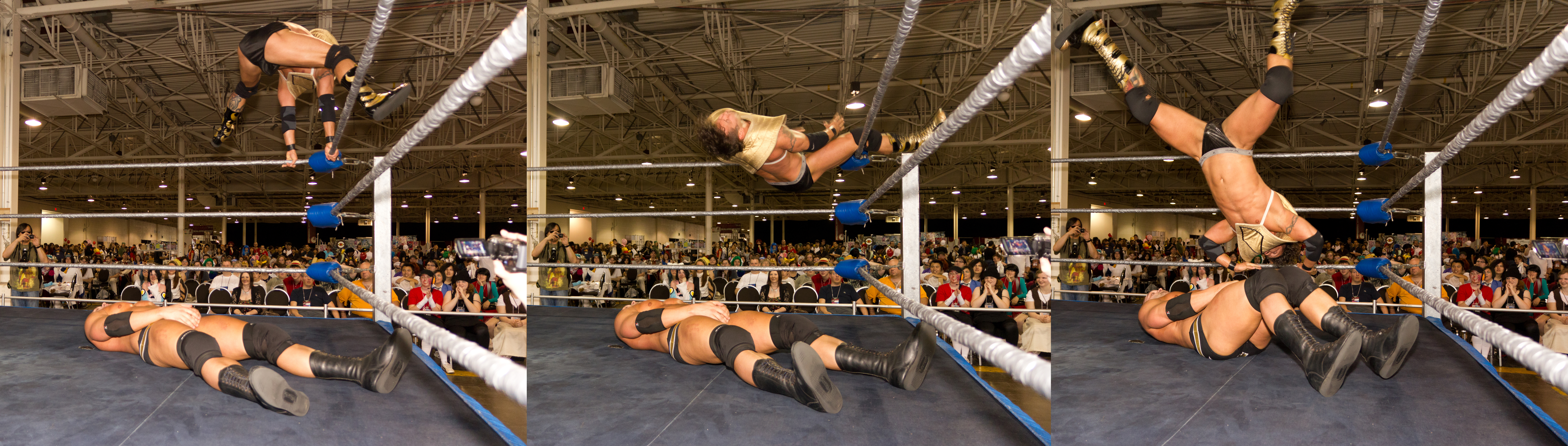
SeXXXy Eddy performing a split-legged moonsault

This moonsault variation sees the performer jump up and split their legs onto both the left and right top ropes surrounding the top turnbuckle, using the impact of their thighs on the rope to flip themselves over, executing a moonsault onto a prone opponent. Rey Mysterio and Naomi uses this move. Also known for being used by CM Punk as the Crooked Moonsault earlier in his career and currently Rob Van Dam as the Hollywood Star Press.

==== Split-legged corkscrew moonsault ====
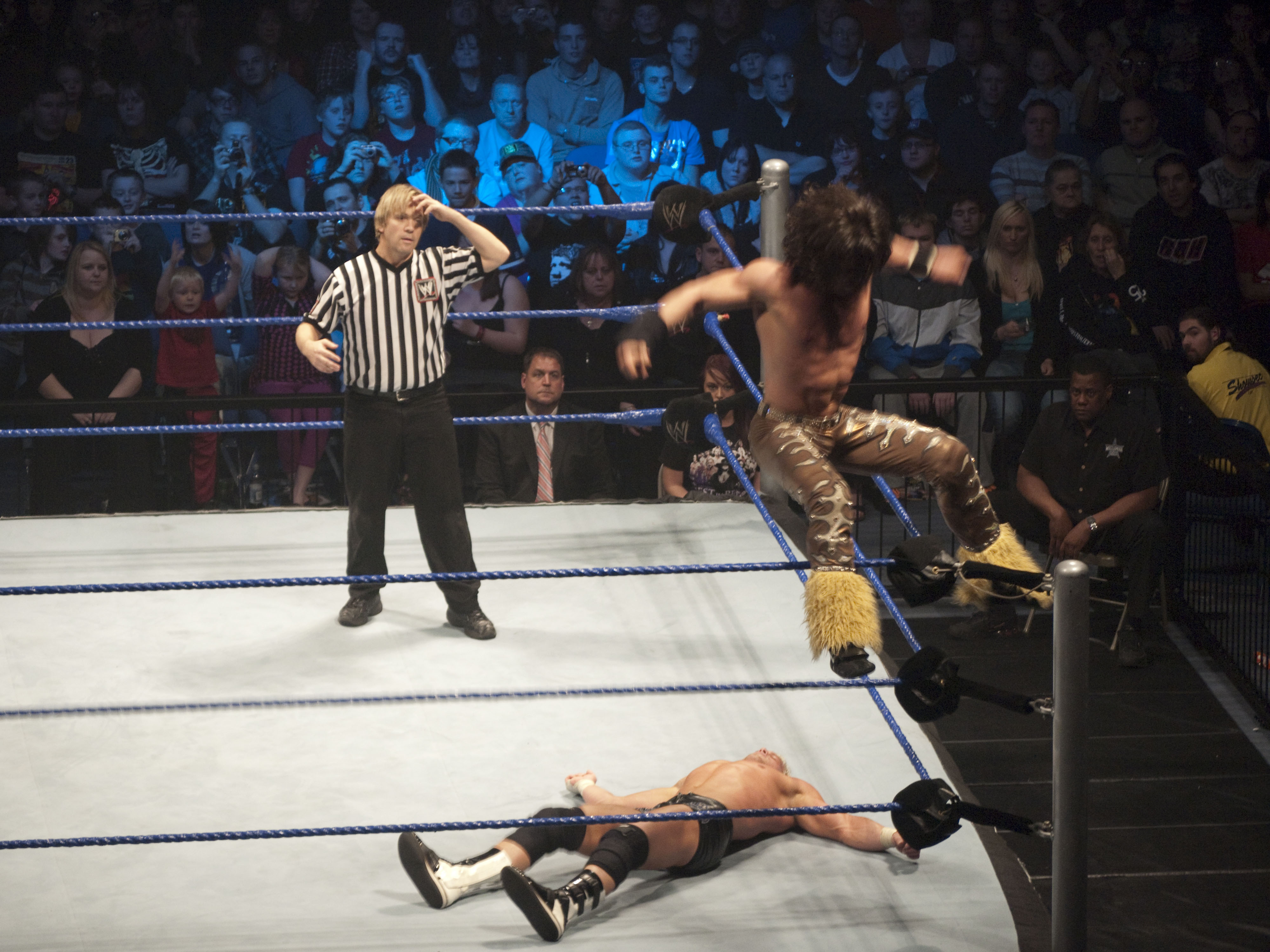
John Morrison performing Starship Pain (split-legged corkscrew moonsault) on Dolph Ziggler.

This variation involves performing a corkscrew moonsault after using the impact of their thighs on the ropes to flip themselves over. It was popularized by John Morrison, who called the move the Starship Pain and The End of The World.

=== Springboard moonsault ===
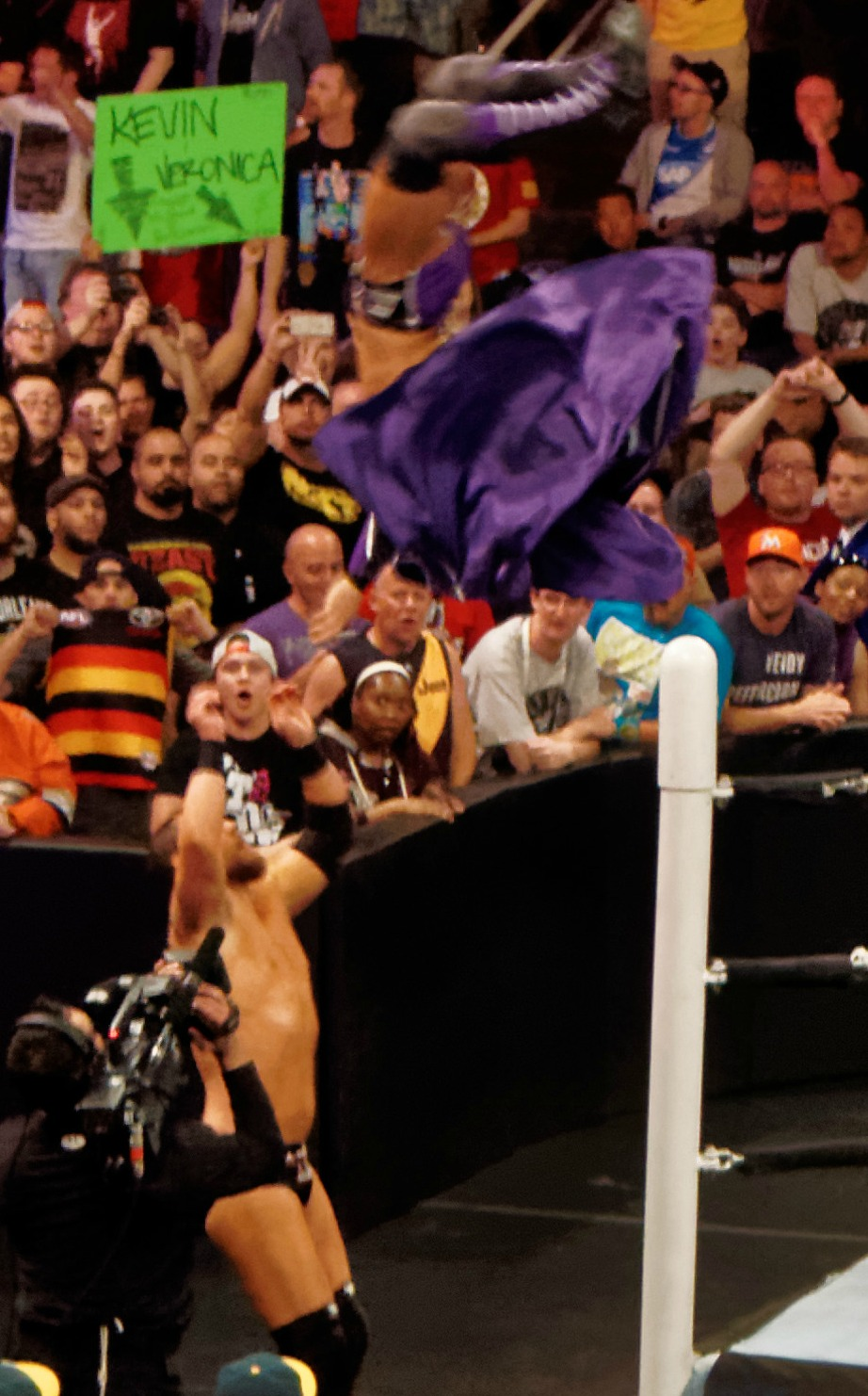
Neville performing a springboard moonsault on Curtis Axel

This is a move in which a wrestler springboards (bounces off ropes), then executes a backflip and lands on an opponent. This move is known as La Quebrada in lucha libre, sometimes shortened to simply Quebrada. A variation performed off the second rope from a running start, popularized by Chris Jericho, is known as the Lionsault. Ricochet would also use the move during his feud with Jericho and mockingly renamed it to the Ricosault.

A variation of the springboard moonsault is the Arabian Press (or a seated springboard moonsault), which involves the performer's thighs both landing on a single top rope, and the performer then continues to use the impact of their thighs on the rope to flip themselves over, executing a moonsault onto a prone opponent. Sabu and Sami Zayn are best known to use this version as signature moves.

When a springboard moonsault is performed onto an opponent on the floor outside the ring, rather than one in the ring, it is called an Asai Moonsault. It is named after Yoshihiro Asai, also known by his ring name Último Dragón, who popularized the move. This can also be used as a setup for an inverted DDT, as popularized by AJ Styles.

=== Standing moonsault ===
This is a wrestling move in which the wrestler does a backflip on the mat landing on the opponent. This move can be set up by preceding with a roundoff. WWE wrestler Apollo Crews uses this as his finishing maneuver. Jeff Cobb also uses the Move as the Gachimuchi-Sault.

=== Fallaway moonsault slam ===
This moves shows a wrestler grab an opponent like a fallaway slam but instead of just throwing them backwards does a backflip slamming the opponents back into the mat. This move is used by Cameron Grimes, and was innovated by Scott Steiner as a counter to a running crossbody. A diving/avalanche version of it is used by Bandido as Guerrero Moonsault.

=== Moonstomp ===
Popularized by Iyo Sky, while performing in World Wonder Ring Stardom, this move involves a moonsault from the top rope. Instead of landing in a splash position, the wrestler finishes the rotation with a double foot stomp on the prone opponent.

== See also ==
- Professional wrestling aerial techniques - (Moonsault leg drop; Moonsault double foot stomp)
- Professional wrestling attacks
