= CMLL 76th Anniversary Show =

Mexican Professional wrestling show

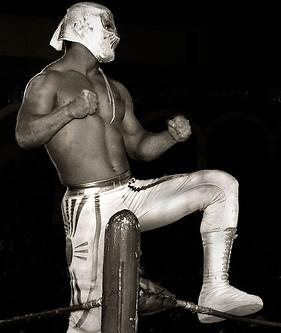
- Místico, main event winner
- Promotion: Consejo Mundial de Lucha Libre (CMLL)
- Date: September 18, 2009
- City: Mexico City, Mexico
- Venue: Arena Mexico
- Attendance: 18,000

Event chronology
← Previous; Infierno en el Ring	Next → Torneo Gran Alternativa

CMLL Anniversary Shows chronology
← Previous; 75th Anniversary	Next → 77th Anniversary

The CMLL 76th Anniversary Show (Spanish: 76. Aniversario de CMLL) was a professional wrestling major show event produced by Consejo Mundial de Lucha Libre (CMLL) that took place on September 18, 2009, in Arena Mexico, Mexico City, Mexico. The show celebrates the anniversary of the founding of CMLL, originally known as Empresa Mexicana de Lucha Libre. This year is the 76th anniversary of CMLL, the oldest professional wrestling promotion. in the world. The anniversary show is CMLL's biggest show of the year, their Super Bowl event. The CMLL Anniversary Show series is the longest-running annual professional wrestling show, starting in 1934.

The show featured six matches, with the main event being a Lucha de Apuestas, mask vs. hair match between Místico and Negro Casas. The second featured event is an eight-man, or Atómicos match featuring a team of Mexicans facing a team of Japanese wrestlers. Team Mexico consists of Último Guerrero, Atlantis, Black Warrior and Héctor Garza. Shocker was originally scheduled to be part of the team but in the days leading up to the event, he was quietly replaced with Atlantis without announcing why. Team Japan consisted of Jushin Thunder Liger, who had traveled to Mexico for the match, No Limit (Yujiro and Naito), who had been in Mexico for several months to gain experience and finally CMLL regular Okumura. The event also featured three regular Six-man tag team matches, a six-man Mini-Estrella match, and a women's tag team match.

== Production ==
=== Background ===
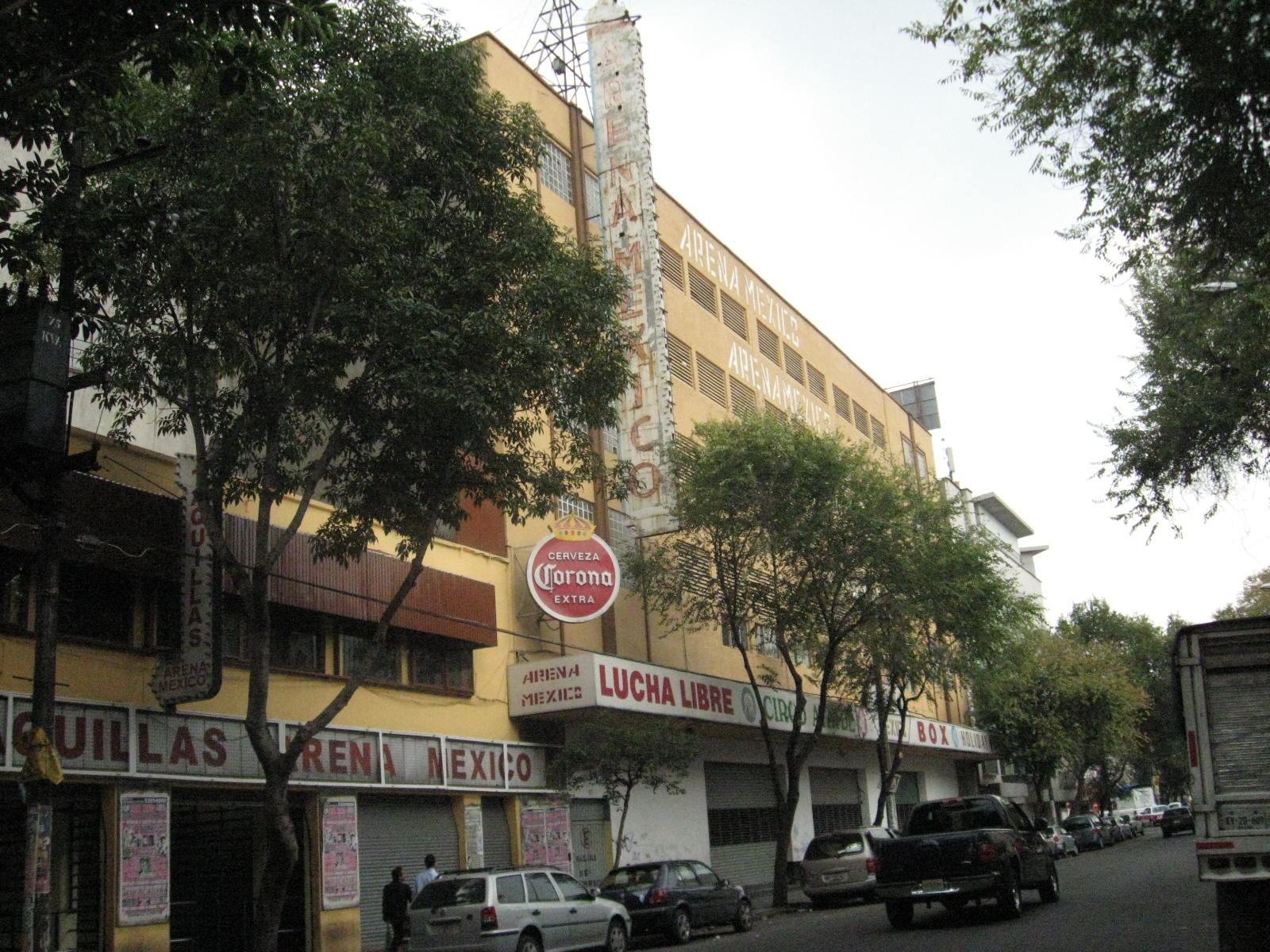
Arena México, CMLL's main venue and location of the Anniversary Show

The Mexican Lucha libre (professional wrestling) company Consejo Mundial de Lucha Libre (CMLL) started out under the name Empresa Mexicana de Lucha Libre ("Mexican Wrestling Company"; EMLL), founded by Salvador Lutteroth in 1933. Lutteroth, inspired by professional wrestling shows he had attended in Texas, decided to become a wrestling promoter and held his first show on September 21, 1933, marking what would be the beginning of organized professional wrestling in Mexico. Lutteroth would later become known as "the father of Lucha Libre" . A year later EMLL held the EMLL 1st Anniversary Show, starting the annual tradition of the Consejo Mundial de Lucha Libre Anniversary Shows that have been held each year ever since, most commonly in September.

Over the years the anniversary show would become the biggest show of the year for CMLL, akin to the Super Bowl for the National Football League (NFL) or WWE's WrestleMania event. The first anniversary show was held in Arena Modelo, which Lutteroth had bought after starting EMLL. In 1942–43 Lutteroth financed the construction of Arena Coliseo, which opened in April 1943. The EMLL 10th Anniversary Show was the first of the anniversary shows to be held in Arena Coliseo. In 1956 Lutteroth had Arena México built in the location of the original Arena Modelo, making Arena México the main venue of EMLL from that point on. Starting with the EMLL 23rd Anniversary Show, all anniversary shows except for the EMLL 46th Anniversary Show have been held in the arena that would become known as "The Cathedral of Lucha Libre". On occasion EMLL held more than one show labelled as their "Anniversary" show, such as two 33rd Anniversary Shows in 1966. Over time the anniversary show series became the oldest, longest-running annual professional wrestling show. In comparison, WWE's WrestleMania is only the fourth oldest still promoted show (CMLL's Arena Coliseo Anniversary Show and Arena México anniversary shows being second and third). EMLL was supposed to hold the EMLL 52nd Anniversary Show on September 20, 1985, but Mexico City was hit by a magnitude 8.0 earthquake. EMLL canceled the event both because of the general devastation but also over fears that Arena México might not be structurally sound after the earthquake.

When Jim Crockett Promotions was bought by Ted Turner in 1988 EMLL became the oldest still active promotion in the world. In 1991 EMLL was rebranded as "Consejo Mundial de Lucha Libre" and thus held the CMLL 59th Anniversary Show, the first under the new name, on September 18, 1992. Traditionally CMLL holds their major events on Friday Nights, replacing their regularly scheduled Super Viernes show.

=== Storylines ===
The event featured six professional wrestling matches with different wrestlers involved in pre-existing scripted feuds, plots and storylines. Wrestlers were portrayed as either heels (referred to as rudos in Mexico, those that portray the "bad guys") or faces (técnicos in Mexico, the "good guy" characters) as they followed a series of tension-building events, which culminated in a wrestling match or series of matches.

== Results ==
No.	Results	Stipulations	Times
1	Dark Angel and Lady Apache defeated La Amapola and Hiroka	tag team match	11:09
2	Pequeño Olímpico, Eléctrico and Bam Bam defeated Pierrothito, Pequeño Black Warrior and Pequeño Damián 666	Six-man "Lucha Libre rules" tag team match	10:13
3	El Sagrado, El Hijo del Fantasma and Máscara Dorada defeated Poder Mexica (Sangre Azteca and Dragón Rojo Jr.) and Misterioso Jr.	Six-man "Lucha Libre rules" tag team match	13:03
4	Volador Jr., La Sombra and La Máscara defeated Los Hijos del Averno (Averno, Mephisto and Ephesto) by disqualification	Six-man "Lucha Libre rules" tag team match	15:46
5	México vs Japan: Team Japan (Yujiro, Naito, Jushin Thunder Liger and Okumura) defeated Team Mexico (Último Guerrero, Atlantis, Black Warrior and Héctor Garza)	relevos atómicos, eight-man tag team match	11:23
6	Místico defeated Negro Casas	Best two-out-of-three falls Lucha de Apuestas mask vs. hair match.	25:14
