= Mephisto (wrestler) =

Mexican wrestler (born 1968)

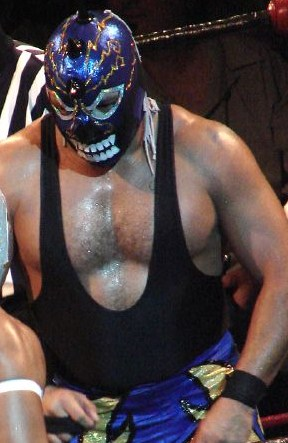
- Mephisto in June 2006

Personal information
- Born: December 10, 1968 (age 57) Toluca, Mexico

Professional wrestling career
- Ring name(s): Astro Jr. Astro Rey Jr. Kahoz Jr. Mephisto; Sendero
- Billed height: 1.75 m (5 ft 9 in)
- Billed weight: 90 kg (198 lb)
- Trained by: Astro Rey/Kahoz; Franco Colombo; El Gallo Giro; Negro Casas; Pacoman; Rey Halcon
- Debut: July 1988

Mephisto (born December 10, 1968) is a Mexican professional wrestler signed to Consejo Mundial de Lucha Libre (CMLL), where he is a member of the Los Infernales stable. As he is masked, his real name is not a matter of official record, which by Mexican wrestling traditions means that his personal life is kept secret from the general public.

A second-generation wrestler, being the son of Astro Rey/Kahoz, he worked as both Astro Rey Jr. and Kahoz Jr. before rising to prominence in 2001 as a member of Los Infernales under the gimmick of Mephisto. He and fellow member Averno later formed a regular tag team, Los Hijos del Averno ("The Sons of Hell"), which was considered one of Mexico's top teams in the 2000s. Mephisto then became the leader of Los Hijos del Infierno ("The Sons of the Inferno") alongside Ephesto and Luciferno.

Mephisto has won multiple individual CMLL championships and held the Mexican National Trios Championship with the other Hijos del Infierno. Previously, he has held the CMLL World Tag Team Championship, CMLL World Trios Championship, CMLL World Welterweight Championship, Mexican National Light Heavyweight Championship, Mexican National Welterweight Championship, NWA World Welterweight Championship, and was the inaugural NWA World Historic Welterweight Champion. He also won the Torneo Nacional de Parejas Increíbles with Místico in 2016.

== Personal life ==
The man later known as Mephisto was born on December 12, 1968, in Mexico City, the son of Alberto Leonel Hernández López, better known as the professional wrestler "Astro Rey" (Spanish for "Astro King") and later on as "Kahoz". By 1971, his father had started wrestling, which meant that the future Mephisto grew up around wrestlers, wanting to become one himself from a very early age.

== Professional wrestling career ==
=== Early career (1988–1992) ===
After training under his father and uncle, a luchador known as "El Gallo Giro", he made his debut in 1988 under the ring name "Kahoz Jr.", a tribute to his father's final wrestling character, working for various promotions in Mexico and Japan. His father, however, urged him to change gimmicks to the one that got his father the most fame, "Astro Rey Jr." (or simply "Astro Jr.").

=== Consejo Mundial de Lucha Libre (1992–present) ===
==== Astro Rey Jr. / Sendero (1992–2001) ====
Astro Rey Jr. made his debut for Consejo Mundial de Lucha Libre (CMLL) on October 4, 1992, at their main venue, Arena México, teaming with Aguila de Plata to defeat Bufalo Salvaje and El Cortado. He received his first major opportunity on April 7, 1995, when he teamed with veteran Dr. Wagner Jr. for the Torneo Gran Alternativa ("Great Alternative Tournament"). They defeated Guerrero de la Muerte and Mocho Cota and Atlantico and Atlantis to advance to the finals, which they lost to Shocker and Silver King.

From late 1997 to 1998, he wrestled under the name Sendero, which earned him a spot at the CMLL 65th Anniversary Show on September 18, 1998, where he and El Oriental lost to Halcon Negro Jr. and Virus. Upon his return as Astro Rey Jr., on March 22, 1999, he won the Mexican National Welterweight Championship from Arkangel de la Muerte. On April 2, he was paired with Shocker in that year's Torneo Gran Alternativa, defeating Apolo Dantés and Karloff Lagarde Jr. in the first round, before losing to Atlantico and Mr. Niebla in the second round. Astro Rey Jr. lost the title to Karloff Lagarde Jr. on October 23, 2000, leading to a mask vs. hair Lucha de Apuestas ("bet match") between the two seven days later, which Astro Rey Jr. won, forcing his opponent to have his hair shaved off.

==== Los Infernales (2001–2006) ====
In the summer of 2001, El Satánico, who was feuding with former Los Infernales ("The Infernals") stablemates Último Guerrero, Rey Bucanero and Tarzan Boy, recruited him to be a part of the new incarnation of Los Infernales and feud with the splinter group. During a televised segment, Satánico used his supposed "satanic powers" to turn tecnico (face) Rencor Latino into one of his "minions", the rudo (heel) "Averno" ("Hell"), while Astro Rey Jr. became Mephisto; unlike Averno, no references to his previous identities were made at the time. When Tarzan Boy was injured and unable to wrestle, Bucanero and Guerrero recruited Máscara Mágica to even the numbers. The storyline between the two factions culminated when all seven wrestlers fought in a steel cage match at the CMLL 68th Anniversary Show on September 28, where the winning side would gain the rights to the Los Infernales name. In the end, Satánico pinned Mágica to gain the rights and his mask.

On June 23, 2002, Los Infernales won the Mexican National Trios Championship from Olímpico, Mr. Niebla and Safari, which they lost to La Familia de Tijuana (Nicho el Millonario, Halloween and Damián 666) on September 27. When Nicho stopped appearing for CMLL during their feud, the trios championship was vacated, but Los Infernales refused to take them without a match. This storyline led to an eight-team trios title tournament that Los Infernales lost. Instead, they won a tournament to become the number one contenders for the CMLL World Trios Championship, but lost to champions Black Tiger III, Dr. Wagner Jr. and Universo 2000 on August 1. At the end of the year, Averno and Mephisto turned on Satánico and split from the group, venturing out on their own. On February 4, 2004, Mephisto defeated El Satánico to win the CMLL World Welterweight Championship, which he successfully defended against the likes of Volador Jr., Zumbido, Felino and Neutrón.

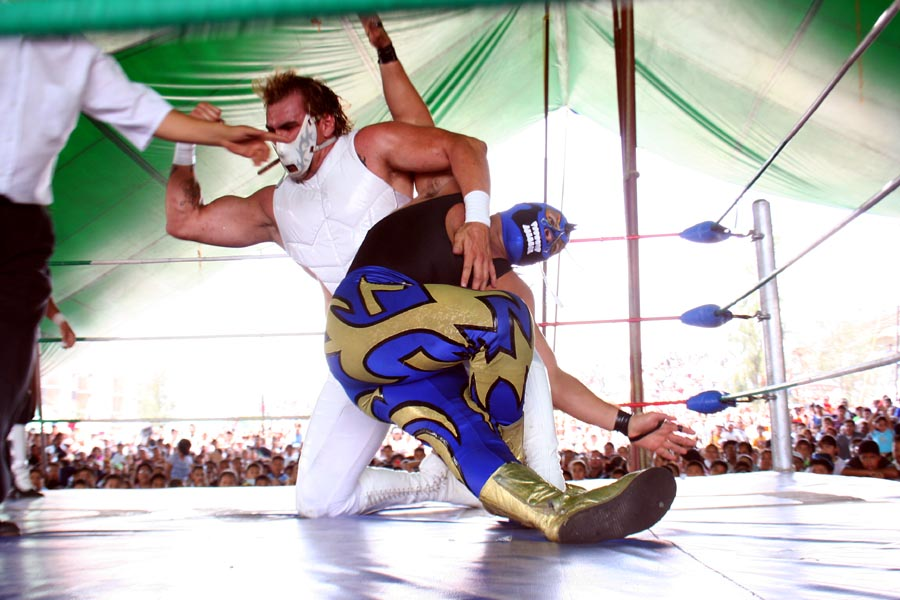
Mephisto during a match with Electroshock in May 2005

Mephisto and Averno defeated Atlantis and Blue Panther for the CMLL World Tag Team Championship on April 2, 2005. The team would defend the title several times over the next year in very well-received matches that led to several reporters labeling them as one of the best Mexican tag teams in the 21st century. At the CMLL 72nd Anniversary Show on September 16, Mephisto, Damián El Terrible and Tarzan Boy lost to Dr. Wagner Jr., Místico and Negro Casas. Their most prominent defense was on the last Arena México show of 2005 against Casas and El Hijo del Santo. In early 2006, they successfully defended their title twice against Místico and Black Warrior, who were unable to get along, before losing it to Místico and Casas on April 14. At the CMLL 73rd Anniversary Show on September 29, they teamed with Alex Koslov to defeat El Sagrado, Felino and Último Dragón.

==== Triada del Terror / Perros del Mal (2006–2008) ====
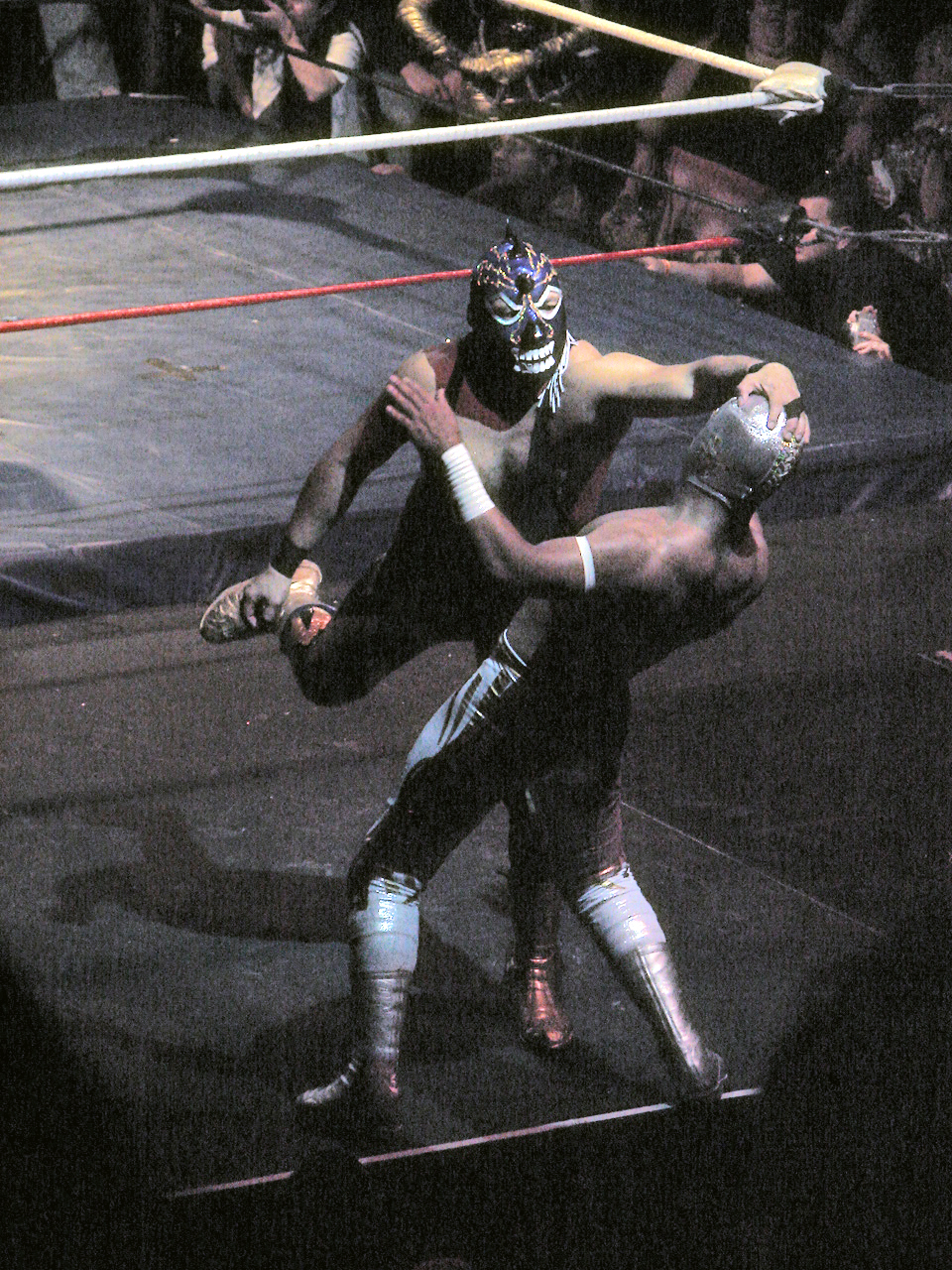
Mephisto trying to pull Místico's mask off during a match in 2006

In late 2006, Mephisto and Averno formed a regular trio with Ephesto (named after the Greek god Hephaestus), who was given an "underworld" character. The three came to the ring wearing black, hooded robes and were briefly introduced as Los Ku Klux Klan, before dropping the controversial name to become La Triada del Terror ("The Trio of Terror"). Mephisto lost his CMLL World Welterweight Championship to Místico on April 10, 2007, ending his reign after 1,141 days. At the CMLL 74th Anniversary Show on September 28, he, Averno and Olímpico lost to Bucanero, Casas and Marco Corleone.

Mephisto and Averno defeated Dos Caras Jr. and La Sombra in the finals of a tournament on January 25 to become the number one contenders for the CMLL World Tag Team Championship, defeating Atlantis and Guerrero for the title on February 1, but lost it to Místico and Héctor Garza on March 10. When the commission declared the title vacant after a match resulted in a double disqualification, the two teams fought for the vacant title on May 23, with Místico and Garza reclaiming it. La Triada del Terror defeated El Hijo del Fantasma, La Máscara and Volador Jr. at the CMLL 75th Anniversary Show on September 19. On December 7, they defeated Místico and Garza for their third CMLL World Tag Team Championship. With the exception of Ephesto, Mephisto and Averno were invited to join Perro Aguayo Jr.'s Perros del Mal ("The Bad Dogs") faction; they were only briefly a part of it before Aguayo Jr. and a number of other members left CMLL.

==== Los Hijos del Averno (2009–2014) ====
Mephisto and Averno remained with CMLL, forming the group La Jauria del Terror ("The Hounds of Terror"), later renamed Los Hijos del Averno ("The Sons of Hell"), alongside Ephesto, El Texano Jr. and El Terrible. On January 16, 2009, Mephisto and Averno lost the championship to Super Sky Team (La Sombra and Volador Jr.). Three days later, Mephisto unsuccessfully challenged La Sombra for the NWA World Welterweight Championship. At Homenaje a Dos Leyendas ("Homage to Two Legends") on March 20, Los Hijos del Averno defeated Blue Panther, El Sagrado and Toscano. On May 27, Mephisto defeated La Sombra in a rematch to capture the title. Being a champion made Mephisto eligible for the Universal Championship tournament on June 12, where he lost to Garza in the first round. He made his first successful title defense against Místico on July 13. At the CMLL 76th Anniversary Show on September 18, Los Hijos del Averno lost to La Máscara, La Sombra and Volador Jr. On October 12, Mephisto was the last wrestler eliminated by Volador Jr. in the Reyes del Aire ("Kings of the Air") torneo cibernetico. At Sin Salida ("No Escape") on December 4, he and Ephesto unsuccessfully challenged La Sombra and Volador Jr. for the CMLL World Tag Team Championship. Nine days later, he failed to win the Mexican National Light Heavyweight Championship from Místico.

As part of their ongoing rivalry, Mephisto was forced to team with El Hijo del Fantasma for the Torneo Nacional de Parejas Increíbles ("National Incredible Pairs Tournament") on January 22, 2010, but lost to El Terrible and Volador Jr. in the first round. Four days later, he retained his title against Valiente. At Homenaje a Dos Leyendas on March 19, Los Hijos del Averno defeated El Hijo del Fantasma, Máscara Dorada and Valiente. He and rookie Cancerbero lost in the first round of the Torneo Gran Alternativa on April 16 to Diamante and La Sombra. On July 30, La Sombra defeated Mephisto in the first round of that year's Universal Championship tournament. During Mephisto's reign, his title was replaced with the NWA World Historic Welterweight Championship. Mephisto was one of fourteen men putting their mask on the line in a Lucha de Apuestas steel cage match in the main event of the CMLL 77th Anniversary Show on September 3; he was the second man to leave the cage, retaining his mask as all three members of Los Hijos del Averno quickly left the cage. He participated in the La Copa Junior ("The Junior Cup") tournament, but lost to La Sombra in the first round on December 10. Mephisto used a pair of boxing gloves to retain his title against El Hijo del Fantasma on January 14, 2011. They were again paired for the Torneo Nacional de Parejas Increíbles on February 18, losing to La Sombra and Misterioso II in the first round. On March 13, Mephisto lost the NWA World Historic Welterweight Championship to La Sombra. In April, El Terrible and El Texano Jr. split from Los Hijos del Averno to form a new faction with Bucanero called La Fuerza TRT ("The TRT Power").

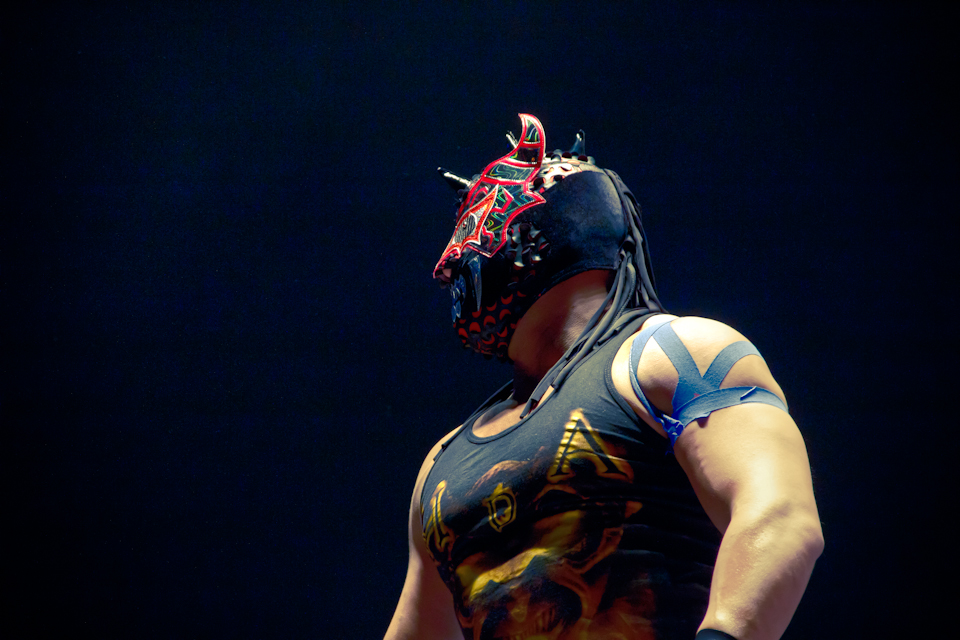
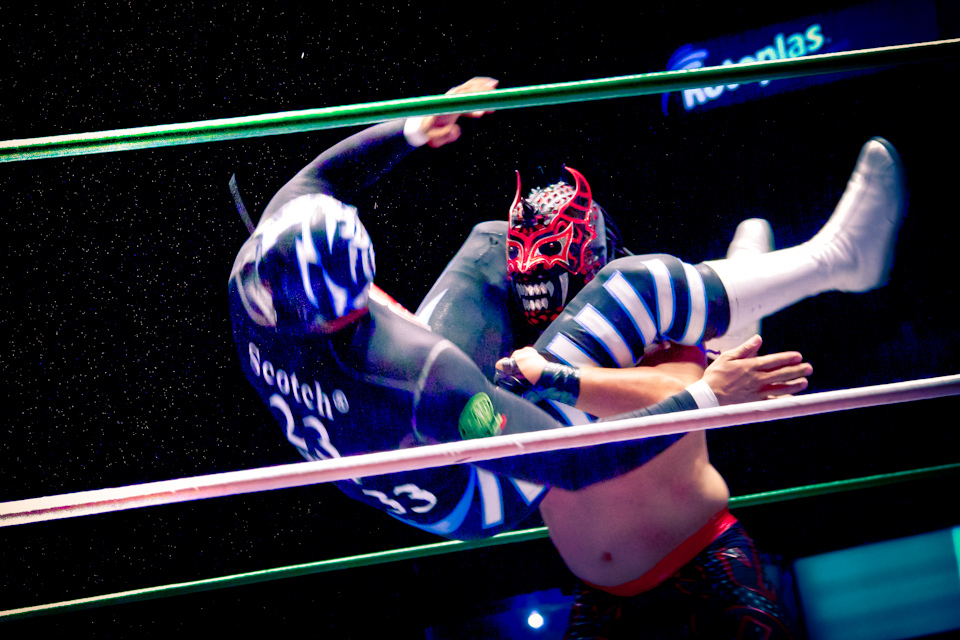
Mephisto during a match with La Sombra in December 2011

Los Hijos del Averno defeated La Generación Dorada ("The Golden Generation"; Dorada, La Máscara and La Sombra) to win the CMLL World Trios Championship on July 15. A month later, Mephisto failed to win Dorada's CMLL World Welterweight Championship. On September 2, he defeated stablemate Ephesto in the first round of the Universal Championship tournament, but lost to Bucanero in the quarter-finals. At the CMLL 78th Anniversary Show on September 30, Mephisto participated in the semi-final of the Leyenda de Plata ("Silver Legend") tournament, where he eliminated Metro and Dragón Rojo Jr., before being the last wrestler eliminated by Jushin Thunder Liger. He again failed to win Dorada's title on November 4 and La Máscara's NWA World Historic Middleweight Championship on December 6. For the 2012 Torneo Nacional de Parejas Increíbles on February 17, Mephisto and Máximo lost to La Sombra and Mr. Águila in the first round after Mephisto attacked Máximo for accidentally kissing him. Two days later, Los Hijos del Averno lost the title to El Bufete del Amor ("The Buffet of Love"; Corleone, Máximo and Rush). He reunited with Cancerbero for the Torneo Gran Alternativa on April 6, defeating Diamante and Valiente in the first round before losing to Raziel and Volador Jr. in the quarter-finals. At the CMLL 79th Anniversary Show on September 14, he, Ephesto and Niebla Roja defeated Delta, Stuka Jr. and Valiente.

On August 13, 2013, Mephisto defeated La Máscara to win the Mexican National Light Heavyweight Championship. Later that month, he was defeated by La Sombra in the first round of that year's Universal Championship tournament. On September 13, at the CMLL 80th Anniversary Show, Mephisto, Euforia and Roja defeated Brazo de Plata, Máximo and Titán. He successfully defended the title against La Máscara on October 7, Titán on November 3, and Atlantis on January 1, 2014. On January 31, he was paired with rookie Espanto Jr. for that year's Torneo Gran Alternativa, losing to Soberano Jr. and Volador Jr. in the first round. After further successful title defenses against La Máscara on March 11 and Mr. Águila on April 14, he participated in the Reyes del Aire on April 27, where he was the last wrestler eliminated by Stuka Jr. The next day, Averno left CMLL, leading to Mephisto and Ephesto dropping the "Hijos del Averno" name. Mephisto participated in the Universal Championship tournament on August 15, losing to Casas in the first round. He entered the La Copa Junior VIP ("The VIP Junior Cup") tournament on September 26, defeating Guerrero Maya Jr. in the first round, Shocker in the quarter-finals and Volador Jr. in the semi-finals to qualify for the finals on October 10, where he lost to Máximo.

==== Los Hijos del Infierno (2015–2021) ====
In early 2015, Mephisto and Ephesto began teaming with Luciferno as "Los Hijos del Infierno" ("The Sons of the Infierno"), with Mephisto serving as the team leader. They defeated Los Reyes de la Atlantida ("The Kings of the Atlantis"; Atlantis, Delta and Guerrero Maya Jr.) on August 9 to win the Mexican National Trios Championship. On August 24, Mephisto lost the Mexican National Light Heavyweight Championship after 741 days to Atlantis, failing to regain the title on September 20. On October 9, he participated in that year's Universal Championship tournament, defeating Ephesto in the first round and Místico in the quarter-finals, but lost to Atlantis in the semi-finals. Three days later, he unsuccessfully challenged Volador Jr. for the NWA World Historic Welterweight Championship. Mephisto began 2016 alongside Kraneo and Ripper unsuccessfully challenging Sky Team (Místico, Valiente and Volador Jr.) for the CMLL World Trios Championship on January 4. He unsuccessfully challenged Dorada for the CMLL World Welterweight Championship on February 19. At Homenaje a Dos Leyendas on March 18, Los Hijos del Infierno defeated Ángel de Oro, Rey Cometa and Titán. For the Torneo Gran Alternativa shortly after, Mephisto and Yago defeated Pierroth and Raijin in the first round and Dorada and Pegasso in the quarter-finals, but lost to Esfinge and Volador Jr. in the semi-finals.

After again failing to win Volador Jr.'s title, Mephisto was paired with Místico for the Torneo Nacional de Parejas Increíbles, defeating Ángel de Oro and Pólvora, Corleone and Rush and Mr. Niebla and Volador Jr. to advance to the finals, which they won on April 29 by defeating Carístico and Cibernético. On May 3, Mephisto defeated Dorada to win the CMLL World Welterweight Championship for the second time, successfully defending it against Místico on July 11. He was set to partake in the International Gran Prix, but was replaced by La Máscara due to a groin injury he suffered in June. At the CMLL 83rd Anniversary Show on September 2, he, Ephesto and Shocker lost to Corleone, Máximo and Volador Jr. Later that month, he successfully defended the title against Titán. Mephisto also participated in the following month's Universal Championship tournament, but was eliminated in the first round. On November 22, he unsuccessfully challenged Volador Jr. for the NWA World Historic Welterweight Championship. On January 27, 2017, Mephisto successfully defended his CMLL World Welterweight Championship against Carístico. As part of their feud, they were paired for the Torneo Nacional de Parejas Increíbles, defeating Ángel de Oro and Bucanero in the first round and Diamante Azul and Pierroth in the quarter-finals, before losing to Bárbaro Cavernario and Volador Jr. in the semi-finals. Mephisto, Hechicero and Luciferno failed to win Sky Team's CMLL World Trios Championship at Homenaje a Dos Leyendas on March 17. Three days later, he again retained his title against Carístico, as well as against Negro Casas on May 15.

Mephisto and Raziel lost to Flyer and Volador Jr. in the first round of that year's Torneo Gran Alternativa on June 9. On July 7, Místico defeated him in the first round of the Universal Championship tournament. On July 25, Los Hijos del Infierno lost the Mexican National Trios Championship to Nueva Generación Dinamita (El Cuatrero, Forastero and Sansón). The following month, he defeated Stuka Jr. to retain his title. At the CMLL 84th Anniversary Show on September 16, he, Satoshi Kojima and Último Guerrero lost to Carístico, Flip Gordon and Volador Jr. On December 1, Mephisto participated in the La Copa Junior VIP, where he eliminated Carístico before being the last wrestler eliminated by Niebla Roja. Ten days later, he outlasted nine other wrestlers, lastly eliminating Volador Jr., to win the Reyes del Aire VIP in Puebla. Mephisto was again paired with Místico for the Torneo Nacional de Parejas Increíbles on February 2, 2018, defeating Hechicero and Soberano Jr. in the first round and Gran Guerrero and Roja in the quarter-finals, but lost to Último Guerrero and Volador Jr. in the semi-finals. Later that month, he retained his title against Soberano Jr. He reunited with Yago for the Torneo Gran Alternativa on May 4, defeating Ángel de Oro and Robin in the first round and Electrico and Místico in the quarter-finals, before Flyer and Volador Jr. defeated them in the semi-finals. Mephisto retained his title against Titán on August 7 and 28. At the CMLL 85th Anniversary Show on September 14, he and La Peste Negra ("The Black Plague"; Casas and El Felino) lost to Ángel de Oro, Audaz and Roja.

At Homenaje a Dos Leyendas on March 15, 2019, Mephisto, Ephesto and Templario lost to Azul, Soberano Jr. and Titán. Four days later, after thirteen successful defenses of the CMLL World Welterweight Championship, Mephisto lost the title to Dragon Lee. For the Torneo Nacional de Parejas Increíbles on April 12, he and Carístico defeated Flyer and Forastero in the first round and Euforia and Guerrero Maya Jr. in the quarter-finals, but lost to Cavernario and Titán in the semi-finals. At the CMLL 86th Anniversary Show on September 27, he, Ángel de Oro and Roja defeated Euforia, Gran Guerrero and Soberano Jr. On November 18, he unsuccessfully challenged Roja for the CMLL World Light Heavyweight Championship. During the following year's Torneo Nacional de Parejas Increíbles, he and Titán lost to Carístico and Forastero in the first round. He competed in the La Copa Junior VIP on March 26, 2021, but was the first wrestler eliminated. Mephisto and now-rudo Ángel de Oro entered the Torneo Nacional de Parejas Increíbles on June 18, defeating Cavernario and El Felino in the first round before losing to Carístico and Virus in the quarter-finals. On July 16, he participated in the Leyenda de Plata, defeating Star Jr. in the first round before losing to Místico in the quarter-finals.

==== Return of Los Infernales (2021–present) ====
Mephisto in 2026

At the CMLL 88th Anniversary Show on September 24, Mephisto rejoined the reformed Los Infernales alongside El Satánico, Euforia and Hechicero. Shortly after, he reunited with old Los Infernales stablemate Averno, who returned to CMLL after a seven-year absence. On September 16, 2022, at the CMLL 89th Anniversary Show, Los Infernales defeated Casas, Star Jr. and Titán. At Noche de Campeones ("Night of Champions") on September 30, Los Infernales defeated El Sagrado and Los Gemelos Diablo (Gemelo Diablo I and Gemelo Diablo II) to win the CMLL World Trios Championship.

On June 2, 2023, Los Infernales lost the title to Atlantis Jr., Star Jr. and Volador Jr. Following the match, Mephisto was attacked by Hechicero, who left Los Infernales. On September 27, 2024, at Noche de Campeones, now with Averno replacing Hechicero, Los Infernales defeated Máscara Dorada, Neón and Star Jr. to win the CMLL World Trios Championship. They held the titles until May 16, 2025, when they lost it to El Sky Team (Dorada, Místico and Neón). At Homenaje a Dos Leyendas on March 20, 2026, Mephisto competed in a torneo cibernetico for the Copa Infernal, but was eliminated by Toscano.

=== New Japan Pro-Wrestling (2009–2017) ===
On February 15, 2009, Mephisto made his New Japan Pro-Wrestling (NJPW) debut, unsuccessfully challenging Místico for the CMLL World Welterweight Championship in Sumo Hall, Tokyo.

Mephisto took part in the three-day Fantastica Mania 2013 event, co-promoted by CMLL and NJPW, in January 2013. During the first night on January 18, he teamed with Gedo and Jado to defeat Atlantis, Jushin Thunder Liger and Tiger Mask in a six-man tag team match. The following night, Mephisto and Okumura defeated Diamante and Máscara Dorada in a tag team match. During the third and final night, Mephisto teamed with Euforia and Kazuchika Okada in a six-man tag team main event, where they were defeated by Atlantis, Hiroshi Tanahashi and Prince Devitt.

In January 2014, Mephisto returned to Japan to take part in the five-day Fantastica Mania 2014 tour. In the main event of the fourth show on January 18, he successfully defended the Mexican National Light Heavyweight Championship against Místico. In January 2015, Mephisto returned to Japan to take part in the Fantastica Mania 2015 tour, during which he joined Bullet Club and successfully defended the Mexican National Light Heavyweight Championship against Stuka Jr. However, when he returned for the Fantastica Mania 2016 tour in January 2016, no reference was made to his association with Bullet Club. In the main event of the tour's final show, Mephisto unsuccessfully challenged Volador Jr. for the NWA World Historic Welterweight Championship.

== Championships and accomplishments ==
- Consejo Mundial de Lucha Libre
  - NWA World Welterweight Championship (1 time)
  - NWA World Historic Welterweight Championship (1 time, inaugural)
  - CMLL World Welterweight Championship (2 times)
  - CMLL World Tag Team Championship (3 times) – with Averno
  - CMLL World Trios Championship (3 times) – with Averno and Ephesto (1), with Hechicero and Euforia (1), with Averno and Euforia (1)
  - Mexican National Light Heavyweight Championship (1 time)
  - Mexican National Welterweight Championship (1 time) (Note: title recognized and promoted in CMLL as well as several other Mexican wrestling promotions.)
  - Mexican National Trios Championship (2 times) – with El Satánico and Averno (1 time), with Ephesto and Luciferno (1 time)
  - Reyes del Aire VIP (Puebla) - 2017
  - Torneo Nacional de Parejas Increíbles (2016) – with Místico
  - Copa Bobby Bonales 2023
- International Wrestling Revolution Group
  - Copa Higher Power (1999) – with Máscara Mágica, Rey Bucanero, El Satánico, and Último Guerrero
- Pro Wrestling Illustrated
  - PWI ranked him # 54 of the 500 best singles wrestlers of the PWI 500 in 2006.

== Luchas de Apuestas record ==
Winner (wager)	Loser (wager)	Location	Event	Date	Notes
Astro Rey Jr. (mask)	El Métalico (mask) (Note: Not the wrestler that would work for CMLL as Métalico later on.)	Mexico City	CMLL Domingos De Coliseo	November 19, 1995	
Astro Rey Jr. (mask)	Gekko (mask)	Sapporo, Japan	Live event	June 25, 1996	
Astro Rey Jr. (mask)	Karloff Lagarde Jr. (hair)	Puebla, Puebla	CMLL Lunes Arena Puebla	October 30, 2000	
