= Misterioso Jr. =

Mexican professional wrestler

José Luís Hurtado Soto
Personal information
- Born: Torreón, Coahuila, Mexico

Professional wrestling career
- Ring name(s): Misterioso II / Misterioso Jr. Super Spider
- Billed height: 1.76 m (5 ft 9 1/2 in)
- Billed weight: 95 kg (209 lb)
- Billed from: Torreón, Coahuila, Mexico
- Trained by: Dr. Wagner; Shocker; Franco Colombo; El Satánico
- Debut: 1994

José Luís Hurtado Soto also known as Misterioso Jr. (Birthdate unknown) is a Mexican professional wrestler, who is also referred to as Misterioso II. Misterioso Jr. is the nephew of Misterioso who wore a similar mask until losing it in 1997. Misterioso Jr. has mainly worked for the Mexican promotion Consejo Mundial de Lucha Libre (CMLL) throughout his career, where he won the 2006 Gran Alternativa tournament with Perro Aguayo Jr. Over the summer of 2009, Misterioso Jr. joined the wrestling group Poder Mexica.

== Professional wrestling career ==
The wrestler who would later become known as "Misterioso Jr." made his debut in 1995 under the ring name "Super Spider", a masked look patterned after the comic book hero Spider-Man. He worked as Super Spider on the Mexican independent circuit from 1995 until 2003, where he changes his name to "Misterioso II" and began teaming with his uncle Misterioso. He also began working for Consejo Mundial de Lucha Libre (CMLL) in the opening matches.

=== Consejo Mundial de Lucha Libre ===
In 2004 Misterioso and Misterioso II participated in the Gran Alternativa tournament, a tag team tournament where an experienced wrestler teams up with a Novato (rookie) in a one night tournament. The Misteriosos were eliminated in the first round by eventual winners Místico and El Hijo del Santo. Shortly after the Gran Alternativa Misteriosos II worked on the CMLL 71st Anniversary Show, teaming with Místico and Volador Jr. to defeat the team of Averno, Mephisto and Olímpico. capping off his first full year in CMLL Misterio II participated in the annual Leyenda de Plata tournament, but did not make it past the qualifying torneo cibernetico match as he was eliminated by Super Crazy as the first man out. When the original Misterioso left CMLL the promotion began billing Misterioso II as "Misterioso Jr.", although they alternated between the names, not consistently using one or the other. In 2005 Misterioso Jr. once again competed in the Gran Alternativa, this time teaming with veteran Dr. Wagner Jr. The team defeated Pierroth Jr. and Nitro in the first round, Universo 2000 and Doctor X in the second round before losing to Atlantis and La Máscara in the finals of the tournament. He also competed in that year's Leyenda de Plata, but once again did not manage to get past the first round as he was eliminated by El Hijo del Santo. By the end of 2005 Misteriosos Jr. turned Rudo (the Spanish term for Heel or bad guy) after being a Tecnico (good guy) for his entire career up until this point. Misterioso Jr. joined the Los Perros del Mal group as their youngest member, often teaming with El Terrible and El Texano Jr. For the 2006 Gran Alternativa Misterioso Jr. teamed with Los Perros leader Perro Aguayo Jr. In the first round they defeated Lizmark Jr. and Máscara Purpura, in the second round the beat Héctor Garza and Hombre Sin Nombre and in the finals they defeated Último Guerrero and Nitro giving Misterioso Jr. his first big profile win. Misterioso Jr. could not follow his Gran Alternativa success in that year's Leyenda de Plata tournament as he once again did not make it past the qualifying the torneo cibernetico. On March 30, 2007 Misterioso Jr. appeared on CMLL's Homenaje a Dos Leyendas show, teaming with Black Warrior and Tarzan Boy to defeat Leono, El Sagrado and Volador Jr. in a Six-man tag team match. Misterioso Jr. did not compete in the 2007 Gran Alternativa or Leyenda de Plata, keeping a low profile until appearing on the CMLL 74th Anniversary Show on September 29, 2007. On the night Misterioso Jr., El Texano Jr. and Virus lost to Último Dragón, La Máscara and Volador Jr. On August 29, 2008 Misterioso Jr. teamed with La Peste Negra (El Felino and Heavy Metal) in the second match of CMLL's Sin Pieda Pay-Per-View, losing to El Hijo del Fantasma, La Máscara and La Sombra. Two days after Sin Piedad Misterioso Jr. won his first championship as he defeated El Gallo for the Occidente (Western) Light Heavyweight Championship on August 31, 2008 in Guadalajara, Jalisco. When Perro Aguayo Jr. left CMLL, taking the Los Perros del Mal stable with him, Misterioso Jr. opted to stay with CMLL, transferring to Los Hijos del Averno, a group established to fill the void left by Los Perros del Mal.

==== Poder Mexica ====
In early 2009 Black Warrior was suspended for a month, leaving his group Poder Mexica one man short for their six-man matches. Misterioso Jr. was chosen to fill the part, becoming an unofficial member of Poder Mexica, teaming with Sangre Azteca and Dragón Rojo Jr., helping them to defeat Hijo del Fantasma, Héctor Garza and La Máscara on the 2009 Homenaje a Dos Leyendas PPV. After Black Warrior's suspension was over he took over from Misterioso Jr. for a while, but over the summer of 2009 Misterioso Jr. began teaming more with Poder Mexico' than Black Warrior did. On August 18, 2009 Misterioso Jr. lost the Occidente Light Heavyweight Championship to Mictlán. At the CMLL 76th Anniversary Show Misterioso Jr. once again teamed with Poder Mexico, this time actually announced as a member Poder Mexica, in a loss to El Sagrado, Hijo del Fantasma and Máscara Dorada. Shortly after the Anniversary show Sangrea Azteca confirmed that Misterioso Jr. was indeed the newest member of Poder Mexica. On December 19, 2009 it was announced by the Comisión de Box y Lucha Libre Mexico D.F. that Poder Mexica had been stripped of the Mexican National Trios title because Black Warrior had left CMLL, breaking up the team. At the same time they announced an eight team tournament to crown a new trios champion. The top half of the bracket took place on December 22, 2009 and the bottom half of the bracket took place on December 29. In the top bracket the team of Máscara Dorada, Stuka Jr. and Metro qualified for the finals. The bottom bracket took place on December 29, 2009 and saw Poder Mexica (Azteca, Rojo Jr. and Misterioso Jr.) defeat Fabian El Gitano, Máximo and Rouge and then Delta, Leono and Valiente to qualify for the final. On January 6, 2010 Mascara Dorada, Stuka Jr. and Metro defeated Poder Mexica to become the new Mexican National Trios Champions. In March 2013 Misterioso Jr. was announced as participating in the 2013 En Busca de un Ídolo ("In search of an Idol") tournament that would take place from May to July, 2013 as one of eight competitors.

==== La Comando Caribeño ====
In 2013 Misterioso Jr. began to team regularly with the newest version of Comandante Pierroth and the recently turned Sagrado to form a group called La Comando Caribeño ("The Caribbean Commando"), adopting a storyline allegiance to Puerto Rico. In early 2015 La Comando began a storyline rivalry with the team of Delta and Guerrero Maya Jr. over the CMLL Arena Coliseo Tag Team Championship. On February 28, 2015 Misterioso Jr. and Sagrado defeated Delta and Guerrero Maya Jr. to win the championship. On December 19, 2015 La Comando lost the CMLL Arena Coliseo Tag Team Championship to the team of Guerrero Maya Jr. and The Panther. During the summer of 2016 Comandante Pierroth joined up with his son Rush and became a member of Los Ingobernables, leaving Sagrado and Misterioso Jr. on their own. Misterioso wrestled his last match for CMLL in March 2024, after which he wrestled on the Mexican independent scene. He eventually lost his mask to El Hijo del Santo, thus revealing his real name.

==== Japan and United States (2012-current) ====
On January 21, 2012 Misterioso Jr. travelled to Japan to wrestle for the first time, participating in the CMLL/New Japan Pro-Wrestling (NJPW) Fantastica Mania tour. On the first night of the tour Misterioso Jr., Gedo, Jado lost to Prince Devitt, Ryusuke Taguchi and Tiger Mask. On the second night Misterioso Jr. and Taichi lost to Jushin Thunder Liger and Máximo. He returned with the CMLL contingent the following year for Fantastica Mania 2013, this time a three show tour. On the first night Misterioso Jr. teamed up with NJPW'sShinsuke Nakamura, losing to Hiroshi Tanahashi and La Sombra in the main event of the show.

On November 3, 2016 Misterioso Jr. made his debut for the US based Ring of Honor (ROH) promotion at their Survival of the Fittest double show in Texas. On night one he lost a "Survival of the Fittest" first round tournament to Lio Rush in a match that also included Hangman Page and Sho. On the following night he teamed up with The Tempura Boyz (Sho and Yohey), losing to the team of The Cabinet (Rhett Titus, Kenny King and Caprice Coleman).

== Personal life ==
Misterioso Jr. has two sons who made their professional wrestling debut in early 2020. Both adopted the ring character and mask of their father, competing as Misterioso Negro and Misterio Blanco. He also has a daughter who did the same and became Misteriosa. A second daughter - Zulema - died during childbirth, for which the hospital admitted culpability & financially compensated the family for.

== Championships and accomplishments ==
- Consejo Mundial de Lucha Libre
  - CMLL Arena Coliseo Tag Team Championship (1 time) - with Sagrado
  - Gran Alternativa: 2006 – with Perro Aguayo Jr.
- CMLL Guadalajara
  - Occidente Light Heavyweight Championship (1 time)
- Union Independent Pro Wrestling

- UIPW Heavyweight Championship (1 time, current)

== Luchas de Apuestas record ==
Winner (wager)	Loser (wager)	Location	Event	Date	Notes
Super Spider (mask)	Mr. Bold (hair)	Torreon, Coahuilo	Live event	N/A	
Super Spider (mask)	Blond Furi (hair)	Torreon, Coahuilo	Live event	N/A	
Super Spider (mask)	Flecha Veloz (mask)	Torreon, Coahuilo	Live event	N/A	
Super Spider (mask)	La Amenaza (mask)	Torreon, Coahuilo	Live event	N/A	
Misterioso Jr. (mask)	El Pantera (mask)	Mexico City	CMLL Live event	July 14, 2006	
Misterioso II (mask)	Pioloto Suicida (hair)	Gomez Palacio, Durango	Live event	January 3, 2009	
El Hijo del Santo (mask)	Misterioso Jr. (mask)	Arena Ciudad de Mexico	Live event	April 6, 2025	
