= Shockercito =

Mexican professional wrestler

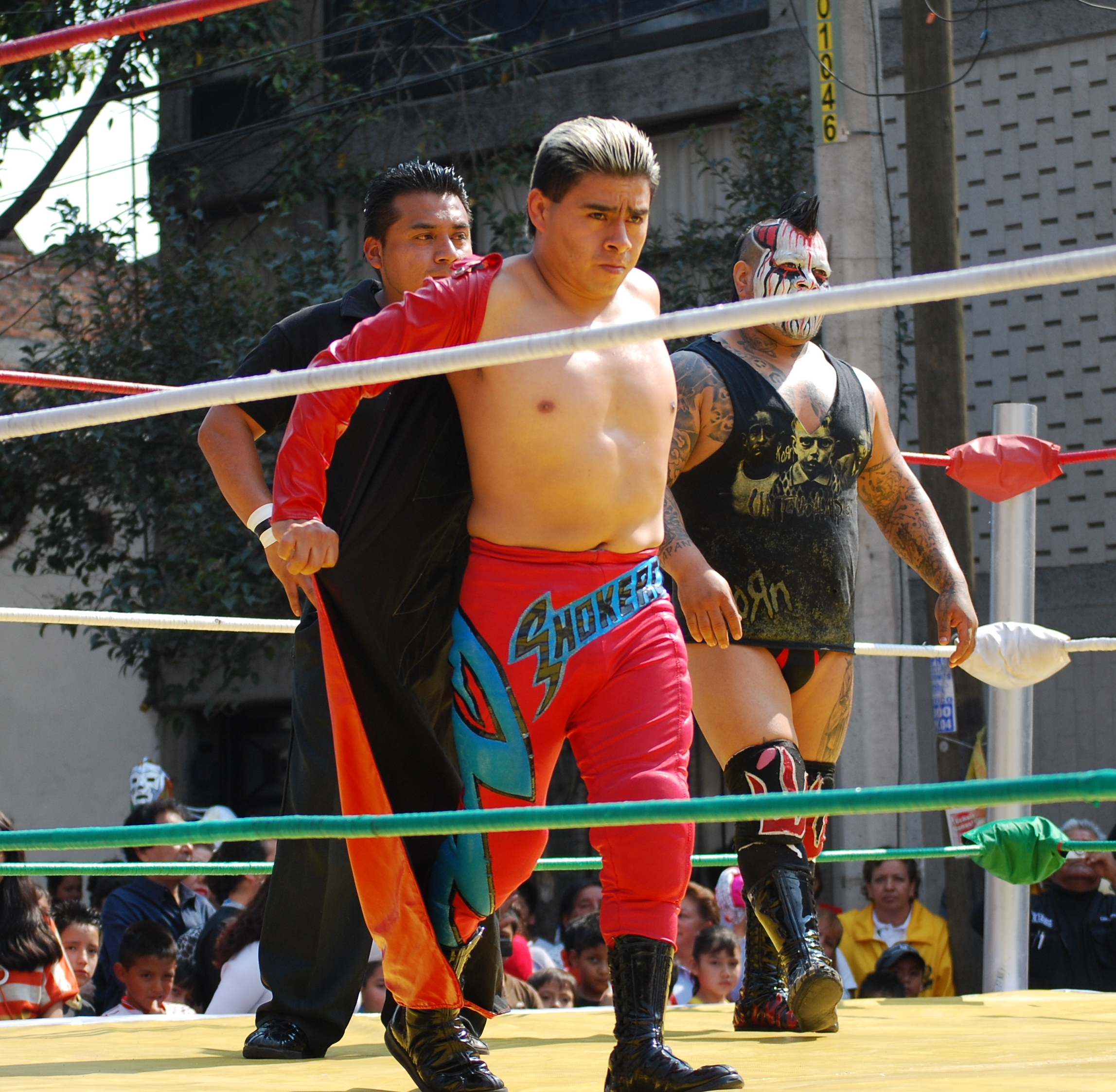
- Shockercito in the ring in January 2013

Personal information
- Born: Javier Cortes Sánchez; December 12, 1980 (age 45) Villa Nueva, Oaxaca, Mexico

Professional wrestling career
- Ring name: Shockercito
- Billed height: 1.30 m (4 ft 3 in)
- Billed weight: 50 kg (110 lb)
- Billed from: Guadalajara, Jalisco, Mexico
- Trained by: José Luis Feliciano; Arturo Beristain
- Debut: May 21, 2002

Javier Cortes Sánchez (born December 12, 1980) is a Mexican professional wrestler who works for Consejo Mundial de Lucha Libre (CMLL) in their Mini-Estrella division. Cortés is better known under the ring name Shockercito, a mascota version of wrestler Shocker. Cortés was originally an masked character, but was forced to unmask after losing a Lucha de Apuesta, or bet match, on January 11, 2009. Working in the Mini division does not necessarily mean that Cortés has dwarfism as several short wrestlers work in the "Mini" division, which is what separates the Mexican Mini-Estrella from traditional Midget wrestling as practiced in the United States among other places.

== Professional wrestling career ==
Javier Cortes made his professional wrestling debut on May 21, 2002, adopting the ring name Shockercito ("Little Shocker") as he began working in Consejo Mundial de Lucha Libre's (CMLL) Mini-Estrella division. As Shockercito he was a mascota version of professional wrestler Shocker and even wore the same mask as Shocker had originally worn before being unmasked. Since Shocker was nicknamed "1000% Guapo" ("1000% Handsome") Shockercito quickly became known as "500% Guapo". Cortes continued to train at CMLL's wrestling school in Mexico City under José Luis Feliciano and Arturo Beristain even after making his in-ring debut. On September 17, 2004, Shockercito wrestled at the CMLL 71st Anniversary Show, CMLL's biggest show of the year, as he teamed up with Mascarita Sagrada and Tzuki to defeat Espectrito, Fire and Pequeño Violencia. This match marked Shockercito's first appearance at a major CMLL show. On January 4, 2008, Shockercito participated in the 2008 Pequeño Reyes del Aire ("Little kings of the air") tournament as part of a 10-Mini-Estrella torneo cibernetico, other participants included Bam Bam, Fantasy, Fire, Mr. Aguilta, Pequeño Damián 666, Pequeño Halloween, Pequeño Black Warrior, Tzuki and tournament winner Mascarita Dorada. In late 2008 CMLL reintroduced the Mexican National Lightweight Championship after it had been vacant since 2005. CMLL a Torneo cibernetico match on September 9, 2008 where the winner would qualify for the final. Shockercito was one of 12 Mini-Estrellas in the match and was the second to last wrestler to be eliminated, defeated by eventual light heavyweight champion Pierrothito.

Shockercito was one of the 13-Mini-Estrellas who put their mask on the line in a Steel Cage "elimination" match at CMLL's La Hora Cero show on January 11, 2009; this was the first time CMLL booked their Mini-Estrellas division in such a cage match. During the match Cosmico, Electrico, Niño de Acero, Fantasy, Mascarita Dorada, Pequeño Ninja, Pequeno Olimpico, Pequeño Black Warrior, Tzuki, Ultimo Dragoncito, and Pequeño Universo 2000 all escaped the cage, leaving only Pierrothito and Shockercito in the cage. The two were forced to wrestled against each other under Lucha de Apuesta, with both of them betting their mask on the outcome of the match. In the end Pierrothito pinned Shockercito, forcing him to unmask after the match and announce both his real name, home town and how long he had been a wrestler, per lucha libre traditions. Following his mask loss Shockercito was on the winning side of the opening match of the 2009 Homenaje a Dos Leyendas show as he, Pequeño Olimpico and Ultimo Dragoncito defeated Pequeño Violencia, Pequeño Black Warrior and Pierrothito, two falls to one. Shockercito kept the momentum on his side as he faced and defeated Fire in a Lucha de Apuesta, hair vs. hair match and watched as Fire was shaved bald after the match. On June 2, 2009, Shockercito wrestled in yet another Lucha de Apuesta match, his third in 2009, and defeated Pequeño Damián 666, winning his second hair match in just over two months. On November 6, 2012, 12 competitors met in a special steel cage match where the loser of the match would be forced to unmask or have his hair shaved completely off. The match was very chaotic, the steel cage broke at one time and saw several wrestlers bleed and others need medical attention due to a number of accidents. Shockercito and Pequeño Black Warrior were the last two wrestlers left in the ring, relatively unscathed because they had stayed away from the cage as much as possible. In the end Shockercito forced Pequeño Black Warrior to submit, ensuring that he had to be shaved bald after the match.

== Championships and accomplishments ==
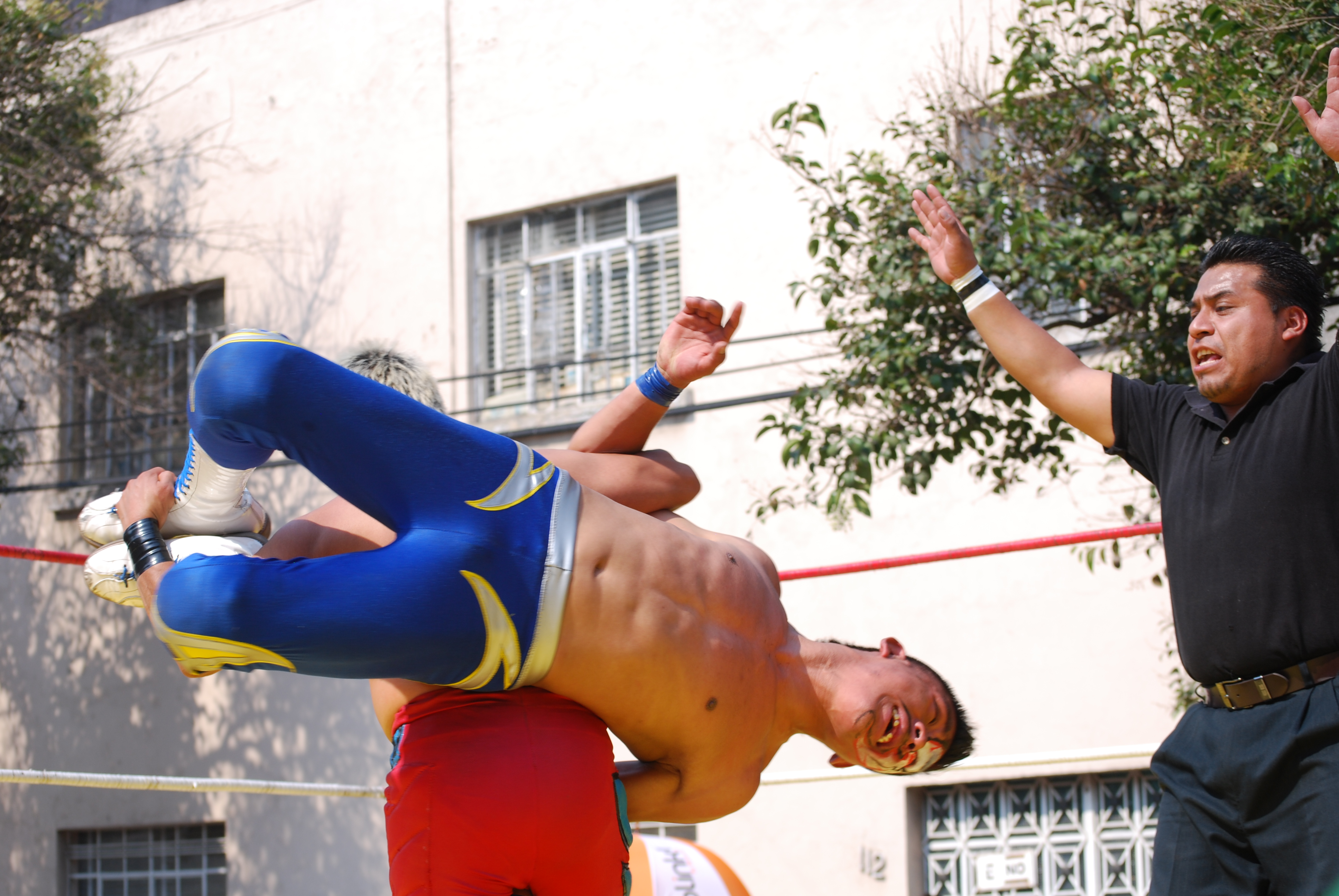
Shockercito performing his Reinera finisher on Mercurio.

- Consejo Mundial de Lucha Libre

- CMLL World Mini-Estrella Championship (1 time)
- Pequeños Reyes del Aire (2015)

== Luchas de Apuestas record ==
Winner (wager)	Loser (wager)	Location	Event	Date	Notes
Pierrothito (mask)	Shockercito (mask)	Mexico City	La Hora Cero	January 11, 2009	(Note: Steel Cage match that also included Mascarita Dorada, Ultimo Dragoncito, Pequeño Black Warrior, Pequeño Universo 2000, Pequeño Olímpico, Pequeño Damián 666, Tzuki, Niño de Acero, Pequeño Ninja, Fantasy, Eléctrico and Cosmico.)
Shockercito (hair)	Fire (hair)	Mexico City	CMLL Live event	April 1, 2009	
Shockercito (hair)	Pequeño Damián 666 (hair)	Mexico City	CMLL Live event	June 2, 2009	
Shockercito (hair)	Pequeño Black Warrior (hair)	Mexico City	CMLL Live event	November 6, 2012	(Note: Steel Cage match that also included Aéreo, Astral, Demus 3:16, Fantasy, Mercurio, Pequeño Halcón, Pequeño Olímpico, Pequeño Violencia, Pierrothito and Último Dragoncito.)
Shockercito (hair)	Pequeño Violencia (hair)	Mexico City	Sin Salida (2013)	June 2, 2013	(Note: 10-man Steel cage elimination match that also included Aéreo, Bam Bam, Demus 3:16, Eléctrico, Fantasy, Mercurio, Pequeño Black Warrior and Pequeño Nitro)
Shockercito (hair)	Demus 3:16 (hair)	Mexico City	CMLL Live event	October 16, 2015	
Mercurio (hair)	Shockercito (hair)	Mexico City	Sin Salida (2024)	January 1, 2024	
