= Santos Escobar =

Mexican professional wrestler (born 1984)

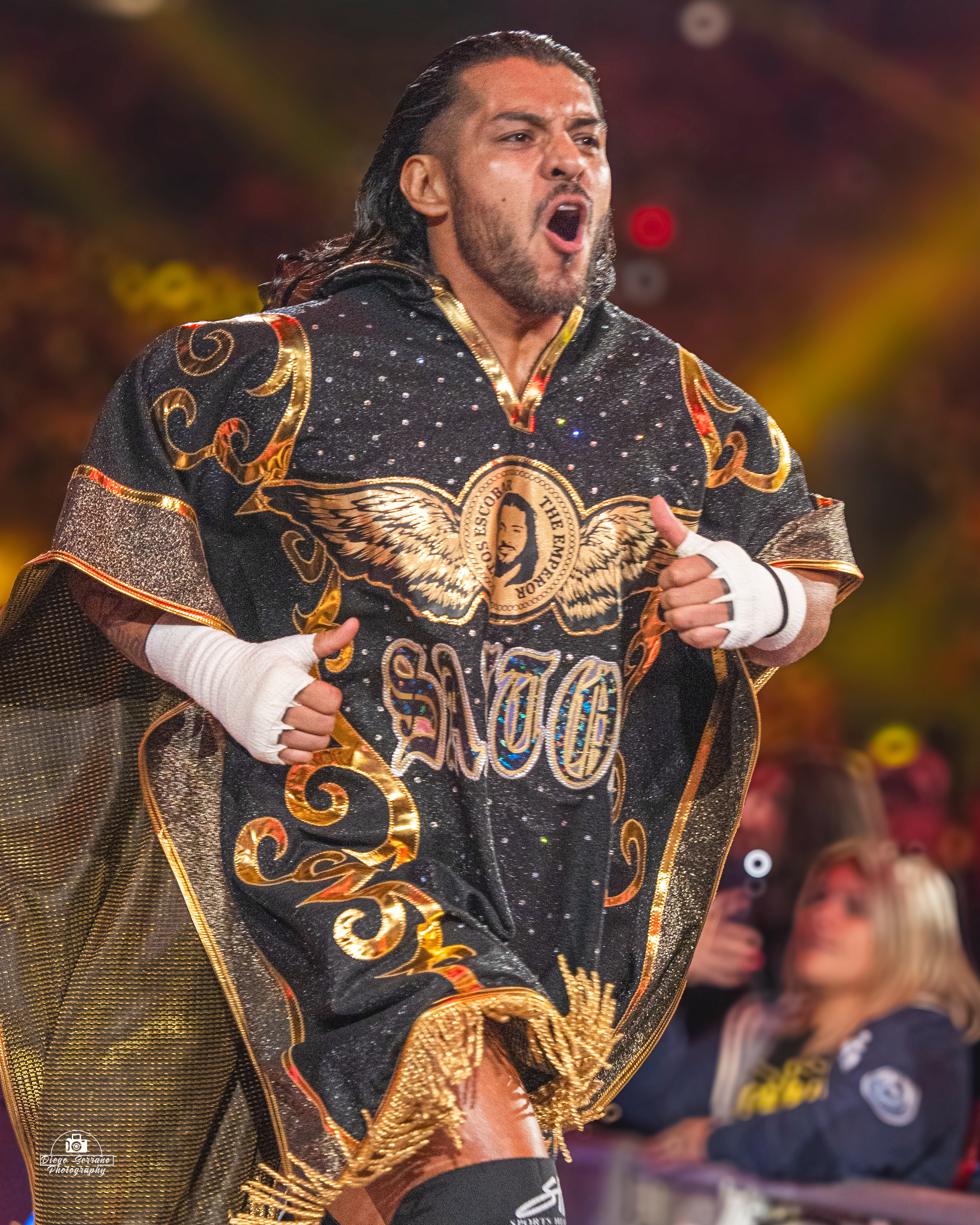
- Escobar in 2025

Personal information
- Born: Jorge Luis Alcantar Bolly; April 30, 1984 (age 42) Mexico City, Mexico
- Children: 1
- Parent: El Fantasma (father)
- Relatives: Fantasma Jr. (cousin); Ángel de la Muerte (uncle)

Professional wrestling career
- Ring name(s): El Hijo del Fantasma; Jorge Bolly; King Cuerno; Romeo Malverde; Santos Escobar; Top Secret
- Billed height: 1.85 m (6 ft 1 in)
- Billed weight: 204 lb (93 kg)
- Billed from: "The Highlands of Guerrero", Mexico; Mexico City, Mexico
- Trained by: Franco Columbo; El Fantasma; El Hijo del Gladiador
- Debut: July 4, 2000

Jorge Luis Alcantar Bolly (born April 30, 1984), is a Mexican professional wrestler. He is performing on the independent circuit under the ring name Romeo Malverde. He is best known for his time in WWE, where he performed under the ring name Santos Escobar.

Before his WWE career, Alcantar began his career in working on the independent circuit as Top Secret. In 2008, Alcantar signed with Consejo Mundial de Lucha Libre (CMLL) as El Hijo del Fantasma, winning the CMLL World Middleweight Championship, as well as the CMLL World Trios Championship twice (with Héctor Garza and La Máscara). He departed CMLL in 2013 and signed with Lucha Libre AAA Worldwide (AAA), where he won the AAA Fusión Championship, the AAA Latin American Championship, the 2017 Copa Antonio Peña, and was previously the longest-reigning AAA World Cruiserweight Champion in history. In 2014, he worked for the U.S.-based Lucha Underground promotion as King Cuerno and briefly worked for Impact Wrestling in 2017 to 2019. He departed AAA in 2019 and signed with WWE. In 2020, he adopted the ring name Santos Escobar, winning the NXT Cruiserweight Championship and forming Legado Del Fantasma.

His father is professional wrestler El Fantasma, who is the head of the Mexico City Boxing and Professional Wrestling commission. His cousin wrestles under the name "Fantasma Jr.", while his uncle worked under the name "Ángel de la Muerte".

== Professional wrestling career ==
=== Early career (2000–2008) ===
Alcantar began his professional wrestling career in 2000, as the masked ring character "Top Secret", wearing a black mask with gold trim around the eye openings. In 2003, Alcantar adopted a new mask and name as he became "El Hijo del Fantasma" (English: "The Son of El Fantasma"), revealing to the wrestling world that he was the son of El Fantasma. After the name change, he began wearing a mask closely resembling that of the comic book character The Phantom, just like his father did before him. His first documented match as El Hijo del Fantasma saw him team up with his father and his cousin, who adopted the ring name "Fantasma Jr.". They defeated Los Oficiales (Guardia, Oficial and Vanguardia) at an International Wrestling Revolution Group (IWRG) show on December 14.

=== Consejo Mundial de Lucha Libre (2008–2013) ===
After leaving IWRG in 2004, Alcantar made his debut for Consejo Mundial de Lucha Libre (CMLL) on April 11, 2008, teaming with La Máscara and Valiente to defeat Ephesto, Misterioso II and Sangre Azteca. On July 31, at Infierno en el Ring ("Inferno in the Ring"), Hijo del Fantasma, Héctor Garza and La Máscara defeated Blue Panther, Dos Caras Jr. and Místico in a tournament final to win the vacant CMLL World Trios Championship, but lost it to Atlantis, Negro Casas and Último Guerrero on August 5. At the CMLL 75th Anniversary Show on September 19, he, La Máscara and Volador Jr. lost to La Triada del Terror (Averno, Ephesto and Mephisto). On January 18, 2009, Hijo del Fantasma, Garza and La Máscara regained the trios title in a rematch. At Homenaje a Dos Leyendas ("Homage to Two Legends") on March 20, they lost to Poder Mexica (Azteca, Dragón Rojo Jr. and Misterioso Jr.) in a non-title match. This led to a successful title defense against the trio on April 3. On July 21, Hijo del Fantasma defeated Averno to win the CMLL World Middleweight Championship. On September 18, he teamed with El Sagrado and Máscara Dorada to defeat Poder Mexica at the CMLL 76th Anniversary Show. On February 14, 2010, after only one successful title defense since July 2009, Hijo del Fantasma lost the middleweight title to Negro Casas.

In March 2010, signs of dissension amongst the trios champions began showing as Garza walked out on the team during a trios match, mistakenly thinking that one of his teammates had attacked him. Following the walk out, Garza kept insincerely insisting that he was still a tecnico and that there was no tension on his team. Further doubts about Garza's allegiance arose when he teamed up with the rúdo Pólvora to win the 2010 Gran Alternativa ("Great Alternative") tournament. When Garza, La Máscara and Hijo del Fantasma were booked for a trios title defense the following week, Garza complained that his partners agreed contesting to the match without asking him, but swore that he would still be professional about it. During the title defense on the May 7 Super Viernes, Garza attacked both Hijo del Fantasma and La Máscara, allowing La Ola Amarilla (Hiroshi Tanahashi, Shigeo Okumura and Taichi Ishikari) to win the CMLL World Trios Championship, turning full blown rúdo in the process. At Sin Piedad ("No Mercy") on December 3, they teamed with La Sombra to defeat Averno, Ephesto and Mephisto.

On January 14, 2011, Hijo del Fantasma unsuccessfully challenged Mephisto for the NWA World Historic Welterweight Championship after he knocked out Fantasma with a pair of brass knuckles. The following month, they were forced to team together for the Torneo Nacional de Parejas Increibles ("National Incredible Pairs Tournament"), a tag team tournament teaming rudos with tecnicos, losing to La Sombra and Misterioso II in the first round. On June 7, as part of a tournament for the vacant NWA World Historic Light Heavyweight Championship, he outlasted Ephesto, La Máscara, Metro, Mr. Águila, Olímpico, Psicosis and Toscano in the semi-final torneo cibernetico to advance to the finals, where he lost to Rey Bucanero on June 21. On July 29, he competed in the Leyenda de Azul ("Blue Legend") tournament, where he eliminated Psicosis with help from former partner Héctor Garza, before being eliminated by Texano Jr. On October 28, 2012, Hijo del Fantasma unsuccessfully challenged Dragón Rojo Jr. for the NWA World Historic Middleweight Championship. He was paired with El Felino for the Torneo Nacional de Parejas Increibles on March 1, 2013, but the team lost to Averno and La Máscara in the first round. On October 15, Hijo del Fantasma wrestled his final match in CMLL, where he, Sagrado and Brazo de Plata lost to Kraneo, Olímpico and Psicosis.

=== Lucha Libre AAA Worldwide (2013–2019) ===
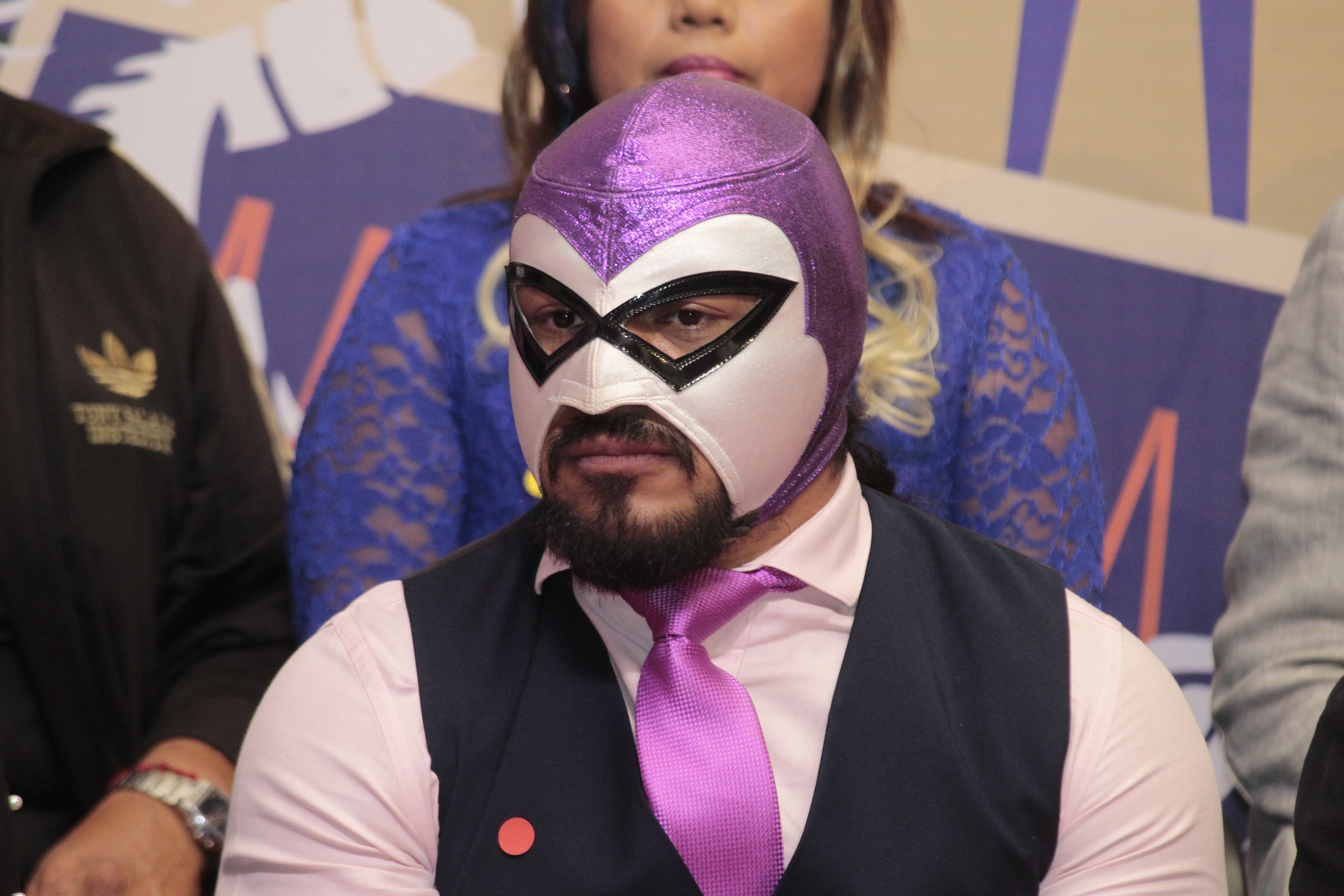
El Hijo del Fantasma at a press conference in 2018

On October 18, 2013, El Hijo del Fantasma made a surprise jump to Lucha Libre AAA Worldwide (AAA) at Héroes Inmortales VII as the newest member of El Consejo, a rúdo stable made up of former CMLL wrestlers. He made it to the finals of the Copa Antonio Peña, before losing to La Parka. On December 8, at Guerra de Titanes, Fantasma and El Consejo stablemates Silver King and Texano Jr. unsuccessfully challenged Los Psycho Circus (Monster Clown, Murder Clown and Psycho Clown) for the AAA World Trios Championship. On August 17, 2014, at Triplemanía XXII, El Hijo del Fantasma won a ten-way elimination match to unify the AAA Fusión and AAA Cruiserweight Championships, becoming the first AAA World Cruiserweight Champion. On October 12, he successfully defended the title in an eight-man ladder match at Héroes Inmortales VIII. He also retained the title against Fénix on March 18, 2015, at Rey de Reyes. At Triplemanía XXIII on August 9, he, alongside Texano Jr. and Pentagón Jr., unsuccessfully challenged Los Hell Brothers (Averno, Chessman and Cibernético) for the trios title in a three-way steel cage match also involving Angélico, Fénix and Jack Evans.

On September 20, El Hijo del Fantasma became the new leader of the La Sociedad stable. At Guerra de Titanes on January 20, 2017, he defeated Garza Jr. to retain the AAA World Cruiserweight Championship, but lost it at Rey de Reyes on March 19 to Johnny Mundo. At Triplemanía XXV on August 26, Fantasma and Texano Jr. were involved in a three-way tables, ladders, and chairs match for Mundo's AAA Mega Championship, AAA Latin American Championship and AAA World Cruiserweight Championship, where Mundo retained all of his titles. On October 1, at Héroes Inmortales XI, Fantasma won the 2017 Copa Antonio Peña tournament, which meant he also earned the now-vacant AAA Latin American Championship. He subsequently became involved in a long running storyline with Texano Jr., initially over the title, which saw El Hijo del Fantasma win a steel cage match by disqualification at Guerra de Titanes on January 26, 2018. After the match, it was announced that the two would face off in a Luchas de Apuestas ("bet match") at Rey de Reyes on March 4, where El Hijo del Fantasma defeated Texano Jr., forcing the latter to have all his hair shaved off as a result.

In the weeks following Rey de Reyes, AAA announced that El Hijo del Fantasma, Psycho Clown, L.A. Park and Pentagón Jr. would all risk their masks in a Poker de Aces (English: "Poker Aces") match at Triplemanía XXVI. In the build-up to Triplemanía XXVI, El Hijo del Fantasma turned rudo once more, forming a faction known as Los Mercenarios ("The Mercenaries") with Texano Jr., Rey Escorpión and La Máscara. At Triplemanía XXVI on August 26, L.A. Park defeated El Hijo del Fantasma in the Poker de Aces match. After his loss, El Hijo del Fantasma was forced to unmask and reveal his real name, Jorge Luis Alcantar Bolly, to everyone watching. On December 12, El Hijo del Fantasma lost the AAA Latin American Championship to Drago at Guerra de Titanes. On March 20, 2019, Fantasma announced his departure from AAA.

=== Lucha Underground (2014–2019) ===
In September 2014, Hijo del Fantasma began working for Lucha Underground under the ring name "King Cuerno" (Spanish for "King Antler" or "King Horn"), a "big game" hunter. He started a feud with Drago, defeating him in a Last Man Standing match on January 21, 2015. His next rivalry was with Johnny Mundo, whom he lost to in a steel cage match on the March 11 episode. On November 14, King Cuerno defeated Fénix to win the Gift of the Gods Championship, but lost the title back to Fénix in a ladder match on November 21.

At Ultima Lucha Dos, King Cuerno was defeated by Mil Muertes in a deathmatch. He was not seen in season three of the series until the finale Ultima Lucha Tres, where he attacked Mil Muertes and stole the gauntlet that was contested for by Muertes, Jeremiah Crane and Brian Cage. The storyline started at the end of season 3 and continued into season 4, with King Cuerno and Muertes receiving a double disqualification on September 12, 2018. A week later, the feud between King Cuerno and Muertes distracted both wrestlers from their match, allowing Pentagón Dark (previously known as Pentagón Jr.) to successfully defend the Lucha Underground Championship against the two. The rivalry between the two ended inconclusively in a match where Pentagón Dark defeated King Cuerno, Mil Muertes and El Dragon Azeca Jr. on September 26. He was released from his contract on March 26, 2019.

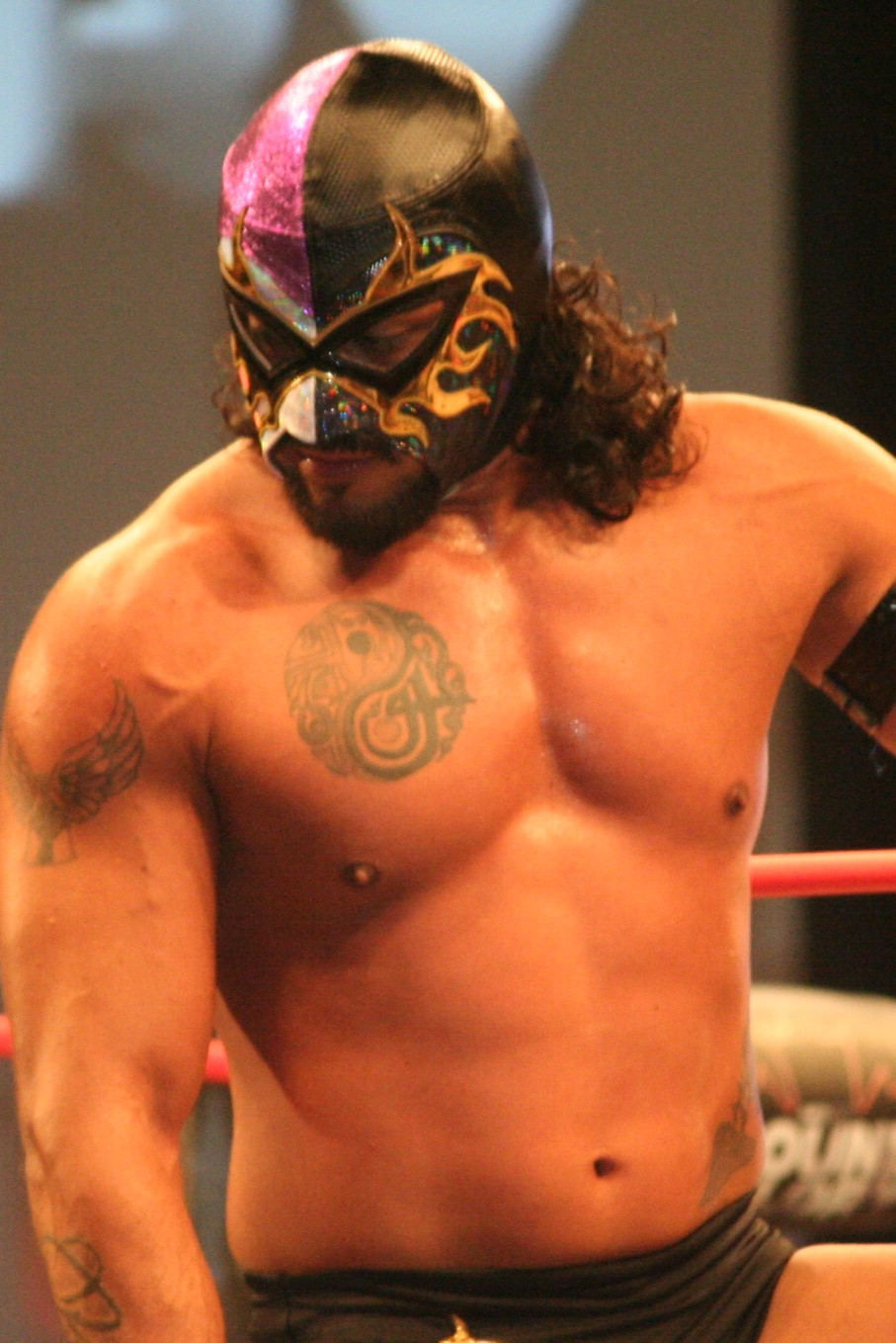
El Hijo del Fantasma at Bound for Glory in 2017

=== Impact Wrestling (2017–2018) ===
On July 2, 2017, El Hijo del Fantasma, representing AAA, made his Impact Wrestling debut at Slammiversary XV, where he and Drago failed to win a fatal four-way match for The Latin American Xchange's (Santana and Ortiz) Impact Wrestling World Tag Team Championship and GFW Tag Team Championship; it also included the teams of Laredo Kid and Garza Jr. and Naomichi Marufuji and Taiji Ishimori. At Bound for Glory on November 5, Team AAA (Hijo del Fantasma, Pagano and Texano) lost to Team Impact (Ethan Carter III, Eddie Edwards and James Storm) in a six-man tag team match. The next day, he unsuccessfully challenged Edwards for the GHC Heavyweight Championship. At Impact Wrestling Redemption on April 22, 2018, he competed in a six-way match which was won by Brian Cage. Following the event, Hijo del Fantasma defeated Aero Star, Drago and Taiji Ishimori in a four-way match to become the number one contender for the Impact X Division Championship, but failed to win the title from champion Matt Sydal.

=== WWE (2019–2026) ===
==== NXT (2019–2022) ====
On August 14, 2019, Alcantar signed a contract with WWE, which was publicly acknowledged on September 4. During one of the first weeks while training at the WWE Performance Center, Alcantar suffered a knee injury that prevented him from wrestling for several months. He made his in-ring debut under his real name for NXT on February 15, 2020, teaming with Raul Mendoza to defeat Lewis Howley and Sam Stoker at a live event in Fort Pierce, Florida. On April 12, he was announced as a participant in the interim NXT Cruiserweight Championship tournament under his El Hijo del Fantasma ring name, representing Group B. This led to his televised debut on NXT ten days later, where he defeated Jack Gallagher, but was attacked by two masked men after the match. Despite losing to Isaiah "Swerve" Scott, Fantasma defeated Akira Tozawa to make it to the finals, where he defeated Drake Maverick to win the Cruiserweight Championship, his first championship in WWE. On the June 10 episode of NXT, Fantasma joined forces with the masked men, who revealed themselves to be Joaquin Wilde and Raul Mendoza. After attacking Maverick, Fantasma unmasked himself and adopted the new ring name of Santos Escobar, establishing himself as a heel in the process. The group was later named Legado Del Fantasma.

Escobar successfully defended the Cruiserweight Championship against Scott on the August 26 episode of NXT and at NXT TakeOver 31 on October 4. At NXT: New Years Evil on January 6, 2021, Escobar retained the title against Gran Metalik. On the March 18 episode of NXT, Jordan Devlin, the original Cruiserweight Champion, who was unable to defend his title due to the COVID-19 pandemic, challenged Escobar to a match at NXT TakeOver: Stand & Deliver to determine the undisputed Cruiserweight Champion. At the event on April 8, Escobar defeated Devlin in a ladder match. He lost the title to Kushida in an open challenge on the April 13 episode of NXT, ending his reign at 321 days, and failed to regain the title in a two out of three falls match on the May 11 episode of NXT. At NXT TakeOver: In Your House on June 13, Legado del Fantasma lost to NXT North American Champion Bronson Reed and NXT Tag Team Champions MSK (Nash Carter and Wes Lee) in a winners take all six-man tag team match. In August, Elektra Lopez became a member of Legado del Fantasma after helping them win a six-man tag team match against Hit Row (Scott, Ashante "Thee" Adonis and Top Dolla).

At Vengeance Day on February 15, 2022, Escobar unsuccessfully challenged Bron Breakker for the NXT Championship, despite interference from Dolph Ziggler. At NXT Stand & Deliver on April 2, Escobar failed to win the NXT North American Championship in a ladder match. Legado del Fantasma then feuded with Tony D'Angelo and The D'Angelo Family (Channing "Stacks" Lorenzo and Troy "Two Dimes" Donovan), with Escobar defeating D'Angelo on the May 17 episode of NXT. However, at NXT In Your House on June 4, Legado del Fantasma lost to The D'Angelo Family and, as per stipulation, were forced to join the group. At NXT The Great American Bash on July 5, it was revealed that Escobar was hospitalized and the other Legado del Fantasma members of Legado began working with The D'Angelo Family. On the August 2 episode of NXT, Escobar returned to cost D'Angelo and Stacks their tag team championship match against The Creed Brothers, signaling the end of their alliance. The feud culminated at NXT Heatwave on August 16, where Escobar lost to D'Angelo in a Street Fight, barring him from NXT.

==== Latino World Order (2022–2023) ====
Escobar made his main roster debut on the October 7 episode of SmackDown, where he, Wilde and Del Toro, alongside Zelina Vega, attacked Hit Row during their entrance. He participated in the SmackDown World Cup to determine the number one contender for the Intercontinental Championship, defeating Shinsuke Nakamura in the first round and Butch in the semi-finals, before losing to Ricochet in the finals on the December 2 episode of SmackDown. At the Royal Rumble on January 28, 2023, Escobar entered his first Royal Rumble match at number 10, but was eliminated by Brock Lesnar. On February 10, during an off-air exclusive uploaded to WWE's YouTube channel, Escobar approached Rey Mysterio and thanked him for inspiring him as a wrestler, gifting him a mask of his own. Escobar then received a mask from Mysterio in return. Escobar and Legado Del Fantasma then assisted Rey in his feud against his son, Dominik Mysterio, turning face in the process. On the March 3 episode of SmackDown, Escobar lost to Dominik after interference from his Judgment Day stablemate Rhea Ripley. After the match, Dominik tore up the mask Rey gave to Escobar, solidifying Escobar's face turn.

On the March 31 episode of SmackDown, Rey reformed the Latino World Order and invited Legado Del Fantasma to join as a token of appreciation for aiding him in the feud. Escobar competed in the Money in the Bank ladder match at the namesake event on July 1, which was won by Damian Priest. On the July 28 episode of SmackDown, he defeated Rey in the finals of the United States Championship Invitational tournament after Rey suffered an injury, earning a title match against champion Austin Theory. On the August 11 episode of SmackDown, Escobar was attacked by Theory before the match started, rendering him unable to compete. Rey took Escobar's place and subsequently defeated Theory to become the new United States Champion. On the September 29 episode of SmackDown, Escobar unsuccessfully challenged Rey for the title. After the match, they were attacked by The Street Profits (Angelo Dawkins and Montez Ford). At Fastlane on October 7, Escobar, Rey and the returning Carlito defeated Bobby Lashley and The Street Profits in a six-man tag team match.

==== New Legado Del Fantasma (2023–2026) ====
At Crown Jewel on November 4, Escobar accidentally cost Rey the United States Championship after snatching away brass knuckles from a member of Logan Paul's entourage and left it on the ring while chasing off Paul's entourage, allowing Paul to use it on Rey to win the title. On the November 10 episode of SmackDown, Escobar was accused by Carlito, the newest member of the LWO, for leaving the brass knuckles on the ring. After Carlito's match with Lashley, Escobar attacked Rey as he was checking on Carlito, turning heel and leaving the LWO. The following week, he kicked out Vega, Wilde and Del Toro from Legado del Fantasma. Escobar was set to face Carlito at Survivor Series: WarGames on November 25, but injured Carlito's arm the day before the event, leading to Dragon Lee replacing him; Escobar won the match. On the December 8 episode of SmackDown, Escobar defeated Lee in the first round of a tournament to determine the number one contender for the United States Championship at the Royal Rumble.

In the semi-finals, Escobar defeated Lashley after interference from Los Lotharios (Angel Garza and Humberto Carrillo), who aligned with Escobar. He lost to Kevin Owens in the finals at SmackDown: New Year's Revolution on January 5, 2024. The newly revived Legado del Fantasma defeated Carlito, Wilde and Del Toro on the January 19 episode of SmackDown. The following week, Elektra Lopez reunited with Escobar and returned to Legado del Fantasma. Escobar entered the Royal Rumble match at number 7 on January 27, but was eliminated by Carlito. Following the event, Escobar continued his feud with Rey, defeating him on the March 22 episode of SmackDown after interference from Dominik Mysterio. At WrestleMania XL Night 1 on April 6, Escobar and Dominik lost to Rey and Andrade after interference from Jason Kelce and Lane Johnson. On the August 9 episode of SmackDown, Escobar defeated Andrade to become the number one contender for the United States Championship, but failed to defeat LA Knight for the title on the August 23 and November 22 episodes of SmackDown.

On June 7, 2025, at Worlds Collide, Legado del Fantasma defeated El Hijo de Dr. Wagner Jr., Pagano and Psycho Clown. Escobar was set to leave WWE when his contract expired on October 7. However, the following day, it was reported that Escobar had re-signed a new deal. He made his return to AAA (now the sister promotion to WWE) on the January 17, 2026 episode of AAA on Fox, attacking El Hijo de Dr Wagner Jr. On the March 7 episode, Escobar defeated Abismo Negro Jr., Mr. Iguana and Psycho Clown to qualify for the Rey de Reyes tournament final on March 14 at the titular event, which was won by El Grande Americano; it was also Escobar's final WWE/AAA match. After the event, it was reported that Escobar had suffered a torn tricep and would be out of action. On April 24, Escobar departed WWE ending his seven-year tenure with the company.

=== Independent circuit (2026–present) ===
On Septemeber 27, 2026, Alcantar, under the name Romeo Malverde, made his first post-WWE appearance at the 5th International Lucha Libre Festival in Ciudad Juarez, teaming with Blue Demon Jr. to defeat Magno and Steven Juarez.

== Films ==
El Hijo del Fantasma has appeared in the following films:

- El Fantasma Vs La Maldición de la Pirámide ("The Phantom Vs The Curse of the Pyramid") (2007)
- El Fantasma Vs La Aldea de los Zoombies ("The Phantom Vs The Village of the Zombies") (2007)
- El Fantasma Vs El Secreto de la Urna Maldita ("The phantom vs the secret of the cursed urn") (2008)

== Personal life ==
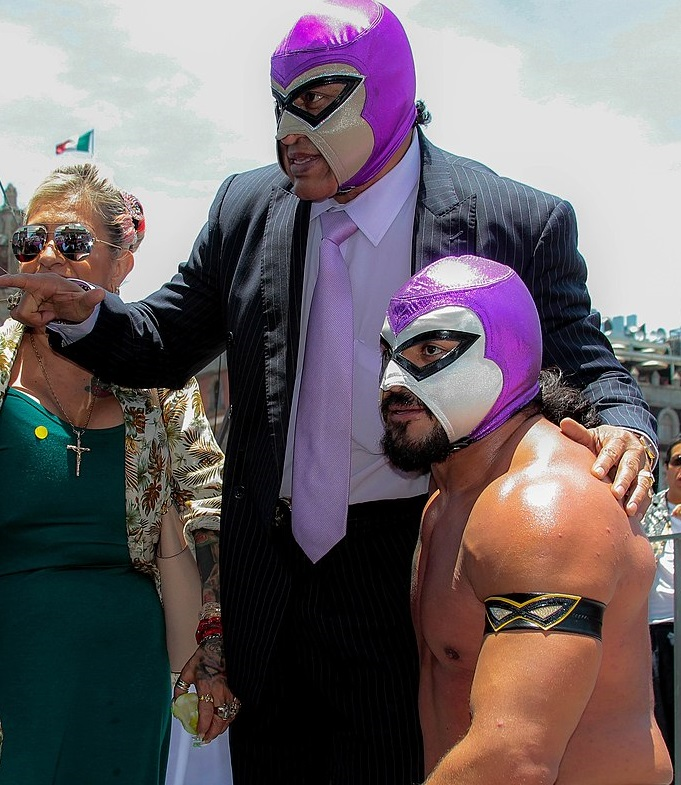
Alcantar and his father at a 2018 show.

Jorge Luis Alcantar Bolly was born on April 30, 1984, in Mexico City, Mexico. His father was a professional wrestler, known as the enmascarado "El Fantasma". His uncle was also a professional wrestler, known as Ángel de la Muerte (English: "Angel of Death") and his cousin has worked under the names Ángel de la Muerte Jr. and then Fantasma Jr. In 2007, it was revealed that Alcantar was a student at Universidad Anahuac, working on a degree in International Relations at that time. Alcantar was accompanied by his son for the Triplemanía XXVI match and was seen in the ring afterward as Alcantar was forced to remove his mask.

=== Lawsuit against Lucha Underground ===
On February 6, 2019, it was reported that Alcantar had filed a lawsuit in California against El Rey Network and the production company Baba-G, who were behind Lucha Underground. The lawsuit claimed the Lucha Underground contract "Illegally restricted" wrestlers from working in their "lawful profession" by restricting them from working for other companies while under contract with Lucha Underground, which only paid per match. Alcantar's lawyer also revealed that he had filed a class action lawsuit against Lucha Underground over the contracts that he claims are not legal under Californian law. The class action lawsuit also included Ivelisse Vélez, Joey Ryan and Melissa Cervantes looking to invalidate their contracts. The lawsuit led to Alcantar and others being released from their Lucha Underground contracts prior to it expiring.

== Other media ==
Santos Escobar made his video game debut in WWE SuperCard and made appearances in WWE 2K22, WWE 2K23 WWE 2K24., WWE 2K25, and WWE 2K26.

== Championships and accomplishments ==
- Chris Jericho's Rock 'N' Wrestling Rager at Sea
  - Jericho Cruise Oceanic Championship (1 time, current)
  - Jericho Cruise Oceanic Championship #1 Contendership Tournament (2026)
- Consejo Mundial de Lucha Libre
  - CMLL World Trios Championship (2 times) – with Héctor Garza and La Mascara
  - CMLL World Middleweight Championship (1 time)
  - Torneo Generación 75
  - CMLL World Trios Championship Tournament (2008) – with Hector Garza and La Mascara
  - CMLL Trio of the year: 2009 (with Héctor Garza and La Máscara)
- Lucha Libre AAA Worldwide
  - AAA Fusión Championship (1 time)
  - AAA Latin American Championship (1 time)
  - AAA World Cruiserweight Championship (1 time)
  - Copa Antonio Peña (2017)
  - Copa La Polar (2017)
- Lucha Underground
  - Lucha Underground Gift of the Gods Championship (1 time)
- Pro Wrestling Illustrated
  - PWI ranked him #63 of the top 500 singles wrestlers in the PWI 500 in 2015
- Toryumon Mexico
  - Yamaha Cup (2010) – with Angélico
- WWE
  - NXT Cruiserweight Championship (1 time)
  - Interim NXT Cruiserweight Championship Tournament (2020)
  - WWE United States Championship Invitational (2023)

== Luchas de Apuestas record ==
Winner (wager)	Loser (wager)	Location	Event	Date	Notes
Hijo del Fantasma and El Gallo (masks)	Máscara Mágica and Malefico (hair)	Guadalajara, Jalisco, Mexico	CMLL live event	September 28, 2008	
El Hijo del Fantasma (mask)	Texano Jr. (hair)	Mexico City, Mexico	Rey de Reyes	March 4, 2018	
L.A. Park (mask)	El Hijo del Fantasma (mask)	Mexico City, Mexico	Triplemanía XXVI	August 26, 2018	(Note: This was a Poker de Ases four-way Steel cage match that also involved Psycho Clown and Pentagón Jr.)
