= CMLL 75th Anniversary Show =

CMLL 75th Anniversary show
- Official poster for the event
- Promotion: Consejo Mundial de Lucha Libre
- Date: September 19, 2008
- City: Mexico City, Mexico
- Venue: Arena Mexico
- Attendance: 17,500

Event chronology
← Previous; Sin Piedad	Next → Leyenda de Azul

CMLL Anniversary Shows chronology
← Previous; 74th Anniversary	Next → 76th Anniversary

The CMLL 75th Anniversary Show (Spanish: 75. Aniversario de CMLL) was a professional wrestling major show event produced by Consejo Mundial de Lucha Libre (CMLL) that took place on September 19, 2008, in Arena Mexico, Mexico City, Mexico. The event commemorated the 75th anniversary of CMLL, the oldest professional wrestling promotion. in the world. The anniversary show is CMLL's biggest show of the year, their Super Bowl event. The CMLL Anniversary Show series is the longest-running annual professional wrestling show, starting in 1934.

The show consisted of six matches, with the main event being a Lucha de Apuestas, mask vs. mask match between Blue Panther and Villano V. It also featured four regular Six-man tag team matches, including a CMLL World Trios Championship defense and a singles match between Dr. Wagner Jr. and L.A. Park.

== Production ==
=== Background ===
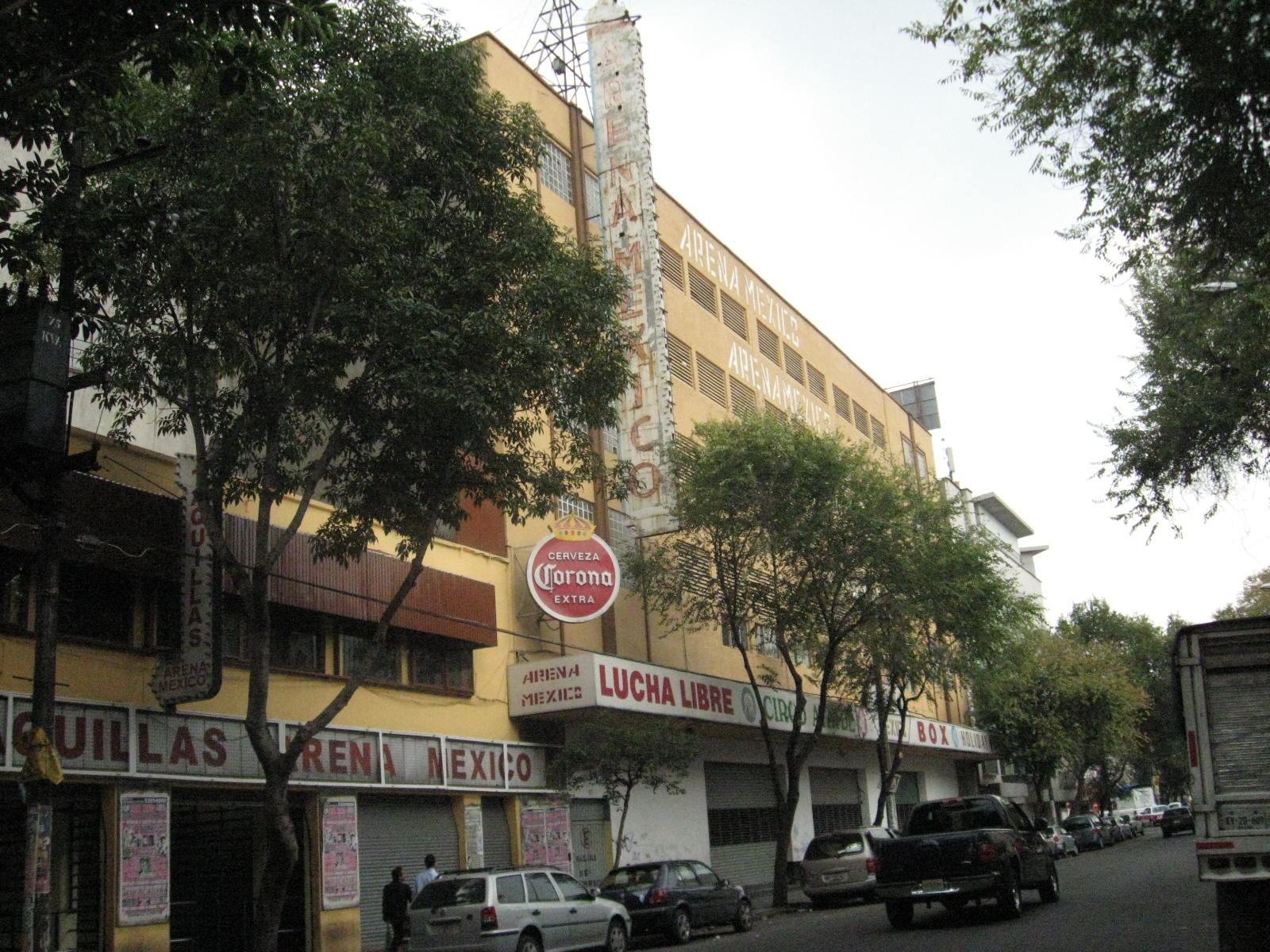
Arena México, CMLL's main venue and location of the Anniversary Show

The Mexican Lucha libre (professional wrestling) company Consejo Mundial de Lucha Libre (CMLL) started out under the name Empresa Mexicana de Lucha Libre ("Mexican Wrestling Company"; EMLL), founded by Salvador Lutteroth in 1933. Lutteroth, inspired by professional wrestling shows he had attended in Texas, decided to become a wrestling promoter and held his first show on September 21, 1933, marking what would be the beginning of organized professional wrestling in Mexico. Lutteroth would later become known as "the father of Lucha Libre" . A year later EMLL held the EMLL 1st Anniversary Show, starting the annual tradition of the Consejo Mundial de Lucha Libre Anniversary Shows that have been held each year ever since, most commonly in September.

Over the years the anniversary show would become the biggest show of the year for CMLL, akin to the Super Bowl for the National Football League (NFL) or WWE's WrestleMania event. The first anniversary show was held in Arena Modelo, which Lutteroth had bought after starting EMLL. In 1942–43 Lutteroth financed the construction of Arena Coliseo, which opened in April 1943. The EMLL 10th Anniversary Show was the first of the anniversary shows to be held in Arena Coliseo. In 1956 Lutteroth had Arena México built in the location of the original Arena Modelo, making Arena México the main venue of EMLL from that point on. Starting with the EMLL 23rd Anniversary Show, all anniversary shows except for the EMLL 46th Anniversary Show have been held in the arena that would become known as "The Cathedral of Lucha Libre". On occasion EMLL held more than one show labelled as their "Anniversary" show, such as two 33rd Anniversary Shows in 1966. Over time the anniversary show series became the oldest, longest-running annual professional wrestling show. In comparison, WWE's WrestleMania is only the fourth oldest still promoted show (CMLL's Arena Coliseo Anniversary Show and Arena México anniversary shows being second and third). EMLL was supposed to hold the EMLL 52nd Anniversary Show on September 20, 1985, but Mexico City was hit by a magnitude 8.0 earthquake. EMLL canceled the event both because of the general devastation but also over fears that Arena México might not be structurally sound after the earthquake.

When Jim Crockett Promotions was bought by Ted Turner in 1988 EMLL became the oldest still active promotion in the world. In 1991 EMLL was rebranded as "Consejo Mundial de Lucha Libre" and thus held the CMLL 59th Anniversary Show, the first under the new name, on September 18, 1992. Traditionally CMLL holds their major events on Friday Nights, replacing their regularly scheduled Super Viernes show.

=== Storylines ===
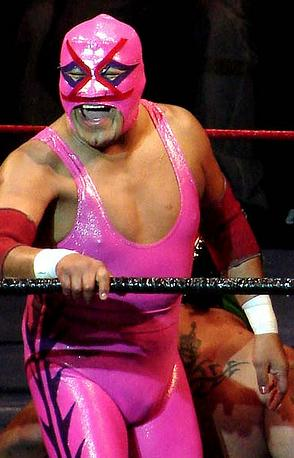
Villano V, who risked his mask on the outcome of the main event

The event featured six professional wrestling matches with different wrestlers involved in pre-existing scripted feuds, plots and storylines. Wrestlers were portrayed as either heels (referred to as rudos in Mexico, those that portray the "bad guys") or faces (técnicos in Mexico, the "good guy" characters) as they followed a series of tension-building events, which culminated in a wrestling match or series of matches.

Due to an injury CMLL's most popular tecnico Místico was not booked to wrestle on the show, only appearing as the corner man for Blue Panther in the main event. Panther's opponent Villano V would be accompanied by Perro Aguayo Jr., Místico's longtime rival. With Místico's injury CMLL was not able to book a match for the CMLL World Tag Team Championship despite repeated challenges by La Peste Negra (Negro Casas teaming with either Heavy Metal or Mr. Niebla). Instead they announced that Mr. Niebla and Heavy Metal would team up with Lizmark Jr. to face half of the tag team champions, Héctor Garza, teaming with Dos Caras Jr. and Marco Corleone in the third match of the night.

== Results ==
No.	Results	Stipulations	Times
1	Los Perros del Mal (Mr. Águila, Damián 666 and El Texano Jr.) defeated Alex Koslov, La Sombra and Máximo	Six-man "Lucha Libre rules" tag team match	17:33
2	Los Hijos del Averno (Averno, Mephisto and Ephesto) defeated El Hijo del Fantasma, La Máscara and Volador Jr.	Six-man "Lucha Libre rules" tag team match	16:45
3	Dos Caras Jr., Héctor Garza and Marco Corleone defeated Heavy Metal, Lizmark Jr. and Mr. Niebla	Six-man "Lucha Libre rules" tag team match	17:00
4	Dr. Wagner Jr. defeated L.A. Park by disqualification.	Singles match	20:15
5	Los Guerreros Negro (Atlantis, Negro Casas and Último Guerrero) (c) defeated Sonjay Dutt and The Motor City Machineguns (Chris Sabin and Alex Shelley)	Six-man "Lucha Libre rules" tag team match for the CMLL World Trios Championship	18:31
6	Villano V defeated Blue Panther	Lucha de Apuestas mask vs. mask match.	21:10
(c) / – the champion(s) heading into the match
