= Homenaje a Dos Leyendas (2009) =

Mexican professional wrestling supercard show

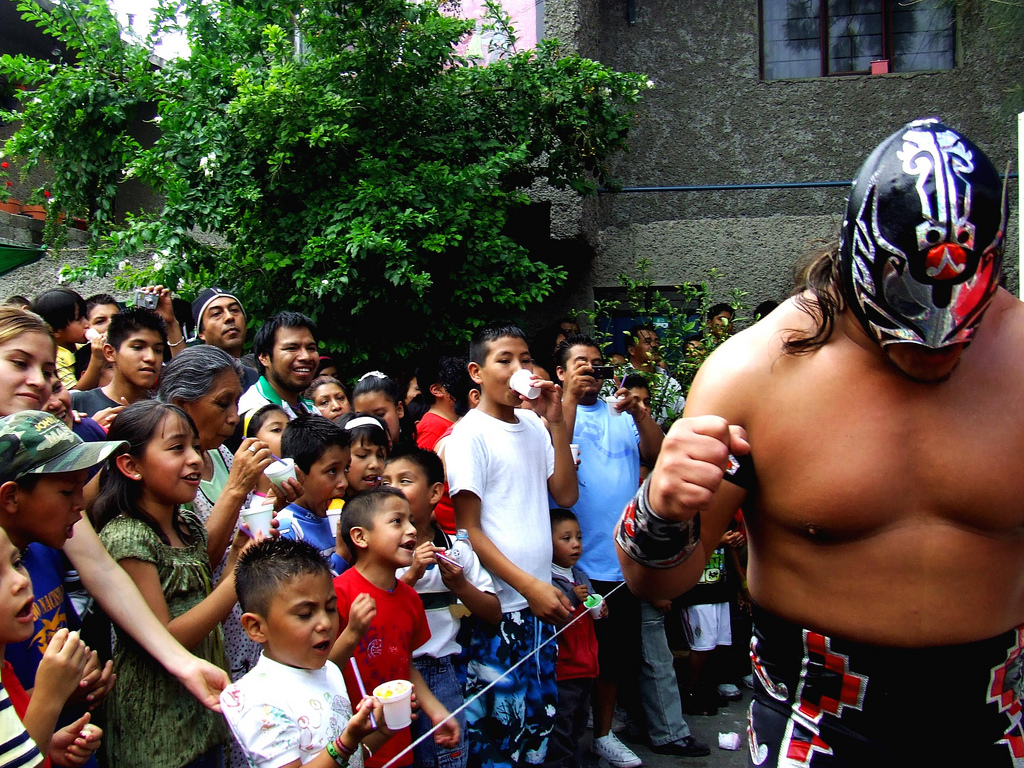
- Último Guerrero, won the main event Luchas de Apuestas match
- Promotion: Consejo Mundial de Lucha Libre
- Date: March 20, 2009
- City: Mexico City, Mexico
- Venue: Arena México

Pay-per-view chronology
← Previous; Torneo Tanque Dantes	Next →: 53. Aniversario de Arena México

Homenaje a Dos Leyendas chronology
← Previous; 2008	Next → 2010

Homenaje a Dos Leyendas (2009) (Spanish for "Homage to Two Legends") was a professional wrestling supercard show event, scripted and produced by Consejo Mundial de Lucha Libre (CMLL; "World Wrestling Council"). The Dos Leyendas show took place on March 20, 2009 in CMLL's main venue, Arena México, Mexico City, Mexico. The event was to honor and remember CMLL founder Salvador Lutteroth, who died in March 1987. Starting in 1999 CMLL honored not just their founder during the show, but also a second lucha libre legend, making it their version of a Hall of Fame event. For the 2009 show CMLL commemorated the life and career of wrestler Cavernario Galindo. This was the 11th March show held under the Homenaje a Dos Leyendas name, having previously been known as Homenaje a Salvador Lutteroth from 1996 to 1998.

The headliner match of the 2009 Dos Leyendas show was a Lucha de Apuestas, or "bet match", where both wrestlers put their mask on the line. Último Guerrero defeated Villano V, two falls to one, to win the match. Afterwards Villano V unmasked and revealed his birth name, Raymundo Díaz Mendoza Jr. In the semi-main event Negro Casas defeated Místico to win the CMLL World Welterweight Championship. The event featured four additional six-man tag team matches, including a Mini-Estrellas match.

== Production ==
=== Background ===
Since 1996 the Mexican wrestling company Consejo Mundial de Lucha Libre (Spanish for "World Wrestling Council"; CMLL) has held a show in March each year to commemorate the passing of CMLL founder Salvador Lutteroth who died in March 1987. For the first three years the show paid homage to Lutteroth himself, from 1999 through 2004 the show paid homage to Lutteroth and El Santo, Mexico's most famous wrestler ever and from 2005 forward the show has paid homage to Lutteroth and a different leyenda ("Legend") each year, celebrating the career and accomplishments of past CMLL stars. Originally billed as Homenaje a Salvador Lutteroth, it has been held under the Homenaje a Dos Leyendas ("Homage to two legends") since 1999 and is the only show outside of CMLL's Anniversary shows that CMLL has presented every year since its inception. All Homenaje a Dos Leyendas shows have been held in Arena México in Mexico City, Mexico, which is CMLL's main venue, its "home". Traditionally CMLL holds their major events on Friday Nights, which means the Homenaje a Dos Leyendas shows replace their regularly scheduled Super Viernes show. The 2009 show was the 14th overall Homenaje a Dos Leyendas show.

=== Storylines ===
The Homenaje a Dos Leyendas show featured six professional wrestling matches with different wrestlers involved in pre-existing scripted feuds, plots and storylines. Wrestlers were portrayed as either heels (referred to as rudos in Mexico, those that portray the "bad guys") or faces (técnicos in Mexico, the "good guy" characters) as they followed a series of tension-building events, which culminated in a wrestling match or series of matches.

=== Homage to Salvador Lutteroth and Cavernario Galindo ===
In September 1933 Salvador Lutteroth González founded Empresa Mexicana de Lucha Libre (EMLL), which would later be renamed Consejo Mundial de Lucha Libre. Over time Lutteroth would become responsible for building both Arena Coliseo in Mexico City and Arena Mexico, which became known as "The Cathedral of Lucha Libre". Over time EMLL became the oldest wrestling promotion in the world, with 2018 marking the 85th year of its existence. Lutteroth has often been credited with being the "father of Lucha Libre", introducing the concept of masked wrestlers to Mexico as well as the Luchas de Apuestas match. Lutteroth died on September 5, 1987. EMLL, late CMLL, remained under the ownership and control of the Lutteroth family as first Salvador's son Chavo Lutteroth and later his grandson Paco Alonso took over ownership of the company.

The life and achievements of Salvador Lutteroth is always honored at the annual Homenaje a Dos Leyenda' show and since 1999 CMLL has also honored a second person, a Leyenda of lucha libre, in some ways CMLL's version of their Hall of Fame. For the 2009 show CMLL commemorated the life and career of Rodolfo Galindo Ramirez, known under the ring name Cavernario Galindo (Spanish for "Caveman Galindo"). Galindo was active from 1938 until the 1990s, when he was in his seventies. Cavernario was known for his wild, brawling wrestling style that often saw him or his opponent, or both, bleeding at the end of a match. His long running storyline feud with Gory Guerrero featured several blood soaked brawls. He won the Mexican National Light Heavyweight Championship and was inducted into the Wrestling Observer Newsletter Hall of Fame in the Class of 1996.

== Results ==
No.	Results	Stipulations	Times
1	Pequeño Olímpico, Shockercito and Último Dragóncito defeated Pequeño Violencia, Pequeño Black Warrior and Pierrothito	Best two-out-of-three falls six-man "Lucha Libre rules" tag team match	07:05
2	Los Hijos del Averno (Averno, Ephesto and Mephisto) defeated Blue Panther, El Sagrado and Toscano	Best two-out-of-three falls six-man "Lucha Libre rules" tag team match	9:45
3	Poder Mexica (Sangre Azteca, Dragón Rojo Jr. and Misterioso Jr.) defeated El Hijo del Fantasma, Héctor Garza and La Máscara	Best two-out-of-three falls six-man "Lucha Libre rules" tag team match	08:15
4	Dos Caras Jr., Shocker and Volador Jr. defeated Mr. Niebla and Los Guerreros del Atlantida (Atlantis and Rey Bucanero)	Best two-out-of-three falls six-man "Lucha Libre rules" tag team match	10:46
5	Negro Casas defeated Místico (c)	Best two-out-of-three falls for the CMLL World Welterweight Championship	23:37
6	Último Guerrero defeated Villano V	Best two-out-of-three falls, Lucha de Apuestas, mask vs. mask match.	12:05
(c) / – the champion(s) heading into the match
