= Sangre Azteca =

Mexican professional wrestler

Personal information
- Born: November 5, 1975 (age 50) Mexico City, Mexico

Professional wrestling career
- Ring name(s): Relampago Sureño; Sangre Azteca
- Billed height: 1.75 m (5 ft 9 in)
- Billed weight: 87 kg (192 lb)
- Billed from: Mexico City, Mexico
- Trained by: Charrito de Oro; Scorpio; Raúl Reyes; Memo Diaz; Negro Casas
- Debut: October 5, 1997

Sangre Azteca (Spanish for "Aztec Blood") (born October 5, 1975) is a Mexican professional wrestler is primarily known for his work for Consejo Mundial de Lucha Libre (CMLL). Sangre Azteca's real name is not revealed in public, as is often the case with masked wrestlers in Mexico where their private lives are kept a secret from the professional wrestling fans. He was part of the rudo stable "Poder Mexica" along with Dragon Rojo Jr. and Misterioso Jr.

== Professional wrestling career ==
=== Consejo Mundial de Lucha Libre ===
After getting trained by Scorpio and Raúl Reyes, he made his debut at the age of 21 and had a win during his debut match. EMLL (now CMLL) found an interest in him and signed him away from International Wrestling Revolution Group (IWRG). While there he became part of a group call "Grupo Cibernetico" of young wrestlers that train together under the guidance of head trainers Guillermo "Memo" Díaz and Negro Casas, that taught them both pro and amateur style wrestling. On July 16, 1999, he teamed with Fugaz to defeat Ricky Marvin and Sombra de Plata in a Lightning Match that stole the show and all four youngsters got a standing ovation from the crowd. The success of this match was so big that all four guys wrestled at CMLL's 66th Anniversary show on September 24, 1999, but in this big event the rudo team lost. Sangre Azteca made his Japanese debut on November 23, 1999, losing to Ricky Marvin, who was also debuting, during a CMLL Japan show. The rivalry continues as of March 17, 2000, Sangre Azteca wrestled Ricky Marvin in a three falls match that Marvin won. His year as a rookie skyrocketed when he won a Luchas de Apuestas (bet match), defeating Pegaso II for his mask on July 3, 2000. Later in 2002, he won the Distrito Federal Tag Team Championship teaming with Ramstein (Fugaz under a new mask and name). They lost the title two years later, in 2004, to Los Rayos Tapatio.

==== Los Guerreros del Infierno (1999–2005) ====
In 1999, 2001, 2003, 2004, and 2005, Sangre Azteca participated in the Gran Alternativa, but failed to make it past the qualifying round each year. Finding no success, he stayed with CMLL and finally won the Mexican National Trios Championship with Doctor X and Nitro in early 2005 as the team of Los Guerreros del Infierno defeating Safari, El Felino, and Volador Jr. Seven months later, they lost the championship to Máximo, El Texano Jr., and El Sagrado, and failed to regain it twice. In late 2005, he was on the 72nd anniversary show of CMLL where he teamed with Apolo Dantes and Mascara Magica and lost to El Felino, Heavy Metal, and Ultimo Dragon. His first singles title was the Mexican National Welterweight Championship, which he won by defeating La Mascara in 2006. In February 2007, Sangre Azteca participated in the Reyes del Aire tournament and was eliminated by Volador Jr. when they were the last two on the ring. At the Homenaje a Dos Leyendas show, Sangre Azteca teamed with allies Los Guerreros del Infierno (Atlantis and Olímpico) to defeat Los Perros del Mal of Mr. Águila, Damián 666, and Halloween. In late 2007, Sangre Azteca teamed with Ephesto and Toscano to face Alex Koslov, El Sagrado, and La Sombra at the 74th anniversary show, which they lost. At the event Homenaje a Dos Leyendas of 2008, Sangre Azteca teamed with Los Guerreros del Infierno of Olímpico and Rey Bucanero to beat Grey Shadow, La Sombra, and El Sagrado. On May 9, 2008, the sixth Reyes del Aire was held. He made it through to the finals, but was eliminated by Valiente. When the Leyenda de Plata was scheduled for the dates of July 4–25, Sangre Azteca entered in the tournament and was not capable enough to win it. In late 2008, Sangre Azteca left Los Guerreros del Infierno and started to wrestle as a single competitor.

==== Poder Mexica (2009–2011) ====
During a Mexican National Welterweight Championship defense against Dragón Rojo Jr., the two went to a double countout, which led Sangre Azteca to state that he was impress by Rojo's ability. The two soon began working together along with Black Warrior to form the group Poder Mexica (Spanish for "Mexican Power"). Their first Mexican National Trios title match was successful, when they defeated El Sagrado, La Sombra, and Volador Jr. on the first try. Black Warrior was later suspended and Misterioso Jr. filled in for him at various shows, making him an unofficial member of Poder Mexica at the time. Sangre Azteca, Dragon Rojo Jr., and Misterioso Jr. were unsuccessful in their bid to win the CMLL World Trios Championship from Héctor Garza, El Hijo del Fantasma, and La Mascara, but at the 2009 Homenaje a Dos Leyendas they were able to beat them in a non-title match. Sangre Azteca, Dragon Rojo Jr., and Black Warrior had their first successful title defense against Máscara Dorada, El Sagrado, and Valiente. During the middle of the year, Valiente stalked Sangre Azteca for a title shot at his Mexican National Welterweight Championship, but Sangre Azteca refused. When the two finally met with the title on the line Valiente defeated Sangre Azteca to end his 33 month run with the Mexican National Welterweight Championship. On the 76th Anniversary Show, Sangre Azteca teamed with Dragon Rojo Jr. and Misterioso Jr. as they lost to the trio of El Sagrado, Hijo del Fantasma, and Mascara Dorada. He confirmed Misterioso Jr. an official member of Poder Mexica after the event. Black Warrior left Poder Mexica late in the year after not teaming with the other members over the summer of 2009. On December 19, 2009, it was announced by the Comisión de Box y Lucha Libre Mexico D.F. that Poder Mexica had been stripped of the Mexican National Trios title because Black Warrior had left CMLL, breaking up the team. At the same time they announced an eight team tournament to crown a new trios champion. Poder Mexica (Azteca, Rojo Jr. and Misterioso Jr.) defeated Fabian El Gitano, Máximo] and Rouge and then Delta, Leono and Valiente to qualify for the final. On January 6, 2010, Mascara Dorada, Stuka Jr., and Metro defeated Poder Mexica to become the new Mexican National Trios Champions.

==== Final matches and departure (2012–2019) ====
On December 25, 2015, as part of CMLL's annual Infierno en el Ring show Sangre Azteca was one of twelve men risking their mask in the main event steel cage match. He was the eighth man to leave the cage, keeping his mask safe in the process.

On August 12, 2019 through its social networks, Azteca announced his departure from CMLL after 21 years, declaring himself an independent luchador.

=== Independent circuit (2019-present) ===
On August 24, 2019, Azteca made his debut in the promotion Nación Lucha Libre (NLL) where he lost to Súper Nova.

== Personal life ==
Sangre Azteca's idol growing up was Dr. Wagner Jr.

== Championships and accomplishments ==
- Association les Professionnels du Catch
  - APC World Championship (1 time, current)
- Comisión de Box y Lucha Libre Mexico D.F.
  - Distrito Federal Tag Team Championship (1 time) – with Ramstein
- Consejo Mundial de Lucha Libre
  - Mexican National Trios Championship (2 times) – with Doctor X and Nitro (1), and Dragon Rojo Jr. and Black Warrior (1)
  - Mexican National Welterweight Championship (1 time)
  - CMLL Bodybuilding Contest (2007 - Intermediate)
- Pro Wrestling Illustrated
  - PWI ranked him #133 of the 500 best singles wrestlers of the PWI 500 in 2008

== Luchas de Apuestas record ==
Winner (wager)	Loser (wager)	Location	Event	Date	Notes
Sangre Azteca (mask)	Ángel del Amor (mask)	Mexico City	Live event	February 24, 1998	
Sangre Azteca (mask)	Pegaso II (mask)	Mexico City	Live event	July 3, 2000	S
