= Poder Mexica =

Professional wrestling stable

Stable
- Members: Sangre Azteca; Misterioso, Jr.
- Former members: Black Warrior; Dragón Rojo, Jr.
- Debut: December 2008

Poder Mexica (Spanish for "Mexican Power") is a professional wrestling stable currently working for Consejo Mundial de Lucha Libre (CMLL). The stable was founded in December 2008 and consists of Sangre Azteca and Misterioso, Jr. Black Warrior and Dragón Rojo, Jr. were originally members of the group, but left in the fall of 2009 and 2010 respectively.

== History ==
In late 2008, Sangre Azteca left the stable Guerreros de la Atlantida because he was not being used much by the group. At the same time Black Warrior's involvement with a group called "La Ola Lagunera" (Spanish for "the Lagunero Wave") petered out. In December 2008 Dragón Rojo, Jr. won a "#1 Contenders" match and thus earned a shot at the Mexican National Welterweight Championship held by Sangre Azteca. The title match ended in a double count out leaving Sangre Azteca the champion but showing that Dragón Rojo, Jr. was not easily defeated.

After the draw Dragón Rojo, Jr. and Sangre Azteca began teaming together along with Black Warrior as the third man, quickly forming a trio called Poder Mexicana. The group saw mixed success around Mexico but remained undefeated in Arena Mexico, CMLL's main venue earning the group a shot at the Mexican National Trios Championship held by Sagrado, La Sombra and Volador Jr. Poder Mexicana won the title in their first attempt, defeating the champions on February 3, 2009. Soon after the win speculation of a unification between the Mexican National Trios Championship and the CMLL World Trios Championship.

Shortly after winning the Championship Black warrior was suspended from working in Mexico City, forcing Poder Mexica to draft Misterioso, Jr. to take the place of Black Warrior when they worked in Mexico City, making him an unofficial a member of Poder Mexicana. At the 2009 Homenaje a Dos Leyendas show Dragón Rojo, Jr. Sangre Azteca and Misteriosos Jr. lost to CMLL World Trios Champions Héctor Garza, La Máscara and El Hijo del Fantasma. the Match and subsequent storyline between the two sets of champions furthered speculations that CMLL may choose to unify the two titles in the future. By mid-April Black Warrior's Mexico City suspension ended and he returned to team with Azteca and Dragón Rojo, Jr. Over the summer of 2009 Black Warrior began working storylines with various Japanese wrestlers working for CMLL, leaving Poder Mexica to team up with Misterioso, Jr. more and more frequently. In September 2009 Sangre Azteca announced that Misterioso, Jr. had officially become a member of Poder Mexica. After not teaming with the other members of Poder Mexica over the summer of 2009, Black Warrior left the group in the fall. On December 19, 2009 it was announced by the Comisión de Box y Lucha Libre Mexico D.F. that Poder Mexica had been stripped of the Mexican National Trios title because Black Warrior had left CMLL, breaking up the team. At the same time they announced an eight team tournament to crown a new trios champion. The top half of the bracket took place on December 22, 2009 and the bottom half of the bracket took place on December 29. In the top bracket the team of Máscara Dorada, Stuka, Jr. and Metro qualified for the finals. The bottom bracket took place on December 29, 2009 and saw the Poder Mexica (Azteca, Rojo, Jr. and Misterioso, Jr.) defeat Fabian El Gitano, Máximo and Rouge and then Delta, Leono and Valiente to qualify for the final. On January 6, 2010 Mascara Dorada, Stuka, Jr. and Metro defeated Poder Mexica to become the new Mexican National Trios Champions. After winning the CMLL World Tag Team Championship with Último Guerrero on November 2, 2010, Dragón Rojo, Jr. announced that he was leaving Poder Mexica and joining Guerrero's Los Guerreros de la Atlantida stable.

== Championships and accomplishments ==
- Consejo Mundial de Lucha Libre

- Mexican National Trios Championship (1 time) – Sangre Azteca, Black Warrior and Dragón Rojo, Jr.
