= IWRG Copa Revolucionaria =

2011 International Wrestling Revolution Group event

Copa Revolucionaria
- Official poster of the event depicting wrestlers in the main and semi-main event
- Promotion: International Wrestling Revolution Group
- Date: November 20, 2011
- City: Naucalpan, State of Mexico
- Venue: Arena Naucalpan

Event chronology
← Previous; La Gran Cruzada	Next → 36 Años de Rayo de Jalisco Jr.

The Copa Revolucionaria (Spanish for "Revolucionary Cup") was a professional wrestling major event, produced by the Mexico based International Wrestling Revolution Group (IWRG) professional wrestling promotion. The event commemorated the start of the Mexican Revolution 100 years prior in 1911.

The event took place on November 20, 2011, at "Arena Naucalpan" in Naucalpan, State of Mexico, IWRG's main venue. The main event saw El Pantera defend the IWRG Rey del Ring Championship against Trauma I. The Copa in Copa Revolucionaria referred to the semi-main event match, a 16-man torneo cibernetico multi-man elimination match where the winner would be awarded the Copa Revolucionaria that was won by Apolo Estrada Jr. In the main event El Pantera successfully defended the IWRG Rey del Ring Championship against challenger Trauma I. The show featured three additional matches.

== Production ==
=== Background ===
The Copa Revolutionaria is not to be mistaken for IWRG's recurring Guerra Revolucionaria ("The Revolutionary War") that IWRG held for the first time in 2009, becoming an annual show held by IWRG with the 2010 Guerra Revolucionaria. IWRG had already held their 2011 Guerra Revolucionaria, which meant that the Copa Revolucionaria was not intended to be a replacement for the normal Guerra Revolucionaria show. The Guerra Revolucionaria events all featured a similar type main event, a multi-man battle royal where each eliminated wrestler remains at ringside as a lumberjack with a leather strap they can use on anyone who leaves the ring. For the Copa Revolucionaria the type of match was changed into a 16-man Torneo Cibernetico ("Cyborg Tournament") elimination match, but eliminated wrestlers were still allowed to remain at ringside to act as Lumberjacks.

=== Storylines ===
The event featured five professional wrestling matches with different wrestlers involved in pre-existing scripted feuds, plots and storylines. Wrestlers portrayed themselves as either heels (referred to as rudos in Mexico, those that portray the "bad guys") or faces (técnicos in Mexico, the "good guy" characters) as they follow a series of tension-building events, which culminated in wrestling matches.

== Event ==
Kortiz, son of Villano III, was originally announced as a participant in the third match of the night, but had to be replaced by Polifacetico due to suffering an injury shortly before the Copa Revolucionaria show.

== Results ==
No.	Results	Stipulations
1	Matrix Jr. defeated Guerrero 2000 – Two falls to none	Best two-out-of-three falls match
2	Los Astros (Astro de Plata and Astro Rey Jr.) defeated Los Gemelos Fantasticos (I and II) – Two falls to one	Best two-out-of-three falls tag team match
3	Eragon, Oficial Rayan and Tritón defeated Avisman, Imposible and Polifacetico – Two falls to one	Best two-out-of-three falls six-man tag team match
4	Apolo Estrada Jr. defeated Alan Extreme, Carta Brava Jr., El Centvrión, Chico Che, Dark Cuervo, Dinamic Black, Dr. Cerebro, El Hijo del Diablo, Eterno, Golden Magic, Multifacético, Dark Ozz, Saruman, Trauma II and Zumbi	Copa Revolucionaria 2011, 16-man torneo cibernetico Match
5	El Pantera (C) defeated Trauma I – two falls to one	Best two-out-of-three falls for the IWRG Rey del Ring Championship

Copa Revolucionaria order of elimination

#	Eliminated	By
1	Alan Extreme	
2	Centvrión	
3	Dinamic Black	
4	Cuervo and Ozz	Disqualification
6	Golden Magic	
7	Eterno	
8	El Hijo del Diablo	
9	Saruman	
10	Zumbi	
11	Carta Brava Jr.	
12	Dr. Cerebro	
13	Trauma II	
14	Multifacético	Apolo Estrada Jr.
15	Chico Che	Apolo Estrada Jr.
16	Winner	Apolo Estrada Jr.
