= Prisión Fatal (2009) =

Mexican professional wrestling show

- Poster showing Avisman, Bushi and FreelanceSuicida
- Promotion: International Wrestling Revolution Group
- Date: July 5, 2009
- City: Naucalpan, State of Mexico
- Venue: Arena Naucalpan

Event chronology
← Previous; El Gran Desafío	Next → Rey del Ring

IWRG Prisión Fatal chronology
← Previous; 2000	Next → 2012

Prisión Fatal (2009) (Spanish for "Fatal Prison") was a professional wrestling supercard event produced by Mexican professional wrestling promotion International Wrestling Revolution Group (IWRG), and took place on July 5, 2009 in Arena Naucalpan, Naucalpan, State of Mexico, Mexico. The main event was the eponymous Prison Fatal (Spanish for "Deadly Prison") Steel cage match where the last person remaining in the cage was forced to be shaved bald or have to unmask as per the match stipulation. 2009 was the first second time that IWRG used the match concept Prisión Fatal. first held in 2000.

In the main event Avisman, Suicida, Bushi and Freelance were all chained to the cage by one hand and had to fight to get a key to unlock the chain and escape. Suicida was the last man in the ring as Avisman climbed over the cage and out, which forced Suicida to have all his hair shaved off afterward. If Bushi had lost he would have been forced to unmask. The show featured four additional matches.

== Production ==
=== Background ===
Starting as far back as at least 2000, the Mexican wrestling promotion International Wrestling Revolution Group (IWRG; Sometimes referred to as Grupo Internacional Revolución in Spanish) has held several annual events where the main event was a multi-man steel cage match where the last wrestler left in the cage would be forced to either remove their wrestling mask or have their hair shaved off under Lucha de Apuestas, or "bet match", rules. In 2009 IWRG created a variation of the steel cage match under the moniker Prison Fatal ("Deadly Prison") approximately once a year since its inception. The Prison Fatal has the added twist that each competitor is chained by the wrist to the cage with a long steel chain and to escape they fight have to get a key to unlock their chain before they are able to escape. The added chain helps to distinguish it from other Steel cage matches held throughout the year such as the IWRG Guerra del Golfo ("Gulf War"), IWRG Guerra de Sexos ("War of the Sexes") or IWRG El Castillo del Terror ("The Tower of Terror") shows. The Prison Fatal shows, as well as the majority of the IWRG shows in general, are held in "Arena Naucalpan", owned by the promoters of IWRG and their main arena.

=== Storylines ===
The event featured five professional wrestling matches with different wrestlers involved in pre-existing scripted feuds, plots and storylines. Wrestlers were portrayed as either heels (referred to as rudos in Mexico, those that portray the "bad guys") or faces (técnicos in Mexico, the "good guy" characters) as they followed a series of tension-building events, which culminated in a wrestling match or series of matches.

== Results ==
No.	Results	Stipulations
1	Fly Star defeated Sangre Latina	Singles match
2	Guizmo and Halcon 2000 defeated Carta Brava Jr. and Vampiro Metalico	Best two-out-of-three falls tag team match
3	Arlequin Rojo, Arlequin Verde, and Judas el Traidor defeated Chico Che, Jack, and Rigo	Best two-out-of-three falls six-man tag team match
4	El Alebrije, Megatronik, and Negro Navarro defeated Fantasma de la Opera, Ricky Cruzz, and Veneno	Best two-out-of-three falls six-man tag team match
5	Avisman defeated Suicida; Also in the match: Bushi and Freelance	4-way Prisión Fatal steel cage match, Lucha de Apuestas, hair vs. hair match
