= Guerra Revolucionaria (2015) =

2015 International Wrestling Revolution Group event

- Official poster showing 11 of the 20 wrestlers in the main event
- Promotion: International Wrestling Revolution Group
- Date: May 17, 2015 (aired May 18, 2015)
- City: Naucalpan, State of Mexico
- Venue: Arena Naucalpan

Event chronology
← Previous; Festival de las Máscaras	Next → La Jaula de Las Locas

Guerra Revolucionaria chronology
← Previous; 2013	Next → —

The Guerra Revolucionaria (2015) (Spanish for "Revolutionary War") show was a major professional wrestling event produced by Mexican professional wrestling promotion International Wrestling Revolution Group (IWRG), which took place on May 17, 2015, in Arena Naucalpan, Naucalpan, State of Mexico, Mexico. The main event of the show was a 20-man Battle Royal where the eliminated wrestlers would all remain at ringside and act as "Lumberjacks" to ensure none of the participants left the ring. Each lumberjack would be given a leather straps they were allowed to use on the still-active competitors. There was no official prize for winning the match other than the increased public profile of the winning wrestler.

== Production ==
=== Background ===
Beginning in 2009 the Mexican wrestling promotion International Wrestling Revolution Group (IWRG; Sometimes referred to as Grupo Internacional Revolución in Spanish) held an annual show called Guerra Revolucionaria ("The Revolutionary War"), a reference to the Mexican revolutionary war (1810-1821). The main event match, the eponymous Guerra Revolucionaria, a 20-man Battle Royal where all 20 wrestlers start out in the ring. Once a wrestler is thrown over the top rope to the floor that wrestler is eliminated from the actual match and instead will act as a "Lumberjack" outside the ring, ensuring that none of remaining competitors try to escape the ring. Each "lumberjack" is given a leather strap that they are allowed to use on anyone that leaves the ring. The multi-man match often allows IWRG to intersect various ongoing storylines as another step in the escalating tension. At other times the match itself was used as a way to start new feuds due to interactions inside or outside the ring. The Guerra Revolucionaria shows, as well as the majority of the IWRG shows in general, are held in "Arena Naucalpan", owned by the promoters of IWRG and their main arena. The 2015 Guerra Revolucionaria show was the sixth time IWRG held a show, not holding a show in 2014.

=== Storylines ===
The event featured four professional wrestling matches with different wrestlers, where some were involved in pre-existing scripted feuds or storylines and others simply put together by the matchmakers without a backstory. Being a professional wrestling event matches are not won legitimately through athletic competition; they are instead won via predetermined outcomes to the matches that is kept secret from the general public. Wrestlers portray either heels (the bad guys, referred to as Rudos in Mexico) or faces (fan favorites or Técnicos in Mexico).

Second generation wrestlers Hijo de Máscara Año 2000 and El Hijo de Dos Caras had been constant rivals follow Hijo de Dos Caras' arrival in IWRG, with both of their famous fathers, Máscara Año 2000 and Dos Caras showing up at one point. The storyline had really escalated in mid-2015 after Hijo de Dos Caras defeated Hijo de Máscara Año 2000 in a one-on-one match. A few weeks later Hijo de Máscara Año 2000 successfully defended the IWRG Rey del Ring ("King of the Ring") Championship against Hijo de Dos Caras, once again by resorting to underhanded means. On July 20, 2014, Hijo de Dos Caras won the vacant IWRG Intercontinental Heavyweight Championship. In subsequent months Hijo de Máscara Año 2000 successfully defended the Rey del Ring championship once more where Cien Caras Jr. showed up to help his cousin out. The two rivals also competed in a MXN 50,000 Ladder match on IWRG's La Isla ("The Island") show alongside Demon Clown, Oficial AK-47, Dr. Wagner Jr., L.A. Park, Trauma I and Veneno, neither man won the match and were more focused on inflicting punishment on each other. The storyline between the two led to them both putting their championship on the line in a match, with Hijo de Dos Caras winning and thus walking away as both the IWRG Intercontinental Heavyweight Champion and the Rey del Ring Champion. Hijo de Dos Caras would remain a double champion for 98 days, until Máscara Año 2000 regained the championship on January 11, 2015 in a match where only the Rey del Ring Championship was on the line. At the 2015 Rebelión de los Juniors Hijo de Dos Caras outlasted a field of seven other wrestlers including Hijo de Máscara Año 2000 to become the number one contender for the IWRG Junior de Juniors Championship. At the 2015 Festival de las Máscaras show two weeks prior to Guerra Revolucionario Black Tiger, Cien Caras Jr. and Hijo de Máscara Año 2000 defeated Hijo de Dos Caras, Chicano and Dr. Wagner Jr. in the main event of the show.

== Aftermath ==
Following his main event victory Hijo de Máscara Año 2000 laid out another challenge to Hijo de Dos Caras to put the IWRG Intercontinental Heavyweight Championship on the line against him, a challenge Hijo de Dos Caras did not respond to at the time. The two rivals faced off in the 2015 Guerra de Familias tournament on July 5, 2015, where the team of Hijo de Dos Caras and Super Nova defeated Hijo de Máscara Año 2000 and Universo 2000 Jr.

== Results ==
No.	Results	Stipulations
1^{D}	Aeroman and Alas de Acero defeated Los Insanity (Araña de Plata Jr. and Atómic Star)	Best two-out-of-three falls singles match
2	Picudo Jr. and Pleve defeated Dragón Celestial and Canon	Best two-out-of-three falls tag team match
3	Electro Boy, Imposible and Los Gringos VIP (El Hijo del Diablo and Avisman) defeated Dragón Celestial and Los Tortugas Ninjas (Leo, Mike and Teelo)	Best two-out-of-three falls eight-person tag team match
4	Hijo de Máscara Año 2000 won the match lastly eliminating El Hijo de Dos Caras; Roller Boy, Metaleón, El Hijo de Pirata Morgan, Danny Casas, X-Fly, Relámpago, Mr. Leo, Emperador Azteca, Hip Hop Man, Freyser, Veneno, Eterno, Canis Lupus, Golden Magic, Máscara Sagrada, El Hijo de Máscara Sagrada, Pantera I, Pantera II	20-Man Battle Royal, Lumberjack's with leather straps match
D / – this was a dark match
