= El Gran Desafío Femenil – Sin Empate, Sin Indulto =

2009 International Wrestling Revolution Group event

- Promotion: International Wrestling Revolution Group
- Date: October 22, 2009
- City: Naucalpan, State of Mexico
- Venue: Arena Naucalpan

Event chronology
← Previous; Guerra del Golfo	Next → El Castillo del Terror

El Gran Desafío chronology
← Previous; 2009	Next → 2010

El Gran Desafío Femenil – Sin Empate, Sin Indulto (Spanish for "The Great Women's Challenge – No draws, no reprieve") was a major professional wrestling event produced and scripted by the Mexican Lucha libre promotion International Wrestling Revolution Group (IWRG) on October 22, 2009. The event was held in Arena Naucalpan, IWRG's home arena and the venue for the majority of their shows. IWRG used the El Gran Destafío name for a show in 2009 and a third El Gran Destafio in 2011, but none since then.

The main event hosted a rare Lucha de Apuestas, or "bet match", between two female luchadoras or professional wrestlers as Mexican native Flor Metálica wrestled and defeated the Japanese wrestler Atsuko Emoto. Afterward Emoto had all her hair shaved off as a result of the Lucha de Apuestas stipulation. IWRG does not normally promote a lot of women's wrestling matches, and the Lucha de Apuestas between Flor Metálica and Emoto is the only IWRG match of its type on record.

== Production ==
=== Background ===
The Mexican lucha libre or professional wrestling promotion International Wrestling Revolution Group (IWRG; at times referred to as Grupo Internacional Revolución in Mexico) holds almost all of their major wrestling shows in Arena Naucalpan, in Naucalpan, State of Mexico, an arena owned and operated by the Moreno family who also owns and operates IWRG. The most prestigious match type in lucha libre is the Lucha de Apuestas (literally "Bet match") where each competitors "bets" either their wrestling mask or their hair on the outcome of the match. The Lucha de Apuestas format was created in 1940, with the first match of its type held on July 14, 1940, where the unmasked Octavio Gaona defeated the masked El Murciélago Enmascarado ("The Masked Bat"), forcing El Murciélago to unmask. Since then the Luchas de Apuestas match has become more important, more prestigious than championship matches with the Lucha de Apuestas matches normally headlining major lucha libre shows.

On July 22, 2009, IWRG held their first El Gran Destafio ("The Great Challenge") major show, with the focal point being a Lucha de Apuestas between IWRG regular Dr. Cerebro and Super-X representative and owner Juventud Guerrera, won by Juventud Guerrera. Four months later IWRG once again used the El Gran Destafio name for a show, this time holding a show called El Gran Desafío Femenil – Sin Empate, Sin Indulto (Spanish for "The Great Women's Challenge – No restrictions, no reprieve") with the focal point being a women's professional wrestling main event. IWRG would use the El Gran Destafio name once more in for a 2011 El Gran Destafio show.

=== Storylines ===
The event featured five professional wrestling matches with different wrestlers involved in pre-existing scripted feuds, plots and storylines. Wrestlers were portrayed as either heels (referred to as rudos in Mexico, those that portray the "bad guys") or faces (técnicos in Mexico, the "good guy" characters) as they followed a series of tension-building events, which culminated in a wrestling match or series of matches.

The group known as Revolución Amandra (Atsuko Emoto, Kyoko Kimura and Tomoka Nakagawa) originally formed in NEO Japan Ladies Pro Wrestling and at one point saw Emoto and Kimura win the NEO Tag Team Championship. In October 2009 the Revolucion Amandra travelled to Mexico for a promotional tour working for various Mexican promotions, including IWRG. On October 15 the trio defeated the team of Mexican wrestlers Flor Metálica, La Diabólica and Josseline during an IWRG show. Following the match Emoto challenged Flor Metálica to a Lucha de Apuestas match, stating that she wanted to demonstrate that Japanese wrestling was better than Mexican. Flor Metálica accepted the match for the following week, leading to the main event of IWRG's El Gran Desafío Femenil – Sin Empate, Sin Indulto show being booked. The match between Atsuko Emoto and Flor Metálica would be the first women's wrestling main event in International Wrestling Revolution Group's history.

== Event ==
In the opening match IWRG wrestling school trainee Comando Negro defeated fellow trainee Halcón 2000 in a Best two-out-of-three-falls match. In the second match, masked wrestler Exodia (son of wrestler Olímpico) defeated La Rata in another match between IWRG wrestling school students. The third match of the night was one of the first matches for a newly formed group known as Los Gringos VIP, as El Gringo Loco and El Hijo del Diablo defeated Péndulo and Star Boy in a best two-out-of-three-falls tag team match.

The fourth match of the night was the only traditional lucha libre best two-out-of-three falls six-man tag team match which saw the team of Black Terry, Pirata Morgan and Tóxico defeat Brazo de Plata, Chico Che and Mike Segura. For the main event Atsuko Emoto had both members of Revolucion Amandra in her corner while Flor Metálica was back up by then-reigning Distrito Federal Women's Champion La Diabólica. Flor Metálica won the match two falls to one, forcing Emoto to have all her hair shaved off as a result.

== Aftermath ==
The following week, on October 25, 2009, La Diabólica teamed up with Flor Metálica and Josselin to defeat Revolución Amandra. After their victory Flor Metálica challenged La Diabólica to defend her Distrito Federal Women's Championship against her. On November 15, 2009, La Diabólica put the championship on the line, but since the match was held outside of the Mexican Federal District it was billed as the "Metropolitan Women's Championship" instead. La Diabólica retained the championship, defeating Flor Metálica two falls to one.

== Results ==
No.	Results	Stipulations	Times
1	Comando Negro defeated Halcón 2000	Best two-out-of-three-falls match	10:21
2	Exodia defeated La Rata	Best two-out-of-three-falls match	17:34
3	Los Gringos VIP (El Gringo Loco and El Hijo del Diablo) defeated Péndulo and Star Boy	Best two-out-of-three-falls tag team match	20:01
4	Black Terry, Pirata Morgan and Tóxico defeated Brazo de Plata, Chico Che and Mike Segura	Best two-out-of-three falls six-man tag team match	18:05
5	Flor Metálica defeated Atsuko Emoto	Best two-out-of-three-falls Lucha de Apuestas, hair vs. hair match	15:29
