= Guerra Revolucionaria (2013) =

2013 International Wrestling Revolution Group event

- Official poster for the event
- Promotion: International Wrestling Revolution Group
- Date: November 10, 2013
- City: Naucalpan, State of Mexico
- Venue: Arena Naucalpan

Event chronology
← Previous; El Castillo del Terror	Next → Caravana de Campeones

Guerra Revolucionaria chronology
← Previous; 2011	Next → 2015

The Guerra Revolucionaria (2013) (Spanish for "Revolutionary War") show was a major professional wrestling event produced and scripted by the Mexican professional wrestling promotion International Wrestling Revolution Group (IWRG), which took place on November 10, 2013 in Arena Naucalpan, Naucalpan, State of Mexico, Mexico. The main event of the show was a 20-man Battle Royal where the eliminated wrestlers would all remain at ringside and act as "Lumberjacks" to ensure none of the participants left the ring. Each lumberjack would be given a leather straps they were allowed to use on the still-active competitors. There was no official prize for winning the match other than the increased public profile of the winning wrestler.

In the end Hijo del Máscara Año 2000 pinned Trauma I to win the Guerra Revolucionaria match to become the number one contender for the IWRG Rey del Ring Championship, winning a match with then champion Oficial 911. The show included three further matches. The 2013 Guerra Revolucionaria was the first time the winner of the tournament was given a tangible "prize" for winning.

== Production ==
=== Background ===
Beginning in 2009 the Mexican wrestling promotion International Wrestling Revolution Group (IWRG; Sometimes referred to as Grupo Internacional Revolución in Spanish) held an annual show called Guerra Revolucionaria ("The Revolutionary War"), a reference to the Mexican revolutionary war (1810–1821). The main event match, the eponymous Guerra Revolucionaria, a 20-man "over the top" Battle Royal where all 20 wrestlers start out in the ring. Once a wrestler is thrown over the top rope to the floor that wrestler is eliminated from the actual match, from that point on they will act as a "Lumberjack" outside the ring, ensuring that none of remaining competitors try to escape the ring. Each "lumberjack" is given a leather strap that they are allowed to use on anyone that leaves the ring. There is no specific "award" for winning the Guerra Revolucionaria tournament. The multi-man match often allows IWRG to intersect various ongoing storylines as another step in the escalating tension. At other times, the match itself was used as a way to start new feuds due to interactions inside or outside the ring. The Guerra Revolucionaria shows, as well as the majority of the IWRG shows, in general, are held in Arena Naucalpan, owned by the promoters of IWRG, and it is their main venue. The 2013 Guerra Revolucionaria show was the fourth time that IWRG held an event under that label, having not held a Guerra Revolucionaria show in 2012. The first three Guerra Revolucionaria tournaments did not offer a specific, actual reward to the winner of the match, but for the 2013 tournament IWRG announced that the winner of the match would become the number one contender to the IWRG Rey del Ring Championship.

=== Storylines ===
The event featured four professional wrestling matches with different wrestlers, where some were involved in pre-existing scripted feuds or storylines and others simply put together by the matchmakers without a backstory. Being a professional wrestling event matches are not won legitimately through athletic competition; they are instead won via predetermined outcomes to the matches that is kept secret from the general public. Wrestlers portray either heels (the bad guys, referred to as Rudos in Mexico) or faces (fan favorites or Técnicos in Mexico).

in 2002 IWRG introduced the Rey del Ring ("King of the Ring"), an annual professional wrestling tournament. After the 2011 Rey del Ring tournament IWRG presented the winner (Pantera) with a championship belt, a belt that can be defended between the annual tournament. On June 20, 2013 Dinamic Black pinned Oficial 911 to win the IWRG Rey del Ring Championship, less than a month after Oficial 911 won the 2013 Rey del Ring tournament. Oficial 911 would regain the championship on September 5, 2013. In November IWRG announced that the winner of that year's Guerra Revolucionaria would become the number one contender for the IWRG Rey del Ring Championship.

== Event ==
In the second match of the night, a three tag team elimination match Atomic Star and Electro Boy first eliminated the team of Alfa and Omega and then went on to also defeat Los Fulgors (Fulgor I and Fulgor II) to win the match.

The main event 20-man match saw the following wrestlers eliminated: Oficial AK-47, Alan Extreme, Anubis Black, Apolo Estrada Jr., Bombero Infernal, Danny Casas, Douki, Dr. Cerebro, Eterno, Golden Magic, El Hijo del Diablo, Picudo Jr., Saurman, Oficial Spartan, Tony Rivera, Trauma II, Veneo and X-Fly. The match came down to Trauma I and Hijo del Máscara Año 2000, with Hijo del Máscara Año 2000 gaining the victory to become the official challenger for the IWRG Rey del Ring Championship.

== Aftermath ==
El Hijo del Máscara Año 2000 received his match for the IWRG Rey del Ring Championship two week after the Guerra Revolucionaria show. The match took place on November 24, 2013 and was the main event of the Caravana de Campeones ("Caravan of Champions") and saw Oficial 911 successfully defend the championship. In early 2014 Golden Magic won the IWRG Rey del Ring Championship from Oficial 911. Three months later El Hijo del Máscara Año 2000 won the IWRG Rey del Ring Championship by winning the 2014 Rey del Ring tournament. In October, 2014 El Hijo de Dos Caras won the IWRG Rey del Ring Championship, but El Hijo del Máscara Año 2000 regained it three months later, holding on to it until he was forced to vacate it for the 2015 Rey del Ring tournament.

== Results ==
No.	Results	Stipulations
1	Emperador Azteca and Sky Angel defeated Matrix Jr. and Zurdog	Tag team match
2	Atomic Star and Electro Boy defeated Alfa and Omega and Los Fulgors (Fulgor I and Fulgor II)	Three-way tag team match
3	Imposible, Nimrod and Oficial 911 defeated Astro Rey Jr., Chico Che and Dragón Celestial	Best two-out-of-three falls eight-person tag team match
4	Hijo del Máscara Año 2000 won the Guerra Revolucionaria; Also in the match: Oficial AK-47, Alan Extreme, Anubis Black, Apolo Estrada Jr., Bombero Infernal, Danny Casas, Douki, Dr. Cerebro, Eterno, Golden Magic, El Hijo del Diablo, Picudo Jr., Saurman, Oficial Spartan, Tony Rivera, Trauma I, Trauma II, Veneo and X-Fly	20-Man Battle Royal, Lumberjack's with leather straps match – #1 Contender for the IWRG Rey del Ring Championship
