= Guerra de Escuelas =

2015 International Wrestling Revolution Group event

- Official poster of the event depicting (left to right) Dragón Celestial, Aeroman, Black Terry, Aramis and Eterno
- Promotion: International Wrestling Revolution Group
- Date: June 10, 2015 (aired June 14, 2015)
- City: Naucalpan, State of Mexico
- Venue: Arena Naucalpan

Event chronology
| ← Previous; La Jaula de Las Locas | Next → Guerra de Familias |

Guerra de Escuelas (Spanish for "War of the Schools") was an annual professional wrestling major event produced by Mexican professional wrestling promotion International Wrestling Revolution Group (IWRG), which took place on May 5, 2015 in Arena Naucalpan, Naucalpan, State of Mexico, Mexico. The focal point of the event was an ongoing storyline rivalry between IWRG's wrestling school led by their teacher Black Terry and the Gym Eterno wrestling school led by Eterno and was an extension of the personal feud between Black Terry and Eterno. The undercard featured several matches with wrestling students from other schools such as Gym Hip Hop Man, Gym Skayde and Gym Zeus led by Hip Hop Man, Skayde and Oficial 911.

== Storylines ==
The event featured five professional wrestling matches with different wrestlers involved in pre-existing scripted feuds, plots and storylines. Wrestlers were portrayed as either heels (referred to as rudos in Mexico, those that portray the "bad guys") or faces (técnicos in Mexico, the "good guy" characters) as they followed a series of tension-building events, which culminated in a wrestling match or series of matches. IWRG often promotes shows to promote wrestlers who train at IWRG's wrestling school Futuro Idolos de Lucha Libre (FILL) and has on several occasions held a Torneo FILL where students from IWRG's school has faced off against students from rival schools. The Guerra de Escuelas was a major show held by IWRG centering on a storyline between the main FILL trainer, Black Terry and the main Gym Eterno trainer, Eterno, which had started months earlier after Eterno claimed to be a much better trainer than Black Terry.

== Results ==
| No. | Results | Stipulations |
|---|---|---|
| 1^{D} | Demonio Imperial, Soldado de la Muerte and Ultimo Caballero defeated Canario, Magic Dragon and Vardeus | Best two-out-of-three falls six-man tag team match |
| 2 | Adrenalina, El Hijo de Alebrije and Voltar defeated Blue Monsther, Magnum 44 and Super Jack | Best two-out-of-three falls six-man tag team match |
| 3 | Gym Hip Hop Man (Caballero de Plata, Sonic and Voraz) defeated Gym Skayde (Aztlan, Enigma and Vortize) | Best two-out-of-three falls six-man tag team match |
| 4 | Gym Zeus (Espada de Plata, Kaiser Dragon and Toxin Boy) defeated Acero, Electro Boy and Marduk | Best two-out-of-three falls six-man tag team match |
| 5 | Gym Eterno (Aramis, Atomic Star and Eterno) defeated Gym FILL (Aeroman, Black Terry and Dragón Celestial) | Best two-out-of-three falls six-man tag team match |
D / – this was a dark match
