= Festival de las Máscaras (2015) =

2015 International Wrestling Revolution Group event

- Official poster for the show with the main event competitors (left to right) Chicano, El Hijo de Dos Caras, Dr. Wagner Jr., Black Tiger III, Cien Caras Jr. and Hijo del Máscara Año 2000
- Promotion: International Wrestling Revolution Group
- Date: May 5, 2015
- City: Naucalpan, State of Mexico
- Venue: Arena Naucalpan

Event chronology
← Previous; Ruleta de la Muerte	Next → Guerra Revolucionaria

IWRG Festival de las Máscaras chronology
← Previous; 2014	Next → 2016

Festival de las Máscaras (2015) (Spanish for "Festival of the Mask") was an annual professional wrestling major event produced by Mexican professional wrestling promotion International Wrestling Revolution Group (IWRG), which took place on May 5, 2015, in Arena Naucalpan, Naucalpan, State of Mexico, Mexico. For this annual event IWRG has gotten special permission from the "Comisión de Box y Lucha Libre Mexico D.F." (Mexico City Boxing and Wrestling Commission) to allow wrestlers who had previously been unmasked after losing a Luchas de Apuestas, or bet match, to wear their masks again for this show only.

== Production ==
=== Background ===
The wrestling mask has always held a sacred place in lucha libre, carrying with it a mystique and anonymity beyond what it means to wrestlers elsewhere in the world. The ultimate humiliation a luchador can suffer is to lose a Lucha de Apuestas, or bet match. Following a loss in a Lucha de Apuesta match the masked wrestler would be forced to unmask, state their real name and then would be unable to wear that mask while wrestling anywhere in Mexico. Since 2007 the Mexican wrestling promotion International Wrestling Revolution Group (IWRG; Sometimes referred to as Grupo Internacional Revolución in Spanish) has held a special annual show where they received a waiver to the rule from the State of Mexico Wrestling Commission and wrestlers would be allowed to wear the mask they previously lost in a Lucha de Apuestas. The annual Festival de las Máscaras ("Festival of the Masks") event is also partly a celebration or homage of lucha libre history with IWRG honoring wrestlers of the past. The IWRG's Festival de las Máscaras shows, as well as the majority of the IWRG shows in general, are held in "Arena Naucalpan", owned by the promoters of IWRG and their main arena. The 2012 Festival de las Máscaras show was the sixth year in a row IWRG held the show.

=== Storylines ===
The event featured five professional wrestling matches with different wrestlers involved in pre-existing scripted feuds, plots and storylines. Wrestlers were portrayed as either heels (referred to as rudos in Mexico, those that portray the "bad guys") or faces (técnicos in Mexico, the "good guy" characters) as they followed a series of tension-building events, which culminated in a wrestling match or series of matches.

Previously unmasked wrestlers

Name	Lost mask to	Date	Ref
Torguillos Ninja Miguel Ángel	Oficial Fierro	January 1, 2008	
Veneno	Gran Markus, Jr.	March 17, 2002	
El Hijo del Diablo	Místico	December 1, 2006	
El Pantera II	Misterioso, Jr.	July 14, 2006	
Eterno	El Forastero and Estigma	July 20, 2008	
Black Tiger III	L.A. Park	February 4, 2006	

== Results ==
No.	Results	Stipulations
1	Electro Boy defeated Atomic Star, Dragón Celestial, Hip Hop Man and Magnum 44	5-Way Match
2	Los Tortugas Ninjas (Leo, Mike and Rafy) defeated Los Torguillos Ninjas (Leonardo, Miguel Ángel and Raphael)	Best two-out-of-three falls six-man "Lucha Libre rules" tag team match
3	Golden Magic, Guerrero Maya and Veneno defeated Imposible and Los Gringos VIP (Apolo Estrada Jr. and El Hijo del Diablo)	Best two-out-of-three falls six-man "Lucha Libre rules" tag team match
4	El Pantera I, El Pantera II and El Solar defeated Canis Lupus, Eterno and Negro Navarro	Best two-out-of-three falls six-man "Lucha Libre rules" tag team match
5	Black Tiger III, Cien Caras Jr. and Hijo del Máscara Año 2000 defeated Chicano, Dr. Wagner Jr. and El Hijo de Dos Caras	Best two-out-of-three falls six-man "Lucha Libre rules" tag team match
