= El Gran Desafío =

Series of wrestling events in Mexico

El Gran Desafío (Spanish for "The Great Challenge") is a series of professional wrestling supercard events scripted and produced by Mexican professional wrestling promotion International Wrestling Revolution Group (IWRG). The first show to use the name was held on July 2, 2009 in Arena Naucalpan, the same location all subsequent Gran Desafío events were held. IWRG has held three additional Gran Desafío shows, with the most recent held on July 17, 2011.

== Event history ==
The Mexican professional wrestling promotion International Wrestling Revolution Group (IWRG) first held a professional wrestling supercard called El Gran Desafío ("The Great Challenge") on July 2, 2009 in their home arena Arena Naucalpan. The main event featured IWRG-mainstay Dr. Cerebro against internationally known wrestler Juventud Guerrera in a best two-out-of-three falls Lucha de Apuestas, hair vs. hair match. Three months later IWRG held another Gran Desafío show, this time titled El Gran Desafío Femenil – Sin Empate, Sin Indulto (Spanish for "The Great Women's Challenge – No draws, no reprieve") which featured a rare for IWRG women's wrestling main event as Flor Metálica defeated Atsuko Emoto in a Lucha de Apuestas match, forcing Emoto to have her hair shaved off. the El Gran Desafío event returned in 2010, with the only Gran Desafío show not to be main evented by a Lucha de Apuestas match. Instead the main event was a double championship match as IWRG Intercontinental Lightweight Champion Dr. Cerebro defeated WWS World Welterweight Champion El Hijo del Diablo to become a double champion. July 17, 2011 saw the 2011 Gran Desafío take place, with Oficial 911 defeating Multifacético in a mask vs. mask match . As a result of his loss, Multifacético was forced to unmask and reveal his real name.

== Dates, venues, and main events ==
Event	Date	City	Venue	Main event	Ref(s)
2009	July 2, 2009	Naucalpan, Mexico State	Arena Naucalpan	Juventud Guerrera vs. Dr. Cerebro in a best two-out-of-three falls Lucha de Apuestas, hair vs. hair match	
Feminil	October 22, 2009	Naucalpan, Mexico State	Arena Naucalpan	Flor Metálica vs. Atsuko Emoto in a best two-out-of-three falls Lucha de Apuestas, hair vs. hair match	
2010	March 21, 2010	Naucalpan, Mexico State	Arena Naucalpan	Dr. Cerebro (c - IWRG) vs. El Hijo del Diablo (c - WWS) in a Singles match for the IWRG Intercontinental Lightweight Championship and the WWS World Welterweight Championship	
2011	July 17, 2011	Naucalpan, Mexico State	Arena Naucalpan	Oficial 911 vs. Multifacético in a best two-out-of-three falls Lucha de Apuestas, mask vs. mask match	
