= Prisión Fatal (August 2014) =

2014 International Wrestling Revolution Group event

- Official poster for the event with all eight competitors in the main event match being shown
- Promotion: International Wrestling Revolution Group
- Date: August 27, 2014
- City: Naucalpan, State of Mexico
- Venue: Arena Naucalpan

Event chronology
← Previous; Sin Escape Con Correas	Next → La Isla

IWRG Prisión Fatal chronology
← Previous; May 2014	Next → January 2017

Prisión Fatal (2014) was a professional wrestling major event, produced by the Mexico based International Wrestling Revolution Group (IWRG) professional wrestling promotion. The event took on August 27, 2014, at "Arena Naucalpan" in Naucalpan, State of Mexico, IWRG's main venue and was the fourth show promoted under that name. The main event was the eponymous Prisión Fatal (Spanish for "Deadly Prison") Steel cage match where the last person remaining in the cage was forced to unmasked or shaved bald as per the match stipulation. The Prisión Fatal match included Alan Extreme, Chucho el Roto, Ciclon Black, Golden Magic, Metaleón, Relámpago, Tony Rivera and Yakuza. Ciclon Black, Golden Magic, Metaleón, Relámpago and Yakuza all put their mask on the line while Alan Extreme, Chucho el Roto and Tony Rivera risked their hair on the outcome of the match. In the end Ciclon Black was the seventh and last man to climb out of the cage, leaving Alan Extreme behind. After the match Alan Extreme had all his hair shaved off while in the ring as the lucha libre traditions dictate. The show also featured Los Gringos VIP (Apolo Estrada, Jr., Avisman and El Hijo del Diablo) defend the Distrito Federal Trios Championship against Black Terry, Dr. Cerebro and Veneno. The Distrito Federal championship is IWRG's secondary trios title and is only allowed to be defended in the Distrito Federal of Mexico City. Also on the show the AIWA Argentinean National Cruiserweight Champion Hip Hop Man defended the championship against Mexican challenger Dragón Celestial as Hip Hop Man was visiting Mexico from Argentina. The show featured two additional matches.

== Production ==
=== Background ===
Starting as far back as at least 2000, the Mexican wrestling promotion International Wrestling Revolution Group (IWRG; Sometimes referred to as Grupo Internacional Revolución in Spanish) has held several annual events where the main event was a multi-man steel cage match where the last wrestler left in the cage would be forced to either remove their wrestling mask or have their hair shaved off under Lucha de Apuestas, or "bet match", rules. From 2012 IWRG has promoted a variation of the steel cage match under the moniker Prisión Fatal ("Deadly Prison") at least once a year since its inception. The Prisión Fatal has the added twist that each competitor is chained by the wrist to the cage with a long steel chain and to escape they fight have to get a key to unlock their chain before they are able to escape. The added chain helps to distinguish it from other Steel cage matches held throughout the year such as the IWRG Guerra del Golfo ("Gulf War"), IWRG Guerra de Sexos ("War of the Sexes") or IWRG El Castillo del Terror ("The Tower of Terror") shows. The Prisión Fatal shows, as well as the majority of the IWRG shows in general, are held in "Arena Naucalpan", owned by the promoters of IWRG and their main arena. The August 2014 Prisión Fatal show was the fourth time that IWRG promoted a show under that name and the second time in 2014.

=== Storylines ===
The event featured five professional wrestling matches with different wrestlers involved in pre-existing scripted feuds, plots and storylines. Wrestlers were portrayed as either heels (referred to as rudos in Mexico, those that portray the "bad guys") or faces (técnicos in Mexico, the "good guy" characters) as they followed a series of tension-building events, which culminated in a wrestling match or series of matches.

== Results ==
No.	Results	Stipulations
1^{D}	Capitain Muerte (Note: This was not Bombero Infernal, who had originally played the character, but a new wrestler under the mask.) defeated Sky Angel	Tag Team match
2	Anubis Black and Matrix, Jr. defeated Galaxy and Latigo	Tag Team match
3	Dragón Celestial defeated Hip Hop Man (C)	Best two-out-of-three falls match for the AIWA Argentinean National Cruiserweight Championship
4	Los Gringos VIP (Apolo Estrada, Jr., Avisman and El Hijo del Diablo) (C) defeated Black Terry, Dr. Cerebro and Veneno	Best two-out-of-three falls match for the Distrito Federal Trios Championship
5	Ciclon Black defeated Alan Extreme; Also in the match: Chucho el Roto, Golden Magic, Metaleón, Relámpago, Tony Rivera and Yakuza	Prisión Fatal Steel cage match
D / – this was a dark match

=== Order of escape ===
1. Chucho el Roto
2. Yakuza
3. Golden Magic
4. Relámpago
5. Tony Rivera
6. Metaleón
7. Ciclon Black
