= Prisión Fatal (March 2013) =

2013 International Wrestling Revolution Group event

- Official poster for the 2013 Prisión Fatal event
- Promotion: International Wrestling Revolution Group
- Date: March 17, 2013
- City: Naucalpan, State of Mexico
- Venue: Arena Naucalpan

Event chronology
← Previous; El Protector	Next → Guerra de Familias

Prisión Fatal chronology
← Previous; 2012	Next → June 2013

Prisión Fatal (March 2013) was a professional wrestling major event, produced by the Mexico based International Wrestling Revolution Group (IWRG) professional wrestling promotion. The event took on March 17, 2013, at "Arena Naucalpan" in Naucalpan, State of Mexico, IWRG's main venue. The main event was the eponymous Prisión Fatal (Spanish for "Fatal Prison") Steel cage match where the last person remaining in the cage was forced to unmasked or shaved bald as per the match stipulation. The Prisión Fatal match included Rayo de Jalisco, Jr., Máscara Año 2000, Jr., Cien Caras, Jr. and Pirata Morgan. Of the four Rayo de Jalisco, Jr. and Cien Caras, Jr. are both masked and risked their masks while Máscara Año 2000, Jr. and Pirata Morgan were unmasked and thus put their hair on the line. Pirata Morgan lost the match and had all his hair shaved off after the match. The show included four additional matches including Dinamic Black defending the IWRG Intercontinental Welterweight Championship against Carta Brava, Jr.

== Production ==
=== Background ===
Starting as far back as at least 2000, the Mexican wrestling promotion International Wrestling Revolution Group (IWRG; Sometimes referred to as Grupo Internacional Revolución in Spanish) has held several annual events where the main event was a multi-man steel cage match where the last wrestler left in the cage would be forced to either remove their wrestling mask or have their hair shaved off under Lucha de Apuestas, or "bet match", rules. From 2012 IWRG has promoted a variation of the steel cage match under the moniker Prisión Fatal ("Deadly Prison") at least once a year since its inception. The Prisión Fatal has the added twist that each competitor is chained by the wrist to the cage with a long steel chain and to escape they fight have to get a key to unlock their chain before they are able to escape. The added chain helps to distinguish it from other Steel cage matches held throughout the year such as the IWRG Guerra del Golfo ("Gulf War"), IWRG Guerra de Sexos ("War of the Sexes") or IWRG El Castillo del Terror ("The Tower of Terror") shows. The Prisión Fatal shows, as well as the majority of the IWRG shows in general, are held in "Arena Naucalpan", owned by the promoters of IWRG and their main arena. The 2013 Prisión Fatal show was the second time that IWRG promoted a show under that name.

=== Storylines ===
The event featured five professional wrestling matches with different wrestlers involved in pre-existing scripted feuds, plots and storylines. Wrestlers were portrayed as either heels (referred to as rudos in Mexico, those that portray the "bad guys") or faces (técnicos in Mexico, the "good guy" characters) as they followed a series of tension-building events, which culminated in a wrestling match or series of matches.

The event included wrestlers from International Wrestling Revolution Group (IWRG) and a number of Freelance wrestlers as well. The biggest "Freelance" name was Rayo de Jalisco, Jr. who participated in the main event match. Rayo, Jr. competed at Consejo Mundial de Lucha Libre's (CMLL) 2013 Homenaje a Dos Leyendas show only two days before the Prisión Fatal match.

The Prisión Fatal concept was originally unveiled on December 2, 2012, during IWRG's first ever Prisión Fatal event. The match concept involved a 15 foot tall steel cage surrounding the wrestling ring. The competitors, so far always four, would each be attached by the wrist to a long chain where the other end is attached to the cage. The object of the match is to reach the key to the lock that is hung from the cage. Once a wrestler has the key he is able to unlock himself and climb out of the cage, thus escaping the match. The last man left in the ring would be forced to unmask and reveal his real name if he is masked, or have his hair shaved totally off if he is unmasked, as per the Luchas de Apuestas traditions. For the match Rayo de Jalisco, Jr. and Cien Caras, Jr. both risk their mask on the outcome while Pirata Morgan and Máscara Año 2000, Jr. risk their hair. Of the four wrestlers involved Máscara Año 2000, Jr. has only lost one Apuestas match, which forced him to unmask, while Pirata Morgan has lost a number of Apuestas matches and thus been shaved bald on multiple occasions in his 30-plus year career. Cien Caras, Jr. and Máscara Año 2000, Jr. had at this point been teaming together since 2007, forming Los Capos Junior along with Hijo de Máscara Año 2000, with no storyline signs of tension or friction between the two before the match was announced. Rayo de Jalisco, Jr. had not worked for IWRG on a regular basis since 2006 and not worked for IWRG in the months leading up to the Prisión Fatal show, making his inclusion in the steel cage match a bit of a surprise. Rayo de Jalisco, Jr. had been involved in a long running storyline feud with Los Capos, including Máscara Año 2000, Jr.'s father Máscara Año 2000, the storyline father of Cien Caras, Jr., Cien Caras and Universo 2000, but that storyline had up until the time of the show being announced only sporadically involved the second-generation Capos, primarily when Rayo de Jalisco, Jr. teamed up with his son Rayman to take on the senior/junior Máscara Año 2000s. Pirata Morgan and his sons had been a regular worker for IWRG for several years and had at times wrestled Los Capos Junior, but this had never escalated into a long running storyline feud. The first real interaction between the factions in the main event of the Prisión Fatal show happened on March 10, 2013, during the main event of an IWRG event where Cien Caras, Jr. and Máscara Año 2000, Jr. teamed up with Hijo de Máscara Año 2000 to take on the team of Hijo de Pirata Morgan, Pirata Morgan and Electroshock. During the match Cien Caras, Jr. used an illegal low blow on Hijo de Pirata Morgan to win the first fall for his team, taking advantage of the fact that all six competitors were in the ring at the same time, distracting the referee. During the second fall Pirata Morgan tried to gain a measure of revenge for his son and pulled Cien Caras, Jr.'s mask off, but this illegal move was noticed by the referee who disqualified his team for the overall loss. Following the match all six wrestlers fought both inside and outside of the ring until they were separated by officials.

On the undercard newly crowned IWRG Intercontinental Welterweight Champion Dinamic Black would defend his title against the "Official challenger" Carta Brava, Jr. IWRG did not announce the specific reason why Carta Brava, Jr. was selected as the next challenger, simply announcing the title match between the two on March 6, 2013. Dinamic Black had defeated Oficial Rayan on February 24, 2013, to win the championship and the Prisión Fatal show would be his first title defense. The champion and the challenger faced off for the first time after the Prisión Fatal match was announced on March 10, 2013. Carta Brava, Jr. teamed up with fellow rudos Canis Lupus and Oficial 911 while Dinamic Black teamed up with Dr. Cerebro and El Ángel. During the match the champion and the challenger clashed on several occasions, including Carta Brava, Jr. trying to unmask the champion on several occasions.

None of the remaining three matches on the show had a storyline to explain the matches. The first two matches would be regular Tag Team matches, with the first pitting the team of Mr. Leo and Galaxie against Fulgor and Araña de Plata, with Fulgor replacing Araña de Plata's regular partner Astro de Plata who was injured at the time. The second would have the team of Ángel del Amor and Saruman take on the team of Avisman and Imposible. The third match of the night, the only traditional lucha libre Best two-out-of-three falls six-man tag team match will have IWRG regulars Veneno, Chico Che and Golden Magic wrestle veteran Black Terry, second-generation wrestler Apolo Estrada, Jr. and Tomahawk. The Prisión Fatal show was Tomahawk's first major IWRG show after having made his Mexican debut on February 28, 2013, and had previously worked for . Dragon Gate in Japan under the ring name Tomahawk TT. Tomahawk had come to Mexico on a "training excursion" to get more experience in the Mexican wrestling style similar to Eita who had been training in IWRG for several months before Tomahawk's debut.

== Event ==
The opening match saw Dr. Diabolico replace the originally announced Mr. Leo with no prior announcement of the change, nor any official explanation for the substitution. The tecnico team of Araña de Plata and Fulgore defeated Dr. Diabolico and Galaxi in two straight falls. In the second match of the night the team of Ángel Del Amor and Saruman won both the first and the third fall as they defeated the experienced Avisman and the relative newcomer Imposible. During the third match the focal point of the six-man tag team match was the interaction between Veneno and Apolo Estrada, Jr. as Veneno, Golden Magic and Chico Che won both the second and third fall to defeat Estrada, Jr., Black Terry and Tomahawk.

Dinamic Black was accompanied by fellow tecnico Golden Magic for his first ever IWRG Intercontinental Welterweight Championship defense against Carta Brava, Jr. The challenger was accompanied by Apolo Estrada, Jr. who remained in the challengers corner after the introductions. Carta Brava, Jr. immediately targeted Dinamic Black's legs, trying to keep the high flier from being able to wrestle the style of match he was used to, but the tactics backfired on him as Dinamic Black reversed a submission hold and pinned Carta Brava, Jr. to take the first fall. The challenger evened the score only two minutes into the second fall when he pinned Dinamic Black to tie the match up at one fall a piece. During the third fall Apolo Estrada, Jr. attacked Golden Magic outside the ring, which caused the referee to throw Estrada, Jr. out of the arena, negating Carta Brava's cheating tactics. Carta Brava, Jr. looked like he was about to win the match when he applied a submission hold while the referee was distracted by ejecting Apolo Estrada, Jr. By the time the referee returned to the ring Dinamic Black had reached the ropes and thus forced his opponent to break the hold. Carta Brava, Jr. complained to the referee, only to be rolled up by Dinamic Black for the three count, which meant Dinamic Black successfully defended his championship. After the match the crowd threw money into the ring, which was the audience's way of showing their appreciation for a good match.

IWRG decided not to use the chains that were an integral part of the original Prisión Fatal match and instead had all four wrestlers remain in the steel cage for 10 minutes before they could even attempt to escape. During the introductions Los Capos Junior attacked Rayo de Jalisco, Jr. before he even got in the ring, looking to gain an early advantage in the match. After fighting outside the ring the IWRG officials finally corralled all four wrestlers inside the steel cage and locked the door for the 10 minute count down. Only minutes into the match the masks of both Cien Caras, Jr. and Rayo de Jalisco, Jr. were torn open and all four wrestlers were bleeding from hitting the cage. Once the 10 minutes were up Rayo de Jalisco, Jr. was the first man to successfully climb up the side of the 15 foot tall cage and over the top, removing himself from the match and keeping his mask safe. After double teaming Pirata Morgan for a while Cien Caras, Jr. took advantage of the situation and climbed out of the cage as well, leaving the two unmasked men behind. At this point Hijo de Máscara Año 2000 came to ringside wearing street clothes and his mask and climbed in the ring to help his brother out. Moments later Pirata Morgan, Jr., Pirata Morgan's son climbed in the ring as well to help even the score. IWRG has in the past had wrestlers not originally in the match lose the match, teasing that Hijo de Máscara Año 2000 or Pirata Morgan, Jr. might possibly lose their mask. After fighting for a couple of minutes both of the unannounced participants climbed out of the ring but remained at ringside as Máscara Año 2000, Jr. and Pirata Morgan fought while clinging to the side of the cage. Máscara Año 2000, Jr. was the first one to get one leg over the top of the cage, which by IWRG rules meant that he had escaped, leaving Pirata Mogan as the last man in the ring. Pirata Mogan had to stand in the middle of the ring and have all his hair shaved off as Los Capos Junior celebrated their victory. Moments later they attacked Pirata Morgan, Jr. and ripped his mask off, holding both the mask and Pirata Morgan's hair up as if they were trophies.

=== Results ===
No.	Results	Stipulations
1	Fulgor and Araña de Plata defeated Dr. Diabolico and Galaxie – two falls to zero	Tag Team match
2	Ángel del Amor and Saruman defeated Avisman and Imposible – two falls to one	Tag Team Match
3	Veneno, Chico Che and Golden Magic defeated Tomahawk, Apolo Estrada, Jr. and Black Terry – two falls to one	Best two-out-of-three falls six-man tag team match
4	Dinamic Black (C) defeated Carta Brava, Jr. – two falls to one	Best two out of three falls for the IWRG Intercontinental Welterweight Championship
5	Pirata Morgan lost to Máscara Año 2000, Jr. in a match that also included Rayo de Jalisco, Jr. and Cien Caras, Jr.	Prisión Fatal Steel cage match
