= El Gran Desafío (2010) =

Mexican professional wrestling show

- Promotion: International Wrestling Revolution Group
- Date: March 21, 2010
- City: Naucalpan, State of Mexico
- Venue: Arena Naucalpan

Event chronology
← Previous; Guerra del Golfo	Next → Festival de las Máscaras

El Gran Desafío chronology
← Previous; Femenil	Next → 2011

El Gran Desafío (2010) (Spanish for "The Great Challenge") was a professional wrestling supercard event produced by Mexican professional wrestling promotion International Wrestling Revolution Group (IWRG), and took place on March 21, 2010, in Arena Naucalpan, Naucalpan, State of Mexico, Mexico.

In the main event then-IWRG Intercontinental Lightweight Champion Dr. Cerebro defeated El Hijo del Diablo to win the WWS World Welterweight Championship in a match where both championships were on the line. The show included four additional matches.

== Storylines ==
The event featured six professional wrestling matches with different wrestlers involved in pre-existing scripted feuds, plots and storylines. Wrestlers were portrayed as either heels (referred to as rudos in Mexico, those that portray the "bad guys") or faces (técnicos in Mexico, the "good guy" characters) as they followed a series of tension-building events, which culminated in a wrestling match or series of matches.

== Event ==
The show saw several substations compared to the originally announced event, Oficial 911 worked both his scheduled match as well as substituting Veneno in the fourth match of the night. Maldito was originally slated to team with his "La Ola Maldita" partner Samot, but instead he teamed up with Gringo Loco without any explanation for the substitution.

== Aftermath ==
Dr. Cerebro would successfully defend the WWS World Welterweight Championship against Decnnis on September 16, 2010, but ended up losing the championship to Multifacetico on June 2, 2011. He would later have a second reign from June 29 to October 22, 2014.

== Results ==
No.	Results	Stipulations
1	Comando Negro and Eterno defeated Daga and Héros	Best two-out-of-three falls six-man tag team match
2	Gringo Loco and Maldito Jr. defeated Las Traumas (Trauma I and Trauma II)	Best two-out-of-three falls six-man tag team match
3	Chico Che, Freelance, and Leopardo defeated Los Oficiales (Oficial 911, Oficial AK-47, and Oficial Fierro)	Best two-out-of-three falls six-man tag team match
4	Máscara Año 2000, Máscara Año 2000 Jr., and Oficial 911 defeated Bobby Lee Jr., La Roca, and Suicida	Best two-out-of-three falls six-man tag team match
5	Dr. Cerebro (c - IWRG) defeated El Hijo del Diablo (c - WWS)	Singles match for the IWRG Intercontinental Lightweight Championship and the WWS World Welterweight Championship
