= Sin Escape Con Correas =

2014 International Wrestling Revolution Group event

Sin Escape Con Corras
- IWRG poster of the event featuring Eterno, Fuerza Guerrera, Canis Lupus, Dr. Cerebro, Veneno and Diva Salvaje
- Promotion: International Wrestling Revolution Group
- Date: July 9, 2014
- City: Naucalpan, State of Mexico
- Venue: Arena Naucalpan

Event chronology
← Previous; Festival de las Máscaras	Next → Prisión Fatal

Sin Escape Con Correas (Spanish for "No Escape with Straps") was a major professional wrestling event produced and scripted by the Mexican professional wrestling promotion International Wrestling Revolution Group (IWRG), which took place on July 9, 2014, in Arena Naucalpan, Naucalpan, State of Mexico, Mexico, IWRG's home arena. IWRG has previously promoted shows using variations of the name Sin Escape such as La Guerra sin Escape ("The War with no escape") but this event was not turned into a regular themed event.

The name of the event referred to the special main event, a six-man tag team match between the team of Eterno, Fuerza Guerrera, Canis Lupus and the team of Dr. Cerebro, Veneno and Diva Salvaje. As a special added attraction the match was a Lumberjack with leather straps match where other IWRG wrestlers were gathered around the ring, each with a leather strap they were allowed to use on the wrestlers in the match if they left the ring. The semi-main event was a regular Best two-out-of-three falls six-man tag team match with the team known as Los Gringos VIP (Apolo Estrada Jr., Avisman and El Hijo del Diablo) taking on the team of Alan Extreme, Golden Magic, and Metaleon. The three remaining matches were all two-on-two tag team matches, most featured lower ranked or debuting wrestlers.

== Production ==
=== Background ===
The Mexican lucha libre promotion International Wrestling Revolution Group (IWRG; Also referred to as Grupo Internacional Revolución) had held a number of major events in 2014 prior to July starting with the IWRG 18th Anniversary Show on January 1, 2014, followed by their annual tournaments El Protector where a rookie and a veteran team up for a tag team tournament, Rebelión de los Juniors ("The Junior Rebellion") to determine the next challenger for the IWRG Junior de Juniors Championship, Guerra del Golfo ("The Gulf War") where the last man in the steel cage is forced to unmask or have his hair shaved off, and Rey del Ring ("King of the Ring") with the winner receiving the IWRG Rey del Ring Championship. In April IWRG held their semi-regular Prison Fatal ("Deadly Prison") show, headlined by a multi-man steel cage match fought under Luchas de Apuestas, or "bet match" rules and thus had to have all his hair shaved off after the match. The most recent major event prior to Sin Escape Con Correas was IWRG's annual Festival de las Máscaras ("Mask Festival") show celebrating the role of the wrestling mask in lucha libre where wrestlers who had lost a Lucha de Apuestas in the past were allowed to wear their mask for one night.

The Sin Escape Con Correas ("No Escape, with straps") match was headlined by a Best two-out-of-three falls six-man tag team match, fought under "lumberjack" rules, which meant that wrestlers not directly involved in the match would be stationed on the floor around the ring in order to keep the six wrestlers in the ring. For this specific match the lumberjacks were also given leather straps they could use to hit the competitors with, ensuring that they stayed in the ring.

IWRG had previously used the name Sin Escape, as La Guerra sin Escape, held on March 21, 1999, but that show had a steel cage main event. While they have not made the Sin Escape event a regular show they have on several occasions promoted a lumberjack with straps match, often as part of building one or more rivalries leading to a Lucha de Apuesta or 'bet match" where the competitors would bet their hair or mask on the outcome of the match.

=== Storylines ===
The event featured five professional wrestling matches with different wrestlers involved in pre-existing scripted feuds, plots and storylines. Wrestlers portrayed themselves as either heels (referred to as rudos in Mexico, those that portray the "bad guys") or faces (técnicos in Mexico, the "good guy" characters) as they follow a series of tension-building events, which culminated in wrestling matches.

== Event ==
The third match of the night was the first regular IWRG show for IWRG training school graduates Payaso de Plata ("Silver Clown") and Payaso Extremo ("Extreme Clown"), with the clowns losing in two straight falls to Los Oficiales Elite (Oficial Rayan and Oficial Spartan), a well established IWRG tag team.

In during the third fall of the semi-main event, a six-man tag team match between the tecnico team of Alan Extreme, Golden Magic, and Metaleon against the rudo group known as Los Gringos VIP (Apolo Estrada Jr., Avisman and El Hijo del Diablo), El Hijo del Diablo landed a foul hit on Golden Magic and pinned him, seemingly winning the match. Moments later the second IWRG referee called for the result to be reversed, disqualifying Los Gringos VIP for breaking the rules.

For the last match of the night, most of the wrestlers from the first four matches returned to the arena, assembling around the outside of the ring for the lumberjack match. In the main event Fuerza Guerrera was the first wrestler to fall out of the ring and be struck with the leather straps by the lumberjacks, quickly chasing him back inside the ring. After splitting the first two falls between them the main event seemingly was won by the rudo side as Apolo Estrada Jr. interfered behind the referee's back, landing a low blow on rival El Veneno, allowing Eterno to pin him. Like in the semi-main event match the second IWRG referee saw the illegal action and called for the disqualification, giving the victory to El Veneno, Diva Salvaje and Dr. Cerebro.

== Results ==
No.	Results	Stipulations
1	Electro Boy defeated Vampiro Metálico	Best two-out-of-three-falls tag team match
2	Hijo de La Bestia and Zurdog defeated Capitán Muerte and Matrix Jr.	Best two-out-of-three-falls tag team match
3	Los Oficiales Elite (Oficial Rayan and Oficial Spartan) defeated Payaso de Plata and Payaso Extremo	Best two-out-of-three falls tag team match
4	Alan Extreme, Golden Magic, and Metaleon defeated Los Gringos VIP (Apolo Estrada Jr., Avisman and El Hijo del Diablo) by disqualification	Best two-out-of-three falls six-man tag team match
5	Diva Salvaje, Dr. Cerebro and Veneno defeated Canis Lupus, Eterno and Fuerza Guerrera by disqualification	Lumberjack with leather straps match
