= IWRG Prisión Fatal =

International Wrestling Revolution Group event series

Prisión Fatal (English: "Deadly Prison") is both the name of a major show series promoted by the Mexican Lucha Libre, or professional wrestling promotion International Wrestling Revolution Group (IWRG) as well as the name of the match that always main events the show. The Prisión Fatal match is a steel cage match where the participants are chained to the cage, with the last person in the cage being forced to either unmask or have their hair shaved off according to Luchas de Apuestas traditions.

== Event history ==
Starting as far back as at least 1997, the Mexican wrestling promotion International Wrestling Revolution Group (IWRG; Sometimes referred to as Grupo Internacional Revolución in Spanish) has held several annual events where the main event was a multi-man steel cage match where the last wrestler left in the cage would be forced to either remove their wrestling mask or have their hair shaved off under Luchas de Apuestas, or "bet match", rules. In late 2000 IWRG promoted a variation of the steel cage match under the moniker Prisión Fatal ("Deadly Prison"), the first such event to ever bear the name. The Prisión Fatal name would not officially be used for 12 years before the 2012 Prisión Fatal show and then used at intermittent times over the subsequent years, some times twice a year, other time not having a Prisión Fatal show at all. The Prisión Fatal match often has the added stipulation that each competitor is chained by the wrist to the cage with a long steel chain and to escape they fight have to get a key to unlock their chain before they are able to climb out of the cage.

The added chain helps to distinguish it from other Steel cage matches held throughout the year such as the IWRG Guerra del Golfo ("Gulf War"), IWRG Guerra de Sexos ("War of the Sexes") or IWRG El Castillo del Terror ("The Tower of Terror") shows. The Prisión Fatal shows, as well as the majority of the IWRG shows in general, are held in "Arena Naucalpan", owned by the promoters of IWRG and their main arena. So far IWRG has promoted a Prisión Fatal show a total of five times.

A total of 33 wrestlers have competed in a Prisión Fatal match, with only Dr. Cerebro, Oficial Factor, El Hijo de Pirata Morgan and X-Fly have competed in multiple Prisión Fatal matches and X-Fly being the only wrestler to lose two such matches. Factor competed in the 2000 version of the Prisión Fatal show as Súper Mega and later on as Oficial Factor. Rody and Oficial Factor are the only wrestlers to be forced to unmask while Pirata Morgan, X-Fly and Alan Extreme have had their hair shaved off as a result of the match. The six Prisión Fatal shows have hosted more than 27 matches in total, (Note: Records for the first Prisión Fatal in 2000 are incomplete, only verifying two of the matches on the show.) including 4 championship matches. The IWRG Intercontinental Welterweight Championship, IWRG Intercontinental Middleweight Championship and Distrito Federal Trios Championship were all successfully defended while the AIWA Argentinean National Cruiserweight Championship changed hands on the August 2014 version of the Prisión Fatal show.

== Prisión Fatal winners ==
Year	Winner	Loser	Wager	Reference
2000	Burly	Rody	Mask	
2009	Avisman	Suicida	Hair	
2012	Oficial 911	Oficial Factor	Mask	
March 2013	Máscara Año 2000, Jr.	Pirata Morgan	Hair	
June 2013	Dr. Cerebro	Mosco X-Fly	Hair	
May 2014	El Hijo de Pirata Morgan	X-Fly	Hair	
August 2014	Ciclon Black	Alan Extreme	Hair	
January 2017	Imposible	Pirata Morgan Jr.	Mask	
July 2017	Carístico	Black Warrior	Hair	

== Dates, venues, and main events ==
Event	Date	City	Venue	Main event	Ref.
2000	March 2, 2000	Naucalpan, Mexico State	Arena Naucalpan	Black Dragón vs Burly vs. Cyborg vs. Dr. Cerebro vs. El Felino vs. Guardia vs. Maniacop vs. Oficial vs. Rody vs. Súper Mega vs. Último Vampiro, vs. Villano III	
2009	June 5, 2009	Naucalpan, Mexico State	Arena Naucalpan	Avisman vs. Bushi vs. Freelance vs. Suicida	
2012	December 2, 2012	Naucalpan, Mexico State	Arena Naucalpan	Factor vs. El Hijo de Pirata Morgan vs. El Hijo de Máscara Año 2000 vs. Oficial 911	
March 2013	March 17, 2013	Naucalpan, Mexico State	Arena Naucalpan	Pirata Morgan vs. Máscara Año 2000, Jr. vs. Rayo de Jalisco, Jr. vs. Cien Caras, Jr.	
June 2013	March 17, 2013	Naucalpan, Mexico State	Arena Naucalpan	Dr. Cerebro vs. X-Fly	
May 2014	May 25, 2014	Naucalpan, Mexico State	Arena Naucalpan	El Hijo de Pirata Morgan vs. X-Fly vs. Eterno vs. El Hijo de Máscara Año 2000	
August 2014	August 27, 2014	Naucalpan, Mexico State	Arena Naucalpan	Ciclon Black vs. Alan Extreme vs. Chucho el Roto vs. Golden Magic vs. Metaleón vs. Relámpago vs. Tony Rivera vs. Yakuza	
January 2017	January 1, 2017	Naucalpan, Mexico State	Arena Naucalpan	Imposible vs. Pirata Morgan Jr. vs. Golden Magic vs. Relámpago	
July 2017	July 23, 2017	Naucalpan, Mexico State	Arena Naucalpan	Carístico vs. Black Warrior vs. Trauma II vs. Mr. Electro	
