= Prisión Fatal (May 2014) =

2014 International Wrestling Revolution Group event

- Official poster of the event displaying (clockwise) Eterno, El Hijo de Pirata Morgan X-Fly and El Hijo de Máscara Año 2000
- Promotion: International Wrestling Revolution Group
- Date: May 25, 2014
- City: Naucalpan, State of Mexico
- Venue: Arena Naucalpan

Event chronology
← Previous; Rey del Ring	Next → Festival de las Máscaras

IWRG Prisión Fatal chronology
← Previous; June 2013	Next → August 2014

Prisión Fatal (May 2014) was a professional wrestling major event, produced by the Mexico based International Wrestling Revolution Group (IWRG) professional wrestling promotion. The event took on May 25, 2014, at "Arena Naucalpan" in Naucalpan, State of Mexico, IWRG's main venue. The show was the third overall show promoted under the Prisión Fatal name and the first of two shows in 2014 billed as Prisión Fatal. The main event was the eponymous Prisión Fatal (Spanish for "Deadly Prison") Steel cage match where the last person remaining in the cage was forced to unmasked or shaved bald as per the match stipulation. The Prisión Fatal match included Eterno, El Hijo de Pirata Morgan, El Hijo de Máscara Año 2000 and X-Fly. El Hijo de Máscara Año 2000 was the only masked wrestler in the cage risking his mask while the remaining three wrestlers put their hair on the line on the outcome of the match. The match ended when El Hijo de Pirata Morgan was the third man to leave the ring, forcing X-Fly to have his hair shaved off as a result.

== Production ==
=== Background ===
Starting as far back as at least 2000, the Mexican wrestling promotion International Wrestling Revolution Group (IWRG; Sometimes referred to as Grupo Internacional Revolución in Spanish) has held several annual events where the main event was a multi-man steel cage match where the last wrestler left in the cage would be forced to either remove their wrestling mask or have their hair shaved off under Lucha de Apuestas, or "bet match", rules. From 2012 IWRG has promoted a variation of the steel cage match under the moniker Prisión Fatal ("Deadly Prison") at least once a year since its inception. The Prisión Fatal has the added twist that each competitor is chained by the wrist to the cage with a long steel chain and to escape they fight have to get a key to unlock their chain before they are able to escape. The added chain helps to distinguish it from other Steel cage matches held throughout the year such as the IWRG Guerra del Golfo ("Gulf War"), IWRG Guerra de Sexos ("War of the Sexes") or IWRG El Castillo del Terror ("The Tower of Terror") shows. The Prisión Fatal shows, as well as the majority of the IWRG shows in general, are held in "Arena Naucalpan", owned by the promoters of IWRG and their main arena. The May 2014 Prisión Fatal show was the third time that IWRG promoted a show under that name.

=== Storylines ===
The event featured five professional wrestling matches with different wrestlers involved in pre-existing scripted feuds, plots and storylines. Wrestlers were portrayed as either heels (referred to as rudos in Mexico, those that portray the "bad guys") or faces (técnicos in Mexico, the "good guy" characters) as they followed a series of tension-building events, which culminated in a wrestling match or series of matches.

== Results ==
No.	Results	Stipulations
1	Alfa defeated Anubis Black	Best two-out-of-three falls match
2	Latigo and Omega defeated Ciclon Black and Hip Hop Man	Tag Team match
3	Dr. Cerebro, Golden Magic and Imposible defeated Los Oficiales (Oficial 911, Oficial AK-47 and Oficial Fierro)	Best two-out-of-three falls six-man tag team match
4	Demon Clown and Las Traumas (Trauma I and Trauma II) defeated El Hijo de Dos Caras, Relámpago and Super Nova	Best two-out-of-three falls six-man tag team match
5	El Hijo de Pirata Morgan defeated X-Fly; Also in the match: Eterno and El Hijo de Máscara Año 2000	Prisión Fatal Steel cage match

=== Order of escape ===
1. El Hijo de Máscara Año 2000
2. Eterno
3. El Hijo de Pirata Morgan
