= Festival de las Máscaras (2014) =

2014 International Wrestling Revolution Group event

- Official poster of the event showing Dr. Wagner Jr., L.A. Park and Dos Caras
- Promotion: International Wrestling Revolution Group
- Date: June 15, 2014
- City: Naucalpan, State of Mexico
- Venue: Arena Naucalpan

Event chronology
← Previous; Prisión Fatal	Next → Sin Escape Con Correas

IWRG Festival de las Máscaras chronology
← Previous; 2013	Next → 2015

Festival de las Máscaras (2014) (Spanish for "Festival of the Mask") was an annual professional wrestling major event produced by Mexican professional wrestling promotion International Wrestling Revolution Group (IWRG), which took place on June 15, 2014 in Arena Naucalpan, Naucalpan, State of Mexico, Mexico. For this annual event IWRG has gotten special permission from the "Comisión de Box y Lucha Libre Mexico D.F." (Mexico City Boxing and Wrestling Commission) to allow wrestlers who had previously been unmasked after losing a Luchas de Apuestas, or bet match, to wear their masks again for this show only. The event also celebrated the career of Dos Caras, father of IWRG Intercontinental Heavyweight Champion El Hijo de Dos Caras.

== Production ==
=== Background ===
The wrestling mask has always held a sacred place in lucha libre, carrying with it a mystique and anonymity beyond what it means to wrestlers elsewhere in the world. The ultimate humiliation a luchador can suffer is to lose a Lucha de Apuestas, or bet match. Following a loss in a Lucha de Apuesta match the masked wrestler would be forced to unmask, state their real name and then would be unable to wear that mask while wrestling anywhere in Mexico. Since 2007 the Mexican wrestling promotion International Wrestling Revolution Group (IWRG; Sometimes referred to as Grupo Internacional Revolución in Spanish) has held a special annual show where they received a waiver to the rule from the State of Mexico Wrestling Commission and wrestlers would be allowed to wear the mask they previously lost in a Lucha de Apuestas. The annual Festival de las Máscaras ("Festival of the Masks") event is also partly a celebration or homage of lucha libre history with IWRG honoring wrestlers of the past. The IWRG's Festival de las Máscaras shows, as well as the majority of the IWRG shows in general, are held in "Arena Naucalpan", owned by the promoters of IWRG and their main arena. The 2012 Festival de las Máscaras show was the sixth year in a row IWRG held the show.

=== Storylines ===
The event featured five professional wrestling matches with different wrestlers involved in pre-existing scripted feuds, plots and storylines. Wrestlers were portrayed as either heels (referred to as rudos in Mexico, those that portray the "bad guys") or faces (técnicos in Mexico, the "good guy" characters) as they followed a series of tension-building events, which culminated in a wrestling match or series of matches.

Previously unmasked wrestlers

Name	Lost mask to	Date	Note
Bombero Infernal	El Pantera	December 7, 1997	
Dr. Cerebro	El Hijo del Santo	March 1, 2001	
Eterno	El Forastero and Estigma	July 20, 2008	
El Hijo del Diablo	Místico	December 1, 2006	
Oficial 911	Golden Magic and El Hijo de Pirata Morgan	December 19, 2013	
Oficial AK-47	Trauma I	December 22, 2011	

== Results ==
No.	Results	Stipulations
1	Guerrero Mixto, Jr., Hip Hop Man and Tony Rivera defeated Black Terry, Imposible and Metaleón	Best two-out-of-three falls six-man tag team match
2	Bombero Infernal, Dr. Cerebro and Golden Magic defeated Astro Rey, Jr., Canis Lups and Eterno	Best two-out-of-three falls six-man tag team match
3	Los Oficiales (Oficial 911 and Oficial AK-47) defeated Los Gringos VIP (Apolo Estrada, Jr. and El Hijo del Diablo) (C) – two falls to one	Best two-out-of-three falls match for the IWRG Intercontinental Tag Team Championship
4	Mascara Sagrada, Relámpago and Super Nova defeated Demon Clown and Las Traumas (Trauma I and Trauma II) – two falls to one	Best two-out-of-three falls six-man tag team match
5	Dr. Wagner, Jr., El Hijo de Dos Caras defeated L.A. Park and Pirata Morgan – two falls to one	Best two-out-of-three falls six-man tag team match
