= Prisión Fatal (June 2013) =

2013 International Wrestling Revolution Group event

- Official poster for the event featuring X-Fly and Dr. Cerebro as well as El Hijo del Pirata Morgan and Hijo del Máscara Año 2000
- Promotion: International Wrestling Revolution Group
- Date: June 23, 2013
- City: Naucalpan, State of Mexico
- Venue: Arena Naucalpan

Event chronology
← Previous; Rey del Ring	Next → Festival de las Máscaras

IWRG Prisión Fatal chronology
← Previous; March 2013	Next → May 2014

Prisión Fatal (June 2013) was an annually recurring major professional wrestling event, produced by the Mexico based International Wrestling Revolution Group (IWRG) professional wrestling promotion. The event took on June 23, 2013, at "Arena Naucalpan" in Naucalpan, State of Mexico, IWRG's main venue. The show was the third overall show promoted under the Prisión Fatal name and the first of two shows in 2014 billed as Prisión Fatal. The main event was the eponymous Prisión Fatal (Spanish for "Deadly Prison") Steel cage match where the last person remaining in the cage was forced to unmasked or shaved bald as per the match stipulation. The Prisión Fatal match saw Dr. Cerebro face off against X-Fly where the two competitors were chained together by a long steel change that was attached to a dog collar around their necks. In the end Dr. Cerebro defeated X-Fly and forced him to have all his hair shaved off after the match.

== Production ==
=== Background ===
Starting as far back as at least 2000, the Mexican wrestling promotion International Wrestling Revolution Group (IWRG; Sometimes referred to as Grupo Internacional Revolución in Spanish) has held several annual events where the main event was a multi-man steel cage match where the last wrestler left in the cage would be forced to either remove their wrestling mask or have their hair shaved off under Lucha de Apuestas, or "bet match", rules. From 2012 IWRG has promoted a variation of the steel cage match under the moniker Prisión Fatal ("Deadly Prison") at least once a year since its inception. The Prisión Fatal has the added twist that each competitor is chained by the wrist to the cage with a long steel chain and to escape they fight have to get a key to unlock their chain before they are able to escape. The added chain helps to distinguish it from other Steel cage matches held throughout the year such as the IWRG Guerra del Golfo ("Gulf War"), IWRG Guerra de Sexos ("War of the Sexes") or IWRG El Castillo del Terror ("The Tower of Terror") shows. The Prisión Fatal shows, as well as the majority of the IWRG shows in general, are held in "Arena Naucalpan", owned by the promoters of IWRG and their main arena. The June 2013 Prisión Fatal show was the third time that IWRG promoted a show under that name.

=== Storylines ===
The event featured five professional wrestling matches with different wrestlers involved in pre-existing scripted feuds, plots and storylines. Wrestlers were portrayed as either heels (referred to as rudos in Mexico, those that portray the "bad guys") or faces (técnicos in Mexico, the "good guy" characters) as they followed a series of tension-building events, which culminated in a wrestling match or series of matches.

== Results ==
No.	Results	Stipulations
1	Acero and Seiya defeated Dragón Celestial and Epidemia	Best two-out-of-three falls match tag team match
2	Dragoncito de Oro, Mini Multifacético and Voladorcito defeated Bracito de Plata, Mini Canis Lupus and Súper Bracito	Best two-out-of-three falls six-man tag team match
3	La Familia de Tijuana (Eterno and Súper Nova) vs. La Dinastía de la Muerte (Trauma I and Trauma II) ended in a double disqualification	Best two-out-of-three falls tag team match
4	El Hijo del Pirata Morgan (c) defeated Hijo del Máscara Año 2000	Best two-out-of-three falls match for the IWRG Intercontinental Middleweight Championship
5	Dr. Cerebro defeated X-Fly	Prisión Fatal "Bull Terrier" Steel cage match
(c) / – the champion(s) heading into the match
