= La Jaula de Las Locas (2015) =

2015 International Wrestling Revolution Group event

IWRG La Jaula de Las Locas
- Official poster for the event showing six of the men and women who risked their hair or mask in the main event.
- Promotion: International Wrestling Revolution Group
- Date: June 7, 2015 (aired June 8, 2015)
- City: Naucalpan, State of Mexico
- Venue: Arena Naucalpan

Event chronology
| ← Previous; Guerra Revolucionaria | Next → Guerra de Escuelas |

La Jaula de Las Locas (Spanish lit. "The Cage of the Crazy Ones", a reference to the Spanish title of La Cage aux Folles) was a special professional wrestling event produced by the International Wrestling Revolution Group (IWRG), that took place on June 7, 2015 at Arena Naucalpan in Naucalpan, State of Mexico. The focal point of the show and the inspiration for the event name was the main event steel cage match, an inter-gender match that saw both female wrestlers and male Exótico (drag wrestlers) compete against each other. The cage match was contested under Luchas de Apuestas, or "bet match", rules where the last wrestler in the cage would be deemed the loser, losing either their wrestling mask or their hair if they were already unmasked.

== Production ==
=== Background ===
Starting as far back as at least 2000, the Mexican wrestling promotion International Wrestling Revolution Group (IWRG; Sometimes referred to as Grupo Internacional Revolución in Spanish) has held several annual events where the main event was a multi-man steel cage match where the last wrestler left in the cage would be forced to either remove their wrestling mask or have their hair shaved off under Lucha de Apuestas, or "bet match", rules. Starting in 2011 IWRG began holding a special version of the steel cage match concept under the name Guerra de Sexos, or "War of the Sexes", as they held a show centered on an inter-gender steel cage match main event that saw men and women fight each other with their mask or hair on the line. In 2015 IWRG held a cage match that featured only female wrestlers and Exótico or drag wrestlers in the cage, branding it as La Jaula de las Locas ("The Cage of the Crazy Ones") instead of Guerra de Sexos. IWRG has not announced plans to hold a Guerra de Sexos show in 2015, replacing it with La Jaula de las Locas instead. The La Jaula de las Locas shows, as well as the majority of the IWRG shows in general, are held in "Arena Naucalpan", owned by the promoters of IWRG and their main arena. The 2011 Guerra de Sexos show was the first year IWRG promoted a show under that name.

=== Storylines ===
The event featured five professional wrestling matches with different wrestlers involved in pre-existing scripted feuds, plots and storylines. Wrestlers were portrayed as either heels (referred to as rudos in Mexico, those that portray the "bad guys") or faces (técnicos in Mexico, the "good guy" characters) as they followed a series of tension-building events, which culminated in a wrestling match or series of matches.

== Event ==
After eight other wrestlers climbed out of the steel cage the main event came down to IWRG regular Exótico wrestler La Diva Salvaje and Exótico wrestler Bello Caligula who was making his IWRG debut that night. In the end La Diva Salvaje won the match, forcing Bello CAligula to unmask. After unmasking Caligula announced that his name was Mario Roberto Martinez Sanchez from Mexico City, 19 years old at the time of unmasking and stated that he had been a wrestler for three years prior to the match. No records have been found of anyone under the name "Bello Caligula" had wrestled prior to the show, which means he either used a different identity or only worked small town independent circuit shows will little coverage previously.

== Results ==
| No. | Results | Stipulations |
|---|---|---|
| 1^{D} | Los Insanity (Araña de Plata and Atomic Star) defeated Aeroman and Alas de Acero | Tag team Best two-out-of-three falls match |
| 2 | Metaleón, Skayde and Vaquero Jr. defeated Black Sugar, Douki and Imposible | Best two-out-of-three falls six-man tag team match |
| 3 | Los Terribles Cerebros (Black Terry, Cerebro Negro and Dr. Cerebro) defeated Hip Hop Man and Los Gringos VIP (Apolo Estrada Jr. and El Hijo del Diablo) | Best two-out-of-three falls six-man tag team match |
| 4 | Alan Extreme, Eterno and Heddi Karaoui defeated Super Nova, Veneno and X-Fly | Best two-out-of-three falls six-man tag team match |
| 5 | La Diva Salvaje defeated Bello Caligula; Also in the match: Chica Yeye, Cristal, Diosa Atenea, El Demasiado, Estrella Divina, Miss Gaviota, Sexy Girl and Vaneli | Jaula de las Locas intergender ten-person steel cage match, Luchas de Apuestas, mask or hair match |
D / – this was a dark match

La Jaula de las Locas order of escape

1. Cristal
2. Estrella Divina
3. Sexy Girl
4. Chica Yeye
5. Diosa Atenea
6. El Demasiado
7. Miss Gaviota
8. Vaneli
9. La Diva Salvaje
