= El Gran Desafío (2011) =

2011 International Wrestling Revolution Group event

- Promotion: International Wrestling Revolution Group
- Date: July 17, 2011
- City: Naucalpan, State of Mexico
- Venue: Arena Naucalpan

Event chronology
← Previous; Festival de las Máscaras	Next → La Jaula de la Muerte

El Gran Desafío chronology
← Previous; 2010	Next → —

El Gran Desafío (2011) (Spanish for "The Great Challenge") was a major professional wrestling event produced and scripted by the Mexican Lucha libre promotion International Wrestling Revolution Group (IWRG) on July 17, 2011. The event was held in Arena Naucalpan, IWRG's home arena and the venue for the majority of their shows and was the third and final show held under the El Gran Desafío name.

The main event of the show was a best two-out-of-three-falls Lucha de Apuestas, or "bet match" where both Oficial 911 and Multifacético risked their wrestling mask on the outcome of the match. Oficial 911 won, partially with help from Oficial Spartan, forcing Multifacético to unmask and reveal his real name. The show included four additional matches.

== Production ==
=== Background ===
The Mexican lucha libre or professional wrestling promotion International Wrestling Revolution Group (IWRG; at times referred to as Grupo Internacional Revolución in Mexico) holds almost all of their major wrestling shows in Arena Naucalpan, in Naucalpan, State of Mexico, an arena owned and operated by the Moreno family who also owns and operates IWRG. The most prestigious match type in lucha libre is the Lucha de Apuestas (literally "Bet match") where each competitors "bets" either their wrestling mask or their hair on the outcome of the match. The Lucha de Apuestas format was created in 1940, with the first match of its type held on July 14, 1940 where the unmasked Octavio Gaona defeated the masked El Murciélago Enmascarado ("The Masked Bat"), forcing El Murciélago to unmask. Since then the Luchas de Apuestas match has become more important, more prestigious than championship matches with the Lucha de Apuestas matches normally headlining major lucha libre shows.

On July 22, 2009 IWRG held their first El Gran Desafío ("The Great Challenge") major show, with the focal point being a Lucha de Apuestas between IWRG regular Dr. Cerebro and Super-X representative and owner Juventud Guerrera, won by Juventud Guerrera. Four months later IWRG once again used the El Gran Desafío name for a show, this time holding a show called El Gran Desafío Femenil – Sin Empate, Sin Indulto (Spanish for "The Great Women's Challenge – No restrictions, no reprieve") with the focal point being a women's professional wrestling main event where Mexican wrestler Flor Metálica defeated Japanese wrestler Atsuko Emoto in a Lucha de Apuestas match, forting Emoto to be shaved bald. The third El Gran Desafío show was held in 2011, the last time IWRG held a match under such a name.

=== Storylines ===
The event featured five professional wrestling matches with different wrestlers involved in pre-existing scripted feuds, plots and storylines. Wrestlers were portrayed as either heels (referred to as rudos in Mexico, those that portray the "bad guys") or faces (técnicos in Mexico, the "good guy" characters) as they followed a series of tension-building events, which culminated in a wrestling match or series of matches.

In 1999 IWRG introduced a masked tecnico character known as Multifacético ("Multi-faceted"), a fan favorite character that wore a bring colorful mask and body suit resembling a super hero. In late 1999 the wrestler portraying Multifacético was killed in a car crash. IWRG would later use the Multifacético once more, giving the mask to the wrestler formerly known as Bruly. In 2003 he changed ring characters and became known as "Zonik 2000". In 2007 another Multifacético was introduced, unofficially referred to as "Multifacético III".The heavy focus on the inexperienced, and at times accident prone Multifacético saw the fans react in the opposite way, booing him instead of supporting him. With time his in-ring skills improved and his long running feud with Black Terry eventually showed that he had wrestling skills and the two put on some of the best IWRG matches in 2008 according to SuperLuchas Magazine. The third Multifacético left IWRG in 2009 and became known as Guerrero Maya Jr. in Consejo Mundial de Lucha Libre (CMLL). In January 2011 IWRG brought the Multifacético character back once more and had him win the WWS World Welterweight Championship.

== Event ==
The opening match, a tag team match, where IWRG trainees Dark Devil and Guerrero 2000 defeated Rolling Boy and Tonatiuh was described as "not good" by the match reports. The second match of the night, a traditional lucha libre best two-out-of-three-falls six-man tag team match was observed by a panel of three judges similar to Idols television series. When the time limit expired without a pinfall the panel deemed that the trio of Bugambilia del Norte, Dragón Fly and Saruman had defeated Alan Extreme, El Imposible and Keshin Black by putting on the better performance. During the third match of the night, a six-man tag team match, Carta Brava Jr. had to be taken from the ring on a stretcher after one of his opponents accidentally struck him too hard, driving a knee into the chest of Carta Brava Jr. In the end the técnico team of El Centvrión, Dinamic Black and Golden Magic defeated King Drako and El Polifacético who were now down one man.

The fourth match was originally scheduled to have Angélico and Veneno team up with El Pantera, but for unexplained reasons El Ángel and Máscara Año 2000 Jr. replaced them on the técnico side as they took on, and lost to Los Perros del Mal ("The Bad Dogs"; Damián 666, Halloween and X-Fly). In the final fall, Halloween had been eliminated from the match, but snuck back in the ring behind the referee's back, then pulled the mask off Máscara Año 2000 Jr., distracting him enough to allow Damián 666 to roll the now unmasked Máscara Año 2000 Jr. for the third and deciding fall.

For the main event Lucha de Apuestas match Oficial 911 was accompanied by the most recent addition to the Los Oficiales group, Oficial Spartan. Multifacético had Pantera work as his corner man, trying to keep Los Oficials in check. During the match, Multifacético won the first fall, but lost the second and third fall, the last one when Oficial Spartan helped his tag team partner cheat. Oficial AK-47 and Oficial Fierro, joined in the in-ring celebrations as Multifacético was forced to unmask. After unmasking Multifacético revealed that his real name was Jonathan Pacheco, that he was from the State of Mexico and had been a professional wrestler for seven years at that point in time. He had previously wrestled under the name "Magia Negra" ("Black Magic").

== Aftermath ==
Pacheco continued to work as Multifacético for IWRG for another year after the El Gran Desafío show, participating in the 2012 Rey del Ring ("King of the Ring") tournament, as well as the 2012 La Gran Cruzada ("The Great Crusade") tournament. No records of Multifacético working for IWRG, or anywhere else since 2012 has been found. Multifacético's name appears only on one single show in 2015, which means Pacheco either retired from lucha libre or adopted a new ring name.

== Results ==
No.	Results	Stipulations
1	Dark Devil and Guerrero 2000 defeated Rolling Boy and Tonatiuh	Best two-out-of-three-falls tag team match
2	Bugambilia del Norte, Dragón Fly and Saruman defeated Alan Extreme, El Imposible and Keshin Black by judges decision	Best two-out-of-three-falls six-man tag team match
3	El Centvrión, Dinamic Black and Golden Magic defeated Carta Brava Jr., King Drako and El Polifacético	Best two-out-of-three-falls six-man tag team match
4	Los Perros del Mal (Damián 666, Halloween and X-Fly) defeated El Ángel, El Pantera and Máscara Año 2000 Jr.	Best two-out-of-three-falls six-man tag team match
5	Oficial 911 defeated Multifacético	Best two-out-of-three-falls Lucha de Apuestas, mask vs. mask match
