= Guerra Revolucionaria (2009) =

2009 International Wrestling Revolution Group event

- Promotion: International Wrestling Revolution Group
- Date: March 29, 2009
- City: Naucalpan, State of Mexico
- Venue: Arena Naucalpan

Event chronology
← Previous; Caravana de Campeones	Next → El Gran Desafío

Guerra Revolucionaria chronology
← Previous; First	Next → 2010

The Guerra Revolucionaria (2009) (Spanish for "Revolutionary War") show was the first of a series of major professional wrestling events produced and scripted by the Mexican professional wrestling promotion International Wrestling Revolution Group (IWRG) under the name Guerra Revolucionaria. The event took place on March 29, 2009 in Arena Naucalpan, Naucalpan, State of Mexico, Mexico. The main event of the show was a 20-man Battle Royal where the eliminated wrestlers would all remain at ringside, act as "Lumberjacks" to ensure none of the participants left the ring. Each lumberjack would be given a leather straps they were allowed to use on the still-active competitors. There was no official prize for winning the match other than the increased public profile of the winning wrestler.

The main event Guerra Revolucionaria was won by Trauma I as he eliminated Oficial 911 as the last man in the match. The show included three additional matches, a Best two-out-of-three falls six-person tag team match, a tag team match and a singles match

== Production ==
=== Background ===
Beginning in 2009 the Mexican wrestling promotion International Wrestling Revolution Group (IWRG; Sometimes referred to as Grupo Internacional Revolución in Spanish) held an annual show called Guerra Revolucionaria ("The Revolutionary War"), a reference to the Mexican revolutionary war (1810–1821). The main event match, the eponymous Guerra Revolucionaria, a 20-man "over the top" Battle Royal where all 20 wrestlers start out in the ring. Once a wrestler is thrown over the top rope to the floor that wrestler is eliminated from the actual match, from that point on they will act as a "Lumberjack" outside the ring, ensuring that none of remaining competitors try to escape the ring. Each "lumberjack" is given a leather strap that they are allowed to use on anyone that leaves the ring. There is no specific "award" for winning the Guerra Revolucionaria tournament. The multi-man match often allows IWRG to intersect various ongoing storylines as another step in the escalating tension. At other times, the match itself was used as a way to start new feuds due to interactions inside or outside the ring. The Guerra Revolucionaria shows, as well as the majority of the IWRG shows in general, are held in Arena Naucalpan, owned by the promoters of IWRG, and it is their main venue.

=== Storylines ===
The event featured four professional wrestling matches with different wrestlers, where some were involved in pre-existing scripted feuds or storylines, others simply put together by the matchmakers without a backstory. Being a professional wrestling event matches are not won legitimately through athletic competition; they are instead won via predetermined outcomes to the matches that is kept secret from the general public. Wrestlers portray either heels (the bad guys, referred to as Rudos in Mexico) or faces (fan favorites or Técnicos in Mexico).

== Event ==
The opening match was a Best two-out-of-three-falls singles match where rookie Garra del Águila defeated Keshin Black. Sources disagree on who won the second match of the night, a Best two-out-of-three-falls tag team match, some sources lists Arafath and Judás el Traidor as the winner, while other sources lists Latin Brother and the Exótico Miss Gaviota as the winning team.

In the third match of the night, a traditional lucha libre Best two-out-of-three falls six-person tag team match NWA Mexico representative Turbo teamed up with IWRG regulars El Gemelo Fantastico II and Trauma II to defeat NWA Mexico wrestler Black Thunder and IWRG regulars Oficial Fierro and El Hijo del Signo two falls to one.

For the main event, all twenty wrestlers were introduced and brought to the ring before the bell rang, starting the match out without any "Lumberjacks" on the floor. The reported order of elimination was: 1) Tetsuya Bushi, 2) Toxico, 3) Freelance, 4) Multifacético IV, 5) Xibalba, 6) Andy Barrow 7) Cerebro Negro, 8) Capitan Muerte, 9), Chico Che, 10) Universo 2000, 11) Bobby Lee Jr., 12) Pierroth II, 13) Hijo de Pierroth, 14) Máscara Año 2000 Jr., 15) Arlequín, 16) Zatura, 17) Dr. Cerebro, 18) Gemelo Fantastico I, 19) Oficial 911. The match was won by Trauma I as he eliminated his Los Oficiales rival Oficial 911 by throwing him over the top rope to the floor.

== Aftermath ==
The win for Trauma I was one of his earliest successes in IWRG and a sign that IWRG considered him more than simply a tag team wrestler as part of Los Traumas (with his older brother Trauma II). The two, often teaming with their father Negro Navarro, became IWRG main stays over the years with Trauma I winning IWRG Junior de Juniors Championship by himself, winning the IWRG Intercontinental Tag Team Championship with both Negro Navarro, and Trauma II, and the IWRG Intercontinental Trios Championship with both, under the name La Dinastia de la Muerte ("The Dynasty of Death").

The feud between Los Traumas and Los Oficiales continued to build over the following year, leading to a Lucha de Apuestas, or "bet match" at the Arena Naucalpan 34th Anniversary Show. The match was set up as a Relevos Suicidas match where rival Trauma I teamed up with Oficial AK-47 while Trauma II teamed up with Oficial 911. The losing team, Trauma I and Oficial AK-47 in this case, were then forced to face off with their masks on the line. In the end Trauma I pinned Oficial AK-47, forcing him to unmask and state his real name, Mario Pardo Villagómez.

== Results ==
No.	Results	Stipulations
1	Garra del Águila defeated Keshin Black	Best two-out-of-three-falls singles match
2	Latin Brother and Miss Gaviota defeated Arafath and Judás el Traidor	Best two-out-of-three-falls tag team match
3	El Gemelo Fantastico II, Trauma II and Turbo defeated Black Thunder, Oficial Fierro and El Hijo del Signo	Best two-out-of-three falls six-person tag team match
4	Trauma I won the Guerra Revolucionaria; Also in the match: Oficial 911, Andy Barrow, Arlequín, Bobby Lee Jr., Capitán Muerte, Cerebro Negro, Chico Che, Dr. Cerebro, Freelance, El Gemelo Fantastico I, El Hijo del Pierroth, Máscara Año 2000 Jr., Multifacético, Pierroth #2, Tetsuya Bushi, Tóxico, Universo 2000, Xibalba and Zatura	20-Man Battle Royal, Lumberjack's with leather straps match
