= Prisión Fatal (2000) =

2000 International Wrestling Revolution Group event

- Promotion: International Wrestling Revolution Group
- Date: February 3, 2000
- City: Naucalpan, State of Mexico
- Venue: Arena Naucalpan

Event chronology
← Previous; IWRG 4th Anniversary Show	Next → El Castillo del Terror

Prisión Fatal chronology
← Previous; First	Next → 2012

The 2000 Prisión Fatal (Spanish for "Deadly Prison") was a major lucha libre event produced and scripted by the Mexican International Wrestling Revolution Group (IWRG) professional wrestling promotion on February 3, 2000. The 2000 Prisión Fatal show was the first confirmed IWRG show that used the name, with it becoming a regular event with the 2012 Prisión Fatal show. The main event was the eponymous Prisión Fatal Steel cage match where the last person remaining in the cage was forced to unmasked per the match stipulation.

Due to incomplete written records on the show only two matches have been confirmed within it, including the 12-man steel cage match main event. The Prisión Fatal came down to tag team partners Rody and Burly (members of Los Super Payasos trio) who had to fight to keep their masks safe. In the end Burly escaped the cage and Rody had to unmask as a result.

== Production ==
=== Background ===
The Mexican wrestling promotion International Wrestling Revolution Group (IWRG, sometimes referred to as Grupo Internacional Revolución in Spanish) has a long-standing history of holding major event focused on a multi-man steel cage match where the last wrestler left in the cage would be forced to either remove their wrestling mask or have their hair shaved off or even give up his title belt under Lucha de Apuestas, or "bet match", rules. The first confirmed Lucha de Apuestas steel cage match took place in 1997, during the first year of IWRG's existence.

Starting in 2000, IWRG has on occasion promoted a variation of the steel cage match under the moniker Prisión Fatal ("Deadly Prison"). The Prisión Fatal name predates other IWRG steel cage match shows held by IWRG throughout the year, such as the IWRG Guerra del Golfo ("Gulf War"), IWRG Guerra de Sexos ("War of the Sexes"), or IWRG El Castillo del Terror ("The Tower of Terror") shows. The Prisión Fatal shows, as well as the majority of the IWRG shows in general, are held in Arena Naucalpan, owned by the promoters of IWRG and their main arena. The 2000 Prisión Fatal show was the first time that IWRG promoted a show under that name, and it was not used again until the 2012 Prisión Fatal show.

=== Storylines ===
The event featured at least two, and most likely more, professional wrestling matches with different wrestlers involved in pre-existing scripted feuds, plots and storylines. Wrestlers were portrayed as either heels (referred to as rudos in Mexico, those that portray the "bad guys") or faces (técnicos in Mexico, the "good guy" characters) as they followed a series of tension-building events, which culminated in a wrestling match or series of matches.

In 1996 IWRG created a new faction known as Los Oficiales ("The Officials", a trio of policemen) as they paired up Maniac Cop, Oficial and Vigilante on a regular basis. The trio won the Distrito Federal Trios Championship in 1996 although records are not clear on who they defeated to win the championship. The rudo trio was soon paired up against Los Super Payasos ("The Super Clowns"; Burly, Rody and Circus), three masked wrestlers in clown costumes. The fan favorite clowns and the "evil policemen" worked a long-running storyline against each other, including Los Super Payasos winning the Distrito Federal Trios Championship on two separate occasions, first in 1997 and then again in 1999. In early 2000 Los Oficiales won the Distrito Federal Trios Championship from Los Super Payasos in the lead up to the Prisión Fatal show.

While Los Oficiales had been involved in a long-running feud with Los Super Payasos between 1997 and 2000, it was not the only major storyline Los Oficiales were involved in. In 1998 Maniaccop turned on his tag team partners and sided with Cyborg Cop and Vader Cop to form a similarly themed trio known as La Escuadron de la Muerte ("The Death Squad"). In early 2000, the storyline feud was still ongoing, leading to the inclusion of Guardia, Oficial, Maniacop and Cyborg Cop in the steel cage match in addition to both Rody and Burly from Los Super Payasos.

== Event ==
Printed records from the time period were not complete when it comes to lucha libre results from the second tier wrestling promotions which means that no confirmation has been found of exactly how many matches were on the show. In subsequent years, IWRG has used a five-match format for their steel cage match shows, but it is unclear if this was the case for the first Prisión Fatal show.

The main event Prisión Fatal steel cage match included 12 wrestlers in total and had a 10-minute time limit, where all wrestlers had to remain in the ring before they would be allowed to climb over the top of the cage to safety. The order of which the wrestlers escaped the cage has not been documented, only that the match came down to tag team partners Burly and Rody as all other wrestlers escaped the cage. In the end, Burly defeated Rody, forcing Rody to remove his clown mask and state his name, Simon Tlantenchi.

== Aftermath ==
Los Super Payasos remained a unit even after the mask loss, but their prominence in IWRG was reduced, no longer in contention for the Distrito Federal Trios championship. On April 16, 2000, Rody lost a Lucha de Apuestas match to Cyborg and thus had to have his hair shaved off as well. By late 2000, Los Super Payasos left IWRG. Burly would later work for IWRG under the masked identity "Zonik 2000", as well as become the second wrestler to use the name Multifacético.

=== Results ===
No.	Results	Stipulations
1	Fantasy, Mike Segura and Súper Ratón defeated Bombero Infernal, El Millonario and Vader Cop	Best two-out-of-three-falls six-man tag team match
2	Burly defeated Rody; Also in the match: Black Dragón, Cyborg, Dr. Cerebro, El Felino, Guardia, Maniacop, Oficial, Súper Mega, Último Vampiro, and Villano III	Prisión Fatal Steel cage match
