= Guerra Revolucionaria (2010) =

2010 International Wrestling Revolution Group event

- Promotion: International Wrestling Revolution Group
- Date: October 31, 2010
- City: Naucalpan, State of Mexico
- Venue: Arena Naucalpan

Event chronology
← Previous; Encandenados	Next → El Castillo del Terror

Guerra Revolucionaria chronology
← Previous; 2009	Next → 2011

The Guerra Revolucionaria (2010) (Spanish for "Revolutionary War") show was a major professional wrestling event produced and scripted by the Mexican professional wrestling promotion International Wrestling Revolution Group (IWRG), which took place on October 31, 2010 in Arena Naucalpan, Naucalpan, State of Mexico, Mexico. The main event of the show was a 20-man Battle Royal where the eliminated wrestlers would all remain at ringside, act as "Lumberjacks" to ensure none of the participants left the ring. Each lumberjack would be given a leather straps they were allowed to use on the still-active competitors. There was no official prize for winning the match other than the increased public profile of the winning wrestler.

The main event Guerra Revolucionaria tournament match was won by Pirata Morgan as he eliminated El Hijo de Cien Caras as the last of the nineteen wrestlers thrown out of the ring. The Guerra Revolucionaria show included three additional matches, a Best two-out-of-three falls six-person tag team match, a tag team match and a singles match

== Production ==
=== Background ===
Beginning in 2009 the Mexican wrestling promotion International Wrestling Revolution Group (IWRG; Sometimes referred to as Grupo Internacional Revolución in Spanish) held an annual show called Guerra Revolucionaria ("The Revolutionary War"), a reference to the Mexican revolutionary war (1810–1821). The main event match, the eponymous Guerra Revolucionaria, a 20-man "over the top" Battle Royal where all 20 wrestlers start out in the ring. Once a wrestler is thrown over the top rope to the floor that wrestler is eliminated from the actual match, from that point on they will act as a "Lumberjack" outside the ring, ensuring that none of remaining competitors try to escape the ring. Each "lumberjack" is given a leather strap that they are allowed to use on anyone that leaves the ring. There is no specific "award" for winning the Guerra Revolucionaria tournament. The multi-man match often allows IWRG to intersect various ongoing storylines as another step in the escalating tension. At other times, the match itself was used as a way to start new feuds due to interactions inside or outside the ring. The Guerra Revolucionaria shows, as well as the majority of the IWRG shows in general, are held in Arena Naucalpan, owned by the promoters of IWRG, and it is their main venue. The 2010 Guerra Revolucionaria show was the second year in a row that IWRG held an event under that label.

=== Storylines ===
The event featured four professional wrestling matches with different wrestlers, where some were involved in pre-existing scripted feuds or storylines, others simply put together by the matchmakers without a backstory. Being a professional wrestling event matches are not won legitimately through athletic competition; they are instead won via predetermined outcomes to the matches that is kept secret from the general public. Wrestlers portray either heels (the bad guys, referred to as Rudos in Mexico) or faces (fan favorites or Técnicos in Mexico).

== Event ==
The opening match saw two recent graduates from the IWRG wrestling school face off as El Centvrión defeated Keshin Black in a best two-out-of-three falls singles match. For the second match, a tag team match. the técnicos team of Brazo Metálico and Dinamic Black defeated the rudo team of Alan Extreme and Némesis. In the third match of the night Los Arlequíns (Arlequín Amarillo, Arlequín Negro and Arlequín Rojo) defeated the Exótico team of Bugambilla, Diva Salvaje and Miss Gaviota, breaking the rules behind the referee's back to gain the third and deciding fall. After the match the Exótico demanded a rematch. Prior to the main event IWRG held a tribute to Huracán Ramírez, Daniel García Arteaga. For the tribute they invited García daughter Karla and her husband Axel (grandson of El Santo) to the show. They came to the ring with their son Daniel, named after his grandfather.

In the Guerra Revolucionaria match wrestlers could be eliminated by pinfall, submission, count out or disqualification. Each eliminated wrestler was given a leather strap and remained at ringside. The order of elimination was: 1) Freelance, 2) Oficial AK-47, 3) Black Terry, 4) Magia Negra, 5) El Hijo de Anibal, 6) Oficial Fierro, 7) El Gran Markus Jr., 8) Cerebro Negro, 9) Tony Rivera, 10) Comando Negro, 11) El Pollo, 12) El Brazo, 13) El Hijo del Diablo, 14) Máscara Año 2000 Jr., 15) Chico Che. 16) Dr. Cerebro, 17) Oficial 911, 18) Veneno, 19) El Hijo del Cien Caras. During the final pinfall El Hijo de Cien Caras raised his shoulder off the mat before three, but the referee did not see it and counted the victory for Pirata Morgan. Moments later Máscara Año 2000 Jr. entered the ring, chasing Pirata Morgan from the arena.

== Aftermath ==
The main event was meant to set up further matches between Pirata Morgan and La Dinamitas Junior, but November 29, 2010 Eustacio Jiménez Ibarra, better known under the ring name El Hijo del Cien Caras was killed, shot while sitting in a car in Mexico City. After his death IWRG dropped the storyline with Pirata Morgan and held a Homenaje a Hijo de Cien Caras ("Homage to Hijo de Cien Cara") show on December 12, 2010.

Brazo Metálico, who worked the second match of the night was later revealed to not actually be part of the Brazo family. He would later adopt the ring name Golden Magic.

== Results ==
No.	Results	Stipulations
1	El Centvrión defeated Keshin Black	Best two-out-of-three falls singles match
2	Brazo Metálico and Dinamic Black defeated Alan Extreme and Némesis	Best two-out-of-three falls tag team match
3	Los Arlequíns (Arlequín Amarillo, Arlequín Negro and Arlequín Rojo) defeated Bugambilia del Norte, La Diva Salvaje and Miss Gaviota	Best two-out-of-three falls eight-person tag team match
4	Pirata Morgan won the Guerra Revolucionaria also in the match: Oficial 911, Oficial AK-47, Black Terry, El Brazo, Cerebro Negro, Chico Che, Comando Negro, Dr. Cerebro, Oficial Fierro, Freelance, Gran Markus Jr., El Hijo del Aníbal, El Hijo del Cien Caras, El Hijo del Diablo, Magia Negra, Máscara Año 2000 Jr., El Pollo, Tony Rivera and Veneno	20-Man Battle Royal, Lumberjack's with leather straps match
