= El Gran Desafío (2009) =

2009 International Wrestling Revolution Group event

- Promotion: International Wrestling Revolution Group
- Date: July 2, 2009
- City: Naucalpan, State of Mexico
- Venue: Arena Naucalpan

Event chronology
| ← Previous; Guerra Revolucionaria | Next → Prisión Fatal |

El Gran Desafío chronology
| ← Previous; First | Next → Feminil |

El Gran Desafío (2009) (Spanish for "The Great Challenge") was a major professional wrestling event produced and scripted by the Mexican Lucha libre promotion International Wrestling Revolution Group (IWRG) on July 2, 2009. The event was held in Arena Naucalpan, IWRG's home arena and the venue for the majority of their shows.

The main event was promoted as a clash between IWRG, represented by Dr. Cerebro and a promotion known as "Grand Prix Championship Wrestling" (GCPW) represented by owner/match maker Juventud Guerrera. The match was a best two-out-of-three-falls Lucha de Apuestas, or "bet match", where both wrestlers risked their hair on the outcome. As a result of his loss Dr. Cerebro was shaved bald after the match. The show included four additional matches.

== Production ==
=== Background ===
The Mexican lucha libre or professional wrestling promotion International Wrestling Revolution Group (IWRG; at times referred to as Grupo Internacional Revolución in Mexico) holds almost all of their major wrestling shows in Arena Naucalpan, in Naucalpan, State of Mexico, an arena owned and operated by the Moreno family who also owns and operates IWRG. The most prestigious match type in lucha libre is the Lucha de Apuestas (literally "Bet match") where each competitors "bets" either their wrestling mask or their hair on the outcome of the match. The Lucha de Apuestas format was created in 1940, with the first match of its type held on July 14, 1940 where the unmasked Octavio Gaona defeated the masked El Murciélago Enmascarado ("The Masked Bat"), forcing El Murciélago to unmask. Since then the Luchas de Apuestas match has become more important, more prestigious than championship matches with the Lucha de Apuestas matches normally headlining major lucha libre shows.

In 2004 Mexican wrestler Juventud Guerrera, backed by his father Fuerza Guerrera, formed a professional wrestling promotion called "Grand Prix Championship Wrestling Super-X" or GPCW Super-X for short. The indea was to tape lucha libre shows in Mexico and sell it to Japanese television for broadcast and if that was successful tour Japan with a group of Mexican wrestlers. GPCW Super-X held just one television taping and then ceased to promote more shows. In their brief lifetime they introduced the GPCW Super-X Monster Championship, a belt that would be promoted by AAA, who had allowed the Guerreras to use some of AAA's roster for his show. The title was around from 2004 until it was unified into the AAA Mega Championship in 2007 along with three other championships that AAA had promoted up until that point. In 2009 Juventud Guerrera announced that he was bringing GPCW Super-X back and was hoping to co-promote shows with various Mexican promotions, including IWRG.

=== Storylines ===
The event featured five professional wrestling matches with different wrestlers involved in pre-existing scripted feuds, plots and storylines. Wrestlers were portrayed as either heels (referred to as rudos in Mexico, those that portray the "bad guys") or faces (técnicos in Mexico, the "good guy" characters) as they followed a series of tension-building events, which culminated in a wrestling match or series of matches.

In the lead up to the show IWRG regular Fuerza Guerrera had brought his son Juventud Guerrera to several IWRG shows, creating a group consisting of himself, his son and Veneno known as Los Bravos ("the Brave"). Veneni was also an IWRG regular but who announced that he intended to also become a regular for Gran Prix Championship Wrestling.

== Event ==
In the opening match Máscara Magnifica defeated King Drako in a best two-out-of-three-falls match as he won both the first and the last fall of the match. The second match of the night was a best two-out-of-three-falls tag team match with the team of Exodia and Galactik facing Azoka and Carta Brava Jr. Expdia and Galactick won the third and decisive fall to win the match. For the third match of the night iWRG booked a traditional lucha libre best two-out-of-three-falls six-man tag team match with the técnico team of Chico Che, Jack and Rigo defeating Fantasma de la Ópera, Ghost Rider and Tetsuya Bushi.

The fourth match was billed as "Super-X GPCW Vs. IWRG" as GPCW representatives Ricky Cruzz and Los Bravos (Fuerza Guerrera and El Veneno) took on IWRG regulars Megatronik and Los Traumas (Trauma I and Trauma II). In the end Cruzz and Los Bravos won the third and deciding fall. In the main event Juventud Guerrera had his father, Fuerza Guerrera, as his corner-man while Dr. Cerebro brought Cerebro Negro to the ring with him. Juventud Guerrera pinned Dr. Cerebro in the third and deciding fall after Fuerza Guerrera held down Dr. Cerebro's leg. As a result of the Lucha de Apuestas loss Dr. Cerbro was shaved bald many wrestlers from the Super-X GPCW roster came to the ring, challenging IWRG wrestlers to show up for the GPCW show in August.

== Aftermath ==
With the run it after the main event, the intention was to promote a series of "promotional rivalry" shows between IWRG and GPCW Super-X to help establish GPCW in Mexico. In the end only one GPCW Super-X show was held in 2009, held on August 15 in Mexico City Mexico. The show featured a mixture of GPCW wrestlers such as the Guerreras and El Alebrije and a number of IWRG regulars such as Black Terry, Negro Navarro, Máscara Año 2000 Jr. and Angélico.

Los Bravos (Juventud Guerrera, Fuerza Guerrera and Veneno) would work further shows for IWRG but by the end of 2009 the Guerreras stopped appearing for IWRG on a regular basis.

== Results ==
| No. | Results | Stipulations | Times |
|---|---|---|---|
| 1 | Máscara Magnifica defeated King Drako | Best two-out-of-three-falls match | 09:23 |
| 2 | Exodia and Galactik defeated Azoka and Carta Brava Jr. | Best two-out-of-three-falls tag team match | 16:45 |
| 3 | Chico Che, Jack and Rigo defeated Fantasma de la Ópera, Ghost Rider and Tetsuya Bushi | Best two-out-of-three-falls six-man tag team match | 13:27 |
| 4 | Ricky Cruzz and Los Bravos (Fuerza Guerrera and El Veneno) defeated Megatronik and Los Traumas (Trauma I and Trauma II) | Best two-out-of-three-falls six-man tag team match | 20:17 |
| 5 | Juventud Guerrera defeated Dr. Cerebro | Best two-out-of-three-falls Lucha de Apuestas match, hair vs. hair match | 14:53 |
