= Guerra Revolucionaria (2011) =

2011 International Wrestling Revolution Group event

IWRG Guerra Revolucionaria
- Official poster showing all 20 men in the main event
- Promotion: International Wrestling Revolution Group
- Date: April 17, 2011
- City: Naucalpan, State of Mexico
- Venue: Arena Naucalpan
- Tagline(s): Guerra Revolicionaria Sin Escape Con Correras ("The Revolutionary War with no escape and no place to hide")

Event chronology
← Previous; Triangula del Terror	Next → Guerra de Empresas

Guerra Revolucionaria chronology
← Previous; 2010	Next → 2013

Guerra Revolucionaria (2011) (Spanish for "Revolutionary War") was a major professional wrestling event produced by Mexican professional wrestling promotion International Wrestling Revolution Group (IWRG), which took place on April 17, 2011, in Arena Naucalpan, Naucalpan, State of Mexico, Mexico. The main event of the show was a 20-man battle royal where the eliminated wrestlers would all remain at ringside and act as "lumberjacks" to ensure none of the participants left the ring. Each lumberjack would be given a leather straps which they were allowed to use on the still-active competitors. There was no official prize for winning the match other than the increased public profile of the winner.

== Production ==
=== Background ===
Beginning in 2009, the Mexican wrestling promotion International Wrestling Revolution Group (IWRG, sometimes referred to as Grupo Internacional Revolución in Spanish) held an annual show called Guerra Revolucionaria ("The Revolutionary War"), a reference to the Mexican Revolutionary War (1810-1821). The main event match, the eponymous Guerra Revolucionaria, was a 20-man battle royal in which all 20 wrestlers start out in the ring. Once a wrestler is thrown over the top rope to the floor that wrestler is eliminated from the actual match and instead will act as a "lumberjack" outside the ring, ensuring that none of remaining competitors try to escape the ring. Each "lumberjack" is given a leather strap that they are allowed to use on anyone who leaves the ring. The multi-man match often allows IWRG to intersect various ongoing storylines as another step in the escalating tension. At other times, the match itself was used as a way to start new feuds due to interactions inside or outside the ring. The Guerra Revolucionaria shows, as well as the majority of the IWRG shows in general, are held in "Arena Naucalpan", owned by the promoters of IWRG and their main arena. The 2011 Guerra Revolucionaria show was the third year in a row that IWRG held a show with that name.

=== Storylines ===
The event had five professional wrestling matches with different wrestlers, where some were involved in pre-existing scripted feuds or storylines and others were simply put together by the matchmakers without a backstory. As a professional wrestling event, matches are not won legitimately through athletic competition; they are instead won via predetermined outcomes that are kept secret from the general public. Wrestlers portray either heels (the bad guys, referred to as rudos in Mexico) or faces (fan favorites or técnicos in Mexico).

== Results ==
No.	Results	Stipulations
1	Guizmo defeated Muerte Infernal – two falls to zero	Best two-out-of-three falls singles match
2	Alan Extreme and Imposible defeated Rolling Boy and Tonatiu – two falls to one	Best two-out-of-three falls tag team match
3	El Hijo del Pantera, Freelance and Turbo defeated Black Thunder, Carta Brava Jr. and El Pollo Asesino – two falls to one	Best two-out-of-three falls six-person tag team match
4	Oficial Fierro, Hammer and Magnifico defeated Black Sky, Dinamic Black and Golden Magic – two falls to one	Best two-out-of-three falls six-person tag team match
5	Multifacético won La Guerra Revolucionaria; Also in the match: 911, AK-47, Avisman, Bestia 666, Black Terry, Bombero Infernal, Cerebro Negro, Dr. Cerebro, El Ángel, El Hijo de L.A. Park, El Hijo del Diablo, El Hijo de Dr. Wagner, El Pantera, Eterno, Fresero, Jr., El Hijo de Pirata Morgan, Máscara Año 2000, Jr., Tony Rivera and Trauma I	20-man battle royal, lumberjacks with leather straps match

=== Guerra revolucionaria order of elimination ===
#	Eliminated	By
1	El Ángel	
2	Avisman	
3	Dr. Cerebro	
4	El Hijo del Diablo	
5	Máscara Año 2000 Jr.	
6	Bombero Infernal	
7	Tony Rivera	
8	Cerebro Negro	
9	Fresero, Jr.	
10	Eterno	
11	El Pantera	
12	Oficial 911	
13	Black Terry	
14	Bestia 666	
15	Trauma I	
16	El Hijo de Dr. Wagner	
17	El Hijo de Pirata Morgan	
18	El Hijo de L.A. Park	Oficial AK-47
19	Oficial AK-47	Multifacético
20	Winner	Multifacético
