= IWRG La Isla =

2014 International Wrestling Revolution Group event

- Official poster for La Isla featuring all eight main event competitors
- Promotion: International Wrestling Revolution Group
- Date: August 31, 2014 (aired September 1, 2014)
- City: Naucalpan, State of Mexico
- Venue: Arena Naucalpan

Event chronology
← Previous; Prisión Fatal	Next → El Castillo del Terror

La Isla (Spanish for "The Island") was a major professional wrestling event produced and scripted by Mexican professional wrestling promotion International Wrestling Revolution Group (IWRG), which took place on August 31, 2014 in Arena Naucalpan, Naucalpan, State of Mexico, Mexico. The name La Isla is taken from a Mexican reality TV show also called La Isla, a show similar to Survivor.

The main event of the show was a special eight-man ladder match where the story-line prize was a bag full of 50,000 Mexican pesos ($3815). To claim the prize a wrestler would have to climb up the ladder and unhook the bag. The participants were Demon Clown, Dr. Wagner Jr., El Hijo de Dos Caras, Hijo de Máscara Año 2000, L.A. Par-K, Oficial AK-47, Trauma I and Veneno. The show featured four additional matches

== Production ==
=== Background ===
The Mexican lucha libre promotion International Wrestling Revolution Group (IWRG) has held a number of major shows since its creation in 1996. In the summer of 2014 IWRG announced that they would hold a special event called La Isla With a specially designed main event match, a ladder match where the storyline was that the winner of the match would be allowed to keep the 50,000 Mexican pesos ($3815) that were suspended over the ring in a bag.

=== Storylines ===
The event featured five professional wrestling matches with different wrestlers involved in pre-existing scripted feuds, plots and storylines. Wrestlers portrayed themselves as either heels (referred to as rudos in Mexico, those that portray the "bad guys") or faces (técnicos in Mexico, the "good guy" characters) as they follow a series of tension-building events, which culminated in wrestling matches.

The main event of the show was a direct fall-out from a match on July 20, 2014, for the vacant IWRG Intercontinental Heavyweight Championship. Hijo de Dos Caras, Pirata Morgan, L.A. Park, Demon Clown, Dr. Wagner Jr. and Máscara Sagrada faced off in a ladder match where the IWRG Intercontinental Heavyweight Championship belt was hung above the ring and whoever could climb up and get the belt would become the champion. During the match the actual ladder broke, forcing Máscara Sagrada to improvise by holding a different ladder stable so El Hijo de Dos Caras could climb the ladder to win the match and the championship as originally planned.

== Event ==
For the main event special La Isla match IWRG brought back all the competitors from the first four matches to serve as lumberjacks, distributed around the ring try to keep all the competitors inside the ring during the match. Prior to the match it was announced that if a wrestler was outside the ring for more than 20 seconds that person would be eliminated from the match and thus, would not be eligible for the 50,000 peso prize. While the match was contested under ladder match rules, IWRG stated that the ladder could not be used for the first ten minutes of the match. During the match several wrestlers paired off, focusing primarily on their rivals such as long time rivals Dr. Wagner Jr. and L.A. Park who has faced off all over Mexico for several years. IWRG Intercontinental Heavyweight Champion El Hijo de Dos Caras continued his long-running story-line with El Hijo de Máscara Año 2000, but also faced the challenges of Demon Clown, a 148 kg (326 lb) man wearing a demonic looking mask. During the match Trauma I was knocked out of the ring, after which Oficial AK-47 proceeded to throw a number of chairs at Trauma I, aided by several rudos who piled the chairs on top of the fallen Trauma II, leading to Trauma I's elimination from the match. Later on, before the 10-minute time limit was up, El Veneno was counted out of the match as he began fighting with several of the lumberjacks.

At the 10-minute mark, L.A. Park brought the first ladder into the match, dragging it to ringside before he was jumped by Dr. Wagner Jr. The two long-time rivals brawled on the floor, neglecting the time limit and thus were both eliminated from the match. After he was announced as eliminated L.A. Park took the ladder with him to the back, but IWRG officials returned it to ringside moments later. Demon Clown eliminated Oficial AK-47 from the match after executing a Piledrive, a move that would have gotten him disqualified during a regular match. Moments later Demon Clown leapt off the middle ring rope, landing on El Hijo de Máscara Año 2000 to eliminate him from the match as well. The match came down to Demon Clown and El Hijo de Dos Caras being left in the ring. At that point in time Demon Clown untied El Hijo de Dos Caras' mask and tied it and El Hijo de Dos Caras to the top rope. With El Hijo de Dos Caras trapped, Demon Clown took his time setting up the ladder in the middle of the ring. In the closing moments of the match Relampago, one of the lumberjacks, helped El Hijo de Dos Caras pull his head out of his mask, then quickly gave El Hijo de Dos Caras his own mask to cover his face and continue the match. The help turned out to be too little, too late as Demon Clown grabbed the bag with the 50.000 pesos to win the match.

After his victory, Demon Clown challenged El Hijo de Dos Caras to put the IWRG Intercontinental Heavyweight Championship on the line at a future show.

== Aftermath ==
Demon Clown was granted a match for the Heavyweight Championship a week later, on September 7, but lost the match to El Hijo de Dos Casas, two falls to none. El Hijo de Dos Caras' first reign as the IWRG Intercontinental Heavyweight Champion lasted until October 11, 2015, when he lost it to Máscara Año 2000 Jr. at the 2015 Caravana de Campeones show.

== Results ==
No.	Results	Stipulations
1^{D}	Anubis Black and Araña de Plata defeated Alfa and Látigo	Best two-out-of-three falls tag team match
2	Electro Boy, Freyser Jr. and Oficial Rayan defeated Dragón Celestial, Imposible and Metaleon	Best two-out-of-three falls six-man tag team match
3	Diva Salvaje, Dr. Cerebro and Miss Gaviota defeated Danny Casas, Hip Hop Man and Tony Rivera	Best two-out-of-three falls six-man tag team match
4	Kenshi Kabuki, Pantera and Relámpago defeated Trauma II and Los Gringos VIP (Apolo Estrada Jr. and El Hijo del Diablo)	Best two-out-of-three falls six-man tag team match
5	Demon Clown defeated Dr. Wagner Jr., Trauma I, El Hijo de Dos Caras, Veneno, L.A. Park, Oficial AK-47 and Hijo de Máscara Año 2000	MXN 50,000 Ladder match
D / – this was a dark match
