= Prisión Fatal (2012) =

2012 International Wrestling Revolution Group event

- Official poster showing El Hijo de Pirata Morgan, El Hijo de Máscara Año 2000, Oficial 911 and Factor
- Promotion: International Wrestling Revolution Group
- Date: December 2, 2012
- City: Naucalpan, State of Mexico
- Venue: Arena Naucalpan

Event chronology
← Previous; El Castillo del Terror	Next → Arena Naucalpan 35th Anniversary Show

Prisión Fatal chronology
← Previous; 2000	Next → March 2013

Anniversary of Lucha Libre in Estado de México Shows chronology
← Previous; 49th	Next → 51st

Prisión Fatal (2012) was a professional wrestling major event, produced by the Mexico based International Wrestling Revolution Group (IWRG) professional wrestling promotion. The event took place on November 1, 2012, at "Arena Naucalpan" in Naucalpan, State of Mexico, IWRG's main venue. The main event was the eponymous Prisión Fatal (Spanish for "Fatal Prison") Steel cage match where the last person remaining in the cage was forced to unmasked per the match stipulation. The Prisión Fatal match included El Hijo de Pirata Morgan, El Hijo de Máscara Año 2000, Oficial 911 and Factor. The show also celebrated the 50th Anniversary of Lucha Libre in Estado de México

== Production ==
=== Background ===
Starting as far back as at least 2000, the Mexican wrestling promotion International Wrestling Revolution Group (IWRG; Sometimes referred to as Grupo Internacional Revolución in Spanish) has held several annual events where the main event was a multi-man steel cage match where the last wrestler left in the cage would be forced to either remove their wrestling mask or have their hair shaved off under Lucha de Apuestas, or "bet match", rules. From 2012 IWRG has promoted a variation of the steel cage match under the moniker Prisión Fatal ("Deadly Prison") at least once a year since its inception. The Prisión Fatal has the added twist that each competitor is chained by the wrist to the cage with a long steel chain and to escape they fight have to get a key to unlock their chain before they are able to escape. The added chain helps to distinguish it from other Steel cage matches held throughout the year such as the IWRG Guerra del Golfo ("Gulf War"), IWRG Guerra de Sexos ("War of the Sexes") or IWRG El Castillo del Terror ("The Tower of Terror") shows. The Prisión Fatal shows, as well as the majority of the IWRG shows in general, are held in "Arena Naucalpan", owned by the promoters of IWRG and their main arena. The 2012 Prisión Fatal show was the first time that IWRG promoted a show under that name.

=== Storylines ===
The event featured five professional wrestling matches with different wrestlers involved in pre-existing scripted feuds, plots and storylines. Wrestlers were portrayed as either heels (referred to as rudos in Mexico, those that portray the "bad guys") or faces (técnicos in Mexico, the "good guy" characters) as they followed a series of tension-building events, which culminated in a wrestling match or series of matches.

The main event match came about as a result of a number of different feuds coinciding in one match, feuds between El Hijo de Pirata Morgan and El Hijo de Máscara Año 2000, Los Oficiales and Los Comandos Élite and finally between Hijo de Pirata Morgan and Factor who is a part of Los Comandos Élite.

Hijo de Pirata Morgan and Hijo de Máscara Año 2000

The storyline between Hijo de Pirata Morgan and Hijo de Máscara Año 2000 goes back to 2010 when Los Piratos (Hijo de Pirata) and his father Pirata Morgan began feuding with Los Junior Dinamitas, which Hijo de Máscara Año 2000 is a part of. Originally Los Piratos worked more with El Hijo de Cien Caras and Máscara Año 2000, Jr., but Hijo de Cien Caras was killed in November 2010 and Máscara Año 2000, Jr. began working more in AAA, which meant Hijo de Pirata began working more and more against Hijo de Máscara Año 2000 and Cien Caras, Jr. On December 19, 2010, Máscara Año 2000, Jr. won the IWRG Texas Heavyweight Championship from Hijo de Pirata. Over the next year or so the storyline was phased in and out as both competitors also pursued other championships and storylines. On September 16, 2012 the feud was reignited as Hijo de Pirata defeated Hijo de Máscara Año 2000 to win the IWRG Junior de Juniors Championship in a match where Hijo de Pirata's IWRG Rey del Ring Championship was also on the line. Later on both of them were involved in a multi-man Steel Cage Match where the last man in the ring would lose either their championship or their mask. Both Hijo de Pirata and Hijode Máscara Año 2000 escaped the cage, which ended with El Ángel winning the IWRG Intercontinental Middleweight Championship from Oficial AK-47. On October 21, 2012 Hijo de Pirata defeated Oficial Factor to regain the IWRG Junior de Juniors Championship.

Los Oficiales and Los Comandos Élite

In the summer of 2011 the group Los Oficiales introduced a new member called Oficial Spartan, replacing Oficial AK-47, who was unable to wrestle due to an arm injury, in his first match to team up with Oficial 911 and Oficial Fierro. In the fall of 2011 the original Oficiales kicked Spartan out of the group he cost their team a number of matches due to disqualifications. Spartan would return with back up in the form of Oficial Rayan, forming a group called Los Oficiales Elite to start a rival faction to Los Oficiales. In early 2012 Los Oficiales Elite became a trio with the introduction of Oficial Factor to the team. The Oficiales vs Oficiales Elite feud led to all six competitors putting their masks on the line in a Steel Cage match as the main event of the 2012 La Guerrera de Golfo show. During the show Oficial Factor and 911 both lost a steel cage match, which meant that the two were supposed to face off in the final match, but as a show of unity their respective partners all joined them in the steel cage, making it a six-way match instead. The match came down to Oficial Factor and Oficial AK-47 with Factor gaining the important victory, forcing AK-47 to have his hair shaved off as a result. The feud between the two factions continued throughout 2012 with several highlights, including Oficial AK-47 winning the vacant IWRG Intercontinental Middleweight Championship in a tournament, which saw him defeat Oficial Spartan in the quarter final. Oficial Factor won the 2012 Rey del Ring tournament, defeating 29 other wrestlers including members of Los Oficiales. On July 26, 2012 Los Oficiales ended Oficiales Elite's reign as Distrito Federal Trios Champions after 129 days. In the fall of 2012 Oficiales Elite changed their name to Los Comandos Élite, but the feud with Los Oficiales remained as intense as ever. The storyline was a major driving factor between both Oficial 911 and Factor being part of the main event Prisión Fatal match as well as a tag team match on the undercard as well. In that match the remaining members of Los Oficiales would take on the remaining members of Los Comandos Élite in the third match of the night

Hijo de Pirata Morgan and Factor

The storyline between Hijo de Pirata and Factor did not really start until the fall of 2012, when Factor lost the Rey del Ring championship to Hijo de Pirata. He later regained the Rey del Ring title as well as won the IWRG Junior de Juniors Championship from Hijo de Pirata. The two also had several heated exchanges in the 2012 El Castillo del Terror Steel cage match, but neither gained a definitive advantage over the other in that match. The three storylines were tied together through a match in mid-November where Factor successfully defended the Rey del Ring title against Hijo de Máscara Año 2000. Factor was forced by the wrestling commission to have Oficial 911 in his corner while Hijo de Máscara had Cien Caras, Jr. in his corner. Following the title match all the involved participants as well as Hijo de Pirata fought, leading to the various participants challenging the others to put their mask on the line in a Luchas de Apuestas or bet match.

In the lead up to the 2012 Castillo del Terror cage match teammates in the semi-main event El Ángel and Los Traumas (Trauma I and Trauma II) had a falling out as El Ángel turned on Trauma II during a tag team match, attacking him to help improve his odds in the steel cage match that all three were scheduled to compete in. The rudo turn was promptly ignored on subsequent shows, written off as "competitive spirit" more than anything. El Ángel won the Castillo del Terror match, unmasking Oficial Fierro, while Los Traumas both escaped the cage without too much interaction with El Ángel. The three were booked to face off against the father/son team of Damián 666 and Bestia 666 who teamed up with Canis Lupus for the show. There was no overall storyline drive behind the final two matches, nor any particular reason for either of the teams to be paired up for the show.

== Event ==
The first match of the show featured the lucha libre unique Mini-Estrellas division, a division that is not the same as midget wrestling, in the fact that it is not restricted to people with dwarfism but also wrestlers who are generally short in stature. IWRG does not have a regular Mini-Estrella division, which meant that this special attraction match featured workers from AAA and the Mexican Independent circuit, some who may work in the regular division elsewhere. The match was originally announced as Mini Espiritu teaming with Mini Psicosis and Piratita Morgan, Jr., but he was replaced by Mini Ozz on the night with no explanation given for the substitution. Mini Psicosis was the reigning AAA World Mini-Estrella Champion, Mini Ozz is a smaller version of Dark Ozz from AAA and Piratita Morgan, Jr. is the latest wrestler to use the name and ring character of a smaller version of Pirata Morgan, or perhaps in this case Morgan's sons Hijo de Pirata Morgan/Pirata Morgan, Jr. The trio took on and defeated the tecnico trio of Mini Batista, Mini Rey Cometa, Mini Super Astro. Mini Batista works as a comedy mini version of former World Wrestling Entertainment wrestler Batista, Mini Rey Cometa as a smaller version of Consejo Mundial de Lucha Libre (CMLL) worker Rey Cometa and Mini Super Astro as mini of Super Astro, who himself is close to the Mini-Estrella height limit. The second match of the evening featured six IWRG regulars as the team of Alan Extreme, Carta Brava, Jr. and Eita defeated Avisman, Cerebro Negro and Dinamic Black. The third match of the night and the first match with a background to it saw the clash of Los Oficiales, represented by Oficial AK-47 and Oficial Fierro and the splinter faction Los Comandos Élite, represented by Rayan and Spartan. On the night Comandos Élite defeated Los Oficiales, adding another chapter to the feud between the two factions. In the fourth match Los Traumas showed that they had not forgotten El Ángel's actions the last time they teamed up together and the trio did not get along at all. While neither side actually turned on each other or came to blows there was a lot of problems for the team. The problems lead to Bestia 666, Canis Lupus and Damián 666 taking advantage of it to win the match. Following the match Los Traumas challenged their tag team partner to put his mask on the line.

The main event Prisión Fatal concept was unveiled as an over 15 foot tall steel cage surrounding the wrestling ring. Once all four competitors, Hijo de Pirata Morgan, Hijo de Máscara Año 2000, Oficial 911 and Factor, had been introduced each of them were attached to a long chain where the other end was attached to the cage. The object of the match was to reach the key to the lock, unlock yourself and climb out of the cage to keep your mask safe. The last man left in the ring would be forced to unmask and reveal his real name as per the Luchas de Apuestas traditions. The match started out with all four wrestlers trying to achieve two goals at ones, get the key to unlock themselves and prevent others from getting their key. The match saw liberal use of the cage as a weapon, with wrestlers throwing each other against the sides of the cage, as well as using the attached steel chain against each other. Hijo del Pirata Morgan was the first to get a key, quickly releasing himself from the chain, then climbing the cage walls, up and over the top to safety while the remaining three wrestlers were fighting. Hijo de Máscara took advantage of Factor and Oficial 911 focusing on each other to grab his key, freeing himself before climbing out of the cage. Once the match was down to the longtime rivals Factor and 911 their respective partners stormed into the arena, climbed into the cage and attacked each other. The three on three steel cage fight was reminiscent of 2012 La Guerrera de Golfo event where Factor and 911 were the official competitors, but were joined by their teammates. Unlike the Golfo event the match came down to the scheduled participants, with Oficial 911 escaping the cage, leaving a defeated Factor behind in the ring. Following the match Factor removed his wrestling mask and revealed that his name was Cesar Caballero and confirming that he was indeed the same wrestler that had played the "Mega" character from 1998 until 2004.

== Results ==
No.	Results	Stipulations
1	Mini Ozz, Mini Psicosis and Piratita Morgan, Jr. defeated Mini Batista, Mini Rey Cometa, Mini Super Astro	Six-Man Tag Team match
2	Alan Extreme, Carta Brava, Jr. and Eita defeated Avisman, Cerebro Negro and Dinamic Black	Six-Man Tag Team match
3	Los Comandos Élite (Rayan and Spartan) defeated Los Oficiales (Oficial AK-47 and Oficial Fierro)	Tag Team match
4	Bestia 666, Canis Lupus and Damián 666 defeated El Ángel and Los Traumas (Trauma I and Trauma II)	Six-Man Tag Team match
5	Factor lost to El Hijo de Pirata Morgan, El Hijo de Máscara Año 2000, Oficial 911	Prisión Fatal Steel cage match
