= IWRG Guerra Revolucionaria =

International Wrestling Revolution Group event series

The IWRG Guerra Revolucionaria (Spanish for the "Revolutionary War") is a major lucha libre show produced and scripted by the Mexican International Wrestling Revolution Group (IWRG; sometimes referred to as Grupo Internacional Revolución in Mexico) on a near-annual basis. The first Guerra Revolucionaria show was held in 2009. Since then IWRG has held a show in 2010, 2011, 2013 and 2015. All Guerra Revolucionaria shows have taken place in Arena Naucalpan located in Naucalpan, State of Mexico, Mexico, which is IWRG's home promotion

The Guerra Revolucionaria show is always main evented by a 20-man Battle Royal where the eliminated wrestlers would all remain at ringside and act as "Lumberjacks" to ensure none of the participants left the ring. Each lumberjack would be given a leather straps they were allowed to use on the still-active competitors. Except for the 2013 show IWRG did not offer a specific prize to the winner of the Guerra Revolucionaria, in 2013, the winner of the match was granted a match for the IWRG Rey del Ring Championship. Past winners include Trauma I, Pirata Morgan, Multifacético and Hijo del Máscara Año 2000. Hijo del Máscara Año 2000 is the only wrestler to win the event twice, in 2013 and 2015.

== Event history ==
Beginning in 2009 the Mexican wrestling promotion International Wrestling Revolution Group (IWRG; Sometimes referred to as Grupo Internacional Revolución in Spanish) held their first ever Guerra Revolucionaria ("The Revolutionary War"), a reference to the Mexican revolutionary war (1810–1821). The main event of the first and all subsequent Guerra Revolucionara shows is the eponymous Guerra Revolucionaria tournament. The tournament is a 20-man match contested under lucha libre elimination rules where a wrestler can be eliminated from the match via losing a pinfall, being forced to submit, counted out of the ring for being away from the ring too long or disqualified for breaking a rule. Unlike other elimination matches the eliminated wrestlers would not leave the ring, but remain on the floor to act as "Lumberjacks", tasked with keeping the remaining wrestlers in the ring for the Guerra Revolucionaria match itself. Each "lumberjack" is given a leather strap by an IWRG official that they are free to use on any wrestler that leaves the ring, regardless of if said wrestler was thrown out of the ring by an opponent of if they left the ring voluntarily. As the match goes on more and more lumberjacks are on the floor until only one wrestler remains, deemed the winner of the Guerra Revolucionaria. The first Guerra Revolucinaria show was held on March 29, 2009. IWRG held the second Guerra Revolucionaria show on October 31, 2010 turning it into a regular, semi-annual event. The third Guerra Revolucionaria show took place on November 20, 2011. IWRG did not hold a Guerra Revolucionaria show in 2012, but brought it back on November 10, 2013 for the fourth Guerra Revolucionaria show. There was no Guerra Revolucionaria show in 2014, but IWRG did hold their fifth Guerra Revolucionaria in 2015. All Guerra Revolucionaria shows have been held at IWRG's home arena, Arena Naucalpan in Naucalpan, State of Mexico, Mexico.

Unlike other IWRG tournaments such as the IWRG Rey del Ring ("King of the Ring") tournament where the winner also wins the IWRG Rey del Ring Championship, or the IWRG La Gran Cruzada ("The Great Crusade) tournament where the winner becomes the number one contender for the IWRG Rey del Ring tournament, there is not normally a tangible "award" for the winner of the Guerra Revolucionaria match. The only exception was the 2013 Guerra Revolucionaria tournament where the winner became the number one contender for the IWRG Rey del Ring Championship.

A total of 112 wrestlers has participated in at least one of the Guerra Revolucionaria shows, of those two were Exóticos, none were female wrestlers and IWRG did not use anyone from the Mini-Estrellas division. Four wrestlers have worked a total of four Guerra Revolucionarias, Dr. Cerebro, Golden Magic, El Hijo del Diablo and Oficial 911, more than any other wrestlers. Alan Extreme, Bombero Infernal, Danny Casas, Cerebro Negro, Chico Che, Eterno, Freelance, El Hijo de Pirata Morgan, Imposible, Máscara Año 2000 Jr., Oficial AK-47, Oficial Fierro, Tony Rivera, Trauma I and Veneno have all worked three of the five Guerra Revoluctionaria shows. Golden Magic worked one show under the ring name Brazo Metálico before adopting the "Golden Magic" ring character. Guillermo Martinez Cid has worked as both Bombero Infernal ("The Infernal Firefighter") and Capitán Muerte ("Captain Death"). Danny Casas started out working under the name "Hammer" before later revealing he was part of the Casas wrestling family, appearing under both names at the Guerra Revolucionaria shows. The wrestler originally known as Comando Negro later took over the Canis Lupus character, although IWRG does not officially acknowledge it. Two different wrestlers have worked as "Multifacético" on a Guerra Revolucionaria show, in 2009 the wrestler now known as Guerrero Maya Jr. was under the mask, while a different wrestler portrayed Multifacético on the 2011 show.

Past winners include Trauma I (2009), Pirata Morgan (2010), Multifacético (2011), and Hijo del Máscara Año 2000 (2013 and 2015). El Hijo del Máscara Año 2000 is the only wrestler to win the event twice, in 2013 he earned a match for the IWRG Rey del Ring Championship but failed to win it. In 2015 he won as part of a long running storyline with El Hijo de Dos Caras who he eliminated to win the match.

== Guerra Revolucionaria tournament winners ==
Year	Winner	Ref(s)
2009	Trauma I	
2010	Pirata Morgan	
2011	Multifacético	
2013	Hijo del Máscara Año 2000	
2015	Hijo del Máscara Año 2000 (2)	

== Dates, venues, and main events ==
Event	Date	City	Venue	Main event	Ref(s)
2009	March 29, 2009	Naucalpan, Mexico State	Arena Naucalpan	20-man Guerra Revolucionaria	
2010	October 31, 2010	Naucalpan, Mexico State	Arena Naucalpan	20-man Guerra Revolucionaria	
2011	April 17, 2011	Naucalpan, Mexico State	Arena Naucalpan	20-man Guerra Revolucionaria	
2013	November 10, 2013	Naucalpan, Mexico State	Arena Naucalpan	20-man Guerra Revolucionaria	
2015	May 18, 2015	Naucalpan, Mexico State	Arena Naucalpan	20-man Guerra Revolucionaria	
