= CMLL World Women's Championship =

Professional wrestling women's championship

- The CMLL World Women's Championship belt.

Details
- Promotion: Consejo Mundial de Lucha Libre
- Date established: June 12, 1992^{[G]}
- Current champion: Persephone
- Date won: March 6, 2026
Statistics
- First champion: Bull Nakano^{[G]}
- Most reigns: Marcela (5 times)
- Longest reign: La Amapola (3 years, 346 days)
- Shortest reign: Marcela (2nd reign, 29 days)
- Oldest champion: Marcela (47 years, 172 days)
- Youngest champion: Xóchitl Hamada (22 years, 324 days)
- Heaviest champion: Bull Nakano (91 kg (201 lb))
- Lightest champion: Hiroka (45 kg (99 lb))

The CMLL World Women's Championship (Campeonato Mundial Femenil de CMLL in Spanish) is the championship in women's professional wrestling that is most highly promoted by the Mexican lucha libre promotion Consejo Mundial de Lucha Libre (CMLL). The championship has existed since 1992 and is one of two women's championships currently promoted by CMLL; the other is the Mexican National Women's Championship. As it is a professional wrestling championship, it is not won legitimately; it is instead won via a scripted ending to a match or awarded to a wrestler because of a storyline. Up until late 2021, all championship matches promoted in Mexico took place under best two-out-of-three falls rules.

Bull Nakano became the first CMLL World Women's Champion after winning a 12-woman battle royal to receive the title on June 12, 1992. La Amapola holds the record for the longest reign with 1,442 days. Marcela has had the most reigns, with five. Marcela has had the shortest title reign, at 29 days. The CMLL World Women's Championship is the only Women's Championship and one of the only of two championships, the other being the IWGP Heavyweight Championship to be defended in the country of North Korea at the event Collision in Korea in a match between at the time CMLL World Women's Champion Akira Hokuto defeated Bull Nakano.

== Title history ==
On June 12, 1992, Bull Nakano became the first champion in the title's history by defeating Lola González in a 12-woman 12-woman torneo cibernetico elimination match.^{[G]} On November 4, 1996, CMLL stripped the fourth champion Reina Jubuki out of the title for wrestling on WCW Monday Nitro.^{[G]} On November 8, 1996, Lady Apache won the vacant championship by defeating Chaparita Asari in the finals of a four-woman tournament final.^{[G]} In February 1999, the championship was vacated due to inactivity of the CMLL's women's division.^{[G]} Apache won the vacant championship for the second time on May 15, 1999, however, the title was vacated once again with Apache leaving CMLL.

On 2001, La Diabólica, who previously was the number one contender for the title at the time, was awarded the vacant championship. In April 2003, the title was vacated again as Diabólica left the promotion. On September 16, 2005, at the CMLL 72nd Anniversary Show, Marcela defeated Dark Angel to win the vacant championship in the final of 12-woman tournament. On August 16, 2023, The championship was vacated once again after the previous titleholder Princesa Sugehit sustained an injury. On September 29, at CMLL Noche de Campeones, Stephanie Vaquer won the vacant championship by defeating La Catalina.

== Reigns ==
Current champion Persephone, shown here with the current title belt.

As of November 18, 2026, there have been 25 reigns between 18 champions and six vacancies. Bull Nakano was the inaugural champion. Marcela holds the record for most reigns at five. La Amapola's first and only reign is the longest at 1,442 days, while Marcela's second reign is the shortest at 29 days. Marcela is the oldest champion at 47 years old, while Xóchitl Hamada is the youngest at 22 years old.

Persephone is the current champion in her first reign. She won the title at La Noche de las Amazonas on March 6, 2026 in Mexico City, Mexico, when she defeated Mercedes Moné.

Key
No.	Overall reign number
Reign	Reign number for the specific champion
Days	Number of days held
N/A	Unknown information
+	Current reign is changing daily

No.	Champion	Championship change			Reign statistics		Notes	Ref.
No.	Champion	Date	Event	Location	Reign	Days	Notes	Ref.
Consejo Mundial de Lucha Libre (CMLL)
1	Bull Nakano	June 12, 1992	Super Viernes	Mexico City, D.F.	1	282	Nakano defeated Lola González to become the inaugural champion in the final of a 12-woman 12-woman torneo cibernetico elimination match.	^{[G]}
2	Xóchitl Hamada	March 21, 1993	Live event	Mexico City, D.F.	1	203		^{[G]}
3	La Diabólica	October 10, 1993	Live event	Mexico City, D.F.	1	293		^{[G]}
4	Reina Jubuki	July 30, 1994	Live event	Puebla, Puebla	1	828		^{[G]}
—	Vacated	November 4, 1996	—	—	—	—	CMLL stripped Reina Jubuki of the title for wrestling on WCW Monday Nitro.	^{[G]}
5	Lady Apache	November 8, 1996	Super Viernes	Mexico City, D.F.	1	90	Lady Apache defeated Chaparita Asari in the finals of a four-woman tournament final to win the championship.	^{[G]}
6	Mariko Yoshida	February 6, 1997	Live event	Tokyo, Japan	1	(Note: The exact date on which the title was vacated is unknown, which means that the title reign lasted between 725 and 752 days.)		^{[G]}
—	Vacated	February 1999	—	—	—	—	The championship was vacated due to inactivity in CMLL's women's division.	^{[G]}
7	Lady Apache	May 15, 1999	Live event	Naucalpan, Mexico	2	461		^{[G]}
—	Vacated	August 18, 2000	—	—	—	—	The championship was vacated when Lady Apache left the promotion.	
8	La Diabólica	2001	N/A	N/A	2	456	La Diabólica was awarded the championship by CMLL as she was the number one contender at that time.	
—	Vacated	April 2003	—	—	—	—	The championship was vacated when La Diabólica left the promotion.	
9	Marcela	September 16, 2005	CMLL 72nd Anniversary Show	Mexico City, D.F.	1	266	Marcela defeated Dark Angel to win the vacant championship in the final of a 12-woman tournament.	
10	Hiroka	June 9, 2006	Super Viernes	Mexico City, D.F.	1	199		
11	Lady Apache	December 25, 2006	Live event	Mexico City, D.F.	3	326		
12	La Amapola	November 16, 2007	Super Viernes	Mexico City, D.F.	1	1,442		
13	Marcela	October 28, 2011	Super Viernes	Mexico City, D.F.	2	29		
14	Ayumi	November 26, 2011	Live event	Tokyo, Japan	1	104		
15	Marcela	March 9, 2012	Super Viernes	Mexico City, D.F.	3	1,008		
16	Syuri	December 12, 2014	Reina Joshi Puroresu Shin-Kiba Tournament	Tokyo, Japan	1	119		
17	Marcela	April 10, 2015	Super Viernes	Mexico City, D.F.	4	336		
18	Dalys la Caribeña	March 11, 2016	Super Viernes	Mexico City, D.F.	1	983		
19	Marcela	November 19, 2018	Lunes Clásico	Mexico City, D.F.	5	704		
20	Princesa Sugehit	October 23, 2020	Super Viernes	Mexico City, D.F.	1	1,027		
—	Vacated	August 16, 2023	—	—	—	—	The championship was vacated when Princesa Sugehit sustained an injury.	
21	Stephanie Vaquer	September 29, 2023	CMLL Noche de Campeones	Mexico City, D.F.	1	285	Defeated La Catalina to win the vacant championship, where the featured matches at the event were voted by fans online.	
—	Vacated	July 10, 2024	—	—	—	—	Stephanie Vaquer was stripped of the title when she left the promotion, joining WWE. NJPW and CMLL announced a three-way match to determine the next champion at the ensuing weekend's Fantastica Mania event at Mt. Pleasant High School in San Jose, California.	
22	Willow Nightingale	July 13, 2024	CMLL x NJPW: FantasticaMania USA	San Jose, California, U.S.	1	62	Defeated Viva Van and Lluvia in a three-way match to win the vacant title.	
23	Zeuxis	September 13, 2024	CMLL 91st Anniversary Show	Mexico City, D.F.	1	278		
24	Mercedes Moné	June 18, 2025	Grand Slam Mexico	Mexico City, D.F.	1	261	This was an All Elite Wrestling show, co-produced with CMLL.	
25	Persephone	March 6, 2026	La Noche de las Amazonas	Mexico City, D.F.	1	257+		

== Combined reigns ==
As of November 18, 2026

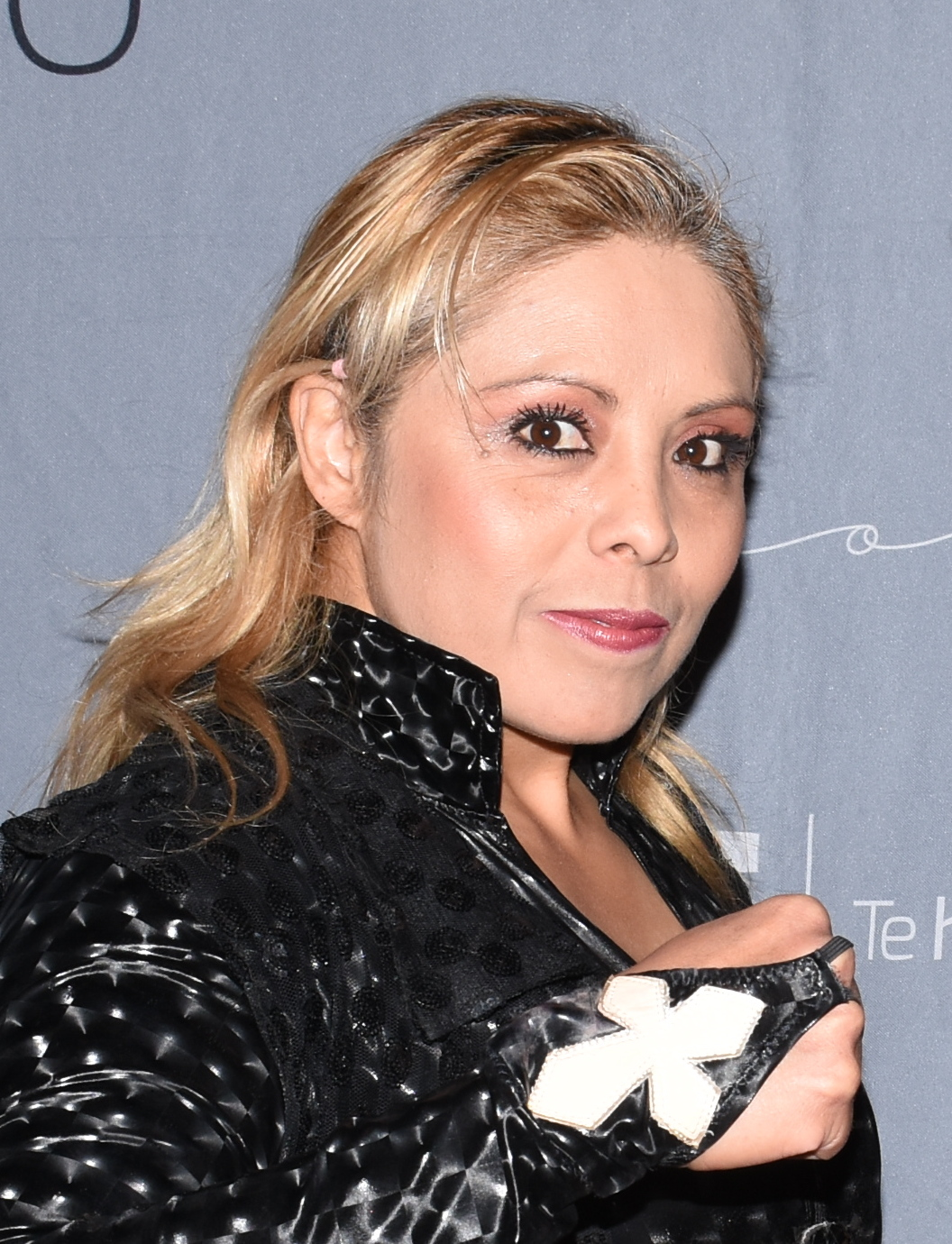
Longest reigning champion La Amapola at 1,442 days

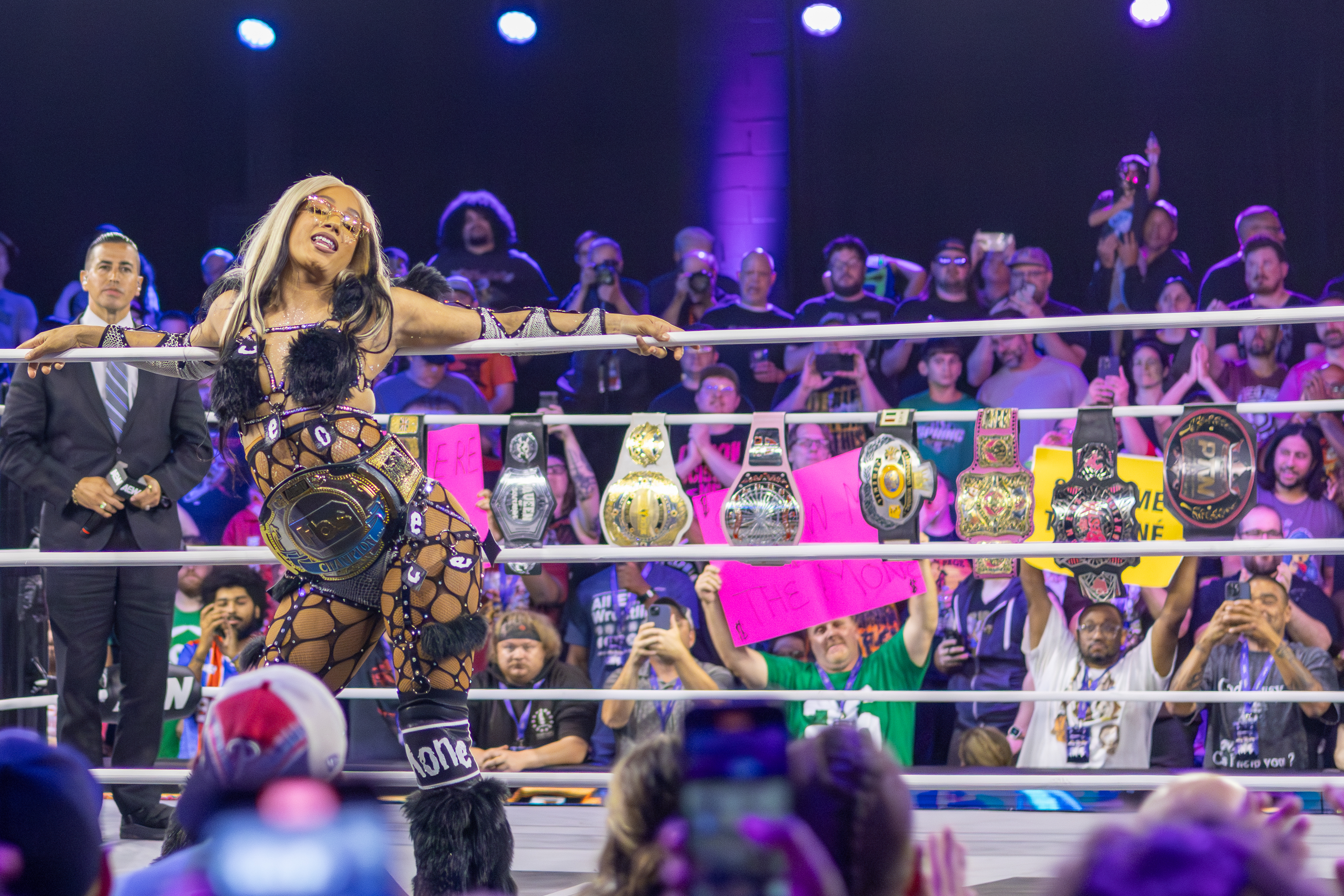
Former champion Mercedes Moné, displaying the current design of the belt (fourth to the right).

†	Indicates the current champion.
¤	The exact length of at least one title reign is uncertain; the shortest possible length is used.

Rank	Wrestler	No. of reigns	Combined Days
1	Marcela	5	2,343
2	La Amapola	1	1,442
3	Princesa Sugehit	1	1,027
4	Dalys la Caribeña	1	983
5	Lady Apache	3	877
6	Reina Jubuki	1	828
7	La Diabólica	2	749¤
8	Mariko Yoshida	1	725¤
9	Stephanie Vaquer	1	285
10	Bull Nakano	1	282
11	Zeuxis	1	278
12	Mercedes Moné	1	261
13	Persephone †	1	257+
14	Xóchitl Hamada	1	203
15	Hiroka	1	199
16	Syuri	1	119
17	Ayumi	1	104
18	Willow Nightingale	1	62

== Championship tournaments ==
=== 1992 Championship tournament ===
CMLL held a 15-woman torneo cibernetico elimination match on June 5, 1992, to determine the two women who would fight for the newly created CMLL World Women's champion the following week. La Diabólica was originally scheduled to work the match, but did not appear which led to the uneven sides in the elimination match. Several of the participants had recently joined CMLL, leaving the Universal Wrestling Association to join CMLL and its recently restarted women's division. Zuleyma was the reigning UWA World Women's Championship going into the match and CMLL allowed her to keep and defend the UWA championship in the years following Zuleyma's jump to CMLL. The finals came down to Lola Gonzales, a pioneer for women's wrestling in Mexico, and Bull Nakano, a Japanese wrestler that worked regularly for CMLL. The following week, on June 12, 1993, Bull Nakano became the first CMLL World Women's Champion by virtue of her victory over Lola Gonzales.

#	Eliminated	Eliminated by
1	Guerrera Purpura	Unknown
2	Selene	Unknown
3	Atenas	Unknown
4	Neftali	Unknown
5	Wendy	Unknown
6	Pantera Sureña	Unknown
7	Zuleyma	Unknown
8	Maria del Angel	Unknown
9	La Sirenita	Unknown
10	Kaoru	Unknown
11	Lady Apache	Unknown
12	Xóchitl Hamada	Unknown
13	Martha Villalobos	Lola Gonzales
14	Lola Gonzales	Winner
14	Bull Nakano	Winner

=== 1996 Championship tournament ===
On November 6, 1996, CMLL took the CMLL World Women's Championship away from then reigning champion Reina Jubuki because she had wrestled on a World Championship Wrestling (WCW) show in North America only a few days prior. At the time WCW had a working relationship with Asistencia Asesoría y Administración (AAA), CMLL's main rival in Mexico and thus appearing for WCW was enough for CMLL to sever ties with Jubuki. CMLL held a tournament to crown a new champion only 2 days after announcing the title being vacated, choosing four of their top female competitors for a quick four-woman tournament.

semifinals
1	Xochitl Hamada
4	Lady Apache	W
3	La Diabólica
2	Chaparita Asari	W

Final
Lady Apache	W
Chaparita Asari

=== 2005 Championship tournament ===
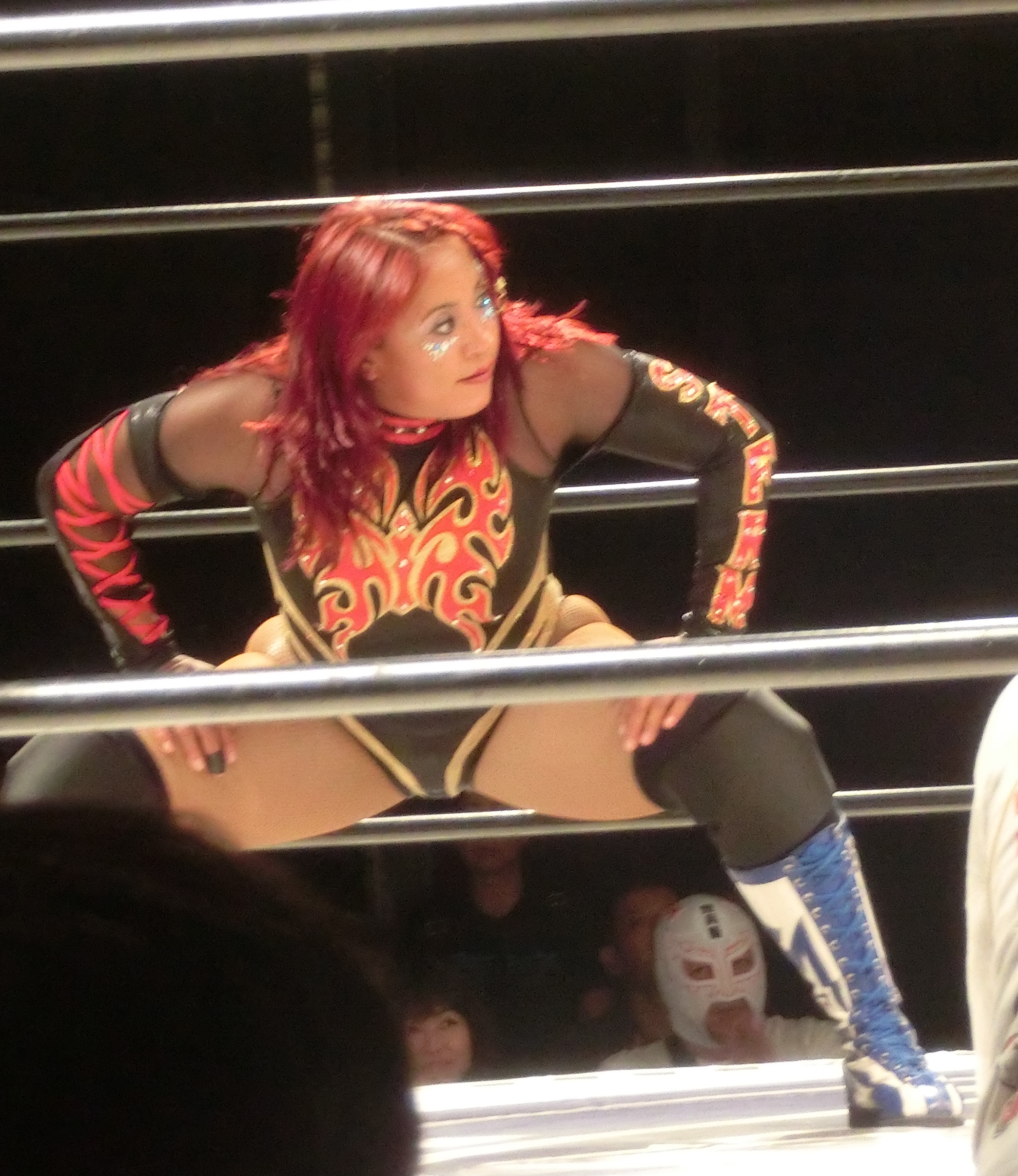
Tournament winner and record five-time champion Marcela

The reigning champion, La Diabólica left CMLL to join rival Asistencia Asesoría y Administración (AAA) on April 5, 2003, which forced CMLL to vacate the championship. This happened during a time of very low activity in CMLL's female division, which meant the title was inactive for over two years before CMLL held a tournament for the title starting on September 9, 2005. CMLL held a nine-woman torneo cibernetico elimination match to determine the two finalists that would face off the next week in a best two-out-of-three falls match. Dark Angel and Marcela survived the match and met on September 16, 2005, with Marcela winning the match and her first CMLL World Women's Championship.

#	Eliminated	Eliminated by
X	Hiroka	Unknown
X	India Sioux	Unknown
X	La Medusa	Unknown
X	La Nazi	Unknown
X	Linda Star	Unknown
X	Princesa Sujei	Unknown
X	Sahori	Unknown
8	Dark Angel	Winner
8	Marcela	Winner
