= Lady Apache =

Mexican professional wrestler (born 1970)

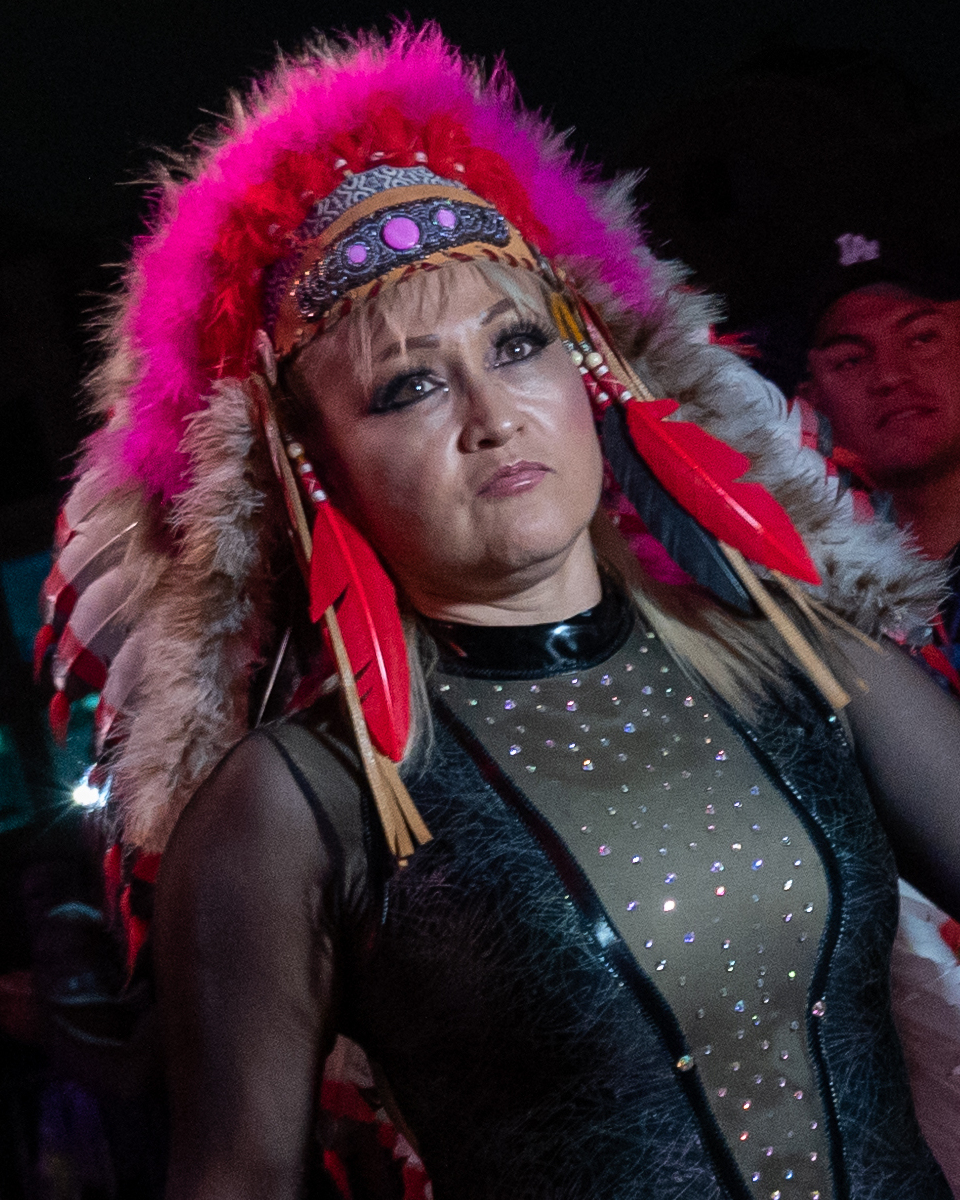
- Lady Apache in 2023

Personal information
- Born: Sandra González Calderón; June 26, 1970 (age 56) Mexico City, Mexico
- Spouses: Electroshock (husband); Gran Apache (ex-husband); Brazo de Oro (ex-husband)
- Relatives: Faby Apache (step-daughter); Mari Apache (step-daughter); Charly Manson (Brother-in-law)

Professional wrestling career
- Ring name: Lady Apache
- Billed height: 1.60 m (5 ft 3 in)
- Billed weight: 63 kg (139 lb)
- Trained by: Gran Apache; Pepe Casas; Raúl Reyes; El Satánico; Último Guerrero
- Debut: June 26, 1986

Sandra González Calderón (born June 26, 1970), better known under the ring name Lady Apache, is a Mexican professional wrestler. She is best known for her tenures in Consejo Mundial de Lucha Libre (CMLL) and AAA.

González's ring name came as a result of her marriage to Mario Balbuena González, who wrestled under the name Gran Apache. Through her marriage, she was the stepmother of Faby Apache and Mari Apache, both professional wrestlers. González's second husband was Jesus Alvarado Nieves, better known as Brazo de Oro. Her third husband, Edgar Luna Pozos, is generally known under the ring name Electroshock. She is also the sister-in-law to Charly Manson (Jesus Luna Pozos).

González is a three-time CMLL World Women's Champion, two-time Mexican National Women's Champion, two-time AAA Reina de Reinas (Spanish for "Queen of Queens"), one-time AAA World Mixed Tag Team Champion with husband Electroshock, and the 2016 women's Lucha Libre World Cup winner alongside Faby and Mari Apache.

== Personal life ==
Sandra González Calderón was born on June 26, 1970, in Mexico City, Mexico. In the mid-1980s, González was married to Mario Balbuena González, a professional wrestler known under the name Gran Apache. The two met when Balbuena began training González for a professional wrestling career and married before she made her in-ring debut. The couple later divorced, with González later marrying Jesus Alvarado Nieves, who wrestled under the name Brazo de Oro. In the early 2000s, it was revealed that González and Alvarado were divorced, and she was then married to Edgar Luna Pozos, known in professional wrestling under the names of Electroshock and later Mr. Electro.

== Professional wrestling career ==
=== Early career (1986–1990) ===
González made her professional wrestling debut on June 26, 1986, adopting the ring name "Lady Apache". Early in her career, Lady Apache defeated La Gata twice in a Lucha de Apuestas ("bet match"; the most prestigious match type in Mexican wrestling), first forcing La Gata to remove her mask and later to have all her hair shaved off.

=== Consejo Mundial de Lucha Libre (1990–1999) ===
In 1990, Lady Apache began working for Empresa Mexicana de Lucha Libre (EMLL), Mexico's largest and oldest wrestling promotion. Her first major match saw her and Xóchitl Hamada unsuccessfully challenge Martha Villalobos and Pantera Sureña for the Mexican National Women's Tag Team Championship on May 29, 1992. On August 16, Lady Apache defeated La Diabólica to win the Distrito Federal Women's Championship, a local championship within Mexico City. After 1,365 days, with very few championship defenses in that period of time, she lost it to La Practicante. When EMLL rebranded to Consejo Mundial de Lucha Libre (CMLL) in late 1991 and introduced the CMLL World Women's Championship, Lady Apache was one of fourteen wrestlers competing in the initial tournament for the championship; she was not involved in the finals, where Bull Nakano defeated Lola González to win the championship.

In mid-1993, the Mexican National Women's Championship was vacated as then-champion La Sieranita became pregnant and could no longer compete. The tournament to determine a new champion saw Lady Apache and La Diabólica qualify for the final by winning a torneo cibernetico elimination match on August 14. The following week La Diabólica defeated Lady Apache to claim the championship. The following year, Lady Apache unsuccessfully challenged long-time rival La Diabólica for the CMLL World Women's Championship but lost the match. She would later unsuccessfully challenge Reina Jubuki for the same championship. On June 1, 1996, Lady Apache represented CMLL at the World Wrestling Peace Festival teaming with Akira Hokuto to defeat Bull Nakano and Neftali.

In November 1996, Lady Apache defeated Xochitl Hamada and then Chaparita Asari in a tournament to win the vacant CMLL World Women's Championship, becoming the fifth overall holder of the championship. Her first reign lasted 90 days, until Mariko Yoshida defeated her on February 6, 1997, on a show in Tokyo, Japan. The CMLL women's division was virtually inactive starting in 1997, with Lady Apache only working six CMLL shows that year. In late 1998, Lady Apache defeated Tania in a Lucha de Apuestas match, forcing Tania to have her hair shaved off as a result. In 1999, CMLL began promoting their women's division on a more regular basis, signaled by Lady Apache winning the CMLL World Women's Championship for a second time on May 15. Lady Apache worked her last match for CMLL at the time on July 4, 2000. She left the promotion without losing the CMLL World Women's Championship, which forced CMLL to declare it vacant in August.

=== Japan (1994–2012) ===
While working for CMLL, Lady Apache was also allowed to tour Japan to wrestle on several tours. Her first trip to Japan was in January 1992, where she worked for Universal Pro-Wrestling. During the tour, she had two championship opportunities. The first opportunity, on January 19, saw Lady Apache team up with Kaoru Maeda, facing and losing to the team of Manami Toyota and Toshiyo Yamada for the vacant UWA World Women's Tag Team Championship. The second opportunity saw Lady Apache and Mariko Yoshida lose to Kaoru Maeda and Mima Shimoda in a match for the vacant JCTV Women's TV Championship. She returned to Japan in early 1993, saw her compete in a mixed trios tournament, teaming with male wrestlers Oro and Plata, losing to La Diabólica, Scorpio Jr., and Super Delfin in the second round of the tournament.

When Lady Apache returned to Japan in 1995, she worked for Wrestle and Romance (WAR) as the UFF had closed by then. For the tour, she worked primarily against Mexican wrestlers La Pantera and Pantera Sureña. On March 3, 1995, Lady Apache and La Felina competed in a tournament for the vacant WWWA World Tag Team Championship but lost in the first round to Las Cachorras Orientales (Etsuko Mita and Mima Shimoda). She would later work tours for Osaka Pro Wrestling (in 1999) and Arsion (in 1999-2000), but not work for another Japanese promotion until 2011 where she wrestled for Universal Woman's Pro Wrestling Reina. Her last Japanese appearance saw her lose to Princesa Blanca, in a REINA promoted match for the Mexican National Women's Championship.

=== AAA (2000–2005, 2016) ===
Lady Apache left CMLL to join rival promotion AAA, making her in-ring debut for AAA on August 18, 2000. On February 17, 2001, Lady Apache defeated Alda Moreno, Miss Janeth and Tiffany in the 2001 Reina de Reinas ("Queen of Queens") tournament. She would later defend her Reina de Reinas title in Japan, defeating her former step-daughter Faby Apache. Her reign as Reina de Reinas ended on February 23, 2003, as Esther Moreno defeated Apache, Martha Villalobos, and Miss Janeth to win the championship. Three months later, on May 5, Lady Apache defeated Tiffany to win the Mexican National Women's Championship for the first time. The reign lasted a total of 301 days, until March 2, 2003, where Tiffany regained the championship.

While Lady Apache had married professional wrestler Electroshock at some point around joining AAA, this was not commonly known or written into storylines until early 2003. The couple began working as a mixed-gender tag team, participating in a tournament for the newly created AAA World Mixed Tag Team Championship. The two defeated her ex-husband Gran Apache and Faby Apache, El Brazo and Martha Villalobos, and Chessman and Tiffany at Triplemanía XI to become the inaugural champions. Their reign ended after 93 days, as Chessman and Tiffany defeated them on September 16, 2004. Lady Apache started 2004 by winning both the Reina de Reinas and the Mexican National Women's Champion for the second time, defeating Tiffany for both titles. The storyline feud between Lady Apache/Electroshock and Tiffany/Chessman led to a mixed-man Lucha de Apuestas at the 2004 Rey de Reyes ("King of King") show. Lady Apache and Electroshock lost a Pareja Suicidas ("Team Suicide") match and thus were forced to wrestle each other in an intergender match. While Electroshock pinned his wife, he begged the officials to shave his hair off instead of having Lady Apache have her hair cut. In the end, it was allowed, with Electroshock leaving the show bald. Electroshock's willingness to sacrifice his hard led directly to a storyline feud with Electroshock's brother Charly Manson. The two wrestled each other at Triplemanía XII where both brothers risked their careers on the outcome of the match. Manson pinned Electroshock, but after pleading from Lady Apache, Manson agreed to forgo the retirement stipulation as Lady Apache and Electroshock both had their hair shaved off instead. On February 20, 2005, Lady Apache's second reign as Reina de Reinas came to an end at the hands of long-time rival Tiffany. Lady Apache wrestled her last match for AAA at that point in time on May 15, 2005.

Lady Apache returned to AAA 11 years later, teaming with her former stepdaughters Faby and Mari Apache for the 2016 Women's Lucha Libre World Cup. On June 3, 2016, the Apaches defeated Team USA (Cheerleader Melissa, Santana Garrett, and Sienna) in the first round of the tournament. Two days later, the team defeated Team Japan (Aja Kong, Natsu Sumire, and Yuki Miyazaki) to win the Lucha Libre World Cup.

=== Return to CMLL (2005–2013) ===
Lady Apache was still the reigning Mexican National Women's Championship when she left AAA and was given permission by the Comisión de Box y Lucha Libre Mexico D.F. (the Mexico City Boxing and Wrestling Commission) who sanctioned the championship, to keep and defend the championship as she returned to CMLL. Her return to CMLL took place on July 1, where she teamed up with Marcela to defeat La Amapola and Dark Angel. In 2006, Lady Apache began working a storyline feud with then-reigning CMLL World Women's Champion Hiroka. The storyline led to a Lucha de Apuestas at CMLL's 2006 Juico Final show, which Hiroka won, forcing Lady Apache to have all her hair shave off per Lucha Libre traditions. While Hiroka won Lady Apaches' hair, Lady Apache won the CMLL World Women's Championship from Hiroka two months later. Traditionally a Mexican National championship is vacated if the reigning champion wins a world title, but Lady Apache held the Mexican National Women's Championship for an additional six months, not vacating it until April 15, 2007. Lady Apache's third reign as CMLL World Women's Champion lasted 326 days and saw her successfully defend the championship against Hiroka and La Amapola. Lady Apache's next major storyline was against La Amapola, leading to La Amapola's rise up the ranks to the main events of CMLL. Lady Apache defeated La Amapola in a Lucha de Apuestas on that year's Sin Piedad show. Lady Apache won the match, leading to La Amapola being shaved bald. Three months later La Amapola defeated Lady Apache to end Lady Apache's third reign with the CMLL World Women's Championship. On February 6, 2009, Lady Apache, Dark Angel, Goddess, Hiroka, La Amapola, La Nazi, Marcela, La Medusa, Mima Shimoda, Princesa Blanca, and Sahori competed in an 11-woman steel cage match. In the end, Princesa Blanca pinned La Medusa, forcing her to be shaved bald, while Lady Apache escaped the cage to keep her hair safe. For the CMLL 76th Anniversary Show, Lady Apache teamed up with Dark Angel to defeat La Amapola and Hiroka.

On August 20, 2010, it was announced that Lady Apache was pregnant and for that reason had to stop wrestling for at least seven months. She made her return to the wrestling ring at a CMLL event on July 31, 2011. CMLL originally announced a Lucha de Apuestas match between Lady Apache and Princesa Blanca in early 2012, but later canceled the match. Instead, the storyline feud between the two was rolled into a division-wide storyline that led to the main event of the 2012 Infierno en el Ring show. In the main event, 12 women all risked their hair or mask in a steel cage match. In the end, Princesa Blanca pinned Goya Kong, forcing Goya Kong to unmask. By mid-2013 it was announced that Lady Apache had left CMLL.

=== Independent circuit ===
While most of Lady Apache's career has been spent in Mexico, with trips to Japan as well, she also worked for Pro Wrestling Revolution (PWR) in southern California. When PWR announced the creation of the PWR Women's Championship, they selected Lady Apache and Alissa Flash to wrestle for the vacant championship. On February 1, 2010, Lady Apache defeated Alissa Flash to become the first-ever PWR Women's Champion. Her reign lasted 135 days until she lost the championship to Princesa Sugehit on June 14. She regained the title from Princesa Sugehit on September 11, 2011, to start a 321-day reign. La Diabólica defeated Lady Apache on July 18, 2012, to end Apache's reign as PWR Women's Champion.

She has also worked regularly for El Hijo del Santo's Todo X El Todo promotion over the years. On May 11, 2013, Lady Apache teamed up with Chica Tormenta for a Ruleta de la Muerte tournament. Under the tournament rules, the losing team would advance, with the finals seeing the losing team face off in a Lucha de Apuestas match. Apache and Tormenta defeated Christal and Rossy Moreno in the first round to save their hair and mask. As part of the 50th anniversary of the World Wrestling Association, Lady Apache defeated Datura to win the WWA World Women's Championship, a championship that had not been active since 2003. In May and June 2015, Lady Apache competed for the vacant Federación Universal de Lucha Libre Women's Championship, with the final match between Lady Apache and Rossy Moreno ending in a draw and no new champion being determined. In early 2018, Lady Apache teamed up with El Voltron and El Hijo de Voltron to defeat La Hijo del Zombie, Hacha Diabolica, and Hacha Diabolica Jr., thereby winning the AIWA Women's Championship. By 2019 her independent circuit appearances slowed down, with only six recorded matches for the entire year.

== Championships and accomplishments ==
- Asistencia Asesoría y Administración
  - AAA Reina de Reinas Championship (2 times)
  - AAA World Mixed Tag Team Championship (1 time) – with Electroshock
  - Mexican National Women's Championship (2 times)

- Lucha Libre World Cup: 2016 Women's division – with Mary Apache and Faby Apache

- Consejo Mundial de Lucha Libre
  - CMLL World Women's Championship (3 times)
  - Copa Herdez (2011)
- Comision de Box y Lucha D.F.
  - Distrito Federal Women's Championship (1 time)
- Federación Mundial de Lucha Libre
  - AIWA Women's Championship (1 time, current)
- Pro Wrestling Revolution
  - PWR Women's Championship (2 times)
- World Wrestling Association
  - WWA World Women's Championship (1 time, current)

== Luchas de Apuestas record ==
Winner (wager)	Loser (wager)	Location	Event	Date	Notes
Lady Apache (hair)	La Gata (mask)	N/A	independent show	N/A	
Lady Apache (hair)	La Gata (hair)	N/A	independent show	N/A	
Lady Apache (hair)	La Mohicana (hair)	N/A	CMLL show	June 26, 1988	
Lady Apache (hair)	Tania La Guerrillera (hair)	Mexico City	CMLL Domingos De Coliseo	November 15, 1998	
Electroshock (hair)	Lady Apache (Note: Apache and Electroshock vs. Chessman and Tiffany. Lady Apache lost, but Electroshock offered to have his hair shaved instead.) (hair)	Naucalpan, Mexico State	Rey de Reyes	March 21, 2004	
Charly Manson (hair)	Lady Apache and Electroshock (hair)	Naucalpan, Mexico State	Triplemanía XII	July 18, 2004	(Note: Electroshock's career was on the line in the match, but Lady Apache and Electroshock offered to have both their hair shaved off instead of Electroshock retiring.)
Hiroka (hair)	Lady Apache (hair)	Mexico City	CMLL show	October 13, 2006	
Lady Apache (hair)	La Amapola (hair)	Mexico City	Sin Piedad	August 29, 2008	(Note: Lady Apache and La Amapola lost a Relevos suicida match against Princesa Sujei and Marcela and were forced to face each other.)
Lady Apache (hair)	Lady Sensación (hair)	Hidalgo, Texas	independent show	January 5, 2020	
