= La Diabólica =

Mexican female professional wrestler

Personal information
- Born: September 28, 1965 (age 60) Mexico City, Mexico

Professional wrestling career
- Ring names: La Diabólica; La Diabólica del Caribe; La Felina; La Pantera
- Billed height: 1.55 m (5 ft 1 in)
- Billed weight: 60 kg (132 lb)
- Trained by: Jesse Rojas; Charro del Misterio
- Debut: June 1986

La Diabólica (real name unknown; born September 28, 1965) is a Mexican professional wrestler best known from her work in the Mexican professional wrestling promotions Consejo Mundial de Lucha Libre (CMLL) and Asistencia Asesoría y Administración (AAA). La Diabólica is a former two time CMLL World Women's Champion and a former Mexican National Women's Champion. La Diabólica worked as a ruda (villain or heel) for almost her entire career. Her ring name, "La Diabólica" means "The Diabolical One" in Spanish. La Diabólica's real name is not a matter of public record, as is often the case with masked wrestlers in Mexico where their private lives are kept a secret from the wrestling fans.

== Professional wrestling career ==
La Diabólica made her professional wrestling debut in 1986, originally wrestling as "La Diabólica del Caribe" ("the Diabolical one from the Caribbean") but soon shortened it to just "La Diabólica". Her Ruda (villain) character was enhanced by the black tights and boots with red flame trim and mask with a bat symbol on it that she wears while wrestling.

=== Consejo Mundial de Lucha Libre ===
By the early 1990s La Diabólica worked regularly for Consejo Mundial de Lucha Libre (CMLL) as they tried to establish a women's wrestling division. The Mexican National Women's Championship had been vacated in early 1993 when then champion La Sirenita became pregnant. CMLL did not crown a new champion until August, 1993 when they held a tournament. La Diabólica won the tournament to become the Mexican National Women's Champion. She held the title until October 10, 1993 when she defeated Xóchitl Hamada to become the third ever CMLL World Women's Champion and thus vacated the lesser Mexican National title. La Diabólica held the title until July 30, 1994 when she lost it to Reina Jubuki (Now known as Akira Hokutu). From 1995 until the late 1990s, CMLL rarely featured the Women's division, only sporadically booking La Diabólica and the other Luchadoras. In the late 1990s CMLL tried to establish a foothold in Japan, creating CMLL Japan in cooperation with various minor Japanese leagues. La Diabólica defeated Chikako Shiratori to win the CMLL Japan Women's Championship during a tour of Japan in November 1999 but lost it back to Shiratori on November 25, 1999 before returning to Mexico. in August 2000 then reigning CMLL World Women's champion Lady Apache left the promotion, frustrated over the lack of work, in the process she vacated the title. Instead of holding a tournament CMLL awarded the title to La Diabólica at some point in 2001 as she was the top contender for the women's title. Over the next year or two, CMLL only featured the Women's champion on a handful of shows each year, leading La Diabólica to leave the promotion, frustrated with the lack of work. When she left the promotion she vacated the CMLL World Women's Championship. As an indicator of how slow the women's division was at the time, CMLL did not crown a new Women's champion until September 2005.

=== Asistencia Asesoría y Administración ===
La Diabólica jumped from CMLL to its main Mexican rival Asistencia Asesoría y Administración (AAA) who had a very active women's division at the time. In 2005, she teamed up with Chessman to compete in a tournament for the newly created AAA World Mixed Tag Team Championship but lost to Cynthia Moreno and El Oriental at the 2005 Guerra de Titanes show. At the 2006 Rey de Reyes show she teamed up with Chikayo Nagashima, Tiffany and Carlos Amano to defeat Cinthia Moreno, Martha Villalobos, Lola Gonzales, and Miss Janeth. At the 2007 Guerra de Titanes La Diabólica once again competed for the vacant AAA World Mixed Tag Team Championship, this time teaming up with Espiritu but lost to Gran Apache and Mari Apache. La Diabólica competed in the 2008 Reina de Reinas ("Queen of Queens") tournament but lost in the Semi Final to Ayako Hamada.

=== Independent circuit ===
In mid-2009 La Diabólica left AAA, choosing to wrestle on the Mexican independent circuit instead, including several appearances for International Wrestling Revolution Group (IWRG). She also won the Distrito Federatl Women's Championship not long after leaving AAA. In October, 2009 she teamed up with Zumbido, losing a match for the vacant IVP Mixed Tag Team Championship to Rossy Moreno and El Oriental, in a match that also included the husband and wife team of Pentagon Black and Xóchtil Hamada. On October 25, 2009 La Diabólica teamed up with Flor Metalica and Josselin to defeat the Japanese trio known as Revolución Amandla (Atsuko Emoto, Kyoko Kimura and Tomoka Nakagawa) on an IWRG show, following which Metalica challenged La Diabólica to defend her Distrito Federal title against her. On October 15, 2009 La Diabólica successfully defended her Distrito Federal Women's title against Flor Metalica.

== Personal life ==
La Diabólica was formerly married to fellow wrestler Rey Bucanero. They divorced in 2007 following an incident concerning the custody of their children. A son of theirs' wrestles with a combination of his parents names as Rey Diablo.

== Championships and accomplishments ==
- Comision de Box y Lucha D.F.
  - Distrito Federal Women's Championship (1 time; current)
- Consejo Mundial de Lucha Libre
  - CMLL Japan Women's Championship (1 time)
  - CMLL World Women's Championship (2 times)
  - Mexican National Women's Championship (1 time)

== Luchas de Apuestas record ==
Winner (wager)	Loser (wager)	Location	Event	Date	Notes
La Diabólica (mask)	Wendy (mask)	Mexico City	Live event	N/A	
La Diabólica (mask)	Selene (mask)	Mexico City	Live event	N/A	
La Diabólica (mask)	La Olímpica (mask)	Mexico City	Live event	N/A	
La Diabólica (mask)	La Yaqui (mask)	Mixcoac, Mexico	Live event	May 3, 1987	
La Diabólica (mask)	Kaoru (mask)	Mexico City	Live event	March 21, 1993	
La Diabólica (mask)	La Practicante (mask)	Mexico City	Live event	N/A	
La Diabólica (mask)	Tuna Turako (mask)	Mexico City	Live event	N/A	
