= Estela Molina =

Mexican professional wrestler (1948–2025)

Personal information
- Born: Evelina Molin; March 13, 1948 Mexico
- Died: August 28, 2025 (aged 77)

Professional wrestling career
- Ring name(s): Estela Molina; Estelle Molina; India Azteca
- Billed height: 5 ft 5 in (1.65 m)
- Billed weight: 154 lb (70 kg)
- Trained by: Diablo Velasco
- Debut: 1969
- Retired: 1996

Evelina Molina (13 March 1948 – 28 August 2025) was a Mexican professional wrestler. She is recognized as the first Mexican woman to win a world championship in the history of professional wrestling, capturing the UWA World Women's Championship in 1979. Over a career spanning nearly three decades, she became one of the leading figures in women's wrestling in Mexico and is credited with helping to expand opportunities for subsequent generations of female wrestlers.

== Early life ==
Molina was born on 13 March 1948 in Ciudad Guzmán, Jalisco.

== Career ==
Molina began her professional career in 1969, after training under the guidance of the renowned Cuauhtémoc "Diablo" Velasco. She quickly became a recurring name on arena cards throughout Mexico.

Molina's breakthrough came on 31 March 1979 in a high-stakes hair vs. hair match against Pantera Sureña at the now-defunct Toreo de Cuatro Caminos, which she won. That same year, to great national acclaim, she made history by defeating American wrestler Vickie Williams to become the first Mexican woman to win the UWA World Women's Championship, in a match also held at the Toreo. Contemporary reports described the match as "so brutal that even Molina shouted to the referee Carlos Duarte to call it." The victory was celebrated as a breakthrough at a time when women's wrestling in Mexico faced restrictions, including prohibitions on female wrestlers performing in certain arenas. Molina held the championship for only four months before Williams regained it in a rematch in Monterrey.

Known for her distinctive style and aggressive presence in the ring, Molina became one of the leading figures in Mexican women's wrestling. Throughout her career, she engaged in intense rivalries with wrestlers such as Vicky Carranza and Reyna Gallegos, the latter of whom defeated her in a high-profile match in 1987, leading to the loss of her hair. Her career extended until the mid-1990s, giving her nearly three decades in the ring.

Molina is remembered as a pioneer of women's wrestling in Mexico, credited with paving the way for future generations at a time of significant restrictions.

== Death ==
Molina died on 28 August 2025 in Guadalajara. The cause of death was not disclosed, although in July 2025 wrestler Pantera Sureña reported that Molina had been in serious condition and bedridden.
