= Mexican National Women's Tag Team Championship =

Mexican professional wrestling championship

Mexican National Women's Tag Team Championship (Campeonato Nacional de Parejas Femenil)
- The championship belts

Details
- Promotion: Comisión de Box y Lucha Libre México D.F. (Note: Duncan & Will (2000) p. 399, Chapter: Mexico: National Women's Tag Team Title); AAA (1992–1997); Consejo Mundial de Lucha Libre (2020–present)
- Date established: April 10, 1990
- Current champions: Las Valientitas (Hera and Olympia)
- Date won: September 25, 2026
Statistics
- First champions: Irma González and Irma Aguilar
- Most reigns: La Briosa (2 reigns with different partners)
- Longest reign: La Jarochita and Lluvia (1,238 days)
- Shortest reign: Vicky Carranza and La Briosa (No more than 46 days)

The Mexican National Women's Tag Team Championship (Spanish: Campeonato Nacional Femenil de Parejas) is a Mexican national professional wrestling championship that is run exclusively for tag teams of women wrestlers. The championship is sanctioned and controlled by the Comisión de Box y Lucha Libre México D.F. (Mexico City Boxing and Wrestling Commission), and is promoted by Consejo Mundial de Lucha Libre (CMLL). Because it is a professional wrestling championship, the winner of the Mexican National Women's Tag Team Championship is decided by a scripted ending to a match rather that by actual competition. The current champions are Las Valientitas (Hera and Olympia), who are in their first reign as a team and individually. They won the title by defeating Kira and Skadi at Noche de Campeones on September 25, 2026.

The championship was introduced in April 1990; the mother/daughter team of Irma González and Irma Aguilar defeated Neftali and Satanakia in the finals of a tournament to become the inaugural champions. Five teams held the championship between 1991 and 1997, when it was abandoned. No team held the championship more than twice but La Briosa held it with two different partners; Vicky Carranza and Neftali. The last championship team was La Rosa and La Sirenita, who won it on January 19, 1996, and defended their title until 1997. On March 4, 2020, CMLL announced that it would revive the championship.

== History ==
In 1990, the Comisión de Box y Lucha Libre México D.F. (Mexico City Boxing and Wrestling Commission) created and sanctioned the Mexican National Women's Tag Team Championship (Campeonato Nacional de Parejas Femenil). Unlike the majority of the Mexican National Championships at the time, this was not controlled by Consejo Mundial de Lucha Libre (CMLL) but was promoted on the Mexican independent circuit. Records are unclear on which teams participated in the tournament to crown the first champions but state the mother/daughter team Irma González and Irma Aguilar defeated Neftali and Satanakia on April 10, 1990, in a show in Xochimilico, Mexico City, to become the inaugural winners. Their reign lasted for 619 days, although it is unclear how many championship defenses the team made during the time, if any.

On December 20, 1991, Martha Villalobos and Pantera Sureña won the championship in an independent-circuit show in Mexico City. No records for championship defenses between December 1991 and February 19, 1994, have been found but it is recorded Vicky Carranza and La Briosa won the championship on that date to become the third champions. During the subsequent 46 days, Carrenza and Briosa disbanded the team, leaving the championship vacant. The Commission allowed both women to select a new tag-team partner to contest the vacant championship. La Briosa and Neftali defeated Vicki Carranza and La Medusa to claim the championship in a show promoted by AAA. This was the first time the championship was promoted by AAA, one of Mexico's largest, national wrestling companies. The titles were next defended in AAA 653 days later as La Rosa and La Sirenita defeated Briosa and Neftali by count-out on January 19, 1996, and the championship changed hands. (Note: In most wrestling promotions a count out ending usually means that the championship does not change hands.) By 1997, the championship stopped being promoted and neither champion ever referred to the title or wore the championship belts to the ring.

On its March 4, 2020 Informa show, CMLL announced it was re-introducing the Mexican National Women's Tag Team Championship and would hold a tag-team tournament over three Sunday shows between March 15 and 29, 2020, as part of CMLL's Sunday Arena México show. It was originally planned for March to coincide with Women's History Month. The tournament will consist of ten teams, split into two qualifying blocks. For each block all five teams will participate in a battle royal where the winning team will move to the semifinal, while the other four teams will be required to compete against each other. Due to the COVID-19 pandemic, the tournament was postponed. In September, CMLL announced that the tournament would start on October 5 as part of their weekly CMLL Super Viernes shows.

Block A

- La Comandante and La Seductora
- La Magnifica and Silueta
- Marcela and Skadi
- Reyna Isis and Tiffany
- La Amapola and La Metálica

Block B

- Princesa Sugehit and Sanely
- Dalys and Stephanie Vaquer
- Estrellita and Mystique
- La Vaquerita and La Guerrera
- La Jarochita and Lluvia

=== Tournament brackets ===
Round of 16
La Amapola and La Metálica	W
La Magnifica and Silueta
Marcela and Skadi	W
La Comandante and La Seductora
Bye
Bye
Bye
Reyna Isis and Tiffany
Dalys and Stephanie Vaquer	W
Estrellita and Mystique
La Vaquerita and La Guerrera
Princesa Sugehit and Sanely	W
Bye
Bye
Bye
La Jarochita and Lluvia

Quarterfinals
La Amapola and Metálica	W
Marcela and Skadi
Bye
Reyna Isis and Tiffany
Dalys and Stephanie Vaquer
Princesa Sugehit and Sanely	W
Bye
La Jarochita and Lluvia

Semifinals
La Amapola and Metálica	W
Reyna Isis and Tiffany
Princesa Sugehit and Sanely
La Jarochita and Lluvia	W

Finals
La Amapola and Metálica
La Jarochita and Lluvia	W

== Reigns ==
Six teams consisting of eleven different individuals held the championship between 1990 and 1997. La Briosa is the only person to have held the championship twice so far, having won it with Vicky Carrenza and Neftali. Briosa and Carrenza's reign lasted 46 days before the team broke up and the championship was vacated; it is the shortest reign so far. La Jarochita and Lluvia's 1,238-day reign from October 17, 2020 until March 8, 2024, is the longest in the history of the championship.

Las Valientitas (Hera and Olympia) are the current champions in their first reign as a team and individually. They won the title by defeating Kira and Skadi at Noche de Campeones in Mexico City, Mexico, on September 25, 2026.

== Rules ==
As with all professional wrestling championships, matches for the Mexican National Women's Tag Team Championship were won by a pre-planned ending whose outcome is determined by bookers and match makers rather that through actual competition. (Note: Hornbaker (2016) p. 550: "Professional wrestling is a sport in which match finishes are predetermined. Thus, win–loss records are not indicative of a wrestler's genuine success based on their legitimate abilities – but on now much, or how little they were pushed by promoters") Occasionally a promotion declared the championship vacant, meaning there was no title holder at that time. This was either due to a storyline, (Note: Duncan & Will (2000) p. 271, Chapter: Texas: NWA American Tag Team Title [World Class, Adkisson] "Championship held up and rematch ordered because of the interference of manager Gary Hart") or real-life issues such as an injured champion being unable to defend the championship, (Note: Duncan & Will (2000) p. 20, Chapter: (United States: 19th Century & widely defended titles – NWA, WWF, AWA, IW, ECW, NWA) NWA/WCW TV Title "Rhodes stripped on 85/10/19 for not defending the belt after having his leg broken by Ric Flair and Ole & Ar<n Anderson") or leaving the company. (Note: Duncan & Will (2000) p. 201, Chapter: (Memphis, Nashville) Memphis: USWA Tag Team Title "Vacant on 93/01/18 when Spike leaves the USWA.") Up until late 2021, all championship matches promoted in Mexico took place under best two-out-of-three falls rules. (Note: Comisión de Box y Lucha Libre p. 44 "Articulo 258.- Cada combate de lucha libre tendrá como limite tres caídas; cada caída será sin limite de tiempo, ganará quien obtenga dos caídas de las tres en disputa" ("Article 258.- Each wrestling match shall have as limit three falls; Each fall will be without time limit. The winner will be the one to first obtain two of the three falls in the match"))

Officially, only Mexican citizens may either challenge for or hold the Mexican National Women's Tag Team Championship although exceptions exist, such as the Puerto Rican Zeuxis winning the Mexican National Women's Championship. As is the case for all the Mexican National titles, the championship may generally not be defended in any type of match other than a regular tag-team-match format. The Comisión de Box y Lucha Libre México D.F. has enforced the rules inconsistently; in one case they stripped Psicosis of the Mexican National Middleweight Championship for defending it in a hardcore match. (Note: Duncan & Will (2000) p. 392, chapter: Mexico: National Middleweight Championship) In another case, it allowed the Mexican National Heavyweight Championship to change hands in a steel cage match.

== Title history ==
Key
No.	Overall reign number
Reign	Reign number for the specific team—reign numbers for the individuals are in parentheses, if different
Days	Number of days held

No.	Champion	Championship change			Reign statistics		Notes	Ref.
No.	Champion	Date	Event	Location	Reign	Days	Notes	Ref.
Comisión de Box y Lucha Libre México D.F.
1	Irma González and Irma Aguilar	April 10, 1990	Live event	Xochimilico, Mexico City	1	619	Defeated Neftali and Satanakia in the finals of a tournament to become the first women's tag team champions.	
2	Martha Villalobos and Pantera Sureña	December 20, 1991	Live event	Mexico City	1	792		
Lucha Libre AAA Worldwide (AAA)
3	Vicky Carranza and La Briosa	February 19, 1994	Live event	Xochimilico, Mexico City	1	(Note: The exact date the championship was vacated is uncertain, which means the reign lasted between 1 day and 46 days)		
—	Vacated	1994	—	—	—	—	Vicky Carranza and La Briosa split up.	
4	Las Nasty Girls (La Briosa (2) and Neftali)	April 6, 1994	AAA show	Apatlaco, Mexico City	1	653	Carranza and Briosa were both allowed to pick a new partner, with La Briosa and Neftali defeating Carranza and La Medusa to win the championship.	
5	La Rosa and La Sirenita	January 19, 1996	AAA show	Apatlaco, Mexico City	1	N/A (Note: the length of the reign is too uncertain to calculate)	Won the match, and championship, by count out	
—	Deactivated	1997	—	—	—	—	Championship was not referred to after this point in time.	
Consejo Mundial de Lucha Libre (CMLL)
6	Las Chicas Indomables (La Jarochita and Lluvia)	October 17, 2020	Super Viernes	México City, México	1	1,238	Defeated La Amapola and La Metálica 2-1 in a two-out-of-three falls tag team match. This was the finals of a three-week tournament to crown the new champions.	
7	Andrómeda/Kira and Skadi	March 8, 2024	CMLL función especial conmemorando el Día Internacional de la Mujer	Mexico City, Mexico	1	931	During this reign, Andrómeda defended the title under the ring name Kira.	
8	Las Valientitas (Olympia and Hera)	September 25, 2026	Noche de Campeones	Mexico City, Mexico	1	54+		
