= Marcela (wrestler) =

Mexican female professional wrestler

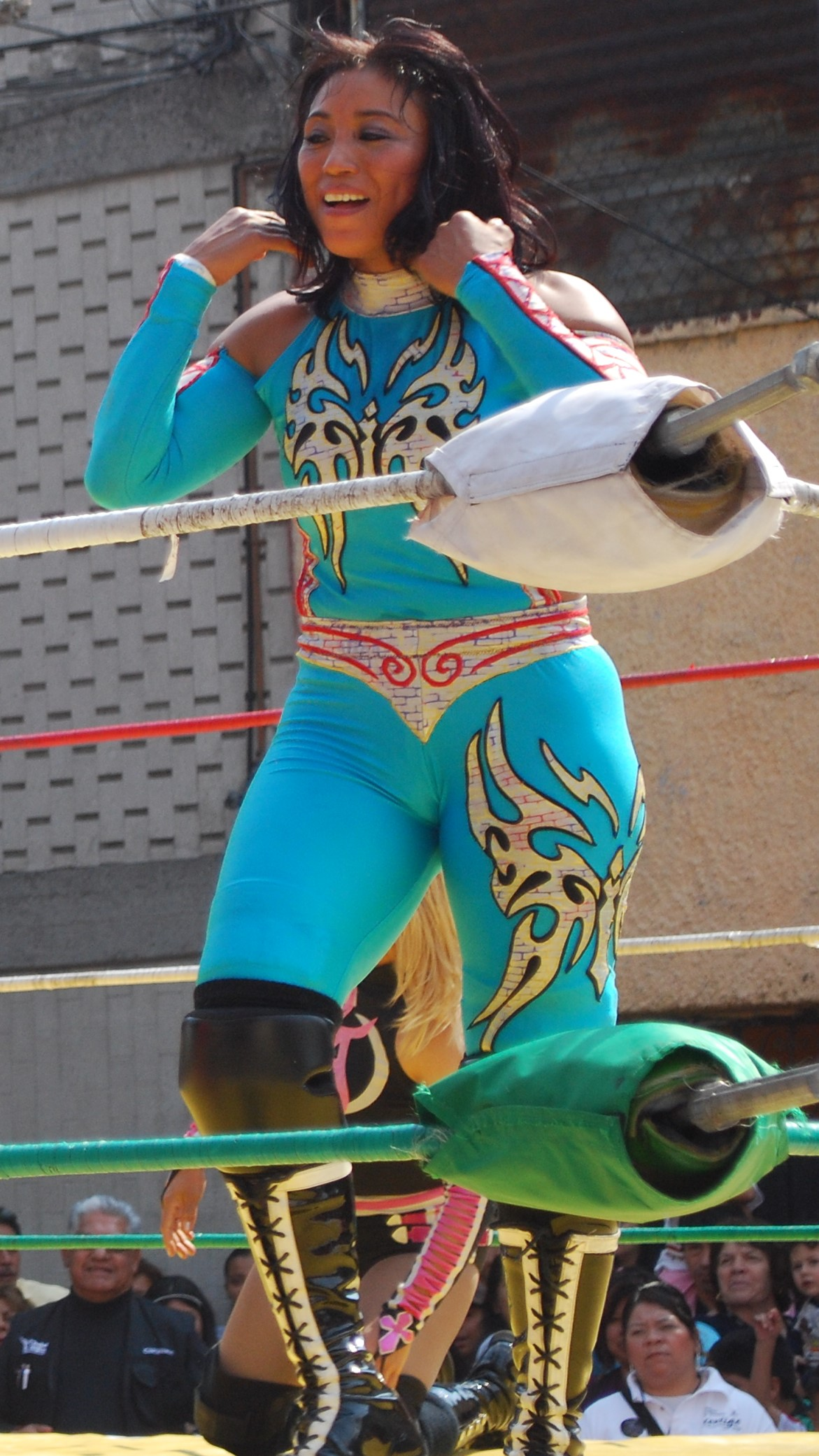
- Marcela in the ring in 2013

Personal information
- Born: María Elena Santamaría Gómez; May 31, 1971 (age 55) Mexico City, Mexico
- Children: Skadi (daughter)

Professional wrestling career
- Ring name: Marcela
- Billed height: 1.55 m (5 ft 1 in)
- Billed weight: 60 kg (132 lb)
- Trained by: Panchito Villalobos; Rafael Salamanca; Franco Columbo
- Debut: December 1985

María Elena Santamaría Gómez (born May 31, 1971) is a Mexican professional wrestler working for Consejo Mundial de Lucha Libre (CMLL) under the ring name Marcela. Santamaría has worked for CMLL since the early 1990s and has also wrestled for various promotions in Japan and on the Mexican independent circuit, as well as Ring of Honor (ROH) in the United States.

Marcela holds the record for the most reigns as CMLL World Women's Champion, having held it five times. She is also a former Mexican National Women's Champion, District Federal Women's Champion (which she held for over five years) and XMW Women's Champion. She holds several major Lucha de Apuestas ("bet match") victories, winning the masks of La Gata, Rosa Negra and La Seductora, as well as the hair of La Briosa, Tiffany, Dalys la Caribeña and Princesa Blanca. Her daughter is also a professional wrestler, known under the name Skadi.

== Early life ==
María Elena Santamaría Gómez was born on May 31, 1971, in Mexico City, Mexico. She grew up in Mexico City, living close to Arena Coliseo, where Empresa Mexicana de Lucha Libre (EMLL) held several wrestling events each week. Her mother was a fan and brought her daughter to the shows from a young age. Initially, when Marcela wanted to become a professional wrestler, her mother opposed it, causing a rift between them at the time, which was later reconciled. Marcela had her first child at the age of 16. Her second child, a daughter, became a professional wrestler as well, working under the ring name Skadi; she often teams with her mother.

== Professional wrestling career ==
Santamaría began training for her professional wrestling career in the mid-1980s, at a time when female wrestling was banned in Mexico City itself and only promoted by a few companies outside the capitol. She made her debut in December 1985 in Actopan, Hidalgo. For her debut, she borrowed an ill-fitting mask and boxing shoes, as she did not have any of her own. After the match, she decided to never wear a mask again. She was billed simply as "Marcela" as she began working on the independent circuit. The ban on women's wrestling was lifted in 1986, allowing EMLL and other promotion's shows in the capitol to employ female wrestlers.

=== Consejo Mundial de Lucha Libre (early 1990s–present) ===
In the early 1990s, Marcela joined Consejo Mundial de Lucha Libre (CMLL), winning her first Lucha de Apuestas ("bet match", the most prestigious match type in lucha libre) against La Migala on September 7, 1991, forcing La Migala to have her hair shaved off after the match. During the mid-1990s to early 2000s, CMLL's women's division received minimal attention, prompting Marcela to wrestle for various minor promotions on the Mexican independent circuit. On August 3, 2001, Marcela and male wrestler El Mohicano I defeated La Gata and Black Machine in an intergender Lucha de Apuestas, leaving their male and female opponents with bald heads. She also competed in a torneo cibernetico elimination match for International Wrestling Revolution Group (IWRG)'s newly created Intercontinental Women's Championship, which was won by Ayako Hamada.

In 2004, Marcela was given a full-time role with CMLL, coinciding with their renewed focus on women's wrestling. At some point prior to September 20, Marcela won the Distrito Federal Women's Championship, with a successful defense against La Amapola on that day. After she and Dark Angel outlasted Hiroka, India Sioux, La Medusa, La Nazi, Linda Star, Princesa Sujei and Sahori to qualify for the finals of a tournament for the vacant CMLL World Women's Championship, Marcela defeated Dark Angel to win it at the CMLL 72nd Anniversary Show on September 16. She defended the title against Hiroka and La Amapola several times before losing it to Hiroka on June 9, 2006. Marcela and Sujey outlasted twelve other women in a torneo cibernetico to qualify for the finals of a tournament for the vacant Mexican National Women's Championship, followed by Marcela defeating her for the title. Marcela recorded one successful defense against La Amapola on August 5, 2007, before losing the championship to Princesa Blanca on January 30, 2009, ending her reign at 637 days. On April 12, Marcela defeated and unmasked Rosa Negra in a Lucha de Apuestas at 53. Aniversario de Arena México. Marcela defeated La Amapola on October 28, 2011, to win her second CMLL World Women's Championship, but lost it after 29-days to Ayumi Kurihara in Japan. She travelled to Mexico in March 2012 and lost the title back to Marcela on March 9. During her third reign, Marcela successfully defended the championship on twelve occasions in Mexico, the United States and Japan.

Marcela risked her hair in the main event ten-woman steel cage match of Infierno en el Ring ("Inferno in the Ring") on June 29, keeping it safe as the third woman to escape the cage. During this time, Marcela began a storyline feud with the debuting Tiffany of Los Invasores ("The Invaders"), a group representing CMLL's main rival, AAA. It led to a Lucha de Apuestas on August 5, where Marcela pinned Tiffany and forced her to have her hair cut off. Marcela's next major feud was with rising female star Dalys la Caribeña; the two met in a Lucha de Apuestas at Homenaje a Dos Leyendas ("Homage to Two Legends") on March 21, 2014, which Marcela won. In another Lucha de Apuestas on August 1 at Juicio Final ("Final Judgment"), Marcela teamed with Sugej to defeat Blanca and La Seductora, who was forced to unmask, whereas Blanca was shaved bald and forced into retirement. Marcela lost her title after 1,008 days to Syuri in Japan, but regained it to begin her fourth reign on the last day of Syuri's Mexico tour on April 10, 2015. She successfully defended the title against Dalys and Zeuxis, but it to Dalys on March 11, 2016. On August 6, 2017, Marcela and Zeuxis outlasted seven other female wrestlers in a torneo cibernetico to qualify for the finals of a tournament for the vacant CMLL-Reina International Championship the following week, where Zeuxis pinned Marcela to win the title. She defeatd Dalys for her fifth CMLL World Women's Championship reign on November 19, 2018, making successful defenses against then-reigning Mexican National Women's Champion La Metálica on April 29, 2019, and La Amapola in July.

Marcela competed in the inaugural Universal Amazonas Championship tournament in August in the first block of eight wrestlers, but was eliminated by Avispa Dorada. When Dalys defeated La Metálica in the finals, she earned a title match with Marcela on September 27 at the CMLL 86th Anniversary Show. However, the match was cancelled as Marcela suffered an ankle injury leading up to the show and was unable to compete. Marcela successfully defended the title against Dalys in December and at the CMLL 87th Anniversary Show via disqualification on September 25, 2020. Following the event, Marcela and her daughter, Skadi, participated in a tournament for the Mexican National Women's Tag Team Championship, defeating La Comandante and La Seductora in the first round, but lost to La Amapola and La Metálica in the quarter-finals. She lost the CMLL World Women's Championship to Sugehit on October 23. At Homenaje a Dos Leyendas on March 17, 2023, Marcela participated in the Copa Irma Gonzáles, where she eliminated La Amapola before being eliminated by Lluvia. She won the following year's edition of the tournament on March 8, 2024. On March 20, 2026, at Homenaje a Dos Leyendas, Marcela, La Magnífica and Sugehit were involved in a hair vs. hair three-way elimination match. In the end, Marcela pinned Sugehit and forced her to have all of her hair shaved off.

=== Japan (1999–2019) ===
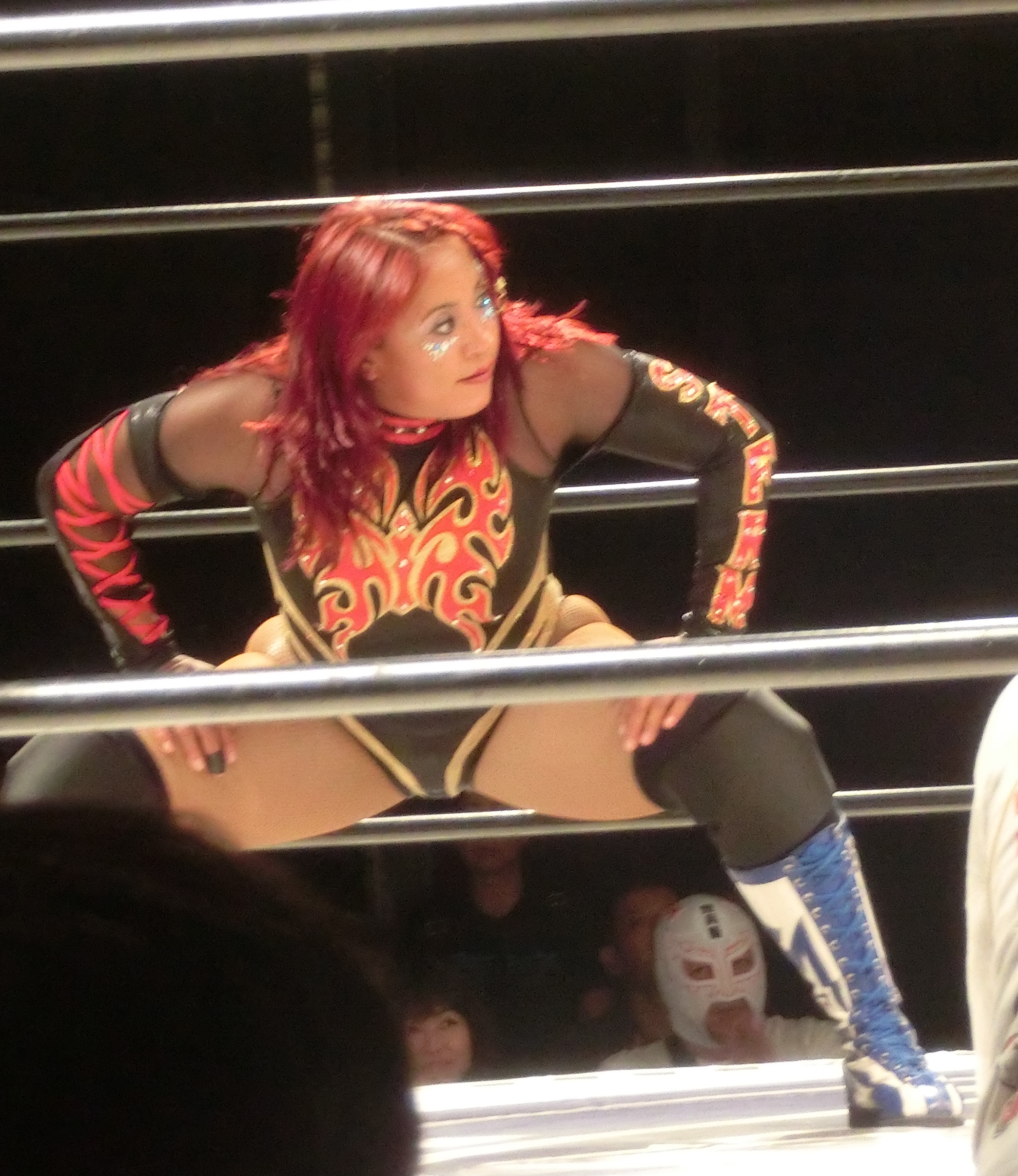
Marcela in Japan in 2019

CMLL has partnered with several Japanese wrestling promotions, sending their female representatives to female-only Japanese promotions. Marcela's first major tour of Japan ran from August to September 1999, where she worked for Big Japan Pro-Wrestling (BJW), starting with a victory over male exótico Andromeda on August 2. She later returned to Japan for individual BJW matches in October and December. She worked a second extended BJW tour from January 2, 2000, to March 31, 2001, frequently teaming with and facing off against Chihiro Nakano. She returned to BJW in 2010 for their 15th Anniversary Death tour. Marcela next worked with NEO Women's Pro Wrestling, Japanese Women Pro-Wrestling Project, International Women's * Grand Prix, and JDStar between 2001 and 2010.

On May 5, 2011, Marcela unsuccessfully challenged La Amapola for the CMLL Women's World Championship at the debut show of Universal Woman's Pro Wrestling REINA. In November 2011, she returned, this time as CMLL Women's World Champion, but lost the title to Ayumi Kurihara at a REINA show. Two years later, Marcela returned to unsuccessfully challenge Ray for the CMLL Women's World Championship. Her 2014 return saw Marcela successfully turn back the challenge of Syuri on August 30, although she lost the title to Syuri on December 12, marking her third time losing it in Japan. Marcela later returned to Japan for a tour including successful championship defenses against Tae Honma on January 27, 2019, and Tsukushi on September 15.

=== Mexican independent circuit (2005–present) ===
Marcela, like all CMLL workers, is allowed to take independent circuit bookings on her off days. However, her independent work decreased as CMLL increased the promotion of women's wrestling. One of her most significant independent matches was a six-woman steel cage match where the last woman in the cage would be shaved bald or forced to remove her mask. In the end, Marcela pinned La Migala, forcing her to be shaved bald afterward. She also regularly worked for Toryumon Mexico, a company CMLL had a close working relationship with.

CMLL has allowed Marcela to defend the CMLL World Women's Championship on non-CMLL shows. For example, she defended the championship against La Amapola at a show in Nezahualcoyotl in 2005. She later challenged for the championship, but lost to La Amapola at a show in Guatemala, and had a successful defense against La Amapola during her third reign. September 9, 2012 saw Marcela outlast 11 other women to win the Copa Femenil Realizada tournament. Later that year, Marcela defeated Ludark Shaitan to win the Xtrem Mexican Wrestling's Women's Championship. The match was the only time that Marcela worked for XMW and never lost the championship in the ring. On February 29, 2020, Marcela survived a six-way hair vs. mask match, escaping before India Sioux pinned Casandra to win the match and the right to cut Casandra's hair off.

=== Ring of Honor (2017) ===
Through CMLL's partnership with the US-based Ring of Honor (ROH), Marcela appeared at Supercard of Honor XI on April 1, 2017, where she defeated La Amapola on the pre-show.

== Championships and accomplishments ==
- Comision de Box y Lucha D.F.
  - Distrito Federal Women's Championship (1 time)
- Consejo Mundial de Lucha Libre
  - CMLL World Women's Championship (5 times)
  - Mexican National Women's Championship (1 time)
  - Copa Irma Gonzáles (2024)
  - Copa Bobby Bonales (2017)
- Pro Wrestling Illustrated
  - Ranked No. 73 of the top 100 female singles wrestlers in the PWI Women's 100 in 2020
- Xtreme Mexican Wrestling
  - XMW Women's Championship (1 time, current)

== Luchas de apuestas record ==
Winner (wager)	Loser (wager)	Location	Event	Date	Notes
Marcela (hair)	La Gata (mask)	N/A	Live event	N/A	
Marcela (hair)	La Briosa (hair)	N/A	Live event	N/A	
Marcela (hair)	La Migala (hair)	San Juan Pantitlan. Mexico	Live event	September 7, 1991	
El Mohicano I and Marcela (hair)	Black Machine and La Gata (hair)	San Juan Pantitlan. Mexico	Live event	August 3, 2001	
Marcela (hair)	La Migala (hair)	San Juan Pantitlan. Mexico	Live event	March 18, 2005	(Note: The match also included Josseline, La Amapola, La Briosa and La Fugitiva.)
Marcela (hair)	Rosa Negra (mask)	Mexico City	53. Aniversario de Arena México	April 12, 2009	
Marcela (hair)	Tiffany (hair)	Mexico City	Live event	August 5, 2012	
Marcela (hair)	Dalys la Caribeña (hair)	Mexico City	Homenaje a Dos Leyendas	March 21, 2014	
Marcela (hair) and Princesa Sugehit (mask)	Princesa Blanca (hair) and La Seductora (mask)	Mexico City	El Juicio Final	August 1, 2014	
Marcela (hair)	Princesa Sugehit (hair)	Mexico City	Homenaje a Dos Leyendas	March 20, 2026	
