= La Comandante =

Mexican professional wrestler

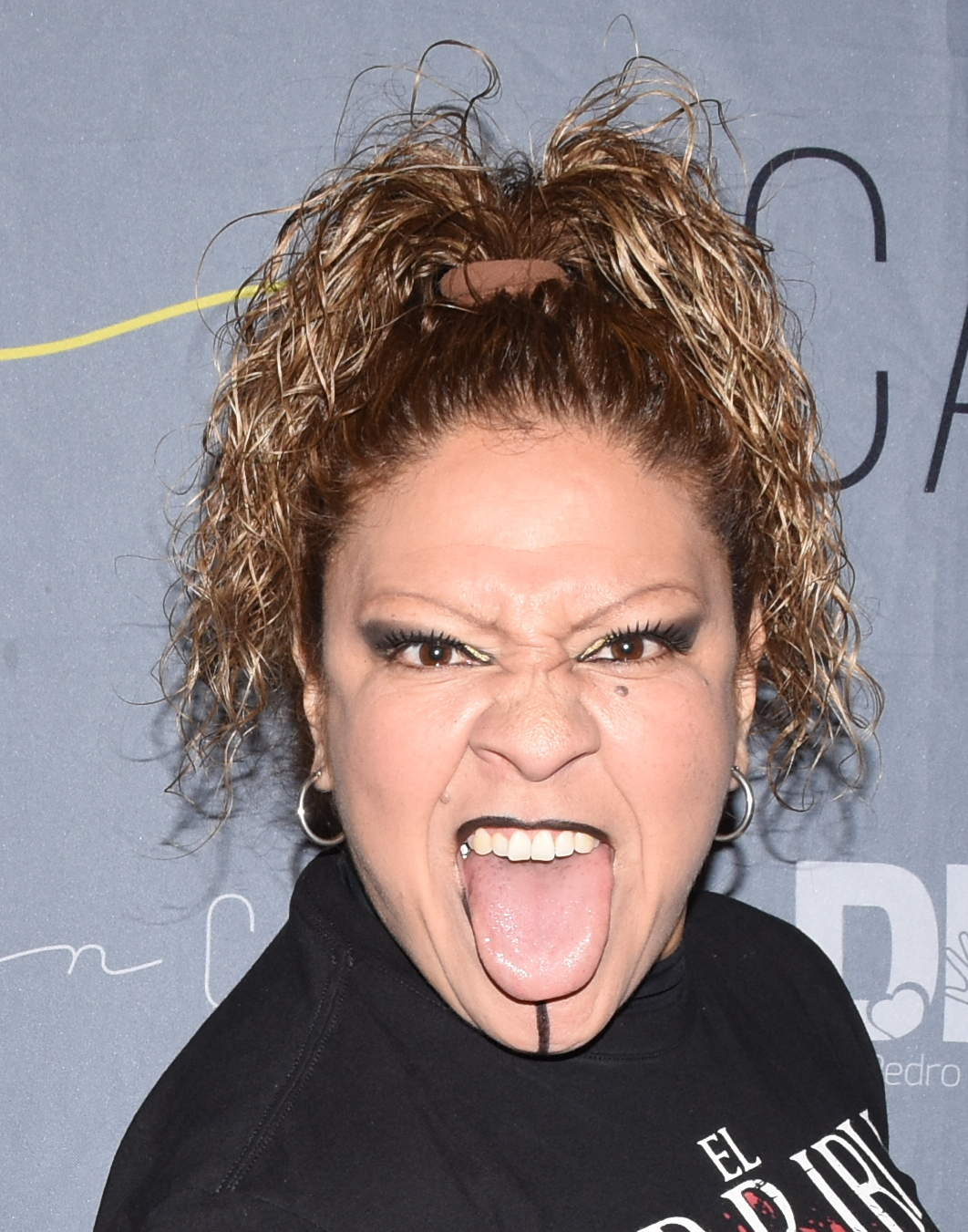
- La Comandate in 2017.

Personal information
- Born: April 23, 1978 (age 48) Ecatepec, State of Mexico

Professional wrestling career
- Ring name(s): La Comandante; La Nazi; Nassy
- Billed height: 1.75 m (5 ft 9 in)
- Billed weight: 90 kg (198 lb)
- Trained by: Felipe Ham Lee; Shadito Cruz; José Aarón Alvarado Nieves; Karloff Lagarde
- Debut: February 23, 1996

Norma Martínez (born April 23, 1978), known by the ring name La Comandante, is a Mexican professional wrestler and manager working for the Mexican promotion Consejo Mundial de Lucha Libre (CMLL) portraying a ruda ("bad guy") wrestling character.

== Professional wrestling career ==
She began her career working under the ring name La Nazi (The Nazi), inspired by El Nazi, a hated Mexican rudo (a bad guy character or heel). Her initial days as a professional wrestler were challenging; she faced considerable resistance, with complaints that she was too rough in the ring and not providing sufficient protection to her opponents during matches. Her reputation for working "stiff", as it is called in wrestling, made it so hard for her to get work that she retired in the late 1990s. During her retirement she worked in a furniture factory and as a tailor. She did not return to full-time wrestling until she met wrestler Pierroth, Jr. who helped her improve in the ring and get regular work as well. La Nazi participated in AAA's first ever Reina de Reinas tournament, but lost a qualifying match to Rossy Moreno. When Pierroth, Jr. created his Los Boriquas ("The Puerto Ricans") group in Consejo Mundial de Lucha Libre La Nazi became his constant companion, adopting a look that was more "guerilla soldier" than Nazi as she began wearing more camouflage pants and shirts. At some point while working as La Nazi she won a Luchas de Apustas, ("bet match") over Chica de Arabia where her opponent was shaved bald after the match. She also defeated Exotico (a man using an effeminate or crossdressing ring character) Estrella de Fuego to unmask him. On April 27, 2007 La Nazi competed to in a tournament to crown a new Mexican National Women's Champion when previous champion Lady Apache won the higher ranked CMLL World Women's Championship. She was one of 14 women competing in a torneo cibernetico elimination match to qualify for the finals. The torneo cibernetico was won by Marcela and Princesa Sujei, eliminating La Nazi.

=== La Comandante (2009–present) ===
In late 2009 she started working under the ring name La Comandante (The Comandant), dropping the more controversial "La Nazi" name. CMLL began working closely with various Japanese female only wrestling promotions, including Universal Woman's Pro Wrestling Reina. Through her work in CMLL La Comandate was invited to wrestle in Japan, teaming up with fellow CMLL wrestler Zeuxis to compete in a tournament to crown the first ever Reina World Tag Team Champions. In the first round the team defeated Aki Kanbayashi and Saya in the first round and then defeated the team known as "the "Canadian NINJAs" (Nicole Matthews and Portia Perez) to become the first ever champions. The duo would hold the championship until December 6, 2011 when they lost the championship to the CMLL duo of Lluvia and Luna Mágica on a CMLL show in Mexico City. On May 13, 2012 La Comandate faced off against Yumiko Hotta in a Falls count anywhere match under Luchas de Apuestas rules which meant the loser would have her hair shaved off. The match was the main event of Reina 33, the first anniversary of the Japanese Universal Women's Pro Wrestling REINA promotion. La Comandante lost after 20 minutes of wrestling all over the arena and had her hair shaved off after the match.

==== Comando Caribeño ====
On May 9, 2013 CMLL introduced a new Comandante Pierroth, a character based on the original Pierroth . The new Comandante Pierroth was announced as the leader of a faction called El Comando Caribeño ("The Caribbean Commando") consisting of members of the original Pierroth's Los Boriquas, La Comandante, Pierrothito and Pequeño Violencia and added Puerto Rican Zeuxis to the group as well. On December 22, La Comandante returned to Japan and Reina Joshi Puroresu, losing to Syuri in a match for the vacant CMLL-Reina International Championship. During the tour, La Comandante also made several appearances for World Woman Pro-Wrestling Diana, where she most notably on January 4, 2014, turned on Kyoko Inoue to join former rival Yumiko Hotta's Bousou-gun stable. On June 29, La Comandante and Yumiko Hotta defeated Aki Shizuku and Ariya to win the Reina World Tag Team Championship. They lost the title to Ariya and Makoto on August 20.

== Championships and accomplishments ==
- Universal Woman's Pro Wrestling Reina / Reina Joshi Puroresu

- Reina World Tag Team Championship (2 times) – with Zeuxis (1) and Yumiko Hotta (1)
- Copa Bobby Bonales (2019)

== Luchas de Apuestas record ==
Winner (wager)	Loser (wager)	Location	Event	Date	Notes
Martha Villalobos (hair)	La Nazi (hair)	N/A	Live event	N/A	
La Nazi (hair)	Rudy Reyna (hair)	N/A	Live event	N/A	
Miss Janeth (hair)	La Nazi (hair)	N/A	Live event	N/A	
La Nazi (hair)	Chica de Arabia (hair)	N/A	Live event	N/A	
La Nazi (hair)	Estrella de Fuego (mask)	N/A	Live event	N/A	
La Briosa (hair)	La Nazi (hair)	Mexico City	Live event	January 27, 1999	
Yumiko Hotta (hair)	La Comandate (hair)	Tokyo, Japan	Live event	May 13, 2012	
