= Pantera Sureña =

Mexican female professional wrestler

Personal information
- Born: Lidia Hortencia Rangel Ávalos; December 29, 1955 (age 70)

Professional wrestling career
- Ring names: Pantera Sureña; La Galáctica; Lady Discovery; Lady Metal; La Galáctica 2000
- Billed height: 1.55 m (5 ft 1 in)
- Billed weight: 60 kg (132 lb)
- Debut: June 1969
- Retired: 2009

Lidia Hortencia Rangel Ávalos (born December 29, 1955) is a Mexican former professional wrestler, more commonly known under the ring name Pantera Sureña (Spanish for "Southern Panther"). She has also worked as the masked wrestling characters La Galáctica, La Galáctica 2000, Lady Discovery and Lady Metal during her career. Her career began in 1969 and stretched until 2008 where she worked her last match.

As Pantera Sureña, Rangel started her career as a masked wrestler, but lost her mask to Lola González in 1977. Her stints as La Galáctica, La Galáctica 2000, Lady Discovery and Lady Metal were all under a mask and only confirmed to be Rangel later in her career. In her almost 40-year career she has won the Distrito Federal Women's Championship, the UWA World Women's Championship, and the Mexican National Women's Tag Team Championship with Martha Villalobos in Mexico, as well as being the only female wrestler to win the WWWA World Singles Championship in Japan.

== Championships and accomplishments ==
- Empresa Mexicana de Lucha Libre / Consejo Mundial de Lucha Libre

- Distrito Federal Women's Championship (1 time)
- Mexican National Women's Tag Team Championship (1 time) – with Martha Villalobos

- Universal Wrestling Association

- UWA World Women's Championship (1 time)

- All Japan Women's Pro-Wrestling

- WWWA World Singles Championship (1 time)

== Luchas de Apuestas record ==
Winner (wager)	Loser (wager)	Location	Event	Date	Notes
Lola González (hair)	Pantera Sureña (mask)	Pachuca, Hidalgo	N/A	1977	
Martha Villalobos (hair)	Pantera Sureña (hair)	N/A	N/A	N/A	
Lady Apache (hair)	Pantera Sureña (hair)	N/A	N/A	N/A	
Rossy Moreno (hair)	Pantera Sureña (hair)	N/A	N/A	N/A	
Rossy Moreno (hair)	Pantera Sureña (hair)	N/A	N/A	N/A	
Tania (hair)	Pantera Sureña (hair)	N/A	N/A	N/A	
Estela Molina (hair)	Pantera Sureña (hair)	Naucalpan, State of Mexico	UWA show	March 31, 1979	
Vicky Williams (hair)	Pantera Sureña (hair)	Naucalpan, State of Mexico	UWA show	May 4, 1980	
Pantera Sureña (hair)	Rossy Moreno (hair)	Querétaro, Querétaro	N/A	January 11, 1983	
La Galáctica (mask)	Jaguar Yokota (hair)	Kawasaki, Japan	AJW show	May 7, 1983	
Pantera Sureña (hair)	Tania (hair)	Mexico City	CMLL show	March 18, 1988	
Pantera Sureña (hair)	Karla Ivonne (hair)	Mexico City	CMLL show	March 27, 1988	ref
Lola González (hair)	Pantera Sureña (hair)	Mexico City	CMLL show	December 9, 1988	
Zuleyma (hair)	Pantera Sureña (hair)	Mexico City	CMLL show	March 3, 1991	
Las Nasty Girls (Hair) (La Briosa and Neftaly)	Pantera Sureña and Wendy (hair)	Mexico City	N/A	November 12, 1993	
Lady Discovery (mask)	Princesa Guerrera (mask)	N/A	AAA show	March 19, 1999	(Note: Finals of a 12-woman Ruleta de la Muerte, loser advances, tournament.)
