= Princesa Sugehit =

Mexican female professional wrestler

Personal information
- Born: Ernestina Sugehit Salazar Martínez; June 25, 1980 (age 46) Monterrey, Nuevo León, Mexico

Professional wrestling career
- Ring names: Princesa Sugehit; Princesa Sugeth; Princesa Sugey; Princesa Sujei; Princesa Sujey
- Billed height: 1.55 m (5 ft 1 in)
- Billed weight: 55 kg (121 lb)
- Billed from: Monterrey, Mexico
- Trained by: Bello Kalifa; Centurión Negro; Carnicero Aguilar; Franco Columbo; El Hijo del Gladiador; José Luis Feliciano; El Satánico; Virus
- Debut: 1995

Ernestina Sugehit Salazar Martínez (born June 25, 1980) is a Mexican professional wrestler who is best known under the ring name Princesa Sugehit. She is working for the Mexican promotion Consejo Mundial de Lucha Libre (CMLL) portraying a ruda/heel ("bad guy") wrestling character. Her name has appeared differently in different publications, even her employer CMLL has not always spelled her name consistently, it has appeared as Princesa Sujei, Princesa Sugey, Princesa Sujey, Princesa Sugeth, Princesa Sugehit and variations thereof.

== Early life ==
Salazar was a fan of professional wrestling from a young age and was one of the first people to show up when a new wrestling school opened in her native Monterrey, Nuevo León. She was the only female in the wrestling school, which meant that the diminutive woman (1.55 m (5 ft 1 in)) had to wrestle against men as she was taught to wrestle by Bello Kalifa, Centurión Negro, and Carnicero Aguilar.

== Professional wrestling career ==
=== Early career (1996–2005) ===
The butterfly design on her wrestling mask came from one of her trainers who said she would fly high like a monarch butterfly. She decided on the name "Princesa Sujei" with "Sujei" being the name of a queen of the stars. She made her professional wrestling debut on September 22, 1996, in Arena La Junta teaming up with Flor de Loto to face off against Reina Salvaje and La Intrusa in a tag team match. In the years following her debut Princesa Sujei worked primarily for Lucha Libre AAA World Wide (AAA), one of Mexico's largest wrestling promotions. In 1999 Princesa Sujei participated in AAA's first ever Reina de Reinas ("Queen of Queens") tournament, losing to Miss Janeth in the qualifying round. On November 23, 2001, Princesa Sujei teamed up with Esther Moreno and Estrellita to defeat Martha Villalobos, Mujer Demente, and Tiffany on the undercard of the 2001 Guerra de Titanes event. Princesa Sujei also worked for Lucha Libre Feminil, a local promotion in her hometown of Monterrey where she held the LLF Extreme Championship, the LLF Juvenil Championship and the LLF Tag Team Championship along with Poly Star. While in LLF, she developed a rivalry with Canadian wrestler Dark Angel throughout 2004, which led to a forty-five long minute Luchas de Apuestas ("Bet Match") between the two, which saw Princesa Sujei pin Dark Angel, forcing her to unmask afterward. She also participated in the All Pro Wrestling-promoted "ChickFight" tournament, defeating Candice LeRae in the first round, Nikki Roxx in the second round and Cheerleader Melissa in the finals to win the first ChickFight tournament. In 2005, she participated in that year's Reina de Reinas tournament alongside Lady Apache, Tiffany, Cynthia Moreno, Dark Angel, Estrellita, Faby Apache, Golden Girl, La Chola, Martha Villalobos, Nikki Roxx, Poly Star, Princesa Blanca, Simply Luscious, and Veronica in a torneo cibernetico elimination match but was eliminated early in the match. She later participated in the "ChickFight II" tournament, defeating Luscious in the first round, but losing to Mariko Yoshida in the second round.

=== Consejo Mundial de Lucha Libre (2005–present) ===
In early 2005, Consejo Mundial de Lucha Libre (CMLL) decided to renew their female's division after several years of low activity, adding a number of wrestlers to their roster including Princesa Sujei. On April 27, 2007, she competed to in a tournament to crown a new Mexican National Women's Champion when previous champion Lady Apache won the higher ranked CMLL World Women's Championship. Princesa Blanca was one of 14 women competing in a torneo cibernetico to qualify for the finals. The torneo cibernetico was won by Princesa Sujei and Marcela. The two faced off a week later with Marcela winning the match and the championship Princesa Sujei developed a storyline rivalry with tecnica ("Good guy") Goddess, a strong rivalry that built to Luchas de Apuestas, mask vs. mask match between the two in October 2008. The Apuestas match is the most prestigious "prize" in Lucha Libre, even more than a championship match, a prize that Princesa Sujei claimed when she pinned Goddess and forced her to unmask. She was given several opportunities to travel to Japan and work for several Japanese wrestling promotions through her CMLL contacts. One such chance came in March 2010 when she appeared on the final Fuka Matsuri event on March 28, 2010, where Sujei and Hiroka lost to promotion owner Tigre Fuka and Leon. On June 14, 2010, Princesa Sujei defeated Lady Apache to win the PWR World Women's Champion on a CMLL promoted show in Puebla, Puebla. Sujei held the championship for over a year, 454 days in total, before losing the championship back to Lady Apache. Over the years Princesa Blanca developed a professional relationship with Princesa Sujei and Hiroka, creating a group known as Las Zorras ("The Foxes") and when Hiroka retired the two Princesas became known as Las Ladies de Polanco, The ladies of Polanco, an affluent neighborhood in Mexico City. In June 2012 Los Ladies traveled to Japan to compete in a tournament for the vacant Reina World Tag Team Championship, losing in the first round to eventual tournament winners "Muscle Venus" (Hikaru Shida and Tsukasa Fujimoto). On April 28, 2015, Sujei defeated Narumiya to win the CMLL-Reina International Championship. She lost the title back to Narumiya in a rematch in Tokyo on May 17. On February 25, 2017, Princesa Sujei defeated longtime rival Zeuxis to win the Mexican National Women's Championship. On September 16, 2017, at the annual CMLL 84th Anniversary Show, Sugehit lost her mask in a lucha de apuestas two out of three falls against Zeuxis, revealing herself as Ernestina Sugehit Salazar Martinez with 21 years experience in the sport.

On September 16, 2020, Sugehit announced that he would not be able to wrestler to CMLL 87th Anniversary Show after testing positive for COVID-19. On October 23, Sugehit defeated Marcela in a Two-out-of-three falls match to win the World Women's Championship. On August 16, 2023, Sugehit was forced to relinquished her title after sustaining an injury, ending her reign at 1,027 days.

=== WWE (2017) ===
On June 16, 2017, WWE announced Sugehit as part of the Mae Young Classic. On August 28, Sugehit defeated Kay Lee Ray in the first round. On September 4, Sugehit was eliminated in the second round by Mercedes Martinez.

== Championships and accomplishments ==
- ChickFight
  - ChickFight I
- Consejo Mundial de Lucha Libre
  - CMLL-Reina International Championship (1 time)
  - CMLL World Women's Championship (1 time)
  - Mexican National Women's Championship (1 time)
  - Copa Femenil (2016)
  - Copa Natalia Vázquez (2017)
  - Copa Irma González (2023)
  - Copa Mujeres Revolucionarias (2026)
  - Torneo Increible De Amazonas (2021) - with Dalys la Caribeña
  - Copa Bobby Bonales (2021)
- Lucha Libre Feminil
  - LLF Extreme Championship (1 time)
  - LLF Juvenil Championship (1 time)
  - LLF Tag Team Championship (1 time) – with Polly Star
- Pro Wrestling Illustrated
  - Ranked No. 32 of the top 150 female singles wrestlers in the PWI Women's 150 in 2022
- Pro Wrestling Revolution
  - PWR World Women's Championship (1 time)

== Luchas de Apuestas record ==
Winner (wager)	Loser (wager)	Location	Event	Date	Notes
Princesa Sujei (mask)	Pantera Salvaje (mask)	N/A	Live event	N/A	
Princesa Sujei (mask)	Dark Angel (mask)	Monterrey, Nuevo León	Live event	April 2, 2004	
Princesa Sujei (mask)	Goddess (mask)	N/A	Live event	October 7, 2008	
Marcela (hair) and Princesa Sujei (mask)	Princesa Blanca (hair) and La Seductora (mask)	Mexico City	El Juicio Final	August 1, 2014	
Zeuxis (mask)	Princesa Sugehit (mask)	Mexico City	CMLL 84th Anniversary Show	September 16, 2017	
Princesa Sugehit (hair)	La Seductora (hair)	Mexico City	62.Aniversario de Arena México	April 27, 2018	
Marcela (hair)	Princesa Sugehit (hair)	Mexico City	Homenaje a Dos Leyendas (2026)	March 20, 2026	
