= Neftaly =

Mexican female professional wrestler

Personal information
- Born: Maricela Neftaly Gallegos Gonzalez; November 5, 1970 (age 55) Mexico City, Mexico
- Children: 1
- Family: Reyna Gallegos (sister); El Gallego (brother); El Galgo (brother)
- Website: Facebook

Professional wrestling career
- Ring names: Neftali; Neftaly
- Debut: May 29, 1987

Maricela Neftaly Gallegos Gonzalez (born November 5, 1970) is a Mexican former professional wrestler, known under the ring name Neftaly, sometimes spelled Neftali. Over the years, Neftaly worked for Consejo Mundial de Lucha Libre, Universal Wrestling Association and AAA in Mexico and for Frontier Martial-Arts Wrestling, JDStar, W*ING and Big Japan Pro Wrestling in Japan.

Neftaly formed a trios team, Las Nasty Girls, with La Briosa and La Monstra. Neftaly and La Briosa won the Mexican National Women's Tag Team Championship ganandoselo a Vicky Carranza y Larossa y lo pierden ante La Sirenita y Larossa in 1996 and held it for 653 days. She also held the Mexican National Women's Championship in the early 1990s, losing it to La Sirenita in 1992. ganó las cabelleras de Pantera Sureña y Wendy junto a La Briosa She retired in 1998.

She is the sister of professional wrestlers Reyna Gallegos, El Gallego and El Galgo. and is currently married to The Winger (Takashi Okano).

== Championships and accomplishments ==
- Empresa Mexicana de Lucha Libre
  - Mexican National Women's Championship (1 time)
  - Mexican National Women's Tag Team Championship (1 time) – with La Briosa

== Luchas de Apuestas record ==
Winner (wager)	Loser (wager)	Location	Event	Date	Notes
Las Nasty Girls (hair) (La Briosa and Neftaly)	Pantera Sureña and Wendy (hair)	Mexico City	AAA Show	November 12, 1993	
