= Neftali =

Neftali is a given name. Notable people with the name include:

- Neftalí Díaz (born 1971), Panamanian football player
- Neftalí Feliz (born 1988), Dominican right-handed pitcher for the Pittsburgh Pirates of Major League Baseball
- Neftalí Garzón Contreras (born 1948), Mexican politician from the Party of the Democratic Revolution
- Neftalí Luna (born 1979), Spanish football player
- Neftali Manzambi (born 1997), Swiss football player
- Jonatan Neftalí (born 1984), Spanish football player
- Ricardo Elecier Neftalí Reyes Basoalto, known as Pablo Neruda (1904–1973), Chilean poet-diplomat and politician
- Neftalí Rivera (1948–2017), Puerto Rican basketball player
- Neftalí Soto, farmer, attorney and former Secretary of Agriculture of Puerto Rico
- Neftalí Soto (baseball) (born 1989), Puerto Rican professional baseball player
- Neftalí Ayungua Suárez (born 1936), Mexican potter from Patamban, Michoacán, named a "grand master" of Mexican folk art

== See also ==
- Naphtali, a Biblical son of Jacob
  - Naphtali (name)
