= Vicky Carranza =

Mexican female professional wrestler

Personal information
- Born: May 19, 1959 (age 66) San Miguel de Allende, Guanajuato, Mexico
- Spouse: Convoy (husband)
- Children: Ricky (son)
- Parent: Carraza I (father)

Professional wrestling career
- Ring name: Vicky Carranza
- Debut: 1974

Angelica Hernandez (born May 19, 1959) is a Mexican former professional wrestler best known under the ring name Vicky Carranza. She is the daughter of professional wrestler Carraza I, the husband of retired wrestler Convoy. Carranza and Convoy have a son that have followed in their footsteps and also become a wrestler, known as Ricky.

During her career, Carranza won the Mexican National Women's Championship twice, as well as the Mexican National Women's Tag Team Championship with La Briosa.

== Championships and accomplishments ==
- Consejo Mundial de Lucha Libre
  - Mexican National Women's Championship (2 times)
  - Mexican National Women's Tag Team Championship (1 time) with La Briosa
