= La Briosa =

Mexican female professional wrestler

Personal information
- Spouse: El Mexicano (husband)
- Children: Halcon 78 Jr. (son); Hammer Fist (son); Combat (son)
- Parent: Sugi Sito (father)
- Relatives: Huroki Sito (uncle); Panchito Robles (uncle); Manuel Robles (uncle); Pánico (cousin); El Jabato (cousin); Black Cat (cousin)

Professional wrestling career
- Ring name: La Briosa
- Debut: Mid-1970s

La Briosa (Spanish for The Verve One) is the ring name of a semi-retired Mexican professional wrestler who was primarily active from the mid-1970s until 2000. She is a second-generation wrestler, daughter of Sugi Sito, and together with her husband, a wrestler known under the names El Mexicano and Halcón 78. Together they have three sons that have followed in their footsteps and also become professional wrestlers, known as Halcón 78 Jr., Hammer Fist and Combat. La Briosa is the cousin of wrestlers Pánico, El Jabato, and Black Cat, and the aunt of Skándalo, Stigma and Rayo Metálico. She has only worked a small number of matches since 2000.

During her career, La Briosa won the Mexican National Women's Championship on one occasion, and was the only wrestler to win the Mexican National Women's Tag Team Championship twice, first with Vicky Carranza and later on with Neftali. She worked as an masked professional wrestler for most of her career, but lost it to Martha Villalobos 1992. La Briosa formed a trios team with Neftali, and La Monstra known as Las Nasty Girls.

== Championships and accomplishments ==
- Empresa Mexicana de Lucha Libre'

- Mexican National Women's Championship (1 time)
- Mexican National Women's Tag Team Championship (2 times) – with Vicky Carranza and Neftali

== Luchas de Apuestas record ==
| Winner (wager) | Loser (wager) | Location | Event | Date | Notes |
|---|---|---|---|---|---|
| La Briosa (mask) | La Bruja (mask) | N/A | UWA Show | N/A | |
| La Briosa (mask) | La Medusa (mask) | N/A | UWA Show | May 27, 1979 | |
| La Briosa (mask) | La Hiena (mask) | Cuernavaca, Morelos | UWA Show | July 29, 1983 | |
| La Briosa (mask) | La Hiena (mask) | León, Guanajuato | UWA Show | August 1, 1983 | |
| Martha Villalobos (hair) | La Briosa (mask) | Acapulco, Guerrero | AAA Show | September 18, 1992 | |
| Martha Villalobos (hair) | La Briosa (hair) | Mexico City | AAA Show | February 19, 1993 | |
| Las Nasty Girls (hair) (La Briosa and Neftaly) | Pantera Sureña and Wendy (hair) | Mexico City | AAA Show | November 12, 1993 | |
| La Briosa (hair) | La Nazi (hair) | Ecatepec de Morelos, State of Mexico | Independent show | January 27, 1999 | |
