= Martha Villalobos =

Mexican female professional wrestler

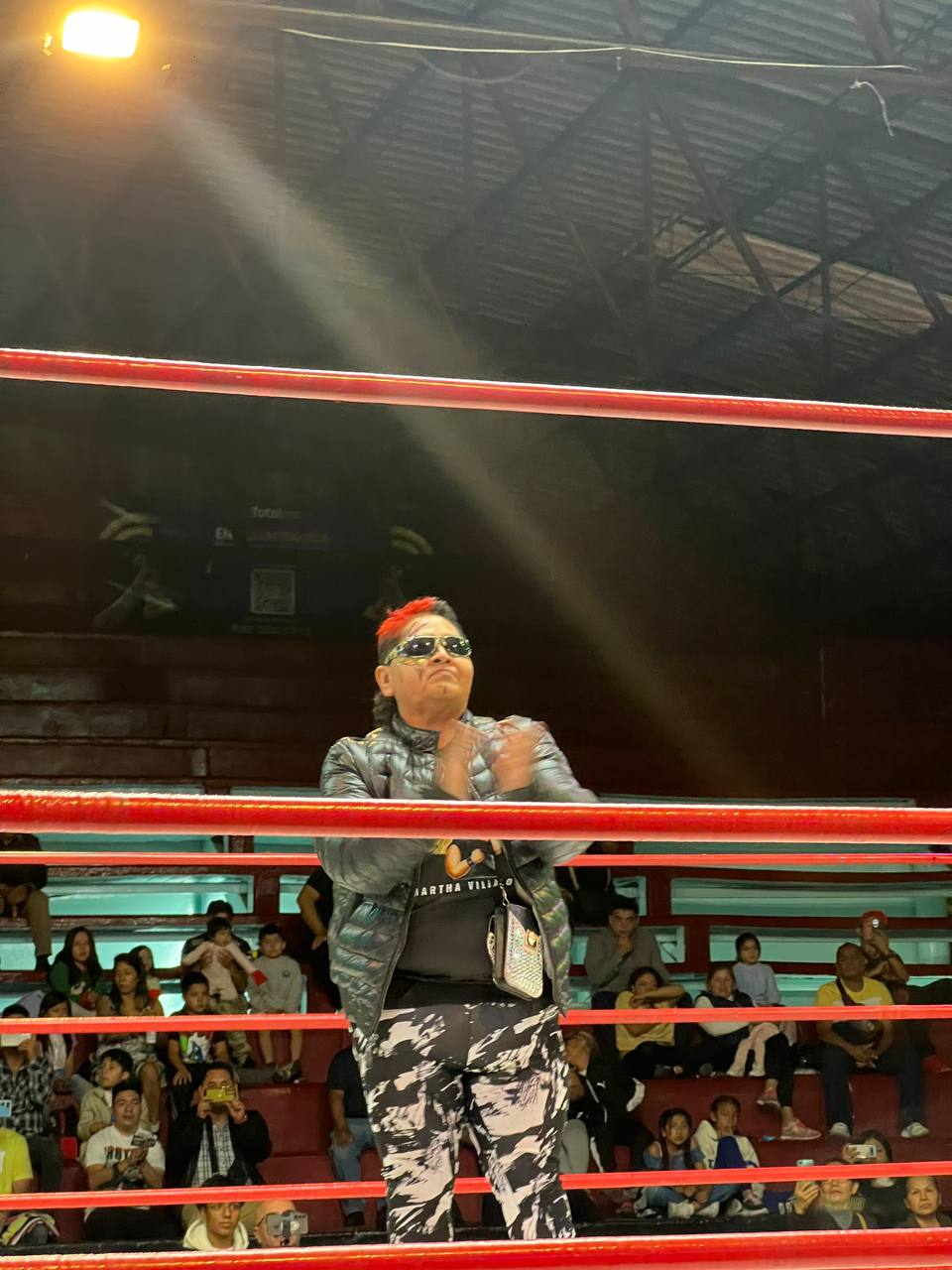

Personal information
- Born: Martha García Mejía; May 30, 1962 (age 64) Distrito Federal, Mexico
- Parent: Panchito Villalobos (father)
- Family: Johnny Villalobos (brother); Bobby Villalobos (brother)

Professional wrestling career
- Ring names: Martha Villalobos; La Muerte de la Barranca
- Billed height: 152 cm (5 ft 0 in)
- Billed weight: 104 kg (229 lb)
- Trained by: Panchito Villalobos; El Enfermero
- Debut: September 9, 1979
- Retired: 2011

Martha García Mejía (born May 30, 1962) is a Mexican former professional wrestler best known under the ring name Martha Villalobos an active wrestling promoter, running a company named Reyes del Ring ("Kings of the Ring"). She is the daughter of professional wrestler Panchito Villalobos and the sister of retired wrestlers Johnny and Bobby Villalobos. She is a former two-time Mexican National Women's Champion as well as holding the Mexican National Women's Tag Team Championship with Pantera Sureña while working for Consejo Mundial de Lucha Libre (CMLL). While working for AAA she won the AAA Reina de Reinas Championship twice, first by defeating Reina de Reina Esther Moreno and later by winning the 2003 tournament.

== Championships and accomplishments ==
- AAA

- AAA Reina de Reinas Championship (2 times)

- Comision de Box y Lucha D.F.

- Mexican National Women's Championship (2 times)
- Mexican National Women's Tag Team Championship (1 time) – with Pantera Sureña

- Federacion Internacional de Lucha Libre

- FILL Women's Championship (1 time)

- Independent circuit|Local championship

- Northern Mexico Women's Championship (1 time)
- Mexico State Women's Championship (1 time)

== Lucha de Apuesta record ==
| Winner (wager) | Loser (wager) | Location | Event | Date | Notes |
|---|---|---|---|---|---|
| Martha Villalobos (hair) | Pantera Sureña (hair) | N/A | Live event | N/A | |
| Martha Villalobos (hair) | Demoladora (hair) | N/A | Live event | N/A | |
| Martha Villalobos (hair) | La Sirenita (hair) | N/A | Live event | N/A | |
| Martha Villalobos (hair) | La Nazi (hair) | N/A | Live event | N/A | |
| Martha Villalobos (hair) | La Hechicera (hair) | N/A | Live event | N/A | |
| Martha Villalobos (hair) | Catwoman (hair) | N/A | Live event | N/A | |
| Martha Villalobos (hair) | Karla Ivon (hair) | N/A | Live event | N/A | |
| Martha Villalobos (hair) | Wanda Star (mask) | N/A | Live event | N/A | |
| Martha Villalobos (hair) | Lacandona (mask) | N/A | Live event | N/A | |
| Martha Villalobos (hair) | La Esmaralda (hair) | Tlalnepantla de Baz, State of Mexico | Live event | June 12, 1983 | |
| Irma Aguilar (hair) | Martha Villalobos (hair) | Mexico City | Live event | August 18, 1989 | |
| Martha Villalobos (hair) | Rossy Moreno (hair) | Mexico City | Live event | June 1, 1990 | |
| Martha Villalobos (hair) | La Briosa (hair) | Acapulco, Guerrero | Live event | September 8, 1992 | |
| Martha Villalobos (hair) | La Briosa (hair) | Mexico City | Live event | February 19, 1993 | |
| La Sirenita (hair) | Martha Villalobos (hair) | Mexico City | Live event | December 1, 1995 | |
| Martha Villalobos (hair) | Samantha (mask) | Nuevo Laredo, Mexico | Live event | March 7, 1999 | |
