= India Sioux =

Mexican professional wrestler (born 1984)

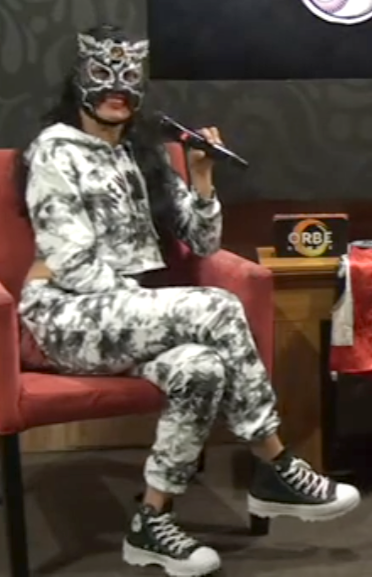
- In a 2023 interview

Personal information
- Born: 20 September 1984 (age 41) Nezahualcóyotl, Mexico

Professional wrestling career
- Ring name: India Sioux
- Billed height: 1.61 m (5 ft 3 1/2 in)
- Billed weight: 53 kg (117 lb)
- Trained by: Puma; La Marquesa; José Luis Feliciano; Hombre Bala
- Debut: April 2004

India Sioux (born 20 September 1984) is the ring name of a Mexican professional wrestler. She is working for Mexican promotion Consejo Mundial de Lucha Libre (CMLL) as a tecnica (those that portray the "good guys" in professional wrestling) and is the reigning CMLL Japanese Women's Champion and Mexican National Women's Champion. Her real name is not a matter of public record as is often the case with masked wrestlers in Mexico.

== Professional wrestling career ==
On 7 March 2025, Sioux defeated Sanely to win the Mexican National Women's Championship.

== Personal life ==
Sioux was married to professional wrestler Máximo and together they have two children. She also comes from a wrestling family, including her father Hombre Bala, her mother India Sioux, her brothers Hombre Bala Jr. and Corsario Jr., and her uncles Pirata Morgan, Verdugo and La Marquesa. She is a cousin of Pirata Morgan Jr., El Hijo de Pirata Morgan, Barba Roja, Perla Negra and Rey Bucanero.

== Championships and accomplishments ==
- Consejo Mundial de Lucha Libre

- CMLL Japanese Women's Championship (1 time, current)
- Mexican National Women's Championship (1 time)
- CMLL Universal Amazons Championship (2025)
