= AAA Reina de Reinas Championship =

Professional wrestling championship

- The current championship belt

Details
- Promotion: Lucha Libre AAA Worldwide
- Date established: February 19, 1999
- Current champion: La Catalina
- Date won: September 13, 2026
Statistics
- First champion: Xóchitl Hamada
- Most reigns: 4 reigns: Faby Apache; Taya Valkyrie
- Longest reign: Flammer (1,128 days)
- Shortest reign: Ayako Hamada (33 days)
- Oldest champion: Pimpinela Escarlata (42 years, 104 days)
- Youngest champion: Keyra (23 years, 233 days)

The AAA Reina de Reinas Championship (Spanish for "AAA Queen of Queens Championship"), also known as the AAA Women's Championship, is a women's professional wrestling championship promoted by the Mexican promotion Lucha Libre AAA Worldwide (AAA), a subsidiary of the American promotion WWE. The current champion is La Catalina, who is in her first reign. She won the title by defeating Flammer on Night 2 of Triplemanía 34 on September 13, 2026.

The inaugural champion was Xóchitl Hamada, who was crowned after winning the original Reina de Reinas tournament in 1999. From its creation in 1999 to 2009, the title was put on the line every year during the eponymous "Reina de Reinas" tournament, in addition to traditional defenses. The tournament eventually returned in 2012, with Sexy Star becoming the first wrestler to successfully retain the title at the event. Although the title is exclusive to the women's division, Pimpinela Escarlata—a popular exótico wrestler—won it in 2011.

== History ==
On February 19, 1999, Xóchitl Hamada became the inaugural champion after defeating Esther Moreno, Miss Janeth and Rossy Moreno in a four-way match. On February 20, 2000, the championship was vacated after the previous titleholder Esther Moreno suffered an injury. Rossy Moreno won the vacant championship on the same date by defeating Hamada, Janeth and Martha Villalobos in a four-way match. On July 31, 2011, at Verano de Escándalo, Pimpinela Escarlata became the first man to hold the title in the championship's history, which was legitimized as Escarlata being a Exótico. On February 19, 2013, the championship was vacated as the previous champion Sexy Star vacated the tile due to her pregnancy. On March 17, at Rey de Reyes, Faby Apache won the vacant title by defeating LuFisto, Mari Apache and Taya in a four-way elimination match.

On July 1, 2017, the director of talent Vampiro stripped Taya from the title, who was in her second reign. In kayfabe, Vampiro explained due to Taya using an illegal chokehold on Ayako Hamada, which Taya defeated to win the title on April 21, the championship was vacated, despite the match being a no disqualification match. However, the real reason for the vacancy is still in question, as it was reported that AAA requested from Taya's fiancé Johnny Mundo to turn the title for photoshoot, which was later declared vacated. This led to Taya publicly quitting the company. On July 16, Star won the vacant title after defeating Big Mami, Faby Apache, Goya Kong, La Hiedra and Lady Shani in a six-way match.

On August 26, at Triplemanía XXV, Star successfully defended her title against Hamada, Rosemary and Shani in a four-way. During the match, Star legitimately injured Rosemary after applying an armbar. On September 4, due to violation of the promotion's rules, Star's victory in the championship match was overturned as a result of the incident, leading to the title being vacated. On October 1, at Héroes Inmortales XI, Shani defeated Hamada to win the vacant championship. On August 3, 2019, at Triplemanía XXVII, the title was vacated once again after the last champion Keyra suffered an injury. Tessa Blanchard won the vacant championship that same day after winning a seven-woman Tables, ladders, and chairs match.

On September 15, 2019, Taya Valkyrie (previously known simply as Taya), who made her return to the company in 2018, defeated Blanchard to win the title for the third time, during the Lucha Invades NY event. On February 24, 2021, the title was vacated for the fifth time after Valkyrie signed with WWE. On May 1, at Rey de Reyes, Faby Apache won the vacated championship. On December 4, at Triplemanía Regia II, Valkyrie made her return to the company. On April 23, 2022, at Impact Wrestling's Rebellion, Valkyrie defeated Deonna Purrazzo to win the title for the fourth time in her career.

== Reigns ==
As of November 7, 2026, there have been 32 reigns between 19 champions and 5 vacancies. Xóchitl Hamada was the inaugural champion. Faby Apache and Taya Valkyrie are tied for the most reigns at four, while they along with Tiffany and Sexy Star have won the Reina de Reinas tournaments the most times at three. Flammer has held the title the longest at 1,128 days, while Ayako Hamada's reign has the shortest reign at 33 days. Pimpinela Escarlata is the oldest champion at 42 years old, while Keyra is the youngest at 23 years old.

La Catalina is the current champion in her first reign. She won the title by defeating Flammer on Night 2 of Triplemanía 34 on September 13, 2026, in Azcapotzalco, Mexico City, Mexico.

Key
No.	Overall reign number
Reign	Reign number for the specific champion
Days	Number of days held
Days recog.	Number of days held recognized by the promotion
+	Current reign is changing daily

No.	Champion	Championship change			Reign statistics			Notes	Ref.
No.	Champion	Date	Event	Location	Reign	Days	Days recog.	Notes	Ref.
Lucha Libre AAA Worldwide (AAA)
1	Xóchitl Hamada	February 19, 1999	Reina de Reinas	Puebla, Puebla, Mexico	1	229	229	Defeated Esther Moreno, Miss Janeth, and Rossy Moreno in the four-way tournament final to become the inaugural champion.	
2	Esther Moreno	October 6, 1999	AAA	San Luis Potosí, San Luis Potosí, Mexico	1	137	137		
—	Vacated	February 20, 2000	—	—	—	—	—	Esther Moreno sustained an injury.	
3	Rossy Moreno	February 20, 2000	Reina de Reinas	Morelia, Michoacán, Mexico	1	363	363	Defeated Martha Villalobos, Miss Janeth, and Xóchitl Hamada in the four-way tournament final to win the vacant title.	
4	Lady Apache	February 17, 2001	Sin Limite: Reina de Reinas	Veracruz, Veracruz, Mexico	1	371	363	Defeated Alda Moreno, Miss Janeth, and Tiffany in the four-way tournament final. Aired on February 25.	
5	Esther Moreno	February 23, 2002	AAA	Veracruz, Veracruz, Mexico	2	70	70	Defeated previous champion Lady Apache, Martha Villalobos, and Miss Janeth in the four-way tournament final.	
6	Martha Villalobos	May 4, 2002	AAA	Reynosa, Tamaulipas, Mexico	1	295	295		
7	Tiffany	February 23, 2003	Reina de Reinas	N/A	1	343	371	Defeated Lady Apache in the tournament final.	
8	Lady Apache	February 1, 2004	Sin Limite	Zapopan, Jalisco, Mexico	2	385	364	Aired February 29.	
9	Tiffany	February 20, 2005	Sin Limite	Mexico City, Mexico	2	363	364	Defeated previous champion Lady Apache in the tournament final. Aired February 27.	
10	Miss Janeth	February 18, 2006	Sin Limite: Reina de Reinas	Orizaba, Veracruz, Mexico	1	400	406	Defeated Cynthia Moreno, La Diabólica, and Martha Villalobos in the four-way elimination tournament final. Aired February 26.	
11	Tiffany	March 25, 2007	Sin Limite: Reina de Reinas	Tula de Allende, Hidalgo, Mexico	3	430	420	Defeated previous champion Miss Janeth, Cynthia Moreno, Faby Apache, Rossy Moreno, and Sexy Star in the battle royal tournament final. Aired April 8.	
12	Faby Apache	May 28, 2008	Sin Limite: Reina de Reinas	Morelia, Michoacán, Mexico	1	486	482	Defeated Ayako Hamada and Mari Apache in the three-way tournament final. Aired on June 1.	
13	Sexy Star	September 26, 2009	Héroes Inmortales III	Monterrey, Nuevo León, Mexico	1	322	330	This was a Bull Terrier match.	
14	Mari Apache	August 14, 2010	Verano de Escándalo	Orizaba, Veracruz, Mexico	1	351	357	Mari Apache, Faby Apache, and Aero Star defeated previous champion Sexy Star and defending AAA World Mixed Tag Team Champions Christina Von Eerie and Alex Koslov in a six-person mixed tag team match for either the Reina de Reinas Championship or the World Mixed Tag Team Championship. Since Mari pinned Star, she won the Reina de Reinas title, while Koslov and Eerie retained their titles. Aired on August 22.	
15	Pimpinela Escarlata	July 31, 2011	Verano de Escándalo	Guadalajara, Jalisco, Mexico	1	138	124	This eight-way elimination match also featured Cynthia Moreno, Faby Apache, Jennifer Blake, Lolita, Mickie James, and Sexy Star. Escarlata, whose character is an Exotico, became the first man to win the title. Aired on August 14.	
16	Sexy Star	December 16, 2011	Guerra de Titanes	Puebla, Puebla, Mexico	2	431	431	This was a lumberjack match.	
—	Vacated	February 19, 2013	—	—	—	—	—	Sexy Star announced her pregnancy.	
17	Faby Apache	March 17, 2013	Rey de Reyes	Monterrey, Nuevo León, Mexico	2	518	500	Defeated LuFisto, Mari Apache, and Taya in the four-way elimination tournament final to win the vacant title. Aired on April 4.	
18	Taya	August 17, 2014	Triplemanía XXII	Mexico City, Mexico	1	945	945		
19	Ayako Hamada	March 19, 2017	Rey de Reyes	Monterrey, Nuevo León, Mexico	1	33	33		
20	Taya	April 21, 2017	AAA	Tijuana, Baja California, Mexico	2	71	71	This was a no disqualification match.	
—	Vacated	July 1, 2017	—	—	—	—	—	Director of Talent Vampiro stripped Taya of the title for unknown reasons. In kayfabe, Taya used an illegal chokehold during her no disqualification match with Ayako Hamada.	
21	Sexy Star	July 16, 2017	AAA	Monterrey, Nuevo León, Mexico	3	50	50	Defeated Big Mami, Faby Apache, Goya Kong, La Hiedra, and Lady Shani in a six-way match to win the vacant title.	
—	Vacated	September 4, 2017	—	—	—	—	—	Sexy Star was stripped of the title after violating AAA's rules when she legitimately injured Rosemary after retaining the title at Triplemanía XXV.	
22	Lady Shani	October 1, 2017	Héroes Inmortales XI	San Luis Potosí, San Luis Potosí, Mexico	1	117	117	Defeated Ayako Hamada to win the vacant title.	
23	Faby Apache	January 26, 2018	Guerra de Titanes	Mexico City, Mexico	3	310	310		
24	Lady Shani	December 2, 2018	Guerra de Titanes	Aguascalientes, Aguascalientes, Mexico	2	196	196	This four-way match also featured La Hiedra and Scarlett Bordeaux.	
25	Keyra	June 16, 2019	Verano de Escándalo	Mérida, Yucatán, Mexico	1	48	48	This three-way match also featured Chik Tormenta.	
—	Vacated	August 3, 2019	Triplemanía XXVII	Mexico City, Mexico	—	—	—	Keyra sustained an injury.	
26	Tessa Blanchard	August 3, 2019	Triplemanía XXVII	Mexico City, Mexico	1	43	43	Defeated Ayako Hamada, Chik Tormenta, Faby Apache, La Hiedra, Lady Shani, and Taya in a Tables, Ladders, and Chairs match to win the vacant title.	
27	Taya Valkyrie	September 15, 2019	Lucha Invades NY	New York, New York, U.S.	3	528	528	Valkyrie was previously known as Taya.	
—	Vacated	February 24, 2021	—	—	—	—	—	Taya Valkyrie signed with WWE.	
28	Faby Apache	May 1, 2021	Rey de Reyes	San Pedro Cholula, Puebla, Mexico	4	105	105	Defeated Lady Shani, Lady Flammer, Chik Tormenta, Lady Maravilla, and Sexy Star II to win the vacant title.	
29	Deonna Purrazzo	August 14, 2021	Triplemanía XXIX	Mexico City, Mexico	1	252	252	This Winner Takes All match was also for the Impact Knockouts Championship.	
30	Taya Valkyrie	April 23, 2022	Impact Wrestling Rebellion	Poughkeepsie, New York, U.S.	4	476	476	This was an Impact Wrestling event.	
31	Flammer	August 12, 2023	Triplemanía XXXI: Mexico City	Azcapotzalco, Mexico City, Mexico	1	1,128	1,128	This was a no disqualification match.	
32	La Catalina	September 13, 2026	Triplemanía 34; Night 2	Azcapotzalco, Mexico City, Mexico	1	55+	55+		

== Combined reigns ==
As of November 7, 2026.

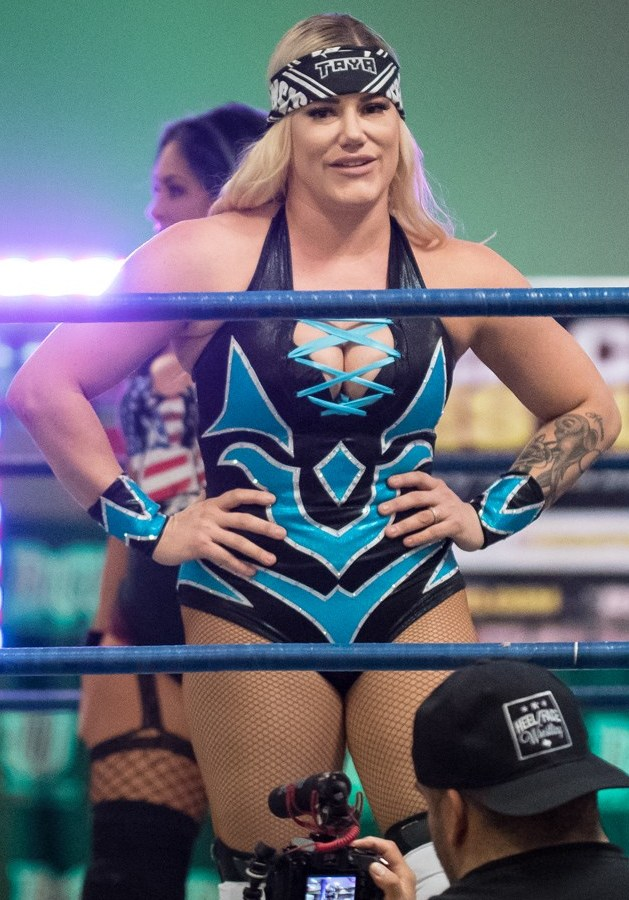
Taya Valkyrie tied for the most reigns at 4 and set the record for most combined days at 2,020.

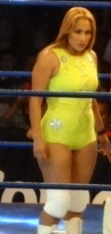
Faby Apache tied for most reigns at 4.

†	Current champion; reign changing daily

Rank	Champion	No. of reigns	Combined days	
Rank	Champion	No. of reigns	Actual	Recognized by AAA
1	Taya/Taya Valkyrie	4	2,020	
2	Faby Apache	4	1,419	1,397
3	Tiffany	3	1,136	1,155
4	Flammer	1	1,128	
5	Sexy Star	3	803	811
6	Lady Apache	2	756	727
7	Miss Janeth	1	400	406
8	Rossy Moreno	1	363	
9	Mari Apache	1	351	357
10	Lady Shani	2	313	
11	Martha Villalobos	1	295	
12	Deonna Purrazzo	1	252	
13	Xóchitl Hamada	1	229	
14	Esther Moreno	2	207	
15	Pimpinela Escarlata	1	138	124
16	La Catalina †	1	55+	
17	Keyra	1	48	
18	Tessa Blanchard	1	43	
19	Ayako Hamada	1	33	

== See also ==
- List of current champions in Lucha Libre AAA Worldwide
- World Women's Championship (disambiguation)
- Women's championships in WWE
