= Reyna Gallegos =

Mexican female professional wrestler

Personal information
- Relatives: Neftali (sister); El Gallego (brother); El Galgo (brother)

Professional wrestling career
- Ring name: Reyna Gallegos
- Trained by: El Enfermero
- Debut: 1980

Reyna Gallegos is a Mexican former professional wrestler who was active from 1980 through the late 1990s.

When women's professional wrestling was allowed in Mexico City, after a 30-year ban, she was the first holder of the Mexican National Women's Championship to be sanctioned by the Mexico City Boxing and Wrestling Commission. She initially retired in 1988 because she was pregnant, but returned in the early 1990s after the death of her husband. Over the years, she worked primarily for the Universal Wrestling Association (UWA) and later on for AAA.

== Championships and accomplishments ==
- Empresa Mexicana de Lucha Libre'

- Mexican National Women's Championship (1 time

== Luchas de Apuestas record ==
Winner (wager)	Loser (wager)	Location	Event	Date	Notes
Reyna Gallegos (hair)	La Emurai (hair)	Puebla, Puebla	N/A	1981	
