= La Sirenita =

Mexican female professional wrestler

Personal information
- Born: Guadalupe Buye Peña; March 17, 1962 (age 64) Matamoros, Tamaulipas, Mexico
- Spouse: Crazy 33 (ex-husband)
- Children: Enigma (son)

Professional wrestling career
- Billed height: 160 cm (5 ft 3 in)
- Billed weight: 62 kg (137 lb)
- Trained by: René Guajardo
- Debut: September 9, 1976

Guadalupe Buye Peña (born March 17, 1962) is a Mexican former professional wrestler who was primarily active from 1976 until 1996. She worked under the ring name La Sirenita, Spanish for "Little Mermaid". She was once married to a professional wrestler known as "Crazy 33" and together they have a son that also became a professional wrestler under the name Enigma.

During her career, Buye won several championships, including the Distrito Federal Women's Championship, the Mexican National Women's Championship on two occasions and the Mexican National Women's Tag Team Championship alongside La Rosa. She started her career as an masked wrestler but lost her mermaid inspired mask to Viuda Negra I in 1984. She stopped working full time in 1996, having only wrestled on special occasions since then, with matches in 2007, 2010, 2012 and 2017.

== Championships and accomplishments ==
- Empresa Mexicana de Lucha Libre'

- Mexican National Women's Championship (2 times)

- Comision de Box y Lucha D.F.
  - Distrito Federal Women's Championship (1 time)

- Mexican National Women's Tag Team Championship (1 time – with La Rosa

== Luchas de Apuestas record ==
Winner (wager)	Loser (wager)	Location	Event	Date	Notes
La Sirenita (mask)	La Marquesa (mask)	N/A	show	N/A	
Viuda Negra I (mask)	La Sirenita (mask)	Celaya, Guanajuato	show	June 13, 1984	
Lola González (hair)	La Sirenita (hair)	N/A	show	1995	
La Sirenita (hair)	Shitara (mask)	Auditorio Rio Nilo - Tonala, Jalisco	show	February 5, 1995	
La Sirenita (hair)	Martha Villalobos (hair)	Gimnasio Juan de la Barera - Mexico City	show	December 1, 1995	
La Sirenita (hair)	Karla Ivonne (hair)	Juárez, Chihuahua	show	1997	
