= Mexican National Women's Championship =

Professional wrestling women's championship

- The current championship design

Details
- Promotion: Consejo Mundial de Lucha Libre (CMLL); AAA (previously)
- Date established: 1955
- Current champion: Thunder Rosa
- Date won: July 31, 2026

Other names
- Women's Championship; Occidente Women's championship; Mexican Women's Championship
Statistics
- First champion: La Dama Enmascarada
- Most reigns: Irma González (5 reigns)
- Longest reign: Martha Villalobos (3 years, 304 days)
- Shortest reign: La Diabólica (50 days)

The Mexican National Women's Championship (Spanish: Campeonato Nacional Femenil) is a women's professional wrestling championship for female wrestlers sanctioned by the Comisión de Box y Lucha Libre Mexico D.F. (the Mexico City Boxing and Wrestling Commission). While the Commission sanctions the title, it does not promote the events in which the Championship is defended. The championship is currently promoted by the Mexican Lucha Libre wrestling based promotion Consejo Mundial de Lucha Libre (CMLL) and has in the past also been promoted by the Mexican-based Asistencia Asesoría y Administración (AAA) promotion.

The championship is one of the oldest, still-promoted female professional wrestling championship, preceded only by the NWA World Women's Championship that was created in 1954 while the first Mexican women's champion was crowned in 1955. The current champion is Thunder Rosa, who defeated India Sioux at the Leyenda de Plata final on July 31, 2026, to win the title. It is the 27th Mexican National Women's Championship reign of the modern era.

== History ==
Female wrestlers first appeared in Mexico in 1935 when United States–based wrestlers Mae Stein, Teddy Meyers, Katherine Hart, Louise Francis and Dot Apollo wrestled in Arena México. Women would not be allowed to wrestle in Mexico again until 1942 and then again in 1945 but each time Mexican promoters brought in women from the United States. In the early-, to mid-1950s Jack O'Brien, a successful wrestler in the 1930s and 1940s, trained several Mexican women. The group included Chabela Romero, La Enfermera, Irma González, Rosita Williams, and La Dama Enmascarada ("The Masked Lady"). The first recognized Mexican Women's champion was La Dama Enmascarada who won a tournament in Monterrey in the first half of 1955. The title was originally identified simply as the "Women's Championship" or alternately the "Mexican Women's Championship" in contemporary newspaper coverage. The title would later be won by Irma González on a show held in the el Toreo de Cuatro Caminos bullfighting arena in Naucalpan, State of Mexico. In 1961 then-champion Irma Gonzales was billed as defending the "Occidente" Women's Championship in Guadalajara, but records of the various "Occidente" ("Western States") championships contain no reference to a women's championship before or after 1961, leading to researchers concluding that it was most likely González Women's Championship that was defended that day just labelled as "Occidente".

In the late 1950s the Regent of Mexico City, Ernesto P. Uruchurtu, banned women's wrestling in Mexico City, effectively relegating them to minor shows in other Mexican states. The championship lineage from 1959 until the Mexico City ban on women's wrestling was lifted in Mexico City in 1986 is unclear and was undocumented for a long period of time. In 1986 the Comisión de Box y Lucha Libre Mexico D.F. (the Mexico City Boxing and Wrestling Commission) started licensing female wrestlers to work in Mexico City and officially recognized Reyna Gallegos as the "Mexican National Women's Champion", based on the fact that she was the reigning Mexican Women's Champion, adopting the lineage of the championship retroactively. The commission allowed Empresa Mexicana de Lucha Libre ("Mexican Wrestling Enterprise") to promote the championship and determine who should challenge or win it. Unlike most championships that belong to a specific promotion the Mexican National Women's Championship was not owned by a single promotion, instead, promoters holding shows in Mexico City could petition the commission to have the champion work on their show. From the early 1990s the championship essentially became exclusive to Consejo Mundial de Lucha Libre (CMLL, a renamed EMLL) as it was only defended on CMLL shows for years and only won by wrestlers under CMLL contract. In 1995 Martha Villalobos won the championship on an AAA show, officially transitioning control from CMLL to AAA. In 2004 Lady Apache won the championship from Tiffany on an AAA show, and took the title with her when she joined CMLL in 2005. Lady Apache would later win the CMLL World Women's Championship and then vacated the Mexican National Women's Championship. The championship has remained under CMLL's control since then.

== Reigns ==
The current champion is Thunder Rosa, who defeated India Sioux at the Leyenda de Plata final on July 31, 2026, to win the title. It is her first second reign with the title, the 27th championship reign since the Mexico City Boxing and Wrestling Commission sanctioned the championship, and the 46th overall. Martha Villalobos holds the record for the longest verified individual reign with 1,399 days while Lady Apache's two reigns combine for 1,470 days the longest verified reign of any champion. Due to the undocumented periods prior to 1986 it is possible that someone else has actually held the championship longer, but no verification of such a fact has been found. Irma González has held the title five times, the most for any champion, while six women have held the championship twice since it was officially sanctioned in 1986; Lady Apache, La Sirenita, Tiffany, Martha Villalobos, Reyna Isis and Zuleyma. La Diabólica holds the record for the shortest documented title reign, with 50 days.

== Rules ==
From 1986 the championship has been classified as a "National" title, which means that officially non-Mexican citizens are prohibited from challenging or holding the championship, just like all other Mexican National Championships. There have been instances where those rules have not been strictly enforced, including Puerto Rican Zeuxis winning the championship. Later CMLL announced that she actually had joint citizenship in Puerto Rico and Mexico after she won the championship in 2015. It is unclear if Zeuxis' Puerto Rican heritage is a storyline or not. Up until late 2021, all championship matches promoted in Mexico took place under best two-out-of-three falls rules. On occasion single fall title matches took place, for example when promoting CMLL title matches in Japan, conforming to the traditions of the local promotion, for instance when Princesa Blanca defended the championship against Lady Apache in Korakuen Hall in Tokyo, Japan. As it is a professional wrestling championship, it is not won legitimately; it is instead won via a scripted ending to a match or awarded to a wrestler because of a storyline.

== Title history ==
Key
| No. | Overall reign number |
| Reign | Reign number for the specific champion |
| Days | Number of days held |
| N/A | Unknown information |
| (NLT) | Championship change took place "no later than" the date listed |
| + | Current reign is changing daily |

| No. | Champion | Championship change | | | Reign statistics | | Notes | Ref. |
| No. | Champion | Date | Event | Location | Reign | Days | Notes | Ref. |
|---|---|---|---|---|---|---|---|---|
Lucha Libre AAA Worldwide (AAA)
| 1 | La Dama Enmascarada | 1955 | Live event | Monterrey, Nuevo León | 1 | N/A | Won a tournament to become the first women's champion. | |
| 2 | Irma González | February 28, 1955 | Live event | Naucalpan, State of Mexico | 1 | 489 | | f198 |
| 3 | Rosita Williams | July 1, 1956 | Live event | Guadalajara, Jalisco | 1 | N/A | | |
Championship history is unrecorded from July 1, 1956 to 1958.
| 4 | Irma González | 1958 (NLT) | Live event | (Note: The location of the championship match was not captured as part of the result documentation.) | 2 | N/A | | |
| 5 | La Dama Enmascarada | September 28, 1958 | Live event | Torreón, Coahuila | 2 | N/A | | |
Championship history is unrecorded from 1957 to 1958.
| 6 | Chabela Romero | 1958 (NLT) | Live event | | 1 | N/A | Also known as "Isabela Romero" | |
Championship history is unrecorded from 1958 to 1959.
| 7 | Rosita Williams | 1959 | Live event | | 2 | N/A | | |
Championship history is unrecorded from 1959 to 1959.
| 8 | Irma González | 1959 | Live event | | 3 | N/A | | |
Championship history is unrecorded from 1959 to December 6, 1964.
| 9 | Chabela Romero | December 6, 1964 | Live event | | 2 | 522 | | |
| 10 | Jarochita Rivero | May 12, 1966 | Live event | Puebla, Puebla | 1 | 91 | | |
| 11 | Chabela Romero | August 11, 1966 | Live event | Tampico, Tampico | 3 | N/A | | |
Championship history is unrecorded from August 11, 1966 to 1980 (NLT).
| 12 | Irma González | 1980 (NLT) | Live event | | 4 | N/A | | |
| 13 | Rossy Moreno | 1980 | Live event | | 1 | N/A | | |
Championship history is unrecorded from 1980 to 1982 (NLT).
| 14 | Lola González | 1982 (NLT) | Live event | | 1 | N/A | | |
| 15 | Rossy Moreno | 1982 | Live event | Cuautitlán Izcalli, State of Mexico | 1 | N/A | | |
| 16 | Vicky Carranza | 1982–1983 | Live event | | 1 | N/A | | |
Championship history is unrecorded from 1983 to June 16, 1983.
| 17 | Lola González | June 16, 1983 (NLT) | Live event | | 1 | N/A | | |
| 18 | Vicky Carranza | June 17, 1983 | WCCW Star Wars | Dallas, Texas, USA | 2 | N/A | | |
Championship history is unrecorded from June 17, 1983 to 1984.
| 19 | Irma González | 1984 (NLT) | Live event | | 5 | N/A | | |
Championship history is unrecorded from 1984 to March 30, 1986.
| 20 | Reyna Gallegos | March 30, 1986 | Live event | Apatlaco, Morelos | 1 | (Note: The exact date on which the title was vacated is not known, which means the title reign lasted between 642 and 730 days) | Defeated La Briosa to win the championship in a tournament final. | |
| — | Vacated | 1988 | — | — | — | — | The championship was vacated when Reyna Gallegos retired. | |
| 21 | La Briosa | March 30, 1988 | Live event | Apatalco, Morelos | 1 | 102 | Defeated Zuleyma in tournament final to win the championship. | |
| 22 | Zuleyma | July 19, 1988 | Live event | Xochimilco, Mexican Federal District | 1 | 394 | | |
| 23 | La Marquesa | August 8, 1989 | Live event | Apatalco, Morelos | 1 | 234 | | |
| 24 | Zuleyma | March 30, 1990 | Live event | Mexico City | 2 | 330 | | |
| — | Vacated | February 12, 1991 | — | — | — | — | Championship vacated when Zuleyma won the UWA World Women's Championship. | |
| 25 | Neftali | November 7, 1991 | Live event | Ciudad Nezahualcóyotl, State of Mexico | 1 | 253 | Defeated Vicky Carranza to win the vacant championship. | |
| 26 | La Sirenita | July 17, 1992 | Live event | Cuautla, Morelos | 1 | (Note: The exact date on which the title was vacated is not known, which means the title reign lasted between 168 and 198 days) | | |
| — | Vacated | January 1993 | — | — | — | — | The championship vacated when La Sirenita became pregnant. | |
| 27 | La Diabólica | August 21, 1993 | CMLL live event | Mexico City | 1 | 50 | Defeated Lady Apache in a tournament final to win the championship | |
| — | Vacated | October 10, 1993 | — | — | — | — | The championship was vacated when La Diabólica won the CMLL World Women's Championship. | |
| 28 | La Sirenita | January 18, 1994 | CMLL Martes De Coliseo | Mexico City | 2 | 676 | Defeated Maria del Angel to win the vacant championship | |
| 29 | Martha Villalobos | November 25, 1995 | AAA live event | Culiacán, Sinaloa | 1 | (Note: The exact date that Villalobos' title reign ended is unknown which lasted between 1 day and 208 days.) | | |
Championship history is unrecorded from November 25, 1995 to June 21, 1996.
| 30 | Martha Villalobos | June 21, 1996 | AAA live event | Culiacán, Sinaloa | 2 | 1,399 | Defeated La Practicante to win the vacant championship | |
| 31 | Tiffany | April 20, 2000 | AAA Sin Limite | San Luis Potosí, San Luis Potosí | 1 | 745 | | |
| 32 | Lady Apache | May 5, 2002 | AAA live event | Monterrey, Nuevo León | 1 | 301 | | |
| 33 | Tiffany | March 2, 2003 | Live event | Monterrey, Nuevo León | 2 | 336 | | |
| 34 | Lady Apache | February 1, 2004 | AAA live event | Zapopan, Jalisco | 2 | 1,169 | | |
| — | Vacated | April 15, 2007 | — | — | — | — | The championship was vacated four months after Lady Apache won the CMLL World Women's Championship. | |
Consejo Mundial de Lucha Libre (CMLL)
| 35 | Marcela | May 4, 2007 | CMLL live event | Mexico City | 1 | 637 | Defeated Princesa Sujei in a tournament final to win the vacant championship. After a while Consejo Mundial de Lucha Libre (CMLL) adopted the championship. | |
| 36 | Princesa Blanca | January 30, 2009 | CMLL live event | Mexico City | 1 | 1,397 | | |
| 37 | Estrellita | November 27, 2012 | CMLL live event | Guadalajara, Jalisco | 1 | 783 | | |
| 38 | Zeuxis | January 19, 2015 | CMLL live event | Puebla, Puebla | 1 | 768 | | |
| 39 | Princesa Sugehit | February 25, 2017 | CMLL live event | Mexico City | 1 | 672 | | |
| 40 | La Metálica | December 29, 2018 | CMLL live event | Mexico City | 1 | 636 | | |
| 41 | Reyna Isis | September 25, 2020 | CMLL 87th Anniversary Show | Mexico City | 1 | 417 | | |
| 42 | Dark Silueta | November 16, 2021 | CMLL Live event | Mexico City | 1 | 575 | | |
| — | Vacated | June 14, 2023 | — | — | — | — | Dark Silueta was injured and vacated the title, because she wanted to tour Japan upon her return. | |
| 43 | Reyna Isis | July 14, 2023 | CMLL Atlantis 40th Anniversary Show | Mexico City, Mexico | 2 | 441 | Defeated Lluvia to win the vacant championship. | |
| 44 | Sanely | September 27, 2024 | CMLL Noche de Campeones | Mexico City, Mexico | 1 | 161 | | |
| 45 | India Sioux | March 7, 2025 | CMLL live event | Mexico City, Mexico | 1 | 511 | | |
| 46 | Thunder Rosa | July 31, 2026 | CMLL live event | Mexico City, Mexico | 1 | 110+ | | |

== Reigns by combined length ==
Key

| Symbol | Meaning |
|---|---|
| ¤ | The exact length of at least one title reign is uncertain, so the shortest possible length is used. |
| † | Indicates the current champion |
| + | Indicates that the date changes daily for the current champion. |

| Rank | Wrestler | # of reigns | Combined days (Note: Due to the uncertainty of dates and events prior to the modern age of the Mexican National Women's Championship these reigns are not included in the combined reigns list) | Ref(s). |
|---|---|---|---|---|
| 1 | Lady Apache | 2 | 1,470 | |
| 2 | Martha Villalobos | 2 | 1,399¤ | |
| 3 | Princesa Blanca | 1 | 1,397 | |
| 4 | Tiffany | 2 | 1,081 | |
| 5 | Reyna Isis | 2 | 858 | |
| 6 | La Sirenita | 2 | 844¤ | |
| 7 | Estrellita | 1 | 783 | |
| 8 | Zeuxis | 1 | 768 | |
| 9 | Zuleyma | 2 | 724 | |
| 10 | Princesa Sugehit | 1 | 672 | |
| 11 | Reyna Gallegos | 1 | 642¤ | |
| 12 | Marcela | 1 | 637 | |
| 13 | La Metálica | 1 | 636 | |
| 14 | Dark Silueta | 1 | 575 | |
| 15 | India Sioux | 1 | 511 | |
| 16 | Neftali | 1 | 253 | |
| 17 | La Marqueza | 1 | 234 | |
| 18 | Sanely | 1 | 161 | |
| 19 | Thunder Rosa | 1 | 110+ | |
| 20 | La Briosa | 1 | 102 | |
| 21 | Jarochita Rivero | 1 | 91 | |
| 22 | La Diabólica | 1 | 51 | |
