= Rossy Moreno =

Mexican professional wrestler (born 1965)

Personal information
- Born: María del Rocío Moreno León; October 17, 1965 (age 60) Mexico City, Mexico
- Spouses: Dr. Wagner Jr. (Ex-husband); Ruso Flores (Ex-husband)
- Children: El Hijo de Dr. Wagner Jr. (son); Galeno del Mal (son)
- Parent: Alfonso Moreno (father)
- Relatives: El Oriental (brother); Cynthia Moreno (sister); Alda Moreno (sister); Esther Moreno (sister)

Professional wrestling career
- Ring name(s): Rossy Moreno; La Enfermera
- Billed height: 1.65 m (5 ft 5 in)
- Billed weight: 69 kg (152 lb)
- Trained by: Alfonso Moreno; Ray Mendoza; Blue Panther; Pirata Morgan
- Debut: December 30, 1978

María del Rocío "Rossy" Moreno León (born October 17, 1965) is a Mexican professional wrestler. In AAA she is a former AAA Reina de Reinas Champion and a two-time Mexican National Women's Champion.

== Personal life ==
Moreno is a member of an extended professional wrestling family founded by her father Alfonso Moreno who was both a wrestler and a wrestling promoter and her mother who took over promoting wrestling in Arena Azteca Budokan in Nezahualcoyotl, Mexico State after Alfonso Moreno died. Rossy's sisters Esther, Cynthia and Alda Moreno are or have been professional wrestlers as well as her brother who works as El Oriental. She is the ex-wife of Dr. Wagner Jr. and they have a son who wrestles as El Hijo de Dr. Wagner Jr.

== Championships and accomplishments ==
- Lucha Libre AAA Worldwide
  - AAA Reina de Reinas Championship (1 time)
- Consejo Mundial de Lucha Libre
  - Mexican National Women's Championship (2 times)
