= Queen of the Ring (film) =

American biopic film

- Theatrical release poster
- Directed by: Ash Avildsen
- Screenplay by: Ash Avildsen
- Based on: The Queen of the Ring: Sex, Muscles, Diamonds, and the Making of an American Legend by Jeff Leen
- Produced by: Aimee Schoof; Isen Robbins; B. D. Gunnell; Ash Avildsen
- Starring: Emily Bett Rickards; Josh Lucas; Tyler Posey; Francesca Eastwood; Marie Avgeropoulos; Deborah Ann Woll; Cara Buono; Adam Demos; Martin Kove; Kelli Berglund; Damaris Lewis; Gavin Casalegno; Walton Goggins; Jim Cornette
- Cinematography: Andrew Strahorn
- Edited by: Craig Hayes
- Music by: Aaron Gilhuis
- Production companies: Sumerian Pictures; Intrinsic Value Films
- Distributed by: Sumerian Pictures
- Release dates: October 15, 2024 (Buffalo International Film Festival); March 7, 2025 (United States)
- Running time: 140 minutes
- Country: United States
- Language: English
- Box office: $657,718

Queen of the Ring is a 2024 American biographical sports drama about female professional wrestler Mildred Burke. The film is written and directed by Ash Avildsen. It stars Emily Bett Rickards as Burke, with Josh Lucas, Tyler Posey, Francesca Eastwood, Deborah Ann Woll, Cara Buono, and Walton Goggins in supporting roles.

== Premise ==
The film chronicles the life of revolutionary female wrestler Mildred Burke.

In an era when women were barred from the ring, Mildred Burke shattered every rule in the book. A single mother, she fought her way from underground matches to the pinnacle of professional wrestling, becoming the sport's first million-dollar female athlete. Defying skeptics, opponents, and a system determined to shut her out, Burke carved her legacy as the longest-reigning champion in history.

== Cast ==
- Emily Bett Rickards as Mildred Burke
- Josh Lucas as Billy Wolfe
- Tyler Posey as G. Bill
- Walton Goggins as Jack Pfefer
- Francesca Eastwood as Mae Young
- Marie Avgeropoulos as Elvira Snodgrass
- Deborah Ann Woll as Gladys Gillem
- Cara Buono as Bertha
- Kailey Farmer as June Byers
- Gavin Casalegno as Joe Jr.
- Adam Demos as Gorgeous George
- Kelli Berglund as Nell Stewart
- Damaris Lewis as Babs Wingo
- Martin Kove as Al Haft
- James M Cornette as NWA Commissioner
- Toni Rossall as Clara Mortensen
- Trinity Fatu as Ethel Johnson
- Mickie James as Fabulous Moolah
- Britt Baker as Debbie Nichols

== Production ==
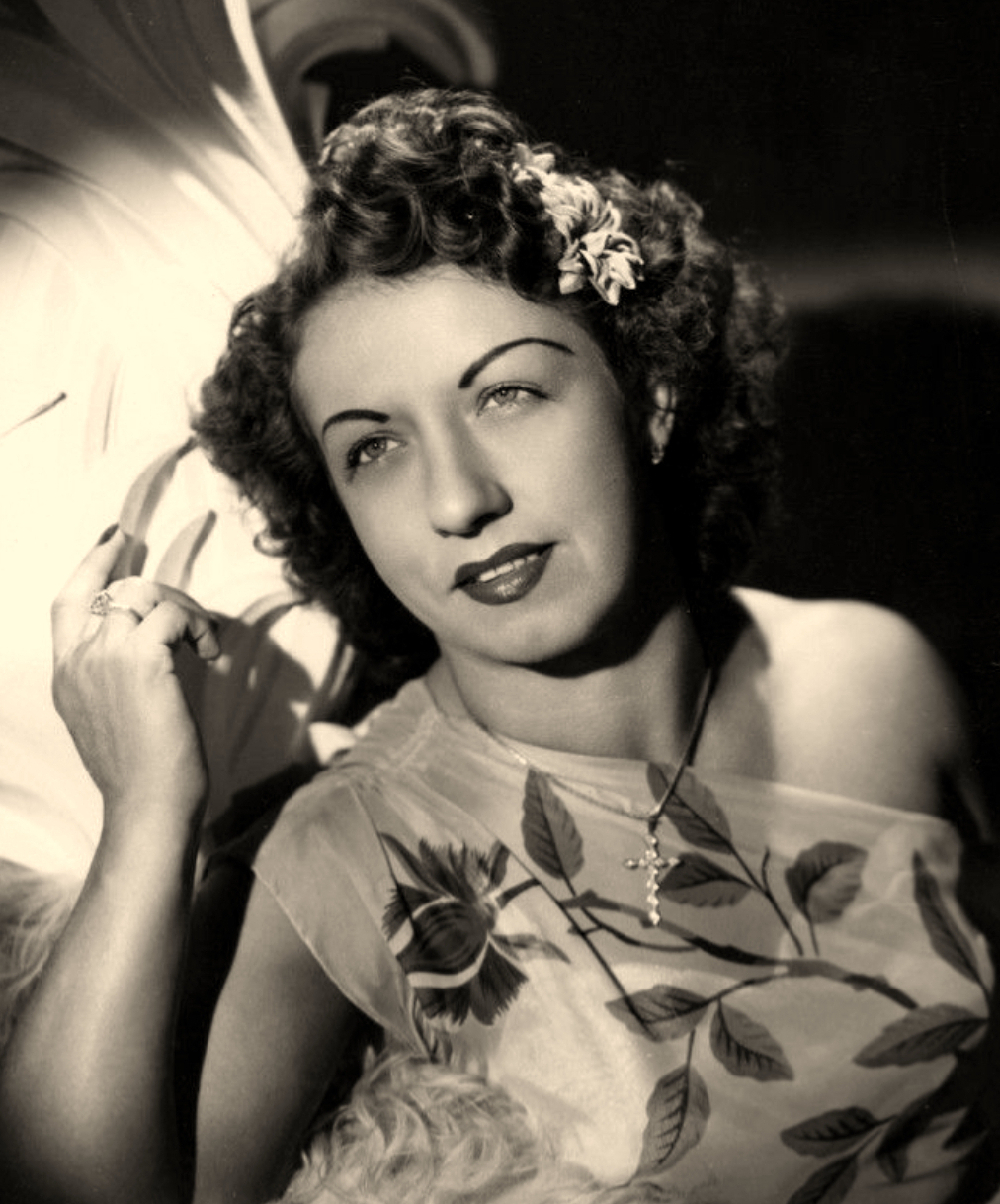
Wrestler Mildred Burke, whose life the film is based on

The film is written and directed by Ash Avildsen, inspired by the 2010 book The Queen of the Ring: Sex, Muscles, Diamonds, and the Making of an American Legend by Jeff Leen, and Burke's own manuscripts. Jim Ross is executive producer on the film. Aimee Schoof and Isen Robbins of Intrinsic Value Films and TV and B.D. Gunnell are the producers on the film.

Principal photography took place in Louisville, Kentucky. In July 2023, the film received dispensation to continue filming during the 2023 SAG-AFTRA strike.

=== Casting ===
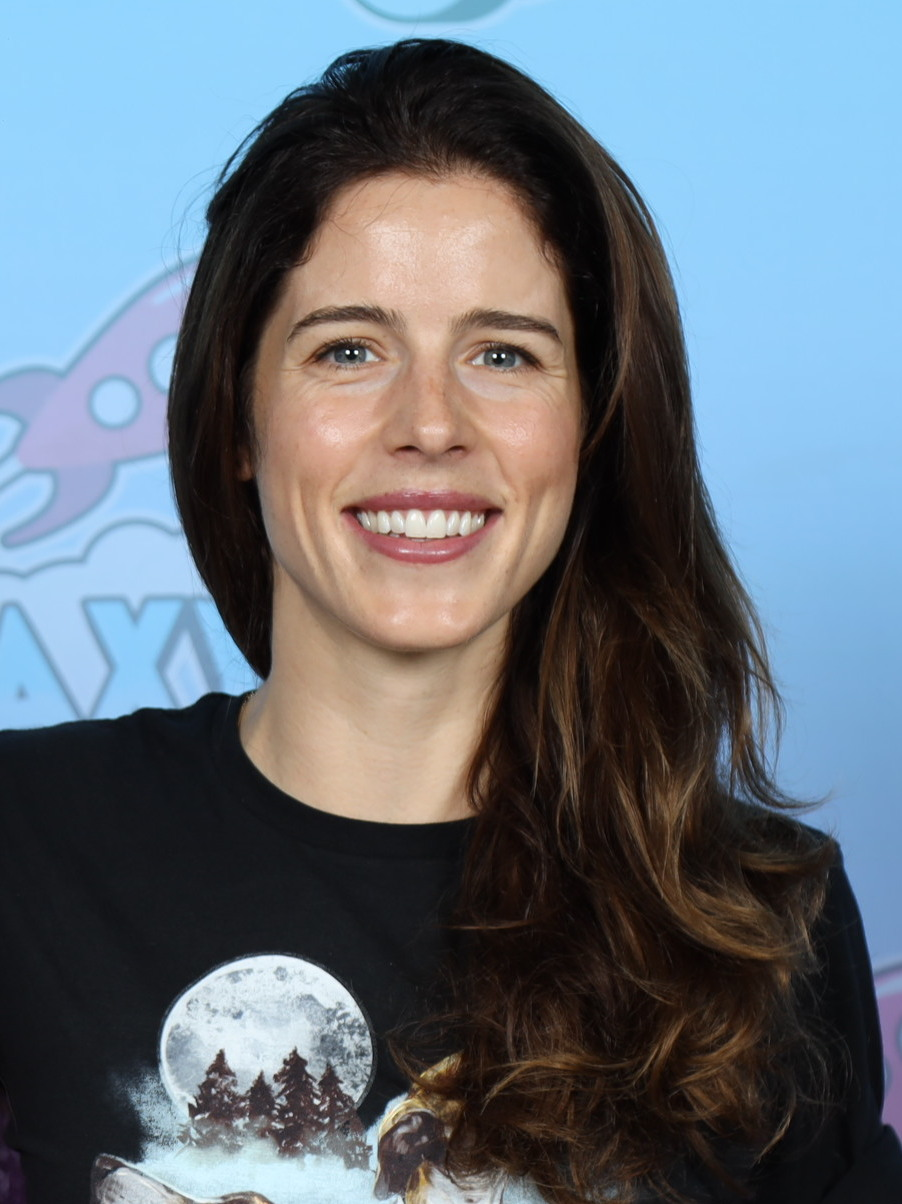
Actress Emily Bett Rickards, who plays Burke in the film (pictured in 2023)

In May 2023, Emily Bett Rickards was cast as the lead in the film as Mildred Burke while Josh Lucas was cast as Billy Wolfe. At this time, Marie Avgeropoulos was cast as Babe Gordon.

In June 2023, Walton Goggins, Francesca Eastwood, and Deborah Ann Woll joined the cast, with Gavin Casalegno cast as Mildred's teen age son Joe later that month. Charlotte Flair and Liv Morgan had to withdraw from their roles as June Byers and Clara Mortensen due to scheduling and injury issues, respectively, and were replaced by NWA Women's Champion Kamille and AEW Women's Champion Toni Storm. In June 2023, Trinity Fatu joined the cast. Kelli Berglund was cast in August 2023, having previously also played a wrestler on the television series Heels.

== Release ==
Queen of the Ring premiered at the Buffalo International Film Festival on October 15, 2024. It was released in theaters in the United States on March 7, 2025, by Sumerian Pictures.

== Soundtrack ==
Sumerian Records released the soundtrack album for the film featuring ten songs from the movie. It includes songs produced by the films composer, Aaron Gilhuis.

Queen of the Ring (Music from the Motion Picture) track listing
No.	Title	Performer(s)	Length
1.	"Dust in the Wind"	Corey Taylor feat. Bad Omens & Aaron Gilhuis	4:19
2.	"Keep Your Lamp Trimmed and Burning"	Zoe Wees & Aaron Gilhuis	2:40
3.	"Dead Beat Lover"	Lanie Gardner	3:06
4.	"Never Ending Moment"	Des Rocs & Aaron Gilhuis	4:17
5.	"Burned You"	Zhavia	3:18
6.	"God's Gonna Cut You Down"	Larkin Poe & Aaron Gilhuis	3:53
7.	"The Seeker"	Danny Worsnop & Aaron Gilhuis	3:24
8.	"The Unforgiven"	Kittie, DIAMANTE, & The Pretty Wild & Aaron Gilhuis	5:52
9.	"A Woman Scorned"	Lanie Gardner	2:58
10.	"House of the Rising Sun"	Kat Von D	4:41
Total length:			38:28

== Reception ==
On the review aggregator website Rotten Tomatoes, 74% of 53 critics' reviews are positive, with an average rating of 6.4/10. The website's consensus reads: "Emily Bett Rickards is terrific in this straightforward sports biopic, which puts on a good show even if it only glancingly grapples with the surface details of its true story." Metacritic, which uses a weighted average, assigned the film a score of 65 out of 100, based on 9 critics, indicating "generally favorable" reviews.

Nick Bythrow of Screen Rant gave the film a positive score, stating, "Queen of the Ring uses the story of Mildred Burke to expertly explore women's pro wrestling in a time when they weren't allowed in the sport."

Frank Scheck of The Hollywood Reporter also provided a positive review, writing, "Despite its low budget, the film looks terrific, effectively conveying its vintage settings thanks to Andrew Strahorn's handsome, sepia-tinged cinematography and Sofija Mesicek's period-perfect costumes." He praised the strong performances of the cast, in particular lead Emily Bett Rickards, whose performance he credited as giving the film its heart and soul".
