= Ethel Johnson (wrestler) =

American professional wrestler

Personal information
- Born: Ethel Blanche Wingo; May 14, 1935 Decatur, Georgia, U.S.
- Died: September 14, 2018 (aged 83) Columbus, Ohio, U.S.
- Cause of death: Heart disease
- Spouse: Leon Hairston (–2010)
- Children: 3

Professional wrestling career
- Ring name(s): Ethel Johnson; Rita Valdez
- Billed height: 5 ft 5 in (1.65 m)
- Billed weight: 115 lb (52 kg)
- Trained by: Mildred Burke
- Debut: 1952
- Retired: 1976

Ethel Blanche Hairston (née Wingo; May 14, 1935 – September 14, 2018) was an American professional wrestler whose ring name was Ethel Johnson. She debuted at age 16, becoming the first African-American women's champion. She was a fan favorite, billed as "the biggest attraction to hit girl wrestling since girl wrestling began."

== Professional wrestling career ==
Johnson started her training after her sister Babs Wingo, the first African-American woman to desegregate professional wrestling, in the 1950s, signing with the promoter Billy Wolfe. Their younger sister Marva Scott would later join professional wrestling as well. In 1952, Johnson, along with her sisters worked three matches including a tag team match in the main event at Baltimore, Maryland, which drew the highest record crowd of 3,611 fans. By 1954, Johnson and Wingo received top billing alongside Gorgeous George, after drawing 9,000 fans at the Municipal Auditorium in Kansas City, Missouri. While touring Latin America, Johnson worked under the name Rita Valdez.

Johnson was known for her athleticism, being one of the first female wrestlers to perform a standing dropkick in her matches, as well as including a variation of the flying headscissors

During her time in wrestling, Johnson faced popular wrestlers at the time such as June Byers and Penny Banner, and even challenging Mildred Burke for her NWA World Women's Championship. Eventually, Johnson caught Stu Hart's eye and began working for his promotion Big Time Wrestling as well as wrestling for the Capitol Wrestling Corporation. In her final years in wrestling, Johnson worked at American Wrestling Association, where her last match was against her sister Marva Scott in 1976.

== Personal life ==
Johnson was born Ethel Blanche Wingo in Decatur, Georgia, to Gladys Chase and Clifford Wingo on May 14, 1935. Johnson had two other wrestling sisters: her older sister, Betty (ring name: Babs Wingo), and younger sister, Marva (ring name: Marva Scott).

Johnson took her stage name to differentiate her from Betty, who became a professional at about the same time. They often wrestled each other, but many fans would not know that they were related. Johnson said it was every women's wrestlers' dream to perform in Madison Square Garden, but women's wrestling was banned in New York during her prime. She retired in 1977 without ever performing there.

Johnson died of heart disease on September 14, 2018, in Columbus, Ohio. She was 83.

== Filmography ==
Year	Title	Role	Notes
2016	Lady Wrestler: The Amazing, Untold Story of African American Women in the Ring	Herself	Documentary

== Championships and accomplishments ==
- Independent
  - Colored Women's World Championship (3 times)
  - Ohio Women's Tag Team Championship (1 time) – with Marva Scott
  - Texas Colored Women's Championship (2 times)
- National Wrestling Alliance
  - NWA World Women's Tag Team Championship (1 time) – with June Byers
- Women's Wrestling Hall of Fame
  - Class of 2023
- WWE
  - WWE Hall of Fame (Class of 2021)
