= Katie Glass =

American professional wrestler (born 1944)

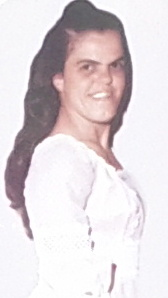
- Glass in the 1980s

Personal information
- Born: 1 June 1944 (age 82)

Professional wrestling career
- Ring name: Diamond Lil
- Billed height: 3 ft 8 in (1.12 m)
- Billed weight: 86 lb (39 kg)
- Trained by: The Fabulous Moolah
- Debut: 1963

Katie Glass (born June 1, 1944) is a retired professional wrestler, better known by her ring name "Diamond Lil".

== Professional wrestling career ==
Glass was trained by The Fabulous Moolah at her wrestling school in South Carolina. She first appeared at Moolah's door in 1961 at the age of seventeen, wanting to be trained as a professional wrestler. Moolah would not accept Glass until her mother signed a permission slip. Due to Moolah's love of diamonds and Glass's small stature, she was given the ring name Diamond Lil.

Throughout the 1960s, Glass frequently wrestled against fellow female midget wrestler Darling Dagmar. Glass teamed with Ann Casey during a match in June 1971, which they lost to Dagmar and Vicki Williams. In the late 1970s, she had several matches against female midget star Princess Little Dove.

Glass eventually retired as a professional wrestler due to a scarcity of midget opponents on the independent circuit.

== Personal life ==
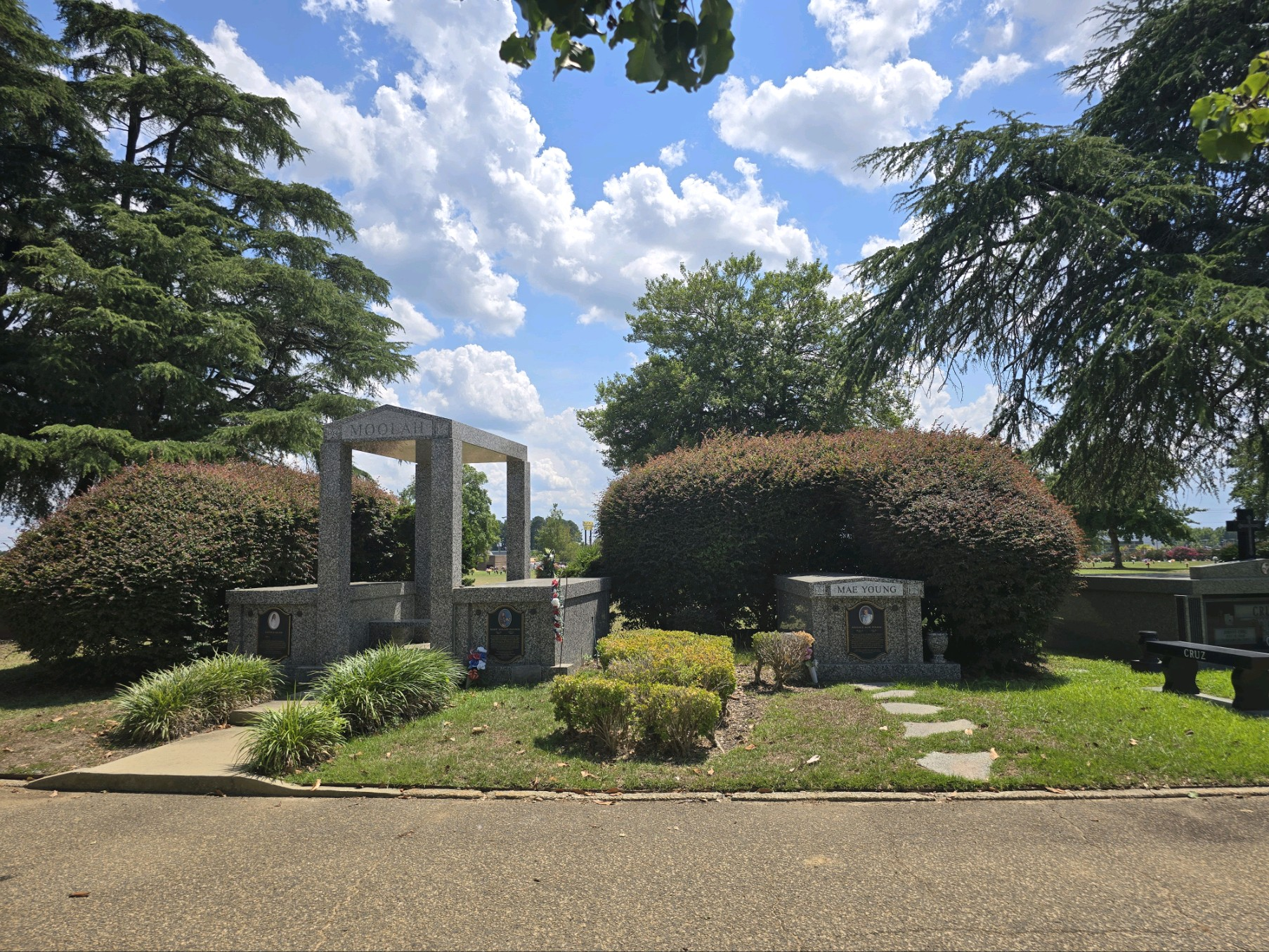
The Fabulous Moolah crypt in Columbia, SC's Greenlawn Cemetery has a space reserved for Glass.

Glass moved in with Moolah at age of 17. She lived with Moolah for over 40 years (and with Mae Young beginning in 1991), until Moolah died. Moolah and Glass had a mother–daughter relationship. Glass even referred to Moolah as "Ma". In 1999, Moolah introduced Glass as "my damned midget" on The Daily Show hosted by Jon Stewart.

== Championships and accomplishments ==
- Cauliflower Alley Club
  - Other honoree (1992)
  - Other honoree (1997)
