= NWA World Women's Championship =

Women's professional wrestling world championship

- The center plate of the championship, introduced September 30, 2019. Pictured in the center is former champion Allysin Kay; the photo gets updated with every champion.

Details
- Promotion: National Wrestling Alliance
- Date established: 1950
- Current champion: Tiffany Nieves
- Date won: April 4, 2026 (aired May 16, 2026)

Other names
- NWA Women's Championship (1950–2016); NWA World Women's Championship (2016–present)
Statistics
- First champion: Mildred Burke
- Most reigns: The Fabulous Moolah (4 times)
- Longest reign: The Fabulous Moolah (3rd reign, 3,841 days)
- Shortest reign: Evelyn Stevens and Malia Hosaka (1 day)
- Oldest champion: The Fabulous Moolah (55 years)
- Youngest champion: Kenzie Paige (21 years, 5 months and 22 days)

The NWA World Women's Championship is a women's professional wrestling world championship created and promoted by the American professional wrestling promotion National Wrestling Alliance (NWA). The title was first held by Mildred Burke in 1950, who was recognized as champion due to her February 11, 1937, defeat of Women's World Champion Clara Mortensen.

== History ==
Mildred Burke was recognized as the inaugural champion in 1950. After her Two out of three falls match against June Byers in 1954 ended in a no contest, Byers was recognized as the NWA World Women's Champion, and Burke created the WWWA World Championship and was recognized as its first champion. Upon June Byers's retirement in 1964, it was held primarily (and operated) by Lillian Ellison (under the ring name of The Fabulous Moolah), who first won a disputed version of the championship in a battle royal on September 18, 1956, although she was recognized only in the Northeastern United States (the home territory of what was then the Capitol Wrestling Corporation, later the World Wrestling Federation and now WWE) and was not universally recognized as champion until after Byers' retirement due to most other NWA promoters continuing to recognize Byers.

In 1983, the physical belt was sold by Ellison to the WWF, where it became the WWF Women's Championship. The World Wrestling Federation recognized Moolah as the reigning champion but did not recognize any of the title changes that had occurred since Moolah was first awarded the title in 1956. The NWA Women's title continued its lineage after Moolah's belt was purchased and renamed by the WWF.

The Fabulous Moolah has held the title more times than any other wrestler, with a total of four reigns. She also has the longest reign of 3,651 days, and is the oldest champion after winning the title at 55 years old. Evelyn Stevens and Malia Hosaka have the shortest reign at 1 day each. La Reina de Corazones is the youngest champion after winning the title at 21 years of age. Overall, the title has been held by 25 different women for a total of 35 reigns.

Via various partnerships, the NWA World Women's Championship has also been defended in other promotions.

== Belt design ==
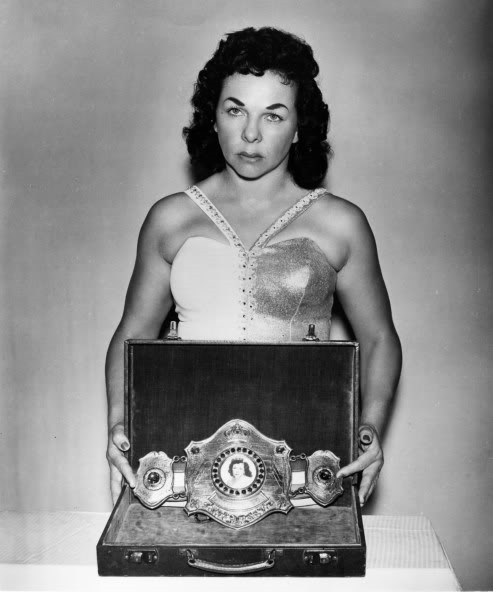
The Fabulous Moolah with the second design of the NWA World Women's Championship; which she ended up selling to the WWE

1950 - 1954: Mildred Burke defeated Clara Mortensen on February 11, 1937, to win the original version of the Women's World Championship. Due to her victory, Burke was recognized as the inaugural NWA Woman's Champion in 1950. The original title belt last appeared in an NWA ring on August 20, 1954. In 2021, The main plate of the original belt was given to NWA President, Billy Corgan.

1954 - 1986: Sometime after August 1954, a new design was presented. In 1983, During The Fabulous Moolah's reign as champion, the World Wrestling Federation (WWF, now WWE) withdrew from the National Wrestling Alliance (NWA), and The Fabulous Moolah sold the championship to the WWF.

1986 - 2002, 2016 - 2019: In February 1986, a new title was introduced. It featured 3 plates on a black strap. The main plate is circular with the NWA Logo at the top. There are two black banners at the top and bottom, the top reading "WOMANS" and the bottom reading "CHAMPION", both in gold letters. The center of the main plate has a silver oval with a globe on the inside. The side plate are oval shaped. They feature the NWA Logo on both side plates. This design lasted until August 2002. In September 2016, the NWA returned to using this design. The title was then renamed to the NWA Woman's World Championship. This title was mostly used by Jazz during this time. This design lasted until 2019.

2002 - 2010: In August 2002, a new design was created. This design features 5 plates on a black strap. The main plate is gold. The plate features a black oval in the center with the NWA logo on it. The top of the belt reads "World Womans" at the top and has a black banner at the bottom which reads "Champion". Below the black banner, it also has a red crown. Over time, the black oval was changed to red. There are 4 side rectangular side plates that feature the flags of some countries. Those being Switzerland, Japan, America, Italy, Mexico, Germany, Russia, and United Kingdom.

2010 - 2014: In 2010, a large new belt was introduced. This belt, like the previous version, has 5 plates on a black strap, all in gold. The main plate is large. It features the red NWA logo in the center. There are 3 black banners, 1 on the top and 2 at the bottom. The top one reads "Womans". The second banner located at the bottom reads "World". Below that is another black banner that reads "Wrestling Champion". The side plates, like the previous version, are rectangular with the flags of some countries, those being United Kingdom, Australia, America, Italy, Canada, Japan, Mexico, and Brazil. This design lasted until January 2014.

2014 - 2016: In January 2014, another design was introduced. Unlike the previous version, this design is much smaller. The belt has 5 hexagonal plates on a black leather strap. This design was replaced with the '86 - '02 championship in 2016.

The main plate of the belt introduced in 2019 with the picture of former champion, Allysin Kay.

2019–present: On September 30, 2019, NWA President, Billy Corgan presented a new NWA World Womans Championship. The belt was made by Belts By Dan. The design pays homage to the original design of the championship. The belt has 3 plates on a white strap. The plates are silver. The main plate pays homage to the original version of the championship. It features an angel at the top of the plate. There are 2 black banners on the top and bottom. The top banner reads "National Wrestling Alliance" and the bottem reading "Women's World Champion", just like the original design. The center of the plate features a picture frame that has a picture of the wrestler that holds the championship, which changes with each champion, also from the original design. Above the picture frame has the year 1948, which was the year the NWA was founded. Surrounding the picture frame and the 1948 are branches with leaves on them. On the left and right of the belt, there are shields with wrestlers engraved on them. The main plate also features 12 red gems all over the belt. The side plates are oval shaped and feature the NWA logo on it.

== Reigns ==
As of November 13, 2026, there have been 44 reigns, between 34 wrestlers and eight vacancies. Mildred Burke was the inaugural champion. The Fabulous Moolah holds the record for most recognized reigns at four. Moolah is the oldest champion at 55 years old, while La Reina de Corazones is the youngest at 21 years old. Moolah's third reign is the longest at 3,841 days, while Evelyn Stevens and Malia Hosaka's reigns are the shortest at one day each.

Tiffany Nieves is the current champion in her first reign. She defeated Natalia Markova in her Burke Invitational Gauntlet cash-in match during the 2026 Crockett Cup event on April 4, 2026 in Forney, Texas. (aired on tape delay on May 16, 2026 in an episode of NWA Powerrr).

=== Names ===
Name	Year
NWA Women's Championship	1950 – 2016
NWA World Women's Championship	September 16, 2016 – present

Key
No.	Overall reign number
Reign	Reign number for the specific champion
Days	Number of days held
†	Championship change is unrecognized by the promotion
+	Current reign is changing daily

No.	Champion	Championship change			Reign statistics		Notes	Ref.
No.	Champion	Date	Event	Location	Reign	Days	Notes	Ref.
National Wrestling Alliance (NWA)
1	Mildred Burke	1950	Live event	N/A	1		Burke defeated Clara Mortensen on February 11, 1937, to win the original version of the Women's World Championship. Due to her victory, Burke was recognized as the inaugural NWA champion in 1950.	
2	June Byers	August 20, 1954	Live event	Atlanta, GA	2	(Note: The exact date that Byers' championship was vacated is disputed, therefore, it is unknown for how many days Byers held the championship.)	Byers wrestled Mildred Burke for the NWA World Women's Championship in a two out of three falls match. The commission stopped the match between Burke and Byers at the end of the second fall, stripped Burke of the title, and awarded it to Byers. Burke set up the WWWA World Championship and continued to recognize herself as the World Women's Champion.	
—	Vacated	1956/1964	—	—	—	—	In 1956, the NWA promoters of New York, New Jersey and Baltimore (led by Vince McMahon Sr.) stopped recognizing June Byers as champion and she was stripped of the championship by the Baltimore Athletic Commission. Byers, with the support of promoter Billy Wolfe, continued to be recognized by the majority of the National Wrestling Alliance until her retirement in 1964.	
3	The Fabulous Moolah	September 18, 1956	Live event	Baltimore, MD	1	3,651	Moolah defeated Judy Grable at the end of a 13-woman battle royal. Moolah was not fully recognized by the National Wrestling Alliance as the new NWA World Women's Champion until 1964 because Billy Wolfe, with whom Moolah had a falling-out earlier in her career, still controlled most of the NWA. Penny Banner, the AWA World Women's champion, was also briefly recognized in some NWA territories after Byers' retirement in 1964.	
4	Bette Boucher	September 17, 1966	Live event	Seattle, WA	1	16		
5	The Fabulous Moolah	October 3, 1966	Live event	Vancouver BC, Canada	2	524		
6	Yukiko Tomoe	March 10, 1968	Live event	Osaka, Japan	1	23		
7	The Fabulous Moolah	April 2, 1968	Live event	Hamamatsu, Shizuoka, Japan	3	3,841		
8	Evelyn Stevens	October 8, 1978	Live event	Dallas, TX	1	1		
9	The Fabulous Moolah	October 9, 1978	Live event	Fort Worth, TX	4^{(5)}	1,909		
—	Vacated	December 31, 1983	—	—	—	—	The World Wrestling Federation (WWF) withdrew from the NWA in 1983, and The Fabulous Moolah sold the championship to the WWF. The WWF recognized Moolah as champion but did not acknowledge previous title changes: see WWE Women's Championship.	
10	Debbie Combs	February 12, 1986	Live event	Honolulu, HI	1	(Note: The exact date that Combs' championship was vacated is unknown, therefore, it is unknown for how many days Combs held the championship.)	Combs won the vacant championship in a 9-woman battle royal against Candi Devine, Despina Montagos, Eva Savage, Lady Satan, Princess Jasmine, Roxie Rush, Reggie Schwartz, and Sherri Martel.	
—	Vacated	1987	—	—	—	—	The championship was declared vacant in 1987 when the Kansas City promotion withdrew from the NWA.	
11	Debbie Combs	April 10, 1987	Live event	Kansas City, MO	2	(Note: The exact date that Combs lost the championship is unknown, therefore, it is unknown for how many days Combs held the championship.)	Combs defeated Penny Mitchell to win the vacant championship.	
12	Bambi	1994	N/A	N/A	1	(Note: The exact date that Bambi won the championship is unknown, therefore, it is unknown for how many days she held the championship.)		
13	Peggy Lee Leather	1994	N/A	N/A	1	(Note: The exact date that Leather won the championship is unknown, therefore, it is unknown for how many days she held the championship.)		
14	Bambi	July 26, 1994	NWA TV tapings	East Ridge, TN	2	(Note: The exact date that Bambi lost the championship is unknown, therefore, it is unknown for how many days she held the championship.)		
15	Malia Hosaka	May 9, 1996	Live event	Johnson City, TN	1	1	Hosaka defeated Debbie Combs, who continued to defend the championship despite Bambi being recognized as the champion by Jim Crockett Promotions.	
16	Debbie Combs	May 10, 1996	Live event	Fall Branch, TN	3	(Note: The exact date that Combs lost the championship is unknown, other than it happened in October 1996, which means the title reign lasted between 144 and 174 days.)		
—	Vacated	October 1996	—	—	—	—	Debbie Combs was stripped of the championship.	
17	Strawberry Fields	October 14, 2000	NWA 52nd Anniversary Show	Nashville, TN	1	(Note: The exact date that Fields vacated the championship is unknown, other than it happened in November 2000, which means the title reign lasted between 18 and 47 days.)	Fields defeated Leilani Kai to win the vacant championship.	
—	Vacated	November 2000	—	—	—	—	Strawberry Fields vacated the championship due to an injury.	
18	Madison	August 23, 2002	Live event	Surrey, British Columbia, Canada	1	64	Madison defeated Bam Bam Bambi to win the vacant championship.	
19	Char Starr	October 26, 2002	NWA 54th Anniversary Show	Corpus Christi, TX	1	41		
20	Madison	December 6, 2002	Live event	Port Coquitlam, BC	2	96		
21	Leilani Kai	March 12, 2003	NWA:TNA Weekly PPV #36	Nashville, TN	1	465		
—	Vacated	June 19, 2004	—	—	—	—	Leilani Kai was stripped after several no-shows	
22	Kiley McLean	June 19, 2004	Live event	Richmond, VA	1	308	McLean defeated Kameo to win the vacant championship.	
23	Lexie Fyfe	April 23, 2005	Live event	Richmond, VA	1	168		
24	Christie Ricci	October 8, 2005	NWA 57th Anniversary Show	Nashville, TN	1	476	This was a three-way match, also involving Tasha Simone.	
25	MsChif	January 27, 2007	Live event	Lebanon, TN	1	98		
26	Amazing Kong	May 5, 2007	Live event	Streamwood, IL	1	358		
27	MsChif	April 27, 2008	Live event	Cape Girardeau, MO	2	818		
28	Tasha Simone	July 24, 2010	House show	Lebanon, TN	1	70		
29	La Reina de Corazones	October 2, 2010	Live event	Altus, OK	1	35		
—	Vacated	November 6, 2010	Live event	Lebanon, TN	—	—	La Reina de Corazones was stripped of the championship after refusing to defend it.	
30	Tasha Simone	November 6, 2010	Live event	Lebanon, TN	2	365	Simone defeated Rachel to win the vacant championship.	
31	Tiffany Roxx	November 6, 2011	Live event	Lebanon, TN	1	49	This was a no disqualification match.	
32	Tasha Simone	December 25, 2011	Live event	Lebanon, TN	3	300	This was a steel cage match.	
33	Kacee Carlisle	October 20, 2012	Live event	Lebanon, TN	1	462		
34	Barbi Hayden	January 25, 2014	Live event	Cypress, TX	1	378		
35	Santana Garrett	February 7, 2015	Live event	Plant City, FL	1	314		
36	Amber Gallows	December 18, 2015	Live event	Sherman, TX	1	273	This was a four-way elimination match, also involving Bree Ann and Nikki Knight. Gallows won the championship by lastly eliminating Santana Garrett.	
National Wrestling Alliance/Lightning One Inc.
37	Jazz	September 16, 2016	Live event	Sherman, TX	1	948	This was a three-way match, also involving Christi Jaynes.	
—	Vacated	April 22, 2019	—	—	—	—	Jazz vacated the championship due to medical and personal reasons.	
38	Allysin Kay	April 27, 2019	Crockett Cup	Concord, NC	1	272	Kay defeated Santana Garrett to win the vacant championship.	
39	Thunder Rosa	January 24, 2020	Hard Times	Atlanta, GA	1	277		
40	Serena Deeb	October 27, 2020	UWN Primetime Live	Long Beach, CA	1	222	Deeb defended the title on October 22 on an All Elite Wrestling (AEW) Dynamite taping, five days prior to winning the title. The match aired on October 28, 2020, the day after she won the title.	
41	Kamille	June 6, 2021	When Our Shadows Fall	Atlanta, GA	1	812		
42	Kenzie Paige	August 27, 2023	NWA 75th Anniversary Show	St. Louis, MO	1	720		
43	Natalia Markova	August 16, 2025	NWA 77th Anniversary Show	Huntington, NY	1	231	Aired on tape delay on November 11, 2025 as a special episode of Powerrr.	
44	Tiffany Nieves	April 4, 2026	Crockett Cup	Forney, TX	1	223+	This was Nieves' Burke Invitational Gauntlet cash-in match Aired on tape delay May 16, 2026 as a special episode of Powerrr.	

== Combined reigns ==
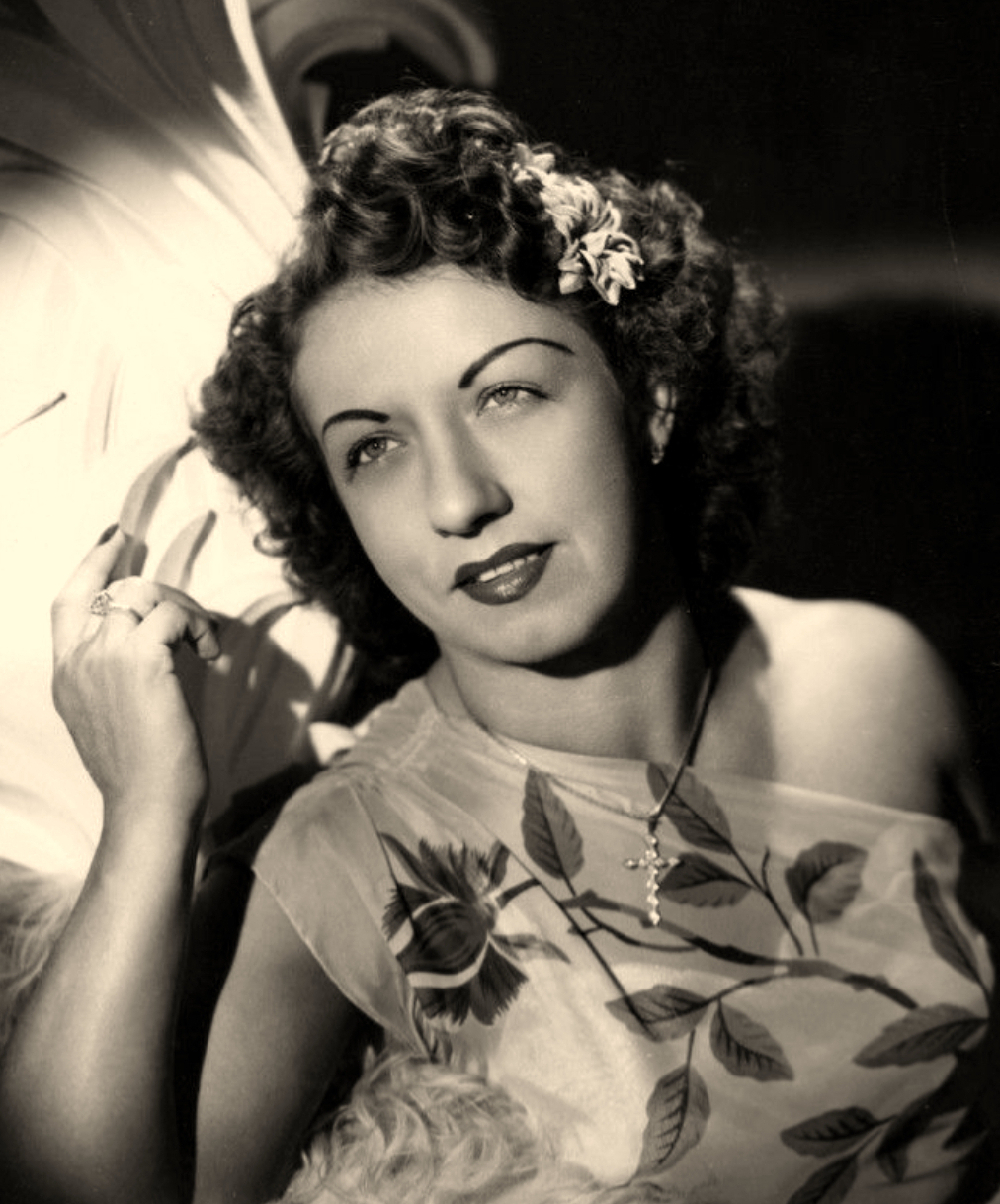
Inaugural champion Mildred Burke

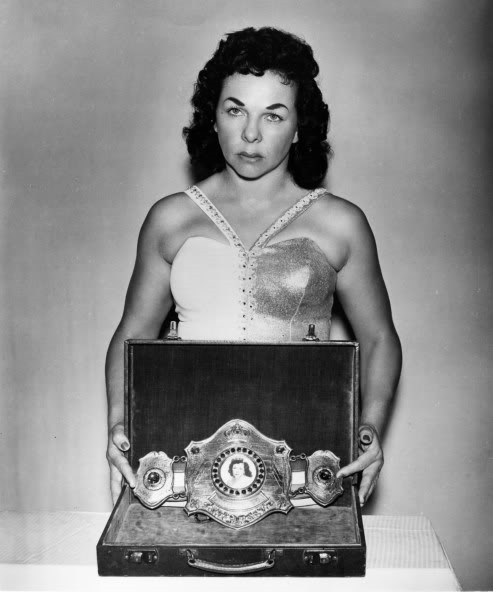
Four-time and longest reigning champion The Fabulous Moolah

†	Indicates the current champion.
¤	The exact length of a title reign is uncertain; the combined length may not be correct.
N/A	The exact length of a title reign is too uncertain to calculate.

Rank	Wrestler	No. of Reigns	Combined Days
1	The Fabulous Moolah	4^{(5)}	9,925¤
2	Debbie Combs	2	3,461¤
3	Jazz	1	948
4	MsChif	2	916
5	Kamille	1	812
6	June Byers	1	760¤
7	Tasha Simone	3	735
8	Kenzie Paige	1	720
9	Christie Ricci	1	476
10	Leilani Kai	1	465
11	Kacee Carlisle	1	462
12	Barbi Hayden	1	378
13	Amazing Kong	1	358
14	Kiley McLean	1	318
15	Santana Garrett	1	314
16	Thunder Rosa	1	277
17	Amber Gallows	1	273
18	Allysin Kay	1	272
19	Natalia Markova	1	231
20	Tiffany Nieves †	1	223+
21	Serena Deeb	1	222
22	Lexie Fyfe	1	168
23	Madison	2	160
24	Tiffany Roxx	1	50
25	Char Starr	1	41
26	La Reina de Corazones	1	35
27	Yukiko Tomoe	1	23
28	Strawberry Fields	1	18–47¤
29	Bette Boucher	1	16
30	Evelyn Stevens	1	1
31	Malia Hosaka	1	1
32	Bambi	2	N/A
33	Mildred Burke	1	N/A
34	Peggy Lee Leather	1	N/A

== See also ==
- List of National Wrestling Alliance championships
- World Women's Championship (disambiguation)

Sporting positions
Preceded by Women's World Championship	NWA's top women’s championship 1950–present	Succeeded by WWE Women's Championship
