= Ann Casey =

American professional wrestler (1938–2021)

Personal information
- Born: Lucille Ann Casey; September 29, 1938 Saraland, Alabama, U.S.
- Died: March 1, 2021 (aged 82)
- Education: University of South Alabama
- Children: 1

Professional wrestling career
- Ring name(s): Ann Casey; Panther Girl; Lucille Ann Casey; Lucille O'Casey
- Billed height: 5 ft 8 in (173 cm)
- Billed weight: 134 lb (61 kg)
- Trained by: The Fabulous Moolah
- Debut: 1962
- Retired: 1990

Lucille Ann Casey (September 29, 1938 – March 1, 2021) was an American professional wrestler, better known by her ring name Ann Casey, or Panther Girl.

== Early life ==
Casey was born in Saraland, Alabama, one of nine children to John and Viola Casey. John was of Irish ancestry; Viola claimed American Indian Blood—less than one eighth Creek Indian. After the family moved to a Mississippi cotton farm, Casey attended school at Agricola, Mississippi. Once she graduated, she married and had a son, but soon divorced.

== Professional wrestling career ==
In 1962, while working at the ticket counter for a professional wrestling promotion, she met The Fabulous Moolah, who offered to train Casey to wrestle. Casey soon decided to take Moolah up on her offer and moved to South Carolina to train. Her first match was a tag team match that pitted her and Judy Grable against Rita Cortez and Brenda Scott that fall. Casey also wrestled Miss Brenda in a two out of three falls match for the opening of a December 1962 card also featuring Fred Blassie. While working under Moolah, Casey traveled all around the United States; she was also one of the first women to ever compete in a tag team match in the state of Hawaii. While in Hawaii, Casey fell in love with a local champion surfer and took a brief hiatus from wrestling.

Two years later, Casey returned to the continental United States and professional wrestling. She worked for promoters Vince McMahon, Sr., Vince McMahon, Jr., and Leroy McGuirk. During this time, she wrestled Donna Christanello at Madison Square Garden in New York. In 1964, she had a match that pitted she and Penny Banner against Cora Combs and Kathy O'Brien. The following year, she defeated Kay Noble in a match, but was defeated in another match by Bette Boucher. She was also defeated by Mae Young in a 1968 NWA United States Women's Championship match.

With Vivian Vachon as her partner, Casey defeated Donna Christanello and Cora Combs in a 1970 match. In 1972, Casey discovered that her son had gotten involved in drug trafficking with a truck driver, and after she forced him to stop, the truck driver shot her six times. Although the doctors told her that her professional wrestling career was over, Casey was able to wrestle again within several months. In 1974, Moolah offered to let Casey win the USA Women's Wrestling Championship from her, and Casey was subsequently never defeated for the belt. Later that year in December, Casey also won the vacated NWA United States Women's Championship by defeating Toni Rose in a match. She held the championship for approximately four years before losing it to Joyce Grable. Meanwhile, wrestling magazine Pro Wrestling Illustrated recognized Casey as the "Girl Wrestler of the Year" in 1975.

== Retirement ==
Casey remarried and had a daughter in the 1970s. She still occasionally wrestled, and from 1980 to 1985, she worked for the Mississippi Forestry Commission. Afterward, she received her paralegal license, as well as a bachelor's degree in criminal justice with a minor in psychology from the University of South Alabama. After divorcing her second husband, she began working as a bail bondsman. Subsequently, she opened a restaurant and drove trucks.

Casey's last match occurred in 1990, when she defeated Judy Grable to retain the USA Women's Championship. In 2004, she was honored by the Cauliflower Alley Club, an association for retired professional wrestlers.

After retiring from the ring, Ann Casey wrote an autobiography titled ‘Autobiography of professional woman wrestler, Ann Casey: The Lady, The Life, The Legend.’ The book, made available as print-on-demand, comprises more than three volumes and is over 1,000 pages long. A shorter adaptation of Casey's autobiography appeared in Brooklyn-based sports magazine Victory Journal in December 2014 under the title "The Legend of Panther Girl", with the tagline "She fought to win. They shot to kill."

== Death ==
Casey suffered a heart attack in 2005, and was hospitalized in later years. She died on March 1, 2021, at the age of 82.

== Championships and accomplishments ==
- Cauliflower Alley Club
  - Honoree (2004)
- National Wrestling Alliance
  - NWA United States Women's Championship (1 time)
- Pro Wrestling Illustrated
  - Girl Wrestler of the Year (1975)
- Other titles
  - USA Women's Wrestling Championship (1 time)
  - Southern States Ladies Championship
  - Mississippi State Ladies Championship
