= Sweet Georgia Brown (wrestler) =

American professional wrestler (1938–1989)

Personal information
- Born: Susie Mae McCoy; December 22, 1938 Cayce, South Carolina, US
- Died: July 25, 1989 (aged 50)

Professional wrestling career
- Ring name(s): Sweet Georgia Brown; Black Orchid; African Lioness
- Trained by: Fabulous Moolah; Buddy Lee
- Debut: 1958
- Retired: 1972

Susie Mae McCoy (December 22, 1938 – July 25, 1989), better known by her ring name Sweet Georgia Brown, was an African-American female professional wrestler who was recognized as the first Black woman to win a title in professional wrestling history.

== Wrestling career ==
Brown was trained by the Fabulous Moolah and Buddy Lee in South Carolina. She made her wrestling debut in 1958. On October 21, 1963, Brown made history when she defeated Nell Stewart for the NWA Texas Women's Championship becoming the first black woman to win a title in wrestling history. During her career she wrestled in Florida, Calgary, Mid-Atlantic, Alabama and Hawaii. She retired from wrestling in 1972.

== Death ==
Brown died from breast cancer at 50 on July 25, 1989.

== Legacy ==
In 2019, she was featured on Vice's Dark Side of the Ring episode on the Fabulous Moolah. Her son, Michael mentions his mother's life and the abuse she suffered in wrestling.

One of the most notorious accusations is from the family of Sweet Georgia Brown (Susie Mae McCoy), who was trained by Moolah and her husband, Buddy Lee. The Columbia Free Times reported allegations made by her daughter in 2006, in which she said her mother told her that she was often raped, given drugs, and made an addict in an intentional attempt by Ellison and Lee to control her.

Michael McCoy, Sweet Georgia Brown's son, refuted allegations made by his sister, stating that she has an agenda and that the allegations are false. However, on the Dark Side of the Ring episode about The Fabulous Moolah, Michael McCoy stated that she was indeed made to have sex with paying promoters. Michael also found out his biological father is Buddy Lee.

== Championships and accomplishments ==
- National Wrestling Alliance
  - NWA Texas Women's Championship (1 time)
