= Cora Livingston =

American professional wrestler

Personal information
- Born: 1887 or 1889 Buffalo, New York, US
- Died: April 23, 1957 Boston, Massachusetts, US
- Spouse: Paul Bowser (m. 1913)

Professional wrestling career
- Billed height: 5 ft 5 in (1.65 m)
- Billed weight: 138 lb (63 kg)
- Trained by: Dan McLeod; Dr. Benjamin Roller; Laura Bennett; Paul Bowser
- Debut: 1905
- Retired: 1925 or 1935

Cora B. Bowser (1887/1889 – April 22, 1957), better known by the ring name Cora Livingston (also spelled as Livingstone) was an American professional wrestler. She is the first women's world champion in professional wrestling history.

== Early life ==
Cora Livingston's parents died when she was young. Therefore, Livingston was placed in a convent school where she was raised by the nuns.

== Professional wrestling career ==
Hailing from Buffalo, New York, Livingston began wrestling with the circus at age 16, Where her first match to be documented took place on March 19, 1906, at the Lafayette Theatre in Buffalo. She defeated Laura Bennett in 1910 to be the "first to be recognized as Women's Champion of the World". As Livingston toured throughout the United States and Canada, she managed to build herself as a credible champion, as she faced the opponents like Bessie Farrar and Celina Pontos. On September 7, 1910, Livingston faced a local competitor May Nelson. They wrestled around 13 minutes until the police had to stop the match, due to fans who tried to storm into the ring as Livingston being rough with Nelson. The match between the two resumed two days after that incident, where Livingston suffered her first loss in her wrestling career, although the match wasn't for Livingston's championship. Livingston retained her championship title until her retirement. In her later years, she mentored and coached Mildred Burke.

== Personal life and death ==
Livingston married a fellow wrestler Paul Bowser in 1913. After her retirement from professional wrestling, Livingston helped her husband run the New England wrestling territory. Livingston died in Boston on April 22, 1957.

== Championships and accomplishments ==
- Independent
  - Women's World Championship (1 time, first)
  - Women's World Lightweight championship (1 time)
- Greater Buffalo Sports Hall of Fame
  - Class of 2022
- Women's Wrestling Hall of Fame
  - Class of 2023
