= Marva Scott (wrestler) =

American professional wrestler

Personal information
- Born: Marva Aniece Wingo; November 21, 1937 Decatur, Georgia, U.S.
- Died: August 15, 2003 (aged 65) Columbus, Ohio, U.S.
- Cause of death: Cancer
- Spouse: Clesson H. Goodwin
- Children: 4
- Relatives: Babs Wingo; Ethel Johnson

Professional wrestling career
- Ring name(s): Marva Scott; Marva Wingo; Martha Scott; Marva Johnson; Mary Scott; African Black Cat
- Billed from: Detroit, Michigan
- Debut: 1954
- Retired: 1979

Marva Aniece Goodwin (née Wingo; November 21, 1937 – August 15, 2003), better known by the ring name Marva Scott, was among the first Black female professional wrestlers in the United States. She began wrestling in the early 1950s and her first reported match happened in 1954. With her older sisters, Babs Wingo and Ethel Johnson, she was part of the first Black trio sister team. Marva Scott was posthumously inducted into the Women’s Wrestling Hall of Fame in 2023.

== Professional wrestling career ==
Scott began her career in the early 1950s at the age of 16. She was promoted as Babs Wingo's sister, often in tag team bouts against Ethel Johnson.

At one point, Scott became a bleach blonde while wrestling as "The African Black Cat". Scott also tag-teamed with her sister Ethel, and together, they became tag team champions.

Wrestling historian Jim Melby called Scott one of the great "teenage sensations" during the "Golden Age of Wrestling" ranking her among the top six female wrestlers of the era.

Scott retired in 1979. WWE named Marva 51 of the best wrestlers of all time in April 2021.

== Personal life ==
Scott was born Marva Aniece Wingo in Decatur, Georgia, to Gladys Chase and Clifford Wingo on November 21, 1937. Scott’s sisters, Babs Wingo and Ethel Johnson, were also professional wrestlers.

Scott was married to Clesson H. Goodwin and had four children. Following her retirement, Scott was employed at the Training Institute of Central Ohio.

Scott died of cancer on August 15, 2003, in Columbus, Ohio.

== Championships and accomplishments ==
- Clete Kaufman Promotions
  - Ohio Women's Tag Team Championship (1 time) – with Ethel Johnson
- Women's Wrestling Hall of Fame
  - Class of 2023
