= WWWA World Single Championship =

Professional wrestling women's championship

- Last design of the title (1990s - 2006)

Details
- Promotion: All Japan Women's Pro-Wrestling (AJW)
- Date established: January 28, 1937
- Date retired: March 26, 2006

Other name
- WWWA World Heavyweight Championship
Statistics
- First champion: Mildred Burke
- Final champion: Nanae Takahashi
- Most reigns: Jumbo Miyamoto (5 reigns)
- Longest reign: Bull Nakano (1,057 days)
- Shortest reign: Lioness Asuka and Nanae Takahashi (<1 days); Bambi Ball (0-4 days)

The WWWA World Single Championship (WWWA世界シングル王座, WWWA sekai shinguru ōza) was the top singles women's professional wrestling championship in All Japan Women's Pro-Wrestling (AJW) from 1970 until it closed in 2006. It was also known in Pro Wrestling Illustrated and other London Publishing wrestling magazines as the All-Japan Women's International Championship. The title was descended from the original Women's World Championship, which Mildred Burke won in 1937.

On September 2, 2017, the title was revived for one day by former AJW wrestlers Kumiko Maekawa, Manami Toyota, Nanae Takahashi and Yumiko Hotta at an independent event produced by Hotta. The soon-to-retire Toyota then defeated Hotta and was awarded the title belt.

== Title history ==
Key
No.	Overall reign number
Reign	Reign number for the specific champion
Days	Number of days held

No.	Champion	Championship change			Reign statistics		Notes	Ref.
No.	Champion	Date	Event	Location	Reign	Days	Notes	Ref.
1	Mildred Burke	January 1937	Live Event	N/A	1		Burke recognized herself as the first and still-undefeated World Women's Champion, even after the National Wrestling Alliance had ceased to recognize her as champion after officials called her two out of three falls encounter with June Byers on August 20, 1954 in Atlanta, Georgia which never had a finish. Burke returned to the promotion she founded, World Women's Wrestling Association and continued to defend the championship.	
—	Vacated	1956	—	—	—	—	The championship was vacated after Mildred Burke retired from wrestling.	
2	Marie Vagnone	August 1970	Live Event	Los Angeles, CA	1		Vagnone won a tournament to win the vacant championship.	
3	Aiko Kyo	October 15, 1970	Live Event	Tokyo, Japan	1	511	This was a two-out-of-three falls match.	
4	Jean Antoine	March 9, 1972	Live Event	Ōtawara, Tochigi, Japan	1	6		
5	Aiko Kyo	March 15, 1972	Live Event	Nagoya, Aichi, Japan	2	42	This was a two-out-of-three falls match.	
6	Sandy Starr	April 26, 1972	Live Event	Osaka, Japan	1	28		
7	Aiko Kyo	May 24, 1972	Live Event	Fukuoka, Japan	3	38		
8	Sarah Lee	July 1, 1972	Live Event	Tokyo, Japan	1	25		
9	Miyoko Hoshino	July 26, 1972	Live Event	Kasukabe, Saitama, Japan	1	293		
10	Sandy Parker	May 15, 1973	Live Event	Chōshi, Chiba, Japan	1	56		
11	Miyoko Hoshino	July 10, 1973	Live Event	Kasama, Ibaraki, Japan	2	63		
12	Jumbo Miyamoto	September 11, 1973	Live Event	Tokyo, Japan	1	172		
13	Bambi Ball	March 2, 1974	Live Event	Kawasaki, Kanagawa, Japan	1	0 – 4		
—	Vacated	March 1974	—	—	—	—	The championship was vacated after Bambi Ball suffered an injury.	
14	Jumbo Miyamoto	March 6, 1974	Live Event	Maebashi, Gunma, Japan	2	26	Miyamoto defeated Jane O'Brien to win the vacant championship.	
15	Jackie West	April 1, 1974	Live Event	Kobe, Hyōgo, Japan	1	23	This was a two-out-of-three falls match.	
16	Jumbo Miyamoto	April 24, 1974	Live Event	Kumamoto, Japan	3	329		
17	Mach Fumiake	March 19, 1975	Live Event	Tokyo, Japan	1	14		
18	Jumbo Miyamoto	April 2, 1975	Live Event	Osaka, Japan	4	348		
19	Mariko Akagi	March 15, 1976	Live Event	Tokyo, Japan	1	33		
20	Jumbo Miyamoto	April 17, 1976	Live Event	Toyokawa, Aichi, Japan	5	52		
21	Maki Ueda	June 8, 1976	Live Event	Tottori, Japan	1	175		
22	Mariko Akagi	November 30, 1976	Live Event	Tokyo, Japan	1	241	This was a two-out-of-three falls match.	
23	Maki Ueda	July 29, 1977	Live Event	Tokyo, Japan	2	95		
24	Jackie Sato	November 1, 1977	Live Event	Tokyo, Japan	1	637		
25	Monster Ripper	July 31, 1979	Live Event	Tokyo, Japan	1	44		
26	Jackie Sato	September 13, 1979	Live Event	Tokyo, Japan	2	184		
27	Monster Ripper	March 15, 1980	Live Event	Kawasaki, Kanagawa, Japan	2	146		
—	Vacated	August 8, 1980	—	—	—	—	The championship was vacated after a match with Jackie Sato.	
28	Jackie Sato	December 16, 1980	Live Event	Tokyo, Japan	3	71	Sato defeated Nancy Kumi to win the vacant championship.	
29	Rimi Yokota	February 25, 1981	Live Event	Yokohama, Kanagawa, Japan	1	801		
30	La Galáctica	May 7, 1983	Live Event	Kawasaki, Kanagawa, Japan	1	25		
31	Jaguar Yokota	June 1, 1983	Live Event	Ōmiya-ku, Saitama, Japan	2	914 – 925	Yokota is formerly known as Rimi Yokota.	
—	Vacated	December 1985	—	—	—	—	The championship was vacated due to Jaguar Yokota retiring.	
32	Devil Masami	December 12, 1985	Live Event	Tokyo, Japan	1	254	Masami defeated Dump Matsumoto to win the vacant championship. Masami also defended the All Pacific Championship.	
33	Yukari Omori	August 23, 1986	Live Event	Kawasaki, Kanagawa, Japan	1	423		
34	Chigusa Nagayo	October 20, 1987	War Dream	Tokyo, Japan	1	310	This match was also for the All Pacific Championship.	
35	Lioness Asuka	August 25, 1988	Live Event	Kawasaki, Kanagawa, Japan	1	<1	Asuka won the championship by forfeit due to Chigusa Nagayo being injured.	
—	Vacated	August 25, 1988	—	—	—	—	The championship was vacated after Lioness Asuka refused the championship.	
36	Lioness Asuka	January 29, 1989	Live Event	Tokyo, Japan	2	171	Asuka defeated Chigusa Nagayo to win the vacant championship.	
—	Vacated	July 19, 1989	—	—	—	—	The championship was vacated after Lioness Asuka retiring.	
37	Bull Nakano	January 4, 1990	Live Event	Tokyo, Japan	1	1,057	Nakano defeated Mitsuko Nishiwaki in a tournament final to win the vacant championship.	
38	Aja Kong	November 26, 1992	Dream Rush in Kawasaki	Kawasaki, Kanagawa, Japan	1	850		
39	Manami Toyota	March 26, 1995	Wrestling Queendom Victory	Yokohama, Kanagawa, Japan	1	93		
40	Aja Kong	June 27, 1995	Zenjo Movement - Day 40	Sapporo, Japan	2	64		
41	Dynamite Kansai	August 30, 1995	WWWA Champions Night Osaka Queen's Holy Night	Osaka, Japan	1	96		
42	Manami Toyota	December 4, 1995	Monday Night Sensation	Tokyo, Japan	2	370		
43	Kyoko Inoue	December 8, 1996	Kokugikan Chojoden The Real Earnest	Tokyo, Japan	1	154		
—	Vacated	May 11, 1997	Zenjo Transformation - Day 8	Nagoya, Aichi, Japan	—	—	Kyoko Inoue voluntarily vacated the championship after a match against Kaoru Ito ended in a time limit draw.	
44	Kyoko Inoue	June 17, 1997	Zenjo Transformation - Day 35	Sapporo, Japan	2	64	Inoue defeated Kaoru Ito to win the vacant championship.	
45	Yumiko Hotta	August 20, 1997	Budokan Queens - Brightness	Tokyo, Japan	1	213		
46	Shinobu Kandori	March 21, 1998	Live Event	Tokyo, Japan	1	354	This was a title vs. title match, in which Kandori also defended the LLPW Championship.	
47	Yumiko Hotta	March 10, 1999	Live Event	Tokyo, Japan	2	123	This was a knockout match.	
48	Kyoko Inoue	July 11, 1999	Odaiba W Explosion - Day 2	Tokyo, Japan	3	103		
49	Yumiko Hotta	October 22, 1999	Neo Ladies Live in Hakata	Fukuoka, Japan	3	74		
50	Manami Toyota	January 4, 2000	Live Event	Tokyo, Japan	3	257		
51	Kaoru Ito	September 17, 2000	Zenjo Stroke	Tokyo, Japan	1	525		
52	Manami Toyota	February 24, 2002	Zenjo Turbulence	Yokohama, Kanagawa, Japan	4	132		
53	Kaoru Ito	July 6, 2002	Japan Grand Prix - Day 15: The Queendom of WWWA	Tokyo, Japan	2	106		
54	Momoe Nakanishi	October 20, 2002	Tag League the Best - Day 2 Real All-Womanism Dream Explosion: Kawasaki Part 1	Kawasaki, Kanagawa, Japan	1	203		
55	Ayako Hamada	May 11, 2003	35th Anniversary - The Future	Yokohama, Kanagawa, Japan	1	238		
56	Amazing Kong	January 4, 2004	The Legend of Women's Pro Wrestling - Day 2	Tokyo, Japan	1	119		
57	Ayako Hamada	May 2, 2004	New Wave - Day 6	Tokyo, Japan	2	224		
58	Nanae Takahashi	December 12, 2004	Rising Generation Special in Kawasaki	Kawasaki, Kanagawa, Japan	1	17		
—	Vacated	December 29, 2004	—	—	—	—	The championship was vacated after Nanae Takahashi suffered an injury.	
59	Kumiko Maekawa	January 3, 2005	Dead or Alive - Day 1	Tokyo, Japan	1	447	Maekawa defeated Ayako Hamada to win the vacant championship.	
60	Nanae Takahashi	March 26, 2006	Kumiko Maekawa Retirement Show	Tokyo, Japan	2	<1		
—	Deactivated	March 26, 2006	—	—	—	—	The championship retired when AJW closed.	

== Combined reigns ==
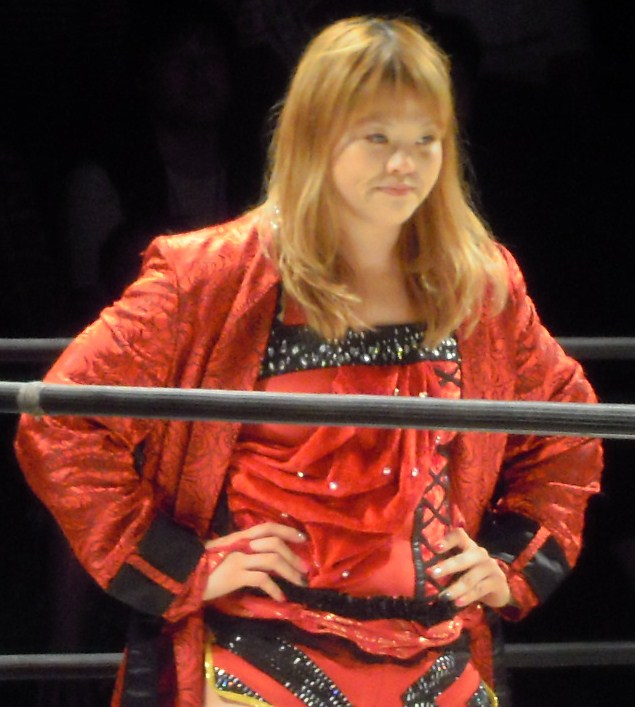
Nanae Takahashi was the final WWWA World Single Champion

¤	The exact length of a title reign is uncertain; the combined length may not be correct.

Rank	Wrestler	No. of Reigns	Combined Days
1	Mildred Burke	1	7,238
2	Jaguar Yokota/Rimi Yokota	2	1,715 – 1,726¤
3	Bull Nakano	1	1,057
4	Jumbo Miyamoto	5	927
5	Aja Kong	2	914
6	Jackie Sato	3	892
7	Manami Toyota	4	852
8	Kaoru Ito	2	631
9	Aiko Kyo	3	591
10	Ayako Hamada	2	462
11	Kumiko Maekawa	1	447
12	Yukari Omori	1	423
13	Yumiko Hotta	3	410
14	Miyoko Hoshino	2	356
15	Shinobu Kandori	1	354
16	Kyoko Inoue	3	321
17	Chigusa Nagayo	1	310
18	Mariko Akagi	2	274
19	Maki Ueda	2	270
20	Devil Masami	1	254
21	Momoe Nakanishi	2	203
22	Monster Ripper	2	190
23	Lioness Asuka	2	171
24	Amazing Kong	1	119
25	Dynamite Kansai	1	96
26	Marie Vagnone	1	60
27	Sandy Parker	1	56
28	Sandy Starr	1	28
29	La Galactica	1	25
30	Sarah Lee	1	25
31	Jackie West	1	23
32	Nanae Takahashi	2	17
33	Mach Fumiake	1	14
34	Jean Antone	1	6
35	Bambi Ball	1	0 – 5¤

== See also ==
- List of professional wrestling promotions in Japan
- List of women's wrestling promotions
- Professional wrestling in Japan
- Women's World Championship
- World of Stardom Championship
