= Bette Boucher =

American retired professional wrestler

Personal information
- Born: Barbara Boucher; July 29, 1943 (age 82) Webster, Massachusetts, U.S.
- Children: 4

Professional wrestling career
- Ring name(s): Bette Boutcher; Betty Boutcher
- Billed height: 5 ft 0 in (152 cm)
- Billed weight: 110 lb (50 kg)
- Billed from: Worcester, Massachusetts
- Trained by: The Fabulous Moolah
- Debut: 1962
- Retired: 1970

Barbara Ellison (née Barbara Boucher, born July 29, 1943) is an American retired professional wrestler, better known by her ring name, Bette Boucher.

== Early life ==
Boucher was born in the small town Webster, Massachusetts on July 29, 1943, one of seven children born to parents of French descent. While attending high school, she excelled in baseball and track and field. As a young girl, she became a fan of professional wrestling. After befriending professional wrestler Pat Patterson, he introduced her to The Fabulous Moolah, who agreed to train her despite misgivings about her small stature.

== Professional wrestling career ==
In 1962, Boucher enrolled in The Fabulous Moolah's professional wrestling school in Columbia, South Carolina, training for six months before making her debut. She was given the ring name "Bette" by The Fabulous Moolah to appear more exotic. Her first bout was for Jim Crockett Promotions in North Carolina, losing to Penny Banner.

After wrestling for two years, Boucher joined the Minneapolis, Minnesota-based American Wrestling Association.

In the late-1960s, Boucher's sister Shirley began wrestling under the ring name "Rita Boucher". The sisters spent two years as a tag team before Shirley retired due to family commitments.

Boucher defeated The Fabulous Moolah to win the NWA World Women's Championship on September 17, 1966. The Fabulous Moolah regained the championship from her one-month later. As The Fabulous Moolah was billed as having held the championship uninterrupted for decades, title reigns such as this were not always recognized.

Boucher retired from professional wrestling in 1970 to start a family.

== Personal life ==
Boucher married in 1970. She and her husband had four children before divorcing in 1992.

== Championships and accomplishments ==
- National Wrestling Alliance
  - NWA World Women's Championship (1 time)
