= Yukiko Tomoe =

Japanese wrestler

Personal information
- Born: November 1, 1935 (age 90) Utsunomiya, Tochigi, Japan

Professional wrestling career
- Ring name: Yukiko Tomoe
- Billed height: 170 cm (5 ft 7 in)
- Debut: 1955
- Retired: 1970

Yukiko Tomoe (巴 ゆき子, Tomoe Yukiko, born November 1, 1935) is a Japanese retired professional wrestler. She is a former holder of the now-defunct AJW title and the NWA World Women's Championship. She has competed in both Japan and the United States.

Yukiko Tomoe defeated The Fabulous Moolah for the NWA World Women's Championship in Japan on March 10, 1968. She lost the title to Moolah less than a month later, on April 2, 1968.

== Championships and accomplishments ==
- All Japan Women's Pro-Wrestling
  - AGWA International Girls' Championship (1 time)
  - JWPA Japanese Heavyweight Championship (1 time)
  - AJW Hall of Fame
- National Wrestling Alliance
  - NWA World Women's Championship (1 time)
