= Mildred Burke =

American professional wrestler (1915–1989)

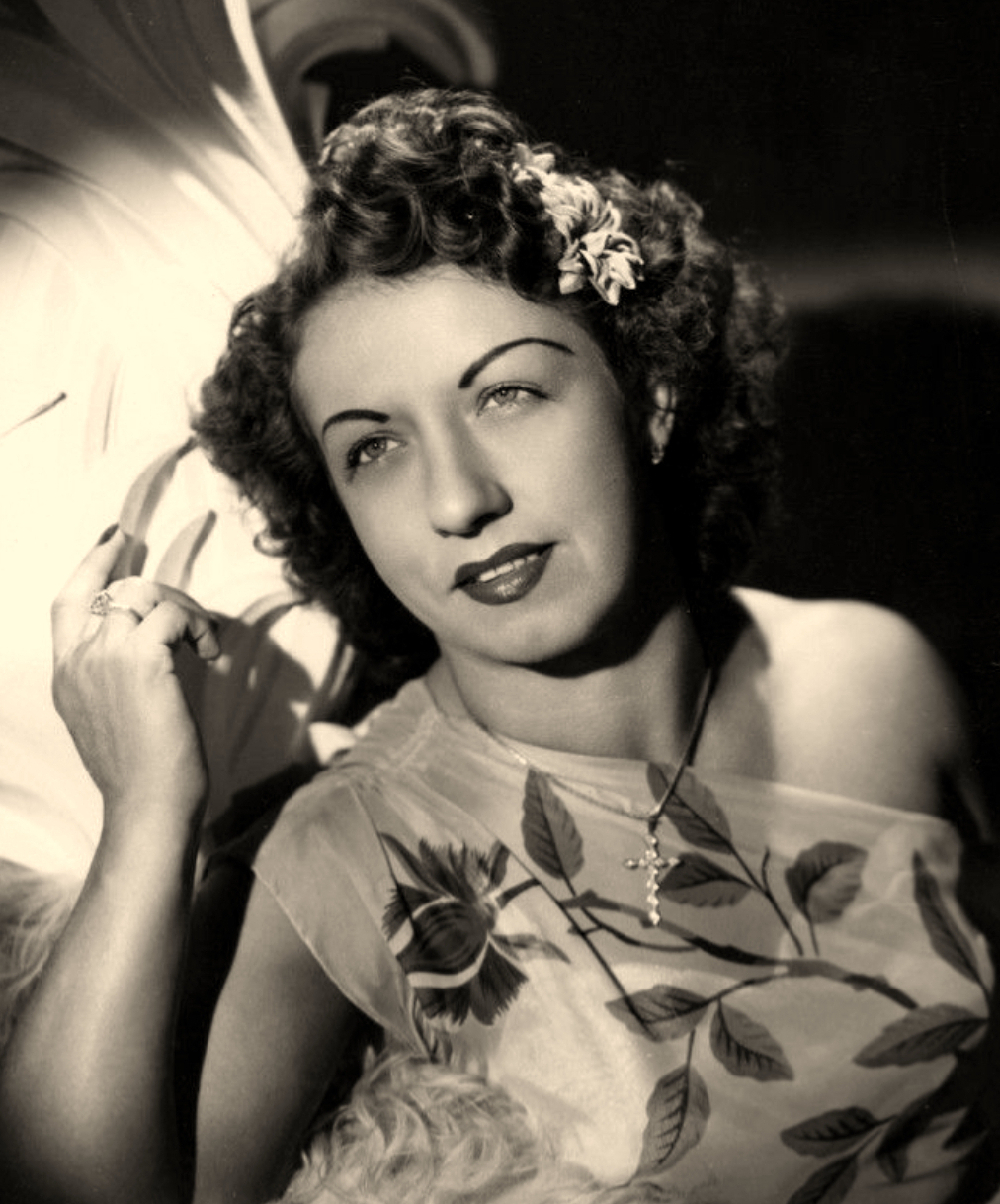
- Burke in 1950

Personal information
- Born: Mildred Bliss; August 5, 1915 Coffeyville, Kansas
- Died: February 18, 1989 (aged 73) Northridge, California, US
- Spouse: Billy Wolfe (−1952)

Professional wrestling career
- Ring name: Mildred Burke
- Billed height: 5 ft 2 in (157 cm)
- Billed weight: 138 lb (63 kg)
- Billed from: Coffeyville, Kansas
- Trained by: Billy Wolfe; Cora Livingston
- Debut: 1935
- Retired: 1956

Mildred Bliss (August 5, 1915 – February 18, 1989), better known by the ring name Mildred Burke, was an American professional wrestler. She is overall a three-time women's world champion under different incarnations and recognitions.

Burke's heyday lasted from the mid-1930s to the mid-1950s, when she held the NWA World Women's Championship for almost twenty years. Burke started out in 1935, wrestling men at carnivals. She was managed by her second husband, promoter Billy Wolfe. She is a charter member of WWE Hall of Fame's Legacy Wing, Professional Wrestling Hall of Fame, Women's Wrestling Hall of Fame, and the Wrestling Observer Newsletter Hall of Fame.

== Early life ==
Born Mildred Bliss on August 5, 1915, in Coffeyville, Kansas, at age 15 she dropped out of school and began to work as a waitress on the Zuni Indian Reservation in Gallup, New Mexico. She lived there for three years, before leaving for Kansas City after agreeing to marry her boyfriend. He took her to a professional wrestling event, which sparked her interest in the sport. Burke was pregnant at the time. She worked as a stenographer prior to her wrestling career.

== Professional wrestling career ==
Prior to wrestling, she was an office stenographer by day, had outstanding muscle development, and was hoping to become a professional wrestler. Locally, Billy Wolfe was training aspiring women professional wrestlers. At first, Wolfe did not want to train Burke and instructed a male wrestler to body slam her, so she would stop asking Wolfe to train her. Burke, however, performed a body slam on the man instead, which resulted in Wolfe agreeing to train her. Wolfe tutored her and realized that she was the prospect for which he was waiting. The close proximity of their training resulted in a relationship and ultimately marriage. Changing her name to Mildred Burke, she defeated Clara Mortensen for the Women's World Championship in January 1937. During this time, Burke was mentored by Cora Livingston.

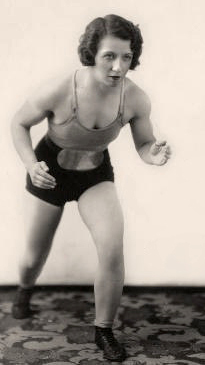
Burke in 1937

In the 1930s, Burke wrestled over 200 men, but only lost to one of them.

Despite the riches that her husband earned as a promoter of women grapplers, there was a dark side to their marriage. On the road, Wolfe acted as a father figure to the women he trained and managed, but he also earned a reputation as a womanizer because he repeatedly cheated on Burke.

=== Split from Billy Wolfe ===
The problems caused by Wolfe's infidelity came to a head in 1952 when Wolfe and Burke separated. Burke found herself frozen out of professional wrestling among all National Wrestling Alliance (NWA) channels. Desperate, Burke decided to consult Jack Pfefer for help. The NWA attempted to reconcile the couple, but the only agreed upon solution was that one would sell out to the other. Burke volunteered to sell to Wolfe for Burke's Attractions, Inc., which went into bankruptcy and into the hands of receiver James Hoff of Columbus. Eight months later, Hoff named Wolfe as administrator and was approved by Franklin County Judge William Bryant. A memorandum dated August 20, 1953, was circulated by Wolfe, in which he boldly announced that he was the booker for Burke and her stable of 27 wrestlers. The claim was disputed by Burke on August 26, 1953, stating that the issue would be settled in the courts. It was emphasized that her contract prohibited Wolfe from competing in wrestling and was in breach of the binding agreement. She consulted with Leroy McGuirk and hoped that she would be vindicated by the NWA at their September 1953 meeting in Chicago.

=== Dealings with the NWA ===
Burke faced many obstacles, as women were banned from yearly NWA conferences, and this diminished the importance of women in professional wrestling. An example of the discrimination was evident during the dispute with Wolfe. Burke sat in the lobby of the Blackstone Hotel in Chicago as male dignitaries argued behind closed doors about her future. Wolfe's voice was the only one heard by the membership. In the end, the NWA declined to recognize women's wrestling after the meeting, Wolfe regained his stake, but many women were loyal to Burke and refused to wrestle for Wolfe.

=== Genuine animosity ===
In a letter to NWA members on November 4, 1953, Burke refuted Wolfe's claim that she would wrestle only one woman grappler. She claimed that there were twelve grapplers with whom she would work. Wolfe, however, used his influence to get her frozen from NWA members, and her promising run in the Southeast with Cowboy Luttrall and Paul Jones in 1954 fizzled.

Emotionally exhausted, Burke wrestled Wolfe's daughter-in-law June Byers and there was genuine heat between the two. The match took place on August 20, 1954, in Atlanta. It was a grudge match that quickly became a shoot fight, due to genuine enmity between the two women. Wolfe had the support of the local commission, and he positioned a referee that was friendly to his goals into the match. Burke later admitted that she had given up the legitimate first fall with the intention of competing stronger in the second. The second fall never had a finish. Officials called the match, and Burke left the ring believing that her title was safe because she had not lost two falls. The result was that many in the press stated that Byers had defeated her and the importance of Burke's championship began to diminish.

=== Later career ===
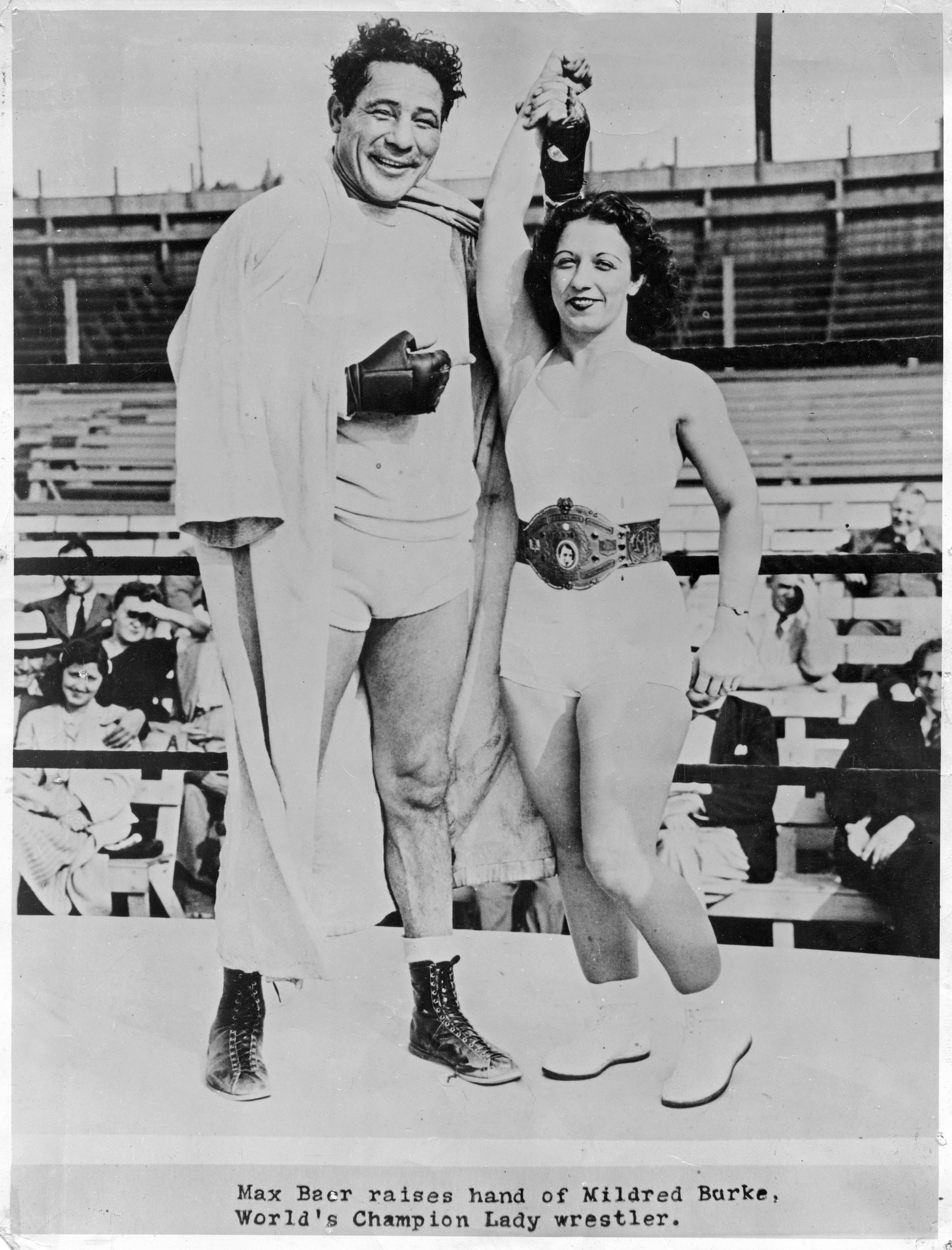
Burke with boxer Max Baer in the 1950s

In the early 1950s, Burke started the World Women's Wrestling Association in Los Angeles, California. She returned to her promotion after her match with Byers, still recognizing herself as the World Women's Champion even after the NWA had recognized rival June Byers as champion since then, and continued to defend it. She vacated the title in 1956, when she retired from professional wrestling. In 1970, the title was revived by All Japan Women's Pro-Wrestling (AJW) as their top prize.

After the tensions with Wolfe and the NWA, Burke traveled with an escort for the rest of her career as a protective measure. She started International Women's Wrestlers Inc. with Bill Newman and the promotion had offices in New York City, San Francisco and Sydney, Australia. These offices served in the dual capacity of booking offices and training centers.

Her efforts to spread women's wrestling internationally reached Japan and brought about the World Wide Women's Wrestling Association (WWWA) and All Japan Women's Pro-Wrestling.

== Personal life and final years ==
In her later years, Burke ran a women's wrestling school in Encino, California. Among her students were WWE Hall of Famer The Fabulous Moolah, who she trained in the 1940s, and Canadian wrestler Rhonda Sing.

In 1974 she acted in the film Below the Belt, released in 1980, she appearing as a wrestling trainer under her own name.

Burke died from a stroke on February 18, 1989, in Northridge, California, and was buried at the Forest Lawn, Hollywood Hills Memorial Park in Los Angeles.

== Legacy ==
Mildred Burke introduced women's wrestling to several countries, including almost every state of the United States, Canada, Cuba, Mexico, and parts of Asia, including Japan, Hong Kong, Macao, and the Philippines. All Japan Women's Pro-Wrestling (AJW) bought the legal rights of the WWWA World Championship from her and later created the WWWA World Tag Team Championship, in 1971 and the All Pacific Championship, in 1977.

In 2002, she was posthumously inducted into the Professional Wrestling Hall of Fame., and in 2016, Burke inducted into the WWE Hall of Fame as a "Legacy" member.

On August 17, 2018, NWA's owner Billy Corgan acquired Burke's original title belt and presented it on August 28, at NWA EmPowerrr. The NWA World Women's Championship is also referred to as "The Burke".

== Other media ==
In 2009, Jeff Leen published a biography of Burke, titled The Queen of the Ring: Sex, Muscles, Diamonds, and the Making of an American Legend. In June 2023 filming began on Queen of the Ring, a biopic of Burke, based on Leen's book. The film was released on March 7, 2025. Canadian actress Emily Bett Rickards portrays Burke in the film.

== Championships and accomplishments ==
- Independent
  - Women's World Championship (2 times)
  - Women's World Lightweight championship (2 times)
- International Professional Wrestling Hall of Fame
  - Class of 2022
- National Wrestling Alliance
  - NWA World Women's Championship (1 time, inaugural)
- Professional Wrestling Hall of Fame
  - Class of 2002
- World Women's Wrestling Association
  - WWWA World Heavyweight Championship (1 time)
- Women's Wrestling Hall of Fame
  - Class of 2023
- Wrestling Observer Newsletter
  - Wrestling Observer Newsletter Hall of Fame (Class of 1996)
- WWE
  - WWE Hall of Fame (Class of 2016)
