= The Fabulous Moolah =

American professional wrestler (1923–2007)

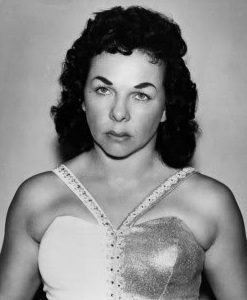
- Moolah in 1970

Personal information
- Born: Mary Lillian Ellisor; July 22, 1923 Kershaw County, South Carolina, U.S.
- Died: November 2, 2007 (aged 84) Columbia, South Carolina, U.S.
- Spouses: Walter Carroll (divorced) Buddy Lee (m. 1961; div. 1970)
- Children: 1

Professional wrestling career
- Ring name(s): Fabulous Moolah; The Fabulous Moolah; Slave Girl Moolah; The Spider Lady
- Billed height: 5 ft 6 in (168 cm)
- Billed weight: 138–160 lb (63–73 kg)
- Billed from: Columbia, South Carolina
- Trained by: Mildred Burke; Mae Young; Johnny Long
- Debut: 1949
- Retired: September 23, 2004

Mary Lillian Ellison (July 22, 1923 – November 2, 2007) was an American professional wrestler, promoter and trainer better known by her ring name The Fabulous Moolah.

She began her career working with promoter Billy Wolfe and his wife, wrestler and trainer Mildred Burke, as well as working alongside professional wrestler "Nature Boy" Buddy Rogers. She won the NWA World Women's Championship in 1956 and was the most prominent holder of the title for 28 years. She is overall an eight-time women's world champion and to this day holds the record as the longest reigning world champion in combination of all her reigns.

In the 1980s, she joined the World Wrestling Federation (WWF, later WWE) as part of the Rock 'n' Wrestling Connection storyline, feuding with Cyndi Lauper and Wendi Richter, the latter of whom defeated her for the WWF Women's Championship in the main event of The Brawl to End It All in 1984. Moolah regained the Women's Championship on two further occasions before entering semi-retirement towards the end of the decade. She continued to make sporadic appearances for WWF/WWE until her death, often in comedic roles with longtime friend Mae Young. In 1999, she became the oldest champion in the history of professional wrestling, up to that point in time, when she won the Women's Championship for a final time at age 76. (Note: This mark has since been surpassed by Pat Patterson, who was 78 years old when he captured the WWE 24/7 Championship in 2019.)

During her lifetime, Moolah was lauded as a leading figure in women's professional wrestling and was considered one of the industry's most known female wrestlers. She became the first woman to be inducted into the WWF Hall of Fame in 1995 and is also a member of the NWA Hall of Fame and the Professional Wrestling Hall of Fame. However, her legacy has since been damaged in the years following her death, when allegations surfaced that she had exploited female wrestlers under her tutelage both financially and sexually.

== Early life ==
Mary Lillian Ellison was born in 1923 in Kershaw County, South Carolina, and grew up in Tookiedoo, 12 miles from Columbia. The youngest of five children, Ellison was the only daughter of Henry Lee and Suzann Atkinson Ellison.

When her mother died of cancer, eight-year-old Ellison went to live with her paternal grandmother and worked on her cousin's cotton farm to make money. At age 10, Ellison was still deeply distraught over her mother's death; to cheer her up, her father took her to the local wrestling matches. Ellison liked the matches, but it was not until she saw Women's Champion Mildred Burke wrestle that "they began to mean much more" to her.

Ellison returned to the Columbia home of her father and brothers. She graduated from Columbia High School, and married L. Walter Carroll. They soon became parents to a daughter. A few months after the birth of her daughter, she divorced Carroll, leaving her daughter with a friend and setting out on a wrestling career of her own.

== Professional wrestling career ==
=== National Wrestling Alliance (1949–1983) ===
==== Early career (1949–1955) ====
Ellison began her wrestling career with Mildred Burke's husband Billy Wolfe, the dominant women's promoter of the time. She competed with many established female wrestlers, like Mae Young, Cecilia Blevins and Mildred Burke. Wolfe was notorious for advising his wrestlers to enter into sexual relationships with either himself or competing promoters to ensure additional bookings, a practice with which Ellison refused to go along. She, however, soon began a romance with wrestler Johnny Long. Long later introduced Ellison to Jack Pfefer who gave her the moniker "Slave Girl Moolah". By the early 1950s, Moolah was a valet for "Nature Boy" Buddy Rogers, accompanying him to the ring while providing eye candy for the male audiences and assisting Rogers against his opponents. Ellison broke up the partnership because Rogers kept pushing her to begin a sexual relationship. She then served as the valet for the Elephant Boy (Tony Olivas). Olivas was Mexican, but had very dark skin, which caused controversy when Ellison, a white woman, would kiss him on the cheek during their ring entrance routine. At one show in Oklahoma City, a man, who thought that Olivas was a black man, attempted to stab Ellison with a knife for kissing him. Moolah later left Pfeffer's promotion and began wrestling under Boston promoters Tony Santos and Paul Bowser. In 1955, she began working for Vince McMahon, Sr.'s Capitol Wrestling Corporation.

==== World Champion (1956–1983) ====
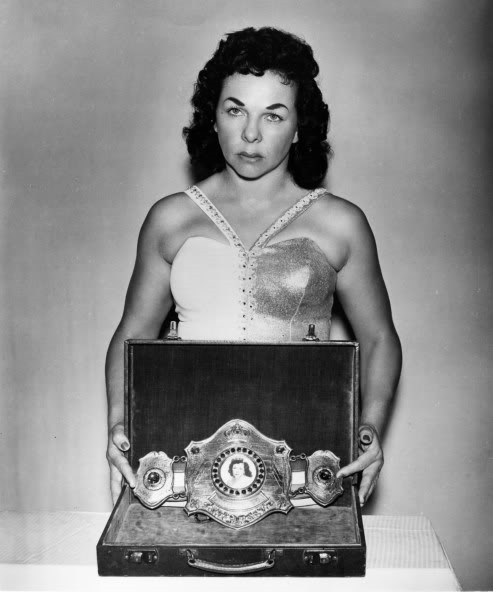
Moolah with the NWA World Women's Championship

On September 18, 1956, Moolah defeated Judy Grable in a 13-woman battle royal to win the vacant World Women's Championship, which shares a lineage with the NWA World Women's Championship. She was not immediately recognized by everyone as the NWA Champion because Billy Wolfe, with whom she had conflict earlier in her career, still controlled the promotion. After the match, Vince McMahon, Sr. dubbed Ellison with a new ring name – The Fabulous Moolah. Subsequently, June Byers came out of retirement to challenge Moolah to a match for the title. During the match, Moolah acted as the aggressor and pinned Byers to retain the championship. Moolah's first World Championship reign lasted over ten years. Moolah successfully defended the belt against the top female wrestlers in the world, such as Judy Grable and Donna Christanello, while also purporting to befriend some of the biggest celebrities of the day. Moolah claimed in her book, First Goddess of the Squared Circle, that she formed friendships with Elvis Presley and Jerry Lee Lewis.

After June Byers retired in 1964, Moolah was subsequently recognized as official NWA Champion, thus making her the undisputed Women's World Champion. Nevertheless, Moolah dropped the belt on September 17, 1966, to Bette Boucher, although she regained the title just weeks later. She also traded the belt with Yukiko Tomoe during a tour of Japan in 1968. On July 1, 1972, Moolah became the first woman allowed to wrestle at Madison Square Garden, which had previously banned women's wrestling. In fact, Moolah helped overturn the ban on women's wrestling in the entire state of New York, which the NYSAC lifted in June 1972. During her quest to overturn the ban, she flipped football player Roosevelt "Rosey" Grier onto his back on The Mike Douglas Show. Moolah continued an uninterrupted eight-year reign before losing to Sue Green at MSG in 1976. Moolah regained her title a short time later. She also bought the legal rights to the championship in the late 1970s, and after losing the championship to Evelyn Stevens for two days in 1978, began another long reign, defending her title for another six years. Also in the 1970s, Moolah held the NWA Women's World Tag Team Championship twice with Toni Rose.

=== World Wrestling Federation (1983–1987) ===
==== Rock 'n' Wrestling Connection (1983–1987) ====
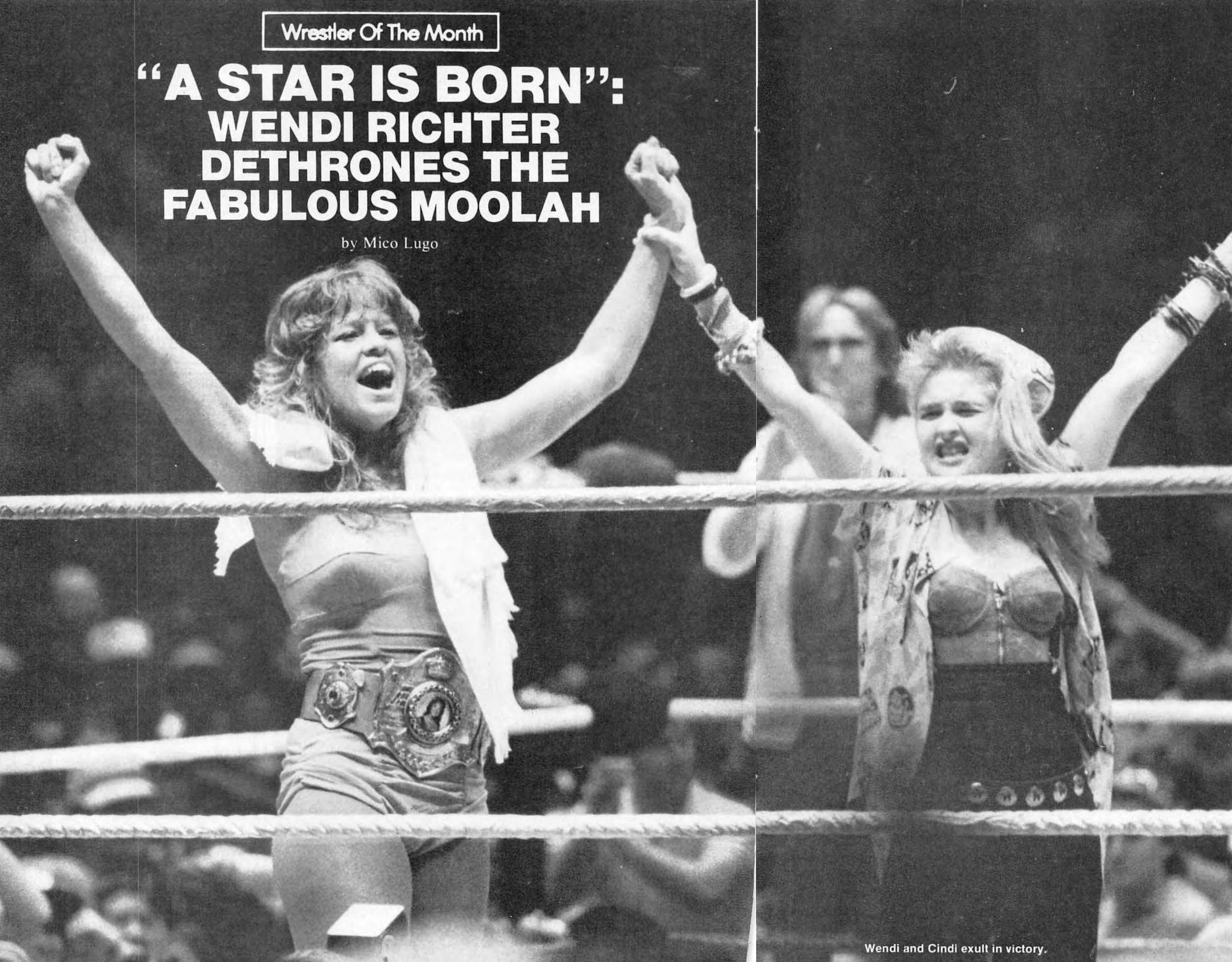
Wendi Richter (left) celebrates with Cyndi Lauper (right) after defeating Moolah

In 1983, Vincent Kennedy McMahon began expanding the WWF nationally, and Moolah sold him the rights to her Women's World Championship. Moolah agreed to appear exclusively for the WWF, and thus became the first WWF Women's Champion. The following year, singer Cyndi Lauper began a verbal feud with manager "Captain" Lou Albano, who long had a reputation of being a villain, that brought professional wrestling into mainstream culture in a storyline that became known as the "Rock 'n' Wrestling Connection". When it was finally time for Lauper and Albano to settle their differences in the ring, a match-up was scheduled with Albano representing Moolah against the challenge of Lauper's protégé, Wendi Richter. After much buildup and hype, the Fabulous Moolah lost the championship to Richter on July 23, 1984, in the main event of The Brawl to End It All, which was broadcast live on MTV. Prior to the match, the WWF promoted Moolah as holding the championship for the previous 28 years.

After losing the title to Richter, Moolah aided Leilani Kai in defeating Richter for the title in February 1985. Richter won it back at the inaugural WrestleMania, but when Richter's relationship soured with the WWF, Moolah donned a mask as "The Spider Lady" and regained the belt on November 25, 1985, in a controversial decision. Richter was never told she would be losing the title and fell victim to a real-life "screwjob" finish known as "The Original Screwjob". Richter promptly quit the WWF afterward, while Moolah continued to be champion for another two years—excluding a six-day reign by Velvet McIntyre during a tour of Australia in 1986—before losing the belt to Sherri Martel on July 24, 1987. She later captained a team at the inaugural Survivor Series. Her team (Moolah, Velvet McIntyre, Rockin' Robin, and the Jumping Bomb Angels) defeated champion Martel and her team (Leilani Kai, Judy Martin, Donna Christanello, and Dawn Marie).

=== American Wrestling Association (1988) ===
On September 3, 1988, Moolah wrestled AWA World Women's Champion Madusa Miceli to a double DQ on an independent card in Medina, Ohio. Afterwards Moolah would retire from wrestling.

=== Ladies International Wrestling Association (1990–2000) ===
During her retirement Moolah was the promoter for Ladies International Wrestling Association (LIWA) in 1990 based in North Carolina. Also the shows were held in Las Vegas. She started wrestling again in 1993 at the age of 70 when she defeated Sunny Brook. On June 21, 1996, she teamed with Mae Young at LIWA Golden Girls Extravaganza event in Las Vegas where they wrestled Liz Chase and Lori Lynn to a no contest. Moolah continued wrestling for the promotion and even continued teaming with Young. In 2000, while working for WWF; LIWA shut down. Moolah would continue working for WWF.

=== Return to WWF/E and Hall of Fame (1995, 1999–2007) ===
Throughout the early 1990s, she made appearances in video packages and at live WWF events. On June 24, 1995, she was the first female wrestler to be inducted into the WWF Hall of Fame. In the late 1990s, Pat Patterson and Ellison began jokingly discussing a comeback for her, which resulted in Patterson contacting WWF Chairman Vince McMahon about the possibility.

In 1999, Moolah and Mae Young re-emerged in the WWF (later renamed World Wrestling Entertainment, WWE). The WWF women's division, however, had since moved away from the traditional athletic match-ups of the past and now featured women competing in sexually themed bikini contests and strip matches.

Upon returning, Moolah and Young began appearing regularly in comedic roles. On the September 9, 1999, episode of SmackDown!, Jeff Jarrett invited Moolah, 76, into the ring and smashed a guitar over her head. On the September 27, 1999, episode of Monday Night Raw, Moolah and Young defeated Ivory in a Handicapped Evening Gown match, which led to a title match at No Mercy on October 17. The match saw Moolah defeat Ivory to regain the WWF Women's Championship, thus becoming the then-oldest champion ever, though she lost the title back to Ivory eight days later.

On the September 15, 2003, episode of Raw, Moolah won a match against Victoria. Moolah had been promised the match for her eightieth birthday and became the first octogenarian to compete in a WWE ring. After Moolah's victory, the "Legend Killer" Randy Orton came out and performed an RKO on her. Moolah and Young made another appearance at New Years Revolution in 2006, during a Bra and Panties Gauntlet match attacking Victoria and stripping her of her top. She also made brief appearances at WrestleMania 23 and the 2007 Draft Lottery on June 11, 2007. Her last WWE appearance before her death was at SummerSlam in August 2007, in a backstage segment with Vince McMahon and Raw General Manager William Regal.

== Training and promoting ==
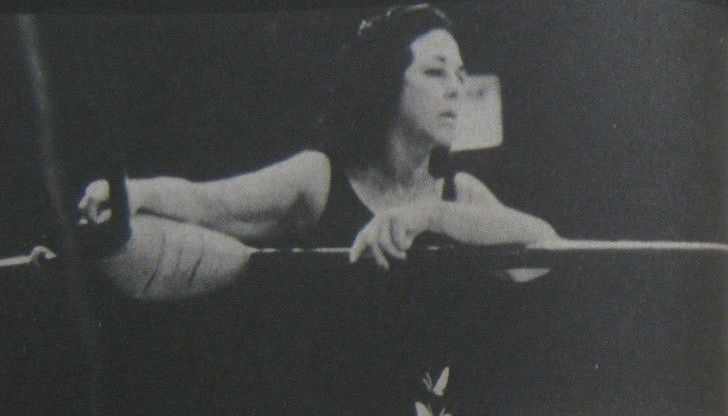
Moolah stands at a turnbuckle in 1975

Ellison and her second husband Johnny Long began training women to become female wrestlers, including Ella Waldek, Daisy Mae, and Katherine Simpson. Long later contacted promoter Jack Pfefer, who agreed to book some of the wrestlers at his shows. After marrying wrestler Buddy Lee, he began helping Ellison train the female wrestlers. After she left Pfeffer's promotion in the 1950s, Ellison found it difficult to book her trainees in shows due to Pfeffer's influence over other National Wrestling Alliance promoters. Ellison claimed Pfeffer would threaten to reveal the pre-planned nature of wrestling if any other promoters did not do as he liked. As a result, Ellison began selling cosmetics door-to-door and Lee opened a service station to make enough money to pay their bills. They later began to book their wrestlers, including Judy Grable in Boston, under promoter Paul Bowser.

In the late 1950s when the once-dominant promoter of women's wrestling, Billy Wolfe, was out of business, Ellison and Lee began to book their female wrestlers for more and more shows. They began calling their promoting business Girl Wrestling Enterprises (GWE). Ellison demanded a lot from the girls of GWE, including that they had to keep their hair and make-up done, act like a lady, and not date men who were in the professional wrestling business. In addition to women, Ellison also trained midget professional wrestlers, including Katie Glass in the 1960s. Ellison founded the Ladies' International Wrestling Association, a non-profit organization to help retired professional wrestlers, in the late 1980s. In the 1990s, she spent most of her time training female wrestlers at her school in Columbia, South Carolina. She also began training men, including Del Wilkes, and in 1995 trained more men than women. She also spent time training in Los Angeles at Verne Langdon's Slammers Gym.

== Allegations of exploitation ==
=== Financial and sexual exploitation ===
Journalist Dave Meltzer wrote an obituary for Moolah in which he stated that "different promoters had very different ideas of what being professional meant". Wrestling historian Tim Hornbaker said that Moolah "chose not to" break the "dishonest, greedy" practices established by her mentor Billy Wolfe. Pat Laprade and Dan Murphy, in their book Sisterhood of the Squared Circle, wrote that Moolah's "tactics could be just as ruthless and cutthroat as" Don Corleone, from The Godfather.

Wendi Richter and Mad Maxine both claimed that Ellison did not actually train the wrestlers at her wrestling school. According to Richter, Ellison accepted payment of the training fee (which at the time of Richter's training was $500) and had other female wrestlers within her camp (including Leilani Kai, Judy Martin, Winona Littleheart, and Joyce Grable) train the new recruits; these women did not get paid for their additional work as trainers. Richter also claimed that Ellison required all women that received training at her camp to sign a contract that allowed Ellison to function as their booker and receive 25% of their booking fee. Trainees were also required to rent duplex apartments on Ellison's property and they were responsible for paying her for rent and utilities. The training lasted six months and took place up to five hours per day inside a wrestling ring in a barn that lacked heating and air conditioning or fans. Mad Maxine said that due to owing Moolah both rent and training fees amounting to $1,500, the trainees "went into debt to [Moolah] and she controlled their lives... It was an environment ripe for abuse." Maxine also said that when she went to work for WWF, Moolah was taking at least half of her earnings. Debbie Johnson, another former trainee of Ellison's, stated that she was required to give Ellison 30% of her booking fee, and her paycheck was further reduced as Ellison deducted travel expenses, food, rent, and utilities before paying her. As a result, Johnson worked for Ellison for two years before she received any money. Johnson stated that Ellison would refuse to book certain women in her training camp if they angered her, and that Ellison monitored her and refused to let her leave the physical constraints of the training camp unless she was accompanied by someone else.

Over the years, various female wrestlers have come forward with stories accusing Ellison of being a pimp who often provided various wrestling promoters with unsuspecting female wrestlers that would be used as sex objects. Penny Banner directly described Moolah as a pimp who "in return for money" rented her female trainees out "in bulk" to wrestling promoters so that the promoters and male wrestlers could have sex with them. Banner said the women who were "sent on these tours were not told of this 'arrangement' ahead of time", and that "those who refused to have sex with wrestlers and promoters were raped." One of the most notorious accusations is from the family of Sweet Georgia Brown, who was trained by Moolah and her husband, Buddy Lee. The Columbia Free Times reported allegations made by her daughter in 2006, in which she said her mother told her that she was often raped, given drugs, and made an addict in an intentional attempt by Ellison and Lee to control her. Ida Mae Martinez, who wrestled during the 1950s, also recalls that many of the regional promoters "demanded personal services" before they would pay the female wrestlers. Mad Maxine described Moolah as an "evil person", saying Moolah sent trainees "out to this guy in Arizona and pimped them out" to make money. In a 2002 interview, Luna Vachon claimed that when she was sixteen years old and training at Ellison's camp, Ellison sent her out of state to be photographed by an older man. Although she remained clothed during the photo shoot, Vachon stated she felt taken advantage of by Ellison and the older man. Vachon also stated that her aunt, Vivian Vachon, witnessed Ellison abusing alcohol and having sex with her female trainees. Sandy Parker, a lesbian former pupil of Ellison's, also claims that Ellison forbade her from going to any gay bars and tried to press her to date men. Parker says this enraged her, because "(Moolah) was two-faced because she had her own little dalliances that we all knew about."

However, several former co-workers have spoken out in Ellison's defense. Professional wrestler Shane Douglas said he never heard anybody speaking against Moolah during his career. Former female wrestler Beverly Shade also defended Moolah, claiming "Moolah wasn't that kind of person." Jerry Lawler also said he "never heard or saw anything like that when I was in the business around Moolah and her girls." Former trainee Princess Victoria said Moolah never pimped any women or used drugs, but she did take money from them. Michael McCoy, Sweet Georgia Brown's son, refuted allegations made by his sister, stating that she has an agenda and that the allegations are false. However, on the Dark Side of the Ring episode about The Fabulous Moolah, Michael McCoy stated that she was indeed made to have sex with paying promoters. Bruce Prichard said she was protecting herself from the promoters and the only negative thing he heard of her was that she "took a percentage of their pay, which was laid out in their contract clearly before they even started training, day one."

=== Manipulation of the women's wrestling industry in the United States ===
As well as allegedly exploiting female wrestlers sexually, Ellison was accused of using her influence to control the women's wrestling scene and ensure that other women did not gain greater recognition. In addition to being a key participant in the original screwjob on Wendi Richter, Ellison used her influence to take over the spot originally held by her protégé Mad Maxine on the animated series Hulk Hogan's Rock 'n' Wrestling. Maxine was about to receive a big push by Vince McMahon but left the WWF shortly afterwards, as Ellison was unwilling to provide her with additional bookings. Maxine said that Moolah never told her about the WWF's plans to include her in the cartoon. Numerous other former trainees defected from Ellison after growing tired of sharing their paychecks with Ellison. Women wrestlers including Vivian and Luna Vachon, Ann Casey, and Darling Dagmar moved into other regions where Ellison had less control and negotiated their own payouts with promoters.

Both Judy Martin and Leilani Kai told in later interviews that Moolah would collect the women wrestlers' pay from promoters and, after taking out her own pay, would only give the girls half of the money they were owed (keeping half of their pay for herself, plus her own pay) and telling them that was all the promoter gave her to give them. Martin stated that shortly before Ellison left the WWF in 1988 (shortly after falling out with Martin and Kai due to Ellison no longer receiving their booking fees), she sabotaged the duo while they were touring Japan. Martin stated that Ellison contacted Japanese promoters and informed them that the Jumping Bomb Angels were supposed to drop the WWF Women's Tag Team Championship to The Glamour Girls before Martin and Kai returned to the United States. This was contrary to the booking decision made by Pat Patterson before the Japanese tour began. Unable to reach Patterson by telephone, Kai and Martin agreed to win the titles from the Angels since Ellison had already misinformed the Japanese promoters. Martin stated that upon returning to the United States, Patterson was angry with them and confirmed that nobody within the WWF made the decision for the title change and that due to her long-standing relationship with the company, the WWF refused to listen to their explanation of Ellison's deceit. Shortly thereafter, the WWF phased out the WWF Women's Tag Team Championship. In a later shoot interview, Leilani Kai told that had things gone as the WWF originally planned, The Glamour Girls would have had a title match against the Jumping Bomb Angels at WrestleMania IV and that Ellison's actions had cost the four girls what would have been ultimately their biggest ever payday.

Women that chose to continue allowing Ellison to work as their booker were kept under tight control. Velvet McIntyre was forced to compete against Ellison (whom McIntyre stated she didn't care for) at WrestleMania 2 instead of competing during an all-women tour of Kuwait with a group of Ellison's other female wrestlers. Their WrestleMania 2 match lasted less than two minutes with the referee ignoring McIntyre's leg being on the ropes while she was being pinned. Women that did not agree to Ellison's booking fees faced limited options. Rhonda Sing stated that Ellison contacted her and offered to let her wrestle Richter in a couple of pay-per-view matches for the WWF in 1985, but demanded she receive half of Sing's pay check; a stipulation Sing was unwilling to accept. Penny Banner stated that her retirement was due in large part to Ellison refusing to allow any of her female wrestlers to accept bookings against Banner, which severely limited the number of bookings that Banner was offered by promoters.

== Legacy ==
Moolah's career spanned over 5 decades. She was overall an eight-time world champion and is still widely recognized as the longest reigning champion of any wrestler in the wrestling business, holding the NWA/WWE Women's Champion for 10,775 days. Her last reign made history when she became the oldest female in WWE history to win the WWE Women's Champion at the age of 76. She was considered as an important figure and the forefront of women's wrestling from 1960s-1980s. Some of her notable trainees were Wendi Richter, Sherri Martel, Leilani Kai, Mad Maxine and Donna Christianello. On July 1, 1972, she and Vicki Williams were the first women to wrestle in Madison Square Garden. For her impact, longevity and contributions, she became the first female inducted into the WWE Hall of Fame in 1995 and eventually Professional Wrestling Hall of Fame in 2003.

At the time of her death, Kevin Eck wrote in The Baltimore Sun: "The Fabulous Moolah didn't just dominate women's wrestling for parts of four decades, she was women's wrestling. Moolah ... is unquestionably the most influential and famous female wrestler in history." The Post and Courier columnist Mike Mooneyham described her as "one of the greatest female performers to ever step into a professional wrestling ring and the most powerful woman outside the squared circle." She was the only female performer to be included in WWE's Top 50 Superstars of All Time DVD, placing 27th on the list. WWE describe her: "Moolah was recognized as the true pioneer and biggest legend in the history of women's wrestling." In 2016, after allegations against Moolah had become more prevalent, Luke Winkie of Sports Illustrated listed Moolah as the 69th greatest wrestler of all time because of her lengthy title reign but wrote that he "didn't feel great about it". Her house was located at Moolah Drive in South Carolina, a street named after her.

Dave Meltzer described that women's wrestling "went way way down" under Moolah's "tutelage", but he also said he did not know if it was her fault. Meltzer said that although women "used to headline and they were successful", "during the period Moolah controlled women's wrestling, the popularity and product didn't evolve". However, Meltzer noted that Moolah herself "stood the test of time" to remain culturally relevant long after the Japanese female wrestlers of the 1980s (more popular at that time) had faded from relevance.

In March 2018, WWE announced "The Fabulous Moolah Memorial Battle Royal", a battle royal for the female wrestlers of the company scheduled for WrestleMania 34 named in honor of Moolah. The decision to hold a battle royal in honor of Moolah drew controversy after the allegations of exploitation against Moolah resurfaced. Two days after the announcement, WWE renamed the match "WrestleMania Women's Battle Royal", removing Moolah's name from the event. A 2019 episode of Dark Side of the Ring broadcast on Viceland examined the allegations against her in the aftermath of the battle royal name controversy. The episode repeated many of the allegations against her but also featured comments from the son of Sweet Georgia Brown and wrestlers Selina Majors and Beverly Shade, who defended her. "If I choose not to like her because of what she did to me, that's fine", Princess Victoria stated. "But Moolah needs to be remembered. She was an icon in this business. You can't take away her history because she was an asshole!"

== Other media ==
An animated version of Moolah was included on Hulk Hogan's Rock 'n' Wrestling. In addition, she appeared in one of Cyndi Lauper's music videos, "The Goonies 'R' Good Enough". An illness in the mid-1970s meant Ellison had to pull out of the Bill Cosby movie Mother, Jugs & Speed, which had a role written specifically for her. In 2002, Moolah wrote her autobiography, The Fabulous Moolah: First Goddess of the Squared Circle. The book has been criticized for keeping kayfabe (the stance that wrestling storylines are real) and did not reveal a lot about her time controlling women's wrestling. Defending herself against these claims, Ellison retorted it was hard to fit all of her almost five decade career into one book.

Moolah and Young, along with several other female wrestlers, starred in the 2004 film Lipstick and Dynamite, a documentary about the female wrestlers from the 1950s era. They also appeared on Late Night with Conan O'Brien promoting the film.

== Filmography ==
Television and Film

Year	Title	Role	Notes
1961	To Tell The Truth	Self; contestant	1 episode
1970	Life with Linkletter	Self; guest	1 episode
1985	Hulk Hogan's Rock 'n' Wrestling	The Fabulous Moolah	Recurring
1985	The WWF's Amazing Managers	The Fabulous Moolah	Direct to video
1985	Best of the WWF Volume 1	The Fabulous Moolah	Direct to video
1986	The WWF's Grand Slams	The Fabulous Moolah	Direct to video
1986	The Life and Times of Captain Lou Albano	The Fabulous Moolah	Direct to video
1986	Best of the WWF Volume 5	The Fabulous Moolah	Direct to video
1987	Wrestling's Most Embarrassing Moments	The Fabulous Moolah	Direct to video
1987	Best of the WWF Volume 12	The Fabulous Moolah	Direct to video
1987	Best of the WWF Volume 13	The Fabulous Moolah	Direct to video
1988	Best of the WWF Volume 15	The Fabulous Moolah	Direct to video
1988	The Women of WWF	The Fabulous Moolah	Direct to video
1989	More Saturday Night's Main Event	The Fabulous Moolah	Direct to video
1995	WWF Hall of Fame	Self; inductee	TV special
1998	WWF Best of WrestleMania I-XIV	The Fabulous Moolah	Direct to video
1999	The Unreal Story of Professional Wrestling	Self; special thanks	Documentary
1999	The Daily Show	Self; guest	1 episode
1999	The 1999 Billboard Music Awards	Self; guest	TV special
2000	WWF Divas: Postcard from the Caribbean	The Fabulous Moolah	Direct to video
2001	Nikki	The Fabulous Moolah	1 episode
2002	WWE Divas: Undressed	The Fabulous Moolah	Direct to DVD
2004	WWE RAW Diva Search Casting Special	The Fabulous Moolah	TV special
2004	Lipstick & Dynamite, Piss & Vinegar: The First Ladies of Wrestling	The Fabulous Moolah	Documentary
2004	The Tonight Show with Jay Leno	Self; guest	1 episode
2005	Late Night with Conan O'Brien	Self; guest	1 episode
2006	WWE Hall of Fame 2006	Self; guest	TV special
2006	The American Dream: The Dusty Rhodes Story	Self; guest	Documentary
2008	Triple H: King of Kings	Self; archived footage	Documentary
2009	WWE: The Best of Smackdown! 10th Anniversary 1999-2009	Self; archived footage	Direct to DVD
2010	WWE: Top 50 Superstars of All Time	Self; archived footage	Direct to DVD, 27th place
2011	WWE: OMG! The Top 50 Incidents in WWE History	Self; archived footage	Direct to DVD
2013	The History of WWE: 50 Years of Sports Entertainment	Self; archived footage	Documentary
2015	WWE Hall of Fame 2015	Self; archived footage	TV special
2017	Ballerina I'm Not	Self; archived footage	Documentary
2018	Then, Now, Forever: Evolution of WWE's Women's Division	Self; archived footage	Documentary
2019-2024	Dark Side of the Ring	Self; archived footage	2 episodes
2022	Biography: WWE Legends	Self; archived footage	1 episode

Music videos

Year	Title	Artists	Role
1985	The Goonies 'R' Good Enough	Cyndi Lauper	The Fabulous Moolah
1985	The Goonies 'R' Good Enough (Part 2)	Cyndi Lauper	The Fabulous Moolah
1985	Land of a Thousand Dances	The Wrestlers	The Fabulous Moolah

Video game

Year	Title	Role	Notes
2000	WWF No Mercy	The Fabulous Moolah	Video game debut

== Personal life ==
Ellison's first husband was Walter Carroll, who became the father of her daughter Mary. Mary wrestled briefly but decided against pursuing the profession. Ellison had six grandchildren. Ellison and Carroll divorced shortly after their daughter's birth. Later, Ellison married wrestler Johnny Long. Marital conflicts developed when Long wanted Ellison to be a housewife instead of a career woman. In addition, Ellison accused Long of being a "womanizer". Ellison and Long divorced. Ellison also says that she dated country singer Hank Williams for four months in 1952. According to Ellison, Williams proposed to her, but Williams's drinking and heroin abuse forced the couple to go separate ways. She further claimed that he wanted Ellison to quit her wrestling career, which she did not want to do. Two months after the breakup, Williams died due to an overdose.

Later, Ellison met a wrestler named Buddy Lee, whom she regarded as the "love of her life". They were eventually married, and after divorcing in 1970 after nine years of marriage, they remained friends until Lee's death in 1999. The divorce was attributed to Lee's affair with Rita Cortez, one of the wrestlers the duo was training. In the early 1980s, Ellison opened Moolah's Hideaway, a bar and grill which was operated by her daughter Mary and frequented by André the Giant.

Beginning in 1991, Ellison lived with Mae Young in a house in Columbia, South Carolina. Her estate was located on a road named Moolah Drive. A midget professional wrestler named Katie Glass also lived with Moolah for over forty years. Another wrestler, Donna Christanello, also lived with Ellison on-and-off for forty years, ending in May 1999.

During her return to the ring in 1999, Ellison began experiencing occasional dizziness, and as a result, her doctor requested that she begin to wear a heart monitor. A few days later, Ellison was admitted to the hospital for what turned out to be two clogged arteries and viral pneumonia. She stayed at the intensive-care unit of the hospital for 24 days, during which she was unconscious for fifteen days. After leaving the hospital, she again slipped into unconsciousness in the bathroom at her home, crushing several vertebrae. She underwent successful back surgery in mid-December.

=== Death ===
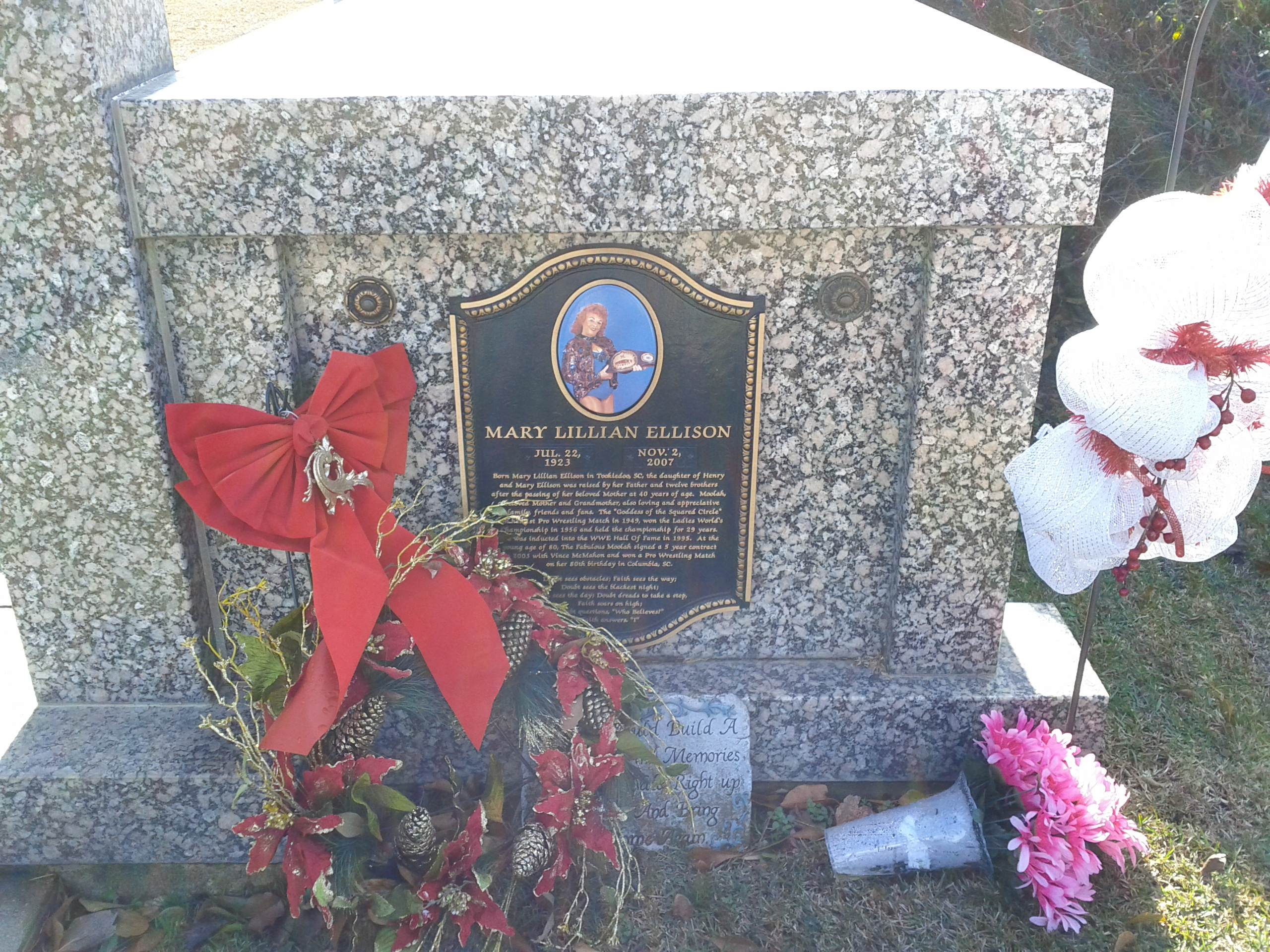
Ellison's gravestone in Columbia, South Carolina

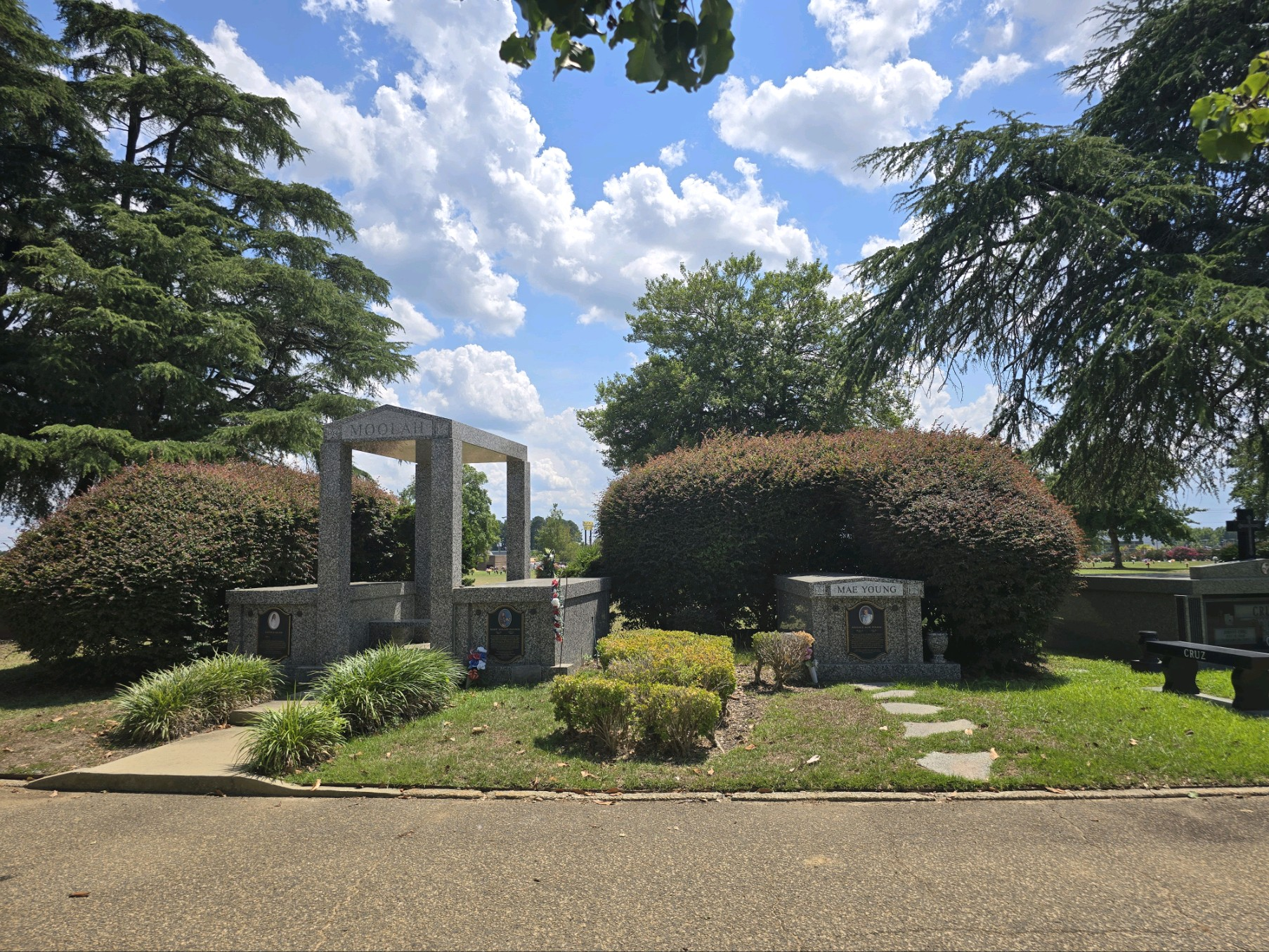
Fabulous Moolah crypt in Columbia, SC's Greenlawn Cemetery, with nearby Mae Young marker and a space for Katie Glass.

Ellison died on November 2, 2007, at the age of 84 in Columbia, South Carolina. According to her daughter Mary, the possible cause of death was a heart attack or blood clot related to a recent shoulder replacement surgery. Ellison is buried in a grave plot at Greenlawn Memorial Park in Columbia, South Carolina.

== Championships and accomplishments ==
- Cauliflower Alley Club
  - Ladies Wrestling Award (1997)
- National Wrestling Alliance
  - NWA World Women's Championship (4 times)
  - NWA World Women's Tag Team Championship (3 times) – with Toni Rose (2) and Patty Nelson (1)
  - NWA Hall of Fame (Class of 2012)
- Pro Wrestling Illustrated
  - Stanley Weston Award (1991)
- Professional Wrestling Hall of Fame and Museum
  - Class of 2003
- Stampede Wrestling
  - Stampede Wrestling Hall of Fame (Class of 1995)
- World Wrestling Federation
  - WWF Women's Championship (4 times, inaugural)
  - WWF Hall of Fame (Class of 1995)
- Wrestling Observer Newsletter
  - Worst Match of the Year (1984) vs. Wendi Richter on July 23
- Other
  - JWPA Women's Championship
  - USA Women's Wrestling Championship
  - Women's World Junior Heavyweight Championship (3 times)

== See also ==
- List of oldest surviving professional wrestlers
