= Women's World Championship =

Women's professional wrestling championship that contest from 1910 to 1954

Details
- Date established: 1910
- Date retired: 1954
Statistics
- First champion: Cora Livingston
- Final champion: June Byers
- Most reigns: 2 reigns: Clara Mortenson; Mildred Burke

The Women's World Championship was the first Women's professional wrestling world championship in the world.

== History ==
Cora Livingston defeated Hazel Parker in 1906. Though the contest was for the Featherweight Championship, from that point she billed herself as the first women's champion of the world. She then went to face women's champion Laura Bennett in a champion vs. champion title unification match in 1910. The match saw Cora Livingston victorious and it was at that time she was officially recognized as the first women's world champion.

Mildred Burke won a woman's world championship title in 1937 and held it for close to two decades. Mildred Burke won the women's wrestling world championship title defeating Clara Mortenson the inaugural champion. Clara had competed for the vacant championship against Barbara Ware, with Clara coming out victorious, following her victory, she was billed as the first women's world champion. On June 14, 1953, June Byers won a 13-woman tournament in Baltimore to claim the belt. She quickly became a popular fan favorite champion. Byers and Burke wrestled a two out of three falls match in 1954 it went to a no contest. Subsequently, Byers was recognized as the NWA World Women's Champion, and Burke went on to create the WWWA World Championship and was recognized as its first champion.

== Reigns ==
Key
No.	Overall reign number
Reign	Reign number for the specific champion
Days	Number of days held

No.	Champion	Championship change			Reign statistics		Notes	Ref.
No.	Champion	Date	Event	Location	Reign	Days	Notes	Ref.
1	Cora Livingston	October 1910	N/A	Kansas City, MO	1		Recognized as the first Women's Champion of the World.	
—	Vacated	1925	—	—	—	—	Livingstone retired as champion in 1925.	
2	Clara Mortenson	1932	N/A	N/A	1		Defeated Barbara Ware to win vacant title.	
3	Mildred Burke	January 28, 1937	N/A	Chattanooga, TN	1			
4	Clara Mortenson	February 11, 1937	N/A	Chattanooga, Tennessee	2		Despite having lost the title in 1937, Mortenson was billed as World Champion in her appearance fourteen years later in the 1951 film Racket Girls.	
5	Mildred Burke	April, 1937	N/A	N/A	2			
6	June Byers	April 14, 1953	N/A	Baltimore, MD	1		Byers won a 13-woman tournament to win the vacant championship.	
—	Deactivated	1954	—	—	—	—	Byers and Burke wrestled a two out of three falls match in 1954. The bout went to a no contest. Subsequently, Byers was recognized as the NWA World Women's Champion, and Burke went on to create the WWWA World Championship and was recognized as its first champion. The Women's World Championship was retired in 1954.	

== See also ==
- World Heavyweight Wrestling Championship (original version)
- Women's World Tag Team Championship
- NWA World Women's Champion
- WWWA World Championship
- World Women's Championship (disambiguation)

Sporting positions
Preceded by First	First women’s world wrestling championship 1910–1954	Succeeded by NWA World Women's, and WWWA World Single Championship
