= June Byers =

American professional wrestler (1922–1998)

Personal information
- Born: DeAlva Eyvonnie Sibley; May 25, 1922 Houston, Texas, U.S.
- Died: July 20, 1998 (aged 76) Houston, Texas, U.S.
- Spouse: Sam Meneker

Professional wrestling career
- Ring name: June Byers
- Billed height: 5 ft 7 in (170 cm)
- Billed weight: 150 lb (68 kg)
- Billed from: Houston, Texas
- Trained by: Billy Wolfe; Mae Young
- Debut: 1944
- Retired: 1964

DeAlva Eyvonnie Sibley (May 25, 1922 – July 20, 1998), better known by her ring name June Byers, was an American women's professional wrestler famous in the 1950s and early 1960s. She held the Women's World Championship for ten years and is a member of the Professional Wrestling Hall of Fame. She is overall a three-time women's world champion.

== Early life ==
Born in Houston, Texas, the tomboyish Sibley grew up around wrestling. Her uncle, Ottoway Roberts, worked for local wrestling promoter Morris Siegel, and as she got older, she often hung around the wrestlers and asked them to teach her their moves. On one occasion while DeAlva was playing around in the ring, the women's wrestling promoter Billy Wolfe happened to see her and recognized her potential. Already divorced once and facing poverty, she accepted Wolfe's offer to be trained as a professional wrestler.

== Professional wrestling career ==
Taking her family nickname of "June" and her ex-husband's last name of "Byers" for her ring name, Sibley made her professional debut in 1944. She spent the first years of her career traveling the country in Wolfe's promotion, sometimes winning preliminary matches but regularly losing to the more established stars such as Mae Young and champion Mildred Burke. Slowly rising in the ranks, she first won gold in 1952 when she and partner Millie Stafford won the Tag Title over Young and Ella Waldek.

That same year Mildred Burke had a bitter falling-out with husband Wolfe and departed the promotion, leaving the world title vacant. On June 14, 1953, a still relatively unknown Byers won a 13-woman tournament in Baltimore to claim the belt. She quickly became a popular fan favorite champion, even appearing as a contestant on the popular game shows What's My Line? and I've Got A Secret on August 16, 1953.

After a year of tense negotiation, Wolfe finally coaxed Burke into meeting Byers in a definitive two out of three falls match on August 20, 1954, in Atlanta, Georgia. Byers won the first fall, and then the match was called after an hour during the second fall. In the book The Queen of the Ring author Jeff Leen writes that despite battling injuries, Burke was able to hold Byers to a stalemate after dropping the first fall and thus deprive her of the second fall she needed to truly defeat Burke. Despite the inconclusive finish, the Atlanta Athletic Commission eventually awarded the match to Byers. Burke angrily returned to her own promotion, the World Women's Wrestling Association, where she held its title and billed herself as world champion. She maintained later that she had dropped the first fall with the intent to compete stronger in the second, and it is noted that Wolfe used all possible connections to try to get a win for his new star (and daughter-in-law) Byers. Byers, for her part, stressed that "Mildred claims she wasn't defeated, but I pinned her in the first fall. During the second fall, she left the ring and refused to come back. Regardless of what she told people, it was a shoot." Whatever the truth, the match outcome was satisfactory enough for the media to discredit Burke and acknowledge Byers as the legitimate world champion. Jeff Leen's account in Queen of the Ring contradicts Byers's claims about Burke leaving the ring and refusing to return. Furthermore, Leen details how Billy Wolfe had a great deal to do with putting Byers over as the "winner" and he quotes the ring announcer following the match as saying, "Commissioner stops the bout. Mildred Burke is still officially champion of the world".

Byers is described as a prominent figure in women's wrestling during her era, noted for her athleticism and technical skill, which contributed to the broader recognition and development of the sport. Her in-ring style combined technical proficiency with a physically demanding approach, and she developed a reputation for working intensely with opponents. Byers competed in multiple matches with Penny Banner, with whom she maintained a professional rivalry characterized by mutual respect. Byers regarded Banner as one of her most formidable opponents, while Banner later identified Byers as one of the greatest wrestlers in the field.

In 1956, the Baltimore Athletic Commission stripped Byers of the NWA Championship when she announced her plans to retire as champion. A thirteen-woman battle royal was used to determine the new champion. After The Fabulous Moolah won the championship, Byers came out of retirement to challenge her for the title, but Byers lost the match.

On March 31, 2017, Byers was posthumously inducted into the WWE Hall of Fame as a part of the Legacy wing.

== Personal life ==
The Fabulous Moolah alleges that while traveling with Billy Wolfe's troupe of female wrestlers, Byers often slept with Wolfe (despite his marriage to Burke) in order to get better bookings.

Upon Wolfe's death, Byers moved to St. Louis to work for wrestling promoter, and later TV ring announcer, Sam Menacker, who became her third husband. In 1963, while attempting to drive after being hit in the head with a Coke bottle, Byers experienced quadruple vision and collided with a tree. The leg damage from the auto accident cut her career short at age 41 and forced her to retire on January 1, 1964. In her later life, she had double vision from the incident.

Byers returned to Texas after retirement from the ring, becoming a real estate agent. She had two children, Billy and Jewel. Her son was fatally electrocuted in an accident, and Byers was reportedly never the same afterward. She died of pneumonia at her Houston home in 1998.

== Championships and accomplishments ==
- Independent
  - Women's World Championship (1 time, final)
  - Women's World Championship Tournament (1953)
- International Professional Wrestling Hall of Fame
  - Class of 2023
- American Wrestling Association
  - AWA World Women's Championship (1 time)
- National Wrestling Alliance
  - NWA World Women's Championship (1 time)
  - NWA World Women's Tag Team Championship (7 times) – with Ethel Johnson (1), Millie Stafford (2), Mary Jane Mull (2), Mars Bennett (1) and Barbara Baker (1)
- Professional Wrestling Hall of Fame
  - Women's Wrestling (Class of 2006)
- WWE
  - WWE Hall of Fame (Class of 2017)
