= Penny Banner =

American professional wrestler (1934–2008)

Personal information
- Born: Mary Ann Kostecki; August 11, 1934 St. Louis, Missouri, U.S.
- Died: May 12, 2008 (aged 73) Charlotte, North Carolina, U.S.

Professional wrestling career
- Ring name: Penny Banner
- Billed height: 5 ft 8 in (173 cm)
- Billed weight: 165 lb (75 kg)
- Trained by: Billy Wolfe
- Debut: 1954
- Retired: 1977

Mary Ann Kostecki (August 11, 1934 – May 12, 2008), better known by her ring name Penny Banner, was an American professional wrestler.

Best known for her time spent in the American Wrestling Association (AWA), she was also the Commissioner of the Professional Girl Wrestling Association (PGWA) from 1992 until her death. She was the first woman to be honored by the George Tragos/Lou Thesz Professional Wrestling Hall of Fame when she received the Frank Gotch Award in 2008 and is also a member of the Professional Wrestling Hall of Fame.

== Early life ==
Growing up, Mary Ann Kostecki's family did not have television. She idolized Hank Williams, a musician, when she was young.

Later, Kostecki began working as a cocktail waitress in St. Louis, while also acting as a nanny to three children. During this time, Sam Muchnick, president of the National Wrestling Alliance (NWA), came into the lounge where she worked, and her boss told him that Banner was capable of doing two-hundred sit-ups. Muchnick bet her she could not complete the task, and after she did, she began getting calls to be a female professional wrestler.

== Professional wrestling career ==
Kostecki began her career in professional wrestling as a way to learn how to defend herself outside of the ring. She came up with the name Penny Banner because she admired Charlton Heston, who used the surname Banner in a movie, and the first name Penny was also significant to her.

Banner was known for her "dirty" wrestling style, saying "boos are better than no audience reaction at all".

She held many titles in her career, including the NWA Women's World Tag Team Championship three times between 1956 and 1960 and the AWA World Women's Championship in 1961. In 1959, a match with NWA World Women's Champion June Byers, which ended in a draw, although Byers had consistently beat her in matches for three years prior. She was then booked into a match with Byers in Indiana for the newly formed American Wrestling Alliance (AWA) in August 1961, but Byers no-showed. Instead of their scheduled match, the AWA booked a battle royal, which Banner won to become the first AWA World Women's Champion. She vacated the title when she moved to North Carolina with her husband and child.

During her career, Banner had her nosed ripped up and her elbow dislocated. Banner claimed that she retired in 1977 after June Byers, who owned the NWA World Women's Championship, retired because of a car accident, and that The Fabulous Moolah had cornered much of the national women's professional wrestling scene with her trainees and herself, which left Banner with nobody to wrestle in the Carolinas. In her last twenty years of wrestling, Banner was only defeated twice: once by Moolah and once by Belle Starr, both of whom used the ropes for leverage while pinning Banner.

== After retirement ==
After retiring from the ring, Banner worked as a real-estate agent, worked in a rodeo, was the president of a local 4H, and began showing horses. In 1990, she was diagnosed with emphysema and began swimming competitively to quit her smoking. She competed in the Senior Olympics doing swimming and winning the bronze medal in the 50m Backstroke. Plus the shot put and discus throws. She also served as the Commissioner of the Professional Girl Wrestling Association (PGWA) from 1992 until her death. She also appeared for WCW at Slamboree 1994 with other wrestling legends.

Banner's autobiography Banner Days was completed 2005. The book took her three years to write. Also in 2005, she was featured in the documentary film Lipstick & Dynamite. Her tag team partner Betty Jo Hawkins was Banner's best friend for thirty-three years until Hawkins died.

== Personal life ==
Banner went on five dates with Elvis Presley between 1956 and late 1958. He also frequently saw her wrestle in Memphis. Their last date was one week before he left to join the army, and they never saw each other again. She was married to Johnny Weaver for thirty-five years before divorcing him in 1994. She became pregnant in 1959, giving birth to a daughter named Wendi.

In late 2005, Banner was diagnosed with cancer. In February 2006, the cancer had shrunk considerably after a doctor's check-up. In late 2007, Banner suffered several health crises, including pneumonia, resulting in severe weight loss. She died in her sleep at the home of her daughter, Wendi, in Charlotte, North Carolina on May 12, 2008.

== Championships and accomplishments ==
- American Wrestling Association
  - AWA World Women's Championship (1 time)
- Cauliflower Alley Club
  - Art Abrams Lifetime Achievement Award (1997)
  - Other honoree (1992)
- George Tragos/Lou Thesz Professional Wrestling Hall of Fame
  - Frank Gotch Award (2008)
- Georgia Championship Wrestling
  - NWA Southern Women's Championship (Georgia version) (1 time)
- National Wrestling Alliance
  - NWA Women's World Tag Team Championship (5 times) – with Betty Jo Hawkins (2), Bonnie Watson (1) and Lorraine Johnson (2)
- NWA Southwest Sports
  - NWA Texas Women's Championship (2 times)
- NWA Wrestling Legends Hall of Heroes
  - Class of 2007
- Professional Wrestling Hall of Fame
  - Class of 2005
- Stampede Wrestling
  - Stampede Wrestling Hall of Fame (Class of 1995)
- St. Louis Wrestling Hall Of Fame
  - Class of 2007
