= Billy Wolfe =

American professional wrestling promoter

Billy Wolfe

William Harrison Wolfe (July 4, 1896 – March 7, 1963) was a professional wrestling promoter who was active from the 1930s to the 1950s. Wolfe was the husband and manager of Mildred Burke and ran a traveling troupe of women wrestlers alongside her.

== Early life ==
Wolfe was the second child born to John and Lucinda Wolfe, in Daviess County, Missouri. He was drafted into the military in World War I and began pursuing wrestling at a Kentucky duty station. As a competing middleweight, Wolfe claimed the Missouri State title in 1923, and established himself as a challenger to Charles "Midget" Fischer of Wisconsin. He was known by his peers for doing whatever was necessary to win a match.

== Relocation to Kansas City ==
He married Margaret Johnson on February 22, 1922, and celebrated their first child, George William Wolfe, known as "Billy Wolfe, Jr." After the birth of their second child, Violet, the Wolfe family moved to Kansas City. Billy decided to instruct women at his gymnasium. After a divorce from Margaret, Wolfe married Barbara Ware, a wrestler known for competing with men. Ware and Wolfe's marriage also ended in divorce.

== Marriage to Mildred Burke ==
While training aspiring women wrestlers, he met Mildred Bliss, an office stenographer with ambitions to become a wrestler. The close proximity of training resulted in a relationship and ultimately marriage. Changing her name to Mildred Burke, she defeated Clara Mortensen for the Women's World Championship in January 1937.

In late 1949, Wolfe joined the National Wrestling Alliance (NWA), making his stable of 30 women available to all promoters. At each show, he received a percentage of the gross, and his promotion of women grapplers earned him riches that resulted in extravagant living. On the road, he stood as a father figure to the women he trained and managed, but he also earned a reputation as a womanizer. His marriage to Burke was not monogamous, as he enjoyed the companionship of women with whom he traveled.

Tensions emanated from the extramarital activity, and in 1952, Wolfe and Burke went their own ways. Wolfe retaliated as he froze Burke out of wrestling on all NWA channels. Burke consulted Jack Pfefer for help. The Alliance attempted to reconcile the couple, and the final result was that one would sell out to the other. Burke actually volunteered to sell for $50,000 but was rebuffed. On January 26, 1953, Wolfe sold to Burke, who created the company Attractions, Inc. The deal was for $30,000; all alimony was waived, and Wolfe was barred from participating for five years. The pledge lasted only a few months as Wolfe started promoting wrestling in Columbus, Ohio. Wolfe tempted many grapplers by offering 50% of the proceeds. Burke challenged him by offering 60% of the proceeds from her promotion, but Wolfe settled on the figure of 75%.

== Controversy over competing promotions ==
Attractions, Inc. went into bankruptcy and into the hands of receiver James Hoff of Columbus. Eight months later, Hoff named Wolfe as administrator and was approved by Franklin County Judge William Bryant. In a memorandum dated August 20, 1953, Wolfe announced that he was the booker for Burke and her stable of 27 wrestlers.

Burke disputed this claim on August 26, 1953, stating that the issue was settled in the courts. She stated that her contract prohibited Wolfe from competing in wrestling and was in breach of the binding agreement. Aligning herself with Leroy McGuirk, she hoped to be vindicated by the Alliance at their September 1953 meeting in Chicago. The result was that the Alliance declined to recognize women's wrestling. Wolfe had regained his stake. The result was that his son's wife June Byers was touted as world champ following a tournament in Baltimore. Wolfe's girlfriend Nell Stewart was recognized as Women's U.S. Titleholder. Many women were loyal to Burke and refused to wrestle for Wolfe.

== Discrediting Mildred Burke ==
Despite the fact that the NWA declined to recognize women's wrestling, the Alliance was still at the center of many conflicts between Wolfe and Burke. In a letter to Alliance members on November 4, 1953, Burke refuted Wolfe's claim that she would wrestle only one woman grappler.

Despite listing 12 grapplers that she would work with, Wolfe used his influence to get her frozen from NWA members. The result was that her run in the Southeast with Cowboy Luttrall and Paul Jones in 1954 fizzled. Adding insult to injury, Burke wrestled Wolfe's daughter-in-law June Byers. The match took place on August 20, 1954, in Atlanta and the match was a shoot. By having the local commission in his corner, Wolfe slid a friendly referee into the match. Despite giving up the first fall with the intention of competing stronger in the second, Burke never had the opportunity. Officials called the match, and the second fall never had a finish.

Burke left the ring believing that her title was safe because she had not lost two falls. Many in the press stated that Byers had defeated her and the image of Burke's championship was tarnishing.

== Death and legacy ==
Wolfe died from a heart attack on March 7, 1963. Negative stories about Wolfe by the women who wrestled for him are prolific. In her autobiography Lillian Ellison, (aka The Fabulous Moolah) recalls his extreme chauvinism (he turned to managing women wrestlers only after failing as a wrestler and as a manager of male wrestlers), his financial misdealings and routine sexual harassment of his "girls" before, during and after his marriage to Mildred Burke. Due to his managerial contract with her he was able to leave Burke penniless when she divorced him, taking all of their marital assets and leaving her with nothing to show for decades of hundreds of wrestling matches per year. The horror stories of Wolfe led to the success of Jack Pfeffer and of Moolah herself. Wolfe influence helped make women's wrestling profitable and move beyond a sideshow act. Part of Wolfe's contributions to women's wrestling was the creation of a tag team title and the integration of African-American wrestlers.
