= List of former Universal Wrestling Association personnel =

Former Universal Wrestling Association personnel

The following is a list of Universal Wrestling Association Alumni, that is wrestlers that have at some point worked for the Mexican professional wrestling promotion Universal Wrestling Association (UWA) that existed from 1975 until 1995.

== Male ==
Name
A
Abdullah the Butcher
Perro Aguayo^{†}
Búfalo Allen^{†}
América Salvaje
André the Giant^{†}
Ángel Blanco, Jr.
Aníbal^{†}
Aristóteles I
Asterisco
Astro De Oro
Astro Rey, Jr.
Atlantis
El Audaz
B
Babe Face
Babe Richard
Virus (wrestler)
Black Magic
Black Man^{†}
Black Power
Black Scorpio
Black Shadow, Jr.
Black Terry^{†}
Blue Blazer^{†}
Blue Panther^{†}
Bobby Lee
Bonzai Kid
El Brazo^{†}
Brazo de Oro^{†}
Brazo de Plata^{†}
C
El Canek
Capitan America
Negro Casas
Cassandro
Centurión Negro
Emilio Charles Jr.^{†}
Chicano Power
Riki Choshu
Cibernético
El Cobarde II
Mr. Cóndor
El Coralillo
Don Corleone
Crush
Javier Cruz
Cuchillo
D
Dory Dixon
Dos Caras
E
Eric Embry
Engendro I
Espanto, Jr.
Estrella Blanca^{†}
F
El Fantasma
Fatu
José Luis Feliciano
El Felino
Valente Fernández
Fishman^{†}
Flama Dorada
Flama Dorado II
Fuerza Guerrera
Tatsumi Fujinami
Doug Furnas^{†}
G
Humberto Garza
Gigante Warrior
Gran Cochisse
Gran Hamada
Great Sasuke
René Guajardo^{†}
H
Head Hunter A
Head Hunter B
Heavy Metal
El Hijo del Diablo
El Hijo del Santo
Hulk Hogan
Huracán Ramírez^{†}
I
Antonio Inoki^{†}
J
Jungla Negra
Jushin Thunder Liger
K
Kahoz
The Killer
The King
Kuniaki Kobayashi
Kokina^{†}
Konnan
Dan Kroffat
Kung Fu^{†}
Kato Kung Lee^{†}
Kurisu
L
Karloff Lagarde^{†}
Karloff Lagarde, Jr.^{†}
Lasser
Lobo Rubio
Loco Valentino^{†}
Loco Zandokan^{†}
Charles Lucero
M
Mano Negra
Marabunta
La Máscara^{†}
Máscara Año 2000
El Matemático
May Flowers
Cachorro Mendoza
Ray Mendoza^{†}
Ringo Mendoza
Mestizo
Mil Máscaras
Mocho Cota^{†}
Mohicano I
Mohicano II
Mongolian Yuga
N
Negro Navarro
Nikozuna
O
Oro^{†}
P
El Pantera
Pat Patterson^{†}
Pegasus Kid^{†}
Miguel Pérez, Jr.
Pimpinela Escarlata
Punish
R
Rambo
Rayo de Jalisco^{†}
Rayo Tapatío I
Rayo Tapatío II
Rudy Reyna
Ray Richard
Rodolfo Ruiz
S
Masa Saito^{†}
Adonis Salazar
La Salvaje
Sangre Chicana
Ricky Santana
Rocky Santana
El Santo^{†}
El Satánico
El Scorpio
Scorpio, Jr.^{†}
Shu El Guerrero
El Signo^{†}
Silver King^{†}
Tiger Jeet Singh
Skayde
El Solar
El Solitario^{†}
Sunny War Cloud
Super Astro
Super Kendo
Super Ratón
T
George Takano
Tarahumara
El Texano^{†}
Lou Thesz^{†}
Tinieblas
Renato Torres
U
Último Dragón
Ultraman
V
Big Van Vader^{†}
César Valentino
Vampiro
Enrique Vera
Villano I^{†}
Villano II^{†}
Villano III^{†}
Villano IV
Villano V^{†}
W
Dr. Wagner, Jr.^{†}
Y
Yamato
Z
Zeus^{†}

== Female ==
Name
A
Irma Aguilar
B
La Briosa
C
Vicky Carranza
D
Diosa de Plata
G
Reyna Gallegos
Irma González
Lola González
J
Miss Janeth^{†}
Josseline
M
La Medusa
Mujer Salvaje
O
La Olímpica
P
Pantera Sureña
S
La Sirenita
V
La Venus
W
Vicky Williams
Z
Zuleyma

== Mini-Estrellas ==
Name
Fuercita Guerrera
Micro Konnan
Pequeño Goliath
Pequeño Chucky

== Teams and Stables ==
Team name	Team members
Los Brazos	Brazo de Oro, Brazo de Plata, El Brazo
Can-Am Connection	Doug Furnas, Phil LaFon
Los Cowboys	El Texano, Silver King
The Hawaiian Beasts	Fatu, Kokina, the Samoan Savage
Los Misioneros de la Muerte	Negro Navarro, El Signo, El Texano, Black Power II, Rocky Santana
Los Mohicanos	Mohicano I, Mohicano II
Los Rayos Tapatío	Rayo Tapatío I, Rayo Tapatío II
Trio Fantásticos	Black Man, Kato Kung Lee, Kung Fu
Los Villanos	Villano I, Villano II, Villano III, Villano VI, Villano V
