= 1958 in professional wrestling =

1958 in professional wrestling describes the year's events in the world of professional wrestling.

== List of notable promotions ==
Only one promotion held notable shows in 1958.

| Promotion Name | Abbreviation |
|---|---|
| Empresa Mexicana de Lucha Libre | EMLL |

== Calendar of notable shows ==
| Date | Promotion(s) | Event | Location | Main Event |
|---|---|---|---|---|
| April | EMLL | 2. Aniversario de Arena México | Mexico City, Mexico | |
| September 26 | EMLL | EMLL 25th Anniversary Show | Mexico City, Mexico | Rolando Vera (c) defeated Black Shadow in a best two-out-of-three falls match for the NWA World Middleweight Championship |
(c) – denotes defending champion(s)

== Championship changes ==
=== EMLL ===
NWA World Light Heavyweight Championship
incoming champion - Vacant
| Date | Winner | Event/Show | Note(s) |
| February 13 | Dory Dixon | EMLL show | EMLL was given control of the championship after joining the National Wrestling Alliance. Dixon defeated Al Kashey to win the championship. |

NWA World Middleweight Championship
incoming champion – Ronaldo Vera
No title changes

NWA World Welterweight Championship
incoming champion – Blue Demon
| Date | Winner | Event/Show | Note(s) |
| January 31 | Karloff Lagarde | EMLL show | |

Mexican National Heavyweight Championship
incoming champion - El Médico Asesino
No title changes

Mexican National Middleweight Championship
incoming champion – El Santo
No title changes

Mexican National Lightweight Championship
incoming champion – Vacant
| Date | Winner | Event/Show | Note(s) |
| May 17 | Juan Diaz | EMLL show | Defeated Jesus Garcia to win the vacant championship |

Mexican National Light Heavyweight Championship
incoming champion – Espectro I
No title changes

Mexican National Welterweight Championship
incoming champion – Karloff Lagarde
No title changes

Mexican National Tag Team Championship
incoming champion – Los Hermanos Shadow (Black Shadow and Blue Demon)
| Date | Winner | Event/Show | Note(s) |
| Uncertain | Unknown | N/A | |
| Uncertain | Espectro I and Ray Mendoza | EMLL show | |

Mexican National Women's Championship
incoming champion – Uncertain
| Date | Winner | Event/Show | Note(s) |
| Uncertain | Irma Gonzalez | EMLL show | |
| September 28 | La Dama Enmascarada | EMLL show | |
| Uncertain | Chabela Romero | EMLL show | |

=== NWA ===
NWA Worlds Heavyweight Championship
Incoming Champion – Dick Hutton
| Date | Winner | Event/Show | Note(s) |
No title changes

== Debuts ==
- Debut date uncertain:
  - Abdullah the Butcher
  - Ángel Blanco
  - Dominic DeNucci
  - Gene Anderson
  - Kurt Von Steiger
  - Pat Patterson
  - Toru Tanaka
- March – Don Manoukian
- May 2 – El Matemático
- June – Johnny Saint
- November 11 – Pedro Morales

== Births ==
- January 4 – Jim Powers
- January 5 – Awesome Kong(died in 2012)
- January 8 – Rey Misterio(died in 2024)
- January 10 – Jerry Estrada
- January 30 – Rocky King (died in 2022)
- January 31 – Dave Finlay
- February 3 – Kerry Brown (wrestler) (died in 2009)
- February 4 – Outback Jack
- February 7 – Rusty Brooks (died in 2021)
- February 8 – Sensational Sherri(died in 2007)
- February 19 – Tommy Cairo
- March 10:
  - Máscara Año 2000
  - Pierroth Jr.
- March 16 – Mike McGuirk
- March 22 – Wayne Bloom
- March 24 – Dieusel Berto (died in 2018)
- March 26 – Bert Prentice (died in 2021)
- March 28 – Curt Hennig(died in 2003)
- March 30 – Mike Rotunda
- April 11 – Marc Mercier (died in 2026)
- April 17 – Nailz
- May 5 – Wally Yamaguchi(died in 2019)
- May 15 – Ron Simmons
- May 20 – Nikolai Zouev (died in 2022)
- May 28 – Barry Orton(died in 2021)
- June 2 – Lex Luger
- June 8 – Dan Severn
- June 16 – Ted Arcidi
- June 18 – Tommy Stewart
- June 23 – George Takano
- June 24:
  - Tiny Lister(died in 2020)
  - Chicky Starr
- June 25 – Damien Demento
- July 1 – Tom Magee
- July 19 – Robert Gibson
- July 22 – David Von Erich(died in 1984)
- July 26 – Romano Garcia
- August 12 – Motor City Madman
- August 14 – Bobby Eaton (died in 2021)
- August 22:
  - Stevie Ray
  - Brady Boone(died in 1998)
- August 25 – Len Denton
- August 30 – King Kaluha
- September 3 – Shiro Koshinaka
- September 6 – The Barbarian
- September 20 – Arn Anderson
- October 6 – Rocky Della Serra
- October 15 – Jeff Gaylord(died in 2023)
- October 20 – Scott Hall(died in 2022)
- November 14 – Jim Martinez
- November 21:
  - Ricky Santana
  - Johnny Rich
- November 26:
  - El Texano(died in 2006)
  - James Warring
- November 30 – Tom Zenk(died in 2017)
- December 5 – Dynamite Kid(died in 2018)
- December 7:
  - Rick Rude(died in 1999)
  - Javier Cruz
- December 21 – El Tirantes

== Deaths ==
- January 9 – James Heywood Allen, 77
- February 23 – Dean Detton, 49
- April 25 – Herman Hickman, 46
- June 20 – Dan McLeod, 97
- July 17 – Americus, 74
