= Lady Victoria =

American professional wrestler

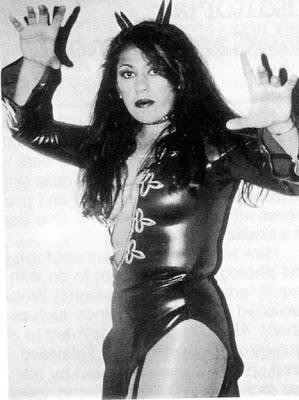
- Lady Victoria (2011)

Personal information
- Born: Victoria Ann Moreno; September 15, 1972 (age 53) Barstow, California, U.S.

Professional wrestling career
- Ring name(s): Alondra; Chiquitibum; Lady Victoria; Victoria Morena; Victoria Starr
- Billed height: 5 ft 3 in (1.60 m)
- Billed weight: 140 lb (64 kg)
- Billed from: San Diego, California
- Debut: 1991

Victoria Ann Moreno (born September 15, 1972), better known by her ring name Lady Victoria, is an American professional wrestler, manager/valet, and actress. She began training to wrestle in 1991 and made her American professional wrestling debut on January 16, 1993. Lady Victoria made her first Mexican wrestling appearance during the Consejo Mundial de Lucha Libre (EMLL) event held at the Grand Olympic Auditorium in Los Angeles on July 9, 1994 as well as her AAA debut in Tijuana in 1995 and television debut at Triplemanía IV-A in Orizaba, Veracruz on July 15, 1996. During her career, Lady Victoria has performed all over the USA and Mexico, performing for companies such as AAA, CMLL/EMLL, International Wrestling Revolution Group, Promo Azteca, and Xtreme Pro Wrestling.

== Professional wrestling career ==
=== California and AAA ===
Moreno debuted as Victoria Starr, after being trained by Billy Anderson and Jesse Hernandez. She began wrestling as Lady Victoria three months into her career. She first performed in Tijuana in late 1993, where she was first introduced to the lucha libre style of wrestling. Having found this style closer to home, she began training and performing Lucha Libre at the All Nations Center in Los Angeles and the Boys and Girls Club in Pomona Valley for Sergio Garcia.

She then worked for the AAA promotion in Baja California in 1995, Lady Victoria grew her fan base by performing all over the United States independent shows for various companies in American style wrestling. At his time she had first comic book published by Pin & Ink, ThunderGirls Series titled “Lady Victoria vs. Queen of the Vampires”. She also worked for the Professional Girl Wrestling Association (PGWA) out of North Carolina.

Lady Victoria’s first major television debut was with AAA, where some of her biggest feuds were with Miss Janeth. Lady Victoria was introduced at the Triplemanía IV-A main event in Orizaba, Veracruz on July 15, 1996 as the valet and Manager to Máscara Sagrada while Miss Janeth was valet and manager to Killers. Later that night, her right hand was fractured which limited her performance for the next three to four months. During this time, Pierroth, Jr. was suspended for powerbombing Lady Victoria. She then also starting wrestling as both Lady Victoria and masked as Chiquitibum (pronounced – chi-qi-ti-boom). She feuded with Zuleyma (Miss Janeth’s older sister), Miss Janeth, and La Briosa. She also occasionally teamed with La Sirenita and Princesa Apache.

=== Independent circuit ===
Performing as Alondra in International Wrestling Revolution Group, she feuded with Miss Janeth, Barbara Blaze, La Indomable, Mohicana, and Migala. She performed for the company from 1996 to 1999. Alondra also occasionally teamed up with Irma Aguilar.

Shortly after leaving AAA, Lady Victoria was invited to Promo Azteca where she managed and acted as a valet to El Hijo del Diablo and occasionally the tag team of Damian 666 and Halloween. Being the only woman wrestler/manager in the company, she was elected to start a Women’s Division, which got under way with few Luchadoras and several “Indy” promotions to ready for television, which led her to continue performing with IWRG as Alondra and CMLL/EMLL as Lady Victoria.

=== Consejo Mundial de Lucha Libre ===
In Consejo Mundial de Lucha Libre (EMLL), Lady Victoria feuded with La Diabólica, Infernal, and La Amapola. She also partnered with Lady Apache and Princessa Blanca. Then, as Lady Victoria was so over from being El Hijo del Diablo’s valet prior in Promo Aztecas, they began to partner her with La Diabolica against Lady Apache and Princessa Blanca.

=== La Familia de Tijuana ===
In early 1999, Lady Victoria was feeling a home sick and decided to return to the USA to perform in Baja California. Upon returning, Lady Victoria became the valet for Halloween, which eventually led to the formation of the La Familia de Tijuana alliance, as well as a feud with Lola Gonzalez.

La Familia also began their stint in XPW in 2001. Lady Victoria accompanied La Familia to Xtreme Pro Wrestling (XPW), where they were known as Mexico’s Most Wanted (MMW), in 2001. She performed with Damien and Halloween not only as a manager, but participated in six man tag matches. She had feuds with opposite gender Angel in singles competition. She left Mexico's Most Wanted briefly to join The Black Army, only to return to the side of MMW. Lady Victoria ultimately took a break from performing altogether in 2002.
