= Women's Wrestling Hall of Fame =

Professional and amateur wrestling hall of fame

- Formation: 2022 (4 years ago)
- Members: 53 total inductees 44 Individual inductees 3 group inductee (7 wrestlers); 2 promotion inductees
- Website: Women's Wrestling Hall of Fame

The Women's Wrestling Hall of Fame (WWHOF) is a hall of fame which honors women who have participated in women's professional wrestling, women's amateur wrestling, and other forms of grappling.

== History ==
The Hall of Fame was founded in 2022 by Angel Orsini, Christopher Annino, Gary Wolfe and Sue Green. It started as an offshoot of a documentary Orsani and director Annino have been making about women's professional wrestling titled Circle of Champions.

2023's inaugural class were honored during a ceremony at 2300 Arena in Philadelphia, Pennsylvania on December 17, 2022. Jazz and Madusa received their inductions in person, and Gangrel accepted Luna Vachon's posthumous award on her behalf. 86-year old Beverly Shade received her induction remotely, just months before her death. Co-founder Christopher Annino has expressed a desire to see Donna Christanello, Sue Green and Toni Rose inducted on a broadcast of NWA Powerrr because of their history with the National Wrestling Alliance.

== Inductees ==
#	Image	Year	Ring name (Birth name)	Category	Notes	Ref
1		2023	Cora Livingston (Cora B. Bowser)	Pre-Radio Era	Inaugural Women's World Champion.	
2		2023	Mildred Burke (Mildred Bliss)	Radio Era	Two-time Women's World Champion. Inaugural NWA World Women's Champion.	
3		2023	Beverly Shade (Beverly Wenhold)	Early TV Era	One-time NWA World Women's Tag Team Champion.	
4		2023	Marva Scott (Marva Wingo)	Early TV Era	One of the first African American female wrestlers.	
5		2023	Ethel Johnson (Ethel Blanche Wingo)	Early TV Era	The first African American female world champion. Two-time Colored Women's World Champion. One-time NWA World Women's Tag Team Champion.	
6		2023	Babs Wingo	Early TV Era	First African American female to wrestle integrated matches for promoter Billy Wolfe.	
7		2023	Donna Christanello (Mary Alfonsi)	Early TV Era	Tag team partner of co-inductee Toni Rose. Four-time NWA World Women's Tag Team Champion.	
7		2023	Toni Rose (Toni Rose)	Early TV Era	Tag team partner of co-inductee Donna Christanello. Five-time NWA World Women's Tag Team Champion.	
8		2023	Sue Green (Susan Tex Green)	Early TV Era	First openly gay female wrestler. Three-time PGWA Champion. One-time NWA World Women's Tag Team Champion.	
9		2023	Jazz (Carlene Denise Moore)	Modern TV Era	Two-time WWE Women's Champion. One-time NWA World Women's Champion.	
10		2023	Luna Vachon (Gertrude Elizabeth Vachon)	Modern TV Era	One-time LMLW World Champion. One-time USWA Women's Champion.	
11		2023	Madusa (Debrah Anne Miceli)	Modern TV Era	Three-time WWE Women's Champion. One-time AWA World Women's Champion.	
12		2023	Gorgeous Ladies of Wrestling	Modern TV Era	First all-female professional wrestling television series and promotion.	
13		2023	Rita Chatterton (Rita Marie Chatterton)	Modern TV Era	First female referee in WWE history.	
14		2023	Iryna Merleni (Iryna Oleksiyivna)	Internet Era	Gold medalist at the 2004 Summer Olympics.	
15		2024	Debbie Johnson	Early TV Era	Trainee of The Fabulous Moolah.	
16		2024	Afsoon Roshanzamir Johnson	Modern TV Era	Silver medalist at the 1990 World Wrestling Championships.	
17		2024	Missy Hyatt (Melissa Ann Hiatt)	Modern TV Era	First female commentator and influential valet.	
18		2024	Sherri Martel (Sherry Lynn Russell)	Modern TV Era	Three-time AWA World Women's Champion. One-time WWE Women's Champion.	
19		2024	Heidi Lee Morgan	Modern TV Era	One-time IWCCW Women's Champion.	
20		2024	Suzie Tanner	Modern TV Era	First licensed female referee.	
21		2024	Rockin' Robin (Robin Denise Smith)	Modern TV Era	One-time WWE Women's Champion. One-time LMLW International Champion. One-time UWF Women's World Champion.	
22		2024	Ladies Professional Wrestling Association	Modern TV Era	Influential all-female professional wrestling promotion.	
23		2024	Priscilla Gagné	Internet Era	Para judo silver medalist at the 2020 Summer Paralympics.	
24		2024	Clarissa Chun	Internet Era	First female wrestler from Hawaii to win a medal at the Olympics.	
25		2024	Texas Cowgirls (Joyce Grable and Wendi Richter)	Modern TV Era	Three-time NWA World Women's Tag Team Champions.	
26		2024	Jacqueline Moore	Modern TV and Internet Era	Two-time WWF Women's Champion. One-time WWE Cruiserweight Champion.	
27		2024	Lisa Marie Varon	Internet Era	Five-time TNA Knockouts Champion. One-time TNA Knockouts Tag Team Champion. Two-time WWE Women's Champion.	
28		2025	Agnieszka Wieszczek	Internet Era	First Polish woman to win an Olympic medal in women's freestyle wrestling.	
29		2025	Angelina Love (Lauren Williams)	Internet Era	Six-time TNA Women's Knockout Champion. One-time TNA Knockouts Tag Team Champion. One-time Women of Honor World Champion.	
30		2025	Chyna	Modern TV Era	Two-time WWF Intercontinental Champion, first woman to hold the title. One-time WWF Women's Champion.	
31		2025	La Dama Enmascarada (Magdalena Caballero)	Early TV Era	One-time and inaugural Mexican National Women's Champion.	
32		2025	Dark Journey (Lynda Newton)	Modern TV Era	Valet in the Universal Wrestling Federation and Jim Crockett Promotions.	
33		2025	Darling Dagmar (Kathy Moreland)	Early TV Era	Long-time participant in women's midget wrestling.	
34		2025	Dawn Marie (Kathy Moreland)	Modern TV Era	Valet in Extreme Championship Wrestling and World Wrestling Entertainment.	
35		2025	Debra Marshall	Modern TV Era	One-time WWF Women's Champion.	
36		2025	Desiree Petersen	Early TV Era	One-time WWF Women's Tag Team Champion.	
37		2025	Hollywood (Jeanne Marie Basone)	Modern TV Era	Castmember of Gorgeous Ladies of Wrestling.	
38		2025	Jumping Bomb Angels (Itsuki Yamazaki and Noriyo Tateno)	Modern TV Era	One-time WWWA World Tag Team Champions. One-time WWF Women's Tag Team Champions.	
39		2025	Kathleen Wimbley	Early TV Era	Territorial women's professional wrestler in the 1950s and 1960s.	
40		2025	Kristina Laum	Modern TV Era	Valet and professional wrestler in Extreme Championship Wrestling and World Championship Wrestling.	
41		2025	Kaori Icho	Internet Era	Ten-time amateur World Champion and four-time Olympic Champion.	
42		2025	Mercedes Martinez (Jazmin Benitez)	Internet Era	One-time ROH Women's World Champion.	
43		2025	Misty Blue Simmes (Diane Simmes)	Modern TV Era	One-time NWA United States Women's Champion.	
44		2025	Ramona Isabella	Early TV Era	Territorial women's professional wrestler from the 1960s to the 1980s.	
45		2025	Risako Kinjo	Internet Era	Two-time gold medalist at the Olympic Games, three-time gold medalist at the World Wrestling Championships and a four-time gold medalist at the Asian Wrestling Championships.	
46		2025	Sandy Parker	Early TV Era	One-time WWWA World Single Champion.	
47		2025	Saraya Knight (Julia Hamer-Bevis)	Modern TV and Internet Era	One-time Shimmer Champion.	
48		2025	Wingo Sisters (Babs Wingo, Ethel Johnson, and Marva Scott)	Early TV Era	Trailblazing African American women's professional wrestlers.	
49		2026	Gail Kim	Early TV Era	One-time WWE Women's Champion. Inaugural and seven-times TNA Knockouts Champion.	
50		2026	Melina Perez	Early TV Era	Three-time WWE Women's Champion. Three-time WWE Divas Champion.	
51		2026	Deb Malenko	Early TV Era	One-time AJW Champion. One-time AJW Tag Team Champion	
52		2026	Mimi Hagiwara	Early TV Era	Top star for All Japan Women's Pro Wrestling.	
53		2026	Linda Dallas	Early TV Era	One-time IWF Women's Champion.	
54		2026	Mickie Knuckles	Early TV Era	One-time OVW Women's Champion. One-time RPW Women's Champion	
55		2026	Penelope Paradise	Early TV Era	Trailblazing African American women's professional wrestlers.	
56		2026	Missy Sampson	Early TV Era	Had a 24-year in-ring career from 1995 to 2019.	

== WWHOF Awards ==
=== Amateur Wrestler of the Year ===
Year	Wrestler
2024	Justina Di Stasio
2025	Akari Fujinami

=== Coach of the Year ===
Year	Wrestler
2024	Paulina Biega
2025	Randi Miller

=== Pro Wrestler of the Year ===
Year	Wrestler	Promotion
2023	Kamille	National Wrestling Alliance
2024	Natalia Markova	National Wrestling Alliance
2025	Rhea Ripley	WWE
2025	Thunder Rosa	All Elite Wrestling

=== Tag Team Wrestlers of the Year ===
Year	Team	Promotion
2024	Miami's Sweet Heat (Laurie Carlson and Lindsey Carlson)	Women of Wrestling
2025	Miami's Sweet Heat (Laurie Carlson and Lindsey Carlson)	Women of Wrestling
2025	The Hex (Allysin Kay and Marti Belle)	Independent circuit

=== Most Improved Wrestler of the Year ===
Year	Wrestler	Promotion
2023	Jordynne Grace	Impact Wrestling
2024	Ruby Soho	All Elite Wrestling
2025	Tessa Blanchard	Total Nonstop Action Wrestling

=== Broadcaster of the Year ===
Year	Broadcaster	Promotion
2023	Velvet Sky	National Wrestling Alliance
2025	Samira	Independent circuit

=== Commentator of the Year ===
Year	Broadcaster	Promotion
2024	Nigel Sherrod	Women of Wrestling

=== Courage Award ===
Year	Inductee
2023	Dawn Whitham
2024	Athena H Gaskins
2025	Sis Sisaki

=== Pride Award ===
Year	Inductee
2024	Sonny Kiss

=== Most Inspirational Wrestler of the Year ===
Year	Wrestler	Promotion
2024	Gisele Shaw	TNA Wrestling

=== Historian Award ===
Year	Inductee
2023	Tom Burke
2024	Billy Corgan
2025	Ash Avildsen

=== Film/TV Award ===
Year	Inductee	Category
2023	Laurene Landon	Film

=== Journalism Award ===
Year	Inductee
2023	Jamie Hemmings
2024	Kimmy Sokol

=== Podcast of the Year Award ===
Year	Inductee
2024	The Mike Rand Show
2025	GAW TV
2025	Women's Wrestling Talk

=== Susan Tex Green Award ===
Year	Wrestler	Promotion
2025	Natalya	WWE
