= Donna Christanello =

American professional wrestler (1942–2011)

Personal information
- Born: Mary Alfosi; May 23, 1942 Pittsburgh, Pennsylvania, U.S.
- Died: August 25, 2011 (aged 69) Pittsburgh, Pennsylvania, U.S.

Professional wrestling career
- Ring name(s): Donna Christanello; Donna Christianello; Donna Christenello; Donna Christantello; Donna Christiantello; Princess White Cloud
- Billed height: 5 ft 8 in (173 cm)
- Billed weight: 135–145 lb (61–66 kg)
- Billed from: Pittsburgh, Pennsylvania
- Trained by: The Fabulous Moolah
- Debut: 1963
- Retired: 1991

Mary Alfonsi (May 23, 1942 – August 25, 2011), better known by her ring name Donna Christanello, was an American professional wrestler active between 1963 and 1991. Trained by The Fabulous Moolah, she frequently wrestled Ann Casey, Vicki Williams, Evelyn Stevens and Leilani Kai throughout the 1970s.

== Professional wrestling career ==
=== National Wrestling Alliance (1963–1984) ===
Christanello was employed at a restaurant in Pittsburgh when she decided to contact a wrestling promoter to become a professional wrestler. Male wrestlers Waldo Von Erich and Klondike Bill helped set her up with women's wrestling trainer The Fabulous Moolah. She moved to South Carolina in 1963 to train with Moolah. In 1969, Christanello competed during an Australian tour with Toni Rose, Jessica Rodgers, Betty and Rita Boucher, Ramona Isbell, Marva Scott and Evelyn Stevens.

She was the frequent tag team partner of Toni Rose. She and Rose won the National Wrestling Alliance's NWA Women's World Tag Team Championship in 1970. In 1972, she competed at the Superbowl of Wrestling, where she and Rose defended the time World Women's Tag Team Championship against Sandy Parker and Debbie Johnson. They eventually lost the title in October 1973 to Joyce Grable and Vicki Williams at Madison Square Garden in New York. There is also an unrecorded title change. Susan Green and Sandy Parker won the World Tag Team title from Christanello and Rose in November 1971 in Hawaii and lost them in February 1972 to Christanello and Rose in Hong Kong. They also defended the title in the NWA and American Wrestling Association, and the title was eventually integrated into the World Wrestling Federation (WWF). As a result, they were recognized as the first WWF Women's Tag Team Champions.

=== World Wrestling Federation (1965–1977, 1981–1987) ===
She made her debut in the World Wide Wrestling Federation in 1965. She worked there for many years until 1977.

Christianello returned to the WWWF now WWF in 1981. Christianello continued to wrestle in tag team matches. On May 5, 1984, Susan Starr and Christianello defeated Wendi Richter and Peggy Lee. On June 5, 1984, Peggy Lee and Christianello defeated The Fabulous Moolah and Desiree Petersen. The next day Moolah and Petersen defeated the team of Christianello and Judy Martin. On June 9, Moolah and Petersen defeated Martin and Christianello. The following day, Moolah and Petersen once again defeated Christianello and Judy Martin. In August 1984, Christianello wrestled primarily singles matches. On August 19, Susan Green defeated Christianello. In matches on both August 20 and 21, Susan Starr defeated Christianello.

During the mid-1980s she competed in the WWF's women's division. In 1987, she wrestled as part of Sensational Sherri's team at the Survivor Series pay-per-view. She retired from wrestling circa 1991.

== Personal life and death ==
Christanello was born and raised in Pittsburgh and was of Italian descent. She lived with The Fabulous Moolah on-and-off for forty years, ending in May 1999 when she moved back to Pittsburgh. While living with Moolah, she helped train women wrestlers Sherri Martel and Brittany Brown. After retiring from the ring, she was employed by Wal-Mart in the accounting department.

Her niece, Marie Minor, was trained by Christanello and worked as a wrestler under the ring name Angie Minelli for several years in the 1980s.

On August 25, 2011, she died from a chronic obstructive pulmonary disease (COPD). She was 69 years old.

== Championships and accomplishments ==
- Cauliflower Alley Club
  - Other honoree (1992)
- Keystone State Wrestling Alliance
  - Hall of Fame (2010)
- National Wrestling Alliance
  - NWA Women's World Tag Team Championship (4 times) – with Kathy O'Day (1) and Toni Rose (3)
- Professional Wrestling Hall of Fame and Museum
  - Lady Wrestler (2009)
- Women's Wrestling Hall of Fame
  - Class of 2023
