= Superbowl of Wrestling =

American professional wrestling show

The Superbowl of Wrestling was an event held in the 1970s. It was one of the first professional wrestling "Supercards".

== History ==
=== 1972 ===
Superbowl of Wrestling
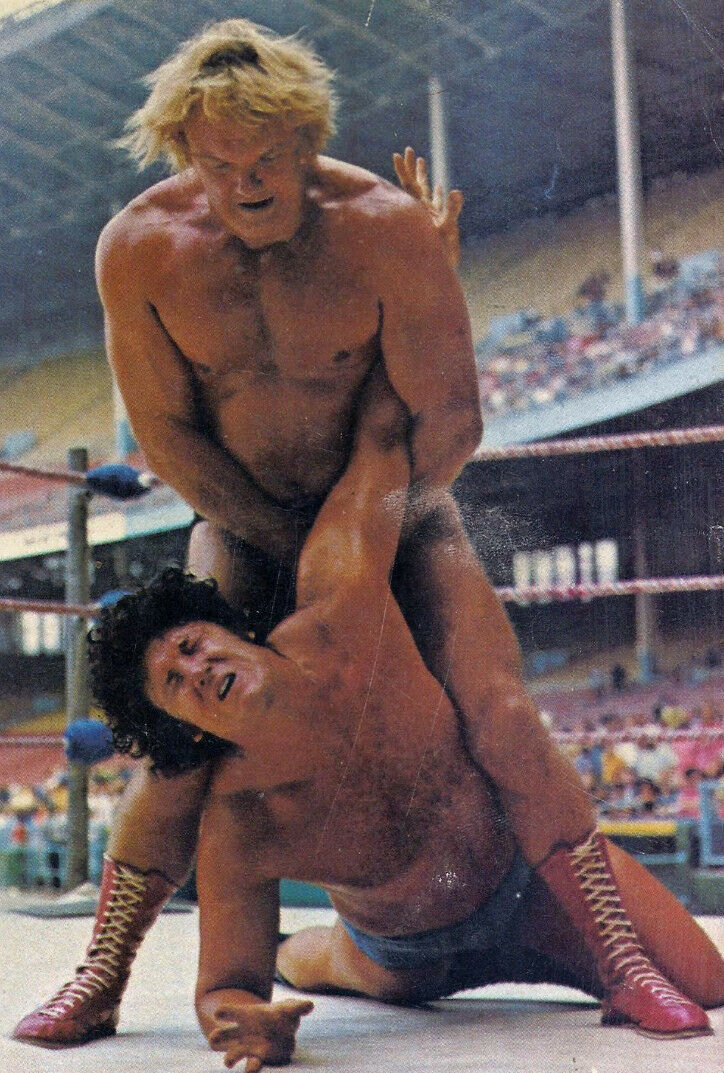
- Promotion(s): National Wrestling Alliance; National Wrestling Federation
- Date: August 12, 1972
- City: Cleveland, Ohio
- Venue: Municipal Stadium

The first Superbowl of Wrestling was held in Cleveland, Ohio at Municipal Stadium on August 12, 1972. Three rings were set up, side by side, and often more than one match would be going on at a time. Attendance figures have been estimated as high as 20,000 and as low as 5,000. No reliable sources seem to agree on a number.

Here are partial results of the show:

- Tony Marino & Tony Parisi defeated Motoji Okuma & Mashio Koma to win the tag team tournament
  - Tag team tournament opening round matches: Manuel Soto & Victor Rivera went to a double-DQ with Waldo Von Erich & Karl Von Stroheim, Tony Marino & Toni Parisi won by default. Luis Martinez & Sal Dominguez d. Tex McKenzie & Lil Abner.
  - Semifinals: Koma & Okuma d. Luis Martinez & Sal Dominguez.
  - Finals: Tony & Toni d. Koma & Okuma).
- Sue Green & Lily Thomas defeated Tippy Wells & Peggy Patterson to win the women's tag team tournament
- Sky Low Low & Little Brutus defeated Haiti Kid & Frenchy Lamont to win the midget tag team tournament
- NWF World Tag Team Champions the Fargo Brothers (Don & Johnny Fargo) defeated Wahoo McDaniel & Chief White Owl
- NWA Women's World Tag Team Champions Toni Rose & Donna Christanello defeated Sandy Parker & Debbie Johnson
- NWA World Women's Champion The Fabulous Moolah defeated Vicki Williams
- NWA United States Champion Bobo Brazil defeated Killer Tim Brooks
- Ernie Ladd vs. Abdullah the Butcher ended in a double disqualification
- NWF North American Champion Johnny Powers defeated Johnny Valentine

=== 1978 ===
Superbowl of Wrestling
- Promotion(s): National Wrestling Alliance; World Wide Wrestling Federation; Championship Wrestling from Florida
- Date: January 25, 1978
- City: Miami, Florida
- Venue: Miami Orange Bowl

Another Superbowl of Wrestling was held on January 25, 1978. This Superbowl of Wrestling was held at the Orange Bowl in Miami, Florida, drawing over 12,000 fans for a unification match between the WWWF and NWA World Championships. Here are the results:

- Rocky Johnson defeated Killer Karl Kox via DQ
- Ivan Putski defeated Ox Baker
- Joyce Grable won an eight-woman battle royal that also included Suzette Ferriera, Leilani Kai, Pepper LaBianca, Winona Littleheart, Tandy Rich, Terry Shane, and Vicki Williams
- Chavo Guerrero defeated Tank Patton
- Bobby Duncum defeated Don Serrano
- Keith Franks defeated John Ruffin
- Mike Graham & Steve Keirn defeated The Valiant Brothers (Jimmy & Johnny Valiant) to win the NWA Florida United States Tag Team Championship
- Pedro Morales defeated Lars Anderson
- Jack & Jerry Brisco defeated Ivan Koloff & Mr. Saito
- Dusty Rhodes defeated Ken Patera
- WWWF World Champion Superstar Billy Graham vs. NWA World Heavyweight Champion Harley Race ended in a 60-minute time-limit draw during a three-fall match
  - Gorilla Monsoon and Don Curtis were the special referees for the match, which saw Graham defeat Race via submission in the first fall; Race won the second fall at the 46 min mark with his trademark suplex.The 3rd fall was a bloody battle, with Race having Superstar in a sleeper hold in the last minute. Superstar was on his back, shoulders down, with ref Don Curtis counting to 1 when the 60 min time limit ran out; the match was tied at a fall each, and it was declared a draw.
