= EMLL Carnaval de Campeones =

Professional wrestling show

- Promotion: Empresa Mexicana de Lucha Libre
- Date: January 13, 1965
- City: Mexico City, Mexico
- Venue: Arena México

Event chronology
← Previous; EMLL 31st Anniversary Show	Next →: 9. Aniversario de Arena México

The EMLL Carnaval de Campeones (Spanish for the "EMLL Carnival of Champions") was a major professional wrestling event produced by Empresa Mexicana de Lucha Libre (EMLL) that took place on January 13, 1965, in EMLL's home arena Arena México in Mexico City, Mexico. As the name indicated most of the matches on the show, five out of six, featured a champion defending their championship against a chosen challenger. This was one of the few special, major shows promoted by EMLL outside of their annual EMLL Anniversary, Arena México Anniversary and Arena Coliseo Anniversary shows. The event featured a total of six professional wrestling matches, in which some wrestlers were involved in pre-existing scripted feuds or storylines. The wrestlers themselves portrayed either villains (referred to as "Rudos" in Mexico) or fan favorites ("Tecnicos" in Mexico) as they competed in matches with predetermined outcomes. On the undercard two championships from the Acapulco, Guerrero local promotion were defended in Mexico City despite it being outside the region where the championship was usually contested in. The fifth match of the night for the Mexican National Women's Championship was defended in Mexico City, which would be one of the last high profile women's wrestling matches in Mexico City as the Mexico City boxing and wrestling commission would ban women's wrestling from Mexico City a short while later, a band that was not lifted until 1986. In the fourth match of the night Rodolfo Ruiz defeated reigning Mexican National Lightweight Champion Chanoc to win his first of a record setting three Mexican National Lightweight Championships. In the main event Raúl Reyes defeated Ray Mendoza to win the Mexican National Light Heavyweight Championship, Reyes' only reign with the championship.

== Results ==
No.	Results	Stipulations
1	Johnny Ceballos defeated Ángel López	Best two-out-of-three falls match
2	El Capitán (c) defeated Abundio Radilla	Best two-out-of-three falls for the Acapulco Welterweight Championship
3	Rafael Salamanca (c) defeated Braulio Mendoza	Best two-out-of-three falls for the Acapulco Middleweight Championship
4	Rodolfo Ruíz defeated Chanoc (c)	Best two-out-of-three falls for the Mexican National Lightweight Championship
5	Chabela Romero (c) defeated Irma González	Best two-out-of-three falls for the Mexican National Women's Championship
6	Raúl Reyes defeated Ray Mendoza (c)	Best two-out-of-three falls for the Mexican National Light Heavyweight Championship
(c) / – the champion(s) heading into the match
