= Women's wrestling =

Women's wrestling may refer to

- Women's amateur wrestling
- Women's professional wrestling

== See also ==
- Wrestling
