= Toni Rose =

American professional wrestler (born 1945)

Personal information
- Born: December 22, 1945 (age 80) Terre Haute, Indiana, U.S.

Professional wrestling career
- Ring name: Toni Rose
- Billed height: 5 ft 5 in (165 cm)
- Billed weight: 143 lb (65 kg)
- Trained by: The Fabulous Moolah
- Debut: 1963

Toni Rose (born December 22, 1945) is an American retired professional wrestler. During her wrestling career, Rose captured the NWA World Women's Tag Team Championship on five occasions; three times with Donna Christanello, and twice with her trainer, The Fabulous Moolah. Rose is also a former one-time NWA Southern Women's Championship (Georgia version).

== Professional wrestling career ==
Rose grew up in Indianapolis, Indiana. She decided to become a professional wrestler at the age of seven, but first attended Terre Haute High School and college. She trained under The Fabulous Moolah in 1965. During her first match, which occurred in Atlanta, Georgia, her opponent Bambi Bell knocked Rose unconscious.

During a match in Australia in 1969, Rose was injured and left partially blind in one eye. In the early 1970s, Rose held the National Wrestling Alliance's NWA Women's World Tag Team Championship twice with The Fabulous Moolah. They first won the title in May 1970, but lost it to Donna Christanello and Kathy O'Day. During a rematch in June, Rose and Moolah regained the title. Later that November, Rose won the title, this time with Christanello. In 1972 at the Superbowl of Wrestling, they defended the World Women's Tag Team Championship against Sandy Parker and Debbie Johnson. During their reign, there was an unrecorded title change; Susan "Tex" Green and Parker won the title from Christanello and Rose in November 1971 in Hawaii, but they regained it in February 1972 in Hong Kong. After a three-year reign as champions, they were officially defeated for the title by the team of Joyce Grable and Vicki Williams on October 15, 1973, in New York City. It was not until October 1975 that Rose and Christanello regained the title from Grable and Williams, holding it for approximately four years.

During this time, she also wrestled against Susan "Tex" Green in Leroy McGuirk's promotion. During her career, Rose was also a contender for Moolah's NWA World Women's Championship, but never won the title. In December 1974, Rose was in a match to crown the vacated NWA United States Women's Championship, but lost to Ann Casey.

== Personal life ==
Rose cites Penny Banner as her favorite wrestler growing up, who she later became friend with. She was married to Jack Laughridge for nearly 35 years, until his death in 2016.

== Championships and accomplishments ==
- Carolina Wrestling Hall of Fame
  - Class of 2021
  - Lifetime Achievement Award (2021)
- National Wrestling Alliance
  - NWA Southern Women's Championship (Georgia version) (1 time)
  - NWA World Women's Tag Team Championship (5 times) – with Donna Christanello (3) and The Fabulous Moolah (2)
- Professional Wrestling Hall of Fame
  - Class of 2018
- Women's Wrestling Hall of Fame
  - Class of 2023
