= WWA World Women's Championship =

Professional wrestling women's championship

WWA World Women's Championship (Campeonato Mundial Feminil de WWA)

Details
- Promotion: World Wrestling Association (WWA)
- Date established: 1989
- Current champion(s): Lady Apache
- Date won: December 5, 2014

The WWA World Women's Championship (Campeonato Mundial Femilin de WWA in Spanish) is an inactive professional wrestling women's professional wrestling championship promoted by the Mexican wrestling promotion World Wrestling Association (WWA). The title was created in 1989 but not very often defended, from 1991 to 2003 and 2003 to 2014 no record of any title defenses have been found, the title may have been inactive in those periods. Lady Apache is the current champion.

As it was a professional wrestling championship, the championship was not won not by actual competition, but by a scripted ending to a match determined by the bookers and match makers. (Note: Hornbaker (2016) p. 550: "Professional wrestling is a sport in which match finishes are predetermined. Thus, win–loss records are not indicative of a wrestler's genuine success based on their legitimate abilities – but on now much, or how little they were pushed by promoters") On occasion the promotion declares a championship vacant, which means there is no champion at that point in time. This can either be due to a storyline, (Note: Duncan & Will (2000) p. 271, Chapter: Texas: NWA American Tag Team Title [World Class, Adkisson] "Championship held up and rematch ordered because of the interference of manager Gary Hart") or real life issues such as a champion suffering an injury being unable to defend the championship, (Note: Duncan & Will (2000) p. 20, Chapter: (United States: 19th Century & widely defended titles – NWA, WWF, AWA, IW, ECW, NWA) NWA/WCW TV Title "Rhodes stripped on 85/10/19 for not defending the belt after having his leg broken by Ric Flair and Ole & Arn Anderson") or leaving the company. (Note: Duncan & Will (2000) p. 201, Chapter: (Memphis, Nashville) Memphis: USWA Tag Team Title "Vacant on 93/01/18 when Spike leaves the USWA.")

== Title history ==
Key
No.	Overall reign number
Reign	Reign number for the specific champion
Days	Number of days held
N/A	Unknown information
(NLT)	Championship change took place "no later than" the date listed
†	Championship change is unrecognized by the promotion
+	Current reign is changing daily

No.	Champion	Championship change			Reign statistics		Notes	Ref.
No.	Champion	Date	Event	Location	Reign	Days	Notes	Ref.
1	Zuleyma	1989 (NLT)	Live event	N/A	1			(Note: Duncan & Will (2000) p. 401, Chapter: "Mexico: WWA Womens Title")
2	Lola Gonzales	July 20, 1989	Live event	Tijuana, Mexico	1			
3	Monster Ripper	December 1991 (NLT)	Live event	Hungary	1			
Championship history is unrecorded from December 1991 to March 23, 2003.
4	Ayako Hamada	March 23, 2003	Live event	N/A	1			
Championship history is unrecorded from March 23, 2003 to December 5, 2014.
5	Lady Apache	December 5, 2014	Live event	Tijuana	1	3,764+	Defeated Datura to win the vacant title.	
