= UWA World Women's Championship =

Professional wrestling women's championship

UWA World Women's Championship Campeonato Mundial Feminil de UWA

Details
- Promotion: Universal Wrestling Association; Mexican independent circuit
- Date established: December 9, 1979
- Date retired: 2003
Statistics
- First champion: Vickie Williams
- Most reigns: Lola González (4 Times)
- Longest reign: Zuleyma (3,849 days)
- Shortest reign: Miss Janeth (0 days)

The UWA World Women's Championship (Campeonato Mundial Feminil de UWA in Spanish) was a singles women's professional wrestling championship promoted by the Mexican Lucha Libre wrestling based promotion Universal Wrestling Association (UWA) from 1975 until the UWA closed in 1995 and since then defended on the Mexican independent circuit. Zuleyma was the reigning champion when UWA closed and she sporadically defended the title over the next 10 years, often with over a year between title defenses. The last champion was Miss Janeth with no recorded title defenses after 2003.

As it was a professional wrestling championship, the championship was not won not by actual competition, but by a scripted ending to a match determined by the bookers and match makers. (Note: Hornbaker (2016) p. 550: "Professional wrestling is a sport in which match finishes are predetermined. Thus, win–loss records are not indicative of a wrestler's genuine success based on their legitimate abilities – but on now much, or how little they were pushed by promoters") On occasion the promotion declares a championship vacant, which means there is no champion at that point in time. This can either be due to a storyline, (Note: Duncan & Will (2000) p. 271, Chapter: Texas: NWA American Tag Team Title [World Class, Adkisson] "Championship held up and rematch ordered because of the interference of manager Gary Hart") or real life issues such as a champion suffering an injury being unable to defend the championship, (Note: Duncan & Will (2000) p. 20, Chapter: (United States: 19th Century & widely defended titles – NWA, WWF, AWA, IW, ECW, NWA) NWA/WCW TV Title "Rhodes stripped on 85/10/19 for not defending the belt after having his leg broken by Ric Flair and Ole & Arn Anderson") or leaving the company. (Note: Duncan & Will (2000) p. 201, Chapter: (Memphis, Nashville) Memphis: USWA Tag Team Title "Vacant on 93/01/18 when Spike leaves the USWA.")

== Reigns ==
Key
No.	Overall reign number
Reign	Reign number for the specific champion
Days	Number of days held
N/A	Unknown information
†	Championship change is unrecognized by the promotion

No.	Champion	Championship change			Reign statistics		Notes	Ref.
No.	Champion	Date	Event	Location	Reign	Days	Notes	Ref.
1	Vickie Williams	December 9, 1979	Live event	Mexico City	1	14	Defeated Irma González to become first champion.	(Note: Duncan & Will (2000) p. 399, Chapter: MEXICO: UWA World Women's Title [Flores, Mora])
2	Estela Molina	December 23, 1979	Live event	Mexico City	1			
3	Vickie Williams	March 9, 1980	Live event	Monterrey, Nuevo León	2	77		
4	Irma González	May 25, 1980	Live event	N/A	1	133		
5	Vickie Williams	October 5, 1980	Live event	Mexico City	3	77		
6	Chabela Romero	December 21, 1980	Live event	Mexico City	1	119		
—	Vacated	April 19, 1981	—	—	—	—	Championship was vacated for undocumented reasons.	
7	Lola González	August 16, 1981	Live event	Mexico City	1	376	Defeated Vickie Williams to win the vacant title.	
8	Irma González	August 27, 1982	Live event	N/A	2	575		
9	Lola González	March 25, 1983	Live event	Puebla, Puebla	2	28		
10	Irma Aguilar	April 22, 1983	Nezahualcoyotl, Mexico	Live event	1	269		
11	Pantera Sureña	December 27, 1983	Live event	Puebla, Puebla	1	262		
12	Jaguar Yokota	September 17, 1984	Live event	Tokyo, Japan	1	209		
13	Lola González	April 14, 1985	Live event	Mexico City	3	618		
14	Shinobu Kandori	December 23, 1986	Live event	Tokyo, Japan	1			
—	Vacated	July 1987	—	—	—	—	Championship vacated when Shinobu Kandori left the promotion.	
15	Lola González	October 10, 1987	Live event	Tokyo, Japan	4	1,232	Defeated Harley Saito to win the vacant title.	
†	Zuleyma	February 23, 1991	Live event	Mexico City	1	3,849		
†	Miss Janeth	September 7, 2001	Live event	Monterrey, Nuevo León	1	0		
†	Ayako Hamada	September 7, 2001	Live event	Monterrey, Nuevo León	1			
†	Miss Janeth	2002	Live event	Monterrey, Nuevo León	2			
—		2003		—			Championship inactive from 2003 on	
