= Fritz Von Erich Retirement Show =

1982 major professional wrestling show

- Promotion: World Class Championship Wrestling
- Date: June 4, 1982
- City: Irving, Texas
- Venue: Texas Stadium
- Attendance: 6,800

Event chronology
← Previous; Wrestling Star Wars	Next → Wrestling Star Wars

The Fritz Von Erich Retirement Show was a major professional wrestling show held by World Class Championship Wrestling (WCCW) at the Texas Stadium on June 4, 1982. As the name indicates the show marked Fritz Von Erich's retirement from in ring competition after 29 years of active competition. His retirement came shortly after his promotion "Big Time Wrestling" was renamed "World Class Championship Wrestling" as they were making an attempt to expand to a national promotion. In the main event Fritz Von Erich defeated King Kong Bundy to win the NWA American Heavyweight Championship. After the match Von Erich vacated the American Heavyweight Championship. The show featured a total of nine matches. On the show David and Kevin Von Erich lost the WCCW All-Asia Tag Team Championship, which is not to be mistaken for the All Asia Tag Team Championship.

== Results ==
No.	Results	Stipulations	Times
1	The Spoiler defeated Frank Dusek	Singles match	05:31
2	Bill Irwin defeated Ken Mantell	Singles match	13:32
3	Lola Gonzales defeated Irma Gonzales	Singles match	09:58
4	Andre the Giant defeated Bugsy McGraw via disqualification	Singles match	—
5	El Solitario defeated Rene Guajardo (c)	Singles match for the NWA World Light Heavyweight Championship	10:12
6	Andre the Giant defeated Frank Dusek, Bill Irwin, Al Madril, Ken Mantell, Bugsy McGraw, The Spoiler, and T John Thibedeaux.	Bodyslam battle royal	—
7	The Great Kabuki and Magic Dragon defeated David and Kevin Von Erich (c)	Tag team match for the WCCW All-Asian Tag Championship	—
8	Kerry Von Erich defeated Harley Race	No Disqualification match	—
9	Fritz Von Erich defeated King Kong Bundy (c)	Falls count anywhere match for the NWA American Heavyweight Championship	08:32
(c) / – the champion(s) heading into the match
