= Joyce Grable =

American professional wrestler (1952–2023)

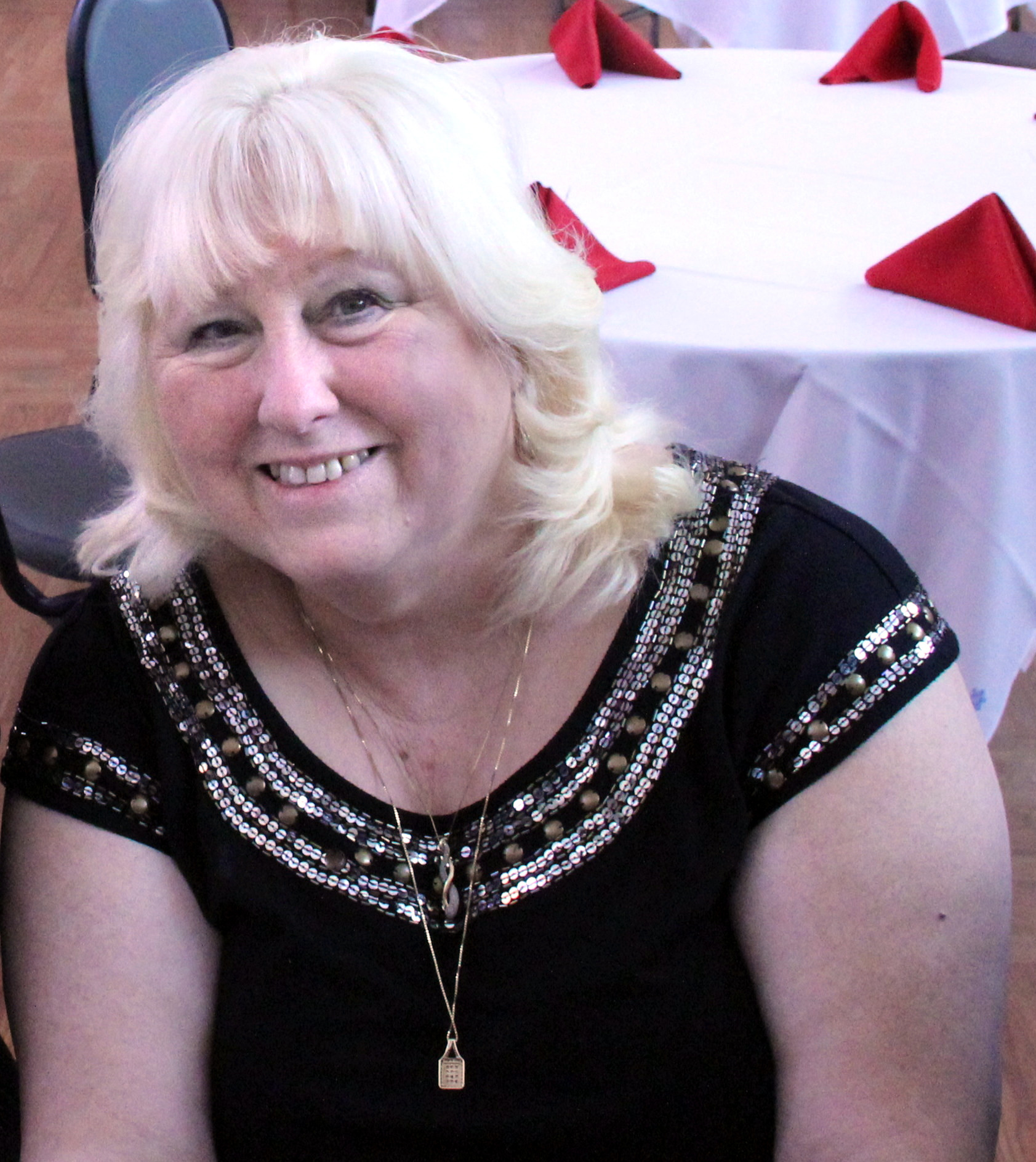
- Grable in 2012

Personal information
- Born: Betty Wade; November 9, 1952 LaGrange, Georgia, U.S.
- Died: September 29, 2023 (aged 70)
- Spouse: George Becker

Professional wrestling career
- Ring name: Joyce Grable
- Billed height: 5"5
- Billed weight: 121–154 lb (55–70 kg)
- Trained by: The Fabulous Moolah
- Debut: 1971
- Retired: 1991

Betty Wade-Murphy (November 9, 1952 – September 29, 2023), better known by her ring name Joyce Grable, was an American professional wrestler. She was the long-term tag team partner of Wendi Richter. She held the NWA United States Women's Championship once and the NWA Women's World Tag Team Championship six times—three with Richter and three with her other tag team partner Vicki Williams.

== Professional wrestling career ==
=== Training ===
Joyce Fowler (who also competed as Joyce Becker) was the first female wrestler to use the ring name "Joyce Grable". Fowler was active from 1963–1974 and then retired from professional wrestling to focus on her family. In the early 1970s, Betty Wade-Murphy was trained by professional wrestler Judy Grable (who was her childhood idol) to become a female wrestler. Upon her professional debut, she was given the ring name "Joyce Grable" both as a tribute to her idol and trainer, Judy Grable, and because Fabulous Moolah felt she bore a strong physical resemblance to the original Joyce Grable (portrayed by Fowler).

=== National Wrestling Alliance ===
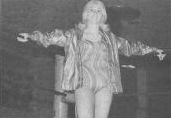
Grable in the ring, c. 1983

The team of Grable and Vicki Williams won the NWA Women's World Tag Team Championship from Donna Christanello and Toni Rose on October 15, 1973 in New York City. It was not until October 1975 that Rose and Christanello regained the title from Grable and Williams.

In 1978 at Superbowl of Wrestling II, she defeated seven other wrestlers in an eight-woman battle royal. Later that year, she defeated Ann Casey to win the NWA United States Women's Championship. In 1979, she helped train Judy Martin. In August 1979, the team of Grable and Williams defeated The Glamour Girls (Leilani Kai and Martin) to begin their second reign as NWA Women's Tag Champions. During the time period from 1973–1983, Grable frequently competed in the World Wrestling Federation, often in singles matches against WWF Women's Champion Fabulous Moolah and in tag team matches with Williams.

In 1982, Wendi Richter became her tag team partner after Grable trained her for six months in Atlanta, Georgia. She wrestled in a series of matches in Stampede Wrestling with partner Richter against Velvet McIntyre and Judy Martin. Joyce Grable also appeared in Puerto Rico for the World Wrestling Council. The teams continued their rivalry into April 1983 in Verne Gagne's American Wrestling Association. In May 1983, she returned to Stampede Wrestling, where she once again teamed with Richter against McIntyre and Penny Mitchell.

In 1986, Grable participated in a 10-woman battle royal at the American Wrestling Association's WrestleRock 86 event, losing to Sherri Martel. She continued to appear sporadically on the independent circuit and competed in the Delta Tiger Lilies promotion in 1988.

=== Retirement ===
Grable retired in 1991 and had back surgery. On January 29, 2005, Grable appeared at WrestleReunion managing Sherri Martel, Peggy Lee Leather, Krissy Vaine, and Amber O'Neal in an eight-woman tag team match against Wendi Richter, Bambi, Malia Hosaka, and Jenny Taylor. Grable continued to make appearances at wrestling reunions and conventions, as well as occasional independent shows. Grable appeared at a Magnificent Ladies Wrestling event on April 30, 2011, where she managed Melanie Cruise in a match against "Pryme Tyme" Amy Lee, and also managed Million Dollar Baby in a street fight against Robbie Rage. On May 20, 2011, she (along with several other retired professional wrestlers) was a guest at a Total Nonstop Action Wrestling live event in Amsterdam, New York.

== Personal life ==
Grable was originally from Columbus, Georgia. Grable had one biological son, Derek Murphy and a step daughter, Melissa Wade and stepson, Richard Wade from her second husband, Richard Wade's first marriage. She worked as a trainer at the women's wrestling training facility run by Fabulous Moolah and was responsible for training several notable female wrestlers, including Wendi Richter and Sherri Martel. After retiring from wrestling, Grable worked as a receptionist at a center for mentally and physically disabled people.

In 2013, Grable revealed she had cancer, prompting a benefit show to be held in Florida.

Joyce Grable died on September 29, 2023, at the age of 70. A few days earlier, her son had posted online that she was in hospice care.

== Championships and accomplishments ==
- Cauliflower Alley Club
  - Women's Wrestling Award (2010)
  - Courage Award (2022)
- Deep South Wrestling
  - DSW Women's Championship (1 time, final champion)
- National Wrestling Alliance
  - NWA Texas Women's Championship (1 time)
  - NWA United States Women's Championship (1 time)
  - NWA World Women's Tag Team Championship (6 times) – with Vicki Williams (3) and Wendi Richter (3)
  - NWA Hall of Fame (Class of 2012)
- Professional Wrestling Hall of Fame

- Class of 2013

- Pro Wrestling Illustrated
  - Girl Wrestler of the Year (1973)
- Pro Wrestling This Week
  - Wrestler of the Week (November 23–29, 1986)
- St. Louis Wrestling Hall of Fame
  - Class of 2022
- Women's Wrestling Hall of Fame
  - Class of 2024 – with Wendi Richter
