= Mimi Hagiwara =

Mimi Hagiwara is a Japanese singer, dancer and former professional wrestler. She was one of the top stars for All Japan Women's Pro Wrestling in the early 1980s. She made her acting debut in 1972 in Kamen Rider.

She was inducted in the Women's Wrestling Hall of Fame in 2026.
