= La Dama Enmascarada =

Mexican female professional wrestler

- Caballero wearing the mask and tights she wore for her matches

Personal information
- Born: Magdalena Caballero; July 22, 1925
- Died: March 11, 2006 (aged 80)
- Spouse: Andrés Ramos (m. 1940)
- Children: 6
- Family: Irma González (uncertain)

Professional wrestling career
- Ring name: La Dama Enmascarada
- Trained by: Jack O'Brien

Magdalena Caballero (July 22, 1925 – March 11, 2006) was a Mexican professional wrestler, commonly known under her ring name La Dama Enmascarada (Spanish for "The Masked Lady"). Caballero was a relative of professional wrestler Irma González, as well as González's daughter, Irma Aguilar, although it is unclear exactly how they were related.

Caballero was one of the pioneers of women's professional wrestling in Mexico, credited as the first Mexican National Women's Champion at a time when female wrestling was banned in Mexico City. She began her career as a masked wrestler, but lost her mask in 1958 to Irma González, and would later wrestle under the mask again. She also appeared in three luchador films: Las Lobas del Ring, Las Luchadoras contra La Momia and Las Luchadoras contra el Médico Asesino.

== Professional wrestling career ==
Women's professional wrestling in Mexico prior to the 1950s was almost non-existent. In the early 1950s, Jack O'Brien began training female wrestlers in his gym in León, Guanajuato, including Magdalena Caballero. In the ring, she would work under a wrestling mask, using the ring name La Dama Enmascarada ("The Masked Lady") alongside other O'Brien trainees like Chabela Romero, La Enfermera, Irma González, and Rosita Williams. Her first verified match took place on November 16, 1951, where she wrestled La Enfermera del Médico Asesino in a Lucha de Apuestas ("bet match"), which ended without a winner, meaning that La Dama Enmascarada kept her mask safe, while La Enfermera kept her hair.

In 1955, La Dama Enmascarada became the first woman to win a championship in Mexico, winning a tournament to become the first holder of the Mexican National Women's Championship. Her reign lasted less than a year, as Irma González won the championship in 1955. La Dama Enmascarada regained the championship in 1958. The rivalry between La Dama and González led to a high-profile Lucha de Apuestas between the two on October 5, 1958. González won the match and, in addition to not having her hair shaved off, forced La Dama Enmascarada to remove her mask instead. As a result, La Dama Enmascarada became the first woman in Mexico to unmask as a result of a Lucha de Apuestas loss. After the loss of her mask, she would occasionally wrestle under her real name and sometimes still used the "La Dama Enmascarada" name, despite her unmasking. Due to very few records of wrestling from that period of time being preserved, it is uncertain as to who defeated La Dama to end her second reign as the Mexican National Women's Champion. On January 22, 1961, La Dama Enmascarada defeated González in yet another Lucha de Apuestas, forcing González to be shaved bald as a result.

La Dama Enmascarada's last known match took place in 1962, on January 14, as she teamed up with Chabela Romero to take on Irma González and Toña la Tapatía at an Empresa Mexicana de Lucha Libre (EMLL) show in Guadalajara; it ended with no clear winners. Her career in Mexico ended when she began touring Europe as part of a traveling circus for the subsequent ten years.

== Personal life ==
Magdalena Caballero was born on July 22, 1925, in Mexico City. She was born into a circus family as both her parents and her grandmother all performed in various acts. Caballero's grandmother encouraged her to become a strong woman, focusing on feats of dental strength in her performances. With this background, local boxing promoters offered her several boxing matches.

At the age of 15, Caballero met her future husband, Andrés Ramos, who was an animal trainer with the circus. The two later married and had six children together: Manuel, Francisca, Arturo, Andrés, Magdalena and Teresa. The two would later divorce in the 1950s, leaving Caballero alone to fend for herself and her six children. Her sister would also become a professional wrestler, known as María de Jesús Caballero. She is also related to González, who began wrestling around the same time as Caballero, although it is not clear exactly how they are related. González's daughter would also later become a professional wrestler, known as Irma Aguilar.

Magdalena Caballero died on March 11, 2006, at the age of 80; no cause of death was published.

== Champions ==
- Mexican independent circuit

- Mexican National Women's Championship (1 time)

- Women's Wrestling Hall of Fame
  - Class of 2025 (Posthumous inductee)

== Filmography ==
Caballero appeared as an actress in a supporting role, as well as being the fight coordinator for the female wrestlers in the following movies:

- Las Luchadoras cotra el Médico Asesino ("Wrestling Women versus the Medical Assassin", 1963) aka. The Doctor of Doom
- Las Luchadoras contra La Momia ("Wrestling Women versus the Aztec Mummy", 1964)
- Las Lobas del Ring ("The she-wolves of the Ring", 1965)

== Luchas de Apuestas record ==
Winner (wager)	Loser (wager)	Location	Event	Date	Notes
Irma González (hair)	La Dama Enmascarada (mask)	Torreón, Coahuila	N/A	September 5, 1958	
La Dama Enmascarada (hair)	Irma González (hair)	Guadalajara, Jalisco	N/A	January 22, 1961	
