= Irma González (wrestler) =

Mexican female professional wrestler

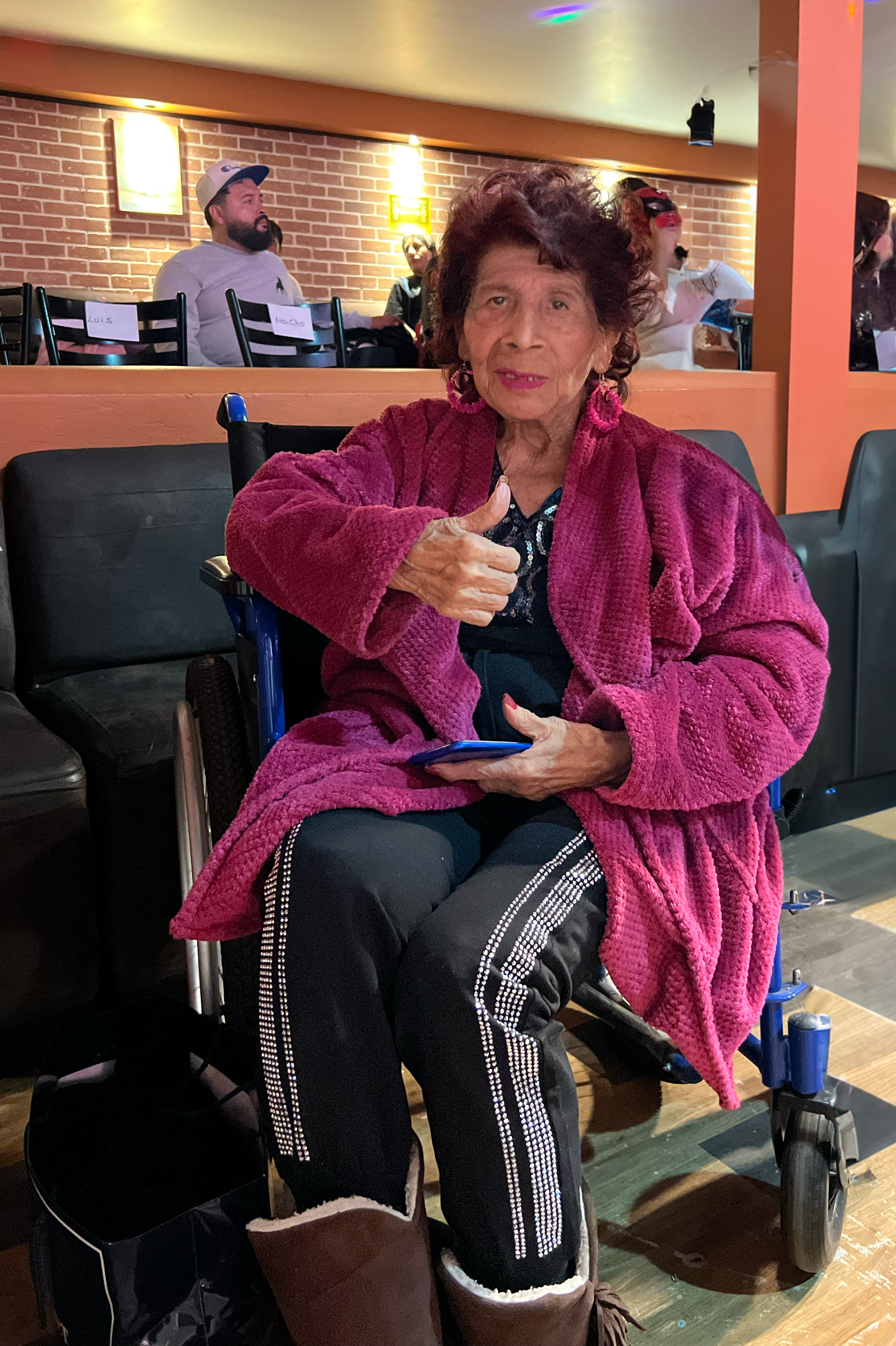
- González in 2024

Personal information
- Born: Irma Morales Muñoz; August 20, 1936 (age 89)
- Children: Irma Aguilar (daughter)
- Relatives: Reyna González (sister); Hara Kiri (ex-son-in-law)

Professional wrestling career
- Ring names: Irma González; Flor Negra; Rosa Blanca; La Tirana; La Dama del Enfermero; La Enfermera; La Novia del Santo
- Billed height: 1.56 m (5 ft 1 in)
- Billed weight: 70 kg (154 lb)
- Trained by: Jorge Rojas; Tarzán López; Gory Guerrero; Jack O'Brien; Raúl Romero
- Debut: August 20, 1955
- Retired: 1996

Achievements and titles

Irma Morales Muñoz (born August 20, 1936), best known by her ring name Irma González, is a Mexican retired professional wrestler. During her over forty-year career, from the 1950s to the 1990s, she also competed at various times under the masked characters Flor Negra ("Black Flower"), Rosa Blanca ("White Rose"), La Tirana ("The Tyrant"), La Dama del Enfermero ("The Nurse Lady"), La Enfermera ("The Nurse") and La Novia del Santo ("The Bride of El Santo").

She is one of the pioneers of women's professional wrestling in Mexico, part of the first wave of Mexican women who made their debuts in the early 1950s, at a time when virtually no women's matches were promoted in the country. She is a five-time holder of the Mexican National Women's Championship, a two-time winner of the UWA World Women's Championship, and won both a US-based and an Indonesian-based world championship. She and her daughter Irma Aguilar were the first team to win the Mexican National Women's Tag Team Championship when it was introduced in 1990.

In 2020, she was selected as The Greatest Female Wrestler in Lucha Libre History by LuchaWorld; lucha libre is the name given to the style of professional wrestling that originated in Mexico.

== Professional wrestling career ==
Women's wrestling in Mexico prior to the 1950s was almost non-existent, with no known matches taking place from 1945 on and very few prior to that. In the early 1950s Jack O'Brien began training female wrestlers, including Irma Morales, in his gym in León, Guanajuato. Morales worked under the ring name Irma González alongside other O'Brien trainees such as Chabela Romero, La Enfermera, La Dama Enmascarada, and Rosita Williams.

On February 28, 1955, González defeated La Dama Enmascarada to win the Mexican National Women's Championship, becoming the second overall champion. Her reign lasted for 489 days, until Rosita Williams won the championship on June 12, 1956. González regained the championship in 1958, although records are unclear as to whom she defeated to win the title. Her second reign ended when she lost to La Dama Enmascarada on September 28, 1958. The rivalry between González and La Dama Enmascarada led to the first decisive Lucha de Apuestas ("betting match") in Mexico, 18 years after the first one took place. The match saw González defeat La Dama, forcing her to unmask and reveal her real name as required by the rules, making her the first woman to do so in Mexico. González had a third reign with the championship in 1959. Records indicate that she held and defended the championship, but not who she fought to win it or to whom she lost it. In the late 1950s, Ernesto P. Uruchurtu, Regent of Mexico City, banned women's wrestling in the city, effectively relegating women to minor shows in other Mexican states. In 1961, La Dama Enmascarada once again wrestled González in a Lucha de Apuestas, defeating her and forcing González to have all of her hair shaved off as a result.

In the early 1960s, Morales became engaged and promised her fiancé that she would stop wrestling. Instead of retiring, Morales began working under a mask, using a ring character named "La Novia del Santo" ("The Bride of El Santo"), wearing El Santo's signature silver mask. Morales obtained El Santo's blessing to use the name, making her the only non-family member ever to be given the right to use the Santo name. Morales wrestled as "La Novia del Santo" for seven months until she married and temporarily retired. It is unclear for how long she was retired, but records indicate that González lost the Mexican National Women's Championship to Chabela Romero at an Empresa Mexicana de Lucha Libre (EMLL) show in Guadalajara. She also won the mask of La India at a show in Torreón. On January 13, 1965, at Carnaval de Campeones ("Carnival of Champions"), Romero successfully defended the women's championship against González. During the 1960s and 1970s, Morales worked as various masked wrestlers, including "Flor Negra" ("Black Flower"), "Rosa Blanca" ("White Rose"), "La Tirana" ("The Tyrant"), "La Dama del Enfermero" ("The Nurse Lady"), and "La Enfermera" ("The Nurse"). In the 1970s, she focused more on storyline rivalries instead of championship matches, especially against her longtime rival Chabela Romero. The two met in three separate Lucha de Apuestas matches through the 1970s, in 1971, 1974 and 1979, with González emerging victorious each time.

On May 25, 1980, González defeated US-born Vicki Williams to win the Universal Wrestling Association (UWA)'s Women's World Championship for the first time. Her initial reign lasted 133 days, until October 5, when Williams regained the championship. At some point in 1980, González also won the Mexican National Women's Championship again, but records are unclear who she took the title from; they do indicate that Rossy Moreno won the championship from González in 1980. In 1981, González won the mask of Martha la Sarapera, as well as Martha's hair in 1982. That same year also saw González defeat La Mujer X at a regional show in Xalapa to unmask her. She also won the UWA World Women's Championship for a second time, defeating Lola González on August 27, 1982. Her 210-day reign ended on May 25, 1983, when González regained the championship.

Records indicate that González once again held the Mexican National Women's Championship in 1986, but the details are scarce. Later that year, women's wrestling was allowed in Mexico City once more, bringing González and others back to the nation's capital. In August 1990, González and her daughter, Irma Aguilar, became the first team to win the Mexican National Women's Tag Team Championship, defeating Neftali and Satanakia in a tournament final. The mother/daughter duo held the championship for 497 days, until December 20, 1991, when the team of Martha Villalobos and Pantera Sureña defeated them for it. On June 10, 1995, at age 59, González, Irma Aguilar and La Sierenita competed in the first match of Triplemanía III-A, AAA's biggest show of the year, losing to Neftali, La Nazi and Villalobos. Her last confirmed match took place on April 13, 1996, at a Promo Azteca show in Mexico City. She teamed up with her daughter to defeat La Chola and La Rebelde.

== Championships and accomplishments ==
- Empresa Mexicana de Lucha Libre

- Mexican National Women's Championship (7 times)
- Mexican National Women's Tag Team Championship (1 time, first) – with Irma Aguilar
- Homenaje a Dos Leyendas honoree (2023)

- Universal Wrestling Association

- UWA World Women's Championship (2 times)

- Other

- World Women's Championship (US version) (1 time)
- World Women's Championship (Indonesia version) (1 time)

== Luchas de Apuestas record ==
Winner (wager)	Loser (wager)	Location	Event	Date	Notes
Irma González (hair)	La Dama Enmascarada (mask)	Torreón, Coahuila	N/A	October 5, 1958	
La Dama Enmascarada (hair)	Irma González (hair)	Guadalajara, Jalisco	N/A	January 22, 1961	
Irma González (hair)	La India (mask)	Torreón, Coahuila	N/A	August 18, 1963	
Chabela Romero (hair)	Irma González (hair)	Panama	N/A	N/A	
Irma González (hair)	Chabela Romero (hair)	Torreón, Coahuila	N/A	June 20, 1971	
Irma González (hair)	Charito Silva (hair)	Xalapa, Veracruz	N/A	1972	
Irma González (hair)	Chabela Romero (hair)	Pachuca, Hidalgo	N/A	January 16, 1974	
Irma González (hair)	Chela Salazar (hair)	N/A	UWA show	1977	
Irma González (hair)	Chabela Romero (hair)	Naucalpan, State of Mexico	UWA show	February 25, 1979	
Irma González (hair)	Martha La Saraphea (hair)	N/A	N/A	1981	
Irma González (hair)	Martha La Saraphea (hair)	Monterrey, Baja California	N/A	1982	
Irma González (hair)	La Mujer X (mask)	Xalapa, Veracruz	N/A	1982	
Irma González (hair)	La Rebelde (mask)	Cuchillo, Mexico	N/A	1992	
