= James Heywood Allen =

American sports promoter (1881–1958)

James Heywood Allen (1881 – January 9, 1958) was an American sports promoter.

== Life and career ==
Allen was born in 1881 in St. Louis, Missouri. During the 1930s, he established the Allen Athletic Club in Louisville, Kentucky, and began promoting boxing and professional wrestling. He notably operated the Midwest Wrestling Alliance between 1935 and 1947.

He died January 9, 1958, in Madison, Indiana.
