= Miss Janeth =

Mexican professional wrestler (1973–2025)

Personal information
- Born: Janet Fragoso Alonso; January 14, 1973 Mexico City, Mexico
- Died: December 17, 2025 (aged 52)

Professional wrestling career
- Ring name(s): Miss Janeth; Janeth
- Billed height: 1.65 m (5 ft 5 in)
- Billed weight: 66 kg (146 lb)
- Trained by: Zuleyma; Raúl Reyes; Pepe Casas
- Debut: February 25, 1990

Janet Fragoso Alonso (January 14, 1973 – December 17, 2025) was a Mexican professional wrestler, known by her ringname Miss Janeth, who was a longtime ruda for Asistencia Asesoría y Administración. She also competed in the Universal Wrestling Association and won the UWA World Women's Championship following its revival in 2001. Fragoso was the younger sister of luchadora Zuleyma.

== Career ==
Fragoso's career with the promotion stretches back to the early 1990s, her first major victory in the promotion being a "hair vs. hair" match against Migala in 1996, however she remained at a mid-card level for much of her time in the AAA's women's division. Another highlight in her early career occurred two years later when she and Alda Moreno beat Rosy Moreno and Xóchitl Hamada in a "hair vs. hair" match at Verano de Escandalo (1998) when Janeth pinned Rosy Moreno.

The next year, Janeth entered Reina de Reina 1999 and in the opening rounds defeated Lady Discovery, Princess Sujei and Migala in a "four-way" elimination match. In the finals, she lost to Xochitl Hamada in a similar match which included Esther and Rosy Moreno. Her appearance at Verano de Escandalo (1999) saw her team with rivals Rosy Moreno and Xochitl Hamada to beat Cinthia, Alda & Esther Moreno. Another trios match with Tiffany and Rosy Moreno at Guerra de Titanes 1999 resulted in a loss to Faby Apache, Alda & Cinthia Moreno.

She entered the Reina de Reina 2000 defeating Alda Moreno in the opening rounds but lost to Martha Villalobos in the semi-finals. At Verano de Escandalo (2000), she teamed with Aja Kong and Tiffany in a trios tag team match who lost to Alda Moreno, Lady Apache and Ayako Hamada on September 29, 2000. On September 7, 2001, she won the revived UWA World Women's Championship in Nuevo Leon, Mexico. The title had last been won by her sister ten years before. She briefly lost the title to Ayako Hamada on March 8, 2002, but regained it later that year. Janeth also participated in the Reina de Reinas 2001 and 2002 tournaments making it to the finals in both events.

Janeth finally got her moment in the spotlight by winning the Reina de Reinas 2006 tournament defeating Martha Villalobos, Cynthia Moreno and La Diabólica in the four-way elimination finals. The next month at Rey de Reyes (2006), she teamed with Lola Gonzales, Cinthia Moreno and Martha Villalobos in an 8-woman tag team match against Chikayo Nagashima, La Diabolica, Tiffany and Carlos Amano, but lost the match when her team was disqualified. After this point, she and the other luchadoras were gradually phased out with the promotion focusing on the Apache family storyline. In early 2007, Janeth formed a team with Tiffany and Rosy Moreno known as Las Brujas, but the group was short-lived and disappeared from AAA after only a few episodes. She made her last AAA appearance that year reaching the tournament finals at the Reina de Reinas 2007 on March 25, though it was unclear whether she has left the company or was just on hiatus for personal reasons.

== Death ==
Fragoso died on December 17, 2025, at the age of 52. News of her death was originally reported by Lola González.

== Championships and accomplishments ==
- Asistencia Asesoría y Administración

- AAA Reina de Reinas Championship (1 time)
- Reina de Reinas tournament (2006)

- Universal Wrestling Association

- UWA World Women's Championship (2 time)

== Luchas de Apuestas record ==
Winner (wager)	Loser (wager)	Location	Event	Date	Notes
Miss Janeth (hair)	La Practicante (hair)	N/A	Live event	N/A	
Miss Janeth (hair)	La Nazi (hair)	N/A	Live event	N/A	
Miss Janeth (hair)	Thunder Crack (mask)	Japan	Live event	N/A	
Miss Janeth (hair)	Migala (hair)	Mexico City	Live event	August 16, 1996	
Miss Janeth (hair)	Rossy Moreno (hair)	Ciudad Madero, Mexico	Verano de Escándalo (1998)	September 18, 1998	(Note: This was a tag team match between Miss Janeth and Alda Moreno against Rosy Moreno and Xóchitl Hamada.)
