= Chabela Romero =

Mexican female professional wrestler

- Romero in 1956

Personal information
- Born: Isabela Romero Rangel; September 11, 1936 Serdan, Puebla, Mexico
- Died: April 19, 1985 (aged 48)
- Spouse: Destino Negro (husband)

Professional wrestling career
- Ring name: Chabela Romero
- Billed height: 1.65 m (5 ft 5 in)
- Billed weight: 73 kg (161 lb)
- Trained by: Jose Rojas; Fantasma de la Quebrada
- Debut: March 27, 1955

Isabela "Chabela" Romero Rangel (September 11, 1936 – April 19, 1985) was a Mexican professional wrestler. She was one of the first Mexican women to become a professional wrestler when women became a regular fixture in the early 1950s. During her career, she won the Mexican National Women's Championship three times, and both the UWA World Women's Championship and the Japanese All Pacific Championship once.

== Professional wrestling career ==
Women's wrestling in Mexico prior to the 1950s was almost non-existent, with no known matches taking place from 1945 on and very few prior to that. In the early 1950s, Jack O'Brien began training female wrestlers, including Isabela Romero, in his gym in León, Guanajuato. She would work under the ring name Chabela Romero alongside other O'Brien trainees such as Irma González, La Enfermera, La Dama Enmascarada, and Rosita Williams. She made her in-ring debut on March 27, 1955, participating in an all-female tournament in Mexico City.

Romero won her first Mexican National Women's Championship at some point in the late 1950s, 1958 at the latest. Due to minimal written documentation from the time period, it is uncertain as to who Romero won the championship from, nor who she lost it to. Records indicate that she started her second reign on December 6, 1965. From 1965 to 1966, Romero was involved in a storyline feud with Jarocita Rivero, which saw the two women trade the championship, first on May 12, 1966, and then back to Romero on August 11 of the same year. During the feud, Rivero defeated Romero in a Lucha de Apuestas ("bet match"), which forced Romero to have all her hair shaved off as a result of the match stipulation. Records are uncertain as to when Romero's third and final reign as the Mexican National Women's Championship ended, as records are missing from late 1966 through 1980.

Over the years, Chabela Romero had a long running storyline feud with Irma González, which included several Lucha de Apuestas matches between the two. Romero lost to González on June 20, 1971, and again on January 17, 1974, both times leaving the ring without hair. On November 1, 1975, Romero ended up winning the mask of Princesa Azul. At some point in the 1970s, Romero gained a measure of revenge as she defeated González in a Lucha de Apuestas in Panama. The two ladies also took their feud to Japan, working for All Japan Women's Pro-Wrestling for several tours throughout the mid-to-late-1970s. On May 20, 1978, Romero defeated Maki Ueda in the finals of a tournament to win the vacant All Pacific Championship. She held the title for 81 days, before losing it to Ueda in Tokyo. On February 25, 1979, González defeated Romero in their fourth and last Lucha de Apuestas at a Universal Wrestling Association (UWA) show. Romero then became involved in a feud with Vicki Williams, in which Romero defeated Williams to win the UWA World Women's Championship. The championship change led to a Lucha de Apuestas between the two as well, with Williams pinning Romero, forcing her to be shaved bald afterward. Romero ended up vacating the UWA World Women's Championship on April 19, 1981, for undocumented reasons.

== Death ==
Romero died on April 19, 1985, at the age of 48.

== Championships and accomplishments ==
- All Japan Women's Pro-Wrestling

- All Pacific Championship (1 time)

- Empresa Mexicana de Lucha Libre

- Mexican National Women's Championship (3 times)

- Universal Wrestling Association

- UWA World Women's Championship (1 time)

== Luchas de Apuestas record ==
Winner (wager)	Loser (wager)	Location	Event	Date	Notes
Chabela Romero (hair)	Irma González (hair)	Panama	show	N/A	
Jarocita Rivero (hair)	Chabela Romero (hair)	N/A	show	1965 or 1966	
Irma González (hair)	Chabela Romero (hair)	Torreón, Coahulia	show	June 20, 1971	
Irma González (hair)	Chabela Romero (hair)	Paducha, Mexico	show	January 17, 1974	
Chabela Romero (hair)	Princesa Azul (mask)	Monterrey, Baja California	show	November 1, 1975	
Irma González (hair)	Chabela Romero (hair)	Naucalpan, State of Mexico	UWA show	February 25, 1979	
Vicki Williams (hair)	Chabela Romero (hair)	N/A	UWA show	November 25, 1979	

== Filmography ==
- Doctor Doom (1963) (original title: Las luchadoras contra el médico asesino) as Carmela Camacho "Vendetta"
- Wrestling Women vs. the Aztec Mummy (1964) (original title: Las luchadoras contra la momia) as herself
- She-Wolves of the Ring (1965) (original title: Las lobas del ring ) as herself
