= Zuleyma =

Mexican female professional wrestler

Personal information
- Born: Elvia Fragoso Alonso; January 13, 1964 (age 62) Mexico

Professional wrestling career
- Ring name(s): Zuleyma; La Enfermera
- Billed height: 5 ft 4 in (1.63 m)
- Billed weight: 144 lb (65 kg)
- Trained by: El Enfermero; Antonio Camargo; Indio Yoko
- Debut: March 11, 1979
- Retired: 1997

Elvia Fragoso Alonso (born January 13, 1964) is a Mexican former professional wrestler, known by her ringname Zuleyma, who competed in the Universal Wrestling Association and the World Wrestling Association as one of the most dominant female wrestlers in Mexico during the 1980s and early 1990s. She is the real-life older sister of professional wrestler Miss Janeth, whom she helped train, She married Kato Kung Lee, Jr., son of veteran rudo (heel) Kato Kung Lee.

On March 30, 1988, Zuleyma won to La Briosa in a tournament final for the Mexican National Women's Championship. She lost the title to La Marquesa on August 8, 1989, but regained it in Mexico City on March 30, 1990.

In early 1989, Zuleyma became the first WWA World Women's Championship and eventually lost the title to Lola Gonzales in Tijuana on July 20, 1989. She eventually defeated Gonzales for the UWA World Women's Championship in Mexico City on February 23, 1991, and immediately vacated the Mexican National title after a near two-year reign. Zuleyma defended the title against Martha Villalobos at the Katsushika Sports Center on September 19, 1992, and held the championship until around 1995 when the title became inactive.

She also had a successful career overseas in the Japanese promotion W*ING during the mid-to late 1990s. In one of her first tours of Japan, she appeared on a televised match for the joshi promotion All Japan Women's Pro-Wrestling where she teamed with Bull Nakano and Chela Salazar against Devil Masami, Mika Komatsu & Kanako Nagatomo on March 20, 1986. She later returned to Japan in 1993 and had a series of matches against Jannet Ryo which were later released on VHS/DVD by the promotion, most notably, a mixed tag team match with her and Masayoshi Motegi against Ryo and The Winger at Tokyo's Korakuen Hall on February 15, 1994. On February 23, 1995, she appeared on the debut show for Tokyo Pro in Shizuoka in a mixed tag team match with Apollo Sugawara against Electra and Kishin Kawabata.

On March 29, 2008, she made a one-time appearance with her husband at a Ladies of Wrestling tribute show for Dona Chela Salazar in Chicago, Illinois. At the event, they defeated La Sirenita and El Dorado in a best of three falls mixed tag team match.

== Championships and accomplishments ==
- Comisión de Box y Lucha Libre Mexico D.F.

- Mexican National Women's Championship (2 times)

- Universal Wrestling Association

- UWA World Women's Championship (1 time)

- World Wrestling Association

- WWA World Women's Championship (1 time, first)

- Other titles

- Mexico State Women's Championship (1 time)

== Lucha de Apuesta record ==
Winner (wager)	Loser (wager)	Location	Event	Date	Notes
Zuleyma (hair)	Martha Villalobos (hair)	N/A	Live event	N/A	
Zuleyma (hair)	La Diosa de Plata (hair)	Panama	Live event	N/A	
Zuleyma (hair)	Tania (hair)	Guadalajara, Jalisco	Live event	N/A	
Zuleyma (hair)	La Marqueza (hair)	Guadalajara, Jalisco	Live event	N/A	
Zuleyma (hair)	Yumiko (hair)	Japan	Live event	N/A	
Zuleyma (hair)	Melina (hair)	Japan	Live event	N/A	
Lola Gonzales (hair)	Zuleyma (hair)	N/A	Live event	N/A	
Zuleyma (hair)	Pantera Sureña (hair)	Mexico City	Live event	March 3, 1991	
