= Vicki Williams =

American professional wrestler (born 1956)

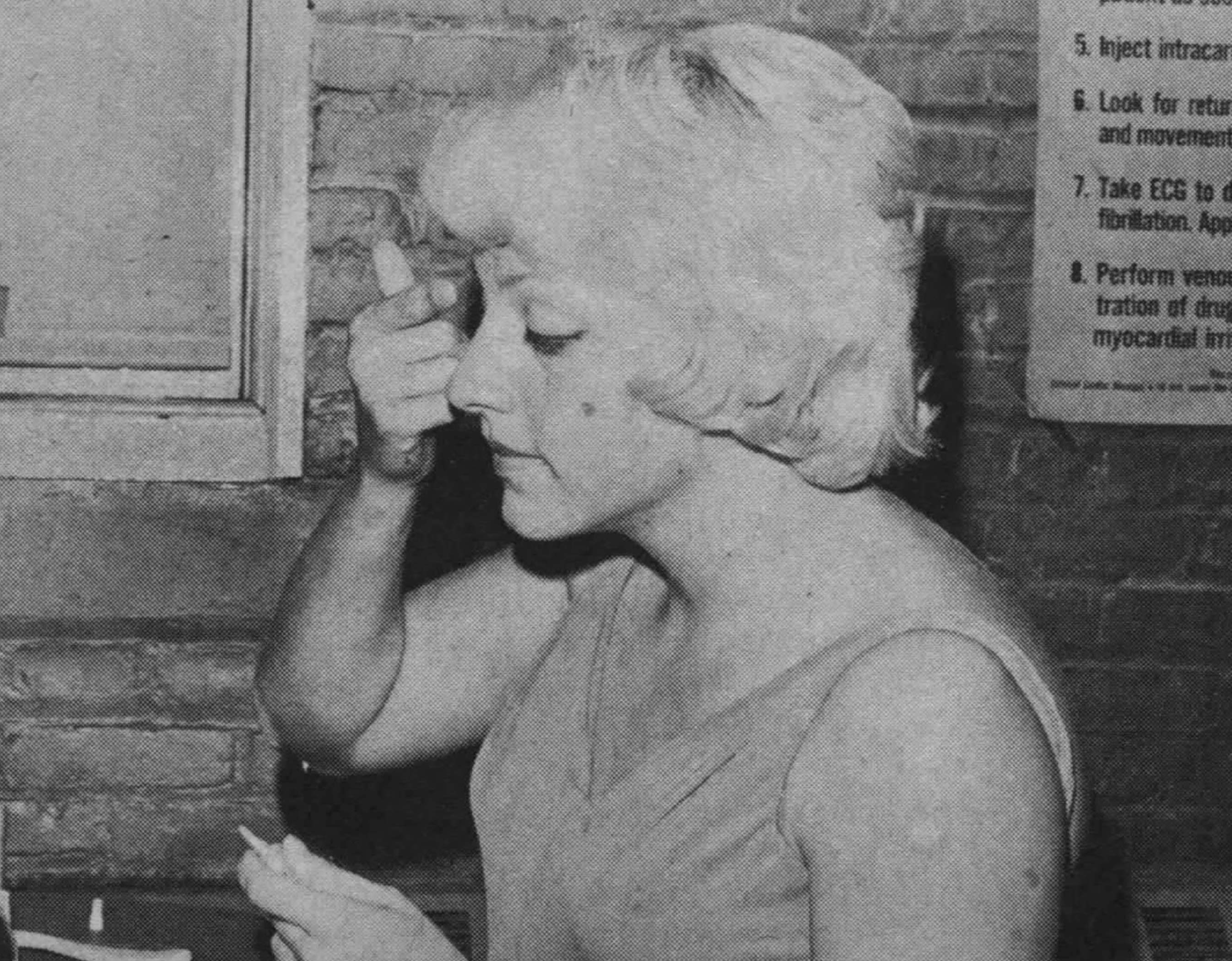
- Williams, circa 1973

Personal information
- Born: April 21, 1956 (age 70) Savannah, Georgia, U.S.

Professional wrestling career
- Ring name: Vicki Williams
- Billed height: 160 cm (5 ft 3 in)
- Billed weight: 63 kg (139 lb)
- Trained by: The Fabulous Moolah
- Debut: 1970
- Retired: 1980

Vicki Williams (born April 21, 1956) is a retired female professional wrestler. She held the NWA Women's World Tag Team Championship three times with Joyce Grable.

== Professional wrestling career ==
During a match in June 1971, midget wrestler Darlin Dagmar teamed with Williams to defeat midget wrestler Diamond Lil and Ann Casey. The following year, Williams was a contender to The Fabulous Moolah's NWA World Women's Championship, facing her for the title in Baltimore in May 1972. In August, Moolah once again defeated Williams—with the title on the line—at the first Superbowl of Wrestling event.

The team of Williams and Joyce Grable won the NWA Women's World Tag Team Championship from Donna Christanello and Toni Rose on October 15, 1973 in New York City. It was not until October 1975 that Rose and Christanello regained the title from Grable and Williams.

As a part of a Jim Crockett Promotions' card, Williams once again faced The Fabulous Moolah for the World Women's Championship, losing to Moolah on July 30, 1976 at the Richmond Coliseum before an audience of 11,000 people. That same year, she was the third runner-up for Pro Wrestling Illustrated's Girl Wrestler of the Year award, losing to Sue Green. In August 1979, the team of Grable and Williams defeated The Glamour Girls (Leilani Kai and Judy Martin) to begin their second reign as NWA Women's Tag Champions.

Williams also competed in Mexico's Universal Wrestling Association, where she was the inaugural UWA World Women's Champion. She defeated Irma González on December 6, 1979 to win the title for the first time, but she lost it two weeks later to Estela Melina. She held the title two more times in 1980, losing it for the final time to Chabela Romero.

== Championships and accomplishments ==
- National Wrestling Alliance
  - NWA Texas Women's Championship (1 time)
  - NWA World Women's Tag Team Championship (3 times) – with Joyce Grable
- Universal Wrestling Association
  - UWA World Women's Championship (3 times)
