= Irma Aguilar =

Mexican professional wrestler

Personal information
- Born: Irma Eugenia Aguilar Morales; July 13, 1957 (age 69) Mexico City, Mexico
- Spouse: Hari Kiri (ex-husband)
- Parent: Irma González (mother)
- Relative: Reyna González (aunt)

Professional wrestling career
- Billed height: 1.67 m (5 ft 6 in)
- Billed weight: 76 kg (168 lb)
- Trained by: Pedro Nieves
- Debut: May 15, 1975
- Retired: June 21, 2025

Irma Eugenia Aguilar Morales (born July 13, 1957) is a Mexican former professional wrestler, most commonly known under the ring name Irma Aguilar. She is the daughter of Irma González, a pioneer of women's professional wrestling in Mexico. Her career start in 1975, with her last known match taking place in 1997.

Aguilar was the first holder of the Mexican National Women's Tag Team Championship alongside her mother, as well as the first Distrito Federal Women's Champion, and held the UWA World Women's Championship. She has also won several high-profile Lucha de Apuestas, or hair vs. hair matches, leaving Rossy Moreno, Martha Villalobos, and Lola González, among others, bald as a result of their matches.

== Championships and accomplishments ==
- Empresa Mexicana de Lucha Libre

- Distrito Federal Women's Championship (1 time)
- Mexican National Women's Tag Team Championship (1 time, first) – with Irma González)

- Universal Wrestling Association

- UWA World Women's Championship (1 time)

== Luchas de Apuestas record ==
Winner (wager)	Loser (wager)	Location	Event	Date	Notes
Irma Aguilar (hair)	Rossy Moreno (hair)	Tijuana, Baja California	show	November 4, 1983	
Irma Aguilar (hair)	Rossy Moreno (hair)	Mexico City	EMLL show	December 4, 1987	
Irma Aguilar (hair)	Katty Mendoza (hair)	Mexico City	EMLL show	February 17, 1989	
Irma Aguilar (hair)	Martha Villalobos (hair)	Mexico City	EMLL show	August 18, 1989	
Irma Aguilar (hair)	Lola González (hair)	Mexico City	EMLL show	August 18, 1989	
Irma Aguilar (hair)	La Indomable (mask)	Xochimilco, Mexico City	show	December 25, 1997	
