= NWA World Women's Tag Team Championship =

Women's professional wrestling tag team championship

Details
- Promotion: National Wrestling Alliance
- Date established: September 11, 1952
- Current champions: Liviyah and Mackenzie Morgan
- Date won: August 22, 2026 (aired October 31, 2026)

Other names
- NWA Women's Tag Team Championship (1952–1983); NWA World Women's Tag Team Championship (2021–present)
Statistics
- First champions: Ella Waldek and Mae Young
- Most reigns: Teams (3 reigns): Joyce Grable and Vicki Williams; Joyce Grable and Wendi Richter; Individually: June Byers (7 times)

The NWA World Women's Tag Team Championship is a women's professional wrestling tag team championship defended in member promotions of the National Wrestling Alliance (NWA). Ella Waldek and Mae Young are the inaugural champions. The current champions are Liviyah and Mackenzie Morgan, who are in their first reign as a team and individually. They won the titles by defeating previous champions Pretty Empowered (Kenzie Paige and Kylie Paige) in a two out of three falls match on August 22, 2026 at the NWA Powerrr tapings (aired October 31, 2026) in Tampa, Florida.

== History ==
In the 1950s Ella Waldek and Mae Young became the inaugural champions. From the early 1950s through 1983, it was the first women's world tag team championship in professional wrestling and was initially referred to simply as the Women's World Tag Team Championship, before briefly adopting the NWA prefix. The championship was later acquired by the World Wrestling Federation (WWF, now WWE) in 1983 when the WWF, once a member of the NWA, bought the rights to the championship from The Fabulous Moolah and continued to use the belts. This ended the lineage of the NWA title and began a new one for the WWF Women's Tag Team Championship.

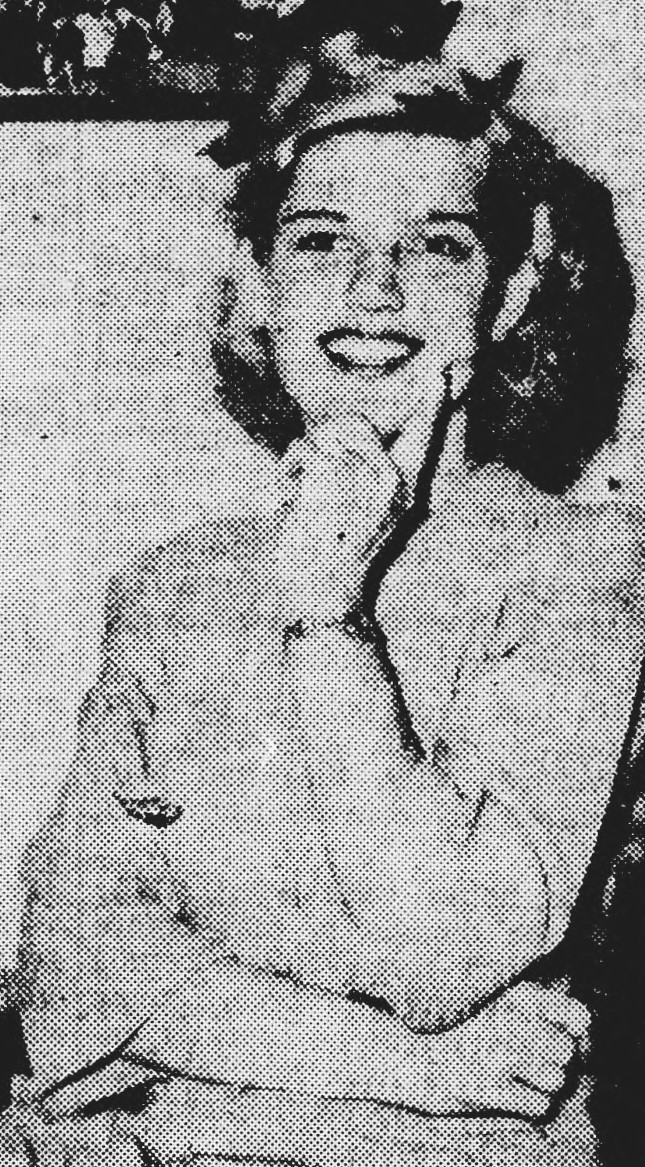
One-half of the inaugural champions Mae Young in 1943.

On July 16, 2021, Mickie James, the producer of NWA EmPowerrr, announced the revival of the championship by the NWA, where the winners would be crowned at the EmPowerrr pay-per-view on August 28. At the event, The Hex (Allysin Kay and Marti Belle) won the revived titles after defeating the team of Red Velvet and KiLynn King in the tournament final.

== Reigns ==
As of November 7, 2026, there have been 51 reigns, between 56 wrestlers, 37 teams and one vacancy. Ella Waldek and Mae Young are the inaugural champions. June Byers holds the record for most recognized reigns at 7. Joyce Grable has the most combined days as champion at a record-setting 2,095 days.

The current champions are Liviyah and Mackenzie Morgan, who are in their first reign as a team and individually. They won the titles by defeating previous champions Pretty Empowered (Kenzie Paige and Kylie Paige) in a two out of three falls match on August 22, 2026 at the NWA Powerrr tapings (aired October 31, 2026) in Tampa, Florida.
