= Women's professional wrestling =

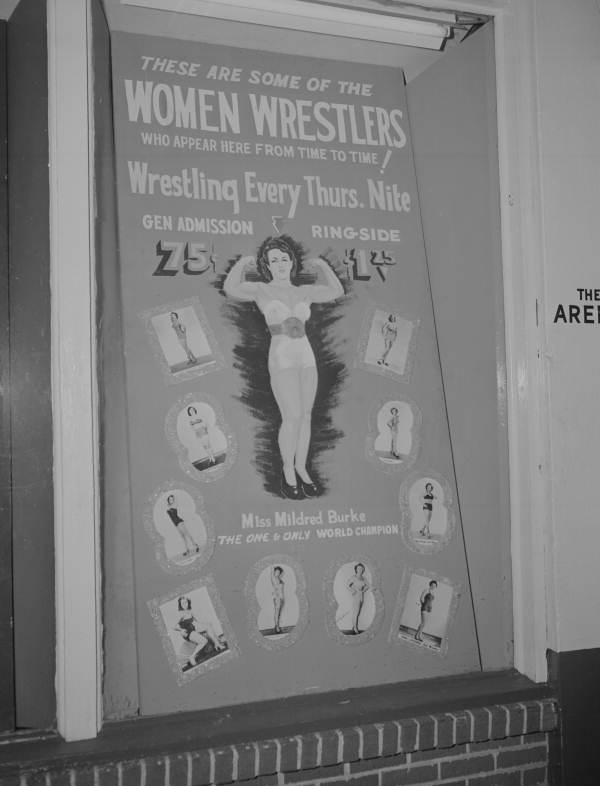
A mid-twentieth century poster advertises women wrestlers, primarily Mildred Burke.

Professional wrestling is a dramatic enactment of wrestling as a spectator sport. As is the norm for this sport, women's professional wrestling is organized by wrestling federations called promotions. Some promotions are exclusively for women, while others have separate divisions for women. Among the nations that have women's professional wrestling are Australia, Bolivia, Canada, Japan, Mexico, the United Kingdom, and the United States.

== United States ==
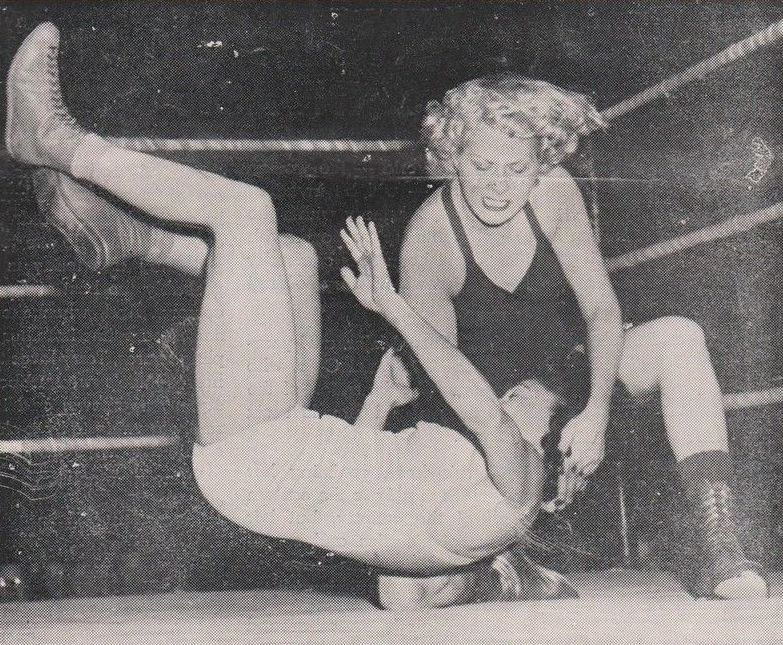
Two women wrestlers in the 1950s

In the United States, there are currently four major professional wrestling promotions that have a unified division with a title: WWE, Total Nonstop Action Wrestling (TNA), Ring of Honor (ROH), and All Elite Wrestling (AEW), in addition to a number of independent promotions with women's wrestling divisions and championships. TNA's female wrestlers are branded as the Knockouts, while ROH's female talent were formally known as the Women of Honor, and WWE's female talent were known as the Divas until 2016.

Shimmer Women Athletes, which operated from 2005 to 2021, is recognized as the earliest and most prominent promotion to take women's wrestling more seriously.

Two notable women-only promotions are the World Wrestling Network's Shine Wrestling brand (est. 2012) in Florida, which began as a sister to Shimmer; and Women of Wrestling (WOW) (est. 2000, 2012) in Los Angeles. In addition to Shine, Rise Wrestling is another promotion that was established as one of Shimmer's sister promotions and was originally a developmental program for the latter company. In 2018, they began a partnership with Impact Wrestling, which saw Impact talent compete at Rise events.

=== Championships ===
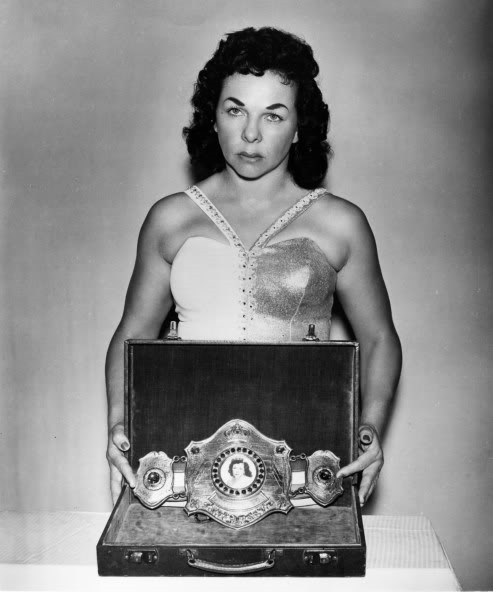
The Fabulous Moolah is recognized as having held the WWF Women's Championship for 28 years.

Women's wrestling has maintained a recognized world champion since 1937, when Mildred Burke won the original World Women's title. She then formed the World Women's Wrestling Association in the early 1950s and recognized herself as the first champion, although the championship would be vacated upon her retirement in 1956. The National Wrestling Alliance however, ceased to acknowledge Burke as their Women's World champion in 1954, and instead acknowledged June Byers as champion after a controversial finish to a high-profile match between Burke and Byers that year. Upon Byers' retirement in 1964, The Fabulous Moolah, who won a junior heavyweight version of the NWA World Women's Championship (the predecessor to the original WWE Women's Championship) in a tournament back in 1958, was recognized by most NWA promoters as champion by default.

In WWE, female professional wrestlers are members of one of the promotion's four women's divisions who compete in both singles competition and tag teams. WWE has five active women's championships: the WWE Raw Women's Championship (which is the successor to the WWE Divas Championship, which in turn succeeded the original WWE Women's Championship created in 1956) for the Raw brand, the WWE SmackDown Women's Championship for the SmackDown brand, the WWE Women's Tag Team Championship, the NXT Women's Championship and NXT Women's Tag Team Championship for the NXT brand. The Fabulous Moolah is recognized as WWE's first Women's Champion, with her reign beginning in 1956. In 2002, WWE began what was called the WWE brand extension, where wrestlers and championships became exclusive to one of WWE's brands. At first, the Women's Championship could be defended on any brand, but later that year, it became exclusive to the Raw brand. In 2008, WWE created the WWE Divas Championship as a counterpart title for the SmackDown brand. The two titles were eventually unified in September 2010. The Women's Championship was then retired in favor of keeping the Divas Championship, which became briefly known as the Unified WWE Divas Championship. The brand extension ended in 2011.

In April 2016 at WrestleMania 32, the Divas Championship was retired and subsequently replaced with a new WWE Women's Championship, which has a separate title history from the original. WWE then reintroduced the brand extension in July 2016 and the Women's Championship (now Raw Women's Championship) became exclusive to Raw. In August 2016, SmackDown created the SmackDown Women's Championship as a counterpart title. In WWE's NXT brand, women compete for the NXT Women's Championship, which was established in 2013. The NXT UK brand would create its counterpart title, the NXT UK Women's Championship, in 2018. The WWE Women's Tag Team Championship was announced on the 24 December 2018 edition of Monday Night Raw. The inaugural champions were The Boss 'n' Hug Connection (Sasha Banks & Bayley) who defeated The IIconics (Peyton Royce & Billie Kay), The Riot Squad (Liv Morgan & Sarah Logan), Nia Jax & Tamina, Mandy Rose & Sonya Deville and Naomi & Carmella at the 2019 Elimination Chamber pay-per-view.

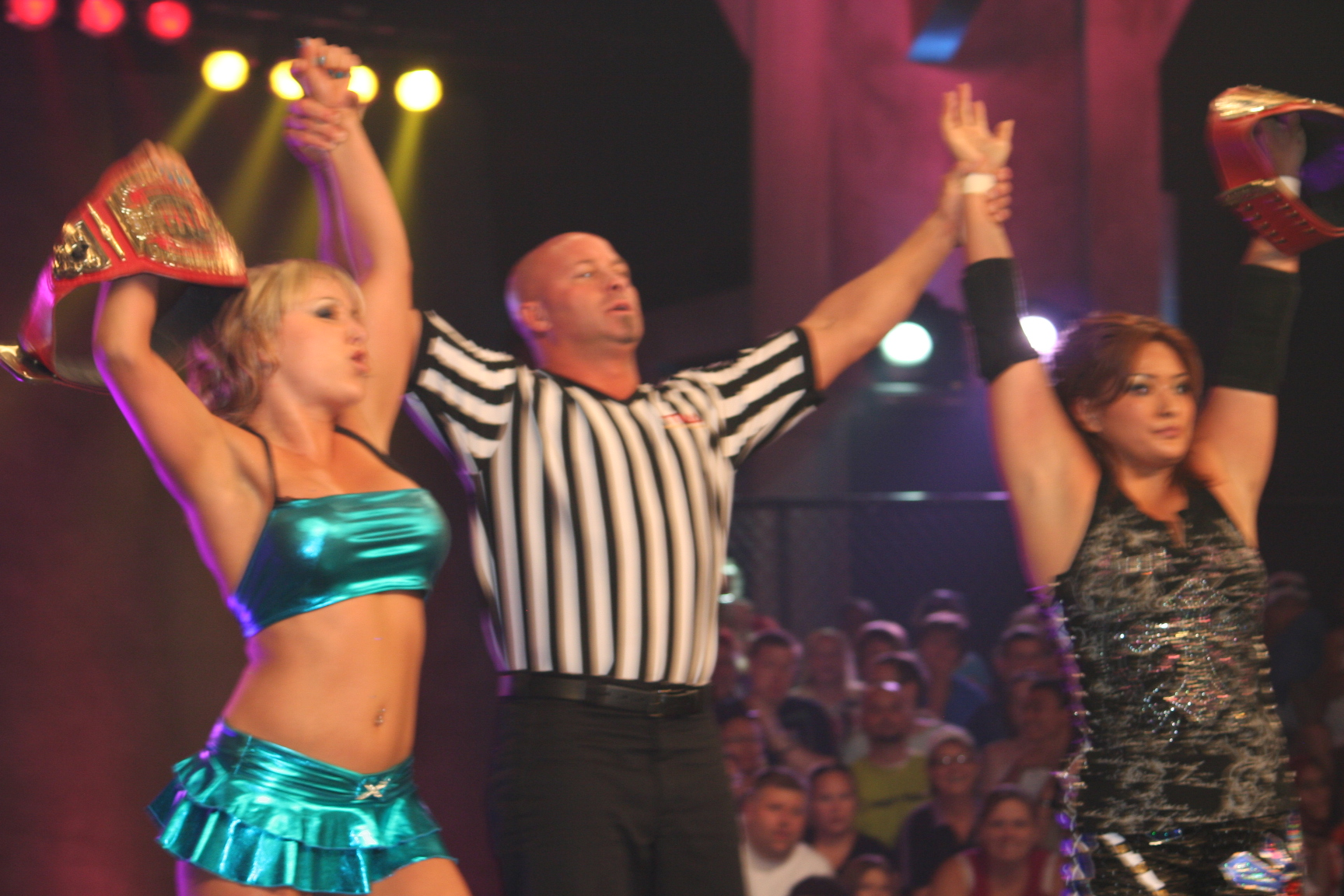
Taylor Wilde (left) and Ayako Hamada (right) with the TNA Knockouts Tag Team Championship belts in July 2010

Impact's women's championship is the Knockouts World Championship, which debuted on 14 October 2007. Its inaugural champion was Gail Kim, who won the title at Bound for Glory 2007. The promotion's tag team championship is known as the Knockouts World Tag Team Championship. The title was introduced at No Surrender 2009 and its inaugural champions were the team of Sarita and Taylor Wilde. The titles were initially deactivated on the 20 June 2013 episode of Impact!, but their return was announced at Bound for Glory 2020. At Hard To Kill, Fire N Flava (Kiera Hogan and Tasha Steelz) won a tournament to become the tag team champions.

ROH's has sporadically featured women's wrestling matches at its shows, dating back to a former working relationship with Shimmer. By 2017, ROH had been regularly featuring women's wrestling under the Women of Honor banner, culminating in the creation of the Women of Honor World Championship in December 2017 and the announcement at Final Battle 2017 of a tournament to crown the first champion. Stars from Japan's World Wonder Ring Stardom also participated in the tournament. Sumie Sakai became the inaugural Women of Honor Champion when she won the title at Supercard of Honor XII in 2018.

=== WWE Women's Revolution ===
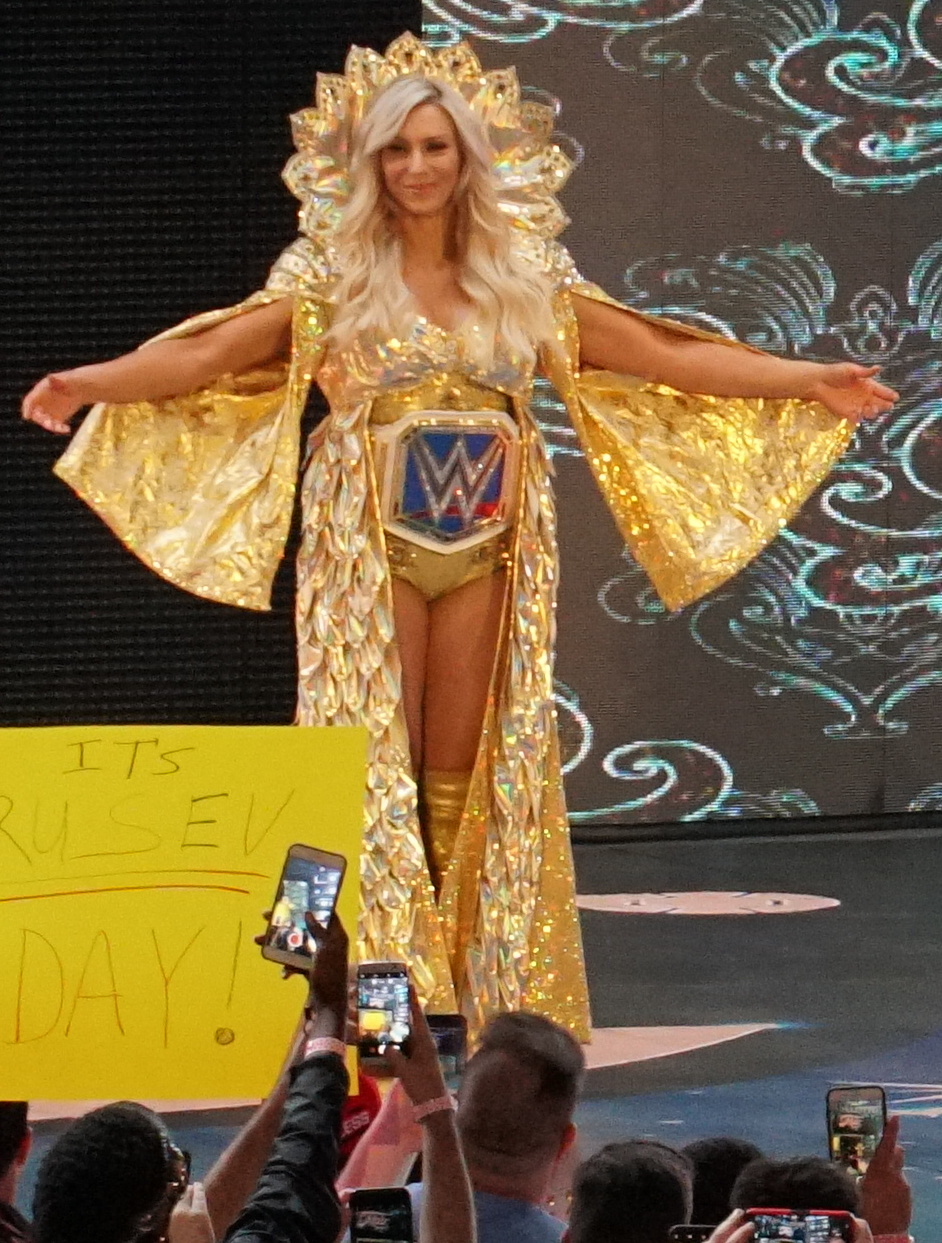
Charlotte Flair, the only woman to have held WWE's SmackDown (pictured in 2018), Raw, Divas and NXT Women's Championships

In 2015, WWE revamped its women's divisions by hiring mainly independent wrestlers as opposed to models, initially known as the "Diva's Revolution" and later known as the "Women's Revolution". NXT TakeOver: Respect, held on 7 October 2015, saw then-NXT Women's Champion Bayley defend her title against Sasha Banks in a 30–minute Iron Man match in the main event. This was the first women's match to headline a major WWE event, and the first time in WWE history that a women's match had this stipulation. A new WWE Women's Championship was unveiled and contested at WrestleMania 32 on 3 April 2016, between then-Divas Champion Charlotte Flair, Becky Lynch and Sasha Banks in a triple threat match. After Wrestlemania, the Diva's Championship and the "Diva's" branding would be retired.

Following the 2016 WWE Brand Extension, the new Women's Championship would become exclusive to the Raw brand, resulting in the creation of the SmackDown Women's Championship. Becky Lynch would become the inaugural champion at Backlash after winning a Six-pack elimination challenge. The following month, at Hell in a Cell, Charlotte would face Sasha Banks in a match for the Raw Women's Championship in what would be the first time a women's match was the main event of a WWE pay-per-view, as well as the first-ever women's Hell in a Cell match. At the 2017 Money in the Bank pay-per-view, the first-ever Women's Money in the Bank ladder match was held with the winner receiving a contract for a SmackDown Women's Championship match. The following month, WWE would hold a women's wrestling tournament called the Mae Young Classic, named after the late Mae Young.

In 2018, the January Royal Rumble pay-per-view would feature the first-ever women's Royal Rumble match in the main event, which would be the longest women's match in WWE history at the time. The following month, at the 2018 Elimination Chamber pay-per-view, the first-ever women's Elimination Chamber match took place. Later that year, WWE would present its first all-women's pay-per-view event: WWE Evolution. The Women's Evolution would culminate at WrestleMania 35 in 2019, where Charlotte Flair, Becky Lynch, and Ronda Rousey would compete in a Winner Takes All triple threat match for the Raw and SmackDown Women's championships in what would be the first time that female superstars would main event WWE's flagship event.

Nikki and Brie Bella, twin sisters who were inducted into WWEs Hall of Fame is 2021, came out of retirement for 2022 Women's Royal Rumble. Brie was the first to win a WWE Championship, but Nikki held the championship twice and held that reign longer than Brie.

=== Erotic ===
Promotions such as the Naked Women's Wrestling League showcased nude females "battling" in the ring for titillation. The NWWL broadcast shows around the world, and its wrestlers were featured in magazines such as Penthouse, Playboy, and Maxim.

== Japan ==
In Japan, women's professional wrestling is called joshi puroresu (女子プロレス), or joshi puro for short. Japanese women's wrestling is usually handled by promotions that specialize in joshi puroresu, rather than by divisions of otherwise male-dominated promotions. Frontier Martial-Arts Wrestling, a men's promotion, had a small women's division that competed with women wrestlers from other promotions.

=== 1960s–1970s ===
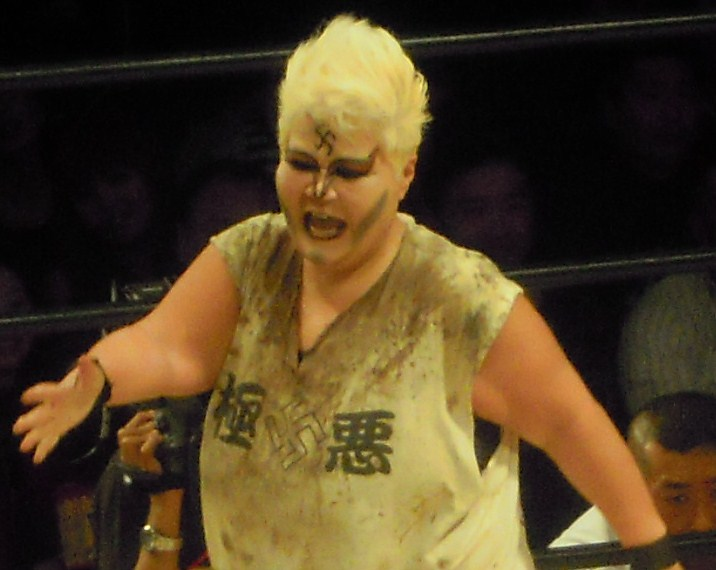
Kaoru "Dump" Matsumoto, one of Japan's leading pro wrestlers in the 1980s

All Japan Women's Pro-Wrestling (est. 1968) was the dominant joshi puro organization from the 1970s to the 1990s. AJW's first major star was Mach Fumiake in 1974, followed in 1975 by Jackie Sato and Maki Ueda (the "Beauty Pair").

=== 1980s ===
In the early 1980s, Jaguar Yokota and Devil Masami became the stars of a second wave of women wrestlers who succeeded the glamor-oriented generation defined by the Beauty Pair. That decade later saw the rise of the "Crush Gals" Chigusa Nagayo and Lioness Asuka, a tag team who achieved a level of mainstream success as women wrestlers that not only was unprecedented in Japan, but unheard of in the history of women's professional wrestling. The Crush Gals' long-running feud with Kaoru "Dump" Matsumoto and her Gokuaku Domei ("Atrocious Alliance") stable was extremely popular in Japan; their televised matches were some of the highest-rated broadcasts in the history of Japanese television, and the promotion regularly filled arenas to capacity.

=== 1990s ===
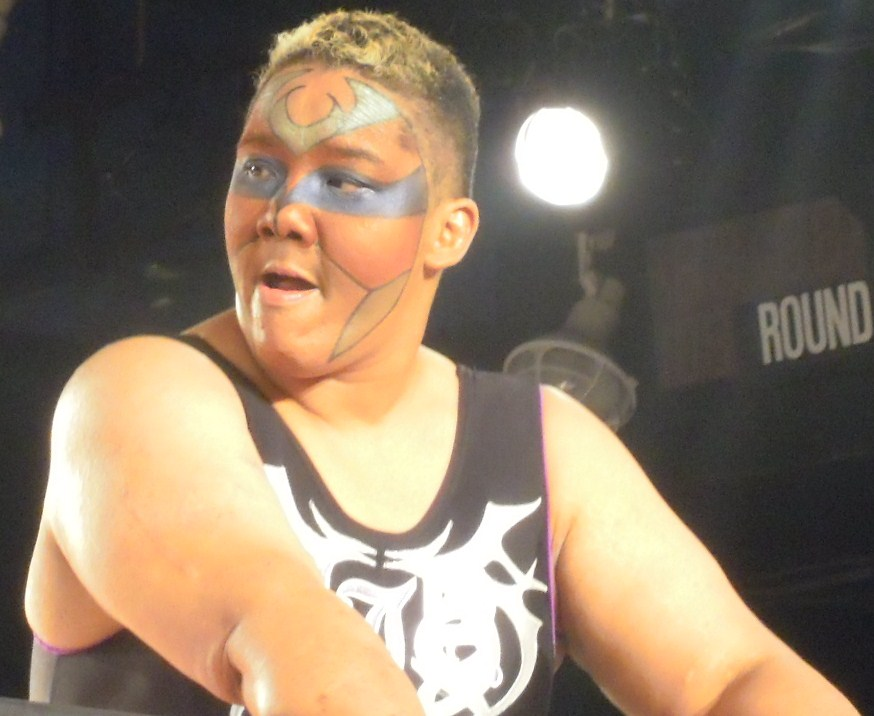
Champion wrestler Aja Kong founded the all-woman promotion Arsion in 1997.

In the 1990s, American wrestling journalist Dave Meltzer rated several joshi puroresu matches five stars—a rarely-awarded perfect score on the Cornette scale—in his periodical the Wrestling Observer Newsletter.

Prominent joshi wrestlers of the 1990s include Manami Toyota, Bull Nakano, Akira Hokuto, Cutie Suzuki, Aja Kong, Megumi Kudo, Shinobu Kandori, Kyoko Inoue, Takako Inoue (who is unrelated to Kyoko), Dynamite Kansai, and Mayumi Ozaki.

=== Late 1990s to present ===
Some joshi have a high-flying style that precedes the X Division of men's wrestling in North America. Since, for cultural reasons, women wrestlers are not divided into weight classes, these wrestlers compete for special titles comparable to the "junior heavyweight" class in men's wrestling. Arsion's Sky High of Arsion Championship (est. 1999) and NEO Japan's High Speed Championship (est. 2009) are two such titles. Recently, Marigold's Marigold Super Fly Championship (est. 2024) has arisen.

In 2010, former Arsion and JDStar promoter Rossy Ogawa, retired wrestler Fuka Kakimoto, and veteran wrestler Nanae Takahashi started a new joshi puro promotion, World Wonder Ring Stardom. Stardom, considered the premier joshi promotion in modern times, was purchased by New Japan Pro-Wrestling parent company Bushiroad in 2019.

In April 2024, Rossy Ogawa (formerly of AJPW and Stardom) founded a new women's promotion called Dream Star Fighting Marigold or Marigold.

== Mexico ==
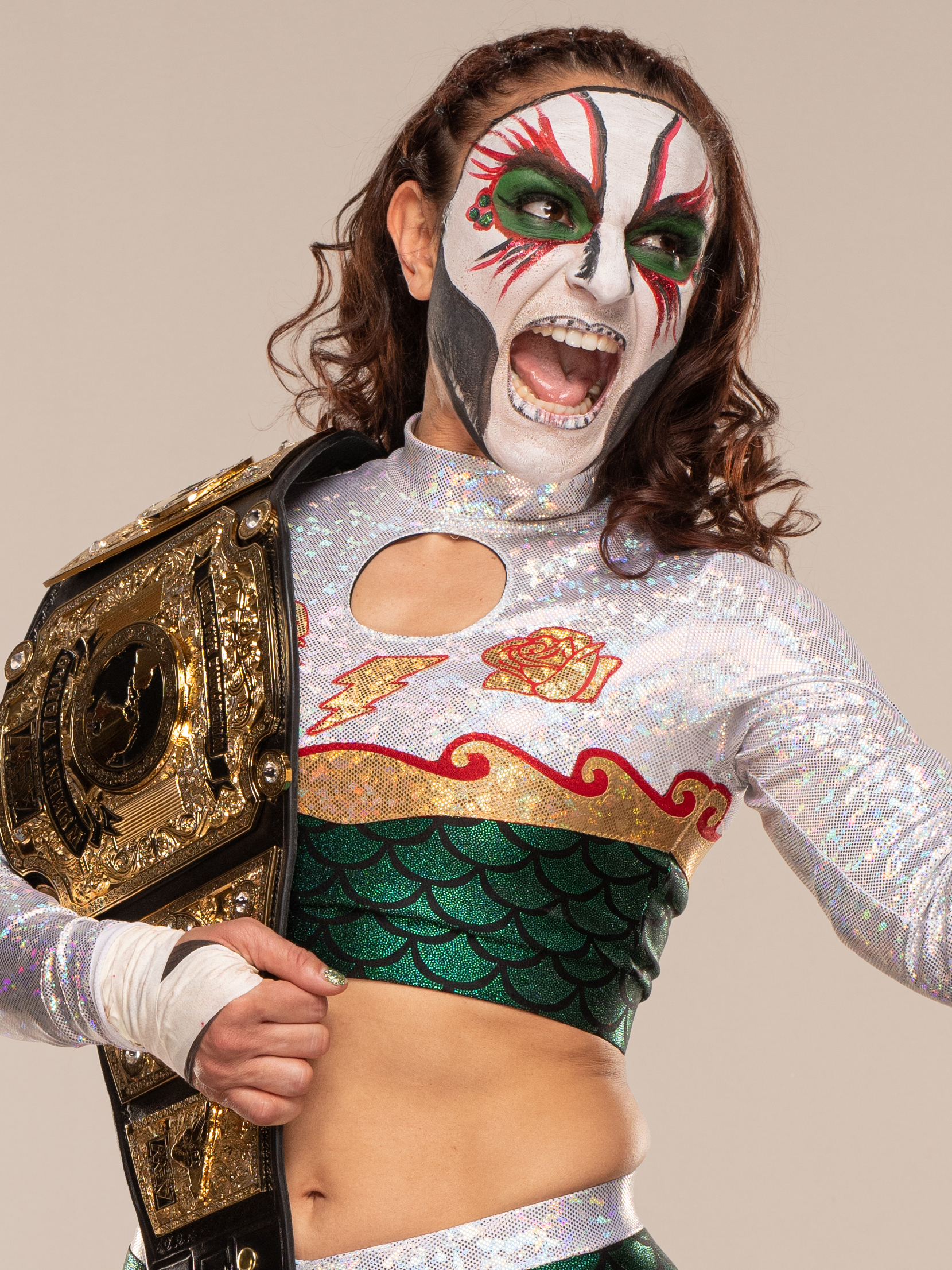
Thunder Rosa, along with the AEW Women's World Championship. She is the first wrestler from her country to win world titles abroad, as she was also an NWA World Womem's Champion.

Although women's wrestling in Mexico lagged behind its male counterpart, it was taken more seriously compared to other countries. Female wrestlers are called luchadoras.

The Consejo Mundial de Lucha Libre (CMLL) has a women's division. The top of the division is the CMLL World Women's Championship. Keiko "Bull" Nakano won the first CMLL championship in 1992. Lola González was the first local (i.e., Mexican) champion to win a CMLL title, defeating Nakano.

That same year, wrestling promoter Antonio Peña left the CMLL to form a new promotion called the Asistencia Asesoría y Administración (AAA). On February 19, 1999, Xóchitl Hamada became the inaugural Reina de Reinas Championship after defeating Esther Moreno, Miss Janeth and Rossy Moreno in a four-way match.

In 2000, businessman Luciano Alberto Garcia de Luna started an all-woman promotion company called Lucha Libre Femenil (LLF) in Monterrey.

On January 24, 2020, Thunder Rosa defeated Allysin Kay to capture the NWA World Womem's Champion and also becoming the first Mexican female wrestler to win the championship. On March 16 special edition episode of AEW Dynamite being St. Patrick's Day Slam, Rosa made history again after winning the AEW Women's World Championship after defeating Britt Baker in a Steel Cage match, becoming the first Mexican woman to win a world title outside of her country.

In February 2021, Jennifer Cantú Iglesias made history as the first Mexican woman to sign with WWE, under the ring name Yulisa León, although she was only there for two years.

== United Kingdom ==
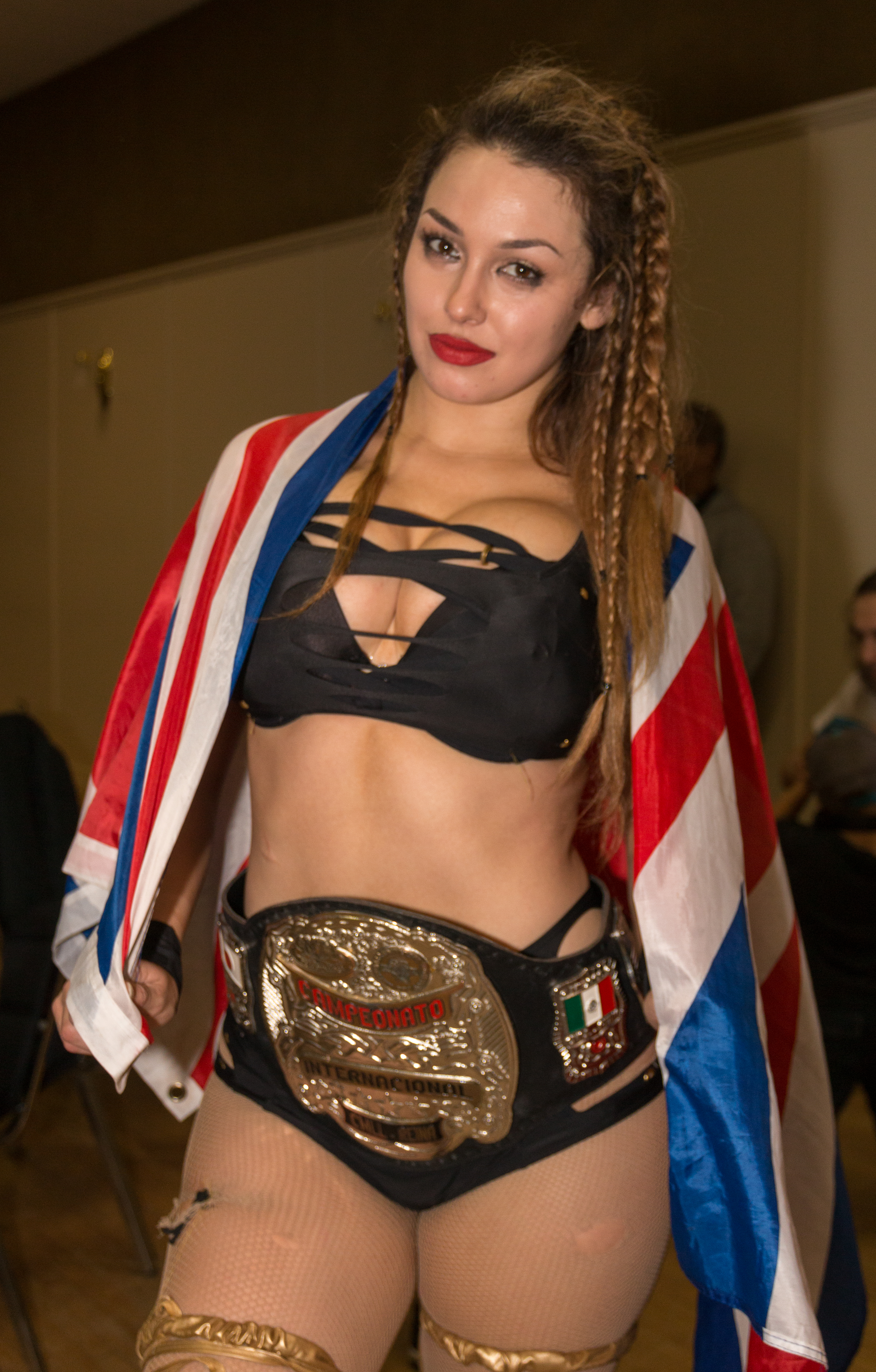
British professional wrestler, Heidi Katrina, in November 2016

Current notable independent promotions include Pro-Wrestling: EVE, Bellatrix Female Warriors, The British Bombshells, and Fierce Females.

Notable British women wrestlers include: Lady Blossom, Xia Brookside, Nikki Cross, Blair Davenport, Sadie Gibbs, Jamie Hayter, Laura James, Jetta, Klondyke Kate, Katie Lea, Dani Luna, Millie McKenzie, Tegan Nox, Paige, Jemma Palmer, Kay Lee Ray, etc.

== Other countries ==
=== Australia ===
Pro wrestler Madison Eagles and her husband Ryan co-founded the Pro Wrestling Women's Alliance (PWWA) in 2007. This independent promotion is affiliated with Pro Wrestling Alliance Australia, as well as formerly with Shimmer Women Athletes. They also had affiliations with Global Force Wrestling of the United States while the latter was active. It is the only all-female wrestling promotion in Australia.

In April 2015, WWE signed both Billie Kay and Peyton Royce to NXT. The pair later formed the team The IIconics under their original name of The Iconic Duo. They were elevated to the main roster on the SmackDown brand just after WrestleMania 34 After appearances at WWE Evolution, the 2019 Royal Rumble and Elimination Chamber, the IIconics won the WWE Women's Tag Team Championship at WrestleMania 35.

In 2017, Rhea Ripley joined WWE and participated in the Mae Young Classic. The Adelaide-based wrestler known locally as Demi Bennett would go on to participate in the second Mae Young Classic in 2018, but at TV tapings in Birmingham, England, Ripley became the first Australian woman to win a WWE controlled title when she defeated fellow Australian Toni Storm in a tournament final to be the inaugural winner of the NXT UK Women's Championship. Ripley consequently made her first pay per view appearance at the 2019 Royal Rumble as a participant of the Women's Royal Rumble match. At Wrestlemania 37 Rhea defeated Asuka to win the Raw Women's Championship

=== Bolivia ===
In Bolivia, female wrestlers called Fighting Cholitas dress in the traditional clothing of the Aymara people. They were the inspiration for the comic book Super Cholita, which premiered in 2007.

=== Canada ===
NCW Femmes Fatales is an independent promotion founded in 2009; its headquarters are in Montreal.

== Study ==
In 2023, wrestler Nikki Cross completed her master's degree in history; her dissertation was on the subject of women's wrestling.
