= Lola González =

Mexican professional wrestler

Personal information
- Born: María Dolores González; March 2, 1959 (age 67) Ciudad Juárez, Mexico
- Spouse: Fishman (ex-husband)

Professional wrestling career
- Ring name: Lola González
- Billed height: 1.63 m (5 ft 4 in)
- Billed weight: 67 kg (148 lb)
- Trained by: Gory Guerrero; Dorado Hernández
- Debut: July 17, 1975

María Dolores González (born March 2, 1959) is a Mexican professional wrestler, known by her ringname Lola González, who has competed in the Universal Wrestling Association and the World Wrestling Association for over three decades. At one time one of the most popular female tecnicos in Mexico, she dominated the UWA World Women's Championship during the mid-to late 1980s holding the title a record four times. She is the real-life ex-wife of wrestler Fishman.

== Professional wrestling career ==
She occasionally toured the United States with the National Wrestling Alliance and, in Gene and Mike LeBell's NWA Hollywood promotion, was the last NWA California Women's Champion before the promotion closed in 1982. That same year, she had a brief stint in World Class Championship Wrestling defeating Irma Gonzales at the "Fritz Von Erich Retirement Show" at the Texas Stadium on June 4, 1982. She made two more appearances for the promotion defeating La Pantera Sureña at the August 1982 "Wrestling Star Wars" supercard and faced Vicki Carranza for the "Mexican Women's" Title at the June 1983 "Wrestling Star Wars" supercard at the Reunion Arena.

González also visited Japan appearing with the Japan Women's Pro-Wrestling during the late 1980s. In a match to decide the first JWP Pacific Coast Tag Team Champions, she and La Bruha challenged but were beaten by Miss A and Xóchitl Hamada in Tokyo on October 24, 1987. On October 22, 1988, González entered a championship tournament for the IWA World Women's title in Edmonton, but was eliminated by Rhonda Sing in the opening rounds. She later lost the WWA Women's Championship to Singh in Hungary in December 1991.

On April 30, 1993, she teamed with Vicky Caranza and La Rosa in a trios tag team match against Martha Villalobos, Pantera Sureña and Wendy at the first Triplemanía hosted at the Plaza de Toros in Mexico City, Mexico. The following year, she and Martha Villalobos teamed against La Monster (the former Rhonda Sing) and Magnificent Mimi in a best of three falls match at the AAA "Night of Champions" and was pinned by La Monster for the third fall. The event took place on August 6, 1994, at the Los Angeles Sports Arena and attended by an estimated 8,000 people.

González returned to Mexico and, on November 19, 1995, entered a championship tournament for the TWF Women's Championship. She defeated Bambi in the opening round, Chikako Shiratori in the semi-finals and Bison Kimura in the finals to win the title. She held the title for nearly a year until losing to Lioness Asuka in a best of three falls match at the CMLL 63rd Anniversary Show on September 20, 1996. At the CMLL 64th Anniversary Show the next year, González faced Asuka defeating her and La Diabólica in a tag team match with Lady Apache.

At Reina de Reinas 2001 in Veracruz, González participated in the 14-women tournament but was eliminated prior to the finals. She similarly failed to reach the finals at Reina de Reinas 2006 and 2007.

On March 10, 2006, she teamed with Cinthia Moreno, Martha Villalobos and Miss Janeth in an 8-woman match at Rey de Reyes (2006) against Chikayo Nagashima, La Diabolica, Tiffany and Carlos Amano and lost the match via disqualification. Later that year, she won the EWWC Women's Championship and defended the title at El Hijo del Santo's Todo x el Todo supercard in Naucalpan against Xochitl Hamada winning via disqualification.

== Championships and accomplishments ==
- Comisión de Box y Lucha Libre Mexico D.F.

- Mexican National Women's Championship (2 times)

- JDStar

- TWF World Women's Championship (1 time)

- NWA Hollywood

- NWA California Women's Championship (1 time, last)

- Universal Wrestling Association

- UWA World Women's Championship (4 times)

- World Wrestling Association

- WWA World Women's Championship (1 time)

- Other championships

- Occidente Women's Championship (1 time)
- EWWL Women's Championship (1 time)

== Luchas de Apuestas record ==
Winner (wager)	Loser (wager)	Location	Event	Date	Notes
Lola González (hair)	La Monster (hair)	N/A	Live event	N/A	
Lola González (hair)	Zuleyma (hair)	N/A	Live event	N/A	
Lola González (hair)	Vicky Carranza (hair)	N/A	Live event	N/A	
Lola González (hair)	La Gata (mask)	Panama	Live event	N/A	
Rocío Urbina (hair)	Lola González (hair)	Pachuca, Hidalgo	Live event	1975	
Lola González (hair)	La Pantera Sureña (mask)	Pachuca, Hidalgo	Live event	1977	
Lola González (hair)	Vicki Williams (hair)	N/A	Live event	1981	
Lola González (hair)	La Pantera Sureña (hair)	Mexico City	Juicio Final	December 9, 1988	
Lola González (hair)	Estela Molina (hair)	Mexico City	EMLL show		
Lola González (hair)	Karla Ivonne (hair)	Mexico City	Domingos De Coliseo	September 1, 1991	
Lola González (hair)	La Sirenita (hair)	Unknown	Live event	1995	
Lola González (hair)	Galáctico (hair)	Ciudad Juárez, Chihuahua	Live event	September 26, 2004	
