= CMLL Torneo Nacional de Parejas Increíbles (2012) =

2012 Mexican professional wrestling tournament

CMLL Torneo Nacional De Parejas Increíbles (2012)
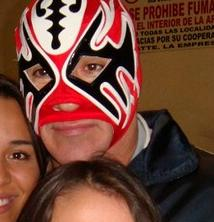
- Atlantis one half of the tournament winners for the third year in a row.
- Promotion: Consejo Mundial de Lucha Libre (CMLL)
- Date: February 17, 2012; February 24, 2012; March 2, 2012
- City: Mexico City, Mexico
- Venue: Arena México

Event chronology
| ← Previous; Reyes del Aire | Next → Homenaje a Dos Leyendas |

CMLL Torneo Nacional de Parejas Increíbles tournaments chronology
| ← Previous; 2011 | Next → 2013 |

The CMLL Torneo Nacional de Parejas Increíbles 2012 or "National Incredible Pairs Tournament 2012" was the first of a series of Lucha Libre (professional wrestling) tournaments for Tag Teams traditionally held early in the year. The tournament was based on the Lucha Libre Parejas Increíbles match type where two wrestlers of opposite allegiance, portraying either villains, referred to as "Rudos" in Lucha Libre wrestling terminology or fan favorites, or "Técnicos". At times some of the team members were part of a pre-existing scripted feuds or storylines with each other.

== Tournament ==
Consejo Mundial de Lucha Libre (CMLL) held their third annual Torneo Nacional De Parejas Increíbles tournament in February and March 2012. The tournament featured teams of wrestlers who do not usually team up, in fact most of the teams are on opposite sides of the Tecnico/Rudo (Fan favorite/villain) divide and were oftentimes direct rivals. Unlike previous tournaments the participating teams would not represent the region where they were raised or where they learned to wrestle, in fact the "National" aspect of the tournament was partially abandoned as a Non-Mexican wrestler participated for the first time. The tournament was a standard single-elimination Tag Team, split into two brackets of eight teams, the two matches for the two brackets took place on the February 17, 2012 Super Viernes and the February 24, 2014 Super Viernes and the final match was held on CMLL's annual Homenaje a Dos Leyendas as the semi-main event of the show.

=== Tournament Participants ===
One of the teams in the 2012 tournament was not actually Increíbles as Rudos El Felino and Rey Bucanero teamed up, although there was some tension between the two as Bucanero had left Felino's group La Peste Negra to form La Fuerza TRT in 2011. The following teams were part of the 2012 Torneo Nacional De Parejas Increíbles:

Key

| Symbol | Meaning |
|---|---|
| (T) | This wrestler is a Tecnico |
| (R) | This wrestler is a Rudo |

- Ángel de Oro (T) and Psicosis (R)
- Atlantis (T) and Mr. Niebla (R)
- Black Warrior (T) and Rey Escorpión (R)
- Brazo de Plata (T) and Kraneo (R)
- Marco Corleone (T) and Último Guerrero (R)
- Delta (T) and Ephesto (R)
- El Felino (R) and Rey Bucanero (R)
- Guerrero Maya Jr. (T) and Euforia (R)
- El Hijo del Fantasma (T) and Misterioso Jr. (R)
- La Mascara (T) and Averno (R)
- Máscara Dorada (T) and Volador Jr. (R)
- Máximo (T) and Mephisto (R)
- Rush (T) and El Terrible (R)
- La Sombra (T) and Mr. Águila (R)
- Stuka Jr. (T) and Pólvora (R)
- Valiente (T) and Olímpico (R)

=== Block A ===
To determine the team match-ups in the tournament a representative of each team entered a Battle royal where the order of elimination determined when the team would wrestle in the first round – the first two wrestlers eliminated would face off, then the next two and the next two, with the final two men in the ring facing off in the last of the opening round matches. The first Battle Royal, on February 17, included Euforia, Kraneo, La Mascara, Mascara Dorada, Maximo, Mr. Aguila, Mr. Niebla and Valiente. The match ended with La Mascara and Valiente as the last two wrestlers in the ring, which meant their teams would meet in the final first-round match that evening. In the first round 2010 and 2011 winner Máscara Dorada formed a very well functioning, high flying team with Volador Jr. to defeat the team of Guerrero Maya Jr. and Euforia. The Parejas Increíbles concept was really highlighted in the second tournament match as Maximo, who plays an Exótico character, a character who displays openly homosexual tendencies. During the match, Maximo tried to kiss his opponents to distract them, but when denied he kissed his partner Mephisto instead. This enraged Mephisto who attacked his own partner and knocked him out, leaving him easy prey for La Sombra and Mr. Águila to move on to the next round. The other half of the 2010 and 2011 tournament winner set aside his differences with Mr. Niebla to allow the team to defeat Brazo de Plata and Kraneo, putting them in the second round. The final first-round match saw Averno team up with the man that had forced him to unmask in 2011 at CMLL's Juicio Final ("Final Justice") show. The two got along just long enough to defeat Valiente and Olímpico. During the first of two second-round matches Volador Jr. landed wrong during a leaping move and had to actually be taken from the arena on a stretcher while the match was still going on. It is unclear if Volador Jr.'s injury forced a change to the original plans or if La Sombra and Mr. Águila had been booked to win the match from the beginning. CMLL may have wanted the 2010 and 2011 winners to face off in the semifinal but due to Volador Jr.'s injury, that matchup never happened. In the other first-round match. The final second-round match saw Atlantis continue his Parejas Increíbles tournament success as Atlantis and Mr. Niebla defeated Averno and La Mascara. The third round saw more success for Atlantis and Mr. Niebla as they earned a spot in the finals when they disposed of La Sombra and Mr. Águila in their one fall match.

=== Block B ===
In the week leading up to Block B competing, Rush stated that he was willing to set aside his differences with El Terrible as he wanted to win the Parejas Increíbles tournament, despite the two having developed a heated rivalry over the last number of months. The second block matches took place on February 24 and again started with a battle royal to determine the order of matches. The match included Ángel de Oro, Marco Corleone, Delta, Felino, El Hijo del Fantasma, Polvora, Rey Escorpion and Rush with Felino and Ángel de Oro being the last two men in the ring. In the first round Black Warrior and Rey Escorpión defeated Stuka Jr. and Pólvora in short order, followed by Marco Corleone and Último Guerrero defeating El Hijo del Fantasma and Misterioso Jr. Rush and El Terrible proved that they could indeed set aside their differences for at least one night as they worked well together to defeat Delta and Ephesto. While the final first-round match featured the only all-rudo team in the tournament it did not mean that El Felino and Rey Bucanero got along at all, during the match Rey Bucanero left his former La Peste Negra partner alone in the ring as he walked out of the arena. The odds were too hard to overcome for Felino and he fell to Ángel de Oro and Psicosis. The first match in the second round saw two members of Los Guerreros del Infierno on opposite sides as Guerreros leader Último Guerrero teamed up with Marco Corleone and Guerrero team member Rey Escorpión teamed with Black Warrior. Initially, the two Guerreros members avoided each other, but when they were finally in the ring with each other the fought like they had no allegiance with each other. In the end, Corleone and Último Guerrero took the victory and moved on to the semifinal match later that night. If the first second-round match saw allegiances set aside for the tournament, the second match saw rivalry set aside for the tournament as Rush and El Terrible once again worked better together than expected as they defeated Ángel de Oro and Psicosis to become the second team in the semifinal match. In the third and final round of the evening Rush's promise to set aside differences and win the tournament turned out to be true as the two defeated Marco Corleone and Último Guerrero to earn the second spot in the tournament finals.

=== Finals ===
The finals of the 2012 Torneo Nacional de Parejas Increíbles was the only best two out of three falls tag team match of the tournament and was the semi-main event of the 2012 Homenaje a Dos Leyendas. After getting along for all the Block B qualifying matches Rush and El Terrible miscommunication and dissension between the two allowed Atlantis to become a three time tournament winner as he and Mr. Niebla won falls two and three. Following the match Rush took a microphone and berated both El Terrible and the fans for their actions that night and then followed it up by challenging El Terrible to a Luchas de Apuestas, hair vs. hair match at a later date. El Terrible did not accept the challenge at that point in time.

=== Tournament Brackets ===
First round
Máscara Dorada and Volador Jr. | W
Guerrero Maya Jr. and Euforia
Máximo and Mephisto
La Sombra and Mr. Águila | W
Brazo de Plata and Kraneo
Atlantis and Mr. Niebla | W
La Mascara and Averno | W
Valiente and Olímpico
Stuka Jr. and Pólvora
Black Warrior and Rey Escorpión | W
Marco Corleone and Último Guerrero | W
El Hijo del Fantasma and Misterioso Jr.
Delta and Ephesto
Rush and El Terrible | W
El Felino and Rey Bucanero
Ángel de Oro and Psicosis | W

Second round
Máscara Dorada and Volador Jr.
La Sombra and Mr. Águila | W
Atlantis and Mr. Niebla | W
La Mascara and Averno
Black Warrior and Rey Escorpión
Marco Corleone and Último Guerrero | W
Rush and El Terrible | W
Ángel de Oro and Psicosis

Semifinals
La Sombra and Mr. Águila
Atlantis and Mr. Niebla | W
Marco Corleone and Último Guerrero
Rush and El Terrible | W

Finals
Atlantis and Mr. Niebla | W
Rush and El Terrible

=== Aftermath ===
While tournament winners Mr. Niebla and Atlantis had been in the middle of a storyline rivalry before the match, the tension between the two never built into anything beyond one singles match between the two. Of all the teams only the storyline between finalists Rush and El Terrible developed into a major storyline. The two faced off on several occasion through most of 2012 until the two met in the main event of the CMLL 79th Anniversary Show where Rush defeated El Terrible, forcing El Terrible to be shaved bald due to the Luchas de Apuestas stipulation.
