= Juicio Final (2005) =

Mexican professional wrestling supercard show

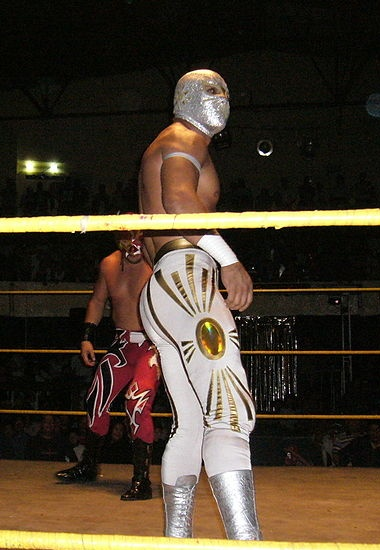
- Místico, participant in the fifth match of the night.
- Promotion: Consejo Mundial de Lucha Libre
- Date: December 2, 2005
- City: Mexico City, Mexico
- Venue: Arena México
- Attendance: 17,000

Pay-per-view chronology
← Previous; Leyenda de Plata	Next → Homenaje a Dos Leyendas

Juicio Final chronology
← Previous; 2001	Next → 2011

Juicio Final (2005) (Spanish for "Final Judgement") was a professional wrestling major show event produced by Consejo Mundial de Lucha Libre (CMLL) that took place on December 2, 2005 in Arena México, Mexico City, Mexico. This was the twelfth time that CMLL used the name "Jucio Final" for one of their major shows.

The main event of the show was a Lucha de Apuesta, hair vs. hair match between Universo 2000 and Halloween that saw Halloween lose and have all his hair shaved off after the match. The show also featured four traditional six-man "Lucha Libre rules" tag team matches, one featuring the Women's division and three regular male trios matches.

== Production ==
=== Background ===
For decades Arena México, the main venue of the Mexican professional wrestling promotion Consejo Mundial de Lucha Libre (CMLL), would close down in early December and remain closed into either January or February to allow for renovations as well as letting Circo Atayde occupy the space over the holidays. As a result, CMLL usually held a "end of the year" supercard show on the first or second Friday of December in lieu of their normal Super Viernes show. 1955 was the first year where CMLL used the name "El Juicio Final" ("The Final Judgement") for their year-end supershow. Until 2000 the Jucio Final name was always used for the year end show, but since 2000 has at times been used for shows outside of December. It is no longer an annually recurring show, but instead held intermittently sometimes several years apart and not always in the same month of the year either. All Juicio Final shows have been held in Arena México in Mexico City, Mexico which is CMLL's main venue, its "home".

=== Storylines ===
The event featured five professional wrestling matches with different wrestlers involved in pre-existing scripted feuds, plots and storylines. Wrestlers were portrayed as either heels (referred to as rudos in Mexico, those that portray the "bad guys") or faces (técnicos in Mexico, the "good guy" characters) as they followed a series of tension-building events, which culminated in a wrestling match or series of matches.

== Results ==
No.	Results	Stipulations
1	El Texano Jr., Stuka Jr. and Virus defeated Pandilla Guerrera (Arkangel de la Muerte, Hooligan and Loco Max)	Best two-out-of-three falls six-man "Lucha Libre rules" tag team match
2	Dark Angel, Diana La Cazadora and Marcela defeated La Amapola, La Medusa and Princesa Sujei	Best two-out-of-three falls six-woman "Lucha Libre rules" tag team match
3	Los Guerreros de la Atlantida (Atlantis, Olímpico and Rey Bucanero) defeated Blue Panther, Heavy Metal and Negro Casas	Best two-out-of-three falls six-man "Lucha Libre rules" tag team match
4	Dos Caras Jr., Dr. Wagner Jr. and Místico defeated La Furia del Norte (Héctor Garza, Perro Aguayo Jr. and Tarzan Boy)	Best two-out-of-three falls six-man "Lucha Libre rules" tag team match
5	Universo 2000 defeated Halloween	Best two-out-of-three falls Lucha de Apuestas, hair vs. hair match.
