= Leyenda de Plata (2005) =

Mexican professional wrestling tournament

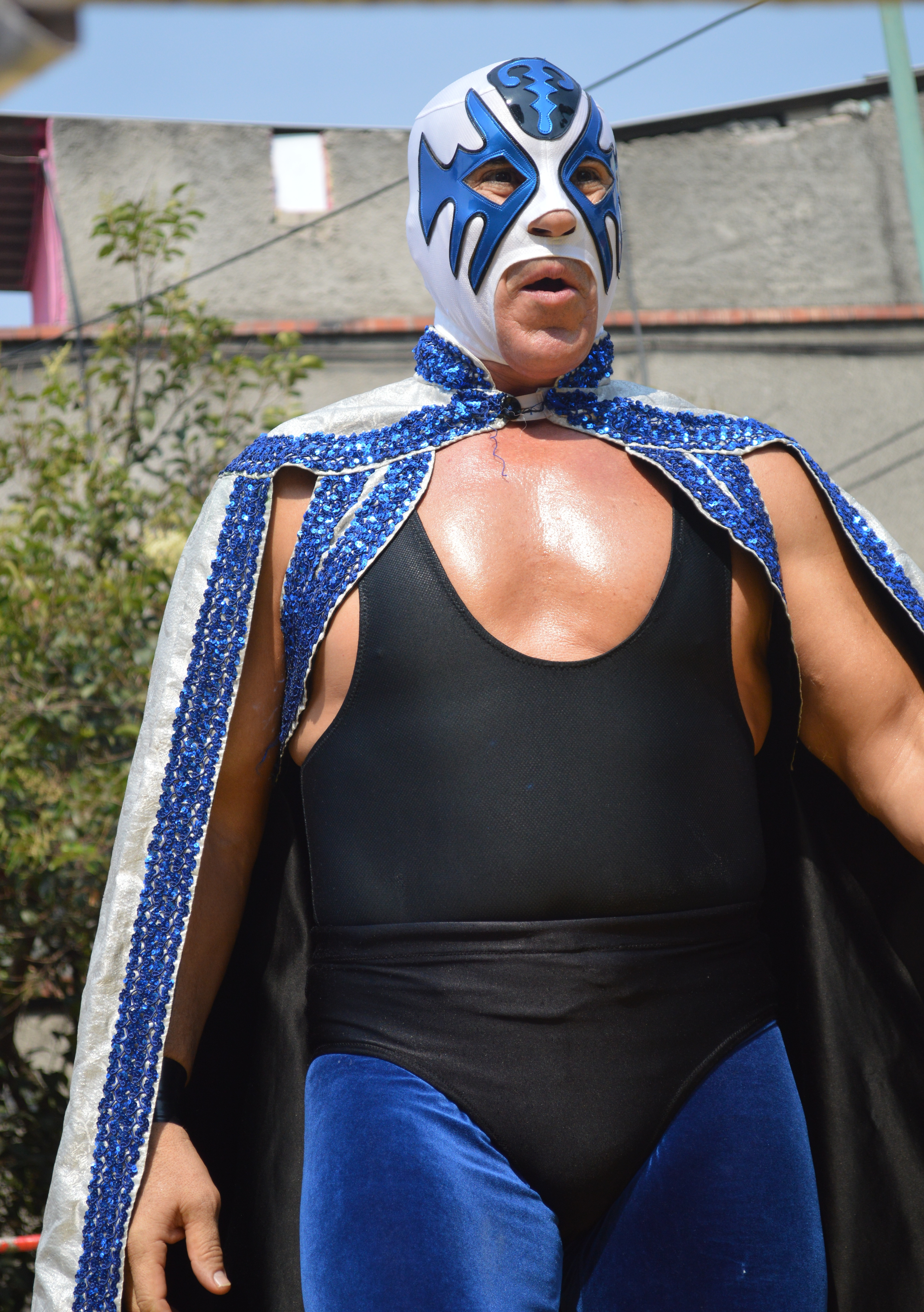
- Tournament winner Atlantis
- Promotion: Consejo Mundial de Lucha Libre
- Date: October 28, 2005; November 4, 2005; November 11, 2005
- City: Mexico City, Mexico
- Venue: Arena México

Event chronology
← Previous; International Gran Prix	Next → Juicio Final

Leyenda de Plata chronology
← Previous; 2004	Next → 2006

The Leyenda de Plata (2005) was professional wrestling tournament produced by the Mexican wrestling promotion Consejo Mundial de Lucha Libre (CMLLl; Spanish "World Wrestling Council") that ran from October 28, 2005, over the course of three of CMLL's Friday night shows in Arena México with the finals on November 11, 2005. The annual Leyenda de Plata tournament is held in honor of lucha libre legend El Santo and is one of CMLL's most important annual tournaments.

The 2005 Leyenda de Plata is the only tournament to not feature the previous year's champion defending the trophy intentionally, playing off Aguayo's breaking of the trophy the previous year. The lack of defending champion forced CMLL to change the format of the Leyenda de Plata as they held two eight-man torneo cibernetico elimination matches instead of one 16-man, with the winner of each cibernetico facing each other the following week. The two cibernetico format has been the standard tournament format for the Leyenda de Plata ever since 2005. The first cibernetico took place on October 28, 2005, and featured El Hijo del Santo, Hombre Sin Nombre, La Máscara, Volador Jr., Misterioso Jr., Jado, Averno and Negro Casas. The match came down to Hijo del Santo and Casas and initially ended in a double pin. After the match was restarted El Hijo del Santo won by submission. The second cibernetico took place on November 4 and saw Atlantis outlast a field that also included Místico, Último Dragón, Máxmio, El Sagrado, Mephisto, Hijo de Pierroth and Gedo. On November 11, 2005, Atlantis defeated El Hijo del Santo with help from his corner-man Último Guerrero to win the seventh Leyenda de Plata.

== Production ==
=== Background ===
The Leyenda de Plata (Spanish for "the Silver Legend") is an annual lucha libre tournament scripted and promoted by the Mexican professional wrestling promotion Consejo Mundial de Lucha Libre (CMLL). The first Leyenda de Plata was held in 1998 and was in honor of El Santo, nicknamed Enmáscarado de Plata (the Silver mask) from which the tournament got its name. The trophy given to the winner is a plaque with a metal replica of the mask that El Santo wore in both wrestling and lucha films.

The Leyenda de Plata was held annually until 2003, at which point El Santo's son, El Hijo del Santo left CMLL on bad terms. The tournament returned in 2004 and has been held on an almost annual basis since then. The original format of the tournament was the Torneo cibernetico elimination match to qualify for a semi-final. The winner of the semi-final would face the winner of the previous year's tournament in the final. Since 2005 CMLL has held two cibernetico matches and the winner of each then meet in the semi-final. In 2011, the tournament was modified to eliminate the final stage as the previous winner, Místico, did not work for CMLL at that point in time The 2005 edition of La Leyenda de Plata was the seventh overall tournament held by CMLL.

=== Storylines ===
The events featured a total of number of professional wrestling matches with different wrestlers involved in pre-existing scripted feuds, plots and storylines. Wrestlers were portrayed as either heels (referred to as rudos in Mexico, those that portray the "bad guys") or faces (técnicos in Mexico, the "good guy" characters) as they followed a series of tension-building events, which culminated in a wrestling match or series of matches.

== Tournament overview ==
=== Cibernetico 1 ===
#	Eliminated	Eliminated by
1	Hombre Sin Nombre	Máscara Mágica
2	Máscara Mágica	Jado
3	Volador Jr.	Averno
4	Misterioso Jr.	El Hijo del Santo
5	Jado	Negro Casas
6	Averno	El Hijo del Santo
7	Negro Casas	El Hijo del Santo
8	Winner	El Hijo del Santo

=== Cibernetico 2 ===
#	Eliminated	Eliminated by
1	El Hijo de Pierroth	Máximo
2	Gedo	Último Dragón
3	Máximo	El Sagrado
4	Último Dragón	Mephisto
5	El Sagrado	Atlantis
6	Mephisto	Místico
7	Místico	Disqualification
8	Winner	Atlantis

== Results ==
=== October 28, 2005 ===
No.	Results	Stipulations
1	Bam Bam and Último Dragóncito defeated and Pequeño Violencia and Sombrita	Best two-out-of-three falls tag team match
2	Metro, El Sagrado, and Virus defeated Dr. X, Loco Max, and Mr. México	Best two-out-of-three falls six-man tag team match
3	Gedo, Ohara, and Okumura defeated El Felino, Heavy Metal, and Máximo	Best two-out-of-three falls six-man tag team match
4	El Hijo del Santo defeated Hombre Sin Nombre, La Máscara, Volador Jr., Misterioso Jr., Jado, Averno, and Negro Casas	2005 Leyenda de Plata qualifier, 8-man torneo cibernetico elimination match
5	el Hijo del Perro Aguayo, Héctor Garza, and El Terrible defeated Rey Bucanero, Último Guerrero, and Universo 2000	Best two-out-of-three falls six-man tag team match

=== November 4, 2005 ===
No.	Results	Stipulations
1	Chamaco Valaguez Jr., Stuka Jr., and Virus defeated Apocalipsis, Arkángel de la Muerte, and Hooligan	Best two-out-of-three falls six-man tag team match
2	Blue Panther, La Máscara, and El Satánico defeated Jado, Misterioso Jr., and Mr. Águila	Best two-out-of-three falls six-man tag team match
3	Atlantis defeated Místico, Mephisto, El Sagrado, Último Dragón, Máximo, Gedo, and El Hijo del Pierroth	2005 Leyenda de Plata qualifier, 8-man torneo cibernetico elimination match
4	Pierroth Jr., Último Guerrero, and Universo 2000 defeated Damián 666, el Hijo del Perro Aguayo, and Halloween	Best two-out-of-three falls six-man tag team match
5	Dos Caras Jr., Dr. Wagner Jr., and El Hijo del Santo defeated El Canek, Rey Bucanero, and Tarzan Boy	Best two-out-of-three falls six-man tag team match

=== November 11, 2005 ===
No.	Results	Stipulations
1	Ramstein and Súper Comando defeated Leono and Starman	Best two-out-of-three falls tag team match
2	Diana La Cazadora and India Sioux defeated La Nazi and Princesa Sugehit	Best two-out-of-three falls tag team match
3	Dos Caras Jr., Mr. Niebla, and Último Dragón defeated Gedo, Kenzo Suzuki, and Tarzan Boy	Best two-out-of-three falls six-man tag team match
4	Pierroth Jr., Último Guerrero, and Universo 2000 defeated Damián 666, el Hijo del Perro Aguayo, and Halloween by disqualification	Best two-out-of-three falls six-man tag team match
5	Dr. Wagner Jr., La Máscara, and Místico defeated Averno, Mephisto, and Rey Bucanero	Best two-out-of-three falls six-man tag team match
6	Atlantis defeated El Hijo del Santo	2005 Leyenda de Plata semi-finals
