= List of CMLL World Heavyweight Champions =

Two-time former champion, Hechicero.

The CMLL World Heavyweight Championship (Campeonato Mundial Completo de CMLL in Spanish) is a singles professional wrestling championship promoted by Consejo Mundial de Lucha Libre (CMLL). The Championship has been in existence since 1991.^{[G]} Unlike other heavyweight titles such as the WWE Championship or the IWGP Heavyweight Championship, it is not the main championship in the promotion because CMLL has emphasized the lower weight levels since there are more workers in the lower levels. The title was the first to be created after Empresa Mexicana de la Lucha Libre changed its name to Consejo Mundial de Lucha Libre in the early 1990s.

As it is a professional wrestling championship, it is not won legitimately; it is instead won via a scripted ending to a match or awarded to a wrestler because of a storyline. As the championship is designated as a heavyweight title, it can only officially be competed for by wrestlers weighing at least 105 kg (231 lb). The rule is not strictly adhered to as several champions have been under the weight limit, including the 16th champion, Héctor Garza who weighed 95 kg (209 lb). All title matches take place under two-out-of-three falls rules.

The first champion was Konnan El Barbaro, who won a 16-man tournament in 1991.^{[G]} The current champion is Zack Sabre Jr., who is in his first reign. He defeated Hechicero on November 16, 2026. The championship has been vacated three times; all instances were when the champion left CMLL for another promotion. Universo 2000 holds the record for most reigns, with three.

== Title history ==
Key
No.	Overall reign number
Reign	Reign number for the specific champion
Days	Number of days held
N/A	Unknown information
+	Current reign is changing daily

No.	Champion	Championship change			Reign statistics		Notes	Ref.
No.	Champion	Date	Event	Location	Reign	Days	Notes	Ref.
Consejo Mundial de Lucha Libre (CMLL)
1	Konnan El Barbaro	June 9, 1991	EMLL Domingos Arena Mexico	Mexico City, D.F.	1	70	Defeated Cien Caras in a tournament final to become the inaugural champion.	
2	Cien Caras	August 18, 1991	Wrestling In Monterrey	Monterrey, NL	1	299		
—	Vacated	June 12, 1992	—	—	—	—	The championship was vacated when Cien Caras left CMLL to work for Asistencia Asesoría y Administración (AAA).	^{[G]}
3	Black Magic	November 20, 1992	CMLL on Televisa	Mexico City, D.F.	1	219	Black Magic Defeated Rayo de Jalisco Jr. in a tournament final to win the vacant championship.	
4	Brazo de Plata	June 27, 1993	CMLL Domingos Arena Mexico	Mexico City, D.F.	1	396		
5	Silver King	July 28, 1994	Live event	Cuernavaca, Morelos	1	330		
6	Apolo Dantés	June 23, 1995	CMLL on Televisa	Mexico City, D.F.	1	296		
7	Rayo de Jalisco Jr.	April 14, 1996	CMLL Domingos Arena Mexico	Mexico City, D.F.	1	369		
8	Steele	April 18, 1997	41. Aniversario de Arena México	Mexico City, D.F.	1	136 or 165		
—	Vacated	September 1, 1997	—	—	—	—	The championship was vacated when Steele left CMLL for the World Wrestling Federation.	^{[G]}
9	Universo 2000	October 17, 1997	CMLL Super Viernes	Mexico City, D.F.	1	331	Universo 2000 Defeated Cien Caras and Rayo de Jalisco Jr. in a three-way match to win the vacant title.	
10	Rayo de Jalisco Jr.	September 13, 1998	CMLL Guadalajara Domingos	Guadalajara, Jalisco	2	453		
11	Universo 2000	December 10, 1999	CMLL on Televisa	Mexico City, D.F.	2	1,225		
12	Mr. Niebla	April 18, 2003	CMLL on Televisa	Mexico City, D.F.	1	543		
13	Universo 2000	October 12, 2004	CMLL Martes De Coliseo	Mexico City, D.F.	3	999		
14	Dos Caras Jr.	July 8, 2007	CMLL Domingos De Coliseo	Mexico City, D.F.	1	533		
15	Último Guerrero	December 22, 2008	Live event	Mexico City, D.F.	1	963		
16	Héctor Garza	August 12, 2011	CMLL on Televisa	Mexico City, D.F.	1	128		
—	Vacated	December 18, 2011	Live event	Mexico City, D.F.	—	—	The Championship announced vacated on the December 18, 2011, edition of Domingos Arena Mexico after Héctor Garza left CMLL to join Perros del Mal Producciones on November 11, 2011.	
17	El Terrible	January 1, 2012	CMLL Guerreros del Ring	Mexico City, D.F.	1	1,125	El Terrible defeated Rush to win the vacant championship.	
18	Máximo/Máximo Sexy	January 30, 2015	CMLL on Fox Sports	Mexico City, D.F.	1	843		
—	Vacated	May 22, 2017	—	—	—	—	The Championship vacated when Máximo Sexy was fired by CMLL.	
19	Marco Corleone	June 6, 2017	CMLL Guadalajara Martes	Guadalajara, Jalisco	1	442	Corleone defeated El Terrible in the finals of a torneo cibernetico to win the vacant championship.	
—	Vacated	August 22, 2018	—	—	—	—	Championship vacated when Marco Corleone left CMLL.	
20	Último Guerrero	October 16, 2018	CMLL Martes Arena Mexico	Mexico City, D.F.	2	1,074	Guerrero defeated Diamante Azul to win the vacant title	
21	Hechicero	September 24, 2021	CMLL 88. Aniversario	Mexico City, D.F.	1	409		
22	Gran Guerrero	November 7, 2022	Lunes Clásico	Mexico City, D.F.	1	1,117		
23	Claudio Castagnoli	November 28, 2025	Leyenda Azul	Mexico City, D.F.	1	112		
24	Hechicero	March 20, 2026	Homenaje a Dos Leyendas	Mexico City, D.F.	2	241		
25	Zack Sabre Jr.	November 16, 2026	Lucha Kingdom	Mexico City, D.F.	1	5+		

== Combined reigns ==
As of November 19, 2026.

†	Indicates the current champion

Rank	Wrestler	No. of reigns	Combined days
1	Universo 2000	3	2,555
2	Último Guerrero	2	2,037
3	El Terrible	1	1,125
4	Gran Guerrero	1	1,117
5	Máximo/Máximo Sexy	1	843
6	Rayo de Jalisco, Jr.	2	822
7	Hechicero	2	560
8	Mr. Niebla	1	543
9	Dos Caras Jr.	1	533
10	Marco Corleone	1	442
11	Brazo de Plata	1	396
12	Silver King	1	330
13	Cien Caras	1	299
14	Apolo Dantés	1	296
15	Black Magic	1	219
16	Steele	1	(Note: Steel vacated the title on an unspecified day in September 1997, putting his reign between 136 and 165 days.)
17	Héctor Garza	1	128
18	Claudio Castagnoli	1	112
19	Konnan el Barbaro	1	70
20	Zack Sabre Jr. †	1	5+
