= Homenaje a Dos Leyendas (2006) =

Mexican professional wrestling supercard show

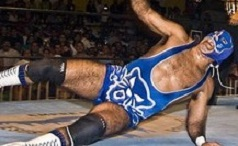
- Blue Panther, wrestled in the fourth match of the night.
- Promotion: Consejo Mundial de Lucha Libre
- Date: March 17, 2006
- City: Mexico City, Mexico
- Venue: Arena México

Event chronology
← Previous; Juicio Final	Next → La Copa Junior

Homenaje a Dos Leyendas chronology
← Previous; 2005	Next → 2007

Homenaje a Dos Leyendas (2006) (Spanish for "Homage to Two Legends") was a professional wrestling supercard show event, scripted and produced by Consejo Mundial de Lucha Libre (CMLL; "World Wrestling Council"). The Dos Leyendas show took place on March 17, 2006 in CMLL's main venue, Arena México, Mexico City, Mexico. The event was to honor and remember CMLL founder Salvador Lutteroth, who died in March 1987. Starting in 1999 CMLL honored not just their founder, but also El Santo, the most famous Mexican professional wrestler ever. This was the seventh March show held under the Homenaje a Dos Leyendas name, having previously been known as Homenaje a Salvador Lutteroth from 1996 to 1998.

The main event was a Lucha de Apuestas, hair vs. hair match between Universo 2000 and Perro Aguayo Jr. The background for this match went back beyond the previous year's Homenaje a Dos Leyendas show where Aguayo and his father Perro Aguayo defeated Universo 2000's brothers (Cien Caras and Máscara Año 2000) in an Apuesta match. For the match Aguayo, Sr. was in his son's corner while Cien Caras was Universo 2000's cornerman. Perro Aguayo Jr. won the match two falls to one, forcing Universo 2000 to be shaved completely bald after the match. The show featured five additional matches, all Six-man "Lucha Libre rules" tag team matches.

== Production ==
=== Background ===
Since 1996 the Mexican wrestling company Consejo Mundial de Lucha Libre (Spanish for "World Wrestling Council"; CMLL) has held a show in March each year to commemorate the passing of CMLL founder Salvador Lutteroth who died in March 1987. For the first three years the show paid homage to Lutteroth himself, from 1999 through 2004 the show paid homage to Lutteroth and El Santo, Mexico's most famous wrestler ever and from 2005 forward the show has paid homage to Lutteroth and a different leyenda ("Legend") each year, celebrating the career and accomplishments of past CMLL stars. Originally billed as Homenaje a Salvador Lutteroth, it has been held under the Homenaje a Dos Leyendas ("Homage to two legends") since 1999 and is the only show outside of CMLL's Anniversary shows that CMLL has presented every year since its inception. All Homenaje a Dos Leyendas shows have been held in Arena México in Mexico City, Mexico, which is CMLL's main venue, its "home". Traditionally CMLL holds their major events on Friday Nights, which means the Homenaje a Dos Leyendas shows replace their regularly scheduled Super Viernes show. The 2006 show was the 11th overall Homenaje a Dos Leyendas show.

=== Storylines ===
The Homenaje a Dos Leyendas show featured six professional wrestling matches with different wrestlers involved in pre-existing scripted feuds, plots and storylines. Wrestlers were portrayed as either heels (referred to as rudos in Mexico, those that portray the "bad guys") or faces (técnicos in Mexico, the "good guy" characters) as they followed a series of tension-building events, which culminated in a wrestling match or series of matches.

=== Homage to Salvador Lutteroth and El Santo ===
In September 1933 Salvador Lutteroth González founded Empresa Mexicana de Lucha Libre (EMLL), which would later be renamed Consejo Mundial de Lucha Libre. Over time Lutteroth would become responsible for building both Arena Coliseo in Mexico City and Arena Mexico, which became known as "The Cathedral of Lucha Libre". Over time EMLL became the oldest wrestling promotion in the world, with 2018 marking the 85th year of its existence. Lutteroth has often been credited with being the "father of Lucha Libre", introducing the concept of masked wrestlers to Mexico as well as the Luchas de Apuestas match. Lutteroth died on September 5, 1987. EMLL, late CMLL, remained under the ownership and control of the Lutteroth family as first Salvador's son Chavo Lutteroth and later his grandson Paco Alonso took over ownership of the company.

The life and achievements of Salvador Lutteroth is always honored at the annual Homenaje a Dos Leyenda' show and since 1999 CMLL has also honored a second person, a Leyenda of lucha libre, in some ways CMLL's version of their Hall of Fame. For several years the second Leyenda honored was the Mexican cultural icon El Santo whose popularity transcended both lucha libre and lucha films. El Santo, real name Rodolfo Guzmán Huerta (September 23, 1917 – February 5, 1984), was an active wrestler from 1934 until 1982, who also starred in over 50 lucha films between 1958 and 1982. Through his popularity and the roles he played in his films, El Santo became a Mexican folk hero and became a symbol of Mexican wrestling across the world. During his career, he mainly wrestled for Empresa Mundial de Lucha Libre in Mexico where he won the Mexican National Light Heavyweight Championship, Mexican National Middleweight Championship, Mexican National Tag Team Championship with Rayo de Jalisco, Mexican National Welterweight Championship, NWA World Middleweight Championship and the NWA World Welterweight Championship. He is said to have popularized professional wrestling in Mexico just as Rikidōzan did in Japan or like Hulk Hogan did in the United States. Guzmán's son followed him into wrestling as El Hijo del Santo, or the 'Son of Santo'. In 2018, WWE inducted him into their Hall of Fame in the Legacy category.

== Results ==
No.	Results	Stipulations
1	Pandilla Guerrera (Doctor X, Loco Max and Nitro) defeated Stuka Jr., Tigre Blanco and Tigre Metálico - two falls to one	Best two-out-of-three falls six-man "Lucha Libre rules" tag team match
2	Dark Angel, India Sioux and Marcela defeated Hiroka, La Amapola and Princesa Sujei - two falls to one	Best two-out-of-three falls six-man "Lucha Libre rules" tag team match
3	Dos Caras Jr., Lizmark Jr. and Último Dragón defeated Damián 666, El Terrible and Mr. Águila - two falls to one	Best two-out-of-three falls six-man "Lucha Libre rules" tag team match
4	Los Guerreros del Atlantida (Atlantis, Rey Bucanero and Último Guerrero) defeated Blue Panther, Dr. Wagner Jr. and L.A. Park - two falls to one	Best two-out-of-three falls six-man "Lucha Libre rules" tag team match
5	Místico, Heavy Metal and Negro Casas defeated Averno, Mephisto and Olímpico - two falls to one	Best two-out-of-three falls six-man "Lucha Libre rules" tag team match
6	Perro Aguayo Jr. defeated Universo 2000 - two falls to one	Best two-out-of-three falls Lucha de Apuestas, hair vs. hair match
