= Homenaje a Dos Leyendas (2007) =

Mexican professional wrestling supercard show

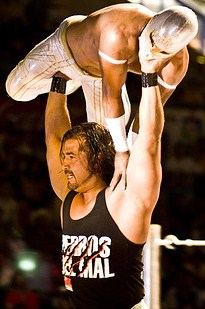
- Místico (masked) and Héctor Garza, on opposite sides in the fifth match of the show.
- Promotion: Consejo Mundial de Lucha Libre
- Date: March 30, 2007
- City: Mexico City, Mexico
- Venue: Arena México

Event chronology
← Previous; Reyes del Aire	Next →: 51. Aniversario de Arena México

Homenaje a Dos Leyendas chronology
← Previous; 2006	Next → 2008

Homenaje a Dos Leyendas (2007) (Spanish for "Homage to Two Legends") was a professional wrestling pay-per-view (PPV) show event, scripted and produced by Consejo Mundial de Lucha Libre (CMLL; "World Wrestling Council"). The Dos Leyendas show took place on March 30, 2007 in CMLL's main venue, Arena México, Mexico City, Mexico. The event was to honor and remember CMLL founder Salvador Lutteroth, who died in March 1987. Starting in 1999, CMLL honored not just their founder during the show, but also a second lucha libre legend, making it their version of a Hall of Fame event. For the 2007 show CMLL commemorated the life and career of wrestler and lucha film star Huracán Ramírez. This was the ninth March show held under the Homenaje a Dos Leyendas name, having previously been known as Homenaje a Salvador Lutteroth from 1996 to 1998.

The main event of the Dos Leyendas show was fought under Lucha de Apuestas ("bet match") rules where the loser would have his head shaved bald. The match saw Marco Corleone defeat Universo 2000. After his loss, Universo 2000 was forced to stand in the center of the ring to have all his hair cut off. The show featured five further matches, four Six-man "Lucha Libre rules" tag team match and one regular Tag team match.

== Production ==
=== Background ===
Since 1996 the Mexican wrestling company Consejo Mundial de Lucha Libre (Spanish for "World Wrestling Council"; CMLL) has held a show in March each year to commemorate the passing of CMLL founder Salvador Lutteroth who died in March 1987. For the first three years the show paid homage to Lutteroth himself, from 1999 through 2004 the show paid homage to Lutteroth and El Santo, Mexico's most famous wrestler ever and from 2005 forward the show has paid homage to Lutteroth and a different leyenda ("Legend") each year, celebrating the career and accomplishments of past CMLL stars. Originally billed as Homenaje a Salvador Lutteroth, it has been held under the Homenaje a Dos Leyendas ("Homage to two legends") since 1999 and is the only show outside of CMLL's Anniversary shows that CMLL has presented every year since its inception. All Homenaje a Dos Leyendas shows have been held in Arena México in Mexico City, Mexico, which is CMLL's main venue, its "home". Traditionally CMLL holds their major events on Friday Nights, which means the Homenaje a Dos Leyendas shows replace their regularly scheduled Super Viernes show. The 2007 show was the 12th overall Homenaje a Dos Leyendas show.

=== Storylines ===
The Homenaje a Dos Leyendas show featured six professional wrestling matches with different wrestlers involved in pre-existing scripted feuds, plots and storylines. Wrestlers were portrayed as either heels (referred to as rudos in Mexico, those that portray the "bad guys") or faces (técnicos in Mexico, the "good guy" characters) as they followed a series of tension-building events, which culminated in a wrestling match or series of matches.

=== Homage to Salvador Lutteroth and Huracán Ramírez ===
In September 1933 Salvador Lutteroth González founded Empresa Mexicana de Lucha Libre (EMLL), which would later be renamed Consejo Mundial de Lucha Libre. Over time Lutteroth would become responsible for building both Arena Coliseo in Mexico City and Arena Mexico, which became known as "The Cathedral of Lucha Libre". Over time EMLL became the oldest wrestling promotion in the world, with 2018 marking the 85th year of its existence. Lutteroth has often been credited with being the "father of Lucha Libre", introducing the concept of masked wrestlers to Mexico as well as the Luchas de Apuestas match. Lutteroth died on September 5, 1987. EMLL, late CMLL, remained under the ownership and control of the Lutteroth family as first Salvador's son Chavo Lutteroth and later his grandson Paco Alonso took over ownership of the company.

The life and achievements of Salvador Lutteroth is always honored at the annual Homenaje a Dos Leyenda' show and since 1999 CMLL has also honored a second person, a Leyenda of lucha libre, in some ways CMLL's version of their Hall of Fame. For the 2007 show CMLL commemorated the life and career of wrestler and lucha film star Daniel García Arteaga (April 9, 1926 – October 31, 2006), known under the ring name Huracán Ramírez (Spanish for "Hurricane Ramírez"). The "Huracán Ramírez" character was created for the movie Huracán Ramírez and was originally not portrayed by García. He was given the rights to also wrestle under the name in addition to performing as Ramírez in films. He was also credited as the inventor/innovator of the Huracánrana, a move now common in professional wrestling all over the world. During his 46-year-long career he won the Mexican National Welterweight Championship three times, as well as the NWA World Welterweight Championship while working in Mexico. He also worked for the Canadian-based Stampede Wrestling where he won the Stampede Wrestling International Tag Team Championship with Chet Wallick and Jim Wright, and the NWA Canadian Tag Team Championship twice, with Roberto Pico and Chet Wallick. He never lost his mask during his career.

== Results ==
No.	Results	Stipulations
1	Dark Angel, Lady Apache and Marcela defeated La Amapola, Raven Hiroka and Mima Shimoda	Best two-out-of-three falls six-man "Lucha Libre rules" tag team match
2	Black Warrior, Misterioso Jr. and Tarzan Boy defeated Leono, El Sagrado, and Volador Jr.	Best two-out-of-three falls six-man "Lucha Libre rules" tag team match
3	Los Guerreros del Infierno (Atlantis, Olímpico and Sangre Azteca defeated Los Perros del Mal (Mr. Águila, Damián 666 and Halloween)	Best two-out-of-three falls six-man "Lucha Libre rules" tag team match
4	Dos Caras Jr., Lizmark Jr. and Rey Bucanero defeated Averno, Ephesto and Mephisto	Best two-out-of-three falls six-man "Lucha Libre rules" tag team match
5	Místico and Último Guerrero defeated Perro Aguayo Jr. and Héctor Garza	Best two-out-of-three falls Tag team match
6	Marco Corleone defeated Universo 2000	Best two-out-of-three falls, Lucha de Apuestas, hair vs. hair match
