= IWRG Intercontinental Women's Championship =

Professional wrestling championship by International Wrestling Revolution Group

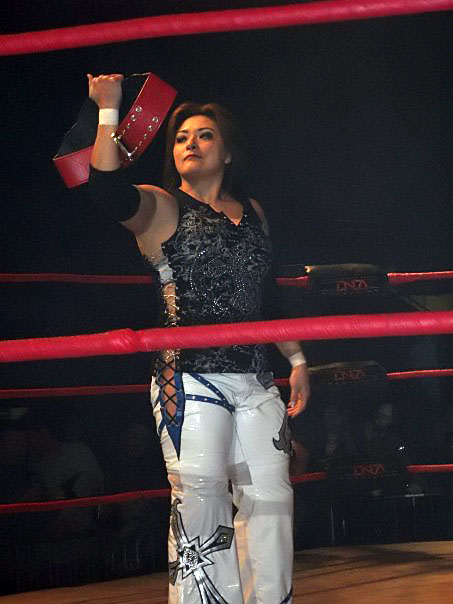
- Ayako Hamada, first ever champion

Details
- Promotion: International Wrestling Revolution Group
- Date established: September 11, 2003
Statistics
- First champion(s): Ayako Hamada
- Final champion(s): La Amapola
- Longest reign: La Amapola
- Shortest reign: Ayako Hamada

The IWRG Intercontinental Women's Championship (Campeonato Intercontinental Feminil IWRG in Spanish) is an inactive women's professional wrestling championship promoted by the Mexican wrestling promotion International Wrestling Revolution Group (IWRG). As it was a professional wrestling championship, the championship was not won not by actual competition, but by a scripted ending to a match determined by the bookers and match makers. (Note: Hornbaker (2016) p. 550: "Professional wrestling is a sport in which match finishes are predetermined. Thus, win–loss records are not indicative of a wrestler's genuine success based on their legitimate abilities – but on now much, or how little they were pushed by promoters") On occasion the promotion declares a championship vacant, which means there is no champion at that point in time. This can either be due to a storyline, (Note: Duncan & Will (2000) p. 271, Chapter: Texas: NWA American Tag Team Title [World Class, Adkisson] "Championship held up and rematch ordered because of the interference of manager Gary Hart") or real life issues such as a champion suffering an injury being unable to defend the championship, (Note: Duncan & Will (2000) p. 20, Chapter: (United States: 19th Century & widely defended titles – NWA, WWF, AWA, IW, ECW, NWA) NWA/WCW TV Title "Rhodes stripped on 85/10/19 for not defending the belt after having his leg broken by Ric Flair and Ole & Arn Anderson") or leaving the company. (Note: Duncan & Will (2000) p. 201, Chapter: (Memphis, Nashville) Memphis: USWA Tag Team Title "Vacant on 93/01/18 when Spike leaves the USWA.")

The first champion was Ayako Hamada who won it on September 11, 2003 in an elimination match against Flor Metalica, La Amapola, Lady Metal, Joseline, Marcela, Migala and La Diabólica. After the win Hamada began working in Japan more and more, thus never defending the title in Mexico. In 2005 La Amapola showed up at a wrestling event wearing the Women's title, claiming to have won it in Japan, without any sources to support the claim. The title has not been defended or promoted since 2007 where when IWRG stopped working with Consejo Mundial de Lucha Libre (CMLL), La Amapola's employee. Amapola has not officially been stripped of the title; it is inactive as the IWRG does not promote it or refer to it any more.

== Title history ==
Key
No.	Overall reign number
Reign	Reign number for the specific champion
Days	Number of days held
N/A	Unknown information
(NLT)	Championship change took place "no later than" the date listed
†	Championship change is unrecognized by the promotion

No.	Champion	Championship change			Reign statistics		Notes	Ref.
No.	Champion	Date	Event	Location	Reign	Days	Notes	Ref.
1	Ayako Hamada	September 11, 2003	IWRG show	Naucalpan, State of Mexico	1	478	Defeated Flor Metalica, La Amapola, Lady Metal, Joseline, Marcela, Migala and La Diabólica in an elimination match to become first champion.	
2	La Amapola	2005	IWRG show	Unknown	1	(Note: It is unclear when Amapola won the championship and when exactly IWRG and CMLL stopped working together making the reign length impossible to calculate.)	Record unclear on how La Amapola won the championship.	
—	Deactivated	2007	—	—	—	—	IWRG and CMLL stopped working together, IWRG did not regularly promote women's matches after this point in time. Never officially announced as abandoned, just not mentioned.	
