= CMLL World Heavyweight Championship =

Men's professional wrestling championship

- The design used for most of the CMLL World Championship belts (no weight division indicated)

Details
- Promotion: Consejo Mundial de Lucha Libre
- Date established: June 9, 1991 (Note: Duncan & Will (2000) p 395 "Konnan el Barbaro 1991/06/09 Mexico City Defeats Cien Caras in tournament final.")
- Current champion: Zack Sabre Jr.
- Date won: November 16, 2026
Statistics
- First champion: Konnan el Bárbaro
- Most reigns: Universo 2000 (3 times)
- Longest reign: Universo 2000 (1225 days)
- Shortest reign: Konnan el Bárbaro (70 days)
- Oldest champion: Último Guerrero (46 years, 229 days)
- Youngest champion: Steel (26 years, 43 days)
- Heaviest champion: Brazo de Plata (135 kg (298 lb))
- Lightest champion: Máximo Sexy (92 kg (203 lb))

The CMLL World Heavyweight Championship (Spanish: Campeonato Mundial de Peso Completo del CMLL) is a men's professional wrestling world heavyweight championship created and promoted by the Mexican (lucha libre) promotion Consejo Mundial de Lucha Libre (CMLL). It was introduced in 1991 to signal CMLL's independence from the National Wrestling Alliance (NWA), as CMLL had left the NWA in the late 1980s but had continued to promote the NWA's championships. As part of the move away from the NWA, CMLL established championships designated as "CMLL World Championships" for several weight divisions. The Heavyweight Championship was the first CMLL title to be created, and the inaugural champion was Konnan el Bárbaro, who won the title on June 9, 1991. The current champion is Zack Sabre Jr., who is in his first reign. He won the title by defeating Hechicero at Lucha Kingdom on November 16, 2026.

In most professional wrestling promotions around the world, the "world heavyweight" designation is used to indicate the highest-ranking championship instead of an actual weight division. Traditionally, however, lucha libre has used multiple weight divisions, often with the lower weight classes receiving more attention from the promoters. CMLL carries on this tradition. (Note: Hornbaker (2016) p. 550: "Professional wrestling is a sport in which match finishes are predetermined. Thus, win–loss records are not indicative of a wrestler's genuine success based on their legitimate abilities – but on now much, or how little they were pushed by promoters")

== History ==
The Mexican professional wrestling promotion Empresa Mexicana de Lucha Libre (EMLL) was founded in 1933 and initially recognized a series of "Mexican National" wrestling championships, endorsed by the Comisión de Box y Lucha Libre Mexico D.F. (Mexico City Boxing and Wrestling Commission). The Mexican National Heavyweight Championship was created in 1926, and over time, EMLL began promoting matches for that championship with the approval and oversight of the wrestling commission. (Note: Duncan & Will (2000) pp. 390–391, Chapter Mexico: National Heavyweight Title "Regulated by the Mexico City wrestling and boxing commission") In the 1950s, EMLL became a member of the National Wrestling Alliance (NWA), recognized the NWA World Heavyweight Championship as the highest ranking championship, and began promoting title matches for the NWA in Mexico on occasion.

In the late 1980s, EMLL left the NWA to avoid their politics and would later rebrand themselves as "Consejo Mundial de Lucha Libre" (CMLL). Although they had left the NWA, they were still promoting the NWA's titles. By the start of the 1990s, CMLL began to downplay the Mexican National Heavyweight Championship bouts, featuring them less frequently on CMLL shows, and eventually stopped promoting them altogether. In 1991, CMLL began creating a series of CMLL-branded world championships, the first of which was for the heavyweight division. (Note: Duncan & Will (2000) pp. 389–401 lists the CMLL World Heavyweight Title as the first created out of all the CMLL World Titles) The first CMLL World Heavyweight Champion was crowned in the finals of a 16-man tournament that saw Konnan el Bárbaro defeat Cien Caras. Konnan lost the title to Cien Caras in his first title defense on August 18, 1991, (Note: Duncan & Will (2000) p 395 "Cien Caras 1991/08/18 Monterrey) making him one of three champions without a single successful title defense. (Note: CageMatch: documents the following champions with no known successful defenses: Konnan (0), Steele (0), and Héctor Garza.)

Cien Caras left CMLL in the summer of 1992 to join former CMLL promoter Antonio Peña in Peña's newly formed Asistencia Asesoría y Administración (AAA) wrestling promotion, leaving CMLL without a heavyweight champion. (Note: Duncan & Will (2000) p 395 "Vacant on 92/06/19 after Caras jumps to AAA in 92/05.") CMLL held a 16-man single-elimination tournament from October 30, 1992, to November 20, 1992, which ended with Black Magic defeating Rayo de Jalisco Jr. to win the championship. (Note: Duncan & Will (2000) p 395 "Black Magic (Norman Smiley) 1992/11/20 Mexico City Defeats Rayo de Jalisco Jr. in tournament final.") With that victory, he became the first non-Hispanic, and so far the only British wrestler, to win the championship. On June 27, 1993, Mexican native Brazo de Plata defeated Black Magic for the title at Arena México, CMLL's main venue. (Note: Duncan & Will (2000) p 395 "Brazo de Plata 1993/06/27 Mexico City")

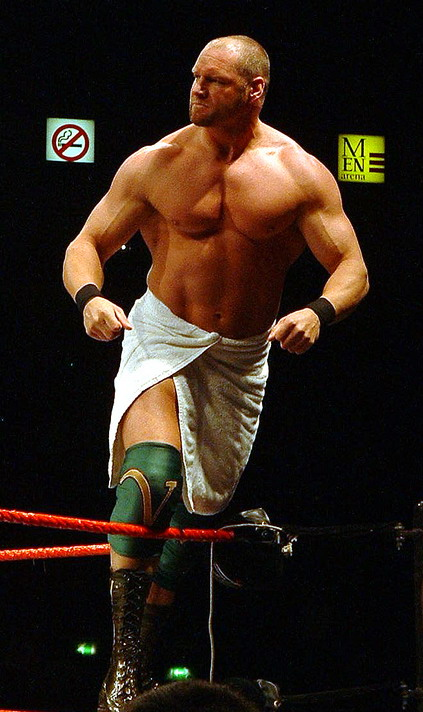
Steel (pictured in 2006 as Val Venis), the 8th CMLL World Heavyweight Champion.

On April 18, 1997, Steel became the first Canadian to win the championship by defeating then-champion Rayo de Jalisco Jr. to become the eighth overall champion. (Note: Duncan & Will (2000) p 395 "Rayo de Jalisco Jr. 1996/04/14 Mexico City / The Steele 1997/04/18 Mexico City") In September 1997, Steel signed a contract with the World Wrestling Federation (WWF, renamed WWE in 2002) forcing CMLL to vacate the championship for the second time. (Note: Duncan & Will (2000) p 395 "Vacant in 97/09 when Steele leaves for the WWF") Instead of holding a traditional tournament to crown another champion, CMLL had the new champion decided in a triple threat match between the top three heavyweight contenders, Universo 2000, Rayo de Jalisco Jr., and Cien Caras. On October 19, 1997, Universo 2000 won the title, (Note: Duncan & Will (2000) p 395 "Universo 2000 1997/10/17 Mexico City") starting the first of his three reigns, more than any other wrestler. Universo 2000 lost the title to and regained the title from Rayo de Jalisco Jr. (Note: Duncan & Will (2000) p 395 "Rayo de Jalisco Jr. [2] 1998/09/13 Guadalajara / Universo 2000 [2] 1999/12/10 Mexico City") Universo 2000's second reign as champion lasted 1,225 days, the championship's longest reign. This record-breaking run ended on April 18, 2003, when Mr. Niebla won the title. Mr. Niebla was champion for 543 days before Universo 2000 regained the championship for his record-setting third reign.

On July 8, 2007, Dos Caras Jr. became the fourteenth overall champion. His reign lasted 533 days, but only saw him defend the title a few times, defeating Lizmark Jr. and Último Guerrero. On December 22, 2008, Último Guerrero won the championship from Dos Caras Jr., who shortly afterwards left CMLL to work for WWE. (Note: Súper Luchas (December 23, 2008): "El Ultimo Guerrero se coronó ayer en la ciudad de Puebla, gracias a un foul tras la distracción del referee por parte de Rey Bucanero, con esto, los Bucanero y Guerrero tienen los dos principales títulos del CMLL (semicompleto y completo)" ("Último Guerrero was crowned yesterday in Puebla, thanks to a foul after the referee was distracted by Rey Bucanero, with this, Bucanero and Guerrero have the two main titles of the CMLL (light heavyweight and Heavyweight)")) On April 2, 2009, Último Guerrero successfully defended the title against Rey Mendoza Jr. on an independent wrestling promotion show in Gomez Palacio, marking the first time the CMLL World Heavyweight Championship was defended on a non-CMLL promoted show. (Note: El Siglo del Torreon (2009): "Último Guerrero retuvo la noche del jueves su cinturón de campeón mundial de peso completo avalado por el Consejo Mundial de Lucha Libre, luego de imponerse al Villano V (Ray Mendoza júnior)." ("Último Guerrero retained his CMLL World Heavyweight Championship on Thursday night, after defeating Villain V (Ray Mendoza Junior) .")) After a 963-day reign and 17 successful defenses, Guerrero lost the title to Héctor Garza on August 12, 2011. (Note: Súper Luchas (November 12, 2011): "El campeón mundial del CMLL ha dejado la empresa mexicana y ahora iniciará una nueva aventura con Los Perros del Mal" ("The CMLL world champion has left the Mexican company and will now start a new adventure with Los Perros del Mal")) The championship was vacated on November 11, 2011, after Garza left CMLL for Perros del Mal Producciones, a group of former CMLL wrestlers who broke away from the promotion in late 2011. On January 1, 2012, El Terrible became the new champion when he defeated CMLL World Light Heavyweight Champion Rush in a decision match. (Note: Súper Luchas (January 1, 2012) "El Terrible conquistó este primero de enero el Campeonato Mundial Completo del CMLL (título vacante ante la salida de Héctor Garza de la empresa), tras vencer a Rush" ("El Terrible won the CMLL World Championship (Championship vacated after Héctor Garza's departure from the company after defeating Rush")) The two had won a torneo cibernetico match a week earlier to earn spots in the match. (Note: Medio Tiempo (December 26, 2011): " Los dos últimos en quedar en este torneo fueron Terrible, que después de recibir con unas patadas a Marco Corleone que preparaba un ataque aéreo lo dejo desorbitado y fuera de combate, muy tranquilo en la esquina técnica aparecía Rush; quien cuido cada momento para salir bien librado de sus batallas. De esta manera ya se tienen a los prospectos para el Campeonato Mundial de Peso Completo del CMLL" ("The last two to be in this tournament were Terrible, who after receiving with kicks to Marco Corleone preparing an air raid left him exorbitant and out of combat, very quiet in the technical corner appeared Rush; Who takes care every moment to get well out of his battles. In this way we already have the prospects for the CMLL World Heavyweight Championship"))

Máximo Sexy won the championship on January 30, 2015, by defeating El Terrible. (Note: CMLL (2015) "Con el carisma y amor desbordante que define a MAXIMO "La vida en rosa" además de su buen luchar, el integrante de la dinastía Alvarado se convirtió en Campeón, luego de derrotar al Líder de los TRT, El Terrible," ("With the charisma and overflowing love that defines Maximo "The life in pink", who in addition to being a good wrestler, is a member of the Alvarado dynasty, became Champion, after defeating the leader of TRT, El Terrible,")) On May 22, 2017, then-reigning champion Máximo Sexy was fired by CMLL for his involvement in an act of vandalism and the championship was vacated. (Note: CMLL (2017): "De la misma manera se da a conocer que los luchadores Máximo, La Máscara y Bobby Villa han dejado de pertenecer a esta empresa, quedando vacantes los cinturones que los dos primeros ostentaban" ("At the same time they announced that wrestlers Máximo, La Máscara and Bobby Villa no longer work for the company, leaving the championships held by the first two vacant")) (Note: Súper Luchas (May 20, 2017): "Al otro día, La Máscara, Máximo, Psycho Clown, Brazo de Platino, Alimaña (cuñado de Brazo de Oro) y otros más, acudieron a la Arena México a destrozar el auto del Guerrero." ("The next day, La Máscara, Másximo, Psycho Clown, Brazo de Platino, Alimaña (Brazo deo Oro's brother-in-law) and others, went to Arena Mexico to destroy Guerrero's car.")) On June 6, 2017, Marco Corleone won a 10-man torneo cibernetico match to become the new CMLL World Heavyweight Champion, but he vacated the title after 442 days when he left the promotion. Último Guerrero won the title for a second time when he defeated Diamante Azul in the finals of a tournament on October 16, 2018.

Hechicero shown here with the title belt around his waist during an AEW Dynamite episode.

After 1,074 days, Hechicero defeated Último Guerrero at CMLL 88. Aniversario to win the title. Hechicero lost the title on November 7, 2022 against Gran Guerrero.

== Rules ==
The championship is designated as a heavyweight title, which means that it can only be officially competed for by wrestlers weighing 105 kg (231 lb) and above. In the 20th century, Mexican wrestling enforced the weight divisions more strictly, but in the 21st century, the rules have been occasionally ignored for the various weight divisions. The Heavyweight Championship was no exception as several champions were under the weight limit, including Héctor Garza, who was billed as weighing 95 kg (209 lb) when he won the championship and was thus considered a Junior Light Heavyweight. (Note: Comisión de Box y Lucha Libre (2001) "Completo 105 kilos sin limite" ("Heavyweight 105 kilos with no upper limit")) (Note: Pro Wrestling Illustrated (2008) p. 71 "Héctor Garza 209 lbs") While the "world heavyweight" title is traditionally considered the most prestigious weight division in most professional wrestling promotions, CMLL places more emphasis on the lower weight divisions, and the CMLL World Heavyweight title is not considered the top CMLL championship. (Note: Madigan (2007): "Traditionally the heavyweight division was not considered the biggest draw, nor the most important division in Mexico")

With a total of 12 CMLL championships being labeled as "World" titles, the promotional focus shifts over time with no single championship being promoted as the "main" one. Up until late 2021, championship matches were usually decided by two-out-of-three falls. On occasion, single-fall title matches took place, especially when promoting CMLL title matches in Japan, conforming to the traditions of the local promotion. (Note: An example of this was Bushi winning the CMLL World Welterweight Championship in a one-fall match on a New Japan Pro-Wrestling show. (Note: njpw.co.jp (2015): "一方、タイトルマッチはBUSHIがドラダに毒霧を浴びせ、エムエックスで勝利。" ("Meanwhile, BUSHI used his poisonous mist on Dorada, and won the title match with the M-X. Stole the belt in one fall. ")))

== Tournaments ==
=== 1991 ===
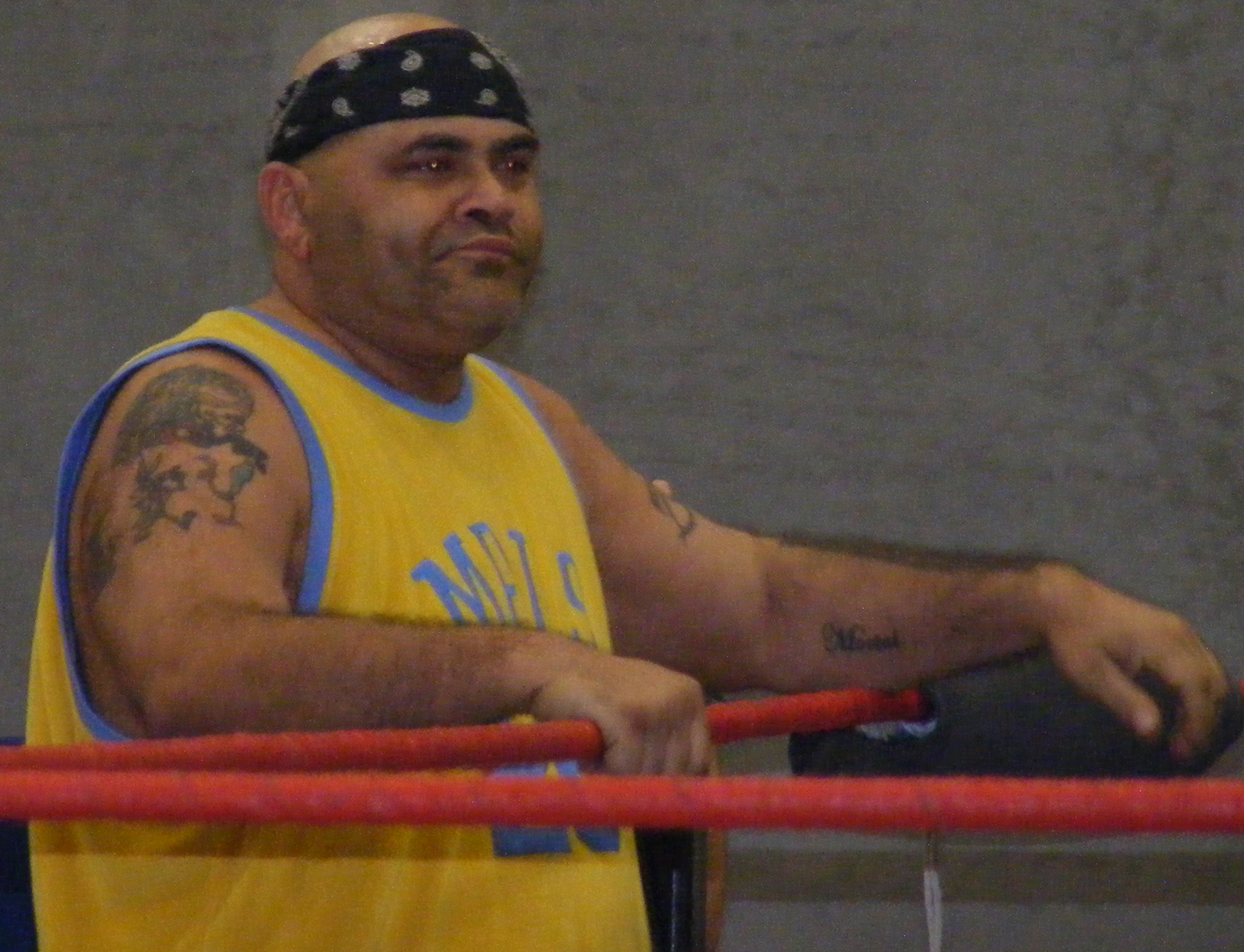
Inaugural CMLL World Heavyweight Champion Konnan el Bárbaro (depicted in 2011)

The tournament to crown the inaugural CMLL World Heavyweight Champion ran from May 24 to June 9, 1991, and featured 16 competitors. The first round of the tournament saw two eight-man battle royals, each ending when four wrestlers were left in the ring. This was used to cut the field in half with the last four remaining wrestlers from each match advancing to the next round. Konnan, Rayo de Jalisco Jr., Black Magic, and Mascara Ano 2000 advanced in the first battle royal, while Brazo de Plata, Vampiro Canadiense, Universo 2000, and El Egipcio were eliminated. In the second battle royal, Nitron, Pierroth Jr., Pirata Morgan, and Cien Caras advanced while Fabulous Blondie, Gran Markus Jr., Máscara Sagrada, and El Egipcio (Note: Herodes was originally scheduled to compete but did not show up. El Egipcio wrestled in his place despite having already lost a tournament match.) were eliminated. The second round saw another pair of battle royals with four men in each, ending when two wrestlers were left in the ring. This narrowed the tournament down to the final four wrestlers, who faced off in traditional semi-finals matches, before the final match to crown the inaugural champion.

Tournament results

Semifinals
1	Konnan	W
4	Rayo de Jalisco Jr.
3	Nitron
2	Cien Caras	W

Final
Konnan	W
Cien Caras

=== 1992 ===
After Cien Caras left CMLL for AAA in 1992, CMLL decided to hold a traditional 16-man single-elimination tournament to crown a new World Heavyweight Champion. The tournament ran from October 30 to November 20, 1992. On the first night of the tournament, all 16 competitors competed in a battle royal where the order of elimination determined the pairings for the first round. The last two wrestlers were Vampiro and El Egipico, who faced off in the last of the first round matches. The first two matches of the first round were held on November 3 at CMLL's weekly "Martes de Coliseo" show where Rayo de Jalisco Jr. and Rick Patterson both won their respective matches, followed by Jalisco Jr. winning his quarterfinal match the same night. On November 6 at the weekly CMLL Super Viernes show, King Haku and Brazo de Plata advanced in the first round with King Haku qualifying for the semi-final match with another victory. On November 8, an additional tournament match was held with Pirata Morgan advancing to the second round. The November 10 show saw Black Magic and Kahoz advance to face each other, with Black Magic moving to the semi-finals. On November 11, CMLL held the final first round and quarterfinal match, which Vampiro won, and then held both the semi-finals on the same night. By the end of the night, Black Magic and Jalisco Jr. qualified for the final. The following week at the November 20 Super Viernes, Black Magic won the finals and became the third CMLL World Heavyweight Champion.

Tournament results

First round
Rayo de Jalisco Jr.	W
Sultan Gargola
MS-1
Rick Patterson	W
King Haku	W
Popetikus
Brazo de Plata	W
Aaron Grundy
Black Magic	W
Gran Markus Jr.
Troglodita
Kahos I	W
Vampiro	W
El Egipcio
Pirata Morgan	W
Masakre

Second round
Rayo de Jalisco Jr.	W
Rick Patterson
King Haku	W
Brazo de Plata
Black Magic	W
Kahoz I
Pirata Morgan
Vampiro	W

Semifinals
Rayo de Jalisco Jr.	W
King Haku
Black Magic	W
Vampiro

Final
Rayo de Jalisco Jr.
Black Magic	W

=== 2011–2012 ===
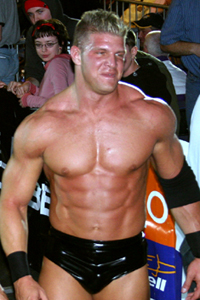
Marco Corleone, one of 10 competitors in the 2011 torneo cibernetico tournament match.

On December 18, 2011, CMLL announced that their World Heavyweight Champion Héctor Garza had decided to leave CMLL to work for Perros del Mal Producciones, vacating the championship. They also announced that the following week, there would be a tournament to determine a new champion. The main event of the December 25 Domigos Arena México show was a 10-man torneo cibernetico match designed to reduce the field of championship contenders from ten to two. The match ended when El Terrible pinned Marco Corleone to eliminate him, leaving El Terrible and Rush to face off the following week. On January 1, 2012, El Terrible defeated Rush in a two-out-of-three falls match to become the 17th overall champion.

Torneo cibernetico – December 25, 2011

#	Eliminated	Eliminated by
1	Olímpico	Metro
2	El Hijo del Fantasma	Rey Bucanero
3	Mr. Águila	Brazo de Plata
4	Metro	Mr. Niebla
5	Brazo de Plata	El Terrible
6	Rey Bucanero	Rush
7	Mr. Niebla	Marco Corleone
8	Marco Corleone	El Terrible
9	Co-Winners	El Terrible and Rush

=== 2017 ===
On May 22, 2017, reigning CMLL World Heavyweight Champion Máximo Sexy was fired by CMLL and the championship was declared vacant. The company announced that they were holding a 10-man torneo cibernetico on June 6, 2017, in Guadalajara, Jalisco to determine the next champion. The torneo ciberntico sides pitted Gran Guerrero, Euforia, El Terrible, Rush, and Pierroth against Marco Corleone, Dragón Rojo Jr., Kráneo, Mr. Niebla, and Rey Bucanero. The match came down to former champion El Terrible and Corleone, with Corleone gaining the deciding pinfall and the championship. With the victory, he became the 19th overall champion.

Torneo cibernetico order of elimination

#	Eliminated	Eliminated by
1	Rey Bucanero	
2	Dragón Rojo Jr.	Pierroth
3	Gran Guerrero	Rush
4	Euforia	Kráneo
5	Pierroth	Mr. Niebla
6	Kráneo	El Terrible
7	Rush	Corleone
8	Mr. Niebla	El Terrible
9	El Terrible	Corleone

== Reigns ==
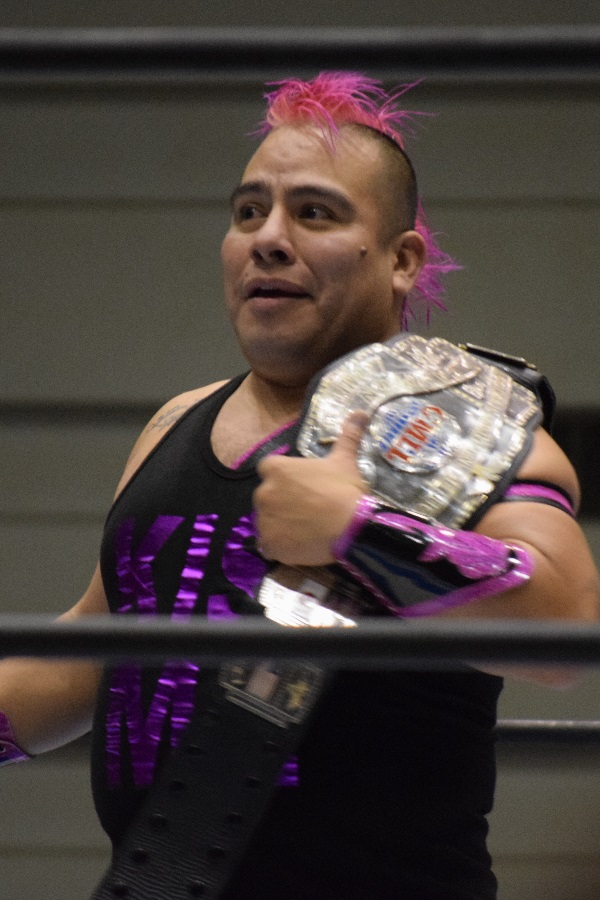
Former CMLL World Heavyweight Champion Máximo Sexy with the title belt

There have been 25 reigns shared between 20 different wrestlers, with five vacancies. Universo 2000 holds the record for the most reigns at three. His second reign is the longest in the title's history at 1,225 days, and he also holds the record for the longest combined reign with 2,555 days; Konnan, who was the inaugural champion, holds the record for the shortest reign at 70 days. Three champions never had a successful title defense: both Garza and Steel left CMLL before they could defend the championship, and Konnan lost the championship in his first defense.

CMLL has been forced to declare the championship vacant five times. Each time, the reigning champion left CMLL without losing the title in a match. Under normal circumstances, wrestlers give notice, or their contract is not renewed, and the championship transitions to a different wrestler. In the case of Cien Caras, Steel, Héctor Garza, and Marco Corleone, their departures from the company were so sudden and unexpected that no plans were in place and CMLL had to organize a tournament to determine the next champion. In Máximo Sexy's case, he was fired from the company while still the champion, causing the championship to be vacated as a result.

== Footnotes ==
Sporting positions
Preceded by NWA World Heavyweight Championship	Consejo Mundial de Lucha Libre's top heavyweight championship 1991–present	Succeeded by Current
