= Juicio Final (2011) =

Mexican professional wrestling supercard show

- The official poster for Juicio Final, showing the masks of La Máscara (red) and Averno (black) that were on the line in the main event
- Promotion: Consejo Mundial de Lucha Libre
- Date: June 17, 2011
- City: Mexico City, Mexico
- Venue: Arena México
- Attendance: 13,500

Pay-per-view chronology
← Previous; 55. Aniversario de Arena México	Next → Leyenda de Azul

El Juicio Final chronology
← Previous; 2005	Next → 2012

El Juicio Final (2011) (Spanish for "The Final Judgement") was a professional wrestling major show event produced by Consejo Mundial de Lucha Libre (CMLL) that took place on June 17, 2011 in Arena México, Mexico City, Mexico. This was the thirteenth time that CMLL used the name "Jucio Final" for one of their major shows.

The main event of the show was a Lucha de Apuestas, Mask vs. Mask match between Averno and La Máscara. After losing the match, Averno removed his mask and revealed that he was Renato Ruíz Cortes, 34-year-old 16-year veteran from Mexico City. Just hours prior to the start of the event, former CMLL wrestler Tony Rivera orchestrated a protest, blocking the entrance to Arena México with a fleet of buses, due to feeling that CMLL was not paying their wrestlers enough. After initial fears that the event might be cancelled, Rivera finally ended the protest after a meeting with CMLL management.

== Production ==
=== Background ===
For decades Arena México, the main venue of the Mexican professional wrestling promotion Consejo Mundial de Lucha Libre (CMLL), would close down in early December and remain closed into either January or February to allow for renovations as well as letting Circo Atayde occupy the space over the holidays. As a result, CMLL usually held a "end of the year" supercard show on the first or second Friday of December in lieu of their normal Super Viernes show. 1955 was the first year where CMLL used the name "El Juicio Final" ("The Final Judgement") for their year-end supershow. Until 2000 the Jucio Final name was always used for the year end show, but since 2000 has at times been used for shows outside of December. It is no longer an annually recurring show, but instead held intermittently sometimes several years apart and not always in the same month of the year either. All Juicio Final shows have been held in Arena México in Mexico City, Mexico which is CMLL's main venue, its "home".

=== Storylines ===
The event featured six professional wrestling matches with different wrestlers involved in pre-existing scripted feuds, plots and storylines. Wrestlers were portrayed as either heels (referred to as rudos in Mexico, those that portray the "bad guys") or faces (técnicos in Mexico, the "good guy" characters) as they followed a series of tension-building events, which culminated in a wrestling match or series of matches.

== Results ==
No.	Results	Stipulations
1	Metro and Stuka Jr. defeated La Ola Amarilla (Okumura and Yoshihashi)	Best two-out-of-three falls tag team match
2	La Fuerza TRT (Rey Bucanero, El Terrible and El Texano Jr.) defeated Brazo de Plata, El Hijo del Fantasma and Valiente	Best two-out-of-three falls six-man "lucha libre rules" tag team match
3	Team Alpha (Diamante, Hijo del Signo and Negro Casas) defeated Team Delta (Blue Panther, Fuego and Pólvora)	Best two-out-of-three falls six-man "lucha libre rules" tag team match; Forjando un Ídolo: La Guerra Continúa semifinal match
4	Team Charly (Atlantis, Delta and Guerrero Maya Jr.) defeated Team Bravo (Ángel de Oro, Rey Escorpión and Último Guerrero) by disqualification	Best two-out-of-three falls six-man "lucha libre rules" tag team match; Forjando un Ídolo: La Guerra Continúa semifinal match
5	Jon Strongman, Rush and La Sombra defeated Mephisto, Mr. Niebla and Shinsuke Nakamura	Best two-out-of-three falls six-man "lucha libre rules" tag team match
6	La Máscara defeated Averno	Best two-out-of-three falls Lucha de Apuestas, Mask vs. Mask match
