= Lucha Kingdom =

2026 New Japan Pro-Wrestling and Consejo Mundial de Lucha Libre pay-per-view event

- Promotional poster
- Promotion(s): New Japan Pro-Wrestling; Consejo Mundial de Lucha Libre
- Date: November 16, 2026
- City: Mexico City, Mexico
- Venue: Arena Mexico

New Japan Pro-Wrestling events chronology
← Previous; Power Struggle	Next → Wrestle Kingdom 21

Consejo Mundial de Lucha Libre events chronology
← Previous; International Women's Grand Prix	Next → Fantastica Mania

Lucha Kingdom was a professional wrestling pay-per-view and livestreaming supercard event produced by Consejo Mundial de Lucha Libre (CMLL) and New Japan Pro-Wrestling (NJPW). It took place on November 16, 2026 at Arena Mexico in Mexico City, Mexico and was streamed live on YouTube in Spanish, MyAEW in English, and NJPW World in Japanese.

== Production ==
Other on-screen personnel
Role:	Name:
Ring announcer	Omar Garcia

=== Background ===
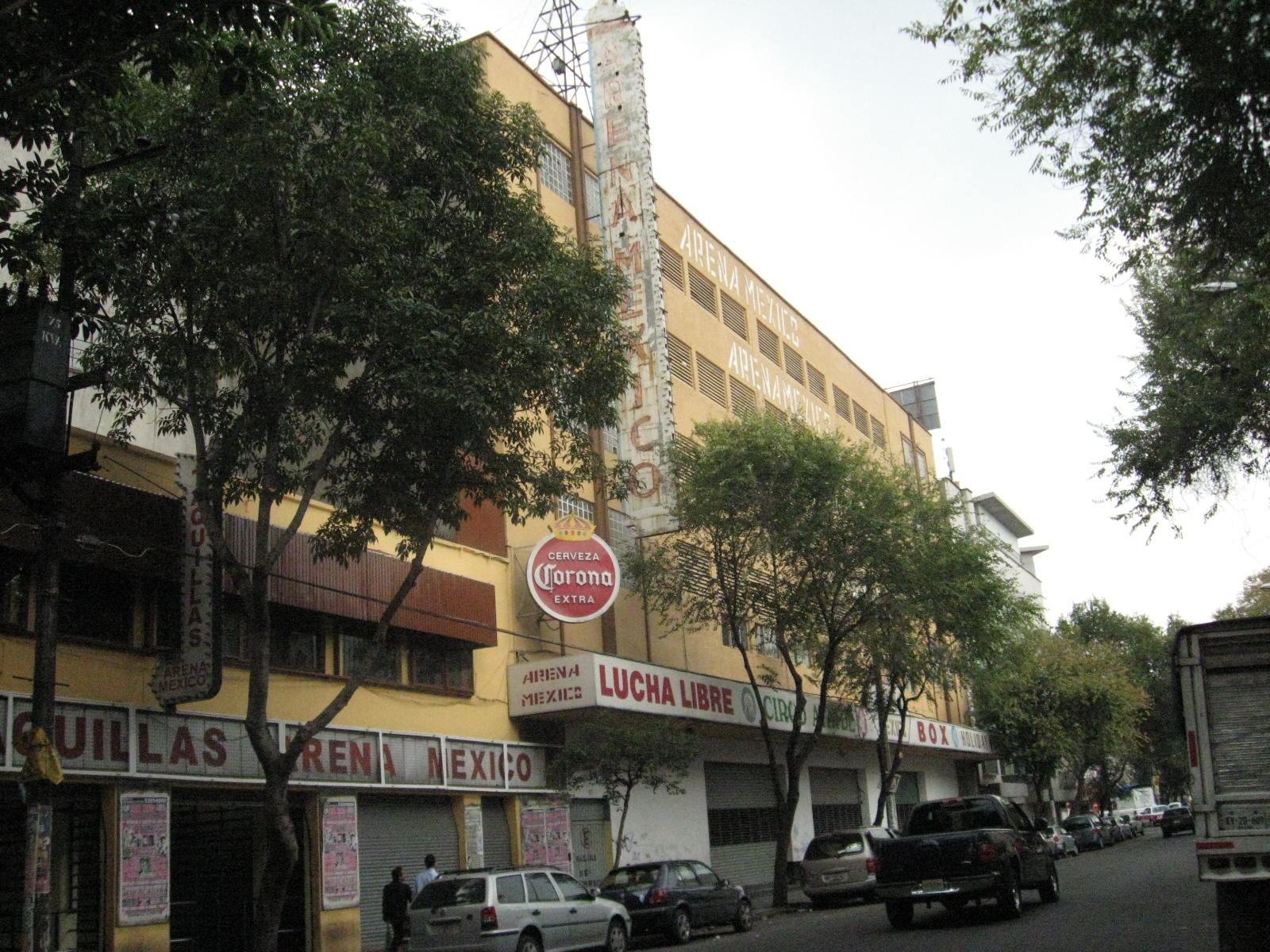
Lucha Kingdom took place at the historic Arena México in Mexico City, Mexico, which is owned and operated by New Japan Pro-Wrestling's Mexican partner promotion and co-producers of the event, Consejo Mundial de Lucha Libre.

In 2008, CMLL established a working relationship with New Japan Pro-Wrestling as part of "G-1 World", several wrestlers have since toured between the two companies winning titles, including Místico winning the IWGP Junior Heavyweight Championship and Jushin Thunder Liger winning the CMLL Universal Championship tournament. Since 2011, the two promotions have annually co-promoted events in Japan, under the name Fantastica Mania beginning with a two-night event at Korakuen Hall in Tokyo.

On June 30, 2023, CMLL and NJPW presented the first Fantastica Mania show outside of Japan at Arena Mexico in Mexico City, Mexico with Rocky Romero defending the NWA World Historic Welterweight Championship against Volador Jr. in the main event. CMLL also began holding Fantastica Mania shows internationally with the first UK show taking place on September 23, 2023 in Manchester, England with Revolution Pro Wrestling, and the first United States show taking place on July 13, 2024 in San Jose, California. Following the conclusion of the 2026 edition of Fantastica Mania Mexico on June 19, CMLL and NJPW announced that they would be holding the inagurual Lucha Kingdom on November 16, 2026 at Arena Mexico.

=== Storylines ===
The card consisted of matches that result from scripted storylines, where wrestlers portrayed villains, heroes, or less distinguishable characters in scripted events that built tension and culminate in a wrestling match or series of matches, with results predetermined by NJPW and CMLL's writers. Storylines were played out at NJPW and CMLL events, and across the promotions' social media platforms.

== Results ==
No.	Results	Stipulations	Times
1	Brillante Jr., Capitán Suicida, and Rey Pegasus defeated Yoh, Master Wato, and Okumura by pinfall	Six-man tag team match	9:09
2	Syuri (c) defeated Kira by pinfall	Singles match for the IWGP Women's Championship	12:38
3	Galeón Fantasma (Zandokan Jr., Difunto, Barboza, and Furia Roja) defeated Kushida, Black Tiger, Yutani, and Shoma Kato by pinfall	Eight-man tag team match	14:35
4	House of Torture (Douki and Sho) defeated La Fuerza Poblana (Xelhua and Guerrero Maya Jr.) by pinfall	Tag team match	11:03
5	Unbound Co. (Titán and Taiji Ishimori) defeated Los Hermanos Chávez (Angel de Oro and Niebla Roja) (c) and United Empire (Templario and Francesco Akira) by pinfall	Three-way tag team match for the NJPW Strong Openweight Tag Team Championship	8:30
6	Soberano Jr. defeated Shota Umino by pinfall	Singles match	13:07
7	Konosuke Takeshita defeated Bárbaro Cavernario by pinfall	Singles match	13:53
8	Zack Sabre Jr. defeated Hechicero (c) by pinfall	Singles match for the CMLL World Heavyweight Championship	20:43
9	Mistico and Último Guerrero defeated Yota Tsuji and Hirooki Goto by pinfall	Relevos Increíbles tag team match	15:40
(c) / – the champion(s) heading into the match
