= Mark Jindrak =

American professional wrestler (born 1977)

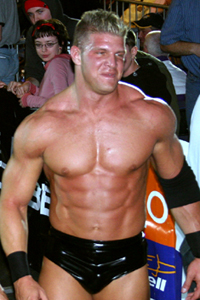
- Jindrak in 2005

Personal information
- Born: Mark Robert Jindrak; June 26, 1977 (age 49) Throop, New York, U.S.
- Education: Keuka College
- Spouse: Miroslava Luna (m. 2015)
- Children: 2

Professional wrestling career
- Ring name(s): Marco Corleone; Mark Jindrak; Sodom
- Billed height: 6 ft 6 in (198 cm)
- Billed weight: 253 lb (115 kg)
- Billed from: Auburn, New York
- Trained by: Paul Orndorff
- Debut: March 2, 1999
- Retired: 2024

Mark Robert Jindrak (born June 26, 1977) is an American professional wrestler. He is best known for his appearances with World Championship Wrestling (WCW) and World Wrestling Entertainment (WWE) under his birth name, and for his appearances with Consejo Mundial de Lucha Libre (CMLL) under the ring name Marco Corleone. He is a former CMLL World Heavyweight Champion, CMLL World Trios Champion, and WCW World Tag Team Champion.

== Professional wrestling career ==
=== World Championship Wrestling (1999–2001) ===
Jindrak trained in the WCW Power Plant under Paul Orndorff. He made his WCW debut on the March 2, 1999, taping of WCW Saturday Night, teaming with Chuck Palumbo as "The Soul Surfers" in a loss to Disorderly Conduct. He was promoted to the main WCW roster in June 2000 under the Vince Russo era where he formed a tag team with fellow Power Plant graduate Sean O'Haire. In August 2000, Jindrak and O'Haire helped form The Natural Born Thrillers with Mike Sanders, Shawn Stasiak, Chuck Palumbo, Johnny "The Bull" Stamboli, and Reno. They were briefly "coached" by Kevin Nash. In September 2000, Jindrak won the World Tag Team Championship with O'Haire for the first time, despite being relatively new in the business. The pair won the World Tag Team Championship once more before splitting in early January 2001 when Jindrak would begin teaming with Stasiak instead. The team was short-lived, as Stasiak went on to pick up the managerial service of Stacy Keibler and Jindrak was taken off of television.

=== World Wrestling Federation / Entertainment (2001-2005) ===
==== The Alliance and teaming with Garrison Cade (2001–2004) ====
After the World Wrestling Federation purchased WCW in March 2001, Jindrak came into the company in July 2001 as part of The Alliance that invaded the WWF roster. Jindrak wrestled in dark matches and at house shows throughout July. His first televised debut was on the July 28, 2001, episode of WWF Jakked/Metal, defeating Jerry Lynn. In late August of that year Mark Jindrak was sent to the Heartland Wrestling Association. There he was a member of Team WCW along with Mike Sanders, Johnny The Bull, Reno, Jason Jett, Lash LeRoux, Shannon Moore, Evan Karagias, Kwee Wee, Elix Skipper, and Jamie Knoble. In October 2001 Jindrak was moved to Ohio Valley Wrestling (OVW) for training until March 2002 when he suffered a knee injury. Jindrak returned to OVW in July 2002.

He also returned to WWE on the October 13, 2002, episode Sunday Night Heat defeating Justin Credible. He made a few more appearances on Heat in late 2002, defeating wrestlers such as Credible, Raven and Stevie Richards until suffering an ankle injury. Jindrak returned to OVW in March 2003 following his recovery and joined Kenny Bolin's "Bolin Services" stable and teamed with Garrison Cade while in OVW.

Jindrak was soon called up by WWE. Triple H would reveal on his 2013 Triple H - Thy Kingdom Come DVD that Jindrak was originally planned to be in Evolution alongside himself, Ric Flair, and Randy Orton. This claim was further confirmed by vignettes filmed that feature Jindrak with Evolution. However, for then-undisclosed reasons, his spot as the Arn Anderson-like enforcer of the group ended up going to Batista instead. This would be elaborated on in 2020 in the Evolution episode of the WWE Network series Ruthless Aggression, when it was revealed that Vince McMahon wanted Jindrak in the group to replace Batista due to his triceps injuries in 2003. However, Triple H felt that while Jindrak had the talent, he lacked the maturity for the group and felt that he was dragging Randy Orton down. Jindrak, who made his first WWE programming appearance in 15 years in the interview, agreed with Triple H's assessment.

After being pulled out of the Evolution angle, Jindrak joined the Raw brand on July 7, 2003, episode of Raw as a face against Chris Jericho in a losing effort. On the July 19 episode of Heat, Jindrak formed a tag team with Garrison Cade by defeating the World Tag Team Champions La Résistance in a non-title match, thus earning a title shot against La Résistance on the July 28 episode of Raw but failed to win the titles. They would become a staple in Raw's tag team division by feuding with La Résistance, Evolution and The Dudley Boyz over the tag team titles. At Armageddon, Jindrak and Cade participated in a tag team turmoil match for the World Tag Team Championship and eliminated The Hurricane and Rosey and the team of Val Venis and Lance Storm before being eliminated by Dudley Boyz. On the March 1, 2004, episode of Raw, Jindrak and Cade defeated Rosey and The Hurricane to qualify for a fatal four-way match for the World Tag Team Championship at WrestleMania XX, which they failed to win.

==== Teaming and feuding with Luther Reigns (2004–2005) ====
Jindrak's team with Garrison Cade ended when Jindrak was drafted to the SmackDown! brand on March 22, 2004. He made his debut as a member of SmackDown on the March 27 episode of Velocity, during which he appeared as "The Reflection of Perfection", a narcissistic heel gimmick obsessed with his own physique, similar to Lex Luger's "Narcissist" character. He defeated Tyson Dux in his first match as part of the SmackDown! roster. On April 8, 2004, Jindrak gained Theodore Long's managerial services for a brief period until the pair split in July when Long turned face and became the general manager of SmackDown! while Jindrak remained on Velocity. Jindrak was initially pushed with an undefeated streak against the likes of Scotty 2 Hotty, Hardcore Holly, Shannon Moore, Spike Dudley, Orlando Jordan, Funaki and Billy Kidman during his first few months on the SmackDown! roster before suffering his first loss in three months against Charlie Haas on the July 3 episode of Velocity.

In September, Jindrak aligned himself with Kurt Angle and Luther Reigns to assist Angle in assaulting and shaving Big Show bald during the fifth anniversary episode of SmackDown!. Jindrak and Reigns continued to serve as Kurt Angle's proteges until February 2005, at which point they split from Angle to continue their own feud with The Undertaker. However, Jindrak and Reigns' team began to have a falling out, most notably after they lost to Undertaker in a "Double Jeopardy" handicap match on the February 24, 2005, episode of SmackDown! because of Jindrak submitting to a triangle choke. The following week, Jindrak and Reigns lost a Tag Team Championship match against Eddie Guerrero and Rey Mysterio. Following the loss, Jindrak turned face by getting into a fight with Reigns and knocking him out with a left hook. On the March 10 episode of SmackDown!, Jindrak defeated Reigns in a singles match. After this, Jindrak became a low-card star who performed on Velocity and only appeared on SmackDown! to job against other wrestlers, during which he alternated between face and heel alignments. On the May 28 episode of Velocity, Jindrak unsuccessfully faced Orlando Jordan for the United States Championship. He then wrestled his last match on the SmackDown! brand on the June 18 episode of Velocity, which he lost to René Duprée. On June 30, Jindrak became one of the last-minute trades in the 2005 WWE Draft Lottery, returning him back to the Raw brand. However, Jindrak never made his Raw re-debut, as he was released from his contract on July 5, 2005.

=== Japan and Consejo Mundial de Lucha Libre (2006–2009) ===
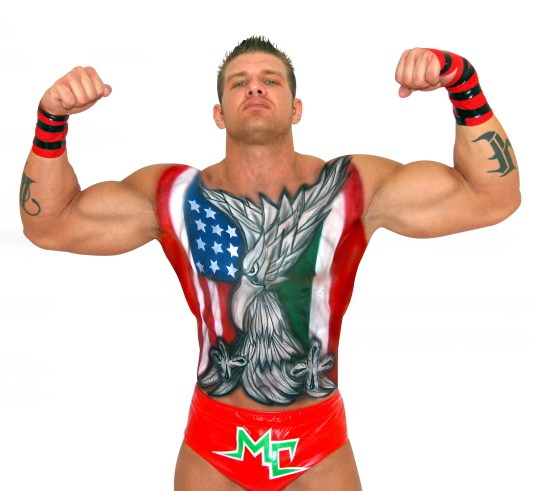
Jindrak in 2006.

Following his departure from WWE, Jindrak toured New Japan Pro-Wrestling in 2006, where he was primarily used as a low-carder. He did, however, pick up a surprise win over long-time veteran Osamu Nishimura during the tour. Soon after, Jindrak began working for the Japanese promotion HUSTLE as "Sodom", teaming with Gomorrah.

In late 2006, Jindrak began working for the Mexican promotion Consejo Mundial de Lucha Libre under the name Marco Corleone. As a part of his new ring name, which he derived from The Godfather, Corleone also accentuated his Italian American heritage as a part of his new gimmick, which included allying with fellow WCW and WWE alumnus Johnny Stamboli. Initially a rudo (heel), Corleone turned into a technico (face) because of crowd support. In 2008, it was announced that Jindrak had been officially banned from performing at wrestling shows in Tijuana, Mexico, for a year due to him pulling his tights down exposing his buttocks to Damien 666.

=== AAA and Perros del Mal (2009–2010) ===
On March 15, 2009, Jindrak, under his Marco Corleone ring name, made a surprise jump from CMLL to AAA, appearing as a surprise corner man for Vampiro during AAA's 2009 Rey de Reyes show. Corleone helped Vampiro win the match against AAA's top heel Konnan. On June 13, 2009, at Triplemanía XVII Corleone teamed with Latin Lover against La Hermandad 187 (Nicho El Millonario and Joe Líder) in a match for the World Tag Team Championship, but were unsuccessful. On March 22, 2010, AAA released Jindrak. Corleone later stated that he had initially only signed a one-year contract with AAA and had declined to re-sign. On April 11, 2010, Mexican promotion Perros del Mal announced that they had signed Jindrak, still using the ring name Marco Corleone, to a contract.

=== Lucha Libre USA (2010–2012) ===
Corleone competed on MTV's lucha libre show, Lucha Libre USA. He became involved with the promotion shortly after leaving AAA in early 2010, and was involved in finding and signing wrestlers for the show. On December 12, 2010, Corleone, Charly Malice and R. J. Brewer were defeated in a four-way elimination match by Lizmark, Jr., who became the inaugural Heavyweight Champion in the process. This episode aired on tape delay on October 1, 2011. On October 3, 2012, Corleone unsuccessfully challenged in a three-way match for the LLUSA Heavyweight Championship losing to R. J. Brewer and the match also included Lizmark Jr.

=== Return to CMLL (2011–2018) ===
On December 10, 2011, CMLL announced that Corleone would return to the promotion on December 16 at CMLL's Sin Piedad show. In his return match, Corleone, Máximo and Rush defeated Mr. Niebla, Negro Casas and Rey Bucanero in two straight falls. After the event, the trio of Corleone, Rush and Máximo was given the name La Tercia Sensación, which was later changed to El Bufete del Amor. On February 19, 2012, El Bufete del Amor defeated Los Hijos del Averno (Averno, Ephesto and Mephisto) to win the World Trios Championship. On August 24, 2012, Corleone was defeated by Hiroshi Tanahashi in the quarterfinal round of the Universal Championship Tournament. In the fall of 2012 El Bufete began a feud against the Mexican National Trios Champions Los Invasores (Volador Jr., Mr. Águila and Kraneo). The two teams fought several occasions with El Bufete's World Trios Championship on the line, while Los Invasores' Mexican National Trios Championship being passed over was compared to the more prestigious CMLL title. Corleone was forced to team up with Kraneo for the 2013 Torneo Nacional de Parejas Increibles ("National Incredible Pairs Tournament"), a tag team tournament teaming up wrestlers who would never team up otherwise, often because they are rivals, would be forced to work together. The team lost to Shocker and Mr. Niebla in the opening round because of their inability to get along for only match. In May, Corleone was sidelined with a knee injury, leading to CMLL stripping him, Máximo and Rush of the World Trios Championship.

On August 2, 2013, Corleone returned from injury teaming with La Sombra and Rush defeating Averno, Mephisto and Volador Jr. in a two out of three falls match. On September 16, 2014, Corleone and Rush defeated El Terrible and Rey Escorpión to win La Copa CMLL. On December 7, Corleone was knocked unconscious during a match with El Terrible, after being hit on the back of the head by a ring rope. He regained consciousness shortly thereafter and was reportedly doing well. On March 17, 2015, Los Ingobernables (Corleone and Rush) unsuccessfully challenged Negro Casas and Shocker in a two out of three falls match for the World Tag Team Championship.

On June 6, 2017, Corleone defeated Euforia, Dragón Rojo Jr., El Terrible, Gran Guerrero, Kráneo, Mr. Niebla, Pierroth, Rey Bucanero and Rush in a torneo cibernetico elimination match to win the World Heavyweight Championship, the first singles title of his career. On June 18, Corleone made his first successful title defense against El Terrible. On August 22, 2018, Corleone had to vacate the title due to an injury and thus confirmed his departure from CMLL. He took a hiatus.

=== Return to Mexico (2022–2024) ===
Jindrak returned to wrestling in April 2022 for Robles Promotions in Mexico.

== Other media ==
Jindrak has appeared on several Mexican game shows, soap operas, television shows and magazine covers. He was also named "Best Body in Mexico". In 2012, Jindrak starred in the Mexican telenovela Porque el amor manda as Ury Petrovsky. Jindrak tried out for the film Remember the Titans, and was offered a role as a football player. As he was in training at the WCW Power Plant at the time however, he turned the role down.

Jindrak wrote a book in Spanish entitled Marco Corleone: las primera luchas de mi vida (Marco Corleone: the first fights of my life) for children, to help them cope with bullying in schools.

Jindrak has also made appearances in video games. He made an appearance in WWE Day of Reckoning, WWE SmackDown! vs Raw, WWE SmackDown! vs. Raw 2006, AND 1 Streetball, and Lucha Libre AAA: Héroes del Ring.

=== Filmography ===
Television
Year	Title	Role	Notes
2005	MTV's The 70s House	Himself	Season 1, Episode 3
2010	Sábado Gigante	Himself	
2012–13	Porque el amor manda	Ury Petrovsky	
2013	Noches con Platanito	Himself	
2014–15	Mi corazón es tuyo	Mike	
2017	La doble vida de Estela Carrillo	Asdrúbal	
2017	Como dice el dicho		Season 7, Episode 55

== Personal life ==
Jindrak has a degree in marketing. He also played basketball for the Keuka Storm at the NCAA Division III level. Jindrak has the highest recorded vertical leap in WWE history, and his personal best is over 42 inches (110 cm).

His father is of German descent and his mother is of Italian descent. On November 3, 2015, Jindrak announced that he married Mexican fashion designer and model Miroslava Luna. The couple reside with their son in Knoxville, Tennessee.

In July 2016, Jindrak was named part of a class action lawsuit filed against WWE which alleged that wrestlers incurred traumatic brain injuries during their tenure and that the company concealed the risks of injury. The suit was litigated by attorney Konstantine Kyros, who has been involved in a number of other lawsuits against WWE. The case was dismissed by US District Judge Vanessa Lynne Bryant in September 2018.

== Championships and accomplishments ==
- Consejo Mundial de Lucha Libre
  - CMLL World Heavyweight Championship (1 time)
  - CMLL World Trios Championship (1 time) – with Máximo and Rush
  - Copa CMLL (2014) – with Rush
  - Cuadrangular de Parejas (2016) – with Kushida
- International Wrestling Revolution Group
  - Copa Higher Power (2006)
- Pro Wrestling Illustrated
  - Ranked No. 54 of the top 500 singles wrestlers in the PWI 500 in 2005
- Toryumon Mexico
  - Suzuki Cup (2007) – with Kensuke Sasaki and Último Dragón
  - Suzuki Cup (2008) – with Alex Koslov and Último Dragón
- World Championship Wrestling
  - WCW World Tag Team Championship (2 times) – with Sean O'Haire

== Luchas de Apuestas record ==
Winner (wager)	Loser (wager)	Location	Event	Date	Notes
Shocker and Universo 2000 (hair)	Marco Corelone and Kenzo Suzuki (hair)	Mexico City	Sin Piedad	December 15, 2006	
Marco Corleone (hair)	Universo 2000 (hair)	Mexico City, Mexico	Homenaje a Dos Leyendas	March 30, 2007	
Marco Corleone (hair)	Lizmark Jr. (hair)	Mexico City	CMLL show	October 17, 2008	

== See also ==
- El Bufete del Amor
- The Natural Born Thrillers
