= Universo 2000 =

Mexican professional wrestler (1963–2018)

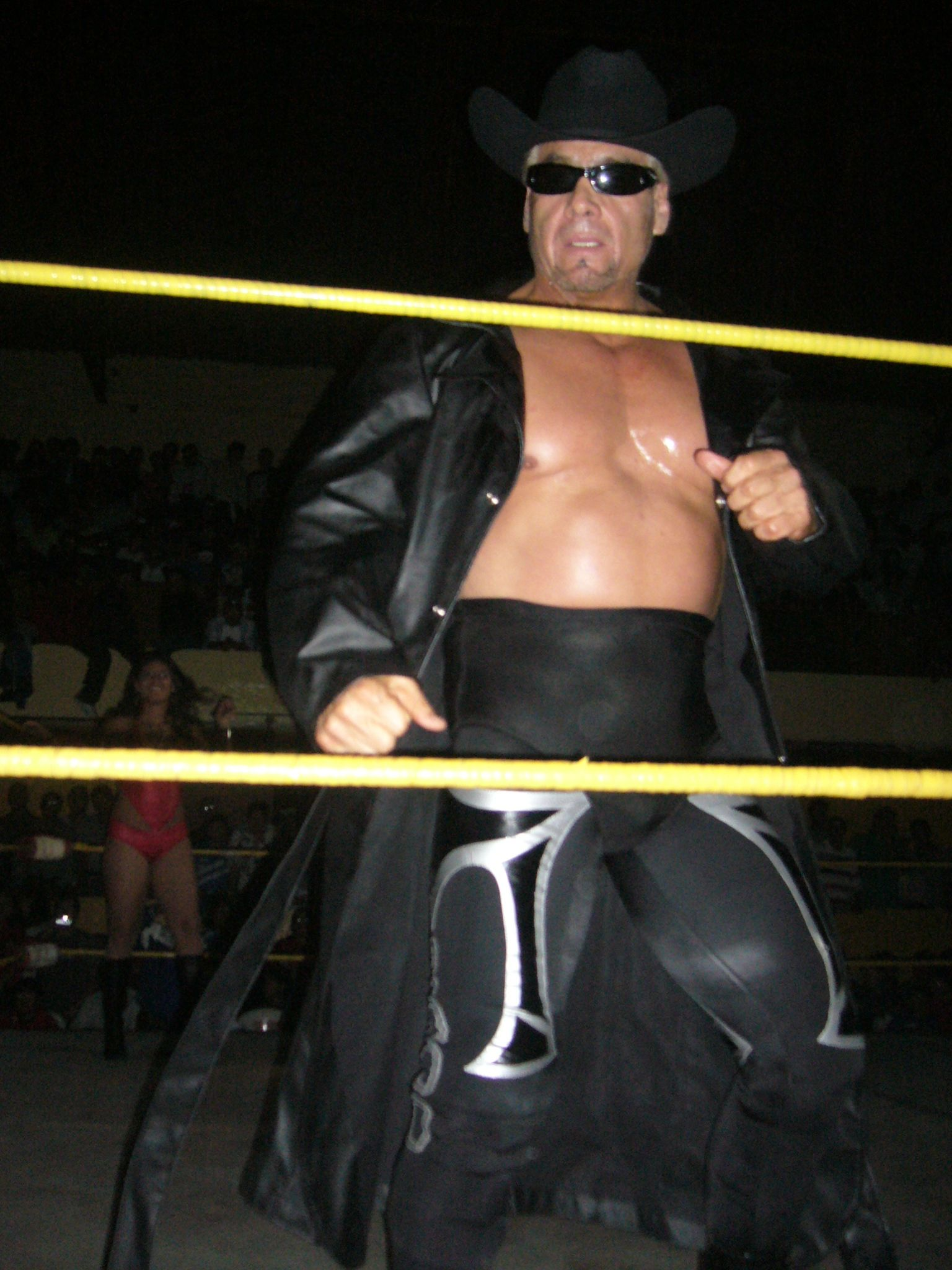
- Universo 2000 prior to a match in 2005

Personal information
- Born: Andrés Reyes González; April 18, 1963 Santa Anita, Jalisco, Mexico
- Died: May 1, 2018 (aged 55) Mexico
- Children: Universo 2000 Jr.
- Relatives: Cien Caras (brother); Máscara Año 2000 (brother); El Cuatrero (nephew); Sansón (nephew); Forastero (nephew); Máscara Año 2000 Jr. (nephew)

Professional wrestling career
- Ring names: Espacial; Universo 2000; Universo Dos Mil
- Billed height: 1.82 m (5 ft 11 1/2 in)
- Billed weight: 102 kg (225 lb)
- Trained by: Diablo Velasco; Rafael Salamanca
- Debut: June 15, 1985

Andrés Reyes González (April 18, 1963 – May 1, 2018) was a Mexican professional wrestler, who was best known under the ring name Universo 2000. Reyes made his professional wrestling debut in 1985 and worked for Consejo Mundial de Lucha Libre (CMLL), Lucha Libre AAA Worldwide (AAA) and, International Wrestling Revolution Group (IWRG). Reyes was a part of a wrestling family that includes his brothers Carmelo (who wrestles as Cien Caras) and Jesús (Máscara Año 2000) as well as his nephew who wrestles under the name Máscara Año 2000 Jr. Together with his brothers he formed a group called Los Hermanos Dinamita, also known as Los Capos when they teamed up with Apolo Dantés. Reyes was the only three-time CMLL World Heavyweight Champion in the history of the championship. He was originally an masked wrestler, but lost his mask in a match against El Canek on September 17, 2004.

== Professional wrestling career ==
Andrés Reyes grew up watching his older brothers as they began their professional wrestling careers. His older brother Carmelo made his pro debut in 1974 when Andrés was just 11 years old and adopted the ring name Cien Caras. His second brother Jesús made his professional debut in 1977 with a 14-year-old Andrés Reyes watching, Jesús would later become known as Máscara Año 2000. After watching his brothers compete and after training under legendary Lucha trainer Diablo Velazco it was finally time for the third Reyes brother to make his debut. The 22-year-old Andrés Reyes made his debut on June 15, 1985, under the ring name Espacial, but soon after changed both name and mask to become Universo 2000, the character he is most commonly associated with.

=== Empresa Mexicana de Lucha Libre ===
Both of his brothers were working regularly for Empresa Mexicana de Lucha Libre (EMLL) and through them Universo 2000 began working full-time for EMLL by the late 1980s, often teaming up with Cien Caras and Máscara Año 2000 as a trio billed as Los Hermanos Dinamita ("The Dynamite Brothers"). Universo 2000 was originally chosen to be the wrestler to unmask the legendary Aníbal, who had returned for the big payday a mask loss is. But during the buildup promoter Benjamin Mora, who was bitter at EMLL for not working with him, revealed several of EMLL's plans including who was going to unmask Aníbal. CMLL decided to change their plans and in the end it was Máscara Año 2000, that unmasked Aníbal. In late 1990 and early 1991 EMLL changed their name to Consejo Mundial de Lucha Libre (CMLL). On August 11, 1991, Los Hermanos Dinamita won the Mexican National Trios Championship when they defeated Los Movie Stars (Atlantis, Máscara Sagrada and Octagón) to win the title.

=== Asistencia Asesoría y Administración ===
In mid-1992 then CMLL booker Antonio Peña decided to break away from the promotion and form his own promotion called Asistencia Asesoría y Administración, wanting to produce his own style of wrestling shows that differed from the very conservative way CMLL ran things. Among the people that left CMLL to join AAA were the Reyes brothers, who took the Mexican National Trios title with them, this was made possible by the fact that CMLL did not outright own the championship but were given the rights to book the championship by the Mexico City Boxing and Wrestling Commission who actually owned all of the Mexican National wrestling championship. The Commission allowed Peña's promotion to take control of the titles after its creation in 1992. On April 29, 1992, Universo 2000 defeated Máscara Sagrada to win the Mexican National Light Heavyweight Championship; which, like the Trios title, had been brought to AAA from CMLL. Universo 2000 held the title for four months, losing it to Lizmark on September 18, 1992. Los Hermanos Dinamita held the trios championship until July 1993, when Los Infernales (El Satánico, Pirata Morgan and MS-1) defeated them. Los Hermanos Dinamita regained the championship in late 1993 or very early 1994 by defeating Los Infernales. In early 1994 Los Hermanos Dinamita began a feud with the Rudo (bad guy) trio Los Payasos, a trio of masked "evil clowns" (Coco Rojo, Coco Verde and Coco Amarillo) who underneath the clown costumes were very accomplished wrestlers. The two trios met in a match at Triplemanía II-A on April 24, 1994, where Los Payasos won the Trios title from Los Hermanos Dinamita. A few weeks later, at Triplemanía II-C Los Hermanos Dinamita gained a measure of revenge when they defeated Los Payasos in a Steel Cage Match. One of Universo 2000's last matches in AAA took place at Triplemanía III-C where Los Hermanos Dinamita teamed up with Jerry Estrada and Fishman to defeat Konnan, La Parka, Máscara Sagrada, Latin Lover and Perro Aguayo.

=== Return to CMLL ===
By mid-1996 Los Hermanos left AAA and returned to CMLL where they would become regular competitors for the next decade. The trio began working regularly with Apolo Dantés, forming a group called Los Capos ("The Bosses"), a rudo group that were heavily featured in CMLL's heavyweight division. In late 1997 Steel, then CMLL World Heavyweight Champion left CMLL to work for the World Wrestling Federation, vacating the championship. CMLL decided that instead of holding a tournament they booked a match with the three top heavyweights in the promotion at the time, with the winner becoming the next champion. On October 19, 1997, Universo 2000 defeated Cien Caras and Rayo de Jalisco, Jr. to win the championship. Universo 2000 defended the title three times during his reign: against Brazo de Plata, Máscara Sagrada, and Rayo de Jalisco Jr., before losing the championship to Rayo de Jalisco, Jr. on September 13, 1998. Universo 2000 regained the title on December 10, 1999, becoming only the second man to hold the Heavyweight title twice. Universo 2000's second reign became a recordbreaking reign in several areas, it was the longest to date as it lasted 1,225 days. He also became the champion with most successful title defenses in one reign as he defended the title 19 times against Mascara Sagrada, Brazo de Plata, Rayo de Jalisco Jr. 8 times, Villano IV, Lizmark, Jr., Mr. Niebla and Violencia.

Around 2000 Los Capos began a long running feud with Perro Aguayo, a storyline that would later include Aguayo's son Perro Aguayo, Jr. as well. On March 30, 2001, in the main event of CMLL's Juicio Final, Universo 2000 faced Aguayo in a Lucha de Apuesta match where Aguayo risked his hair and Universo 2000 risked his mask. Universo 2000 won, with a little help from Los Capos, and shaved Aguayo bald after the match. On March 21, 2003, the makeshift team of Universo 2000, Black Tiger III and Dr. Wagner Jr. defeated La Ola Lagunero ("The Lagoon Wave"; Atlantis Black Warrior and Mr. Niebla) to win the CMLL World Trios Championship On April 18, Universo 2000's second run with the CMLL World Heavyweight Championship came to an end when Mr. Niebla defeated him to win the heavyweight title. The team held the title for 16 months, until they lost to Black Warrior, Rayo de Jalisco, Jr. and El Canek on July 9, 2004. After being masked since his debut in 1985 Universo 2000 lost a Lucha de Apuesta match to El Canek, the main event of CMLL's 71st Anniversary Show in a match that also included Dr. Wagner, Jr. and Rayo de Jalisco, Jr. Following his unmasking Universo 2000 won the 2004 Leyenda de Azul (Blue legend tournament). Universo 2000 became the only three time CMLL World Heavyweight Champion when he defeated Mr. Niebla on October 12, 2004. Over the next couple of years Universo 2000 defended his title against Dos Caras, Jr. twice, Mr. Niebla and Máscara Sagrada. The feud with Perro Aguayo, Jr. continued after his father's retirement in 2004 and also involved Perro's group La Furia del Norte ("The Northern Fury"). at CMLL's 72nd Anniversary Show Universo 2000 pinned Furia member Héctor Garza in a Lucha de Apuesta match that also included Perro Aguayo, Jr. On December 2, 2005, at the 2005 Juicio Final defeated Halloween in a Lucha de Apuesta match after applying the Black Hammer (Piledriver) to Halloween. The Black Hammer was used as a storyline explanation for Halloween taking some time off to have knee surgery. The storyline between Universo 2000 and Perro Aguayo, Jr. reached its conclusion at the 2006 Homenaje a Dos Leyendas show where Aguayo, Jr. defeated Universo 2000 in an Apueta match and shaved Universo 2000's hair off after the match. In late 2006 Universo 2000 teamed up with Shocker to work an extended storyline against Marco Corelone and Kenzo Suzuki. The team defeated Corleone and Suzuki in the main event of the 2006 Sin Piedad, taking the hair of both wrestlers in the process. Three months later at the 2007 Homenaje a Dos Leyendas Universo 2000 faced Marco Corleone in yet another Lucha de Apuesta match, however this time, Corleone was victorious and took Universo's hair. On July 8, 2007, Universo 2000's third and final reign as CMLL World Heavyweight Champion ended when Dos Caras, Jr. defeated him for the title. In late 2008, after an unsuccessful attempt at regaining the title, Universo 2000 left CMLL.

=== Los Invasores and independent circuit ===
In the 2010s Universo 2000 began working a more reduced schedule, working on select dates on the independent circuit, occasional appearances for International Wrestling Revolution Group (IWRG), where he teamed with his brother Máscara Año 2000. On May 10, 2010, during a match between Los Independientes and CMLL wrestlers, Universo 2000 and Máscara Año 2000 ran in to help Los Independientes beat up their opponents. The two sided with Los Independientes (Later renamed Los Invasores) in the storyline between independent wrestlers and CMLL. Both Universo 2000 and Máscara Año 2000 wrestled for CMLL for a period of time, including a singles match between long time rivals Universo 2000 and Rayo de Jalisco, Jr. for Rayo's WWA World Heavyweight Championship which Rayo de Jalisco, Jr. won. From late 2010 until early 2013 Universo 2000 worked select matches on the independent circuit, but made his return to CMLL in early 2013 during their press conference for the 2013 Homenaje a Dos Leyendas ("Homage to two legends") show where he challenged Rayo de Jalisco, Jr. to another match. The match was booked for the Dos Leyendas show with Universo 2000 teaming up with Mr. Niebla and El Terrible to lose to Rayo, Jr. Shocker and Rush.

== Personal life ==
Andrés Reyes was the youngest of the Reyes brothers to turn professional. His oldest brother Carmelo Reyes González wrestled as "Cien Caras" for many years and retired in 2005. His second oldest brother Jesús Reyes González wrestles as Máscara Año 2000 and several of his nephews have become professional wrestlers under the ring names El Hijo de Máscara Año 2000, Forastero, El Cuatrero and Sansón. In recent years Universo 2000 Jr. has begun working Mexico and he is believed to be a son of Andrés Reyes. Despite using the names El Hijo de Cien Caras ("The Son of Cien Caras") and Cien Caras, Jr. neither wrestler were actually related to the Reyes family but instead paid for the rights to use the ring characters and masks. The Mini-Estrella Pequeño Universo 2000 is also not a Reyes family member but a Mini who was allowed to use the name and mask some years ago when Universo 2000 still wrestled in CMLL and continues to use the character to this date.

== Illness and death ==
In 2016 Andrés Reyes suffered a minor heart attack, and suffered a second more severe heart attack on June 5, 2017, which forced him to be hospitalized. Almost a year later, on May 1, 2018, Reyes died at the age of 55.

== Championships and accomplishments ==
- Asistencia Asesoría y Administración
  - Mexican National Light Heavyweight Championship (1 time)
  - Mexican National Trios Championship (1 time) – with Cien Caras and Máscara Año 2000 (Note: Los Hermanos Dinamita took the Mexican National Trios title with them to AAA where they later won it again. Universo 2000 is a two time Mexican National Trios champion.)
- Consejo Mundial de Lucha Libre
  - CMLL World Heavyweight Championship (3 times)
  - CMLL World Trios Championship (1 time) – with Black Tiger III and Dr. Wagner Jr.
  - Mexican National Trios Championship (1 time) – with Cien Caras and Máscara Año 2000
  - Leyenda de Azul: 2004
- World Wrestling Organization
  - WWO World Heavyweight Championship (1 time)
- Wrestling Observer Newsletter
  - Wrestling Observer Newsletter Hall of Fame (2024) - with Cien Caras and Máscara Año 2000

== Luchas de Apuestas record ==
Winner (wager)	Loser (wager)	Location	Event	Date	Notes
Universo 2000 (mask)	Perro Aguayo (hair)	Mexico City	Juicio Final	March 30, 2001	
Universo 2000 (mask)	Bulldog (mask)	Mexico City	Live event	September 20, 2002	(Note: The last two wrestlers remaining in a Torneo cibernetico elimnationmatch where the last man pinned was unmasked.)
Universo 2000 (mask)	Pierroth Jr. (hair)	Mexico City	Sin Piedad	December 5, 2003	
El Canek (mask)	Universo 2000 (mask)	Mexico City	CMLL 71st Anniversary Show	September 17, 2004	(Note: The match that also included Dr. Wagner, Jr. and Rayo de Jalisco, Jr.)
Universo 2000 (hair)	Héctor Garza (hair)	Mexico City	CMLL 72nd Anniversary Show	September 16, 2005	(Note: The match also included Perro Aguayo, Jr.)
Universo 2000 (hair)	Halloween (hair)	Mexico City	Juicio Final	December 2, 2005	
Perro Aguayo Jr. (hair)	Universo 2000 (hair)	Mexico City	Homenaje a Dos Leyendas	March 17, 2006	
Shocker and Universo 2000 (hair)	Marco Corelone and Kenzo Suzuki (hair)	Mexico City	Sin Piedad	December 15, 2006	
Marco Corleone (hair)	Universo 2000 (hair)	Mexico City	Homenaje a Dos Leyendas	March 30, 2007	
Rayo de Jalisco Jr. (hair)	Universo 2000 (hair)	Mexico City	Todo x el Todo live event	June 22, 2013	
