= Diana La Cazadora =

Mexican professional wrestler (1978–2026)

Alma Corina Gutiérrez
Personal information
- Born: January 16, 1978 Madero, Tamaulipas, Mexico
- Died: August 8, 2026 (aged 48)

Professional wrestling career
- Ring name: Diana La Cazadora
- Billed height: 1.63 m (5 ft 4 in)
- Billed weight: 56 kg (123 lb)
- Trained by: Carnicero Aguilar; Centurion Negro
- Debut: August 24, 1997

Alma Corina Gutiérrez, (January 16, 1978 – August 8, 2026), better known by her ring name Diana La Cazadora, was a Mexican professional wrestler. She usually performed in Mexico and worked for Consejo Mundial de Lucha Libre (CMLL) for a number of years but most recently worked on the Mexican independent circuit as well as occasionally wrestling in the United States. Her name means "Diana the Huntress" in Spanish and is a reference to the Roman Goddess Diana the Huntress.

== Professional wrestling career ==
Diana La Cazadora began her professional wrestling career in 1997, initially wrestling in the area around her hometown of Monterrey, Nuevo León. At one point she held the Monterrey Woman's Championship. Later she would work for the Lucha Libre Femenil promotion, a promotion that only featured women's wrestling. During her time in LLF she won the LLF Junior Championship as well as the LLF Tag Team Championship, teaming with Nikki Roxx.

During the mid-2000s, she began wrestling for Consejo Mundial de Lucha Libre (CMLL), Mexico's largest and the world's oldest professional wrestling promotion. Since CMLL's women's division was not able to provide her with full-time work, she wrestled a lot around Monterrey as well as working as a traffic reporter for local television. Her job as a motorcycle based traffic reporter caused her to break a leg as she was hit by a car while covering another car accident. That injury kept Diana La Cazadora out of the ring from the end of 2005 till spring 2006.

On April 27, 2007, Diana La Cazadora was one of the participants in a 14-women Torneo cibernetico match that was one of the semi-finals in a tournament for the vacant Mexican National Women's Championship. Diana was eliminated by eventual cibernetico winner Marcela. In June 2007, Diana began a very intense storyline feud with La Amapola, a storyline that led to a rare female Lucha de Apuesta where both Diana and La Amapola "bet" their hair on the outcome of the match. On June 17, 2007, La Amapola defeated Diana La Cazadora two falls to one, after which Diana's hair was shaved off per. Lucha Libre traditions. The feud with Diana La Cazadora gave La Amapola enough Momentum to capture the CMLL World Women's Championship a few months later.

Diana La Cazadora stopped working for CMLL at some point during 2008, instead she occasionally worked on the Mexican Independent circuit, including working one of the early shows for Perros del Mal Producciones on December 16, 2008.

== Personal life and death ==
Gutiérrez lived in Monterrey, Nuevo León. On August 8, 2026, she died following complications related to a lung infection. Gutiérrez was 48.

== Championships and accomplishments ==
- Lucha Libre Femenil
  - LLF Junior Championship (1 time)
  - LLF Tag Team Championship (1 time) - with Nikki Roxx
- Mexican independent circuit:
  - Monterrey Woman's Championship (1 time)

=== Luchas de Apuestas record ===
Winner (wager)	Loser (wager)	Location	Event	Date	Notes
La Amapola (hair)	Diana La Cazadora (hair)	Mexico City, Mexico	Live event	June 17, 2007	
