= La Amapola =

Mexican wrestler, or Luchadora (born 1976)

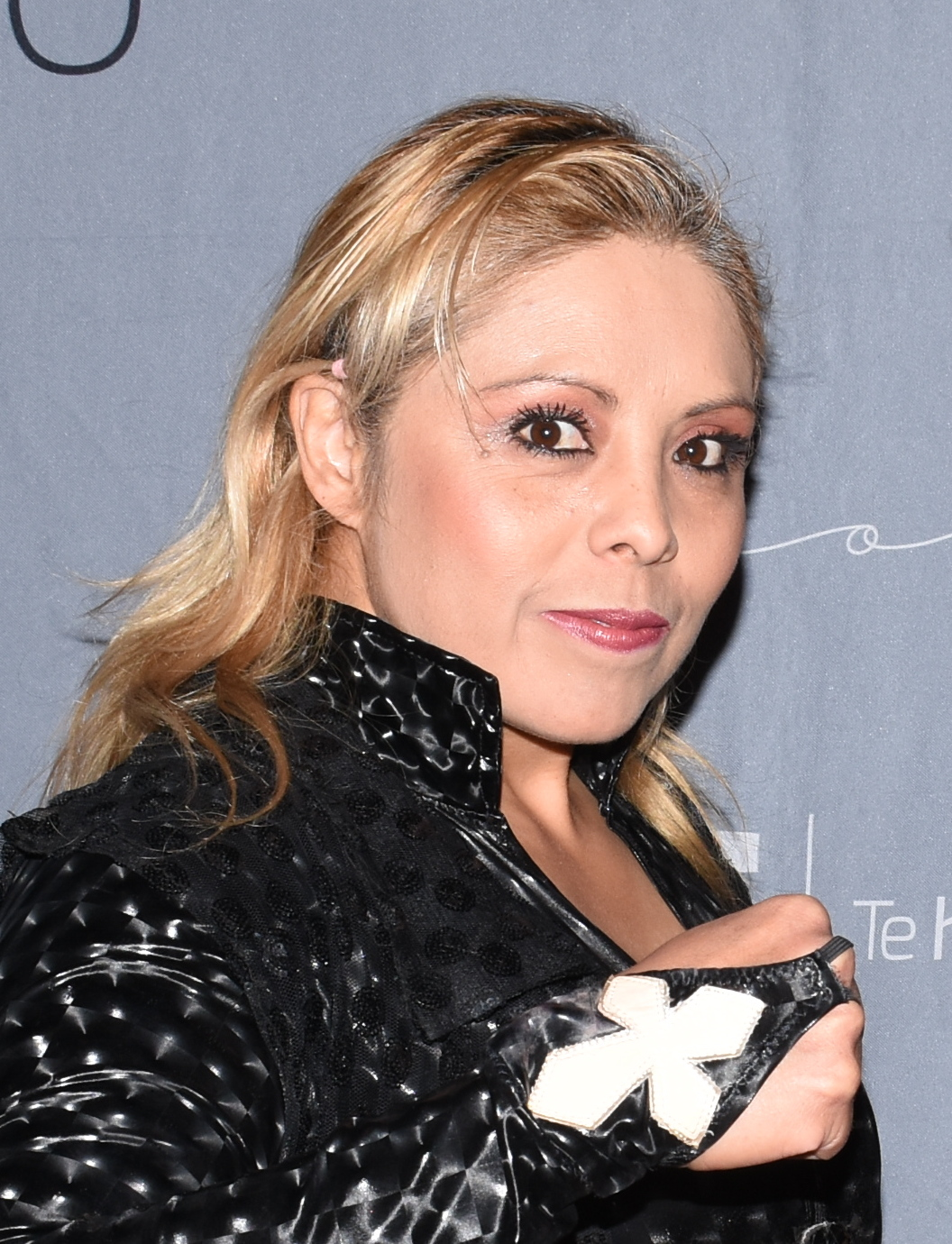
- La Amapola in 2017.

Personal information
- Born: Guadalupe Ramona Olvera; September 9, 1976 (age 49) Mexico City, Mexico

Professional wrestling career
- Ring name: La Amapola
- Billed height: 1.60 m (5 ft 3 in)
- Billed weight: 60 kg (132 lb)
- Trained by: Satánico; Insolito; Franco Colombo; Memo Diaz; Jose Luis Feliciano
- Debut: December 1997

Guadalupe Ramona Olvera is a Mexican professional wrestler, best known under the ring name La Amapola (Spanish for "The Poppy"). Olvera is best known for her work in the Mexican professional wrestling promotion Consejo Mundial de Lucha Libre (CMLL), which she has worked for all her career. She has also made appearances for various other Mexican promotions including International Wrestling Revolution Group (IWRG) where she held or holds the IWRG Intercontinental Women's Championship. At 1,442 days, she is the longest reigning CMLL World Women's Champion.

== Professional wrestling career ==
=== Consejo Mundial de Luha Libre (1998–present) ===
Olvera made her professional wrestling debut in December 1997 after training with Super Muñeco, Satánico and Adonis Salazar, whom she would later marry. She took the ring name "La Amapola", an masked wrestler. Amapola began her career working for CMLL (CMLL), which she has worked for ever since. In the late 1990s and early 2000s CMLL did not focus on their women's division, which cause La Amapola to also work for a variety of other minor Mexican promotions. She was offered a contract with CMLL's main Mexican rival AAA, but declined, opting to stay with CMLL in the hopes that they would focus on women's wrestling like they had in the mid to early 1990s. By 2005 CMLL had begun to feature more women's wrestling especially showcasing younger talent such as La Amapola and Dark Angel; the two women's storyline feud helped draw the fans attention and through that a higher profile for the women's division. On April 14, 2006 Dark Angel defeated La Amapola in a Luchas de Apuesta, or bet match, forcing La Amapola to unmask. Even after the mask loss Amapola and Dark Angel faced off many times, keeping the rivalry alive for years. In 2005 La Amapola began wearing the IWRG Intercontinental Women's Championship belt, the female championship for the Mexican promotion International Wrestling Revolution Group (IWRG). It is not clear how she won the title as the previous champion, Ayako Hamada had not wrestled in Mexico for years and no record of La Amapola winning the title during a trip to Japan exists. Initially she would just wear the belt to the ring, but in 2006 she actually defended it against Marcela and Hiroka. Some time during 2007 she stopped wearing the belt to the ring, but no record of her losing the title or a new IWRG Women's champion being crowned exists; She is technically the IWRG Women's champion, but has not defended the title nor been promoted as the champion since CMLL stopped working with the IWRG in 2007.

On June 17, 2007 La Amapola defeated Diana La Cazadora in a Luchas de Apuestas where both women put their hair on the line. After shaving La Cazadora bald La Amapola used the momentum to defeat Lady Apache for the CMLL World Women's Championship on November 16, 2007. Subsequently La Amapola has been the top Ruda (villainess or heel) of the CMLL Women's division, defending the title against such wrestlers as Luna Mágica, Dark Angel, Princess Blanca and Lady Apache and Marcela on several occasions. On June 29, 2008 La Amapola lost a four-way Luchas de Apuestas match to Lady Apache after which her hair was shaved off; the match also included Princesas Suiei and Marcela. La Amapola's most recent title defense was on June 28, 2009 at Arena Mexico where she defeated Marcela. On April 11, 2010 Amapola became the longest reigning CMLL World Women's Champion, as her title reign surpassed the previous record of 877 days set by Lady Apache's three title reigns. On October 28, 2011, Amapola lost the title to Marcela, in the thirteenth title match between the two, ending her reign at 1,442 days. On the October 12, 2012, Super Viernes show, La Amapola defeated Japanese wrestler León to win the Reina-CMLL International Championship. La Amapola then traveled to defend the title in Japan. After a successful defense against Mia Yim on November 11, she lost the title back to León on November 25. In late 2012 La Amapola became involved in a storyline feud with Estrellita, who had worked extensively as part of AAA and that Amapola considered an "outsider". Originally the focus was on the Mexican National Women's Championship that Estrellita held but over time it developed into a more personal and intense storyline between the two. On March 15, 2013 La Amapola lost a Luchas de Apuestas match to Estrellita on the under card of the 2013 Homenaje a Dos Leyendas show, which meant La Amapola was forced to have all her hair shaved off after the match. On April 20, 2014, La Amapola regained the CMLL-Reina International Championship from Syuri. On March 25, 2015, La Amapola returned to Japan, losing the CMLL-Reina International Championship to Maki Narumiya.

== Championships and accomplishments ==
- Consejo Mundial de Lucha Libre
  - CMLL World Women's Championship (1 time)
  - CMLL-Reina International Championship (2 times)
  - Copa Bobby Bonales (2018)
  - CMLL Female Wrestler of the Year (2009, 2010)
- International Wrestling Revolution Group
  - IWRG Intercontinental Women's Championship (1 time)

== Luchas de Apuestas record ==
Winner (wager)	Loser (wager)	Location	Event	Date	Notes
Dark Angel (hair)	La Amapola (mask)	Mexico City	Live event	April 14, 2006	
La Amapola (hair)	Diana La Cazadora (hair)	Mexico City	Live event	June 17, 2007	
Lady Apache (hair)	La Amapola (hair)	Mexico City	Sin Piedad	August 29, 2008	(Note: La Amapola and Lady Apache lost a Relevos suicida match against Princesa Sujei and Marcela and were forced to face each other.)
Estrellita (hair)	La Amapola (hair)	Mexico City	Homenaje a Dos Leyendas	March 15, 2013	
La Amapola (hair)	Kaho Kobayashi (hair)	Mexico City	Juicio Final	May 31, 2019	
