= 1979 in professional wrestling =

1979 in professional wrestling describes the year's events in the world of professional wrestling.

== List of notable promotions ==
Only one promotion held notable shows in 1979.

Promotion Name	Abbreviation
All Japan Women's Pro-Wrestling	AJW
All Japan Pro Wrestling	AJPW
Empresa Mexicana de Lucha Libre	EMLL
Continental Wrestling Association	CWA
Maple Leaf Wrestling	MLW
National Wrestling Alliance	NWA

== Calendar of notable shows ==
Date	Promotion(s)	Event	Location	Main Event
January 28	UWA	4th Anniversary Show	Naucalpan	Dr. Wagner beat Angel Blanco in a "Lucha de Apuestas" "Mask vs. Hair" match
February 27	AJW	All Japan Women's at Nippon Budokan	Tokyo	Jackie Sato defeated Maki Ueda in a battle between former partners where the loser must retire.
March 25	MLW	AWA/WWF Title Unification	Toronto, Ontario	WWF World Heavyweight Champion Bob Backlund fought AWA World Heavyweight Champion Nick Bockwinkel to a double count-out
May 18	CWA	Night of Champions	Knoxville, Tennessee	Harley Race (c) defeated Ron Fuller to retain the NWA World Heavyweight Championship
April 6	AJPW	Champion Carnival	Tokyo, Japan	Abdullah the Butcher defeated Jumbo Tsuruta
April 21	EMLL	23. Aniversario de Arena México	Mexico City, Mexico	Alfonso Dantés defeated Pak Choo (c) in a singles match for the NWA World Light Heavyweight Championship
June 7	NJPW	MSG League	Tokyo, Japan	Antonio Inoki defeated Stan Hansen
July 8	NWA	Battle of the Nature Boys	Greensboro, North Carolina	NWA United States Champion Ric Flair defeated Buddy Rogers
September 21	EMLL	EMLL 46th Anniversary Show	Mexico City, Mexico	Gran Cochisse defeated Américo Rocca in a Lucha de Apuestas hair vs. hair match
December 7	EMLL	Juico Final	Mexico City, Mexico	El Faraón and Águila India defeated Sangre Chicana and Tony Salazar in a Lucha de Apuestas, hair vs hair match
(c) – denotes defending champion(s)

== Notable events ==
- In March, the World Wide Wrestling Federation (WWWF) was renamed to World Wrestling Federation (WWF).
- On March 6 at a taping for WWWF Championship Wrestling, The Valiant Brothers beat Tony Garea and Larry Zbyszko to become the new WWWF Tag Team Championship.
- June 6 - Verne Gagne and Butcher Vachon beat Pat Patterson and Ray Stevens to become the AWA Tag Team Champions.
- On October 22 at New York's Madison Square Garden Ivan Putski and Tito Santana beat The Valiant Brothers to win the WWF Tag Team Championship.

== Accomplishments and tournaments ==
=== AJW ===
Accomplishment	Winner	Date won	Notes
Rookie of the Year Decision Tournament	Ayumi Hori (Jumbo Hori)		

=== JCP ===
Accomplishment	Winner	Date won	Notes
NWA United States Championship Tournament	Jimmy Snuka	September 1	

== Awards and honors ==
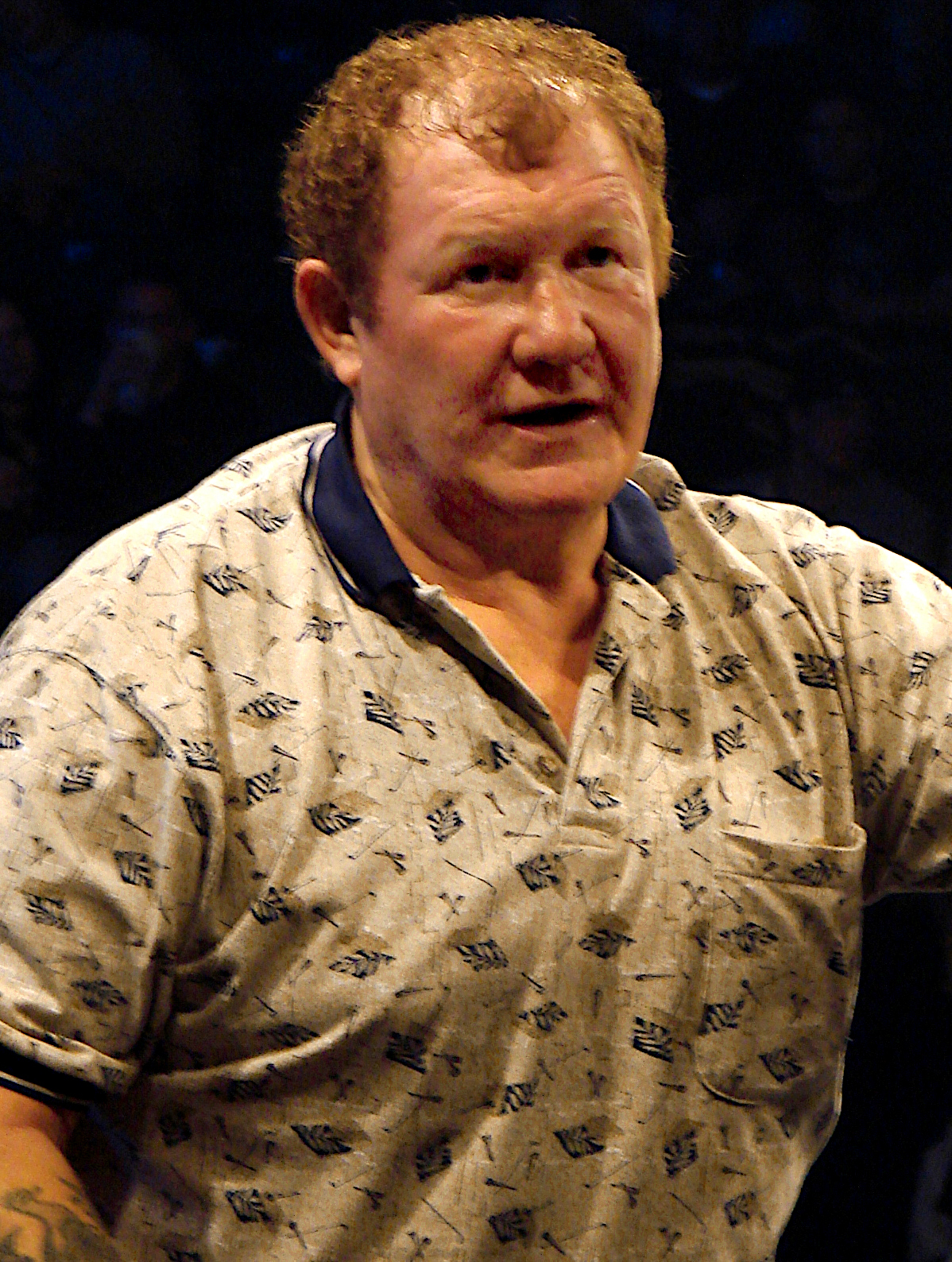
1979 PWI Wrestler of the Year, Harley Race

=== Pro Wrestling Illustrated ===
Category	Winner
PWI Wrestler of the Year	Harley Race
PWI Tag Team of the Year	Ivan Putski and Tito Santana
PWI Match of the Year	Harley Race vs. Dusty Rhodes
PWI Most Popular Wrestler of the Year	Dusty Rhodes
PWI Most Hated Wrestler of the Year	Greg Valentine
PWI Most Improved Wrestler of the Year	Tommy Rich
PWI Most Inspirational Wrestler of the Year	Chief Jay Strongbow
PWI Rookie of the Year	Sweet Brown Sugar
PWI Manager of the Year	Arnold Skaaland

== Championship changes ==
=== EMLL ===
NWA World Light Heavyweight Championship
incoming champion – Pak Choo
Date	Winner	Event/Show	Note(s)
April 30	Alfonso Dantés	EMLL show	

NWA World Middleweight Championship
Incoming champion – Tony Salazar
Date	Winner	Event/Show	Note(s)
February 3	Ringo Mendoza	EMLL show	
September 9	Satoru Sayama	EMLL show	

NWA World Welterweight Championship
Incoming champion – Mano Negra
Date	Winner	Event/Show	Note(s)
April 20	Americo Rocca	EMLL show	

Mexican National Heavyweight Championship
Incoming champion – TNT
Date	Winner	Event/Show	Note(s)
February 4	Gran Markus	EMLL show	
December 23	El Halcon	EMLL show	

Mexican National Middleweight Championship
Incoming champion – Sangre Chicana
Date	Winner	Event/Show	Note(s)
March	Vacant	EMLL show	
June 8	Cachorro Mendoza	EMLL show	
October 19	El Satanico	EMLL show	

Mexican National Lightweight Championship
Incoming champion – Tailsman
Date	Winner	Event/Show	Note(s)
April 8	Rodolfo Ruiz	EMLL show	

Mexican National Light Heavyweight Championship
Incoming champion – Dos Caras
Date	Winner	Event/Show	Note(s)
April 8	Astro Rey	EMLL show	
November 11	Dr. Wagner	EMLL show	
November 30	Enrique Vera	EMLL show	

Mexican National Welterweight Championship
Incoming champion – Americo Rocca
Date	Winner	Event/Show	Note(s)
April 18	Lizmark	Live event	

Mexican National Women's Championship
Incoming champion – Uncertain
No title changes

=== NWA ===
NWA Worlds Heavyweight Championship
Incoming champion – Harley Race
Date	Winner	Event/Show	Note(s)
August 21	Dusty Rhodes	House show	
August 26	Harley Race	House show	
October 31	Giant Baba	House show	
November 7	Harley Race	House show	

== Births ==
- January 17 - Chase Stevens
- February 21 – Carly Colón
- March 4 – Sarah Stock
- March 6 – David Flair
- March 9 – Melina
- March 12 – Nidia Guenard
- March 17 – Samoa Joe
- March 23 - Ray Gordy
- March 28 - Goldy Locks
- April 19 – Nicole Raczynski
- April 25 - Belladonna (d. 2019)
- April 29 - Vladimir Kozlov
- May 3 - Monsta Mack
- May 4 - Ryan Shamrock
- May 11 - Air Paris
- May 26 – Ashley Massaro (d. 2019)
- May 29 – Brian Kendrick
- June 19 - Billy Reil (d. 2024)
- June 25 - Hirooki Goto
- July 18 – Joey Mercury
- July 19 – Pólvora
- July 20 - Adam Rose
- July 23
  - Peter Rosenberg
  - Perro Aguayo Jr. (d. 2015)
- July 27 – Shannon Moore
- July 31 - R. J. Brewer
- August 9 - Silas Young
- August 10 - Kongo Kong
- August 31 – Mickie James
- September 5 - Slyck Wagner Brown
- September 6
  - Low Ki
  - Saburo Inematsu
- September 26 - Naomichi Marufuji
- October 1 – Curtis Axel
- October 3 – John Morrison
- October 8 – Paul Burchill
- October 14 – Stacy Keibler
- October 19 – Mari Apache
- October 25 – Rosa Mendes
- October 27 – Bobby Fish
- November 2 – Cliff Compton
- November 5 - Jackson Andrews
- November 7 - Joey Ryan
- November 12 - Matt Cappotelli (d. 2018)
- November 17
  - Katsuyori Shibata
  - Meiko Satomura
- November 21 - Ryota Hama
- December 3 – Seth Petruzelli
- December 10 - Matt Bentley
- December 15 – Eric Young
- December 16:
  - Luke Harper/Brodie Lee (d. 2020)
  - Murat Bosporus
- December 18 - Eric Escobar
- December 24 – Chris Hero
- December 26 - Hiroshi Nagao
- December 29 - Justin Roberts

== Debuts ==
- Uncertain debut date

- Barry Windham
- Jim Duggan
- Wendi Richter
- Tom Prichard

- March 5 - Shiro Koshinaka
- September 9 - Martha Villalobos
- September 17 - Apollo Sugawara

== Deaths ==
- April 26 – Fuzzy Cupid, 50
- June 30 – Chris Taylor, 29
- July 14 - Billy McCrary, 32
- July 22 - Tony Galento, 69
- October 11 - Lou Bastien, 63

== Retirements ==
- Spiros Arion (1961 - 1979)
- Boris Malenko (1955 - 1979)
