= EMLL 51st Anniversary Show =

Mexican Professional wrestling show

- Poster for the event showing all scheduled matches
- Promotion: Empresa Mexicana de Lucha Libre
- Date: September 21, 1984
- City: Mexico City, Mexico
- Venue: Arena México
- Attendance: 18,000

Event chronology
| ← Previous; 28. Aniversario de Arena México | Next → Juicio Final |

EMLL Anniversary Show chronology
| ← Previous; 50th Anniversary | Next → 52nd Anniversary |

The EMLL 51st Anniversary Show (Spanish: 51. Aniversario de EMLL) was a professional wrestling major show event produced by Empresa Mexicana de Lucha Libre (EMLL) that took place on September 21, 1984, in Arena México, Mexico City, Mexico. The event commemorated the 51st anniversary of CMLL, which would become the oldest professional wrestling promotion in the world. The Anniversary show is EMLL's biggest show of the year, their Super Bowl event. The EMLL Anniversary Show series is the longest-running annual professional wrestling show, starting in 1934.

The main event of the show was a Lucha de Apuestas ("Bet Match") contested under best two-out-of-three falls rules between Atlantis and Talisman where the loser would be forced to unmask after the match in front of everyone in the arena. After his loss, Talisman unmasked and reveal his real name, Arturo Beristain Ramírez. In the semi-main event, another Lucha de Apuestas match, Sangre Chicana defeated MS-1 by count-out, and as a result, MS-1 was shaved bald. In the fourth match of the night El Canek successfully defended the UWA World Heavyweight Championship against Cien Caras. Three Six-man tag team matches rounded out the card.

== Production ==
=== Background ===
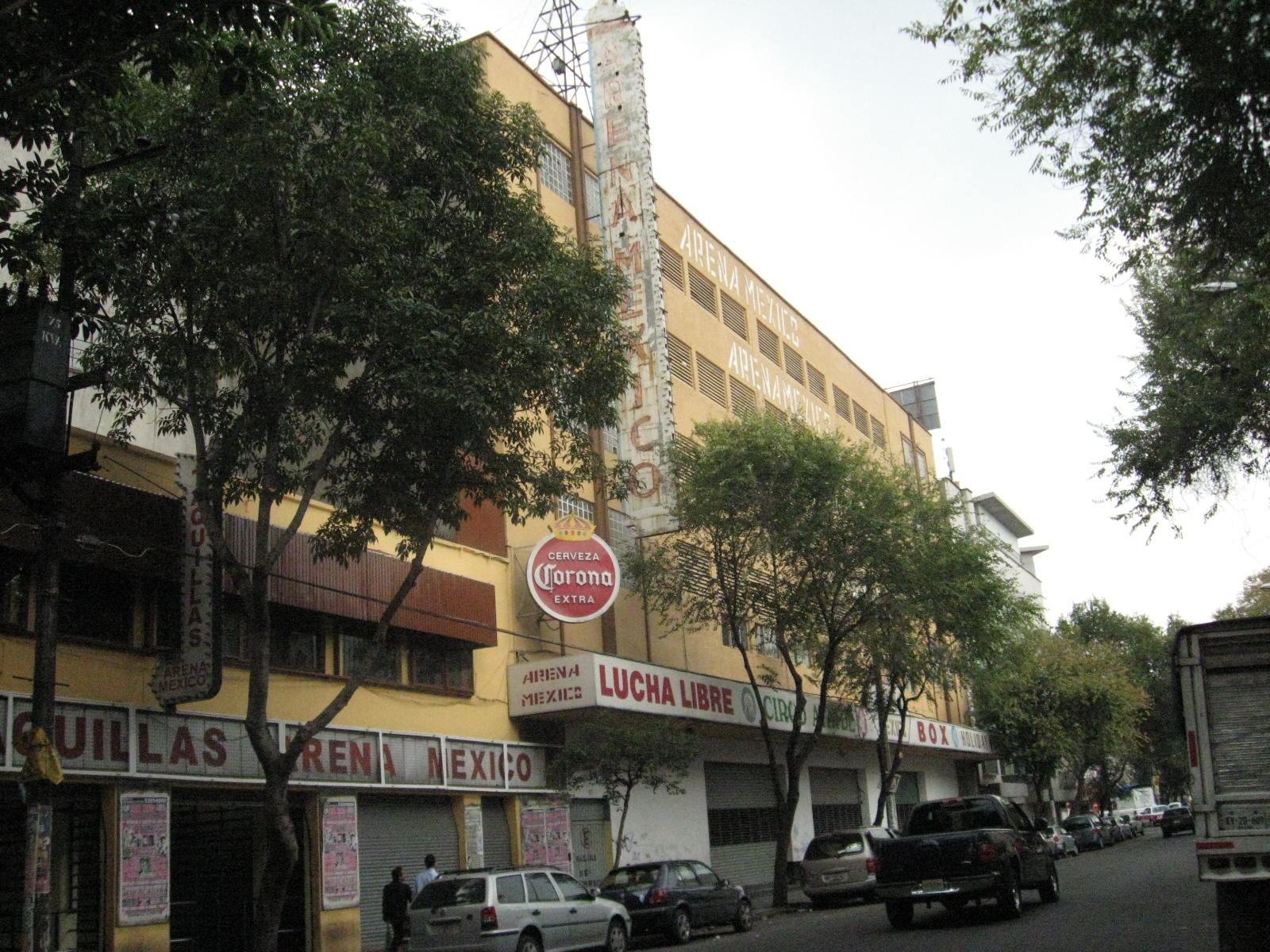
Arena México, CMLL's main venue and location of the Anniversary Show

The Mexican Lucha libre (professional wrestling) company Consejo Mundial de Lucha Libre (CMLL) started out under the name Empresa Mexicana de Lucha Libre ("Mexican Wrestling Company"; EMLL), founded by Salvador Lutteroth in 1933. Lutteroth, inspired by professional wrestling shows he had attended in Texas, decided to become a wrestling promoter and held his first show on September 21, 1933, marking what would be the beginning of organized professional wrestling in Mexico. Lutteroth would later become known as "the father of Lucha Libre" . A year later EMLL held the EMLL 1st Anniversary Show, starting the annual tradition of the Consejo Mundial de Lucha Libre Anniversary Shows that have been held each year ever since, most commonly in September.

Over the years the anniversary show would become the biggest show of the year for CMLL, akin to the Super Bowl for the National Football League (NFL) or WWE's WrestleMania event. The first anniversary show was held in Arena Modelo, which Lutteroth had bought after starting EMLL. In 1942–43 Lutteroth financed the construction of Arena Coliseo, which opened in April 1943. The EMLL 10th Anniversary Show was the first of the anniversary shows to be held in Arena Coliseo. In 1956 Lutteroth had Arena México built in the location of the original Arena Modelo, making Arena México the main venue of EMLL from that point on. Starting with the EMLL 23rd Anniversary Show, all anniversary shows except for the EMLL 46th Anniversary Show have been held in the arena that would become known as "The Cathedral of Lucha Libre". On occasion EMLL held more than one show labelled as their "Anniversary" show, such as two 33rd Anniversary Shows in 1966. Over time the anniversary show series became the oldest, longest-running annual professional wrestling show. In comparison, WWE's WrestleMania is only the fourth oldest still promoted show (CMLL's Arena Coliseo Anniversary Show and Arena México anniversary shows being second and third). Traditionally CMLL holds their major events on Friday Nights, replacing their regularly scheduled Super Viernes show.

=== Storylines ===
The event featured six professional wrestling matches with different wrestlers involved in pre-existing scripted feuds, plots and storylines. Wrestlers were portrayed as either heels (referred to as rudos in Mexico, those that portray the "bad guys") or faces (técnicos in Mexico, the "good guy" characters) as they followed a series of tension-building events, which culminated in a wrestling match or series of matches.

== Event ==
In the semi-main event of the night, Sangre Chicana faced and defeated Los Infernales team member MS-1 in a hair vs. hair, Lucha de Apuestas match, forcing MS-1 to be shaved bald as a result. The main event was the culmination of a long running storyline between the two enmascarados ("Masked Wrestlers") Atlantis and Talisman that started not long after Atlantis joined EMLL in 1984. Atlantis, only in his second year of wrestling at this point in time was targeted by the veteran rudo Talisman who wanted to show Atlantis his "proper place" in the hierarchy of EMLL. The two wrestlers agreed to both put their masks on the line for the 51st Anniversary show, in what was Atlantis first ever Lucha de Apuesta or "Bet Match". In Lucha Libre the Luchas de Apuestas matches are more significant than championship matches and winning the mask of an opponent usually indicates that the promotion is planning on "pushing" that wrestler up to a higher profiled position in the company. The rudo Talisman cheated his way to victory in the first fall, putting Atlantis in a position where he would have to win two straight falls to win the match. With a performance that had the crowd at Arena México solidly behind him Atlantis managed to pin Talisman in both the second and third fall. After the match Talisman was forced to unmask and reveal that his real name was Arturo Beristain.

== Aftermath ==
A few years after losing the Talisman mask Arturo Beristain would adopt a new enmascarado ("Masked") ring character, using the name El Hijo del Gladiador ("Son of El Gladiador"), a storyline relationship as he was not a blood relative of the deceased wrestler El Gladiador.

== Results ==
| No. | Results | Stipulations |
|---|---|---|
| 1 | Estrella Blanca Jr., El Solar, and Águila Solitaria vs. El Dandy, Negro Casas and Ari Gato Romero ended in an unknown manner | Six-man "Lucha Libre rules" tag team match |
| 2 | Rayo de Jalisco Jr., Máscara Año 2000, and Tony Salazar vs. El Satanico, Coloso Colisetti, and Pirata Morgan ended in an unknown manner | Six-man "Lucha Libre rules" tag team match |
| 3 | El Hijo del Santo, Samuray Shiro, and El Acertijo vs. Fuerza Guerrera, Lemus II, and El Enfermero Jr. ended in an unknown manner | Six-man "Lucha Libre rules" tag team match |
| 4 | El Canek (c) defeated Cien Caras | Best two-out-of-three falls match for the UWA World Heavyweight Championship |
| 5 | Sangre Chicana defeated MS-1 by count out | Best two-out-of-three falls Lucha de Apuestas hair vs. hair match |
| 6 | Atlantis defeated Talisman | Best two-out-of-three falls Lucha de Apuestas mask vs. mask match |
(c) / – the champion(s) heading into the match
