= List of CMLL World Middleweight Champions =

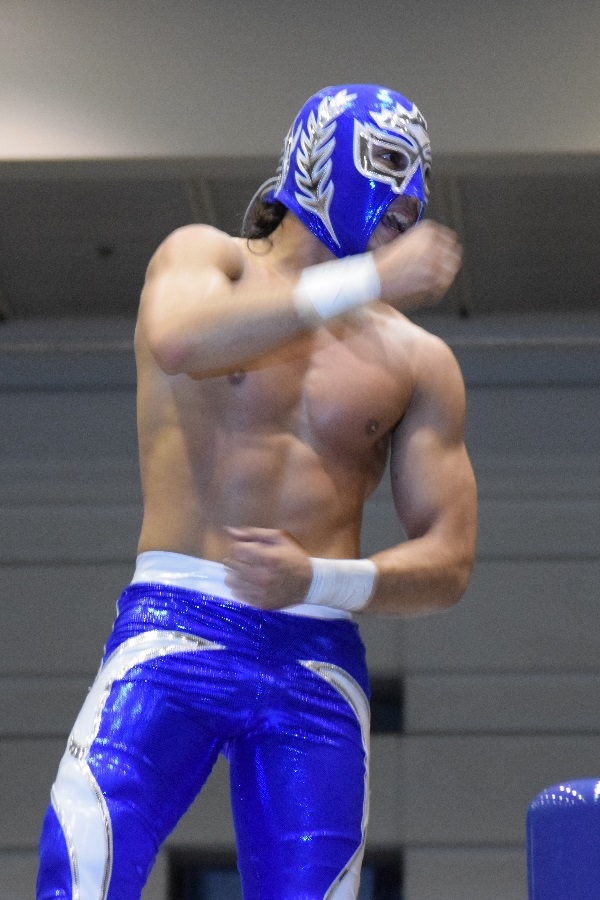
20th CMLL World Middleweight Champion, Soberano Jr.

The CMLL World Middleweight Championship (Campeonato Mundial Peso Medio de CMLL in Spanish) is a professional wrestling world championship promoted by the Mexican Lucha Libre wrestling-based promotion Consejo Mundial de Lucha Libre (CMLL). As it is a professional wrestling championship, it is not won legitimately; it is instead won via a scripted ending to a match or awarded to a wrestler because of a storyline. The official definition of the middleweight weight class in Mexico is between 82 kg (181 lb) and 87 kg (192 lb), but is not always strictly enforced. (Note: The most recent case of this is Mephisto holding the CMLL World Welterweight Championship, a belt with a 78 kg (172 lb) upper limit, despite weighing 90 kg (200 lb).) Because Lucha Libre emphasizes the lower weight classes, this division is considered more important than the normally more prestigious heavyweight division of a promotion. All title matches take place under two out of three falls rules.

Blue Panther was officially recognized as the first champion in 1991, after winning a 16-man tournament. The championship's history was interrupted in 1992 when Blue Panther left CMLL to work for rival promotion Asistencia Asesoría y Administración (AAA). El Dandy defeated Negro Casas in a singles match to decide the new champion. El Dandy has had the most reigns as champion, with three; he also has the shortest reign, at 63 days. Dragón Rojo Jr.'s single championship reign is the longest reign, at 1,954 days. Overall, there have been 17 champions across 22 reigns, with 2 vacancies.

== Title history ==
Key
| No. | Overall reign number |
| Reign | Reign number for the specific champion |
| Days | Number of days held |
| N/A | Unknown information |
| + | Current reign is changing daily |

| No. | Champion | Championship change | | | Reign statistics | | Notes | Ref. |
| No. | Champion | Date | Event | Location | Reign | Days | Notes | Ref. |
|---|---|---|---|---|---|---|---|---|
Consejo Mundial de Lucha Libre (CMLL)
| 1 | Blue Panther | December 18, 1991 | Wrestling In Acapulco | Acapulco, Guerrero | 1 | 190 | Defeated El Satánico in a tournament final to become the inaugural champion. | |
| — | Vacated | June 19, 1992 | — | — | — | — | Championship vacated when Blue Panther left CMLL for Asistencia Asesoría y Administración | |
| 2 | El Dandy | July 3, 1992 | CMLL on Televisa | Mexico City, D.F. | 1 | 63 | This was a tournament final two out of three falls match, where El Dandy defeated Negro Casas. | |
| 3 | Bestia Salvaje | September 4, 1992 | CMLL on Televisa | Mexico City, D.F. | 1 | 103 | This was a two out of three falls match. | |
| 4 | El Dandy | December 16, 1992 | Wrestling In Naucalpan | Naucalpan, Mexico | 2 | 147 | This was a two out of three falls match. | |
| 5 | Emilio Charles Jr. | May 12, 1993 | Wrestling In Acapulco | Acapulco, Guerrero | 1 | 146 | This was a two out of three falls match. | |
| 6 | El Dandy | October 5, 1993 | CMLL Martes De Coliseo | Mexico City, D.F. | 3 | 140 | This was a two out of three falls match. | |
| 7 | Javier Llanes | February 22, 1994 | CMLL Martes De Coliseo | Mexico City, D.F. | 1 | 201 | This was a two out of three falls match. | |
| 8 | Apolo Dantés | September 11, 1994 | CMLL Domingos De Coliseo | Mexico City, D.F. | 1 | 77 | This was a two out of three falls match. | |
| 9 | El Satánico | November 27, 1994 | Live event | Guadalajara, Jalisco | 1 | 1,561 | | |
| 10 | Ringo Mendoza | March 7, 1999 | CMLL Domingos De Coliseo | Mexico City, D.F. | 1 | 742 | This was a two out of three falls match. | |
| 11 | Emilio Charles, Jr. | March 18, 2001 | CMLL Domingos De Coliseo | Mexico City, D.F. | 2 | 1,135 | This was a two out of three falls match. | |
| 12 | Negro Casas | April 26, 2004 | CMLL Lunes Arena Puebla | Puebla de Zaragoza | 1 | 874 | This was a two out of three falls match. | |
| 13 | Averno | September 17, 2006 | CMLL Domingos De Coliseo | Mexico City, D.F. | 1 | 1,038 | This was a two out of three falls match. | |
| 14 | El Hijo del Fantasma | July 21, 2009 | CMLL Martes Arena Mexico | Mexico City, D.F. | 1 | 208 | This was a two out of three falls match. | |
| 15 | Negro Casas | February 14, 2010 | CMLL Domingos Arena Mexico | Mexico City, D.F. | 2 | 78 | This was a two out of three falls match. | |
| 16 | Jushin Thunder Liger | May 3, 2010 | NJPW Wrestling Dontaku | Fukuoka, Japan | 1 | 564 | | |
| 17 | Dragón Rojo Jr. | November 18, 2011 | CMLL on Televisa | Mexico City, D.F. | 1 | 1,954 | This was a two out of three falls match. | |
| 18 | Ángel de Oro | March 25, 2017 | CMLL Sabados De Coliseo | Mexico City, D.F. | 1 | 300 | This was a two out of three falls match. | |
| 19 | El Cuatrero | January 19, 2018 | NJPW Presents CMLL Fantastica Mania - Nught 6 | Tokyo, Japan | 1 | 1,300 | | |
| — | Vacated | August 11, 2021 | — | — | — | — | Title vacated when Cuatrero left CMLL. | |
| 20 | Soberano, Jr. | December 10, 2021 | CMLL Super Viernes | Mexico City, D.F. | 1 | 111 | Defeated Templato in.a tournament final for the vacant title. | |
| 21 | Dragón Rojo Jr. | April 2, 2022 | CMLL Super Viernes | Mexico City, D.F. | 2 | 405 | | |
| 22 | Templario | May 12, 2023 | CMLL Super Viernes | Mexico City, D.F. | 1 | 1,281+ | | |

== Combined reigns ==
As of October 8, 2026.

| † | Indicates the current champion |

| Rank | Wrestler | No. of reigns | Combined days |
|---|---|---|---|
| 1 | Dragón Rojo Jr. | 2 | 2,359 |
| 2 | El Satánico | 1 | 1,561 |
| 3 | El Cuatrero | 1 | 1,300 |
| 4 | Templario † | 1 | 1,281+ |
| 5 | Emilio Charles, Jr. | 2 | 1,281 |
| 6 | Averno | 1 | 1,038 |
| 7 | Negro Casas | 1 | 879 |
| 8 | Ringo Mendoza | 1 | 742 |
| 9 | Jushin Thunder Liger | 1 | 564 |
| 10 | El Dandy | 3 | 350 |
| 11 | Ángel de Oro | 1 | 300 |
| 12 | El Hijo del Fantasma | 1 | 208 |
| 13 | Javier Llanes | 1 | 201 |
| 14 | Blue Panther | 1 | 184 |
| 15 | Soberano Jr. | 1 | 111 |
| 16 | Bestia Salvaje | 1 | 103 |
| 17 | Apolo Dantés | 1 | 77 |
