= Nosferatu (wrestler) =

Mexican professional wrestler

Personal information
- Born: Francisco Javier Prado Escobar; September 17, 1979 (age 46) Guadalajara, Jalisco, Mexico
- Died: July 2025 Mexico

Professional wrestling career
- Ring name(s): Chamaco Valaguez Jr. Nosferatu
- Billed height: 1.85 m (6 ft 1 in)
- Billed weight: 104 kg (229 lb)
- Trained by: El Satánico; Los Hermanos Escobedo; Chamaco Valaguez; Tony Salazar; El Hijo del Gladiador
- Debut: November 11, 2000

Nosferatu (September 17, 1979 – 26 July 2025) was a Mexican professional wrestler, working for the Mexican promotion Consejo Mundial de Lucha Libre (CMLL) portraying a rudo ("bad guy") character. Nosferatu's real name is not a matter of public record; although he previously worked without a mask, using the ring name Chamaco Valaguez Jr., it has not been verified that is his real name. Mexican wrestlers often try to keep their private lives secret from the wrestling fans.

== Professional wrestling career ==
The wrestler currently known as Nosferatu is the son of retired professional wrestler Chamaco Valaguez and the brother of active wrestler Apolo Valaguez. He made his debut in 2000 working under the ring name Chamaco Valaguez Jr. as an homage to his father. Initially he worked on the Mexican independent circuit and occasionally for Consejo Mundial de Lucha Libre (CMLL), Mexico's largest and the world's oldest professional wrestling promotion.

=== Nosferatus (2007–present) ===
In early 2007 CMLL decided to give Valaguez Jr. a new image and ring name, repackaging him as an enmascarado (masked wrestler) called Nosferatu. He would wear primarily black clothes and mask with various hellish imagery to enforce the rudo character he was portraying. As Nosferatu he joined Los Infernales ("The Infernals") a team led by veteran rudo El Satánico who served both as a mentor and a trainer to the team members. As a part of Los Infernales he would regularly team with Euforia (who had also been given a new ring character) and later on when Satánico's in-ring career slowed down worked alongside Virus as well. One of his first opportunities under the new name came when he entered the 2007 Reyes del Aire ("Kings of the Air") tournament, but he was the first person eliminated from the match. In June 2008 Los Nuevo Infernales (Nosferatu and Euforia) entered a tournament for the vacant CMLL Arena Coliseo Tag Team Championship, defeating Los Rayos Tapatio, Metalik and Métalico, and Ángel Azteca Jr. and Máscara Purpura to earn a spot in the finals. The final match saw Flash and Stuka Jr. defeat Los Nuevo Infernales to win the Arena Coliseo Tag Team Championship. Following their loss Los Nuevo Infernales began a long running rivalry with Flash and Stuka Jr., which saw Nosferatu and Euforia unsuccessfully challenge for the Arena Coliseo Tag Team Championship on December 14, 2008. Nosferatu and Euforia defeated the champions in a non-title match at CMLL's La Hora Cero Pay-per-view on January 11, 2009. By mid-2009 Nosferatu and Euforia were teaming together less, and Nosferatu was replaced by Skandalo in a trios match that saw Eurforia, Virus and Skandalo defeat Flash, Stuka Jr. and Metalico on the undercard of the 2009 Infierno en el Ring event.

On November 18, 2009, CMLL presented a new rudo group that had formed called Los Cancerberos del Infierno ("The Infernal Cerberus"), a continuation of Los Infernales as it was led by Virus and also included Euforia, but Nosferatu was not included in the group. While not part of Los Cancerberos Nosferatu was teamed up with Euforia for a tournament to determine the next challengers for the CMLL Arena Coloseo Tag Team Champions. The former Infernales defeated Molotov and Sensei in the first round and La Fuerza Rapida ("Speed Force"; Pegasso and Rey Cometa) in the second round. They lost in the semi-final round to Los Ángeles Celestiales (Ángel de Oro and Ángel de Plata). In late 2010 he teamed up with Euforia and Los Cancerbero member Pólvora for a tournament to find the next challengers for the Mexican National Trios Championship. The trio defeated Fuego, Molotov and Rey Cometa in the opening round, but lost to El Sagrado, Metal Blanco and Palacio Negro in the semi-finals of the tournament. Nosferatu made very few CMLL appearances during 2011, and did not return as a regular competitor until around July 2012.

== Championships and accomplishments ==
Comisión de Box y Lucha Libre Morelos

  - Morelos State Tag Team Championship (1 time) – with Rafaga Moreno Jr.

== Luchas de Apuestas record ==
Winner (wager)	Loser (wager)	Location	Event	Date	Notes
Chamaco Valaguez Jr. (hair)	Bestia Salvaje (hair)	N/A	Live event	N/A	
Chamaco Valaguez Jr. (hair)	Bestia Salvaje (hair)	N/A	Live event	N/A	
Chamaco Valaguez Jr. (hair)	Jupiter (hair)	Cuernavaca, Morelos	Live event	August 15, 2004	
