= Chamaco Valaguez =

Mexican professional wrestler

Personal information
- Born: Javier Prado Valaguez; February 19, 1957 (age 69) Cuernavaca, Morelos, Mexico

Professional wrestling career
- Ring name(s): Chamaco Valaguez; Platino
- Billed height: 1.71 m (5 ft 7 1/2 in)
- Billed weight: 86 kg (190 lb)
- Trained by: Elfego Silva; Rafael Salamanca
- Debut: February 8, 1976
- Retired: May 20, 2022

Javier Prado Valaguez (born February 19, 1957) is a Mexican retired professional wrestler, best known under the ring name Chamaco Valaguez (Spanish for "Kid Valaguez"). Valaquez also wrestle as the masked character Platino, the original version until 1991 when someone else took over the character. Valaquez' two sons are also professional wrestlers working under the names Apolo Valaquez and Nosferatu. In early 2019 he was appointed president of the boxing and professional wrestling commission in Cuernavaca.

== Professional wrestling career ==
Valaguez made his professional wrestling debut on February 8, 1976, wrestling as Chamaco Valaguez. By 1980 Valaguez became a regular for Empresa Mexicana de Lucha Libre (EMLL), Mexico's largest and oldest professional wrestling promotion. On June 12, 1980, Valaguez won his first championship, defeating Rodolfo Ruiz to win the Mexican National Lightweight Championship. Valaguez held the Lightweight title for close to 600 days, making numerous title defenses along the way. The title run really helped establish Valaquez as a promising wrestler, during his title run Valaguez used an elevated cradle neckbreaker move so frequently that it was named after him, being known as La Valagueza from then on. Valaguez vacated the Lightweight title when he moved up to the Welterweight division, which in Mexico is between 70 kg (150 lb) and 78 kg (172 lb) On August 4, 1983, Valaquez defeated Mocho Cota to win the Mexican National Welterweight Championship, a title he held for 357 days in total. Valaguez defended the title on numerous occasions over the following year, until vacating it on July 26, 1984, when he won the NWA World Welterweight Championship from Mocho Cota. Valaguez' run with the NWA Welterweight title was as successful as his run with the Mexican National Welterweight title, holding it and defending it for 359 days in total. On July 20, 1985 Valaguez moved from the Welterweight division to the middleweight division (between 82 kg (181 lb) and 87 kg (192 lb)) when he won the NWA World Middleweight Championship from La Fiera. After winning the Middleweight title he vacated the Welterweight championship, making it the second title in a row he vacated because he won a higher ranking title. After 302 days with the title Valaguez was defeated by Gran Cochisse and lost the championship. In 1991 Valaguez adopted an enmascarado (masked) ring character called Platino, part of a trio called Los Metalicos, along with Oro and Bronce. Valaquez only played the part of Platino for under year before being replaced by a new Platino. Valaguez' schedule reduced greatly through the 1990s, but he remained active until at least 2005.

In recent years Valaguez' two sons have begun wrestling; one of his sons initially wrestled as "Chamaco Valaguez, Jr." but in 2007 he changed his ring character to the enmascarado Nosferatu and is now a part of Los Infernales. Valaguez' other son wrestles as Apolo Valaguez.

== Post-retirement ==
In early 2019 Valaguez was appointed the president of the Cuernavaca, Morelos professional wrestling and boxing commission, overseeing and enforcing the rules for all wrestling and boxing shows in the city.

== Championships and accomplishments ==
- Empresa Mexicana de Lucha Libre
  - Mexican National Lightweight Championship (1 time)
  - Mexican National Welterweight Championship (1 time)
  - NWA World Middleweight Championship (1 time)
  - NWA World Welterweight Championship (1 time)
- Regional championships
  - Morelos Welterweight Championship (1 time)

== Luchas de Apuestas record ==
Winner (wager)	Loser (wager)	Location	Event	Date	Notes
Jaque Mate (hair)	Chamaco Valaguez (hair)	N/A	Live event	N/A	
Mocho Cota (hair)	Chamaco Valaguez (hair)	Cuernavaca, Morelos	Live event	N/A	
Chamaco Valaguez (hair)	Gran Cochisse (hair)	Mexico City	Live event	July 1981	
Chamaco Valaguez (hair)	Mocho Cota (hair)	Cuernavaca, Morelos	Live event	July 29, 1982	
Chamaco Valaguez (hair)	Jerry Estrada (hair)	Mexico City	Live event	January 23, 1983	
Chamaco Valaguez (hair)	Africano Jr. (hair)	Puebla, Puebla	Live event	July 24, 1983	
Chamaco Valaguez (hair)	Ráfaga Moreno (hair)	Cuernavaca, Morelos	Live event	July 29, 1984	
Chamaco Valaguez (hair)	Impala (hair)	Apatlaco, State of Mexico	Live event	August 18, 1984	
Mocho Cota (hair)	Chamaco Valaguez (hair)	Mexico City	Live event	September 7, 1984	
Chamaco Valaguez (hair)	Guerrero Negro (hair)	N/A	Live event	March 1987	
Américo Rocca, Javier Llanes, Chamaco Valaguez (hair)	Los Destructores (hair) (Emilio Charles Jr., Tony Arce and Vulcano)	Mexico City	Live event	July 31, 87	
Los Rangers del Norte (I and II) (hair)	Américo Rocca and Chamaco Valaguez (hair)	N/A	Live event	1990	
Javier Cruz (hair)	Chamaco Valaguez (hair)	Cuernavaca, Morelos	Live event	August 1, 1991	
Cachorro Mendoza (hair)	Chamaco Valaguez (hair)	Mexico City	Live event	September 21, 1993	(Note: This was a four-way match that also included Javier Cruz and Américo Rocca.)
Mocho Cota (hair)	Chamaco Valaguez (hair)	Cuernavaca, Morelos	Live event	March 29, 1994	
Chamaco Valaguez (hair)	Bestia Negra I (hair)	Cuernavaca, Morelos	Live event	August 4, 2005	
