= Cachorro Mendoza =

Mexican professional wrestler

Personal information
- Born: Pedro Jacobo Contreras; October 10, 1955 (age 70) Mezcala de la Asunción, Jalisco, Mexico
- Relatives: Ringo Mendoza (brother); Indio Mendoza (brother); Freddy Mendoza (brother)

Professional wrestling career
- Ring names: Cachorro Mendoza; Chico Mendoza; Máscara Sagrada
- Billed height: 1.70 m (5 ft 7 in)
- Billed weight: 93 kg (205 lb)
- Trained by: Diablo Velazco
- Debut: July 1974
- Retired: September 2019

Pedro Jacobo Contreras (born October 10, 1955) is a retired Mexican professional wrestler best known under the ring name Cachorro Mendoza. Cachorro Mendoza means "Cub Mendoza" in English and refers to the fact that he is the youngers of the Mendoza brothers Ringo, Indio and Freddy all of whom are professional wrestlers. Over the years he's worked extensively for Empresa Mexicana de Lucha Libre (EMLL) and the Universal Wrestling Association (UWA), often teaming with his brothers, especially Ringo Mendoza. The Mendoza brothers have held the Mexican National Tag Team Championship on one occasion, and he has also held the Mexican National Middleweight Championship, the NWA World Middleweight Championship and the UWA World Middleweight Championship during his career. Cotreras briefly worked as Máscara Sagrada on the Mexican Independent circuit, using the outfit and name of the original Máscara Sagrada without permission. He retired from professional wrestling in the late 1990s but returned to the ring in 2009 to team with his brother Ringo Mendoza on a series of shows promoted by International Wrestling Revolution Group (IWRG).

== Championships and accomplishments ==
- Empresa Mexicana de Lucha Libre
  - Mexican National Middleweight Championship (1 time)
  - Mexican National Tag Team Championship (1 time) – with Ringo Mendoza
  - NWA World Middleweight Championship (1 time)
  - Copa Arena Coliseo (1994) – with Bestia Salvaje
- Universal Wrestling Association
  - UWA World Middleweight Championship (1 time)

== Luchas de Apuestas record ==
Winner (wager)	Loser (wager)	Location	Event	Date	Notes
Cachorro Mendoza (hair)	Mr. Zombie (mask)	Aguascalientes, Aguascalientes	Live event	N/A	
Cachorro Mendoza (hair)	Tauro (hair)	Mexico City	Live event	N/A	
Cachorro Mendoza (hair)	Manuel Robles (hair)	Mexico City	Live event	N/A	
Cachorro Mendoza (hair)	Antonio Cruz (hair)	N/A	Live event	N/A	
Cachorro Mendoza (hair)	Rodolfo Ruiz (hair)	N/A	Live event	N/A	
Jerry Estrada (hair)	Cachorro Mendoza (hair)	Mexico City	Live event	N/A	
La Fiera (hair)	Cachorro Mendoza (hair)	Mexico City	Live event	N/A	
Ringo and Cachorro Mendoza (hair)	Adorable Rubí and Divino Roy (hair)	Mexico City	Live event	June 22, 1979	
Cachorro Mendoza (hair)	El Satánico (hair)	Mexico City	Live event	August 28, 1979	
El Satánico (hair)	Cachorro Mendoza (hair)	Mexico City	Live event	August 29, 1980	
Cachorro Mendoza (hair)	Mocho Cota (hair)	Mexico City	EMLL 48th Anniversary Show	September 18, 1981	
Espectro Jr. (mask) and Américo Rocca (hair)	Alfil (mask) and Cachorro Mendoza (hair)	Mexico City	Live event	December 4, 1981	
Sangre Chicana and El Satánico (hair)	Ringo and Cachorro Mendoza (hair)	N/A	Live event	May 1982	
Cachorro Mendoza (hair)	El Salvaje (hair)	Mexico City	27. Aniversario de Arena México	April 22, 1983	
La Fiera and Mocho Cota (hair)	Ringo and Cachorro Mendoza (hair)	Mexico City	Live event	July 1, 1983	
Cachorro Mendoza (hair)	Jerry Estrada (hair)	Mexico City	Live event	September 25, 1983	
Cachorro Mendoza (hair)	Carlos Plata (hair)	Mexico City	Live event	October 28, 1983	
Bestia Salvaje (hair)	Cachorro Mendoza (hair)	Mexico City	Live event	May 4, 1990	
Scorpio (hair)	Cachorro Mendoza (hair)	Mexico City, Mexico	Live event	August 10, 1990	
Apolo Dantés (hair)	Cachorro Mendoza (hair)	Guadalajara, Jalisco	Live event	April 1992	
Cachorro Mendoza (hair)	Chamaco Valaguez (hair)	Mexico City	Live event	September 21, 1993	(Note: This was a four-way match that also included Javier Cruz and Américo Rocca.)
