= La Fiera =

Mexican professional wrestler (1961–2010)

Personal information
- Born: Arturo Casco Hernández; March 17, 1961 Puebla, Puebla, Mexico
- Died: September 12, 2010 (aged 49)

Professional wrestling career
- Ring name: La Fiera
- Billed height: 1.75 m (5 ft 9 in)
- Billed weight: 94 kg (207 lb)
- Trained by: Hércules Poblano
- Debut: April 1977

Arturo Casco Hernández (March 17, 1961 – September 12, 2010) was a Mexican professional wrestler, best known under the ring name La Fiera, which is Spanish for "The Wild Beast". Hernández was a second-generation wrestler, following in the footsteps of his father Hércules Poblano ("The Hercules from Puebla"). His brother wrestled as Ángel Poblano.

== Professional wrestling career ==
Fiera held the NWA World Welterweight Championship from October 23, 1981 when he defeated Lizmark for the title until July 18, 1982 when he lost the championship to Américo Rocca. He would later hold the NWA World Middleweight Championship, defeating Gran Hamada on November 18, 1984, holding it until July 20, 1985 when he lost the belt to Chamaco Valaguez.

While his career slowed down by the 1990s due to age and injuries, he experienced a small comeback of sorts in 1996 when he teamed with Dos Caras and Héctor Garza to win the CMLL World Trios Championship from Bestia Salvaje, Emilio Charles, Jr. and Sangre Chicana.

The team was forced to vacate the title in 1997 when Héctor Garza left the promotion. La Fiera had been in semi-retirement since the early 2000s. During this final period of his career he wrestled only on a few select dates a year.

== Death ==
Hernandez was heavily involved with drugs toward the end of his life, having previously served a prison sentence in the 90s for dealing them. On September 10, 2010, Hernandez was stabbed five times during a mugging by an unknown assailant, and died from his injuries two days later at a Mexico City hospital, at the age of 49. It is speculated that his drug involvement is what led to him being stabbed, but no certain reason was found and his killer was never found.

== Championships and accomplishments ==
- Empresa Mexicana de Lucha Libre
  - CMLL World Trios Championship (1 time) – with Dos Caras and Héctor Garza
  - NWA World Middleweight Championship (1 time)
  - NWA World Welterweight Championship (1 time)
  - Torneo de Trios (2001) – with Gigante Silva
- Mexican local promotions
  - Puebla Lightweight Championship (1 time)

== Luchas de Apuestas record ==
Winner (wager)	Loser (wager)	Location	Event	Date	Notes
La Fiera (hair)	Cachorro Mendoza (hair)	Mexico City	Live event	N/A	
Pirata Morgan (hair)	La Fiera (hair)	N/A	Live event	N/A	
La Fiera and Mocho Cota (hair)	Ringo and Cachorro Mendoza (hair)	Mexico City	Live event	July 1, 1983	
El Satánico (hair)	La Fiera (hair)	Mexico City	Live event	September 16, 1983	
El Faraón (hair)	La Fiera (hair)	Mexico City	Live event	February 23, 1986	
La Fiera (hair)	Babe Face (hair)	Mexico City	Live event	1986	
Sangre Chicana (hair)	La Fiera (hair)	Mexico City	Live event	November 1987	
Eddy Guerrero (hair)	La Fiera (hair)	Juarez, Chihuahua	Live event	Late 1980s	
Jerry Estrada (hair)	La Fiera (hair)	Mexico City	Live event	September 8, 1991	
El Dandy (hair)	La Fiera (hair)	Mexico City	Live event	November 27, 1992	
La Fiera (hair)	Ángel Negro (hair)	Guadalajara, Jalisco	Live event	June 20, 1993	
La Fiera (hair)	Sangre Chicana (hair)	Mexico City	Live event	July 2, 1993	
Negro Casas (hair)	La Fiera (hair)	Mexico City	CMLL 60th Anniversary Show	October 1, 1993	
Emilio Charles, Jr. (hair)	La Fiera (hair)	Mexico City	38. Aniversario de Arena México	April 15, 1994	
La Fiera (hair)	Black Magic (hair)	Mexico City	Live event	December 16, 1994	
Sangre Chicana (hair)	La Fiera (hair)	Mexico City	Live event	March 17, 1995	
La Fiera (hair)	Kahoz (hair)	Mexico City	Live event	June 1996	
Silver King (hair)	La Fiera (hair)	Mexico City	Homenaje a Salvador Lutteroth	March 21, 1997	
La Fiera (hair)	Bestia Salvaje (hair)	Mexico City	Live event	August 29, 1997	

== See also ==
- List of premature professional wrestling deaths
