= Américo Rocca =

Mexican professional wrestler

Personal information
- Born: Javier Hernández Padilla; September 22, 1952 (age 74)

Professional wrestling career
- Ring name(s): Américo Rocca; Javier Rocca; Ninja Samurai; Ponzoña
- Billed height: 1.70 m (5 ft 7 in)
- Billed weight: 89 kg (196 lb)
- Trained by: Diablo Velazco
- Debut: January 15, 1975

Javier Hernández Padilla (born September 22, 1952) is a semi-retired Mexican professional wrestler best known under the ring name Américo Rocca. Hernández also worked as the enmascarado (masked) Ponzoña from 1990 until 1994, and as Ninja Samurai for a brief time in 1994. Hernández is a former holder of the Mexican National Lightweight Championship and a three-time holder of both the Mexican National Welterweight Championship and the NWA World Welterweight Championship all promoted by the professional wrestling promotion Empresa Mexicana de Lucha Libre (EMLL).

== Professional wrestling career ==
Hernández made his professional wrestling debut in 1975, using the ring name Xavier "Américo" Rocca, later shortened to just "Américo Rocca". Just over two years after his debut Rocca defeated Flama Azul to win the Mexican National Lightweight Championship; he held the title for 82 days before losing it back to Flama Azul. On February 2, 1978, Rocca won the Mexican National Welterweight Championship from Kung Fu, holding it for 435 days before losing it to Lizmark. The following year, on April 30, 1979, Rocca won the NWA World Welterweight Championship from Mano Negra. Rocca made several successful title defenses in the following 264 days before losing the title to Kato Kung Lee on January 19, 1980. Just under two months later he won the Mexican Welterweight title once more, defeating Lizmark to regain the title. His second Mexican Welterweight title run lasted 217 days before he lost the championship to Franco Columbo on November 1, 1980. On July 18, 1982, Rocca defeated La Fiera to win his second NWA World Welterweight Championship. After a reign lasting 558 days, he lost it to Mocho Cota. On March 29, 1985, Rocca won his third and final Mexican National Welterweight Championship by beating El Talisman for the championship. His final title reign lasted 156 days before he lost it to El Dandy. On February 11, 1986, Rocca won his last major title when he gained a measure of revenge against El Dandy by defeating him for the NWA World Welterweight Championship. His last title reign would also be his longest, lasting 606 days, before Solar II defeated him for the championship on June 30, 1988.

In 1990 Rocca adopted a new ring persona, Ponzoña (Spanish for "Poison"), a character used by Antonio Peña's father in the 1960s and brought back with Peña's permission. Hernández worked as the masked Ponzoña until 1994, after which he resumed working as Américo Rocca on the Mexican independent circuit. In recent years Hernández sons have begun wrestling as well under the names Américo Rocca, Jr. and Xavier Rocca.

== Championships and accomplishments ==
- Empresa Mexicana de Lucha Libre
  - Mexican National Lightweight Championship (3 times)
  - Mexican National Welterweight Championship (3 times)
  - NWA World Welterweight Championship (3 times)
- Occidente Championships
  - Occidente Welterweight Championship (1 time)
  - Occidente Light Heavyweight Championship (1 time)
- Local championships
  - Sinaloa Welterweight Championship (1 time)
  - Arena Azteca Budokan Welterweight Championship (1 time)

== Luchas de Apuestas record ==
Winner (wager)	Loser (wager)	Location	Event	Date	Notes
Américo Rocca (hair)	Black Killer (hair)	Guadalajara, Jalisco	Live event	N/A	
Pepe Aguayo (hair)	Américo Rocca (hair)	Guadalajara, Jalisco	Live event	N/A	
Lizmark (mask)	Américo Rocca (hair)	N/A	Live event	N/A	
Talismán (mask)	Américo Rocca (hair)	Mexico City	Live event	N/A	
Gran Cochisse (hair)	Americo Rocca (hair)	Mexico City	EMLL 46th Anniversary Show	September 21, 1979	
Américo Rocca and Divino Roy (hair)	Gran Cochisse and Águila India (hair)	Mexico City	25. Aniversario de Arena México	April 3, 1981	
Espectro Jr. (mask) and Américo Rocca (hair)	Alfil (mask) and Cachorro Mendoza (hair)	Mexico City	Live event	December 4, 1981	
Américo Rocca and Gran Cochisse (hair)	Comando Ruso I and Comando Ruso II (hair)	Mexico City	Live event	July 17, 1984	
Talismán (mask)	Américo Rocca (hair)	Mexico City	Live event	October 26, 1984	
Ringo Mendoza, Américo Rocca and Tony Salazar (hair)	Los Misioneros de la Muerte (hair) (El Signo, El Texano and Negro Navarro)	Mexico City	EMLL 53rd Anniversary Show	September 19, 1986	
Américo Rocca (hair)	Talismán (hair)	Mexico City	Live event	1987	
Americo Rocca, Chamaco Valaguez and Javier Llanes (hair)	Los Destructores (hair) (Emilio Charles, Jr., Tony Arce and Vulcano)	Mexico City	Live event	July 31, 1987	
Rangers del Norte (hair)	Américo Rocca and Chamaco Valaguez (hair)	N/A	Live event	1990	
Javier Llanes (hair)	Americo Rocca (hair)	Mexico City	Live event	September 2, 1990	
Américo Rocca (hair)	Kung Fu (hair)	Mexico City	Live event	May 8, 1994	
El Cafre (hair)	Américo Rocca (hair)	Mexico City	Live event	June 12, 1994	
Javier Cruz (hair)	Americo Rocca (hair)	Mexico City	Live event	October 14, 1994	
Américo Rocca (hair)	Reyes Veloz (hair)	Mexico City	Live event	July 25, 1995	
Américo Rocca (hair)	Ringo Mendoza (hair)	Mexico City	Live event	February 16, 1996	
Américo Rocca (hair)	Kid Guzmán (hair)	Mexico City	Live event	April 27, 1999	
Ricky Marvin (hair)	Américo Rocca (hair)	Mexico City	Live event	May 27, 2001	
Javier Cruz (hair)	Americo Rocca (hair)	Guadalajara, Jalisco	Live event	May 5, 2002	
Javier Cruz (hair)	Americo Rocca (hair)	Guadalajara, Jalisco	Live event	January 2003	
Américo Rocca (hair)	Dimensión (mask)	Guadalajara, Jalisco	Live event	July 6, 2003	
Américo Rocca (hair)	Dimensión (hair)	Guadalajara, Jalisco	Live event	August 24, 2003	
Bestia Salvaje (hair)	Americo Rocca (hair)	Guadalajara, Jalisco	Live event	February 11, 2007	
