= EMLL 46th Anniversary Show =

Mexican Professional wrestling show

- Promotion: Empresa Mexicana de Lucha Libre
- Date: September 21, 1979
- City: Mexico City, Mexico
- Venue: Arena Coliseo
- Attendance: Unknown

Event chronology
← Previous; 23. Aniversario de Arena México	Next →: 24. Aniversario de Arena México

EMLL Anniversary Show chronology
← Previous; 45th Anniversary	Next → 47th Anniversary

The EMLL 46th Anniversary Show (Spanish: 46. Aniversario de EMLL) was a professional wrestling major show event produced by Empresa Mexicana de Lucha Libre (EMLL) that took place on September 21, 1979 in Arena Coliseo, Mexico City, Mexico. The event commemorated the 46th anniversary of EMLL, which would become the oldest professional wrestling promotion in the world. The Anniversary show is EMLL's biggest show of the year. The EMLL Anniversary Show series is the longest-running annual professional wrestling show, starting in 1934.

== Production ==
=== Background ===
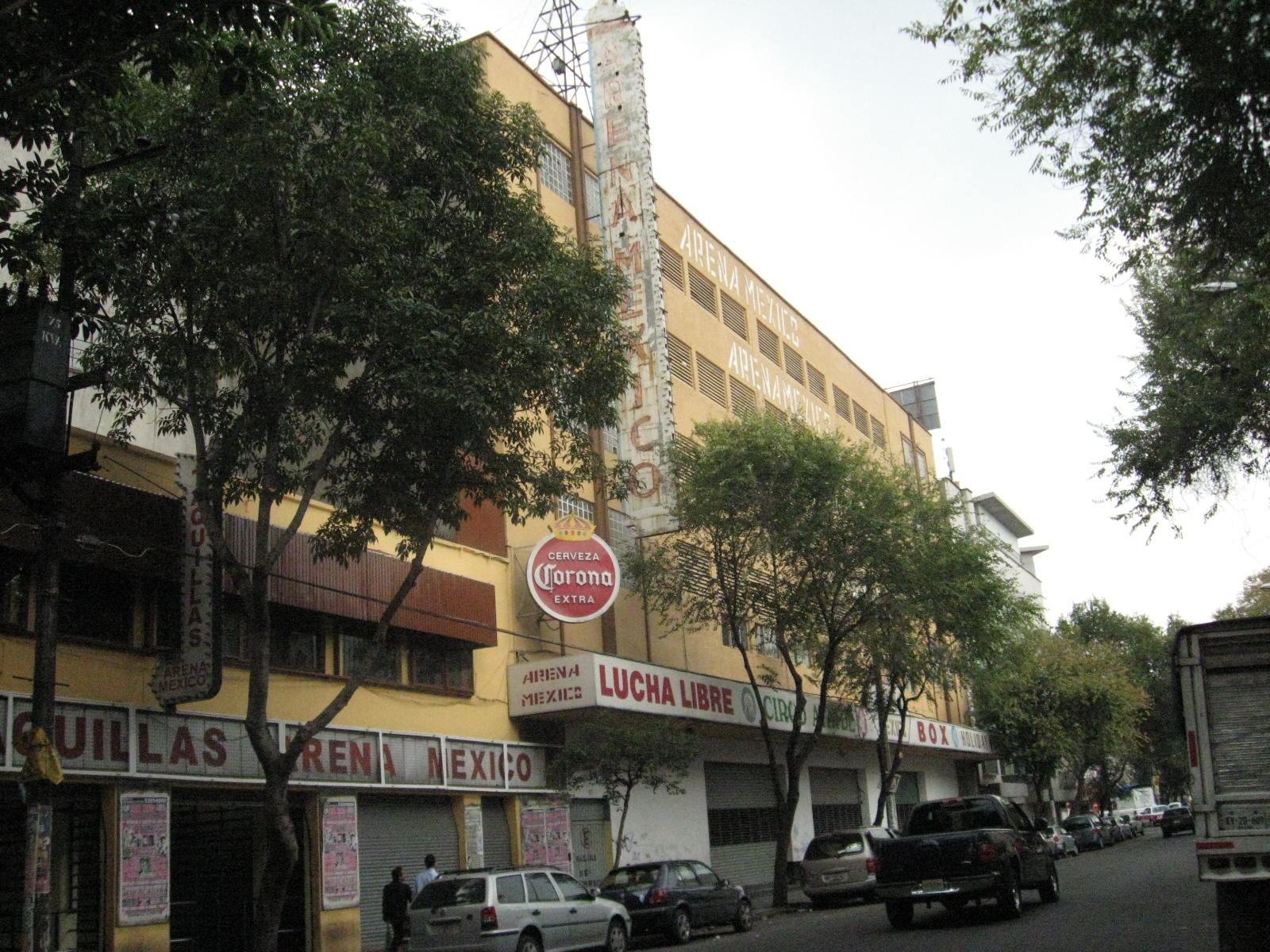
Arena México, CMLL's main venue and location of the Anniversary Show

The Mexican Lucha libre (professional wrestling) company Consejo Mundial de Lucha Libre (CMLL) started out under the name Empresa Mexicana de Lucha Libre ("Mexican Wrestling Company"; EMLL), founded by Salvador Lutteroth in 1933. Lutteroth, inspired by professional wrestling shows he had attended in Texas, decided to become a wrestling promoter and held his first show on September 21, 1933, marking what would be the beginning of organized professional wrestling in Mexico. Lutteroth would later become known as "the father of Lucha Libre" . A year later EMLL held the EMLL 1st Anniversary Show, starting the annual tradition of the Consejo Mundial de Lucha Libre Anniversary Shows that have been held each year ever since, most commonly in September.

Over the years the anniversary show would become the biggest show of the year for CMLL, akin to the Super Bowl for the National Football League (NFL) or WWE's WrestleMania event. The first anniversary show was held in Arena Modelo, which Lutteroth had bought after starting EMLL. In 1942–43 Lutteroth financed the construction of Arena Coliseo, which opened in April 1943. The EMLL 10th Anniversary Show was the first of the anniversary shows to be held in Arena Coliseo. In 1956 Lutteroth had Arena México built in the location of the original Arena Modelo, making Arena México the main venue of EMLL from that point on. Starting with the EMLL 23rd Anniversary Show, all anniversary shows except for the EMLL 46th Anniversary Show have been held in the arena that would become known as "The Cathedral of Lucha Libre". On occasion EMLL held more than one show labelled as their "Anniversary" show, such as two 33rd Anniversary Shows in 1966. Over time the anniversary show series became the oldest, longest-running annual professional wrestling show. In comparison, WWE's WrestleMania is only the fourth oldest still promoted show (CMLL's Arena Coliseo Anniversary Show and Arena México anniversary shows being second and third). Traditionally CMLL holds their major events on Friday Nights, replacing their regularly scheduled Super Viernes show.

=== Storylines ===
The event featured at least three professional wrestling matches with different wrestlers involved in pre-existing scripted feuds, plots and storylines. Wrestlers were portrayed as either heels (referred to as rudos in Mexico, those that portray the "bad guys") or faces (técnicos in Mexico, the "good guy" characters) as they followed a series of tension-building events, which culminated in a wrestling match or series of matches. Due to the nature of keeping mainly paper records of wrestling at the time no documentation has been found for some of the matches of the show.

== Event ==
In one of the few confirmed matches for the show NWA World Middleweight Champion, Japanese born Satoru Sayama successfully defended the championship against Mexican native Ringo Mendoza in a best two-out-of three falls match. In the main event both Gran Cochisse and Américo Rocca put their hair on the line in a Lucha de Apuestas hair vs. hair match, which was a result of a long running feud between the two. In the end Cochisse was successful and Américo Rocca was forced to have his long, curly hair shaved off completely while sitting in the middle of the ring.

== Aftermath ==
Satoru Sayama remained champion until March 28, 1980 when he was dethroned by El Satánico. Sayama later returned to his native Japan and became famous as the masked wrestling character "Tiger Mask".

== Results ==
No.	Results	Stipulations
1	Satoru Sayama (c) defeated Ringo Mendoza	Best two-out-of-three falls match for the NWA World Middleweight Championship
2	Gran Cochisse and Águila India vs. Américo Rocca and Sangre Chicana; Gran Cochisse and Sangre Chicana were defeated by pinfall	Relevos Suicidas tag team match
3	Gran Cochisse defeated Américo Rocca	Best two-out-of-three falls Lucha de Apuestas hair vs. hair match
(c) / – the champion(s) heading into the match
