= Gran Cochisse =

Mexican professional wrestler

Personal information
- Born: Juan José Barrón Medina; September 22, 1952 (age 73) Teocuitatlán de Corona, Jalisco, Mexico

Professional wrestling career
- Ring name(s): Espectro de Ultratumba; Gran Cochisse
- Billed height: 1.71 m (5 ft 7 1/2 in)
- Billed weight: 90 kg (198 lb)
- Trained by: Diablo Velazco
- Debut: October 2, 1966
- Retired: December 18, 2022

Juan José Barrón Medina (born September 22, 1952) is a retired Mexican professional wrestler, under the ring name Gran Cochisse. Barrón is currently working as one of the head trainers at the Gimnasio del Diablo Velazco wrestling school in Guadalajara, Jalisco, Mexico. The school is one of the wrestling schools for Consejo Mundial de Lucha Libre (CMLL). While wrestling he used the ring character Gran Cochisse, a Native American character that incorporated traditional Native American imagery including the feathered headdresses and facepaint. He was nicknamed El Indio Bravo ("The brave Indian") and is named after the Apache chief Cochise. Early in his career he often teamed with Águila India (Indian Eagle) to form a successful tag team. During his wrestling career Barrón held the UWA World Junior Heavyweight Championship one time and the NWA World Middleweight Championship three times.

== Professional wrestling career ==
Juan Barrón made his professional wrestling debut on October 2, 1966, at only 14 years of age, after training under Mexico's most renowned wrestling trainer Diablo Velazco. Barrón adopted a Native American character while wrestling called "Gran Cochisse" ("The Great Cochise") named after the Apache chief Cochise. Gran Cochisse wore the traditional feathered headdresses, facepaint and often carried a tomahawk with him to the ring to support the character. Gran Cochisse formed a regular tag team with Aguila India ("Indian Eagle"), to form a very popular and successful tag team. Together the team held the Occidente (western) Tag Team Championship at least once.

It was not until 1984, a full 18 years after his debut that Gran Cochisse won his first major singles title when he defeated El Satánico on AUgust 18, 1984 to win the NWA World Middleweight Championship. His first reign with the title only lasted 27 days, as he lost it to Satánico on September 14 that same year as part of a long running feud between the two. Cochisse regained the title from Satánico only a few weeks later on September 30, 1984, and held it until November 18, 1984, before losing it to Gran Hamada Gran Cochisse's third and final run with the NWA World Middleweight Championship began on May 18, 1986, when he defeated Chamaco Valaguez to win the title and lasted 152 days, longer than his previous two reigns combined, until he was pinned by Kung Fu on October 17, 1986, and lost the belt. In the latter years of the 1980s Gran Cochisse began working for the Universal Wrestling Association (UWA) where he became the UWA World Junior Light Heavyweight Champion on September 16, 1988, by defeating Blue Panther. His run with the UWA title lasted for 225 days in total, until April 29, 1989, when he was beaten by Ringo Mendoza. In the early part of the 1990s Barrón worked as an enmascarado, or masked, character called Espectro de Ultratumba ("The Ghost from beyond the grave") but by then it was obvious that his career as an active wrestler was winding down. In the late 1990s Gran Cochisse greatly reduced his schedule and began working full-time training wrestlers.

== Wrestlers trained ==
Gran Cochisse is one of the trainers for CMLL's wrestling school in Guadalajara, Jalisco, Mexico and thus has been involved in training a lot of the wrestlers CMLL currently employs as well as students who have gone on to work for other promotions around the world. The following is a list of some of the wrestlers Gran Cochisse has trained.

- Acertijo
- Perro Aguayo, Jr.
- Ángel de Oro
- Ángel de Plata
- Azazel
- Casanova
- Drago
- El Gallo
- Frail de la Muerte
- Guero Loco
- Hierro
- Horus
- Idolo
- Katana
- Leon Blanco
- Malefico
- Máscara Dorada
- Metatron
- Meteoro
- Nube Roja
- Palacio Negro
- Pequeño Black Warrior
- Pierroth, Jr.
- Relampago Azul
- Saturno
- Silueta
- Thunder Boy
- Ultimo Dragoncito
- Valentine Mayo
- Virgo

== Personal life ==
Barrón is married to retired professional wrestler La Magnífica and together they have at least four children. One their daughter wrestles as the current version of La Magnífica while another daughter wrestles under the name Super Estrella. Their son wrestles as Saturno who is under a CMLL contract. He is the father-in-law of CMLL wrestler El Sagrado who is married to one of Barrón's daughters that is not involved in professional wrestling.

== Championships and accomplishments ==
- Empresa Mexicana de Lucha Libre
  - NWA World Middleweight Championship (3 times)
- Universal Wrestling Association
  - UWA World Junior Heavyweight Championship (1 time)
- Western Mexico
  - Occidente Tag Team Championship (1 time) - with Águila India

== Luchas de Apuestas record ==
Winner (wager)	Loser (wager)	Location	Event	Date	Notes
Comando Ruso (hair)	Gran Cochisse (hair)	Guadalajara, Jalisco	Live event	Unknown	
Calavera I (hair)	Gran Cochisse (hair)	Guadalajara, Jalisco	Live event	Unknown	
Gran Cochisse (hair)	Manuel Robles (hair)	Mexico City	Live event	Unknown	
Gran Cochisse (hair)	Bruno Victoria (hair)	Mexico City	Live event	Unknown	
Gran Cochisse (hair)	El Nazi (hair)	Mexico City	Live event	Unknown	
Gran Cochisse (hair)	Franco Colombo (hair)	Mexico City	Live event	Unknown	
Calavera I and Calavera II (hair)	Gran Cochisse and Águila India (hair)	Guadalajara, Jalisco	Live event	1979	
Gran Cochisse (hair)	Américo Rocca (hair)	Mexico City	EMLL 46th Anniversary Show	September 21, 1979	(Note: Tag team match between Rocca and Sangre Chicana against Gran Cochisse and Águila India where the loser of the fall would have his hair shaved off.)
Sangre Chicana (hair)	Gran Cochisse (hair)	Mexico City	Live event	October 19, 1979	
Américo Rocca and Divino Roy (hair)	Gran Cochisse and Águila India (hair)	Mexico City	25. Aniversario de Arena México	April 3, 1981	
Chamaco Valaguez (hair)	Gran Cochisse (hair)	Mexico City	Live event	July 1981	
Gran Cochisse (hair)	Leo López (hair)	Mexico City	Live event	January 30, 1983	
Gran Cochisse (hair)	Mocho Cota (hair)	Mexico City	Live event	March 25, 1983	
Águila India (hair)	Gran Cochisse (hair)	Mexico City	Live event	July 30, 1983	
Gran Cochisse (hair)	Mocho Cota (hair)	Mexico City	Live event	September 9, 1983	
Enfermero Jr. (hair)	Gran Cochisse (hair)	Mexico City	Live event	September 30, 1983	
Américo Rocca and Gran Cochisse (hair)	Comando Ruso I and Comando Ruso II (hair)	Mexico City	Live event	July 17, 1984	
El Dandy (hair)	Gran Cochisse (hair)	Mexico City	Live event	December 1985	
Remo Banda (hair)	Gran Cochisse (hair)	Mexico City	Live event	May 5, 1990	
