= El Dandy =

Mexican professional wrestler (born 1962)

Personal information
- Born: Roberto Gutiérrez Frías; October 2, 1962 (age 64) Guadalajara Jalisco, Mexico

Professional wrestling career
- Ring name: El Dandy
- Billed height: 1.70 m (5 ft 7 in)
- Billed weight: 91 kg (201 lb)
- Trained by: Diablo Velasco; Pedro Anguiano
- Debut: 1982

Roberto Gutiérrez Frías (born October 2, 1962), best known under the ring name El Dandy, is a Mexican professional wrestling trainer and former professional wrestler. He has wrestled for most major Mexican promotions, including Consejo Mundial de Lucha Libre (CMLL), Lucha Libre AAA Worldwide (AAA), Universal Wrestling Association (UWA), World Wrestling Association (WWA) and International Wrestling Revolution Group (IWRG). In addition, he has worked for the United States-based World Championship Wrestling (WCW), as well as the Japanese Super World of Sports (SWS) and International Wrestling Association of Japan (IWA Japan).

During his career, El Dandy won a number of championships, including the CMLL World Middleweight Championship three times, the NWA World Light Heavyweight Championship, the NWA World Welterweight Championship twice, the Mexican National Featherweight Championship, the Mexican National Light Heavyweight Championship twice, the Mexican National Middleweight Championship, the Mexican National Welterweight Championship, the WWA World Light Heavyweight Championship, and the WWA World Tag Team Championship. In WCW, he was a part of the Latino World Order stable and a tag team known as Los Fabulosos with Silver King. A 2004 match against L.A. Park was voted "Match of the Year" by readers of Box y Lucha magazine. He had a retirement tour in 2014 and continued to wrestle until March 2019.

== Professional wrestling career ==
Gutiérrez began training for a wrestling career at the age of 14, training under Diablo Velazco in his hometown of Guadalajara. After five years of training he finally, but reluctantly, made his in-ring debut. Gutiérrez later stated that he was nervous for his debut in part because of his fear of the public. He opted to use the ring name "El Dandy", which several Guadalajara wrestlers gave him due to his success with women. He made his debut as an enmascarado ("masked wrestler"), teaming with Águila Solitaria against Black Indian and Chamaco Hernández. A local promoter asked Gutiérrez if he would prefer to wrestle unmasked instead, leading to Gutiérrez losing the mask and wrestling without it for the rest of his career. At the time, his family did not know he had become a wrestler until they saw him on TV against El Dorado. While the match was so well received that the fans in the arena threw money in the ring, Gutiérrez's parents were not enthused with his career choice.

=== Empresa Mexicana de Lucha Libre / Consejo Mundial de Lucha Libre (1982–1998) ===
Shortly after, Empresa Mexicana de Lucha Libre (EMLL) representatives invited Gutiérrez to Mexico City to work for them; he credited Mocho Cota and Herodes for getting him there. Early in his EMLL career, he had to wash clothes for several wrestlers to earn enough money for food. El Dandy won his first championship on July 31, 1982, defeating El Modulo for the Mexican National Featherweight Championship. His 175-day reign ended when Pequeño Solin defeated him on January 22, 1983. Two weeks later, El Dandy won his first Lucha de Apuestas ("bet match", considered more prestigious than a championship win in lucha libre) against El Guerrero, who was shaved bald as a result. By 1984, El Dandy formed the trio Los Bravos ("The Braves") with Fuerza Guerrera and Talisman. They defeated Los Destructores (Lemús II, Tony Arce, and Vulcano) in a Lucha de Apuestas on July 5, winning the mask of Lemus II and hair of Arce and Vulcano. On September 1, 1985, El Dandy defeated Américo Rocca to win the Mexican National Welterweight Championship. He won the NWA World Welterweight Championship 77 days later and, in the process, relinquished the lower ranking Mexican National title. His 141-day reign was ended by Javier Cruz, as part of a long-running storyline feud between the two. El Dandy regained the championship on August 24, holding it for 70 days before losing it to Rocca.

Having competed as a welterweight for years, a weight class with a maximum limit of 78 kg (172 lb), El Dandy progressed to the middleweight division, limited to a top weight of 87 kg (192 lb). On July 17, 1987, he defeated Kung Fu to win the NWA World Middleweight Championship. Afterwards, El Dandy became involved in a storyline feud with El Satánico, who helped Kung Fu cheat to regain the championship as part of the build to a Lucha de Apuestas between the two. Before it, El Dandy defeated Satánico to win the Mexican National Middleweight Championship on September 28. Weeks later, however, El Dandy lost to Satánico in the Lucha de Apuestas. His Mexican National Middleweight Championship reign, lasting 112 days, ended when Javier Cruz won the championship. In June 1990, El Dandy defeated Ángel Azteca for his second NWA World Middleweight Championship, holding it for 61 days until Atlantis won the title from him. The storyline between El Dandy and Satánico was again brought to the forefront months later, with El Dandy defeating Satánico at Juicio Final ("Final Justice") on December 14. The following year, Satánico defeated El Dandy in their third overall Lucha de Apuestas, followed by El Dandy winning the fourth at the CMLL 59th Anniversary Show on September 18 to even the score.

In 1992, when EMLL changed its name to Consejo Mundial de Lucha Libre (CMLL) and created various new championships, El Dandy defeated Negro Casas to win the new CMLL World Middleweight Championship. His reign was ended by Bestia Salvaje on September 4. El Dandy regained the championship in December, with his second reign lasting until May 1993. His third reign started on October 5 and lasted until February 22, 1994, when he lost it to Javier Llanes. El Dandy moved into the light heavyweight division after defeating Jaque Mate for the NWA World Light Heavyweight Championship. In 1996, El Dandy won two Lucha de Apuestas encounters, winning the hair of Babe Face and Chicago Express on August 1 and September 3, respectively. On October 15, El Dandy's 681-day reign as champion was ended by Black Warrior. He subsequently lost a Lucha de Apuestas to El Hijo del Santo in the main event of Juicio Final on December 6. El Dandy later competed in a tournament for the vacant CMLL World Trios Championship alongside Héctor Garza and Vampiro Canadiense, defeating Apolo Dantés, Guerrera and Gran Markus Jr. in the first round, before losing to Salvaje, Scorpio Jr. and Zumbido in the semi-finals.

=== World Wrestling Association (1993, 2000–2001, 2007) ===
While working for CMLL, El Dandy also wrestled for the World Wrestling Association (WWA) in Tijuana, as he was allowed to take independent bookings on days he was not needed for CMLL shows. El Dandy and Corazón de León defeated Los Cowboys (El Texano and Silver King) to win the WWA Tag Team Championship on July 21, 1993, but lost it back to them 42 days later. El Dandy returned to WWA in 2000, teaming with Silver King to win the championship for a second time, defeating Los Brazos (Brazo de Oro and Brazo de Plata) on November 10. He also defeated La Parka to win the WWA World Light Heavyweight Championship in early 2001. El Dandy lost both championships on June 17; Antifaz and La Parka won the tag team championship, while Asterico won the light heavyweight title. El Dandy won his third WWA World Tag Team Championship on August 27, 2007, teaming with Rey Misterio to claim the vacant title; they later vacated it for undisclosed reasons.

=== World Championship Wrestling (1997–2000) ===
In 1997, El Dandy was one of many Mexican wrestlers that began working for the United States-based World Championship Wrestling (WCW). His televised debut took place on September 28, as he and Damian lost to nWo Japan (Masahiro Chono and The Great Muta). His first pay-per-view (PPV) match was as part of the 60-man battle royal main event of World War 3 on November 23. On January 6, 1998, he unsuccessfully challenged Juventud Guerrera for the WCW World Cruiserweight Championship. At Souled Out on January 24, El Dandy, La Parka, Psicosis and Silver King lost to Chavo Guerrero Jr., Guerrera, Lizmark Jr. and Super Caló. At Slamboree on May 17, El Dandy was one of fifteen wrestlers involved in a battle royal where the winner of the match would face Chris Jericho for the WCW World Cruiserweight Championship. During his introductions, Jericho referred to him as the "winner of the Lou Ferrigno look-a-like contest".

Later that year, El Dandy became a member of the Latino World Order, a group of Mexican wrestlers led by Eddie Guerrero. Shortly after Guerrero's real-life car accident on New Year's Day, however, the group was forced to disband by the reformed nWo. The following year, El Dandy unsuccessfully challenged Lenny for the WCW World Cruiserweight Championship. One of El Dandy's most notable moments came not from the ring, but from an interview made by Bret Hart. Hart had selected El Dandy as his opponent, leading interviewer Gene Okerlund to question why Hart had selected such an easy opponent. Hart responded by saying "Who are you to doubt El Dandy? ‘Cause this guy's a serious professional." In early 2000, El Dandy and Silver King competed under the name Los Fabulosos, defeating XS (Lane and Rave) on March 21 in their first televised match under that name. They later lost to Harlem Heat 2000 (Big T and Stevie Ray) in El Dandy's last match with WCW.

=== Mexican independent circuit (2000–2019) ===
El Dandy generally worked for various independent promotions upon returning to Mexico. On October 15, 2004, he lost the Mexican National Light Heavyweight Championship to L.A. Park, but regained it five months later. His second reign lasted 750 days until Vangelis won the title on April 15, 2007. In February 2009, El Dandy unsuccessfully challenged Blue Demon Jr. for the NWA Worlds Heavyweight Championship. Later that year, El Dandy pinned El Signo in a seven-man steel cage Lucha de Apuestas, causing El Signo to be shaved bald after the match.

In 2014, El Dandy began his retirement tour, facing off against longtime rival El Satánico in various local shows around the country. The rivals split the first four matches between them, leading to "El Juicio Final" on May 18. El Dandy won the match to force Satánico to be shaved bald. Twelve days later, in what was billed as his last match, El Dandy defeated Satánico one more time. While the 2014 tour was meant to be his retirement, El Dandy returned to the ring on November 8, 2015, for CMLL, as he and Negro Casas defeated Mr. Niebla and Satánico. He would also work a limited schedule, with four matches in 2016 and one in both 2017 and 2019.

=== International Wrestling Revolution Group (2000–2004) ===
El Dandy began working for the Naucalpan-based International Wrestling Revolution Group (IWRG) in 2000. His first match on July 6 saw him, Ciclon Ramirez, Kato Kung Lee and Super Parka lose to Bombero Infernal, Dr. Cerebro, Mosco de la Merced and Super Crazy. On February 8, 2002, he failed to win Scorpio Jr.'s IWRG Intercontinental Heavyweight Championship. The following year, El Dandy successfully defended the Mexican National Light Heavyweight Championship twice in IWRG against Casas and Blue Panther. He was one of eight wrestlers who put his hair on the line in a multi-man Lucha de Apuestas; Suicida lost the match and his hair. On March 18, 2007, El Dandy was involved in a steel cage match where both his light heavyweight championship and the IWRG Intercontinental Welterweight Championship were on the line. In the end, Fantasma de la Ópera defeated Dr. Cerebro to win the IWRG title. El Dandy's last match with the group took place a week later, where Damián 666, Misterioso Jr. and Villano III defeated him, El Sagrado and Máscara Sagrada by disqualification.

=== AAA (2002–2003) ===
El Dandy made his AAA debut on May 5, 2002. He, Máscara Maligna, Máscara Sagrada and Perro Aguayo Jr. faced off in a steel cage match where the last person in the ring would either be forced to unmask or have their hair shaved off. Neither Dandy nor Aguayo were involved in the finish, in which Maligna lost and was unmasked. Two weeks later, El Dandy defeated Aguayo Jr. to win the Mexican National Light Heavyweight Championship. The storyline ended in the main event of Verano de Escándalo ("Summer of Scandal") on September 15, where Dandy, Aguayo, Electroshock and El Zorro faced off in a four-way Lucha de Apuestas. In the end, Aguayo Jr. pinned El Dandy, who was forced to be shaved bald as a result. El Dandy's last AAA match, a victory over El Hijo del Santo, took place on May 11, 2003.

== Personal life ==
At one point, Gutiérrez suffered a serious back injury that left him unable to perform for three months. During this difficult time, Gutiérrez contemplated suicide on more than one occasion, especially as few of his fellow wrestlers kept in contact with him. He found solace in chiropractic and has since opened a full-time practice. In early 2020, he was mentioned as a new member of the Mexico City boxing and lucha libre commission, assisting the commission in enforcing their rules and statutes.

== Reception ==
During El Dandy's days in EMLL, Wrestling Observer Newsletter founder Dave Meltzer stated that El Dandy was one of the "three best workers" in EMLL. In 1997, Pro Wrestling Illustrated (PWI) ranked him at #167 in their "top 500" for the year. Writer Matt Farmer stated that El Dandy was "highly underrated" and that he had "phenomenal matches" with Perro Aguayo Jr. during their 2002 feud. His 2004 match against L.A. Park was voted the "Match of the year" by readers of Box y Lucha magazine.

== Championships and accomplishments ==
- AAA
  - Mexican National Light Heavyweight Championship (2 times)
- Comision National de Box y Lucha
  - Mexican National Featherweight Championship (1 time)
- Empresa Mexicana de Lucha Libre / Consejo Mundial de Lucha Libre
  - CMLL World Middleweight Championship (3 times)
  - Copa de Oro 1994 – with Apolo Dantés
  - NWA World Light Heavyweight Championship (1 time)
  - NWA World Middleweight Championship (2 times)
  - NWA World Welterweight Championship (2 times)
  - Mexican National Middleweight Championship (1 time)
  - Mexican National Welterweight Championship (1 time)
- Pro Wrestling Illustrated
  - Ranked #167 of the 500 best singles wrestlers in the 1997 edition of PWI 500
- World Wrestling Association
  - WWA World Light Heavyweight Championship (1 time)
  - WWA World Tag Team Championship (3 times) – with Corazón de León, Silver King (1) and Rey Misterio

== Luchas de Apuestas record ==
Winner (wager)	Loser (wager)	Location	Event	Date	Notes
El Dandy (hair)	El Guerrero (hair)	Acapulco, Guerrero	Live event	February 2, 1983	
Draw	El Dandy (hair) / Dardo Aguilar (hair)	Mexico City	Live event	May 29, 1983	
El Dandy (hair)	Módulo (hair)	Mexico City	Live event	July 31, 1983	
El Dandy (hair)	Módulo (hair)	Mexico City	Live event	August 7, 1983	
El Dandy (hair)	Joel García (hair)	Mexico City	Live event	December 14, 1983	
El Dandy (hair)	Javier Cruz (hair)	Mexico City	Live event	October 26, 1984	(Note: This was a three-way match that also included El Hijo del Santo.)
El Dandy (hair)	Gran Cochisse (hair)	Mexico City	Super Viernes	December 6, 1985	
Los Bravos (Fuerza Guerrera (mask), El Dandy (hair) and Talisman (hair)	Los Destructores (Lemús II (mask), Tony Arce (hair) and Vulcano (hair))	Mexico City	Live Event	July 5, 1985	
El Dandy (hair)	Javier Cruz (hair)	Mexico City	Live event	August 31, 1986	
Los Misioneros de la Muerte (hair) (El Signo, El Texano and Negro Navarro)	El Dandy, Talismán and Jerry Estrada (hair)	Mexico City	Live event	September 5, 1986	
El Dandy (hair)	Aristóteles I (hair)	Acapulco, Guerrero	Live event	March 18, 1987	
El Dandy (hair)	Hombre Bala (hair)	N/A	CMLL show	August 1987	
El Satánico (hair)	El Dandy (hair)	Mexico City	CMLL show	October 1987	
El Dandy and Javier Cruz (hair)	Rizado Ruiz and Rudy Reyna (hair)	Acapulco, Guerrero	Live event	May 4, 1988	
El Dandy (hair)	Pirata Morgan (hair)	Mexico City	Super Viernes	September 23, 1988	
El Dandy (hair)	Bestia Salvaje (hair)	Mexico City	EMLL show	October 2, 1988	
Draw	El Dandy (hair); Emilio Charles Jr. (hair)	Mexico City	Super Viernes	July 28, 1989	(Note: Charles and El Dandy wrestled to a draw, therefore both men lost their hair.)
El Dandy (hair)	El Satánico (hair)	Mexico City	Juicio Final	December 14, 1990	
El Satánico (hair)	El Dandy (hair)	Mexico City	Live event	December 6, 1991	
El Dandy (hair)	El Satánico (hair)	Mexico City	CMLL 59th Anniversary Show	September 18, 1992	
El Dandy (hair)	La Fiera (hair)	Mexico City	CMLL show	November 27, 1992	
Emilio Charles Jr. (hair)	El Dandy (hair)	Mexico City	CMLL show	October 29, 1993	
El Dandy (hair)	Stuka Jr. (Note: Not the Stuka Jr. who made his debut in 2002.)	Mexico City	CMLL show	December 14, 1993	
El Dandy (hair)	Babe Face (hair)	Mexico City	CMLL show	August 1, 1996	
El Dandy (hair)	Chicago Express (hair)	Mexico City	Martes De Coliseo	September 3, 1996	
El Hijo del Santo (hair)	El Dandy (hair)	Mexico City	Juicio Final	December 6, 1996	(Note: This was a three-way match that also included Negro Casas.)
Antifaz del Norte (mask)	El Dandy (hair)	Monterrey, Nuevo León	Live event	September 17, 2000	
El Dandy (hair)	Brazo de Platino (hair)	Cuernavaca, Morelos	Live event	May 30, 2001	
L.A. Park (mask)	El Dandy (hair)	Nuevo Laredo, Tamaulipas	Live event	April 6, 2001	(Note: This was a three-way match that also included Bestia Salvaje.)
El Dandy (hair)	Negro Navarro (hair)	Tlalnepantla de Baz, Mexico State	Live event	September 3, 2001	
El Dandy (hair)	El Enterrador (hair)	Naucalpan, Mexico State	Live event	February 14, 2002	(Note: El Dandy and El Enterrador were the last two wrestlers in a ten-man steel cage match.)
Perro Aguayo Jr. (hair)	El Dandy (hair)	Monterrey, Nuevo León	Verano de Escándalo	September 16, 2002	(Note: This was a four-way match that also included Hátor and El Zorro.)
El Hijo del Santo (mask)	El Dandy (hair)	Tijuana, Baja California	Live event	October 29, 2004	
El Dandy (hair)	Pantera (hair)	Naucalpan, State of Mexico	IWRG show	June 19, 2008	
El Dandy (hair)	El Signo (hair)	Pachuca, Hidalgo	Pipino Cuevas Benefit Show	September 24, 2009	(Note: This was a 7-man steel cage match that also included El Fantasma, El Oriental, Super Muñeco, Villano III, and Villano IV.)
El Dandy (hair)	El Satánico (hair)	Reynosa Tamaulipas	El Juicio Final	May 18, 2014	
