= Mexican National Middleweight Championship =

Professional wrestling championship

Details
- Promotion: Empresa Mexicana de Lucha Libre (1933–1992); Asistencia Asesoría y Administración/AAA (1991–2008); Consejo Mundial de Lucha Libre (2021–present)
- Date established: 1933
- Current champion: Rey Pegasus
- Date won: September 25, 2026
Statistics
- First champion: Yaqui Joe
- Most reigns: El Santo, Octagón (4 reigns)
- Longest reign: El Santo (2,400 days, disputed)
- Shortest reign: Perro Aguayo & Máscara Sagrada Jr. (21 days)

The Mexican National Middleweight Championship (Campeonato Nacional de Peso Medio) is a professional wrestling championship controlled by the Comisión de Box y Lucha Libre Mexico D.F. (Mexico City Boxing and Wrestling Commission). The official weight definition of the middleweight division in Mexico is from 82 to 87 kg (181 to 192 lb). (Note: Comisión de Box y Lucha Libre (2001): "Articulo 242: Super Welter 82 kilos / Medio 87 kilos" ("Article 242: Super Welter 82 kilos / Middleweight 87 kilos")) The championship was created in 1933 and was promoted regularly until December 8, 2008. Empresa Mexicana de Lucha Libre (EMLL) had control of the championship from its creation until 1992, (Note: EMLL was renamed Consejo Mundial de Lucha Libre (CMLL) in late 1991) at which point it was transferred to Lucha Libre AAA Worldwide (AAA). (Note: In this, "control" refers to the everyday use of the title, determination of storylines in which the title is being used, selection of wrestlers who challenge the title, and use the championship's name for public relations.) The championship's history between 1933 and 1937 is only partially known; for some periods it is unclear who held the championship. The first champion was Yaqui Joe; records of the identity of his opponent for the championship are unclear. In early 2009, AAA stopped promoting all Mexican National Championships, opting to focus on its AAA-branded championships instead. In 2021, the championship was reactivated by Consejo Mundial de Lucha Libre, with Templario defeating Dragón Rojo Jr. to win the vacant title. As with all professional wrestling championships, matches for the Mexican National Tag Team Championship were not won or lost competitively but by a pre-planned ending to the match, the outcome of which was determined by the CMLL bookers and match makers. (Note: Hornbaker (2016) p. 550: "Professional wrestling is a sport in which match finishes are predetermined. Thus, win–loss records are not indicative of a wrestler's genuine success based on their legitimate abilities – but on now much, or how little they were pushed by promoters.")

There have been at least 64 championship reigns, and 39 wrestlers have held the championship. El Santo and Octagón both held it four times, the most for any wrestler. The longest confirmed reign belongs to El Santo. His third reign lasted 2,400 days from September 14, 1956, to April 11, 1963. (Note: Due to gaps in the title's history, it is not clear if there was a longer reign.) The shortest reign lasted 21 days; a tie between Perro Aguayo in 1977 and Máscara Sagrada Jr. in 1999. The current champion is Rey Pegasus, who is in his first reign. He won the title by defeating Guerrero Maya Jr. at Noche de Campeones on September 25, 2026.

== Title history ==
Key
No.	Overall reign number
Reign	Reign number for the specific champion
Days	Number of days held
N/A	Unknown information
(NLT)	Championship change took place "no later than" the date listed

No.	Champion	Championship change			Reign statistics		Notes	Ref.
No.	Champion	Date	Event	Location	Reign	Days	Notes	Ref.
Empresa Mexicana de Lucha Libre (EMLL)
1	Yaqui Joe	1933	Live event	N/A	1	N/A		
Championship history is unrecorded from 1933 to 1937.
2	Octavio Gaona	February 6, 1938	Live event	Mexico City	1	208	Defeated Black Guzmán in a tournament final	
3	Firpo Segura	September 2, 1938	Live event	Mexico City	1	N/A		
4	Octavio Gaona	1938/1939	Live event	N/A	2	N/A		
5	Tarzán López	February 9, 1939	Live event	Mexico City	1	823		
6	Black Guzmán	May 12, 1941	Live event	Mexico City	1	218		
—	Vacated	December 16, 1941	—	—	—	—	Championship vacated after Guzman won the NWA World Middleweight Championship, defeating Tarzán López in Mexico City	
7	Murciélago Velázquez	May 24, 1942	Live event	Mexico City	1	299	Defeated Octavio Gaona to win the championship	
8	El Santo	March 19, 1943	Live event	Mexico City	1	84		
9	Bobby Bonales	June 11, 1943	Live event	Mexico City	1	119		
10	El Santo	October 8, 1943	Live event	Mexico City	2	176		
11	Tarzán López	April 1, 1944	Live event	Mexico City	2	7		
—	Vacated	April 8, 1944	—	—	—	—	Vacated the championship as he already held the NWA World Middleweight Championship	
12	El Santo	May 31, 1944	Live event	Mexico City	3	366	Defeated Tuffy Truesdale to win the vacant championship	
13	Bobby Bonales	June 1, 1945	Live event	Mexico City	2	116		
14	Gory Guerrero	September 25, 1945	EMLL 12th Anniversary Show	Mexico City	1	151		
—	Vacated	February 23, 1946	—	—	—	—	Championship vacated after Guerrero won the NWA World Middleweight Championship	
15	Tarzán López	April 12, 1946	Live event	N/A	3	1,142		
—	Vacated	May 28, 1949	—	—	—	—	López won the NWA World Middleweight Championship	
16	El Santo	September 14, 1956	Live event	Mexico City	4	2,400	Defeated El Gladiador in a tournament final	
17	Karloff Lagarde	April 11, 1963	Live event	Pachuca	1	78	Won a tournament for the vacant championship	
18	El Santo	June 28, 1963	Live event	Mexico City	5	1,453		
19	René Guajardo	June 20, 1967	Live event	Mexico City	1	39		
—	Vacated	July 29, 1967	—	—	—	—		
20	Karloff Lagarde	December 15, 1967	Live event	Mexico City	2	72		
21	Humberto Gárza	February 25, 1968	Live event	Monterrey, Nuevo León	2	238		
22	Alberto Muñoz	October 20, 1968	Live event	Guadalajara, Jalisco	1	396		
23	Rene Guajardo	November 20, 1969	Live event	Aguascalientes, Aguascalientes	2	174		
24	Humberto Gárza	May 13, 1970	Live event	Monterrey, Nuevo León	2	328		
25	Ciclón Veloz Jr.	April 6, 1971	Live event	Monterrey, Nuevo León	1	983		
26	Adorable Rubí	December 14, 1973	Live event	Mexico City	1	196		
27	Aníbal	June 28, 1974	Live event	Mexico City	1	84		
—	Vacated	September 20, 1974	—	—	—	—	Anibal won the NWA World Middleweight Championship	
28	Ringo Mendoza	November 29, 1974	Live event	Mexico City	1	812	Won a tournament for the vacant championship	
29	Perro Aguayo	February 18, 1977	Live event	Mexico City	1	21		
—	Vacated	March 11, 1977	—	—	—	—	Championship vacated after Perro Aguayo won the NWA World Middleweight Championship, defeating El Faraón in Mexico City	
30	José Luis Mendieta	April 15, 1977	Live event	Mexico City	1	218		
31	Sangre Chicana	November 19, 1977	Live event	Mexico City	1	467-497		
—	Vacated	March 1979	—	—	—	—	Championship vacated for undocumented reasons	
32	Cachorro Mendoza	June 8, 1979	Live event	Mexico City	1	133		
33	El Satánico	October 19, 1979	Live event	Mexico City	1	231		
34	Ringo Mendoza	June 6, 1980	Live event	Mexico City	2	182		
35	El Faraón	December 5, 1980	Live event	Mexico City	1	117+		
—	Vacated	April 1981	—	—	—	—	Championship vacated due to El Faraon making an unauthorized defence	
36	El Solar	May 29, 1981	Live event	Mexico City	1	147	Defeated Cachorro Mendoza	
37	El Satánico	October 23, 1981	Live event	Mexico City	2	119		
38	Lizmark	February 19, 1982	Live event	Mexico City	1	377		
39	Espectro Jr. (II)	March 3, 1983	Live event	Cuernavaca, Morelos	1	86		
40	Lizmark	May 28, 1983	Live event	Puebla, Puebla	2	6		
—	Vacated	June 3, 1983	—	—	—	—	Championship vacated when Lizmark won the NWA World Middleweight Championship	
41	Ultraman	August 12, 1983	Live event	Mexico City	1	205	Defeated Águila Solitaria in a tournament final	
42	Jerry Estrada	March 4, 1984	Live event	Mexico City	1	271		
43	Atlantis	November 30, 1984	Live event	Mexico City	1	457		
44	El Talismán	March 2, 1986	Live event	Mexico City	1	273		
45	Mogur	November 30, 1986	Live event	Mexico City	1	427		
46	El Satánico	January 31, 1988	Live event	Mexico City	3	216		
47	El Dandy	September 3, 1988	Live event	Mexico City	1	875		
48	Javier Cruz	July 26, 1990	Live event	Cuernavaca, Morelos	1	35		
49	Emilio Charles Jr.	August 30, 1990	Live event	Cuernavaca, Morelos	1	82		
50	Octagón	November 20, 1990	Live event	Mexico City	1	612		
Asistencia Asesoría y Administración (AAA)
51	Blue Panther	July 24, 1992	Live event	León, Guanajuato	1	665		
52	Octagón	April 30, 1994	AAA Show	Veracruz, Veracruz	2	27		
53	Blue Panther	May 27, 1994	AAA Show	Tijuana, Baja California	2	609	Awarded the title by default when Octagón was unable to defend it because of injury	
54	El Hijo del Santo	January 26, 1996	AAA Show	Tijuana, Baja California	1	233		
55	Fuerza Guerrera	September 15, 1996	AAA Show	Saltillo, Coahuila	1	867		
56	Octagón	January 29, 1997	AAA Show	Naucalpan, State of Mexico	3	58		
57	Pentagón (II)	March 28, 1997	AAA Show	Nezahualcóyotl, State of Mexico	1	417		
58	Abismo Negro	May 19, 1998	AAA Show	Tlalnepantla de Baz	1	253		
59	Espectro Jr. (II)	January 27, 1999	AAA Show	Ecatepec de Morelos, State of Mexico	2	141		
60	Máscara Sagrada Jr.	June 17, 1999	AAA Show	Toluca, State of Mexico	1	21		
61	Espectro Jr. (II)	July 8, 1999	AAA Show	Toluca, State of Mexico	3	659		
62	Pimpinela Escarlata	April 27, 2001	AAA Show	Querétaro, Querétaro	1	473		
63	Psicosis II	August 13, 2002	AAA Show	Huamantla, Tlaxcala	1	1,086		
—	Vacated	August 3, 2005	—	—	—	—	Psicosis was stripped of the title for defending the title in a hardcore match against Histeria.	
64	Zumbido	January 29, 2006	AAA Show	Salamanca, Guanajuato	1	167	Defeated Histeria in a tournament final to win the championship.	
65	Octagón	July 15, 2006	AAA Show	Torreón, Coahuila	4	877		
—	Deactivated	December 8, 2008	—	—	—	—	AAA stopped using all of the Mexican National championships around this time, focusing on AAA-branded championships instead.	
Consejo Mundial de Lucha Libre (CMLL)
66	Templario	September 24, 2021	Aniversario 88	Mexico City	1	600	In 2021, CMLL (formerly Empresa Mexicana de Lucha Libre; EMLL) reactivated the title. Templario defeated Dragón Rojo Jr. to win the vacant title.	
—	Vacated	May 17, 2023	—	—	—	—	The championship vacated after Templario won the CMLL World Middleweight Championship.	
67	Guerrero Maya Jr.	June 2, 2023	Super Viernes	Mexico City	1	1,211	Defeated Rugido to win the vacant title.	
67	Rey Pegasus	September 25, 2026	Noche de Campeones	Mexico City	1	47+		

== List of championship reigns by combined length ==
Symbol	Meaning
†	Indicates the current champion
¤	The exact length of at least one title reign is uncertain, so the shortest possible length is used.
+	Indicates that the number of days held by this individual changes every day.

Rank	Wrestler	# Of Reigns	Combined Days
1	El Santo	5	4,479
2	Tarzán López	3	1,972
3	Octagón	4	1,574
4	Blue Panther	2	1,274
5	Guerrero Maya Jr.	1	1,211
6	Psicosis II	1	1,086
7	Ringo Mendoza	2	994
8	Ciclón Veloz Jr.	1	983
9	Espectro Jr. II	3	886
10	El Dandy	1	875
11	Fuerza Guerrera	1	867
12	Templario	1	600
13	Satánico	3	566
13	Humberto Gárza	2	566
15	Pimpinela Escarlata	1	473
16	Sangre Chicana	1	467 ¤
17	Atlantis	1	457
18	Mogur	1	427
19	Pentagón II	1	417
20	Alberto Muñoz	1	396
21	Lizmark	2	383
22	Murciélago Velázquez	1	299
23	Talismán	1	273
24	Jerry Estrada	1	271
25	Abismo Negro	1	253
26	Bobby Bonales	2	235
27	El Hijo del Santo	1	233
28	José Luis Mendieta	1	218
28	Black Guzmán	1	218
30	René Guajardo	2	213
31	Octavio Gaona	2	208 ¤
32	Ultraman	1	205
33	Adorable Rubí	1	196
34	Zumbido	1	167
35	Gory Guerrero	1	151
36	Karloff Lagarde	2	150
37	El Solar	1	147
38	Cachorro Mendoza	1	133
39	El Faraon	1	117¤
40	Aníbal	1	84
41	Emilio Charles Jr.	1	82
42	Javier Cruz	1	35
43	Máscara Sagrada Jr.	1	21
43	Perro Aguayo	1	21
45	Rey Pegasus†	1	47+
46	Firpo Segura	1	?
46	Yaqui Joe	1	?

== Championship tournaments ==
=== 1977 ===
Perro Aguayo won the NWA World Middleweight Championship on March 11, 1977, while being the reigning Mexican National Middleweight Champion. As a result, Aguayo relinquished the Mexican National title so that the EMLL could hold an eight-man tournament to determine the next champion. The first round was held on March 25, the semi-finals on April 8 and the tournament's finals on April 15. In the finals, Jose Luis Mendieta defeated Rubí Ruvalcaba to win the championship.

March 25
1	Demonio Blanco	W
8	As Charro
4	Jose Luis Mendieta	W
5	Spirit
2	Rubí Ruvalcaba	W
7	Tony Salazar
3	El Faraón	W
6	Ringo Mendoza

April 8
Demonio Blanco
Jose Luis Mendieta	W
Rubí Ruvalcaba	W
El Faraón

April 15
Jose Luis Mendieta	W
Rubí Ruvalcaba

=== 2005–2006 ===
The tournament ran from October 14, 2005 – January 9, 2006. Records are unclear as to who Histeria and Psicosis II defeated to qualify for the semifinals. The tournament winner was Zumbido.

Tournament bracket

1st Round
Sin Limite (October 14, 2005)
El Ángel	Win
Gran Apache	—
Sin Limite (October 20, 2005)
El Hijo del Fantasma	—
Hator	Win
Sin Limite (November 12, 2005)
Audaz Jr.	—
Charly Manson	Win
Sin Limite (November 7, 2005)
El Oriental	—
Zumbido	Win

Quarterfinals
Sin Limite (November 19, 2005)
El Ángel	—
El Hijo del Fantasma	Win
AAA (November 25, 2005)
Charly Manson	—
Zumbido	Win

Semifinals
Sin Limite (December 17, 2005)
El Hijo del Fantasma	11:08
Zumbido	Countout
Sin Limite (January 19, 2006)
Histeria	Win
Psicosis II	11:14

Final (Note: This was a 2-out-of-3 Falls match.)
Sin Limite (January 29, 2006)
Zumbido	5:39	Pinfall	Pinfall
Histeria	Pinfall	7:46	14:46

=== 2023 ===
Templario won the CMLL World Middleweight Championship on May 12, 2023, while being the reigning Mexican National Middleweight Champion. As a result, Templario relinquished the Mexican National title so that the CMLL could hold an eight-man tournament to determine the next champion. The first round and semi-finals were held on May 26, and the tournament's finals on June 2. In the finals, Guerrero Maya Jr. defeated Rugido to win the championship.

May 26
1	Guerrero Maya Jr.	W
8	Audaz
4	Zandokan Jr.	W
5	Rey Samuray
2	Hombre Bala Jr.	W
7	El Felino
3	Rugido	W
6	El Coyote

May 26
Guerrero Maya Jr.	W
Zandokan Jr.
Hombre Bala Jr.
Rugido	W

June 2
Guerrero Maya Jr.	W
Rugido
