= Mocho Cota =

Mexican professional wrestler (1954 – 2016)

Personal information
- Born: Manuel Cota Soto; June 5, 1954 Municipio del Fuerte, Sinaloa, Mexico
- Died: December 22, 2016 (aged 62)

Professional wrestling career
- Ring name: Mocho Cota
- Billed height: 1.71 m (5 ft 7 1/2 in)
- Billed weight: 84 kg (185 lb)
- Trained by: Releves López
- Debut: 1979
- Retired: 2007

Manuel Cota Soto (June 5, 1954 – December 22, 2016) was a Mexican professional wrestler best known under the ring name Mocho Cota. "Mocho" is Spanish for "mutilated", and Cota had lost two fingers. In his career, which began in 1979, he held both the Mexican National Welterweight Championship and the NWA World Welterweight Championship. He worked mainly for Empresa Mexicana de Lucha Libre / Consejo Mundial de Lucha Libre (EMLL / CMLL) throughout his career.

== Professional wrestling career ==
Manuel Cota made his professional wrestling debut in 1979, choosing to wrestle under the ring name "Mocho Cota", a name he would use for his entire career. On November 12, 1982, he won the Empresa Mexicana de Lucha Libre (EMLL) promoted Mexican National Welterweight Championship by defeating Talismán. The title change set off a long running storyline feud between them that saw both men win Luchas de Apuestas against each other, seeing their opponents shaved bald after the matches. Cota's Mexican Welterweight title reign lasted for 265 days until he lost to Chamaco Valaguez on August 4, 1983. On January 27, 1984, he defeated Américo Rocca to win the NWA World Welterweight Championship. He lost the title to Valaguez on July 26, 1984. He died on December 22, 2016, aged 62.

== Personal life ==
According to his son, "Mocho" earned his nickname by being amputated, losing two fingers and the top of another one, after an accident at a "Maquiladora" (a textile plant) working with a chopper before becoming a full-time wrestler. His brother wrestles as Guero Cota. One of his sons has become an established name of the Mexican Wrestling Company AAA taking up his famous father's name "Mocho Cota Jr." In February 2018, he and two partners: "Tito Santana (formerly known as Soul Rocker") and "Carta Brava Jr." known as "Poder del Norte" became champions of "Tercias (three wrestlers) of AAA.

== Championships and accomplishments ==
- Empresa Mexicana de Lucha Libre
  - Mexican National Welterweight Championship (1 time)
  - NWA World Welterweight Championship (1 time)

== Luchas de Apuestas record ==
Winner (wager)	Loser (wager)	Location	Event	Date	Notes
Mocho Cota (hair)	Chamaco Valaguez (hair)	Cuernavaca, Morelos	Live event	N/A	
El Satánico (hair)	Mocho Cota (hair)	Mexico City	EMLL 47th Anniversary Show	September 26, 1980	
Cachorro Mendoza (hair)	Mocho Cota (hair)	Mexico City	EMLL 48th Anniversary Show	September 18, 1981	
Chamaco Valaguez (hair)	Mocho Cota (hair)	Cuernavaca, Morelos	Live event	July 29, 1982	
Gran Cochisse (hair)	Mocho Cota (hair)	Mexico City	Live event	March 25, 1983	
La Fiera and Mocho Cota (hair)	Ringo and Cachorro Mendoza (hair)	Mexico City	Live event	July 1, 1983	
Gran Cochisse (hair)	Mocho Cota (hair)	Mexico City	Live event	September 9, 1983	
Mocho Cota (hair)	Chamaco Valaguez (hair)	Mexico City	Live event	September 7, 1984	
Mocho Cota (hair)	El Talismán (hair)	Mexico City	Live event	March 7, 1986	
Sangre Chicana and Mocho Cota (hair)	El Faraón and Talismán (hair)	Mexico City	Live event	March 7, 1986	
Mocho Cota (hair)	Kato Kung Lee (hair)	Mexico City	Live event	December 10, 1993	
Mocho Cota (hair)	Chamaco Valaguez (hair)	Cuernavaca, Morelos	Live event	March 29, 1994	
Negro Casas (hair)	Mocho Cota (hair)	Mexico City	Live event	September 23, 1994	
