= Ringo Mendoza =

Mexican professional wrestler

Personal information
- Born: Genaro Jacobo Contreras; September 19, 1949 (age 77) Mezcala de la Asunción, Jalisco, Mexico
- Relatives: Cachorro Mendoza (brother); Indio Mendoza (wrestler); Freddy Mendoza (wrestler)

Professional wrestling career
- Ring name: Ringo Mendoza
- Billed height: 1.70 m (5 ft 7 in)
- Billed weight: 92 kg (203 lb)
- Billed from: Mezcala de la Asunción, Jalisco, Mexico
- Trained by: Diablo Velazco
- Debut: December 3, 1968
- Retired: 2011

Genaro Jacobo Contreras (born September 19, 1949), better known by his ring name Ringo Mendoza, is a Mexican professional wrestling trainer and retired professional wrestler for Consejo Mundial de Lucha Libre (CMLL). Mendoza wrestled his last match in 2011, transitioning to being a full-time trainer instead.

Over the course of his career, Ringo Mendoza held several Middleweight championships, including the NWA World Middleweight Championship five times, Mexican National Middleweight Championship twice, the CMLL World Middleweight Championship, the Occidente Middleweight Championship and the UWA World Junior Light Heavyweight Championship. He also held the Mexican National Tag Team Championship with his brother Chachorro, and the Mexican National Trios Championship with Kiss and Rayo de Jalisco Jr. He also won the Salvador Lutteroth Tag Tournament in 1999 with Super Astro. Mendoza has three brothers who were also professional wrestlers, Cachorro Mendoza ("Cub Mendoza"), Indio Mendoza and Freddy Mendoza.

== Professional wrestling career ==
Genaro Contreras made his professional wrestling debut in 1968, after training under renowned Mexican professional wrestling trainer Diablo Velazco, under the ring name "Ringo Mendoza", adopting a Native American persona complete with feathered headdress. Contreras would later be joined by his brothers who wrestled as Cachorro Mendoza and Indio Mendoza. Mendoza won his first wrestling championship on November 29, 1974, when he defeated Aníbal to win the Mexican National Middleweight Championship. Mendoza went on to hold the title for 822 days, over two years, before losing the title to Perro Aguayo on February 28, 1977. During the 822-day reign Ringo Mendoza defended the title against opponents such as Tony Salazar and Perro Aguayo. On July 3, 1977, Mendoza got a measure of revenge for his title loss as he defeated Perro Aguayo to win the NWA World Middleweight Championship, capturing the top title in this middleweight division. Mendoza would become synonymous with the NWA Middleweight Title as he captured it five times between 1977 and 1981 defeating such wrestlers as El Faraón, Perro Aguayo, Tony Salazar, and Sangre Chicana. On June 6, 1980, Mendoza defeated Satánico to win his second Mexican National Middleweight Championship, holding it for 182 days before dropping it to El Faraón. In the 1980s Mendoza began teaming more regularly with his brother Cachorro Mendoza, defeating Satánico and Espectro Jr. in a tournament final to win the vacant Mexican National Tag Team Championship.

On January 15, 1983, Mendoza became a double champion as he defeated El Faraón to win the NWA World Light Heavyweight Championship. On July 28, 1983, Mendoza lost the championship to Satánico, but quickly regained it. The Mendozas held the tag team title for a full 1,029 days before losing to Sangre Chicana and Cien Caras on April 12, 1985. A month later Mendoza lost the NWA World Light Heavyweight title to MS-1 on February 13, 1985. On November 28, 1986, Mendoza teamed up with Rayo de Jalisco Jr. and Kiss to defeat Los Brazos (El Brazo, Brazo de Oro, and Brazo de Plata) to win the Mexican National Trios Championship. The team held the title for 275 days before being defeated by Hombre Bala, Jerry Estrada, and Pirata Morgan on August 30, 1987. In the late 1980s Ringo Mendoza began working for the Universal Wrestling Association (UWA) where he defeated Gran Cochisse to win the UWA World Junior Light Heavyweight Championship on April 29, 1989. Over a year later, on June 29, 1990, he lost the UWA title to long-time rival Perro Aguayo. From the early 1990s on Ringo Mendoza began focusing part of his time on training wrestlers, mainly working with young wrestlers on Consejo Mundial de Lucha Libre (CMLL)'s roster. Mendoza's last wrestling related highlight came on March 7, 1999 when he defeated Emilio Charles Jr. to win the CMLL World Middleweight Championship, making him one of a very few wrestlers to have won the Mexican, NWA World and CMLL World Middleweight championships to date. Mendoza defended the championship on at least 10 occasions over the 742 days his reign lasted, defeating wrestlers such as Blue Panther, Scorpio Jr., Rey Bucanero, Zumbido, Apolo Dantés, Black Warrior, Villano III and Mano Negra before losing the title back to Emilio Charles on March 18, 2001. Since losing the title Mendoza has focused on training wrestlers at CMLL's Mexico City and Guadalajara, Jalisco based wrestling schools. In 2011 Mendoza wrestled his last match.

== Championships and accomplishments ==
- Empresa Mexicana de Lucha Libre / Consejo Mundial de Lucha Libre
  - CMLL World Middleweight Championship (1 time)
  - Mexican National Middleweight Championship (1 time)
  - Mexican National Tag Team Championship (1 time) – with Cachorro Mendoza
  - Mexican National Trios Championship (1 time) – with Kiss and Rayo de Jalisco Jr.
  - NWA World Light Heavyweight Championship (2 times)
  - NWA World Middleweight Championship (5 times)
  - Salvador Lutteroth Tag Tournament – with Super Astro
  - Mexican National Tag Team Tournament (1982) - with Cachorro Mendoza
  - Occidente Middleweight Championship (1 time)
  - Homenaje a Dos Leyendas honoree (2022)
- Universal Wrestling Association
  - UWA World Junior Light Heavyweight Championship (1 time)

== Luchas de Apuestas record ==
Winner (wager)	Loser (wager)	Location	Event	Date	Notes
Luis Mariscal (hair)	Ringo Mendoza (hair)	N/A	Live event	N/A	
Ringo Mendoza (hair)	Asesino Negro (hair)	Mexico City	Live event	N/A	
Ringo Mendoza (hair)	Black Killer (hair)	Guadalajara, Jalisco	Live event	N/A	
Ringo Mendoza (hair)	Brazo de Oro (hair)	N/A	Live event	N/A	
Ringo Mendoza (hair)	Brazo de Plata (hair)	N/A	Live event	N/A	
Ringo Mendoza (hair)	Bruno Estrada (hair)	N/A	Live event	N/A	
Ringo Mendoza (hair)	Bruno Victoria (hair)	N/A	Live event	N/A	
Ringo Mendoza (hair)	Coloso Colosetti (hair)	N/A	Live event	N/A	
Ringo Mendoza (hair)	El Brazo (hair)	N/A	Live event	N/A	
Ringo Mendoza (hair)	El Nazi (hair)	N/A	Live event	N/A	
Ringo Mendoza (hair)	Espanto II (hair)	N/A	Live event	N/A	
Ringo Mendoza (hair)	Espanto III (hair)	N/A	Live event	N/A	
Ringo Mendoza (hair)	Pérez Mosqueda (hair)	N/A	Live event	N/A	
Ringo Mendoza (hair)	El Satánico (hair)	N/A	Live event	N/A	
Ringo Mendoza (hair)	Vick Amezcua (hair)	N/A	Live event	N/A	
Idolo (hair)	Ringo Mendoza (hair)	Guadalajara, Jalisco	Live event	1970s	
Ray and Ringo Mendoza (hair)	Ángel Blanco and Kim Chul Won (hair)	Mexico City	EMLL 40th Anniversary Show	September 21, 1973	
Gemelo Diablo II (hair)	Ringo Mendoza (hair)	Mexico City	Live event	1975	
Perro Aguayo (hair)	Ringo Mendoza (hair)	Mexico City	Live event	May 25, 1975	
Ringo Mendoza (hair)	Perro Aguayo (hair)	Guadalajara, Jalisco	Live event	May 26, 1976	
Ringo Mendoza and Carlos Plata (hair)	Los Gemelos Diablo (hair)	Mexico City	Live event	June 11, 1976	
El Faraón and Ringo Mendoza (hair)	Perro Aguayo and Joe Polardi (hair)	Mexico City	Live event	December 9, 1977	
El Faraón and Ringo Mendoza (hair)	Sangre Chicana and Alfonso Dantés (hair)	Mexico City	22. Aniversario de Arena México	April 22, 1978	22. Aniversario de Arena México
Ringo and Cachorro Mendoza (hair)	Adorable Rubí and Divino Roy (hair)	Mexico City	Live event	June 22, 1979	
El Faraón and Ringo Mendoza (hair)	El Nazi and Adorable Rubí (hair)	Mexico City	24. Aniversario de Arena México	April 7, 1980	
El Faraón and Ringo Mendoza (hair)	Tony Benetto and Herodes (hair)	Mexico City	Live event	June 27, 1980	
Ringo Mendoza (hair)	El Faraón (hair)	Mexico City	Live event	December 4, 1981	
Sangre Chicana and El Satánico (hair)	Ringo and Cachorro Mendoza (hair)	N/A	Live event	May 1982	
Ringo Mendoza, César Curiel and Rey Salomón (hair)	Tony Benetto, Herodes and Adorable Rubí (hair)	Mexico City	Live event	December 10, 1982	
La Fiera and Mocho Cota (hair)	Ringo and Cachorro Mendoza (hair)	Mexico City	Live event	July 1, 1983	
Ringo Mendoza (hair)	Tony Benetto (hair)	Mexico City	Live event	September 1984	
Ringo Mendoza, Américo Rocca and Tony Salazar (hair)	Los Misioneros de la Muerte (hair) (El Signo, El Texano and Negro Navarro)	Mexico City	EMLL 53rd Anniversary Show	September 19, 1986	
Ringo Mendoza (hair)	El Macho (hair)	Mexico City	Live event	July 2, 1988	
Ringo Mendoza (hair)	Scorpio (hair)	Mexico City	Live event	August 17, 1990	
El Faraón and Ringo Mendoza (hair)	MS-1 and Masakre (hair)	Mexico City	Live event	September 7, 1990	
Ringo Mendoza (hair)	Fabuloso Blondy (hair)	Mexico City	Live event	November 30, 1990	
Ringo Mendoza (hair)	Luis Mariscal (hair)	Mezcala	Live event	January 6, 1991	
Perro Aguayo and Ringo Mendoza (hair)	The Texas Rangers (masks)	Mexico City	Live event	March 3, 1991	
Ringo Mendoza (hair)	Ranger (hair)	Mexico City	Live event	March 10, 1991	
Bestia Salvaje (hair)	Ringo Mendoza (hair)	Mexico City	Live event	August 16, 1992	
Javier Cruz (hair)	Ringo Mendoza (hair)	Mexico City	Live event	March 2, 1993	(Note: The match also included Mogur.)
Ringo Mendoza (hair)	Luis Mariscal (hair)	Naucalpan, State of Mexico	Live event	December 8, 1993	
Ringo Mendoza (hair)	Hombre Bala (hair)	Mexico City	Live event	December 15, 1994	
Américo Rocca (hair)	Ringo Mendoza (hair)	Mexico City	Live event	February 16, 1996	
Ringo Mendoza and Tajiri (hair)	Chicago Express and Mogur (hair)	Mexico City	Live event	June 14, 1998	
Ringo Mendoza (hair)	El Signo (hair)	Mexico City	Live event	September 6, 1998	
Ringo Mendoza and Campesino del Valle (hair)	Indio Loco and El Mohicano I (hair)	Xochimilco, Mexico City	Live event	September 9, 2000	
Emilio Charles Jr. (hair)	Ringo Mendoza (hair)	Mexico City	Live event	April 15, 2001	
Ringo Mendoza (hair)	Guerrero Del Futuro (hair)	Mexico City	Live event	October 19, 2003	
Ringo Mendoza (hair)	Mohicano I (hair)	Cholula, Puebla	Live event	May 27, 2006	
