= Arturo Beristain =

Mexican professional wrestler

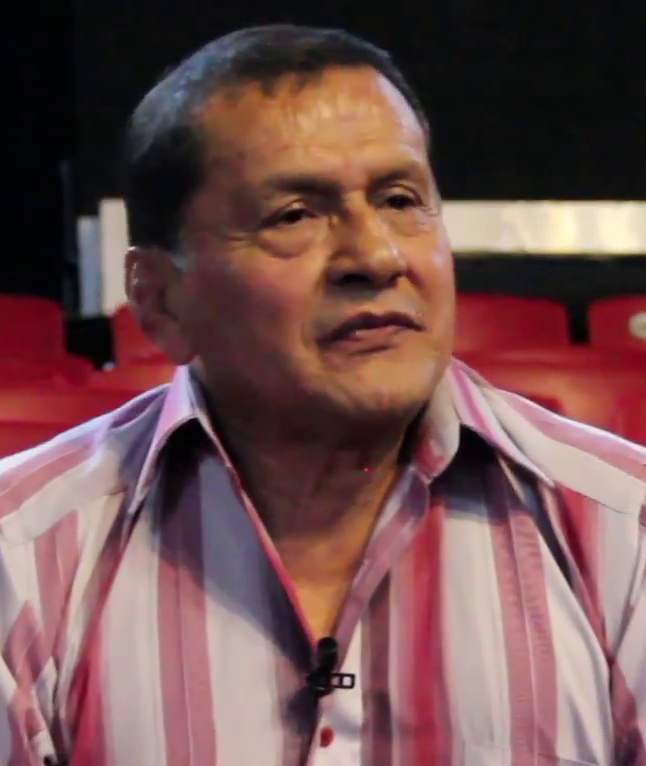
- Beristain during an interview in 2017

Personal information
- Born: Arturo Beristain; September 5, 1949 (age 76) Monterrey, Nuevo León, Mexico

Professional wrestling career
- Ring name(s): Filoso (I); Hijo del Gladiador; Santiago Ayala; Talismán
- Billed height: 1.71 m (5 ft 7 1/2 in)
- Billed weight: 87 kg (192 lb)
- Billed from: Mexico City, Mexico
- Trained by: Pedro Nieves; Rolando Vera; Rafael Salamanca
- Debut: January 1971
- Retired: 2005

Arturo Beristain (born September 5, 1949) is a Mexican retired professional wrestler who works as a wrestling trainer at the gym of the promotion Consejo Mundial de Lucha Libre (CMLL) in Mexico City, Mexico. Beristain is best known for working under two different ring names, Talismán and El Hijo del Gladiador; both personas started out as masked, and Beristain lost both masks in Luchas de Apuestas. He lost the Talismán mask to Atlantis in 1984 and the Hijo del Gladiador mask to Rencor Latino in 2000. As Talismán, Beristain won the Mexican National Welterweight Championship twice, the Mexican National Middleweight Championship and the Mexican National Lightweight Championship. As el Hijo del Gladiador he has won the CMLL World Trios Championship with Gran Markus, Jr. and Dr. Wagner Jr. and the IWRG Intercontinental Middleweight Championship. When Beristain lost the "Hijo del Gladiador" he was announced as "Arturo Beristain Ramírez" to further the storyline that he was actually the son of wrestler "El Gladiador", but his last name is not actually Ramírez.

== Professional wrestling career ==
Beristain made his professional wrestling debut in 1971 at the age of 21, under the ring name Santiago Ayala. A few years later Beristain adopted a masked ring persona by the name of Talismán. The Talismán character was so successful that Beristain began working for Empresa Mexicana de Lucha Libre (EMLL), Mexico's largest wrestling promotion. On August 30, 1978, Talismán defeated Mario Valenzuela to win the Mexican National Lightweight Championship, his first professional wrestling championship. He held the title for 221 days before losing it to Rodolfo Ruiz on April 8, 1979.

It would be almost two years before Talismán won another title, defeating El Supremo for the Mexican National Welterweight Championship on March 30, 1982. Talismán successfully defended the title several times, including a rematch with the deposed champion, until losing it on November 12, 1982 to Mocho Cota. In 1984 Talismán entered and won a tournament for the vacant Mexican National Welterweight Championship, defeating Américo Rocca in the finals. On September 21, 1984, Talismán lost a Luchas de Apuesta bet match to Atlantis and was forced to unmask after the match and reveal his real name per lucha libre traditions. Talismán held the Welterweight title for 222 days before Rocca finally managed to defeat him. On March 2, 1986, Talismán gained a measure of revenge on Atlantis by defeating him for the Mexican National Middleweight Championship. He successfully defended the title for 273 days before losing it to Mogur on November 30, 1986.

In the late 1980s Beristain switched ring characters, becoming an enmascarado once more, using the name El Hijo del Gladiador (Spanish for "The Son of the Gladiator"), creating a narrative blood relation to deceased wrestler El Gladiador. Hijo del Gladiador teamed up with Dr. Wagner Jr. and Gran Markus Jr. to form the group La Ola Blanca ("The White Wave"), continuing the tradition started by Dr. Wagner (Jr's father) and Ángel Blanco in the 1960s and 1970s. On April 22, 1994, La Ola Blanca defeated Los Brazos (El Brazo, Brazo de Oro and Brazo de Plata) to win the CMLL World Trios Championship (EMLL had been renamed Consejo Mundial de Lucha Libre in 1990). The trio held the title for 343 days before losing the Trios title to Bestia Salvaje, Emilio Charles, Jr. and Sangre Chicana on March 31, 1995. On August 6, 1996, Hijo del Gladiador and Gran Markus, Jr. teamed up to defeat Atlantis and Rayo de Jalisco, Jr. to win the CMLL World Tag Team Championship. The team held the title for 43 days before losing it to Atlantis and Lizmark on September 18, 1996.

After the loss of the tag team title, La Ola Blanca broke up, with each wrestler going their separate ways. Due to the CMLL/International Wrestling Revolution Group (IWRG) talent-exchange agreement, Hijo del Gladiador began working for IWRG in late 1997, and in early 1998 he defeated El Pantera to win the IWRG Intercontinental Middleweight Championship. He defended it several times in the following 186 days before losing the title to Magnum Tokyo on July 5, 1998. On August 4, 2000, El Hijo del Gladiador was one of the participants in a Torneo cibernetico, where the last man eliminated would be forced to unmask. On that night he was bested by Rencor Latino and forced to unmask as a consequence of his loss. Beristain announced that his full name was "Arturo Beristain Ramírez" to keep up the storyline that he really was the son of El Gladiador. It was later confirmed that his last name was not Ramirez.

Arturo Beristain retired from wrestling in 2005 and became a full-time wrestling trainer for CMLL in their wrestling school in Mexico City, where he still works, training several of CMLL's rookie wrestlers.

== Championships and accomplishments ==
- Consejo Mundial de Lucha Libre
  - CMLL World Tag Team Championship (1 time) – with Gran Markus, Jr.
  - CMLL World Trios Championship (1 time) – with Gran Markus, Jr. and Dr. Wagner Jr.
  - Mexican National Lightweight Championship (1 time)
  - Mexican National Middleweight Championship (1 time)
  - Mexican National Welterweight Championship (2 times)
  - Copa Bobby Bonales (2019)
- International Wrestling Revolution Group
  - IWRG Intercontinental Middleweight Championship (1 time)

== Luchas de Apuestas record ==
Winner (wager)	Loser (wager)	Location	Event	Date	Notes
Talismán and Mr. Niebla (Note: This was the 1st version of Mr. Niebla, not the current Mr. Niebla) (mask)	Los Tigres del Ring (mask)	Tijuana, Baja California	Live event	April 1, 1977	
Talismán (mask)	Irazu (hair)	Mexico City	Live event	August 23, 1977	
Talismán (mask)	Tauro (hair)	Mexico City	Live event	April 2, 1978	
Talismán (mask)	Huroki Sito (hair)	Mexico City	Live event	June 23, 1978	
Talismán (mask)	Arisona (mask)	San Luis Potosí, San Luis Potosí	Live event	November 21, 1979	
Talismán (mask)	El Mago (mask)	Mexico City	Live event	October 7, 1980	
Talismán (mask)	El Legendario (mask)	N/A	Live event	December 1980	
Talismán (mask)	Tiburon (mask)	Mexico City	Live event	September 29, 1981	
Atlantis (mask)	Talismán (mask)	Mexico City	EMLL 51st Anniversary Show	September 21, 1984	
Talismán (hair)	Américo Rocca (hair)	Mexico City	Live event	October 26, 1984	
Talismán (hair)	Lemus II (hair)	Mexico City	Live event	June 8, 1985	
Mocho Cota (hair)	Talismán (hair)	Mexico City	Live event	March 7, 1986	
Sangre Chicana and Mocho Cota (hair)	El Faraón and Talismán (hair)	Mexico City	Live event	March 7, 1986	
Los Bravos (Fuerza Guerrera (mask), El Dandy (hair) and Talisman (hair)	Los Destructores (Lemús II (mask), Tony Arce (hair) and Vulcano (hair))	Mexico City	Live event	July 5, 1985	
Los Misioneros de la Muerte (hair) ( El Signo, El Texano and Negro Navarro)	El Dandy, Talismán and Jerry Estrada (hair)	Mexico City	Live event	September 5, 1986	
Américo Rocca (hair)	Talismán (hair)	Mexico City	Live event	1987	
El Hijo del Gladiador (mask)	Sangre Guerrera (mask)	Mexico City	Live event	1988	
Rencor Latino (mask)	El Hijo del Gladiador (mask)	Mexico City	Live event	August 4, 2000	(Note: Lost in the final of a Torneo Cibernetico elimination match.)
Tony Rivera (hair)	El Hijo del Gladiador (hair)	Puebla, Puebla	Live event	February 19, 2001	
Ricky Marvin (hair)	El Hijo del Gladiador (hair)	Mexico City	Live event	October 14, 2001	
Justiciero (hair)	El Hijo del Gladiador (hair)	Coacalco, State of Mexico	Live event	October 19, 2003	
