= El Satánico =

Mexican professional wrestler (born 1949)

Personal information
- Born: Daniel López López; October 26, 1949 (age 76) Guadalajara, Jalisco, Mexico

Professional wrestling career
- Ring names: El Satánico Dr. No; Satánico; El Satánico
- Billed height: 1.74 m (5 ft 9 in)
- Billed weight: 82 kg (181 lb)
- Billed from: Guadalajara, Jalisco, Mexico
- Trained by: Diablo Velasco
- Debut: June 17, 1973
- Retired: March 20, 2026

Daniel López López (born October 26, 1949), best known under the ring name El Satánico (Spanish for "The Satanic"), is a Mexican professional wrestling trainer and retired professional wrestler. He originally wrestled masked until losing his mask a year into his career, performing unmasked from thereon. The majority of his 52-year in-ring career was spent in Consejo Mundial de Lucha Libre (CMLL), where he worked as a rudo (the antagonists, also known as heel in professional wrestling lingo).

El Satánico was a founding member of the Los Infernales ("The Infernals") stable from its creation in the early 1980s through 2008, being a part of every single incarnation of the group. Los Infernales won the CMLL World Trios Championship three times and the Mexican National Trios Championship three times. As a singles competitor, he won the CMLL World Middleweight Championship, the CMLL World Welterweight Championship once, the Mexican National Middleweight Championship three times, the NWA World Light Heavyweight Championship four times, and the NWA World Middleweight Championship.

For years, López worked at the CMLL wrestling school, playing a part in the development of almost every wrestler that worked for CMLL in the 2000s. He later opened his own school independent of CMLL. He wrestled on a reduced schedule on the Mexican independent circuit before his retirement at Homenaje a Dos Leyendas in March 2026.

== Professional wrestling career ==
=== Early career (1973–1986) ===
López made his professional wrestling debut on June 17, 1973, using the name El Satánico Dr. No ("The Satanic Dr. No"), named after the James Bond movie villain Dr. No; it was then shortened to just "El Satánico". He originally wrestled under a mask, but lost it to El Vengador in a Lucha de Apuestas ("bet match") on January 4, 1974. On October 19, 1979, El Satánico won his first professional wrestling championship, defeating Cachorro Mendoza for the Mexican National Middleweight Championship. Although his first reign lasted 161 days, Satánico eventually held the title twice more from 1981 to 1982 and 1988 to 1989. On March 28, 1980, Satánico defeated Satoru Sayama to win the NWA World Middleweight Championship. His first reign lasted just 30 days, but he would hold the title a further two times between 1982 and 1983 by defeating César Curiel and El Jalisco, before losing it for the third and final time to Lizmark on June 3, 1986. The following month, Satánico defeated Ringo Mendoza to win his first NWA World Light Heavyweight Championship, moving from the middleweight division to the light heavyweight division; he held the title for 87 days before Mendoza regained it.

=== Los Infernales (1986–1999) ===
In the early 1980s, the trios concept became very popular in Mexico, prompting EMLL to form the rudo trio Los Infernales ("The Infernals") with Satánico, Espectro Jr. and MS-1. Shortly after, Pirata Morgan replaced Espectro Jr., who was forced to retire from wrestling due to injuries, as the third member, causing the most successful incarnation of Los Infernales. Satánico split his time between trios matches and wrestling in the middleweight division, defeating Lizmark to start his fourth reign on December 2, 1983. By the middle of 1984, he became involved in a long and heated feud with Gran Cochisse, with both men trading the title back and forth. In March 1985, Los Infernales defeated Los Brazos ("The Arms"; Brazo de Oro, Brazo de Plata and El Brazo) in a tournament final to become the inaugural Mexican National Trios Champions. After Morgan left the group to form "Los Bucaneros" in October 1986, Los Infernales recruited Masakre as their third member. While MS-1 and Masakre worked as a tag team, Satánico focused more on singles competition, causing Los Infernales to make fewer appearances as a trio.

During this time period, Satánico won his third Mexican National Middleweight Championship, as well as his second and third NWA World Light Heavyweight Championship. He was also embroiled in a long feud with Morgan, who won the latter title from Satánico on October 21, 1989. By the early 1990s, Satánico, MS-1 and Morgan reunited as Los Infernales reformed. They won a tournament final to crown the inaugural CMLL World Trios Champions, again defeating Los Brazos on November 22, 1991. Former Infernales member Masakre had formed his own group, Los Intocables ("The Untouchables"; himself, Jaque Mate and Pierroth Jr.), leading to a rudos vs. rudos storyline against Los Infernales. On March 22, 1992, Los Intocables won the trios championship, only for Los Infernales to receive the final victory in their feud, defeating Los Intocables for it on September 20. On April 5, Satánico defeated longtime rival Lizmark to win his fourth and final NWA World Light Heavyweight Championship, before losing it after 111 days to Apolo Dantés.

In 1994, Satánico defeated Dantés for the CMLL World Middleweight Championship, becoming one of the few people to have held both the Mexican National, NWA and CMLL world championships in the middleweight division. Satánico held the title for a total of 1,561 days, by far the longest reign of any CMLL World Middleweight Champion. On March 21, 1997, Satánico won his third CMLL World Trios Championship, this time teaming with Emilio Charles Jr. and Rey Bucanero (Morgan's nephew) to win the vacant titles in a one-night eight-team tournament. After 39 days, the trio lost the title to La Ola Azul ("The Blue Wave"; Atlantis, Lizmark and Mr. Niebla). On June 20, Satánico defeated Frontier Martial-Arts Wrestling (FMW) wrestler Taka Michinoku, who toured Mexico to gain international experience, to win the FMW Independent World Junior Heavyweight Championship. He would hold the title until August 25, as Michinoku won it back shortly before returning to Japan. On March 7, 1999, Satánico's marathon reign as CMLL World Middleweight Champion ended when old rival Ringo Mendoza won the title from him.

=== Los Nuevos Infernales (1999–2009) ===
In the late 1990s, Satánico recruited Bucanero and Último Guerrero to form Los Nuevos Infernales ("The New Infernals"). After working together for just under a year without any title wins, Bucanero and Guerrero turned on Satánico, kicking him out of the group and replacing him with Tarzan Boy. Satánico responded by forming his own "Infernales" with Averno and Mephisto. When Tarzan Boy was injured, Los Nuevos Infernales brought in Máscara Mágica to bolster the group. The storyline between Los Infernales and Los Nuevos Infernales came to a head when the two teams, seven men in total, faced off in a steel cage match where the winners would earn the right to the name "Los Infernales", and the last man in the cage would lose either his mask or hair. On September 28, 2001, in the main event of the CMLL 68th Anniversary Show, Satánico's team won the right to the Infernales name and forced Mágica to unmask. On June 23, 2002, Satánico, Averno and Mephisto defeated Mr. Niebla, Olímpico and Safari to win the Mexican National Trios Championship, which they lost after approximately three months to La Familia de Tijuana (Damián 666, Halloween and Nicho el Millonario). Shortly after, Averno and Mephisto turned on Satánico, forming their own group, La Triada del Terror ("The Trio of Terror"), alongside Ephesto (formerly Safari).

On November 25, 2003, El Satánico defeated El Felino to win the CMLL World Welterweight Championship, which he held until losing it to Mephisto on February 24, 2004. In 2007, Satánico reformed Los Infernales, this time with young wrestlers Euforia and Nosferatu. However, they did not approach the success of the previous incarnations of Los Infernales, working mainly lower to mid-card matches. The following year, Virus became the unofficial leader of Los Nuevos Infernales, as Satánico reduced his actual in-ring work.

=== Later career (2009–2026) ===
In 2009, Satánico announced that he was reducing the number of shows he worked to focus on his work at CMLL's wrestling school. On March 2, 2012, he fought El Solar to a draw in a match for the FLLM Masters Championship, thus El Solar retained the title. On May 18, 2014, Satánico lost a Lucha de Apuestas to El Dandy as part of his retirement tour. After having worked on the independent circuit from 2012 through 2014, Satánico returned to CMLL by the end of 2014, splitting his time between CMLL and appearing on independent shows. On December 6, 2019, Satánico defeated El Solar at Leyendas Mexicanas ("Mexican Legends"), a CMLL show that paid homage to lucha libre legends. In later years, Satánico won the FLLM Masters Championship twice.

On February 11, 2026, it was announced that El Satánico would retire from professional wrestling, with his last match scheduled for Homenaje a Dos Leyendas on March 20, an event dedicated to him. There, Satánico defeated Atlantis and Blue Panther in a three-way elimination match.

== Professional wrestling trainer ==
Daniel López is considered one of the best wrestling trainers active in Mexico, following in the footsteps of his own mentor Diablo Velasco. He is the head trainer of CMLL's wrestling school in Guadalajara, Gimnasio del Diablo Velasco ("Diablo Velasco Gym"), thus being involved in training a lot of the wrestlers CMLL employs, as well as students who have gone on to work for other promotions around the world. The following is a list of notable wrestlers López has trained:

- La Amapola
- Ángel Azteca Jr.
- Ángel de Oro
- Ángel de Plata/Niebla Roja
- Arkangel de la Muerte
- Axel
- Averno
- Bam Bam
- Cancerbero / Mesalla
- Demus 3:16/Pequeño Damián 666
- Dragón Rojo Jr.
- Doctor X
- Eléctrico
- Ephesto
- Esfinge
- Euforia
- Fabián el Gitano
- Guerrero Maya Jr.
- Hooligan /Luciferno
- Horus
- Lady Apache
- Lluvia
- Loco Max
- Marcela
- Máscara Dorada/Gran Metalik
- Misterioso II
- Nitro
- Nosferatu
- Okumura
- Palacio Negro
- Pegasso
- Pequeño Nitro
- Pequeño Violencia
- Princesa Sujey
- Psycho Clown
- Puma King
- Raziel / Caligula
- Rey Cometa
- Rey Escorpión
- El Sagrado
- Semental/Black Taurus
- Sensei
- Silueta
- Soberano Jr.
- La Sombra / Andrade
- Stuka Jr.
- Super Nova
- El Terrible
- Texano Jr.
- Tiger
- Tigre Blanco
- Titán
- Tritón / Rey Tritón
- Trueno
- Valkiria
- Veneno
- Volador Jr.
- Zeuxis

== Championships and accomplishments ==
- Empresa Mexicana de la Lucha Libre / Consejo Mundial de Lucha Libre
  - CMLL World Middleweight Championship (1 time)
  - CMLL World Trios Championship (3 times) – with MS-1 and Pirata Morgan (2), Emilio Charles Jr. and Rey Bucanero (1)
  - CMLL World Welterweight Championship (1 time)
  - Mexican National Middleweight Championship (3 times)
  - Mexican National Trios Championship (3 times) – with MS-1 and Pirata Morgan (2) and Mephisto and Averno (1)
  - NWA World Light Heavyweight Championship (4 times)
  - NWA World Middleweight Championship (5 times)
  - Copa de Arena Mexico (1999) - with Rey Bucanero and Último Guerrero
  - Copa Bobby Bonales 2024
  - Homenaje a Dos Leyendas honoree (2026)
- Frontier Martial-Arts Wrestling
  - FMW Independent World Junior Heavyweight Championship (1 time)
- International Wrestling Revolution Group
  - Copa Higher Power (1999) – with Astro Rey Jr., Máscara Mágica, Rey Bucanero and Último Guerrero
- Pro Wrestling Illustrated
  - Ranked No. 74 of the 500 best singles wrestlers in the PWI 500 in 1997
  - Ranked No. 182 of the 500 best singles wrestlers during the PWI Years in 2003
- Universal Wrestling Association
  - UWA World Middleweight Championship (1 time)
- Wrestling Observer Newsletter awards
  - Wrestling Observer Newsletter Hall of Fame (Class of 2001)
- Other
  - FLLM Masters Championship (2 times)

== Luchas de Apuestas record ==
Winner (wager)	Loser (wager)	Location	Event	Date	Notes
El Vengador (mask)	El Satánico (mask)	Guadalajara, Jalisco	independent show	January 4, 1974	
Ringo Mendoza (hair)	El Satánico (hair)	N/A	independent show	N/A	
El Satánico (hair)	Tony Benetto (hair)	N/A	independent show	N/A	
El Satánico (hair)	El Nazi (hair)	N/A	independent show	N/A	
Flama Azul (hair)	El Satánico (hair)	Mexico City	EMLL show	May 20, 1978	
El Satánico (hair)	Ricky Romero (hair)	Mexico City	EMLL show	February 27, 1979	
El Satánico (hair)	Chamaco Ortiz (hair)	Mexico City	EMLL show	May 26, 1979	
Cachorro Mendoza (hair)	El Satánico (hair)	Mexico City	EMLL Martes De Coliseo	August 28, 1979	
El Satánico (hair)	El Reo (hair)	Mexico City	EMLL show	June 29, 1980	
El Satánico (hair)	Cachorro Mendoza (hair)	Mexico City	EMLL show	August 29, 1980	
El Satánico (hair)	Mocho Cota (hair)	Mexico City	EMLL 47th Anniversary Show	September 26, 1980	
El Fantasma (hair)	El Satánico (hair)	Mexico City	EMLL show	October 24, 1980	
Sangre Chicana (hair) and El (hair) Satánico	Ringo Mendoza(hair) and Cachorro Mendoza (hair)	Mexico City	EMLL show	February 1982	
Sangre Chicana (hair)	El Satánico (hair)	Mexico City	EMLL Domingos de Arena Mexico	June 20, 1982	
El Satánico (hair)	Sangre Chicana (hair)	Mexico City	Super Viernes	July 2, 1982	
Draw	Sangre Chicana (hair); El Satánico (hair)	Mexico City	EMLL show	December 10, 1982	(Note: They wrestled to a draw, after which both wrestlers had their hair shaved off.)
El Satánico (hair)	La Fiera (hair)	Mexico City	Super Viernes	September 16, 1983	
El Satánico (hair)	Samurai Shiro (hair)	Mexico City	Super Viernes	July 13, 1984	
El Satánico (hair)	Alfonso Dantés (hair)	Guadalajara, Jalisco	Super Viernes	August 9, 1985	
El Satánico (hair)	Pirata Morgan (hair)	Mexico City	Juicio Final	December 5, 1986	
El Satánico (hair)	El Dandy (hair)	Mexico City	EMLL show	October 1987	
Ell Satánico (hair)	El Texano (hair)	Mexico City	Super Viernes	August 16, 1988	
El Satánico (hair)	Mike Stone (hair)	Mexico City	Super Viernes	March 31, 1989	(Note: Los Infernales (Satánico, MS-1 and Masakre) against Mike Stone, Rick Patterson and Fabuloso Blondy, with the wrestler being pinned losing his hair.)
Fabuloso Blondy (hair)	El Satánico (hair)	Mexico City	EMLL show	April 7, 1989	
Atlantis (mask) and El Satánico (hair)	Tierra Viento y Fuego (mask) and MS-1(hair)	Mexico City	EMLL 56th Anniversary Show	September 22, 1989	
El Satánico (hair)	Jerry Estrada (hair)	Mexico City	Super Viernes	March 23, 1990	
El Dandy (hair)	El Satánico (hair)	Mexico City	1990 Juicio Final	December 14, 1990	
El Satánico (hair)	Kato Kung Lee (hair)	Mexico City	Super Viernes	June 21, 1991	
El Satánico (hair)	El Dandy (hair)	Mexico City	CMLL show	December 6, 1991	
El Dandy (hair)	El Satánico (hair)	Mexico City	CMLL 59th Anniversary Show	September 18, 1992	
El Satánico (hair)	Pirata Morgan (hair)	Texcoco, State of Mexico	AAA Sin Limite	November 26, 1993	
Héctor Garza (hair)	El Satánico (hair)	Mexico City	39. Aniversario de Arena México	April 7, 1995	
Héctor Garza (hair)	El Satánico (hair)	Mexico City	CMLL show	December 15, 1995	
Emilio Charles Jr. (hair)	El Satánico (hair)	Mexico City	CMLL show	March 20, 1998	(Note: The main event of the 1998 Homenaje a Salvador Lutteroth show.)
Negro Casas (hair)	El Satánico (hair)	Puebla, Puebla	CMLL Lunes Arena Puebla	October 19, 1998	
El Satánico (hair)	Brazo de Oro (hair)	Mexico City	Super Viernes	November 29, 1999	
Tarzan Boy (hair)	El Satánico (hair)	Mexico City	Super Viernes	February 25, 2000	
Tarzan Boy (hair)	El Satánico (hair)	Puebla, Puebla	47. Aniversario de Arena Puebla	July 17, 2000	
El Satánico (hair)	Máscara Mágica (mask)	Mexico City	CMLL 68th Anniversary Show	September 28, 2001	(Note: Cage match that also included Tarzan Boy, Rey Bucanero, Último Guerrero, Averno and Mephisto)
El Satánico (hair)	Maniacop (mask)	Puebla, Puebla	49. Aniversario de Arena Puebla	July 29, 2002	
El Satánico (hair)	Damián 666 (hair)	Mexico City	CMLL show	October 25, 2002	
El Satánico and Negro Casas (hair)	La Legion Japonesa (NOSAWA and MASADA) (hair)	Mexico City	CMLL show	May 16, 2003	
El Satánico (hair)	Super Brazo (hair)	Acapulco, Guerrero	independent show	April 9, 2003	
Máscara Año 2000 (hair)	El Satánico (hair)	Mexico City	CMLL Domingos de Coliseo	November 30, 2003	(Note: Cage match that also included Negro Casas and Tarzan Boy.)
El Satánico (hair)	Violencia (hair)	Puebla, Puebla	CMLL Lunes Arena Puebla	August 16, 2004	
Damián 666 (hair)	El Satánico (hair)	Tijuana, Baja California	Live event	October 15, 2004	
Pierroth Jr. (hair)	El Satánico (hair)	Puebla, Puebla	2. Aniversario de Arena Puebla	July 25, 2005	
Emilio Charles Jr. (hair)	El Satánico (hair)	Nezahualcoyotl	independent show	November 26, 2005	
El Dandy (hair)	El Satánico (hair)	Reynosa, Tamaulipas	El Juicio Final	May 18, 2014	
