= Diablo Velasco =

Mexican professional wrestler and trainer

Personal information
- Born: Cuahutémoc Velasco Vargas; April 28, 1919 Guadalajara, Jalisco, Mexico
- Died: June 13, 1999 (aged 80)

Professional wrestling career
- Ring name(s): Telmo Velazco; Diablo Velasco
- Billed from: Guadalajara, Jalisco, Mexico
- Trained by: Raúl Romero
- Debut: 1937
- Retired: 1955

Cuahutémoc Velasco Vargas (April 28, 1919 – June 13, 1999) was a Mexican professional wrestler and trainer under the name Diablo Velasco. Velasco trained many famous Mexican wrestlers, including Gory Guerrero, Raul Armas, Los Hermanos Crucero, Perro Aguayo, Essa Rios, and Mil Máscaras. In 2001, Velasco was inducted into the Wrestling Observer Newsletter Hall of Fame in recognition of his career and extensive influence on lucha libre.

== Professional wrestling career ==
Velasco started his wrestling career in 1937 after having trained for two years under the tutelage of Raul Romero, using the name "Telmo Velazco". Because Velasco did not have the physical size to become a top line wrestler, he was never a main eventer, but because of his skills and tenacity he was a respected mid-card wrestler who could be relied on to put on a good match. In 1942 Velasco decided that his skills would be put to better use training wrestlers than performing in the ring. In 1959 he was made the head trainer of the Arena Coliseo de Guadalajara, one of the biggest wrestling schools in Mexico.

Over the years Velasco trained a number of wrestlers in Lucha Libre. He served for a period as the head trainer at Arena Coliseo, where he reportedly required students to reach a certain level of skill before he allowed them to graduate. According to accounts of his career, Velasco continued to oversee and mentor wrestlers at his gym after a hip injury prevented him from training in the ring himself.

Velasco continued to run his wrestling school until he retired in 1997 at the age of 78, and died in 1999.

== Championships and accomplishments ==
- Mexico
  - Occidente Welterweight Championship (1 time)
- Wrestling Observer Newsletter
  - Wrestling Observer Newsletter Hall of Fame (Class of 2001)
