= 1966 in professional wrestling =

1966 in professional wrestling describes the year's events in the world of professional wrestling.

== List of notable promotions ==
Only one promotion held notable shows in 1966.

Promotion Name	Abbreviation
Empresa Mexicana de Lucha Libre	EMLL

== Calendar of notable shows ==
Date	Promotion(s)	Event	Location	Main event
April	EMLL	10. Aniversario de Arena México	Mexico City, Mexico	
September 2	EMLL	EMLL 33rd Anniversary Show (1)	Mexico City, Mexico	Jerry London defeated Karloff Lagarde in a best two-out-of-three falls Lucha de Apuesta hair vs. hair match
September 30	EMLL	EMLL 33rd Anniversary Show (2)	Mexico City, Mexico	René Guajardo defeated Jerry London in a best two-out-of-three falls Lucha de Apuesta hair vs. hair match
December 16	EMLL	Juicio Final	Mexico City, Mexico	El Santo vs. Black Shadow in a singles match

== Championship changes ==
=== EMLL ===
NWA World Light Heavyweight Championship
incoming champion – Gory Guerrero
Date	Winner	Event/Show	Note(s)
February 1	Vacated	N/A	Guerrero left the promotion

NWA World Middleweight Championship
incoming champion – René Guajardo
Date	Winner	Event/Show	Note(s)
May 14	Jerry London	EMLL show	
July 1	René Guajardo	EMLL show	

NWA World Welterweight Championship
incoming champion – Karloff Lagarde
No title changes

Mexican National Heavyweight Championship
incoming champion - Chico Casaola
Date	Winner	Event/Show	Note(s)
March 13	Pantera Negra	EMLL show	
September 6	Black Gordman	EMLL show	
November 2	Polo Torres	EMLL show	

Mexican National Middleweight Championship
incoming champion – El Santo
No title changes

Mexican National Lightweight Championship
incoming champion – Alberto Muñoz
Date	Winner	Event/Show	Note(s)
February 6	Vacated	N/A	Championship vacated when Muñoz won the Mexican National Welterweight Championship
April 3	Rolando Costa	EMLL show	
May 1	Raul Rojas	EMLL show	

Mexican National Light Heavyweight Championship
incoming champion – Alfonso Dantés
Date	Winner	Event/Show	Note(s)
February 15	Espanto I	EMLL show	
October 14	El Santo	EMLL show	

Mexican National Welterweight Championship
incoming champion – Huracán Ramírez
Date	Winner	Event/Show	Note(s)
February 6	Alberto Muñoz	EMLL show	

Mexican National Tag Team Championship
incoming champion – Unknown
Date	Winner	Event/Show	Note(s)
April 22	Rayo de Jalisco and El Santo	EMLL show	Defeated Rene Guajardo and Karloff Lagarde in the final of a tournament

Mexican National Women's Championship
incoming champion – Chabela Romero
Date	Winner	Event/Show	Note(s)
May 12	Jarochita Rivero	EMLL show	
August 11	Chabela Romero	EMLL show	

=== NWA ===
NWA Worlds Heavyweight Championship
Incoming Champion – Lou Thesz
Date	Winner	Event/Show	Note(s)
January 7	Gene Kiniski	NWA show	

== Debuts ==
- Debut date uncertain:
  - Leo Burke
  - Tony St. Clair
- January 26 - André the Giant
- February 16 - Carlos Colón
- March 1 - Jumbo Miyamoto (All Japan Women)
- September 16 - Baron Von Raschke
- October 2 - Gran Cochisse
- October 12 - Haruka Eigen
- December - Bobby Duncum Sr.

== Retirements ==
- Paul Lincoln (1951-1966)

== Births ==
- January 3 – Itzuki Yamazaki
- January 4 – La Parka II(died in 2020)
- January 12 – Tariel Bitsadze
- January 13 – Rockin' Rebel(died in 2018)
- January 20 – Haystacks Calhoun Jr.
- January 28 – Tim Patterson (wrestler)
- January 30 – Jeque
- January 31 – Giant González(died in 2010)
- February 10 –Chris Youngblood(died in 2021)
- March 8 – Ursula Hayden (died in 2022)
- March 11 – Robbie Brookside
- March 13 – Akira Nogami
- March 24 – Mitsuhiro Matsunaga
- April 4 – Ulf Herman
- April 6 – Tiffany Million
- April 18 – Todd Pettengill
- April 19 – El Samurai
- April 21 – Crybaby Waldo (died in 2020)
- April 22 – Miguel Pérez Jr.
- April 23 – Bubba the Love Sponge
- May 9 – Brazo Cibernético(died in 1999)
- May 20 – Maniaco
- May 22:
  - Scott Putski
  - David Penzer
- May 26:
  - Tinieblas Jr.
  - Misterioso
- May 28 – Jerrito Estrada
- June 21:
  - Mario Mancini
  - Mancow Muller
- June 28 – Erik Paulson
- June 30 – Mike Tyson
- July 9:
  - Tom Brandi
  - Cannonball Grizzly
- July 10 – Johnny Grunge(died in 2006)
- July 16:
  - Arkángel de la Muerte(died in 2018)
  - Blue Demon Jr.
- July 22 – Shaun Simpson
- August 1 – Mike Chioda
- August 2 – Takashi Iizuka
- August 3 – Butterbean
- August 4 – Kensuke Sasaki
- August 7 – Asya
- August 8 – Miwa Sato
- August 19 – Lilian Garcia
- August 22 – Hardbody Harrison
- August 30 – Scott Stanford
- September 19 – Yoshihiro Takayama
- October 2 – Yokozuna(died in 2000)
- October 5 – Terri Runnels
- October 8 – Art Barr(died in 1994)
- October 21 – Chris Hamrick
- October 25 – Perry Saturn
- October 31 – Koji Kanemoto
- November 2 – Yoshinari Ogawa
- November 10 – Bill DeMott
- November 11 – Scorpio Jr.
- November 13 – Mike Anthony
- November 22 – Ed Ferrara
- November 26 – Brian Lee
- November 29 – John Bradshaw Layfield
- December 2 – Jinsei Shinzaki
- December 8
  - Michael Cole
  - Tyler Mane
- December 12 – Último Dragón
- December 15 – Chocoball Mukai
- December 16 – Mens Teioh
- December 18 – Espectrito(died in 2016)
- December 24 – Jumbo Baretta (died in 2026)
- December 27:
  - Bill Goldberg
  - Jerry Tuite(died in 2003)

== Deaths ==
- March 17 – Don Eagle, 40
- March 30 – Sammy Stein, 60
- May 17 – Randolph Turpin, 37
- August 8 – Ed Lewis 75
- May 25 – Chris Zaharias 52
- August 1 – Jack Spellman, 67
- October 16 – Sándor Szabó 60
- November 10 – Ad Santel 79
- November 15 - Dimitrios Tofalos, 82
