= 1965 in professional wrestling =

1965 in professional wrestling describes the year's events in the world of professional wrestling.

== List of notable promotions ==
Only one promotion held notable shows in 1965.

Promotion Name	Abbreviation
Empresa Mexicana de Lucha Libre	EMLL

== Calendar of notable shows ==
Date	Promotion(s)	Event	Location	Main event
January 13	EMLL	Carnaval de Campeones	Mexico City, Mexico	Raúl Reyes defeated Ray Mendoza (c) in a best two-out-of-three falls for the Mexican National Light Heavyweight Championship
April 3	EMLL	9. Aniversario de Arena México	Mexico City, Mexico	Rizado Ruiz (c) defeated Huracán Ramírez for the Mexican National Welterweight Championship
September 24	EMLL	EMLL 32nd Anniversary Show	Mexico City, Mexico	Karloff Lagarde defeated Huracán Ramírez (c) in a best two-out-of-three match for the NWA World Welterweight Championship
December 3	EMLL	Juicio Final	Mexico City, Mexico	Karloff Lagarde vs. Cavernario Galindo in a Lucha de Apuestas, hair Vs. hair match
(c) – denotes defending champion(s)

== Notable events ==
- November – Fred Kohler Enterprises closed after 40 years of operations. World Wrestling Association, based in Indianapolis, bought the rights to promote wrestling in Chicago.

== Accomplishments and tournaments ==
=== EMLL ===
Accomplishment	Winner	Date won	Notes
NWA World Middleweight Championship #1 contendership tournament	Rene Guajardo	March 19	
NWA World Middleweight Championship #1 contendership tournament	Antonio Montoro	July 23	

== Championship changes ==
=== EMLL ===
NWA World Light Heavyweight Championship
incoming champion – Gory Guerrero
No title changes

NWA World Middleweight Championship
incoming champion – Rayo de Jalisco
Date	Winner	Event/Show	Note(s)
April 9	René Guajardo	EMLL show	

NWA World Welterweight Championship
incoming champion – Karloff Lagarde
Date	Winner	Event/Show	Note(s)
August 5	Huracán Ramírez	EMLL show	
September 24	Karloff Lagarde	EMLL 32nd Anniversary Show	

Mexican National Heavyweight Championship
incoming champion - Pepe Mendieta
Date	Winner	Event/Show	Note(s)
Uncertain	Vacated	N/A	Mendieta retired
April 13	Chico Casaola	EMLL show	

Mexican National Middleweight Championship
incoming champion – El Santo
No title changes

Mexican National Lightweight Championship
incoming champion – Chanoc
Date	Winner	Event/Show	Note(s)
January 13	Rudolfo Ruiz	Carnaval de Campeones	
August 7	Alberto Muñoz	EMLL show	

Mexican National Light Heavyweight Championship
incoming champion – Ray Mendoza
Date	Winner	Event/Show	Note(s)
January 13	Raúl Reyes	Carnaval de Campeones	
May 5	Alfonso Dantés	EMLL show	

Mexican National Welterweight Championship
incoming champion – Rizado Ruiz
Date	Winner	Event/Show	Note(s)
January 13	Huracán Ramírez	EMLL show	

Mexican National Tag Team Championship
incoming champion – Possibly Rayo de Jalisco and El Santo
No title changes

Mexican National Women's Championship
incoming champion – Chabela Romero
No title changes

=== NWA ===
NWA Worlds Heavyweight Championship
Incoming Champion – Lou Thesz
Date	Winner	Event/Show	Note(s)
No title changes

== Debuts ==
- Debut date uncertain:
  - Adorable Rubí
  - Black Man
  - Bobby Heenan
  - Bob Sweetan
  - Buddy Roberts
  - Butch Miller
  - Carlos Colón
  - Dick Murdoch
  - Jerry Jarrett
  - Jos LeDuc
  - Lonnie Mayne
  - Luke Williams
  - Tiger Jeet Singh
- February 7 – Tony Salazar
- February – Ivan Koloff
- April 2 – Rusher Kimura
- May 15 – Jack Brisco
- June 3 – Masa Saito
- June – Mil Máscaras
- July 21 – Kato Kung Lee
- July – Rocky Johnson
- November – El Cobarde
- December 6 – Terry Funk

== Retirements ==
- Andreas Lambrakis (1936-1965)
- Leo Nomellini (1950-1965)
- John Pesek (1914-1965)

== Births ==
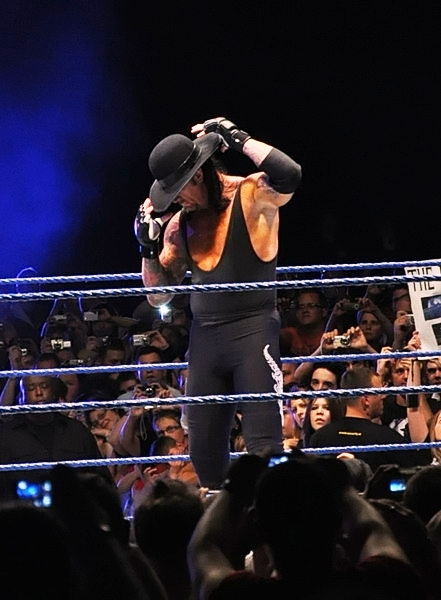
The Undertaker

- January 4 – Derrick Dukes
- January 11 – Mascarita Sagrada
- January 24:
  - Mike Awesome(died in 2007)
  - Steve Lawler (died in 2021)
- January 26 – Rip Sawyer
- February 2 – Naoki Sano
- February 21 – The Terminator
- February 24 – Bas Rutten
- February 26 – James Mitchell
- February 28 – Norman Smiley
- March 1 – Booker T
- March 3 – Danie Brits (died in 2020)
- March 16 – Steve Armstrong
- March 24 – The Undertaker
- April 5 – Villano IV
- April 13 – Bracito de Oro
- April 18 – Biff Wellington (died in 2007)
- April 26 – Tank Abbott
- May – Dick Vrij
- May 7 – Owen Hart(died in 1999)
- June 7 – Mick Foley
- June 8 – Tatanka
- June 9 – Val Puccio(died in 2011)
- June 10 – Ephesto
- June 16 – Tatsuo Nakano
- June 17 – Clarence Mason
- July 3 – Shin'ya Hashimoto(died in 2005)
- July 7 – Chris Duffy (died in 2000)
- July 22 – Shawn Michaels
- August 7 – Johnny Smith
- August 8 – Akitoshi Saito
- August 12 – Dr. Wagner Jr.
- August 16 – Masaaki Satake
- August 21 – Muffy Mower
- August 26 – Bobby Duncum Jr.(died in 1999)
- August 31 – K. C. Thunder
- September 5 – Hoshitango Imachi
- September 9 – J.W. Storm
- September 11 – Paul Heyman
- September 12 – Midnight
- September 16 – Discovery (died in 2020)
- September 27 – Ricky Fuji
- September 28 – La Diabólica
- October 11:
  - Rikishi
  - Tonga Kid
- October 16 – The Renegade(died in 1999)
- October 17 – Rossy Moreno
- October 21:
  - Charlie Norris (died in 2023)
  - Horace Hogan
- October 25 – Too Cold Scorpio
- October 27 – Harvey Wippleman
- October 28 – Jun Izumida (died in 2017)
- November 8 – Boni Blackstone
- November 14 – L.A. Park
- November 23 – Don Frye
- November 28 – Rumi Kazama (died in 2021)
- November 30 – Bart Sawyer (died in 2023)
- November 23 – Ron Waterman
- December 1 – Noriyo Tateno
- December 6 – Olímpico
- December 16 – Jason Neidhart
- December 19 – Shoichi Arai (died in 2002)
- December 27 – Bart Gunn

== Deaths ==
- January 16 – Yukon Eric 48
- February 12 – Henry Kulky 53
- April 16 – Osley Bird Saunooke 58
- May 15 – Frank Townsend (wrestler) 32
