= 1967 in professional wrestling =

1967 in professional wrestling describes the year's events in the world of professional wrestling.

== List of notable promotions ==
Only one promotion held notable shows in 1967.

Promotion Name	Abbreviation
Empresa Mexicana de Lucha Libre	EMLL

== Calendar of notable shows ==
Date	Promotion(s)	Event	Location	Main event
April	EMLL	11. Aniversario de Arena México	Mexico City, Mexico	
September 29	EMLL	EMLL 34th Anniversary Show	Mexico City, Mexico	Ángel Blanco defeated Ángel Exterminador in a best two-out-of-three falls Lucha de Apuesta mask vs. mask match
December 19	EMLL	Juicio Final	Mexico City, Mexico	Aníbal defeated Red Terror in a Lucha de Apuestas, mask Vs. mask match

== Notable events ==
- July 24 – Bruno Sammartino and Spiros Arion beat The Sicilians to become eventually the last WWWF United States Tag Team Championship.

== Accomplishments and tournaments ==
=== EMLL ===
Accomplishment	Winner	Date won	Notes
NWA World Middleweight Championship tournament	René Guajardo	September 29	
Mexican National Light Heavyweight Championship #1 contendership tournament	Alfonso Dantés	September 22 – October 6	

== Championship changes ==
=== EMLL ===
NWA World Light Heavyweight Championship
incoming champion – Vacant
Date	Winner	Event/Show	Note(s)
August 4	Ray Mendoza	EMLL show	Defeated Dory Dixon to win the vacant championship.

NWA World Middleweight Championship
incoming champion – René Guajardo
Date	Winner	Event/Show	Note(s)
March 10	Rey Mendoza	EMLL show	
May	Vacant	N/A	Championship vacated for undocumented reasons
July 29	René Guajardo	EMLL show	

NWA World Welterweight Championship
incoming champion – Karloff Lagarde
Date	Winner	Event/Show	Note(s)
May 7	Vento Castella	EMLL show	
June 9	Karloff Lagarde	EMLL show	

Mexican National Heavyweight Championship
incoming champion – Polo Torres
Date	Winner	Event/Show	Note(s)
October 30	Henry Pilusso	EMLL show	

Mexican National Middleweight Championship
incoming champion – El Santo
Date	Winner	Event/Show	Note(s)
June 20	René Guajardo	EMLL show	
July 29	Vacant	EMLL show	
December 15	Karloff Lagarde	EMLL show	

Mexican National Lightweight Championship
incoming champion – Raul Rojas
Date	Winner	Event/Show	Note(s)
September 7	Raul Guerrero	EMLL show	

Mexican National Light Heavyweight Championship
incoming champion – El Santo
Date	Winner	Event/Show	Note(s)
March	Espanto I	EMLL show	
June 12	Mil Máscaras	EMLL show	
October 15	El Nazi	EMLL show	

Mexican National Welterweight Championship
incoming champion – Alberto Muñoz
No title changes

Mexican National Tag Team Championship
incoming champion – Rayo de Jalisco and El Santo
Date	Winner	Event/Show	Note(s)
Uncertain	Unknown	N/A	
Uncertain	La Ola Blanca (Ángel Blanco and Dr. Wagner)	EMLL show	

Mexican National Women's Championship
incoming champion – Uncertain
No title changes

=== NWA ===
NWA Worlds Heavyweight Championship
Incoming Champion – Gene Kiniski
Date	Winner	Event/Show	Note(s)
No title changes

== Debuts ==
- Debut date uncertain:
  - Bobby Kay
  - Giant Haystacks
  - Jerry Brisco
  - Johnny Valiant
  - Man Mountain Mike
  - Bugsy McGraw
- July 1 – Aiko Kyo (All Japan Women)
- August 5 – Seiji Sakaguchi
- August 19 – Ole Anderson
- October – Ari Romero

== Births ==
- January 4 – Nelson Veilleux
- January 10 – Yumiko Hotta
- January 13 – Reno Riggins
- January 17 – Luther Biggs
- January 22 – Manabu Nakanishi
- February 8:
  - Dino Casanova (died in 2002)
  - Yuki Ishikawa
- February 18 – Rick Fuller
- February 21 – Danny Boy Collins
- February 22 – Psicosis II
- March 1 – Scotty Riggs
- March 4 – Johnnie Stewart
- March 9 – Bison Kimura
- March 11 – Pitbull #1
- March 17 – Billy Corgan
- March 27 – Kenta Kobashi
- March 28 – Yoji Anjo
- April 13 – Mo (died in 2025)
- April 17 – Enson Inoue
- April 23 – Mark Young (died in 2016)
- April 25 – J.T. Smith
- April 26 – Kane
- May 2 – Marty Garner
- May 4 – Jim Steele
- May 9 – Kevin Kelly
- May 10 – Nitro
- May 17 – Lori Fullington
- May 21 – Chris Benoit(died in 2007)
- May 24 – Bambi
- May 28 – Buddy Wayne(died in 2017)
- May 30 – Vampiro
- June 1 – Scoot Andrews
- June 29 – Heidi Lee Morgan
- July 3 – KeMonito
- July 9 – Andy Barrow
- July 13 – Akira Hokuto
- July 14 – Jeff Jarrett
- July 24 – Buck Quartermain
- July 26 – Pitbull #2(died in 2003)
- August 3 – Picudo(died in 2018)
- August 5 – Brody Steele
- August 8:
  - Eric Angle
  - Sable
- August 13:
  - Chad Fortune
  - Chuck Coates (died in 2025)
- September 9 – Mark Shrader
- September 19 – Alexander Karelin
- September 20 – Roger Anderson
- September 22 – Super Delfin
- September 29 – Joey Maggs(died in 2006)
- October 2 – Pierrothito
- October 9 – Eddie Guerrero(died in 2005)
- October 11 – Tazz
- October 13 – Don Callis
- October 22 – Andrew Anderson
- October 25 – Latin Lover
- October 26 – Combat Toyoda
- November 1 – Plum Mariko(died in 1997)
- November 9 – Tim Fischer
- November 13 – Ice Train (died in 2024)
- November 15 – Michiyoshi Ohara
- November 22 – Ron Powers (wrestler)
- December 15:
  - Kendall Windham
  - Elix Skipper
- December 19 – Erik Watts
- December 21:
  - Jake Gymini
  - Jesse Gymini
  - Harley Saito (died in 2016)
- December 30 – PCO

== Deaths ==
- January 7 – Leo Savage, 66
- May 28 - Doc Sarpolis, 69
- June 29 – Primo Carnera 60
- July 13 – Art Shires, 60
- August 1 – Gorila Ramos 53
- September 23 – Stanislaus Zbyszko, 88
- October 12 – Nat Pendleton, 72
- November 2 – Hans Furst, 77
