= 1968 in professional wrestling =

1968 in professional wrestling describes the year's events in the world of professional wrestling.

== List of notable promotions ==
Only one promotion held notable shows in 1968.

Promotion Name	Abbreviation
Empresa Mexicana de Lucha Libre	EMLL

== Calendar of notable shows ==
Date	Promotion(s)	Event	Location	Main event
April 26	EMLL	12. Aniversario de Arena México	Mexico City, Mexico	Huracán Ramírez defeated El Enfermero, Lucha de Apuestas mask vs. mask match
September 20	EMLL	EMLL 35th Anniversary Show	Mexico City, Mexico	Karloff Lagarde (c) defeated Blue Demon in a best two-out-of-three falls match for the NWA World Welterweight Championship
December 13	EMLL	Juicio Final	Mexico City, Mexico	El Solitario defeated Ray Mendoza in a Lucha de Apuestas, mask Vs. hair match
(c) – denotes defending champion(s)

== Notable Events ==
- June 8 - at San Francisco, California, Pepper Gomez and Pedro Morales defeat Great Sasaki and Kinji Shibuya to become the San Francisco's NWA World Tag Team Championship.
- August 17 - at Bloomington, Minnesota, Dr. X beat Verne Gagne to become the new AWA World Heavyweight Champion.
- Inside Wrestling magazine hit the newsstands with its first issue.

== Tournaments ==
=== IWE ===
Accomplishment	Winner	Date won	Notes
IWA World Series	Billy Robinson	December 19	

== Championship changes ==
=== EMLL ===
NWA World Light Heavyweight Championship
incoming champion – Ray Mendoza
Date	Winner	Event/Show	Note(s)
May 19	Ángel Blanco	EMLL show	
December 25	Ray Mendoza	EMLL show	

NWA World Middleweight Championship
incoming champion – René Guajardo
Date	Winner	Event/Show	Note(s)
December 13	El Santo	Super Viernes	

NWA World Welterweight Championship
incoming champion – Karloff Lagarde
No title changes

Mexican National Heavyweight Championship
incoming champion - Henry Pilusso
No title changes

Mexican National Middleweight Championship
incoming champion – Karloff Lagarde
Date	Winner	Event/Show	Note(s)
February 25	Humberto Garza	EMLL show	
October 20	Alberto Munoz	EMLL show	

Mexican National Lightweight Championship
incoming champion – Raul Guerrero
Date	Winner	Event/Show	Note(s)
August 20	Estrella Blanca	EMLL show	

Mexican National Light Heavyweight Championship
incoming champion – El Nazi
Date	Winner	Event/Show	Note(s)
March 22	Mil Máscaras	EMLL show	
April 10	Vacated	N/A	Championship vacated for undocumented reasons

Mexican National Welterweight Championship
incoming champion – Alberto Muñoz
Date	Winner	Event/Show	Note(s)
October 20	Vacated	N/A	Championship vacated after Muñoz won the Mexican National Middleweight Championship

Mexican National Tag Team Championship
incoming champion – Possibly La Ola Blanca
(Ángel Blanco and Dr. Wagner)
No title changes

Mexican National Women's Championship
incoming champion – Uncertain
No title changes

=== NWA ===
NWA Worlds Heavyweight Championship
Incoming Champion – Gene Kiniski
No title changes

== Debuts ==
- Debut date uncertain:
  - Blackjack Mulligan
  - Dusty Rhodes
  - El Halcón
  - Jimmy Golden
  - Kung Fu
  - Lee Marshall
  - Marty Jones
  - Michel Martel
  - Nikolai Volkoff
  - El Sicodélico
- January 1 – Ringo Mendoza
- February 24 – Enrique Vera
- August 30 – Kim Duk
- November 1 – Jimmy Garvin
- December – Chavo Guerrero Sr.
- December 6 – J. J. Dillon

== Retirements ==
- Billy Riley (1920s-1968)

== Births ==
- January 5 – Noboru Asahi
- January 8 – Bull Nakano
- January 9 – Silver King(died in 2019)
- January 12 – Big Dick Dudley(died in 2002)
- January 15 – Bull Buchanan
- January 31 – Ray Odyssey
- February 13 – Daisuke Ikeda
- February 19 – August Smisl
- March 7 – Súper Brazo
- March 19 – Eddie Watts
- March 28 – Jaime Cardriche (died in 2000)
- March 31 – Naoya Ogawa
- April 16 – Vickie Guerrero
- April 24:
  - Yuji Nagata
  - El Espantito(died in 2020)
- May 10 – William Regal
- May 14 – Mantaur(died in 2023)
- May 24 – Rayo Tapatío I
- May 26 – Simon Diamond
- June 17 – Minoru Suzuki
- June 20 – Mr. Gannosuke
- June 26 – Koji Nakagawa
- June 30 – The Bodyguard
- July 3 – Sombrita
- July 8 – Romeo Valentino
- July 17 – Doctor X (died in 2011)
- July 18 – Pequeño Violencia
- August 2 – Maximum Capacity (died in 2014)
- August 5:
  - Kendo Kashin
  - Leroy Howard (died in 2018)
- August 11:
  - Head Hunter A
  - Head Hunter B
- August 20 – Duke Droese
- August 24 – Funaki
- August 26 – Joe Thunder
- September 3 – Black Pearl
- September 24 – Eric Sbraccia
- September 28:
  - Jado
  - Apolo Dantés
- October 3 – Chi Chi Cruz
- October 28 – Mayumi Ozaki
- October 30 – Dr. Luther
- October 31 – Russ McCullough
- November 3 – Dirty White Girl
- November 10 – Mitsuya Nagai
- November 12:
  - Disco Inferno
  - Kazue Nagahori
- November 13 – Mike Lozansky (died in 2003)
- November 29 – Hayabusa(died in 2016)
- December 8 – Michael Cole
- December 9:
  - Kurt Angle
  - Virus
  - Jack Dupp
- December 10 - Mephisto
- December 26 – Mideon

== Deaths ==
- January 15 – Firpo Segura 60
- February 19 – George Hackenschmidt 89
- March 9:
  - Bert Ruby 57
  - John Katan 66
- May 30 – Espanto I 37
- June 10 – Wladek Zbyszko 76
- June 21 – Ike Robin, 81
- August 11 – Oklahoma Kid (Elmer Gerald), 30
- December 3 – Dick Shikat, 71
