= EMLL 31st Anniversary Show =

Mexican Professional wrestling show

- Promotion: Empresa Mexicana de Lucha Libre
- Date: September 25, 1964
- City: Mexico City, Mexico
- Venue: Arena México
- Attendance: Unknown

Event chronology
← Previous; EMLL 30th Anniversary Show (2)	Next → EMLL Carnaval de Campeones

EMLL Anniversary Show chronology
← Previous; 30th Anniversary (2)	Next → 32nd Anniversary

The EMLL 31st Anniversary Show (Spanish: 31. Aniversario de EMLL) was a professional wrestling major show event produced by Empresa Mexicana de Lucha Libre (EMLL) that took place on September 25, 1964, in Arena México, Mexico City, Mexico. The event commemorated the 31st anniversary of EMLL, which would become the oldest professional wrestling promotion in the world. The Anniversary show is EMLL's biggest show of the year, their Super Bowl event. The EMLL Anniversary Show series is the longest-running annual professional wrestling show, starting in 1934.

== Production ==
=== Background ===
The 1964 Anniversary show commemorated the 31st anniversary of the Mexican professional wrestling company Empresa Mexicana de Lucha Libre (Spanish for "Mexican Wrestling Promotion"; EMLL) holding their first show on September 22, 1933 by promoter and founder Salvador Lutteroth. EMLL was rebranded early in 1992 to become Consejo Mundial de Lucha Libre ("World Wrestling Council"; CMLL) signal their departure from the National Wrestling Alliance. With the sales of the Jim Crockett Promotions to Ted Turner in 1988 EMLL became the oldest, still-operating wrestling promotion in the world. Over the years EMLL/CMLL has on occasion held multiple shows to celebrate their anniversary but since 1977 the company has only held one annual show, which is considered the biggest show of the year, CMLL's equivalent of WWE's WrestleMania or their Super Bowl event. CMLL has held their Anniversary show at Arena México in Mexico City, Mexico since 1956, the year the building was completed, over time Arena México earned the nickname "The Cathedral of Lucha Libre" due to it hosting most of EMLL/CMLL's major events since the building was completed. Traditionally EMLL/CMLL holds their major events on Friday Nights, replacing their regularly scheduled Super Viernes show.

=== Storylines ===
The event featured an undetermined number of professional wrestling matches with different wrestlers involved in pre-existing scripted feuds, plots and storylines. Wrestlers were portrayed as either heels (referred to as rudos in Mexico, those that portray the "bad guys") or faces (técnicos in Mexico, the "good guy" characters) as they followed a series of tension-building events, which culminated in a wrestling match or series of matches. Due to the nature of keeping mainly paper records of wrestling at the time no documentation has been found for some of the matches of the show.

== Event ==
Of the five matches on the show, documentation of participants and results exist for only two of them. In the first of the matches Karloff Lagarde sought to win the NWA World Welterweight Championship for the second time as he fought against the popular moviestar and champion Huracán Ramírez in a two out of three falls match. Lagarde defeated Huracán Ramírez in a high paced match to regain the championship he had lost to Ramirez only months earlier. The other confirmed match saw Rayo de Jalisco defeat NWA World Middleweight Champion Benny Galant to win the title for a second time.

== Aftermath ==
Rayo de Jalisco held the title until April 4, 1963 where he was defeated by René Guajardo, he would hold the title for a third time later in his career.

=== Results ===
No.	Results	Stipulations
1	Tony López defeated Jorge Allende	Singles match
2	El Enfermero vs. Tono Montoro ended in a time-limit draw	Singles match
3	Rubén Juárez defeated The Monster	Singles match
4	Denays Hall defeated Espanto I	Singles match
5	Felipe Ham Lee defeated Roger Kirby by disqualification	Singles match
6	Karloff Lagarde defeated Huracán Ramírez (c)	Best two-out-of-three falls match for the NWA World Welterweight Championship
7	Rayo de Jalisco defeated Benny Galant (c)	Best two-out-of-three falls match for the NWA World Middleweight Championship
(c) / – the champion(s) heading into the match
