= 1970 in professional wrestling =

1970 in professional wrestling describes the year's events in the world of professional wrestling.

== List of notable promotions ==
Only one promotion held notable shows in 1970.

Promotion Name	Abbreviation
Empresa Mexicana de Lucha Libre	EMLL

== Calendar of notable shows ==
Date	Promotion(s)	Event	Location	Main Event
April 24	EMLL	14. Aniversario de Arena México	Mexico City, Mexico	Ray Mendoza defeated Coloso Colosetti (c) in a Best two-out-of-three falls match for the NWA World Light Heavyweight Championship
September	EMLL	EMLL 37th Anniversary Show	Mexico City, Mexico	Raúl Mata defeated Shibata in a Best two-out-of-three falls Lucha de Apuesta hair vs. hair match
December 11	EMLL	Juicio Final	Mexico City, Mexico	Coloso Colosetti and René Guajardo defeated Ángel Blanco and El Solitario in a tag team tournament final
(c) – denotes defending champion(s)

== Championship changes ==
=== EMLL ===
NWA World Light Heavyweight Championship
incoming champion – Coloso Colosetti
Date	Winner	Event/Show	Note(s)
March 20	Ray Mendoza	EMLL show	
November 27	El Solitario	EMLL show	

NWA World Middleweight Championship
Incoming champion – El Solitario
Date	Winner	Event/Show	Note(s)
June 28	Mashio Koma	EMLL show	
December 6	Aníbal	EMLL show	

NWA World Welterweight Championship
Incoming champion – Karloff Lagarde
No title changes

Mexican National Heavyweight Championship
Incoming champion - Goliath
Date	Winner	Event/Show	Note(s)
February 2	Raul Reyes	EMLL show	

Mexican National Middleweight Championship
Incoming champion - Rene Guajardo
Date	Winner	Event/Show	Note(s)
May 13	Humberto Garza	EMLL show	

Mexican National Lightweight Championship
Incoming champion – Rodolfo Ruiz
No title changes

Mexican National Light Heavyweight Championship
Incoming champion – Raul Mata
No title changes

Mexican National Welterweight Championship
Incoming champion – Karloff Lagarde
Date	Winner	Event/Show	Note(s)
May 2	Huracan Ramirez	EMLL show	

Mexican National Women's Championship
Incoming champion – Uncertain
No title changes

=== NWA ===
NWA Worlds Heavyweight Championship
Incoming champion – Dory Funk, Jr.
No title changes

== Tournaments ==
=== IWE ===
Accomplishment	Winner	Date won	Notes
IWA World Series	Billy Robinson	May 14	

== Births ==
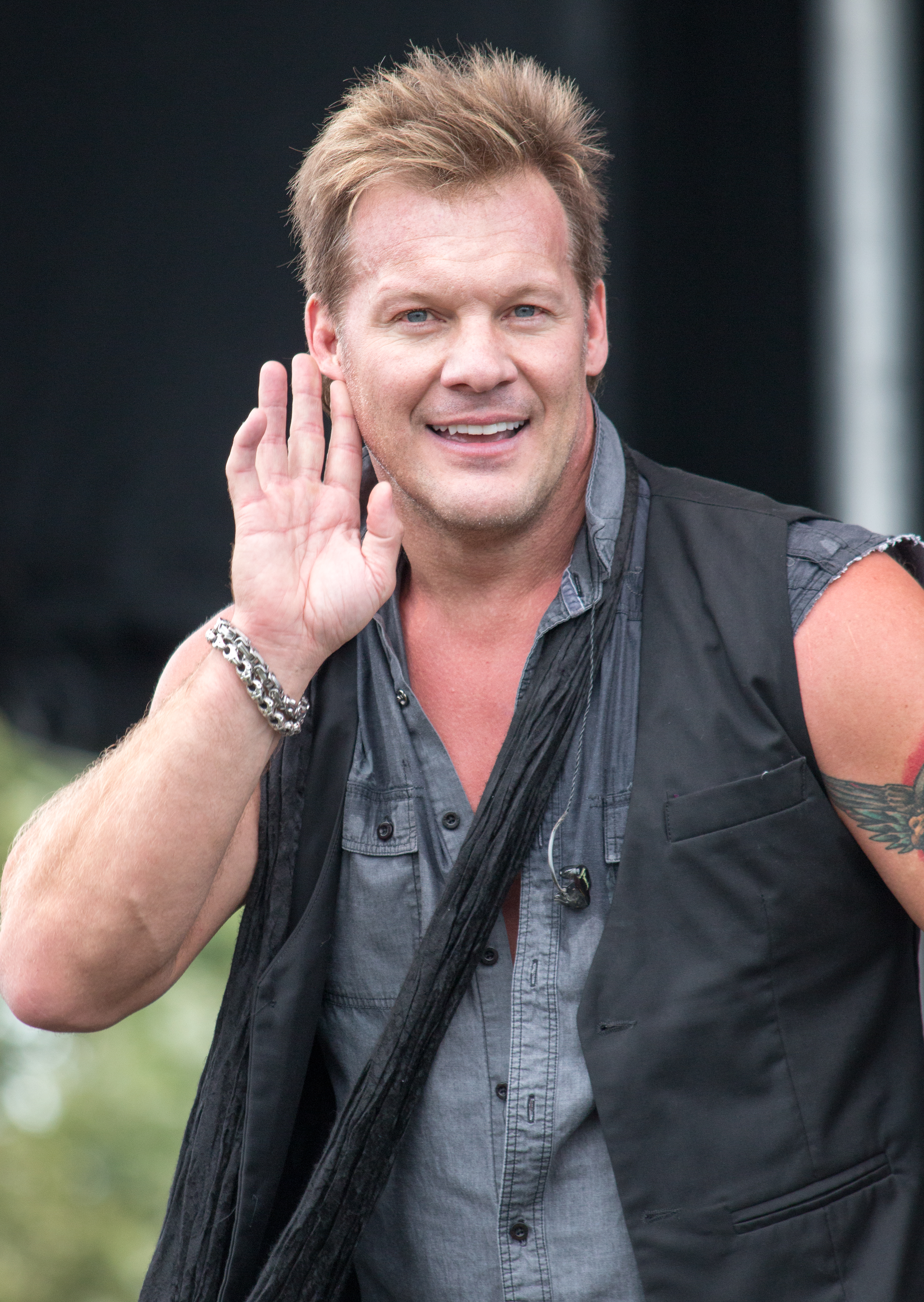
Chris Jericho

- Date Unknown
  - Robbie Rage
- January 1 – Kimberly Page
- January 4 – Chris Kanyon (d. 2010)
- January 5 – Pamela Paulshock
- January 10 – Buff Bagwell
- January 14 – Gene Snitsky
- January 15 – Shane McMahon
- January 16 – Rick Bognar (d. 2019)
- January 25 – Carl Malenko
- February 1 – Mark Frear (d. 2014)
- February 15 – Mariko Yoshida
- February 19 – Shark Tsuchiya
- February 27 - Toshiyo Yamada
- February 28 - Hollywood Yates
- March 6 –
  - Masao Inoue
  - Tsuyoshi Kosaka
- March 17 – Katsumi Usuda
- March 21 – Frank Parker
- March 23 – Midajah
- March 24 – Christopher Daniels
- April 7 – Rosey (d. 2017)
- April 8 – Silver Cat (d. 2024)
- April 9 – Super Shisa
- April 13 – Monty Brown
- April 21 – Soulman Alex G
- April 22 – Electroshock
- April 24 - Brian Gamble
- April 25 – Chubby Dudley
- April 26 – Ron Reis
- April 29 – Master P
- May 1 – Jack Bull
- May 6 – Corey Maclin (d. 2013)
- May 20 – Cassandro
- May 21 – The Hungarian Barbarian
- May 29 – Pete Gas
- May 30 – Supreme (died in 2020)
- May 31 – Takashi Sugiura
- June 1 – Ian Rotten
- June 18 – Kenny Kaos
- June 21 – Snot Dudley
- June 26 – Lady Apache
- July 2 – Amy Weber
- July 3 – Doc Dean (d. 2018)
- July 4 – Rico Suave (d.2025)
- July 6 – Don Fujii
- July 7 – Navajo Warrior
- July 21 – Shawn Stasiak
- July 23 – Cinthia Moreno
- August 9:
  - Wing Kanemura
  - Evil Dead
- August 13 – Spike Dudley
- August 22 – Barry Houston
- September 8 – Lodi
- September 14 – Satoshi Kojima
- September 19 – Carbell Ito
- September 25 – Aja Kong
- September 27 - Oscar
- September 29:
  - Yoshihiro Tajiri
  - The Kat
- October 4 – Heavy Metal
- October 5 – Hiromitsu Kanehara
- October 12 – Rodney Mack
- October 16 :
  - Lenny Lane
  - Kazuyuki Fujita
- October 20 :
  - Chavo Guerrero Jr.
  - Tiger Mask IV
- October 21 – Karloff Lagarde Jr. (died in 2024)
- October 22 – D'Lo Brown
- October 23 – Tony Kozina
- November 2 – Sharmell
- November 3 – Dawn Marie Psaltis
- November 6 – Bryant Anderson
- November 9 – Chris Jericho
- November 12 – Elektra
- November 22 – Joe Son
- December 4 – Sylvester Terkay
- December 7 – Veneno
- December 9 – Cathy Dingman
- December 15 – Bruno Sassi
- December 18 – Rob Van Dam
- December 23 – Mima Shimoda

== Debuts ==
=== Debut Date ===
- January 6 - Dos Caras
- January 29 - Villano III
- April - Greg Valentine
- May 10 - Perro Aguayo
- October - Kevin Sullivan
- October 13 - Akio Sato

=== Date Unknown ===
- Dino Bravo
- Superstar Billy Graham
- Jerry Lawler
- Ken Mantell
- Don Muraco
- Alexis Smirnoff
- Pak Song
- Jerry Stubbs
- Hercules Ayala
- Mariko Akagi (All Japan Women)

== Retirements ==
- Bette Boucher (1962 – 1970)

== Deaths ==
- March 23 – Skull Murphy, 39
- April 6 – Sam Sheppard, 46
- May 16 – Emile Czaja, 60
- June 4 - Charley Retzlaff, 65
- August 20 – Jerry London, 41
