= EMLL 32nd Anniversary Show =

Mexican Professional wrestling show

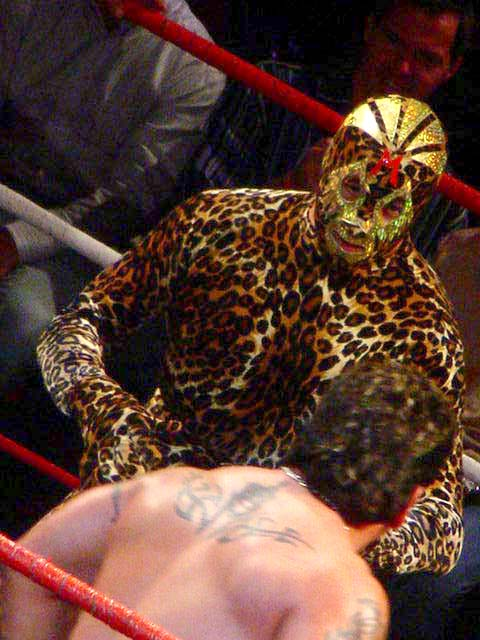
- Mil Máscaras, unsuccessfully challenged for the Mexican National Light Heavyweight Championship
- Promotion: Empresa Mexicana de Lucha Libre
- Date: September 24, 1965
- City: Mexico City, Mexico
- Venue: Arena México
- Attendance: 17,100

Event chronology
← Previous; 9. Aniversario de Arena México	Next → EMLL 33rd Anniversary Show (1)

EMLL Anniversary Show chronology
← Previous; 31st Anniversary	Next → 33rd Anniversary (1)

The EMLL 32nd Anniversary Show (Spanish: 32. Aniversario de EMLL) was a professional wrestling major show event scripted and produced by Empresa Mexicana de Lucha Libre (EMLL; Spanish for "Mexican Wrestling Enterprise") that took place on September 24, 1965, in Arena México, Mexico City, Mexico. The event commemorated the 32nd anniversary of EMLL, which would later become the oldest professional wrestling promotion in the world. The Anniversary show is EMLL's biggest show of the year, their Super Bowl event. The EMLL Anniversary Show series is the longest-running annual professional wrestling show, starting in 1934.

In the main event of the seven-match show Karloff Lagarde defeated Huracán Ramírez in a best two-out-of-three falls match to win the NWA World Welterweight Championship. In the semi-main event match Espanto I successfully defended the Mexican National Light Heavyweight Championship against Mil Máscaras, giving Mil Máscaras his first defeat in Arena México. Also on the show the team of El Santo and Rayo de Jalisco defeated the team of Benny Galant and Henry Pilusso by disqualification. Four additional singles matches rounded out the show. It was reported as a sell out.

== Production ==
=== Background ===
The 1965 Anniversary show commemorated the 32nd anniversary of the Mexican professional wrestling company Empresa Mexicana de Lucha Libre (Spanish for "Mexican Wrestling Promotion"; EMLL) holding their first show on September 22, 1933 by promoter and founder Salvador Lutteroth. EMLL was rebranded early in 1992 to become Consejo Mundial de Lucha Libre ("World Wrestling Council"; CMLL) signal their departure from the National Wrestling Alliance. With the sales of the Jim Crockett Promotions to Ted Turner in 1988 EMLL became the oldest, still-operating wrestling promotion in the world. Over the years EMLL/CMLL has on occasion held multiple shows to celebrate their anniversary but since 1977 the company has only held one annual show, which is considered the biggest show of the year, CMLL's equivalent of WWE's WrestleMania or their Super Bowl event. CMLL has held their Anniversary show at Arena México in Mexico City, Mexico since 1956, the year the building was completed, over time Arena México earned the nickname "The Cathedral of Lucha Libre" due to it hosting most of EMLL/CMLL's major events since the building was completed. Traditionally EMLL/CMLL holds their major events on Friday Nights, replacing their regularly scheduled Super Viernes show.

=== Storylines ===
The event featured seven professional wrestling matches with different wrestlers involved in pre-existing scripted feuds, plots and storylines. Wrestlers were portrayed as either heels (referred to as rudos in Mexico, those that portray the "bad guys") or faces (técnicos in Mexico, the "good guy" characters) as they followed a series of tension-building events, which culminated in a wrestling match or series of matches.

== Event ==
Champion Espanto I ("Terror I") successfully defending the Mexican National Light Heavyweight Championship against Mil Máscaras. Máscaras had only made his debut in July of that year, but the fact that he was already in a feature match on EMLL's biggest show of the year showed that he had potential already early in his career.

In the main event of the night Huracán Ramírez challenged Karloff Lagarde for the NWA World Welterweight Championship. Lagarde was able to turn back the challenges of Ramírez in what was described as a "stellar bout".

== Results ==
No.	Results	Stipulations
1	Espanto III defeated Jose Assary	Best two-out-of-three falls match
2	Alberto Munoz defeated Tony Stone	Best two-out-of-three falls match
3	Cavernario Galindo defeated Reuben Juarez	Best two-out-of-three falls match
4	Ray Mendoza vs. Rene Guajardo ended in a draw – double knock out	Best two-out-of-three falls match
5	El Santo and Rayo de Jalisco defeated Benny Galant and Henry Pilusso	tag team match
6	Espanto I (c) defeated Mil Máscaras	Best two-out-of-three falls match for the Mexican National Light Heavyweight Championship
7	Karloff Lagarde defeated Huracán Ramírez (c)	Best two-out-of-three match for the NWA World Welterweight Championship
(c) / – the champion(s) heading into the match
