= EMLL 33rd Anniversary Show =

EMLL 33rd Anniversary Show may refer to:

- EMLL 33rd Anniversary Show (1), a professional wrestling major show on September 2, 1966, in Arena México, Mexico City, Mexico
- EMLL 33rd Anniversary Show (2), a professional wrestling major show on September 30, 1966, in Arena México, Mexico City, Mexico
