= EMLL 33rd Anniversary Show (2) =

Mexican Professional wrestling show

EMLL 33rd Anniversary Show #2
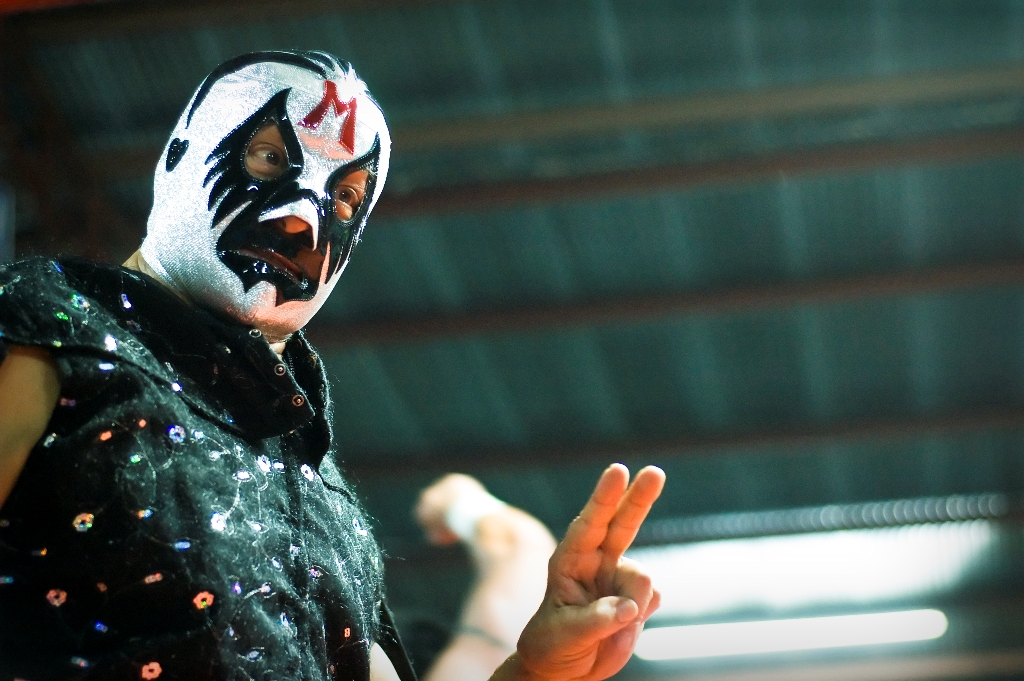
- Mil Máscaras, teamed up with Black Shadow on the show.
- Promotion: Empresa Mexicana de Lucha Libre
- Date: September 30, 1966
- City: Mexico City, Mexico
- Venue: Arena México
- Attendance: Unknown

EMLL Anniversary Show chronology
← Previous; 33rd Anniversary (1)	Next → 34th Anniversary

Mexican professional wrestling promotion celebrated their 33rd anniversary with two professional wrestling major shows centering on the anniversary date in early to mid-September. The second EMLL 33rd Anniversary Show (Spanish: 33. Aniversario de EMLL) took place on September 30, 1966, in Arena México, Mexico City, Mexico to commemorate the anniversary of EMLL, which over time became the oldest professional wrestling promotion in the world. The Anniversary show is EMLL's biggest show of the year, their Super Bowl event. The EMLL Anniversary Show series is the longest-running annual professional wrestling show, starting in 1934.

== Production ==
=== Background ===
The 1966 Anniversary show commemorated the 33rd anniversary of the Mexican professional wrestling company Empresa Mexicana de Lucha Libre (Spanish for "Mexican Wrestling Promotion"; EMLL) holding their first show on September 22, 1933 by promoter and founder Salvador Lutteroth. EMLL was rebranded early in 1992 to become Consejo Mundial de Lucha Libre ("World Wrestling Council"; CMLL) signal their departure from the National Wrestling Alliance. With the sales of the Jim Crockett Promotions to Ted Turner in 1988 EMLL became the oldest, still-operating wrestling promotion in the world. Over the years EMLL/CMLL has on occasion held multiple shows to celebrate their anniversary but since 1977 the company has only held one annual show, which is considered the biggest show of the year, CMLL's equivalent of WWE's WrestleMania or their Super Bowl event. CMLL has held their Anniversary show at Arena México in Mexico City, Mexico since 1956, the year the building was completed, over time Arena México earned the nickname "The Cathedral of Lucha Libre" due to it hosting most of EMLL/CMLL's major events since the building was completed. Traditionally EMLL/CMLL holds their major events on Friday Nights, replacing their regularly scheduled Super Viernes show.

=== Storylines ===
The event featured at least five professional wrestling matches with different wrestlers involved in pre-existing scripted feuds, plots and storylines. Wrestlers were portrayed as either heels (referred to as rudos in Mexico, those that portray the "bad guys") or faces (técnicos in Mexico, the "good guy" characters) as they followed a series of tension-building events, which culminated in a wrestling match or series of matches. Due to the nature of keeping mainly paper records of wrestling at the time no documentation has been found for some of the matches of the show.

== Event ==
The second 33rd Anniversary show saw a continuation of the feud between the team of Rene Guajardo and Karloff Lagarde and the team of Jerry London and Felipe Ham Lee. At the first 33rd Anniversary Show Guajardo had defeated Lee and London had defeated Lagarde in a series of Lucha de Apuesta hair vs. hair match. the two winners faced off in yet another Lucha de Apuesta hair vs. hair match, which saw Guajardo gain a measure of revenge on behalf of his tag team partner as Jerry London left Arena Mexico with his hair shaved off.

=== Results ===
No.	Results	Stipulations
1	El Rebelde defeated El Vikingo	Singles match
2	Raul Reyes defeated Chino Chow	Singles match
3	Dr. Wagner defeated Relampago Cubano	Singles match
4	Antonio Montoro defeated Tiger Steiner	Singles match
5	Ray Mendoza defeated Oso Negro by DQ	Singles match
6	El Santo and Rayo de Jalisco (c) defeated Black Shadow and Mil Máscaras	Best two-out-of-three falls tag team match for the EMLL Arena México Tag Team Championship
7	Rene Guajardo defeated Jerry London	Best two-out-of-three falls Lucha de Apuesta hair vs. hair match
(c) / – the champion(s) heading into the match
