= Caryn Mower =

American actress, stuntwoman, and professional wrestler (born 1965)

Personal information
- Born: Caryn Lynn Mower; August 21, 1965 (age 60) Eau Claire, Wisconsin, United States
- Website: CarynMowerOnline.com

Professional wrestling career
- Ring name(s): Carnidge; Surfer Girl; Muffy
- Billed height: 5 ft 6 in (1.68 m)
- Billed weight: 125 lb (57 kg)
- Trained by: Ultimate Pro Wrestling: Ultimate University
- Debut: July 1999
- Retired: 2003

Caryn Lynn Mower (born August 21, 1965) is an American actress, stuntwoman, and former professional wrestler. Throughout her career, she performed for various professional wrestling promotions such as Ultimate Pro Wrestling under the ring name Carnidge. She also performed briefly for the World Wrestling Federation as Muffy, the on-screen personal trainer of Stephanie McMahon-Helmsley as part of the McMahon-Helmsley Faction.

A longtime performer on stunt shows, most notably for Universal Studios Hollywood, she has also had extensive involvement in film and television as both a stunt performer and stunt coordinator during the 1990s and 2000s.

== Early life and career ==
Born in Eau Claire, Wisconsin, Mower grew up in Glendora, California and attended Glendora High School. Both of Mowers parents were physical education teachers. Prior to her stunt and wrestling career, Mower worked as an aerobics instructor and played the role of Red Sonja in a live action show based on Conan the Barbarian. Studying martial arts, she eventually became a second degree black belt in judo, jujutsu, and karate. Meeting stuntmen and others involved in the film industry, she became interested in film fighting and stunt work. By the late-1980s, she appeared as a stunt double on America's Most Wanted and Baywatch.

Playing the role of Helen in the Universal Studios Hollywood stunt show Waterworld: A Live Sea World Spectacular, she also made numerous film and television series throughout the 1990s including Red Shoe Diaries, Buffy the Vampire Slayer, Ally McBeal, V.I.P., Charmed, Popular, and Family Law.

She also began appearing in minor acting roles on Profiler and Crossing Jordan as well as The Contender, Vacancy, and The Last Sentinel.

== Professional wrestling career ==
=== Ultimate Pro Wrestling (1999) ===
She got her start in the wrestling world in early 1999 when she went on an audition for a part as a comic book model held at Ultimate Pro Wrestling, and was encouraged by the owner of UPW Rick Bassman to give wrestling a try. Mower accepted his offer and began training at UPW's Ultimate University in Huntington Beach, California. She was considered a fast learner and soon became a regular performer at UPW shows.

Wrestling under the name Carnidge, she soon established herself as one of the leading female wrestlers in Ultimate Pro Wrestling among other independent promotions facing Nikki Roxx and April Hunter. During the summer of 1999, WWF talent scouts came to UPW to assess the talent there, and Mower impressed them enough to sign her to a developmental deal on August 31, 1999. She continued training with UPW and working shows with them until the WWF came up with a gimmick for her.

=== World Wrestling Federation (2000) ===
In early 2000, Mower was given a psychotic fitness instructor gimmick and the ring name "Muffy". Although Mower was originally intended to debut alongside Trish Stratus, she was instead introduced separately and would come out before live WWF events for some non-televised promos, where she would insult the audience members by calling them fat and telling them that they needed to get in shape. In April 2000, she briefly made her television debut on SmackDown! as Stephanie McMahon's personal trainer, but after two appearances the gimmick was shelved, and Mower returned to UPW. In September 2000, she was released from her WWF contract due to them not being able to come up with another gimmick for her.

=== Return to UPW and retirement (2000-2003) ===
Although she continued wrestling part-time for UPW for a few years afterwards, she began appearing in the television series Malcolm in the Middle, Strong Medicine, According to Jim, Birds of Prey, Without a Trace, Leap of Faith, and Firefly as well as The Flintstones in Viva Rock Vegas, Artificial Intelligence: A.I., and Identity before retiring in 2003 to pursue her stunt career full-time. In September 2002, she would also make a guest appearance on Battle Dome, winning the first all-woman competition.

== Post-wrestling ==
Since her retirement from professional wrestling, Mower returned to work as a stunt double in the Pirates of the Caribbean video game, films Collateral and Pirates of the Caribbean: Dead Man's Chest, and television series Huff; Cracking Up; and The Brotherhood of Poland, New Hampshire. In recent years, Mower has appeared in Elizabethtown, Poseidon, Mustang Sally, and Nancy Drew and on the television series Still Standing, Room 401, and K-Ville.
