= Jerry London (wrestler) =

Canadian professional wrestler

Personal information
- Born: Murray Gerald Aitken; July 9, 1929 Hamilton, Ontario, Canada
- Died: August 20, 1970 (aged 41) San Francisco, California, U.S.

Professional wrestling career
- Ring name(s): Jerry London; Jerry Aitken
- Billed height: 6 ft 1 in (1.85 m)
- Billed weight: 200 lb (91 kg)

Jerry Linden (July 9, 1929 – August 20, 1970), or Jerry Atkins, better known by the ring name Jerry London, was a Canadian professional wrestler and former world champion, most notably holding the NWA World Middleweight Championship in 1966.

A journeyman wrestler, he wrestled throughout the world for various wrestling promotions: Atlantic Grand Prix Wrestling, Capitol Wrestling Corporation, Empresa Mexicana de la Lucha Libre, Florida Championship Wrestling, Georgia Championship Wrestling, Gulf Coast Championship Wrestling, Japan Wrestling Association, Jim Crockett Promotions, Maple Leaf Wrestling, NWA Mid-Pacific Promotions, NWA San Francisco, and NWA Tri-State.

Linden committed suicide on August 20, 1970, hours after losing a bout at the Cow Palace in San Francisco, California. His suicide was one of several deaths to occur during the "Golden Age of Wrestling" along with Yukon Eric, George Drake and Skull Murphy.

== Early career ==
Born in Hamilton, Ontario, Linden made his pro debut sometime in the mid-1950s. He spent his early career wrestling under the name Jerry Aiken or Atkins. In April 1956, Linden wrestled Johnny Demchuk and Bill Curry at North Bay Memorial Gardens. Within two years, he was wrestling in the United States for the National Wrestling Alliance. On July 19, 1958, Linden teamed with Harry "Georgia Boy" Smith to wrestle Mark Starr and Tommy O'Toole at a Florida Championship Wrestling show in Fort Lauderdale, Florida. He wrestled O'Toole in a singles match that same night. On October 8, 1960, Linden was defeated by Roy McClarty in St. Paul, Minnesota.

== Capitol Wrestling Corporation ==
By the early-1960s, Linden had established himself as a talented technical wrestler in Eastern Canada and the Northeastern United States. The Bridgeport Telegram compared his "clever" scientific mat style to Billy Darnell. Linden spent most of 1961 wrestling for the Capitol Wrestling Corporation. One of his earliest appearances was against Miguel Torres at Sunnyside Garden Arena on April 15. During the next two weeks, Linden challenged the team of Buddy Rogers and Bob Orton in Bridgeport, Connecticut and Long Island, New York. He lost both encounters teaming with Arnold Skaaland and Mr. Puerto Rico respectively. Linden made several television appearances for promoter Joe Smith's weekly City Arena shows in Bridgeport, Connecticut that spring, most notably as the opponent of masked wrestler The Black Terror in his television debut. Linden also faced Larry Simon, Juan Sebastian, and Dick Steinborn in singles competition. On June 19, 1961, Linden and Angelo Savoldi took on Mark Lewin and Don Curtis in a Best 2-of-3 Falls match in Trenton, New Jersey. That same month, Linden returned to his home country where he and Emile Duprée wrestled Lou Albano and Jack "The Neck" Vanski at the Halifax Forum.

== National Wrestling Alliance ==
Linden headed south the following year to work for Jim Crockett Promotions in the NWA's Mid-Atlantic territory. On May 3, 1962, Linden and Jim LaRock lost to John Smith and Ivan Kameroff in a Best 2-out-of-3 Falls match at Greensboro Coliseum. He then moved on to Gulf Coast Championship Wrestling in Knoxville, Tennessee. In June, Linden participated in a 7-man "Russian Roulette" battle royal also involving Doug Kinslow, George "Baby Blimp" Harris, The Fields Brothers (Bobby and Lee Fields), and NWA Southern Tag Team Champions Jack Donovan and Jackie Fargo. Linden managed to toss Harris over the top rope before he himself was eliminated by Fargo. Three months later, he was the first victim of The Red Devil when the masked wrestler made his Gulf Coast debut. Linden subsequently "turned heel" when he attacked Doug Kinslow during a tag team match (with Jan Madrid) against The Fields Brothers. The two met in a Best 2-of-3 Falls match "grudge match" which saw Kinslow knock Linden unconscious with a foreign object to score the second pinfall. That same year, Linden was recruited by "outlaw" promoter George Leonard Clay who planned to run against Leroy McGuirk's in the NWA's Mid-South territory.

Linden traveled to Florida Championship Wrestling a year later. On January 2, 1964, Linden and Jack Allen defeated Pedro Godoy and Killer Karl Kox in Jacksonville, Florida. Linden spent much of his time in the territory in tag team matches against such formidable teams as Brute Bernard and Skull Murphy, and Duke Keomuka and Hiro Matsuda. His various partners included Eddie Graham, Don Whittler, Tim Woods, Tito Carreon and Tim Geohagen. Linden also had a few singles matches against Boris Malenko, Joe McCarthy and Pedro Godoy. Linden moved north to Georgia Championship Wrestling where, on April 3, Linden wrestled Stan Stasiak at the Atlanta Municipal Auditorium.

== Maple Leaf Wrestling ==
In early 1965, Linden returned to his native Canada where he enjoyed a near year-long run with Maple Leaf Wrestling. On April 25, Linden and Victor Rivera fought to a 15-minute time-limit draw at Maple Leaf Gardens in front of over 5,100 fans. He and Alexander the Great wrestled to a 20-minute draw the following month. On July 20, Linden was eliminated by Mike Valentino in Maple Leaf's first annual Tournament of Champions at the Oshawa Civic Auditorium. Weeks later, Linden teamed with Paul DeMarco against The Beast and Professor Hiro. Linden was pinned by The Beast in a tag team bout lasting over 22 minutes. Linden was subsequently defeated by The Beast and Professor Mye Hiro in single matches. On September 9, Linden wrestled Bob Leipler to a 20 min. draw. In a tag team match the following week, Linden and Andy Robin battled The Beast and Professor Hiro to a draw. On September 26, he submitted to The Beast after being put in a bearhug. Linden also suffered losses to Smasher Sloan at the War Memorial Stadium. Linden made his last appearance at the Maple Leaf Gardens two days later against Tiger Jeet Singh who defeated him via his "cobra" submission hold.

== Empresa Mexicana de Lucha Libre ==
After a brief visit to the NWA's Florida territory, Linden headed south to Mexico's Empresa Mexicana de Lucha Libre (EMLL, "Mexican Wrestling Enterprise") promotion where he and Felipe Ham Lee feuded with Los Rebeldes (René Guajardo and Karloff Lagarde). Though his stay was short-lived, Linden excelled in the lucha libre-style of wrestling and arguably enjoyed greatest success. Linden defeated Guajardo in Mexico City for the NWA World Middleweight Championship on May 14, 1966. He defended the championship for almost three weeks before dropping the belt back to Guajardo in Monterrey. That fall, Linden headlined both of EMLL's 33rd Anniversary shows at Arena México. On the first show on September 9, 1966, Linden and Ham Lee faced René Guajardo and Karloff Lagarde in separate best two-out-of-three falls Lucha de Apuesta hair vs. hair matches. While Linden won his match against Lagarde, his partner was defeated by Guajardo. The second part, three weeks later on September 30, saw the winners of the Luchas de Apuestas bouts, Linden and Guajardo, face off in a final encounter. Linden lost the bout and was forced to have his head shaved bald after the match per lucha libre traditions.

== Jim Crockett Promotions ==
That summer, he appeared in bouts against Les Thatcher, Jan Madrid and Gene Dundee in South Carolina and Virginia. On September 1, Linden defeated Bull Ramos in Lynchburg, Virginia. In the next few weeks, he made multiple appearances at the Greensboro Coliseum against The Missouri Mauler, Rudy Kay and Tiny Mills. In late 1967, Linden entered the promotion's tag team division. On December 9, 1967, Linden teamed with Rick Hunter against Tiny Mills and Steve Stanlee in a best two-out-of-three falls match in Lexington, North Carolina. Hunter won the first fall with a victory roll pin but their opponents ended up scoring the other two.

== Later career ==
On December 20, 1967, Linden returned to NWA Tri-State where he wrestled Gerry Brisco in Springfield, Missouri. On January 3, 1968, Lenden traveled overseas to appear at Sumo Hall in Tokyo, Japan. In front of 12,000 fans, and broadcast live on NTV, Linden was pinned by Karl Gotch after a 10-minute bout. Four months later, he made an appearance for NWA Mid-Pacific Promotions. On April 10, Linden was defeated by Peter Maivia in a Best 2-of-3 Falls match at the sold-out Honolulu Civic Auditorium. It has been called one of the all-time classic matches in the promotion's history. In November 1968, Linden had a series of return matches with Gerald Brisco in NWA Tri-State. He lost their first two encounters in Fort Smith, Arkansas, and Oklahoma City, Oklahoma. They had their last match in Tulsa, on December 16, 1968, which ended in a time-limit draw. Linden wrestled the next year as a preliminary wrestler for NWA: All-Star Wrestling and Portland Wrestling.

== Death ==
Linden spent the last year of his career wrestling for NWA San Francisco. On August 20, 1970, he wrestled his final match at the Cow Palace. After losing the bout, Linden left the arena and checked into the Embassy Hotel in downtown San Francisco where he committed suicide by taking an overdose of sleeping pills. He reportedly left a suicide note that read "I'm tired of the farce of life. I wish to explore the beyond". Linden's death was one of several high-profile suicides to occur during the "Golden Age of Wrestling" along with Yukon Eric, George Drake and Skull Murphy.

== Championships and accomplishments ==
- Empresa Mexicana de la Lucha Libre
  - NWA World Middleweight Championship (1 time)

=== Luchas de Apuestas record ===
Winner (wager)	Loser (wager)	Location	Event	Date	Notes
Jerry London (hair)	Karloff Lagarde (hair)	Mexico City	EMLL 33rd Anniversary Show	September 9, 1966	
René Guajardo (hair)	Jerry London (hair)	Mexico City	EMLL 33rd Anniversary Show	September 30, 1966	
