= EMLL 33rd Anniversary Show (1) =

Mexican Professional wrestling show

EMLL 33rd Anniversary Show #1
- Promotion: Empresa Mexicana de Lucha Libre
- Date: September 2, 1966
- City: Mexico City, Mexico
- Venue: Arena México

EMLL Anniversary Show chronology
| ← Previous; 32nd Anniversary | Next → 33rd Anniversary (2) |

Mexican professional wrestling promotion celebrated their 33rd anniversary with two professional wrestling major shows centering on the anniversary date in early to mid-September. The first EMLL 33rd Anniversary Show (Spanish: 33. Aniversario de EMLL) took place on September 2, 1966, in Arena México, Mexico City, Mexico to commemorate the anniversary of EMLL, which over time became the oldest professional wrestling promotion in the world. The Anniversary show is EMLL's biggest show of the year, their Super Bowl event. The EMLL Anniversary Show series is the longest-running annual professional wrestling show, starting in 1934.

== Production ==
=== Background ===
The 1966 Anniversary show commemorated the 33rd anniversary of the Mexican professional wrestling company Empresa Mexicana de Lucha Libre (Spanish for "Mexican Wrestling Promotion"; EMLL) holding their first show on September 22, 1933 by promoter and founder Salvador Lutteroth. EMLL was rebranded early in 1992 to become Consejo Mundial de Lucha Libre ("World Wrestling Council"; CMLL) signal their departure from the National Wrestling Alliance. With the sales of the Jim Crockett Promotions to Ted Turner in 1988 EMLL became the oldest, still-operating wrestling promotion in the world. Over the years EMLL/CMLL has on occasion held multiple shows to celebrate their anniversary but since 1977 the company has only held one annual show, which is considered the biggest show of the year, CMLL's equivalent of WWE's WrestleMania or their Super Bowl event. CMLL has held their Anniversary show at Arena México in Mexico City, Mexico since 1956, the year the building was completed, over time Arena México earned the nickname "The Cathedral of Lucha Libre" due to it hosting most of EMLL/CMLL's major events since the building was completed. Traditionally EMLL/CMLL holds their major events on Friday Nights, replacing their regularly scheduled Super Viernes show.

=== Storylines ===
The event featured an undetermined number of professional wrestling matches with different wrestlers involved in pre-existing scripted feuds, plots and storylines. Wrestlers were portrayed as either heels (referred to as rudos in Mexico, those that portray the "bad guys") or faces (técnicos in Mexico, the "good guy" characters) as they followed a series of tension-building events, which culminated in a wrestling match or series of matches. Due to the nature of keeping mainly paper records of wrestling at the time no documentation has been found for some of the matches of the show.

== Event ==
The first of EMLL's 33rd Anniversary shows featured an unknown number of matches, traditionally EMLL has five to six matches per show, but at times have had more or less and the total number has not been verified. The September 2, show featured two featured events, both best two-out-of-three falls Lucha de Apuesta matches with the competitors risking their hair on the outcome of the matches. The matches came about as a result of a storyline feud between the tag teams of Rene Guajardo and Karloff Lagarde going against Felipe Ham Lee and Jerry London. In the first Apuesta match Rene Guajardo defeated Felipe Ham Lee, forcing Lee to be shaved bald after the match. In the second match Jerry London defeated Karloff Lagarde, causing Lagarde to leave his black locks in the ring.

== Results ==
| No. | Results | Stipulations |
|---|---|---|
| 1 | Rene Guajardo defeated Felipe Ham Lee | Best two-out-of-three falls Lucha de Apuesta hair vs. hair match |
| 2 | Jerry London defeated Karloff Lagarde | Best two-out-of-three falls Lucha de Apuesta hair vs. hair match |
