= Alberto Muñoz =

Mexican professional wrestler

Personal information
- Born: Ismael Muñoz Lopez; January 15, 1943 Tepatitlán, Jalisco, Mexico
- Died: December 15, 2019 (aged 76)

Professional wrestling career
- Ring name(s): Alberto Muñoz; White Man
- Billed height: 172 cm (5 ft 8 in)
- Billed weight: 82 kg (181 lb)
- Trained by: Diablo Velasco
- Debut: 1964
- Retired: 1980s

Ismael Muñoz Lopez (January 15, 1943 – December 15, 2019) was a Mexican professional wrestler best known under the ring name Alberto Muñoz. Muñoz was active from 1964 until the 1980s. Muñoz worked for most of his career using his real name, but in the 1970s he also wrestled as the masked White Man, teaming with Black Man to form a popular tag team. In his career Muñoz held several top championships promoted by Empresa Mexicana de Lucha Libre (EMLL).

== Professional wrestling career ==
Muñoz made his professional wrestling debut in 1964 and within a couple of years began working regularly for Empresa Mexicana de Lucha Libre (EMLL), the oldest professional wrestling promotion in the world. Initially he wrestled in the lightweight weightdivision, which in Mexico means between 63 kg (139 lb) and 70 kg (150 lb). On August 7, 1965 Muñoz defeated Rodolfo Ruíz to win the Mexican National Lightweight Championship. Over the following six months Muñoz defended the title against both the deposed champion and other lightweight contenders. On February 6, 1966 Muñoz moved up to the Welterweight division (between 70 kg (150 lb) and 78 kg (172 lb)) when he defeated Huracán Ramírez for the Mexican National Welterweight Championship. After winning the Welterweight title Muñoz vacated the Lightweight title to focus on the more prestigious Welterweight division. Muñoz held the Welterweight title from February 6, 1966, until October 20, 1968, for a total of 979 days, the longest reign of any Mexican National Welterweight Champion to date. On March 9, 1968 Muñoz defeated Rene Guajardo to win the Mexican National Middleweight Championship. Muñoz wrestled in both the Welterweight and the middleweight division (between 82 kg (181 lb) and 87 kg (192 lb)), holding and defending both titles for seven months. On October 20, 1968 Muñoz vacated the Welterweight title to focus on the Middleweight title. Muñoz would hold the Middleweight title until November 20, 1969, where Rene Guajado regained the title. Alberto Muñoz held a championship from August 7, 1965, until November 20, 1969, more than four years in total. On July 11, 1971 Muñoz defeated Karloff Lagarde to win the NWA World Welterweight Championship, perhaps the most prestigious championship in Mexico at the time. During a tag team match on June 26, 1973 Muñoz (who was teaming with El Marqués) suffered a serious neck injury after a headscissors takedown move from his opponent El Nazi (who teamed with Hayashi) went badly and Muñoz's head was driven into the canvas. He became unresponsive after the accident and was taken to the local hospital where he was in a medically induced coma for several days. As a result of the injury Muñoz was forced to vacate the NWA World Welterweight Championship and temporarily retire from wrestling.

When Muñoz returned to the ring almost a year later he adopted a new ring persona, an enmascarado (masked wrestler) called "White Man", teaming up with Black Man to form a very popular and successful tag team. The two teamed for a while but never won a tag team title, despite several chances at the Arena Coliseo Tag Team Championship. by 1978 Muñoz dropped the "White Man" character as he was forced to work a reduced schedule due to age and injuries. Muñoz' last notable wrestling appearance came in April, 1979 when he lost a Luchas de Apuesta, hair vs. mask match, to Villano III. Apuesta matches often pay a quite a lot to the person agreeing to lose his hair or mask, giving Muñoz one last big payday before retiring in the early 1980s.

== Championships and accomplishments ==
- Empresa Mexicana de Lucha Libre
  - Mexican National Lightweight Championship (2 times)
  - Mexican National Middleweight Championship (2 times)
  - Mexican National Welterweight Championship (2 times)
  - NWA World Welterweight Championship (1 time)

== Luchas de Apuestas record ==
Winner (wager)	Loser (wager)	Location	Event	Date	Notes
Alberto Muñoz (hair)	El Conde Negro (mask)	N/A	Live event	1966	
Alberto Muñoz (hair)	Rizado Ruíz (hair)	N/A	Live event	1966	
Alberto Muñoz (hair)	Huriki Sito (hair)	Guadalajara, Jalisco	Live event	August 11, 1967	
Villano III (mask)	Alberto Muñoz (hair)	Veracruz, Veracruz	Live event	April 28, 1979	
