= René Guajardo =

Mexican professional wrestler (1933 – 1992)

Manuel Guajardo Mejorado

Personal information
- Born: Manuel Guajardo Mejorado; January 4, 1933
- Died: May 11, 1992 (aged 59)

Professional wrestling career
- Ring name(s): René Guajardo; Indio Guajardo
- Billed height: 1.69 m (5 ft 7 in)
- Billed weight: 68 kg (150 lb)
- Trained by: Gerardo Rodríguez Pérez (Zandor wrestler), Chema López; Rolando Vera
- Debut: October 8, 1954

Manuel Guajardo Mejorado (January 4, 1933 – May 11, 1992), better known as René Guajardo, was a Mexican professional wrestler.

== Professional wrestling career ==
René Guajardo was born in Villa Mainero, Tamaulipas, Mexico. At the age of 16, Guajardo decided to become a professional wrestler. He joined a wrestling gym in Monterrey, Nuevo León, where he was trained by Gerardo Rodríguez Pérez (Zandor wrestler), Chema López and Rolando Vera. René made his debut in 1954 against Oso Negro. His hard work and determination caught the eye of EMLL recruiters who offered him a contract with their promotion company. He debuted for Empresa Mexicana de Lucha Libre (EMLL) in Arena Coliseo on October 8 of that same year.

During his first three years in the business, he wrestled as a técnico, but in 1957 he watched the then rudo Karloff Lagarde wrestle in Monterrey and started to wonder if he'd have more success as a rudo. René and Karloff would eventually become good friends. Lagarde was already an established main event star and held the National Welterweight Title, however, most main event matches were between Tag teams, and he knew that he would have more success as a member of a tag team. Lagarde believed the young luchador had a lot of raw talent so he proposed that the two form a team, an offer which Guajardo accepted. After teaming with Lagarde, he began competing in main event matches in a matter of weeks. Guajardo thrived in the spotlight, his technical skills combined with his violent and energetic style made him one of the most hated rudos in Mexico. He was referred to as "un rudo con recursos" (a rudo with technical resources). On October 13, 1960, Guajardo defeated his mentor Rolando Vera in a match for the NWA World Middleweight Championship. For the next 13 years, Guajardo would exchange that title with Antonio Posa, Rayo de Jalisco, Aníbal, Jerry London and Ray Mendoza.

During the 60s, Ray Mendoza, Lagarde and Guajardo formed an alliance both inside and outside of the ring. In the ring, they competed alongside one another, outside of it, they were top negotiators. The pressure the three wrestlers placed on EMLL helped improve the conditions of other wrestlers working for that promotion. Guajardo and Lagarde's team, now known as "Los Rebeldes" (The Rebels), became National Tag Team champions in 1962. Guajardo, Lagarde and Mendoza would often team with one another, so when Lagarde and Mendoza were competing as a team, Guajardo would align himself with Rolando Vera and Benny Galán. On June 22, 1967, Guajardo achieved one of the greatest victories of his wrestling career when he defeated El Santo for the Mexican National Middleweight Championship, a title which Santo held for four years. Guajardo held the title for a few months until he lost it on March 9, 1968 to Alberto Muñoz. Guajardo regained the title on November 20, 1969, then lost it for the final time on May 13, 1970. In 1967, the Rebeldes team split up violently and both men started a long feud that culminated in their famous 1968 singles bout which saw Guajardo emerge victoriously.

When the famous EMLL split came in 1974, Guajardo, Mendoza and Lagarde played an instrumental role in the newly formed Universal Wrestling Association. On November 26, 1975, Guajardo became the first ever UWA World Middleweight Championship by defeating Anibal in Mexico City. He would later lose the title then regain it on October 31, 1976 from Gran Hamada, and finally lose it again on October 2, 1977 to Anibal.

Guajardo also began promoting "La Division del Norte" (The Northern Division) which was based in Monterrey and Nuevo León. His promotion company was very successful as it featured a less traditional style of wrestling that included a lot of ringside brawling and the use of bottles, chairs and illegal objects to "spice up" the matches. Guajardo competed sporadically until 1982 when he quietly retired from the ring.

During his career, Guajardo won several wager matches against famous wrestlers, such as Halcon de Oro, Ray Mendoza, Black Shadow, Felipe Ham Lee, Chino Chow, Yamamoto and Perro Aguayo. He also appeared in four lucha libre action films. René Guajardo continued working as a wrestling promoter until his death on May 11, 1992, as a result of complications resulting from liver cancer. In 1996, he was inducted into the Wrestling Observer Newsletter Hall of Fame.

== Championships and accomplishments ==
- Empresa Mexicana de la Lucha Libre
  - Mexican National Middleweight Championship (2 times)
  - Mexican National Tag Team Championship (1 time) - with Karloff Lagarde
  - NWA World Middleweight Championship (6 times)
- Universal Wrestling Association
  - UWA World Middleweight Championship (2 times)
- Wrestling Observer Newsletter
  - Wrestling Observer Newsletter Hall of Fame (Class of 1996)

== Luchas de Apuestas record ==
Winner (wager)	Loser (wager)	Location	Event	Date	Notes
René Guajardo (hair)	Chino Chow (hair)	N/A	Live event	N/A	
René Guajardo (hair)	Black Shadow (hair)	Mexico City	Live event	April 30, 1965	
René Guajardo (hair)	Ray Mendoza (hair)	Mexico City	Live event	August 1965	
René Guajardo (hair)	Felipe Ham Lee (hair)	Mexico City	EMLL 33rd Anniversary Show	September 9, 1966	
René Guajardo (hair)	Jerry London (hair)	Mexico City	EMLL 33rd Anniversary Show	September 30, 1966	
René Guajardo (hair)	Halcón de Oro I (mask)	Mexico City	Live event	March 15, 1968	
El Santo (mask)	René Guajardo (hair)	N/A	Live event	August 10, 1962	
El Solitario (mask)	René Guajardo (hair)	Mexico City	Live event	December 25, 1968	
René Guajardo (hair)	Yamamoto (hair)	N/A	Live event	June, 1973	
Aníbal (mask) and Steve Wright (hair)	René Guajardo (hair) and Tigre Colombiano (mask)	Mexico City	18. Aniversario de Arena México	April 26, 1974	
Gran Hamada (hair)	René Guajardo (hair)	Mexico City	Live event	July 26, 1975	
René Guajardo (hair)	Perro Aguayo (hair)	Mexico City	Live event	June 29, 1980	
