= NWA World Welterweight Championship =

Professional wrestling championship

- The current belt design

Details
- Promotion: Empresa Mexicana de Lucha Libre (1946–1990); Consejo Mundial de Lucha Libre (1991–1996, 2007–2010); New Japan Pro-Wrestling (1996–1997); Toryumon Japan / Mexico (1999–2007); NWA Mexico / Independent promotions (2010–2017)
- Date established: March 15, 1946
- Date retired: September 30, 2017

Other name
- World Welterweight Championship (1946–1952)
Statistics
- First champion: El Santo
- Final champion: Akantus
- Most reigns: Karloff Lagarde, Américo Rocca (3 reigns)
- Longest reign: Karloff Lagarde (7 years, 186 days)
- Shortest reign: Shinjiro Otani, Último Dragón (1 day)
- Oldest champion: Blue Demon (53 years, 66 days)
- Youngest champion: La Sombra (18 years, 24 days)
- Heaviest champion: Shinjiro Otani (102 kilograms (225 lb)) (Note: The official weight of some of the champions have not been documented, making it possible that there was a lighter champion)
- Lightest champion: Karloff Lagarde (68 kilograms (150 lb))

The NWA World Welterweight Championship (Spanish: Campeonato Mundial Welter de NWA) is an inactive professional wrestling championship governed by the National Wrestling Alliance (NWA) and most recently promoted by NWA Mexico. The championship was originally created in 1946 by the Mexican promotion Consejo Mundial de Lucha Libre (CMLL). As with all professional wrestling championships, matches for the NWA World Welterweight Championship were not won or lost competitively but by a pre-planned ending to a match, with the outcome determined by the CMLL bookers and match makers. CMLL controlled the championship from 1946 until 1996 and again from 2007 until 2010. From 1996 until 2007 the championship was promoted mainly in Japan, initially as one of eight championships that made up the New Japan Pro-Wrestling (NJPW) J-Crown Championship. After the J-Crown was discontinued the title remained in Japan promoted by the Toryumon federation until 2007 when it returned to Mexico and CMLL. CMLL was a member of the National Wrestling Alliance (NWA) until the late 1980s but chose to keep the championship and the NWA prefix after leaving the NWA. The inaugural champion was El Santo; the final recognized champion was Akantus.

== History ==
The championship predates the creation of the National Wrestling Alliance in 1948 and was initially called the World Welterweight Championship, promoted by Empresa Mexicana de Lucha Libre (EMLL). When EMLL joined the National Wrestling Alliance in 1952, the NWA prefix was added. In the late 1980s, EMLL withdrew from the NWA and changed its name to Consejo Mundial de Lucha Libre (CMLL). CMLL retained ownership of three NWA-branded championships which originated in the promotion, the other two being the NWA World Middleweight Championship and the NWA World Light Heavyweight Championship. All continued to be billed as "Campeonatos de NWA" (NWA Championships). On occasion, a promotion declared the championship vacant, which meant there was no champion at that point in time. This was either due to a storyline or real-life issues such as a champion suffering an injury and being unable to defend the championship, or leaving the company. All title matches held in Mexico took place under two out of three falls rules. The official definition of the welterweight weight limit in Mexico is 70 kg (150 lb) to 78 kg (172 lb), but promotions have ignored the weight limit at times and crowned champions both heavier and lighter than the rules defined. (Note: One example of the weight limit being ignored was when Mephisto won the championship despite weighing 90 kg (200 lb), 12 kg (26 lb) over the weight limit.)

El Santo became the first NWA World Welterweight Champion by winning an eight-man tournament when he defeated Pete Pancoff in the finals. In 1992, the then-champion Misterioso left CMLL to join the newly formed Asistencia Asesoría y Administración (AAA), vacating the championship as a result. CMLL had created the CMLL World Welterweight Championship in February 1992 as their top welterweight championship, and thus did not crown a new NWA championship for three years. Negro Casas defeated El Hijo del Santo in a tournament final as CMLL brought the championship back in the winter of 1995. The following August Casas was one of eight champions to compete in an NJPW-promoted tournament to unify the championships into the J-Crown championship. Casas lost in the first round to Shinjiro Ohtani, marking the first time the championship had changed hands outside Mexico. The championship would switch hands in each round of the tournament as Último Dragón won it the next night and then Great Sasuke won it as he won the tournament. In 1996 and 1997 the championship was defended as part of the J-Crown until it was broken up into the original individual championships. After this it was once again inactive until early 1999 when Dragon Kid became the first Toryumon-promoted champion. From 1999 until 2007 the championship was promoted exclusively by Toryumon, mainly in Japan and occasionally by Torymon's Mexican branch. On November 27, 2007, CMLL wrestler La Sombra won the title from Hajime Ohara on a Toryumon Mexico show, bringing the championship back under the control of CMLL.

In March 2010, Blue Demon Jr., the president of NWA Mexico, demanded that CMLL (a non-member of the NWA) cease promoting the NWA-branded championships, declaring that all three championships had been vacated as far as the NWA was concerned. NWA Mexico had already tried to reclaim CMLL's three NWA-branded titles on a previous occasion. CMLL ignored both requests completely, with Mephisto, the NWA Welterweight Champion, responding that "the championships belong to CMLL", thus the NWA could not vacate them. On August 12, 2010, CMLL unveiled the new NWA World Historic Welterweight Championship to replace the original championship, which it conceded to NWA Mexico. The CMLL made the last CMLL-promoted NWA World Welterweight champion, Averno, the first NWA World Historic Welterweight Champion. On June 22, 2011, Cassandro became the first NWA Mexico-promoted Welterweight Champion when he defeated Dr. Cerebro on a show in London, England.

Akantus was the most recent NWA World Welterweight champion, having defeated Impostor Jr. to win the title on April 24, 2016, marking the only known championship match in his reign. Akantus was the 63rd overall champion and the 47th person to hold the Championship. Karloff Lagarde and Américo Rocca are tied for the most title reigns, a total of three, while Lagarde holds the record for the longest individual title reign, 2,742 days from 1958 until 1965. Two men have held the title for just one day: Shinjiro Otani and Último Dragón.

== Reigns ==
Key
No.	Overall reign number
Reign	Reign number for the specific champion
Days	Number of days held
N/A	Unknown information
(NLT)	Championship change took place "no later than" the date listed
†	Championship change is unrecognized by the promotion

No.	Champion	Championship change			Reign statistics		Notes	Ref.
No.	Champion	Date	Event	Location	Reign	Days	Notes	Ref.
Empresa Mexicana de la Lucha Libre (EMLL)
1	El Santo	March 15, 1946	Super Viernes	Mexico City	1	336	Defeated Pete Pancoff to become the first champion.	
2	Jack O'Brien	February 14, 1947	Super Viernes	Mexico City	1	805		
3	Gory Guerrero	April 29, 1949	Super Viernes	Mexico City	1	805		
4	Bobby Bonales	July 13, 1951	Super Viernes	N/A	1	441		
National Wrestling Alliance (NWA) / Empresa Mexicana de la Lucha Libre (EMLL)
5	El Santo	September 26, 1952	EMLL 19th Anniversary Show	Mexico City	2	364		
6	Blue Demon	September 25, 1953 (Note: listed as July 25 by Wrestling Observer Newsletter)	EMLL 20th Anniversary Show	Mexico City	1	1,589		
7	Karloff Lagarde	January 31, 1958	EMLL show	Mexico City	1	2,743		
8	Huracán Ramírez	August 5, 1965	12. Aniversario de la Arena Isabel	Cuernavaca, Morelos	1	50		
9	Karloff Lagarde	September 24, 1965	EMLL 32nd Anniversary Show	Mexico City	2	590		
10	Vento Castella	May 7, 1967	EMLL show	Mexico City	1	33		
11	Karloff Lagarde	June 9, 1967	EMLL show	Mexico City	3	1,463		
12	Alberto Muñoz	June 11, 1971	EMLL show	Mexico City	1	867		
—	Vacated	October 25, 1973	—	—	—	—	EMLL vacated the championship after Muñoz suffered a near-fatal injury. (Note: injury sustained June 24, 1973, per Halcon 51.)	
13	Mano Negra	December 14, 1973	EMLL show	Mexico City	1	(Note: The exact date on which the title was vacated is unknown, which means the title reign lasted between 338 and 503 days.)	Mano Negra defeated Karloff Lagarde to win the vacant title.	
—	Vacated	1975	—	—	—	—	The championship was vacated when Mano Negra left EMLL.	
14	Fishman	May 1, 1975	EMLL show	Mexico City	1	24	Fishman defeated Alberto Muñoz to win the vacant title.	
15	Blue Demon	May 25, 1975	EMLL show	Mexico City	2	320		
16	Fishman	April 9, 1976	EMLL show	Mexico City	2	224		
17	Mano Negra	November 19, 1976	EMLL show	Mexico City	2	882		
18	Américo Rocca	April 20, 1979	EMLL show	Mexico City	1	274		
19	Kato Kung Lee	January 19, 1980	EMLL show	Mexico City	1	106		
20	El Supremo	May 4, 1980	EMLL show	Mexico City	1	31		
21	Lizmark	June 4, 1980	EMLL show	Acapulco, Guerrero	1	506		
22	La Fiera	October 23, 1981	Super Viernes	Mexico City	1	268		
23	Américo Rocca	July 18, 1982	EMLL show	Guadalajara, Jalisco	2	558		
24	Mocho Cota	January 27, 1984	Super Viernes	Mexico City	1	181		
25	Chamaco Valaguez	July 26, 1984	EMLL show	Cuernavaca, Morelos	1	479	erroneously believed to have vacated the title on July 20, 1985 after winning the NWA World Middleweight Championship.	
26	El Dandy	November 17, 1985	EMLL show	Mexico City	1	140		
27	Monarca Cruz	April 6, 1986	EMLL show	Monterrey, Nuevo León	1	79		
Empresa Mexicana de la Lucha Libre (EMLL)
28	El Dandy	August 24, 1986	EMLL show	N/A	2	70		
29	Américo Rocca	November 2, 1986	EMLL show	Mexico City	3	606		
30	Solar II	June 30, 1988	EMLL show	Cuernavaca, Morelos	1	106		
31	Fuerza Guerrera	October 14, 1988	EMLL show	Mexico City	1	231		
32	Águila Solitaria	June 2, 1989	Super Viernes	Mexico City	1	111		
33	Fuerza Guerrera	September 21, 1989	Jueves Arena Puebla	Puebla, Puebla	2	806		
34	Misterioso	December 6, 1991	Domingos Arena Mexico	Mexico City	1	196		
Consejo Mundial de Lucha Libre (CMLL)
—	Vacated	June 19, 1992	—	—	—	—	The championship was vacated when Misterioso left CMLL.	
35	Negro Casas	December 1, 1995	Juicio Final	Mexico City	1	246	Negro Casas defeated El Hijo del Santo in a tournament final to win the vacant title.	
36	Shinjiro Otani	August 3, 1996	G1 Climax 1996; Day 2	Tokyo, Japan	1	1		
37	Último Dragón	August 4, 1996	G1 Climax 1996; Day 3	Tokyo, Japan	1	1		
Part of the J-Crown Championship
38	The Great Sasuke	August 5, 1996	G1 Climax 1996; Day 4	Tokyo, Japan	1	67	The championship became one of eight championships comprising New Japan Pro-Wrestling's J-Crown Championship.	
39	Último Dragón	October 11, 1996	Osaka Crush Night	Osaka, Japan	2	85		
40	Jushin Thunder Liger	January 4, 1997	Wrestling World 1997	Tokyo, Japan	1	183		
41	El Samurai	July 6, 1997	Summer Struggle 1997	Sapporo, Japan	1	35		
42	Shinjiro Otani	August 10, 1997	The Four Heaven in Nagoya Dome	Nagoya, Japan	2	87		
—	Vacated	November 5, 1997	—	—	—	—	Otani vacated six of the seven remaining J-Crown titles after being forced by the World Wrestling Federation to return their Light Heavyweight Championship belt, ending the J-Crown Championship.	
Toryumon Japan
43	Dragon Kid	February 6, 1999	King of Dragon Japan	Nagoya, Japan	1	78	Dragon Kid defeated Dr. Cerebro to win the vacant title.	
44	Judo Suwa	April 25, 1999	Dragon Fever: Spring Storm	Kawasaki, Japan	1	454		
45	Kenichiro Arai	July 22, 2000	Dragon's Crash 2000	Tokyo, Japan	1	152		
—	Vacated	December 21, 2000	—	—	—	—	The championship was vacated after outside interference during a match on December 15 in Kawasaki, Japan, in which Susumu Mochizuki defeated Arai.	
46	Kenichiro Arai	January 29, 2001	Muy Bien 2001	Tokyo, Japan	2	118	Defeated Yasushi Kanda in a tournament final to win the vacant title.	
47	Susumu Mochizuki	May 27, 2001	Premium Live Match Vol. 20	Kobe, Japan	1	126		
48	Ryo Saito	September 30, 2001	Absoltamente	Tokyo, Japan	1	209		
49	Genki Horiguchi	April 27, 2002	Premium Live Match Vol. 29	Kobe, Japan	1	57	Erroneously recorded by Toryumon Japan as the 48th reign; this offset persisted until the title moved to Osaka Pro Wrestling.	
—	Vacated	June 23, 2002	—	—	—	—	The championship was vacated following a no contest between Horiguchi and Dragon Kid.	
50	Ricky Marvin	July 7, 2002	IIIer Aniversario	Kobe, Japan	1	17	Defeated Super Nova to win the vacant championship.	
51	Genki Horiguchi	July 24, 2002	Verano Peligroso; Day 5	Kumamoto, Japan	2	4		
52	Darkness Dragon	July 28, 2002	Verano Peligroso; Day 8	Shimonoseki, Japan	1	236		
—	Vacated	March 21, 2003	—	—	—	—	Darkness Dragon vacated the title due to injury.	
53	Yossino	March 22, 2003	El Numero Uno 2003	Sapporo, Japan	1	456	Defeated Genki Horiguchi to win the vacant title.	
—	Vacated	June 20, 2004	—	—	—	—	Yossino vacated the title in order to focus on winning the Toryumon Último Dragón Gym Championship.	
54	Hajime Ohara	May 13, 2006	DragonMania	Mexico City	1	252	Defeated La Máscara to win the vacant title.	
Osaka Pro Wrestling (OPW)
55	Super Delfin	January 20, 2007	Saturday Night Story	Osaka, Japan	1	21		
56	Hajime Ohara	February 10, 2007	Osaka Holiday Paradise	Osaka, Japan	2	290		
Consejo Mundial de Lucha Libre (CMLL)
57	La Sombra	November 27, 2007	Martes Arena Mexico	Mexico City	1	547	This victory brought the championship back under CMLL's control.	
58	Mephisto	May 27, 2009	CMLL show	Acapulco, Guerrero	1	442	CMLL replaced the championship with the NWA World Historic Welterweight Championship on August 12, 2010.	
—	Vacated	August 12, 2010	—	—	—	—	The championship was vacated when CMLL returned it to NWA.	
National Wrestling Alliance (NWA) / NWA Mexico
59	Cassandro	June 25, 2011	NWA Mexico UK Tour	London, United Kingdom	1	1,331	Defeated Dr. Cerebro to win the vacant Championship.	
60	Magno	February 15, 2015	Independent show	El Paso, Texas	1	70	This was a three-way match that also included Boby Zavala.	
—	Vacated	April 26, 2015	—	—	—	—	Magno was stripped of the championship after signing a full time contract with WWE.	
61	Impostor Jr.	May 31, 2015	Independent show	El Paso, Texas	1	189	Defeated Boby Zavala to win the vacant championship.	
62	Ultimo Samuray	December 6, 2015	Independent show	El Paso, Texas	1	19		
63	Impostor Jr.	December 25, 2015	Independent show	El Paso, Texas	2	121		
64	Akantus	April 24, 2016	Independent show	El Paso, Texas	1	524	Records of title matches/defenses are not presently available beyond August 2016. The title reign is considered to have ended on September 30, 2017, when Lightning One's ownership of the NWA went into effect and the NWA terminated its contracts with its licensees. Lightning One vacated or retired all of the NWA's titles except the World Heavyweight, Women's, and World Tag Team championships.	
Championship history is unrecorded from August 2016 to September 30, 2017.
—	Deactivated	September 30, 2017	—	—	—	—	The championship was retired after the NWA was purchased by Lightning One, Inc.	

== Combined reigns ==
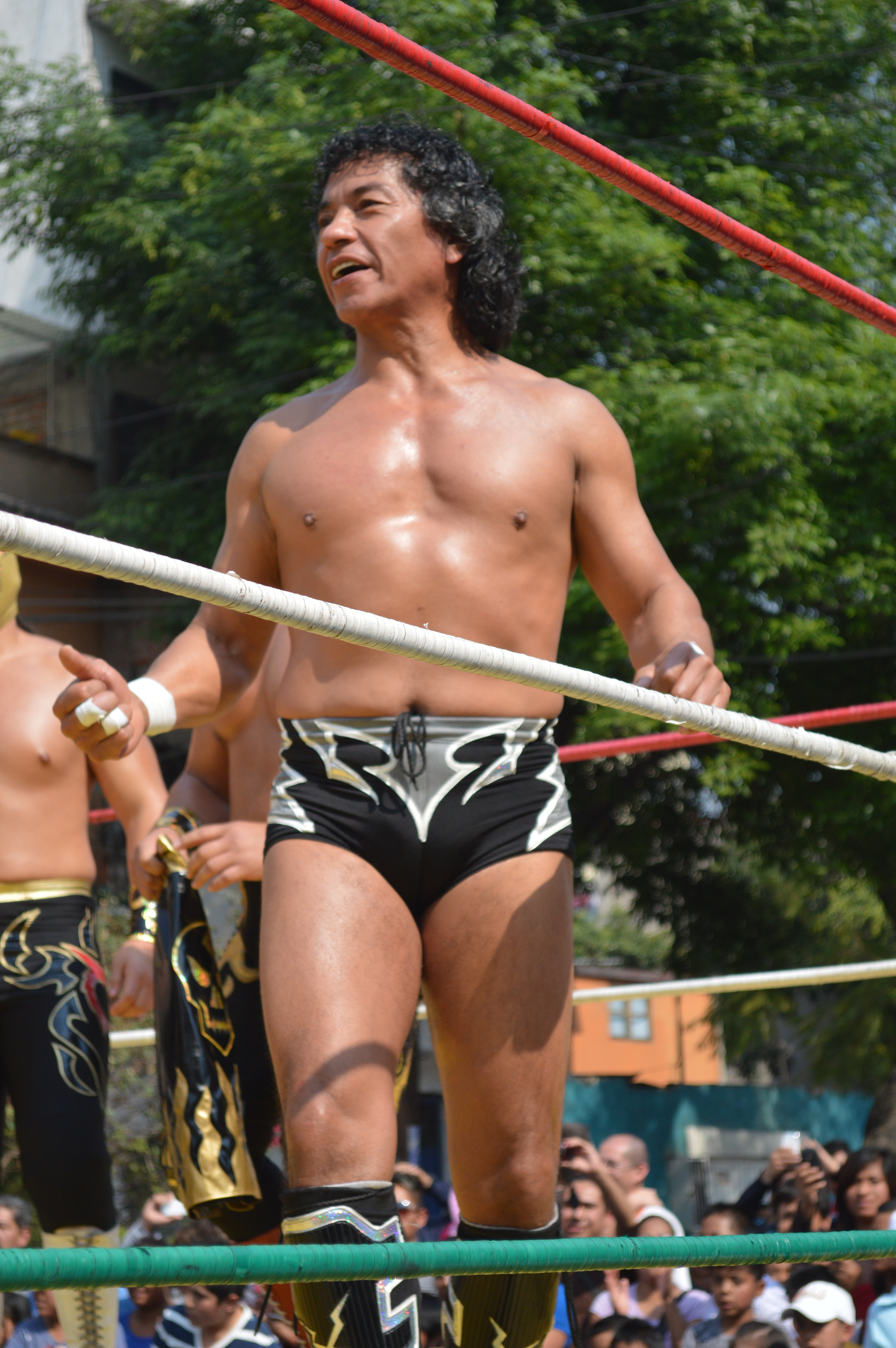
Negro Casas, who traveled to Japan and lost the championship.

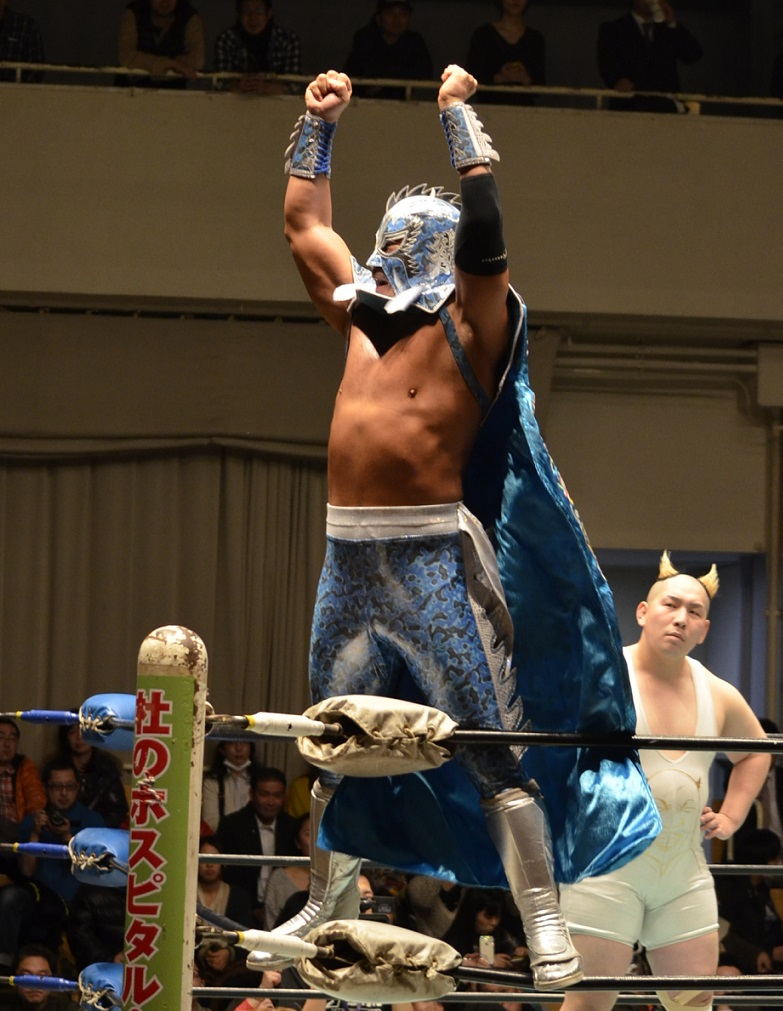
Último Dragón, one of two men to have a one-day reign

Key

Symbol	Meaning
¤	The exact length of at least one title reign is uncertain, so the shortest possible length is used.

Rank	Wrestler	No. of Reigns	Combined days	Ref(s).
1	Karloff Lagarde	3	4,794	
2	Blue Demon	2	1,899	
3	Américo Rocca	3	1,438	
4	Cassandro	1	1,331	
5	Mano Negra	2	1,220	
6	Fuerza Guerrera	2	1,037	
7	Alberto Muñoz	1	867	
8	Jack O'Brien	1	805	
8	Gory Guerrero	1	805	
10	El Santo	2	700	
11	La Sombra	2	547	
12	Hajime Ohara	2	542	
13	Akantus	1	524	
14	Lizmark	1	506	
15	Chamaco Valaguez	1	479	
16	YOSSINO	1	456	
17	Judo Suwa	1	454	
18	Mephisto	1	442	
19	Bobby Bonales	1	441	
20	Impostor Jr.	1	310	
21	Kenichiro Arai	2	270	
22	La Fiera	1	268	
23	Fishman	2	248	
24	Negro Casas	1	246	
25	Darkness Dragon	1	236	
26	El Dandy	2	212	
27	Ryo Saito	1	209	
28	Misterioso	1	196	
29	Jushin Thunder Liger	1	183	
30	Mocho Cota	1	181	
31	Susumu Mochizuki	1	126	
32	Águila Solitaria	1	111	
34	Kato Kung Lee	1	106	
34	Solar II	1	106	
35	Shinjiro Otani	2	88	
36	Último Dragón	2	86	
37	Dragon Kid	1	78	
38	Monarca Cruz	1	77	
39	Magno	1	70	
40	The Great Sasuke	1	67	
41	Genki Horiguchi	2	61	
42	Huracán Ramírez	1	50	
43	El Samurai	1	35	
44	Vento Castella	1	33	
45	El Supremo	1	31	
46	Super Delfin	1	21	
47	Ultimo Samuray	1	19	
48	Ricky Marvin	1	17	

== See also ==
- List of National Wrestling Alliance championships
