= El Santo =

Mexican professional wrestler (1917–1984)

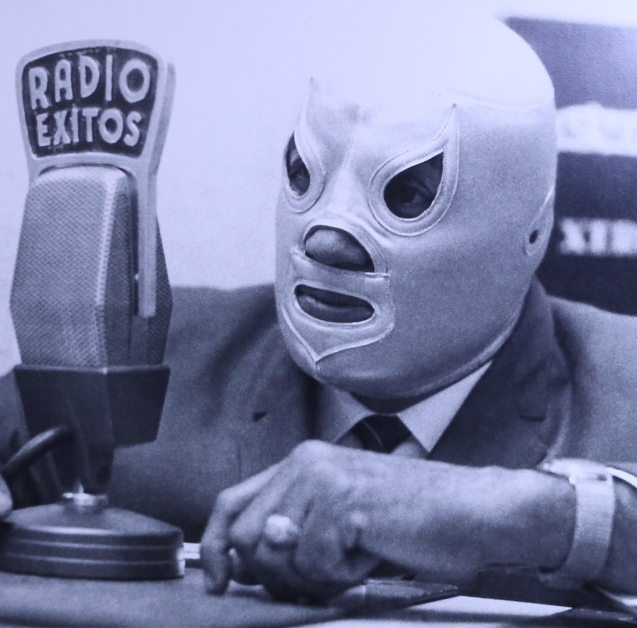
- El Santo, c. 1960s

Personal information
- Born: Rodolfo Guzmán Huerta; 23 September 1917 Tulancingo, Mexico
- Died: 5 February 1984 (aged 66) Mexico City, Mexico
- Spouses: María de los Ángeles Rodríguez (m. 1942; div. 1975) Mara Vallejo Badager (m. 1981–1984)
- Children: 11, including El Hijo del Santo
- Relatives: Black Guzmán (brother); Pantera Negra (brother); Jimmy Guzmán (brother); El Hijo del Santo (son); Axxel (grandson); Santo Jr. (grandson); Rocker II (grandson)

Professional wrestling career
- Ring names: El Demonio Negro; El Enmascarado; Hombre Rojo; Murciélago Enmascarado II; Rudy Guzmán; Ruddy Guzmán; El Santo
- Billed height: 1.75 m (5 ft 9 in)
- Billed weight: 95 kg (209 lb)
- Trained by: Black Guzmán
- Debut: 1934
- Retired: September 12, 1982

Rodolfo Guzmán Huerta (23 September 1917 – 5 February 1984), best known by his ring name El Santo (English: "The Saint"), was a Mexican professional wrestler and actor. He is the most famous and iconic of the Mexican professional wrestlers, and has been referred to as one of "the greatest legends in Mexican sports". His wrestling career spanned nearly five decades, during which he became a folk hero and a symbol of justice for the common man through his appearances in luchador films and comic books telling fictionalized stories of El Santo fighting for justice. He starred or co-starred in at least 53 movies between 1958 and 1982.

During his career, he mainly wrestled for Mexican promotion Empresa Mexicana de Lucha Libre, where he won the Mexican National Light Heavyweight Championship, Mexican National Middleweight Championship, Mexican National Tag Team Championship with Rayo de Jalisco, Mexican National Welterweight Championship, NWA World Middleweight Championship and the NWA World Welterweight Championship. Early in his career, he worked under a variety of ring names and gimmicks both masked and unmasked, before becoming El Santo, El Enmascarado de Plata ("The Man in the Silver Mask"), in 1942.

Santo's brothers were also professional wrestlers, with Black Guzmán being the first to make his debut and later Pantera Negra and Jimmy Guzmán joining them in wrestling as well. Only one of his eleven children followed him into professional wrestling, El Hijo del Santo ("The Son of the Saint") making his debut in 1982. El Hijo del Santo's son made his debut as "Santo Jr." in 2016. Another grandson (not a son of El Hijo del Santo) originally wrestled as "El Nieto del Santo" ("The Grandson of Santo"), but now works under the name Axxel.

Santo is said to have popularized professional wrestling in Mexico just as Rikidōzan did in Japan. He was buried in his silver mask, in one of the biggest funerals in Mexico. Consejo Mundial de Lucha Libre honors him with the annual Leyenda de Plata ("The Silver Legend") tournament. In 2018, WWE inducted Santo into their Hall of Fame's Legacy wing.

== Childhood ==
The fifth of seven children, Rodolfo Guzmán Huerta was born on 23 September 1917, in Tulancingo, Hidalgo, son of Jesús Guzmán Campuzano and Josefina Huerta (Márquez) de Guzmán. Rodolfo's family came to Mexico City in the 1920s, where they settled in the Tepito neighborhood. He practiced baseball and American football, and then became interested in various styles of wrestling and grappling. He first studied Ju-Jitsu and then later competed in amateur wrestling. Rodolfo has a brother who entered the wrestling business as well, Miguel, who is known as Black Guzmán (due to his dark skin).

== Professional wrestling career ==
=== Early career ===
Accounts vary as to exactly when and where he first wrestled professionally, either in Arena Peralvillo Cozumel on 28 June 1934 or at Deportivo Islas in the Guerrero colony of Mexico City in 1935, but by the second half of the 1930s, he was established as a wrestler, using the names "Rudy Guzmán", "Hombre Rojo" ("the Red Man"), "El Demonio Negro" ("The Black Demon") and "Murciélago Enmascarado II" ("The Masked Bat II"). The last name was the same as that of El Murciélago Enmascarado ("The Masked Bat"), and after an appeal by Murciélago to the Mexican boxing and wrestling commission, the regulatory body ruled that Guzmán could not use the name. Ironically, given his enduring status as a cult hero, he exclusively wrestled as a rudo for the first formative decades of his career.

=== El Santo ===
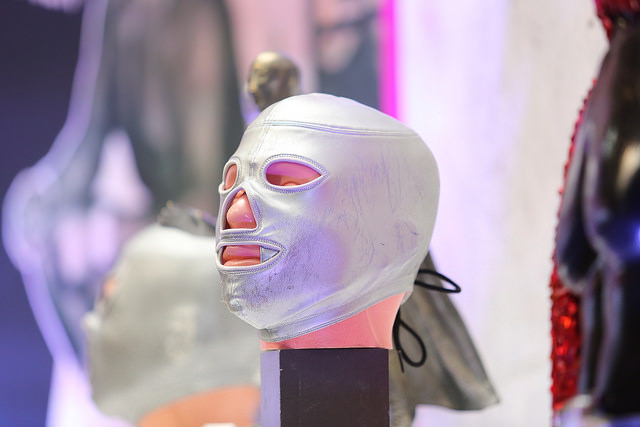
Santo's original mask exhibited during an event at Mexico City, 2016

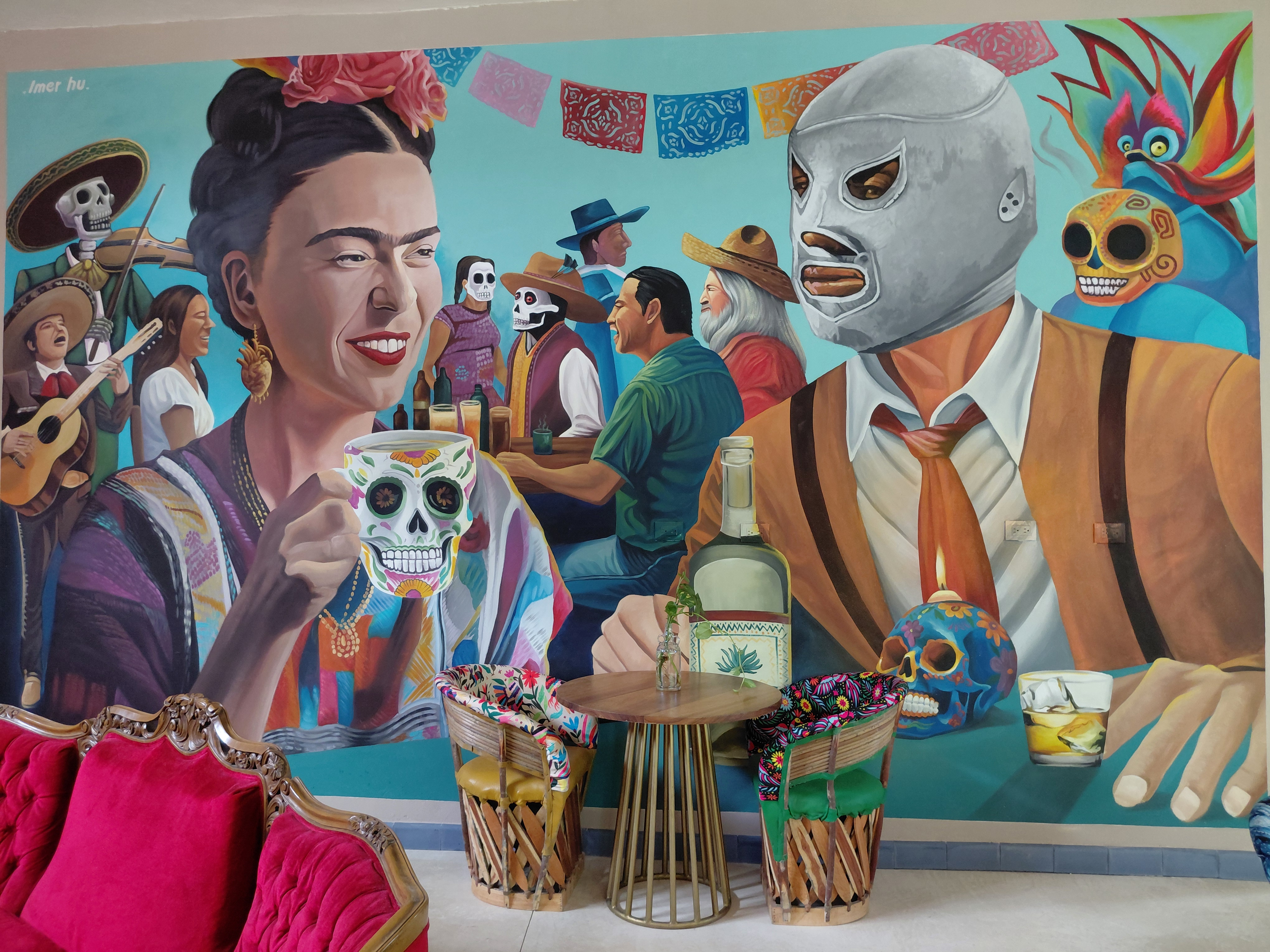
A hand-painted mural of El Santo with Frida Kahlo

In the early 1940s, Guzmán married María de los Ángeles Rodríguez Montaño (Maruca), a union that produced eleven children; including his youngest child Jorge, who also became a famous wrestler in his own right, El Hijo del Santo ("The Son of Santo"). In 1942, Guzmán's manager, Don Jesús Lomelí, was putting together a new team of wrestlers, all dressed in silver, and wanted him to be a part of it. Lomelí suggested three names, "El Santo" ("The Saint"), "El Diablo" ("The Devil") or "El Angel" ("The Angel"), and Guzmán chose the first one due to the contrast with his rudo personality. On 26 July, aged 24, he wrestled at the Arena México for the first time as El Santo, although he later was known simply as "Santo". Under this new name he quickly found his style.

On April 2, 1943, Santo headlined the debut show at the newly built Arena Coliseo in a Mexican National Middleweight Championship match against Tarzán Lopez. He lost the bout, but avenged himself by defeating Lopez in a Luchas de Apuestas at the EMLL 10th Anniversary Show and claiming his hair.

On November 19, 1944, Santo teamed for the first time with Gory Guerrero to form "La Pareja Atómica" ("the Atomic Pair"), a tandem that would go on to achieve legendary status & remain undefeated throughout their tenure together. On May 15, 1946, Santo won the NWA World Welterweight Championship in the final of an internationally themed tournament, triggering a groundswell of fan support behind him as a symbol of national pride (despite his rudo nature).

One of Santo's greatest matches was in 1952, when he fought a tag-team known as Los Hermanos Shadow (which consisted of famed luchadors Blue Demon and the Black Shadow). Santo beat and unmasked Black Shadow in the ring on November 7, 1952, which triggered Blue Demon's decision to become a técnico, as well as a legendary feud between Santo and Blue Demon that culminated in his defeat in a well-publicized series of matches in 1952 and again in 1953. Although they appeared together in a number of action/adventure films, and teamed together semi-regularly in matches from 1963 onwards, their rivalry never really ended in later years since Santo always remembered his defeat at Blue Demon's hands.

In 1957, a pay dispute with EMLL management lead to Santo leaving the company. His debut movie premiered the following year, with the notoriety Santo garnered from it allowing him great autonomy in his wrestling bookings. He returned to EMLL by 1961, and officially became a técnico himself in 1962 as part of an angle where his rudo teammates Los Espantos turned on him.

El Santo was known to never remove his mask, even in private company. When traveling on flights, he made sure to take a different flight than his crew to avoid having them see his face when he was required to remove his mask to get through customs.

=== Retirement ===
By the early 1980s, El Santo slowed down his in-ring activities leading up to his inevitable retirement. His farewell tour was announced for August and September 1982. The first of three events took place on 22 August 1982 at the Palacio de los Deportes in Mexico City. On that night, Santo teamed up with El Solitario to take on Villano III and Rokambole, in a match that naturally saw the legends win. After the match, Villano and Rokambole lifted Santo up on their shoulders as he received the adulation of the sold-out arena. The following Sunday, Santo appeared at Arena México, where he teamed up with Gran Hamada to defeat Villano I and Scorpio.

Santo's last match took place on 12 September 1982, a week before his 65th birthday. In his last ever match, Santo teamed up with Gory Guerrero who came out of retirement to reform "La Pareja Atómica" as they teamed up with Huracán Ramírez and El Solitario. Their opponents included one of Santo's biggest rivals in Perro Aguayo, as well as El Signo, Negro Navarro and El Texano. True to the legend of Santo, he won his last match and retired as the hero he always portrayed in the ring and on the screen. His retirement tour was also used to introduce Santo's son Jorge as the next generation El Santo, as he was ringside at each show wearing the silver mask and being introduced as El Hijo del Santo.

== Film career ==
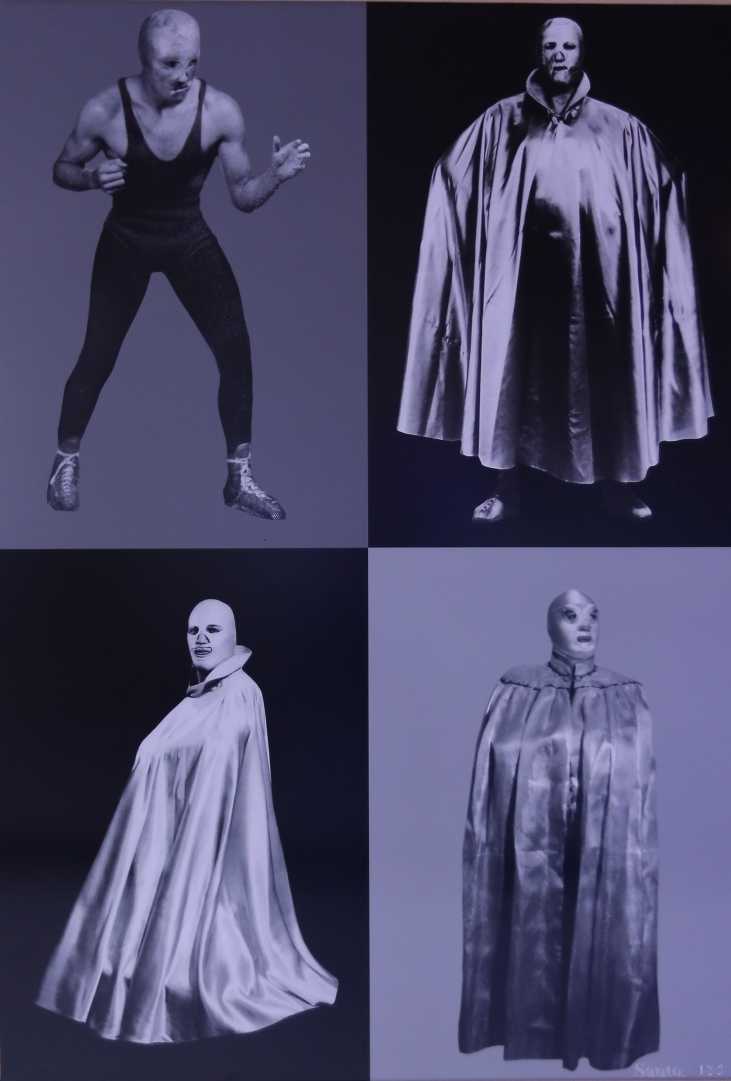
Photographs of El Santo since his beginnings until becoming the "silver masked man"

In 1952, a superhero motion picture serial was made entitled The Man in the Silver Mask, which was supposed to star Santo, but he declined to appear in it, because he thought it would fail commercially. The film was made instead with well-known luchador El Médico Asesino in the lead role, wearing a white mask similar to Santo's silver one. A villain named "The Silver-Masked Man" was introduced into the plot at the last minute, thus the title of the film strangely became a reference to the villain, not the hero.

In 1958, Fernando Osés, a wrestler and actor, invited Santo to work in movies, and although Santo was unwilling to give up his wrestling career, he accepted, planning to do both at the same time. Osés was planning on playing the hero (a masked cop named "El Incognito") in these two films, with Santo appearing as his costumed sidekick, "El Enmascarado". Osés and Enrique Zambrano wrote the scripts for the first two movies, Santo contra el cerebro del mal ("Santo vs. the Evil Brain") and Santo contra hombres infernales ("Santo vs. the Infernal Men"), both made in 1958, and directed by Joselito Rodríguez.

Filming was done in Cuba, and ended just the day before Fidel Castro entered Havana and declared the victory of the revolution. The films apparently could not find a distributor for several years. Santo's film career really took off in 1961 with his third movie Santo Contra los Zombies ("Santo vs. the Zombies"). Santo was given the starring role with this film, and was shown for the first time as a professional wrestler moonlighting as a superhero. When Santo's film career took off in 1961, the producers of the first two films slyly entered Santo's name into the titles and finally got them released.

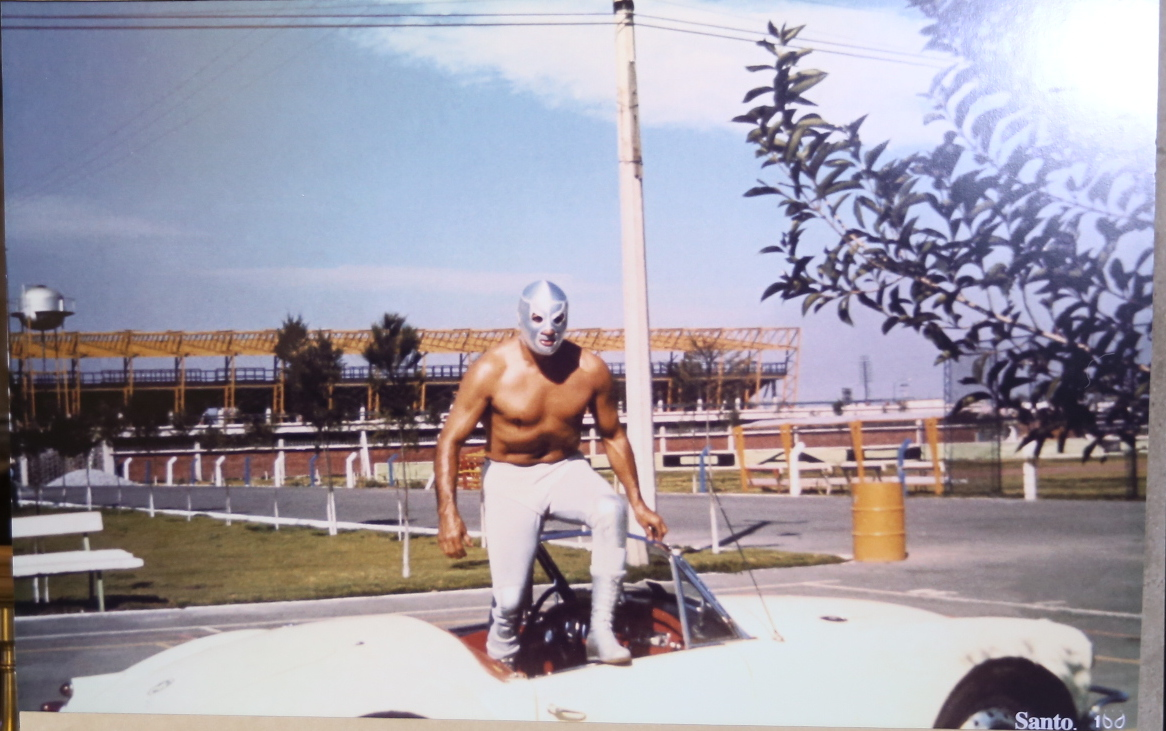
El Santo, c. 1960s

Santo eventually wound up appearing in 53 luchador films in all (two of which were just cameo appearances). Because the films were produced quickly and cheaply, they relied on recycled plot structures and stereotypical characterization. The style of the movies was essentially the same throughout the series, with Santo as a superhero fighting supernatural creatures, evil scientists, various criminals, secret agents and so on. The tones were reminiscent of U.S. B-movies and TV shows, perhaps most similar to the old Republic Pictures serials of the 1940s. In Mexican cinemas, audience participation with the films was common.

His best-known movie outside of Mexico is also considered one of his best, 1962's Santo contra las mujeres vampiro ("Santo vs. The Vampire Women"), which was also featured in an episode of Mystery Science Theater 3000. In this movie, the production values were better, and there was an attempt at creating more of a mythos and background for Santo, as the last of a long line of superheroes. It was an enormous success at the box office. Only four of the 53 Santo films were ever dubbed into English, the other 49 being only available in Spanish. The English-dubbed Mexican films of that time period were imported to the United States through the efforts of K. Gordon Murray who changed the name of Santo to "Samson" for some of his releases. Most of Murray's imported Mexi-films went directly to late-night American TV. Santo's most financially successful film was The Mummies of Guanajuato (1970), which co-starred Blue Demon and Mil Máscaras.

The Santo film series inspired the production of similar series of movies starring other well-known luchadores such as Blue Demon, Mil Mascaras, Superzan, and the Wrestling Women (a.k.a. Las Luchadoras), among others. Santo even co-starred with Blue Demon and Máscaras in several of his movies. Blue Demon invited Santo to co-star with him and Máscaras in Los Campeones Justicieros ("The Champions of Justice"), however, Santo was too busy making other films to participate.

By 1977, the masked wrestler film craze had practically died off, but Santo continued to appear in more films over the next few years. His last film was Fury of the Karate Experts, shot in Florida in 1982, the same year he retired from the ring.

Seventeen years after Santo's death, his real-life son played the lead role in a brand new Santo movie called Infraterrestre ("Inner Earth"), which co-starred Mexican wrestler Blue Panther.

== Other media ==
In 1952, the artist and editor José G. Cruz started a Santo comic book, turning Santo into the first and foremost character in Mexican popular literature, his popularity only rivalled in the 1960s by the legendary Kalimán character. The Santo comic book series (four different volumes) ran continuously for 35 years, ending in 1987.

Santo also became an animated mini-series on Cartoon Network in Latin America, and was called Santo Contra Los Clones. On 27 October 2004, Cartoon Network released an only season of 5 short episodes. Each episode is about 2 minutes long, and they were shown weekly on Wednesday nights at 8:00 PM.

El Santo also inspired the Flash animated series ¡Mucha Lucha! and El Tigre: The Adventures of Manny Rivera. In ¡Mucha Lucha! he's called "El Rey", and is represented as an icon of all positive things.

Santo is immortalized in the rockabilly band Southern Culture on the Skids' 1996 album Santo Swings!/Viva el Santo. Santo is often resurrected in Southern Culture's live performances when an audience member jumps onstage donning Santo's mask. The Latin ska band King Changó released an album titled The Return of El Santo.

Turkish actor Yavuz Selekman portrayed an unlicensed version of Santo in the bootleg Turkish film 3 Dev Adam. This movie is also known in the United States as Captain America and Santo vs. Spider-Man. An unauthorized Santo appeared in three films directed by Lee Demarbre – Jesus Christ Vampire Hunter, Harry Knuckles and the Treasure of the Aztec Mummy, and Harry Knuckles and the Pearl Necklace – in the films, Santo is portrayed by Jeff Moffet.

He also is referred to by Mexican rock band Botellita de Jerez in their song El Guacarrock Del Santo, in which they speak of Santo's victories in the ring and in the movies as well as the great respect he was given as a Mexican movie hero.

Jeffrey Bell, writer/director of the American television series Angel, has stated that El Santo and his luchador brothers were an inspiration for the show's The Cautionary Tale of Numero Cinco episode.

El Santo and several other masked wrestlers make a brief cameo in the Batman '66 comic series, based on the Batman TV series that originally aired in the 1960s. They aid Batman in defeating the evil luchador Bane after Batman cuts Bane off from using Venom to boost his strength.

== Death ==
El Santo removes his mask publicly for the only time in his career, effectively bidding goodbye to his fans. He died a week after the airing of this program.

Just over a year after his retirement (in late January 1984), El Santo was a guest on Contrapunto, a Mexican television program and, without warning, removed his mask just enough to expose his face, in effect bidding his fans goodbye. It is the only documented case of Santo removing his mask in public. Santo died at a hospital from a heart attack (suffered during a stage show he was putting on) on 5 February 1984, at 9:40 p.m., a week after his Contrapunto television appearance. He had been complaining of pain in his arm prior to his death.

In accordance with his wishes, he was buried wearing his famous silver mask. Around 10 thousand people, including Blue Demon and Mil Máscaras, attended his funeral, which was among the largest in the history of Mexico. He was entombed at a crypt on the Mausoleos del Ángel cemetery in Mexico City. It reportedly took hours for Santo's coffin to make it from the funeral parlour into the hearse.

== Legacy ==
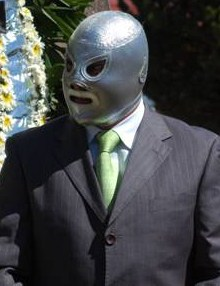
Santo's son, El Hijo del Santo

After his death, a statue of El Santo was erected in his home town of Tulancingo and other statues have been created since then.

Santo's youngest son with his first wife, Jorge carries on the legend of the Silver Mask, wrestling as El Hijo del Santo wearing the silver mask, cape and outfit that is very close to what his father wore. While he is not as big an icon as his father, he is considered a more technically proficient wrestler.

In the early 1960s, a female wrestler called "La Novia del Santo" (Spanish for "the Bride of El Santo") worked the Mexican circuit. Under the silver mask was Irma González, a well-known wrestler who had promised her fiancé that she would stop wrestling, but went back in the ring under a mask when she could not resist the draw of competition. La Novia got El Santo's blessing to use the name and is the only non-family member ever given the right to use the Santo name. Gonzáles only wrestled as "La Novia del Santo" for 7 months until she got married. Later on, another wrestler adopted the "La Novia del Santo" name, but El Santo took action and put an end to the unauthorized use of the name.

In the 1990s, one of El Santo's 25 grandchildren made his professional debut. After gaining some seasoning under different identities, he began working as "El Nieto del Santo" (Spanish for "the Grandson of Santo") during the 2000s. El Hijo del Santo took legal actions to prevent this as he owns all "El Santo" rights when it comes to wrestling, presumably because he himself is planning on letting one of his own sons use the "El Nieto del Santo" name. These days, the grandson of El Santo works as "Axxel" and only uses "El Nieto del Santo" as an unofficial nickname to avoid any legal issues. Axxel uses the same trademark mask, cape and trunk design as El Santo but has incorporated black trim and knee pads, presumably not to infringe on the legal rights of El Hijo del Santo. In August 2012, a court ruled in favor of Axxel, allowing him to again begin working as El Nieto del Santo. In July 2016, another one of El Santo's grandchildren and the son of El Hijo del Santo began working under the name "El Santo Jr."

On 23 September 2016, to honor the 99th birthday of El Santo, Google Doodle ran a special El Santo Google doodle for that day.

He was inducted into the WWE Hall of Fame in 2018 as part of the Legacy Inductees of that year.

El Santo, complete with his silver mask and cape, appears in a few scenes of the 2017 Pixar film Coco as a guest at a party in the Land of the Dead, with actress María Félix as his date.

== Championships and accomplishments ==
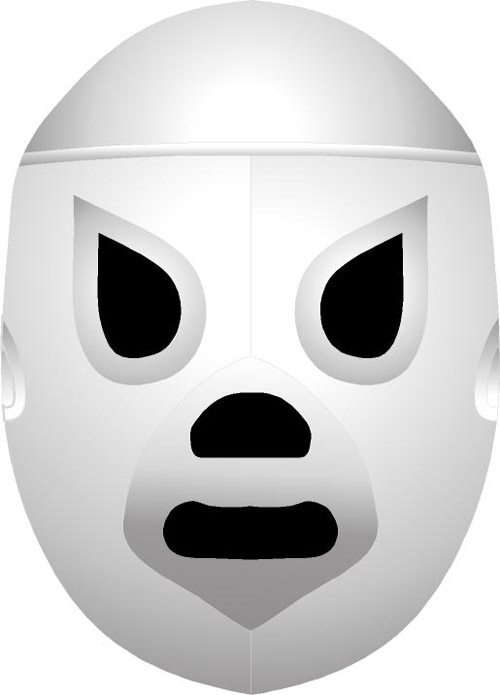

- Empresa Mexicana de Lucha Libre

- EMLL Arena México Tag Team Championship (2 times) – with Rayo de Jalisco (1), and Ray Mendoza (1)
- Mexican National Light Heavyweight Championship (1 time)
- Mexican National Middleweight Championship (5 times)
- Mexican National Tag Team Championship (2 times) - with Rayo de Jalisco
- Mexican National Welterweight Championship (2 times)
- NWA World Middleweight Championship (2 time)
- NWA World Welterweight Championship (2 time)
- Homenaje a Dos Leyendas honoree (1999-2006)

- International Professional Wrestling Hall of Fame

- Class of 2024

- Martial Arts History Museum Hall of Fame

- Class of 2022

- Professional Wrestling Hall of Fame

- Class of 2013

- Wrestling Observer Newsletter

- Wrestling Observer Newsletter Hall of Fame (Class of 1996)

- WWE
  - WWE Hall of Fame (Class of 2018)

== Luchas de Apuestas record ==
Winner (wager)	Loser (wager)	Location	Event	Date	Notes
El Santo (mask)	Cavernario Galindo (hair)	Mexico City	Live event	N/A	
El Santo (mask)	Raúl Torres (hair)	N/A	Live event	N/A	
El Santo (mask)	Gorilita Flores (hair)	N/A	Live event	N/A	
El Santo (mask)	Judas Colombiano (hair)	N/A	Live event	N/A	
El Santo (mask)	Gory Casanova (hair)	N/A	Live event	N/A	
El Santo (mask)	Arturo Chávez (hair)	N/A	Live event	N/A	
El Santo (mask)	Golden Terror (mask)	Guadalajara, Jalisco	Live event	N/A	
El Santo (mask)	La Cebra (mask)	Colombia	Live event	N/A	
El Santo (mask)	La Araña (mask)	Torreón, Coahuila	Live event	N/A	
El Santo (mask)	La Momia (mask)	San Salvador	Live event	N/A	
El Santo (mask)	Cara Cortada (mask)	N/A	Live event	N/A	
El Santo (mask)	Dragón Rojo (mask)	N/A	Live event	N/A	
El Santo (mask)	Dr. X (original) (mask)	N/A	Live event	N/A	
El Santo and Dr. X (original) (mask)	Los Infernales (I and II) (mask)	N/A	Live event	N/A	
El Santo (mask)	Murciélago Velázquez (hair)	N/A	Live event	January 1943	
El Santo (mask)	Bobby Bonales (hair)	Mexico City	EMLL 10th Anniversary Show	24 September 1943	
El Santo (mask)	Bobby Bonales (hair)	N/A	Live event	9 February 1944	
El Santo (mask)	Jack O'Brien (hair)	Mexico City	Live event	8 April 1944	
El Santo (mask)	Enrique Llanes (hair)	Mexico City	Live event	3 July 1949	
El Santo (mask)	Chico Casaola (hair)	Mexico City	Live event	11 February 1951	
El Santo (mask)	Black Shadow (mask)	Mexico City	Live event	7 November 1952	
El Santo (mask)	Monje Loco (mask)	N/A	Live event	15 May 1955	
El Santo (mask)	Halcón Negro (mask)	Mexico City	Juicio Final	3 December 1955	
El Santo (mask)	El Gladiador (mask)	Mexico City	EMLL 23rd Anniversary Show	21 September 1956	
El Santo (mask)	El Tercer Hombre (mask)	Guadalajara, Jalisco	Live event	22 February 1959	
El Santo (mask)	Rubén Juárez (hair)	Mexico City	Live event	1963	
El Santo (mask)	Espanto II (hair)	Mexico City	Live event	1963	
El Santo (mask)	Benny Galant (hair)	Mexico City	Live event	26 April 1963	
El Santo (mask)	Espanto I (mask)	Mexico City	Live event	25 October 1963	
El Santo (mask)	Chino Chou (hair)	Tijuana, Baja California	Live event	17 December 1967	
El Santo (mask)	Dick Angelo (mask)	N/A	Live event	1968	
El Santo (mask)	René Guajardo (hair)	N/A	Live event	10 August 1968	
El Santo (mask)	Jorge Allende (hair)	N/A	Live event	11 August 1968	
El Santo (mask)	Perro Aguayo (hair)	Mexico City	EMLL 42nd Anniversary Show (3)	3 October 1975	
El Santo (mask)	Bobby Lee (mask)	Mexico City	Live event	3 September 1978	
El Santo (mask)	Bobby Lee (hair)	Mexico City	Live event	24 September 1978	
El Santo (mask)	El Remolino (mask)	Ciudad Obregón, Sonora	Live event	1980	
