= Rayo de Jalisco Sr. =

Mexican professional wrestler

Personal information
- Born: Máximino Linares Moreno; November 22, 1932 Mexico City, Mexico
- Died: July 19, 2018 (aged 85) Guadalajara, Mexico
- Family: Rayo de Jalisco Jr. (son)

Professional wrestling career
- Ring name(s): Águila Negra; Dr. Curtis; El Rayo; Mr. Misterio; Rayo de Jalisco; Tony Curtis
- Billed height: 170 cm (5 ft 7 in)
- Billed weight: 93 kg (205 lb)
- Billed from: Jalisco, Mexico
- Trained by: Tony Sugar (brother)
- Debut: February 1950
- Retired: 1993

Máximino Linares Moreno (November 22, 1932 – July 19, 2018) was a Mexican professional wrestler and actor, better known under the ring name Rayo de Jalisco ("The Lightning Bolt from Jalisco"). He is considered to be one of the best professional wrestlers of his generation. Linares' son followed in his footsteps and is working under the name Rayo de Jalisco Jr., wearing the same distinctive black mask with silver lightning bolt on it when wrestling. One of Linares' grandsons is also a professional wrestler, known as "Rayman".

During his career, Linares held the NWA World Middleweight Championship on three occasions as well as the Mexican National Tag Team Championship with lucha libre icon El Santo. He was inducted into the Wrestling Observer Newsletter Hall of Fame in 1996 and the AAA Hall of Fame in 2014. Linares worked for Consejo Mundial de Lucha Libre for a large part of his career and was honored by them in 2013 as part of their annual Homenaje a Dos Leyendas show.

== Early life ==
Máximino Linares Moreno was born on November 22, 1932, in Milpa Alta, Mexico City, Mexico. He was the middle of three Linares brothers, older brother Antonio and younger brother Dionisio.

== Professional wrestling career ==
By the late 1940s, both of Max Linares' brothers had become professional wrestlers, which led to Max himself training for a professional wrestling career under his older brother Antonio. Linares made his wrestling debut in February 1950, under the name "Mr. Misterio". He would later appear in Mexico City under the name "Aguila Negra" ("Black Eagle"). in 1954 Linares began working in the Mexican state of Torreón where he adopted a masked character known as Dr. Curtis, or Doc Curtis. While in Torreón he worked a storyline feud with one of the top names in the state, Orlando Santa Cruz. The feud led to a Lucha de Apuestas or "bet match" between the two on December 12, 1954. After the loss, Linares was forced to remove his Dr. Curtis mask and state his birth name as part of the Lucha de Apuestas tradition. He continued to work as Dr. Curtis and later on "Tony Curtis".

In 1960, he appeared under the name "El Rayo" and in 1962, he finally appeared as "Rayo de Jalisco", wearing his trademark black mask with a lightning bolt across the face. Success soon followed for Rayo, winning the National Wrestling Alliance Middleweight Championship and Occidente Welterweight Championship. Rayo would also win a series of matches against another famous luchador Chino Chow. He unmasked his rival La Bestia (The Beast) in a mask vs. mask match in 1964. Rayo would become the tag team partner of the legendary Blue Demon and was named "The Best Wrestler" of 1963. Rayo feuded with Blue Demon near the end of both their careers. Blue Demon actually came out of retirement to face Rayo in a mask vs mask match. Rayo was defeated, revealing his face to the world as Maximo Linares Moreno.

== Film career ==
Rayo also starred in luchador films along with other famous masked luchadors. His films included; Superzam el Invencible ("Superzam the invincible"; 1971), El Robo de las Momias de Guanajuato ("The Robbery of the Mummies of Guanajuato"; 1972), Vuelven Los Campeones Justicieros ("The Return of the Champions of Justice"; 1972) and El Triunfo de los Campeones Justicieros ("The Triumph of the Champions of Justice"; 1974). In the Campeones Justiceros he worked together with a number of lucha libre legends such as Blue Demon, Mil Máscaras, Tinieblas and El Médico Asesino.

== Family ==
Linares' son followed his father into professional wrestling and became known as Rayo de Jalisco Jr., since Junior has never lost his mask in the ring his real name is not a matter of public knowledge. Rayo de Jalisco Jr. married Josefina Tapia Rosas, who wrestled under the name "Mitzuki Wong". Linares' grandson also became a luchador, for a while known as El Hijo de Rayo de Jalisco Jr. (literally "The Son of Rayo de Jalisco Jr."), but took the name Rayman in 1999. Max Linares' older brother worked under the name "Tony Sugar", while his younger brother was the masked wrestler "Black Sugar".

== Death ==
On July 19, 2018, Linares' family announced that he had died from natural causes at age 85.

== Legacy ==
Rayo is considered a regional hero in the Mexican state of Jalisco. In 1996, he was inducted into the Wrestling Observer Hall of Fame. Rayo de Jalisco Sr. was honored by CMLL at their 2013 Homenaje a Dos Leyendas show on March 15, 2013, recognizing him for his contributions to wrestling over the years. Jalisco was inducted into the Asistencia Asesoría y Administración (AAA) Hall of Fame on August 17, 2014, at Triplemanía XXII.

== Championships and accomplishments ==
- Asistencia, Asesoría y Administración
  - AAA Hall of Fame (Class of 2014)
- Empresa Mexicana de Lucha Libre
  - EMLL Arena México Tag Team Championship (1 time) – with El Santo
  - Mexican National Tag Team Championship (2 times) – with El Santo
  - NWA World Middleweight Championship (3 times)
  - Occidente Welterweight Championship (1 time)
  - Homenaje a Dos Leyendas honoree (2013)
- Wrestling Observer Newsletter awards
  - Wrestling Observer Newsletter Hall of Fame (Class of 1996)

== Luchas de Apuestas record ==
Winner (wager)	Loser (wager)	Location	Event	Date	Notes
Orlando Santana Cruz (hair)	Dr. Curtis (mask)	Torreón, Coahuila	Live event	December 12, 1954	
Rayo de Jalisco (mask)	Chino Chow (hair)	N/A	Live event	N/A	
Rayo de Jalisco (mask)	La Máscara (hair)	N/A	Live event	1963	(Note: Not to be mistaken for La Máscara.)
Rayo de Jalisco (mask)	La Bestia (mask)	Mexico City	Live event	1964	
Rayo de Jalisco (mask)	Guerrero Negro (mask)	N/A	Live event	April 6, 1975	
Rayo de Jalisco (mask)	Mr. Sangre (mask)	N/A	Live event	April 6, 1975	
Rayo de Jalisco and Huracán Ramírez (masks)	Los Hermanos Muerte (masks)	N/A	Live event	September 17, 1978	
Blue Demon (mask)	Rayo de Jalisco (mask)	Monterrey, Nuevo León	Live event	July 30, 1989	

== Filmography ==
- Superzam el Invencible (Superzam the invincible; 1971)
- El Robo de las Momias de Guanajuato (The Robbery of the Mummies of Guanajuato; 1972)
- Vuelven Los Campeones Justicieros (Becoming the Champions of Justice; 1972)
- El Triunfo de los Campeones Justicieros (The Triump of the Champions of Justice; 1974)
