= Karloff Lagarde =

Mexican professional wrestler (1928–2007)

Personal information
- Born: Carlos Delucio Lagarde; July 27, 1928 Zapotlán de Juárez, Hidalgo, Mexico
- Died: August 31, 2007 (aged 79)

Professional wrestling career
- Ring name: Karloff Lagarde
- Billed height: 1.69 m (5 ft 7 in)
- Billed weight: 68 kg (150 lb)
- Billed from: Zapotlán de Juárez, Hidalgo, Mexico
- Debut: 1950

Carlos Delucio Lagarde (July 27, 1928 – August 31, 2007) was best known as Karloff Lagarde, a Mexican professional wrestler, who was immensely popular during the 1960s and 1970s. Through his career had faced most of Mexico's top stars of the 1950s, 1960s and 1970s including professional wrestling legends such as El Santo, El Solitario, Mil Máscaras, Black Shadow, Huracán Ramírez, Gory Guerrero, Ray Mendoza and Perro Aguayo. He was known as the "king of the Welterweight" due to him holding the Mexican National Welterweight Championship four times and the NWA World Welterweight Championship three times in his career. Lagarde teamed up with René Guajardo to form a tag team known as Los Rebeldes, considered to be one of the top five tag teams in history of professional wrestling in Mexico.

== Professional wrestling career ==
Born in Zapotlán de Juárez, Hidalgo, Carlos Lagarde debuted in 1950 in Hidalgo State wrestling under the name Karloff Lagarde. In 1957 he won his first wrestling championship when he defeated Jalisco Gonzalez to win the Mexican National Welterweight Championship. The following year, on January 31, 1958, Lagarde also won the NWA World Welterweight Championship when he defeated Blue Demon for the championship. With both the Mexican National and the NWA World titles in the welterweight division Largade reigned as the king of the welterweights for several years. On March 24, 1961, Lagarde became a triple champion when he defeated El Santo to win the Mexican National Middleweight Championship. His run with the Mexican National Welterweight Championship lasted 1,859 days in total, from 1957 until April 4, 1962, when he lost the title to Blue Demon. In the early 1960s Lagarde had begun teaming up with René Guajardo and by 1962 they were one of the top teams in Mexico at the time and one of the top five Lucha libre teams of all time. They were collectively known as Los Rebeldes ("The Rebels") and headlined shows all over Mexico while wrestling against some of the top Tecnicos (good guys) at the time such as El Santo, Blue Demon and Rayo de Jalisco. They held the Mexican National Tag Team Championship at least once between 1962 and 1967. On April 28, 1962, Lagarde regained the Mexican National Welterweight Championship from Blue Demon, but vacated the title the following year to focus on defending the NWA World Welterweight Championship and teaming with Guajardo. Lagarde's marathon reign as NWA World Welterweight Champion ended on August 5, 1965, 2743 days after winning it, when he lost to Huracán Ramírez. Lagarde regained the title in September and held it for 590 days before Vento Castella defeated him for the belt. Lagarde's third and final reign as NWA World Welterweight champion began only two months after Castella had won the title and lasted for 1,469 days making Lagarde the person to have held the NWA World Welterweight Championship the longest with 4,802 days in total, over 2,000 days more than the second longest. In 1969 Lagarde won the Mexican National Welterweight Championship for a fourth time, defeating longtime rival Huracán Ramírez for the title on September 9, 1969. The rivalry with Ramírez extended into the 1970s with Ramírez regaining the title in 1972 and Lagarde winning his fourth and final title from Ramírez on October 20, 1972. Lagarde's final title run ended on August 11, 1973, when he was defeated by El Marque.

== Movie career ==
When the Lagarde / Guajardo duo was at the top of the Mexican wrestling world the duo appeared in one of the many Lucha films produced at the time. They portrayed the enmascarado (masked wrestlers) Ángel and Satán. two of the main protagonists in the 1964 movie Los endemoniados del ring ("The Demons of the Ring").

== Personal life ==
Lagarde was a second-generation wrestler, although the ring name of his father has not been found documented. His brother wrestled around the same time as Lagarde was active, although the family relationship was not publicly known at the time, his brother wrestled as the masked "Ángel Negro" ("Black Angel"). Lagarde's nephew is also a professional wrestler as well, working under the ring name Karloff Lagarde, Jr. as a tribute to his uncle. It is not an uncommon practice in Mexico to become a "Junior" without being actually the son of the wrestler, instead it is seen as a tribute. Another one of Lagarde's nephews wrestles as Coco Rojo, a wrestling clown.

Carlos Lagarde died on August 31, 2007, following numerous weeks in poor health as a result of a stroke.

== Championships and accomplishments ==
- Empresa Mexicana de la Lucha Libre
  - Mexican National Middleweight Championship (2 times)
  - Mexican National Tag Team Championship (1 time) – with René Guajardo
  - Mexican National Welterweight Championship (4 times)
  - NWA World Welterweight Championship (3 times)
- Wrestling Observer Newsletter
  - Wrestling Observer Hall of Fame (class of 2020)

== Luchas de Apuestas record ==
Winner (wager)	Loser (wager)	Location	Event	Date	Notes
El Solitario (mask)	Karloff Lagarde (hair)	N/A	Live event	N/A	
Halcón de Oro II (hair)	Karloff Lagarde (hair)	Mexico City	Live event	N/A	
Karloff Lagarde (hair)	El Impostor (mask)	Monterrey, Nuevo León	Live event	N/A	
Ray Mendoza (hair)	Karloff Lagarde (hair)	Mexico City	Live event	1965	
Karloff Lagarde (hair)	Cavernario Galindo (hair)	Mexico City	Live event	December 3, 1965	
Jerry London (hair)	Karloff Lagarde (hair)	Mexico City	EMLL 33rd Anniversary Show	September 9, 1966	
Perro Aguayo (hair)	Karloff Lagarde (hair)	Tijuana, Baja California	Live event	June 8, 1974	
