= 1981 in professional wrestling =

1981 in professional wrestling describes the year's events in the world of professional wrestling.

== List of notable promotions ==
These promotions held notable shows in 1981.

Promotion Name	Abbreviation	Notes
Big Time Wrestling	BTW	Renamed to World Class Championship Wrestling (WCCW) the following year.
Joint Promotions	—	
Empresa Mexicana de Lucha Libre	EMLL	
New Japan Pro Wrestling	NJPW	
Universal Wrestling Association	UWA	

== Calendar of notable shows ==
Date	Promotion(s)	Event	Location	Main Event
February 8	UWA	UWA 6th Anniversary Show	Naucalpan, Mexico	El Solitario (c) wrestled Villano III to a timelimit draw In a match for the UWA World Light Heavyweight Championship
April 3	EMLL	25. Aniversario de Arena México	Mexico City, Mexico	Tony Salazar defeated Alfonso Dantés (c) in a best two-out-of-three falls match for the NWA World Light Heavyweight Championship
June 4	NJPW	MSG League	Tokyo, Japan	Antonio Inoki defeated Stan Hansen by count-out
June 4	BTW	Wrestling Star Wars (June)	Dallas, Texas	Fritz Von Erich defeated Gary Hart in a steel cage match
September 18	EMLL	EMLL 48th Anniversary Show	Mexico City, Mexico	Espectro Jr. defeated El Vengador in a Lucha de Apuesta mask vs. mask vs. mask match; El Supremo was also in the match
September 29	Dale Martin Promotions	Mike Marino Memorial Shield	Croydon, England	Mal Sanders defeated Syd Cooper in the tournament final
October 24	BTW	Wrestling Star Wars (October)	Dallas, Texas	Al Madril (c) defeated Bill Irwin via disqualification in a singles match for the NWA Texas Heavyweight Championship
October 4	Joint	Dale Martin Extravaganza	London, England	Big Daddy defeated Giant Haystacks in a "Knockout Only, No Rounds" match
December 4	EMLL	Juicio Final	Mexico City, Mexico	Ringo Mendoza defeated El Faraón in a Lucha de Apuestas, hair vs. hair match
December 10	NJPW	MSG Tag League	Tokyo, Japan	André the Giant and Rene Goulet defeated Antonio Inoki and Tatsumi Fujinami
December 25	BTW	Christmas Star Wars	Dallas, Texas	Big Daddy Bundy defeated Al Madril, Armand Hussein, Bill Irwin, Blue Demon, Carlos Zapata, David Von Erich, Frank Dusek, José Lothario, Kerry Von Erich, Killer Tim Brooks, El Negro Assassino, Richard Blood and Ten Gu in a Two-ring battle royal
(c) – denotes defending champion(s)

== Notable events ==
- June 20 - At the Spectrum in Philadelphia, Pennsylvania, Don Muraco pinned Pedro Morales to become the new WWF Intercontinental Champion.
- July 21 - On WWF Championship Wrestling, Rick Martel and Tony Garea regain the WWF Tag Team Championship by defeating The Moondogs.
- October 13 - On WWF Championship Wrestling, Mr. Fuji and Mr. Saito defeated Tony Garea and Rick Martel to become the new WWF Tag Team Champions, Garea would never again wear any WWF Title in his career.
- November 23 - At New York's Madison Square Garden in a Texas Death Match, Pedro Morales regained the WWF Intercontinental Championship by pinning Don Muraco.

== Accomplishments and tournaments ==
=== AJW ===
Accomplishment	Winner	Date won	Notes
Rookie of the Year Decision Tournament	Chigusa Nagayo		

=== AJPW ===
Accomplishment	Winner	Date won	Notes
Champion's Carnival	Giant Baba	April 23	

=== JCP ===
Accomplishment	Winner	Date won	Notes
NWA United States Championship Tournament	Sgt. Slaughter	October 4	

=== NJPW ===
Accomplishment	Winner	Date won	Notes
G1 Climax	Antonio Inoki	June 4	defeated Stan Hansen in the finals

== Awards and honors ==
=== Pro Wrestling Illustrated ===
Category	Winner
PWI Wrestler of the Year	Ric Flair
PWI Tag Team of the Year	The Fabulous Freebirds (Michael Hayes and Terry Gordy)
PWI Match of the Year	André the Giant vs. Killer Khan
PWI Most Popular Wrestler of the Year	Tommy Rich
PWI Most Hated Wrestler of the Year	Ken Patera
PWI Most Improved Wrestler of the Year	Kevin Sullivan
PWI Most Inspirational Wrestler of the Year	Bob Backlund
PWI Rookie of the Year	David Sammartino
PWI Editor's Award	Bruno Sammartino
PWI Manager of the Year	Lou Albano

=== Wrestling Observer Newsletter ===
Category	Winner
Wrestler of the Year	Harley Race
Feud of the Year	André the Giant vs. Killer Khan
Tag Team of the Year	Jimmy Snuka and Terry Gordy
Most Improved	Adrian Adonis
Best on Interviews	Lou Albano / Roddy Piper

== Tournaments ==
=== IWE ===
Accomplishment	Winner	Date won	Notes
Lou Thesz Cup	No winner		The league was scheduled to go three rounds but never finished due to the closure of IWE

== Births ==
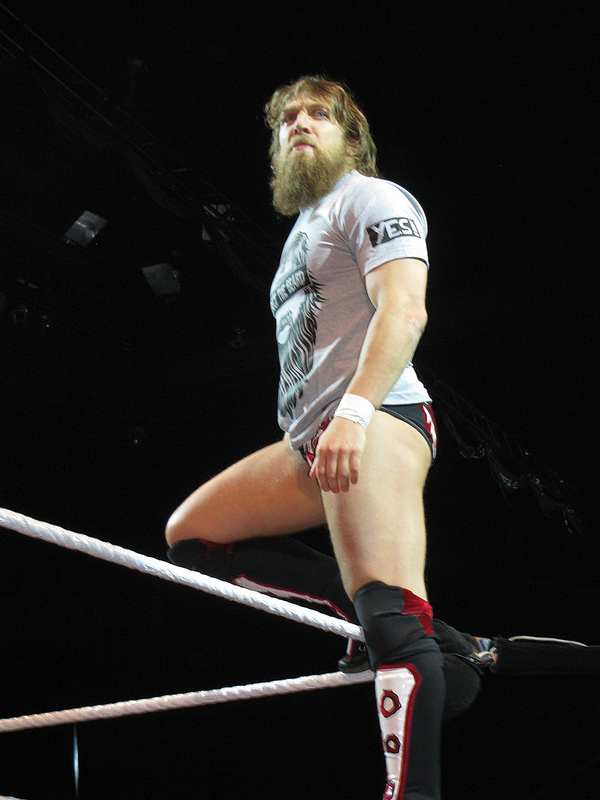
Daniel Bryan

- January 11 - King Mo
- January 12:
  - Jeet Rama
  - Krissy Vaine
- January 13 – Shad Gaspard (died in 2020)
- January 17 - Adam Windsor (died in 2022)
- January 26 – Volador Jr.
- February 9 - Daisuke Sekimoto
- February 14 - Ayako Hamada
- February 15 - Jenna Morasca
- February 18 - Larry Sweeney (died in 2011)
- February 19 – Tye Dillinger
- February 26 - Kaori Yoneyama
- March 2 – Lance Cade (died in 2010)
- March 3 – Justin Gabriel
- March 12 – Hideo Itami
- April 4 – Tigre Uno
- April 28 - Alex Riley
- April 29 - Neil Faith
- May 8 – Stephen Amell
- May 13 – Jimmy Yang
- May 22 – Daniel Bryan
- June 2 – Velvet Sky
- July 8 - Luke Hawx
- July 22
  - Fandango
  - Kenny King
- July 25 – Finn Bálor
- August 14 – Kofi Kingston
- August 19 – Percy Watson
- August 20 – Byron Saxton
- August 21 – Trent Seven
- August 26 - Petey Williams
- September 6 - Chris the Bambi Killer
- September 10 - Rain
- September 13 – Angelina Love
- September 26 – Asuka
- October 7 - Thunder (died in 2016)
- October 9 - Daniel Puder
- October 11 - Arturo Ruas
- November 1 - Hallowicked
- November 3 – Jackie Gayda
- November 10 – Ryback
- November 28 – Erick Rowan
- December 7 - Luster the Legend
- December 11 - Fuego
- December 14 - Johnny Jeter
- December 17 - Tim Wiese
- December 18 - Eddie Kingston
- December 23 - Arik Cannon
- December 25 - Rhaka Khan
- December 31 – Martin Stone

== Debuts ==
- Uncertain debut date

- King Kong Bundy
- El Dandy
- Jake Milliman
- Wendell Cooley
- Itzuki Yamazaki
- Mike Rotunda

- January 10-Fumihiro Niikura
- February 19 - Tarzan Goto
- April 25 - Nobukazu Hirai
- July 12 - Noriyo Tateno
- December 8 - Shunji Takano

== Retirements ==
- Black Shadow (1942–1981)
- Tony Borne (1952–1981)
- Verne Gagne (1949–1981)
- Dutch Savage (1962–1981)
- The Missouri Mauler (1950–1981)

== Deaths ==
- January 24 - Orville Brown, 72
- February 6 - Goga Pehlwan, 43
- April 9 - Wee Willie Davis, 74
- April 12 - Joe Louis, 66
- August 12 – Buddy Austin, 52
- August 24 - Mike Marino, 59
- November 16 - Ali Baba (wrestler), 80
