= Juicio Final (1983) =

Mexican professional wrestling event

- Promotion: Empresa Mexicana de Lucha Libre
- Date: December 9, 1983
- City: Mexico City, Mexico
- Venue: Arena México

Event chronology
← Previous; EMLL 50th Anniversary Show	Next →: 28. Aniversario de Arena México

Juicio Final chronology
← Previous; 1982	Next → 1984

Juicio Final (1983) (Spanish for "Final Judgement" 1983) was a professional wrestling supercard show, scripted and produced by Consejo Mundial de Lucha Libre (CMLL), which took place on December 9, 1983, in Arena México, Mexico City, Mexico. The show served as the year-end finale for CMLL before Arena México, CMLL's main venue, closed down for the winter for renovations and to host Circo Atayde. The shows replaced the regular Super Viernes ("Super Friday") shows held by CMLL since the mid-1930s.

The main event of the 1983 Juico Final was a two-stage match, starting with a Relevos Suicida ("Suicide Relays") where the losing team would be forced to fight each other immediately afterwards, with both risking their hair. Hombre Bala and Masakre defeated Rayo de Jalisco Jr. and El Egipico in the Relevos Suicida. Subsequently, Rayo de Jalisco Jr. pinned El Egipico to win the last match of the night. After unmasking El Egipico revealed that his real name was Jose Luis Hernandez. In the third-to-last match of the show Enfermero Jr. defeated César Curiel, which meant that Curiel had to have all his hair shaved off. The show included four additional matches.

== Production ==
=== Background ===
For decades Arena México, the main venue of the Mexican professional wrestling promotion Consejo Mundial de Lucha Libre (CMLL), would close down in early December and remain closed until either January or February to allow for renovations, as well as letting Circo Atayde occupy the space over the holidays. As a result, CMLL usually held an "end of the year" supercard show on the first or second Friday of December in lieu of their normal Super Viernes show. 1955 was the first year when CMLL used the name "El Juicio Final" ("The Final Judgement") for their year-end supershow.

It is no longer an annually recurring show but is instead held intermittently, sometimes several years apart and not always in the same month of the year. All Juicio Final shows have been held in Arena México in Mexico City, Mexico, which is CMLL's main venue, its "home".

=== Storylines ===
The 1983 Juicio Final show featured seven professional wrestling matches scripted by CMLL with some wrestlers involved in scripted feuds. The wrestlers portray either heels (referred to as rudos in Mexico, those that play the part of the "bad guys") or faces (técnicos in Mexico, the "good guy" characters) as they perform.

== Results ==
No.	Results	Stipulations
1	Estrella Blanca I and Estrella Blanca II defeated Belcebu and El Dandy	Tag team match
2	Cachorro Mendoza, Chamaco Valaguez, and Solar II defeated Jerry Estrada, Talisman, and Tierra Viento y Fuego	Best two-out-of-three falls six-man tag team match
3	Cien Caras, Halcón Ortiz, and Tony Salazar defeated Divino Roy, Herodes, and MS-1	Best two-out-of-three falls six-man tag team match
4	El Supremo, La Fiera, and Sangre Chicana defeated Atlantis, El Jalisco, and Lizmark	Best two-out-of-three falls six-man tag team match
5	Enfermero Jr. defeated César Curiel	Best two-out-of-three falls Lucha de Apuestas, hair vs. hair match
6	Hombre Bala and Masakre defeated El Egipcio and Rayo de Jalisco Jr.	Relevos Suicida, losers advance tag team match
7	Rayo de Jalisco Jr. defeated El Egipico	Best two-out-of-three falls Lucha de Apuestas, mask vs. mask match
