= 1980 in professional wrestling =

1980 in professional wrestling describes the year's events in the world of professional wrestling.

== List of notable promotions ==
These promotions held notable shows in 1980.

Promotion Name	Abbreviation	Notes
All Japan Pro Wrestling	AJPW	
American Wrestling Association	AWA	
Championship Wrestling from Florida	CWF	
Empresa Mexicana de Lucha Libre	EMLL	
New Japan Pro Wrestling	NJPW	
World Wrestling Federation	WWF	Previously known as the World Wide Wrestling Federation (WWWF).

== Calendar of notable shows ==
Date	Promotion(s)	Event	Location	Main Event
April 7	EMLL	24. Aniversario de Arena México	Mexico City, Mexico	El Faraón and Ringo Mendoza defeated Adorable Rubí and El Nazi in a Lucha de Apuestas hair vs. hair match
May 1	AJPW	Champion Carnival	Tokyo, Japan	Jumbo Tsuruta defeated Dick Slater
June 5	NJPW	MSG League	Tokyo, Japan	Antonio Inoki defeated Stan Hansen by disqualification
July 14	AWA	SuperBowl VI	Chicago, Illinois	Verne Gagne defeated Nick Bockwinkel (c) for the AWA World Heavyweight Championship
August 3	CWF	The Last Tangle in Tampa	Tampa, Florida	Harley Race (c) fought Dusty Rhodes to a time-limit draw in a 2-out-of-3 Falls Match for the NWA World Heavyweight Championship with Fritz Von Erich as Special Guest Referee
August 9	WWF	Showdown at Shea	Flushing, New York	Bruno Sammartino defeated Larry Zbyszko in a steel cage match
September 26	EMLL	EMLL 47th Anniversary Show	Mexico City, Mexico	Sangre Chicana (c) wrestled El Fantasma to a no contest for the NWA World Middleweight Championship
December 5	EMLL	Juicio Final	Mexico City, Mexico	Sangre Chicana and Alfonso Dantés defeated El Jalisco and El Cobarde in a Lucha de Apuestas, hairs vs hairs match
December 10	NJPW	MSG Tag League	Tokyo, Japan	Antonio Inoki and Bob Backlund defeated Stan Hansen and Hulk Hogan
(c) – denotes defending champion(s)

== Notable events ==
- April 12 - At the Philadelphia Spectrum, The Wild Samoans became the new WWF Tag Team Champions after defeating Ivan Putski and Tito Santana.
- April 21 - At New York's Madison Square Garden, Ken Patera pinned Pat Patterson to become the new WWF Intercontinental champion.
- May 2 - Bret Hart captured his first Stampede Wrestling North American Heavyweight Championship by beating Leo Burke in Bret's hometown of Calgary, Alberta.
- July 18 - Nick Bockwinkel's 5-year reign as AWA World Heavyweight Champion ended as Verne Gagne pinned him in Chicago, Illinois, to become the new champion. He retired after this bout.
- November 8 - At the Philadelphia Spectrum, Tony Garea and Rick Martel pinned the Wild Samoans to become the new WWF Tag Team Champions.
- December 8 - At New York's Madison Square Garden, Pedro Morales pinned Ken Patera to become the new WWF Intercontinental champion. However this bout originally was going to be aired on the MSG Network but was never shown due to news coverage of the assassination of John Lennon.

== Accomplishments and tournaments ==
=== AJW ===
Accomplishment	Winner	Date won	Notes
Rookie of the Year Decision Tournament	Tomoko Kitamura		

=== AJPW ===
Accomplishment	Winner	Date won	Notes
Champion Carnival	Jumbo Tsuruta	May 1	

=== NJPW ===
Accomplishment	Winner	Date won	Notes
G1 Climax	Antonio Inoki	June 5	

== Awards and honors ==
=== Pro Wrestling Illustrated ===
Category	Winner
PWI Wrestler of the Year	Bob Backlund
PWI Tag Team of the Year	Jimmy Snuka and Ray Stevens
PWI Match of the Year	Bruno Sammartino vs. Larry Zbyszko (Showdown at Shea)
PWI Most Popular Wrestler of the Year	Mr. Wrestling II
PWI Most Hated Wrestler of the Year	Larry Zbyszko
PWI Most Improved Wrestler of the Year	Tony Atlas
PWI Most Inspirational Wrestler of the Year	Junkyard Dog
PWI Rookie of the Year	Terry Taylor
PWI Manager of the Year	Oliver Humperdink

=== Wrestling Observer Newsletter ===
Category	Winner
Wrestler of the Year	Harley Race
Feud of the Year	Bruno Sammartino vs. Larry Zbyszko
Tag Team of the Year	The Fabulous Freebirds (Terry Gordy and Buddy Roberts)
Most Improved	Larry Zbyszko

== Births ==
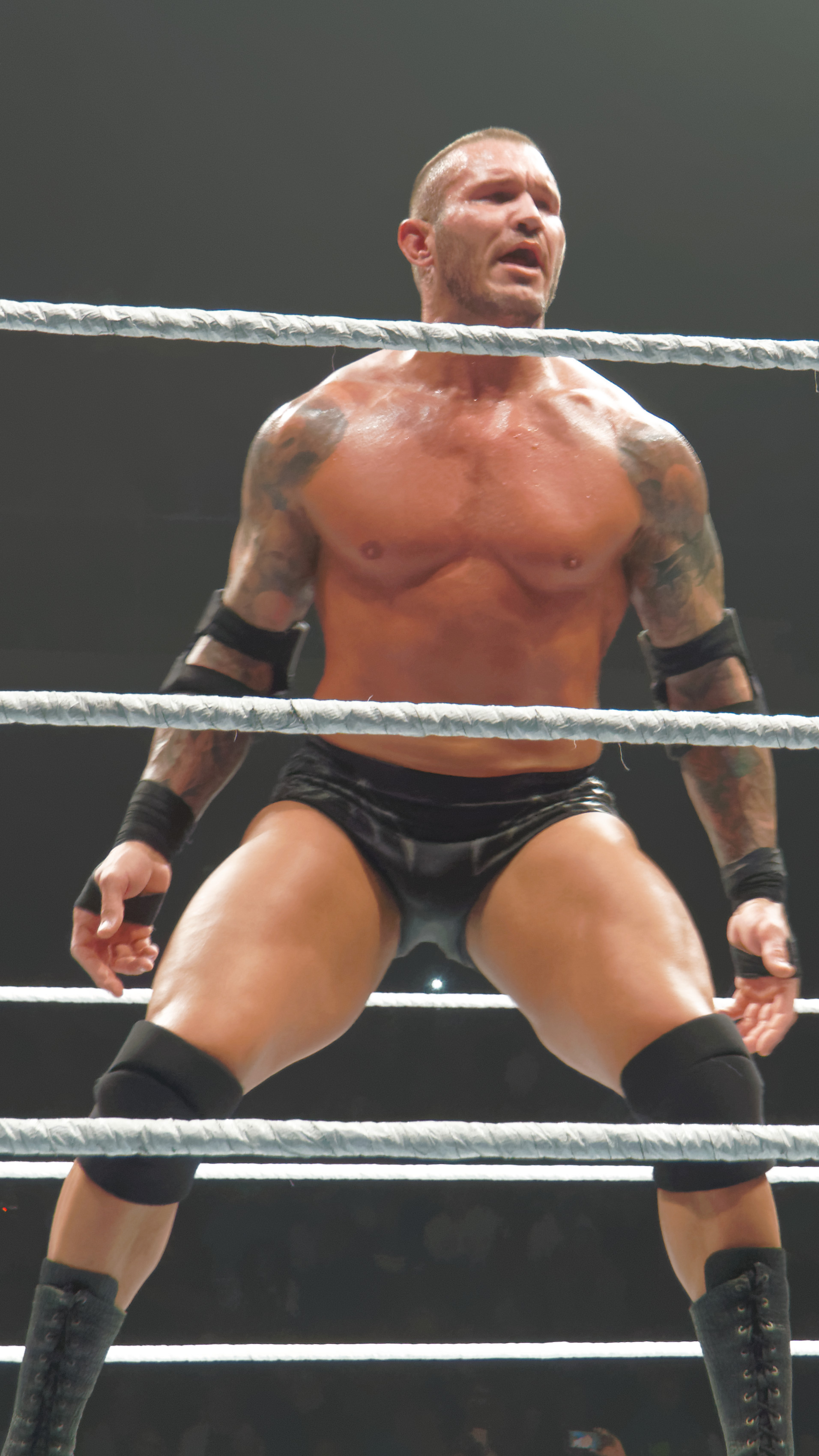
Randy Orton

- January 1 – Sosay
- January 8 – Ricky Marvin
- January 12 – Ares
- January 20 – Karl Anderson
- January 25 – Michelle McCool
- February 2 – Teddy Hart
- February 5 – Kazuhiro Tamura
- February 6 – Konnor
- February 9 – Shelly Martinez
- February 13 – Carlos Cotto
- February 15 – LuFisto
- February 18 – Hideki Suzuki
- February 24 – Shinsuke Nakamura
- February 26 – Yappy
- March 9 – Genba Hirayanagi
- March 19 – Taichi Ishikari
- March 20 – Rohit Raju
- March 28 – Nick Mondo
- April 1 – Randy Orton
- April 2 – Jody Fleisch
- April 7 – David Otunga
- April 10 – Jesse Neal
- April 12 – Masayuki Kono
- April 16 - Paul London
- April 17 – Hartley Jackson
- April 30 – Rob Terry
- May 2 – Caylen Croft
- May 6 – Colt Cabana
- June 1 – Ángel Azteca Jr.
- June 3:
  - Pepper Parks
  - Ryoji Sai
- June 8:
  - Scott Lost
  - Super Dragon
- June 27 - Big Dick Johnson
- July 8 :
  - Brian Danovich (died in 2018)
  - Hikaru Sato
- July 11 – Tyson Kidd
- July 15 – BxB Hulk
- July 16 – Excalibur
- July 17 – Masato Yoshino
- July 27 – Dolph Ziggler
- August 8 – Shayna Baszler
- August 10 – Wade Barrett
- August 19 – Chet Jablonski
- August 28 – Demus 3:16
- August 30 – Alicia Taylor
- September 6 – Jillian Hall
- September 10 – Trevor Murdoch
- September 14 – Dom Travis (died in 2012)
- September 22 – Nick Gage
- September 23 – Romeo Roselli
- October 4:
  - Naruki Doi
  - Sebastian Hackl
- October 8 – The Miz
- October 28 – Christy Hemme
- November 10 – Katarina Waters
- November 12 – Trent Acid (died in 2010)
- November 13:
  - Sara Del Rey
  - Tomomitsu Matsunaga
- November 17
  - Mercedes Martinez
  - Jay Bradley
- November 24 – Beth Phoenix
- November 25 – Josh Mathews
- December 2 – Mario Bokara
- December 4 – Viktor
- December 9 – Escoria
- December 12 – Shockercito
- December 19 – Delirious
- December 26 – Faby Apache
- December 27 – Cesaro
- December 31 – Matt Cross

== Deaths ==
- February 27 - Kola Kwariani, 77
- March unknown date - Otto Kuss, 68/69
- April 5 - Ruffy Silverstein (American wrestler), 66
- June 11 - Wolfgang Ehrl, 68
- September 17 - Big Bad John, 37

== Debuts ==
- Debut date:

- February - Emilio Charles Jr.
- March 1 - Shiniichi Takano
- May 4 - Hiromichi Fuyuki
- May 10 - Lioness Asuka
- August 8 - Dump Matsumoto (All Japan Women's), Chigusa Nagayo (All Japan Women's) and Yuriko Takagi (All Japan Women's)
- August - Bruiser Costa
- October - Tony Anthony
- December 29 - Yoshiaki Yatsu

- Uncertain debut date:

- The Barbarian (wrestler)
- Brad Armstrong (wrestler)
- Psycho Sam Cody
- Wildman Firpo
- Brad Rheingans
- Jimmy Jack Funk
- Gary Royal
- Mike Shaw
- Yukari Omori (All Japan Women's)
- Tarantula (All Japan Women's)
- Crane Yu (All Japan Women's)

== Retirements ==
- Eddie Graham (1947–1980)
- Haystacks Calhoun (1956–1980)
