= CMLL Juicio Final =

Professional wrestling series of shows

Juicio Final; ("Final Judgement")
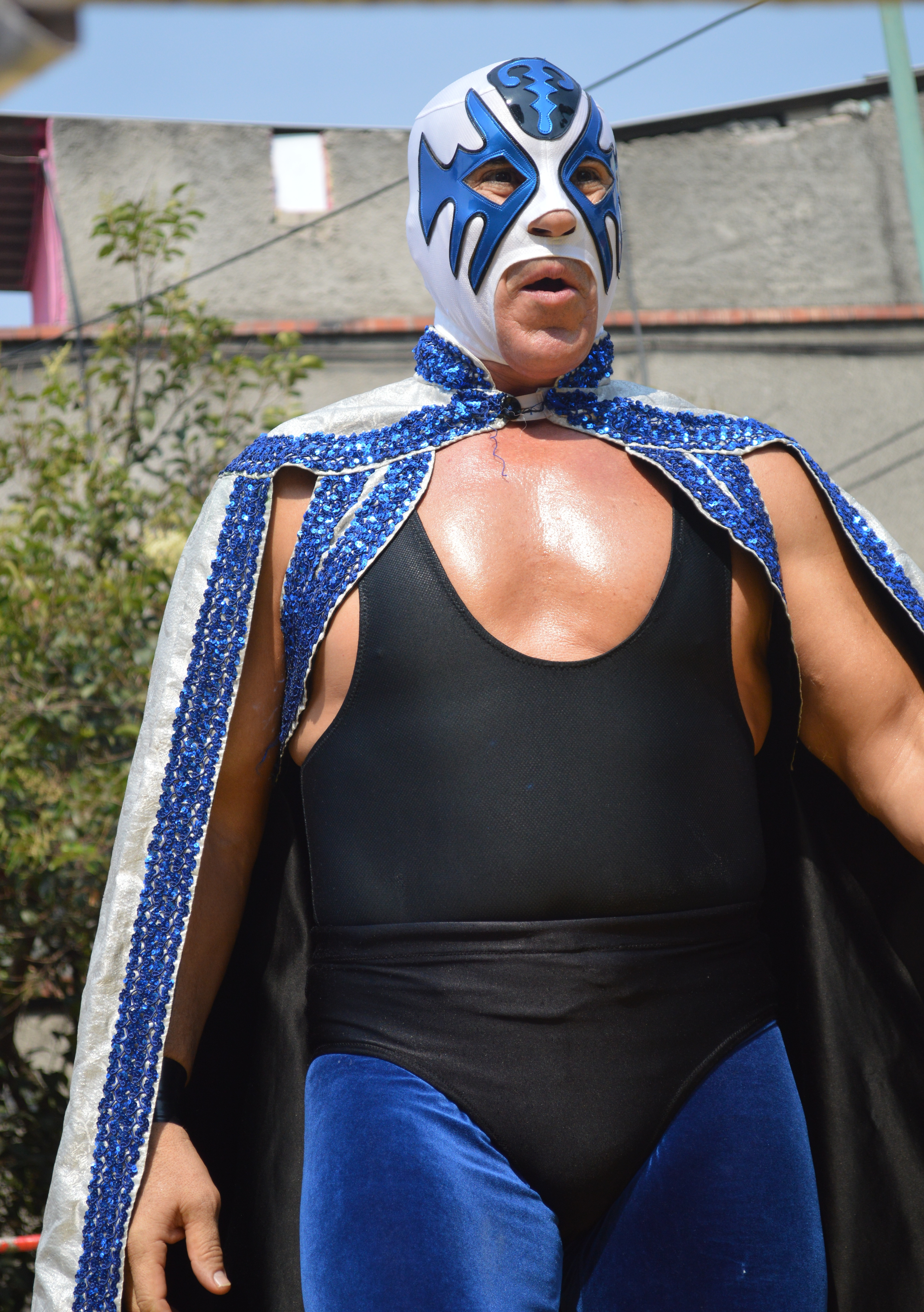
- Atlantis, who won the main event the 2000 Juicio Final show
- Created by: Salvador Lutteroth
- Promotions: Empresa Mexicana de Lucha Libre (1955–1989); Consejo Mundial de Lucha Libre (1990–present)
- First event: 1955
- Last event: 2019
- Signature matches: Luchas de Apuestas; (mask vs. mask); (mask vs. hair); (hair vs. hair)

Juicio Final (Spanish for "Final Judgement") is the collective name of a series of semi-regularly occurring lucha libre, or professional wrestling major show promoted by Mexican professional wrestling promotion Consejo Mundial de Lucha Libre (CMLL). There has been multiple events promoted under the Juicio Final name over the years with the earliest taking place in 1955 and the most recent in 2019. The event has taken place in March, June, August or December, at times replacing the Sin Piedad event in December, and twice it has been promoted a show both as Juicio Final as well as Homenaje a Dos Leyendas: El Santo y Salvador Lutteroth

== Event history ==
For decades Arena México, the main venue of the Mexican professional wrestling promotion Consejo Mundial de Lucha Libre (CMLL), would close down in early December and remain closed into either January or February to allow for renovations as well as letting Circo Atayde occupy the space over the holidays. As a result, CMLL usually held an "end of the year" supercard show on the first or second Friday of December in lieu of their normal Super Viernes show. 1955 was the first year where CMLL used the name "El Juicio Final" ("The Final Judgement") for their year-end supershow.

All subsequent Juicio Final shows have taken place on Friday nights and all in Arena México, CMLL's "home arena". Most have taken place in December, three, two have taken place in March and one in June. The two March Juicio Final events were also promoted under the name Homenaje a Dos Leyendas ("Homage to two legends"). The exact number of matches is unclear as only three matches for the 1991 Juicio Final show were documented and confirmed. The Mini-Estrella division has only been featured in one show while the female division was featured on two shows. (Note: The match statistics are supported by the sources listed in the "Dates, venues and main events table.)

The Juicio Final shows generally feature one or more Lucha de Apuestas, or bet matches, the most prestigious match form in lucha libre, with wrestlers fighting for either their hair or their masks. Rocky Star, All-Star, Huracán Ramírez II, Aníbal, El Supremo, Kahoz, Villano III and Averno have all lost their mask at a Juicio Final and Bestia Salvaje, Kato Kung Lee, Black Magic, El Dandy, El Satánico, Brazo de Plata, Perro Aguayo and Halloween all have been shaved bald as a result of their losses. The Luchas de Apuestas between Villano III and Atlantis was voted the 2000 Wrestling Observer Match of the Year. Juicio Final has hosted only one championship match, which saw the team of Olímpico, Safari and Mr. Niebla defeat Blue Panther, Fuerza Guerrera and El Signo to win the Mexican National Trios Championship. The 2011 Juicio Final event was the only show to host tournament matches as it featured two semi final matches in the Forjando un Ídolo trios tournament.

The first verified Juicio Final show took place in 1955, making it the third oldest regularly held professional wrestling show series, only behind the CMLL Anniversary Shows (1934), Super Viernes (1938), and the Arena Coliseo Anniversary Shows (1944).

== Dates, venues, and main events ==
Year	Date	City	Venue	Main Event	Ref(s).
1955	December 2, 1955	Mexico City, Mexico	Arena Coliseo	El Santo vs. Halcón Negro in a Lucha de Apuestas, mask Vs. mask match	
1956	N/A	N/A	N/A	No specific Juicio Final event identified in sources. (Note: Records have been found of one or more Super Viernes shows taking place in December, but none identify the shows as being a Juicio Final show.)	
1957	N/A	N/A	N/A	No specific Juicio Final event identified in sources.	
1958	N/A	N/A	N/A	No specific Juicio Final event identified in sources.	
1959	N/A	N/A	N/A	No specific Juicio Final event identified in sources.	
1960	N/A	N/A	N/A	No specific Juicio Final event identified in sources.	
1961	N/A	N/A	N/A	No specific Juicio Final event identified in sources.	
1962	N/A	N/A	N/A	No specific Juicio Final event identified in sources.	
1963	N/A	N/A	N/A	No specific Juicio Final event identified in sources.	
1964	N/A	N/A	N/A	No specific Juicio Final event identified in sources.	
1965	December 3, 1965	Mexico City, Mexico	Arena México	Karloff Lagarde vs. Cavernario Galindo in a Lucha de Apuestas, hair Vs. hair match	
1966	December 16, 1966	Mexico City, Mexico	Arena México	El Santo vs. Black Shadow in a singles match	
1967	N/A	N/A	N/A	No specific Juicio Final event identified in sources.	
1968	December 13, 1968	Mexico City, Mexico	Arena México	El Solitario vs. Ray Mendoza in a Lucha de Apuestas, mask Vs. hair match	
1969	December 19, 1969	Mexico City, Mexico	Arena México	Aníbal vs. Red Terror in a Lucha de Apuestas, mask Vs. mask match	
1970	December 11, 1970	Mexico City, Mexico	Arena México	Coloso Colosetti and Rene Guajardo vs. Ángel Blanco and El Solitario in a tag team tournament final	
1971	N/A	N/A	N/A	No specific Juicio Final event identified in sources.	
1972	December 8, 1972	Mexico City, Mexico	Arena México	El Solitario vs. Ángel Blanco in a Lucha de Apuestas, mask Vs. mask match	
1973	N/A	N/A	N/A	No specific Juicio Final event identified in sources.	
1974	December 13, 1974	Mexico City, Mexico	Arena México	Dr. Wagner and Ringo Mendoza vs. Ángel Blanco and Coloso Colosetti in a Lucha de Apuestas, hair Vs. hair match	
1975	December 5, 1975	Mexico City, Mexico	Arena México	Enrique Vera vs. El Halcón Vs. Alfonso Dantés in a Lucha de Apuestas, hair Vs. mask Vs. hair match	
1976	December 10, 1976	Mexico City, Mexico	Arena México	Mano Negra vs. Demonio Blanco in a Lucha de Apuestas, mask Vs. mask match	
1977	December 9, 1977	Mexico City, Mexico	Arena México	El Faraón and Ringo Mendoza vs Joe Palardy and Perro Aguayo in a Lucha de Apuestas, hair Vs. hair match	
1978	December 8, 1978	Mexico City, Mexico	Arena México	Kung Fu vs. El Idolo in a Lucha de Apuestas, mask vs. mask match	
1979	December 7, 1979	Mexico City, Mexico	Arena México	El Faraón and Águila India vs. Sangre Chicana and Tony Salazar in a Lucha de Apuestas, hairs vs hairs match	
1980	December 5, 1980	Mexico City, Mexico	Arena México	Sangre Chicana and Alfonso Dantés vs. El Jalisco and El Cobarde in a Lucha de Apuestas, hairs vs hairs match	
1981	December 4, 1981	Mexico City, Mexico	Arena México	Ringo Mendoza vs. El Faraón in a Lucha de Apuestas, hair vs. hair match	
1982	December 10, 1982	Mexico City, Mexico	Arena México	El Satanico vs. Sangre Chicana in a Lucha de Apuestas, hair vs. hair match	
1983	December 9, 1983	Mexico City, Mexico	Arena México	Rayo de Jalisco Jr. vs. El Egipico in a Lucha de Apuestas, mask vs. mask match	
1984	December 7, 1984	Mexico City, Mexico	Arena México	Máscara Año 2000 vs. Gran Coloso in a Lucha de Apuestas, mask vs. mask match	
1985	December 6, 1985	Mexico City, Mexico	Arena México	El Solar II vs. Belcebu in a Lucha de Apuestas, mask vs. mask match	
1986	N/A	N/A	N/A	No specific Juicio Final event identified in sources.	
1987	December 4, 1987	Mexico City, Mexico	Arena México	Cien Caras vs. Siglo XX in a Lucha de Apuestas, mask vs. mask match	
1988	December 9, 1988	Mexico City, Mexico	Arena México	Fabuloso Blondy (c) vs. Lizmark for the NWA World Light Heavyweight Championship	
1989	December 1, 1989	Mexico City, Mexico	Arena México	Fuerza Guerrera and Rocky Star in a Lucha de Apuesta, mask vs. mask match	
1989	December 8, 1989	Mexico City, Mexico	Arena México	All Star vs. El Hijo del Santo in a Lucha de Apuesta, mask vs. mask match	
1990	December 14, 1990	Mexico City, Mexico	Arena México	Octagón vs. Huracán Ramírez II vs. Fuerza Guerrera in a Lucha de Apuesta, mask vs. mask match.	
1991	December 13, 1991	Mexico City, Mexico	Arena México	Máscara Año 2000 vs. Aníbal in a Lucha de Apuesta, mask vs. mask match.	
1992	December 18, 1992	Mexico City, Mexico	Arena México	Pierroth Jr. vs. El Supremo in a best two-out-of-three falls Lucha de Apuestas mask vs. mask match	
1993	December 3, 1993	Mexico City, Mexico	Arena México	Mano Negra vs. Bestia Salvaje, Lucha de Apuestas, hair Vs. hair match	
1993	December 10, 1993	Mexico City, Mexico	Arena México	Mocho Cota vs Kato Kung Lee, Lucha de Apuestas, hair Vs. hair match	
1994	December 16, 1994	Mexico City, Mexico	Arena México	La Fiera vs Black Magic, Lucha de Apuestas, hair Vs. hair match	
1995	December 1, 1995	Mexico City, Mexico	Arena México	El Satánico vs. Héctor Garza vs. Bestia Salvaje in a Lucha de Apuestas, hair vs. hair match	
1995	December 15, 1995	Mexico City, Mexico	Arena México	Shocker vs. Kahoz, Lucha de Apuestas, mask vs. mask match	
1996	December 6, 1996	Mexico City, Mexico	Arena México	El Hijo del Santo vs. Negro Casas vs. El Dandy, three-way Lucha de Apuestas, mask vs. hair vs. hair match	
1997	December 5, 1997	Mexico City, Mexico	Arena México	Atlantis vs. Blue Panther in the finals of the La Copa Victoria tournament	
1998	December 18, 1998	Mexico City, Mexico	Arena México	Black Warrior, Blue Panther and Dr. Wagner Jr. vs. Los Guapos (Bestia Salvaje, Scorpio Jr. and Zumbido in a tournament final for the vacant CMLL World Trios Championship	
1999	December 3, 1999	Mexico City, Mexico	Arena México	Pierroth Jr. vs. Brazo de Plata, Lucha de Apuestas, hair vs. hair match	
2000	March 17, 2000	Mexico City, Mexico	Arena México	Atlantis vs. Villano III in a Lucha de Apuesta, mask vs. mask match.; Also billed as Homenaje a Dos Leyendas: El Santo y Salvador Lutteroth	
2001	March 30, 2001	Mexico City, Mexico	Arena México	Universo 2000 vs. Perro Aguayo in a Lucha de Apuesta, mask vs. hair match.; Also billed as Homenaje a Dos Leyendas: El Santo y Salvador Lutteroth	
2005	December 12, 2005	Mexico City, Mexico	Arena México	Universo 2000 vs. Halloween in a Lucha de Apuesta, hair vs. hair match.	
2011	June 17, 2011	Mexico City, Mexico	Arena México	La Máscara vs. Averno in a Lucha de Apuesta, mask vs. mask match.	
2012	September 14, 2012	Mexico City, Mexico	Arena México	Rush vs. El Terrible in a best two-out-of three-falls Lucha de Apuestas, hair vs. hair match; Note: CMLL 79th Anniversary Show using the Juicio Final name on the poster	
2014	August 1, 2014	Mexico City, Mexico	Arena México	Rusg vs. Negro Casas in a Lucha de Apuesta, hair vs. hair match.	
2019	May 31, 2019	Mexico City, Mexico	Arena México	Último Guerrero Vs. Máscara Año 2000 in a Lucha de Apuesta, hair vs. hair match.	
