= 1982 in professional wrestling =

1982 in professional wrestling describes the year's events in the world of professional wrestling.

== List of notable promotions ==
These promotions held notable shows in 1982.

Promotion Name	Abbreviation	Notes
Empresa Mexicana de Lucha Libre	EMLL	
Jim Crockett Promotions	JCP	
New Japan Pro Wrestling	NJPW	
Universal Wrestling Association	UWA	
World Class Championship Wrestling	WCCW	Previously known as Big Time Wrestling (BTW).

== Calendar of notable shows ==
Date	Promotion(s)	Event	Location	Main Event
February 14	UWA	UWA 7th Anniversary Show	Naucalpan, Mexico	Abdullah the Butcher and Perro Aguayo defeated Antonio Inoki and Tatsumi Fujinami in a Tag team match
March 15	WCCW	Wrestling Star Wars	Ft. Worth, Texas	Kevin and Kerry Von Erich fought to a double disqualification against Gary Hart and King Kong Bundy in a "Texas Death" steel cage match
April 1	NJPW	MSG League	Tokyo, Japan	André the Giant defeated Killer Khan
April 2	EMLL	26. Aniversario de Arena México	Mexico City, Mexico	Máscara Año 2000 defeated David Morgan (c) in a best two-out-of-three falls match for the NWA World Light Heavyweight Championship
June 4	WCCW	Fritz Von Erich Retirement Show	Irving, Texas	Fritz Von Erich defeated King Kong Bundy (c) in a Falls count anywhere match for the NWA American Heavyweight Championship
July 4	JCP	NWA/WWF World Title Unification	Atlanta, Georgia	NWA World Heavyweight Champion Ric Flair fought WWF World Heavyweight Champion Bob Backlund to a double count-out
August 15	WCCW	Wrestling Star Wars	Ft. Worth, Texas	Ric Flair (c) and Kerry Von Erich wrestled to a draw at one win a piece before being double disqualified in the third fall in a Best two-out-of-three falls match for the NWA World Heavyweight Championship
September 17	EMLL	EMLL 49th Anniversary Show	Mexico City, Mexico	Perro Aguayo defeated Tony Salazar in a best two-out-of-three falls Lucha de Apuestas hair vs. hair match
December 10	EMLL	Juicio Final	Mexico City, Mexico	El Satánico defeated Sangre Chicana in a Lucha de Apuestas, hair vs. hair match
December 10	NJPW	MSG Tag League	Tokyo, Japan	Hulk Hogan and Antonio Inoki defeated Killer Khan and Tiger Toguchi
December 22	UWA	Arena Naucalpan 5th Anniversary Show	Naucalpan, State of Mexico	Los Misioneros de la Muerte (El Signo, Negro Navarro and El Texano) defeated Los Villanos (Villano I, Villano II and Villano III) in a Best two-out-of-three-falls six-man tag team match
December 25	WCCW	Christmas Star Wars	Dallas, Texas	Ric Flair (c) defeated Kerry Von Erich in a no disqualification Steel Cage match for the NWA World Heavyweight Championship
(c) – denotes defending champion(s)

== Notable events ==
- Wrestling's MAIN EVENT magazine hit the newsstands with its first issue
- June 28 - At New York's Madison Square Garden with Ivan Putski as a guest referee, Jules Strongbow and Chief Jay Strongbow bested Mr. Fuji and Mr. Saito to become the New WWF Tag Team Champions. Later the title would be vacant due to a controversial pinfall in which Mr. Fuji's foot was on the ropes.
- July 13 - On WWF Championship Wrestling, Mr. Fuji and Mr. Saito beat the Strongbow Brothers (Jules and Chief Jay) to win the vacant WWF Tag Team Championship.
- October 9 - Nick Bockwinkel pinned Otto Wanz in Chicago, Illinois to become the new AWA World Heavyweight Championship.
- October 26 - The Strongbow Brothers regained the WWF Tag Team Championship by defeating Mr. Fuji and Mr. Saito.

== Accomplishments and tournaments ==
=== AJPW ===
Accomplishment	Winner	Date won	Notes
Champion's Carnival	Giant Baba	April 18	

=== NJPW ===
Accomplishment	Winner	Date won	Notes
G1 Climax	Andre the Giant	June 4	defeated Killer Khan in the finals

== Awards and honors ==
=== Pro Wrestling Illustrated ===
Category	Winner
PWI Wrestler of the Year	Bob Backlund
PWI Tag Team of the Year	Greg Gagne and Jim Brunzell
PWI Match of the Year	Bob Backlund vs. Jimmy Snuka
PWI Most Popular Wrestler of the Year	André the Giant
PWI Most Hated Wrestler of the Year	Ted DiBiase
PWI Most Improved Wrestler of the Year	Barry Windham
PWI Most Inspirational Wrestler of the Year	Roddy Piper
PWI Rookie of the Year	Brad Armstrong
PWI Editor's Award	Lou Thesz
PWI Manager of the Year	J. J. Dillon

=== Wrestling Observer Newsletter ===
Category	Winner
Wrestler of the Year	Ric Flair
Feud of the Year	Ted DiBiase vs. Junkyard Dog
Tag Team of the Year	Stan Hansen and Ole Anderson
Most Improved	Jim Duggan
Best on Interviews	Roddy Piper

== Births ==
- Date of birth uncertain:
  - Vordell Walker
- January 8 - Bad Luck Fale
- January 13
  - Jason Ayers
  - Mason Ryan
- January 25 - Z-Barr (d. 2020)
- January 27 - Zeus
- February 4 - Chris Sabin
- February 9 - Parrow
- February 10 - Vanessa Kraven
- February 14 - Ray (d.2018)
- February 19 - Mascarita Dorada
- February 25 – Maria Kanellis
- March 7 - Cody Deaner
- March 20 - Kasey James
- March 24
  - Epico Colón
  - Jack Swagger
- March 27 - Captain New Japan
- April 2 – Jack Evans
- April 7 – Sonjay Dutt
- April 16 - Joe Doering (d. 2026)
- April 26 – Amazing Red
- April 29 – Aksana
- May 21 - Kota Ibushi
- May 27 – Natalya Neidhart
- June 4 - Alpha Female
- June 6 – Gunner
- June 11 - Egotistico Fantastico
- June 22 - Tetsuya Naito
- July 1 - Carmella DeCesare
- July 8 - Ariel Helwani
- July 11 - Jeff Cobb
- July 13 - Chris Ca$h (d. 2005)
- July 15 - Towel Boy
- July 19 - Daniel Quirk (d. 2005)
- July 28 - Cain Velasquez
- August 3:
  - Damien Sandow
  - Nyla Rose
- August 17 – Cheerleader Melissa
- August 25 – Mictlan
- September 12 - Sal Rinauro
- September 20 – Sexy Star
- September 26 - Damian Priest
- October 1 - Sakamoto
- October 10 - Tony Khan
- October 12 - Tama Tonga
- October 16 - Devon Nicholson
- October 18 - Simon Gotch
- October 28 - Rocky Romero
- November 1 - L. A. Knight
- November 8 – Ted DiBiase Jr.
- November 9 - Nick Mitchell
- November 17 - Mirai (d. 2005)
- December 8 - Jimmy Rave (d. 2021)
- December 17 - Lionheart (d. 2019)
- December 21 – Primo
- December 22 – Místico

== Debuts ==
- Uncertain debut date

- Bob Bradley
- Brickhouse Brown
- Phil Lafon
- Frankie Lancaster
- Sherri Martel
- Mean Mike
- Angelo Mosca Jr.
- Nailz
- Ricky Santana
- Johnny Smith
- Tracey Smothers
- Al Snow
- Steve Williams
- Kazuo Yamazaki
- La Parka
- Shane Douglas

- January 2 - Arn Anderson
- August 10 - Billy Jack Haynes
- October 18 - El Hijo Del Santo
- November - Road Warrior Animal
- December 11 - George South

== Retirements ==
- Buddy Rogers (1939–1982)
- Santo (1934–1982)
- Fritz Von Erich (1953–1982)
- George Gulas (1974–1982)
- Killer Karl Kox (1956–1982)
- Johnny Powers (1960–1982)
- Karl Gotch (1950s – January 1, 1982)
- Mick McManus (1947–1982)
- Mighty Joe Thunder (1957–1982)
- Rip Hawk (1949–1982)

== Deaths ==
- March 6- Bob Konovsky, 47
- June 12 - Peter Maivia, 45
- June 19 - Lionel Baillargeon, 60
- July 25 - Shag Thomas, 56
- July 27 - Kasavubu, 26
- July 29 - Harold Sakata, 62
- August 28 - Bearcat Wright, 50
- September 5 - Dick Lane, 83
- September 24 - Jack O'Brien, 72
- October 5 - Frank Bonnema, 49
- October 24 - Pak Song, 39
- December 2 - Joe Pazandak, 68
- December 12 - Bill Longson, 76
- December 13 - George Gadaski, 52
- December 15 - Chatti Yokouchi, 45
