= Juicio Final (1978) =

Mexican professional wrestling event

- Promotion: Empresa Mexicana de Lucha Libre
- Date: December 8, 1978
- City: Mexico City, Mexico
- Venue: Arena México

Event chronology
← Previous; EMLL 45th Anniversary Show	Next →: 23. Aniversario de Arena México

Juicio Final chronology
← Previous; 1977	Next → 1979

Juicio Final (1978) (Spanish for "Final Judgement" 1978) was a professional wrestling supercard show, scripted and produced by Consejo Mundial de Lucha Libre (CMLL), which took place on December 8, 1978, in Arena México, Mexico City, Mexico. The show served as the year-end finale for CMLL before Arena México, CMLL's main venue, closed down for the winter for renovations and to host Circo Atayde. The shows replaced the regular Super Viernes ("Super Friday") shows held by CMLL since the mid-1930s.

In the main event of the 1978 Juico Final show Kung Fu wrestled El Idolo in a Lucha de Apuestas match, with the loser being forced to umask. Kung Fu won the match, two-falls to one, which meant El Ídolo was forced to unmask and reveal that his real name was Carlos Ramirez, from Guadalajara, Jalisco, Mexico. In the semi-main event Gran Markus defeated TNT, which led to TNT having all his hair shaved off. In the fourth match of the night Pak Choo defeated El Faraón to win the NWA World Light Heavyweight Championship.

== Production ==
=== Background ===
For decades Arena México, the main venue of the Mexican professional wrestling promotion Consejo Mundial de Lucha Libre (CMLL), would close down in early December and remain closed into either January or February to allow for renovations as well as letting Circo Atayde occupy the space over the holidays. As a result, CMLL usually held a "end of the year" supercard show on the first or second Friday of December in lieu of their normal Super Viernes show. 1955 was the first year where CMLL used the name "El Juicio Final" ("The Final Judgement") for their year-end supershow. It is no longer an annually recurring show, but instead held intermittently sometimes several years apart and not always in the same month of the year either. All Juicio Final shows have been held in Arena México in Mexico City, Mexico which is CMLL's main venue, its "home".

=== Storylines ===
The 1978 Juicio Final show featured sixprofessional wrestling matches scripted by CMLL with some wrestlers involved in scripted feuds. The wrestlers portray either heels (referred to as rudos in Mexico, those that play the part of the "bad guys") or faces (técnicos in Mexico, the "good guy" characters) as they perform.

== Results ==
No.	Results	Stipulations
1	Apolo Estrada defeated Leo Lopez	Singles match
2	Kato Kung Lee and Satoru Sayama defeated Adorable Rubí and El Supremo	Tag team match
3	Alfonso Dantés, Sangre Chicana, and Tony Salazar vs. Blue Demon, Cien Caras, and Ringo Mendoza ended in a draw	Best two-out-of-three falls six-man tag team match
4	Pak Choo defeated El Faraon (c)	Singles match for the NWA World Light Heavyweight Championship
5	Gran Markus defeated TNT hair vs. hair	Best two-out-of-three falls Lucha de Apuestas, hair vs. hair match
6	Kung Fu defeated El Idolo	Best two-out-of-three falls Lucha de Apuestas, mask vs. mask match
(c) / – the champion(s) heading into the match
