= EMLL 48th Anniversary Show =

Mexican Professional wrestling show

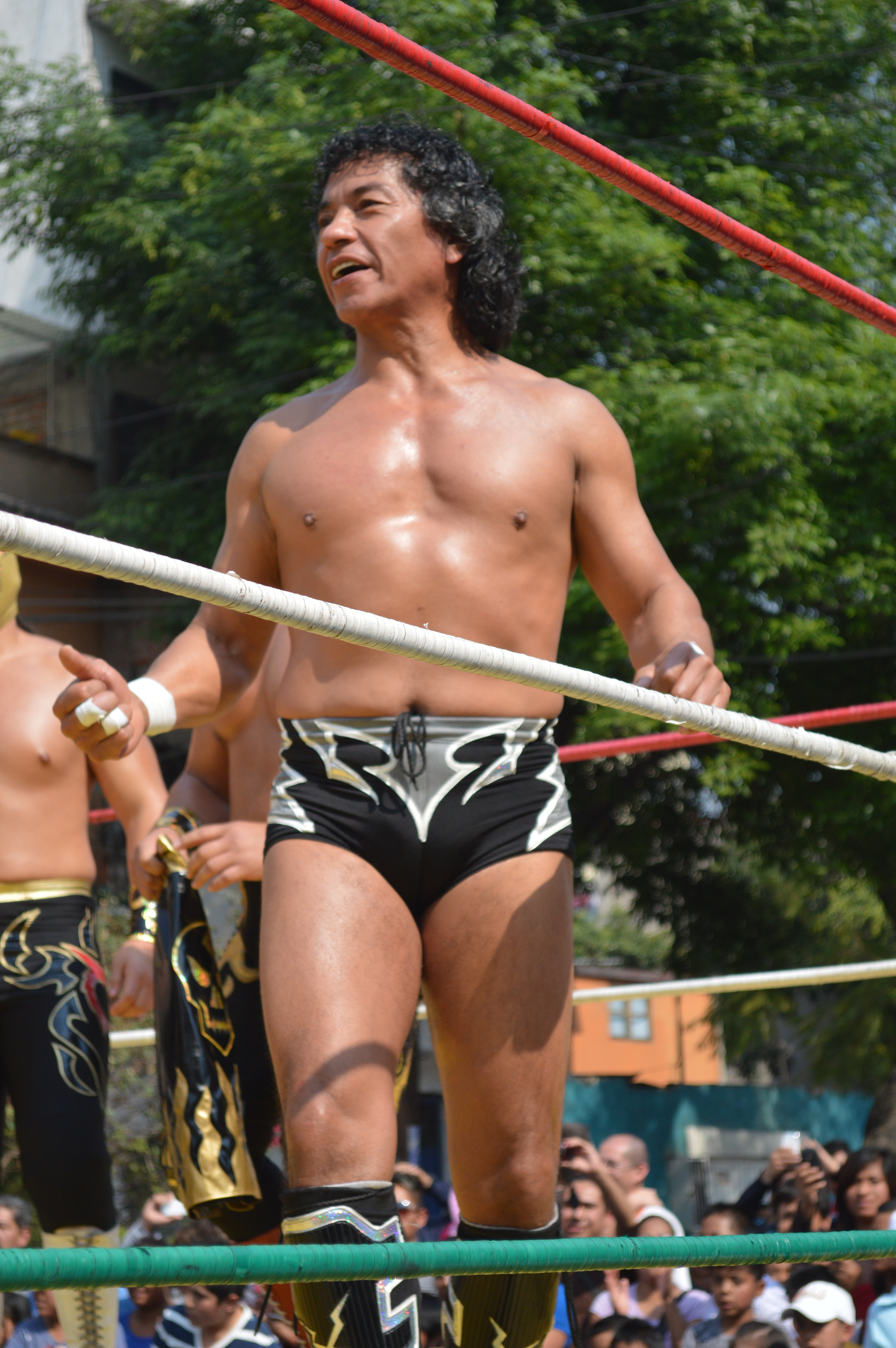
- Negro Casas, one of the few verified competitors on the show
- Promotion: Empresa Mexicana de Lucha Libre
- Date: September 18, 1981
- City: Mexico City, Mexico
- Venue: Arena México

Event chronology
← Previous; 25. Aniversario de Arena México	Next → Juicio Final

EMLL Anniversary Show chronology
← Previous; 47th Anniversary	Next → 49th Anniversary

The EMLL 48th Anniversary Show (Spanish: 48. Aniversario de EMLL) was a professional wrestling major show event produced by Empresa Mexicana de Lucha Libre (EMLL) that took place on September 18, 1981 in Arena México, Mexico City, Mexico. The event commemorated the 48th anniversary of EMLL, which would become the oldest professional wrestling promotion in the world. The Anniversary show is EMLL's biggest show of the year, their Super Bowl event. The EMLL Anniversary Show series is the longest-running annual professional wrestling show, starting in 1934.

== Production ==
=== Background ===
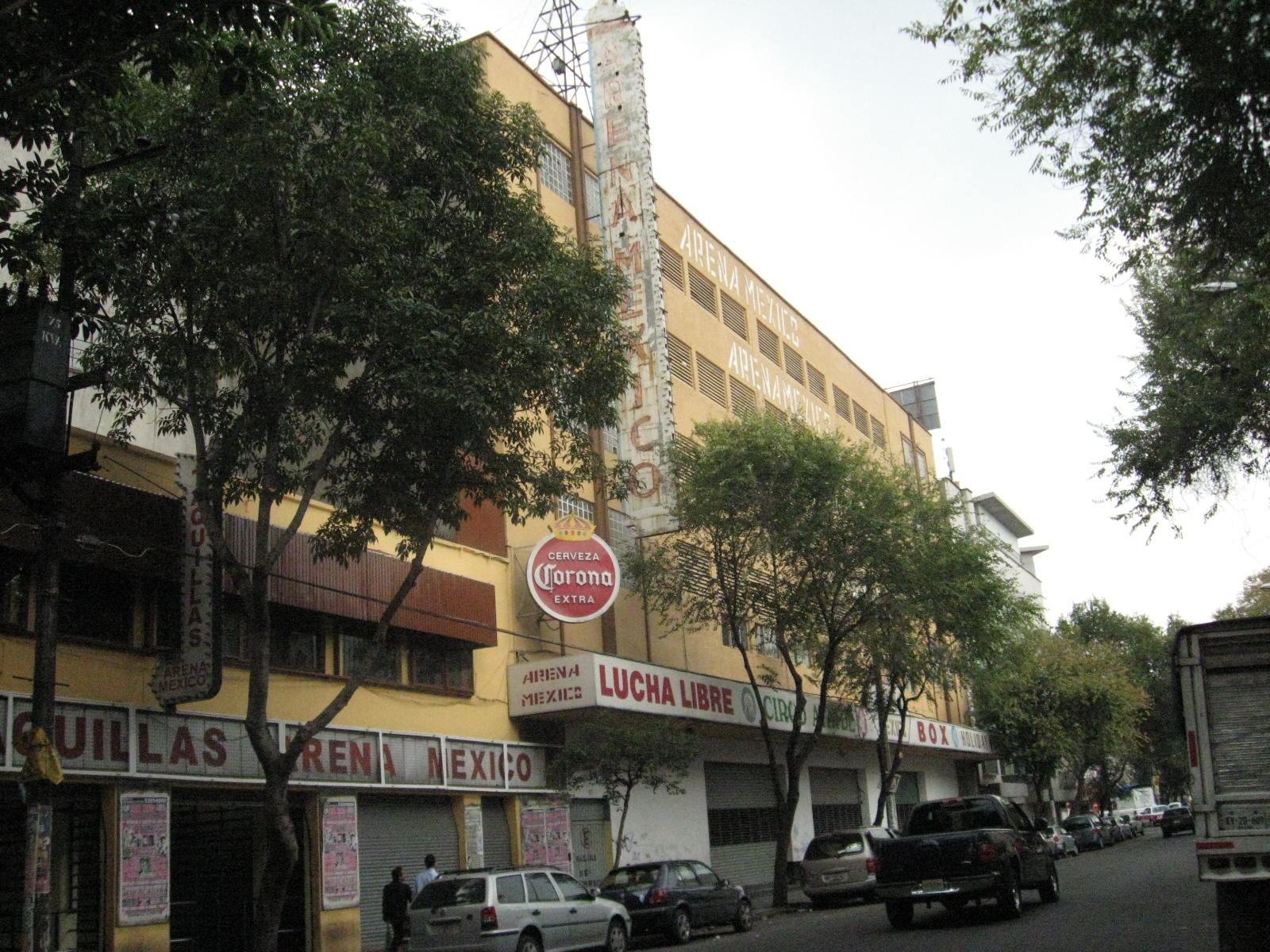
Arena México, CMLL's main venue and location of the Anniversary Show

The Mexican Lucha libre (professional wrestling) company Consejo Mundial de Lucha Libre (CMLL) started out under the name Empresa Mexicana de Lucha Libre ("Mexican Wrestling Company"; EMLL), founded by Salvador Lutteroth in 1933. Lutteroth, inspired by professional wrestling shows he had attended in Texas, decided to become a wrestling promoter and held his first show on September 21, 1933, marking what would be the beginning of organized professional wrestling in Mexico. Lutteroth would later become known as "the father of Lucha Libre" . A year later EMLL held the EMLL 1st Anniversary Show, starting the annual tradition of the Consejo Mundial de Lucha Libre Anniversary Shows that have been held each year ever since, most commonly in September.

Over the years the anniversary show would become the biggest show of the year for CMLL, akin to the Super Bowl for the National Football League (NFL) or WWE's WrestleMania event. The first anniversary show was held in Arena Modelo, which Lutteroth had bought after starting EMLL. In 1942–43 Lutteroth financed the construction of Arena Coliseo, which opened in April 1943. The EMLL 10th Anniversary Show was the first of the anniversary shows to be held in Arena Coliseo. In 1956 Lutteroth had Arena México built in the location of the original Arena Modelo, making Arena México the main venue of EMLL from that point on. Starting with the EMLL 23rd Anniversary Show, all anniversary shows except for the EMLL 46th Anniversary Show have been held in the arena that would become known as "The Cathedral of Lucha Libre". On occasion EMLL held more than one show labelled as their "Anniversary" show, such as two 33rd Anniversary Shows in 1966. Over time the anniversary show series became the oldest, longest-running annual professional wrestling show. In comparison, WWE's WrestleMania is only the fourth oldest still promoted show (CMLL's Arena Coliseo Anniversary Show and Arena México anniversary shows being second and third). Traditionally CMLL holds their major events on Friday Nights, replacing their regularly scheduled Super Viernes show.

=== Storylines ===
The event featured at least three professional wrestling matches with different wrestlers involved in pre-existing scripted feuds, plots and storylines. Wrestlers were portrayed as either heels (referred to as rudos in Mexico, those that portray the "bad guys") or faces (técnicos in Mexico, the "good guy" characters) as they followed a series of tension-building events, which culminated in a wrestling match or series of matches. Due to the nature of keeping mainly paper records of wrestling at the time no documentation has been found for some of the matches of the show.

== Event ==
Not all matches on the 48th Anniversary show are known, the first match that is known to have taken place was a Singles match between the rudo Fuerza Guerrera facing the young tecnico Negro Casas. Casas had not yet competed for two full years, having made his debut in late 1979 while Fuerza Guerrera had a few more years of experience than Casas, but was not yet established as a major name in lucha libre. The men went to a double-countout in a match so lauded that fans threw money into the ring. As a result, Fuerza Guerrera retained his lightweight championship over Negro Casas.

The show also featured two separate Lucha de Apuesta, or bet matches. In the first of the matches unmasked wrestlers Cachorro Mendoza and Mocho Cota both wagered their hair on the outcome of the match. Mendoza defeated the rudo Cota who was shaved bald after the match was over. Elsewhere on the card, all three competitors put their wrestling masks on the line as Espectro Jr., El Supremo and El Vengador ("The Avenger") faced off in a three-way match under Luchas de Apuestas rules. The match saw Espectro Jr. pin El Vengador, forcing him to unmask and state his real name to the crowd in Arena México; Arturo Diaz Rodriguez from Gudalajra, 11 years a wrestler. A hair match pitting Halcón Ortiz against Herodes is sometimes attributed to the show, but actually took place the following month, on 23 October.

== Aftermath ==
Antonio Peña, who wrestled as Espectro Jr., would later retire due to injuries and become a booker with EMLL before breaking away from the promotion and create his own company called Asistencia Asesoría y Administración (AAA) that would go on to become EMLL's main rival in Mexico.

== Results ==
Note: the exact order of the card is unknown.

No.	Results	Stipulations	Times
1	Yanco vs Bufalo Salvaje ended in a draw	Singles match	—
2	Fuerza Guerrera (c) vs Negro Casas ended in a double-countout	Best two-out-of-three falls Singles match for the Distrito Federal Lightweight Championship	—
3	El Faraón & Satánico defeated Ringo Mendoza & Tony Salazar by disqualification	Best two-out-of-three falls elimination tag team match	—
4	Cachorro Mendoza defeated Mocho Cota	Best two-out-of-three falls Lucha de Apuesta hair vs. hair match	—
5	Dos Caras & Fishman defeated Babe Face & Destructor De Idolos by disqualification	Best two-out-of-three falls elimination tag team match	—
6	Espectro Jr. defeated El Vengador, El Supremo was also in the match	Lucha de Apuesta mask vs. mask vs. mask match	—
7	Alfonso Dantes (c) defeated Enrique Vera	Best two-out-of-three falls Singles match for the Mexican National Light Heavyweight Championship	34:23
(c) / – the champion(s) heading into the match
