= EMLL 50th Anniversary Show =

Mexican Professional wrestling show

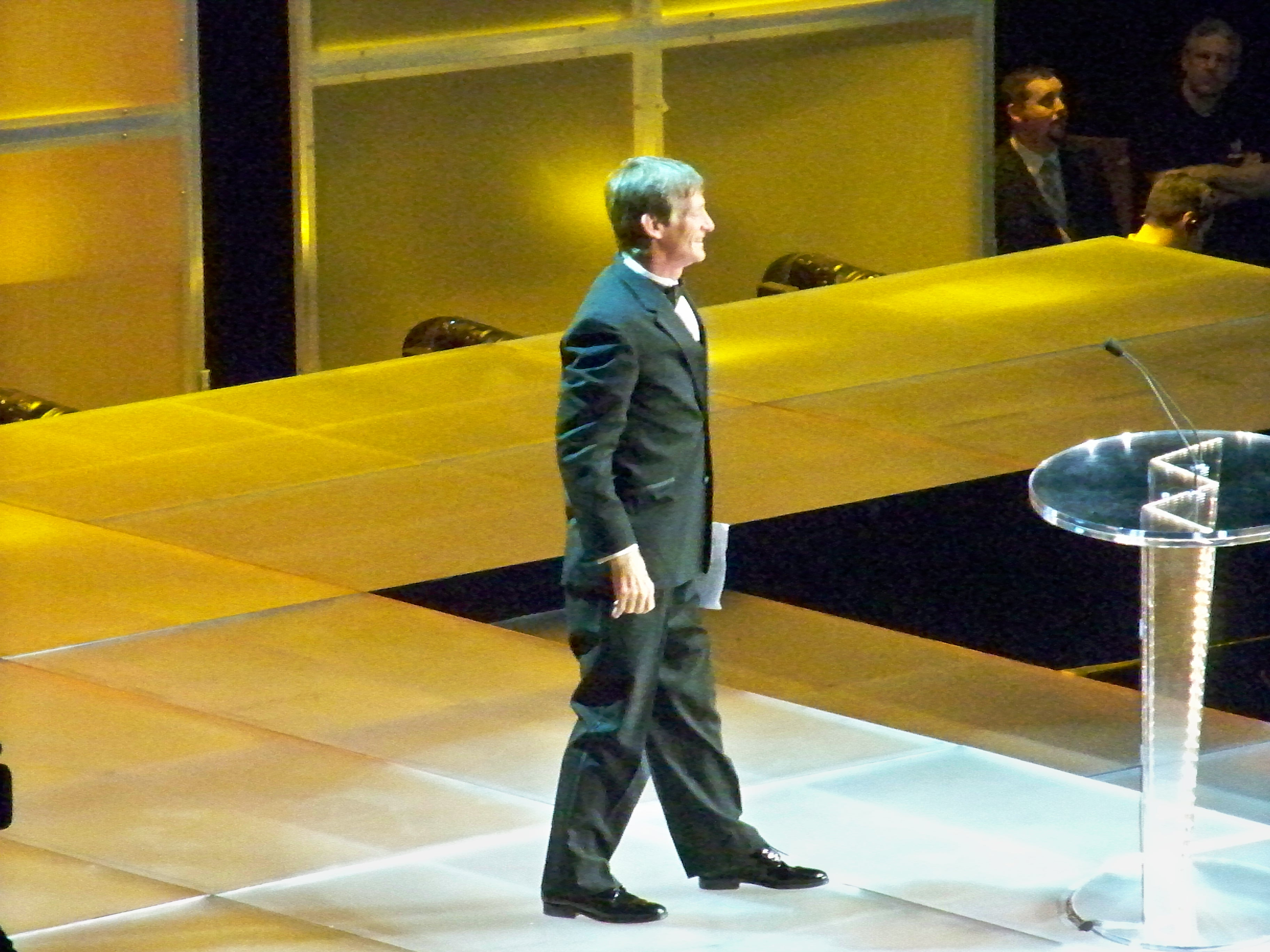
- Kevin Von Erich, made a special appearance for EMLL.
- Promotion: Empresa Mexicana de Lucha Libre
- Date: September 23, 1983
- City: Mexico City, Mexico
- Venue: Arena México
- Attendance: 18,000

Event chronology
← Previous; 27. Aniversario de Arena México	Next → Juicio Final

EMLL Anniversary Show chronology
← Previous; 49th Anniversary	Next → 51st Anniversary

The EMLL 50th Anniversary Show (Spanish: 50. Aniversario de EMLL) was a professional wrestling major show event produced by Empresa Mexicana de Lucha Libre (EMLL) that took place on September 23, 1983, in Arena México, Mexico City, Mexico. The event commemorated the 50th anniversary of EMLL, which would become the oldest professional wrestling promotion in the world. The Anniversary show is EMLL's biggest show of the year, their Super Bowl event. The EMLL Anniversary Show series is the longest-running annual professional wrestling show, starting in 1934.

The main event was the culmination of a long-running, intense storyline between Sangre Chicana and MS-1, with both men putting their hair on the line against the outcome of their Lucha de Apuestas, bet match. The show featured at least three additional matches including Ultraman defending the Mexican National Middleweight Championship against El Supremo.

== Production ==
=== Background ===
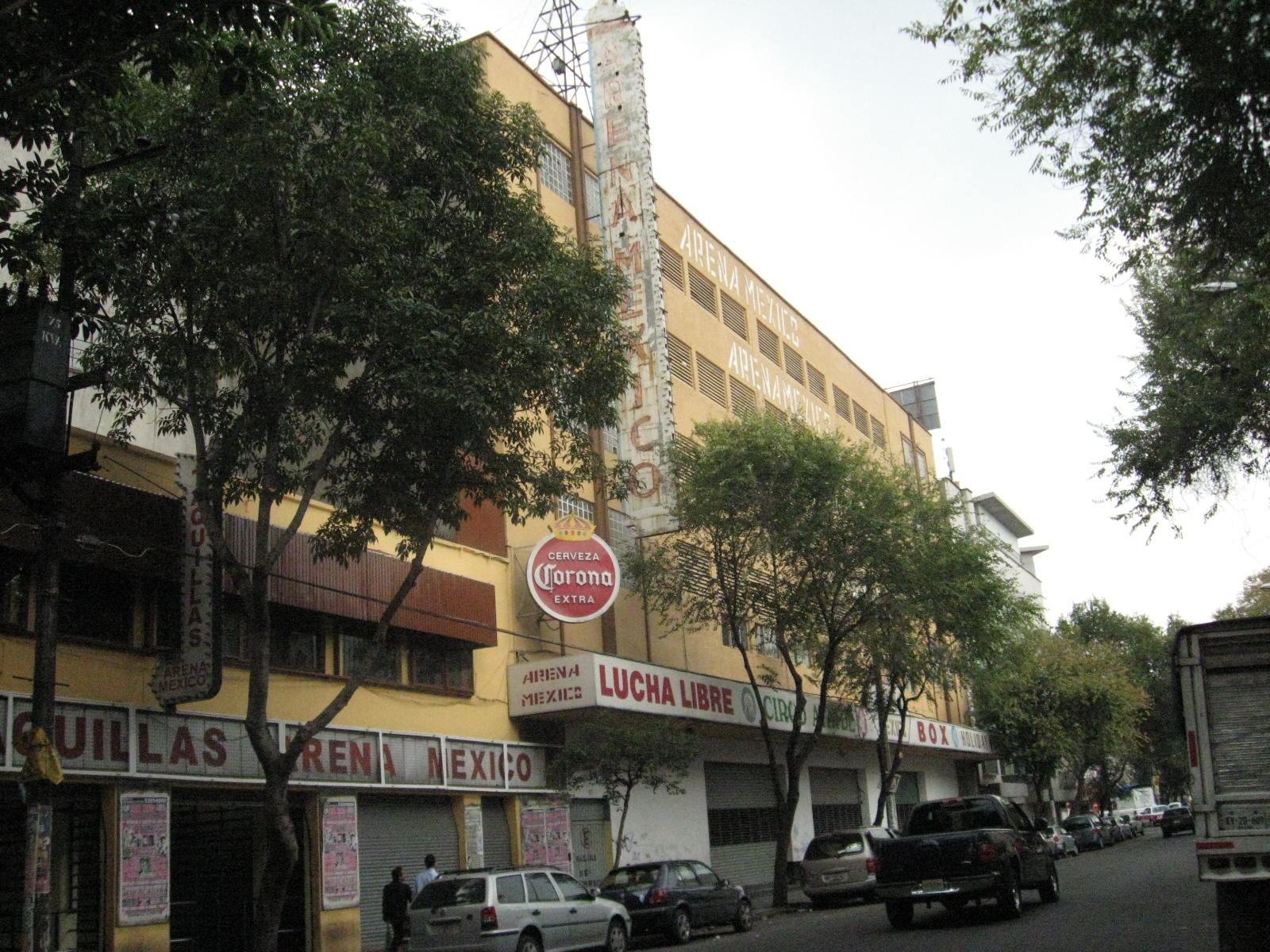
Arena México, CMLL's main venue and location of the Anniversary Show

The Mexican Lucha libre (professional wrestling) company Consejo Mundial de Lucha Libre (CMLL) started out under the name Empresa Mexicana de Lucha Libre ("Mexican Wrestling Company"; EMLL), founded by Salvador Lutteroth in 1933. Lutteroth, inspired by professional wrestling shows he had attended in Texas, decided to become a wrestling promoter and held his first show on September 21, 1933, marking what would be the beginning of organized professional wrestling in Mexico. Lutteroth would later become known as "the father of Lucha Libre" . A year later EMLL held the EMLL 1st Anniversary Show, starting the annual tradition of the Consejo Mundial de Lucha Libre Anniversary Shows that have been held each year ever since, most commonly in September.

Over the years the anniversary show would become the biggest show of the year for CMLL, akin to the Super Bowl for the National Football League (NFL) or WWE's WrestleMania event. The first anniversary show was held in Arena Modelo, which Lutteroth had bought after starting EMLL. In 1942–43 Lutteroth financed the construction of Arena Coliseo, which opened in April 1943. The EMLL 10th Anniversary Show was the first of the anniversary shows to be held in Arena Coliseo. In 1956 Lutteroth had Arena México built in the location of the original Arena Modelo, making Arena México the main venue of EMLL from that point on. Starting with the EMLL 23rd Anniversary Show, all anniversary shows except for the EMLL 46th Anniversary Show have been held in the arena that would become known as "The Cathedral of Lucha Libre". On occasion EMLL held more than one show labelled as their "Anniversary" show, such as two 33rd Anniversary Shows in 1966. Over time the anniversary show series became the oldest, longest-running annual professional wrestling show. In comparison, WWE's WrestleMania is only the fourth oldest still promoted show (CMLL's Arena Coliseo Anniversary Show and Arena México anniversary shows being second and third). Traditionally CMLL holds their major events on Friday Nights, replacing their regularly scheduled Super Viernes show.

=== Storylines ===
The event featured at least four professional wrestling matches with different wrestlers involved in pre-existing scripted feuds, plots and storylines. Wrestlers were portrayed as either heels (referred to as rudos in Mexico, those that portray the "bad guys") or faces (técnicos in Mexico, the "good guy" characters) as they followed a series of tension-building events, which culminated in a wrestling match or series of matches. Due to the nature of keeping mainly paper records of wrestling at the time no documentation has been found for some of the matches of the show.

== Event ==
The first documented match of the show had Mexican National Middleweight Champion Ultraman defend his title against El Supremo in a Best two-out-of three falls match, the standard Lucha Libre format for championship matches. Ultraman had won the title just over a month prior, defeating Águila Solitaria in a tournament final to become the new champion. Ultraman defeated Supremo two falls to one to retain the title. Kevin Von Erich, part of the famous Von Erich Family traveled south from Texas to make a special appearance for the 50th Anniversary show, teaming with EMLL regulars Mascara Año 2000 and Halcón Ortiz as they defeated Herodes, Coloso Colosetti and Pirata Morgan in a Best two-out-of-three falls Six-man tag team match Also on the show Ringo Mendoza, Villano III and Lizmark defeated La Fiera, Mocho Cota and Espectro Jr.in a best two-out-of-three falls six-man tag team match.

The main event of the 50th Anniversary show was the culmination of a very heated, very intense storyline between MS-1 and Sangre Chicana. The matches between the two wrestlers leading up to the event often ended in disqualification for excessive violence and with one or both wrestlers bleeding profusely. After a number of inconclusive matches between the two, both men finally agreed to settle their dispute with a Lucha de Apuestas, or "Bet match" between the two where both men would wager their hair on the outcome of the match. In Lucha Libre high profile Luchas de Apuestas matches are considered more prestigious than championship matches and are regarded as the ultimate "feud settler" between wrestlers. The match between the two was contested under "Best two-out-of-three" falls rules, which is standard for Luchas de Apuestas matches and featured a more brutal style of wrestling than normally associated with Lucha Libre. The two opponents would bleed halfway through the match, as they built the intensity between them up over the first two falls. In the third and deciding fall, Sangre Chicana finally got his revenge on the hated rudo MS-1, pinning him to take the match. Following the victory, Sangre Chicana watched as MS-1 was forcibly shaved bald while in the middle of the ring.

== Aftermath ==
Ultraman reigned as the Mexican National Middleweight Champion until March 4, 1984 when he would lose the championship to Jerry Estrada.

=== Results ===
September 9, 1983

No.	Results	Stipulations	Times
1	Solar II, Aristóteles, and El Egipcio defeated Belcebú, El Hombre Verde, and Fuerza Guerrera	Best two-out-of-three falls six-man tag team match	—
2	Sangre Chicana, El Supremo, and MS-1 defeated Ultramán, El Jalisco, and Tony Salazar	Best two-out-of-three falls six-man tag team match	—
3	El Satánico defeated La Fiera by disqualification	Best two-out-of-three falls match	—
4	Perro Aguayo, Fishman, and Talismán defeated Rayo de Jalisco Jr., Américo Rocca, and Ringo Mendoza	Best two-out-of-three falls six-man tag team match	—
5	Lizmark (c) defeated El Enfermero Jr.	Best two-out-of-three falls match for the NWA World Middleweight Championship	14:10
6	Gran Cochisse defeated Mocho Cota	Best two-out-of-three falls Lucha de Apuestas Hair vs. Hair match	—
(c) / – the champion(s) heading into the match

September 16, 1983

No.	Results	Stipulations
1	Águila India, Jerry Estrada, and Mocho Cota vs. El Egipcio, El Solar, and El Solar II ended in an unknown manner	Best two-out-of-three falls six-man tag team match
2	Cien Caras, Hombre Bala, and Máscara Año 2000 vs. Coloso Colosetti, Herodes, and Popitekus ended in an unknown manner	Best two-out-of-three falls six-man tag team match
3	El Supremo, El Enfermero Jr., and Espectro Jr. vs. Gran Cochisse, Lizmark, and Ultramán ended in an unknown manner	Best two-out-of-three falls six-man tag team match
4	Fishman and Perro Aguayo vs. MS-1 and Sangre Chicana ended in an unknown manner	Tag team match
5	El Satánico defeated La Fiera	Best two-out-of-three falls Lucha de Apuestas Hair vs. Hair match

September 23, 1983

No.	Results	Stipulations
1	Ringo Mendoza, Villano III, and Lizmark defeated La Fiera, Mocho Cota, and Espectro Jr.	Best two-out-of-three falls six-man tag team match
2	Kevin Von Erich, Mascara Año 2000, and Halcón Ortiz defeated Herodes, Coloso Colosetti, and Pirata Morgan	Best two-out-of-three falls six-man tag team match
3	Ultraman (c) defeated El Supremo	Best two-out-of-three falls match for the Mexican National Middleweight Championship
4	Sangre Chicana defeated MS-1	Best two-out-of-three falls Lucha de Apuestas Hair vs. Hair match
(c) / – the champion(s) heading into the match
