= EMLL 49th Anniversary Show =

Mexican Professional wrestling show

- Promotion: Empresa Mexicana de Lucha Libre
- Date: September 17, 1982
- City: Mexico City, Mexico
- Venue: Arena México
- Attendance: 16,000

Event chronology
← Previous; 26. Aniversario de Arena México	Next → Juicio Final

EMLL Anniversary Show chronology
← Previous; 48th Anniversary	Next → 50th Anniversary

The EMLL 49th Anniversary Show (Spanish: 49. Aniversario de EMLL) was a professional wrestling major show event produced by Empresa Mexicana de Lucha Libre (EMLL) that took place on September 17, 1982 in Arena México, Mexico City, Mexico. The event commemorated the 49th anniversary of EMLL, which would become the oldest professional wrestling promotion in the world. The Anniversary show is EMLL's biggest show of the year, their Super Bowl event. The EMLL Anniversary Show series is the longest-running annual professional wrestling show, starting in 1934.

== Production ==
=== Background ===
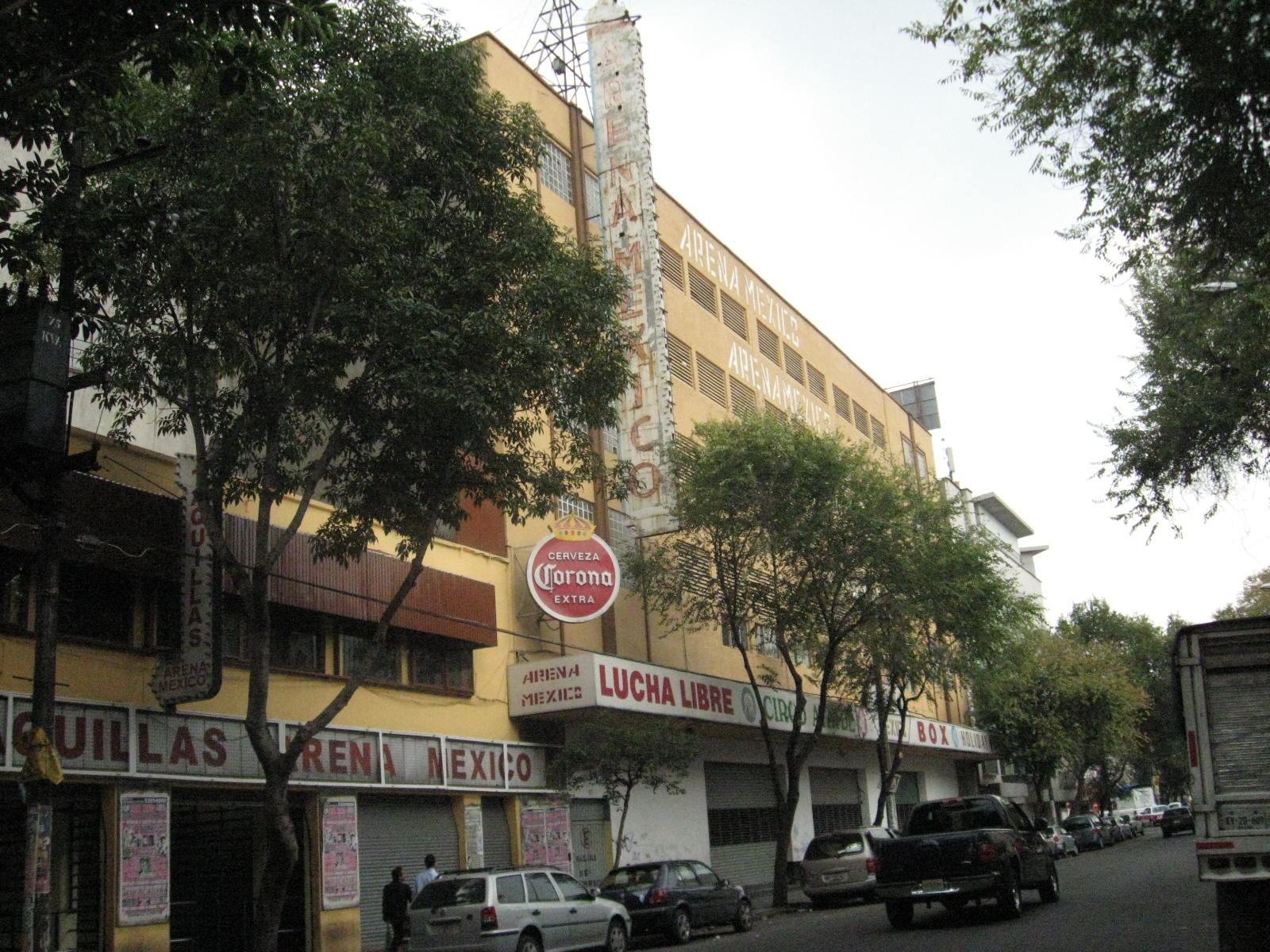
Arena México, CMLL's main venue and location of the Anniversary Show

The Mexican Lucha libre (professional wrestling) company Consejo Mundial de Lucha Libre (CMLL) started out under the name Empresa Mexicana de Lucha Libre ("Mexican Wrestling Company"; EMLL), founded by Salvador Lutteroth in 1933. Lutteroth, inspired by professional wrestling shows he had attended in Texas, decided to become a wrestling promoter and held his first show on September 21, 1933, marking what would be the beginning of organized professional wrestling in Mexico. Lutteroth would later become known as "the father of Lucha Libre" . A year later EMLL held the EMLL 1st Anniversary Show, starting the annual tradition of the Consejo Mundial de Lucha Libre Anniversary Shows that have been held each year ever since, most commonly in September.

Over the years the anniversary show would become the biggest show of the year for CMLL, akin to the Super Bowl for the National Football League (NFL) or WWE's WrestleMania event. The first anniversary show was held in Arena Modelo, which Lutteroth had bought after starting EMLL. In 1942–43 Lutteroth financed the construction of Arena Coliseo, which opened in April 1943. The EMLL 10th Anniversary Show was the first of the anniversary shows to be held in Arena Coliseo. In 1956 Lutteroth had Arena México built in the location of the original Arena Modelo, making Arena México the main venue of EMLL from that point on. Starting with the EMLL 23rd Anniversary Show, all anniversary shows except for the EMLL 46th Anniversary Show have been held in the arena that would become known as "The Cathedral of Lucha Libre". On occasion EMLL held more than one show labelled as their "Anniversary" show, such as two 33rd Anniversary Shows in 1966. Over time the anniversary show series became the oldest, longest-running annual professional wrestling show. In comparison, WWE's WrestleMania is only the fourth oldest still promoted show (CMLL's Arena Coliseo Anniversary Show and Arena México anniversary shows being second and third). Traditionally CMLL holds their major events on Friday Nights, replacing their regularly scheduled Super Viernes show.

=== Storylines ===
The event featured six professional wrestling matches with different wrestlers involved in pre-existing scripted feuds, plots and storylines. Wrestlers were portrayed as either heels (referred to as rudos in Mexico, those that portray the "bad guys") or faces (técnicos in Mexico, the "good guy" characters) as they followed a series of tension-building events, which culminated in a wrestling match or series of matches.

The main event of the show was supposed to see Ric Flair defend the NWA World Heavyweight Championship against Halcón Ortiz, but Flair was unable to work the previous week's CMLL Super Viernes show as well as the Anniversary show due to issues with the visa he needed to allow him to be more than just a tourist.

== Event ==
With Ric Flair being unable to compete EMLL booked Halcón Ortiz to defend his Mexican National Heavyweight Championship against rival Dr. Wagner instead. Ortiz was successful in turning back the challenge of El Galeno del Mal ("The Bad Doctor") in a best two-out-of three falls match. The main event of the show saw both Perro Aguayo and Tony Salazar put their hair on the line in a Lucha de Apuesta, the most prestigious match type in Mexican Wrestling. Aguayo defeated Salazar two falls to one, which meant that Salazar was shaved completely bald after the match.

== Aftermath ==
Halcón Ortiz would hold the Mexican National Heavyweight Championship until August, 1983 when he lost it to Pirata Morgan. Ortiz never got a match for the NWA World Heavyweight Championship.

== Results ==
No.	Results	Stipulations
1	Belcebu and Bello Adan vs. Águila de Plata and El Dorado ended in an unknown manner	Best two-out-of-three falls Tag team match
2	Chamaco Valaguez, Franco Colombo and El Solar II vs. El Salvaje, La Fiera and Mocho Cota ended in an unknown manner	Best two-out-of-three falls six-man "Lucha Libre rules" tag team match
3	Halcón Ortiz (c) defeated Dr. Wagner	Best two-out-of three falls match for the Mexican National Heavyweight Championship
4	Fishman (c) defeated Ringo Mendoza	Best two-out-of-three falls match for the UWA World Light Heavyweight Championship
5	Cesar Curiel, Lizmark and Rayo de Jalisco Jr. defeated Alfonso Dantés and Los Infernales (MS-1 and El Satánico)	Best two-out-of-three falls six-man "Lucha Libre rules" tag team match
6	Perro Aguayo defeated Tony Salazar	Best two-out-of-three falls Lucha de Apuestas hair vs. hair match
(c) / – the champion(s) heading into the match
