= Juicio Final (1981) =

Mexican professional wrestling event

- Promotion: Empresa Mexicana de Lucha Libre
- Date: December 4, 1981
- City: Mexico City, Mexico
- Venue: Arena México

Event chronology
← Previous; EMLL 48th Anniversary Show	Next →: 26. Aniversario de Arena México

Juicio Final chronology
← Previous; 1980	Next → 1982

Juicio Final (1981) (Spanish for "Final Judgement" 1981) was a professional wrestling supercard show, scripted and produced by Consejo Mundial de Lucha Libre (CMLL), which took place on December 4, 1981, in Arena México, Mexico City, Mexico. The show served as the year-end finale for CMLL before Arena México, CMLL's main venue, closed down for the winter for renovations and to host Circo Atayde. The shows replaced the regular Super Viernes ("Super Friday") shows held by CMLL since the mid-1930s.

Only the outcome of three of the six matches have been recorded, with the remaining three only being documented in event posters. The main event match was a Lucha de Apuestas, or "bet match" which saw Ringo Mendoza winning the match by disqualification as El Faraón landed a foul on Mendoza and as a result El Faraón had his hair shaved off. In the semi-main event the tag team of Américo Rocca and Espectro Jr. defeated Cachorro Mendoza and El Alfil in a match that saw Mendoza shaved bald afterwards while El Alfil was forced to unmask and state his birth name, Mario Saucedo, per lucha libre traditions. The fourth match of the night saw Alfonso Dantés retain the Mexican National Light Heavyweight Championship against Máscara Año 2000.

== Production ==
=== Background ===
For decades Arena México, the main venue of the Mexican professional wrestling promotion Consejo Mundial de Lucha Libre (CMLL), would close down in early December and remain closed into either January or February to allow for renovations as well as letting Circo Atayde occupy the space over the holidays. As a result, CMLL usually held a "end of the year" supercard show on the first or second Friday of December in lieu of their normal Super Viernes show. 1955 was the first year where CMLL used the name "El Juicio Final" ("The Final Judgement") for their year-end supershow. It is no longer an annually recurring show, but instead held intermittently sometimes several years apart and not always in the same month of the year either. All Juicio Final shows have been held in Arena México in Mexico City, Mexico which is CMLL's main venue, its "home".

=== Storylines ===
The 1981 Juicio Final show featured six professional wrestling matches scripted by CMLL with some wrestlers involved in scripted feuds. The wrestlers portray either heels (referred to as rudos in Mexico, those that play the part of the "bad guys") or faces (técnicos in Mexico, the "good guy" characters) as they perform.

== Results ==
No.	Results	Stipulations
1^{D}	Scaramouche vs. Celeste ended in an unknown manner	Singles match
2^{D}	El Supremo and Mocho Cota vs. Franco Colombo and Takasugi ended in an unknown manner	Tag team match
3^{D}	La Fiera and El Satánico vs. Lizmark and Tony Salazar ended in an unknown manner	Tag team match
4	Alfonso Dantés (c) defeated Máscara Año 2000	Singles match for the Mexican National Light Heavyweight Championship
5	Américo Rocca and Espectro Jr. defeated El Alfil and Cachorro Mendoza	Best two-out-of-three falls Lucha de Apuestas, hair vs. hair match
6	Ringo Mendoza defeated El Faraón by disqualification	Best two-out-of-three falls Lucha de Apuestas, hair vs. hair match
(c) / – the champion(s) heading into the match; D / – this was a dark match
