= Juicio Final (1979) =

Mexican professional wrestling event

- Promotion: Empresa Mexicana de Lucha Libre
- Date: December 7, 1979
- City: Mexico City, Mexico
- Venue: Arena México

Event chronology
← Previous; EMLL 46th Anniversary Show	Next →: 24. Aniversario de Arena México

Juicio Final chronology
← Previous; 1978	Next → 1980

Juicio Final (1979) (Spanish for "Final Judgement" 1979) was a professional wrestling supercard show, scripted and produced by Consejo Mundial de Lucha Libre (CMLL), which took place on December 7, 1979, in Arena México, Mexico City, Mexico. The show served as the year-end finale for CMLL before Arena México, CMLL's main venue, closed down for the winter for renovations and to host Circo Atayde. The shows replaced the regular Super Viernes ("Super Friday") shows held by CMLL since the mid-1930s.

The main event of the show was a tag team Lucha de Apuestas, or "bet match", where the losing team would be shaved bald as a result. The match saw the team of El Faraón and Águila India defeat Sangre Chicana and Tony Salazar. Afterwards Chicana and Salazar had to submit to having their hair shaved off by the official EMLL barber. In the semi-main event NWA World Light Heavyweight Champion Alfonso Dantés successfully defended the title against UWA World Light Heavyweight Champion Gran Hamada in a match where the UWA championship was not on the line in the match. On the undercard El Satánico defeated Ringo Mendoza to retain the Mexican National Middleweight Championship.

== Production ==
=== Background ===
For decades Arena México, the main venue of the Mexican professional wrestling promotion Consejo Mundial de Lucha Libre (CMLL), would close down in early December and remain closed into either January or February to allow for renovations as well as letting Circo Atayde occupy the space over the holidays. As a result, CMLL usually held a "end of the year" supercard show on the first or second Friday of December in lieu of their normal Super Viernes show. 1955 was the first year where CMLL used the name "El Juicio Final" ("The Final Judgement") for their year-end supershow. It is no longer an annually recurring show, but instead held intermittently sometimes several years apart and not always in the same month of the year either. All Juicio Final shows have been held in Arena México in Mexico City, Mexico which is CMLL's main venue, its "home".

=== Storylines ===
The 1979 Juicio Final show featured sixprofessional wrestling matches scripted by CMLL with some wrestlers involved in scripted feuds. The wrestlers portray either heels (referred to as rudos in Mexico, those that play the part of the "bad guys") or faces (técnicos in Mexico, the "good guy" characters) as they perform.

== Results ==
No.	Results	Stipulations
1	El Nazi defeated El Cobarde	Singles match
2	Adorable Rubí and Divino Roy defeated Bello Greco and Sergio El Hermoso	Best two-out-of-three falls tag team match
3	Huracán Ramírez and Lawrence de Arabia defeated Cesar Valentino and Tony Benetto	Best two-out-of-three falls tag team match
4	El Satánico (c) defeated Ringo Mendoza	Singles match for the Mexican National Middleweight Championship
5	Alfonso Dantés (c) [NWA] vs. Gran Hamada (c) [UWA] ended in a double countout	Singles match for the NWA World Light Heavyweight Championship and the UWA World Light Heavyweight Championship
6	El Faraón and Águila India defeated Sangre Chicana and Tony Salazar	Best two-out-of-three falls Lucha de Apuestas, hair vs hair match
(c) / – the champion(s) heading into the match
