= Juicio Final (1984) =

Mexican professional wrestling event

- Promotion: Empresa Mexicana de Lucha Libre
- Date: December 7, 1984
- City: Mexico City, Mexico
- Venue: Arena México

Event chronology
← Previous; EMLL 51st Anniversary Show	Next →: 29. Aniversario de Arena México

Juicio Final chronology
← Previous; 1983	Next → 1985

Juicio Final (1984) (Spanish for "Final Judgement" 1984) was a professional wrestling supercard show, scripted and produced by Consejo Mundial de Lucha Libre (CMLL), which took place on December 7, 1984, in Arena México, Mexico City, Mexico. The show served as the year-end finale for CMLL before Arena México, CMLL's main venue, closed down for the winter for renovations and to host Circo Atayde. The shows replaced the regular Super Viernes ("Super Friday") shows held by CMLL since the mid-1930s.

The main event of the 1984 year-end show featured a traditional Lucha de Apuestas, or "bet match" where both Máscara Año 2000 and Gran Coloso put their mask on the line in the match. Máscara Año 2000 won two falls to one, forcing Gran Coloso to remove his mask and state his name; Jose Luis Gazca. In the semi-main event, the team of Gran Cochisse defeated Mocho Cota defeated, leading to Mocho Cota having all his hair shaved off afterwards. The fourth match, a tag team match with Cien Caras and Villano III facing El Faraón & Perro Aguayo, ended in a disqualification due to Faraón and Aguayo taking Villano III's mask. After the show all four wrestlers were suspended from working in EMLL for 3 months due to excessive violence. The show featured three additional matches.

== Production ==
=== Background ===
For decades Arena México, the main venue of the Mexican professional wrestling promotion Consejo Mundial de Lucha Libre (CMLL), would close down in early December and remain closed into either January or February to allow for renovations as well as letting Circo Atayde occupy the space over the holidays. As a result, CMLL usually held a "end of the year" supercard show on the first or second Friday of December in lieu of their normal Super Viernes show. 1955 was the first year where CMLL used the name "El Juicio Final" ("The Final Judgement") for their year-end supershow. It is no longer an annually recurring show, but instead held intermittently sometimes several years apart and not always in the same month of the year either. All Juicio Final shows have been held in Arena México in Mexico City, Mexico which is CMLL's main venue, its "home".

=== Storylines ===
The 1984 Juicio Final show featured six professional wrestling matches scripted by CMLL with some wrestlers involved in scripted feuds. The wrestlers portray either heels (referred to as rudos in Mexico, those that play the part of the "bad guys") or faces (técnicos in Mexico, the "good guy" characters) as they perform.

== Results ==
No.	Results	Stipulations
1	Estrella Blanca I, Estrella Blanca II, and Solar II defeated Franco Colombo, Lemus II, and Panico	Best two-out-of-three falls six-man tag team match
2	Espectro Jr., Herodes, and MS-1 defeated Américo Rocca, Cachorro Mendoza, and Tony Salazar	Best two-out-of-three falls six-man tag team match
3	El Hijo del Santo, Hombre Bala, and Javier Cruz defeated El Supremo, Fuerza Guerrera, and Talisman	Best two-out-of-three falls six-man tag team match
4	Cien Caras and Villano III defeated El Faraón and Perro Aguayo by disqualification	Tag team match
5	Gran Cochisse defeated Mocho Cota	Best two-out-of-three falls Lucha de Apuestas, hair vs. hair match
6	Máscara Año 2000 defeated Gran Coloso	Best two-out-of-three falls Lucha de Apuestas, mask vs. mask match
