= Juicio Final (1986) =

Mexican professional wrestling event

Juicio Final (1987)
- Promotion: Empresa Mexicana de Lucha Libre
- Date: December 5, 1986
- City: Mexico City, Mexico
- Venue: Arena México

Event chronology
← Previous; EMLL 53rd Anniversary Show	Next →: 31. Aniversario de Arena México

Juicio Final chronology
← Previous; 1985	Next → 1987

Juicio Final (1986) (Spanish for "Final Judgement" 1986) was a professional wrestling supercard show, scripted and produced by Consejo Mundial de Lucha Libre (CMLL), which took place on December 4, 1986, in Arena México, Mexico City, Mexico. The show served as the year-end finale for CMLL before Arena México, CMLL's main venue, closed down for the winter for renovations and to host Circo Atayde . The shows replaced the regular Super Viernes ("Super Friday") shows held by CMLL since the mid-1930s.

The 1986 Jucio Final featured two Lucha de Apuestas, or bet matches, which are promoted as much more important than championship matches in Mexico. In the main event Atlantis defeated Hombre Bala, after which Hombre Bala removed his mask and revealed his real name; Ignacio Gómez Ruiz. With the unmasking it was confirmed that Hombre Bala had previously worked under the ring name Chamacho Ortiz. In the semi-main event El Satánico defeated Pirata Morgan, in an Apuestas match where both unmasked wrestlers risked their hair instead. As a result Pirata Morgan had all his hair shaved off.

== Production ==
=== Background ===
For decades Arena México, the main venue of the Mexican professional wrestling promotion Consejo Mundial de Lucha Libre (CMLL), would close down in early December and remain closed into either January or February to allow for renovations as well as letting Circo Atayde occupy the space over the holidays. As a result CMLL usually held a "end of the year" supercard show on the first or second Friday of December in lieu of their normal Super Viernes show. 1955 was the first year where CMLL used the name "El Juicio Final" ("The Final Judgement") for their year-end supershow. It is no longer an annually recurring show, but instead held intermittently sometimes several years apart and not always in the same month of the year either. All Juicio Final shows have been held in Arena México in Mexico City, Mexico which is CMLL's main venue, its "home".

=== Storylines ===
The 1987 Juicio Final show featured five professional wrestling matches scripted by CMLL with some wrestlers involved in scripted feuds. The wrestlers portray either heels (referred to as rudos in Mexico, those that play the part of the "bad guys") or faces (técnicos in Mexico, the "good guy" characters) as they perform.

== Results ==
No.	Results	Stipulations
1^{D}	Mogur, Rokambole, and Solar II vs. Comando Negro, El Enfermero Jr., and Guerrero Negro ended in an unknown manner	Best two-out-of-three falls six-man tag team match
2^{D}	Américo Rocca, Kung Fu, and Tony Benetto vs Babe Face, El Dandy, and Talisman ended in an unknown manner	Best two-out-of-three falls six-man tag team match
3^{D}	Rayo de Jalisco Jr., Tony Salazar, and Villano III vs Los Hermanos Dinamita (Cien Caras and Máscara Año 2000) and Sangre Chicana ended in an unknown manner	Best two-out-of-three falls six-man tag team match
4	El Satánico defeated Pirata Morgan	Best two-out-of-three falls Lucha de Apuestas, hair vs. hair match
5	Atlantis defeated Hombre Bala	Best two-out-of-three falls Lucha de Apuestas, mask vs. mask match
D / – this was a dark match
