= Juicio Final (1982) =

Mexican professional wrestling event

- Promotion: Empresa Mexicana de Lucha Libre
- Date: December 10, 1982
- City: Mexico City, Mexico
- Venue: Arena México

Event chronology
← Previous; EMLL 49th Anniversary Show	Next →: 27. Aniversario de Arena México

Juicio Final chronology
← Previous; 1981	Next → 1983

Juicio Final (1982) (Spanish for "Final Judgement" 1982) was a professional wrestling supercard show, scripted and produced by Consejo Mundial de Lucha Libre (CMLL), which took place on December 10, 1982, in Arena México, Mexico City, Mexico. The show served as the year-end finale for CMLL before Arena México, CMLL's main venue, closed down for the winter for renovations and to host Circo Atayde. The shows replaced the regular Super Viernes ("Super Friday") shows held by CMLL since the mid-1930s.

The main event match ended in a draw between Sangre Chicana and El Satánico, which meant that both men were shaved bald afterwards due to the Lucha de Apuestas ("bet match") stipulation. In the semi-main event, EMLL held a rare three-versus-three Lucha de Apuestas match that saw César Curiel, Rey Salomón, and Ringo Mendoza defeat the trio of Adorable Rubi, Herodes, and Tony Benetto, forcing Rubi, Heroeds and Benetto to have their heads shaved. In the third match of the night the team of Alfonso Dantes and Aníbal lost to Lizmark and Rayo de Jalisco Jr. as Aníbal removed Lizmark's mask to cause a disqualification. The show featured three additional matches.

== Production ==
=== Background ===
For decades Arena México, the main venue of the Mexican professional wrestling promotion Consejo Mundial de Lucha Libre (CMLL), would close down in early December and remain closed into either January or February to allow for renovations as well as letting Circo Atayde occupy the space over the holidays. As a result, CMLL usually held a "end of the year" supercard show on the first or second Friday of December in lieu of their normal Super Viernes show. 1955 was the first year where CMLL used the name "El Juicio Final" ("The Final Judgement") for their year-end supershow. It is no longer an annually recurring show, but instead held intermittently sometimes several years apart and not always in the same month of the year either. All Juicio Final shows have been held in Arena México in Mexico City, Mexico which is CMLL's main venue, its "home".

=== Storylines ===
The 1982 Juicio Final show featured six professional wrestling matches scripted by CMLL with some wrestlers involved in scripted feuds. The wrestlers portray either heels (referred to as rudos in Mexico, those that play the part of the "bad guys") or faces (técnicos in Mexico, the "good guy" characters) as they perform.

== Results ==
No.	Results	Stipulations
1	Scaramouche vs El Dorado ended in an unknown manner	Singles match
2	Águila India and Gran Cochisse defeated Belcebú and El Supremo	Tag team match
3	Lizmark and Rayo de Jalisco Jr. defeated Alfonso Dantés and Aníbal by disqualification	Tag team match
4	Espectro Jr., La Fiera, and Mocho Cota vs. Los Misioneros de la Muerte (El Signo, Negro Navarro, and El Texano) ended in a draw	Six-man tag team match
5	César Curiel, Rey Salomon, and Ringo Mendoza defeated Adorable Rubí, Herodes, and Tony Benetto	Best two-out-of-three falls Lucha de Apuestas, hair vs. hair match
6	El Satánico defeated Sangre Chicana	Best two-out-of-three falls Lucha de Apuestas, hair vs. hair match
