= EMLL 52nd Anniversary Show =

1985 EMLL eventMexican Professional wrestling show

- Promotion: Empresa Mexicana de Lucha Libre
- Date: September 20, 1985
- City: Mexico City, Mexico
- Venue: Arena México
- Attendance: 0

Event chronology
← Previous; 29. Aniversario de Arena México	Next → Juicio Final

EMLL Anniversary Shows chronology
← Previous; 51st Anniversary	Next → 53rd Anniversary

The EMLL 52nd Anniversary Show (Spanish: 52. Aniversario de EMLL) was supposed to be a professional wrestling major show event produced by Empresa Mexicana de Lucha Libre (EMLL, later renamed Consejo Mundial de Lucha Libre, CMLL) slated to take place on September 20, 1985, in Arena México in Mexico City, Mexico. But was canceled due to the Mexico City earthquake the day before. The event was supposed to commemorate the 52nd anniversary of EMLL, the oldest still active professional wrestling promotion in the world. The Anniversary show is EMLL's biggest show of the year, their Super Bowl event. The EMLL Anniversary Show series is the longest-running annual professional wrestling show, starting in 1934.

In the main event of the show both El Supremo and El Dorado were supposed to risk their masks in a Lucha de Apuestas match. Furthermore, Cachorro Mendoza was slated to defend the NWA World Middleweight Championship against El Solar and 3 Six-man "Lucha Libre rules" tag team matches were also announced.

== Production ==
=== Background ===
The 1985 Anniversary show was supposed to commemorate the 52nd anniversary of the Mexican professional wrestling company Empresa Mexicana de Lucha Libre (Spanish for "Mexican Wrestling Promotion"; EMLL) holding their first show on September 22, 1933, by promoter and founder Salvador Lutteroth. EMLL was rebranded early in 1992 to become Consejo Mundial de Lucha Libre ("World Wrestling Council"; CMLL) signal their departure from the National Wrestling Alliance. With the sales of the Jim Crockett Promotions to Ted Turner in 1988 EMLL became the oldest, still-operating wrestling promotion in the world. Over the years EMLL/CMLL has on occasion held multiple shows to celebrate their anniversary but since 1977 the company has only held one annual show, which is considered the biggest show of the year, CMLL's equivalent of WWE's WrestleMania or their Super Bowl event. CMLL has held their Anniversary show at Arena México in Mexico City, Mexico since 1956, the year the building was completed, over time Arena México earned the nickname "The Cathedral of Lucha Libre" due to it hosting most of EMLL/CMLL's major events since the building was completed. Traditionally EMLL/CMLL holds their major events on Friday Nights, replacing their regularly scheduled Super Viernes show.

=== Storylines ===
The event was supposed to feature five professional wrestling matches with different wrestlers involved in pre-existing scripted feuds, plots and storylines. Wrestlers were portrayed as either heels (referred to as rudos in Mexico, those that portray the "bad guys") or faces (técnicos in Mexico, the "good guy" characters) as they followed a series of tension-building events, which culminated in a wrestling match or series of matches.

== Event ==
The 52nd Anniversary Show was scheduled to take place on September 20, 1985, but the day before the event Mexico City was it with a magnitude 8.0 earthquake. EMLL canceled the event both because of the general devastation but also over fears that Arena México might not be structurally sound after the earthquake. This was the first time an Anniversary Show had been canceled and only the third time in the history of EMLL/CMLL that they would cancel a Friday show in Arena México, the other two being due to mass gatherings being discouraged during the swine influenza epidemic of 2009 and in 2012 when a demonstration in the area of Arena México made CMLL cancel a CMLL Super Viernes event due to fearing for the safety of their fans.

The main event of the show was scheduled to be a Lucha de Apuestas “mask vs. mask” match where both Supreme and El Dorado would put their masks on the line. The match never took place, not even at a later date so it is unclear who was supposed to win the match. El Dorado lost his mask in 1986, but not to El Supremo and El Supremo would not lose his mask until 1992.

== Scheduled event ==
No.	Matches*	Stipulations
1	Américo Rocca, Stuka and Gran Cochisse vs. Jerry Estrada, Mocho Cota and El Enfermero	Six-man "Lucha Libre rules" tag team match
2	Los Infernales (El Satánico, MS-1 and Pirata Morgan) (c) vs. Los Brazos (Brazo de Oro, Brazo de Plata and El Brazo)	Six-man "Lucha Libre rules" tag team match for the Mexican National Trios Championship
3	Apolo Dantés, Súper Halcón and Tony Salazar vs. Sangre Chicana, Cien Caras and El Faraón	Six-man "Lucha Libre rules" tag team match
4	Cachorro Mendoza (c) vs. El Solar	Best two-out-of three falls match for the NWA World Middleweight Championship
5	El Supremo vs. El Dorado	Best two-out-of-three falls Lucha de Apuestas Mask vs. Mask match
(c) / – the champion(s) heading into the match; *Card subject to change
