= Juicio Final (1985) =

Mexican professional wrestling event

- Promotion: Empresa Mexicana de Lucha Libre
- Date: December 6, 1985
- City: Mexico City, Mexico
- Venue: Arena México

Event chronology
← Previous; EMLL 52nd Anniversary Show	Next →: 30. Aniversario de Arena México

Juicio Final chronology
← Previous; 1984	Next → 1986

Juicio Final (1985) (Spanish for "Final Judgement" 1985) was a professional wrestling supercard show, scripted and produced by Consejo Mundial de Lucha Libre (CMLL), which took place on December 6, 1985, in Arena México, Mexico City, Mexico. The show served as the year-end finale for CMLL before Arena México, CMLL's main venue, closed down for the winter for renovations and to host Circo Atayde. The shows replaced the regular Super Viernes ("Super Friday") shows held by CMLL since the mid-1930s.

In the main event of the show El Solar II defeated Belcebú in a Lucha de Apuestas, or "bet match", forcing Belcebú to remove his devil inspired mask and reveal that his name was Juan Manuel Linares. In the semi-main event of the six-match show, El Dandy defeated Gran Cochisse, which meant that Cochisse had all his hair shaved off afterwards. The four remaining matches included a tag team match and three Best two-out-of-three falls six-man tag team matches.

In addition to being EMLL's year end show, thee show was also a benefit show for victims of the 1985 Mexico City earthquake that happened on September 19, 1985, that had caused the death of over 5,000 people and cased major damage to Mexico City, including structural damage to Arena México. The earthquake had also forced the cancellation of the EMLL 52nd Anniversary Show.

== Production ==
=== Background ===
For decades Arena México, the main venue of the Mexican professional wrestling promotion Consejo Mundial de Lucha Libre (CMLL), would close down in early December and remain closed into either January or February to allow for renovations as well as letting Circo Atayde occupy the space over the holidays. As a result, CMLL usually held a "end of the year" supercard show on the first or second Friday of December in lieu of their normal Super Viernes show. 1955 was the first year where CMLL used the name "El Juicio Final" ("The Final Judgement") for their year-end supershow. It is no longer an annually recurring show, but instead held intermittently sometimes several years apart and not always in the same month of the year either. All Juicio Final shows have been held in Arena México in Mexico City, Mexico which is CMLL's main venue, its "home".

=== Storylines ===
The 1985 Juicio Final show featured six professional wrestling matches scripted by CMLL with some wrestlers involved in scripted feuds. The wrestlers portray either heels (referred to as rudos in Mexico, those that play the part of the "bad guys") or faces (técnicos in Mexico, the "good guy" characters) as they perform.

== Results ==
No.	Results	Stipulations
1	Águila Solitaria and Javier Llanes defeated Cimarron Negro and Guerrero Negro	Tag team match
2	Los Destructores (Leon Chino, Tony Arce, and Vulcano) defeated Los Bravos (Bufalo Salvaje, Fuerza Guerrera, and Talisman)	Best two-out-of-three falls six-man tag team match
3	Los Hermanos Dinamitas (Cien Caras and Máscara Año 2000), and Sangre Chicana defeated Los Brazos (Brazo de Oro, Brazo de Plata, and El Brazo)	Best two-out-of-three falls six-man tag team match
4	Los Infernales (El Satánico, MS-1, and Pirata Morgan) defeated El Egipcio, El Faraón, and La Fiera	Best two-out-of-three falls six-man tag team match
5	El Dandy defeated Gran Cochisse	Best two-out-of-three falls Lucha de Apuestas, hair vs. hair match
6	El Solar II defeated Belcebu	Best two-out-of-three falls Lucha de Apuestas, mask vs. mask match
