= Juicio Final (1992) =

- Promotion: Consejo Mundial de Lucha Libre
- Date: December 18, 1992
- City: Mexico City, Mexico
- Venue: Arena México

Event chronology
← Previous; CMLL 59th Anniversary Show	Next → CMLL 60th Anniversary Show

Juicio Final chronology
← Previous; 1991	Next → 1993

Juicio Final (1992) (Spanish for "Final Judgement " 1992) was a professional wrestling supercard show, scripted and produced by Consejo Mundial de Lucha Libre (CMLL), which took place on December 18, 1992, in Arena México, Mexico City, Mexico. The show served as the year-end finale for CMLL before Arena México, CMLL's main venue, closed down for the winter for renovations and to host Circo Atayde . The shows replaced the regular Super Viernes ("Super Friday") shows held by CMLL since the mid-1930s. This was the fifth third that CMLL used the name "Jucio Final" for their year-end show, a name they would use on a regular basis going forward, originally for their year even events but later on held at other points in the year.

The main event of the show was a Luchas de Apuestas, or bet match, which is considered a higher profile match type than a championship match in Lucha Libre. For the 1992 Juicio Final main event both Pierroth Jr. and El Supremo "bet" their mask on the outcome of the match. Pierroth Jr. defeated El Supremo two falls to one, forcing El Supremo to remove his mask and reveal his real name, Salvador Cuevas Ramírez, as per the Lucha de Apuestas stipulation. In the third match of the night, Javier Cruz and Kato Kung Lee both put their hair on the line for the match. Cruz won and Kato Kung Lee was forced to have all his hair shaved off. The show included three additional matches for a total of five matches in total.

== Production ==
=== Background ===
For decades Arena México, the main venue of the Mexican professional wrestling promotion Consejo Mundial de Lucha Libre (CMLL), would close down in early December and remain closed into either January or February to allow for renovations as well as letting Circo Atayde occupy the space over the holidays. As a result, CMLL usually held a "end of the year" supercard show on the first or second Friday of December in lieu of their normal Super Viernes show. 1955 was the first year where CMLL used the name "El Juicio Final" ("The Final Judgement") for their year-end supershow. Until 2000 the Jucio Final name was always used for the year end show, but since 2000 has at times been used for shows outside of December. It is no longer an annually recurring show, but instead held intermittently sometimes several years apart and not always in the same month of the year either. All Juicio Final shows have been held in Arena México in Mexico City, Mexico which is CMLL's main venue, its "home".

=== Storylines ===
The 1992 Juicio Final show featured five professional wrestling matches scripted by CMLL with some wrestlers involved in scripted feuds. The wrestlers portray either heels (referred to as rudos in Mexico, those that play the part of the "bad guys") or faces (técnicos in Mexico, the "good guy" characters) as they perform.

== Results ==
No.	Results	Stipulations
1	Cicloncito Ramirez, Mascarita Magica and Último Dragoncito defeated El Felinito, Piratita Morgan and Ultratumbita	Best two-out-of-three falls six-man tag team match
2	Los Metalicos (Bronce, Oro and Plata) defeated Los Cavernicolas (Cromagnon, Popitekus and Troglodita)	Best two-out-of-three falls six-man tag team match
3	Javier Cruz defeated Kato Kung Lee	Best two-out-of-three falls Lucha de Apuestas hair vs. hair match
4	El Dandy, Rayo de Jalisco Jr. King Haku defeated Sangre Chicana and The Headhunters (Headhunter A and B)	Best two-out-of-three falls six-man tag team match
5	Pierroth Jr. defeated El Supremo	Best two-out-of-three falls Lucha de Apuestas mask vs. mask match
