= Juicio Final (1980) =

Mexican professional wrestling event

- Promotion: Empresa Mexicana de Lucha Libre
- Date: December 5, 1980
- City: Mexico City, Mexico
- Venue: Arena México

Event chronology
← Previous; EMLL 47th Anniversary Show	Next →: 25. Aniversario de Arena México

Juicio Final chronology
← Previous; 1979	Next → 1981

Juicio Final (1980) (Spanish for "Final Judgement" 1980) was a professional wrestling supercard show, scripted and produced by Consejo Mundial de Lucha Libre (CMLL), which took place on December 5, 1980, in Arena México, Mexico City, Mexico. The show served as the year-end finale for CMLL before Arena México, CMLL's main venue, closed down for the winter for renovations and to host Circo Atayde. The shows replaced the regular Super Viernes ("Super Friday") shows held by CMLL since the mid-1930s.

Results records have only documented one match on the 1980 Juicio Final show. The main event, which saw the duo of Sangre Chicana and Alfonso Dantés defeat El Jalisco and El Cobarde in a Lucha de Apuestas, or "bet match", which resulted in both El Jalisco and El Cobarde being shaved bald afterwards in the lucha libre tradition.

== Production ==
=== Background ===
For decades Arena México, the main venue of the Mexican professional wrestling promotion Consejo Mundial de Lucha Libre (CMLL), would close down in early December and remain closed into either January or February to allow for renovations as well as letting Circo Atayde occupy the space over the holidays. As a result, CMLL usually held a "end of the year" supercard show on the first or second Friday of December in lieu of their normal Super Viernes show. 1955 was the first year where CMLL used the name "El Juicio Final" ("The Final Judgement") for their year-end supershow. It is no longer an annually recurring show, but instead held intermittently sometimes several years apart and not always in the same month of the year either. All Juicio Final shows have been held in Arena México in Mexico City, Mexico which is CMLL's main venue, its "home".

=== Storylines ===
The 1980 Juicio Final show featured an undetermined number of professional wrestling matches scripted by CMLL with some wrestlers involved in scripted feuds. The wrestlers portray either heels (referred to as rudos in Mexico, those that play the part of the "bad guys") or faces (técnicos in Mexico, the "good guy" characters) as they perform.

== Results ==
No.	Results	Stipulations
1	Sangre Chicana and Alfonso Dantés defeated El Jalisco and El Cobarde	Best two-out-of-three falls Lucha de Apuestas, hair vs hair match
