= EMLL 47th Anniversary Show =

Mexican Professional wrestling show

- Promotion: Empresa Mexicana de Lucha Libre
- Date: September 26, 1980
- City: Mexico City, Mexico
- Venue: Arena México
- Attendance: 17,000

Event chronology
← Previous; 24. Aniversario de Arena México	Next → Juicio Final

EMLL Anniversary Show chronology
← Previous; 46th Anniversary	Next → 48th Anniversary

The EMLL 47th Anniversary Show (Spanish: 47. Aniversario de EMLL) was a professional wrestling major show event produced by Empresa Mexicana de Lucha Libre (EMLL) that took place on September 26, 1980, in Arena México, Mexico City, Mexico. The event commemorated the 47th anniversary of EMLL, which would become the oldest professional wrestling promotion in the world. The Anniversary show is EMLL's biggest show of the year, their Super Bowl event. The EMLL Anniversary Show series is the longest-running annual professional wrestling show, starting in 1934.

== Production ==
=== Background ===
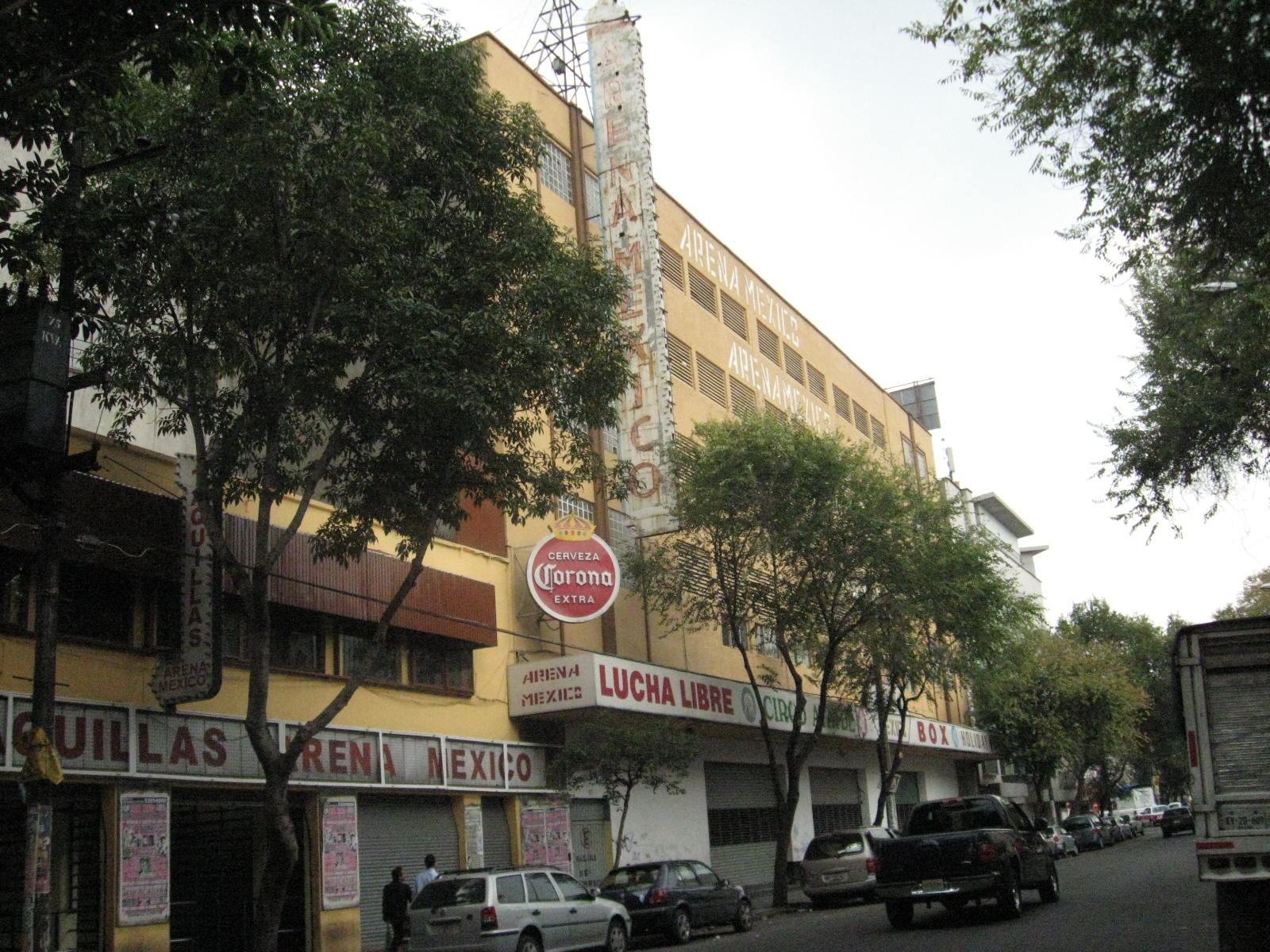
Arena México, CMLL's main venue and location of the Anniversary Show

The Mexican Lucha libre (professional wrestling) company Consejo Mundial de Lucha Libre (CMLL) started out under the name Empresa Mexicana de Lucha Libre ("Mexican Wrestling Company"; EMLL), founded by Salvador Lutteroth in 1933. Lutteroth, inspired by professional wrestling shows he had attended in Texas, decided to become a wrestling promoter and held his first show on September 21, 1933, marking what would be the beginning of organized professional wrestling in Mexico. Lutteroth would later become known as "the father of Lucha Libre" . A year later EMLL held the EMLL 1st Anniversary Show, starting the annual tradition of the Consejo Mundial de Lucha Libre Anniversary Shows that have been held each year ever since, most commonly in September.

Over the years the anniversary show would become the biggest show of the year for CMLL, akin to the Super Bowl for the National Football League (NFL) or WWE's WrestleMania event. The first anniversary show was held in Arena Modelo, which Lutteroth had bought after starting EMLL. In 1942–43 Lutteroth financed the construction of Arena Coliseo, which opened in April 1943. The EMLL 10th Anniversary Show was the first of the anniversary shows to be held in Arena Coliseo. In 1956 Lutteroth had Arena México built in the location of the original Arena Modelo, making Arena México the main venue of EMLL from that point on. Starting with the EMLL 23rd Anniversary Show, all anniversary shows except for the EMLL 46th Anniversary Show have been held in the arena that would become known as "The Cathedral of Lucha Libre". On occasion EMLL held more than one show labelled as their "Anniversary" show, such as two 33rd Anniversary Shows in 1966. Over time the anniversary show series became the oldest, longest-running annual professional wrestling show. In comparison, WWE's WrestleMania is only the fourth oldest still promoted show (CMLL's Arena Coliseo Anniversary Show and Arena México anniversary shows being second and third). Traditionally CMLL holds their major events on Friday Nights, replacing their regularly scheduled Super Viernes show.

=== Storylines ===
The event featured six professional wrestling matches with different wrestlers involved in pre-existing scripted feuds, plots and storylines. Wrestlers were portrayed as either heels (referred to as rudos in Mexico, those that portray the "bad guys") or faces (técnicos in Mexico, the "good guy" characters) as they followed a series of tension-building events, which culminated in a wrestling match or series of matches. The 47th Anniversary event is the oldest EMLL Anniversary event where all the matches have been documented.

== Event ==
The show began with a regular singles match between El Vengador ("The Avenger") and Manuel Robles that was won by the masked Vengador. The second match of the night was a two out of three falls Six-man tag team match, a match format that would soon become the most used match format in EMLL. The match saw the rudo (wrestlers who portray the bad guys) team of Siglo XX, Mascara Año 2000 and El Cobarde defeat the team of Herodes, El Nazi and Bruno Victoria, two falls to one. In the third under-card match Seiji Sakaguchi and a partner whose identity has not been documented defeated the team of Tony Benetto and Alfonso Dantes in a regular tag team match. In the first featured match of the show Mexican National Heavyweight Champion, Cien Caras faced one of the early challenges in his long and successful career as he defeated TNT in a best two-out-of three falls match. The semi-final match saw Sangre Chicana successfully defend the NWA World Middleweight Championship against El Fantasma, in a drawn out, three falls match. The final match of the night featured Mocho Cota and El Satánico facing off in a Lucha de Apuestas hair vs. hair match. The Apuestas match is considered the most prestigious match in Lucha Libre, which is why it received top billing over two championship matches. The show saw Satánico pin his opponent twice, forcing Mocho Cota to be shaved bald after the match per the Lucha de Apuestas stipulation.

== Results ==
No.	Results	Stipulations
1	El Vengador defeated Manuel Robles	Singles match
2	Siglo XX, Máscara Año 2000 and El Cobarde defeated Herodes, El Nazi and Bruno Victoria	Best two-out-of-three falls six-man tag team match
3	Seiji Sakaguchi and El Faraón defeated Tony Benetto and Alfonso Dantes	Best two-out-of-three falls Tag team match
4	Cien Caras (c) defeated TNT	Best two-out-of-three falls for the Mexican National Heavyweight Championship
5	Sangre Chicana (c) vs El Fantasma ended in a no contest	Best two-out-of-three falls for the NWA World Middleweight Championship
6	El Satánico defeated Mocho Cota	Best two-out-of-three falls Lucha de Apuestas hair vs. hair match
(c) / – the champion(s) heading into the match
