= César Curiel =

Mexican professional wrestler

Personal information
- Born: César Curiel; October 12, 1949 (age 76)

Professional wrestling career
- Ring name(s): César Curiel; Quazar
- Billed height: 1.74 m (5 ft 8 1/2 in)
- Billed weight: 93 kg (205 lb)
- Trained by: Diablo Velazco

César Curiel (born October 12, 1949) is a retired Mexican professional wrestler who was active in the 1970s, 1980s and 1990s. Curiel has three sons who are currently wrestling, Neutron, Steel Man and Cat Man.

Early in Curiel's career, on December 25, 1979, he was involved in the death of wrestler José Vincent Ramos Estrada, known to the professional wrestling world under the ring name Sangre India. Curiel was teaming with El Vengador while Sangre India was teaming with Leo Lopez. During the match Curiel executed a drop kick, a move that supposed to knocked Sangre India out of the ring to the floor. During the fall to the floor Estrada's head and neck struck the apron before he tumbled uncontrollably to the ground. Estrada died shortly after the fall. Subsequently, wrestling magazines ran a storyline that claimed that "it was dangerous to wrestle César Curiel", even though he was not at fault. In subsequent years magazines stopped claiming that Curiel was in any way responsible for the death. It took a couple of years after the death for Curiel to truly shake the image of being "the most dangerous luchador". On April 2, 1982, Curiel defeated El Faraón to win the NWA World Middleweight Championship. Curiel's reign with the title lasted until October 25, 1982, when he lost the title to El Satánico. In the mid-1980s Curiel began wrestling as the enmascarado (masked) character Quazar until June 24, 1988, when he lost a Lucha de Apuesta (bet match) to Mogur and had to unmask.

== Championships and accomplishments ==
- Empresa Mexicana de Lucha Libre
  - NWA World Middleweight Championship (1 time)

== Luchas de Apuestas record ==
| Winner (wager) | Loser (wager) | Location | Event | Date | Notes |
|---|---|---|---|---|---|
| Vick Amezcua (hair) | César Curiel (hair) | Mexico City | Live event | N/A | |
| Calavera I (hair) | César Curiel (hair) | Guadalajara, Jalisco | Live event | N/A | |
| César Curiel (hair) | Pirata Morgan (hair) | Mexico City | {Live event | August 31, 1980 | |
| El Fantasma (mask) and César Curiel (hair) | Rey Salomón (mask) and Índio Jerónimo (hair) | N/A | Live event | March 12, 1982 | |
| Ringo Mendoza, César Curiel and Rey Salomón (hair) | Tony Benetto, Herodes and Adorable Rubí (hair) | Mexico City | Live event | December 10, 1982 | |
| Pirata Morgan (hair) | César Curiel (hair) | Mexico City | Live event | April 24, 1983 | |
| Enfermero, Jr. (hair) | César Curiel (hair) | Mexico City | Live event | December 9, 1983 | |
| Mogur (mask) | Quazar (mask) | Mexico City | Live event | June 24, 1988 | |
| Remo Banda (hair) | César Curiel (hair) | Mexico City | Live event | April 1, 1990 | |
