= El Halcón =

Mexican retired (born 1947)

Personal information
- Born: José Luis Melchor Ortiz; July 23, 1947 (age 79) Federal District, Mexico

Professional wrestling career
- Ring name(s): El Halcón; Argos; Bengala; Danny Ortiz; Halcón Dorado; Halcón Ortiz; Horus El Super Halcon; Super Halcón
- Billed height: 5 ft 10 in (1.78 m)
- Billed weight: 231 lb (105 kg)
- Debut: 1968

José Luis Melchor Ortiz (born July 23, 1947 in Mexico City, Mexico) is a Mexican retired professional wrestler, best known by his ring name El Halcón. During his career, which spanned over five decades, he competed throughout the United States and Mexico. In America, he is perhaps best known for his tenure with Fritz Von Erich's Big Time Wrestling (World Class Championship Wrestling), where he is a former four-time NWA Americas Tag Team Champion and two-time NWA American Heavyweight Champion.

In Mexico, Melchor is perhaps best known for his tenure with Consejo Mundial de Lucha Libre (CMLL), where he is a former five-time Mexican National Heavyweight Champion. A popular competitor throughout the 1970s and 80s as both a técnico and rudo, his real name was not a matter of public record (as is often the case with masked wrestlers in Mexico) until the 29th of July 1977, when he lost his mask in a match against Mil Mascaras at Arena Mexico.

Melchor is also known as Super Halcón and (after unmasking) Danny Ortiz and Halcón Ortiz. His son, Super Halcón Jr. is also a professional wrestler who currently competes in CMLL.

== Professional wrestling career ==
Throughout his career, El Halcón wrestled throughout Mexico and the United States, primarily in Los Angeles and Houston for Fritz Von Erich's Big Time Wrestling (later renamed World Class Championship Wrestling). He debuted in 1968 as Danny Ortiz and soon become a mainstay for Consejo Mundial de Lucha Libre (CMLL). In 1973, he won a contest held by El Halcon Magazine to become their official sponsored representative luchador and adopt the namesake gimmick of "El Halcón". By the late 1970s, he was also wrestling for various promotions throughout the United States, including NWA Hollywood, Southwest Championship Wrestling, Big Time Wrestling where he competed against the likes of Roddy Piper and teamed regularly with Chavo Guerrero in a rivalry with Ron Bass and Ron Starr. He and Chavo won the NWA Americas Tag Team Championship on February 24, 1978. He also had a stint with All Japan Pro Wrestling, where he took his rivalry with Mil Máscaras, competing against him at AJPW Summer Action Series II 1978.

On July 29, 1977, he lost his mask in a bout against Mil Mascaras at Arena Mexico, after which he revealed his real name and reverted to "Danny" Ortiz within the promotion. Due to issues regarding the original magazine's rights to the name, other luchadors cropped up with variations on it, such as "Halcón 78" and "Falcón". As a técnico (fan favourite) he competed unmasked under the ring name "Halcon Ortiz". He had a memorable feud with Herodes, winning the Mexican National Heavyweight Championship form him in a hair vs. hair match. Halcón went on to lose a hair vs. hair match against Cien Caras, which lead him to putting his mask back on and computing under a new ring name - Super Halcón. Later, he held both the National Championship and WWA World Heavyweight Championship together, he also competed in AAA. On April 23, 1989, he lost his mask again in a mask vs. mask match against Rayo de Jalisco Jr. A legend within CMLL, he has appeared sporadically on CMLL television with his son Super Halcón Jr. who captured La Copa Junior in 2014.

== Championships and accomplishments ==
- Consejo Mundial de Lucha Libre
  - Mexican National Heavyweight Championship (5 times)
  - EMLL Arena México Tag Team Championship (with El Solitario)
  - Copa Bobby Bonales (2025)
- NWA Big Time Wrestling/WCCW
  - NWA Americas Tag Team Championship (4 times)
  - NWA American Heavyweight Championship (2 times)
- World Wrestling Association
  - WWA World Heavyweight Championship (1 time)

== Luchas de Apuestas record ==
Winner (wager)	Loser (wager)	Location	Event	Date	Notes
Dr Wagner and Halcón	Gemelo Diablo 1 & 2 (Masks)	Mexico City	Live Event	May 1, 1975	
Mil Máscaras (mask)	El Halcón (mask)	Mexico City	Live Event	July 29, 1977	
Cien Caras (mask)	Halcón Ortiz (hair)	Mexico City	Live Event	May 15, 1984	
Rayo de Jalisco Jr. (mask)	Super Halcón (mask)	Mexico City	Live Event	April 23, 1989	
