= El Supremo (wrestler) =

Mexican professional wrestler (1942–2010)

- This image is not of El Supremo but someone wearing the El Supremo mask

Personal information
- Born: Salvador Cuevas Ramírez; July 8, 1942 Tijuana, Baja California, Mexico
- Died: May 3, 2010 (aged 67) Tijuana, Baja California, Mexico

Professional wrestling career
- Ring name(s): Power Man; El Magnifico; El Supremo; El Supremo I
- Billed height: 1.73 m (5 ft 8 in)
- Billed weight: 84 kg (185 lb)
- Trained by: Diablo Velazco; Felipe Ham Lee
- Debut: July 8, 1976
- Retired: 1995

Salvador Cuevas Ramírez (July 8, 1942 – May 3, 2010) was a Mexican professional wrestler, known under the ring name El Supremo. Cuevas was originally an masked wrestler but lost his mask in 1992 to Pierroth, Jr.

== Biography ==
Salvador Cuevas was born and raised in Tijuana, Baja California, Mexico, in 1942. As a teenager he began working out in various gyms, developing his body for bodybuilding competitions. He would later travel to Guadalajara, Jalisco, and then to Mexico City during his body building career. At some point in the 1960s or 1970s he won both the "Mr. Western Mexico" and the "Mr. Mexico" bodybuilding competitions.

=== Professional wrestling career ===
While in Guadalajara he began training for a professional wrestling career under legendary Mexican professional wrestling trainer Diablo Velazco. Later when he travelled to Mexico City he received additional training by Felipe Ham Lee. Cuevas made his debut in 1976 on his 34th birthday, using the ring name "Power Man". He was later forced to change his name as the promoters in the area had a rule about not using English names at that point in time. He changed his name and began wrestling under the name "El Magnifico" (Spanish for "The Magnificent One") wearing a gold mask and golden outfit. A week after he made his debut as El Magnifico a Chihuahua, Mexico based wrestler complained to the boxing and wrestling commission that he owned the rights to the name and Cuevas was forced to change his wrestling name. Cuevas almost did not get permission to use his chosen name "El Supremo" ("The Supreme One") for religious reasons, that it may be offensive to Catholics, but in the end he was allowed to use the name. Early on in his career El Supremo formed a successful tag team with Espectro, Jr. In late 1979 El Supremo teamed up with El Vikingo to face off against El Santo and Robot R-2 (A wrestler inspired by R2-D2 from the 1977 Star Wars movie) under Lucha de Apuesta, mask vs. mask rules where the wrestler who was pinned had to unmask. In the end El Supremo pinned Robot R-2 to claim his first Apuesta victory. On February 29, 1980, he continued his in-ring success as he unmasked a wrestler called Lawrence de Arabia following a Lucha de Apuesta match. On May 4, 1980, El Supremo defeated Kato Kung Lee to win the NWA World Welterweight Championship, one of the most prestigious titles in Mexico at the time. El Supremo only held the title for a month before losing it to Lizmark on June 6, 1980. The following year El Supremo defeated Franco Columbo to win the Mexican National Welterweight Championship on February 1, 1981. El Supremo held the Mexican Welterweight title for 422 days, making several high-profile title defenses in some of Empresa Mexicana de Lucha Libre's (EMLL) major venues. On March 30, 1982 El Talismán defeated El Supremo to win the Welterweight title.

El Supremo was booked for the main event of the EMLL 52nd Anniversary Show, where he was going to win a Luchas de Apuesta, mask vs. mask match against El Dorado but the match was cancelled as Mexico City was hit by a major earthquake the day before the show and it was cancelled. The scheduled match never took place and El Dorado later lost his mask to El Fantasma instead. In the early 1990s EMLL, now renamed Consejo Mundial de Lucha Libre (CMLL), introduced a wrestler called "El Supremo II" to team up with El Supremo, Supremo II was introduced so that the original Supremo could work a lighter schedule due to injuries and age. On December 8, 1992, El Supremo was unmasked as he lost a Luchas de Apuestas match against Pierroth, Jr. and was forced to unmask and reveal his real name after the match per lucha libre (the professional wrestling style originary from Mexico) tradition. At the time of his unmasking he announced that he was born in 1950, not 1942 to make himself appear younger than he actually was. Supremo and Supremo II teamed together until 1995 where El Supremo retired from wrestling and Supremo II changed his ring character to "Linx". After his retirement he moved back to Tijuana and worked for the local boxing and wrestling commission for a while. Cuevas's son currently wrestles as "El Supremo, Jr."

== Death ==
Salvador Cuevas Ramírez died on May 3, 2010, from a heart attack. Ramírez had been in fine health before his heart attack.

== Championships and accomplishments ==
- Empresa Mexicana de Lucha Libre
  - Mexican National Welterweight Championship (1 time)
  - NWA World Welterweight Championship (1 time)
- Comision de Box y Lucha D.F.
  - Districto Federal Welterweight Championship (1 time)

== Luchas de Apuestas record ==
Winner (wager)	Loser (wager)	Location	Event	Date	Notes
El Supremo (mask)	Robot R-2 (mask)	Mexico City	Live event	October 19, 1979	(Note: Supremo teamed with Vikingo against Robot R-2 and El Santo, person pinned was unmasked.)
El Supremo (mask)	Lawrence de Arabia (mask)	Mexico City	Live event	February 29, 1980	
El Supremo (mask)	Guerrero Azteca (mask)	Monterrey, Nuevo León	Live event	April 1987	
Pierroth Jr. (mask)	El Supremo (mask)	Mexico City	Juicio Final	December 8, 1992	
