= Alfonso Dantés =

Mexican professional wrestler (1943–2008)

- Dantés as NWA World Light Heavyweight Champion during the 1970s

Personal information
- Born: José Luis Amezcua Díaz; April 13, 1943 Guadalajara, Jalisco, Mexico
- Died: July 30, 2008 (aged 65) Manzanillo, Colima, Mexico

Professional wrestling career
- Ring name(s): Alfonso Dantés; Dantés; Edmundo Dantés; El Tanque (The Tank)
- Billed height: 5 ft 8 in (1.73 m)
- Billed weight: 210 lb (95 kg)
- Trained by: Diablo Velasco
- Debut: 1960
- Retired: 1989

José Luis Amezcua Díaz (April 13, 1943 – July 30, 2008) was a Mexican professional wrestler who wrestled during the 1960s and 1970s under the ring name Alfonso Dantés (the name was taken from the main character of the Count of Monte Cristo novel, Edmond Dantès). He would later receive the nickname El Tanque (which means "The Tank") for his short but thick build. Dantés was the son of Al Amezcua, who wrestled in Mexico as Golden Terror. He and his brother Vick would follow their father into the sport. Vick would go on to wrestle as Septiembre Negro.

== Professional wrestling career ==
Dantés was trained by Diablo Velasco and he made his debut in 1960 at the age of 17. Dantés won his first major title when he defeated Raúl Reyes for the Mexican National Light Heavyweight Championship on May 5, 1965. He would lose the title in February of the following year but eventually reclaimed the title twice before finally losing it on December 27, 1981. In the 1970s, Dantés won the NWA World Light Heavyweight title three times and defeated Chavo Guerrero Sr. on April 15, 1977, in Mexico City. In 1969, Dantés would team up with Mil Mascaras, Francisco Flores and El Medico to win three NWA America's Tag Team titles. He was involved in several hair vs mask matches and participated in a famous triangular tournament in which El Halcon lost his mask. Dantés would later capture the hair of El Halcon and El Faraón as well. He would also lose his hair to Sangre Chicana, Pharaoh and Ringo Mendoza. On March 30, 1984, Dantés captured the Mexican National Heavyweight Championship from Cien Caras, in Mexico City. He would lose the title but win it back one last time on August 8, 1988, when he defeated Gran Markus, Jr. Dantés vacated the title when he retired in March 1989 at the age of 45. In his last few years, Dantés would team up with his sons Apolo and Cesar. He was well respected within the industry for his work ethic and innovation in the ring. He is credited with inventing the Toque Tapatio, a move which Tiger Mask would make popular outside Mexico as the Tiger Suplex. In 1996, he was inducted into the Wrestling Observer Hall of Fame.

== Championships and accomplishments ==
- Comisión de Box y Lucha Libre Guadalajara
  - Occidente Middleweight Championship (1 time)
  - Occidente Tag Team Championship (1 time) - with Pantera Blanca
- Empresa Mexicana de Lucha Libre
  - NWA World Light Heavyweight Championship (5 times)
  - Mexican National Heavyweight Championship (2 times)
  - Mexican National Light Heavyweight Championship (3 times)
- NWA Hollywood Wrestling
  - NWA Americas Tag Team Championship (3 times) – with Mil Máscaras (2) and Francisco Flores (1)
- Wrestling Observer Newsletter
  - Wrestling Observer Newsletter Hall of Fame (Class of 1996)

== Luchas de Apuestas record ==
Winner (wager)	Loser (wager)	Location	Event	Date	Notes
El Faraón (hair)	Alfonso Dantés (hair)	Mexico City	Live event	1970s	
Cien Caras (mask)	Alfonso Dantés (hair)	Guadalajara, Jalisco	Live event	Unknown	
El Solitario (mask)	Alfonso Dantés (hair)	Mexico City	Live event	Unknown	
Enrique Vera (hair)	Alfonso Dantés (hair)	Mexico City	Live event	December 5, 1975	(Note: This was a triangle match that also included El Halcón.)
Mil Máscaras (mask)	Alfonso Dantés (hair)	Mexico City	Live event	February 22, 1977	(Note: This was a triangle match that also included El Halcon.)
El Faraón and Ringo Mendoza (hair)	Sangre Chicana and Alfonso Dantes (hair)	Mexico City	22. Aniversario de Arena México	April 22, 1978	
Alfonso Dantés (hair)	El Faraón (hair)	Mexico City	EMLL Live event	April 20, 1979	
Satoru Sayama (hair)	Alfonso Dantés (hair)	Mexico City	Live event	June 15, 1979	
Sangre Chicana and Alfonso Dantes (hair)	El Jalisco and Cobarde (hair)	Mexico City	Live event	December 5, 1980	
Alfonso Dantés (hair)	Halcón Ortiz (hair)	Mexico City	Live event	1981	
El Satánico (hair)	Alfonso Dantés (hair)	Guadalajara, Jalisco	Live event	August 9, 1985	
