= Tony Salazar =

Mexican professional wrestler and ring announcer

Personal information
- Born: Antonio Salazar Gómez; January 15, 1949 (age 77) Mexico City, Mexico

Professional wrestling career
- Ring name(s): Tony Salazar; Señor Tormenta; El Nene; Ulises
- Billed height: 1.78 m (5 ft 10 in)
- Billed weight: 88 kg (194 lb)
- Trained by: Raul Romero; Alejandro de Alba; Loco Hernández
- Debut: February 7, 1965
- Retired: 1990s

Antonio Salazar Gómez (born January 15, 1949) is a Mexican retired professional wrestler, who works as the ring announcer for Consejo Mundial de Lucha Libre's (CMLL) Sunday shows in Arena Coliseo. He is best known under the ring name Tony Salazar, although he has also competed as Señor Tormenta, El Nene and the masked Ulises during his wrestling career. In his career, he has held the NWA World Middleweight Championship twice, and the NWA World Light Heavyweight Championship once.

== Professional wrestling career ==
Tony Salazar made his professional wrestling debut in 1965 and soon after began working regularly for Empresa Mexicana de Lucha Libre, the world's oldest and Mexico's largest wrestling promotion. On August 13, 1978, Tony Salazar defeated Ringo Mendoza to win the NWA World Middleweight Championship, holding the title until February 3, 1979, when Mendoza regained it. Salazar would have an additional reign as Middleweight champion in 1981 when he won it from Sangre Chicana on January 18 and lost it to Chicana on March 13, 1981. The following month Salazar defeated Alfonso Dantés to win the NWA World Light Heavyweight Championship, the most prestigious title promoted in Mexico at the time. Salazar's run with the Light Heavyweight title lasted for almost a year until American David Morgan won it on March 22, 1982. Following his title loss Salazar worked as the enmascarado character Ulíses for some years, retiring in the early 1990s.

Tony Salazar is currently the ring announcer for Consejo Mundial de Lucha Libre's (CMLL; Previously known as EMLL) Sunday night shows in Arena Coliseo in Mexico City, Mexico as well as working behind the scenes as one of the people responsible for putting the shows together every Sunday.

== Family ==
Tony Salazar is the father of CMLL photographer/office-staff Alexis Salazar & CMLL wrestler Magnus, the uncle of Místico, as well as Argenis, Argos, Astro Boy, and Karonte Jr.. He is the brother-in-law of their father, who wrestled as Dr. Karonte.

== Championships and accomplishments ==
- Empresa Mexicana de la Lucha Libre

- NWA World Middleweight Championship (2 times)
- NWA World Light Heavyweight Championship (1 time)
- Copa Bobby Bonales (2018)
- Homenaje a Dos Leyendas honoree (2024)

== Luchas de Apuestas record ==
Winner (wager)	Loser (wager)	Location	Event	Date	Notes
Tony Salazar (hair)	Cacique Mara (hair)	Mexico City	Live event	March 19, 1976	
Tony Salazar (hair)	Ringo Mendoza (hair)	Mexico City	Live event	August 20, 1978	
El Faraón and Águila India (hair)	Sangre Chicana and Tony Salazar (hair)	Mexico City	Live event	1979	
Tony Salazar (hair)	Bruno Victoria (hair)	Mexico City	Live event	August 16, 1980	
Perro Aguayo (hair)	Tony Salazar (hair)	Mexico City	EMLL 49th Anniversary Show	September 17, 1982	
Tony Salazar (hair)	Coloso Colosetti (hair)	Mexico City	Live event	April 22, 1983	
Tony Salazar (hair)	Herodes (hair)	Mexico City	Live event	September 18, 1983	
Tony Salazar (hair)	Coloso Colosetti (hair)	Mexico City	27. Aniversario de Arena México	October 3, 1983	
Tony Salazar, Americo Rocca and Ringo Mendoza (hair)	Los Misioneros de la Muerte (hair) (El Signo, El Texano and Negro Navarro)	Mexico City	EMLL 53rd Anniversary Show	September 19, 1986	
Pirata Morgan (hair)	Tony Salazar (hair)	Mexico City	EMLL 54th Anniversary Show	September 18, 1987	
