= 1977 in professional wrestling =

1977 in professional wrestling describes the year's events in the world of professional wrestling.

== List of notable promotions ==
Only one promotion held notable shows in 1977.

| Promotion Name | Abbreviation |
|---|---|
| Empresa Mexicana de Lucha Libre | EMLL |
| New Japan Pro Wrestling | NJPW |

== Calendar of notable shows ==
| Date | Promotion(s) | Event | Location | Main Event |
|---|---|---|---|---|
| April 27 | EMLL | 21. Aniversario de Arena México | Mexico City, Mexico | Alfonso Dantés defeated Chavo Guerrero (c) in a singles match for the NWA World Light Heavyweight Championship |
| May 11 | NJPW | World League | Tokyo, Japan | Seiji Sakaguchi defeated The Masked Superstar |
| September 23 | EMLL | EMLL 44th Anniversary Show (1) | Mexico City, Mexico | Fishman defeated Sangre Chicana in a Lucha de Apuesta mask vs. mask vs. mask match; also in the match: El Cobarde |
| September 30 | EMLL | EMLL 44th Anniversary Show (2) | Mexico City, Mexico | Fishman defeated El Cobarde in a Lucha de Apuesta mask vs. mask match |
| December 9 | EMLL | Juicio Final | Mexico City, Mexico | El Faraón and Ringo Mendoza defeated Joe Palardy and Perro Aguayo in a Lucha de Apuestas, hair Vs. hair match |
(c) – denotes defending champion(s)

== Notable events ==
- April 30 – At the Baltimore Arena in Baltimore, Maryland. Superstar Billy Graham used both feet on the ropes to pin Bruno Sammartino to become the World Wide Wrestling Federation Heavyweight Champion.
- September 27 – Mr. Fuji and Professor Tanaka defeated Tony Garea and Larry Zbyszko to win the vacant World Wide Wrestling Federation Tag Team Champions in an elimination tournament.

== Accomplishments and tournaments ==
=== AJW ===
| Accomplishment | Winner | Date won | Notes |
|---|---|---|---|
| Rookie of the Year Decision Tournament | Yukie Urushibara (Lucy Kayama) | | |
| World League | Yumi Ikeshita | | |

== Awards and honors ==
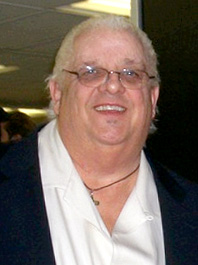
1977 PWI Wrestler of the Year, Dusty Rhodes

=== Pro Wrestling Illustrated ===
| Category | Winner |
|---|---|
| PWI Wrestler of the Year | Dusty Rhodes |
| PWI Tag Team of the Year | Gene and Ole Anderson |
| PWI Match of the Year | Bruno Sammartino vs. Superstar Billy Graham |
| PWI Most Popular Wrestler of the Year | André the Giant |
| PWI Most Hated Wrestler of the Year | Ken Patera |
| PWI Most Inspirational Wrestler of the Year | Bob Backlund |
| PWI Rookie of the Year | Ricky Steamboat |
| PWI Manager of the Year | The Grand Wizard |
| PWI Announcer of the Year | Gordon Solie |

== Championship changes ==
=== EMLL ===
NWA World Light Heavyweight Championship
incoming champion – Alfonso Dantés
| Date | Winner | Event/Show | Note(s) |
| February 11 | Chavo Guerrero | WWA show | |
| March 13 | Roddy Piper | WWA show | |
| March 15 | Chavo Guerrero | WWA show | |
| April 21 | Alfonso Dantés | EMLL show | |

NWA World Middleweight Championship
Incoming champion – El Faraón
| Date | Winner | Event/Show | Note(s) |
| March 11 | Perro Aguayo | EMLL show | |
| July 3 | Ringo Mendoza | EMLL show | |
| October 12 | Joe Plardy | EMLL show | |
| November 25 | El Faraon | EMLL show | |

NWA World Welterweight Championship
Incoming champion – Mano Negra
No title changes

Mexican National Heavyweight Championship
Incoming champion – El Halcon
| Date | Winner | Event/Show | Note(s) |
| March 13 | Gran Markus | EMLL show | |
| June 24 | El Halcon | EMLL show | |
| December 18 | Raul Mata | EMLL show | |

Mexican National Middleweight Championship
Incoming champion – Ringo Mendoza
| Date | Winner | Event/Show | Note(s) |
| February 28 | Perro Aguayo | EMLL show | |
| March 11 | Vacant | EMLL show | |
| April 14 | José Luis Mendieta | EMLL show | |
| November 19 | Sangre Chicana | EMLL show | |

Mexican National Lightweight Championship
Incoming champion – Flama Azul
| Date | Winner | Event/Show | Note(s) |
| April 10 | Americo Rocca | EMLL show | |
| July 1 | Flama Azul | EMLL show | |
| September 21 | Mario Valenzuela | EMLL show | |

Mexican National Light Heavyweight Championship
Incoming champion – Dr. Wagner
No title changes

Mexican National Welterweight Championship
Incoming champion – Blue Demon
| Date | Winner | Event/Show | Note(s) |
| February 27 | Fishman | EMLL show | |
| September 26 | Kung Fu | EMLL show | |
| November 23 | Fishman | EMLL show | |

Mexican National Women's Championship
Incoming champion – Uncertain
No title changes

=== NWA ===
NWA Worlds Heavyweight Championship
Incoming champion – Terry Funk
| Date | Winner | Event/Show | Note(s) |
| February 6 | Harley Race | House show | |

== Tournaments ==
=== IWE ===
| Accomplishment | Winner | Date won | Notes |
|---|---|---|---|
| IWA World Series | Rusher Kimura | March 26 | |

== Births ==
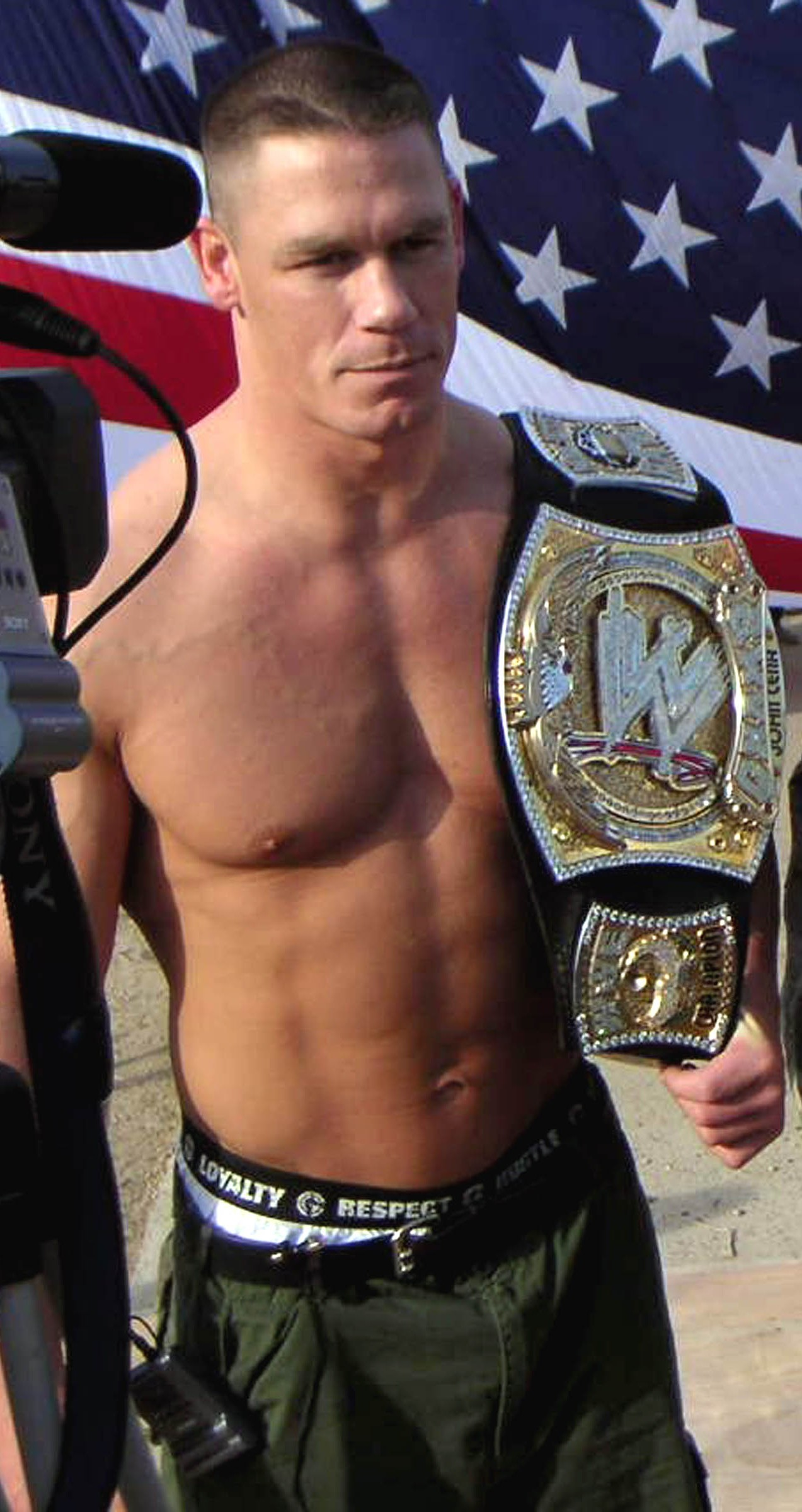
John Cena

- January 7 - Dustin Diamond (died in 2021)
- January 16 – Máscara Año 2000 Jr.
- January 17 – Kevin Fertig
- February 15 - Gran Naniwa (died in 2010)
- February 20 – Gail Kim
- February 24 - Floyd Mayweather Jr.
- February 28 -
  - Lance Archer
  - Aaron Aguilera
- March 8 - Michael Tarver
- March 20:
  - Caprice Coleman
  - Homicide
- March 24 – Inquisidor
- March 26 – Sylvain Grenier
- March 31 - Allison Danger
- April 4 - Stephan Bonnar (died in 2022)
- April 13 – Christian York
- April 19 - Jonny Storm
- April 20 - Jon Hugger
- April 23 – John Cena
- April 29 – Titus O'Neil
- May 9 – Averno
- May 11 – Bobby Roode
- May 21 - Micah Taylor (died in 2024)
- May 23 – Alan Stone
- May 25 – Alberto Del Rio
- June 1 - James Storm
- June 2 – A.J. Styles
- June 25 – Layla El
- June 26 – Mark Jindrak
- July 1 – Jocephus (died in 2021)
- July 5:
  - Kei Sato
  - Shu Sato
- July 12 – Brock Lesnar
- July 19 - Tony Mamaluke
- August 1:
  - Yoshi Tatsu
  - Prince Nana
- August 4 – Frankie Kazarian
- August 31 – Jeff Hardy
- September 4 – Awesome Kong
- September 5:
  - Sin Cara
  - Minoru Fujita
- September 7 – Molly Holly
- September 8 - X-Fly
- September 10 - Mike DiBiase (born 1977)
- September 11 - Josette Bynum
- September 25 - Atsushi Aoki (died in 2019)
- October 3 - Danny Basham
- October 20 - Steve Anthony
- November 15 -Cima
- November 20 – Dan Engler
- December 10 - Essa Rios
- December 12 - The Butcher (died in 2026)
- December 14 - Brain Damage (died in 2012)
- December 18 - The Messiah
- December 28 - Xavier (died in 2020)

== Debuts ==
- Uncertain debut date

- Michael Hayes
- Moondog Spot
- One Man Gang
- Nightmare Danny Davis
- Joe Malenko
- Brutus Beefcake
- B. Brian Blair
- The Grappler
- Tito Santana
- Gary Young
- Mami Kumano (All Japan Women)
- Lucy Kayama (All Japan Women)

- February 10 - George Takano
- June 11 - David Von Erich
- August 10 - Hulk Hogan
- September 5 - Tomi Aoyama (All Japan Women)
- October 23 - Bad News Brown
- November 8 - Takashi Ishikawa

== Retirements ==
- Penny Banner (1954–1977)
- Octavio Gaona (1934–1977)

== Deaths ==
- January 28 - George Bollas, 53
- March 15 - Antonino Rocca, 55
- July 1 - Karl Davis (wrestler), 69
- July 28 - Bull Ortega, 55
- August 27 - Billy Riley, 81
- September 27 - Roy Welch, 75
- October 8 - Joe Greenstein, 84
