= 1976 in professional wrestling =

1976 in professional wrestling describes the year's events in the world of professional wrestling.

== List of notable promotions ==
These promotions held notable shows in 1976.

Promotion Name	Abbreviation
Big Time Wrestling	BTW
Empresa Mexicana de Lucha Libre	EMLL
New Japan Pro Wrestling	NJPW
World Wide Wrestling Federation	WWWF

== Calendar of notable shows ==
Date	Promotion(s)	Event	Location	Main Event
April 23	EMLL	20. Aniversario de Arena México	Mexico City, Mexico	Fishman defeated El Faraón in a best two-out-of-three falls Lucha de Apuestas mask vs. mask match
May 11	NJPW	World League	Tokyo, Japan	Seiji Sakaguchi defeated Pedro Morales
June 5	BTW	Superbowl of Wrestling	Irving, Texas	Terry Funk (c) wrestled Fritz Von Erich to a double count-out in a singles match for the NWA World Heavyweight Championship
June 25/26	WWWF	Showdown at Shea	Queens, New York	Bruno Sammartino (c) defeated Stan Hansen by countout in a singles match for the WWWF World Heavyweight Championship
June 25/26	NJPW / various	The War of the Worlds	Tokyo, Japan	Muhammad Ali fought Antonio Inoki to a draw in a "Wrestler vs Boxer" Match for the Real World Martial Arts Championship (match broadcast via CCTV to other locations)
June 25/26	NJPW / various	The War of the Worlds	Atlanta, Georgia	Jack Brisco fought Dory Funk Jr. to a draw
June 25/26	NJPW / various	The War of the Worlds	Chicago, Illinois	Nick Bockwinkel (c) fought Verne Gagne to a draw for the AWA World Heavyweight Championship
June 25/26	NJPW / various	The War of the Worlds	Detroit, Michigan	The Sheik fought Pampero Firpo to a no contest
June 25/26	NJPW / various	The War of the Worlds	Houston, Texas	Terry Funk (c) defeated Rocky Johnson to retain the NWA World Heavyweight Championship
June 25/26	NJPW / various	The War of the Worlds	Los Angeles, California	Gory Guerrero defeated Roddy Piper
June 25/26	NJPW / various	The War of the Worlds	San Francisco, California	Pat Patterson defeated Mr. Fuji in a 2-out-of-3 Falls Match
September 24	EMLL	EMLL 43rd Anniversary Show	Mexico City, Mexico	El Faraón defeated Perro Aguayo in a best two-out-of-three falls match Lucha de Apuesta mask vs. hair match
December 19	EMLL	Juicio Final	Mexico City, Mexico	Mano Negra defeated Demonio Blanco in a best two-out-of-three falls Lucha de Apuestas, mask Vs. mask match
(c) – denotes defending champion(s)

== Awards and honors ==
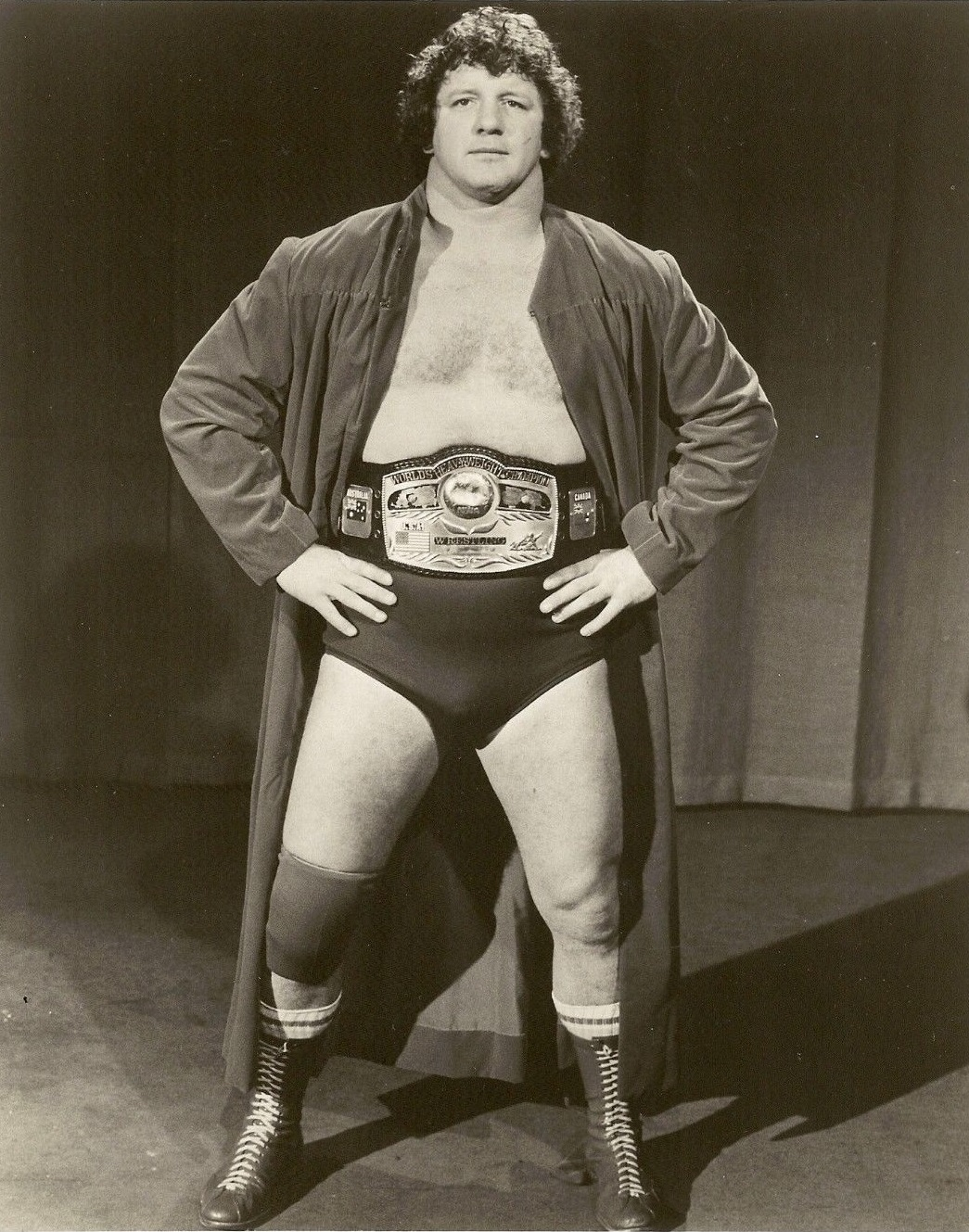
1976 PWI Wrestler of the Year, Terry Funk

=== Pro Wrestling Illustrated ===
Category	Winner
PWI Wrestler of the Year	Terry Funk
PWI Tag Team of the Year	The Executioners (#1 and #2)
PWI Match of the Year	Bruno Sammartino vs. Stan Hansen
PWI Most Popular Wrestler of the Year	Wahoo McDaniel
PWI Most Hated Wrestler of the Year	Stan Hansen
PWI Most Inspirational Wrestler of the Year	Bruno Sammartino
PWI Rookie of the Year	Bob Backlund
PWI Woman of the Year	Sue Green
PWI Midget Wrestler of the Year	Lord Littlebrook
PWI Manager of the Year	Bobby Heenan

== Notable events and incidents ==
- May 11- The Executioners bested Louis Cerdan and Tony Parisi to become the new WWWF Tag Team Champions.
- June 26 – Muhammad Ali vs. Antonio Inoki
- October 26 – The Executioners were stripped of their WWWF Tag Team Championship when a third executioner was used in their title defense. That third executioner turns out to be Nikolai Volkoff.
- December 7 – Billy White Foot and Chief Jay Strongbow defeated The Executioners and Nikolai Volkoff and Tor Kamata in a three-team tournament to become the new WWWF Tag Team Champions.

== Accomplishments and tournaments ==
=== AJW ===
Accomplishment	Winner	Date won	Notes
Rookie of the Year Decision Tournament	Victoria Fujimi		
World League	Jackie Sato		

== Championship changes ==
=== EMLL ===
NWA World Light Heavyweight Championship
incoming champion – Dr. Wagner
Date	Winner	Event/Show	Note(s)
February 27	Adorable Rubí	EMLL show	
July 16	Carlos Plata	EMLL show	
October 24	Alfonso Dantés	EMLL show	

NWA World Middleweight Championship
Incoming champion – Perro Aguayo
Date	Winner	Event/Show	Note(s)
October 22	El Faraon	EMLL show	

NWA World Welterweight Championship
Incoming champion – Blue Demon
Date	Winner	Event/Show	Note(s)
April 9	Fishman	EMLL show	
November 19	Mano Negra	EMLL show	

Mexican National Heavyweight Championship
Incoming champion – El Halcon
No title changes

Mexican National Middleweight Championship
Incoming champion – Ringo Mendoza
No title changes

Mexican National Lightweight Championship
Incoming champion – Tauro
Date	Winner	Event/Show	Note(s)
October 30	Flama Azul	EMLL show	

Mexican National Light Heavyweight Championship
Incoming champion – Alfonso Dantes
Date	Winner	Event/Show	Note(s)
April 11	Dr. Wagner	EMLL show	

Mexican National Welterweight Championship
Incoming champion – Fishman
Date	Winner	Event/Show	Note(s)
April 9	Vacant	EMLL show	
July 30	Blue Demon	EMLL show	

Mexican National Women's Championship
Incoming champion – Uncertain
No title changes

=== NWA ===
NWA Worlds Heavyweight Championship
Incoming champion – Terry Funk
No title changes

== Births ==
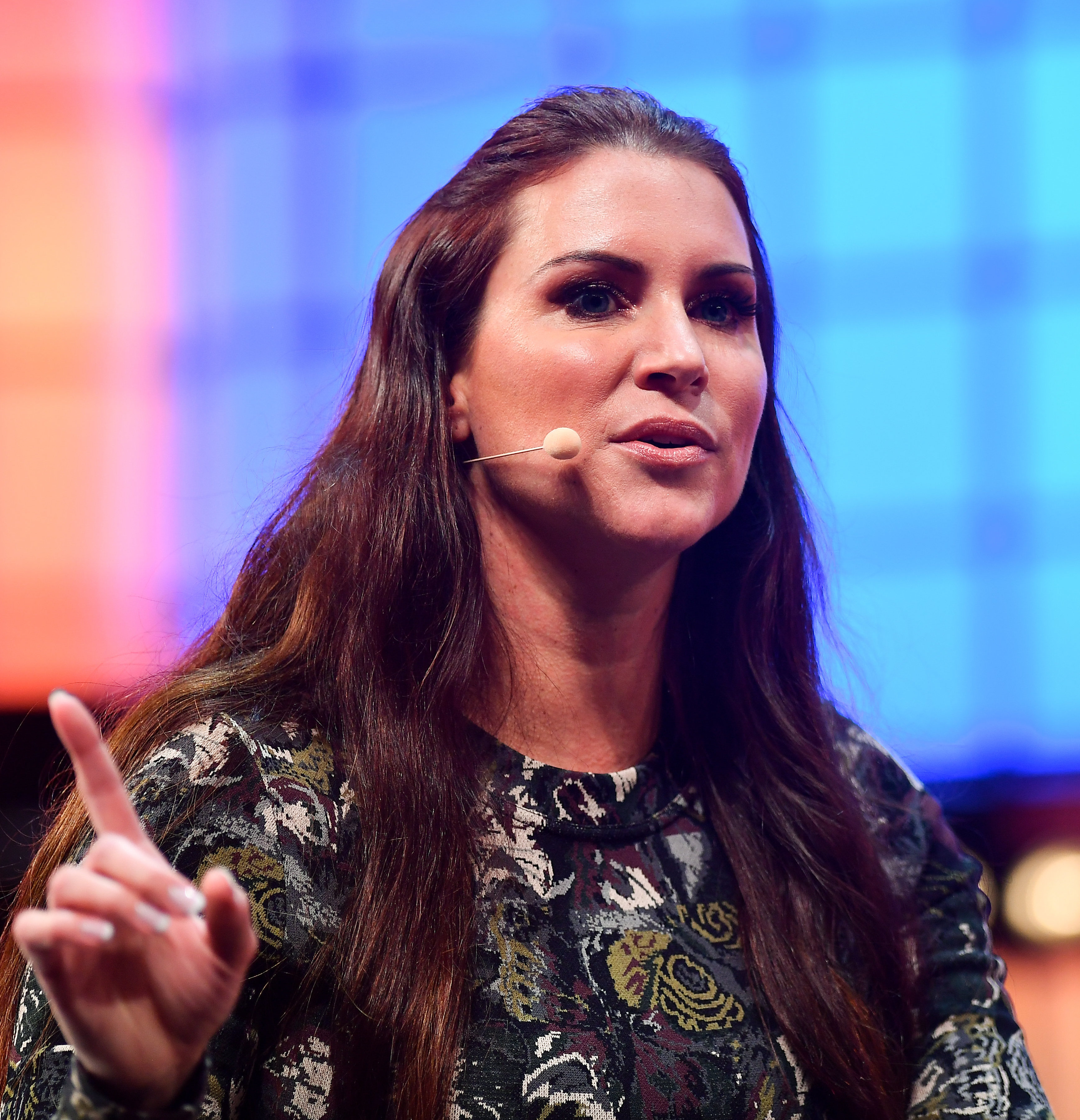
Stephanie McMahon

- January 9:
  - Pasión Kristal (d. 2021)
  - Todd Grisham
- January 10 – Donovan Morgan
- January 23 – Nigel McGuinness
- January 24 – Chikayo Nagashima
- January 25 – Gorgeous George
- January 28 – Emiko Kado (d. 1999)
- February 2 – Dragon Kid
- February 15 – Yinling
- February 23 – Muhammad Yone
- February 24 – Monster Clown
- March 6 – Ken Anderson/Mr. Kennedy
- March 10 – Jax Dane (d. 2024)
- March 16 – Carlos Amano
- March 18 – Mike Quackenbush
- March 21 – El Hijo de Cien Caras (d. 2010)
- March 23 – Tyson Tomko
- March 28 – Rory McAllister
- April 8 – Ryuji Ito
- April 16 – Phil Baroni
- May 9 – Shawn Osborne (died in 2011)
- May 22 – Yumi Fukawa
- May 25 – Ricky Banderas
- June 11 – MsChif
- June 11 – Sonoko Kato
- June 13 – Sicodelico Jr.
- June 30 – Gilbert Yvel
- July 16 – Bobby Lashley
- July 22 – Abdullah Kobayashi
- August 10 – Amish Roadkill
- August 15 – The Bruiser (died in 2020)
- September 10 – Matt Morgan
- September 23 – Yoshinobu Kanemaru
- September 24 - Stephanie McMahon
- September 25 – Dr. Heresy
- October 4 – Emi Sakura
- October 14 – G. Q. Money
- October 18 – Maybach Taniguchi
- November 13 – Hiroshi Tanahashi
- November 17 – Kikutaro
- November 21 – Cassidy O'Reilly
- November 22 – Lash LeRoux
- November 23 – Kristina Laum
- November 25 – Adam Firestorm (d. 2009)
- November 26 – Maven
- December 17 – Nosawa Rongai
- December 23 – Jamie Noble
- December 27 – Tim Arson (d. 2015)

== Debuts ==
- Uncertain debut date

- Bret Hart
- Kevin Von Erich
- Barry Orton
- Ricky Steamboat
- Paul Orndorff
- Ken Wayne
- Brett Sawyer

- March 5 – Mach Hayato (UWF)
- March 13 – Scott Irwin
- May – Bobby Eaton and Nancy Kumi (All Japan Women's)
- May 24 – Super Parka
- May 30 – Victoria Fujimi (All Japan Women's)
- November 13 – Genichiro Tenryu

== Retirements ==
- Mitsu Arakawa (1953–1976)
- Bob Geigel (1950–1976)
- George Gordienko (1946–1976)
- Danny Hodge (1959–1976, wrestled one match in 1983)
- Stan Kowalski (1948–1976)
- Betty Niccoli (1963–1976)
- Antonino Rocca (1942–1976)
- Hans Schmidt (1949–1976)
- Kinji Shibuya (1952–1976)

== Deaths ==
- April 21 – Sir Dudley Clements, 28
- May 20 – Bobby Pearce (rower), 70
- June 11 – Toots Mondt, 82
- July 26:
  - Sam Bass (wrestler), 41
  - Frank Hester (wrestler), 39
  - Pepe Lopez, 39
- September 26 – Sheik Ali, 49
- November 10 – Al Haft, 89
