= Juicio Final (1977) =

Mexican professional wrestling event

- Promotion: Empresa Mexicana de Lucha Libre
- Date: December 9, 1977
- City: Mexico City, Mexico
- Venue: Arena México
- Attendance: 15,000

Event chronology
← Previous; EMLL 44th Anniversary Show	Next →: 21. Aniversario de Arena México

Juicio Final chronology
← Previous; 1976	Next → 1978

Juicio Final (1977) (Spanish for "Final Judgement" 1977) was a professional wrestling supercard show, scripted and produced by Consejo Mundial de Lucha Libre (CMLL), which took place on December 9, 1977, in Arena México, Mexico City, Mexico. The show served as the year-end finale for CMLL before Arena México, CMLL's main venue, closed down for the winter for renovations and to host Circo Atayde. The shows replaced the regular Super Viernes ("Super Friday") shows held by CMLL since the mid-1930s.

For the 1977 Juicio Final main event the teams of El Faraón/Ringo Mendoza and Joe Palardy/Perro Aguayo faced off in a Lucha de Apuestas with all four wrestlers' hair on the line. Faraón and Mendoza won the match, leading to Palardy and Aguayo having all their hair shaved off afterwards. In the semi-main event match Ultraman and Fishman wrestled to a double count out in a match for the Mexican National Welterweight Championship. The show featured four additional matches.

== Production ==
=== Background ===
For decades Arena México, the main venue of the Mexican professional wrestling promotion Consejo Mundial de Lucha Libre (CMLL), would close down in early December and remain closed into either January or February to allow for renovations as well as letting Circo Atayde occupy the space over the holidays. As a result, CMLL usually held a "end of the year" supercard show on the first or second Friday of December in lieu of their normal Super Viernes show. The first year when CMLL used the name "El Juicio Final" ("The Final Judgement") for their year-end supershow was 1955. It is no longer an annually recurring show, but instead held intermittently, sometimes several years apart and not always in the same month of the year. All Juicio Final shows have been held in Arena México in Mexico City, Mexico which is CMLL's main venue, its "home".

=== Storylines ===
The 1977 Juicio Final show featured seven professional wrestling matches scripted by CMLL with some wrestlers involved in scripted feuds. The wrestlers portray either heels (referred to as rudos in Mexico, those that play the part of the "bad guys") or faces (técnicos in Mexico, the "good guy" characters) as they perform.

== Results ==
No.	Results	Stipulations
1	Flama Azul defeated Américo Rocca by disqualification	Singles match
2	Divino Roy defeated El Imposter	Singles match
3	Blue Demon and Mano Negra defeated Karloff Lagarde and Sangre Chicana	Tag team match
4	Mil Máscaras and Raúl Mata defeated Alfonso Dantes and Gran Markus	Tag team match
5	Fishman (c) vs. Ultraman ended in a double countout	Singles match for the Mexican National Welterweight Championship
6	El Faraón and Ringo Mendoza defeated Joe Palardy and Perro Aguayo	Best two-out-of-three falls Lucha de Apuestas, hair Vs. hair match
(c) / – the champion(s) heading into the match
