= Triplemanía VII =

1999 Lucha Libre AAA World Wide event

- Logo of Triplemanía VII
- Promotion: AAA
- Date: June 11, 1999
- City: Madero, Mexico
- Venue: Convention Center
- Attendance: 13,000

Pay-per-view chronology
| ← Previous; Rey de Reyes | Next → Verano de Escándalo |

Triplemanía chronology
| ← Previous; VI | Next → VIII |

Triplemanía VII was the seventh Triplemanía professional wrestling show promoted by AAA. The show took place on June 11, 1999, in Madero, Mexico. The Main event featured a Six-man "Lucha Libre rules" tag team match between the teams of Perro Aguayo, Octagón and El Cobarde II and El Texano, Perro Aguayo Jr. and Sangre Chicana. In the semi-main event Heavy Metal and El Felino defended the hair of their father, referee Pepe "Tropi" Casas while Kick Boxer and Thai Boxer defended the hair of referee El Tirantes. As a result, El Tirantes had his hair shaved off after the match.

== Production ==
=== Background ===
In early 1992 Antonio Peña was working as a booker and storyline writer for Consejo Mundial de Lucha Libre (CMLL), Mexico's largest and the world's oldest wrestling promotion, and was frustrated by CMLL's very conservative approach to professional wrestling, specifically the style of wrestling known as Lucha Libre (Spanish for "freestyle wrestling"). He joined forced with a number of younger, very talented wrestlers who felt like CMLL was not giving them the recognition they deserved and decided to split from CMLL to create Asistencia Asesoría y Administración, later known simply as "AAA" or Triple A. After making a deal with the Televisa television network AAA held their first show in April 1992. The following year Peña and AAA held their first Triplemanía event, building it into an annual event that would become AAA's Super Bowl event, similar to the WWE's WrestleMania being the biggest show of the year. The 1999 Triplemanía was the seventh year in a row AAA held a Triplemanía show and the 14th overall show under the Triplemanía banner.

=== Storylines ===
The Triplemanía VII show featured six professional wrestling matches with different wrestlers involved in pre-existing scripted feuds, plots and storylines. Wrestlers were portrayed as either heels (referred to as rudos in Mexico, those that portray the "bad guys") or faces (técnicos in Mexico, the "good guy" characters) as they followed a series of tension-building events, which culminated in a wrestling match or series of matches.

== Results ==
| No. | Results | Stipulations | Times |
|---|---|---|---|
| 1 | Los Spice Boys (Billy Boy Jimmy Boy, Randy Boy and Vangelis) defeated Los Payasos (Coco Rojo, Coco Verde, Coco Amarillo and Coco Loco) | Best two-out-of-three falls eight-man "Atómicos"tag team match | — |
| 2 | Los Vatos Locos (Charly Manson, El Picudo, Nygma and May Flowers) vs. Los Vipers (Histeria, Psicosis, Maniaco and Mosco de la Merced) ended in a double disqualification | Best two-out-of-three falls eight-man "Atómicos" tag team match | — |
| 3 | Alebrije, Path Finder, Latin Lover and Máscara Sagrada defeated Espectro Jr. and Los Vipers (Abismo Negro, Cibernético and Electroshock) | Best two-out-of-three falls eight-man "Atómicos" tag team match | — |
| 4 | Pentagón defeated Xóchitl Hamada by disqualification | Singles match | 10:27 |
| 5 | Heavy Metal and El Felino defeated Kick Boxer and Thai Boxer | Lucha de Apuestas, "Hair of Pepe Casas vs. Hair of El Tirantes" match | — |
| 6 | Perro Aguayo, Octagón and El Cobarde II defeated El Texano, Perro Aguayo Jr. and Sangre Chicana | Best two-out-of-three falls six-man "Lucha Libre rules" tag team match | — |
