= EMLL 44th Anniversary Show =

EMLL 44th Anniversary Show may refer to:

- EMLL 44th Anniversary Show (1), a professional wrestling major show on September 23, 1977, in Arena México, Mexico City, Mexico
- EMLL 44th Anniversary Show (2), a professional wrestling major show on September 30, 1977, in Arena México, Mexico City, Mexico
