= Juicio Final (1976) =

Mexican professional wrestling event

- Promotion: Empresa Mexicana de Lucha Libre
- Date: December 19, 1976
- City: Mexico City, Mexico
- Venue: Arena México
- Attendance: 17,000

Event chronology
← Previous; EMLL 43rd Anniversary Show	Next →: 21. Aniversario de Arena México

Juicio Final chronology
← Previous; 1975	Next → 1977

Juicio Final (1976) (Spanish for "Final Judgement" 1976) was a professional wrestling supercard show, scripted and produced by Consejo Mundial de Lucha Libre (CMLL), which took place on December 19, 1976, in Arena México, Mexico City, Mexico. The show served as the year-end finale for CMLL before Arena México, CMLL's main venue, closed down for the winter for renovations and to host Circo Atayde. The shows replaced the regular Super Viernes ("Super Friday") shows held by CMLL since the mid-1930s.

The Juicio Final show was headlined by Mano Negra defeated Demonio Blanco and Demonio Blanco both putting their mask on the line. In the end Mano Negra won the match two-falls-to-one, forcing Demonio Blanco to unmask and reveal his real name, Manny Coronado. Perro Aguayo wrestled Ringo Mendoza to a draw via a double pin, which allowed Mendoza to retain the Mexican National Middleweight Championship. In the fourth match of the night Gran Markus kept his mask safe as he defeated Tigre Colombiano, forcing Colombiano to have his hair shaved off.

== Production ==
=== Background ===
For decades Arena México, the main venue of the Mexican professional wrestling promotion Consejo Mundial de Lucha Libre (CMLL), would close down in early December and remain closed into either January or February to allow for renovations as well as letting Circo Atayde occupy the space over the holidays. As a result, CMLL usually held a "end of the year" supercard show on the first or second Friday of December in lieu of their normal Super Viernes show. 1955 was the first year where CMLL used the name "El Juicio Final" ("The Final Judgement") for their year-end supershow. It is no longer an annually recurring show, but instead held intermittently sometimes several years apart and not always in the same month of the year either. All Juicio Final shows have been held in Arena México in Mexico City, Mexico which is CMLL's main venue, its "home".

=== Storylines ===
The 1976 Juicio Final show featured six professional wrestling matches scripted by CMLL with some wrestlers involved in scripted feuds. The wrestlers portray either heels (referred to as rudos in Mexico, those that play the part of the "bad guys") or faces (técnicos in Mexico, the "good guy" characters) as they perform.

== Results ==
No.	Results	Stipulations
1	Jerry London vs. El Reo ended in an unknown manner	Singles match
2	Cachorro Mendoza and Gallo Tapado vs As Charro and Karloff Lagarde ended in an unknown manner	Tag team match
3	Carlos Plata and El Halcón vs Adorable Rubi and Tony Salazar ended in an unknown manner	Tag team match
4	Gran Markus defeated Tigre Colombiano	Best two-out-of-three falls Lucha de Apuestas, mask Vs. hair match
5	Perro Aguayo vs. Ringo Mendoza (c) ended in a draw	Singles match for the Mexican National Middleweight Championship
6	Mano Negra defeated Demonio Blanco	Best two-out-of-three falls Lucha de Apuestas, mask Vs. mask match
(c) / – the champion(s) heading into the match
