= Heavy Metal (wrestler) =

Mexican professional wrestler

Personal information
- Born: Erick Francisco Casas Ruiz; October 4, 1970 (age 55) Mexico City, Distrito Federal
- Family: Casas

Professional wrestling career
- Ring name(s): Heavy Metal; Canelo Casas
- Billed height: 1.70 m (5 ft 7 in)
- Billed weight: 82 kg (181 lb; 12.9 st)
- Billed from: Mexico City, Distrito Federal
- Trained by: Pepe Casas; Raúl Reyes; Negro Casas; El Felino
- Debut: February 14, 1988

Erick Francisco Casas Ruiz (born October 4, 1970) is a Mexican professional wrestler currently working under the ring name Heavy Metal for AAA. He is the son of referee Pepe Casas and part of the Casas wrestling family; the brother of Negro Casas and Felino.

== Professional wrestling career ==
=== Consejo Mundial de Lucha Libre ===
Erick Casas started his professional career wrestling as Canelo Casas for Consejo Mundial de Lucha Libre (CMLL). As Canelo Casas he, along with Mr. Cid, was able to win the Naucalpan Tag Team Championship. He also won the Mexican National Welterweight Championship defeating Ciclon Ramirez in 1990.

=== Lucha Libre AAA Worldwide / AAA ===
Erick Casas left CMLL when he decided to go to the newly created promotion Asistencia Asesoría y Administración, later known simply as AAA, in 1992. He changed his gimmick to Heavy Metal where he was a rudo and had a rock-star look which was based on heavy metal music. His first victory as Heavy Metal was the Mexican National Welterweight Championship, when he defeated Rey Misterio Jr. in 1993. He retained his title against Rey Misterio twice and El Hijo Del Santo. Santo and Metal would rival over Santo's WWA Welterweight Championship and over Metal's Mexican National Welterweight Champion. Both wrestlers would put both of their titles on the line in the same match where winner takes all. Heavy Metal lost his title to Santo in the fall of 1993 when both of them put both of their titles on the line. After the loss of the title, Metal turned into a tecnico. He formed a team with Latin Lover where both of them feuded with Rocco Valente, Tony Arce and Vulcano. Rocco Valente and Tony Arce were the Mexican National Tag Team Champions at the time. Heavy Metal and Latin Lover had a shot for the title and won the title in 1994. After Metal and Lover won the title, Arce challenged Metal in a luchas de apuestas (bet match) match which Metal accepted. The match took place just two weeks after Metal and Lover won the title. Metal was able to beat Arce and so Arce hair was shaved.

On November 6, 1994, the event When Worlds Collide Metal teamed with Rey Misterio Jr. and Latin Lover to face Fuerza Guerrera, Madonna's Boyfriend, and Psicosis in a tradition lucha libre six-man tag match. The final saw that Fuerza Guerrera making Heavy Metal submit. Fuerza Guerrera and his son Juventud Guerrera later started a feud with Heavy Metal and Latin Lover over their tag title. Heavy Metal and Latin Lover lost the tag title to them in late 1994. The teams later had a rematch in 1995 but Metal turned on his partner when he turned rudo again. The duo as a team ended after that. Later in 1995 Metal became a tecnico again. In early 1996, AAA announce that they were creating a new championship call AAA Americas Trios Champion, there was a tournament held for it too with a block A and block B. Heavy Metal teamed with Latin Lover and Winners for the block A tournament. The team was able to beat El Mexicano, Torero and Tornado on the first round. In the semi-final, the team defeated Blue Demon Jr., Principe Zafiro and Volador. In the finals, the team lost to Los Villanos (Villano III, Villano IV and Villano V). Heavy Metal teamed with Latin Lover and Cien Caras and making Caras the leader of the team on block B. On the first round they beat Frisbee, La Parka, and Rey Misterio Jr. On the next round they defeated Killer, Vegas, and Yeti. In the semi-finals they beat Cibernetico, Jerry Estrada, and Pierroth. In the finals the team was close to win but lost to Los Villanos (Villano III, Villano IV and Villano V).

Heavy Metal later appeared in the World Wrestling Federation (now WWE) because of AAA and WWF having a free exchange talent agreement. His first appearance was at the Royal Rumble where he teamed with Jerry Estrada and Fuerza Guerrera to face Héctor Garza, Perro Aguayo, and El Canek. The results saw Perro Aguayo pinned Heavy Metal for the win. In 1997 at the event of Rey de Reyes, Heavy Metal participated in the first ever Rey de Reyes tournament. Heavy Metal defeated Blue Demon Jr., Maniaco and May Flowers to qualify for the final. In the final, Metal was close to winning but lost to Latin Lover, making him the first winner of the Rey de Reyes. Heavy Metal was later involved in a Lucha De Apuestas match at Triplemanía. Heavy Metal teamed with Leon Negro and defeated the teams of Latin Lover and Perro Aguayo Jr., Jerry Estrada and El Picudo and May Flowers and Halcón Dorado Jr. Halcón Dorado Jr. got his hair shaved off when he got pinned by Leon Negro. AAA later had another Triplemania event in 1997 this time Heavy Metal was feuding with Sangre Chicana. At the event, Chicana defeated Metal by disqualification. In the fall AAA had a new event called Verano de Escandalo. Heavy Metal was in a Steel Cage Elimination Luchas de Apuestas Match teaming with Perro Aguayo and Perro Aguayo Jr. against Sangre Chicana, El Picudo and El Cobarde. The final saw El Cobarde getting his head shaved. By winter, AAA had another new event called Guerra de Titanes. Heavy Metal was involved in a Steel Cage Luchas de Apuestas "hair vs. hair" match which also included Perro Aguayo Jr., El Picudo, and Sangre Chicana. Perro Aguayo beat El Picudo making him getting his head shaved.

By 1998, Metal's feud with Sangre Chicana hadn't ended yet this time in a Lucha De Apuestas at the Rey de Reyes event. Heavy Metal won and Sangre Chicana's hair got shaved off. Heavy Metal then started a feud with masked shoot-style wrestler Kick Boxer. At the Triplemania main event, Heavy Metal faced Kick Boxer but lost the match. At the Verano de Escandalo event, Metal teamed with Blue Demon Jr. to face Abismo Negro and Kick Boxer in a Steel Cage Match. Heavy Metal and Blue Demon Jr. defeated Abismo Negro and Kick Boxer. At the Guerra de Titanes event, Heavy Metal would team with Octagón to face Pentagón and Kick Boxer in a Steel Cage Match which they won. In 1999, Metal was still feuding with Kick Boxer. This time Kick Boxer had an ally name Thai Boxer. At the 1999 Rey de Reyes event, Antonio Silva, Carlos Gutierrez, Kick Boxer and Thai Boxer defeated Heavy Metal, La Parka Jr., Mascara Sagrada Jr. and Perro Aguayo Jr. in a Steel Cage Match. By the time of Triplemania, Metal's brother El Felino was there to ally with Heavy Metal. El Felino and Heavy Metal both feuded with Kick Boxer and Thai Boxer and had a Luchas de Apuestas "Hair vs. Hair" match where Heavy Metal and El Felino defended their dad's hair while Kick Boxer and Thai Boxer defended El Tirante's hair at Triplemania. They won making their opponents referee El Tirantes hair shaved off. At the Verano de Escandalo event, Heavy Metal and Octagón together against Jaque Mate and Kick Boxer in a Steel Cage Match Luchas de Apuestas "loser loses mask or hair" match. Kick Boxer was unmasked due to his loss. After Kick Boxer lost his mask, the rivalry didn't end just yet. The event Guerra de Titanes, Heavy Metal teamed with Perro Aguayo Jr. to beat Abidies Irison and Kick Boxer. Thus this finally ended their heated rivalry.

In 2000, Heavy Metal turned back into a rudo. Heavy Metal started to feud with Cibernetico over his AAA Campeón de Campeones Champion. In 2001 Heavy Metal defeated Cibernetico in a Steel Cage Match for the AAA Campeón de Campeones Championship. Two months later, Cibernetico regained the title. In 2002, Triplemania event saw Heavy Metal beat El Brazo, Electroshock, El Oriental, May Flowers, and Sangre Chicana in a Luchas de Apuestas "Hair vs. Hair" where each wrestler represented a referee. Sangre Chicana lost the match which results that El Tirantes get his head shaved. In 2003, Triplemania event saw Heavy Metal beat Pirata Morgan, El Texano and Sangre Chicana in a Luchas de Apuestas "Hair vs. Hair". As a result, Pirata Morgan had his head shaved since he was pinned by Heavy Metal.

=== Total Nonstop Action Wrestling ===
Heavy Metal went to Total Nonstop Action Wrestling (TNA) because AAA's working agreement with the company and also to replace Juventud Guerrera's place for the America's X-Cup. Along with Abismo Negro, Mr. Águila and Hector Garza, "Team Mexico" was successful in winning the America's X-Cup. They later retained it against Team Canada as well. After the America's X-cup was over, Heavy Metal returned to AAA.

=== Return to AAA ===
After TNA, Heavy Metal returned to AAA. Since his return, he turned back into a tecnico. At the Verano de Escandalo event, Heavy Metal, El Intocable, El Zorro, beat Histeria, and Psicosis II and Mosco de la Merced II in a Steel Cage Match where the last man in the cage would lose his hair or his mask. Mosco de la Merced II was unmasked due to his loss. Heavy Metal later left AAA in late 2004.

=== International Wrestling Revolution Group ===
Heavy Metal and his brothers including Negro Casas and El Felino went to International Wrestling Revolution Group (IWRG) in 2005. The duo teamed and was able to capture the IWRG Intercontinental Trios Champion by defeating Black Tiger, Pantera II, Pentagon Black. The team lost the titles to Scorpio Jr., Veneno, and Cerebro Negro in early 2006. Heavy Metal defeated Scorpio Jr. for the IWRG Intercontinental Heavyweight Champion in 2005 but later lost back to him in late 2005.

=== Return to Consejo Mundial de Lucha Libre ===
Erick Casas return to CMLL in 2005. Erick Casas remained under his Heavy Metal gimmick even though he had never been Heavy Metal in CMLL in the past. Heavy Metal participated in the Leyenda de Azul tournament in 2005. In the Leyenda de Azul first round he lost to Rey Bucanero. In the Torneo Gran Alternativa 2006, Heavy Metal was a veteran; teaming with El Texano Jr. In the quarter-final, the duo lost to Loco Max and Rey Bucanero. Heavy Metal participated in the Leyenda de Azul 2006. In the First Round, he lost to Black Warrior. In 2007, Heavy Metal teamed with Super Nova for the Torneo Gran Alternativa. In the first round, the team lost to the winners of that night La Sombra and Místico. In 2008, Heavy Metal lost his hair to Toscano in a Lucha de Apuesta. This was the first time Heavy Metal has lost in a Lucha de Apuesta match as Heavy Metal.

=== Return to AAA ===
At AAA's show in Mexico City, an event competing directly against CMLL's major event Homenaje a Dos Leyendas, Heavy Metal made surprising return to AAA, attacking Konnan and joining forces with Cibernético in his fight against Konnan's La Legión Extranjera faction. After a four-month break due to an injury, Heavy Metal returned to AAA on February 4, 2011, and entered a Best of Five Hair vs. Hair series with Electroshock, with whom he had feuded prior to his injury. The fifth match of the series, a Two Out of Three Falls Bull Terrier match, took place on March 18 at Rey de Reyes and ended with Heavy Metal defeating Electroshock, after a guitar shot, for his hair. After the match both Heavy Metal and Electroshock were attacked by members of La Sociedad, bringing the former rivals together to fight a common enemy. On June 18 at Triplemanía XIX, Electroshock, Heavy Metal and Joe Líder defeated Silver King, Último Gladiador and Chessman in a Tables, Ladders and Chairs match. On March 31, 2013, Heavy Metal teamed up with Danny Casas to represent the Casas family in IWRG's La Guerra de Familias ("War of the Families") tournament. The team lost to Los Junior Dinamitas (Cien Caras Jr. and Hijo de Máscara Año 2000) in the first round. On June 16 at Triplemanía XXI, Heavy Metal defeated Chessman to become the number one contender to the AAA Mega Championship. He received his title shot later that same event, but was defeated by the defending champion, El Texano Jr.

== Personal life ==
Erick Casas is the son of referee Pepe Casas and the brother of Negro Casas and Felino.

== Championships and accomplishments ==
- Asistencia Asesoría y Administración / AAA
  - AAA Campeón de Campeones Championship (1 time)
  - Mexican National Tag Team Championship (1 time) – with Latin Lover
  - Mexican National Welterweight Championship (2 times)
- International Wrestling Revolution Group
  - IWRG Intercontinental Heavyweight Championship (1 time)
  - IWRG Intercontinental Trios Championship (1 time) – with Negro Casas and El Felino
  - Rock y Lucha Championship (1 time, current)
- Kaoz Lucha Libre
  - Kaoz Heavyweight Championship (1 time)
- Pro Wrestling Illustrated
  - PWI ranked him #174 of the 500 best singles wrestlers of the PWI 500 in 1995
  - PWI ranked him #178 of the Top 500 Singles Wrestlers of the "PWI Years"
- Total Nonstop Action Wrestling
  - America's X Cup (2004) – with Mr. Águila, Juventud Guerrera, Abismo Negro, and Héctor Garza
- Universal Wrestling Association
  - UWA World Light Heavyweight Championship (1 time)
  - UWA World Junior Light Heavyweight Championship (1 time)
- World Wrestling Association
  - WWA Welterweight Championship (1 time)
- Other titles
  - Naucalpan Tag Team Championship (1 time) – with Mr. Cid

== Luchas de Apuestas record ==
Winner (wager)	Loser (wager)	Location	Event	Date	Notes
El Pantera II and Canelo Casas (hair)	Mr. Cid and Bestia Verde (hair)	Naucalpan, Mexico State	Live event	September 11, 1988	
Ultraman 2000 (hair)	Canelo Casas (hair)	Tijuana, Baja California	Live event	February 3, 1989	
Canelo Casas (hair)	El Mestizo (hair)	Mexico City	Live event	August 1989	
Heavy Metal (hair)	Rambo (hair)	N/A	Live event	N/A	
Heavy Metal (hair)	Barba Negra (hair)	Xochiaca, State of Mexico	Live event	November 15, 1992	
Heavy Metal (hair)	Jerry Estrada (hair)	Aguascalientes, Aguascalientes	Triplemanía II-A	April 26, 1994	
Heavy Metal (hair)	Tony Arce (hair)	Xalapa, Veracruz	Live event	September 28, 1994	
Heavy Metal (hair)	Sangre Chicana (hair)	Naucalpan, State of Mexico	Live event	March 1, 1998	
El Felino and Heavy Metal (hair of Pepe Casas)	Kick Boxer and Thai Boxer (Hair of El Tirantes)	Tamaulipas, Mexico	Triplemanía VII	June 11, 1999	(Note: El Felino and Heavy Metal defeated Kick Boxer and Thai Boxer in a Pepe Casas' hair vs. Tirantes' hair match.)
Heavy Metal (hair)	Kick Boxer (mask)	Mexico City	Verano de Escándalo	September 17, 1999	(Note: Steel cage match that also included Octagón and Jaque Mate.)
Héctor Garza (hair)	Heavy Metal (hair)	Mexico City	Guerra de Titanes	November 23, 2001	(Note: Match also included Perro Aguayo Jr. and Latin Lover.)
Heavy Metal	Sangre Chicana (hair)	Monterrey	Triplemanía X	July 5, 2002	(Note: As a result of a pre-match stipulation referee El Tirantes had his head shaved instead of Sangre Chicana. Also in the match; El Oriental, Electroshock, El Brazo and May Flowers, each representing an AAA referee.)
Heavy Metal (hair)	Pirata Morgan (hair)	Naucalpan, State of Mexico	Triplemanía XI	June 15, 2003	(Note: Match also included Sangre Chicana and El Texano.)
Heavy Metal (hair)	El Brazo (hair)	Monterrey	Verano de Escándalo	August 31, 2003	(Note: Steel cage match that also included El Zorro, Sangre Chicana, El Texano and Óscar Sevilla.)
Heavy Metal (hair)	Mosco de la Merced (mask)	Orizaba, Veracruz	Verano de Escándalo	October 16, 2004	(Note: Steel cage match that also included El Zorro, El Incotable, Psicosis and Histeria.)
Heavy Metal (hair)	Toscano (hair)	Mexico City	Super Viernes	May 23, 2008	(Note: Match also included Perro Aguayo Jr.)
El Texano Jr. (hair)	Heavy Metal (hair)	Mexico City	Infierno en el Ring	June 13, 2008	(Note: Steel cage match that also included Alex Koslov, Damian 666, Marco Corleone, Mr. Aguila, Shocker, El Terrible, Negro Casas and Perro Aguayo Jr.)
Heavy Metal (hair)	Electroshock (hair)	Aguascalientes, Aguascalientes	Rey de Reyes	March 18, 2011	(Note: Two Out of Three Falls Bull Terrier match; Match #5 in a Best of Five series at Rey de Reyes.)
