= AAA Americas Heavyweight Championship =

Professional wrestling championship

Details
- Promotion: AAA
- Date established: February 2, 1996
- Date retired: July 23, 2005
Statistics
- First champion: Konnan
- Final champions: Sangre Chicana (won August 20, 2004)
- Longest reign: Sangre Chicana (337 days)
- Shortest reign: The Barbarian (105 days)

The AAA Americas Heavyweight Championship is a former championship contested for in the Mexican lucha libre promotion AAA, it was promoted as a secondary title to AAA's main "World" title. Being a professional wrestling championship it is not won legitimately; it is instead won via a scripted ending to a match or awarded to a wrestler because of a storyline. Konnan was the first AAA Americas Heavyweight champion, a title he won by defeating the Killer at the end of a tournament. The title was originally intended to be the top heavyweight title in AAA but when Konnan left the promotion in 1996 to work exclusively for World Championship Wrestling (WCW) and took the championship belt with him the title was quietly ignored by AAA. Initially when Konnan joined WCW he would wear the Americas title with the commentators referring to it as "the Mexican Championship" but the belt was the AAA Americas title. The belt remained in Konnan's possession until he started working with AAA again around 2004, where he turned over the belt. Sangre Chicana became the second AAA Americas Heavyweight Champion after winning a tournament for the title in 2004, defeating Latin Lover. By 2006 Sangre Chicana went into semi-retirement and stopped working for AAA all together, when Sangre Chicana left AAA the title was once again quietly dropped.

== Title history ==
Key
No.	Overall reign number
Reign	Reign number for the specific champion
Days	Number of days held

No.	Champion	Championship change			Reign statistics		Notes	Ref.
No.	Champion	Date	Event	Location	Reign	Days	Notes	Ref.
Lucha Libre AAA Worldwide (AAA)
1	Konnan	February 2, 1996	AAA Live event	Querétaro, Mexico	1	242	Defeat The Killer in a tournament final to become the first champion.	
—	Vacated	October 1, 1996	—	—	—	—	Championship vacated when Konnan left AAA to exclusively wrestle for WCW.	
2	The Barbarian	May 26, 2001	Triplemanía IX	Mexico City, Mexico	1	105	Won a tournament final.	
3	Konnan	September 8, 2001	Septiembre Negro en Aniversario 2001	Bayamón, Puerto Rico	2	126	Also defeat Fidel Sierra for the WWC Caribbean Heavyweight Championship in Caguas, Puerto Rico.	
—	Vacated	January 12, 2002	—	—	—	—	The AAA Américas Heavyweight Championship retired after has been unified with the WWC Caribbean Heavyweight Championship.	
4	Sangre Chicana	August 20, 2004	AAA Live event	Puebla, Mexico	1	337	Defeat Latin Lover to win the vacant title.	(Note: Sangre Chicana left AAA sometime in 2006 but the exact date is not known, thus the exact length of Sangre Chicana's reign is undetermined but at least 794 days.)
—	Deactivated	July 23, 2005	—	—	—	—		

== Combined Reigns ==
Rank	Wrestler	No. of reigns	Combined days
1	Konnan	2	366
2	Sangre Chicana	1	337
3	The Barbarian	1	105
