= EMLL 44th Anniversary Show (1) =

Mexican Professional wrestling show

EMLL 44th Anniversary Show #1
- Promotion: Empresa Mexicana de Lucha Libre
- Date: September 23, 1977
- City: Mexico City, Mexico
- Venue: Arena México
- Attendance: 18,000

Event chronology
← Previous; 21. Aniversario de Arena México	Next →: 22. Aniversario de Arena México

EMLL Anniversary Show chronology
← Previous; 43rd Anniversary	Next → 44th Anniversary (2)

Mexican professional wrestling promotion Empresa Mexicana de Lucha Libre (EMLL) celebrated their 44th anniversary with two professional wrestling major shows centering on the anniversary date in mid to late September. The first EMLL 44th Anniversary Show (Spanish: 44. Aniversario de EMLL) took place on September 23, 1977, in Arena México, Mexico City, Mexico to commemorate the anniversary of EMLL, which over time became the oldest professional wrestling promotion in the world. The Anniversary show is EMLL's biggest show of the year. The EMLL Anniversary Show series is the longest-running annual professional wrestling show, starting in 1934.

== Production ==
=== Background ===
The 1977 Anniversary show commemorated the 44th anniversary of the Mexican professional wrestling company Empresa Mexicana de Lucha Libre (Spanish for "Mexican Wrestling Promotion"; EMLL) holding their first show on September 22, 1933 by promoter and founder Salvador Lutteroth. EMLL was rebranded early in 1992 to become Consejo Mundial de Lucha Libre ("World Wrestling Council"; CMLL) signal their departure from the National Wrestling Alliance. With the sales of the Jim Crockett Promotions to Ted Turner in 1988 EMLL became the oldest, still-operating wrestling promotion in the world. Over the years EMLL/CMLL has on occasion held multiple shows to celebrate their anniversary with 1977 being the last year where EMLL held multiple anniversary shows, which is considered the biggest show(s) of the year, CMLL's equivalent of WWE's WrestleMania or their Super Bowl event. CMLL has held their Anniversary show at Arena México in Mexico City, Mexico since 1956, the year the building was completed, over time Arena México earned the nickname "The Cathedral of Lucha Libre" due to it hosting most of EMLL/CMLL's major events since the building was completed. Traditionally EMLL/CMLL holds their major events on Friday Nights, replacing their regularly scheduled Super Viernes show.

=== Storylines ===
The event featured at undetermined number of professional wrestling matches with different wrestlers involved in pre-existing scripted feuds, plots and storylines. Wrestlers were portrayed as either heels (referred to as rudos in Mexico, those that portray the "bad guys") or faces (técnicos in Mexico, the "good guy" characters) as they followed a series of tension-building events, which culminated in a wrestling match or series of matches. Due to the nature of keeping mainly paper records of wrestling at the time no documentation has been found for some of the matches of the show.

== Event ==
In the first of only two verified matches on the show Alfonso Dantés successfully defended the NWA World Light Heavyweight Championship against El Faraón ("The Pharaoh"), two falls to one. The main event of the show was a three-way Lucha de Apuesta where all three competitors risked their mask on the outcome of the match. During the match El Cobarde turned on his friend Fishman and escaped the match with his mask, leaving Fishman to face Sangre Chicano in the final stages of the match. Fishman overcame Sangre Chicana, forcing him to unmask after the loss. Sangre Chicana revealed that his birthname was Andrés Durán Reyes.

== Results ==
No.	Results	Stipulations
1	Alfonso Dantés (c) defeated El Faraón	Best two-out-of-three falls for the NWA World Light Heavyweight Championship
2	Fishman defeated Sangre Chicano, also in the match: El Cobarde	Best two-out-of-three falls Lucha de Apuesta mask vs. mask vs. mask match
(c) / – the champion(s) heading into the match
