= EMLL 45th Anniversary Show =

Mexican Professional wrestling show

- Promotion: Empresa Mexicana de Lucha Libre
- Date: September 22, 1978
- City: Mexico City, Mexico
- Venue: Arena México
- Attendance: Unknown

Event chronology
← Previous; 22. Aniversario de Arena México	Next →: 23. Aniversario de Arena México

EMLL Anniversary Show chronology
← Previous; 44th Anniversary (2)	Next → 46th Anniversary

The EMLL 45th Anniversary Show (Spanish: 45. Aniversario de EMLL) was a professional wrestling major show event produced by Empresa Mexicana de Lucha Libre (EMLL) that took place on September 22, 1978, in Arena México, Mexico City, Mexico. The event commemorated the 45th anniversary of EMLL, which would become the oldest professional wrestling promotion in the world. The Anniversary show is EMLL's biggest show of the year, their Super Bowl event. The EMLL Anniversary Show series is the longest-running annual professional wrestling show, starting in 1934.

== Production ==
=== Background ===
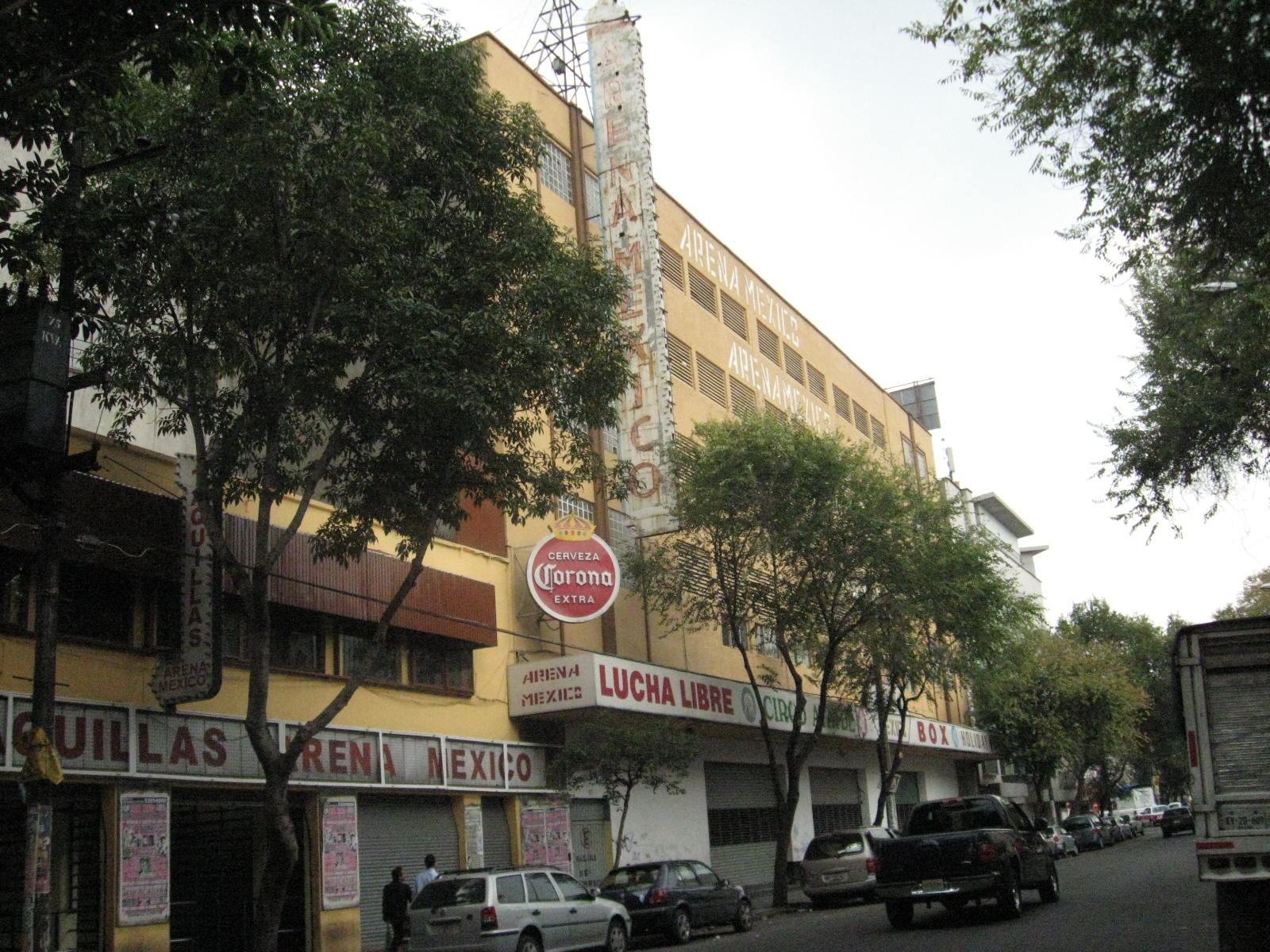
Arena México, CMLL's main venue and location of the Anniversary Show

The Mexican Lucha libre (professional wrestling) company Consejo Mundial de Lucha Libre (CMLL) started out under the name Empresa Mexicana de Lucha Libre ("Mexican Wrestling Company"; EMLL), founded by Salvador Lutteroth in 1933. Lutteroth, inspired by professional wrestling shows he had attended in Texas, decided to become a wrestling promoter and held his first show on September 21, 1933, marking what would be the beginning of organized professional wrestling in Mexico. Lutteroth would later become known as "the father of Lucha Libre" . A year later EMLL held the EMLL 1st Anniversary Show, starting the annual tradition of the Consejo Mundial de Lucha Libre Anniversary Shows that have been held each year ever since, most commonly in September.

Over the years the anniversary show would become the biggest show of the year for CMLL, akin to the Super Bowl for the National Football League (NFL) or WWE's WrestleMania event. The first anniversary show was held in Arena Modelo, which Lutteroth had bought after starting EMLL. In 1942–43 Lutteroth financed the construction of Arena Coliseo, which opened in April 1943. The EMLL 10th Anniversary Show was the first of the anniversary shows to be held in Arena Coliseo. In 1956 Lutteroth had Arena México built in the location of the original Arena Modelo, making Arena México the main venue of EMLL from that point on. Starting with the EMLL 23rd Anniversary Show, all anniversary shows have been held in the arena that would become known as "The Cathedral of Lucha Libre". On occasion EMLL held more than one show labelled as their "Anniversary" show, such as two 33rd Anniversary Shows in 1966. Over time the anniversary show series became the oldest, longest-running annual professional wrestling show. In comparison, WWE's WrestleMania is only the fourth oldest still promoted show (CMLL's Arena Coliseo Anniversary Show and Arena México anniversary shows being second and third). Traditionally CMLL holds their major events on Friday Nights, replacing their regularly scheduled Super Viernes show.

=== Storylines ===
The event featured at least two professional wrestling matches with different wrestlers involved in pre-existing scripted feuds, plots and storylines. Wrestlers were portrayed as either heels (referred to as rudos in Mexico, those that portray the "bad guys") or faces (técnicos in Mexico, the "good guy" characters) as they followed a series of tension-building events, which culminated in a wrestling match or series of matches. Due to the nature of keeping mainly paper records of wrestling at the time no documentation has been found for some of the matches of the show.

== Event ==
In one of the few confirmed matches of the show Tony Salazar put the NWA World Middleweight Championship on the line against the Japanese born Satoru Sayama. Sayama had come to work in Mexico after having a hard time finding work in Japan due to his small stature, which made him better suited for the high flying, Lucha Libre style. Salazar was able to wart off the challenger, defeating Sayama two falls to one. The main event of the show was a double Lucha de Apuestas, or bet match between the team of Sangre Chicana and Rubí Rubalcava and the team of El Cobarde and Dragon Rojo. Dragón Rojo was the only enmascarado, or masked wrestler, in the match so he risked his match while the rest risked their hair on the outcome of the match. Chicana and Rubalcava won the match, two falls to one and thus El Cobarde was shaved bald while Dragón Rojo was forced to remove his mask and reveal his birth name as per Lucha Libre traditions.

== Aftermath ==
The name Dragón Rojo would be used again decades later when Dragón Rojo Jr. was introduced, a storyline grandson of the original Dragón Rojo even though no blood relation exists between the two.

== Results ==
No.	Results	Stipulations
1	Tony Salazar (c) defeated Satoru Sayama	Best two-out-of-three falls match for the NWA World Middleweight Championship
2	Sangre Chicana and Rubí Rubalcava defeated El Cobarde and Dragón Rojo	Best two-out-of-three Lucha de Apuestas hair and mask vs. hair and hair match
(c) / – the champion(s) heading into the match
