= UWA World Light Heavyweight Championship =

Professional wrestling championship

UWA World Light Heavyweight Championship Campeonato Mundial Semi Completo de UWA
- The championship belt

Details
- Promotion: Universal Wrestling Association (UWA); Mexican independent circuit Asistencia Asesoría y Administración (AAA); Just Tap Out (JTO)
- Date established: November 25, 1975
- Date retired: September 16, 2007
Statistics
- First champion: Ray Mendoza
- Most reigns: El Zorro (5 times)
- Longest reign: Fishman (1,217 days)
- Shortest reign: Mr. Águila (19 days)

The UWA World Light Heavyweight Championship (Campeonato Mundial Semi Completo de UWA in Spanish) was a singles professional wrestling championship initially promoted by the Mexican Lucha Libre wrestling based promotion Universal Wrestling Association (UWA) from 1975 until the UWA closed in 1995 and since then been defended on the Mexican independent circuit until 2007. By the year 2000 the title became a mainstay in Asistencia Asesoría y Administración (AAA) when it was won by El Zorro who worked for AAA. The official definition of the Light Heavyweight weight class in Mexico is between 92 kg (203 lb) and 97 kg (214 lb), but is not always strictly enforced. (Note: The most recent case of this is Mephisto's holding the CMLL World Welterweight Championship, a belt with a 78 kg (172 lb) upper limit despite weighing 90 kg (200 lb).)

Chessman was the last UWA Light Heavyweight champion recognized by Asistencia Asesoría y Administración having defeated El Zorro in April, 2007. in 2007 Chessman competed in the tournament to crown the first ever AAA Mega Champion and put his title on the line in the tournament. In the finals he lost to El Mesias by disqualification, while the title does not change hands on a disqualification the UWA World Light Heavyweight Championship was eliminated as the purpose of the tournament was to find one top champion and clear up the muddled championship picture in AAA. A new version of the title was introduced in Japan in February 2021 by Just Tap Out (JTO), sometimes promoted as the UWA World Middleweight Championship.

As a professional wrestling championship, the championship was not won not by actual competition, but by a scripted ending to a match determined by the bookers and match makers. (Note: Hornbaker (2016) p. 550: "Professional wrestling is a sport in which match finishes are predetermined. Thus, win–loss records are not indicative of a wrestler's genuine success based on their legitimate abilities – but on now much, or how little they were pushed by promoters") On occasion the promotion declares a championship vacant, which means there is no champion at that point in time. This can either be due to a storyline, (Note: Duncan & Will (2000) p. 271, Chapter: Texas: NWA American Tag Team Title [World Class, Adkisson] "Championship held up and rematch ordered because of the interference of manager Gary Hart") or real life issues such as a champion suffering an injury being unable to defend the championship, (Note: Duncan & Will (2000) p. 20, Chapter: (United States: 19th Century & widely defended titles – NWA, WWF, AWA, IW, ECW, NWA) NWA/WCW TV Title "Rhodes stripped on 85/10/19 for not defending the belt after having his leg broken by Ric Flair and Ole & Arn Anderson") or leaving the company. (Note: Duncan & Will (2000) p. 201, Chapter: (Memphis, Nashville) Memphis: USWA Tag Team Title "Vacant on 93/01/18 when Spike leaves the USWA.")

== Title history ==
Key
No.	Overall reign number
Reign	Reign number for the specific champion
Days	Number of days held
N/A	Unknown information

No.	Champion	Championship change			Reign statistics		Notes	Ref.
No.	Champion	Date	Event	Location	Reign	Days	Notes	Ref.
Universal Wrestling Association
1	Ray Mendoza	November 25, 1975	Live event	Mexico City, Mexico	1	117	Won a tournament to become the first champion.	(Note: Duncan & Will (2000) p. 397, Chapter: MEXICO: UWA World Light Heavyweight Title [Flores, Mora])
2	Audaz	March 21, 1976	Live event	Veracruz, Mexico	1	154		
3	Ray Mendoza	August 22, 1976	Live event	Monterrey, Nuevo León	2	214		
4	El Solitario	March 24, 1977	Live event	Ciudad Juárez, Chihuahua	1	584		
5	Ray Mendoza	October 29, 1978	Live event	Naucalpan, México	3	371		
6	Gran Hamada	November 4, 1979	Live event	Naucalpan, México	1	203		
7	Perro Aguayo	May 25, 1980	Live event	Naucalpan, México	1	201		
8	Fishman	December 12, 1980	Live event	Naucalpan, México	1	79		
9	Villano III	March 1, 1981	Live event	Naucalpan, México	1	140		
10	Fishman	July 19, 1981	Live event	Naucalpan, México	2	481		
11	Sangre Chicana	November 12, 1982	Live event	Mexico City, Mexico	1	107		
12	Fishman	February 27, 1983	Live event	Naucalpan, México	3	224		
13	Sangre Chicana	October 9, 1983	Live event	Naucalpan, México	2	N/A	The length of this reign in uncertain.	
—	Vacated	February 1984	—	—	—	—	Championship vacated when Sangre Chicana could not defend due to injuries.	
14	Fishman	April 1, 1984	Live event	Naucalpan, México	4	861	Defeated Villano III in a tournament final.	
15	Villano I	August 10, 1986	Live event	Naucalpan, México	1	160		
16	Zandokan	January 17, 1987	Live event	Naucalpan, México	1	1,171		
17	Gran Hamada	April 2, 1990	Live event	Mexico City, Mexico	2	311		
18	El Signo	February 7, 1991	Live event	Mexico City, Mexico	1	98		
19	Villano III	May 16, 1991	Live event	Mexico City, Mexico	2	168		
20	El Signo	October 31, 1991	Live event	Mexico City, Mexico	2	155		
21	Villano V	April 3, 1992	Live event	Nezahualcóyotl, México	1	212		
22	El Texano	November 1, 1992	Live event	Naucalpan, México	1	364		
23	Silver King	October 31, 1993	Live event	Naucalpan, México	1	62		
24	Villano V	January 1, 1994	Live event	Nezahualcóyotl, México	2	N/A	The length of this reign in uncertain.	
—	Vacated	1995	—	—	—	—	The title was vacated and later inactivated after UWA closed down.	
Asistencia Asesoría y Administración (AAA)
25	Adrián el Exótico	September 17, 1995	Live event	Nezahualcóyotl, México	1	299		
26	Prince Maya	July 12, 1996	Live event	N/A	1	N/A	The length of this reign in uncertain.	
Championship history is unrecorded from July 1996 to 1999.
27	El Cobarde	1999	Live event	N/A	1	N/A	The length of this reign in uncertain.	
28	Heavy Metal	April 16, 2000	Live event	Nuevo Laredo, Tamaulipas	1	418		
29	Electroshock	June 8, 2001	Live event	Albuquerque, NM	1	N/A	The length of this reign in uncertain.	
Championship history is unrecorded from June 2001 to 2002.
30	El Zorro	2002	Live event	Albuquerque, NM	1	N/A	The length of this reign in uncertain.	
31	Mr. Águila	July 3, 2003	Live event	Toluca, Mexico	1	87		
32	El Zorro	September 28, 2003	Live event	Guadalajara, Jalisco	2	266		
33	Mr. Águila	June 20, 2004	Live event	Naucalpan, México	2	19		
34	El Zorro	July 9, 2004	Live event	Tijuana, Baja California	3	23		
35	Charly Manson	August 1, 2004	Live event	Guadalupe, Nuevo León	1	395		
36	El Zorro	August 31, 2005	Live event	Monterrey, Nuevo León	4	123		
37	Hator	January 1, 2006	Live event	Monterrey, Nuevo León	1	N/A	The length of this reign in uncertain.	
38	El Zorro	April 2007	Live event	N/A	5	N/A	Zorro won the title no later than this date. The length of the reign in uncertain.	
39	Chessman	August 18, 2007	Live event	Salamanca, Guanajuato	1	29		
—	Deactivated	September 16, 2007	—	Guadalajara, Jalisco	—	—	Title inactivated when Chessman is eliminated from the AAA Mega Championship tournament. In February 2021, Japanese promotion Just Tap Out (JTO), re-names the Japanese version of the UWA World Middleweight Championship to the "UWA World Light Heavyweight Championship".	

== Combined reigns ==
†	Indicates the current champion
¤	The exact length of at least one title reign is uncertain.

Rank	Wrestler	No. of reigns	Combined days
1	Fishman	4	2,001
2	Zandokan	1	1,171
3	El Solitario	1	584
4	Gran Hamada	2	514
5	Heavy Metal	1	418
6	El Zorro	5	412
7	Charly Manson	1	395
8	Ray Mendoza	3	371
9	El Texano	1	364
10	Villano III	2	308
11	Adrián el Exótico	1	299
12	El Signo	2	253
13	Villano V	2	¤212
14	Perro Aguayo	1	201
15	Villano I	1	160
16	Audaz	1	154
17	Sangre Chicana	2	¤107
18	Mr. Águila	2	106
19	Silver King	1	62
20	Chessman	1	29
21	El Cobarde	1	¤N/A
21	Electroshock	1	¤N/A
21	Hator	1	¤N/A
21	Prince Maya	1	¤N/A
