= Ultraman (wrestler) =

Mexican professional wrestler (born 1947)

Personal information
- Born: Milo Ventura Chávez; July 14, 1947 (age 79) Piedra Larga, Coroneo, Guanajuato, Mexico
- Children: Ultraman Jr. (Son)

Professional wrestling career
- Ring names: El Dinámico; Milo Ventura; Ultraboy; Ultraman
- Billed height: 1.76 m (5 ft 9 in)
- Billed weight: 89 kg (196 lb)
- Trained by: Chico Hernánez; Alejandro de Alba
- Debut: 1964
- Retired: 2019

Milo Ventura Chávez (born July 14, 1947) is a Mexican professional wrestler, best known under the ring name Ultraman. He is the father of Ultraman Jr., but is not related to the first wrestler to use that name, who is now known as Starman. He originally used the name El Dinámico when he made his debut in 1964 and later worked under the name Milo Ventura from 1968 to 1975.

While he was unmasked in Mexico in 1987 he continued to wrestle under a mask in Japan, where he was very popular due to the character being based on the Ultraman television character. Chávez, El Solar and Super Astro formed a trio known as Los Cadetes del Espacio ("The Space Cadets").

== Championships and accomplishments ==
- Empresa Mexicana de Lucha Libre

- Mexican National Middleweight Championship (1 time)

== Luchas de Apuestas record ==
Winner (wager)	Loser (wager)	Location	Event	Date	Notes
Dinamico (mask)	Zeus (mask)	Atlixco, Puebla	Live event	September 15, 1968	
Milo Ventura (hair)	El Polaco (hair)	August 21, 1970	Tijuana, Baja California	Live event	
Ultraman (mask)	El Maya (mask)	N/A	Live event	August 26, 1975	
Ultraman (mask)	Médico II (mask)	N/A	Live event	September 12, 1975	
Ultraman (mask)	Dr. Z II (mask)	N/A	Live event	October 15, 1975	
Ultraman (mask)	Vengador Negro (mask)	N/A	Live event	November 20, 1975	
Ultraman (mask)	Rebelde Rojo (mask)	Naucalpan, State of Mexico	Live event	April 17, 1977	(Note: Finals of a "losers advance" Ruleta de la Muerte tournament.)
Ultraman and Estrella Blanca (masks)	Zeus (hair ) and Pantera Azul (mask)	Mexico City, Mexico	Live event	June 19, 1977	
Ultraman (mask)	Príncipe Azul	Monterrey, Nuevo León	Live event	August 21, 1977	(Note: Teamed up with Matemático and lost an Australianos suicidas to the trio of Frankenstein, Jungla Negra I and II and were forced to wrestle each other.)
Ultraman (mask)	León Negro (hair)	Mexico City, Mexico	Live event	August 27, 1978	
Ultraman (mask)	Shazam (mask)	Mexico City, Mexico	UWA event	July 13, 1980	(Note: Lost a relevos suicida match to America Salvaje and Villano III and were forced to wrestle each other as a result.)
Ultraman (mask)	América Salvaje	Mexico City, Mexico	Live event	June 28, 1981	
Ultraman (mask)	América Salvaje (hair)	Mexico City, Mexico	Live event	July 26, 1981	
Ultraman (mask)	Alfa Centauris (mask)	N/A	Live event	June 1982	(Note: Lost a relevos suicida to America Salvaje and Villano II and were forced to wrestle.)
Ultraman (mask)	La Sombra (mask) (Note: Not the most recent La Sombra.)	Naucalpan, Mexico State	Live event	July 24, 1983	
Ultraman (mask)	La Sombra (hair)	Naucalpan, Mexico State	Live event	August 14, 1983	
Los Cadetos del Espacio (masks) (El Solar, Super Astro and Ultraman)	Los Temerarios (hairs) (Black Terry, Jose Luis Feliciano and Lobo Rubio)	Naucalpan, Mexico State	Live event	July 8, 1984	
Brazo de Oro (mask)	Ultraman (mask)	Tijuana, Baja California	Live event	September 3, 1987	
Cinta de Oro (mask)	Ultraman (mask)	Ciudad Juarez, Chihuahua	Live event	September 9, 1987	
Sangre Chicana (hair)	Ultraman (hair)	N/A	Live event	1987	
Jerry Estrada (hair)	Ultraman (hair)	N/A	Live event	1988	
Ultraman (hair)	Babe Sharon (hair)	Nuevo Laredo, Tamaulipas	Live event	June 20, 1988	
Perro Aguayo (hair)	Ultraman (hair)	Mexico City, Mexico	Live event	July 16, 1988	
