= Fishman (wrestler) =

Mexican professional wrestler

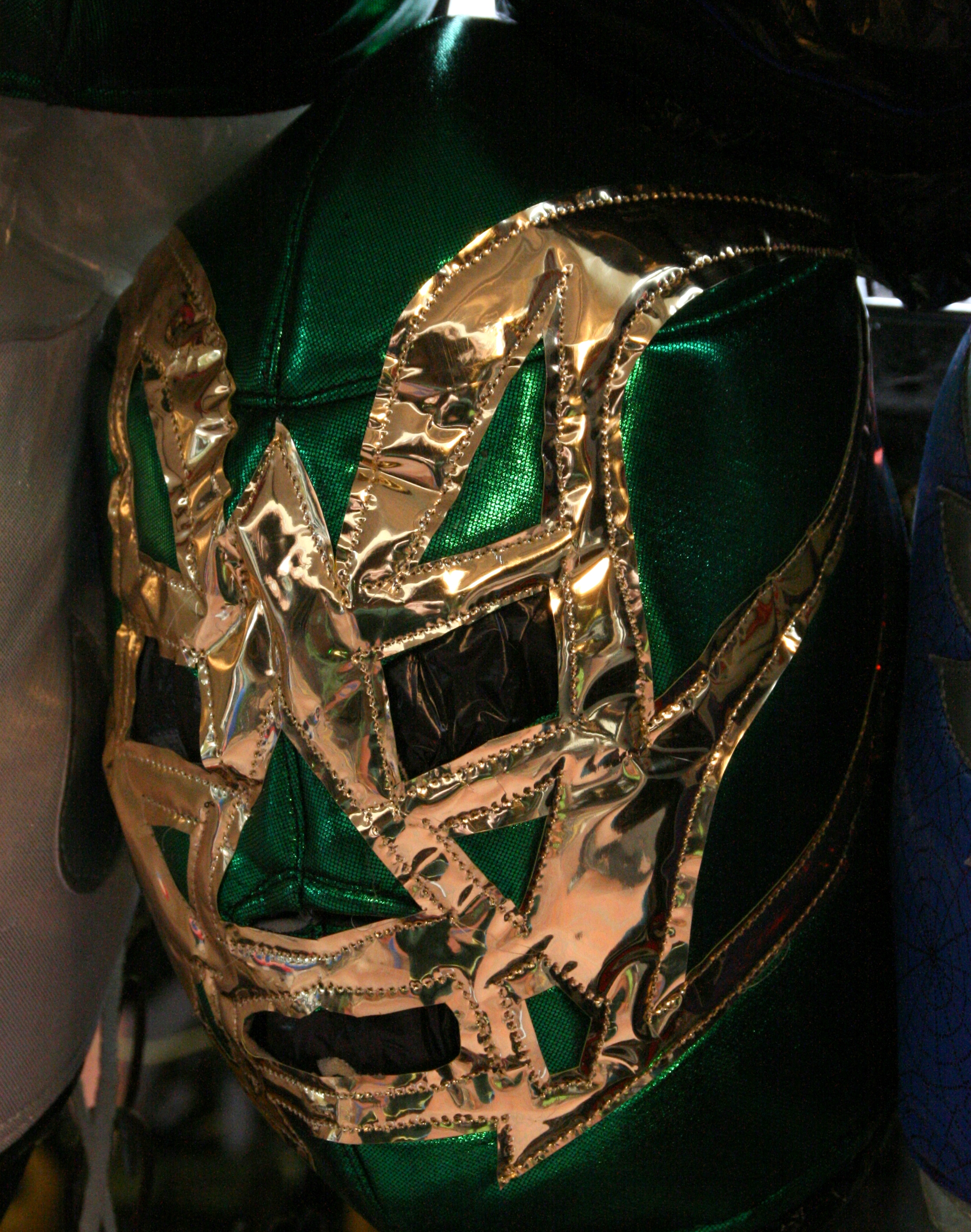
- Fishman's distinctive mask

Personal information
- Born: José Ángel Nájera Sánchez; January 6, 1951 Torreón, Coahuila, Mexico
- Died: April 8, 2017 (aged 66)
- Spouses: Lola González (divorced); Leslie González (divorced)
- Children: Black Fish (son); El Hijo de Fishman (son); El Único de Ciudad Juárez (son)
- Website: Facebook page

Professional wrestling career
- Ring name(s): Goliath Reyes; Titán; Fishman
- Billed height: 1.73 m (5 ft 8 in)
- Billed weight: 99 kg (218 lb; 15.6 st)
- Trained by: Marco Tulio; Bulldog Villegas; El Rebelde; Sunny War Cloud
- Debut: 1969
- Retired: 2012

José Ángel Nájera Sánchez (January 6, 1951 – April 8, 2017) was a Mexican professional wrestler, best known under the ring name Fishman. Fishman was one of the top wrestlers in the mid-1970s and 1980s and worked for Empresa Mexicana de Lucha Libre, the Universal Wrestling Association, the World Wrestling Association and AAA in Mexico as well as frequent trips to Japan and the United States. Nájera was unmasked after losing a match in 2000 and retired shortly afterwards. Three of his sons are all masked professional wrestlers known by their ring names Black Fish, El Hijo de Fishman and El Único de Ciudad Juárez.

== Personal life ==
Nájera was born on January 6, 1951, in Torreón, Coahuila, Mexico, with his family relocating to Ciudad Juárez, Chihuahua, while he was still very young. At an early age his mother and aunts would bring Nájera along when they would watch professional wrestling shows at the local Toreo de Cuartro Caminos bullfighting arena from the time he was nine years old. During his formative years Nájera cited both Black Shadow and Blue Demon as his idols, favoring the rudos (term used in Mexico to refer to a heel professional wrestlers, or "bad guys") of the era over técnicos (the "good guys") such as El Santo.

Nájera was married to María González, a professional wrestler who worked under the name Lola González, but the two later divorced. Nájera would later marry Leslie González (no relation to Maria González), but that marriage also ended in divorce. It has not been confirmed which wife is the mother of two of Nájera's sons, only that his first son was born out of wedlock. Nájera's sons all followed in his footsteps by becoming masked wrestlers and as such their birth names are not revealed per Mexican wrestling style called lucha libre traditions. While it is not uncommon in lucha libre for wrestlers to license their names to wrestlers who pretend to be second-generation wrestlers, (Note: For example Cien Caras Jr. and Hijo de Cien Caras are not the biological son of Cien Caras, but instead paid for the rights to the name.) Black Fish (originally Fishman Jr.), El Hijo de Fishman and El Único de Ciudad Juárez are all Nájera's biological sons.

His son El Hijo de Fishman was involved in an incident on October 7, 2026, where referee, and former Luchador, El Búho died following a piledriver. He was Initially charged with manslaughter. Following an agreement with the family, he was released two days later.

== Professional wrestling career ==
Nájera began training at the Juárez municipal gym at a young age, training alongside Miguel Ángel Delgado (who would later be known as El Cobarde), Francisco Javier Delgado (later on El Impostor and El Cobarde II) and Jesus Aguilar (the future El Marquez), with the four becoming good friends. His in-ring debut came as a bit of a surprise, as he was asked by the local Juárez wrestling promoter to fill in when one of the scheduled wrestlers failed to show up for that night's show. Wearing what was described as "underwear and old boots" (in reality sports shorts and a pair of borrowed boots) Nájera wrestled under the ring name "Goliath Reyes" and lost the match. He continued his training for several months before he began working as a full-time luchador. Instead of working as Goliath Reyes he created the masked character "Titán", complete with a colorful jacket that his mother helped him create.

After working as Titán for about a year Nájera was inspired by an off-hand comment from a tag team partner that the eyes on his mask looked like a fish. Taking that comment and pairing it with the popularity of superheroes such as Batman and Superman he came up with the character "Fishman". He designed a gold-and-black-colored mask with a design that was inspired by the shape of a manta ray wrapped around his face. After making a name for himself in Juárez as Fishman Nájera was called on by Empresa Mexicana de Lucha Libre (EMLL), Mexico's largest wrestling promotion, and began working regularly on shows in Mexico City. When he came to Mexico City EMLL officials asked him to change the colors of his mask as the gold and black was too close to the mask of El Solitario, one of EMLL's headline wrestlers. Nájera changed the colors to a bright emerald green base and yellow markings, a color scheme that would later lead him to be dubbed El Veneno Verde ("The Green Poison") by wrestling magazines and fans.

=== Empresa Mexicana de la Lucha Libre (1971–1978) ===
In Mexico City he would stay at the guest house of wrestlers José Luis Mendieta and Jesus Reza, known as Rambo and Mano Negra respectively, as he started to work for EMLL full-time. He made his debut on the same night that El Solitario unmasked Ángel Blanco, working in front of a much larger crowd than he had in Juárez. Fishman's more brutal wrestling style, common in Juárez but not so in Mexico City, almost immediately made him a rudo (wrestlers who portray the "bad guys") with the fans. During his early days he won a couple of low ranking masks, defeating El Médico I, El Monarca and Professor Konak in Luchas de Apuestas, or bet matches, as a way to establish him as a rising star in EMLL. Further promotional support came on October 3, 1973, where EMLL decided he should win the Mexican National Welterweight Championship defeating El Marquez for the championship. On December 5, 1974, he unmasked a wrestler known as the Durango Kid after beating him in a Luchas de Apuestas match. His run as the Mexican National Welterweight Champion lasted over two-and-a-half year before it was vacated on March 5, 1975. Months later Fishman regained the title by defeating Alberto Muñoz in the finals of a tournament to regain the Welterweight Championship. On February 4, 1976, Fishman challenged Ringo Mendoza for the Mexican National Middleweight Championship but was not able to win it, this was rare for the time, both because Fishman was already a champion and that he was clearly identified as a welterweight. On April 23, 1976, in the main event of the 20. Aniversario de Arena México show, Fishman defeated El Faraón in a Luchas de Apuestas match, forcing Faraón to unmask and reveal his real name after the match as per lucha libre traditions. The Apuestas success was followed up by on April 9 when he defeated Blue Demon to win the NWA World Welterweight Championship, one of the top ranked championships in EMLL. With this win he vacated the Mexican National Welterweight Championship to allow him to focus on the NWA World title. On November 19, 1976, Fishman lost the title to Mano Negra as a part of a long running storyline between the two that had begun over the summer. In early 1977 he defeated Blue Demon to become a three time Mexican National Welterweight Champion. At this time he became involved in a three-way storyline against two other hated rudo characters El Cobarde and Sangre Chicana. The three-way storyline was the driving force behind both the first 44th Anniversary Show and the second 44th Anniversary Shows held in September 1977. On the first show, on September 23, the three men competed in a three-way Luchas de Apuestas match, in which El Cobarde was able to pin Fishman to escape from the match with his mask. In the end Fishman pinned Sangre Chicana, forcing him to unmask at the end of the show. The following week El Cobarde caused Fishman to lose the Mexican National Weltweight Championship to Kung Fu, leading to the two facing off for their masks the following day. On September 27 Fishman defeated his longtime back stage friend El Cobarde, forcing him to unmask, giving Fishman two major mask wins within a week of each other.

=== Universal Wrestling Association (1978–1992) ===
In 1978 Fishman was one of many EMLL wrestlers who left the company and joined the recently formed Universal Wrestling Association (UWA), founded by former EMLL promoter Francisco Flores and wrestler-turned-promoter Ray Mendoza. The UWA employed a hard-hitting style of wrestling that EMLL did not emphasize, responding to the demands of the younger lucha libre audiences.

On October 26, 1980, Fishman unsuccessfully challenged one of UWA's top tecnicos El Solitario for the UWA World Junior Heavyweight Championship but was unable to defeat El Solitario. UWA also enabled Fishman to travel to Japan to work for New Japan Pro-Wrestling (NJPW) in 1981 through their partnership agreement. On December 12, 1980, Fishman defeated Perro Aguayo to win the UWA World Light Heavyweight Championship, holding it until March 1, 1981, where he lost it to Villano III. Later that same year he would win another championship from Perro Aguayo, winning the WWF World Light Heavyweight Championship. (Note: The UWA was allowed by the World Wrestling Federation (WWF) to promote the title but all reigns prior to 1997 are not officially recognized by the WWE.) His first reign with that particular championship only lasted two weeks before Aguayo regained it. On July 19, 1981/ Fishman became a two time UWF World Lightweight Champion. In 1982 he appeared on several EMLL shows due to a working agreement between the UWA and EMLL. One such appearance saw Fishman the UWA World Light Heavyweight Championship against Ringo Mendoza. A few months later Sangre Chicana won the UWA Light Heavyweight championship from Fishman. On February 27, 1982, Fishman regained the UWA World Lightweight Championship, making him a three-time champion. On June 11, 1983, Fishman unsuccessfully challenged Japanese Tiger Mask for the WWF Junior Heavyweight Championship in the semi-final of UWA's Tercera Confrontacion Mexico - Japan show that drew approximately 30,000 spectators.

The UWA had working relationships with promotions all over the world, which allowed Fishman to tour Central America and also worked select shows for the Texas-based World Class Championship Wrestling, including an appearance at WCCW's June 1983 "Star Wars" event, where Fishman, Bill Irwin and the Mongol lost to WCCW regulars José Lothario, Chris Adams and Chavo Guerrero. On April 1, 1984, Fishman defeated Villano III in the finals of a tourmane to win his fourth UWA World Light Heavyweight Championship, the most of any wrestler while the UWA was around. (Note: After the UWA closed the championships were still active, being defended in various companies while not being an official championship. During the "unofficial" period El Zorro won the title five times.) On April 1, 1984, in Naucalpan, Mexico Fishman defeated Villano III in a tournament final to win his fourth UWA World Light Heavyweight Championship. In 1984 Fishman and fellow rudo Babe Face travelled to Japan to participate in All Japan Pro Wrestling (AJPW)'s Real World Junior Tag League. The team ended up with 0 points, losing to team such as Gran Hamada and Mighty Inoue, Chavo and Hector Guerrero, Atsushi Onita and Masanobu Fuchi, Magic Dragon and Ultra Seven. Back in Mexico Fishman began to team regularly with former rival Perro Aguayo, forming a team known as Los Compadres del Diablo ("The Devil's Companions"), a team that would later include El Canek as well. Fishman, Aguayo and El Faraón teamed up for Copa Ovaciones y Costalazos ("Cheers and Slams Cup") held by the UWA in 1984. The trio defeated Dos Caras, El Canek and Enrique Vera in the first round, Los Villanos (Villano I, Villano III and Villano V) in the semi-finals and then finally defeated Los Infernales (El Satánico, MS-1 and Pirata Morgan) to win the whole tournament.

In April 1986 Fishman was wrestling against El Solitario, during said match El Solitario reinjured himself and had to be taken to the hospital straight from the arena after the match. El Solitario, real name Roberto González Cruz, complained of abdominal pain and ended up needing surgery to stop an internal bleeding. The surgery was unsuccessful as González died while on the operating table. After the death of González some lucha libre magazine actually published stories that Fishman was responsible for González' death when in fact it had nothing to do with the match with Fishman but a condition González suffered from before he got in the ring for the match. Only days after the death of González it was decided to end Fishman's UWA World Light Heavyweight Championship run, partially to allow Fishman to take some time off from the public. Once the coroner verified that the match against Fishman itself did not cause the death of González Fishman returned to the ring, winning his second WWF World Light Heavyweight Championship from Villano III. On September 19, 1986, he successfully defended the championship against Pirata Morgan as part of the EMLL 53rd Anniversary Show. His regin ended on December 24, 1986, when he lost the championship to former partner Perro Aguayo. With Aguayo turning tecnico in 1986 Los Compadres del Diablo was renamed Los Asesinos del Ring and the two would later add the Killer to the trio. On January 29, 1989, Fishman, Kahoz, Zandokan and Rambo lost to Gran Hamada, Perro Aguayo, Dos Caras and Villaño III on the under card of the UWA 14th Anniversary Show.

=== World Wrestling Association (1988–1990) ===
In 1988 Fishman began splitting his time between the UWA and the World Wrestling Association (WWA) based out of Tijuana, Baja California. While working for the WWA he became involved in a long running storyline feud with one of WWA's main tecnico wrestlers, Rey Misterio. The stoyline saw Fishman unmask Rey Misterio on March 25, 1988, when he won a Luchas de Apuestas match. On March 11, 1989, Rey Misterio defeated Fishman in the finals of a tournament to become the first ever WWA World Junior Light Heavyweight Champion. Fishman became the second ever WWA World Junior Light Heavyweight Champion as he defeated Rey Misterio on May 18, 1990, holding it for 113 days before losing it to Villano IV.

=== Lucha Libre AAA World Wide (1992–1997) ===
With the UWA fading away by the early 1990s Fishman began working full-time for Asistencia Asesoría y Administración, later known simply as AAA, around 1992, shortly after AAA's creation. He wrestled on one of AAA's major annual shows, Triplemania II-A, teaming with Blue Panther and La Parka, losing to the team of Tiger Mask III, Konnan and Máscara Sagrada A few weeks later Fishman was part of Triplemania II-C as well, this time teaming with Fuerza Guerrera and Pirata Morgan, losing to El Torero, Rey Misterio, and Rey Misterio Jr. when Rey Misterio Jr. pinned Fuerza Guerrera. The following year gave him his first major victory in AAA when he, Cien Caras, Máscara Año 2000 and Jerry Estrada defeated Konnan, Perro Aguayo, Latin Lover and Máscara Sagrada. He also worked the 1996 Triplemanía IV-C, teaming with Jerry Estrada, Villano IV and May Flowers only to lose to La Parka, Winners, Super Caló and El Mexicano In the fall of 1998 he teamed up with Angel Blanco, Jr. Cien Caras and El Halcon to participate in a tournament to determine the first Mexican National Atómicos Championship, defeating the team of Blue Demon Jr., Latin Lover, Mascara Sagrada and Super Calo in the first round. In the second round they lost to eventual tournament winners Pierroth Jr. and Los Villanos (III, IV and V). With age Fishman was not as fast in the ring and the brawling style of wrestling that previously made him a draw did not excite the fans of the 1990s as they were looking for more a high pace, high flying style like that of AAA's younger wrestlers.

=== Consejo Mundial de Lucha Libre (1998–1999) ===
Fishman returned to EMLL, now renamed Consejo Mundial de Lucha Libre (CMLL), in 1998 billed as "legend" by CMLL. He participated in the 1998 Ruleta de la Muerte ("Roulette of Death") tournament where tag teams compete in a one night tournament, only in this case the losing team would advance in the tournament and if the team lost the final they would be forced to face each other with their masks on the line. Fishman and Lizmark teamed up for the tournament to defeat El Hijo del Santo and Guerrero del Futuro in the opening round. Hijo del Santo would go on to unmask Guerrero del Futuro in the main event. On March 19, 1999, CMLL held their annual Homenaje a Dos Leyendas: El Santo y Salvador Lutteroth ("Homage to Two Legends" El Santo and Salvador Lutteroth") show. The focal point of the show as the "Salvador Lutteroth Memorial tag team tournament". Fishman teamed up with fellow former UWA main eventer Villano III, but lost to Mr. Niebla and Shocker in the opening round. CMLL held another Ruleta de la Muerte tournament. For this tournament Fishman teamed with La Parka and lost in the first round to Mr. Niebla and Tinieblas Jr., but in the second round were able to defeat eventual tournament losers Shocker and Rey Bucanero.

=== Later career(1999–2012) ===
In 1999 Fishman left CMLL, working a reduced schedule on the Mexican independent circuit instead. At some point after leaving CMLL he won his final mask, defeating Cina de Oro in his home town of Juárez. On December 25, 1999, Fishman, Lizmark, Villano III and Super Astro competed in a four-way elimination match, called a Relevos Suicidas where the first two wrestlers pinned would be forced to fight each other under Luchas de Apuestas rules. On the night both Fishman and Lizmark were able escape the match while Villano III defeated Super Astro to unmask him. Eight months later Fishman was involved in another Relevos Suicida match, organized by the recently formed Global Wrestling All Stars (GWAS). The four-way match between Fishman, La Parka, Máscara Sagrada and Shu el Guerrero was promoted by a new company, Global Wrestling All-Stars, whose first big show was held in the 20,000 seat Palacio de los Deportes area in Mexico City. The show was taped and supposed to be broadcast on pay-per-view but ended up being shown on regular TV later on. The show did not draw even close to half of the 20,000 capacity, estimates were around 300, partially due to the fact that there was no storylines leading to the main event. During the match the tecnicos La Parka and Máscara Sagrada worked together initially even though there were no actual teams in the match. At one point La Parka attacked Máscara Sagrada, tearing at his mask as he tries to get Sagrada pinned and thu saving his own mask. After the other three took turns attacking Máscara Sagrada they finally pinned him to force him to defend his mask that night. A little later Fishman was pinned as well, which was seen as a surprise as it was expected that Shu El Guerrero would be the one to lose his mask. The subsequent match between Fishman and Máscara Sagrada had the crowd on their feet cheering as Máscara Sagrada's white mask and suit turned crimson with blood, either Sagrada intentionally cut himself to draw blood or it was accidental. In the end Máscara Sagrada defeated Fishman, forcing him to unmask and reveal his real name to everyone in the arena or watching on PPV, José Ángel Nájera Sánchez. During his unmasking he was joined by a young El Hijo del Fishman who helped his father untie his mask and remove it. After the match the promoters informed Fishman that they had not made enough profit from the show to pay him what they had agreed on for the mask loss. The promoters offered to sell their cars to cover the cost, but in the end they offered him a role with the promotion to stop any lawsuits. The following year Máscara Sagrada faced Fishman's older son Fishman Jr. in a Lucha en el Reves where two masked wrestlers face off in a match with their hair, not their masks, on the line. Fishman Jr. gained a measure of revenge by pinning Máscara Sagrada, forcing him to have his hair shaved off after the match.

== Retirement, second-generation and death ==
The Apuestas match would mark Nájera's retirement from lucha libre, although he did make a couple of special appearances in subsequent years, one in 2011 in Japan teaming with Black Tiger and Itoku Hidaka, losing to Original Tiger Mask, The Great Sasuke and Mr. Cacao. He also worked on the "Villano III 40th Anniversary show", teaming with former UWA Headliners Dos Caras, Scorpio Jr. and Villano III to win the main event match over Negro Navarro, Rambo, Sangre Chicana and Villano IV. Following his retirement Nájera helped his youngest son make his pro wrestling debut in 2008 after first introducing the world to El Hijo del Fishman during his final Luchas de Apuestas match. His very last match ever happened on February 2, 2012, when Nájera was 61, as Fishman and Hijo del Fishman defeated long time rival Sangre Chicano and his son Sangre Chicano Jr.

His oldest son originally worked under the ring name "Fishman, Jr.", wearing a green and yellow mask like his father, but in 2007 he changed his name to Black Fish. The oldest son was born out of wedlock and when his other son wanted to use the name Nájera decided to take back the rights to the "Fishman" name to avoid confusion. His oldest son decided to sue for the rights to the name but ended up changing his ring name to Black Fish instead, using a black and silver version of the mask his father made famous. A third son works as El Único de Ciudad Juárez. Hijo del Fishman sometimes teams up with El Canek Jr. to form a team known as Los Nuevos Asesinos del Ring, playing off the past history of the name between Fishman and El Canek, and at times joined by El Hijo del Medico Asesino.

In 2009 Nájera, wearing the Fishman mask, was present at the presentation of the Disney XD channel in Mexico. In 2015 the magazine Calistada did a feature on the Museum of Popular Arts exhibition on Lucha Libre, featuring Fishman on the cover, chosen because he was the favorite wrestler of author Miguel Valverde. Fishman was also present for the press conference held by Calista magazine.

Nájera died on April 8, 2017, of a heart attack. It was noted that Nájera had looked frail in his last public appearances.

== Championships and accomplishments ==
- Empresa Mexicana de la Lucha Libre
  - Mexican National Welterweight Championship (3 times)
  - NWA World Welterweight Championship (1 time)
- Pro Wrestling Illustrated
  - Ranked No. 324 of the 500 top singles wrestlers during the "PWI Years" in 2003
- Universal Wrestling Association
  - UWA World Light Heavyweight Championship (4 times)
  - WWF Light Heavyweight Championship (2 times) (Note: Despite winning the title twice, the reigns are not officially recognized by World Wrestling Entertainment. No reign prior to December 1997 is recognized by WWE.)
  - Copa Ovaciones y Costalazos – with Perro Aguayo and El Faraón
- World Wrestling Association
  - WWA World Junior Light Heavyweight Championship (1 time)

== Luchas de Apuestas record ==
Winner (wager)	Loser (wager)	Location	Event	Date	Notes
Fishman (mask)	Dorrel Dixon (hair)	N/A	Live event	N/A	
Fishman (mask)	Professor Konak (mask)	N/A	Live event	1970	
Fishman (mask)	Yaqui (mask)	N/A	Live event	1971	
Fishman (mask)	El Monarca (mask)	N/A	Live event	1974	
Fishman (mask)	Durango Kid (mask)	Matamoros, Tamaulipas	Live event	December 5, 1974	
Fishman (mask)	El Faraón (mask)	Mexico City	20. Aniversario de Arena México	April 23, 1976	
Fishman (mask)	Sangre Chicana (mask)	Mexico City	EMLL 44th Anniversary Show	September 23, 1977	(Note: Triangle match that also included El Cobarde)
Fishman (mask)	El Cobarde (mask)	Mexico City	EMLL 44th Anniversary Show	September 30, 1977	
Fishman and Aníbal (wrestler) (masks)	César Valentino and Kurisu (hair)	Mexico City	Live event	August 10, 1980	
Fishman (mask)	El Médico I (mask)	Tamaulipas, Mexico	Live event	N/A	
Fishman (mask)	Rey Misterio (mask)	Tijuana, Baja California	Live event	March 25, 1988	
Fishman (mask)	Cinta de Oro (mask)	Ciudad Juarez, Chihuahua	Live event	N/A	
Máscara Sagrada (mask)	Fishman (mask)	Mexico City	GWAS show	August 28, 2000	(Note: Four way match that also included with L.A. Park and Shu El Guerrero.)
