= EMLL 43rd Anniversary Show =

Mexican Professional wrestling show

- Promotion: Empresa Mexicana de Lucha Libre
- Date: September 24, 1976
- City: Mexico City, Mexico
- Venue: Arena México
- Attendance: Unknown

Event chronology
← Previous; 20. Aniversario de Arena México	Next →: 21. Aniversario de Arena México

EMLL Anniversary Show chronology
← Previous; 42nd Anniversary (3)	Next → 44th Anniversary (1)

The EMLL 43rd Anniversary Show (Spanish: 43. Aniversario de EMLL) was a professional wrestling major show event produced by Empresa Mexicana de Lucha Libre (EMLL) that took place on September 24, 1976 in Arena México, Mexico City, Mexico. The event commemorated the 43rd anniversary of EMLL, which would become the oldest professional wrestling promotion in the world. The Anniversary show is EMLL's biggest show of the year, their Super Bowl event. The EMLL Anniversary Show series is the longest-running annual professional wrestling show, starting in 1934.

== Production ==
=== Background ===
The 1976 Anniversary show commemorated the 43rd anniversary of the Mexican professional wrestling company Empresa Mexicana de Lucha Libre (Spanish for "Mexican Wrestling Promotion"; EMLL) holding their first show on September 22, 1933 by promoter and founder Salvador Lutteroth. EMLL was rebranded early in 1992 to become Consejo Mundial de Lucha Libre ("World Wrestling Council"; CMLL) signal their departure from the National Wrestling Alliance. With the sales of the Jim Crockett Promotions to Ted Turner in 1988 EMLL became the oldest, still-operating wrestling promotion in the world. Over the years EMLL/CMLL has on occasion held multiple shows to celebrate their anniversary but since 1977 the company has only held one annual show, which is considered the biggest show of the year, CMLL's equivalent of WWE's WrestleMania or their Super Bowl event. CMLL has held their Anniversary show at Arena México in Mexico City, Mexico since 1956, the year the building was completed, over time Arena México earned the nickname "The Cathedral of Lucha Libre" due to it hosting most of EMLL/CMLL's major events since the building was completed. Traditionally EMLL/CMLL holds their major events on Friday Nights, replacing their regularly scheduled Super Viernes show.

=== Storylines ===
The event featured an undetermined number of professional wrestling matches with different wrestlers involved in pre-existing scripted feuds, plots and storylines. Wrestlers were portrayed as either heels (referred to as rudos in Mexico, those that portray the "bad guys") or faces (técnicos in Mexico, the "good guy" characters) as they followed a series of tension-building events, which culminated in a wrestling match or series of matches. Due to the nature of keeping mainly paper records of wrestling at the time no documentation has been found for some of the matches of the show.

== Event ==
Only two matches have been verified as taking place on the 43rd Anniversary show, with the first of the matches seeing champion El Halcón successfully defend the Mexican National Heavyweight Championship against Gran Markus.

The main event was a Lucha de Apuesta, or "Bet match" where El Faraón ("The Pharaoh") risked his mask against the hair of Perro Aguayo. Aguayo had lost his hair against El Santo in the previous year's anniversary show and the 43rd Anniversary show saw the same outcome as El Faraón pinned Aguayo to force the head shaving.

== Results ==
No.	Results	Stipulations
1	El Halcón (c) defeated Gran Markus	Best two-out-of-three falls match for Mexican National Heavyweight Championship
2	El Faraón defeated Perro Aguayo	Best two-out-of-three falls match Lucha de Apuesta mask vs. hair match
(c) / – the champion(s) heading into the match
