= Sangre Chicana =

Mexican professional wrestler

Personal information
- Born: Andrés Durán Reyes; November 30, 1951 (age 74) Paredón, Coahuila, Mexico
- Children: Sangre Chicana Jr. (son); Sangre Imperial (son); Hijo de Sangre Chicana (son); Lady Chicana (daughter); Lluvia (daughter); La Hiedra (daughter)
- Relatives: Herodes (brother); Águila Solitaria (brother-in-law); Águila Solitaria Jr. (nephew); Herodes Jr. (nephew)

Professional wrestling career
- Ring names: Lemus; Sangre Chicana
- Billed height: 1.75 m (5 ft 9 in)
- Billed weight: 96 kg (212 lb)
- Trained by: Rolando Vera; Yaqui Moy
- Debut: July 1973
- Retired: August 12, 2019

Andrés Durán Reyes (born November 30, 1951) is a retired Mexican professional wrestler best known by his ring name Sangre Chicana (Spanish for "Chicano Blood"). He rose to prominence in a feud with El Cobarde and Fishman that led to a Lucha de Apuesta, mask vs. mask match where Reyes lost his mask.

Reyes is one of the very few wrestlers to work for both Empresa Mexicana de Lucha Libre (EMLL) (now known as Consejo Mundial de Lucha Libre (CMLL)) and Francisco Flores' promotion Toreo Cuatro Caminos Independents. Over the years the Chicana "family" grew, as "Lemus I" debuted in the 1980s using Reyes original mask, followed by "Lemus II" in the 1990s. In 2000, Reyes' sons "Lemus Jr." and "Sangre Chicana Jr." made their professional wrestling debuts followed by Sangre Imperial, Hijo de Sangre Chicana, and daughters Lady Chicana, Lluvia and La Hiedra.

== Professional wrestling career ==
Andrés Reyes made his professional wrestling debut in August 1971, using the ring name "Vampiro Negro", wrestling in Nuevo Laredo against Jhonny Rey. He would later wrestle in 1973 as the masked character Lemus. Less than a year after his debut, he was forced to remove his mask as he lost a Lucha de Apuesta (bet match) to El Canek and had to remove the mask per lucha libre (the professional wrestling style originary from Mexico) traditions. Not long after his mask loss, Reyes began working as the masked character Sangre Chicana, Chicana wore the same mask as he did while wrestling as Lemus; this was possible because he began wrestling outside his home state and at the time information did not travel as fast.

After wrestling under a mask for some years, he finally gained some notoriety as he began a feud with Fishman and El Cobarde. This feud led to another Lucha de Apuesta, this time between all three men, a match that Fishman won, unmasking Sangre Chicana. The loss of the mask was the first step towards Sangre Chicana becoming a headline wrestler as he defeated José Luis Mendieta on November 19, 1977, to win the Mexican National Middleweight Championship, only two months after he was unmasked. He vacated the championship in 1979, but the reason for the vacation is unclear. He held the NWA World Middleweight Championship twice in 1980-1981 defeating Cachorro Mendoza and Tony Salazar to win the title and lost it to Ringo Mendoza on April 3, 1981. In 1982 he briefly held the NWA International Junior Heavyweight Championship for 19 days. In 1982, Chicana jumped to the Universal Wrestling Association (UWA) where he resumed his feud with Fishman, trading the UWA World Light Heavyweight Championship four times in total over a period of 16 months. When he returned to Empresa Mexicana de Lucha Libre he teamed up with Cien Caras, defeating Ringo and Cachorro Mendoza to win the Mexican National Tag Team Championship, a title they would hold until Rayo de Jalisco and Tony Benetto won it from them. Between 1989 and 1990 Sangre Chicana held the UWA promoted WWF Light Heavyweight Championship on two occasions.

When the UWA folded, Chicana worked full-time for Consejo Mundial de Lucha Libre (CMLL; Formerly EMLL) where he teamed with Bestia Salvaje and Emilio Charles, Jr. for a CMLL World Trios Championship reign. In the late 1990s, Sangre Chicana left CMLL and began working for AAA where he defeated Máscara Sagrada II to win the Mexican National Light Heavyweight Championship. His run with the title lasted 715 days, from May 16, 1998, until April 30, 2000 when he lost the belt to Latin Lover. On August 20, 2004, Chicana won the AAA Americas Heavyweight Championship, a title held until he left AAA. While he is still listed as the current championship the title has technically been inactive since Chicana left the promotion. In recent years, Sangre Chicana has worked only select dates on the Mexican independent circuit, often together with his son Sangre Chicana, Jr.

== Championships and accomplishments ==
- AAA
  - AAA Americas Heavyweight Championship (1 time)
  - Mexican National Light Heavyweight Championship (1 time)
- Empresa Mexicana de Lucha Libre / Consejo Mundial de Lucha Libre
  - CMLL World Trios Championship (1 time) - with Bestia Salvaje and Emilio Charles, Jr.
  - Mexican National Middleweight Championship (1 time)
  - Mexican National Tag Team Championship (1 time) - with Cien Caras
  - NWA International Junior Heavyweight Championship (1 time)
  - NWA World Middleweight Championship (2 times) (Note: CMLL was a member of the National Wrestling Alliance until 1990. CMLL retained three NWA-branded championships after leaving the NWA that they promote.)
  - Salvador Lutteroth Trios Tournament – with Bestia Salvaje and Emilio Charles, Jr.
  - Homenaje a Dos Leyendas honoree (2021)
- Universal Wrestling Association
  - UWA World Light Heavyweight Championship (2 times)
  - WWF Light Heavyweight Championship (2 times) (Note: Sangre Chicana won the WWF title during a time that it was promoted by the UWA and exclusively in Mexico. The title reigns are not officially recognized by World Wrestling Entertainment. No reign with the championship prior to December 1997 is officially recognized or acknowledged by the World Wrestling Entertainment.)

== Luchas de Apuestas record ==
Winner (wager)	Loser (wager)	Location	Event	Date	Notes
El Canek (mask)	Lemús (mask)	Monterrey, Nuevo León	Live event	1974	
Sangre Chicana (mask)	El Puma (mask)	N/A	Live event	N/A	
Sangre Chicana (mask)	Dragón de Oro (mask)	N/A	Live event	N/A	
Sangre Chicana (mask)	Dragón Rojo (mask)	N/A	Live event	N/A	
Fishman (mask)	Sangre Chicana (mask)	Mexico City	EMLL 44th Anniversary Show	September 23, 1977	(Note: This was a triangle match that also included El Cobarde.)
Sangre Chicana (hair)	El Cobarde	N/A	Live event	N/A	
Sangre Chicana (hair) and As Charro (mask)	Los Tigres del Ring (masks)	Live event	Torreón, Coahuila	January 16, 1977	
El Faraón and Ringo Mendoza (hair)	Sangre Chicana and Alfonso Dantés (hair)	Mexico City	22. Aniversario de Arena México	April 22, 1978	
Sangre Chicana and Adorable Rubí (hair)	El Cobarde and Dragón Rojo (hair)	Mexico City	EMLL 45th Anniversary Show	September 1978	
Sangre Chicana (hair)	Gran Cochisse (hair)	Mexico City	Live event	October 19, 1979	
El Faraón and Águila India (hair)	Sangre Chicana and Tony Salazar (hair)	Mexico City	Live event	1980	
Sangre Chicana and El Satánico (hair)	Ringo and Cachorro Mendoza (hair)	N/A	Live event	May 1982	
El Satánico (hair)	Sangre Chicana (hair)	Mexico City	Live event	July 2, 1982	
Draw	Sangre Chicana (hair); El Satánico (hair)	Mexico City	Live event	December 10, 1982	(Note: Wrestled to a draw where both wrestlers lost had their hair shaved off after the match.)
Sangre Chicana (hair)	MS-1 (hair)	Mexico City	EMLL 50th Anniversary Show	September 23, 1983	
Sangre Chicana (hair)	El Increíble Hulk (mask)	N/A	Live event	March 22, 1984	
Sangre Chicana (hair)	MS-1 (hair)	Mexico City	EMLL 51st Anniversary Show	September 21, 1984	
Sangre Chicana (hair)	Perro Aguayo (hair)	Mexico City	Live event	February 28, 1986	
Sangre Chicana (hair)	El Faraón (hair)	Mexico City	Live event	March 7, 1986	
Sangre Chicana (hair)	Ultraman (mask)	N/A	Live event	1987	
Sangre Chicana (hair)	Apolo Estrada (hair)	Monterrey, Nuevo León	Live event	February 1987	
Perro Aguayo (hair)	Sangre Chicana (hair)	Mexico City	Live event	February 15, 1987	
Sangre Chicana (hair)	La Fiera (hair)	Mexico City	Live event	November 1987	
Perro Aguayo (hair)	Sangre Chicana (hair)	Monterrey, Nuevo León	Live event	December 20, 1987	
Sangre Chicana (hair)	Magnifico (hair)	Mexico City	Live event	1988	
Perro Aguayo (hair)	Sangre Chicana (hair)	Tijuana, Baja California	Live event	January 27, 1989	
Perro Aguayo (hair)	Sangre Chicana (hair)	Mexico City	Live event	November 1990	
Sangre Chicana (hair)	Brazo de Oro (hair)	Mexico City	Live event	June 19, 1992	
Sangre Chicana and El Sanguinario (hair)	Latin Lover and Polimero Espacial (masks)	Monterrey, Nuevo León	Live event	August 1, 1992	
Vampiro Canadiense (hair)	Sangre Chicana (hair)	Monterrey, Nuevo León	Live event	December 10, 1992	
La Fiera (hair)	Sangre Chicana (hair)	Mexico City	Live event	July 2, 1993	
Justiciero (hair)	Sangre Chicana (hair)	Nuevo Laredo, Tamaulipas	Live event	1994	
Sangre Chicana (hair)	La Fiera (hair)	Mexico City	Live event	March 17, 1995	
Heavy Metal (hair)	Sangre Chicana (hair)	Naucalpan, Mexico State	Rey de Reyes	March 1, 1998	
Sangre Chicana (hair)	Enrique Vera (hair)	Nuevo Laredo, Tamaulipas	Live event	October 31, 1999	
Sangre Chicana (hair)	El Cobarde II (hair)	Nuevo Laredo, Tamaulipas	Live event	August 6, 2000	
Sangre Chicana (hair)	Pirata Morgan (hair)	Monterrey, Nuevo León	Live event	September 3, 2000	
Sangre Chicana (hair)	Pirata Morgan (hair)	Acapulco, Guerrero	Triplemanía IX	May 24, 2001	(Note: This was a triangle Bull Terrier match that also included El Cobarde.)
Sangre Chicana (hair)	Jaque Mate (hair)	Nuevo Laredo, Tamaulipas	Live event	February 2002	
Heavy Metal	Sangre Chicana (hair)	Monterrey, Nuevo León	Triplemanía X	July 5, 2002	(Note: As a result of a pre-match stipulation referee El Tirantes had his head shaved instead of Sangre Chicana. Also in the match; El Oriental, Electroshock, El Brazo and May Flowers, each representing an AAA referee.)
Sergio Romo Jr. (hair)	Sangre Chicana (hair)	Monterrey, Nuevo León	Live event	July 31, 2005	(Note: As a result of a pre-match stipulation referee Copetas Salazar had his head shaved instead of Sangre Chicana.)
Sangre Chicana (hair)	Sergio Romo Jr. (hair)	Monterrey, Nuevo León	Live event	October 23, 2005	(Note: This was a triangle match that also included Pirata Morgan.)
Shocker (hair)	Sangre Chicana (hair)	Guadalajara, Jalisco	Guerra de Titanes	December 10, 2005	
Tinieblas, Jr. (mask)	Sangre Chicana (hair)	Tijuana, Baja California	Live event	June 22, 2007	(Note: Final two men in a six man match that also included Tinieblas, Fuerza Guerrera, Pirata Morgan, Espectro Jr.)
Laredo Kid (mask)	Sangre Chicana (hair)	Nuevo Laredo, Tamaulipas	Live event	June 9, 2008	(Note: This was a Cage match that also included Hombre Sin Miedo, Ozz, Cuervo, and Escoria. Laredo Kid was injured before the end of the match and Sangre Chicana sacrificed his hair to save Laredo's mask.)
El Satánico (hair)	Sangre Chicana (hair)	Tamaulipas, Nuevo Laredo	Homenaje y Despedia El Amo del Escandalo	August 12, 2019	
