= Cobarde =

Mexican wrestler (1947–1983)

Miguel Ángel Delgado
- Miguel Ángel Delgado Reyes as he appeared while wrestling

Personal information
- Born: Miguel Ángel Delgado Reyes; August 28, 1947 Ciudad Juárez, Mexico
- Died: February 7, 1983 (aged 35) Ciudad Juárez, Mexico

Professional wrestling career
- Ring name: El Cobarde
- Billed height: 1.76 m (5 ft 9 1/2 in)
- Billed weight: 92 kg (203 lb)
- Trained by: Doctor X (Note: Not to be confused with Doctor X); Gorilla Ramos
- Debut: November 1966

Miguel Ángel Delgado Reyes (August 28, 1947 – February 7, 1983) was a Mexican professional wrestler that wrestled under the ring name El Cobarde (Spanish for "The Coward"). Delgado was born and died in Ciudad Juarez.

== Personal life ==
Miguel Ángel Delgado was a second-generation wrestler, son of the original Dr. X and the brother of wrestlers "Impostor" (later known as El Cobarde II) and "Legendario" He was the uncle of wrestlers Hijo del Cobarde, El Cobarde, Jr. and Impostor, Jr (now the current El Cobarde).

== Professional wrestling career ==
El Cobarde was one of the first Mexican professional wrestler to travel and perform in Japan where he would compete in a number of matches, including unsuccessfully challenging for the NWA World Heavyweight Championship. He lost his mask in a Luchas de Apuestas ("Bet match") against his lifelong friend Fishman who he had originally trained at the start of Fishman's career. After the loss of his mask he remained with Empresa Mexicana de Lucha Libre (EMLL), turning from rudo (people who portray the bad guy characters in wrestling) to a tecnico ("Good guy") and receiving standing ovations from crowds across Mexico, but especially in Ciudad Juarez, having become a "national idol".

== Death and legacy ==
After losing his mask, Delgado struggled to stay in a prominent position, he eventually left the scene after learning he had Leukemia. He died on February 7, 1983, from the disease.

After his death, his brother Francisco (who had wrestled as El Impostor up until this point) took over the El Cobarde ring persona and mask, becoming "El Cobarde (II)". The Cobarde II character spawned two different wrestlers working under the ring name "El Cobarde, Jr."; one was a third brother of both El Cobardes (I and II) - formerly known under the ring-names "Convoy" & "Legendario" - while the other was the son of El Cobarde II, who also wrestled under the name Hijo del Cobarde ("Son of El Cobarde").

Francisco/Impostor/Cobarde (II) had a second son who wrestled as "Impostor Jr.", who in turn had 5 children who entered wrestling, one of whom - Hijo del Impostor - would in turn be rechristened as simply "El Cobarde" in the 2020s and join CMLL.

== Championships and accomplishments ==
- Universal Wrestling Association
  - UWA World Light Heavyweight Championship (1 time)
- Other championships
  - Northern Mexico Middleweight Championship (1 time)
  - Northern Mexico Tag Team Championship (1 time) – with Golden Boy

== Luchas de Apuestas record ==
Winner (wager)	Loser (wager)	Location	Event	Date	Notes
El Cobarde (mask)	TNT (hair)	N/A	Live event	N/A	
El Cobarde (mask)	César Sando, Jr. (hair)	N/A	Live event	N/A	
El Cobarde (mask)	Carlos Plata (hair)	N/A	Live event	N/A	
El Cobarde (mask)	Espectro II (hair)	N/A	Live event	N/A	
El Cobarde (mask)	Tug Wilson (hair)	N/A	Live event	N/A	
El Cobarde (mask)	Herodes (hair)	N/A	Live event	N/A	
El Cobarde (mask)	El Nazi (hair)	N/A	Live event	N/A	
El Cobarde (mask)	Oro Negro (mask)	Mexico City	Live event	September 2, 1975	
Sangre Chicana (hair)	El Cobarde (hair)	Mexico City	Live event	September 23, 1977	(Note: The match also included Fishman.)
Fishman (mask)	El Cobarde (mask)	Mexico City	EMLL 44th Anniversary Show	September 30, 1977	
TNT and El Cobarde (hair)	Herodes and Carlos Plata (hair)	Mexico City	Live event	June 8, 1978	
Sangre Chicana (hair) and Adorable Rubí (hair)	El Cobarde (hair) and Dragon Rojo (mask)	Mexico City	EMLL 45th Anniversary Show	June 8, 1978	
Sangre Chicana (hair) and Alfonso Dantés (hair)	El Cobarde (hair) and El Jalisco I (mask)	Mexico City	Live event	December 5, 1980	
