= EMLL 44th Anniversary Show (2) =

Mexican Professional wrestling show

EMLL 44th Anniversary Show #2
- Promotion: Empresa Mexicana de Lucha Libre
- Date: September 30, 1977
- City: Mexico City, Mexico
- Venue: Arena México
- Attendance: Unknown

Event chronology
← Previous; EMLL 44th Anniversary Show (1)	Next →: 21. Aniversario de Arena México

EMLL Anniversary Show chronology
← Previous; 44th Anniversary (1)	Next → 45th Anniversary

Mexican professional wrestling promotion Empresa Mexicana de Lucha Libre (EMLL) celebrated their 44th anniversary with two professional wrestling major shows centering on the anniversary date in mid to late September. The second EMLL 44th Anniversary Show (Spanish: 44. Aniversario de EMLL) took place on September 30, 1977, in Arena México, Mexico City, Mexico to commemorate the anniversary of EMLL, which over time became the oldest professional wrestling promotion in the world. The Anniversary show is EMLL's biggest show of the year. The EMLL Anniversary Show series is the longest-running annual professional wrestling show, starting in 1934.

== Production ==
=== Background ===
The 1977 Anniversary show commemorated the 44th anniversary of the Mexican professional wrestling company Empresa Mexicana de Lucha Libre (Spanish for "Mexican Wrestling Promotion"; EMLL) holding their first show on September 22, 1933, by promoter and founder Salvador Lutteroth. EMLL was rebranded early in 1992 to become Consejo Mundial de Lucha Libre ("World Wrestling Council"; CMLL) signal their departure from the National Wrestling Alliance. With the sales of the Jim Crockett Promotions to Ted Turner in 1988 EMLL became the oldest, still-operating wrestling promotion in the world. Over the years EMLL/CMLL has on occasion held multiple shows to celebrate their anniversary with 1977 being the last year where EMLL held multiple anniversary shows, which is considered the biggest show(s) of the year, CMLL's equivalent of WWE's WrestleMania or their Super Bowl event. CMLL has held their Anniversary show at Arena México in Mexico City, Mexico since 1956, the year the building was completed, over time Arena México earned the nickname "The Cathedral of Lucha Libre" due to it hosting most of EMLL/CMLL's major events since the building was completed. Traditionally EMLL/CMLL holds their major events on Friday Nights, replacing their regularly scheduled Super Viernes show.

=== Storylines ===
The event featured at least two professional wrestling matches with different wrestlers involved in pre-existing scripted feuds, plots and storylines. Wrestlers were portrayed as either heels (referred to as rudos in Mexico, those that portray the "bad guys") or faces (técnicos in Mexico, the "good guy" characters) as they followed a series of tension-building events, which culminated in a wrestling match or series of matches. Due to the nature of keeping mainly paper records of wrestling at the time no documentation has been found for some of the matches of the show.

== Event ==
The main event of the second 44th Anniversary show was a direct result of the main event of the first 44th Anniversary Show, where El Cobarde ("The Coward") had turned on his longtime friend Fishman to ensure he did not have to unmask. On the second anniversary show Fishman and El Cobarde faced off in a best two-out-of-three falls Lucha de Apuesta mask vs. mask match, the most prestigious match in Lucha Libre. Fishman managed to get revenge for the betrayal of El Cobarde, pinning him to win his second major mask in a week. El Cobarde was forced to remove his black and white mask and state his birth name, Miguel Ángel Delgado Reyes.

== Results ==
No.	Results	Stipulations
1	Fishman defeated El Cobarde	Best two-out-of-three falls Lucha de Apuesta mask vs. mask match
