= El Faraón =

Mexican professional wrestler

Personal information
- Born: José Luis Barajas Fernández; October 5, 1947 (age 78) Mexico City, Mexico

Professional wrestling career
- Ring name: El Faraón
- Billed height: 1.80 m (5 ft 11 in)
- Billed weight: 89 kg (196 lb)
- Trained by: Diablo Velazco; Antonio Cruz
- Debut: June 19, 1973

José Luis Barajas Fernández is a retired Mexican professional wrestler. Barajas is best known under the ring name, El Faraón (Spanish for "the Pharaoh"), a ring name and persona he used throughout his career from his debut in 1973 until retiring around the turn of the millennium. El Fareón was originally an masked wrestler but lost a Luchas de Apuestas, or "bet match" to Fishman on April 23, 1973 and was forced to unmask. Barajas' career peak came in the 1980s where he won the NWA World Middleweight Championship, NWA World Light Heavyweight Championship and the Mexican National Middleweight Championship, in addition to a long-running, intense storyline feud against Sangre Chicana that saw the two face off in a series of very bloody matches.

== Professional wrestling career ==
José Luis Barajas Fernández made his professional wrestling debut in 1973, adopting the ring name El Faraón, an Egyptian inspired ring character complete with a mask, cape and wrestling trunks that reflected the imagery of Egyptian Pharaohs. Barajas only worked as an masked wrestler for just under three years as he was unmasked after losing a Luchas de Apuestas ("Bet match") against Fishman on April 23, 1976. The unmasking did not hurt El Faraón's career, on the contrary he achieved more success after he was unmasked due to his good looks and charisma, he also earned the nickname "El Rudo de los Ojos Esmeralda", Spanish for "The Bad Guy with the Emerald Eyes". On October 22, 1976 El Faraón defeated Perro Aguayo to win the NWA World Middleweight Championship. Faraón's first title defense lasted for 140 days before Perro Aguayo regained the title on March 11, 1977. In November, 1977 Faraón regained the NWA Middleweight title, defeating Joe Plardy. Faraón's second title reign lasted only 84 days before he lost the belt to Ringo Mendoza on February 17, 1978. By June 1978 El Faraón had moved up from the middleweight division (a division with a weightlimit of 87 kg (192 lb)) to the light heavyweight division (which has a 97 kg (214 lb) maximum limit) as he defeated Alfonso Dantés for the NWA World Light Heavyweight Championship. El Faraón held the title for 198 days before losing it to Pak Choo. On December 5, 1980 El Faraón defeated Ringo Mendoza to win the Mexican National Middleweight Championship, holding it for over 100 days before vacating it in April, 1981. The reason why El Faraón vacated the title is not known, the most likely reason is that he was injured. On November 29, 1981 El Faraón defeated Ringo Mendoza to become a three time NWA World Middleweight Champion, a title he would hold for 124 days before being defeated by César Curiel on April 2, 1982. On November 16, 1982 El Faraón defeated Máscara Año 2000 for his second NWA World Light Heavyweight Championship, a title that would be his last major wrestling title. Faraón held the title for 60 days before losing the belt to Ringo Mendoza on January 15, 1983. After 1983 El Faraón's career did not focus on winning championships, instead it centered around a long-running, intense storyline feud against Sangre Chicana that saw the two face off in a series of very bloody matches. The brutal brawls between the two wrestlers drew high attendance figures all over Mexico and continued on and off for several years. By the mid-1990s Barajas retired from wrestling, both due to his age and the toll wrestling had taken on his body. In 2007 Barajas as El Faraón made an appearance for Consejo Mundial de Lucha Libre (CMLL) to present the mask to a wrestler billed as El Hijo del Faraón (the Son of the Pharaoh); the relationship was a storyline relationship as the two are not related. El Hijo del Faraón would later change his name to Horus and reveal that he was the godson of Barajas', not his son and was given the name with the blessing of Barajas himself.

== Championships and accomplishments ==
- Empresa Mexicana de Lucha Libre
  - Mexican National Middleweight Championship (1 time)
  - NWA Intercontinental Heavyweight Championship (1 time)
  - NWA World Light Heavyweight Championship (2 times)
  - NWA World Middleweight Championship (3 times)
  - Homenaje a Dos Leyendas honoree (2015)
- Misc. Mexican promotions
  - Central America Continental Championship (1 time)
  - Occident Middleweight Championship (1 time)

== Luchas de Apuestas record ==
Winner (wager)	Loser (wager)	Location	Event	Date	Notes
Fishman (mask)	El Faraón (mask)	Mexico City	20. Aniversario de Arena México	April 23, 1976	
El Faraón (hair)	Alfonso Dantés (hair)	Mexico City	Live event	1970s	
El Ídolo (hair)	El Faraón (hair)	Guadalajara, Jalisco	Live event	1970s	
Lizmark (mask)	El Faraón (hair)	Acapulco, Guerrero	Live event	1970s	
El Faraón (hair)	Perro Aguayo (hair)	Mexico City	EMLL 43rd Anniversary Show	September 24, 1976	
El Faraón and Ringo Mendoza (hair)	Perro Aguayo and Joe Plardi (hair)	Mexico City	Live event	December 9, 1977	
El Faraón and Ringo Mendoza (hair)	Sangre Chicana and Alfonso Dantés (hair)	Mexico City	22. Aniversario de Arena México	April 22, 1978	
El Faraón and Águila India (hair)	Sangre Chicana and Tony Salazar (hair)	Mexico City	Live event	1970s	
Alfonso Dantés (hair)	El Faraón (hair)	Mexico City	EMLL Live event	April 20, 1979	
El Faraón and Ringo Mendoza (hair)	El Nazi and Adorable Rubí (hair)	Mexico City	24. Aniversario de Arena México	April 7, 1980	
El Faraón and Ringo Mendoza (hair)	Tony Benetto and Herodes (hair)	Mexico City	Live event	June 27, 1980	
El Solitario (mask)	El Faraón (hair)	Guadalajara, Jalisco	Live event	April 6, 1981	
Ringo Mendoza (hair)	El Faraón (hair)	Mexico City	Live event	December 4, 1981	
El Faraón (hair)	La Fiera (hair)	Mexico City	Live event	February 23, 1986	
Sangre Chicana (hair)	El Faraón (hair)	Mexico City	Live event	March 7, 1986	
Perro Aguayo (hair)	El Faraón (hair)	Monterrey, Nuevo León	Live event	October 26, 1986	
El Faraón and Ringo Mendoza (hair)	MS-1 and Masakre (hair)	Mexico City	Live event	September 7, 1990	
El Faraón (hair)	Pirata Morgan (hair)	Mexico City	Live event	November 16, 1990	
El Faraón (hair)	MS-1 (hair)	Mexico City	Live event	July 3, 1992	
