= Perro Aguayo =

Mexican professional wrestler

Personal information
- Born: Pedro Aguayo Damián; 18 January 1946 Nochistlán, Zacatecas, Mexico
- Died: 3 July 2019 (aged 73) Tala, Jalisco, Mexico
- Children: Perro Aguayo Jr. (son)

Professional wrestling career
- Ring name: El Perro Aguayo
- Billed height: 1.78 m (5 ft 10 in)
- Billed weight: 98 kg (216 lb; 15.4 st)
- Trained by: Apolo Romano; Diablo Velasco
- Debut: 1968
- Retired: July 14, 2007

Pedro Aguayo Damián (18 January 1946 – 3 July 2019), better known as "(El) Perro Aguayo" (Aguayo the dog) and El Can de Nochistlan (The Nochistlan Dog), was a Mexican professional wrestler through the 1970s to the 1990s.

Aguayo was the first person crowned the WWF Light Heavyweight Champion, though pre-1997 title reigns are not included in WWE's official history for that title. In 2012, Aguayo was inducted into the AAA Hall of Fame. Aguayo was notably the last major rival of El Santo. Often prone to blading, Aguayo has been described by American pundits as a cross between Terry Funk and Bruno Sammartino (for his willingness to brawl and overpower opponents). One of the biggest box office attractions in lucha libre history, prominent professional wrestling journalist and historian Dave Meltzer described Aguayo as "one of the hardest working and most charismatic wrestlers ever".

Aguayo's son also wrestled as Perro Aguayo Jr. or El Hijo del Perro Aguayo ("The Son of Perro Aguayo").

== Professional wrestling career ==
Aguayo was synonymous with the Universal Wrestling Association (UWA) as one of its top heels and one of the top heels in lucha libre overall. In the 1990s, Aguayo helped found Asistencia Asesoría y Administración, later known simply as AAA, and his three-way feud with Konnan and Cien Caras proved to be one of the most successful programs in terms of box office receipts. He stayed with AAA until 2000, even making an appearance on WWF's Royal Rumble in 1997 in a match that featured lucha libre legends like El Canek, Mil Máscaras and up and comers who would later make names for themselves like Héctor Garza and Heavy Metal. He came to Consejo Mundial de Lucha Libre to feud with Los Capos. He was successful in taking the hair of Cien Caras and Máscara Año 2000 but he lost his slated retirement match against Universo 2000. He remained in retirement until his son began feuding with Los Capos as well. Cien Caras claimed he could not retire until his business with Aguayo was finished so a double hair vs. hair match was set with Perro Aguayo and Perro Aguayo Jr. taking on Cien Caras and Máscara Año 2000. The Aguayos were successful and Perro Aguayo returned to retirement and Cien Caras went into semi-retirement.

On 5 August 2012, at Triplemanía XX, Aguayo was inducted into the AAA Hall of Fame.

== Personal life ==
He was the father of the Los Perros del Mal stable founder Perro Aguayo Jr., who died on 21 March 2015, during a wrestling match at the age of 35. His brother-in-law wrestled as El Ídolo, whilst his nephews are Los Ídolos (I & II) and Pepe Aguayo II.

== Death ==
On 3 July 2019, Aguayo died at the age of 73, his death was announced through a social media post by the "Los Perros del Mal" account. According to them, his death was caused by a heart attack. His funeral was held on 4 July in Guadalajara at a Funeraria Gayosso. On 5 July, a mass was held for Aguayo at the Parque Funeral Colonias de Guadalajara, the same place where in 2015 he farewell his son Perro Aguayo Jr., with the attendance of family, friends and fans before ultimately being cremated.

== Championships and accomplishments ==
- Asistencia Asesoría y Administración

- AAA Campeón de Campeones Championship (1 time)
- IWC World Heavyweight Championship (1 time)
- Mexican National Heavyweight Championship (1 time)
- Mexican National Tag Team Championship (2 times) - with Perro Aguayo Jr.
- Rey de Reyes 1998
- AAA Hall of Fame (Class of 2012)

- Empresa Mexicana de Lucha Libre

- NWA World Middleweight Championship (3 times) (Note: While CMLL is no longer an NWA affiliate, it still uses the NWA initials for this championship. However, the National Wrestling Alliance no longer sanctions or recognizes this championship.)
- Occidente Middleweight Championship (1 time)
- Homenaje a Dos Leyendas honoree (2005)

- New Japan Pro Wrestling

- WWF Light Heavyweight Championship League (1981)

- Universal Wrestling Association

- Mexican National Middleweight Championship (1 time)
- UWA World Heavyweight Championship (1 time)
- UWA World Light Heavyweight Championship (1 time)
- UWA World Junior Light Heavyweight Championship (2 times)
- UWA World Tag Team Championship (1 time) - with Gran Hamada
- WWF Light Heavyweight Championship (7 times) (Note: While he did win the championship 7 times, none of the reigns are recognized by World Wrestling Entertainment. The WWE recognizes no reigns with the title prior to December 1997.)

- World Wrestling Association

- WWA World Heavyweight Championship (3 times)

- World Wrestling Council

- WWC World Junior Heavyweight Championship (1 time)

- World Wrestling Federation

- WWF Intercontinental Tag Team Championship (1 time, inaugural and final) – with Gran Hamada

- Pro Wrestling Illustrated

- PWI ranked him # 38 of the 500 best singles wrestlers during the "PWI Years" in 2003.

- Wrestling Observer Newsletter awards

- Best Babyface (1995)
- Wrestling Observer Newsletter Hall of Fame (Class of 1996)

== Luchas de Apuestas record ==
Winner (wager)	Loser (wager)	Location	Event	Date	Notes
Cucho Villa (hair)	Perro Aguayo (hair)	Oblatos, Jalisco	Live event	1970	
Perro Aguayo (hair)	Luis Mariscal (hair)	Guadalajara, Jalisco	Live event	24 December 1972	
Perro Aguayo (hair)	Guillermo Valle (hair)	Guadalajara, Jalisco	Live event	4 September 1973	
Perro Aguayo (hair)	Karloff Lagarde (hair)	Tijuana, Baja California	Live event	8 June 1974	
Perro Aguayo (hair)	Carlos Mata (hair)	N/A	Live event	15 June 1974	
Perro Aguayo (hair)	Ringo Mendoza (hair)	Mexico City	19. Aniversario de Arena México	24 May 1975	
Perro Aguayo (hair)	Marty Jones (hair)	Mexico City	Super Viernes	13 June 1975	
El Santo (mask)	Perro Aguayo (hair)	Mexico City	EMLL 42nd Anniversary Show	3 October 1975	
Ringo Mendoza (hair)	Perro Aguayo (hair)	Guadalajara, Jalisco	Live event	26 May 1976	
El Faraón (hair)	Perro Aguayo (hair)	Mexico City	EMLL 43rd Anniversary Show	24 September 1976	
El Faraón and Ringo Mendoza (hair)	Perro Aguayo and Joe Polardi (hair)	Mexico City	Live event	9 December 1977	
El Solitario (mask)	Perro Aguayo (hair)	Mexico City	Live event	10 September 1978	
René Guajardo (hair)	Perro Aguayo (hair)	Mexico City	Live event	29 June 1980	
Perro Aguayo (hair)	Tony Salazar (hair)	Mexico City	EMLL 49th Anniversary Show	17 September 1982	
Perro Aguayo (hair)	Negro Navarro (hair)	Tijuana, Baja California	Live event	27 May 1983	
Perro Aguayo (hair)	El Texano (hair)	Tijuana, Baja California	Live event	15 July 1983	
Villano III (mask)	Perro Aguayo (hair)	Naucalpan, Mexico State	Live event	21 August 1983	
Sangre Chicana (hair)	Perro Aguayo (hair)	Mexico City	Live event	28 February 1986	
Perro Aguayo (hair)	El Faraón (hair)	Monterrey, Nuevo León	Live event	26 October 1986	
Perro Aguayo (hair)	Kato Kung Lee (hair)	Los Angeles, California	Live event	December 1986	
Perro Aguayo (hair)	Sangre Chicana (hair)	Mexico City	Live event	15 February 1987	
Perro Aguayo (hair)	Scorpio (hair)	Naucalpan, Mexico State	Live event	30 August 1987	
Perro Aguayo (hair)	Babe Face (hair)	Mexico City	Live event	6 December 1987	
Perro Aguayo (hair)	Sangre Chicana (hair)	Monterrey, Nuevo León	Live event	20 December 1987	
Villano III (mask) and Perro Aguayo (hair)	Black Power I and Black Power II (masks)	Naucalpan, Mexico State	Live event	5 May 1988	
Perro Aguayo (hair)	Gran Markus (hair)	Monterrey, Nuevo León	Live event	April 1988	
Perro Aguayo (hair)	Diablo Rojo (mask)	Villahermosa, Tabasco	Live event	June 1988	
Perro Aguayo (hair)	Ultraman (hair)	Mexico City	Live event	16 July 1988	
Perro Aguayo (hair)	Luis Mariscal (hair)	Guadalajara, Jalisco	Live event	15 January 1989	
Perro Aguayo (hair)	Sangre Chicana (hair)	Tijuana, Baja California	Live event	27 January 1989	
Perro Aguayo (hair)	El Indómito (hair)	Naucalpan, Mexico State	Live event	May 1989	
Perro Aguayo (hair)	Adorable Rubí (hair)	Naucalpan, Mexico State	Live event	May 1989	
Perro Aguayo (hair)	Lobo Rubio (hair)	N/A	Live event	June 1989	
Perro Aguayo (hair)	El Globo Humano (mask)	Naucalpan, Mexico State	Live event	29 July 1990	
Perro Aguayo (hair)	Sangre Chicana (hair)	Mexico City	Live event	November 1990	
Perro Aguayo and Ringo Mendoza (hair)	The Texas Rangers (masks)	Mexico City	Live event	3 March 1991	
Perro Aguayo (hair)	Konnan (mask)	Mexico City	EMLL Live event	22 March 1991	
Perro Aguayo (hair)	Negro Navarro (hair)	Naucalpan, Mexico State	Live event	2 June 1991	
Perro Aguayo (hair)	Coloso Colosetti (hair)	Matamoros, Tamaulipas	Live event	26 June 1991	
Perro Aguayo (hair)	Stuka (mask)	Monterrey, [Nuevo León	Live event	1 August 1991	(Note: This was a triangle match that also included El Hijo del Santo.)
Perro Aguayo (hair)	Stuka (hair)	Monterrey, Nuevo León	Live event	8 August 1991	
Konnan (hair)	Perro Aguayo (hair)	Mexico City	Live event	6 September 1991	(Note: This was a triangle match that also included Cien Caras.)
Perro Aguayo (hair)	Máscara Año 2000 (mask)	Mexico City	Triplemanía I	30 April 1993	
Perro Aguayo (hair)	Nikozuna (hair)	Mexico City	Live event	22 September 1995	(Note: Nikozuna never had any of his hair shaved off after the loss.)
Perro Aguayo (hair)	El Cobarde II (hair)	Naucalpan, Mexico State	Rey de Reyes	7 March 1999	(Note: This was a triangle dog collar match that also included Sangre Chicana.)
Perro Aguayo (hair)	Bestia Salvaje (hair)	Mexico City	44. Aniversario de Arena México	14 April 2000	
Perro Aguayo (hair)	Cien Caras (hair)	Mexico City	Sin Piedad	15 December 2000	
Perro Aguayo (hair)	Máscara Año 2000 (hair)	Tijuana, Baja California	Live event	2 February 2001	
Universo 2000 (mask)	Perro Aguayo (hair)	Mexico City	Juicio Final	30 March 2001	
Perro Aguayo and Perro Aguayo Jr. (hair)	Cien Caras and Máscara Año 2000 (hair)	Mexico City	Homenaje a Dos Leyendas	18 March 2005	
