= 1951 in professional wrestling =

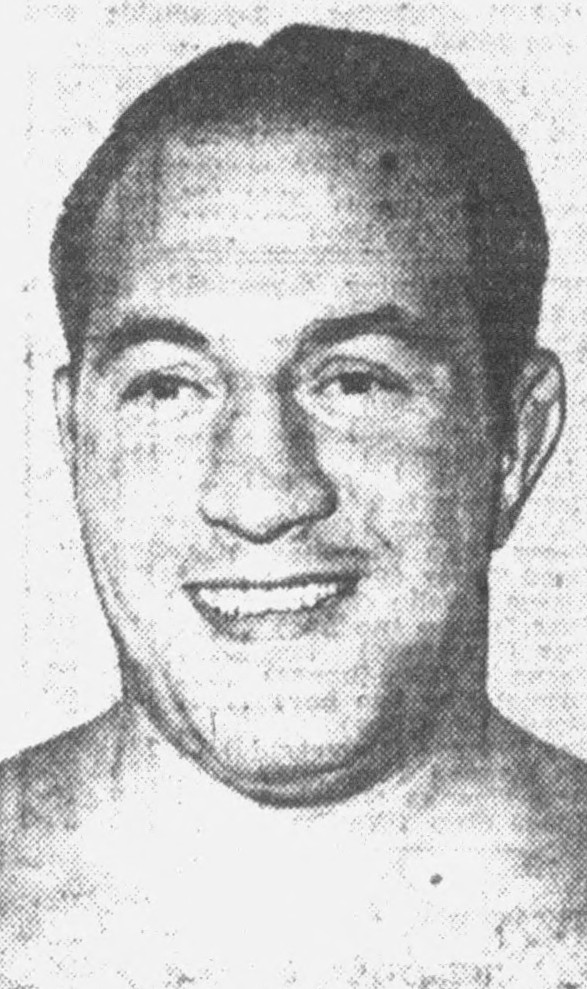
Sam Menacker in 1951

1951 in professional wrestling describes the year's events in the world of professional wrestling.

== List of notable promotions ==
Only one promotion held notable shows in 1951.

Promotion Name	Abbreviation
Empresa Mexicana de Lucha Libre	EMLL

== Calendar of notable shows ==
Date	Promotion(s)	Event	Location	Main event
September 21	EMLL	EMLL 18th Anniversary Show	Mexico City, Mexico	Enrique Llanes defeated Sugi Sito (c) in a best two-out-of three falls match for the NWA World Middleweight Championship
(c) – denotes defending champion(s)

== Championship changes ==
=== EMLL ===
NWA World Middleweight Championship
Incoming champion – Sugi Sito
Date	Winner	Event/Show	Note(s)
September 24	Enrique Llanes	EMLL 18th Anniversary Show	

NWA World Welterweight Championship
Incoming champion – Gory Guerrero
Date	Winner	Event/Show	Note(s)
July 13	Bobby Bonales	EMLL show	

Mexican National Heavyweight Championship
Incoming champion - Daniel Aldana
No title changes

Mexican National Middleweight Championship
Incoming champion – Uncertain
No title changes

Mexican National Lightweight Championship
Incoming champion – Black Shadow
No title changes

Mexican National Light Heavyweight Championship
Incoming champion – Enrique Llanes
Date	Winner	Event/Show	Note(s)
Uncertain	Vacated	N/A	Championship vacated for undocumented reasons

Mexican National Welterweight Championship
Incoming champion – El Santo
No title changes

=== NWA ===
NWA Worlds Heavyweight Championship
Incoming Champion – Lou Thesz
Date	Winner	Event/Show	Note(s)
No title changes

== Debuts ==
- Debut date uncertain:
  - Baron Mikel Scicluna
  - Chris Tolos
  - Don Fargo
  - Espectro I
  - Happy Humphrey
  - Mad Dog Vachon
  - Stan Holek
- April 12 – Bill Miller
- September 13 – Luther Lindsay
- October 1 – Kinji Shibuya
- October 28 – Rikidozan

== Births ==
- Date unknown
  - A. J. Petrucci
- January 6 – Fishman(died in 2017)
- January 10 – Pez Whatley|(died in 2005)
- January 14 – Michael Porter (died in 2010)
- January 15 – Mano Negra
- January 20 – Kung Fu(died in 2001)
- January 23 – Vivian Vachon (died in 1991)
- January 27 – Ken Timbs(died 2004)
- February 20 – Dos Caras
- February 25 – Mr. Pogo(died in 2017)
- March 3 – Bob Della Serra
- March 9 – Norvell Austin
- March 21 – Buck Zumhofe
- March 25 – Jumbo Tsuruta(died in 2000)
- April 3 – Ron Starr(died in 2017)
- April 7 – Virgil (died in 2024)
- April 14 – Willie Williams (died in 2019)
- May 11 – Mark Rocco(died in 2020)
- May 19 – Dick Slater (died in 2018)
- June 13 – Antonio Peña(died in 2006)
- June 16 – Roberto Durán
- June 18 – Salvatore Bellomo(died in 2019)
- June 26
  - Davey O'Hannon
  - Larry Sharpe(died in 2017)
- July 15 – Jesse Ventura
- July 24 – Skip Young(died in 2010)
- August 21 – Keith Hart
- August 25 – Steve Regal (died in 2025)
- September 10:
  - Greg Valentine
  - Steve Keirn
- September 13 – Jerry Stubbs
- September 20 – Mike Graham(died in 2012)
- September 22 – Doug Somers (died in 2017)
- October 7 – Terry Orndorff
- October 14 – Mike Miller
- October 28 – Mike Sharpe(died in 2016)
- November 30 – Sangre Chicana
- December 3:
  - Ray Candy(died in 1994)
  - Riki Choshu
- December 5 – Larry Zbyszko
- December 13 – Ricky Rice
- December 20 – Ari Romero(died in 2013)

== Deaths ==
- July 28 Janet Wolfe (18)
- October 20 Ed Virag (39)
