= 1949 in professional wrestling =

1949 in professional wrestling describes the year's events in the world of professional wrestling.

== List of notable promotions ==
Only one promotion held notable shows in 1949.

Promotion Name	Abbreviation
Empresa Mexicana de Lucha Libre	EMLL

== Calendar of notable shows ==
Date	Promotion(s)	Event	Location	Main Event
September 30	EMLL	EMLL 16th Anniversary Show	Mexico City, Mexico	Tarzán López and Bobby Bonales defeated El Santo and Gory Guerrero in a best two-out-three falls tag team match

== Championship changes ==
=== EMLL ===
NWA World Middleweight Championship
incoming champion – Mike Kelly
Date	Winner	Event/Show	Note(s)
May 28	Tarzán López	EMLL show	

NWA World Welterweight Championship
incoming champion – Jack O'Brien
Date	Winner	Event/Show	Note(s)
April 29	Gory Guerrero	EMLL show	

Mexican National Heavyweight Championship
incoming champion - Firpo Segura
Date	Winner	Event/Show	Note(s)
September 9	Daniel Aldana	EMLL Show	

Mexican National Middleweight Championship
incoming champion – Tarzán López
Date	Winner	Event/Show	Note(s)
May 28	Vacated	N/A	

Mexican National Welterweight Championship
Incoming champion – Black Shadow
No title changes

Mexican National Light Heavyweight Championship
incoming champion – Tarzán López
Date	Winner	Event/Show	Note(s)
July 1	Cavernario Galindo	EMLL show	

Mexican National Welterweight Championship
incoming champion – Vacant or El Santo
No title changes

=== NWA ===
NWA Worlds Heavyweight Championship
Incoming Champion – Orville Brown
Date	Winner	Event/Show	Note(s)
November 27	Lou Thesz	N/A	Thez was awarded the championship when Brown's career ended due to a car accident. The NWA voted to recognize Brown as the Worlds Champion. Defeated Sonny Myers to solidify the claim.

== Debuts ==
- Debut date uncertain:
  - Gloria Barattini
  - Angelo Poffo
  - Bobo Brazil
  - Harold Sakata
  - Ilio DiPaolo
  - Johnny Rougeau
  - Red Bastien
  - Rip Hawk
  - The Sheik
  - Verne Gagne
  - Fritz Von Goering
  - The Baillargeon Brothers
- November – The Crusher

== Retirements ==
- Lofty Blomfield (1932-June 7, 1949)
- Orville Brown (October 1931-November 1949)

== Births ==
- Date of birth uncertain:
  - Johnny Rivera
  - John Garea
- January 2 – Tommy Lane (died in 2022)
- January 7:
  - Chavo Guerrero Sr. (died in 2017)
  - Scott LeDoux (died in 2011)
- January 15 – Tony Salazar
- January 16 – Sir Oliver Humperdink (died in 2011)
- January 17 – Andy Kaufman (died in 1984)
- February 11 – T. John Tibbedeux (died in 2013)
- February 19 – Black Man (died in 2022)
- February 25 – Ric Flair
- March 9 – Charlie Fulton (died in 2016)
- April 7:
  - Steve DiSalvo
  - John Anson (died in 2026)
- April 12 – Mighty Inoue (died in 2024)
- April 26 – Jerry Blackwell (died in 1995)
- April 27 – Yoshiaki Fujiwara
- April 28 – Siva Afi (died in 2026)
- May 14 – Robert Fuller
- May 17:
  - Earl Hebner
  - Dave Hebner (died in 2022)
- May 18 – Sailor White (died in 2005)
- June 17 – Evgeny Artyukhin Sr. (died in 2008)
- June 29 – Stephen Cepello
- August 13 – Jim Brunzell
- August 14 – Bob Backlund
- August 29 – Stan Hansen
- September 5 – El Hijo del Gladiador
- September 10:
  - Don Muraco
  - Gerry Morrow (died in 2025)
- September 19 – Ringo Mendoza
- September 25 – Villano II (died in 1989)
- October 4:
  - Mike Adamle
  - Joe Pedicino (died in 2020)
- October 12 – César Curiel
- October 18 – Cien Caras
- October 26:
  - Austin Idol
  - Kevin Sullivan (died in 2024)
  - El Satánico
  - Troy Graham (died in 2002)
- October 29 – Paul Orndorff (died in 2021)
- November 11 – Mike Jackson
- November 28 – Lee Marshall (died in 2014)
- November 29:
  - Dutch Mantell
  - Jerry Lawler
- November 30 – Mike George

== Deaths ==
- August 8 – Ivan Poddubny, 77
- September 11 – Ray Steele (49)
