= Arena Coliseo =

Arena in Mexico City, Mexico

- The Lagunilla Funnel
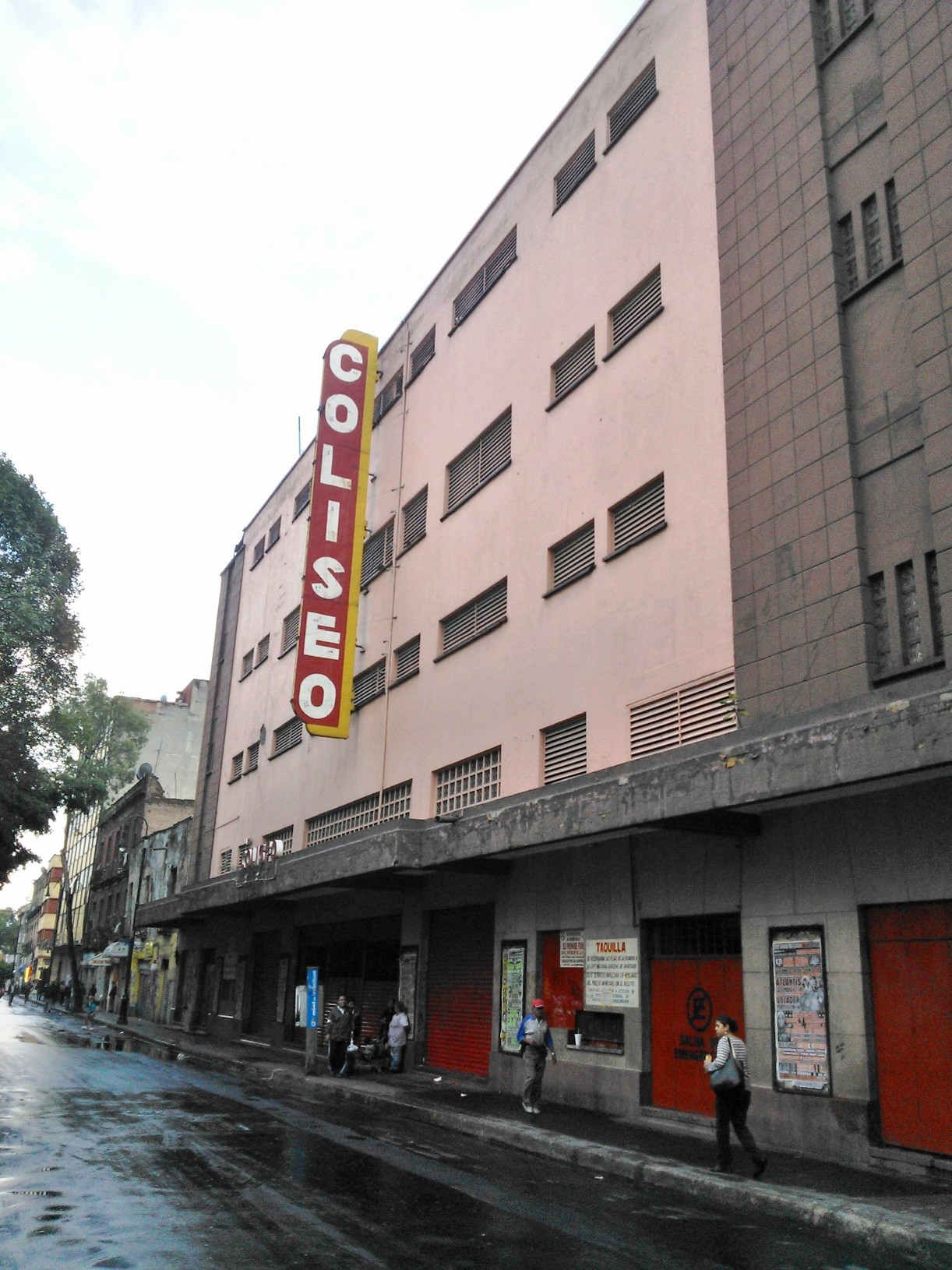
- Arena Coliseo
- Interactive map of Arena Coliseo
- Location: República del Perú 77, Cuauhtémoc, Mexico City, Mexico
- Coordinates: 19°26′22″N 99°8′5″W
- Owner: Consejo Mundial de Lucha Libre (CMLL)
- Capacity: 8,863 (Originally); 5,550 (Currently for Professional wrestling, Boxing)

Construction
- Opened: April 2, 1943

Tenants
- Empresa Mexicana de Lucha Lubre (1943–1989); Consejo Mundial de Lucha Libre (1990–Present)

Arena Coliseo is an indoor arena in Mexico City, Mexico, located at República del Perú 77 in the Cuauhtémoc borough. The arena is primarily used for professional wrestling shows promoted by Consejo Mundial de Lucha Libre (CMLL). The building was completed in 1943, built by Salvador Lutteroth, founder and owner of CMLL and served as the main venue for CMLL from 1943 until 1953 when Arena México was completed and became the main venue for Lutteroth's promotion. It has a seating capacity of 5,550 when configured for professional wrestling or boxing events.

== History ==
Arena Coliseo's ring after a Lucha libre event.

Professional wrestling promoter Salvador Lutteroth began promoting wrestling, or Lucha libre events in Arena Modelo in 1933 as he founded Empresa Mexicana de Lucha Libre (EMLL). The building served as the main venue for Lutteroth's promotion from 1933 until the early 1940s when the success of Lucha Libre meant that Arena Model was becoming too small to accommodate the weekly shows. Lutteroth financed the building of a new arena with $40,000 that he had won in the national lottery. The building would sit on the location of República del Perú 77 in the Cuauhtémoc and was designed by Architect Francisco Bullman. Upon its completion in 1943 it was the first sports building in Mexico to have built in Air Conditioning. The building would hold 8,863 spectators for wrestling or boxing events and quickly gained the nickname the "Lagunilla Funnel" due to the design of the spectators stands in regards to the ring in the middle. The event began hosting Boxing events only a few months after opening and for years would run both wrestling and boxing events throughout the year. The venue served as the main building for EMLL, hosting their Anniversary shows starting with their 10th Anniversary show in 1943 through their 22nd Anniversary show in 1955. From 1956 and forward Arena Coliseo became a secondary venue for EMLL, with the newly constructed Arena México taking over as the venue for all of EMLL's major shows. In 1979, for undisclosed reasons EMLL held their 46th Anniversary Show in Arena Coliseo instead of Arena México, marking the last major EMLL event held there. By the beginning of the 2000s EMLL, now renamed Consejo Mundial de Lucha Libre (CMLL) only held one weekly event, a Sunday Night show. The reduction in use is both as a result of the building's state, lack of parking and the general area being less secure with time due to rise in crime.

== As a boxing venue ==
Arena Coliseo hosted its first boxing event only a month after opening, taking place on May 1, 1943. The event started a tradition of Monday night boxing event at Arena Coliseo that would remain long after Arena Mexico had taken over as CMLL's main venue. The first show was headlined by a fight between Mexican National Bantamweight champion Ernesto Aguilar and Leonardo Lopez. Over the years a number of Mexican and international boxing greats fought at Arena Coliseo, including but not limited to: Jose Medel, Butter Napoles, Vicente Saldivar, Toluco Lopez, Pajarito Moreno, Cuyo Hernandez, El Chango Casanova, Carlos Zarate, Lupe Pintor, Alexis Arguello Alfonso Zamora, Ricardo Lopez, Pipino Cuevas, Kid Azteca and Chiquita Gonzalez. Julio César Chávez fought at Arena Coliseo during his amateur days, but the main attraction of the Arena Coliseo boxing was Raul Macias, with his matches often being shown on the Televisa television channel.

== Deaths on location ==
Over the years Arena Coliseo has witnessed the deaths of several wrestlers and boxers. The first death happened on March 21, 1946, during a boxing match. In the second round of a fight between veteran Guillermo Ramos and young wrestler Fernando Mendoza where Mendoza fell to the floor in the second round and never woke up after the knockout. On December 25, 1979, wrestler José Vincent Ramos Estrada, known to the wrestling world under the ring name Sangre India faced off against César Curiel. Curiel teamed up with El Vengador while Sangre India was teaming with Leo Lopez. During the match Curiel executed a drop kick, a move that was supposed to knock Sangre India out of the ring to the floor. During the fall to the floor, Estrada's head and neck struck the apron before he tumbled uncontrollably to the ground. Estrada died shortly after the fall. The third death to occur in Arena Coliseo was not as a result of a match, but a gunshot. On May 14, 1983 "Uncle" Jimenez, the manager of boxer James Casas was shot dead during Casas' victory celebration. A 100,000 pesos reward was offered at the time but no murderer was ever found. On October 26, 1993, professional wrestler Jesús Javier Hernández Silva, better known under the ring name Oro, teamed up La Fiera and Brazo de Plata to face the team of Kahoz, Dr. Wagner Jr. and Jaque Mate at an Arena Coliseo show. Before the match, while going over the plans for the match Oro said he wanted to take a "Kobashi bump" during the match, a reference to a head first backdrop driver which Kenta Kobashi took in a match in All Japan Pro Wrestling only a few months earlier. That particular bump had a dramatic effect, as it looked like Kobashi had broken his neck from the move and Oro wanted to use the shock effect to help build the drama for their match. During the match, Kahoz clotheslined Oro, who spun and landed on his head as he had planned. His opponent tried to pick him up, but soon thereafter he collapsed and his pulse became weak. Oro was put on a stretcher at the start of the second fall while his brother screamed, "Don't fall asleep!", warning him to remain alert so that he wouldn't lose consciousness. Oro died before being placed in an awaiting ambulance.

== Significant events ==
Over the years Arena Coliseo has hosted a number of significant events, especially a large number of EMLL/CMLL events have taken place in Arena Colise, including a number of CMLL Anniversary shows, shows celebrating the anniversary of Arena Coliseo and shows headlined by major, important matches.

EMLL Anniversary Shows

- EMLL 10th Anniversary Show
- EMLL 11th Anniversary Show
- EMLL 12th Anniversary Show
- EMLL 13th Anniversary Show
- EMLL 14th Anniversary Show
- EMLL 15th Anniversary Show
- EMLL 16th Anniversary Show
- EMLL 17th Anniversary Show
- EMLL 18th Anniversary Show
- EMLL 19th Anniversary Show
- EMLL 20th Anniversary Show
- EMLL 21st Anniversary Show
- EMLL 22nd Anniversary Show
- EMLL 46th Anniversary Show

=== First Show ===
Poster for the first ever Arena Coliseo Show

The first show in Arena Coliseo took place on April 2, 1943, before the show the Archbishop of Mexico, Luis M. Martinez, gave the arena a Catholic blessing. The Mexico City council leader Javier Rojo Gomez was also in attendance for this major event. The show was originally slated to have Bill Longsan from Texas defend a version of the World Heavyweight Championship against Juan Humberto, but Humberto was not able to travel from the United States to Mexico City in time. Instead Lutteroth booked Mexican National Middleweight Champion Tarzán Lopez to defend his championship against Santo, who at the time was already a prominent figure in Lucha Libre, although not the icon he would later become through his lucha films and in-ring exploits.

No.	Results	Stipulations
1	Raúl Romero defeated Sam Carbin	Singles match
2	Chamaco Castro vs. Dientes Hernández ended in an unknown manner	Singles match
3	Bobby Bonales vs. Lobo Negro ended in an unknown manner	Singles match
4	Firpo Segura vs. Gorilla Ramos ended in an unknown manner	Singles match
5	Cowboy Murphy vs. Jack O'Brien ended in an unknown manner	Singles match
6	Bobby Areola vs. Black Guzmán ended in an unknown manner	Singles match
7	Tarzán Lopez (c) defeated El Santo 2–0	Two out of three falls match for the Mexican National Middleweight Championship
(c) / – the champion(s) heading into the match

=== 50th Anniversary Show ===
The then-recently renamed CMLL celebrated the 50th Anniversary of Arena Coliseo with a wrestling show on April 4, 1993, centered around a Ruleta de la Muerte ("Roulette of death") tournament where the loser of each match would advance to the next round and the person who lost the final match would be forced to remove his wrestling mask and reveal his real name per lucha libre traditions.

No.	Results	Stipulations
1	Cynthia Moreno and Xochitl Hamada defeated La Diabólica and La Practicante	Tag team two out of three falls match
2	El Felino defeated Metálico	Ruleta de la Muerte First Round match
3	Scorpio Jr. defeated El Pantera	Ruleta de la Muerte First Round match
4	Titán defeated Máscara Mágica	Ruleta de la Muerte First Round match
5	Lazer Tron defeated Ponzona	Ruleta de la Muerte First Round match
6	Pierroth Jr. defeated Jaque Mate	Ruleta de la Muerte First Round match
7	Kahoz defeated Águila Solitaria	Ruleta de la Muerte First Round match
8	Ulises defeated Rey Barbaro	Ruleta de la Muerte First Round match
9	Mano Negra defeated El Hijo del Solitario	Ruleta de la Muerte First Round match
10	Metálico defeated El Pantera	Ruleta de la Muerte quarter-final match
11	Ponzona defeated Máscara Mágica	Ruleta de la Muerte quarter-final match
12	Jaque Mate defeated Águila Solitaria	Ruleta de la Muerte quarter-final match
13	El Hijo del Solitario defeated Rey Barbaro	Ruleta de la Muerte quarter-final match
14	El Pantera defeated Máscara Mágica	Ruleta de la Muerte semi-final match
15	Águila Solitaria defeated Rey Barbaro	Ruleta de la Muerte semi-final match
16	Máscara Mágica defeated Rey Barbaro	Ruleta de la Muerte final, Lucha de Apuesta, mask vs. mask match

=== 70th Anniversary Show ===
On April 7, 2013, CMLL celebrated the 70th anniversary of Arena Coliseo with a show that featured a number of veteran wrestlers that did not usually work for CMLL such as Negro Navarro, Black Terry, Villano IV, Ray Mendoza Jr., Universo 2000, Máscara Año 2000 and Rayo de Jalisco Jr. Before his match Ray Mendoza Jr. stated that his match in Arena Coliseo would be his last match, after having held a Retirement show a few weeks before. During the show CMLL gave an award to a fan who had also attended the first show 70 years prior.

=== 75. Aniversario de Arena Coliseo ===
75. Aniversario de Arena Coliseo
- Official poster for the event
- Promotion: Consejo Mundial de Lucha Libre
- Date: April 7, 2018
- City: Mexico City, Mexico
- Venue: Arena Coliseo

Event chronology
← Previous; Copa Nuevos Valores	Next →: 62. Aniversario de Arena México

Aniversario de Arena Coliseo chronology
← Previous; 74. Aniversario de Arena Coliseo	Next →: 76. Aniversario de Arena Coliseo

The 75. Aniversario de Arena Coliseo (Spanish for "Arena Coliseo's 75th Anniversary") show was a major professional wrestling show produced by Consejo Mundial de Lucha Libre (CMLL) to commemorate the opening of Arena Coliseo, in 1943. The event took place on April 7, 2018, and featured six matches in total, including a guest appearances from several leyendas who had previously worked for CMLL. The main event saw Atlantis and Blue Panther defeat leyendas Fuerza Guerrera and El Satánico

Results

No.	Results	Stipulations
1	Magnus and Robin defeated Akuma and Príncipe Odín Jr.	Best two-out-of-three falls tag team match
2	La Amapola, La Seductora and Zeuxis defeated Dalys la Caribeña, Estrellita and Marcela	Six-man "Lucha Libre rules" tag team match
3	Audaz, Guerrero Maya Jr. and Rey Cometa defeated Puma, Tiger and Virus	Best two-out-of-three falls Lucha de Apuestas, hair vs. hair, match
4	Ángel de Oro, Diamante Azul and Niebla Roja defeated Los TGR (Rey Bucanero, Shocker and El Terrible) by disqualification	Six-man "Lucha Libre rules" tag team match
5	Máscara Año 2000 and Negro Casas defeated Los Cadetes del Espacio (El Solar and Súper Astro)	Best two-out-of-three falls tag team match
6	Atlantis and Blue Panther defeated Fuerza Guerrera and El Satánico	Best two-out-of-three falls tag team match

=== Luchas de Apuestas ===
Unlike most sports or sports entertainment around the world Lucha Libre holds championships in less regards compared to the prestige of winning a Lucha de Apuesta, literally a "bet match". In a Lucha de Apuesta match each competitor "Bets" either their wrestling mask or hair on the outcome of the match and if they lose must unmask or have their hair shaved off in the ultimate form of humiliation. Since the mask holds a sacred place in Lucha Libre the most prestigious Apuesta is the mask, once it is lost a wrestler is not allowed to put the mask back on when wrestling. As part of the tradition an unmasked wrestler must also reveal their "true identity", which means give their birth name, age and wrestling experience as they lose the "anonymity" of the enmascarado character. Over the years Arena Coliseo has been host to a number of Luchas de Apuestas, including one that many consider the biggest Luchas de Apuestas match where Lucha Libre icon El Santo defeated and unmasked Black Shadow in 1952. Below is a list of all documented Luchas de Apuestas that have taken place in Arena Coliseo since its completion in 1943.

Date	Winner(s)	Loser(s)	Bet(s)
April 8, 1944	El Santo	Jack O'Brien	Hair
May 2, 1952	Torbellino Blanco	Sugi Sito	Hair
July 26, 1952	Médico Asesino	Tonina Jackson	Hair
November 7, 1952	El Santo	Black Shadow	Mask
December 3, 1955	El Santo	Halcón Negro	Mask
March 12, 1954	Blue Demon	Cavernario Galindo	Hair
June 14, 1955	Huracán Ramírez	Moloch	Mask
April 21, 1959	Mishima Ohta	Huroki Sito	Hair
February 9, 1962	Espanto I	Cavernario Galindo	Hair
March 20, 1964	Espanto I	Dory Dixon	Hair
March 12, 1965	Karloff Lagarde	Cavernario Galindo	Hair
December 10, 1965	Huracán Ramírez	El Scorpio	Mask
March 23, 1967	Rodolfo Ruiz	Sergio Barrayo	Hair
June 11, 1968	Black Shadow	Dory Dixon	Hair
February 20, 1972	El Audaz	Manuel Robles	Hair
February 27, 1976	El Vengador	El Satánico	Hair
July 16, 1976	Demonio Blanco	El Nazi	Hair
May 15, 1977	As Charro	Chino Chow	Hair
April 2, 1978	Talismán	Tauro	Hair
August 28, 1979	Cachorro Mendoza	El Satánico	Hair
September 21, 1979	Gran Cochisse	Américo Rocca	Hair
December 4, 1979	Sangre India	Chamaco Ortiz	Hair
October 7, 1980	Talismán	El Mago	Mask
March 21, 1981	Águila Solitaria	El Bastardo	Mask
April 3, 1981	Américo Rocca and Divino Roy	Gran Cochisse and Aguila India	Hair
September 29, 1981	Talismán	Tiburón	Mask
December 6, 1981	El Brazo	Antares	Mask
July 23, 1982	Franco Colombo	Divino Roy	Hair
August 17, 1982	Faisán and Franco Colombo	Pánico and Manuel Robles	Mask/Hair
November 16, 1982	Pánico	Faisán	Hair
January 30, 1983	Gran Cochisse	Leo López	Hair
February 1, 1983	Zorro Mendoza	Rey David	Hair
April 17, 1983	Gusano Yánez and Olímpico Flores	Pánico and Bruno Victoria	Hair
July 5, 1983	Gusano Yánez	Divino Roy	Hair
August 12, 1983	Jerry Estrada	Gusano Yánez	Hair
September 25, 1983	Cachorro Mendoza	Jerry Estrada	Hair
October 3, 1983	Tony Salazar	Chacho Herodes	Hair
October 28, 1983	Cachorro Mendoza	Carlos Plata	Hair
December 11, 1983	El Jalisco	Pirata Morgan	Hair
July 1, 1984	Pánico	Doberman	Hair
July 17, 1984	Américo Rocca and Grand Cochisse	Comando Ruso I and II	Hair
October 26, 1984	El Dandy	Javier Cruz	Hair
February 17, 1985	Rey David	Módulo	Hair
March 23, 1986	Javier Cruz	Franco Colombo	Hair
April 27, 1986	Enfermero Jr.	Lemus II	Hair
May 4, 1986	Talismán	Lemus II	Hair
August 31, 1986	El Dandy	Javier Cruz	Hair
August 16, 1987	Selene	La Guerrillera	Mask
July 17, 1988	Rocco Valente and Roberto Paz	Rojo and Reyes Veloz	Hair
February 14, 1988	Rokambole	El Macho	Mask
June 2, 1989	Mogur	El Egipcio	Hair
June 17, 1989	Gusano Yánez	El Macho I	Hair
February 16, 1990	Remo Banda	Comando Ruso	Hair
March 18, 1990	Mogur	El Macho	Hair
May 4, 1990	Bestia Salvaje	Cachorro Mendoza	Hair
June 1, 1990	Martha Villalobos	Rossy Moreno	Hair
August 10, 1990	El Scorpio	Cachorro Mendoza	Hair
August 17, 1990	Ringo Mendoza	El Scorpio	Hair
September 2, 1990	Gusano Yánez	Américo Rocca	Hair
October 28, 1990	Mogur	Hombre Bala	Hair
March 3, 1991	Zuleyma	Pantera Sureña	Hair
July 14, 1991	Baby Richard	Símbolo	Hair
August 2, 1991	Mascarita Sagrada	Piratita Morgan	Hair
September 1, 1991	Lola González	Karla Yvonne	Hair
March 8, 1992	Chamaco Ayala	Pánico	Hair
August 16, 1992	Bestia Salvaje	Ringo Mendoza	Hair
November 15, 1992	Gran Apache	Rey David	Hair
December 1, 1992	Shogun Bello	Incógnito	Mask
December 15, 1992	Brazo de Plata	Aarón Grundy	Hair
March 2, 1993	Javier Cruz	Ringo Mendoza	Hair
April 4, 1993	Máscara Mágica	Rey Barbaro	Mask
May 30, 1993	Corazón de León	Cromagnon	Hair
June 20, 1993	Tornado Negro	Águila India	Hair
July 4, 1993	Mestizo	Baby Richard	Hair
September 7, 1993	Grand Apache and Mestizo	Rojo and Reyes Veloz	Hair
September 21, 1993	Cachorro Mendoza	Chamaco Valaguez	Hair
November 14, 1993	La Sombra (Note: Not to be mistaken for the current La Sombra)	Supremo II	Mask
May 8, 1994	Américo Rocca	Kung Fu	Hair
October 4, 1994	Escudero Rojo	Mestizo	Hair
December 18, 1994	Apolo Dantés	Mogur	Hair
April 4, 1995	Ultratumbita	Máscarita Mágica	Mask
June 13, 1995	Chicago Express	Ciclón Ramírez	Hair
July 25, 1995	Américo Rocca	Reyes Veloz	Hair
August 9, 1995	Arkangel de la Muerte	La Sombra	Mask
August 29, 1995	Chicago Express	Ciclón Ramírez	Hair
November 12, 1995	Chicago Express	Javier Cruz	Hair
November 19, 1995	Astro Rey Jr.	Metálico	Mask
February 16, 1996	Américo Rocca	Ringo Mendoza	Hair
June 2, 1996	Reyes Veloz	El Vencedor	Hair
July 28, 1996	Lynx	Ángel de Plata (Note: Not the most recent Ángel de Plata)	Mask
September 1, 1996	Atlántico	Kung Fu	Hair
April 15, 1997	Brazo de Plata	Mano Negra	Hair
November 30, 1997	Tony Rivera	Reyes Veloz	Hair
February 1, 1998	Tony Rivera	Valentín Mayo	Hair
June 9, 1998	Rencor Latino	Apolo Chino	Mask
June 14, 1998	Ringo Mendoza and Tajiri	Chicago Express and Mogur	Hair
August 4, 1998	Tony Rivera	Guerrero de la Muerte	Hair
August 11, 1998	Tony Rivera	Guerrero del Futuro	Hair
November 15, 1998	Lady Apache	Tania la Guerrillera	Hair
August 30, 1998	Atlántico	Búfalo Salvaje	Mask
September 6, 1998	Ringo Mendoza	El Signo	Hair
November 15, 1998	Lady Apache	Tania la Guerrillera	Hair
December 15, 1998	Tony Rivera	Halcón Negro	Hair
December 19, 1999	Tony Rivera	Halcón Negro	Hair
April 27, 1999	Américo Rocca	Kid Guzmán	Hair
May 16, 1999	El Toreo	Guerrero del Futuro	Hair
October 19, 1999	Tigre Blanco	Súper Cacao	Mask
December 19, 1999	Tony Rivera	Halcón Negro	Hair
March 21, 2000	Tony Rivera	Mr. México	Hair
May 1, 2000	Brazo de Oro	Valentín Mayo	Hair
May 18, 2000	Tony Rivera	Súper Cacao	Hair
May 28, 2000	Ricky Marvin	Súper Cacao	Hair
May 30, 2000	Ricky Marvin	Fiero	Hair
July 23, 2000	Sangre Azteca	Pegaso II	Mask
March 4, 2001	Mano Negra	Mr. México	Hair
May 27, 2001	Ricky Marvin	Américo Rocca	Hair
September 16, 2001	Guerrero del Futuro	Chris Stone	Hair
October 14, 2001	Ricky Marvin	El Hijo del Gladiador	Hair
October 28, 2001	Alan Stone	Guerrero del Futuro	Hair
June 16, 2002	Súper Kendo	Solar II	Mask
August 11, 2002	Rey Bucanero	Brazo de Platino	Hair
December 15, 2002	Guerrero del Futuro	Solar II	Hair
February 18, 2003	Pierroth Jr.	Apolo Dantés	Hair
June 15, 2003	Takemura	Mr. México	Hair
October 19, 2003	Ringo Mendoza	Guerrero del Futuro	Hair
November 30, 2003	Máscara Año 2000	El Satánico	Hair
June 20, 2004	Veneno	Tony Rivera	Hair
December 5, 2004	Negro Casas	Okumura	Hair
April 2, 2006	Stuka Jr.	La Flecha	Mask
June 5, 2006	Máximo	Loco Max	Hair
August 13, 2006	India Sioux	Medusa	Mask
June 18, 2006	Rey Bucanero	Okumura	Hair
October 29, 2006	Máximo	Emilio Charles Jr.	Hair
March 18, 2007	Leono	Mogur	Hair
April 15, 2007	Stuka Jr.	El Jeque	Mask
July 17, 2007	Bam Bam	Pequeño Halloween	Hair
July 24, 2007	Bam Bam	Demus 3:16	Hair
August 5, 2007	Virus	Tony Rivera	Hair
July 16, 2008	Bam Bam	Pequeño Violencia	Hair
August 17, 2008	Demus 3:16	Bam Bam	Hair
October 5, 2008	Loco Max	Tony Rivera	Hair

== See also ==
- CMLL Arena Coliseo Tag Team Championship
