= 1948 in professional wrestling =

1948 in professional wrestling describes the year's events in the world of professional wrestling.

== Gallery ==
Video footage of professional wrestling in 1948
A professional wrestling match between 'Killer' Leteur vs 'Hairy' Hessle in Paris, France in 1948

Footage of a tag-team match between two of the Dusek brothers against "Moquin and Watson of Canada" in Montreal in 1948

Highlight reel of Gorgeous George - first demonstrating his character before transitioning to footage of him performing in the ring. (No Sound)

== List of notable promotions ==
Only one promotion held notable shows in 1948.

Promotion Name	Abbreviation
Empresa Mexicana de Lucha Libre	EMLL

== Supercards and tournaments ==
Date	Promotion(s)	Event	Location	Main Event
September 22	EMLL	15th Anniversary Show (1)	Mexico City, Mexico	Ciclón Veloz defeated Blue Demon by disqualification in a best two-out-of-three falls match
September 24	EMLL	15th Anniversary Show (2)	Mexico City, Mexico	Tarzán López (c) defeated Harry Fields in a best two-out-of-three falls match for the NWA World Middleweight Championship
(c) – denotes defending champion(s)

== Notable events ==
- July 18 – professional wrestling promotors Pinkie George, Orville Brown, Al Haft, Harry Light, Sam Muchnick, Don Owen, and Tony Stecher form the National Wrestling Alliance (NWA), a governing body who would be the primary influence on professional wrestling in North America until the mid-1980s.
- September – Alejandro Muñoz Moreno debuts the Blue Demon wrestling persona in Mexico City. He would go on to become one of the most famous professional wrestlers in lucha libre as well as act in 26 lucha films.
- Stu Hart and Al Oeming created Klondike Wrestling (later known as Stampede Wrestling).

== Title changes ==
=== EMLL ===
NWA World Middleweight Championship
Incoming champion – Gory Guerrero
Date	Winner	Event/Show	Note(s)
April 12	Mike Kelly	EMLL Show	

NWA World Welterweight Championship
Incoming champion – Jack O’Brien
No title changes

Mexican National Light Heavyweight Championship
incoming champion – Tarzan Lopez
No title changes

Mexican National Middleweight Championship
incoming champion – Tarzán López
No title changes

Mexican National Lightweight Championship
Incoming champion – Emilio Charles
Date	Winner	Event/Show	Note(s)
Uncertain	Vacated	N/A	The championship was vacated for undocumented reasons
August 5	Joe Marin	EMLL Show	
October 18	Black Shadow	EMLL Show	

Mexican National Heavyweight Championship
Incoming champion – Firpo Segura
No title changes

Mexican National Welterweight Championship
incoming champion – Vacant
No title changes

=== NWA ===
NWA Worlds Heavyweight Championship
New
Date	Winner	Event/Show	Note(s)
July 14	Orville Brown	NWA show	The NWA voted to recognize Brown as the Worlds Champion. Defeated Sonny Myers to solidify the claim.

== Awards and honors ==
- Luchador of the Year
  - Tarzán López (Mexico)

== Arts and entertainment ==
- Angelo Poffo's world record for most consecutive sit-ups (6,033) is featured on the March 3 edition of Ripley's Believe It or Not! comic strip.

== Debuts ==
- March 31 – Blue Demon
- November 24 – Tiny Mills
- Date uncertain

- Bronco Lubich
- The Fabulous Moolah
- George Scott
- Johnny Barend
- Lord Athol Layton
- Nelson Royal
- Ray Gunkel

== Retirements ==
- Ed Lewis (1905-March 29, 1948)

== Births ==
- January 8 – Bobby Jaggers, American professional wrestler (d. 2012)
- January 11 – Wajima Hiroshi, Japanese professional wrestler (d. 2018)
- January 30 – Black Bart (d. 2025)
- February 7 – Kim Duk, Japanese professional wrestler
- February 19 – Big John Studd, American professional wrestler (d. 1995)
- March 3 - Ron Fuller, American professional wrestler
- March 13 - Estela Molina, Mexican professional wrestler (d. 2025)
- March 14 - King Cobra, American professional wrestler
- May 15 – Coloso Colosetti, Argentinian professional wrestler (d. 2024)
- June 2 – Cynthia Peretti, American professional wrestler (d. 2009)
- June 23 – Earl Oliver, American wrestling columnist and historian
- June 24 - Mickey Doyle
- June 29 – Leo Burke, Canadian professional wrestler (died in 2024)
- July 7 - Tom Hankins (wrestler), American professional wrestler
- July 11 - Ernie Holmes, American professional wrestler and footballer (died in 2008)
- July 18 – Carlos Colón Sr., Puerto Rican professional wrestler and wrestling promoter
- July 27 – Greg Gagne, American professional wrestler
- July 28 – Bobby Bold Eagle, American wrestler
- August 6 – Dino Bravo, Canadian professional wrestler (d. 1993)
- August 8 - Dee Booher, American professional wrestler (d. 2022)
- August 27 – Sgt. Slaughter, American professional wrestler
- September 3 - Butcher Brannigan, American professional wrestler (d. 2009)
- September 8 – Great Kabuki, Japanese professional wrestler
- September 12:
  - Rocky Hata (d. 1991)
  - Roberto Soto
- September 21 – Mitsuo Momota, Japanese professional wrestler
- September 26 – Kazuo Sakurada, Japanese professional wrestler (d. 2020)
- September 29 – Jaque Mate, Mexican luchador
- October 3 – Johnny Legend, American professional wrestling promoter (d. 2026)
- October 4 – Linda McMahon, wrestling executive
- October 15 – Savannah Jack (died in 2012)
- November 4 - Buzz Tyler (died in 2021)
- November 12 - Goro Tsurumi (died in 2022)
- November 28 – Smith Hart, Canadian professional wrestler (d. 2017)
- December 21 – Ron Bass, American professional wrestler (d. 2017)
- December 28 - Izzy Slapawitz, American professional wrestler (d. 2019)

== Deaths ==
- August 16 - Babe Ruth, 53
