= EMLL 18th Anniversary Show =

Mexican Professional wrestling show

- Promotion: Empresa Mexicana de Lucha Libre
- Date: September 21, 1951
- City: Mexico City, Mexico
- Venue: Arena Modelo
- Attendance: 10,000

EMLL Anniversary Show chronology
← Previous; 17th Anniversary	Next → 19th Anniversary

The EMLL 18th Anniversary Show (Spanish: 18. Aniversario de EMLL) was a professional wrestling major show event produced by Empresa Mexicana de Lucha Libre (EMLL) that took place on September 21, 1951, in Arena Modelo, Mexico City, Mexico. The event commemorated the 18th anniversary of EMLL, which would become the oldest professional wrestling promotion in the world. The Anniversary show is EMLL's biggest show of the year, their Super Bowl event. The EMLL Anniversary Show series is the longest-running annual professional wrestling show, starting in 1934.

== Production ==
=== Background ===
The 1951 Anniversary show commemorated the 18th anniversary of the Mexican professional wrestling company Empresa Mexicana de Lucha Libre (Spanish for "Mexican Wrestling Promotion"; EMLL) holding their first show on September 22, 1933 by promoter and founder Salvador Lutteroth. EMLL was rebranded early in 1992 to become Consejo Mundial de Lucha Libre ("World Wrestling Council"; CMLL) signal their departure from the National Wrestling Alliance. With the sales of the Jim Crockett Promotions to Ted Turner in 1988 EMLL became the oldest, still-operating wrestling promotion in the world. Over the years EMLL/CMLL has on occasion held multiple shows to celebrate their anniversary but since 1977 the company has only held one annual show, which is considered the biggest show of the year, CMLL's equivalent of WWE's WrestleMania or their Super Bowl event. CMLL has held their Anniversary show at Arena México in Mexico City, Mexico since 1956, the year the building was completed, over time Arena México earned the nickname "The Cathedral of Lucha Libre" due to it hosting most of EMLL/CMLL's major events since the building was completed. EMLL held their first anniversary show at Arena Modelo in 1933 and returned to that building in 1937 through 1943. From 1934 through 1936 EMLL rented Arena Nacional for their shows, but in 1944 they began holding their anniversary shows at Arena Coliseo, an arena they owned. From 1944 through 1955 EMLL held all their anniversary shows at Arena Coliseo. Traditionally EMLL/CMLL holds their major events on Friday Nights, replacing their regularly scheduled Super Viernes show.

=== Storylines ===
The event featured an undetermined number of professional wrestling matches with different wrestlers involved in pre-existing scripted feuds, plots and storylines. Wrestlers were portrayed as either heels (referred to as rudos in Mexico, those that portray the "bad guys") or faces (técnicos in Mexico, the "good guy" characters) as they followed a series of tension-building events, which culminated in a wrestling match or series of matches. Due to the nature of keeping mainly paper records of wrestling at the time no documentation has been found for some of the matches of the show.

== Event ==
In one of the verified matches Emilio Charles, defeated the legendary Murciélago Velázquez, who was nearing the end of his in-ring career. The show also saw Fernando Oses defeat Jalisco Gonzales. In what would be a preview of many future matches between the two El Santo defeated Black Shadow in a regular match. Lucha Libre pioneer Bobby Bonales, who had helped make EMLL popular in its early years defeated Cavernario Galindo whose days as a headliner still lay ahead of him. NWA World Middleweight Champion Sugi Sito had won the championship at the previous year's anniversary show but was unable to hold on to it as challenger Enrique Llanes defeated him two falls to one to win the championship.

== Aftermath ==
EMLL stripped Enrique Llanes of the NWA World Middleweight Championship in early 1952, the exact reason why this took place has not been found documented. El Santo and Black Shadow would face off in one of the most famous Lucha de Apuesta ("bet matches") just over a year later, with El Santo unmasking his opponent as a result of the match.

== Results ==
No.	Results	Stipulations
1	Emilio Charles defeated Murciélago Velázquez	Singles match
2	Fernando Oses defeated Jalisco Gonzales.	Singles match
3	El Santo defeated Black Shadow	Singles match
4	Bobby Bonales defeated Cavernario Galindo	Singles match
5	Enrique Llanes defeated Sugi Sito (c)	Best two-out-of three falls match for the NWA World Middleweight Championship
(c) / – the champion(s) heading into the match
