= EMLL 15th Anniversary Show =

Mexican Professional wrestling show

- Promotion: Empresa Mexicana de Lucha Libre
- Date: September 22, 1948; September 24, 1948
- City: Mexico City, Mexico
- Venue: Arena Coliseo; Arena Modelo

EMLL Anniversary Show chronology
← Previous; 14th Anniversary	Next → 16th Anniversary

Mexican professional wrestling promotion Empresa Mexicana de Lucha Libre (EMLL) commemorated their 15th anniversary with two EMLL 15th Anniversary Shows (Spanish: 15. Aniversario de EMLL). The first Anniversary show was held on September 22, 1948, in Arena Coliseo in Mexico City, Mexico, EMLL's main venue. The second event took place two days later on September 24, 1948, in Arena Modelo. The events commemorated the 15th anniversary of EMLL, which would later become the oldest professional wrestling promotion in the world. The Anniversary show is EMLL's biggest show of the year, their Super Bowl event. The first anniversary show featured the EMLL debut of Blue Demon, who would later become one of the iconic figures of Mexican wrestling. The EMLL Anniversary Show series is the longest-running annual professional wrestling show, starting in 1934.

== Production ==
=== Background ===
The 1948 Anniversary show commemorated the 15th anniversary of the Mexican professional wrestling company Empresa Mexicana de Lucha Libre (Spanish for "Mexican Wrestling Promotion"; EMLL) holding their first show on September 22, 1933 by promoter and founder Salvador Lutteroth. EMLL was rebranded early in 1992 to become Consejo Mundial de Lucha Libre ("World Wrestling Council"; CMLL) signal their departure from the National Wrestling Alliance. With the sales of the Jim Crockett Promotions to Ted Turner in 1988 EMLL became the oldest, still-operating wrestling promotion in the world. Over the years EMLL/CMLL has on occasion held multiple shows to celebrate their anniversary but since 1977 the company has only held one annual show, which is considered the biggest show of the year, CMLL's equivalent of WWE's WrestleMania or their Super Bowl event. CMLL has held their Anniversary show at Arena México in Mexico City, Mexico since 1956, the year the building was completed, over time Arena México earned the nickname "The Cathedral of Lucha Libre" due to it hosting most of EMLL/CMLL's major events since the building was completed. EMLL held their first anniversary show at Arena Modelo in 1933 and returned to that building in 1937 through 1943. From 1934 through 1936 EMLL rented Arena Nacional for their shows, but in 1944 they began holding their anniversary shows at Arena Coliseo, an arena they owned. From 1944 through 1955 EMLL held all their anniversary shows at Arena Coliseo. Traditionally EMLL/CMLL holds their major events on Friday Nights, replacing their regularly scheduled Super Viernes show.

=== Storylines ===
The event featured an undetermined number of professional wrestling matches with different wrestlers involved in pre-existing scripted feuds, plots and storylines. Wrestlers were portrayed as either heels (referred to as rudos in Mexico, those that portray the "bad guys") or faces (técnicos in Mexico, the "good guy" characters) as they followed a series of tension-building events, which culminated in a wrestling match or series of matches. Due to the nature of keeping mainly paper records of wrestling at the time no documentation has been found for some of the matches of the show.

== Event ==
The first of the Anniversary shows featured at least four matches including the main event match which was the debut of Blue Demon in EMLL, losing to Ciclón Veloz by disqualification when Blue Demon's rudo tactics were noticed by the referee. Records indicated that there were two preliminary matches on the September 24th show, but records of neither the participants nor the actual results of these matches have been confirmed. The third match of the night featured Rito Romero wrestling against Black Shadow, but no record of who won is found. Likewise the results of the fourth match between Gory Guerrero and Bobby Bonales are also undocumented. In the main event NWA World Middleweight Champion Tarzán López successfully defended the championship against the challenger Harry Fields in a Best two-out-of three falls match.

== Results September 22 ==
No.	Results	Stipulations
1	Ciclón Veloz defeated Blue Demon by disqualification	Best two-out-of-three falls match
2	Black Shadow defeated Rito Romero	Best two-out-of-three falls match
3	Gory Guerrero defeated Bobby Bonales	Best two-out-of-three falls match
4	Tarzán López defeated Mike Kelly	Best two-out-of-three falls match

== Results September 24 ==
No.	Results	Stipulations
1	Rito Romero defeated Black Shadow by disqualification	Best two-out-of-three falls match
2	Bobby Bonales defeated Gory Guerrero	Best two-out-of-three falls match
3	Tarzán López (c) defeated Harry Fields	Best two-out-of-three falls match for the NWA World Middleweight Championship
(c) / – the champion(s) heading into the match
