= EMLL 28th Anniversary Show =

Mexican Professional wrestling show

- Promotion: Empresa Mexicana de Lucha Libre
- Date: September 22, 1961
- City: Mexico City, Mexico
- Venue: Arena México
- Attendance: 17,000

EMLL Anniversary Show chronology
← Previous; 27th Anniversary	Next → 29th Anniversary

The EMLL 28th Anniversary Show (Spanish: 28. Aniversario de EMLL) was a professional wrestling major show event produced by Empresa Mexicana de Lucha Libre (EMLL) that took place on September 22, 1961, in Arena México, Mexico City, Mexico. The event commemorated the 28th anniversary of EMLL, which became the oldest professional wrestling promotion in the world. The Anniversary show is EMLL's biggest show of the year. The EMLL Anniversary Show series is the longest-running annual professional wrestling show, starting in 1934.

== Production ==
=== Background ===
The 1961 Anniversary show commemorated the 28th anniversary of the Mexican professional wrestling company Empresa Mexicana de Lucha Libre (Spanish for "Mexican Wrestling Promotion"; EMLL) holding their first show on September 22, 1933 by promoter and founder Salvador Lutteroth. EMLL was rebranded early in 1992 to become Consejo Mundial de Lucha Libre ("World Wrestling Council"; CMLL) signal their departure from the National Wrestling Alliance. With the sales of the Jim Crockett Promotions to Ted Turner in 1988 EMLL became the oldest, still-operating wrestling promotion in the world. Over the years EMLL/CMLL has on occasion held multiple shows to celebrate their anniversary but since 1977 the company has only held one annual show, which is considered the biggest show of the year, CMLL's equivalent of WWE's WrestleMania or their Super Bowl event. CMLL has held their Anniversary show at Arena México in Mexico City, Mexico since 1956, the year the building was completed, over time Arena México earned the nickname "The Cathedral of Lucha Libre" due to it hosting most of EMLL/CMLL's major events since the building was completed. Traditionally EMLL/CMLL holds their major events on Friday Nights, replacing their regularly scheduled Super Viernes show.

=== Storylines ===
The event featured an undetermined number of professional wrestling matches with different wrestlers involved in pre-existing scripted feuds, plots and storylines. Wrestlers were portrayed as either heels (referred to as rudos in Mexico, those that portray the "bad guys") or faces (técnicos in Mexico, the "good guy" characters) as they followed a series of tension-building events, which culminated in a wrestling match or series of matches. Due to the nature of keeping mainly paper records of wrestling at the time no documentation has been found for some of the matches of the show.

== Event ==
In one of only two confirmed matches for the 28th Anniversary celebration saw NWA World Middleweight Champion René Guajardo successfully turn back the challenges of El Santo. In the other confirmed match, Gory Guerrero successfully defended the NWA World Light Heavyweight Championship against Ray Mendoza, defeating him two falls to one.

== Aftermath ==
Rene Guajardo's first of a record setting six NWA World Middleweight Championship reigns ended only a few months later when Antonio Posa won the title on December 2, 1961. Gory Guerrero's run with the NWA World Light Heavyweight Championship lasted for almost two more years, until August 6, 1963, when he lost the title to Ali Bey.

== Results ==
No.	Results	Stipulations
1	René Guajardo (c) defeated El Santo	Best two-out-of-three falls match for the NWA World Middleweight Championship
2	Gory Guerrero (c) defeated Ray Mendoza	Best two-out-of-three falls match for the NWA World Light Heavyweight Championship
(c) / – the champion(s) heading into the match
