= Guerrero family =

Professional wrestling family

The Guerrero family is a Mexican-American family that has been involved with professional wrestling for three generations. The patriarch of the family, Gory Guerrero, made his debut on September 15, 1937. Members of the Guerrero family have worked for virtually all major wrestling promotions around the world including World Wrestling Federation/Entertainment, World Championship Wrestling, Extreme Championship Wrestling, the National Wrestling Alliance, the American Wrestling Association, New Japan Pro-Wrestling, All Japan Pro Wrestling, Consejo Mundial de Lucha Libre, Total Nonstop Action Wrestling, Lucha Underground, and All Elite Wrestling.

== Members ==
Gory Guerrero (1921–1990), the patriarch of the Guerrero wrestling family, was one of the early pioneers in Mexican lucha libre and has been credited with the invention of the Camel Clutch. Gory married Herlinda Llanes, whose three brothers Enrique, Mario and Sergio Yañez were all professional wrestlers. Enrique's son Javier was also a professional wrestler, and Javier's son wrestles for CMLL as Pendulo.

Together Gory and Herlinda had six children, two daughters and four sons – their sons would all end up in professional wrestling:

- Chavo Guerrero Sr. (1949–2017): The oldest son of Gory Guerrero made his debut in 1974 and was active until 2004 where he was released by World Wrestling Entertainment.
  - Chavo Guerrero Jr. (born 1970): Chavo's son, made his debut in 1994 as the first third-generation Guerrero to be a professional wrestler.
- Mando Guerrero (born 1950): The second oldest who also started in pro wrestling in 1971, worked mainly in California and with the American Wrestling Association in the 1980s.
- Héctor Guerrero (born 1954): started in pro wrestling in 1977, at one point worked for WWE as The Gobbledy Gooker and was working as a commentator on the Spanish announce team for Total Nonstop Action Wrestling until 2015.
- Eddie Guerrero (1967–2005): The youngest Guerrero brother by 13 years but also the most well known. Eddie married Vickie Guerrero (née Lara; born 1968) in 1990; Vickie would become a prominent wrestling personality in the years following Eddie's death.
  - Shaul Guerrero (born 1990): Eddie and Vickie's daughter, made her debut in 2010 under the ring name Raquel Diaz as the second third-generation Guerrero to be a professional wrestler. In 2016, Shaul married fellow wrestler Matthew Rehwoldt (born 1987), who wrestled as Aiden English in WWE.

== History ==
Gory Guerrero, a legendary luchador, had four sons and all of them became wrestlers. His two elder sons Chavo and Mando debuted in the same year, 1974. Chavo wrestled the earlier part of his career in Los Angeles, California based NWA Hollywood Wrestling where he won Heavyweight and Tag Team titles many times. In 1976, Chavo formed a tag team with his father Gory and the duo wrestled in NWA Hollywood. They were the first members of the Guerrero family to make a tag team. On February 27, Chavo and Gory defeated Karl Von Brauner and Senior X to win the NWA Americas Tag Team Championship. However, their reign was cut short as on the next day, they lost the titles to Roddy Piper and Crusher Verdu. Gory fell into semi-retirement, ending the tag team of father and son. Chavo began teaming with other wrestlers in WWA roster and exchanged titles with Piper and Verdu while Gory retired in the 1980s.

Chavo formed a new tag team with his brother Hector on January 13, 1978, when they defeated Black Gordman and Goliath to win the NWA Americas Tag Team Championship. This was the second tag team made up of Guerrero family members. This tag team version was better than Chavo's tag team with his father Gory. The two brothers, Chavo and Hector managed to hold the titles for a half month before losing them to Ron Bass and Dr. Hiro Ota on February 5. The two brothers teamed with separate wrestlers and exchanged the titles with Ron Bass and his partners before their team ended. Chavo continued his success in WWA. Hector formed a tag team with his elder brother Mando which debuted on June 29, 1979, when they defeated The Twin Devils for the NWA Americas Tag Team Championship. It was Hector's fourth individual reign and Mando's third individual reign while their first together. They lost the titles back to Twin Devils on July 6 before regaining the titles later that same month. On August 4, Hector and Mando lost the titles to Leroy Brown and Allen Coage. They won the titles with separate partners before defeating Ryuma Go and Mr. Toyo in their reunion on July 9, 1982, for their third Americas Tag Titles. The next month, they lost the titles to Timothy Flowers and Adrian Street.

They had a third and final reunion in the independent circuit where they won the UWC Tag Team Championship. Chavo and Hector reunited in Championship Wrestling from Florida (CWF) on July 14, 1984, when they won the NWA Florida United States Tag Team Championship by defeating Mike Rotunda and Barry Windham. They held the titles for three months before Chavo quit in September. On October 2, Cocoa Samoa substituted Chavo and teamed with Hector to defend the titles against Jim Neidhart and Khrusher Khruschev. This caused Chavo and Hector to lose the titles to Neidhart and Khruschev and the team of Chavo and Hector disbanded.

In the American Wrestling Association, Chavo and Mando teamed together to go after the AWA World Tag Team Championship held by Diamond Dallas Page's team of Badd Company (Paul Diamond and Pat Tanaka) but did not win the tag team titles. At SuperClash III, representing the AWA against the Continental Wrestling Association on December 13, 1988, Hector, Chavo, and Mando defeat the team of Cactus Jack and the Rock 'n' Roll RPMs.

Chavo then formed a six-man tag team with his brothers Mando and Eddie in 1989 in the Mexican World Wrestling Association (WWA). They won the WWA World Trios Championship on April 30, defeating American Mercenaries (Bill Anderson, Louie Spicolli and Tim Patterson) before losing the titles back to American Mercenaries on July 28. Hector and Eddie formed a tag team in May 1998 in Carolinas based-Pro Wrestling Federation (PWF). On May 22, 1998, they defeated Super Ninja and Black Angel for the titles.

Eddie began an angle with Chavo's son Chavo Guerrero, Jr. in 1998 while both were employed by World Championship Wrestling, marking the first time that Guerreros were aligned together on national television. They teamed and feuded with each other during that time until the angle ended when Eddie formed Latino World Order. The two then reunited in World Wrestling Entertainment on the SmackDown! brand in 2002 and formed a tag team called Los Guerreros. They found success on SmackDown!, winning the WWE Tag Team Championship twice. The team broke in 2004 after Chavo turned on Eddie due to jealousy stemming from Eddie's popularity.

Following the breakup of the Los Guerreros, Chavo Guerrero Jr. was soon joined by his father Chavo Guerrero Sr. who was later to be known as "Chavo Classic", and was primarily his son's manager throughout the run.

Following Chavo's loss to Eddie at the Royal Rumble, Chavo was jealous of Rey Mysterio in the storyline because Mysterio had sung the theme song of the upcoming pay-per-view event, No Way Out, and because Mysterio was Cruiserweight Champion. Guerrero won the Cruiserweight Championship at No Way Out. A few months later on SmackDown!, Chavo Guerrero challenged anybody to a match for the Cruiserweight title. Jacqueline accepted the challenge and won the title. At Judgment Day, Chavo regained the Cruiserweight Championship with one arm tied behind his back; however, Chavo Classic won the title by accident on that week's SmackDown! in a triple threat match when Spike Dudley knocked him onto Chavo. Chavo Classic went on to hold the belt for about a month before he lost it to Rey Mysterio. Chavo Classic was later fired by WWE for no-showing. He felt he should have been portrayed as a legend rather than a comedy act.

The Guerreros would then reunite in WWE in 2006 when the widow of Eddie Guerrero, Vickie Guerrero acted as the manager/valet for Chavo, who was upset about Eddie's name being used by non-Guerreros (namely Rey Mysterio, with whom they maintained their first feud with). The duo used the cheating tactics that made the Guerreros famous, though this time to the dismay of the audience instead of the delight. It wasn't long after the end of their feud with Rey that Chris Benoit (another close friend of Eddie) started questioning their motives, leading to them feuding with Benoit over the course of a few short months, with Chavo becoming the number one contender for Benoit's WWE United States Championship, though failing at each opportunity mainly because of Vickie's actions constantly getting him disqualified, leading to Vickie leaving Chavo (she soon after declared in late January in backstage interviews with Kristal Marshall that she would be returning to SmackDown! soon, though disappeared off of WWE television directly after). It wasn't until mid-February at No Way Out 2007 that Chavo became WWE Cruiserweight Champion after emerging victorious in a Cruiserweight Open, which saw him as a surprise entry, pinning Jimmy Wang Yang to eliminate him last and win the title from Gregory Helms, ending Helms' more than a year-long reign.

In 2008, Chavo and Vickie would form an "extended family" with Vickie's lover Edge, after interference by Edge allowed Chavo to win the ECW Championship. The stable was referred to on-screen as La Familia and also included the Rated-R Entourage, Curt Hawkins and Zack Ryder, and Chavo's then-bodyguard, Bam Neely. La Familia broke up later in the year, after Vickie and Edge's relationship troubles led to the return of The Undertaker. Vickie and Chavo would then align with Big Show to keep The Undertaker off of their backs. Later, Chavo and Vickie would also realign with the returning Edge. In 2009, Vickie took advantage of Randy Orton's attacks on the McMahon family to take control of both Raw and SmackDown. Vickie would later leave SmackDown to become the permanent General Manager of Raw, leaving Edge on SmackDown although their kayfabe-marriage remained intact. Chavo would be subsequently drafted to Raw, continuing his role as his aunt Vickie's "gofer," although constantly overriding her authority by booking matches. In 2010, Vickie became the "Official Consultant" to then General Manager of SmackDown, Theodore Long. Chavo then began supporting Vickie and her new storyline lover, Dolph Ziggler. In 2011, Chavo was released from WWE, ending Los Guerreros. However, Vickie remained with the company until June 2014.

== Family tree ==
Gory Guerrero (1921–1990) | Herlinda Llanes (1927–2023)
Maria Guerrero (born 1948) | Chavo Guerrero Sr. (1949–2017) | Mando Guerrero (born 1950) | Héctor Guerrero (born 1954) | Linda Guerrero | Vickie Lara (born 1968) | Eddie Guerrero (1967–2005) | Tara Mahoney
Chavo Guerrero Jr. (born 1970) | Matt Rehwoldt (Aiden English) (born 1987) | Shaul Guerrero (Raquel Diaz) (born 1990) | Sherilyn Guerrero (born 1995) | Kaylie Guerrero (born 2002)

== Championships and accomplishments ==
- Gory Guerrero
  - Championships and accomplishments
- Chavo Guerrero Sr.
  - Championships and accomplishments
- Mando Guerrero
  - Championships and accomplishments
- Héctor Guerrero
  - Championships and accomplishments
- Eddie Guerrero
  - Championships and accomplishments
- Chavo Guerrero Jr.
  - Championships and accomplishments
- Raquel Diaz
  - Championships and accomplishments
- Aiden English
  - Championships and accomplishments
