= Rolando Vera =

Rolando Vera may refer to:

- Rolando Vera (wrestler) (1915–2001), Mexican professional wrestler and wrestling trainer
- Rolando Vera (runner) (born 1965), Ecuadorian long-distance runner
