= Rolando Vera (wrestler) =

Mexican professional wrestler (1915–2001)

Personal information
- Born: Rolando Hernández Verástegui; February 1, 1915 Monterrey, Nuevo León, Mexico
- Died: March 29, 2001 (aged 86) Monterrey, Nuevo León

Professional wrestling career
- Ring name: Rolando Vera

Rolando Hernández Verástegui (February 1, 1915 – March 29, 2001) was a Mexican professional wrestler and wrestling trainer, better known as Rolando Vera. One of the most popular professional wrestlers in Mexico in the 1950s, he was also an early star of Consejo Mundial de Lucha Libre. Vera wrestled throughout the world during his long career and held the NWA World Middleweight Champion for over four years. He also trained numerous wrestlers during his life including father-and-son Blue Demon and Blue Demon Jr., Sangre Chicana, Angel Mortal, René Guajardo and Sugi Sito.

== Professional wrestling career ==
Vera was born on February 1, 1915, in Monterrey, Nuevo León. Vera was the first local star in Nuevo León. He got his training in wrestling in Tampico, Tamaulipas, while working in a petroleum plant. During his rookie year, he was a recognizable face among the other local wrestlers, as he had been an amateur wrestler before becoming a professional. Vera has a legendary reputation as a tough wrestler, but he was not always a master of submission.

Also, Vera had a four-year reign as NWA World Middleweight Champion at a time when that belt was the greatest prize worldwide in professional wrestling. He won the belt from El Santo on October 19, 1956 in his home town of Monterrey, and lost it there on October 13, 1960 to his student René Guajardo.

He also wrestled in Germany, Cuba, France, England and the United States. Nevertheless, many consider the most important part of his career to be the time he spent as a trainer. He left as his legacy many great professional wrestlers, such as Blue Demon, René Guajardo, Mr. Lince, and Benny Morgan. He was a great técnico, an innovative wrestler (he created moves such as the Reinera and the Regiomontana). He died on March 29, 2001, at 11:30 pm after a heart attack while he slept in his home in Colonia Cumbres in Monterrey.

== Championships and accomplishments ==
- Empresa Mexicana de Lucha Libre
  - NWA World Middleweight Championship (1 time)
  - Occidente Middleweight Championship (2 times)

== Luchas de Apuestas record ==
Winner (wager)	Loser (wager)	Location	Event	Date	Notes
Rolando Vera (hair)	Hiena Roja (mask)	Monterrey, Nuevo León	Live event	May 19, 1953	
