= Ultratumbita =

Mexican professional wrestler

Personal information
- Died: March 25, 2018

Professional wrestling career
- Ring name: Ultratumbita

Ultratumbita (real name unrevealed) was a Mexican professional wrestler, best known for his work in Consejo Mundial de Lucha Libre's (CMLL) Minis division.

== Professional wrestling career ==
In 1992 then-CMLL booker Antonio Peña left CMLL to form his own promotion, Asistencia Asesoría y Administración (AAA); Peña had been the mastermind behind the CMLL Minis division and most of the Minis in CMLL decided to leave with Peña. Ultratumbita and a number of other professional wrestlers were brought in to replenish the division. Ultratumbita is a miniature version of regular sized wrestler Ultratumba. On September 11, 1993, Ultratumbita defeated Orito to win the CMLL World Mini-Estrella Championship, becoming the third champion. Ultratumbita held the Minis title for 520 days before losing it to Máscarita Mágica on February 13, 1995. In April 1995, Ultratumbita won a Lucha de Apuesta, or "bet match" over Máscarita Mágica as part of their storyline and forced Mágica to unmask. Ultratumbita has not wrestled since late 1995 / early 1996, the most likely reason is that the man behind the Ultratumbita mask was "repackaged" and given a new ring name and mask, but it has never been documented if this truly the case or not.

== Championships and accomplishments ==
- Consejo Mundial de Lucha Libre
  - CMLL World Mini-Estrella Championship (1 time)

== Luchas de Apuestas record ==
Winner (wager)	Loser (wager)	Location	Event	Date	Notes
Máscarita Mágica (mask)	Ultratumbita (mask)	Mexico City	Live event	N/A	
