= Pánico =

Chilean musical group

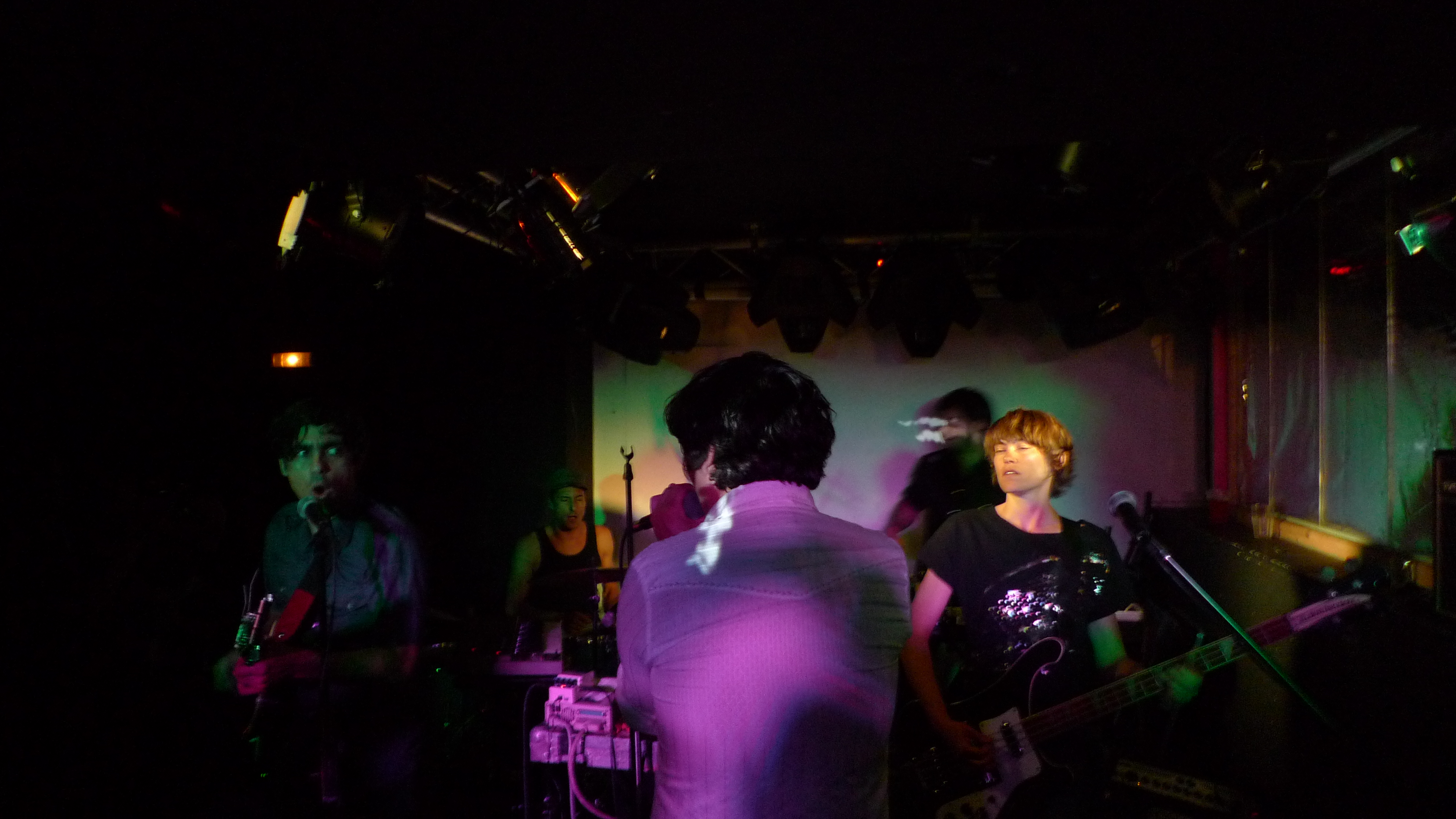
- Live concert by Panico band in 2008

Background information
- Origin: Santiago, Chile
- Genres: Psychedelic rock; alternative rock; post-punk; indie rock; dance-punk
- Years active: 1994–present
- Labels: Combo Discos; EMI; Tigersushi; Sony France; Chemikal Underground
- Members: Edi Pistolas; Caroline Tres Estrellas; Memoria Radial; Tatán Cavernícola; DJ Squat
- Past members: Juanito Zapatillas; Chow Cables; Mambo Bit
- Website: http://www.myspace.com/panicoband

Pánico is a Chilean alternative rock, psychedelic rock and post-punk band based in Paris, France.

== Early years and first tracks ==
The history of Pánico began in France, where Eduardo Edi Pistolas (Spanish for Edi Pistols), a Chilean living in France, met Caroline, Carolina tres estrellas (Three Stars Caroline), a schoolmate. After being in other bands like La Meta al Cielo and Bolero Boys, they traveled to Chile where they recruited Cristóbal, or Juanito Zapatillas (Sneakers Johnny), and Sebastián, or Tatán Cavernícola (Caveman Tatán), to create a new project called "Pánico".

From the beginning, they caught the attention of the media with their playful on-stage performances, while their fan base – who called themselves "Chicos y Chicas Pánico" (Pánico Boys and Girls) – slowly started to grow. They were known from the beginning for working independently with no record label, setting an example for other bands.

Their first album, Bruce Lee (independent), included the songs Fútbol, Yendo al hipermercado and No me digas que no, si quieres decir que sí. They then released their second album, Canciones para aprender a cantar, also independent, which contained a collection of low-fi tracks that would become some of their best-known classics, such as: Las cosas van más lento and El choclo.

In 1995, the label EMI started recruiting several Chilean bands, including Santos Dumont, Lucybell, Christianes and Pánico, to promote in the market with live performances, video clips, promotion and advertising.

In this period, the album Pornostar was released with EMI and, through EMI's promotion, Pánico began to reach more and more people. The single Demasiada confusión (Too much confusion) was widely played on Chilean radio. The album's sound was reminiscent of the Ramones and The Pixies and was praised by fans, but didn't meet EMI's sales expectations. After recording the EP Surfin' Maremoto (Tsunami Surfing) with EMI, they went back to producing records independently.

1997

Once again without a record label, the band tried to get some distance from playing small gigs and worked on improving the quality of their sound and music. They re-edited and relaunched the albums Canciones para aprender a cantar and Bruce Lee, and performed in several places around Chile. The same year Memoria Radial replace Juanito Zapatillas as guitar player and Chow Cables joined the band. Panico started to work on the album Rayo al ojo that brought together new and old Pánico tracks and mixed rock style with keyboard sounds.

1998

Dividing their time between Chile and Argentina, Pánico finally released the album Rayo al ojo (Beam to the eye). With this album, the band once again went on a national tour of Chile, performing in Santiago, Concepción and Valparaíso. They released the single Las cosas van más lento (Things are going slower), which would become one of the band's classics, still played today in their live shows.

Edi and Caroline also worked on their indie label Combo Discos, which was responsible for the release of Pánico's own albums as well as the albums of bands like Mambo Taxi and the French group Holden.

During 1998, they also released Pánico Remixes, which featured songs from Rayo al ojo and Panorámico (a Pánico album released in the European market) remixed by a group of invited DJs.

1999

In 1999, Pánico released their new sound, named by Edi Electro Tropical Destroy, on the local radio station "Rock and Pop". The style would surprise their fans and generate mixed reactions. In it the band tried to rescue tropical sounds, which were generally despised and rejected by the alternative local scene. This would mark the beginning of the end of Pánico's time in Chile.

2000 – 2004

After signing a contract with Sony France, Pánico played a couple of farewell shows in Santiago and Valparaíso. Once relocated in France, they released Telepathic Sonora an album produced in New York City with the collaboration of Yuka Honda (Cibo Matto lead singer), Money Mark, Arto Lindsay and Señor Coconut (Atom Heart).

The album, innovatively mixed tropical, punk, psychedelic and rock sounds, confused their old fans in Chile as well as their new fans and potential new audiences in Europe.

They continued performing in France but because of low sales of their album they were dropped by Sony France. Money problems and the departure of Philippe Boisier, who left the band to work on his personal project Icalma, made this period one of the most difficult stages in the band's history.

After this in 2003, Pánico released the EP Ice Cream in vinyl – another reinvention for the band that would mark the beginning of better times. They were gaining popularity and respect in the European underground, and released the album Subliminal Kill under the label Tigersushi Records, influenced by electronic music and with some tints of Latin American music. The album included covers of Tito Puente, Pérez Prado and lyrics in Spanglish, and was a very important album for the band, increasing their distribution like never before and giving them their first press reviews in magazines such as Les Inrockuptibles, Q and Mojo.

2005

"Subliminal Kill" re-injected energy into Pánico's career and brought them into contact with some of the most prestigious musical events in Europe. In August 2005, they performed at the Benicàssim Festival and Barcelona Acció Musical (BAM) festival and then went on to perform several gigs in London – where ‘'Subliminal Kill'’ appeared on the BBC and XFM London radio stations) – Berlin, Brussels, Montreal, New York City and Tel Aviv. Even the popular Scottish band Franz Ferdinand publicly expressed their interest in the Chileans' music, while the famous New Musical Express ranked the single Anfetaminado as one of the hundred best songs of the year.

2006

When the group announced a comeback tour to Chile in March 2006, nostalgic Pánico tribute shows had already started to appear in Santiago, with the participation of local bands like Gameover and Tio Lucho. The band sold out all their Chilean concert dates, and since then their visits to Chile have been more frequent.

2008

After the release of the EP Lupita the band launched their Pánico Summer Tour performing throughout northern, southern, and central Chile.

2010

2010 saw another small Chilean tour, while Gareth Jones edited and mixed their new album, Kick.

The same year, they traveled through the north of Chile crossing the Atacama nitrate mines and desert locations for the documentary movie "Pánico. La banda que buscó el sonido debajo" (Pánico, the band that found the sound beneath), directed by James June Schneider and Benjamín Echazarreta and released the following year.

In mid-2010, Pánico announced the release of their new album, Kick, under the UK label Chemikal Underground. In this album you can see the influences of both the Alternative rock of the 80s (in the style of Siouxsie and the Banshees and Theatre of Hate) and new trends like dance-punk. In June 2010, the band released the first two singles from the album: Bright Lights' and Reverberation Mambo.

== Discography ==
=== Studio albums ===
- 1995 – Pornostar
- 1997 – Canciones para aprender a cantar
- 1997 – Rayo al ojo
- 2001 – Telepathic Sonora
- 2005 – Subliminal Kill
- 2010 – Kick

=== EP ===
- 1994 – Pánico EP
- 1995 – Surfin' Maremoto
- 1997 – Panorámico
- 2003 – Ice Cream

=== Compilations ===
- 1998 – Pánico Remixes
- 2000 – Tributo a Los Prisioneros
- 2004 – Rock chileno de los '90, Vol.1
- 2005 – Modular presents: Leave them all behind
- 2005 – Les Inrockuptibles présentent objectif 2005 – Vol. 2
- 2007 – Catedral en coma. Vol. 2

=== Members ===
Current members

- Edi Pistolas
- Caroline Tres Estrellas
- Memoria Radial
- Tatán Cavernícola
- DJ Squat

Past members

- Juanito Zapatillas
- Chow Cables
- Mambo Bit
