= Cavernario Galindo =

Mexican luchador and actor

Rodolfo Galindo Ramírez
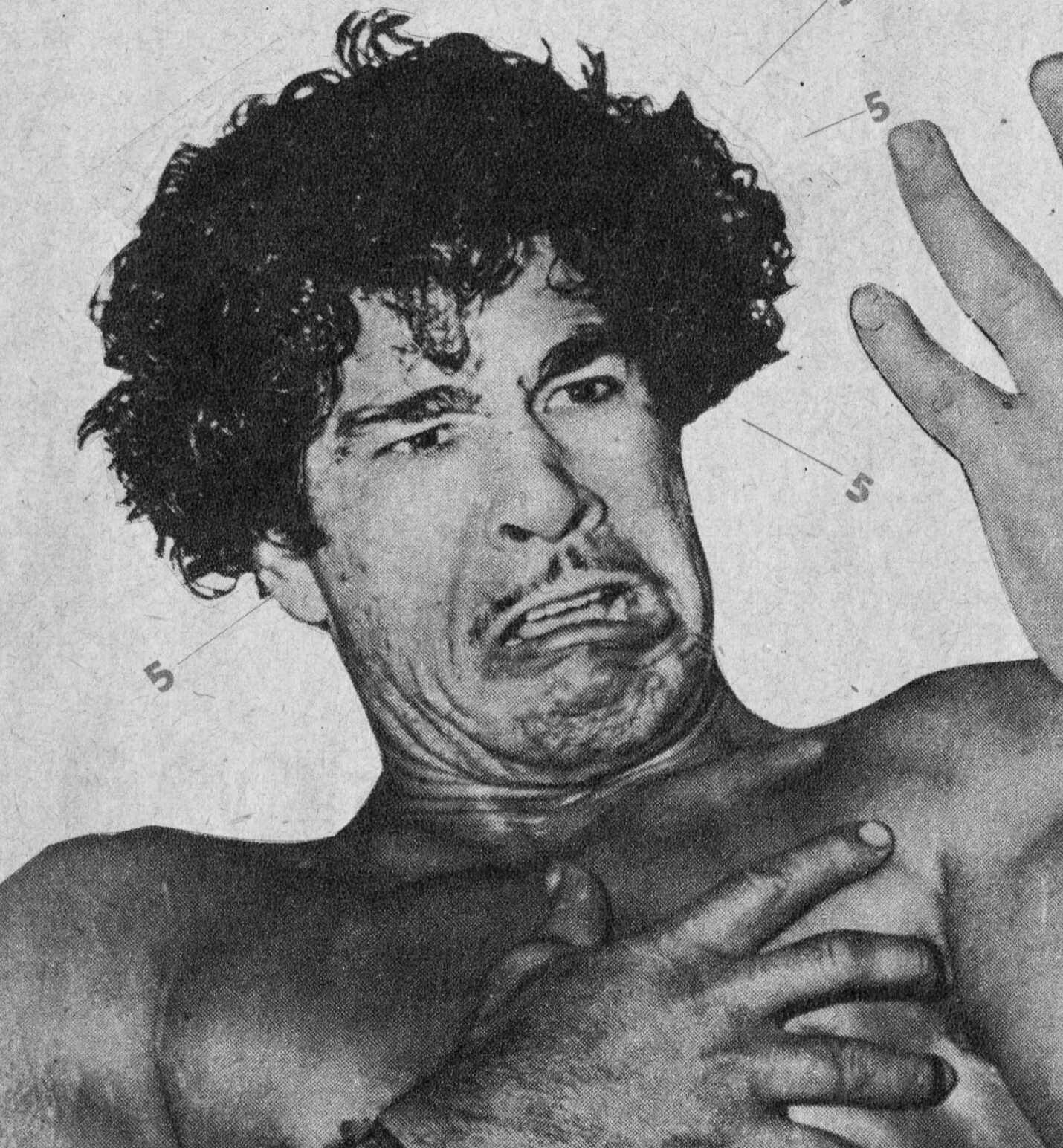
- Cavernario Galindo in 1954

Personal information
- Born: Rodolfo Galindo Ramirez; September 27, 1923 Chihuahua, Chihuahua, Mexico
- Died: July 19, 1999 (aged 75)

Professional wrestling career
- Ring name(s): Cavernario Galindo; El Cavernas; Ruddy Valentino; Ruddy Galindo
- Trained by: Diablo Velasco; Yaqui Joe; Jesús Garza
- Debut: 1938

Rodolfo Galindo Ramirez (September 27, 1923 – July 19, 1999) was a Mexican professional wrestler and film actor, best known by his ring name Cavernario Galindo (Caveman Galindo), who was active in Consejo Mundial de Lucha Libre from the 1930s to the 1990s. Well known for inventing La Cavernaria (a Modified surfboard hold), a commonly used submission hold in modern professional wrestling.

== Biography ==
Ramirez was born and raised in Chihuahua, Mexico. As a young boy he survived a car accident that would leave him with noticeable facial scars for the rest of his life.

Galindo made his debut as a professional wrestler in 1938 at the age of fifteen under the name Ruddy Valentino. He would also wrestle as Ruddy Galindo before taking up the name that made him famous. His slight build combined with his brawler style of fighting made it unlikely that he would find much success in professional wrestling.

A few years into Galindo's career Salvador Lutteroth, the founder and owner of Empresa Mexicana de la Lucha Libre noticed the young brawler and taking note of the young man's ugly appearance that resulted from his facial scars, gave him the gimmick as the animalistic Cavernario Galindo. Taking advantage of the opportunity, Galindo played his character for all that it was worth. In the ring his character would bite, claw, and brutally brawl with any opponent he came across to the boos of sold out crowds across Mexico. One particular story, which may be an urban legend, persists to this day. According to some accounts, in the 1940s, Galindo tore a live snake apart with his bare hands and teeth in front of a horrified audience before one of his matches.

On July 1, 1949, he defeated Tarzán Lopez in Mexico City to win the only title he'd ever hold during his career, the National Light Heavyweight Title. He successfully defended the title for more than a year until he lost it during December 1950 against Enrique Llanes.

The feud that defined Galindo's career more than any other took place in the 1950s. Gory Guerrero was a handsome and skilled technical wrestler, the exact opposite of Galindo's brawling character. Their multiple feuds are seen to this day as being among the bloodiest and most violent in the history of lucha libre. Galindo was known for his hoarse speaking voice which was the result of a throat injury he suffered during one of his matches against Guerrero. Galindo also feuded with the top luchadores of his generation, including El Santo, Blue Demon, and Black Shadow.

His popularity lasted for decades and he continued to wrestle until the 1990s, in his seventies. His career only ended when he broke one of his vertebra. He died a few years after this injury on July 19, 1999, at the age of seventy-five. In 1996, he was inducted into the Wrestling Observer Newsletter Hall of Fame.

== Championships and accomplishments ==
- Empresa Mexicana de Lucha Libre
  - Mexican National Light Heavyweight Championship (1 time)
  - Homenaje a Dos Leyendas honoree (2009)
- Wrestling Observer Newsletter awards
  - Wrestling Observer Newsletter Hall of Fame (Class of 1996)

== Luchas de Apuestas record ==
Winner (wager)	Loser (wager)	Location	Event	Date	Notes
El Santo (mask)	Cavernario Galindo (hair)	Mexico City	Live event	N/A	
Blue Demon (mask)	Cavernario Galindo (hair)	Mexico City	Live event	March 12, 1954	
Halcón Negro (hair)	Cavernario Galindo (hair)	Mexico City	EMLL 22nd Anniversary Show	September 16, 1955	
Cavernario Galindo (hair)	Bobby Bonales (hair)	Mexico City	Live event	1959	
Jorge Oropeza (hair)	Cavernario Galindo (hair)	Orizaba, Veracruz	Live event	1959	
Cavernario Galindo (hair)	Torbellino Blanco (hair)	Mexico City	EMLL 26th Anniversary Show	September 25, 1959	
Espanto I (hair)	Cavernario Galindo (hair)	Mexico City	Live event	February 9, 1962	
Benny Galant (hair)	Cavernario Galindo (hair)	Mexico City	EMLL 29th Anniversary Show	September 21, 1962	
Karloff Lagarde (hair)	Cavernario Galindo (hair)	Mexico City	Live event	December 3, 1965	
Cavernario Galindo (hair)	Gorilita Flores (hair)	Monterrey, Nuevo León	Live event	1992	

== Filmography ==
Galindo starred in several lucha films, usually in a supporting role or as a villain, but sometimes as a zombie or another fictitious character.

- Ruletera, La - 1987
- Leones del ring contra la Cosa Nostra, Los - 1974
- Leones del ring, Los - 1974
- Bestias del terror, Las - 1973
- Santo el enmascarado de plata y Blue Demon contra los monstruos - 1970
- Blue Demon contra cerebros infernales - 1968
- Isla de los dinosaurios, La - 1967
- Mujeres panteras, Las - 1967
- Lobas del ring, Las - 1965
- Fenómenos del futbol, Los - 1964
- Santo en el museo de cera - 1963
- Luchadoras contra el médico asesino, Las - 1963
- Señor Tormenta, El - 1963
- Tigres del ring, Los - 1960
- Última lucha, La - 1959
- The Magnificent Beast - 1953
