= Sugi Sito =

Mexican professional wrestler (1926-2000)

Personal information
- Born: Francisco Javier Mar Hernández; December 4, 1926 León, Guanajuato, Mexico
- Died: May 4, 2000 (aged 73)
- Children: La Briosa
- Relative: Black Cat (son-in-law)

Professional wrestling career
- Ring name(s): Sugi Sito; Dragon de Oro
- Trained by: Rolando Vera
- Debut: 1943
- Retired: 1980

Francisco Javier Mar Hernández (December 4, 1926 – May 4, 2000), known by the ring name "El Orgullo de Oriente" ("The pride of the Orient") Sugi Sito, was a Mexican professional wrestler and promoter. He saw success in Empresa Mexicana de Lucha Libre (EMLL) during the 1950s, where he was a two-time NWA World Middleweight Championship.

In the 1950s, Sito left Mexico and gained a measure of great success wrestling in the United States, especially the Houston, Texas area. In the early 1970s, Sito worked for Stu Hart's Stampede Wrestling as a tag team with Chin Lee and Tor Kamata, holding the NWA International Tag Team Championship three times. He later returned to Mexico where he became a wrestling promoter.

== Life and career ==
Francisco Mar was born in Guanajuato to a Mexican mother and Chinese father. He was trained by Rolando Vera for his professional wrestling career and made his debut in 1943. He adopted the "Japanese-sounding" ring name Sugi Sito to play off his East Asian ancestry, making him an instant rudo (heel) during World War II.

=== In Mexico ===
Sito's career highlights in Mexico came in the early part of the 1950s, as he was working for Empresa Mexicana de Lucha Libre (EMLL). On September 21, 1950 Sito defeated Tarzán López to win the NWA World Middleweight Championship, one of the most prestigious championships in Mexico at the time. Sito's first title reign lasted 368 days, ending when Enrique Llanes won the belt from him on September 24, 1951. Sito regained the Middleweight title in 1953 when he once again defeated López to win the title. This time he held it until January 1, 1954 when he was defeated by El Santo and lost the title.

=== United States ===
From 1954 and forward Sito travelled all over the United States and Canada to wrestle for various promotions. His first stop was in Texas where he worked for Southwest Sports, Inc. (the future World Class Championship Wrestling). Sito earned a reputation for having some of the hardest hand strikes in professional wrestling while working in Texas, a reputation that started when he accidentally fractured Danny McShain's skull during a match. He teamed up with another Mexican native in Rito Romero to win the NWA Texas Tag Team Championship from Ivan Kalmikoff and Karol Krauser. Due to sparse records from that time it is not known who defeated Sito and Romero for the titles. In the late 1960s Sito began working for Gulf Coast Championship Wrestling (GCCW) based out of Alabama. He was in a tag team with Tojo Yamamoto in 1968. In GCCW he began teaming with Mitsu Sito, his legit brother, defeating Rocket Monroe and Flash Monroe for the NWA Gulf Coast Tag Team Championship on February 21, 1969. The team only held the title for 5 days before being defeated by Bob Kelly and Ramon Perez.

=== Canada ===
Following his stint in the south eastern United States, Sito travelled north to Calgary, Alberta, Canada to work for Stu Hart's Stampede Wrestling. Over the course of the next two years Sito held the Calgary version of the NWA International Tag Team Championship three times, twice with Chin Lee and once with Tor Kamata.

== Personal life ==
Mar was part of a large wrestling family. His three brothers (Macario Mar [who wrestled as Huroki Sito and Mitsu Sito], Panchito Robles and Manuel Robles) were all professional wrestlers, as well as his son-in-law (El Mexicano), nephews (Black Cat, El Jabato and Pánico) and even his daughter who wrestles as La Briosa. The Mar family's latest generation includes his grandnephews Stigma, Skandalo and Rayo Metálico.

=== Death ===
Mar died on May 4, 2000.

== Championships and accomplishments ==
- Empresa Mexicana de Lucha Libre

- NWA World Middleweight Championship (2 times)

- Gulf Coast Championship Wrestling

- NWA Gulf Coast Tag Team Championship (1 time) – with Mitsu Sugi

- Southwest Sports, Inc.

- NWA Texas Tag Team Championship (1 time) - with Rito Romero

- Stampede Wrestling

- NWA International Tag Team Championship (Calgary version) (3 times) - with Chin Lee (2) and Tor Kamata (1)

== Luchas de Apuestas record ==
| Winner (wager) | Loser (wager) | Location | Event | Date | Notes |
|---|---|---|---|---|---|
| Dos Caras (mask) | Sugi Sito (hair) | N/A | Live event | N/A | |
| Torbellino Blanco (mask) | Sugi Sito (hair) | Mexico City | Live event | May 2, 1952 | |
