= NWA World Middleweight Championship =

Professional wrestling championship

- The championship belt

Details
- Promotion: Empresa Mexicana de Lucha Libre (1939–1990); Consejo Mundial de Lucha Libre (1990–1994, 2003–2010); Various (1994–2003)
- Date established: 1939^{[G]}
- Date retired: August 12, 2010

Other name
- World Middleweight Championship (1939–1952)^{[G]}
Statistics
- First champion: Gus Kallio^{[G]}
- Final champion: Averno
- Most reigns: René Guajardo (6 reigns)^{[G]}
- Longest reign: The Great Sasuke (1,487)
- Shortest reign: El Satánico (Less than 1 day)
- Heaviest champion: El Satánico (97 kilograms (214 lb)) (Note: The official weight of some of the champions have not been documented, making it possible that there was a heavier champion)
- Lightest champion: Averno (79 kilograms (174 lb)) (Note: The official weight of some of the champions have not been documented, making it possible that there was a lighter champion)

The NWA World Middleweight Championship was a professional wrestling championship in the National Wrestling Alliance (NWA) between 1939 and 2010. For most of its existence, it was defended in the Mexican lucha libre promotion Consejo Mundial de Lucha Libre (CMLL), who called it the Campeonato Mundial Peso Medio de NWA. As it is a professional wrestling championship, its holders were determined by promoters or promotions, not by athletic competition. The official middleweight limits in lucha libre are 82 kg (181 lb) to 87 kg (192 lb), but this rule is broken when convenient. (Note: One example of the weight limits being ignored was El Satánico holding the title, despite weighing 97 kg (214 lb).)

The championship was created as the "World Middleweight Championship" in early 1939, by Salvador Lutteroth, owner of Empresa Mexicana de Lucha Libre (EMLL).^{[G]} He awarded it to Gus Kallio, a five-time National Wrestling Association World Middleweight Champion, nicknamed "The King of the Middleweights" in the United States.^{[G]} When Octavio Gaona defeated Kallio on March 29, 1939, he won both middleweight championships. The National Wrestling Association title was retired in 1940, to give prominence to Lutteroth's creation. When EMLL joined the National Wrestling Alliance (NWA) in 1952, the belt was prefixed with "NWA".

In the late 1980s, EMLL withdrew from the NWA and in the early 1990s changed its name to Consejo Mundial de Lucha Libre (CMLL). CMLL retained ownership of three NWA-branded championships which originated in the promotion.^{[G]} The other two were the NWA World Welterweight Championship and the NWA World Light Heavyweight Championship. All continued to be billed as "Campeonatos de NWA". In 1994, Último Dragón bought the NWA World Middleweight Championship and its booking rights from CMLL.^{[G]} He chose to make himself first champion, and won it in a match with Corazón de León at a Wrestle and Romance (WAR) show on November 8, 1994, in Korakuen Hall. At that point he began promoting the title exclusively in Japan, holding it himself until vacating it in 1998. During his run with the championship Último Dragón also won the J-Crown championships, eight unified lightweight championships, but the NWA World Middleweight Championship was never integrated into the J-Crown. In 2003, after ending The Great Sasuke's long reign, Dragón signed with World Wrestling Entertainment (WWE) and returned the championship to CMLL who he worked with off and on until that point. Averno defeated Zumbido to win the vacant title in its first CMLL match since 1994.

In March 2010, Blue Demon Jr., the president of NWA Mexico the local representative of the National Wrestling Alliance, demanded that CMLL (a non-member of NWA Mexico) cease promoting the NWA-branded championships, declaring that all three championships had been vacated as far as the NWA was concerned. NWA Mexico had already tried to reclaim CMLL's three NWA-branded titles on a previous occasion. CMLL ignored both requests; the NWA Welterweight Champion, Mephisto, commented instead that "the titles belong to CMLL", thus the NWA could not vacate them. On August 12, 2010, CMLL unveiled the new NWA World Historic Middleweight Championship to replace the original championship, which it conceded to NWA Mexico.

Since 1939 45 wrestlers have shared 84 NWA Middleweight Championship reigns. René Guajardo held the championship a record six times. Tarzán López' four reigns totalled 3,007 days, the longest of any champion. The Great Sasuke had the longest single reign, at 1,548 days. Emilio Charles, Jr. had the shortest reign at 11 days.

== Title history ==
Key
No.	Overall reign number
Reign	Reign number for the specific champion
Days	Number of days held
N/A	Unknown information
(NLT)	Championship change took place "no later than" the date listed
†	Championship change is unrecognized by the promotion

No.	Champion	Championship change			Reign statistics		Notes	Ref.
No.	Champion	Date	Event	Location	Reign	Days	Notes	Ref.
Empresa Mexicana de la Lucha Libre (EMLL)
1	Gus Kallio	N/A	Live event	N/A	1	(Note: The length of Gus Kallio's title reign is too uncertain to calculate.)	Gus Kallio was awarded the championship in late 1938 or early 1939 due to the fact that he already held the World Middleweight Championship in the United States.	^{[G]}
2	Octavio Gaona	February 19, 1939	Live event	Mexico City	1	350	Octavio Gaona won the championship to permanently establish it as an EMLL title. He also won Kallio's other World Middleweight Championship.	^{[G]}
3	Tarzán López	February 4, 1940	Live event	Mexico City	1	681	López won both versions of the World Middleweight Championship. After this title change only the Mexican version remained active.	^{[G]}
4	Black Guzmán	December 16, 1941	Live event	Mexico City	1	57		^{[G]}
5	Tarzán López	February 11, 1942	Live event	Mexico City	2	1,465		^{[G]}
6	Gory Guerrero	February 15, 1946	Live event	Mexico City	1	790		^{[G]}
7	Mike Kelly	April 12, 1948	Live event	Mexico City	1	411		^{[G]}
8	Tarzán López	May 28, 1949	Live event	N/A	3	481		^{[G]}
9	Sugi Sito	September 21, 1950	EMLL 17th Anniversary Show	Mexico City	1	368		^{[G]}
10	Enrique Llanes	September 24, 1951	EMLL 18th Anniversary Show	Mexico City	1	132		^{[G]}
—	Vacated	February 3, 1952	—	—	—	—	EMLL vacated the championship for undocumented reasons.	^{[G]}
11	Tarzán López	June 13, 1952	Live event	Mexico City	4	372	Tarzán López defeated Sugi Sito in a tournament final to win the vacant title.	^{[G]}
National Wrestling Alliance (NWA) / Empresa Mexicana de la Lucha Libre (EMLL)
12	Sugi Sito	June 20, 1953	Live event	Mexico City	2	195		^{[G]}
13	Santo	January 1, 1954	Live event	Mexico City	1	1,021		^{[G]}
14	Rolando Vera	October 19, 1956	Live event	Monterrey, Nuevo León	1	1,455		^{[G]}
15	René Guajardo	October 13, 1960	Live event	Monterrey, Nuevo León	1	415		^{[G]}
16	Antonio Posa	December 2, 1961	Live event	Mexico City	1	140		^{[G]}
17	René Guajardo	April 18, 1962	Live event	Mexico City	2	190		^{[G]}
18	Rayo de Jalisco	October 25, 1962	Live event	Mexico City	1	583		^{[G]}
19	Benny Galant	May 30, 1964	Live event	Mexico City	1	118		^{[G]}
20	Rayo de Jalisco	September 25, 1964	EMLL 31st Anniversary Show	Mexico City	2	196		^{[G]}
21	René Guajardo	April 9, 1965	Live event	Mexico City	3	400		^{[G]}
22	Jerry London	May 14, 1966	Live event	Mexico City	1	48		^{[G]}
23	René Guajardo	July 1, 1966	Live event	Monterrey, Nuevo León	4	253		^{[G]}
24	Ray Mendoza	March 10, 1967	Live event	Mexico City	1	141		^{[G]}
—	Vacated	May 29, 1967	—	—	—	—	EMLL vacated the championship for undocumented reasons.	^{[G]}
25	René Guajardo	July 29, 1967	Live event	N/A	5	629	Guajardo won a decision match for the vacant title.	^{[G]}
26	El Santo	December 13, 1968	Super Viernes	Mexico City	2	133		^{[G]}
26	Rayo de Jalisco	April 18, 1969	13. Aniversario de Arena México	Mexico City	3	119		^{[G]}
27	El Solitario	August 15, 1969	EMLL 36th Anniversary Show	Mexico City	1	378		^{[G]}
28	Mashio Koma	June 28, 1970	Live event	Mexico City	1	161		^{[G]}
29	Aníbal	December 6, 1970	Live event	Mexico City	1	845		^{[G]}
30	René Guajardo	March 30, 1973	Live event	Mexico City	6	474		^{[G]}
—	Vacated	July 17, 1974	—	—	—	—	EMLL vacated the championship for undocumented reasons.	^{[G]}
31	Aníbal	September 20, 1974	EMLL 41st Anniversary Show	Mexico City	2	(Note: The exact date on which Aníbal vacated the championship during his second reign is unknown, which means the title reign lasted between 223 and 253 days.)	Aníbal defeated El Cobarde in a decision match to win the title.	^{[G]}
—	Vacated	May 1975	—	—	—	—	The championship was vacated when Aníbal left EMLL to work for the Universal Wrestling Association.	^{[G]}
32	Perro Aguayo	July 4, 1975	Live event	Mexico City	1	476	Perro Aguayo won a tournament to claim the vacant championship.	^{[G]}
33	El Faraón	October 22, 1976	Live event	Mexico City	1	140		^{[G]}
34	Perro Aguayo	March 11, 1977	Live event	Mexico City	2	114		^{[G]}
35	Ringo Mendoza	July 3, 1977	Live event	Guadalajara, Jalisco	1	101		^{[G]}
36	Joe Plardy	October 12, 1977	Live event	Acapulco, Guerrero	1	44		^{[G]}
37	El Faraón	November 25, 1977	Live event	Mexico City	2	84		^{[G]}
38	Ringo Mendoza	February 17, 1978	Live event	Los Angeles, California	2	51		^{[G]}
39	Perro Aguayo	April 9, 1978	Live event	Guadalajara, Jalisco	3	75		^{[G]}
40	Ringo Mendoza	June 23, 1978	Live event	Mexico City	3	51		^{[G]}
41	Tony Salazar	August 13, 1978	Live event	Mexico City	1	174		^{[G]}
42	Ringo Mendoza	February 3, 1979	Live event	Acapulco, Guerrero	4	218		^{[G]}
43	Satoru Sayama	September 9, 1979	Live event	Guadalajara, Jalisco	1	201		^{[G]}
44	El Satánico	March 28, 1980	Live event	Mexico City	1	20		^{[G]}
45	Cachorro Mendoza	April 17, 1980	Live event	Monterrey, Nuevo León	1	59		^{[G]}
46	Sangre Chicana	June 15, 1980	Live event	Monterrey, Nuevo León	1	217		^{[G]}
47	Tony Salazar	January 18, 1981	Live event	Monterrey, Nuevo León	1	54		^{[G]}
48	Sangre Chicana	March 13, 1981	Live event	Mexico City	2	21		^{[G]}
49	Ringo Mendoza	April 3, 1981	Live event	Mexico City	5	240		^{[G]}
50	El Faraón	November 29, 1981	Live event	Guadalajara, Jalisco	3	124		^{[G]}
51	César Curiel	April 2, 1982	Live event	Mexico City	1	206		^{[G]}
52	El Satánico	October 25, 1982	Live event	Mexico City	2	0		^{[G]}
53	El Jalisco	October 25, 1982	Live event	Guadalajara, Jalisco	1	139		^{[G]}
54	El Satánico	March 13, 1983	Live event	N/A	3	82		^{[G]}
55	Lizmark	June 3, 1983	Live event	Mexico City	1	182		^{[G]}
56	El Satánico	December 2, 1983	Live event	Mexico City	4	250		^{[G]}
57	Gran Cochisse	August 8, 1984	Live event	Mexico City	1	37		^{[G]}
58	El Satánico	September 14, 1984	Live event	Mexico City	5	16		^{[G]}
59	Gran Cochisse	September 30, 1984	Live event	Guadalajara, Jalisco	2	49		^{[G]}
60	Gran Hamada	November 18, 1984	Live event	Mexico City	1	138		^{[G]}
61	La Fiera	April 5, 1985	Live event	Mexico City	1	106		^{[G]}
62	Chamaco Valaguez	July 20, 1985	Live event	Puebla, Puebla	1	302		^{[G]}
63	Gran Cochisse	May 18, 1986	Live event	N/A	3	152		^{[G]}
64	Kung Fu	October 17, 1986	Live event	Mexico City	1	273		^{[G]}
Empresa Mexicana de la Lucha Libre (EMLL)
65	El Dandy	July 17, 1987	Live event	Mexico City	1	81		^{[G]}
66	Kung Fu	October 6, 1987	Live event	Mexico City	2	248		^{[G]}
67	Atlantis	June 10, 1988	Live event	Mexico City	1	37		^{[G]}
68	Emilio Charles Jr.	July 17, 1988	Live event	Mexico City	1	11		^{[G]}
69	Atlantis	July 28, 1988	Live event	Mexico City	2	15		^{[G]}
70	Emilio Charles Jr.	August 12, 1988	Live event	Mexico City	2	259		^{[G]}
71	Ángel Azteca	April 28, 1989	Live event	Mexico City	1	399		^{[G]}
72	El Dandy	June 1, 1990	Live event	Mexico City	2	61		^{[G]}
73	Atlantis	August 1, 1990	Live event	Acapulco, Guerrero	3	945		^{[G]}
Consejo Mundial de Lucha Libre (CMLL)
74	Mano Negra	March 3, 1993	Live event	Acapulco, Guerrero	1	81		^{[G]}
75	Oro	May 23, 1993	Live event	N/A	1	41		^{[G]}
76	Mano Negra	July 3, 1993	Live event	Puebla, Puebla	2	155		^{[G]}
77	Corazón de León	December 4, 1993	Live event	Mexico City	1	339		^{[G]}
78	Último Dragón	November 8, 1994	WAR WAR-ISM 1994	Tokyo, Japan	1	(Note: The exact date on which Último Dragon vacated the championship during his first reign is unknown, which means the title reign lasted between 1,150 and 1,514 days.)	Match promoted by WAR. Último Dragón stops defending the title around 1997.	^{[G]}
—	Vacated	1998	—	—	—	—	Último Dragón was forced to vacate the championship due to an arm injury.	^{[G]}
79	The Great Sasuke	February 7, 1999	Toryumon King of Dragon 1999	Yokohama, Japan	1	1,546	Great Sasuke defeated Tokyo Magnum in tournament final to win the championship.	^{[G]}
80	Último Dragón	May 3, 2003	Live event	Sendai, Miyagi, Japan	2	(Note: The exact date on which Último Dragon vacated the championship during his second reign is unknown, which means the title reign lasted between 1 and 28 days.)		
—	Vacated	May 2003	—	—	—	—	The championship was vacated when Último Dragon began to work for World Wrestling Entertainment.	^{[G]}
81	Averno	September 3, 2004	Live event	Mexico City	1	120	Averno defeated Zumbido in a decision match for the vacant championship.	
82	Místico	January 1, 2005	Super Viernes	Mexico City	1	496		
83	Black Warrior	May 12, 2006	Super Viernes	Mexico City	1	474		
84	Místico	April 29, 2007	N/A	Mexico City	2	215		
85	Averno	November 30, 2007	Super Viernes	Mexico City	2	986	CMLL replaced the championship with the NWA World Historic Middleweight Championship on August 12, 2010.	
—	Deactivated	August 12, 2010	—	—	—	—	The championship was retired when CMLL returned it to NWA.	

== Reigns by combined length ==
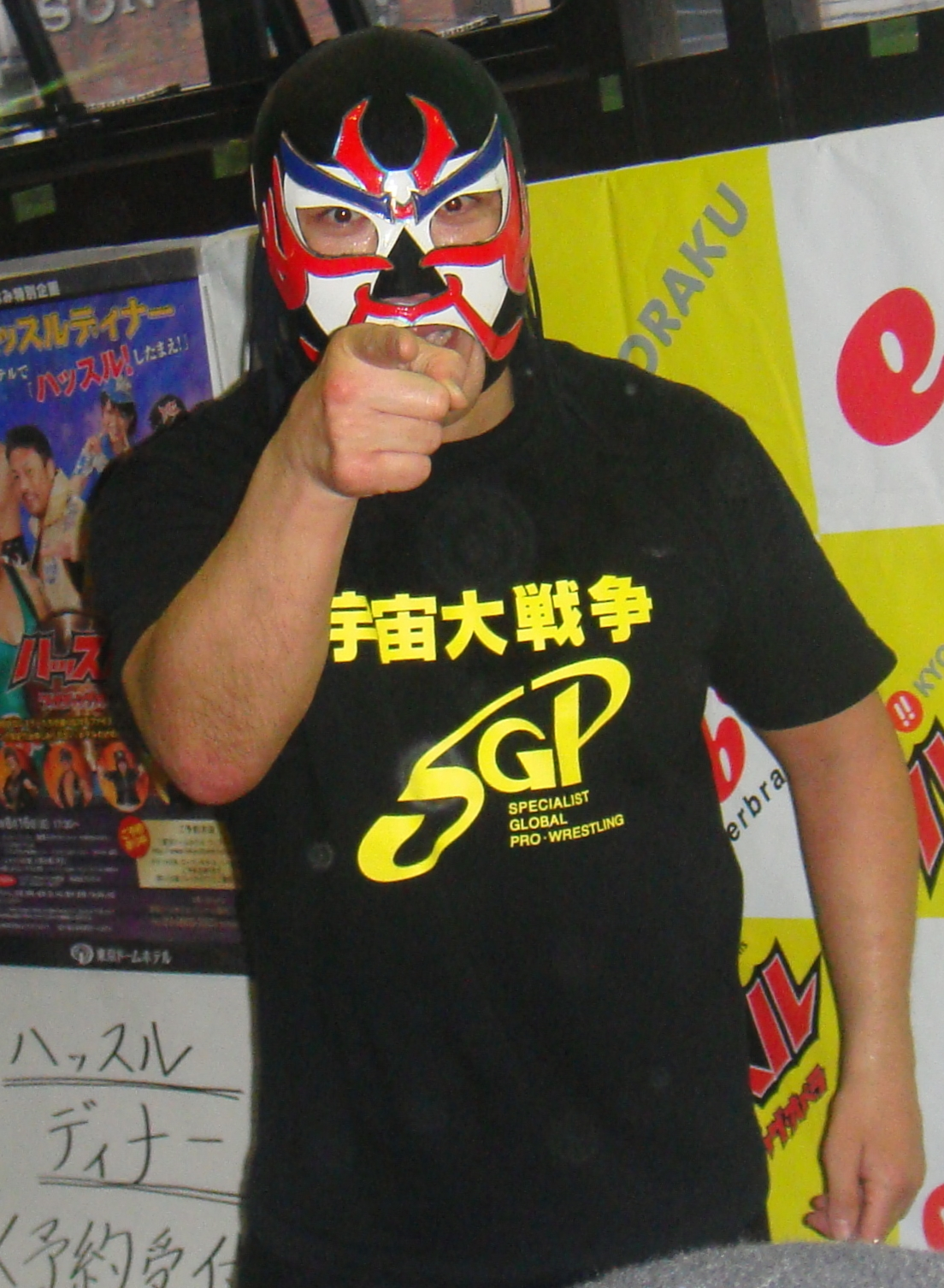
The Great Sasuke, who had the longest individual reign of any NWA World Middleweight Champion.

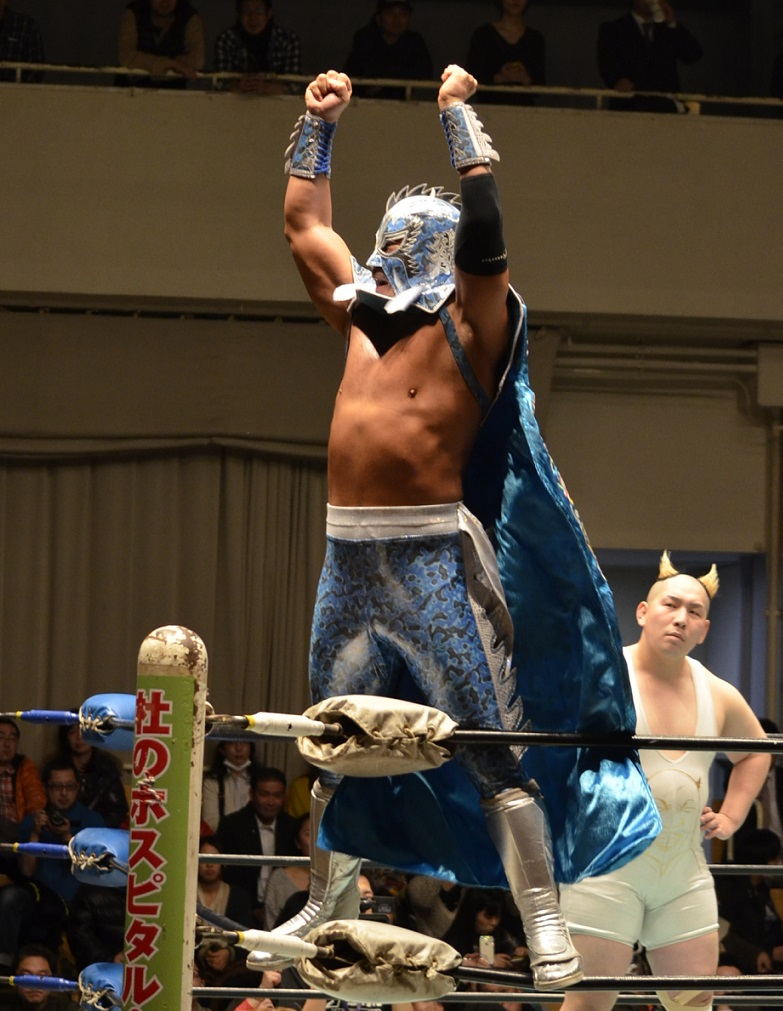
Último Dragón, brought the championship to Japan

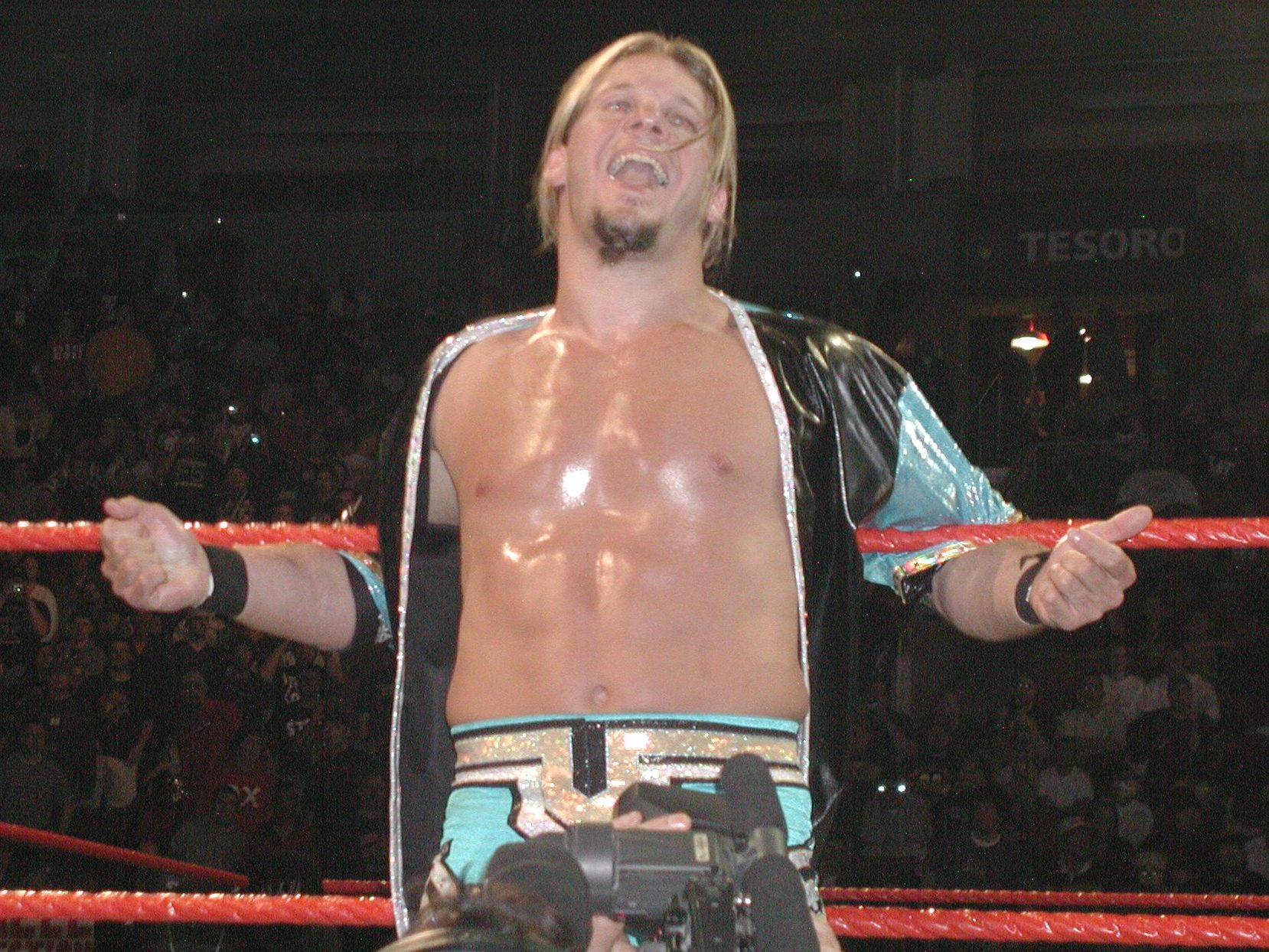
Chris Jericho, as Corazón de León, lost the championship in Japan to signal the transition from CMLL's control.

Key

Symbol	Meaning
¤	The exact length of at least one title reign is uncertain, so the shortest possible length is used.

Rank	Wrestler	No. of reigns	Combined days	Ref(s).
1	Tarzán López	4	2,999	^{[G]}
2	René Guajardo	6	1,937¤ (Note: The exact date on which René Guajardo vacated the championship during his sixth reign is unknown, which means the title reign lasted between 277 and 538 days.)	^{[G]}
3	Great Sasuke	1	1,487	^{[G]}
4	Rolando Vera	1	1,455	^{[G]}
5	Último Dragón	2	1,177¤	^{[G]}
6	Aníbal	2	1,122¤	^{[G]}
7	Averno	2	1,106	
8	El Santo	2	1,021	^{[G]}
9	Atlantis	3	997	^{[G]}
10	Rayo de Jalisco	3	898	^{[G]}
11	Gory Guerrero	1	790	^{[G]}
12	Místico	2	711	
13	Perro Aguayo	3	665	^{[G]}
14	Ringo Mendoza	5	662	^{[G]}
15	Sugi Sito	2	564	^{[G]}
16	Kung Fu	2	521	^{[G]}
17	Black Warrior	1	474	
18	Mike Kelly	1	411	^{[G]}
19	Ángel Azteca	1	400	^{[G]}
20	El Satánico	5	388	^{[G]}
21	El Solitario	1	378	^{[G]}
22	Octavio Gaona	1	350	^{[G]}
23	El Faraón	3	348	^{[G]}
24	Corazón de León	1	339	^{[G]}
25	Chamaco Valaguez	1	302	^{[G]}
26	Emilio Charles Jr.	2	270	^{[G]}
27	Gran Cochisse	3	238	^{[G]}
28	Sangre Chicana	2	237	^{[G]}
29	Mano Negra	2	236	^{[G]}
30	Tony Salazar	2	228	^{[G]}
31	César Curiel	1	206	^{[G]}
32	Satoru Sayama	1	201	^{[G]}
33	Lizmark	1	182	^{[G]}
34	Mashio Koma	1	161	^{[G]}
35	El Dandy	2	141	^{[G]}
36	Antonio Posa	1	140	^{[G]}
37	El Jalisco	1	139	^{[G]}
38	Gran Hamada	1	138	^{[G]}
39	Enrique Llanes	1	132	^{[G]}
40	Benny Galant	1	118	^{[G]}
41	La Fiera	1	106	^{[G]}
42	Cachorro Mendoza	1	59	^{[G]}
43	Black Guzmán	1	57	^{[G]}
44	Ray Mendoza	1	51¤ (Note: The exact date on which Ray Mendoza vacated the championship is unknown, which means the title reign lasted between 51 and 81 days.)	^{[G]}
45	Jerry London	1	48	^{[G]}
46	Joe Plardy	1	44	^{[G]}
47	Oro	1	41	^{[G]}
48	Gus Kallio	1	¤	^{[G]}

== See also ==
- List of National Wrestling Alliance championships
