= Black Shadow (wrestler) =

Mexican professional wrestler

Personal information
- Born: Alejandro Cruz Ortiz; May 3, 1921 León, Guanajuato, Mexico
- Died: March 8, 2007 (aged 85) Mexico City, Mexico

Professional wrestling career
- Ring name(s): Alejandro Cruz; Black Shadow; Jungla Cruz
- Trained by: Manuel Miranda; El Enfermero
- Debut: June 21, 1942
- Retired: 1981

Alejandro Cruz Ortiz (May 3, 1921 – March 8, 2007) was a Mexican professional wrestler, known worldwide as Black Shadow (Spanish: Sombras). Cruz's mask vs. mask match against El Santo in 1952 is generally considered one of the most important matches in the history of Lucha Libre. Cruz often teamed with Blue Demon, working as a tag team called "Los Hermanos Shadow" (the Shadow Brothers), even though the two were not related. He was nicknamed El Hombre de Goma, translated as The Rubber Man, due to his elasticity and flexibility in the ring.

== Biography ==
Cruz's original ambition was to be a musician but because he lacked the talent to earn a living from it he turned to professional wrestling. He had been a lifelong fan, and began training for a professional wrestling career in 1941.

=== Professional wrestling career ===
Cruz made his professional debut on June 21, 1942, against Rito Romero losing his debut match. Initially he was billed as "Jungla" Cruz, named after a popular character from the funny papers but he did not like the name the promoters had forced on him. After making his debut Cruz realized that he needed to perform regularly in order to improve, thus he decided to move to Monterrey which at the time was one of the main cities for wrestling in Mexico. In Monterrey he befriended another young wrestler trying to break into the business, Blue Demon. The two struck up a friendship and soon after began teaming together on a regular basis. After working under his real name for a while, Cruz decided that he needed a different image, and came up with the ring persona "Black Shadow" and a black mask with white trim around the eye, mouth and nose openings. The new image was a hit and masked duo of Blue Demon and Black Shadow became known as "Los Hermanos Shadow" (Spanish for "the shadow brothers") despite not being related. Los Hermanos Shadow quickly became very popular and were at one point the main "tecnico" (good guy) team. In the mid-1950s Los Hermanos Shadow began a decade long rivalry with the top Rudo (villain) team of El Santo and Gory Guerrero, known as "La Pareja Atómica". After selling out arenas all around Mexico for their tag team matches El Santo and Black Shadow started to work singles matches against each other.

=== Losing the mask ===
The rivalry between Black Shadow and El Santo culminated in a Luchas de Apuestas, or mask vs. mask match, on November 7, 1952. The 70 minute match that is still heralded today as one of the most famous in Latin American history. It helped popularize the concept with mask matches still the biggest draws in Lucha Libre to the modern day. Subsequently Santo clashed with Blue Demon but it was the match against Black Shadow that stands out as one of the defining matches in Lucha Libre history. The match was one of the main reasons wrestling promoter Salvador Lutteroth started to build Arena Mexico as so many people had been unable to get tickets for the show. The match was so popular that it caused El Santo to turn tecnico and was the starting point of a wrestling and movie career that made El Santo Mexico's most beloved wrestler.

While some wrestlers lose popularity after unmasking, Black Shadow thrived after losing his mask. His innovative, high-flying style that incorporated moves off the top rope was something not many wrestlers used at the time and ensured that he worked in the main event throughout the 1950s and 1960s. In 1981 Cruz was unable to get his wrestling license renewed due to ailing health, forcing him to retire after almost 40 years in the business. After his retirement Cruz withdrew from the spotlight, rarely talking about his career. In 2001 Black Shadow was inducted in the Wrestling Observer Newsletter Hall of Fame for his contributions to professional wrestling.

=== Filmography ===
Cruz also appeared in numerous Mexican wrestling films with Santo, mostly billed as "Black Shadow" in the credits. In two Blue Demon films, (Blue Demon en Noche de muerte and Santo y Blue Demon contra los monstruos) the Black Shadow played an evil duplicate (or clone) of Blue Demon, dressed in the Blue Demon costume while posing as the "real" Blue Demon.

== Death ==
Alejandro Cruz died on March 8, 2007, age 85, in Mexico City after suffering from pneumonia.

== Legacy ==
The name "Black Shadow" was used by an African French heel in France's FFCP in the 1970s/1980s.

== Championships and accomplishments ==
- Empresa Mexicana de Lucha Libre
  - Mexican National Lightweight Championship (1 time)
  - Mexican National Tag Team Championship (1 time) – with Blue Demon
  - Occidente Welterweight Championship (2 times)
  - Homenaje a Dos Leyendas honoree (2008)
- Wrestling Observer Newsletter
  - Wrestling Observer Newsletter Hall of Fame (Class of 2001)

== Luchas de Apuestas record ==
Winner (wager)	Loser (wager)	Location	Event	Date	Notes
La Bestia Roja (mask)	Jungla Cruz (mask)	Guadalajara, Jalisco	Live event	December 17, 1944	
Black Shadow (mask)	El Gladiador (hair)	Mexico City	Live event	Unknown	
El Santo (mask)	Black Shadow (mask)	Mexico City	Live event	November 7, 1952	
Dorrel Dixon (hair)	Black Shadow (hair)	Mexico City	Live event	Unknown	
Black Shadow (hair)	Tony Borne (hair)	Mexico City	Live event	October 30, 1958	
Black Shadow (hair)	Jorge Allende (hair)	Guatemala	Live event	August 10, 1962	
René Guajardo (hair)	Black Shadow (hair)	Mexico City	Live event	April 30, 1965	
Black Shadow (hair)	Espanto II (hair)	Monterrey, Nuevo León	Live event	November 14, 1965	
Black Shadow (hair)	Bobby Nichols (hair)	Mexico City	Live event	August 4, 1967	
El Ángel Exterminador (mask)	Black Shadow (hair)	Mexico City	Live event	August 25, 1967	
Black Shadow and Ray Mendoza (hair)	Los Hippies (hair) (Renato Torres and El Vikingo)	Mexico City	13. Aniversario de Arena México	April 18, 1968	
Black Shadow (hair)	Dorrel Dixon (hair)	Mexico City	Live event	June 11, 1968	
