= Gory Guerrero =

Mexican-American professional wrestler (1921–1981)

Personal information
- Born: Salvador Guerrero Quesada; January 11, 1921 Ray, Arizona, U.S.
- Died: April 18, 1990 (aged 69) El Paso, Texas, U.S.
- Cause of death: Cirrhosis due to hepatitis
- Family: Guerrero

Professional wrestling career
- Ring name(s): José Martínez; Gory Guerrero
- Billed height: 5 ft 9 in (175 cm)
- Billed weight: 210 lb (95 kg)
- Trained by: Diablo Velasco; Indio Mejía
- Debut: September 14, 1937
- Retired: 1985

Salvador Guerrero Quesada (January 11, 1921 – April 18, 1990), better known as Gory Guerrero, was an American and Mexican professional wrestler, promoter, and booker. He was a major star of Lucha Libre during his time, and worked primarily in Empresa Mexicana de la Lucha Libre (EMLL) between the 1940s and 1960s, as well as for the National Wrestling Alliance (NWA) in the United States. He was the patriarch of the Guerrero wrestling family.

== Early life ==
Guerrero was born in Ray, Arizona to a family of migrant workers. He attended school in the United States until the age of nine when his mother died. His family moved to Mexico, and Guerrero's father used his English-language skills to work as an interpreter in Guadalajara.

== Professional wrestling career ==
In Mexico, Guerrero joined a gym with the intention to learn to box, but instead learned lucha libre from Diablo Velasco and El Indio Mejía. He wrestled his first professional wrestling match on September 14, 1937, jobbing to El Rojo. He began his career in Mexico working under the ring name Joe Morgan, but later changed his name to Gory Guerrero—a reference to his bloody matches.

He made his debut for the Mexico City promotion Empresa Mexicana de la Lucha Libre (EMLL) in 1943 and was named "Rookie of the Year" later that year. In 1945, he briefly held the Mexican National Welterweight Championship. Several months later, he won the Mexican National Middleweight Championship, which he held for approximately one year.

Guerrero and his brothers also feuded with Cavernario Galindo and his brothers. In the late 1940s, Guerrero began tag teaming with El Santo as the undefeated La Pareja Atómica (The Atomic Pair). Guerrero also appeared in some of El Santo's films. He also feuded with Enrique Llanes and his tag team partner Tarzán López. He defeated Lopez for the NWA Middleweight title. In 1954, he wrestled a championship match against NWA World Heavyweight Champion Lou Thesz but did not win the title.

Guerrero broke away from EMLL in 1966 after refusing to drop the NWA World Light Heavyweight Championship to Ray Mendoza. He worked as an independent in the mid-1960s. He also began to branch out into booking and training with Dory Funk Sr. In addition, he helped run shows in NWA Hollywood Wrestling for two years, and later he booked shows for World Class Championship Wrestling. With age his in-ring performing decreased until his ultimate retirement in the 1980s. Guerrero is credited with the invention of La de a Caballo (Camel Clutch) and the Gory Special, a type of backbreaker stretch hold which has been modified into a facebuster move (Gory Bomb), a piledriver (Barry White Driver), a powerbomb (Stu Hart Special), a reverse STO (The Deal) or a neckbreaker/backbreaker (Widow's Peak).

== Personal life and death ==
Guerrero's wife Herlinda was the sister of wrestler Enrique Llanes. They married in 1947. They had six children: four sons Chavo, Mando, Héctor, Eddie, and two daughters, Maria and Linda. His grandson, Chavo Guerrero Jr. is also a wrestler. After retiring from active wrestling, Guerrero sold auto insurance. Guerrero would also open his home to aspiring wrestlers, training them in the backyard in an old ring.

=== Death ===
In early April 1990, Guerrero's liver failed and he developed cirrhosis due to hepatitis. Two weeks later on April 18, he died at the age of 69.

== Championships and accomplishments ==
- Empresa Mexicana de la Lucha Libre
  - Mexican National Middleweight Championship (1 time)
  - Mexican National Welterweight Championship (1 time)
  - NWA World Light Heavyweight Championship (2 times)^{1}
  - NWA World Welterweight Championship (1 time)^{2}
  - World Middleweight Championship (1 time)^{3}
  - Rookie of the Year (1943)
- NWA Hollywood Wrestling
  - NWA Americas Tag Team Championship (1 time) – with Chavo Guerrero Sr.
- Pacific Northwest Wrestling
  - NWA Pacific Northwest Tag Team Championship (1 time) – with Luigi Macera
- Professional Wrestling Hall of Fame
  - Class of 2019
- Southwest Championship Wrestling
  - SCW Southwest Junior Heavyweight Championship (1 time)
- Southwest Sports, Inc.
  - NWA Texas Tag Team Championship (1 time) – with Cyclone Anaya
- Western States Sports
  - NWA World Tag Team Championship (Amarillo version) (6 times) – with Gordo Chihuahua (1), Luis Hernandez (2), Pancho Lopez (1), Ricky Romero (1) and Sonny Myers (1)
- Wrestling Observer Newsletter
  - Wrestling Observer Newsletter Hall of Fame (Class of 1996)

=== Notes ===
^{1}The NWA World Light Heavyweight Championship is no longer a championship that is sanctioned or acknowledge by the National Wrestling Alliance as a world title.
^{2}The NWA World Welterweight Championship is no longer sanctioned or recognized by the NWA as a world title.
^{3}This title would later be recognized by the NWA, though Guerrero's reign with it occurred prior to the formation of the National Wrestling Alliance. The NWA World Middleweight Championship is also currently not sanctioned or recognized by the NWA as a world title.

== Luchas de Apuestas record ==
Winner (wager)	Loser (wager)	Location	Event	Date	Notes
Gory Guerrero (hair)	The Red Mistery (mask)	Mexico City	Live event	April 27, 1945	
