= 1975 in professional wrestling =

1975 in professional wrestling describes the year's events in the world of professional wrestling.

== List of notable promotions ==
These promotions held notable shows in 1975.

Promotion Name	Abbreviation
All Japan Pro Wrestling	AJPW
Empresa Mexicana de Lucha Libre	EMLL
International Wrestling Enterprise	IWE
New Japan Pro Wrestling	NJPW
Universal Wrestling Association	UWA

== Calendar of notable shows ==
Date	Promotion(s)	Event	Location	Main Event
January 26	UWA	UWA Debut Show	Mexico City, Mexico	Aníbal (c) defeated René Guajardo in a singles match for the NWA World Middleweight Championship
May 16	NJPW	World League	Tokyo, Japan	Antonio Inoki defeated Killer Karl Krupp
May 24	EMLL	19. Aniversario de Arena México	Mexico City, Mexico	Perro Aguayo defeated Ray Mendoza in a best two-out-of-three falls Lucha de Apuestas hair vs. hair match
September 19	EMLL	EMLL 42nd Anniversary Show (1)	Mexico City, Mexico	Los Gemelo Diablos (I and II) defeated Coloso Colosetti and Rubi Rubalcava in a best two out-of-three-falls Lucha de Apuesta hair vs. hair match
September 26	EMLL	EMLL 42nd Anniversary Show (2)	Mexico City, Mexico	Perro Aguayo (c) defeated El Santo in a best two-out-of-three falls match for the NWA World Middleweight Championship
October 3	EMLL	EMLL 42nd Anniversary Show (3)	Mexico City, Mexico	El Santo defeated Perro Aguayo in a best two-out-of-three falls Lucha de Apuesta Mask vs. Hair match
December 5	EMLL	Juicio Final	Mexico City, Mexico	Enrique Vera defeated Alfonso Dantés in a Lucha de Apuestas, hair Vs. mask Vs. hair match; also in the match: El Halcón
December 11	AJPW / IWE / JWA	Rikidozan Memorial Show	Tokyo	Giant Baba & The Destroyer defeated Dory Funk, Jr. & Jumbo Tsuruta
(c) – denotes defending champion(s)

== Notable events ==
- promoter Francisco Flores and wrestler Ray Mendoza break away from Empresa Mexicana de Lucha Libre and, along with investor Benjamin Mora Jr., create the Universal Wrestling Association (UWA).
- October 8 - Wide World Wrestling premiered on television as a companion program to Mid-Atlantic Championship Wrestling
- November 5 - NBC's The Tomorrow Show devotes the night's program to discussion of professional wrestling, including in-ring demonstrations. Participants include Bill Apter, Donna Christanello, Superstar Billy Graham, Dick Lane, Vince McMahon and Bruno Sammartino
- November 18 - Louis Cerdan and Tony Parisi defeat The Blackjacks to become the new WWWF Tag Team Champions.

== Accomplishments and tournaments ==
=== AJW ===
Accomplishment	Winner	Date won	Notes
Rookie of the Year Decision Tournament	Yukari Wrench		
World League	Jumbo Miyamoto		

=== JCP ===
Accomplishment	Winner	Date won	Notes
NWA United States Championship Tournament	Terry Funk	November 9	

== Awards and honors ==
=== Pro Wrestling Illustrated ===
Category	Winner
PWI Wrestler of the Year	Mr. Wrestling II
PWI Tag Team of the Year	Gene and Ole Anderson
PWI Match of the Year	Bruno Sammartino vs. Spiros Arion
PWI Most Popular Wrestler of the Year	Mil Máscaras
PWI Most Hated Wrestler of the Year	Greg Valentine
PWI Most Inspirational Wrestler of the Year	Mike McCord
PWI Rookie of the Year	Ric Flair
PWI Woman of the Year	Ann Casey
PWI Midget Wrestler of the Year	Sky Low Low
PWI Manager of the Year	George Cannon

== Championship changes ==
=== EMLL ===
NWA World Light Heavyweight Championship
incoming champion – Dr. Wagner
Date	Winner	Event/Show	Note(s)
No title changes

NWA World Middleweight Championship
Incoming champion – Aníbal
Date	Winner	Event/Show	Note(s)
May	Vacant	EMLL show	
July 4	Perro Aguayo	EMLL show	

NWA World Welterweight Championship
Incoming champion – Mano Negra
Date	Winner	Event/Show	Note(s)
Uncertain	Vacant	N/A	
May 1	Fishman	EMLL show	
May 25	Blue Demon	EMLL show	

Mexican National Heavyweight Championship
Incoming champion - Enrique Vera
Date	Winner	Event/Show	Note(s)
March 12	Raul Reyes	EMLL show	
September 27	El Halcon	EMLL show	

Mexican National Middleweight Championship
Incoming champion - Ringo Mendoza
No title changes

Mexican National Lightweight Championship
Incoming champion – Tauro
Date	Winner	Event/Show	Note(s)
January 18	Dardo Aguilar	EMLL show	
June 1	Tauro	EMLL show	

Mexican National Light Heavyweight Championship
Incoming champion – Alfonso Dantes
No title changes

Mexican National Welterweight Championship
Incoming champion – Fishman
Date	Winner	Event/Show	Note(s)
May 3	Vacant	EMLL show	
October 12	Fishman	EMLL show	

Mexican National Women's Championship
Incoming champion – Uncertain
No title changes

=== NWA ===
NWA Worlds Heavyweight Championship
Incoming champion – Jack Brisco
Date	Winner	Event/Show	Note(s)
December 10	Terry Funk	House show	

== Births ==
- Date of birth uncertain:
  - Damian Steele (died in 2009)
- January 1 - Kid Romeo
- January 23 - Tito Ortiz
- January 28 - Shark Boy
- January 30 – Dark Ozz
- February 8 – Shane Shamrock (d. 1998)
- February 14 - Hiroko Suzuki
- February 18 - Charly Manson
- February 22 - Andy Anderson
- March 15 - Lobo
- March 17 – Test (d. 2009)
- April 12 – Cibernético
- April 14 – Lita
- April 15 - Paul E. Normous (d. 2009)
- April 25 - BLK Jeez
- May 6 - Germán Figueroa
- May 8 – Truth Martini
- May 12 - Ricky Ortiz
- May 15:
  - La Parkita (d. 2009)
  - Espectrito II (d. 2009)
- May 17 – Alex Wright
- May 22 – Traci Brooks
- June 2 – Chessman
- June 12 - Bryan Alvarez
- June 18
  - Darren Wyse
  - Bam Neely
- July 3 - Johnny Swinger
- July 9 – Shelton Benjamin
- July 15 – Cherry
- July 17 :
  - Daffney (died in 2021)
  - UltraMantis Black
  - Yuki Kondo
- July 23 – Drago
- July 24 – Torrie Wilson
- July 25 – El Zorro
- August 2 - Blitzkrieg
- August 17 - Palmer Canon
- August 31 - Takahiro Suwa
- September 16 - Matt Stryker
- September 20 - Joel Gertner
- September 25 - Shuji Ishikawa
- October 7 – Rhyno
- October 8 - Michael Nakazawa
- October 19 - Mrs. Yamaguchi-San
- November 17 – Ranjin Singh
- November 18 - Taiyo Kea
- December 9 - Juggernaut
- December 10 :
  - Steve Bradley (died in 2008)
  - Tomohiro Ishii
- December 17 – Nick Dinsmore
- December 18 – Trish Stratus
- December 31 - Vance Nevada

== Debuts ==
- Uncertain debut date

- Leilani Kai
- Debbie Combs
- Rick McGraw
- Hillbilly Jim
- Yumi Ikeshita (All Japan Women's)

- January 15 - Américo Rocca and Kazuharu Sonoda
- March 19 - Maki Ueda (All Japan Women's)
- April 27 - Jackie Sato
- May 2 - Hubert Gallant
- May 13 - Jake Roberts
- July 17 - Lola Gonzales
- November 11 - Rayo de Jalisco Jr.
- December 24 - Dynamite Kid

== Retirements ==
- Argentina Apollo (1960 – 1975)
- Harold Sakata (1949 – 1975)

== Deaths ==
- January 5 - Ray Morgan (announcer), 60
- February 20 – Bobby Shane, 29
- February 23 - Dustin McDonald, 66
- May 13 - John Bilbo (wrestler), 69
- May 28 - Ezzard Charles, 53
- July 7 - Henri Deglane, 73
- August 19 - Jim Londos, 81
- October 17 - Ron Dupree (wrestler), 40
