= 1974 in professional wrestling =

1974 in professional wrestling describes the year's events in the world of professional wrestling.

== List of notable promotions ==
Only one promotion held notable shows in 1974.

Promotion Name	Abbreviation
All Japan Pro Wrestling	AJPW
Big Time Wrestling	BTW
Empresa Mexicana de Lucha Libre	EMLL
New Japan Pro Wrestling	NJPW

== Calendar of notable shows ==
Date	Promotion(s)	Event	Location	Main Event
March 26	BTW	Parade of Champions	Dallas, Texas	Jack Brisco (c) defeated Clay Spence in a singles match for the NWA World Heavyweight Championship
March 27	BTW	Parade of Champions	San Antonio, Texas	Jack Brisco (c) wrestled Dory Funk Jr. to a draw in a singles match for the NWA World Heavyweight Championship
April 24	EMLL	18. Aniversario de Arena México	Mexico City, Mexico	Aníbal and Steve Wright defeated Rene Guajardo and Tigre Colombiano in a Lucha de Apuestas mask and hair vs. mask and hair match
May 8	NJPW	World League	Tokyo, Japan	Antonio Inoki defeated Seiji Sakaguchi
May 26	AJPW	International Junior Heavyweight Title League	Tokyo, Japan	Chavo Guerrero defeated Ultra Seven
December 8	AJPW	Karl Gotch Cup	Tokyo, Japan	Tatsumi Fujinami defeated Masashi Ozawa
September 20	EMLL	EMLL 41st Anniversary Show	Mexico City, Mexico	La Ola Blanco (Dr. Wagner and Ángel Blanco) defeated Super Star and Enrique Vera in a best two-out-of-three falls Lucha de Apuesta mask and mask vs. mask and hair match
December 13	EMLL	Juicio Final	Mexico City, Mexico	Dr. Wagner and Ringo Mendoza defeated Ángel Blanco and Coloso Colosetti in a best two-out-of-three falls Lucha de Apuestas, hair vs. hair match
(c) – denotes defending champion(s)

== Notable events ==
- May 8 - The Valiant Brothers defeat Tony Garea and Dean Ho to become the WWWF World Tag Team Champions.
- October 24 - Nick Bockwinkel and Ray Stevens defeat The Crusher and Billy Robinson to become the AWA World Tag Team Champions.

== Awards and honors ==
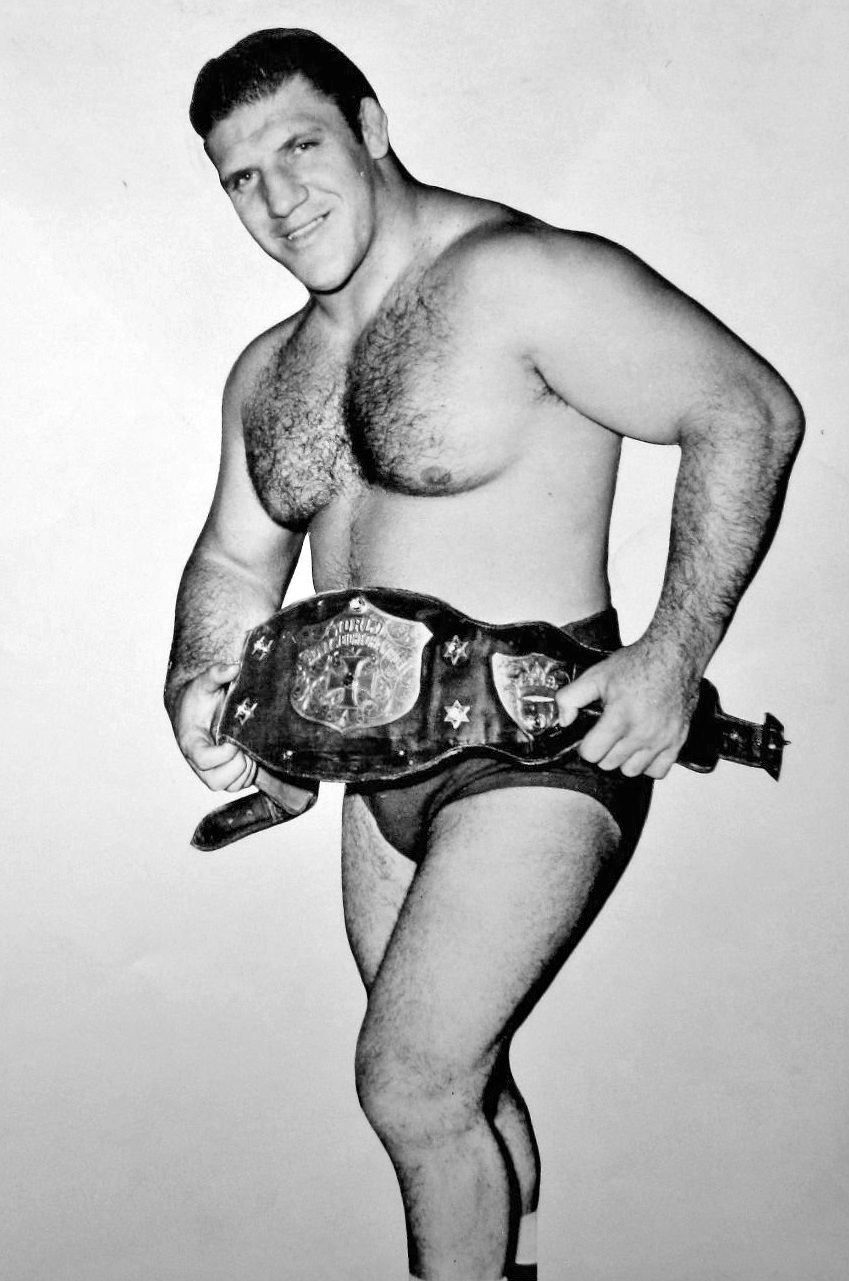
1974 PWI Wrestler of the Year, Bruno Sammartino

=== Pro Wrestling Illustrated ===
Category	Winner
PWI Wrestler of the Year	Bruno Sammartino
PWI Tag Team of the Year	Jimmy and Johnny Valiant
PWI Match of the Year	Jack Brisco vs. Dory Funk Jr.
PWI Most Popular Wrestler of the Year	Billy Robinson
PWI Most Hated Wrestler of the Year	The Great Mephisto
PWI Most Inspirational Wrestler of the Year	Dick Murdoch
PWI Rookie of the Year	Larry Zbyszko
PWI Woman of the Year	Rachel Dubois
PWI Midget Wrestler of the Year	Darlin` Dagmar
PWI Manager of the Year	Lou Albano

== Championship changes ==
=== EMLL ===
NWA World Light Heavyweight Championship
incoming champion – Ray Mendoza
Date	Winner	Event/Show	Note(s)
July 17	Vacant	N/A	
September 22	Dr. Wagner	EMLL 41st Anniversary Show	

NWA World Middleweight Championship
Incoming champion – Rene Guajardo
Date	Winner	Event/Show	Note(s)
July 17	Vacant	EMLL show	
September 20	Aníbal	EMLL show	

NWA World Welterweight Championship
Incoming champion – Mano Negra
No title changes

Mexican National Heavyweight Championship
Incoming champion – Enrique Vera
No title changes

Mexican National Middleweight Championship
Incoming champion – Adorable Rubí
Date	Winner	Event/Show	Note(s)
June 28	Aníbal	EMLL show	
September 20	Vacant	N/A	
November 29	Ringo Mendoza	EMLL show	

Mexican National Lightweight Championship
Incoming champion – Tauro
No title changes

Mexican National Light Heavyweight Championship
Incoming champion – Dr. Wagner
Date	Winner	Event/Show	Note(s)
September 22	Vacant	N/A	
November 15	Alfonso Dantes	EMLL show	

Mexican National Welterweight Championship
Incoming champion – Fishman
No title changes

Mexican National Women's Championship
Incoming champion – Uncertain
No title changes

=== NWA ===
NWA Worlds Heavyweight Championship
Incoming champion – Jack Brisco
Date	Winner	Event/Show	Note(s)
December 2	Giant Baba	House show	
December 9	Jack Brisco	House show	

== Births ==
- January 4 – Dark Cuervo
- January 5 - Yutaka Yoshie (died in 2024)
- February 19 – Danny Doring
- March 1 – Brandi Alexander
- March 4 – Crowbar
- March 11 - Jonny Fairplay
- March 14 - Santino Marella
- March 27 – Russ Haas (d. 2001)
- April 6 – Flash Flanagan
- April 9 – Jenna Jameson
- April 14 - Toshie Uematsu
- April 21 – Orlando Jordan
- April 24 – Octagoncito
- April 27 - Johnny Devine
- May 11 – Billy Kidman
- May 21 - Josef Samael
- June 6 – 2 Tuff Tony
- June 22 - Amber O'Neal
- June 26 – Matt Striker
- June 27:
  - Ace Darling
  - Rob Dyrdek
- July 6:
  - Harashima
  - Black Buffalo
- July 12 – Gregory Helms
- July 13 – Konan Big
- July 16 – Chris Chetti
- July 19 –
  - Rey Bucanero
  - Jeremy Borash
- July 23 – Sonny Siaki
- July 25 :
  - Kenzo Suzuki
  - Mikael Judas
- August 5 – Rob Black
- August 8 – Scott D'Amore
- September 5 – Derick Neikirk
- September 8 - Rick Michaels
- September 9 – Jun Kasai
- September 18 – Reckless Youth
- September 20 - Robbie McAllister
- September 23 – Matt Hardy
- September 24:
  - Carl Leduc
  - Dru Onyx
- September 30 – Eli Cottonwood
- October 8 – H. C. Loc
- October 14 – Shaggy 2 Dope
- October 17 – Cincinnati Red (died in 2015)
- October 31 - Jungle Grrrl
- November 16:
  - John Cone
  - Starman (died in 2022)
- November 28 – Rob Conway
- November 30 – Juventud Guerrera
- December 6 - Kentaro Shiga
- December 11 – Rey Mysterio
- December 12 – Chad Collyer
- December 31 – Tzuki

== Debuts ==
- Uncertain debut date

- Adrian Adonis
- Jake Roberts
- Jesse Ventura
- Jerry Blackwell
- Tommy Rich
- Dave Finlay
- Lanny Poffo
- Mach Fumiake (All Japan Women)
- Shinobu Aso (All Japan Women)

- April 8 - Antonio Peña
- April 22 - Masanobu Fuchi
- July 10 - Tony Atlas
- August 6 - Vivian St. John
- August 8 - Riki Choshu

== Retirements ==
- Fred Atkins (? – 1974)
- Dave Ruhl (1946 – 1974)
- Bearcat Wright (1959 – 1974)

== Deaths ==
- January 25 - Joe Savoldi, 65
- March 13 - Gene Dubuque, 46
- March 29 - Joe Stecher, 80
- April 2 - Lee Wykoff, 76
- May 31 - Sky Hi Lee, 53
- June 24 – Mangla Rai, 60
- July 26 – Freddie Sweetan, 36
- August 21 – Buford Pusser, 37
- September 3 – Mighty Jumbo (wrestler), 51
- September 13 - Jack Pfefer, 79
- September 18 - Ray Richards, 68
- October 29 - Axel Cadier, 68
