= Juicio Final (1970) =

Mexican professional wrestling event

- Promotion: Empresa Mexicana de Lucha Libre
- Date: December 11, 1970
- City: Mexico City, Mexico
- Venue: Arena México

Event chronology
← Previous; EMLL 37th Anniversary Show	Next → EMLL 38th Anniversary Show

Juicio Final chronology
← Previous; 1969	Next → 1972

Juicio Final (1970) (Spanish for "Final Judgement" 1970) was a professional wrestling supercard show, scripted and produced by Consejo Mundial de Lucha Libre (CMLL), which took place on December 11, 1970, in Arena México, Mexico City, Mexico. The show served as the year-end finale for CMLL before Arena México, CMLL's main venue, closed down for the winter for renovations and to host Circo Atayde. The shows replaced the regular Super Viernes ("Super Friday") shows held by CMLL since the mid-1930s.

The focus of the 1970 Juicio Final show was a four team tag team tournament featuring the teams of La Ola Blanca (Ángel Blanco and El Solitario), Mr. Koma and Shibata Yama, Coloso Colosetti and Rene Guajardo, Aníbal and El Santo. In the main event Colosetti and Guajardy defeated Ángel Blanco and El Solitario to take the tournament. The show featured five additional matches.

== Production ==
=== Background ===
For decades Arena México, the main venue of the Mexican professional wrestling promotion Consejo Mundial de Lucha Libre (CMLL), would close down in early December and remain closed into either January or February to allow for renovations as well as letting Circo Atayde occupy the space over the holidays. As a result, CMLL usually held a "end of the year" supercard show on the first or second Friday of December in lieu of their normal Super Viernes show. 1955 was the first year where CMLL used the name "El Juicio Final" ("The Final Judgement") for their year-end supershow. It is no longer an annually recurring show, but instead held intermittently sometimes several years apart and not always in the same month of the year either. All Juicio Final shows have been held in Arena México in Mexico City, Mexico which is CMLL's main venue, its "home".

=== Storylines ===
The 1970 Juicio Final show featured seven professional wrestling matches scripted by CMLL with some wrestlers involved in scripted feuds. The wrestlers portray either heels (referred to as rudos in Mexico, those that play the part of the "bad guys") or faces (técnicos in Mexico, the "good guy" characters) as they perform.

== Results ==
No.	Results	Stipulations
1	Leo López defeated Greco	Singles match
2	Rey Medina defeated Rafael Valenzuela	Singles match
3	Índio Jerónimo defeated Chucho Villa	Singles match
4	Vick Amezcua defeated Humberto Garza	Singles match
5	Dr. Wagner defeated Danny Rodríguez	Singles match
6	La Ola Blanca (Ángel Blanco and El Solitario) defeated Mr. Koma and Shibata Yama	Tag team tournament semi-final match
7	Coloso Colosetti and Rene Guajardo defeated Aníbal and El Santo	Tag team tournament semi-final match
8	Coloso Colosetti and Rene Guajardo defeated La Ola Blanca (Ángel Blanco and El Solitario)	Tag team tournament final match
