= Juicio Final (1974) =

Mexican professional wrestling event

- Promotion: Empresa Mexicana de Lucha Libre
- Date: December 13, 1974
- City: Mexico City, Mexico
- Venue: Arena México

Event chronology
← Previous; EMLL 41st Anniversary Show	Next →: 19. Aniversario de Arena México

Juicio Final chronology
← Previous; 1972	Next → 1975

Juicio Final (1974) (Spanish for "Final Judgement" 1974) was a professional wrestling supercard show, scripted and produced by Consejo Mundial de Lucha Libre (CMLL), which took place on December 13, 1974, in Arena México, Mexico City, Mexico. The show served as the year-end finale for CMLL before Arena México, CMLL's main venue, closed down for the winter for renovations and to host Circo Atayde. The shows replaced the regular Super Viernes ("Super Friday") shows held by CMLL since the mid-1930s.

In the main event Dr. Wagner and Ringo Mendoza defeated the team of Ángel Blanco and Coloso Colosetti in a best two-out-of-three falls match, which forced Ángel Blanco and Coloso Colosetti to have all their hair shaved off due to the Lucha de Apuestas stipulation. In the fifth match of the night Aníbal successfully defended the NWA World Middleweight Championship against Adorable Rubí. The show featured four additional matches, including the team of Alfonso Dantés and TNT defeating Cien Caras and Enrique Vera in the semi-main event. The outcome of the first three matches have not been confirmed, only that they were advertised.

== Production ==
=== Background ===
For decades Arena México, the main venue of the Mexican professional wrestling promotion Consejo Mundial de Lucha Libre (CMLL), would close down in early December and remain closed into either January or February to allow for renovations as well as letting Circo Atayde occupy the space over the holidays. As a result, CMLL usually held a "end of the year" supercard show on the first or second Friday of December in lieu of their normal Super Viernes show. 1955 was the first year where CMLL used the name "El Juicio Final" ("The Final Judgement") for their year-end supershow. It is no longer an annually recurring show, but instead held intermittently sometimes several years apart and not always in the same month of the year either. All Juicio Final shows have been held in Arena México in Mexico City, Mexico which is CMLL's main venue, its "home".

=== Storylines ===
The 1974 Juicio Final show featured seven professional wrestling matches scripted by CMLL with some wrestlers involved in scripted feuds. The wrestlers portray either heels (referred to as rudos in Mexico, those that play the part of the "bad guys") or faces (técnicos in Mexico, the "good guy" characters) as they perform.

== Results ==
No.	Results	Stipulations
1^{D}	El Polaco vs. Marrio Rocca ended in an unknown manner	Singles match
2^{D}	César Silva vs. Manuel Robles ended in an unknown manner	Singles match
3^{D}	Paco Pardinez vs. Chino Chow ended in an unknown manner	Singles match
4^{D}	Goro Tanaka vs. Raúl Reyes ended in an unknown manner	Singles match
5	Aníbal (c) defeated Adorable Rubí	Singles match for the NWA World Middleweight Championship
6	Alfonso Dantés and TNT defeated Cien Caras and Enrique Vera	Tag team match
7	Dr. Wagner and Ringo Mendoza defeated Ángel Blanco and Coloso Colosetti	Best two-out-of-three falls Lucha de Apuestas, hair vs. hair match
(c) / – the champion(s) heading into the match; D / – this was a dark match
