= EMLL 42nd Anniversary Show =

EMLL 42nd Anniversary Show may refer to:

- EMLL 42nd Anniversary Show (1), a professional wrestling major show on September 19, 1975, in Arena México, Mexico City, Mexico
- EMLL 42nd Anniversary Show (2), a professional wrestling major show on September 26, 1975, in Arena México, Mexico City, Mexico
- EMLL 42nd Anniversary Show (3), a professional wrestling major show on October 3, 1975, in Arena México, Mexico City, Mexico
