= Juicio Final (1966) =

Mexican professional wrestling event

- Promotion: Empresa Mexicana de Lucha Libre
- Date: December 13, 1966
- City: Mexico City, Mexico
- Venue: Arena México

Event chronology
| ← Previous; EMLL 34th Anniversary Show | Next →: 12. Aniversario de Arena México |

Juicio Final chronology
| ← Previous; 1965 | Next → 1968 |

Juicio Final (1966) (Spanish for "Final Judgement" 1966) was a professional wrestling supercard show, scripted and produced by Consejo Mundial de Lucha Libre (CMLL), which took place on December 13, 1966, in Arena México, Mexico City, Mexico. The show served as the year-end finale for CMLL before Arena México, CMLL's main venue, closed down for the winter for renovations and to host Circo Atayde. The shows replaced the regular Super Viernes ("Super Friday") shows held by CMLL since the mid-1930s.

The main event was a rematch of one of the most well-known lucha matches of the mid-20th century as El Santo face off against longtime rival Black Shadow, defeating him again once more as he did in 1952 when he unmasked Black Shadow. The show also featured two semi-final matches in a tournament to determine the next challengers for the Arena México Tag Team Championship. In one semi-final match, La Ola Blanca ("The White Wave"; Ángel Blanco and Dr. Wagner) defeated Los Espantos ("The Terrors"; Espanto I and Espanto II) to advance in the tournament. In the other semi-main event match Dory Dixon and Mil Máscaras defeated Los Rebeldes (Karloff Lagarde and Rene Guajardo) by disqualification.

== Production ==
=== Background ===
For decades Arena México, the main venue of the Mexican professional wrestling promotion Consejo Mundial de Lucha Libre (CMLL), would close down in early December and remain closed into either January or February to allow for renovations as well as letting Circo Atayde occupy the space over the holidays. As a result, CMLL usually held a "end of the year" supercard show on the first or second Friday of December in lieu of their normal 'Super Viernes show. 1955 was the first year where CMLL used the name "El Juicio Final" ("The Final Judgement") for their year-end supershow. It is no longer an annually recurring show, but instead held intermittently sometimes several years apart and not always in the same month of the year either. All Juicio Final shows have been held in Arena México in Mexico City, Mexico which is CMLL's main venue, its "home".

=== Storylines ===
The 1966 Juicio Final show featured seven professional wrestling matches scripted by CMLL with some wrestlers involved in scripted feuds. The wrestlers portray either heels (referred to as rudos in Mexico, those that play the part of the "bad guys") or faces (técnicos in Mexico, the "good guy" characters) as they perform.

== Results ==
| No. | Results | Stipulations |
|---|---|---|
| 1 | Rolando Costa defeated Buffalo Reyes | Singles match |
| 2 | Mao Chang defeated Misterio II | Singles match |
| 3 | Antonio Montoro defeated Vick Amezcua | Singles match |
| 4 | Sugi Sito defeated Rubén Juárez | Singles match |
| 5 | La Ola Blanca (Ángel Blanco and Dr. Wagner) defeated Los Espantos (Espanto I and Espanto II) | Arena México Tag Team Championship #1 contenders tournament semi-final match |
| 6 | Dory Dixon and Mil Máscaras defeated Los Rebeldes (Karloff Lagarde and Rene Guajardo) by disqualification | Arena México Tag Team Championship #1 contenders tournament semi-final match |
| 7 | El Santo defeated Black Shadow | Best two-out-of-three falls match |
