= Juicio Final (1969) =

Mexican professional wrestling event

- Promotion: Empresa Mexicana de Lucha Libre
- Date: December 19, 1969
- City: Mexico City, Mexico
- Venue: Arena México

Event chronology
← Previous; EMLL 36th Anniversary Show	Next →: 14. Aniversario de Arena México

Juicio Final chronology
← Previous; 1968	Next → 1970

Juicio Final (1969) (Spanish for "Final Judgement" 1969) was a professional wrestling supercard show, scripted and produced by Consejo Mundial de Lucha Libre (CMLL), which took place on December 19, 1969, in Arena México, Mexico City, Mexico. The show served as the year-end finale for CMLL before Arena México, CMLL's main venue, closed down for the winter for renovations and to host Circo Atayde. The shows replaced the regular Super Viernes ("Super Friday") shows held by CMLL since the mid-1930s.

Due to his loss to Aníbal in the main event, Red Terror was forced to remove his mask and state his real name, Sammy Chavez from Ciudad Juarez due to the Lucha de Apuestas, or "bet match" stipulations. In the semi-main event, NWA World Light Heavyweight Champion Ray Mendoza successfully defended the championship against Coloso Colosetti, two falls to one. The show featured five additional matches.

== Production ==
=== Background ===
For decades Arena México, the main venue of the Mexican professional wrestling promotion Consejo Mundial de Lucha Libre (CMLL), would close down in early December and remain closed into either January or February to allow for renovations as well as letting Circo Atayde occupy the space over the holidays. As a result, CMLL usually held a "end of the year" supercard show on the first or second Friday of December in lieu of their normal Super Viernes show. 1955 was the first year where CMLL used the name "El Juicio Final" ("The Final Judgement") for their year-end supershow. It is no longer an annually recurring show, but instead held intermittently sometimes several years apart and not always in the same month of the year either. All Juicio Final shows have been held in Arena México in Mexico City, Mexico which is CMLL's main venue, its "home".

=== Storylines ===
The 1969 Juicio Final show featured seven professional wrestling matches scripted by CMLL with some wrestlers involved in scripted feuds. The wrestlers portray either heels (referred to as rudos in Mexico, those that play the part of the "bad guys") or faces (técnicos in Mexico, the "good guy" characters) as they perform.

== Results ==
No.	Results	Stipulations
1	Rodolfo Ruiz defeated Chico Veloz	Singles match
2	Ciclón Veloz Jr. defeated Rizado Ruiz	Singles match
3	Alfonso Dantes defeated Steve Clements	Singles match
4	Black Gordman defeated Antonio Posa	Singles match
5	Los Rebeldes (Karloff Lagarde and Rene Guajardo) defeated El Santo and Raúl Mata	Tag team match
6	Ray Mendoza (c) defeated Coloso Colosetti	Singles match for the NWA World Light Heavyweight Championship
7	Aníbal defeated Red Terror	Best two-out-of-three falls Lucha de Apuestas, mask Vs. mask match
(c) / – the champion(s) heading into the match
