= Ángel Azteca =

Mexican professional wrestler (1963–2007)

- Azteca pictured with the Mexican National Welterweight and NWA World Middleweight Championships in 1989

Personal information
- Born: Juan Manuel Zúñiga; June 24, 1963 Gómez Palacio, Durango, Mexico
- Died: March 18, 2007 (aged 43) Campeche, Campeche, Mexico

Professional wrestling career
- Ring name(s): Charro; Ángel Azteca; El Charro; Charro de Jalisco
- Billed height: 172 cm (5 ft 8 in)
- Billed weight: 98 kg (216 lb)
- Billed from: Mexico City, Mexico
- Trained by: Héctor López; Asterión; Dr. Wagner
- Debut: 1980

Juan Manuel Zúñiga (June 24, 1963 – March 18, 2007) was a Mexican professional wrestler, best known for working under the ring name Ángel Azteca (Spanish for "Aztec Angel") since the late 1980s. Zúñiga is not related to wrestlers "Ángel Azteca, Jr." and "Ángel Azteca II", instead they paid Zúñiga to use the name and image. As Ángel Azteca Zúñiga worked as an masked wrestler, until losing a match against Arkangel de la Muerte in 2003 where he was forced to unmask.

Zúñiga died of a heart attack on March 18, 2007, only a few hours after wrestling in the main event of a local promotion.

== Professional wrestling career ==
Juan Zúñiga trained under Héctor López, Asterión and Mexican superstar Dr. Wagner before making his professional wrestling debut in 1980. Initially, he worked as "Charro" or "Charro de Jalisco", winning the Mexican National Cruiserweight Championship on October 24, 1986, from Adorable Rubí. On December 28, he lost the title to a wrestler named "Judas".

In 1988, he changed his ring persona to "Ángel Azteca" (Aztec Angel), which he would keep for the remainder of his career as he began working full-time for Empresa Mexicana de Lucha Libre (EMLL; later renamed to Consejo Mundial de Lucha Libre (CMLL)). Azteca was paired with fellow técnico (a good guy character or face) Atlantis to form a very successful tag team, winning the Mexican National Tag Team Championship on March 6, from the team of Los Infernales (Masakre and MS-1). Over the next 811 days, Azteca and Atlantis defended the tag team titles against various teams like Hombre Bala and Pirata Morgan, El Dandy and El Texano and Pierroth Jr. and Ulisses. On February 26, 1989, Ángel Azteca became a double champion when he defeated Bestia Salvaje for the Mexican National Welterweight Championship. Two months later, Azteca vacated the title after defeating Emilio Charles, Jr. to win the NWA World Middleweight Championship, moving up to the Middleweight division. Azteca would make several successful defenses against the former champion, as well as El Hijo del Gladiador. On May 25, 1990, Atlantis and Ángel Azteca lost the Mexican National Tag Team Championship to Pierroth Jr. and Bestia Salvaje. A couple of months later, El Dandy won the NWA World Middleweight Championship from Azteca.

The loss of the tag team titles was used as the storyline motivation for Ángel Azteca turning rudo (a villain or heel) after attacking Atlantis. The feud between the two continued off and on until Azteca's death in 2007, although the two remained close friends backstage. On March 9, 1991, Azteca and Volador teamed up to win the Mexican National Tag Team Championship from Pierroth Jr. and Salvaje, holding them for two months before dropping it to Los Destructores (Tony Arce and Vulcano). In 1992, Azteca left CMLL and joined a large number of ex-CMLL employees in the newly created Asistencia Asesoría y Administración (AAA) promotion, where he, El Hijo del Santo and Super Muñeco won the Mexican National Trios Championship from Los Payasos (Coco Amarillo, Coco Azul and Coco Rojo). The trio held the championship for 124 days before losing it back to Los Payasos. After losing the trios title, Azteca briefly worked as "Charro de Jalisco" before leaving AAA not long after.

When he returned to CMLL, the creative team was planning on giving Ángel Azteca a new mask and outfit to "freshen up" the character, but when Azteca temporarily retired from wrestling, the new mask design and tights was given to a new CMLL wrestler dubbed Último Guerrero. Zúñiga only worked in a very limited capacity from the mid-1990s until he returned to CMLL in early 2003. Azteca began working a low card feud with Arkangel de la Muerte that received limited publicity until CMLL began hyping their 70th Anniversary show, where Ángel Azteca versus Arkangel de la Muerte was booked in a Luchas de Apuestas (bet match), which would force the loser to unmask. Arkangel won, unmasking Ázteca in what was his last high publicity match.

After the mask loss, Azteca left CMLL, working a limited schedule on the independent circuit and occasionally working as a referee. He returned to the ring in 2006, mainly to help push "Ángel Azteca II" and "Ángel Azteca Jr."; two wrestlers who paid Zúñiga to use the "Ángel Azteca" name. After Zúñiga's death, Ángel Azteca II changed his name to Emperador Azteca, while Ángel Azteca, Jr. still used the name in CMLL without claiming to be the son of Ángel Azteca.

== Personal life ==
Juan Zúñiga was married and the couple had five children together. Zúñiga had a reputation of being a gentleman both inside and outside of the ring and was very respected by his peers.

== Death ==
On March 13, 2007, Zúñiga teamed up with Demonio Rojo and Pinkusky as they lost a match to Atlantis, Imperio Dorado and Rebelde Punk in the main event of a local Campeche show. After the match, Zúñiga signed autographs for the fans, but then began complaining of chest pains in the locker room. The event doctor immediately took him to the Manuel Campos Hospital, but Zúñiga died shortly after arriving. The autopsy revealed that Zúñiga had died from a heart attack. The body was later taken to Mexico City for the wake before being transferred to Zúñiga's home town of Torreón, Coahuila, where he was buried.

== Championships and accomplishments ==
- Asistencia Asesoría y Administración
  - Mexican National Trios Championship (1 time) – with El Hijo del Santo and Super Muñeco
- Empresa Mexicana de Lucha Libre / Consejo Mundial de Lucha Libre
  - Mexican National Cruiserweight Championship (1 time) – as "Charro de Jalisco"
  - Mexican National Tag Team Championship (2 times) – with Atlantis, Super Parka
  - Mexican National Welterweight Championship (1 time)
  - NWA World Middleweight Championship (1 time)
- Local Mexican promotions
  - Laguna Lightweight Championship (1 time)
  - Arena Victoria Tag Team Championship (1 time)

== Luchas de Apuestas record ==
Winner (wager)	Loser (wager)	Location	Event	Date	Notes
Ángel Azteca (mask)	Dr. Muerte (mask)	N/A	Live event	N/A	
Príncipe Maya (hair)	Ángel Azteca (hair)	Tlalnepantla, State of Mexico	Live event	N/A	(Note: This was a Lucha el Reves, or a hair vs. hair match between masked wrestlers.)
Ángel Azteca (mask)	Príncipe Maya (mask)	Tlalnepantla, State of Mexico	Live event	N/A	
Ángel Azteca (mask)	Kraken (mask)	Mexico City	Live event	December 7, 1998	
Arkangel de la Muerte (mask)	Ángel Azteca (mask)	Mexico City	Sin Piedad	May 12, 2003	

== See also ==
- List of premature professional wrestling deaths
