= Juicio Final (1968) =

Mexican professional wrestling event

- Promotion: Empresa Mexicana de Lucha Libre
- Date: December 13, 1968
- City: Mexico City, Mexico
- Venue: Arena México

Event chronology
← Previous; 12. Aniversario de Arena México	Next → EMLL 36th Anniversary Show

Juicio Final chronology
← Previous; 1966	Next → 1969

Juicio Final (1968) (Spanish for "Final Judgement" 1968) was a professional wrestling supercard show, scripted and produced by Consejo Mundial de Lucha Libre (CMLL), which took place on December 13, 1968, in Arena México, Mexico City, Mexico. The show served as the year-end finale for CMLL before Arena México, CMLL's main venue, closed down for the winter for renovations and to host Circo Atayde. The shows replaced the regular Super Viernes ("Super Friday") shows held by CMLL since the mid-1930s.

The main event match was contested under Lucha de Apuestas rules, with El Solitario risking his mask while Rey Mendoza risked his hair on the outcome of the match. During the first of a scheduled three falls, Mendoza was injured and was not able to compete any further. As a result, Mendoza did not have his hair shaved off after the fall. But would shave his own hair off at a subsequent show out of respect for the traditions of lucha libre. In the semi-main event El Santo defeated Rene Guajardo, supposedly to win the NWA World Middleweight Championship. Sources have not confirmed any of the other matches on the show.

== Production ==
=== Background ===
For decades Arena México, the main venue of the Mexican professional wrestling promotion Consejo Mundial de Lucha Libre (CMLL), would close down in early December and remain closed into either January or February to allow for renovations as well as letting Circo Atayde occupy the space over the holidays. As a result, CMLL usually held a "end of the year" supercard show on the first or second Friday of December in lieu of their normal Super Viernes show. 1955 was the first year where CMLL used the name "El Juicio Final" ("The Final Judgement") for their year-end supershow. It is no longer an annually recurring show, but instead held intermittently sometimes several years apart and not always in the same month of the year either. All Juicio Final shows have been held in Arena México in Mexico City, Mexico which is CMLL's main venue, its "home".

=== Storylines ===
The 1968 Juicio Final show featured seven professional wrestling matches scripted by CMLL with some wrestlers involved in scripted feuds. The wrestlers portray either heels (referred to as rudos in Mexico, those that play the part of the "bad guys") or faces (técnicos in Mexico, the "good guy" characters) as they perform.

== Results ==
No.	Results	Stipulations
1	El Santo defeated René Guajardo (c)	Singles match for the NWA World Middleweight Championship
2	El Solitario defeated Ray Mendoza	Best two-out-of-three falls Lucha de Apuestas, Hair vs. Hair match
(c) / – the champion(s) heading into the match
