= Juicio Final (1965) =

Mexican professional wrestling event

- Promotion: Empresa Mexicana de Lucha Libre
- Date: December 3, 1965
- City: Mexico City, Mexico
- Venue: Arena Coliseo

Event chronology
← Previous; EMLL 32nd Anniversary Show	Next → EMLL 33rd Anniversary Show

Juicio Final chronology
← Previous; 1955	Next → 1966

Juicio Final (1965) (Spanish for "Final Judgement" 1965) was a professional wrestling supercard show, scripted and produced by Consejo Mundial de Lucha Libre (CMLL), which took place on December 3, 1965, in Arena México, Mexico City, Mexico. The show served as the year-end finale for CMLL before Arena México, CMLL's main venue, closed down for the winter for renovations and to host Circo Atayde . The shows replaced the regular Super Viernes ("Super Friday") shows held by CMLL since the mid-1930s.

The top two matches for the show were both contested under Lucha de Apuestas, or "bet match" rules, where all competitors in the match "bet" either their mask or their hair in case they are not masked. In the headline match two of EMLL's headliner wrestlers faced off as Karloff Lagarde defeated Cavernario Galindo, which meant that Galindo was shaved bald afterwards as a result of his "bet". In the semi-main event lucha film star Huracán Ramírez successfully defended his mask as he pinned The Scorpió to win the match, forcing The Scorpió to unmask and state his name, Roberto Grimaldo.

== Production ==
=== Background ===
For decades Arena México, the main venue of the Mexican professional wrestling promotion Consejo Mundial de Lucha Libre (CMLL), would close down in early December and remain closed into either January or February to allow for renovations as well as letting Circo Atayde occupy the space over the holidays. As a result, CMLL usually held a "end of the year" supercard show on the first or second Friday of December in lieu of their normal Super Viernes show. 1955 was the first year where CMLL used the name "El Juicio Final" ("The Final Judgement") for their year-end supershow. It is no longer an annually recurring show, but instead held intermittently sometimes several years apart and not always in the same month of the year either. All Juicio Final shows have been held in Arena México in Mexico City, Mexico which is CMLL's main venue, its "home".

=== Storylines ===
The 1965 Juicio Final show featured seven professional wrestling matches scripted by CMLL with some wrestlers involved in scripted feuds. The wrestlers portray either heels (referred to as rudos in Mexico, those that play the part of the "bad guys") or faces (técnicos in Mexico, the "good guy" characters) as they perform.

== Results ==
No.	Results	Stipulations
1	El Conde Negro defeated Mario Ramírez	Singles match
2	Ángel Blanco vs. César Silva ended in a time limit draw	Singles match
3	Felipe Ham Lee defeated El Nazi by disqualification	Singles match
4	Ray Mendoza defeated Dorrel Dixon	Singles match
5	Black Shadow and Rayo de Jalisco defeated Henry Pilusso and Rene Guajardo	Tag team match
6	Huracán Ramírez defeated The Scorpión	Best two-out-of-three falls Lucha de Apuestas, mask Vs. mask match
7	Karloff Lagarde defeated Cavernario Galindo	Best two-out-of-three falls Lucha de Apuestas, hair Vs. hair match
