= EMLL 42nd Anniversary Show (1) =

EMLL 42nd Anniversary Show #1
- Promotion: Empresa Mexicana de Lucha Libre
- Date: September 19, 1975
- City: Mexico City, Mexico
- Venue: Arena México
- Attendance: Unknown

Event chronology
← Previous; 19. Aniversario de Arena México	Next → EMLL 42nd Anniversary Show (2)

EMLL Anniversary Show chronology
← Previous; 41st Anniversary	Next → 42nd Anniversary (2)

Mexican professional wrestling promotion Empresa Mexicana de Lucha Libre (EMLL) celebrated their 42nd anniversary with three professional wrestling major shows centering on the anniversary date in mid to late September. The first EMLL 42nd Anniversary Show (Spanish: 42. Aniversario de EMLL) took place on September 19, 1975, in Arena México, Mexico City, Mexico to commemorate the anniversary of EMLL, which over time became the oldest professional wrestling promotion in the world. The Anniversary show is EMLL's biggest show of the year. The EMLL Anniversary Show series is the longest-running annual professional wrestling show, starting in 1934.

== Production ==
=== Background ===
The 1975 Anniversary show commemorated the 42nd anniversary of the Mexican professional wrestling company Empresa Mexicana de Lucha Libre (Spanish for "Mexican Wrestling Promotion"; EMLL) holding their first show on September 22, 1933 by promoter and founder Salvador Lutteroth. EMLL was rebranded early in 1992 to become Consejo Mundial de Lucha Libre ("World Wrestling Council"; CMLL) signal their departure from the National Wrestling Alliance. With the sales of the Jim Crockett Promotions to Ted Turner in 1988 EMLL became the oldest, still-operating wrestling promotion in the world. Over the years EMLL/CMLL has on occasion held multiple shows to celebrate their anniversary but since 1977 the company has only held one annual show, which is considered the biggest show of the year, CMLL's equivalent of WWE's WrestleMania or their Super Bowl event. CMLL has held their Anniversary show at Arena México in Mexico City, Mexico since 1956, the year the building was completed, over time Arena México earned the nickname "The Cathedral of Lucha Libre" due to it hosting most of EMLL/CMLL's major events since the building was completed. Traditionally EMLL/CMLL holds their major events on Friday Nights, replacing their regularly scheduled Super Viernes show.

=== Storylines ===
The event featured an undetermined number of professional wrestling matches with different wrestlers involved in pre-existing scripted feuds, plots and storylines. Wrestlers were portrayed as either heels (referred to as rudos in Mexico, those that portray the "bad guys") or faces (técnicos in Mexico, the "good guy" characters) as they followed a series of tension-building events, which culminated in a wrestling match or series of matches. Due to the nature of keeping mainly paper records of wrestling at the time no documentation has been found for some of the matches of the show.

== Event ==
EMLL held three separate shows in 1975 to celebrate their 42nd anniversary, with the first one taking place on September 19, 1975. The major matches of the show included Dr. Wagner facing his former Ola Blanca ("White Wave") tag team partner Ángel Blanco, defending the NWA World Light Heavyweight Championship against his partner turned opponent. Wagner was able to defend the title, two falls to one. In the main event Los Gemelo Diablos ("The Twin Devils"referred to as simply I and II) faced the team of Coloso Colosetti and Rubi Rubalcava. The match was contested under Lucha de Apuesta or "Bet Match" rules where both teams put their hair on the line. Los Gemelo defeated Rubalcava and Colosetti, forcing them to have their hair shaved off.

== Results ==
No.	Results	Stipulations
1	Dr. Wagner (c) defeated Ángel Blanco	Best two-out-of-three falls match for the NWA World Light Heavyweight Championship
2	Los Gemelo Diablos (I and II) defeated Coloso Colosetti and Rubi Rubalcava	Best two out-of-three-falls Lucha de Apuesta hair vs. hair match
(c) / – the champion(s) heading into the match
