= Mexican National Cruiserweight Championship =

Mexican professional wrestling championship

Mexican National Cruiserweight Championship (Campeonato Nacional Crucero)
- The championship belt

Details
- Promotion: Comisión de Box y Lucha Libre Mexico D.F. (Sanctioning body); Asistencia Asesoría y Administración (1993–2008); Mexican Independent circuit (2013–Present)
- Date established: November 13, 1983
- Date retired: December 8, 2008
Statistics
- First champion: Ángel Blanco
- Final champion: La Parka Jr.
- Most reigns: Karis la Momia / La Parka (2 Reigns)
- Longest reign: La Parka (3,591 days)
- Shortest reign: Judas (92 days)

The Mexican National Cruiserweight Championship (Campeonato Nacional Crucero in Spanish) is a national Mexican singles professional wrestling championship controlled by Comisión de Box y Lucha Libre Mexico D.F. (Mexico City Boxing and Wrestling Commission). From its establishment in 1983, no one promotion promoted the championship but was shared between several Mexican promotions, and not exclusively by Empresa Mexicana de Lucha Libre (EMLL). In the mid-1990s AAA gained primary booking control of the championship. (Note: In this statement, "control" refers to the everyday use of the championship, determining which storylines the championship is being used in, who gets to challenge for it and how to use it in a public relations sense.) Being a professional wrestling championship, it was not won legitimately but via a scripted ending to a match or awarded to a wrestler because of a storyline. The official definition of the cruiserweight weightclass in Mexico is between 77 kg (170 lb) and 80 kg (180 lb).

Ángel Blanco became the first National Cruiserweight Champion when he won the inaugural tournament on November 13, 1984, defeating Insolito in the final. In the mid-1990s AAA gained control of the championship when title holder Blue Demon Jr. began working for AAA full-time. When Blue Demon Jr. lost the Cruiserweight Championship to Karis La Momia AAA took full control of the Championship. In 1996 Karis la Momia changed his ring character to La Parka Jr. and had to vacate the title since his history working as Karis was not publicly acknowledged by AAA at the time. In 1999 La Parka regained the title, becoming the only two-time champion. The title was seldom defended since from the early 2000s and it was officially vacated by AAA on December 8, 2008.

== History ==
The Comisión de Box y Lucha Libre Mexico D.F. (Mexico City Boxing and Wrestling Commission) sanctioned a Mexican National Cruiserweight Championship in late 1983, allowing the Universal Wrestling Association (UWA) to host a tournament for the inaugural champion. Records are unclear as to who participated in the tournament, only that Ángel Blanco defeated Insoliton on November 13, 1984. Different sources list the end of the second reign by Adorable Rubí on different dates. The Royal and Will book "Wrestling title histories: professional wrestling champions around the world from the 19th century to the present", documents that Rubí vacated the championship on September 10, 1985. More current, online sources, such as CageMatch and Wrestling Data list that the reign was ended by Charro de Jalisco on October 24, 1986. In 1992, the reigning title holder Destructor de Idolos was forced to vacate the championship because of an injury that meant he was unable to defend the title. Rock el Cavernicolo defeated Dinamico to win the vacant championship. On May 15, 1996, Karis la Momia won the championship from Blue Demon Jr., only to relinquish it in November as he stopped working as Karis la Momia and changed his ring name to La Parka Jr. He would later regain the championship, making him the only person to hold the championship twice. La Parka Jr. did not defend the championship from winning it in 1999, until December 2008, where AAA abandoned all of the Mexican National Championships that they were promoting.

== Reigns ==
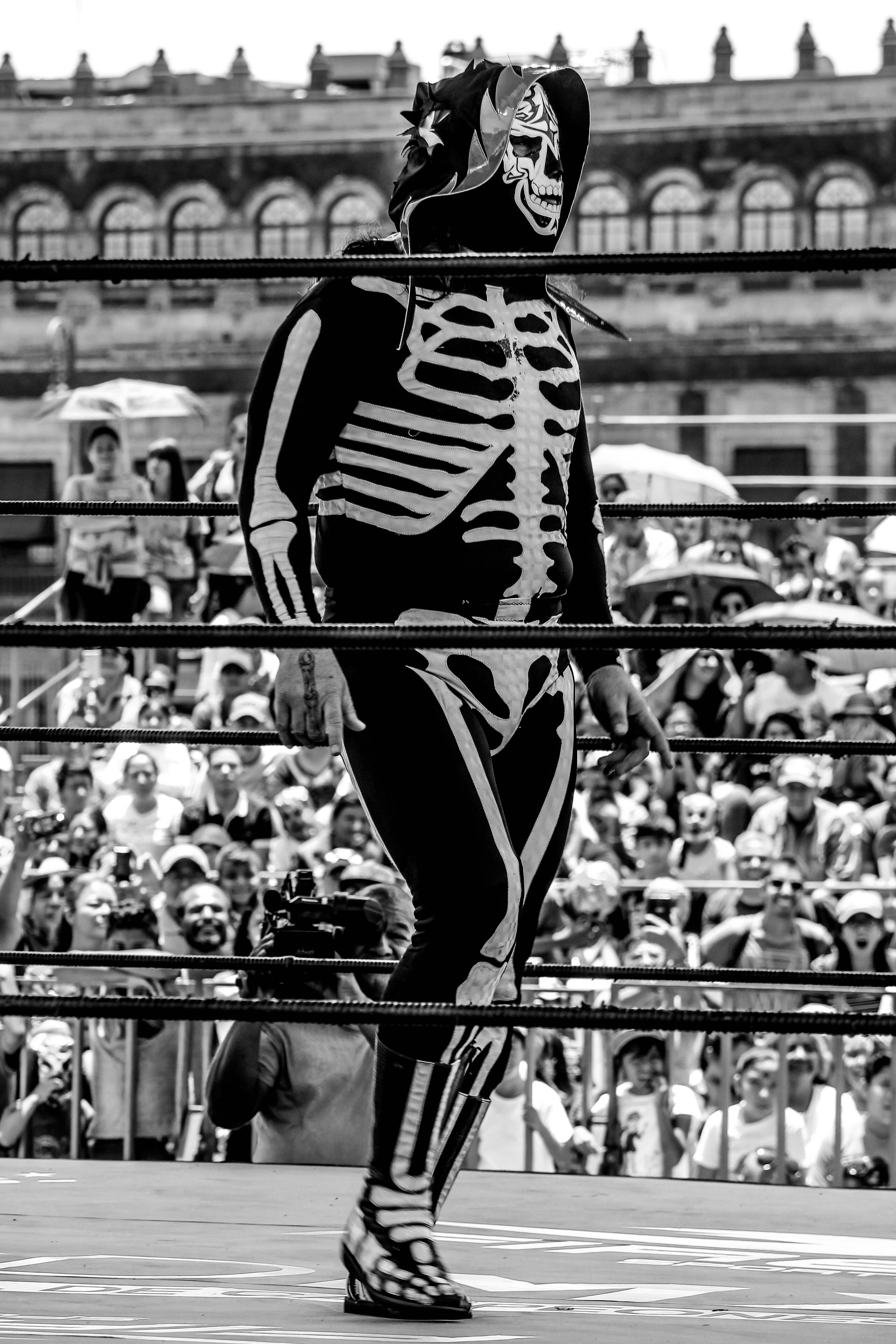
Last champion La Parka Jr.

A total of twelve wrestlers have held the championship throughout its history, with only one person having held it twice, La Parka Jr., who first won the title under the ring name Karis la Momia. The Mexican National Cruiserweight Championship has been inactive since December 8, 2008 when AAA stopped promoting all of their Mexican National championships, in favor of AAA branded championships. They later introduced the AAA World Cruiserweight Championship in May 2009. While the championship has been inactive since 2008, there were plans to revive it in February 2013, when it was announced that Xtreme Tiger would wrestle Rey Astral for the vacant championship on February 23. The match never took place and the championship has not been seen since then. La Parka Jr.'s second reign set a longevity record, lasting 3,591 days, from 1999 until 2008. The shortest reign belonged to Charro de Jalisco, who held it for 65 days. (Note: All title reigns are sourced in the table below.)

== Rules ==
The cruiserweight championship is classified as a "National" title, which means that officially non-Mexican citizens are prohibited from challenging or holding the championship, just like all other Mexican National Championships. The lucha libre commission's official definition of the cruiserweight division in Mexico stipulates that a wrestler must weigh between 77 kg (170 lb) and 80 kg (180 lb) to be considered a cruiserweight. The weight limits have not always been strictly enforced. (Note: The most recent case of this is Mephisto's holding the NWA World Welterweight Championship, a belt with an 87 kg (192 lb) upper limit, despite weighing 90 kg (200 lb).)

As with all professional wrestling championships, matches for the Mexican National Cruiserweight Championship were not won or lost competitively, but by a pre-planned ending to a match, with the outcome determined by the CMLL bookers and matchmakers. (Note: Hornbaker (2016) p. 550: "Professional wrestling is a sport in which match finishes are predetermined. Thus, win–loss records are not indicative of a wrestler's genuine success based on their legitimate abilities – but on now much, or how little they were pushed by promoters") On occasion, a promotion declared the championship vacant, which meant there was no title holder at that point in time. This was either due to a storyline, (Note: Duncan & Will (2000) p. 271, Chapter: Texas: NWA American Tag Team Title [World Class, Adkisson] "Championship held up and rematch ordered because of the interference of manager Gary Hart") or real-life issues such as a champion suffering an injury being unable to defend the title, (Note: Duncan & Will (2000) p. 20, Chapter: (United States: 19th Century & widely defended titles – NWA, WWF, AWA, IW, ECW, NWA) NWA/WCW TV Title "Rhodes stripped on 85/10/19 for not defending the belt after having his leg broken by Ric Flair and Ole & Arn Anderson") or leaving the company. (Note: Duncan & Will (2000) p. 201, Chapter: (Memphis, Nashville) Memphis: USWA Tag Team Title "Vacant on 93/01/18 when Spike leaves the USWA.") All title matches took place under two out of three falls rules. (Note: Comisión de Box y Lucha Libre p. 44 "Articulo 258.- Cada combate de lucha libre tendrá como limite tres caídas; cada caída será sin limite de tiempo, ganará quien obtenga dos caídas de las tres en disputa" ("Article 258.- Each wrestling match shall have as limit three falls; Each fall will be without time limit. The winner will be the one to first obtain two of the three falls in the match"))

== Title history ==
Key
No.	Overall reign number
Reign	Reign number for the specific champion
Days	Number of days held
N/A	Unknown information

No.	Champion	Championship change			Reign statistics		Notes	Ref.
No.	Champion	Date	Event	Location	Reign	Days	Notes	Ref.
Asistencia Asesoría y Administración (AAA)
1	Ángel Blanco	November 13, 1983	UWA show	Mexico City	1	329	Ángel Blanco defeated Insolito in the tournament final	
2	Adorable Rubí	September 7, 1984	Live event	Mexico City	1	747	Some records indicate that Rubí vacated the championship on September 10, 1985, other sources list his reign ending when he lost to Charro de Jalisco on October 24, 1986.	
3	Charro de Jalisco	October 24, 1986	Live event	Mexico City	1	65		
4	Judas	December 28, 1986	Live event	Mexico City	1	92		
5	El Kriminal	March 30, 1987	Live event	Mexico City	1	235		
6	El Macho	November 20, 1987	Live event	Mexico City	1	861		
7	Destructor de Idolos	March 30, 1990	Live event	Mexico City	1	(Note: The exact date on which the title was vacated is not known, which means the title reign lasted between 642 and 856 days as the reign ended on a date between January 1, 1992 and August 3, 1992.)		
—	Vacated	1992	—	—	—	—	Championship vacated due to injuries	
8	Rock el Cavernicola	August 3, 1992	Live event	Mexico City	1	864	Defeated Dinamico in a tournament final	
9	MS-1 Jr.	December 15, 1994	Live event	Mexico City	1	88		
10	Blue Demon Jr.	March 13, 1995	Live event	Naucalpan, Mexico State	1	429		
11	Karis la Momia	May 15, 1996	AAA Live event	Naucalpan, Mexico State	1	170		
—	Vacated	November 1, 1996	—	—	—	—	Championship vacated when Karis la Momia changes his ring character to La Parka Jr.	
12	Kendo	August 7, 1999	AAA Live event	Chihuahua, Chihuahua	1	123	Won a tournament, defeating Salsero in the finals.	
13	La Parka Jr.	December 8, 1999	AAA Live event	Mexico City	2	3,288		
—	Deactivated	December 8, 2008	—	—	—	—	Championship vacated by AAA as they stopped promoting the Mexican National Championships.	
Mexican Independent circuit
—	Vacated	February 21, 2013	—	—	—	—	Match for the vacant championship announced between Extreme Tiger and Rey Astral for February 24, 2013	
—	Deactivated	N/A	—	—	—	—	Championship match did not take place, not mentioned since	

== Reigns by combined length ==
Key

Symbol	Meaning
¤	The exact length of at least one title reign is uncertain.

Rank	Wrestler	No. of reigns	Combined days
1	Karis la Momia / La Parka Jr.	2	3,458
2	Rock el Cavernicola	1	864
3	El Macho	1	861
4	Adorable Rubí	1	747
5	Destructor de Idolos	1	642¤
6	Blue Demon Jr.	1	429
7	Ángel Blanco	1	329
8	El Kriminel	1	235
9	Kendo	1	123
10	Judas	1	92
11	MS-1 Jr.	1	88
12	Charro de Jalisco	1	65
