= EMLL 21st Anniversary Show =

Mexican Professional wrestling show

- Promotion: Empresa Mexicana de Lucha Libre
- Date: September 26, 1954
- City: Mexico City, Mexico
- Venue: Arena Modelo

EMLL Anniversary Show chronology
| ← Previous; 20th Anniversary | Next → 22nd Anniversary |

The EMLL 21st Anniversary Show (Spanish: 21. Aniversario de EMLL) was a professional wrestling major show event produced by Empresa Mexicana de Lucha Libre (EMLL) that took place on September 26, 1954, in Arena Modelo, Mexico City, Mexico. The event commemorated the 21st anniversary of EMLL, which would become the oldest professional wrestling promotion in the world. The Anniversary show is EMLL's biggest show of the year, their Super Bowl event. The EMLL Anniversary Show series is the longest-running annual professional wrestling show, starting in 1934.

== Production ==
=== Background ===
The 1954 Anniversary show commemorated the 21st anniversary of the Mexican professional wrestling company Empresa Mexicana de Lucha Libre (Spanish for "Mexican Wrestling Promotion"; EMLL) holding their first show on September 22, 1933 by promoter and founder Salvador Lutteroth. EMLL was rebranded early in 1992 to become Consejo Mundial de Lucha Libre ("World Wrestling Council"; CMLL) signal their departure from the National Wrestling Alliance. With the sales of the Jim Crockett Promotions to Ted Turner in 1988 EMLL became the oldest, still-operating wrestling promotion in the world. Over the years EMLL/CMLL has on occasion held multiple shows to celebrate their anniversary but since 1977 the company has only held one annual show, which is considered the biggest show of the year, CMLL's equivalent of WWE's WrestleMania or their Super Bowl event. CMLL has held their Anniversary show at Arena México in Mexico City, Mexico since 1956, the year the building was completed, over time Arena México earned the nickname "The Cathedral of Lucha Libre" due to it hosting most of EMLL/CMLL's major events since the building was completed. EMLL held their first anniversary show at Arena Modelo in 1933 and returned to that building in 1937 through 1943. From 1934 through 1936 EMLL rented Arena Nacional for their shows, but in 1944 they began holding their anniversary shows at Arena Coliseo, an arena they owned. From 1944 through 1955 EMLL held all their anniversary shows at Arena Coliseo. Traditionally EMLL/CMLL holds their major events on Friday Nights, replacing their regularly scheduled Super Viernes show.

=== Storylines ===
The event featured an undetermined number of professional wrestling matches with different wrestlers involved in pre-existing scripted feuds, plots and storylines. Wrestlers were portrayed as either heels (referred to as rudos in Mexico, those that portray the "bad guys") or faces (técnicos in Mexico, the "good guy" characters) as they followed a series of tension-building events, which culminated in a wrestling match or series of matches. Due to the nature of keeping mainly paper records of wrestling at the time no documentation has been found for some of the matches of the show.

== Event ==
The only documented match of the 21st Anniversary show was a Super Libre match, which meant that there were basically no rules at all, only way to win was by pinfall or submission. The match was another chapter in a long, very intense and bloody feud between the brawler Cavernario Galindo and the normally more clean, technical Gory Guerrero. The match between the two was so bloody and brutal that the ringside doctor had to step in and stop the match, awarding it to Gory Guerrero as Cavenario Galindo was unable to continue.

== Aftermath ==
The match was stopped due to Galindo suffering a throat injury due, an injury that caused him to speak with a hoarse, raspy voice for the rest of his life as a result. The intense violent feud continued throughout the 1950s, cementing both Guerrero and Galindo's legacy in Lucha Libre.

== Results ==
| No. | Results | Stipulations |
|---|---|---|
| 1 | Gory Guerrero vs. Cavernario Galindo ended in a "no contest" as neither man was able to continue wrestling | "super libre", No Disqualification match |
