= Juicio Final (1975) =

Mexican professional wrestling event

- Promotion: Empresa Mexicana de Lucha Libre
- Date: December 5, 1975
- City: Mexico City, Mexico
- Venue: Arena México

Event chronology
← Previous; EMLL 42nd Anniversary Show	Next →: 20. Aniversario de Arena México

Juicio Final chronology
← Previous; 1974	Next → 1976

Juicio Final (1975) (Spanish for "Final Judgement" 1975) was a professional wrestling supercard show, scripted and produced by Consejo Mundial de Lucha Libre (CMLL), which took place on December 5, 1975, in Arena México, Mexico City, Mexico. The show served as the year-end finale for CMLL before Arena México, CMLL's main venue, closed down for the winter for renovations and to host Circo Atayde. The shows replaced the regular Super Viernes ("Super Friday") shows held by CMLL since the mid-1930s. It is no longer an annually recurring show, but instead held intermittently sometimes several years apart and not always in the same month of the year either. All Juicio Final shows have been held in Arena México in Mexico City, Mexico which is CMLL's main venue, its "home".

Results records have only documented one match on the 1975 Juicio Final show. The main event, a "hair vs. hair" or Lucha de Apuestas match, saw Enrique Vera defeated Alfonso Dantés in a match that also included El Halcón. As a result, Dantés had all his hair shaved off.

== Production ==
=== Background ===
For decades Arena México, the main venue of the Mexican professional wrestling promotion Consejo Mundial de Lucha Libre (CMLL), would close down in early December and remain closed into either January or February to allow for renovations as well as letting Circo Atayde occupy the space over the holidays. As a result, CMLL usually held a "end of the year" supercard show on the first or second Friday of December in lieu of their normal Super Viernes show. 1955 was the first year where CMLL used the name "El Juicio Final" ("The Final Judgement") for their year-end supershow.

=== Storylines ===
The 1975 Juicio Final show featured an indeterminate number of professional wrestling matches scripted by CMLL with some wrestlers involved in scripted feuds. The wrestlers portray either heels (referred to as rudos in Mexico, those that play the part of the "bad guys") or faces (técnicos in Mexico, the "good guy" characters) as they perform.

== Results ==
No.	Results	Stipulations
1	Enrique Vera defeated Alfonso Dantés; also in the match: El Halcón	Best two-out-of-three falls Lucha de Apuestas, hair Vs. mask Vs. hair match
