= EMLL 42nd Anniversary Show (3) =

Mexican Professional wrestling show

EMLL 42nd Anniversary Show #3
- Official poster for the event
- Promotion: Empresa Mexicana de Lucha Libre
- Date: October 3, 1975
- City: Mexico City, Mexico
- Venue: Arena México
- Attendance: 17,500

Event chronology
← Previous; EMLL 42nd Anniversary Show (2)	Next →: 20. Aniversario de Arena México

EMLL Anniversary Show chronology
← Previous; 42nd Anniversary (2)	Next → 43rd Anniversary

Mexican professional wrestling promotion Empresa Mexicana de Lucha Libre (EMLL) celebrated their 42nd anniversary with three professional wrestling major shows centering on the anniversary date in mid to late September. The third EMLL 42nd Anniversary Show (Spanish: 42. Aniversario de EMLL) took place on October 3, 1975, in Arena México, Mexico City, Mexico to commemorate the anniversary of EMLL, which over time became the oldest professional wrestling promotion in the world. The Anniversary show is EMLL's biggest show of the year. The EMLL Anniversary Show series is the longest-running annual professional wrestling show, starting in 1934.

== Production ==
=== Background ===
The 1975 Anniversary show commemorated the 42nd anniversary of the Mexican professional wrestling company Empresa Mexicana de Lucha Libre (Spanish for "Mexican Wrestling Promotion"; EMLL) holding their first show on September 22, 1933, by promoter and founder Salvador Lutteroth. EMLL was rebranded early in 1992 to become Consejo Mundial de Lucha Libre ("World Wrestling Council"; CMLL) signal their departure from the National Wrestling Alliance. With the sales of the Jim Crockett Promotions to Ted Turner in 1988 EMLL became the oldest, still-operating wrestling promotion in the world. Over the years EMLL/CMLL has on occasion held multiple shows to celebrate their anniversary but since 1977 the company has only held one annual show, which is considered the biggest show of the year, CMLL's equivalent of WWE's WrestleMania or their Super Bowl event. CMLL has held their Anniversary show at Arena México in Mexico City, Mexico since 1956, the year the building was completed, over time Arena México earned the nickname "The Cathedral of Lucha Libre" due to it hosting most of EMLL/CMLL's major events since the building was completed. Traditionally EMLL/CMLL holds their major events on Friday Nights, replacing their regularly scheduled Super Viernes show.

=== Storylines ===
The event featured an undetermined number of professional wrestling matches with different wrestlers involved in pre-existing scripted feuds, plots and storylines. Wrestlers were portrayed as either heels (referred to as rudos in Mexico, those that portray the "bad guys") or faces (técnicos in Mexico, the "good guy" characters) as they followed a series of tension-building events, which culminated in a wrestling match or series of matches. Due to the nature of keeping mainly paper records of wrestling at the time no documentation has been found for the results of two of the matches of the show.

== Event ==
The third and final 42nd Anniversary show took place in October, one of the few anniversary shows to not take place in September. The main event was a rematch of the Second 42nd Anniversary Show as El Santo and Perro Aguayo faced off in a singles match. In the previous match Aguayo defended the NWA World Middleweight Championship, but on this night both wrestlers put something much more prestigious on the line as El Santo risked his silver wrestling mask and Aguayo risked his hair on the outcome of their Lucha de Apuesta, or "bet match". While Aguayo retained his title, he was not able to defeat El Santo when the stakes were that much higher, and instead had to be shaved bald after the match.

== Results ==
No.	Results	Stipulations
1	Leo López vs. Chino Chow ended in an unknown manner	Singles match
2	Babe Face vs. Ciclón Veloz ended in an unknown manner	Singles match
3	Alfonso Dantés and Ángel Blanco defeated Dr. Wagner and El Halcón	Tag team match
4	Coloso Colosetti, Fishman, and Raúl Reyes defeated Alberto Muñoz, Cien Caras, and El Rostro	Six-man "Lucha Libre rules" tag team match
5	Ringo Mendoza (c) defeated Tony Salazar	Best two-out-of-three falls match for the Mexican National Middleweight Championship
6	El Santo defeated Perro Aguayo	Best two-out-of-three falls Lucha de Apuesta Mask vs. Hair match
(c) / – the champion(s) heading into the match
