= Juicio Final (1955) =

Mexican professional wrestling event

- Promotion: Empresa Mexicana de Lucha Libre
- Date: December 2, 1955
- City: Mexico City, Mexico
- Venue: Arena Coliseo

Event chronology
← Previous; EMLL 22nd Anniversary Show	Next → EMLL 23rd Anniversary Show

Juicio Final chronology
← Previous; First	Next → 1965

Juicio Final (1955) (Spanish for "Final Judgement" 1955) was a professional wrestling supercard show, scripted and produced by Consejo Mundial de Lucha Libre (CMLL), which took place on December 2, 1955, in Arena México, Mexico City, Mexico. The show served as the year-end finale for CMLL before Arena México, CMLL's main venue, closed down for the winter for renovations and to host Circo Atayde. The shows replaced the regular Super Viernes ("Super Friday") shows held by CMLL since the mid-1930s.

The main event of the first confirmed Jucio Final show saw El Santo further build his legacy as one of the top wrestlers of his time as he defeated Halcón Negro to force Halcón to remove his mask under Lucha de Apuestas ("bet match") rules. Halcón Negro took his mask off and stated that his name was Manuel Quintana. The show included six additional matches.

== Production ==
=== Background ===
For decades Arena México, the main venue of the Mexican professional wrestling promotion Consejo Mundial de Lucha Libre (CMLL), would close down in early December and remain closed into either January or February to allow for renovations as well as letting Circo Atayde occupy the space over the holidays. As a result, CMLL usually held a "end of the year" supercard show on the first or second Friday of December in lieu of their normal Super Viernes show. 1955 was the first year where CMLL used the name "El Juicio Final" ("The Final Judgement") for their year-end supershow. It is no longer an annually recurring show, but instead held intermittently sometimes several years apart and not always in the same month of the year either. All Juicio Final shows have been held in Arena México in Mexico City, Mexico which is CMLL's main venue, its "home".

=== Storylines ===
The 1955 Juicio Final show featured seven professional wrestling matches scripted by CMLL with some wrestlers involved in scripted feuds. The wrestlers portray either heels (referred to as rudos in Mexico, those that play the part of the "bad guys") or faces (técnicos in Mexico, the "good guy" characters) as they perform.

== Results ==
No.	Results	Stipulations
1	Red Man defeated Huroki Sito	Singles match
2	Dientes Hernandez defeated Gorila Macias III	Singles match
3	Apolo Sureno defeated Gordon Williams	Singles match
4	Dr. Edward defeated Orquidea	Singles match
5	Chico Casasola defeated Ed Mangotich	Singles match
6	Rayo Pampero and Tarzán López defeated Carlos Moreno and Cavernario Galindo	Tag team match
7	El Santo defeated Halcón Negro	Best two-out-of-three falls Lucha de Apuestas, mask Vs. mask match
