= EMLL 22nd Anniversary Show =

Mexican Professional wrestling show

- Promotion: Empresa Mexicana de Lucha Libre
- Date: September 16, 1955
- City: Mexico City, Mexico
- Venue: Arena Coliseo
- Attendance: 10,000

Pay-per-view chronology
← Previous; 21st Anniversary	Next → Juicio Final

EMLL Anniversary Show chronology
← Previous; 21st Anniversary	Next → 23rd Anniversary

The EMLL 22nd Anniversary Show (Spanish: 22. Aniversario de EMLL) was a professional wrestling major show event produced by Empresa Mexicana de Lucha Libre (EMLL) that took place on September 16, 1955, in Arena Coliseo, Mexico City, Mexico. The event commemorated the 22nd anniversary of EMLL, which would become the oldest professional wrestling promotion in the world. The Anniversary show is EMLL's biggest show of the year, their Super Bowl event. The EMLL Anniversary Show series is the longest-running annual professional wrestling show, starting in 1934.

== Production ==
=== Background ===
The 1955 Anniversary show commemorated the 22nd anniversary of the Mexican professional wrestling company Empresa Mexicana de Lucha Libre (Spanish for "Mexican Wrestling Promotion"; EMLL) holding their first show on September 22, 1933 by promoter and founder Salvador Lutteroth. EMLL was rebranded early in 1992 to become Consejo Mundial de Lucha Libre ("World Wrestling Council"; CMLL) signal their departure from the National Wrestling Alliance. With the sales of the Jim Crockett Promotions to Ted Turner in 1988 EMLL became the oldest, still-operating wrestling promotion in the world. Over the years EMLL/CMLL has on occasion held multiple shows to celebrate their anniversary but since 1977 the company has only held one annual show, which is considered the biggest show of the year, CMLL's equivalent of WWE's WrestleMania or their Super Bowl event. CMLL has held their Anniversary show at Arena México in Mexico City, Mexico since 1956, the year the building was completed, over time Arena México earned the nickname "The Cathedral of Lucha Libre" due to it hosting most of EMLL/CMLL's major events since the building was completed. EMLL held their first anniversary show at Arena Modelo in 1933 and returned to that building in 1937 through 1943. From 1934 through 1936 EMLL rented Arena Nacional for their shows, but in 1944 they began holding their anniversary shows at Arena Coliseo, an arena they owned. From 1944 through 1955 EMLL held all their anniversary shows at Arena Coliseo. Traditionally EMLL/CMLL holds their major events on Friday Nights, replacing their regularly scheduled Super Viernes show.

=== Storylines ===
The event featured an undetermined number of professional wrestling matches with different wrestlers involved in pre-existing scripted feuds, plots and storylines. Wrestlers were portrayed as either heels (referred to as rudos in Mexico, those that portray the "bad guys") or faces (técnicos in Mexico, the "good guy" characters) as they followed a series of tension-building events, which culminated in a wrestling match or series of matches. Due to the nature of keeping mainly paper records of wrestling at the time no documentation has been found for some of the matches of the show.

== Event ==
In one of only two confirmed matches for the show the masked Halcón Negro ("Black Falcon") faced off against the unmasked Cavernario Galindo ("Galindo the Caveman") in a Lucha de Apuesta, or "bet match" where risked his mask and Galindo risked his hair on the outcome. The match saw Halcón defeat his opponent, two falls to one, and thus forced Galindo to be shaved bald after the match. The other confirmed match saw El Santo defend the NWA World Middleweight Championship against long time rival, Black Shadow. The feud between the two had started years earlier and had seen El Santo unmask Black Shadow in 1951. Santo successfully turned back the challenger, keeping the Middleweight Championship.

== Aftermath ==
El Santo retained the NWA World Middleweight Championship for over another year, until losing the title to Rolando Vera on October 19, 1956.

== Results ==
No.	Results	Stipulations
1	Halcón Negro defeated Cavernario Galindo	Best two-out-of-three falls Lucha de Apuesta mask vs. hair match
2	El Santo (c) defeated Black Shadow	Best two-out-of-three falls match for the NWA World Middleweight Championship
(c) / – the champion(s) heading into the match
