= Vivian St. John =

American professional wrestler (1950 – 2013)

Personal information
- Born: Suzanne Miller; September 10, 1950 Cincinnati, Ohio, U.S.
- Died: December 20, 2013 (aged 63) Fort Lauderdale, Florida, U.S.

Professional wrestling career
- Ring name(s): Vivian St. John, Vivian Saint John
- Billed height: 6 ft 0 in (1.83 m)
- Billed weight: 139 lb (63 kg)
- Trained by: The Fabulous Moolah
- Debut: August 6, 1974
- Retired: 1982

Suzanne Miller (September 10, 1950 – December 20, 2013), better known by her ring name Vivian St. John, was an American female professional wrestler.

== Wrestling career ==
St. John began her wrestling debut on August 6, 1974, and was trained by The Fabulous Moolah. At 6 ft 0 in (1.83 m) and 139 lb (63 kg), she would regularly team up with Sue Green to make a cowgirl tag team. In 1986, she retired from wrestling after falling pregnant with her daughter, Nicole.

== Personal life and death ==
St. John was born as Suzanne Miller on September 10, 1950, in Cincinnati, Ohio. Her brother, Bryan, was also a professional wrestler. She had a later career as psychic Lady Suzanne, reading people's fortunes and contributing to the 2012 book Curses And Their Reversals.

Vivian St. John died following a long illness on December 20, 2013, aged 63, in Fort Lauderdale, Florida. She was survived by her daughter, Nicole.

== Bibliography ==
- Miller, Lady Suzanne; D'Andrea, Maria; Dragonstar; Oribello, William Alexander (2012). Curses And Their Reversals – Plus: Omens, Superstitions And The Removal Of The Evil Eye New Brunswick, NJ: Global Communications. ISBN 978-1-60-611140-6
