= Mrs. Yamaguchi-San =

Japanese professional wrestler and actress (born 1975)

Personal information
- Born: Shian-Li Tsang; October 19, 1975 (age 50) Osaka, Japan

Professional wrestling career
- Billed height: 5 ft 8 in (1.73 m)
- Billed weight: 105 lb (48 kg)
- Debut: June 29, 1998
- Retired: August 1998

Shian-Li Tsang (born October 19, 1975) is a professional Japanese model and former valet for the World Wrestling Federation best known for her stint as Mrs. Yamaguchi-San with Kai En Tai in 1998.

== Professional wrestling career ==
Tsang made her WWF debut on the June 29, 1998 edition of Raw as Mrs. Yamaguchi, the on-screen wife of Yamaguchi-San and Kai En Tai. The stable began a storyline with Val Venis, who had been sleeping with Yamaguchi-san's wife, Kiyoko, with an enraged Yamaguchi-san being shown a pornographic video of the incident. The following week, during a Val Venis match, Yamaguchi-san cut a promo in which he chopped a salami in two with a sword as a threat to Venis that he would "choppy choppy [his] pee pee".

Taka Michinoku turned on Venis during a tag team match against Togo and Funaki, effectively turning heel and joining Kaientai, Mrs. Yamaguchi was also later revealed to be Michinoku's sister. Venis was dragged backstage to seemingly have his penis amputated, which led to the infamous "castration" scene on the 3 August episode of Raw Is War. Venis later explained that Yamaguchi's sword narrowly missed his penis, owing to a "little shrinkage" and some timely assistance from "friend" John Wayne Bobbitt.

After the storyline ended, Tsang left the WWF.

== Filmography ==
Year	Title	Role	Notes
2002	Mary and Joe	Sherri	Film
