= Mighty Jumbo (wrestler) =

American professional wrestler (1923–1974)

Personal information
- Born: Samuel Thomas Hesser; June 25, 1923 Omaha, Nebraska, U.S.
- Died: September 3, 1974 (aged 51) Des Moines, Iowa

Professional wrestling career
- Ring name(s): Mighty Jumbo; Man Mountain Dean Jr.
- Billed height: 6 ft 0 in (183 cm)
- Billed weight: 400 lb (181 kg)
- Debut: 1950
- Retired: 1965

Samuel Thomas Hesser (1923–1974) was an American professional wrestler who competed throughout the United States and Canada as Mighty Jumbo and Man Mountain Dean Jr..

== Professional wrestling career ==
Hesser served in the United States Marines during World War II before he became a wrestler in 1950. He made his debut in Chicago as Man Mountain Dean Jr.

In 1952, he debuted for Maple Leaf Wrestling in Toronto. He lost to Antonio Rocca in a Best 2 Out of 3 Falls match. He stayed in Toronto until 1953 and went to Minnesota.

During his career, he continued to work in New York, Texas and California. At some point in his career, he changed his name to Mighty Jumbo. In 1959, he worked for Capitol Wrestling Corporation in New York City.

He returned to Toronto in 1960. Then in 1961, he began working for Nick Gulas's NWA Mid-America, and continued to do so for much of his later career. In 1965, he worked for Georgia Championship Wrestling, and retired later that year.

== Personal life ==
Hesser owned a tourist attraction known as the Ocala Caverns in his later years.

== Death ==
Hesser died from complications from brain tumor on September 3, 1974, at a Des Moines hospital at 51. He had the tumor for two years.
