= EMLL 41st Anniversary Show =

Mexican Professional wrestling show

- Promotion: Empresa Mexicana de Lucha Libre
- Date: September 20, 1974
- City: Mexico City, Mexico
- Venue: Arena México
- Attendance: 18,000

Event chronology
← Previous; 18. Aniversario de Arena México	Next →: 19. Aniversario de Arena México

EMLL Anniversary Show chronology
← Previous; 40th Anniversary	Next → 42nd Anniversary (1)

The EMLL 41st Anniversary Show (Spanish: 41. Aniversario de EMLL) was a professional wrestling major show event produced by Empresa Mexicana de Lucha Libre (EMLL) that took place on September 20, 1974, in Arena México, Mexico City, Mexico. The event commemorated the 41st anniversary of EMLL, which would become the oldest professional wrestling promotion in the world. The Anniversary show is EMLL's biggest show of the year. The EMLL Anniversary Show series is the longest-running annual professional wrestling show, starting in 1934.

== Production ==
=== Background ===
The 1974 Anniversary show commemorated the 41st anniversary of the Mexican professional wrestling company Empresa Mexicana de Lucha Libre (Spanish for "Mexican Wrestling Promotion"; EMLL) holding their first show on September 22, 1933, by promoter and founder Salvador Lutteroth. EMLL was rebranded early in 1992 to become Consejo Mundial de Lucha Libre ("World Wrestling Council"; CMLL) signal their departure from the National Wrestling Alliance. With the sales of the Jim Crockett Promotions to Ted Turner in 1988 EMLL became the oldest, still-operating wrestling promotion in the world. Over the years EMLL/CMLL has on occasion held multiple shows to celebrate their anniversary but since 1977 the company has only held one annual show, which is considered the biggest show of the year, CMLL's equivalent of WWE's WrestleMania or their Super Bowl event. CMLL has held their Anniversary show at Arena México in Mexico City, Mexico since 1956, the year the building was completed, over time Arena México earned the nickname "The Cathedral of Lucha Libre" due to it hosting most of EMLL/CMLL's major events since the building was completed. Traditionally EMLL/CMLL holds their major events on Friday Nights, replacing their regularly scheduled Super Viernes show.

=== Storylines ===
The event featured an undetermined number of professional wrestling matches with different wrestlers involved in pre-existing scripted feuds, plots and storylines. Wrestlers were portrayed as either heels (referred to as rudos in Mexico, those that portray the "bad guys") or faces (técnicos in Mexico, the "good guy" characters) as they followed a series of tension-building events, which culminated in a wrestling match or series of matches. Due to the nature of keeping mainly paper records of wrestling at the time no documentation has been found for some of the matches of the show.

Then reigning NWA World Middleweight Champion René Guajardo vacated the title in mid to late 1975, although the exact reason for why the title was vacated is not documented. EMLL held a tournament to determine the next Middleweight Champion, with the finals taking place on their anniversary show. The finals saw former champion Aníbal face and defeat El Cobarde to become a two time NWA World Middleweight Champion. After the match Aníbal was presented with the championship by National Wrestling Alliance president Sam Muchnick who had travelled to Mexico City to supervise the championship match. In the main event the masked team known as La Ola Blanca ("The White Wave"; Dr. Wagner and Ángel Blanco) faced the team of the masked Super Star and unmasked Enrique Vera in a best two-out-of-three falls Lucha de Apuesta match where the masked wrestlers risked their mask and Vera put his hair on the line. La Ola Blanca took the victory, forcing Vera to be shaved bald while Super Star was forced to take off his mask and reveal him real name, Armando Lopez.

== Results ==
No.	Results	Stipulations
1	Rizado Ruiz defeated Cesar Silva	Singles match
2	El Marquez defeated César Valentino	Singles match
3	Paco Pardinez defeated Black Shadow	Singles match
4	Adorable Rubí vs. Ringo Mendoza ended in a no contest	Singles match
5	Goro Tanaka and Alfonso Dantés defeated Tony Stone and Tigre Colombiano	Best two-out-of-three falls Tag team match
6	Aníbal defeated El Cobarde	Best two-out-of-three falls match for the vacant NWA World Middleweight Championship
7	La Ola Blanco (Dr. Wagner and Ángel Blanco) defeated Super Star and Enrique Vera	Best two-out-of-three falls Lucha de Apuesta mask and mask vs. mask and hair match
