= El Solitario =

Mexican professional wrestler (1946-1986)

- El Solitario in 1983 with his trademark golden mask

Personal information
- Born: Roberto González Cruz; May 22, 1946 Yahualica, Jalisco, Mexico
- Died: April 6, 1986 (aged 39)
- Cause of death: Cardiac arrest

Professional wrestling career
- Ring name(s): El Hijo del Santo; El Zica II; Othon Banzica II
- Trained by: Joe El Hermoso
- Debut: 1960

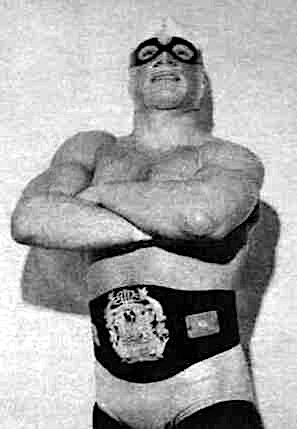
El Solitario in 1972

Roberto González Cruz (May 22, 1946 – April 6, 1986) was a Mexican professional wrestler who wrestled under the name El Solitario ("The Loner"). During his career he held both the NWA World Light Heavyweight Championship and the NWA World Middleweight Championship. After achieving stardom in Mexico's oldest promotion, Empresa Mexicana de Lucha Libre, Gonzalez Cruz joined the breakaway promotion, the Universal Wrestling Association, where he held four more world championships in the early 1980s.

== Early life ==
Roberto Gonzalez Cruz came from a working-class family, and was the youngest of seven children. At the age of twelve, his older brother Jesús, who was also a professional wrestler, began teaching him basic wrestling moves.

In 1959, Gonzalez Cruz's brother was killed in the ring while wrestling as Othon Banzica, but rather than becoming deterred, Gonzalez Cruz drew inspiration from his death and dedicated himself to lucha libre. He began training under the tutelage of Joe el Hermoso and made his wrestling debut in 1960 at the age of fourteen.

== Professional wrestling career ==
Roberto Gonzalez Cruz was initially billed as El Zica II, in honor of his brother, El Zica I. He later changed his name to El Hijo Del Santo, not to be confused with the legitimate son of El Santo that later assumed the mask.

Roberto Gonzalez Cruz moved to Tijuana to pursue his career as a professional wrestler but had a difficult time finding regular work as he was young and still small at the time. He continued working local arenas until he began making a name for himself as he grew physically and refined his wrestling skills. Cruz realized that in order to take his career to the next level, he would have to select a more crowd pleasing name and character. He chose the name El Solitario, derived from the popular comic book character El Llanero Solitario ("The Lone Ranger"'). He also adopted his now trademark gold and black colored costume and golden mask with a fringe around the eyes representing the Lone Ranger's mask. After the change, promoters and fans took notice of the new dynamic wrestler.

On November 16, 1965, El Solitario faced Panchito Ramirez in Arena Coliseo located in Guadalajara. He would make his debut in Arena Coliseo Mexico City on September 6, 1966, when he defeated Tony Reyna. In 1966, El Solitario defeated and unmasked Águila Tapatía, that was followed by a win over Mano Blanca. He won his first world title when he defeated Occident Welterweight champion Luís González.

El Solitario was now working for EMLL, Mexico's largest promotion company. He was catapulted into stardom within the professional wrestling world when he defeated veteran Rey Mendoza in a mask vs hair match on December 13, 1968. A few weeks later, he defeated another legend, Rene Guajardo, and also took his hair in another wager match.

El Solitario formed a wrestling trio alongside Dr. Wagner and Angel Blanco; the group was known as "La Ola Blanca" (The White Wave). He was wrestling as a rudo at this time but when his partners Dr. Wagner and Angel Blanco turned on him, he became one of the most popular tecnicos of his era. It also started a legendary rivalry between himself, Wagner and Blanco. He continued wrestling as an individual during this time, and in 1969, won the NWA Middleweight world title by defeating El Rayo de Jalisco. In 1970, El Solitario won the NWA Light Heavyweight title by defeating Ray Mendoza. In 1972, he unmasked his rival, Angel Blanco, in the ring.

El Solitario was one of the first stars to leave EMLL to join the Universal Wrestling Association (UWA) promotion, which was run by Francisco Flores and Ray Mendoza. He won the UWA's first Junior Heavyweight title in 1982. He also toured Japan in 1972, 1979, and 1981, where he would face and team up with premiere stars such as Tiger Mask and Tatsumi Fujinami, along with other Mexican wrestlers such as El Solar and El Canek. He was unable to fully exhibit his wrestling skills during his tours, as the junior's division formula in Japan consisted of popular Japanese wrestlers facing off against foreign heels. However, he gained a following outside of Mexico as a result of those tours.

While in Mexico, he remained one of the most popular headlining stars throughout the country. In the early 1980s, he formed a short lived trios team with Aníbal and Villano III, the group was known as Los Tres Caballeros that ended when Aníbal turned on El Solitario. He won the UWA Junior Light Heavyweight title in 1980 and 1981. In 1982, he won the NWA Light Heavyweight title. That same year, he participated in El Santo's final career match when he teamed up with legends El Santo, Gory Guerrero, and Huracan Ramirez to defeat El Signo, Negro Navarro, El Texano, and Perro Aguayo. Perhaps his biggest match took place on December 1, 1985, when he defeated and unmasked Dr. Wagner in a mask vs mask match.

== Death ==
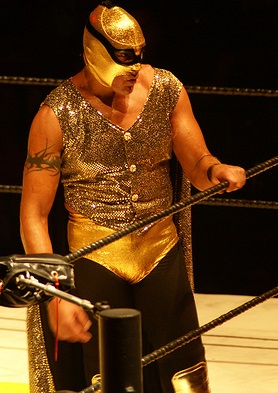
El Hijo del Solitario

El Solitario had suffered injuries during the latter part of his career, resulting in several infections and illnesses. During a match with Fishman, he re-injured himself and was taken to the hospital while complaining of abdominal pain. His doctors initially misdiagnosed his condition, and it was later discovered that he was suffering from internal bleeding that required immediate surgery. On April 6, 1986, at the age of 39, El Solitario died while on the operating table as a result of a cardiac arrest.

Although El Solitario's life was fairly short, his professional career spanned over twenty-five years and he is regarded as one of the greatest Mexican professional wrestlers of all time. He was inducted into the Wrestling Observer Newsletter Hall of Fame in 1996.

His son, El Hijo del Solitario, made his wrestling debut in 1990.

In 2002, El Solitario was ranked at 63 of the greatest professional wrestler of all time in the book The Top 100 Wrestlers of All Time by John Molinaro, edited by Dave Meltzer and Jeff Marek.

== Championships and accomplishments ==
- Empresa Mexicana de Lucha Libre
  - NWA World Light Heavyweight Championship (1 time)
  - NWA World Middleweight Championship (1 time)
  - EMLL Arena México Tag Team Championship (with El Halcón)
- Universal Wrestling Association
  - UWA World Junior Heavyweight Championship (1 time)
  - UWA World Junior Light Heavyweight Championship (2 times)
  - UWA World Light Heavyweight Championship (1 time)
- Wrestling Observer Newsletter awards
  - Wrestling Observer Newsletter Hall of Fame (Class of 1996)

== Lucha de Apuesta record ==
Winner (wager)	Loser (wager)	Location	Event	Date	Notes
El Solitario (mask)	Karloff Lagarde (hair)	N/A	Live event	N/A	
El Solitario (mask)	Coloso Colosetti (hair)	Mexico City	Live event	N/A	
El Solitario (mask)	César Valentino (hair)	Mexico City	Live event	N/A	
El Solitario (mask)	Alfonso Dantés (hair)	Mexico City	Live event	N/A	
El Solitario (mask)	Águila Tapatía (mask)	Guadalajara, Jalisco	Live event	1966	
El Solitario (mask)	The White Hand (mask)	Guadalajara, Jalisco	Live event	June 17, 1966	
El Solitario (mask)	Luis González (hair)	Mexico City	Live event	July 1966	
El Solitario (mask)	Ray Mendoza (hair)	Mexico City	Live event	December 13, 1968	
El Solitario (mask)	René Guajardo (hair)	Mexico City	Live event	December 25, 1968	
El Solitario (mask)	David Morgan (hair)	Mexico City	Live event	April 7, 1972	
El Solitario (mask)	Ángel Blanco (mask)	Mexico City	Live event	December 8, 1972	
El Solitario (mask)	Ángel Blanco (hair)	Guadalajara, Jalisco	Live event	February 3, 1974	
El Solitario (mask)	El Cardenal (mask)	Monterrey, Nuevo León	Live event	March 2, 1975	
El Solitario (mask)	Atila (mask)	Mexico City	Live event	November 19, 1975	
El Solitario (mask)	Destroyer (mask)	Juárez, Chihuahua	Live event	December 5, 1975	
El Solitario (mask)	El Audaz (mask)	Mexico City	Live event	April 12, 1976	(Note: Lost a Relevos Suicidas match vs. Aníbal and Rayo de Jalisco)
El Solitario (mask)	Ku Klux Klan (mask)	Mexico City	Live event	February 9, 1977	
El Solitario (mask)	Perro Aguayo (hair)	Mexico City	Live event	September 10, 1978	
El Solitario (mask)	Máscara Roja (mask)	N/A	Live event	September 24, 1978	
El Solitario (mask)	Bestia Roja (mask)	N/A	Live event	November 25, 1979	
El Solitario (mask)	Nakamura (mask)	Tijuana, Baja California	Live event	March 25, 1981	
El Solitario (mask)	El Faraón (hair)	Guadalajara, Jalisco	Live event	April 6, 1981	
El Solitario (mask)	El Olímpico (mask)	Mexico City	Live event	June 20, 1982	
El Solitario (mask)	El Signo (hair)	Tijuana, Baja California	Live event	June 12, 1983	
El Solitario (mask)	Dr. Wagner (mask)	Monterrey, Nuevo León	Live event	December 1, 1985	

== See also ==
- List of premature professional wrestling deaths
