= EMLL 42nd Anniversary Show (2) =

Mexican Professional wrestling show

EMLL 42nd Anniversary Show #2
- Promotion: Empresa Mexicana de Lucha Libre
- Date: September 26, 1975
- City: Mexico City, Mexico
- Venue: Arena México
- Attendance: 17,500

EMLL Anniversary Show chronology
← Previous; 42nd Anniversary (1)	Next → 42nd Anniversary (3)

Mexican professional wrestling promotion Empresa Mexicana de Lucha Libre (EMLL) celebrated their 42nd anniversary with three major professional wrestling shows centering on the anniversary date in mid to late September. The second EMLL 42nd Anniversary Show (Spanish: 42. Aniversario de EMLL) took place on September 26, 1975, in Arena México, Mexico City, Mexico to commemorate the anniversary of EMLL, which over time became the oldest professional wrestling promotion in the world. The Anniversary show is EMLL's biggest show of the year. The EMLL Anniversary Show series is the longest-running annual professional wrestling show, starting in 1934.

== Production ==
=== Background ===
The 1975 Anniversary show commemorated the 42nd anniversary of the Mexican professional wrestling company Empresa Mexicana de Lucha Libre (Spanish for "Mexican Wrestling Promotion"; EMLL) holding their first show on September 22, 1933, by promoter and founder Salvador Lutteroth. EMLL was rebranded early in 1992 to become Consejo Mundial de Lucha Libre ("World Wrestling Council"; CMLL) signal their departure from the National Wrestling Alliance. With the sales of the Jim Crockett Promotions to Ted Turner in 1988 EMLL became the oldest, still-operating wrestling promotion in the world. Over the years EMLL/CMLL has on occasion held multiple shows to celebrate their anniversary but since 1977 the company has only held one annual show, which is considered the biggest show of the year, CMLL's equivalent of WWE's WrestleMania or their Super Bowl event. CMLL has held their Anniversary show at Arena México in Mexico City, Mexico since 1956, the year the building was completed, over time Arena México earned the nickname "The Cathedral of Lucha Libre" due to it hosting most of EMLL/CMLL's major events since the building was completed. Traditionally EMLL/CMLL holds their major events on Friday Nights, replacing their regularly scheduled Super Viernes show.

=== Storylines ===
The event featured an undetermined number of professional wrestling matches with different wrestlers involved in pre-existing scripted feuds, plots and storylines. Wrestlers were portrayed as either heels (referred to as rudos in Mexico, those that portray the "bad guys") or faces (técnicos in Mexico, the "good guy" characters) as they followed a series of tension-building events, which culminated in a wrestling match or series of matches. Due to the nature of keeping mainly paper records of wrestling at the time no documentation has been found for some of the matches of the show.

== Event ==
The second of three shows to commemorate the 42nd anniversary of EMLL's creation featured a number of matches, with only two of them being verified in sources. The first of two matches saw lucha libre legendary figure Blue Demon successfully defend the NWA World Welterweight Championship against veteran wrestler Karloff Lagarde, who at this point had already held a number of NWA World titles in various weight divisions. Lagarde was unable to add Blue Demon's title to his collection.

The main event was yet another chapter in the long running storyline between Perro Aguayo and El Santo that started in the previous decade. On the night Aguayo was able to successfully defend his NWA World Middleweight Championship, defeating El Santo two falls to one.

== Results ==
No.	Results	Stipulations
1	Blue Demon (c) defeated Karloff Lagarde	Best two-out-of-three falls match for the NWA World Welterweight Championship
2	Perro Aguayo (c) defeated El Santo	Best two-out-of-three falls match for the NWA World Middleweight Championship
(c) / – the champion(s) heading into the match
