= Coloso Colosetti =

Argentine professional wrestler (1948–2024)

Personal information
- Born: Elio Carlo Colosetti Drazich; May 19, 1948 Buenos Aires, Argentina
- Died: November 16, 2024 (aged 76) Mexico City, Mexico

Professional wrestling career
- Ring name(s): Coloso Colosetti; Carlos Colosetti; Tarzán; El Apolo Argentino; El Enterrador; Batman; Maskaraman; El Internacional; El Fantasma Blanco
- Billed height: 6 ft 1 in (185 cm)
- Billed weight: 216 lb (98 kg)
- Debut: 1963
- Retired: 1991

Elio Carlo Colosetti Drazich (May 19, 1948 – November 16, 2024) was an Argentine professional wrestler who is primarily known under the ring name Coloso Colosetti. Colosetti wrestled primarily in Mexico and Southern California, but also worked in Texas, Asia and Europe. Colosetti retired in the late 1990s.

== Professional wrestling career ==
Carlos Elio Colosetti became a professional wrestler in his native Argentina before travelling through all South America, Central America and North to Mexico in order to work full time as a wrestler. In Mexico he often competed under the ring name Coloso Colosetti (Spanish for "Colossal Colosetti") and was a regular on Empresa Mexicana de Lucha Libre (EMLL) shows. On December 19, 1968, Colosetti's singles career peaked when he defeated Ray Mendoza to win the NWA World Light Heavyweight Championship, which at the time was considered the top ranked singles title in Mexico. His reign as the top champion lasted until March 20, 1970, when Ray Mendoza regained the championship. Later on Colosetti worked extensively in Southern California, primarily for the NWA Hollywood territory. While competing in NWA Hollywood Colosetti and Jonathan Boyd teamed up to win the NWA Americas Tag Team Championship from Hector Guerrero and Barry Orton on May 18, 1979, on a show in Los Angeles, California. The team only held the title for one day, losing it to a team known as The Twin Devils on the 19th. Colosetti remained active until the late 1990s, with his last national exposure being him losing a Lucha de Apuesta match to Perro Aguayo on June 26, 1991, and being forced to have his hair shaved off after the match per Lucha traditions.

== Death ==
Colosetti died in Mexico City on November 16, 2024, at the age of 76.

== Championships and accomplishments ==
- Empresa Mexicana de la Lucha Libre
  - NWA World Light Heavyweight Championship (1 time)
- NWA Los Angeles
  - NWA Americas Tag Team Championship (2 times) – with Jonathan Boyd and The Great Yamamoto (1)

== Luchas de Apuestas record ==
Winner (wager)	Loser (wager)	Location	Event	Date	Notes
El Tempestuoso (mask)	El Enterrador (mask)	Central America	Live event	Unknown	
Tinieblas (mask)	El Internacional (mask)	Unknown	Live event	Unknown	
El Canek (mask)	Coloso Colosetti (hair)	Unknown	Live event	Unknown	
El Canek (mask)	Coloso Colosetti (hair)	Unknown	Live event	Unknown	
El Solitario (mask)	Coloso Colosetti (hair)	Mexico City, Mexico	Live event	Unknown	
Rayo de Plata (hair)	Coloso Colosetti (hair)	San Luis Potosi, San Luis Potosi	Live event	Unknown	
Ringo Mendoza (hair)	Coloso Colosetti (hair)	Unknown	Live event	Unknown	
Villano III (mask)	Coloso Colosetti (hair)	Unknown	Live event	Unknown	
Los Gemelos Diablo (hair)	Coloso Colosetti (hair) and Rubí Rubalcava (hair)	Mexico City, Mexico	EMLL 42nd Anniversary Show (1)	September 19, 1975	
Kobayashi (hair) and Saito (hair)	Coloso Colosetti (hair) and César Valentino (hair)	Naucalpan, Mexico State	Live event	September 25, 1981	
Tony Salazar (hair)	Coloso Colosetti (hair)	Mexico City, Mexico	27. Aniversario de Arena México	October 3, 1983	
Perro Aguayo (hair)	Coloso Colosetti (hair)	Matamoros, Tamaulipas	Live event	June 26, 1991	
Coloso Colosetti (hair)	Trueno (hair)	Alfajayucan, Hidalgo	Live event	October 31, 1998	
