= Adorable Rubí =

Mexican professional wrestler

- Carbajal, as Adorable Rubí posing with the Mexican National Middleweight Championship belt.

Personal information
- Born: Rubi Rubalcaba; December 31, 1931 Moctezuma, Sonora, Mexico
- Died: June 23, 2012 (aged 80) Guadalajara, Jalisco, Mexico
- Family: Divino Roy (Nephew)

Professional wrestling career
- Ring name(s): Silvestre Carbajal; Bestia Roja; Rubi Rubalcava/Rubi Ruvalcaba; Adorable Rubí
- Billed height: 1.70 m (5 ft 7 in)
- Billed weight: 96 kg (212 lb)
- Trained by: Jose Rojas; Pepe "Lince" Hernandez
- Debut: December 1965 (No later than)
- Retired: 1989

Ruben Carbajal Lopez (December 31, 1931 – June 23, 2012) was a Mexican professional wrestler who is best known under the ring names Adorable Rubí and Rubi Rubalcava / Rubi Rubalcaba. As Adorable Rubí he was one of the pioneers of the Exótico wrestling style, mixing Cross-dressing with wrestling to create a type or wrestling character that was more sexually ambiguous and self-obsessed. The "Adorable Rubí" character was inspired by Dizzy Gardenia, the first successful Exótico character to compete in Mexico. During his career he won the Mexican National Cruiserweight Championship, Mexican National Middleweight Championship and NWA World Light Heavyweight Championship. While he played an effeminate, self-obsessed character where it was implied he was homosexual, it was never revealed if that was Carbajal's personal sexual orientation as well.

== Personal life ==
Ruben Carbajal Lopez was born on December 31, 1931, in Moctezuma, Sonora, Mexico, son of Manuel Carbajal and Maria Lopez. He had three sisters and three brothers, one of which later became a wrestler but had to retire early due to injuries sustained when he was the victim of an armed robbery. He attended the "February 24" Primary School in Moctezuma and one year of High School before he dropped out to pursue a career in lucha libre (professional wrestling). He had first seen lucha libre at the local El Cortijo Bull fighting arena and later visited Mexico City where he began training at the wrestling school associated with Arena México and Empresa Mexicana de Lucha Libre (EMLL), which was the biggest wrestling promotion in Mexico in the early 1960s. During his childhood Carbajal's idol, along with many others in Mexico, was El Santo. He began his training in 1963, first learning Olympic style amateur wrestling from professor Jose Rojas. During his time training in amateur wrestling Carbajal won several local tournaments. Once he was taught all the fundamentals of amateur wrestling he began training under Pepe Hernandez who taught him professional wrestling.

== Professional wrestling career ==
In an interview in 2011, Carbajal recalled making his wrestling debut in October 1966; but while conducting research for Carbajal's obituary in 2012, SuperLuchas Magazine writer Teddy Baños found records indicating that Carbajal was actually working in December 1965 under the name "Silvestre Carbajal", putting the mistake down to Carbajal mis-remembering the date. In his debut, he lost to veteran wrestler Tony Infante and was paid a total of 37.00 Pesos for the match. Following his debut, EMLL sent him to Monterrey, Nuevo León to work for the local EMLL promoter to gain in-ring experience before returning to Mexico City at some point. In Monterrey, Carbajal got the opportunity to work with EMLL headliner René Guajardo as he worked in the northern Mexico for about two years. For part of the time, he was unable to compete due to a severe injury he suffered during a match with Bulldog Villegas. In 1968, he returned to Mexico City, working as "Rubi Ruvalcaba" now, and put on a series of matches that made him the 1968 EMLL "Rookie of the year" Unfortunately, there were only so many positions on the main show that he found himself only working sporadically in Mexico City.

Working in Monterrey, Carbajal met and worked with El Chamaco Naturalista who used an Exótico ring character. Due to Carbajal's light build and long, wavy hair, Monterre promoter Gory Guerrero suggested that perhaps an Exótico character would work for Carbajal. He later recalled that Chamaco Naturalista offered to teach him ballet to help with his character while Carbajal could teach him Spanish. After a year of ballet and working on incorporating the moves and mannerism into his repertoire, Carbajal was given a beautiful, sparkly ring robe by Chamaco Naturalista prior to his return to Mexico City. In 1971, Carbajal returned to the national level, adopting a brand new ring persona transforming from the serious wrestler Rubi Ruvalcaba to the flamboyant, prissy Exótico "Adorable Rubí", a character he had patterned after one of the original Exóticos Dizzy Gardenia who had worked in Mexico in the 1940s. As "Adorable Rubí", he displayed a very self-centered attitude, more worried about his looks and his hair than his opponent at times and portraying a character whose sexuality was less macho than wrestlers usually displayed. Together with fellow Exóticos El Bello Greco and Sergio el Hermoso, he formed a trio known as La Ola Lila ("The Lilac Wave") that would work all over Mexico, headlining shows on several occasions. The character was such a hit with the audience that EMLL decided to book him in Mexico City full-time, even deciding that he should win the Mexican National Middleweight Championship from then reigning champion Ciclón Veloz Jr. on December 14, 1973. As Adorable Rubí, he would defend the championship for over six months, until it was decided to move the title to Aníbal on June 28, 1974. During the EMLL 41st Anniversary Show on September 20, 1974, he wrestled Ringo Mendoza to a time limit draw. Later in the year, he was booked in a championship match against Aníbal, playing up the rivalry between the flamboyant Exótico rule breaker Adorable Rubí and the popular masked good guy Aníbal as a continuation of the title change earlier in the year. The match was for Aníbal's NWA World Middleweight Championship and took place on December 13, 1974, in a match where Aníbal retained the championship by pinning the challenger. Carbajal has stated in interviews that Aníbal was the first wrestler to defeat him in a Luchas de Apuestas, or bet match, and thus forced the image obsessed character to be shaved completely bald after his loss. At the first of the EMLL 42nd Anniversary Shows, Adorable Rubí and Coloso Colosetti lost a tag team Luchas de Apuestas match to Los Gemelo Diablos ("The Twin Devils") and was once again shaved bald after the match.

In 1976, EMLL decided to book Adorable Rubí as the NWA World Light Heavyweight Champion when he defeated Dr. Wagner on February 27, 1976. The Light Heavyweight championship was considered one of the top championships in Mexico at the time, a step above the Mexican National championship he had won in the past. On April 23, 1976, he teamed up with Alfonso Dantés, losing to the team of Carbajal's childhood idol El Santo and El Halcón, losing to them on the undercard of the 20. Aniversario de Arena México show. On July 16, 1976, Carlos Plata became the new NWA World Light Heavyweight Champion, pinning Adorable Rubí in the main event of an Arena Mexico show. Rubí teamed up with Sangre Chicana for the EMLL 45th Anniversary Show on September 22, 1978, where they faced and defeated El Cobarde and Dragón Rojo in the main event of the show. Following the match El Cobarde and Dragón Rojo were shaved bald as per the Luchas de Apuestas stipulation. During the mid-to-late 1970s, Carbajal teamed up with his nephew who wrestled as the Exótico wrestler Divino Roy ("Divine Roy"). On April 7, 1980, as part of the 24. Aniversario de Arena México show, Adorable Rubí and El Nazi lost to the team of El Faraón and Ringo Mendoza and once again he had to be shaved bald after the match. On Marcy 13, 1981, Adorable Rubí was unsuccessful in his challenge for the Mexican National Heavyweight Championship as he lost to Cien Caras.

In the early-1980s, a new type of Exótico emerged in Mexico, where they were now overtly homosexual, somethings in real life, sometimes only in their ring persona, adopting certain aspects also found in drag queen culture. With the rise in popularity of "out" Exótico characters, such as Pimpinela Escarlata, Adorable Rubí was often called the last "Old School Exótico" character in Mexico. Both during active career and after his retirement, Carbajal expressed his dislike for the "New Exótico" where it was more about the spectacle of the character such as kissing other men as a way of gaining an advantage during a match than wrestling. In 1982, he teamed up with Herodes, El Faraón and Tony Benetto for a four-on-three handicap match against Andre the Giant, Halcón Ortiz and César Curiel during one of Andre's special tours of Mexico, losing to the visiting giant. EMLL decided to give Adorable Rubí one last championship reign in 1984 as he defeated Ángel Blanco to become the second ever holder of the Mexican National Cruiserweight Championship. His career was winding down as he only made one title defense during the 747 days that he held the championship which was a loss to Charro de Jalisco on October 24, 1986. His only known match since 1986 was a Luchas de Apuestas match against Perro Aguayo in May 1989, which resulted in the Exótico being shaved bald one last time.

== Retirement and death ==
Carbajal retired in 1989 and settled in Guadalajara, Jalisco, Mexico where he lived quietly, only occasionally doing interviews about his wrestling past. Carbajal died on June 23, 2012, in his home town of Guadalajara from a Kidney Infection.

== Championships and accomplishments ==
- Empresa Mexicana de la Lucha Libre
  - Mexican National Cruiserweight Championship (1 time)
  - Mexican National Middleweight Championship (1 time)
  - NWA World Light Heavyweight Championship (1 time)
  - Rookie of the year / Novato del Año: 1968

== Luchas de Apuestas record ==
Winner (wager)	Loser (wager)	Location	Event	Date	Notes
EL Bello GRECO (hair)	Adorable Rubí (hair)	Arena Coliseo	Live event	1968	
Aníbal (mask)	Adorable Rubí (hair)	N/A	Live event	N/A	
Dr. Wagner (mask)	Adorable Rubí (hair)	Mexico City	Live event	N/A	
El Fantasma (mask)	Adorable Rubí (hair)	El Pavillón Azteca	Live event	1984	
Super Muñeco (mask)	Adorable Rubí (hair)	N/A	Live event	N/A	
Adorable Rubí (hair)	Paco Pardínez (hair)	Mexico City	Live event	March 1, 1974	
Los Gemelos Diablo (hair)	Coloso Colosetti and Rubí Rubalcava (hair)	Mexico City	EMLL 42nd Anniversary Show (1)	September 19, 1975	
Sangre Chicana and Adorable Rubí (hair)	El Cobarde and Dragón Rojo (hair)	Mexico City	EMLL 45th Anniversary Show	September 1978	
Ringo and Cachorro Mendoza (hair)	Adorable Rubí and Divino Roy (hair)	Mexico City	Live event	June 22, 1979	
El Faraón and Ringo Mendoza (hair)	El Nazi and Adorable Rubí (hair)	Mexico City	24. Aniversario de Arena México	April 7, 1980	
Halcón Ortiz (mask)	Adorable Rubí (hair)	Mexico City, Mexico	Live event	June 18, 1982	
Halcón Ortiz (mask)	Adorable Rubí (hair)	Mexico City	Live event	December 10, 1982	
Ringo Mendoza, César Curiel and Rey Salomón (hair)	Tony Benetto, Herodes and Adorable Rubí (hair)	Mexico City	Live event	December 10, 1982	
Perro Aguayo (hair)	Adorable Rubí (hair)	Naucalpan, State of Mexico	Live event	May 1989	
