= Aníbal (wrestler) =

Mexican professional wrestler (1940–1994)

Personal information
- Born: Carlos Ignacio Carrillo Contreras; November 5, 1940 Topilejo, Michoacán, Mexico
- Died: March 4, 1994 (aged 53)
- Family: El Hijo de Aníbal (possibly son)

Professional wrestling career
- Ring name(s): Aníbal; Carlos Carrillo
- Billed height: 1.78 m (5 ft 10 in)
- Billed weight: 94 kg (207 lb)
- Trained by: Chico Fernández; Salvador Flores
- Debut: November 1963
- Retired: 1993

Carlos Ignacio Carrillo Contreras (November 5, 1940 – March 4, 1994) was a Mexican professional wrestler, known under the ring name Aníbal. Carrillo made his debut in November 1963, adopting the masked character Aníbal, named after the Carthaginian general Hannibal, in 1965. Carrilo's career peaked in the late 1960s and the 1970s as he worked for Empresa Mexicana de Lucha Libre (EMLL) and the Universal Wrestling Association (UWA), winning a number of championships.

Carrillo worked as a masked wrestler until losing his mask to Máscara Año 2000 in a Lucha de Apuestas ("bet match") on December 13, 1991. He retired from wrestling in 1993 and died from a brain tumor the following year. El Hijo de Aníbal (Spanish for "The Son of Aníbal") is billed as Aníbal's son, but it has never been confirmed if he is indeed the son of Carrillo or if he paid for the rights to use the name, a practice not uncommon in lucha libre.

== Professional wrestling career ==
Carrillo began training for a professional wrestling career at the age of 20, training in Gimnasio Baños Gloria and at the Gimnasio San Francisco de Portales under the tutelage of Chico Fernández and Salvador Flores. He made his in-ring debut in November 1963 and earned 40 pesos for the match. After wrestling for two years, Carrillo was convinced by friends in the business that he needed to become an enmascarado ("masked wrestler"), since young wrestlers who were popular wore masks. Carrillo agreed and became "Aníbal", named after the Cartagenia general Hannibal, who had crossed the alps and almost defeated the Roman Empire. Donning a blue mask, trunks and boots, he was positioned as a high flying tecnico ("good guy" or face), quickly earning him the nicknames El Guerrero Cartaginés ("The Carthagenian Warrior") and La Saeta Azul ("The Blue Arrow"); later, he was also referred to as La Furia Azul ("The Blue Fury").

During his early days as Aníbal, Mil Mascaras and Black Shadow acted as his padrinos ("mentors"). In 1966, Aníbal won the Distrito Federal Light Heavyweight Championship, then lost it to Pepe Casas as he signed a contract with Empresa Mexicana de Lucha Libre (EMLL). After years of working his way up the ranks, Aníbal reached his breakthrough year in 1970, defeating Mashio Koma on December 6 to win the NWA World Middleweight Championship and being named El Halcón Magazine's "1970 Wrestler of the year". Aníbal's run with the title, which lasted over a year, saw him successfully defend it in several high-profile main events. During his reign, Aníbal developed a heated rivalry with René Guajardo, which saw the two face off in several main events all around Mexico. On March 30, 1973, Guajardo ended Aníbal's title reign. On June 28, 1974, Aníbal defeated Adorable Rubí to win the Mexican National Middleweight Championship in Mexico City. He became a double champion on September 20, defeating El Cobarde in a match for the vacant NWA World Middleweight Championship. Aníbal's run as a double champion ended when he lost the Mexican National Middleweight Championship on November 29, 1974, to Ringo Mendoza. That same year, his success in the ring saw him named "Wrestler of the year".

In May 1975, Francisco Flores and Ray Mendoza left EMLL to form a rival wrestling promotion called the Universal Wrestling Association (UWA). Aníbal was among the group of young wrestlers that left EMLL to join the UWA, vacating the NWA World Middleweight Championship in the process. There, Aníbal continued his rivalry with Guajardo, losing to him in the finals of a tournament to crown the first UWA World Middleweight Champion. It was not until October 2, 1977 that Aníbal was able to win the title, defeating Guajardo. He retained the championship until Jungla Negra won it from him on February 11, 1979.

By the early 1980s, Aníbal's popularly was still high, especially as he teamed with Villano III and El Solitario to form a trio called Los Tres Caballeros ("The Three Gentlemen"). The trio feuded extensively with La Ola Blanca (Dr. Wagner and Ángel Blanco) until Aníbal turned against his partners, turning rudo ("bad guy" or heel) for the first time in his career and causing El Solitario to team with Dr. Wagner. Aníbal had a series of very intense and bloody matches against El Solitario in a storyline that drew full houses whenever it was on the card and was headed for a high-profile mask vs. mask Lucha de Apuestas ("bet match") between the two. However, the storyline abruptly ended due to El Solitario's sudden death in 1986. Following this, Aníbal defeated El Texano to win the vacant UWA World Junior Light Heavyweight Championship. He then travelled to Puerto Rico for the World Wrestling Council (WWC)'s 11th Anniversary celebrations. On September 15, 1984, he lost the UWA World Junior Light Heavyweight Championship to Invader III, only to regain it not long after. Aníbal also held the WWC World Junior Heavyweight Championship. On January 1, 1985, Aníbal lost the UWA World Junior Light Heavyweight Championship to Negro Navarro, after which he disappeared from the wrestling scene. The years of working full-time had taken its toll on Carrillo's body, forcing him out of the ring due to a multitude of injuries.

Carrillo returned to wrestling in late 1990 for Consejo Mundial de Lucha Libre (CMLL; the renamed EMLL). Despite years away from the ring and cumulative injuries taking a toll on his mobility, he still commanded respect due to his history. Carrillo sought a big payday by losing his mask in a Lucha de Apuestas, as he needed the money. The original plan was for Aníbal to lose his mask to Universo 2000, a wrestler CMLL was building up to be a main eventer, in the main event of Juicio Final ("Final Justice") on December 13. Those plans were changed when promoter Benjamin Mora, who was bitter at CMLL for not working with him, revealed several of CMLL's plans, including who was going to unmask Aníbal. CMLL switched plans and chose Máscara Año 2000, Universo 2000's brother, to unmask Aníbal at the event. Carillo subsequently retired, but returned in 1993 to wrestle a series of matches because he needed the money. By the end of the year, Carrillo was in such poor physical shape that he was forced to retire from wrestling for good. On September 27, Carrillo was on hand as El Hijo del Aníbal ("The Son of Aníbal") made his professional wrestling debut; it has never been confirmed if El Hijo del Aníbal is indeed the son of Carrillo, or if he paid for the rights to use the name, a practice not uncommon in lucha libre.

== Death ==
Carlos Carrillo died of a brain tumor on March 4, 1994, at the age of 53. El Hijo de Aníbal died at age 50 on January 23, 2021, from complications of COVID-19.

== Championships and accomplishments ==
- Comisión de Box y Lucha Libre Mexico D.F.
  - Distrito Federal Light Heavyweight Championship (1 time)
- Empresa Mexicana de Lucha Libre
  - Mexican National Middleweight Championship (1 time)
  - NWA World Middleweight Championship (2 times)
- El Halcón Magazine
  - Wrestler of the year: 1970, 1974 (Note: In the 1970s El Halcón Magazine was the biggest magazine in Mexico, to this date the "Wrestler of the year" award givers list the El Halcón winners as part of the lineage.)
- Panama
  - European Middleweight Championship (1 time)
- Universal Wrestling Association
  - UWA World Junior Light Heavyweight Championship (2 times)
  - UWA World Middleweight Championship (1 time)
- World Wrestling Council
  - WWC World Junior Heavyweight Championship (1 time)

== Luchas de Apuestas record ==
Winner (wager)	Loser (wager)	Location	Event	Date	Notes
Aníbal (mask)	Pepe Casas (hair)	N/A	Live event	N/A	
Aníbal (mask)	El Zar de la Muerte (mask)	N/A	Live event	N/A	
Aníbal (mask)	Gory Medina (hair)	N/A	Live event	N/A	
Aníbal (mask)	El Reo (mask)	Monterrey, Nuevo León	Live event	N/A	
Aníbal (mask)	El Nazi (hair)	N/A	Live event	N/A	
Aníbal (mask)	Hombre de Ultratumba (mask)	N/A	Live event	1967	
Aníbal (mask)	Red Terror (mask)	N/A	Live event	February 19, 1969	
Aníbal (mask)	Joe Panther (hair)	Panama City, Panama	Live event	September 15, 1973	
Aníbal (mask) and Steve Wright (hair)	René Guajardo (hair) and Tigre Colombiano (mask)	Mexico City	18. Aniversario de Arena México	April 26, 1974	
Aníbal (mask)	El Centroamericano (mask)	Monterrey, Nuevo León	Live event	April 18, 1975	
Aníbal (mask)	El Fantasmón (mask)	Iguala, Guerrero	Live event	June 19, 1975	
Aníbal (mask)	Mr. Bruma (mask)	Mexico City	Live event	June 25, 1975	
Aníbal (mask)	El Marquez (mask)	Mexico City	Live event	July 16, 1975	
Aníbal (mask)	El Galeno I (mask)	Nuevo Laredo, Tamaulipas	Live event	October 20, 1975	
Aníbal (mask)	El Remington (mask)	Monterrey, Nuevo León	Live event	February 16, 1976	(Note: This was a triangle match that also included Mazambula.)
Aníbal (mask)	Sandokán (Panama) (mask)	Panama City, Panama	Live event	July 11, 1976	
Aníbal (mask)	La Momia (mask)	Guadalajara, Jalisco	Live event	September 19, 1976	
Aníbal (mask)	Black Jack (mask)	N/A	Live event	December 1976	
Aníbal (mask)	Mr. Power (mask)	N/A	Live event	January 16, 1977	
Aníbal (mask)	Gran Samurai (mask)	Veracruz, Veracruz	Live event	March 2, 1977	
Aníbal (mask)	Mr. Atlas (mask)	Zacatanco, Tlaxcala	Live event	April 23, 1977	
Aníbal (mask)	Jungla Negra (mask)	Monterrey, Nuevo León	Live event	February 18, 1979	
Fishman and Aníbal (masks)	César Valentino (hair) and Kurisu (mask)	Mexico City	Live event	August 10, 1980	
Aníbal (mask)	Gran Hamada (hair)	Nezahualcoyotl, Mexico State	Live event	August 22, 1980	
Aníbal (mask)	El Fugitivo (mask)	Monterrey, Nuevo León	Live event	February 26, 1986	
Aníbal (mask)	Gran Markus (mask)	Monterrey, Nuevo León	Live event	March 18, 1987	
Aníbal (mask)	Pirata Morgan (hair)	Tlalnepantla, Mexico State	Live event	1990	
Máscara Año 2000 (mask)	Aníbal (mask)	Mexico City	Juicio Final	December 13, 1991	
Sandokán (mask)	Aníbal (hair)	Panama City, Panama	Live event	1993	
