= Ángel Blanco =

Mexican professional wrestler

- An unmasked Ángel Blanco wearing a championship belt

Personal information
- Born: José Ángel Vargas Sánchez; August 2, 1938 Atoyac, Jalisco, Mexico
- Died: April 26, 1986 (aged 47) Nuevo Laredo, Tamaulipas, Mexico
- Family: Ángel Blanco Jr. (son); El Hijo de Ángel Blanco I (son); El Hijo de Ángel Blanco II (son); Rey Horus

Professional wrestling career
- Ring name(s): Ángel Blanco; Cruz Diablo; El Gato Negro; El Ranchero Vargaz
- Trained by: Diablo Velasco; Miguel Navarrete
- Debut: 1960

José Ángel Vargas Sánchez (August 2, 1938 – April 26, 1986) was a Mexican professional wrestler best known under the ring name Angel Blanco. Vargas is the father-in-law of the first Ángel Blanco Jr. and the father of the current Ángel Blanco Jr. and Hijo del Ángel Blanco I and II, as well as the grandfather of Horus. Vargas made his professional wrestling debut in 1958 and worked for the majority of his career for the Mexican professional wrestling promotion Empresa Mexicana de Lucha Libre (EMLL). As Ángel Blanco he worked most of his career as an enmascarado, or masked wrestler until losing his mask to El Solitario 1972. Along with Dr. Wagner, Vargas formed one of the premier tag teams of the 1960s and 1970s called La Ola Blanca (Spanish for "the White Wave").

== Biography ==
José Vargas was born on August 2, 1938, son of Francisco Vargas and Francisca Sánchez, in the small town of Atoyac, Jalisco, Mexico. Growing up in Jalisco he became a fan of wrestling, especially because of the wrestling style originating from his country, lucha libre, which was the most popular pastime of the 1930s and 1940s. When he was old enough he began training under famous Jalisco wrestling trainer Diablo Velasco and Miguel Navarrete.

=== Professional wrestling career ===
By 1960 Vargas was ready to make his professional wrestling debut, choosing the name "Ranchero" Vargas as his ring name. In 1962 Vargas became an enmascarado, or masked wrestler, when he adopted the ring persona "Gato Negro" (Spanish for "Black Cat"). His run as a masked wrestler came to an end after less than a year when Vargas lost a Luchas de Apuesta (bet match) to José Gómez and was forced to unmask afterwards. Following his stint as Gato Negro he began working as "Cruz Diablo", teaming with Black Gordman to form Los Hermanos Diablo ("The Devil Brothers").

Vargas worked as Cruz Diablo until Gonzalo González, a promoter in Torreón, decided to rename him Ángel Blanco ("White Angel"), giving him a pristine white mask and outfit. One of Ángel Blanco's early tag team partners was El Enfermero ("The nurse"), with whom Ángel Blanco replaced his previous partner Médico Asesino who had died in 1964.

==== La Ola Blanca ====
In early 1966 Ángel Blanco began teaming with another white clad wrestler, Dr. Wagner to form the team La Ola Blanca ("The White Wave"). The team quickly became one of the most well coordinated, talented teams as the two masked wrestlers' style complimented each other so well. La Ola Blanca began headlining cards all over Mexico, drawing full crowds whenever they faced the top local talent. In late 1969 the team won a several weeks long tag team tournament to earn a shot at the Mexican National Tag Team Championship held by El Santo and Rayo de Jalisco, a team that was virtually unbeatable up until that point in time. La Ola Blanca defeated Santo and Rayo in three very closely contested falls to take the championship. Over the next couple of years La Ola Blanca defended their titles against top teams such as Mil Máscaras and Black Shadow and Los Rebeldes (René Guajardo and Karloff Lagarde). The team were voted Box y Lucha magazine's "Tag Team of the year" in 1966 and again in 1967. Early on in their career La Ola Blanco became a trio when they added El Enfermero but the trio did not last long as El Enfermero was too old to keep up with the intensity of Wagner and Ángel Blanco. La Ola Blanca would become a trio once more when rookie El Solitario joined the group. El Solitario had both the talent and the charisma to keep up with Wagner and Ángel Blanco. Beyond teaming with Dr. Wagner and El Solitario, Ángel Blanco also worked storylines with Ray Mendoza and Dory Dixon. Blanco defeated Mendoza to win the NWA World Light Heavyweight Championship on May 9, 1969, losing it back to Ray Mendoza on Christmas Eve 1968. Ángel Blanco went on to win the Mexican National Heavyweight Championship from Raúl Reyes in 1969. By 1969 the group was the biggest Rudó team in all of Mexico, but El Solitario started to gain quite a following among the fans. El Solitario's popularity only skyrocketed when Dr. Wagner and Ángel Blanco turned on him one night during a match and attacked him. The attack on El Solitario started one of the biggest and longest-running storylines in wrestling, spanning three decades. In 1972 El Solitario defeated Ángel Blanco in a Luchas de Apuesta match, unmasking him in the process. The feud between La Ola Blanca did not slow down due to the unmasking and drew full houses all over Mexico as La Ola faced El Solitario and various partners such as El Santo or Rayo de Jalisco. On October 26, 1973, Ángel Blanco finally lost the Mexican National Heavyweight Championship to Enrique Vera, ending a more than three-year-long title reign.

Following his unmasking Vargas sometimes wrestled as "Ranchero" Vargas, but kept returning to his "Ángle Blanco" name. When the Universal Wrestling Association (UWA) was created by splitting away from EMLL Ángel Blanco was one of the wrestlers who left EMLL and helped make UWA a big hit in the late 1970s. By the late 1970s La Ola Blanca had split up with the two now wrestling each other instead of teaming together, even taking it so far as to defeating Ángel Blanco in an Apuesta match on January 1, 1979, leaving his former teammate bald. On November 13, 1983, Ángel Blanco became the inaugural Mexican National Cruiserweight Champion when he defeated El Insólito in the finals of a 16-man tournament. Blanco held the title for almost a year before losing it to Adorable Rubí on October 7, 1984.

== Death ==
On April 27, 1986, Vargas was scheduled to team with his son to face the team of Dr. Wagner and Dr. Wagner Jr. While driving to Monterrey from Nuevo Laredo the car carrying Vargas, González, Solar, Mano Negra, and Jungla Negra crashed when one of the tires exploded. Vargas, the driver of the car, was killed on impact while González suffered severe spinal damage and was rushed to the hospital for emergency surgery. The remaining three wrestlers, all passengers in the back seat, only suffered minor injuries from the crash. González had to have steel wires inserted into his spinal column in order to stabilize him, but the injury left him requiring the use of a wheelchair. The doctors told him he would never walk again but he would later learn to walk with the use of a cane.

== Family ==
Over the years several members of Vargas' family have become professional wrestlers, most of them using the "Angel Blanco" name that Vargas established. The original Ángel Blanco Jr. was not the son, but the son-in-law of Vargas and was officially allowed to take the name. The original Ángel Blanco Jr. is now known as Rey Salomón as Vargas son took over the Ángel Blanco Jr. The wrestlers working as "El Hijo de Ángel Blanco" ("The son of the White Angel") I and II are also sons of Vargas. In recent years a third-generation Vargas has made his debut, son of the second Ángel Blanco Jr. he works as Horus.

== Championships and accomplishments ==
- Empresa Mexicana de la Lucha Libre
  - NWA World Light Heavyweight Championship (1 time)
  - Mexican National Cruiserweight Championship (1 time)
  - Mexican National Heavyweight Championship (1 time)
  - Mexican National Tag Team Championship (1 time) – with Dr. Wagner
  - EMLL Arena México Tag Team Championship (1 time) – with Dr. Wagner
  - Homenaje a Dos Leyendas honoree (2011)
- NWA Los Angeles
  - NWA Americas Tag Team Championship (1 time) – with Dr. Wagner

== Luchas de Apuestas record ==
Winner (wager)	Loser (wager)	Location	Event	Date	Notes
José Gómez (hair)	Gato Negro (mask)	Iraputo, Guanajuato	Live event	N/A	
Ángel Blanco (mask)	Tony Reyna (hair)	N/A	Live event	N/A	
La Ola Blanca (masks) (Dr. Wagner and Ángel Blanco)	Pantera Negra (mask) and Enrique Vera (hair)	N/A	Live event	N/A	
Ángel Blanco (mask)	Rizado Ruiz (hair)	Mexico City	Live event	May 21, 1967	
Ángel Blanco (mask)	El Ángel Exterminador (mask)	Mexico City	EMLL 34th Anniversary Show	September 29, 1967	
Ángel Blanco (mask)	Raúl Reyes (hair)	Mexico City	Live event	July 28, 1972	
Ángel Blanco (mask)	Ray Mendoza (hair)	Mexico City	Live event	November 10, 1972	
El Solitario (mask)	Ángel Blanco (mask)	Mexico City	Live event	December 8, 1972	
Ray and Ringo Mendoza (hair)	Ángel Blanco and Kim Chul Won (hair)	Mexico City	EMLL 40th Anniversary Show	September 21, 1973	
El Solitario (mask)	Ángel Blanco (hair)	Guadalajara, Jalisco	Live event	February 3, 1974	
La Ola Blanca (Dr. Wagner (mask) and Ángel Blanco (hair))	Enrique Vera (hair) and Super Star (mask)	Mexico City	EMLL 41st Anniversary Show	September 20, 1974	
Ray Mendoza (hair)	Ángel Blanco (hair)	Mexico City	Live event	July 6, 1975	
Dr. Wagner (mask)	Ángel Blanco (hair)	Naucalpan, State of Mexico	Live event	January 28, 1979	
El Canek (mask)	Ángel Blanco (hair)	Naucalpan, State of Mexico	UWA Live event	May 4, 1980	
Ángel Blanco (hair)	Dory Dixon (hair)	Mexico City	Live event	July 26, 1981	

== See also ==
- List of premature professional wrestling deaths
