= Dr. Wagner =

Mexican professional wrestler

- Dr. Wagner after winning the Mexican National Light Heavyweight Championship in 1973.

Personal information
- Born: Manuel González Rivera; April 13, 1936 Zacatecas, Zacatecas, Mexico
- Died: September 12, 2004 (aged 68) Torreón, Coahuila, Mexico
- Cause of death: Heart attack

Professional wrestling career
- Ring name(s): Centella Negra; Dr. Wagner
- Billed height: 1.74 m (5 ft 8 1/2 in)
- Billed weight: 94 kg (207 lb)
- Trained by: Roy Velasco
- Debut: July 16, 1961
- Retired: April 27, 1986

Manuel González Rivera (April 13, 1936 – September 12, 2004) was a Mexican professional wrestler, best known under the ring name Dr. Wagner. González made his professional wrestling debut in 1961 and worked the majority of his career for the Mexican professional wrestling promotion Empresa Mexicana de Lucha Libre (EMLL). As Dr. Wagner, he worked most of his career as an masked wrestler, losing his mask to El Solitario in 1985. Along with Ángel Blanco, González formed one of the premier tag teams of the 1960s and 1970s called La Ola Blanca (Spanish for "the White Wave"). One of his sons works as a professional wrestler under the name Dr. Wagner Jr., and another son wrestled as Silver King until his death in 2019. One of his grandsons made his wrestling debut in 2009 under the name El Hijo de Dr. Wagner Jr. or Dr. Wagner III.

== Biography ==
Manuel González was born on April 13, 1936, in Zacatecas, Zacatecas, Mexico, although later on he would be billed as being born in 1941. The González family moved to Torreón, Coahuila before Manuel turned one, growing up and identifying with the Lagunero area of Torreón. The colorful luchadors who wrestled on Friday nights captured the young González's attention early on. Coming from a poor background, González only went to school for a few years before dropping out to work instead. When he was old enough he began training at Roy Velasco's Gimnasio Hércules in Torreón, all while working on the side to earn enough money for both his tuition and food for his family.

=== Early Career (1961-1966) ===
After training for several years Velasco finally felt that González was ready and arranged for him to make his professional wrestling debut on July 16, 1961. Initially he worked under a mask as Centella Negra (Spanish for "Black Lightning Spark") and would team with Torbellino Negro ("Black Tornado"). In their debut match they lost to the team of Pancho Ramírez and Monje Loco. After wrestling from under a year González came into contact with Elías Simón, who was one of the main professional wrestling promoters in the North of Mexico at the time. Simón suggested that González needed a new ring identity and suggested "El Hijo del Médico Asesino", a storyline son of recently deceased Médico Asesino. González liked the idea of a "Doctor" character but wanted to build his own identity and not live off the name of someone else. After giving it some thought González came up with the name "Dr. Wagner", inspired by the German composer Richard Wagner, and his new ring identity was born. He adopted a white mask, white trunks and boots to go with the Doctor character and made his debut as a Rudo (bad guy or Heel) defeating Rubén Juárez in the main event. Dr. Wagner quickly earned the nickname "El Galeno del Mal" ("The Doctor of Evil") for his brutal style of wrestling and his cheating ways. By 1965 Dr. Wagner was contracted by Mexico's largest promotion Empresa Mexicana de Lucha Libre (EMLL) and worked regularly in Mexico City. Dr. Wagner's position as a main eventer was established when he defeated Raúl Reyes in a Luchas de Apuesta (bet match), mask vs. hair match on July 17, 1966, forcing Reyes to have his head shaved bald after the match.

=== La Ola Blanca (1966-1978) ===
In early 1966 Dr. Wagner would begin teaming with Ángel Blanco under the name La Ola Blanca ("The White Wave"), a name born from the fact that both wore white and overpowered their opponents like a tidal wave. The team quickly became one of the most well coordinated, talented teams as the two masked wrestlers' style complimented each other so well. La Ola Blanca began headlining cards all over Mexico, drawing full crowds whenever they faced the top local talent. In late 1969 the team won a several weeks long tag team tournament to earn a shot at the Mexican National Tag Team Championship held by El Santo and Rayo de Jalisco, a team that was virtually unbeatable up until that point in time. La Ola Blanca defeated Santo and Rayo in three very closely contested falls to take the championship. Over the next couple of years La Ola Blanca defended their titles against top teams such as Mil Máscaras and Black Shadow and Los Rebeldes (René Guajardo and Karloff Lagarde). The team were voted Boy y Lucha magazine's "Tag Team of the year" in 1966 and again in 1967. Early on in their career La Ola Blanca became a trio when they added El Enfermero ("The Nurse") but the trio did not last long as El Enfermero was too old to keep up with the intensity of Wagner and Ángel Blanco. La Ola Blanca would become a trio once more when rookie El Solitario joined the group. El Solitario had both the talent and the charisma to keep up with Wagner and Ángel Blanco. By 1969 the group was the biggest Rudó team in all of Mexico, but El Solitario started to gain quite a following among the fans. El Solidario's popularity only skyrocketed when Dr. Wagner and Ángel Blanco turned on him one night during a match and attacked him. The attack on El Solitario started one of the biggest and longest-running storylines in wrestling, spanning three decades. In 1972 El Solitario defeated Ángel Blanco in a Luchas de Apuesta match, unmasking him in the process. The feud between La Ola Blanca did not slow down due to the unmasking and drew full houses all over Mexico as La Ola faced El Solitario and various partners such as El Santo or Rayo de Jalisco. On March 16, 1973, Dr. Wagner defeated Enrique Vera to win the Mexican National Light Heavyweight Championship. Dr. Wagner held the Mexican National title until September 22, 1974, where he won the NWA World Light Heavyweight Championship, forcing him to vacate the national title. La Ola Blanca travelled to the United States, working in the NWA Los Angeles where they held the NWA Americas Tag Team Championship for a day. Dr. Wagner would also tour Middle America, teaming with El Enfermero to win the Latin American Tag Team Championship while on tour. On May 1, 1975, Dr. Wagner teamed with El Halcón to defeat Los Gemelos Diablo in a Luchas de Apuesta match, unmasking the twins per Lucha Libre traditions. On February 27, 1976, Dr. wagner lost the NWA Light Heavyweight Championship to Adorable Rubí as he and Ángel Blanco were leaving EMLL to work for the Universal Wrestling Association (UWA). Not long after Dr. wagner defeated Alfonso Dantés for the Mexican National Light Heavyweight Championship, a title he took with him to the UWA where he defended it for two years. In 1977 Dr. wagner successfully defended the title against UWA's fastest rising star, El Canek but a year later, on January 15, 1978, El Canek finally won the title.

=== Late career (1978-1986) ===
By the late 1970s La Ola Blanca had split up and Dr. Wagner began feuding with the now tecnico Ángel Blanco, even taking it so far as to defeating Ángel Blanco in an Apuesta match on January 1, 1979, leaving his former team mate bald. Dr. Wagner would briefly hold the Mexican National Light Heavyweight title for a third time in 1973, holding it for 19 days, winning it from Astro Rey and losing it to Enrique Vera. On March 16, 1980, Dr. Wagner teamed with El Texano to face Robot C-3 and Astro Rey in the finals of a "Losers advance" tournament, forcing Robot C-3 to unmask and the already unmasked Astro Rey to have his hair shaved off. In the early 1980s Dr. Wagner was beginning to show his age, working as a tecnico would still be able to produce good matches teaming with El Solitario or Aníbal against Ángel Blanco. When he turned on El Solitario and Aníbal he got one last run as a main event wrestler as a reunited Ola Blanca faced Solitario and Aníbal. On December 1, 1985, Dr. Wagner and El Solitario finally met in a one on one Luchas de Apuesta in the main event of a show that sold out the 15,000-seat Plaza de Toros Monumental in Monterrey, which was the largest and most profitable show in Monterrey up until that point. In the end El Solitario defeated Dr. Wagner, two falls to one and claimed the white mask as the biggest Apuesta win of El Solitario's career. Following his unmasking Dr. Wagner focused on introducing his son, wrestling as Dr. Wagner Jr., to the professional ranks.

== Retirement and death ==
On April 27, 1986, González was scheduled to team with his son for the first time, facing off against the team of Ángel Blanco and Ángel Blanco Jr. While driving to Monterrey from Nuevo Laredo the car, carrying González, Ángel Blanco, El Solar, Mano Negra and Jungla Negra crashed when one of the tires exploded. Ángel Blanco, the driver of the car, was killed on impact, while González suffered severe spinal damage and was rushed to the hospital for emergency surgery. The remaining three wrestlers, all passengers in the back seat, only suffered minor injuries from the crash. González had to have steel wires inserted into his spinal column in order to stabilize him, but the injury left him requiring the use of a wheelchair. The doctors told him he would never walk again, but he would later learn to walk with the use of a cane. Following his forced retirement González kept a keen interest in wrestling, overseeing the careers of his sons Dr. Wagner Jr. and César, who wrestled under the name Silver King. He would also work as a cab driver as well as owning a gym and several pieces of real estate. In early 2004 González had to undergo back surgery to have the wires in his spinal column replaced, improving the mobility in his legs. On September 12, 2004, González suffered a heart attack and died; his death was a surprise to friends and family, as he had generally been in good health.

== Personal life ==
Manuel González married Magdalena Barrón and together they had three sons, Oscar, César (known as Silver King) and Juan Manuel (Dr. Wagner Jr.) as well as a daughter Mayra. Four of González' many grandchildren have become professional wrestlers; El Hijo de Dr. Wagner Jr. & Galeno del Mal, the sons of Dr. Wagner Jr., and the sons of César González Silver King Jr. & El Hijo de Silver King, the former of whom earned the name once he completed his college degree.

== Championships and accomplishments ==
- Box y Lucha Magazine
  - Tag Team of the year: 1966, 1967
- Empresa Mexicana de la Lucha Libre
  - EMLL Arena México Tag Team Championship (1 time) – with Ángel Blanco
  - Mexican National Light Heavyweight Championship (3 times)
  - Mexican National Tag Team Championship (1 time) – with Ángel Blanco
  - NWA World Light Heavyweight Championship (1 time)
  - Occidente Light Heavyweight Championship (1 time)
  - Occidente Tag Team Championship (1 time) - with Angel Blanco
- NWA Los Angeles
  - NWA Americas Tag Team Championship (1 time) – with Ángel Blanco
- Wrestling Observer Newsletter
  - Wrestling Observer Newsletter Hall of Fame (Class of 2013)
- Other titles
  - Latin American Tag Team Championship (1 time) – with El Enfermero

== Luchas de Apuestas record ==
Winner (wager)	Loser (wager)	Location	Event	Date	Notes
Dr. Wagner (mask)	Katástrofe (mask)	N/A	Live event	N/A	
Dr. Wagner (mask)	Adorable Rubí (hair)	Mexico City	Live event	N/A	
La Ola Blanca (masks) (Dr. Wagner and Ángel Blanco)	Pantera Negra and Enrique Vera (hair)	N/A	Live event	N/A	
Dr. Wagner (mask)	Raúl Reyes (hair)	N/A	Live event	July 12, 1966	
La Ola Blanca (Dr. Wagner (mask) and Ángel Blanco (hair))	Enrique Vera (hair) and Super Star (mask)	Mexico City	EMLL 41st Anniversary Show	September 20, 1974	
Dr. Wagner and El Halcón (masks)	Los Gemelos Diablo (masks)	Mexico City	Live event	May 1, 1975	
Dr. Wagner (mask)	Ángel Blanco (hair)	Naucalpan, State of Mexico	Live event	January 28, 1979	
Dr. Wagner (mask) and El Texano (hair)	Robot C-3 (mask) and Astro Rey (hair)	Naucalpan, State of Mexico	Live event	March 16, 1980	(Note: Finals of a losers advance tag team tournament.)
Dr. Wagner (mask)	Septiembre Negro (mask)	Mexico City	Live event	September 19, 1982	(Note: Finals of a Ruleta de la muerte)
El Solitario (mask)	Dr. Wagner (mask)	Monterrey, Nuevo León	Live event	December 1, 1985	
