= 1942 in professional wrestling =

1942 in professional wrestling describes the year's events in the world of professional wrestling.

== List of notable promotions ==
Only one promotion held notable shows in 1942.

Promotion Name	Abbreviation
Empresa Mexicana de Lucha Libre	EMLL

== Calendar of notable shows ==
Date	Promotion(s)	Event	Location	Main event
September 25	EMLL	EMLL 9th Anniversary Show	Mexico City, Mexico	Jesus Anaya defeated Black Guzmán in a tournament final for the newly created Mexican National Light Heavyweight Championship

== Notable events ==
- June 26 – Rodolfo Guzmán Huerta makes his debut as the silver masked ring character El Santo, which would go on to become one of the most famous names in lucha libre as well as starring in over 50 lucha films.

== Championship changes ==
=== EMLL ===
NWA World Middleweight Championship
incoming champion – Black Guzmán
Date	Winner	Event/Show	Note(s)
February 11	Tarzán López	EMLL show	

Mexican National Heavyweight Championship
incoming champion - Firpo Segura
Date	Winner	Event/Show	Note(s)
Uncertain	Rye Duran	EMLL show	

Mexican National Middleweight Championship
incoming champion – Vacant
Date	Winner	Event/Show	Note(s)
May 24	Murciélago Velázquez	EMLL show	

Mexican National Lightweight Championship
incoming champion – Dientes Hernandez
Date	Winner	Event/Show	Note(s)
October 9	Adolfo Bonales	EMLL show	

Mexican National Light Heavyweight Championship
New
Date	Winner	Event/Show	Note(s)
September 25	Jesus Anaya	EMLL show	

Mexican National Welterweight Championship
incoming champion – Jack O'Brien
Date	Winner	Event/Show	Note(s)
March 1	Ciclón Veloz	EMLL show	

== Debuts ==
- June 21:
  - Black Shadow
  - Enrique Llanes

== Births ==
- January 1 – KY Wakamatsu
- January 17 – Muhammad Ali (died in 2016)
- January 24 – Gary Hart (wrestler)(died in 2008)
- February 2:
  - Masa Saito(died in 2018)
  - Rubén Pato Soria (died in 2017)
- February 17 – Seiji Sakaguchi
- March 10 – Tokyo Joe (Joe Daigo) (died in 2017)
- March 15 – The Iron Sheik(died in 2023)
- March 29 – Bob Lurtsema
- April 10 – Kurt Von Hess (died in 1999)
- April 25 – Mr. Hito (died in 2010)
- April 28 – Great Kojika
- April 30 – Devil Murasaki(died in 2017)
- May 2 – Jack Veneno (died in 2021)
- May 23 – Donna Christianello(died in 2011)
- June 12 – Jim Wilson (wrestler) (died in 2009)
- June 18 – Paul Jones(died in 2018)
- June 24 – Rudy Kay(died in 2008)
- June 26 – J. J. Dillon
- July 8 – El Supremo(died in 2010)
- July 11 – Jim White (wrestler) (died in 2010)
- July 15 – Mil Máscaras
- July 21 – Neil Guay
- July 22 – Bob Roop
- August 6 – Jimmy Valiant
- August 8 – Tony Condello
- August 25 – Ivan Koloff(died in 2017)
- September 4 – Jerry Jarrett(died in 2023)
- September 22 – Ole Anderson(died in 2024)
- October 22 – Pedro Morales(died in 2019)
- November 6 – Ken Patera
- November 13 – Walter Johnson (defensive tackle) (died in 1999)
- November 21 – Afa Anoaʻi (died in 2024)
- November 22 – Héctor del Mar (died in 2019)
- November 25 – Blackjack Mulligan(died in 2015)
- November 29 – Gene Okerlund(died in 2019)
