= 1945 in professional wrestling =

1945 in professional wrestling describes the year's events in the world of professional wrestling.

== List of notable promotions ==
Only one promotion held notable shows in 1945.

| Promotion Name | Abbreviation |
|---|---|
| Empresa Mexicana de Lucha Libre | EMLL |

== Calendar of notable shows ==
| Date | Promotion(s) | Event | Location | Main Event |
|---|---|---|---|---|
| September 21 | EMLL | EMLL 12th Anniversary Show | Mexico City, Mexico | Gory Guerrero defeated Bobby Bonales (c) in a best two-out-of-three falls match for the Mexican National Middleweight Championship |
(c) – denotes defending champion(s)

== Championship changes ==
=== EMLL ===
NWA World Middleweight Championship
incoming champion – Tarzán López
No title changes

Mexican National Heavyweight Championship
incoming champion - Rye Duran
| Date | Winner | Event/Show | Note(s) |
| August 17 | Firpo Segura | Live event | |

Mexican National Middleweight Championship
incoming champion – El Santo
| Date | Winner | Event/Show | Note(s) |
| June 1 | Bobby Bonales | Live event | |
| September 25 | Gory Guerrero | EMLL 12th Anniversary Show | |

Mexican National Lightweight Championship
incoming champion – Raul Romero
No title changes

Mexican National Light Heavyweight Championship
incoming champion – Tarzán López
| Date | Winner | Event/Show | Note(s) |
| January | Black Guzmán | EMLL show | |

Mexican National Welterweight Championship
incoming champion – Jack O'Brien
| Date | Winner | Event/Show | Note(s) |
| April 20 | Gory Guerrero | EMLL show | |

== Debuts ==
- Debut date uncertain:
  - Cora Combs
  - Don Eagle

== Births ==
- January 10 – Colonel DeBeers(died in 2025)
- January 18 – Pete Doherty (died in 2026)
- January 19 – Buck Robley(died in 2013)
- February 8 – Sonny King (died in 2024)
- February 17 – Chris Dolman
- February 27 – Bill White (died in 2021)
- March 9 – Cocoa Samoa (died in 2007)
- March 18 – Claude Roca
- March 30:
  - Ronnie Garvin
  - S. D. Jones(died in 2008)
- April 5 – Sika Anoa'i (died in 2024)
- May 28 – Clem Turner (died in 2009)
- May 29 – Fray Tormenta
- June 4 – Johnny Kincaid
- June 14 – Dan Kroffat
- July 30 – Onno Boelee (died in 2013)
- August 24 – Vince McMahon
- August 25 – Bobby Shane (died in 1975)
- September 5 – Jerry Oates (died in 2026)
- October 12 – Dusty Rhodes(died in 2015)
- October 27 – Miss Linda
- October 30 – Ron Slinker (died in 2008)
- November 17 – Snowman (died in 2021)
- November 26 – Victor Jovica
- December 9 – Tugboat Taylor (died in 2017)
- December 15 – Katsuji Ueda (died in 2017)
- December 22 – Toni Rose
