= Consejo Mundial de Lucha Libre Anniversary Shows =

List of professional wrestling shows

CMLL Anniversary Show
- Promotions: Consejo Mundial de Lucha Libre
- First event: EMLL 1st Anniversary Show

The Consejo Mundial de Lucha Libre Anniversary Show - formerly known as the Empresa Mexicana de Lucha Libre Anniversary Show, and officially nicknamed La Fiesta Máxima de la Lucha Libre ("Wrestling's Grandest Party") - is the biggest annual professional wrestling event promoted by Mexican professional wrestling promotion Consejo Mundial de Lucha Libre (CMLL), typically held in September every year, commemorating the creation of CMLL, then known as Empresa Mexicana de Lucha Libre (EMLL), in 1933 by Salvador Lutteroth. Since the mid-1950s, the event has been held exclusively at Arena México in Mexico City (with the exception of the 1979 event); Arena México was built by CMLL's founder Lutteroth and is considered CMLL's home base and the "Cathedral of Lucha Libre". The first event promoted under the Anniversary Show banner was held in 1934 and since then 102 additional Anniversary Shows have been held, making it the longest-running annual wrestling event in history.

== History ==
A year after the first event of Empresa Mexicana de Lucha Libre (EMLL), EMLL's founder Salvador Lutteroth held the EMLL 1st Anniversary Show on September 21, 1934. The Anniversary Show quickly emerged as the biggest event of EMLL's year. Since its creation, the Anniversary Show has been exclusively held in Mexico City — where EMLL was founded — and, since 1955, has been hosted solely in Mexico City's Arena México (with the exception of the 1979 event). When EMLL changed its name to Consejo Mundial de Lucha Libre (CMLL) in 1991, the event was renamed to the Consejo Mundial de Lucha Libre Anniversary Show but kept the numbering of the Empresa Mexicana de Lucha Libre Anniversary Show. CMLL promotes the event as the "Anniversary of Wrestling in Mexico" rather than just the anniversary of the promotion itself. This is solely a promotional statement — several promoters had run wrestling shows in Mexico prior to the formation of EMLL, but Lutteroth was the first to launch a large scale organized promotion and EMLL soon became Mexico's dominant promotion. CMLL remains the oldest active professional wrestling promotion in the world. The Anniversary Show is typically held on a Friday in mid to late September each year, though some editions of the event have been held in August and October.

The show often features high-profile Luchas de Apuestas where the competitors wager their mask or hair; the main event of at least 29 Anniversary Shows have been Apuesta matches. The Anniversary Shows have seen the high-profile mask losses of Mano Negra, Cien Caras, Universo 2000, Black Warrior, Blue Panther, Volador Jr. and Último Guerrero among other wrestlers. A large number of wrestlers have also lost their hair at the Anniversary Show – a notable example being Negro Casas who was shaved bald after losing an Apuesta match against Místico on the 76th Anniversary Show. The Anniversary Show often features guest appearances of wrestlers from CMLL's international partners, such as New Japan Pro-Wrestling, or appearances from other well known wrestlers from the United States, Canada or Puerto Rico.

Due to the long-running nature of the Anniversary Show event series, full results from many of the older events are not available.

== Dates, venues and main events ==
There was no 52nd Anniversary event because of an earthquake that hit Mexico City a day before the September 20, 1985 bell time.

Event	Date	City	Venue	Main Event
EMLL 1st Anniversary Show	September 21, 1934	Mexico City, Mexico	Arena Modelo	La Maravilla Enmascarada vs. Frank Gou
EMLL 2nd Anniversary Show	September 26, 1935	Mexico City, Mexico	Arena Nacional	Eric Bouloff vs. Bobby Segura
EMLL 3rd Anniversary Show	September 27, 1936	Mexico City, Mexico	Arena Nacional	Zimba Parka vs. Tuffy Klein
EMLL 4th Anniversary Show	September 23, 1937	Mexico City, Mexico	Arena Modelo	Jack O'Brien vs. Joe Maynes
EMLL 5th Anniversary Show	September 16, 1938	Mexico City, Mexico	Arena Modelo	Super Libre match: Jack O'Brien vs. Pete Pancoff
EMLL 6th Anniversary Show	September 21, 1939	Mexico City, Mexico	Arena Modelo	Mexican National Welterweight Championship match: Bob Arreola vs. Cíclon Veloz
EMLL 7th Anniversary Show	September 12, 1940	Mexico City, Mexico	Arena Modelo	World Middleweight Championship match: Tarzán López vs. John Nemenic
EMLL 8th Anniversary Show	September 25, 1941	Mexico City, Mexico	Arena Modelo	World Junior Light Heavyweight Championship match: Mike London vs. Gorilla Ramos
EMLL 9th Anniversary Show	September 25, 1942	Mexico City, Mexico	Arena Modelo	Mexican National Light Heavyweight Championship match: Jesus Anaya vs. Black Guzmán
EMLL 10th Anniversary Show	September 24, 1943	Mexico City, Mexico	Arena Coliseo	El Santo vs. Bobby Bonales – Lucha de Apuestas
EMLL 11th Anniversary Show	September 22, 1944	Mexico City, Mexico	Arena Modelo	Mexican National Light Heavyweight Championship match: Black Guzmán vs. Gorilla Ramos
EMLL 12th Anniversary Show	September 21, 1945	Mexico City, Mexico	Arena Modelo	Mexican National Middleweight Championship match: Gory Guerrero vs. Bobby Bonales
EMLL 13th Anniversary Show	September 8, 1946	Mexico City, Mexico	Arena Modelo	Mexican National Heavyweight Championship match: Steve Morgan vs. Firpo Segura
EMLL 14th Anniversary Show	September 24, 1947	Mexico City, Mexico	Arena Coliseo	World Middleweight Championship match: Gory Guerrero vs. Rito Romero
EMLL 15th Anniversary Show #1	September 22, 1948	Mexico City, Mexico	Arena Coliseo	Tarzán López vs. Mike Kelly
EMLL 15th Anniversary Show #2	September 24, 1948	Mexico City, Mexico	Arena Modelo	NWA World Middleweight Championship match: Tarzán López vs. Harry Fields
EMLL 16th Anniversary Show	September 30, 1949	Mexico City, Mexico	Arena Modelo	Tarzán López and Bobby Bonales vs. El Santo and Gory Guerrero
EMLL 17th Anniversary Show	September 21, 1950	Mexico City, Mexico	Arena Modelo	NWA World Middleweight Championship match: Tarzán López vs. Sugi Sito
EMLL 18th Anniversary Show	September 24, 1951	Mexico City, Mexico	Arena Modelo	NWA World Middleweight Championship match: Sugi Sito vs. Enrique Llanes
EMLL 19th Anniversary Show	September 26, 1952	Mexico City, Mexico	Arena Coliseo	NWA World Welterweight Championship match: El Santo vs. Bobby Bonales
EMLL 20th Anniversary Show	September 25, 1953	Mexico City, Mexico	Arena Coliseo	NWA World Welterweight Championship match: Blue Demon vs. El Santo
EMLL 21st Anniversary Show	September 26, 1954	Mexico City, Mexico	Arena Modelo	Super Libre match: Cavernario Galindo vs. Gory Guerrero
EMLL 22nd Anniversary Show	September 16, 1955	Mexico City, Mexico	Arena Coliseo	NWA World Middleweight Championship match: El Santo vs. Black Shadow
EMLL 23rd Anniversary Show	September 21, 1956	Mexico City, Mexico	Arena México	El Santo vs. El Gladiador – Lucha de Apuestas
EMLL 24th Anniversary Show	September 20, 1957	Mexico City, Mexico	Arena México	10,000 Peso Tag Team Tournament finals
EMLL 25th Anniversary Show	September 26, 1958	Mexico City, Mexico	Arena México	NWA World Middleweight Championship match: Rolando Vera vs. Black Shadow
EMLL 26th Anniversary Show	September 25, 1959	Mexico City, Mexico	Arena México	Cavernario Galindo vs. Torbellino Blanco – Lucha de Apuestas
EMLL 27th Anniversary Show	September 23, 1960	Mexico City, Mexico	Arena México	NWA World Middleweight Championship match: René Guajardo vs. Rolando Vera
EMLL 28th Anniversary Show	September 22, 1961	Mexico City, Mexico	Arena México	NWA World Light Heavyweight Championship match: Gory Guerrero vs. Ray Mendoza
EMLL 29th Anniversary Show	September 21, 1962	Mexico City, Mexico	Arena México	NWA World Middleweight Championship match: Antonio Posa vs. Karloff Lagarde
EMLL 30th Anniversary Show #1	September 6, 1963	Mexico City, Mexico	Arena México	Espanto II vs. Ruben Juarez – Lucha de Apuestas
EMLL 30th Anniversary Show #2	September 27, 1963	Mexico City, Mexico	Arena México	Espanto I vs. Ruben Juarez – Lucha de Apuestas
EMLL 31st Anniversary Show	September 25, 1964	Mexico City, Mexico	Arena México	NWA World Middleweight Championship match: Benny Galant vs. Rayo de Jalisco
EMLL 32nd Anniversary Show	September 24, 1965	Mexico City, Mexico	Arena México	NWA World Welterweight Championship match: Huracán Ramírez vs. Karloff Lagarde
EMLL 33rd Anniversary Show #1	September 2, 1966	Mexico City, Mexico	Arena México	Jerry London vs. Karloff Lagarde – Lucha de Apuestas
EMLL 33rd Anniversary Show #2	September 30, 1966	Mexico City, Mexico	Arena México	Jerry London vs. René Guajardo – Lucha de Apuestas
EMLL 34th Anniversary Show	September 29, 1967	Mexico City, Mexico	Arena México	Ángel Blanco vs. Ángel Exterminador – Lucha de Apuestas
EMLL 35th Anniversary Show	September 20, 1968	Mexico City, Mexico	Arena México	NWA World Welterweight Championship match: Karloff Lagarde vs. Blue Demon
EMLL 36th Anniversary Show #1	August 15, 1969	Mexico City, Mexico	Arena México	NWA World Middleweight Championship match: Rayo de Jalisco vs. El Solitario
EMLL 36th Anniversary Show #2	September 19, 1969	Mexico City, Mexico	Arena México	NWA World Middleweight Championship match: El Solitario vs. Rayo de Jalisco
EMLL 37th Anniversary Show	September 1970	Mexico City, Mexico	Arena México	Raul Mata vs. Shibata – Lucha de Apuestas
EMLL 38th Anniversary Show	September 24, 1971	Mexico City, Mexico	Arena México	Rene Torres vs. Ciclon Veloz Jr. – Lucha de Apuestas
EMLL 39th Anniversary Show #1	September 29, 1972	Mexico City, Mexico	Arena México	El Solitario and Ray Mendoza vs. Rene Guajardo and Alfonso Dantés
EMLL 39th Anniversary Show #2	October 20, 1972	Mexico City, Mexico	Arena México	NWA World Light Heavyweight Championship match: Alfonso Dantés vs. El Solitario
EMLL 40th Anniversary Show	September 21, 1973	Mexico City, Mexico	Arena México	Ray Mendoza and Ringo Mendoza vs. Ángel Blanco and Kim Chul Won – Lucha de Apuestas
EMLL 41st Anniversary Show	September 20, 1974	Mexico City, Mexico	Arena México	Dr. Wagner and Ángel Blanco vs. Super Star and Enrique Vera – Lucha de Apuestas
EMLL 42nd Anniversary Show #1	September 19, 1975	Mexico City, Mexico	Arena México	Gemelo Diablo I and Gemelo Diablo II vs. Coloso Colosetti and Rubi Rubalcava – Lucha de Apuestas
EMLL 42nd Anniversary Show #2	September 26, 1975	Mexico City, Mexico	Arena México	NWA World Middleweight Championship match: Perro Aguayo vs. El Santo
EMLL 42nd Anniversary Show #3	October 3, 1975	Mexico City, Mexico	Arena México	El Santo vs. Perro Aguayo – Lucha de Apuestas
EMLL 43rd Anniversary Show	September 24, 1976	Mexico City, Mexico	Arena México	El Faraón vs. Perro Aguayo – Lucha de Apuestas
EMLL 44th Anniversary Show #1	September 23, 1977	Mexico City, Mexico	Arena México	Fishman vs. Sangre Chicano vs. El Cobarde – Lucha de Apuestas
EMLL 44th Anniversary Show #2	September 30, 1977	Mexico City, Mexico	Arena México	Fishman vs. El Cobarde – Lucha de Apuestas
EMLL 45th Anniversary Show	September 22, 1978	Mexico City, Mexico	Arena México	Sangre Chicana and Rubí Rubalcava vs. El Cobarde and Dragón Rojo – Lucha de Apuestas
EMLL 46th Anniversary Show	September 21, 1979	Mexico City, Mexico	Arena Coliseo	Gran Cochisse vs. Américo Rocca – Lucha de Apuestas
EMLL 47th Anniversary Show	September 26, 1980	Mexico City, Mexico	Arena México	El Satánico vs. Mocho Cota – Lucha de Apuestas
EMLL 48th Anniversary Show	September 18, 1981	Mexico City, Mexico	Arena México	Espectro Jr. vs. El Vengador vs. El Supremo – Lucha de Apuestas
EMLL 49th Anniversary Show	September 17, 1982	Mexico City, Mexico	Arena México	Perro Aguayo vs. Tony Salazar – Lucha de Apuestas
EMLL 50th Anniversary Show #1	September 9, 1983	Mexico City, Mexico	Arena México	Gran Cochisse vs. Mocho Cota – Lucha de Apuestas
EMLL 50th Anniversary Show #2	September 16, 1983	Mexico City, Mexico	Arena México	El Satánico vs. La Fiera – Lucha de Apuestas
EMLL 50th Anniversary Show #3	September 23, 1983	Mexico City, Mexico	Arena México	Sangre Chicana vs. MS-1 – Lucha de Apuestas
EMLL 51st Anniversary Show	September 21, 1984	Mexico City, Mexico	Arena México	Atlantis vs. Talismán – Lucha de Apuestas
EMLL 53rd Anniversary Show	September 19, 1986	Mexico City, Mexico	Arena México	Américo Rocca, Tony Salazar and Ringo Mendoza vs. El Signo, Negro Navarro and El Texano – Lucha de Apuestas
EMLL 54th Anniversary Show	September 18, 1987	Mexico City, Mexico	Arena México	Mogur vs. As Charro – Lucha de Apuestas
EMLL 55th Anniversary Show	September 30, 1988	Mexico City, Mexico	Arena México	Máscara Año 2000 vs. Mogur – Lucha de Apuestas
EMLL 56th Anniversary Show	September 22, 1989	Mexico City, Mexico	Arena México	Atlantis and El Satánico vs. MS-1 and Tierra Viento y Fuego – Lucha de Apuestas
EMLL 57th Anniversary Show	September 21, 1990	Mexico City, Mexico	Arena México	Rayo de Jalisco Jr. vs Cien Caras – Lucha de Apuestas
EMLL 58th Anniversary Show	September 8, 1991	Mexico City, Mexico	Arena México	Konnan vs. Cien Caras vs. Perro Aguayo – Lucha de Apuestas
CMLL 59th Anniversary Show	September 18, 1992	Mexico City, Mexico	Arena México	El Gran Kabuki, La Fiera and Pierroth Jr. vs. Rayo de Jalisco Jr., Atlantis and King Haku
CMLL 60th Anniversary Show	October 1, 1993	Mexico City, Mexico	Arena México	Atlantis vs. Mano Negra – Lucha de Apuestas
CMLL 61st Anniversary Show	September 30, 1994	Mexico City, Mexico	Arena México	Ricky Santana vs. El Texano – Lucha de Apuestas
CMLL 62nd Anniversary Show	September 22, 1995	Mexico City, Mexico	Arena México	Miguel Perez Jr. vs. Silver King – Luchas de Apuestas
CMLL 63rd Anniversary Show #1	September 20, 1996	Mexico City, Mexico	Arena México	CMLL World Heavyweight Championship match: Rayo de Jalisco Jr. vs. Gran Markus Jr.
CMLL 63rd Anniversary Show #2	September 27, 1996	Mexico City, Mexico	Arena México	Emilio Charles Jr. vs. Silver King – Lucha de Apuestas
CMLL 64th Anniversary Show	September 19, 1997	Mexico City, Mexico	Arena México	El Hijo del Santo vs. Negro Casas – Lucha de Apuestas
CMLL 65th Anniversary Show #1	September 11, 1998	Mexico City, Mexico	Arena México	Atlantis, La Fiera and Negro Casas vs. El Hijo del Santo, Fuerza Guerrera and Villano III
CMLL 65th Anniversary Show #2	September 18, 1998	Mexico City, Mexico	Arena México	Cien Caras, Máscara Año 2000 and Emilio Charles Jr. vs. Kevin Quinn, El Boricua and Miguel Perez Jr.
CMLL 66th Anniversary Show	September 24, 1999	Mexico City, Mexico	Arena México	Mr. Niebla vs. Shocker – Lucha de Apuestas
CMLL 67th Anniversary Show	September 29, 2000	Mexico City, Mexico	Arena México	2000 Leyenda de Plata tournament semi-final match: Dr. Wagner Jr. vs. Negro Casas
CMLL 68th Anniversary Show	September 28, 2001	Mexico City, Mexico	Arena México	Lucha de Apuestas steel cage match: Máscara Mágica vs. El Satánico vs. Último Guerrero vs. Rey Bucanero vs. Tarzan Boy vs. Mephisto vs. Averno
CMLL 69th Anniversary Show	September 13, 2002	Mexico City, Mexico	Arena México	Negro Casas vs. Tarzan Boy – Lucha de Apuestas
CMLL 70th Anniversary Show	September 19, 2003	Mexico City, Mexico	Arena México	Shocker vs. Tarzan Boy – Lucha de Apuestas
CMLL 71st Anniversary Show	September 17, 2004	Mexico City, Mexico	Arena México	Universo 2000 vs. Canek vs. Rayo de Jalisco Jr. vs. Dr. Wagner Jr. – Lucha de Apuestas
CMLL 72nd Anniversary Show	September 16, 2005	Mexico City, Mexico	Arena México	Héctor Garza vs. Perro Aguayo Jr. vs. Universo 2000 – Lucha de Apuestas
CMLL 73rd Anniversary Show	September 29, 2006	Mexico City, Mexico	Arena México	Místico vs. Black Warrior – Lucha de Apuestas
CMLL 74th Anniversary Show	September 28, 2007	Mexico City, Mexico	Arena México	Lucha de Apuestas steel cage match: Blue Panther vs. Lizmark Jr. vs. Atlantis vs. Místico vs. Perro Aguayo Jr. vs. Dr. Wagner Jr. vs. Último Guerrero vs. Villano V
CMLL 75th Anniversary Show	September 19, 2008	Mexico City, Mexico	Arena México	Blue Panther vs. Villano V – Lucha de Apuestas
CMLL 76th Anniversary Show	September 18, 2009	Mexico City, Mexico	Arena México	Místico vs. Negro Casas – Lucha de Apuestas
CMLL 77th Anniversary Show	September 3, 2010	Mexico City, Mexico	Arena México	Lucha de Apuestas steel cage match: La Sombra vs. Olímpico vs. Místico vs. Volador Jr. vs. Averno vs. Mephisto vs. Ephesto vs. Jushin Thunder Liger vs. Último Guerrero vs. Atlantis vs. Mr. Niebla vs. El Alebrije vs. Histeria vs. Psicosis
CMLL 78th Anniversary Show	September 30, 2011	Mexico City, Mexico	Arena México	Lucha de Apuestas steel cage match: El Felino vs. Rey Bucanero vs. Rush vs. Mr. Águila vs. El Terrible vs. El Texano Jr. vs. Héctor Garza vs. Máximo vs. Blue Panther vs. Negro Casas
CMLL 79th Anniversary Show	September 14, 2012	Mexico City, Mexico	Arena México	Rush vs. El Terrible – Lucha de Apuestas
CMLL 80th Anniversary Show	September 13, 2013	Mexico City, Mexico	Arena México	La Sombra vs. Volador Jr. – Lucha de Apuestas
CMLL 81st Anniversary Show	September 19, 2014	Mexico City, Mexico	Arena México	Atlantis vs. Último Guerrero – Lucha de Apuestas
CMLL 82nd Anniversary Show	September 18, 2015	Mexico City, Mexico	Arena México	Atlantis vs. La Sombra – Lucha de Apuestas
CMLL 83rd Anniversary Show	September 2, 2016	Mexico City, Mexico	Arena México	Dragon Lee vs. La Máscara – Lucha de Apuestas
CMLL 84th Anniversary Show	September 16, 2017	Mexico City, Mexico	Arena México	Niebla Roja vs Gran Guerrero – Lucha de Apuestas
CMLL 85th Anniversary Show	September 14, 2018	Mexico City, Mexico	Arena México	Rush and Bárbaro Cavernario vs. Matt Taven and Volador Jr. – Lucha de Apuestas
CMLL 86th Anniversary Show	September 27, 2019	Mexico City, Mexico	Arena México	Lucha de Apuestas steel cage match: Último Guerrero vs. Negro Casas vs. Bárbaro Cavernario vs. Big Daddy vs. Ciber the Main Man vs. Gilbert el Boricua vs. Volador Jr.
CMLL 87th Anniversary Show	September 25, 2020	Mexico City, Mexico	Arena México	CMLL World Tag Team Championship match: Carístico and Místico vs Rey Cometa and Espíritu Negro
CMLL 88th Anniversary Show	September 24, 2021	Mexico City, Mexico	Arena México	Mexican National Women's Tag Team Championship match: La Jarochita and Lluvia vs Dark Silueta and Reyna Isis
CMLL 89th Anniversary Show	September 16, 2022	Mexico City, Mexico	Arena México	Atlantis Jr. vs Stuka Jr. – Lucha de Apuestas
CMLL 90th Anniversary Show	September 16, 2023	Mexico City, Mexico	Arena México	Dragon Rojo Jr. vs. Templario – Lucha de Apuestas
CMLL 91st Anniversary Show	September 13, 2024	Mexico City, Mexico	Arena México	Místico vs. Chris Jericho
CMLL 92nd Anniversary Show	September 19, 2025	Mexico City, Mexico	Arena México	Esfinge vs. Valiente – Lucha de Apuestas
CMLL 93rd Anniversary Show	September 18, 2026	Mexico City, Mexico	Arena México	
