= 1946 in professional wrestling =

1946 in professional wrestling describes the year's events in the world of professional wrestling.

== List of notable promotions ==
Only one promotion held notable shows in 1946.

Promotion Name	Abbreviation
Empresa Mexicana de Lucha Libre	EMLL

== Calendar of notable shows ==
Date	Promotion(s)	Event	Location	Main event
September 28	EMLL	EMLL 13th Anniversary Show	Mexico City, Mexico	Steve Morgan defeated Firpo Segura (c) in a best two-out-of-three falls match for the Mexican National Heavyweight Championship
(c) – denotes defending champion(s)

== Notable events ==
- Dory Detton starts the Western States Sports professional wrestling promotion based in Amarillo, Texas.

== Accomplishments and tournaments ==
=== EMLL ===
Accomplishment	Winner	Date won	Notes
NWA World Welterweight Championship tournament	El Santo	March 1–15	

== Championship changes ==
=== EMLL ===
NWA World Middleweight Championship
incoming champion – Tarzán López
Date	Winner	Event/Show	Note(s)
February 15	Gory Guerrero	EMLL show	

NWA World Welterweight Championship
New
Date	Winner	Event/Show	Note(s)
March 15	El Santo	EMLL show	Defeated Peter Pancoff in the tournament final to become the first champion

Mexican National Heavyweight Championship
incoming champion - Firpo Segura
Date	Winner	Event/Show	Note(s)
September 28	Steve Morgan	EMLL 13th Anniversary Show	

Mexican National Middleweight Championship
incoming champion – Gory Guerrero
Date	Winner	Event/Show	Note(s)
February 23	Vacated	N/A	Championship vacated after Guerrero won the NWA World Middleweight Championship
April 12	Tarzán López	Live event	

Mexican National Lightweight Championship
incoming champion – Raul Romero
Date	Winner	Event/Show	Note(s)
April 15	Emilio Charles	EMLL show	

Mexican National Light Heavyweight Championship
incoming champion – Black Guzmán
No title changes

Mexican National Welterweight Championship
incoming champion – Gory Guerrero
Date	Winner	Event/Show	Note(s)
February 23	Vacated	N/A	Championship vacated after Guerrero won the NWA World Middleweight Championship

== Debuts ==
- Debut date uncertain:
  - Arnold Skaaland
  - Stu Hart
- June – Enrique Torres

== Births ==
- Date of birth unknown:
  - David Crockett
  - Jose Estrada Sr.
  - Manuel Soto
- January 11 – Haruka Eigen (died in 2016)
- January 18 – Perro Aguayo (died in 2019)
- March 10 – George Julio
- March 14 – Don Bass (died in 2016)
- March 15 – Yoshihiro Momota (died in 2000)
- March 18 – José González
- March 31 – Rich Landrum (died in 2023)
- May 19 – André the Giant(died in 1993)
- May 22 – El Solitario(died in 1986)
- June 18 – Bruiser Brody(died in 1988)
- June 22 – Chris Colt (died in 1995)
- August 16 – Dick Murdoch(died in 1996)
- September 11 – Chabela Romero(died in 1985)
- September 18 – Otis Sistrunk
- September 19 – Jerry Brisco
- September 20 – Tony Garea
- October 4 – Phil Hickerson (died in 2026)
- October 6 – Don Ross (died in 1995)
- October 10 – Giant Haystacks(died in 1998)
- November 15 – Masanobu Kurisu
- November 25 – Johnny Valiant(died in 2018)
- December 6 – Dennis Stamp(died in 2017)
- December 7
  - Billy McGuire (died in 1979)
  - Benny McGuire (died in 2001)
- December 9 – Kato Kung Lee(died in 2016)

== Deaths ==
- June 10 - Jack Johnson (68)
