= 1938 in professional wrestling =

1938 in professional wrestling describes the year's events in the world of professional wrestling.

== List of notable promotions ==
Only one promotion held notable shows in 1938.

Promotion Name	Abbreviation
Empresa Mexicana de Lucha Libre	EMLL

== Calendar of notable shows ==
Date	Promotion(s)	Event	Location	Main Event
September 16	EMLL	EMLL 5th Anniversary Show	Mexico City, Mexico	Pete Pancoff defeated Jack O'Brien in a Super Libre, no disqualification match

== Championship changes ==
=== EMLL ===
Mexican National Heavyweight Championship
incoming champion - Francisco Aguayo
No title changes

Mexican National Middleweight Championship
incoming champion – Uncertain
Date	Winner	Event/Show	Note(s)
February 6	Octavio Gaona	Live event	
September 2	Firpo Segura	Live event	

Mexican National Lightweight Championship
incoming champion – Dientes Hernandez
Date	Winner	Event/Show	Note(s)
May 18	Jack O'Brien	EMLL show	

Mexican National Welterweight Championship
incoming champion – Tarzán López
No title changes

Mexican National Featherweight Championship
New
Date	Winner	Event/Show	Note(s)
February 25	Luis Robles	EMLL show	

== Debuts ==
- Debut date uncertain:
  - Maria Bernardi
  - Al Costello
  - Cavernario Galindo
  - Maurice Tillet
- April 3 – Murciélago Velázquez

== Births ==
- January 10 – Steve Veidor
- January 15 – Estrella Blanca (died in 2021)
- January 21 – Sandy Barr(died in 2007)
- January 23 – Giant Baba(died in 1999)
- March 1 – Chris Markoff (died in 2024)
- March 25 – Seigfried Stanke (died in 2012)
- April 22 – Omar Atlas
- April 28 – Argentina Apollo (died in 1984)
- May 16 – Johnny Rodz
- June 4 – Wrestling Pro (died in 2019)
- June 19 – Wahoo McDaniel(died in 2002)
- July 25 – Freddie Sweetan (died in 1974)
- August 2 – Ángel Blanco(died in 1986)
- August 13 – Brian Maxine (died in 2024)
- August 28 – Jody Hamilton (died in 2021)
- September 18 – Billy Robinson(died in 2014)
- September 24 – Tommy Seigler (died in 2023)
- September 29 – Ann Casey (died in 2021)
- October 16 – Bulldog Bob Brown (died in 1997)
- October 26 – Ron Wright (died in 2015)
- November 3 – The Beast(died in 2009)
- November 19 – Ted Turner(died in 2026)
- November 25 – Ganetetsu Matsuoka
- November 28 – Ernie Ladd(died in 2007)
- December 16 – Sweet Georgia Brown (wrestler) (died in 1989)
- December 29 – Harvey Smith

== Deaths ==
- June 10 – Frank Speer (31)
