= 1937 in professional wrestling =

Footage of a professional wrestling match taking place in Manchester, England in 1937

1937 in professional wrestling describes the year's events in the world of professional wrestling.

== List of notable promotions ==
Only one promotion held notable shows in 1937.

Promotion Name	Abbreviation
Empresa Mexicana de Lucha Libre	EMLL

== Calendar of notable shows ==
Date	Promotion(s)	Event	Location	Main event
September 23	EMLL	EMLL 4th Anniversary Show	Mexico City, Mexico	Jack O'Brien defeated Joe Maynes in a singles match

== Championship changes ==
=== EMLL ===
Mexican National Heavyweight Championship
incoming champion - Francisco Aguayo
Date	Winner	Event/Show	Note(s)
June	Yaqui Joe	Live event	
July 1	Francisco Aguayo	Live event	

Mexican National Middleweight Championship
incoming champion – Uncertain
No title changes

Mexican National Lightweight Championship
incoming champion – Jack O'Brien
Date	Winner	Event/Show	Note(s)
June 28	Dientes Hernandez	EMLL show	

Mexican National Welterweight Championship
incoming champion – Tarzán López
No title changes

== Debuts ==
- Debut date uncertain:
  - John Dempsey
  - Kurt Von Poppenheim
  - Diablo Velazco
- September 15 – Gory Guerrero

== Births ==
- Date of birth uncertain:
  - Paul DeMarco
- January 1:
  - Jack Reynolds (died in 2008)
  - Doug Gashouse Gilbert (died in 2013)
- January 30 – Frank Durso (died in 2018)
- February 13 – Angelo Mosca (died in 2021)
- February 26 – Mark Lewin
- March 9 – Tor Kamata(died in 2007)
- March 27 – Kenny Jay (died in 2023)
- April 6
  - Danny Babich (died in 2008)
  - Peter Maivia(died in 1982)
- April 7 – Miguel Perez (died in 2005)
- April 9 – Terry Garvin(died in 1998)
- April 13 Stan Stasiak(died in 1997)
- April 16 – George Steele(died in 2017)
- May 3 – Erich Froelich (died in 2023)
- May 19 – Pat Roach(died in 2004)
- June 4 – Gorilla Monsoon(died in 1999)
- June 30 – Tom Andrews (wrestler) (died in 2020)
- July 22 – Hiro Matsuda(died in 1999)
- August 3 – Bull Ramos(died in 2006)
- August 16 – Uncle Elmer(died in 1992)
- September 13 – Danny Little Bear(died in 1991)
- September 15 – King Curtis Iaukea (died in 2010)
- September 30 – Zivko Kovacic
- October 7 – Butcher Vachon (died in 2024)
- November 26 – Bob Babbitt (died in 2012)
- December 12 – Buford Pusser (died in 1974)

== Deaths ==
- January 8 – Farmer Burns (75)
- July 12 – Jack Curley (61)
- December 22 – Jake Kilrain (78)
