= 9th Anniversary Show =

9th Anniversary Show may refer to:

- EMLL 9th Anniversary Show
- ROH 9th Anniversary Show
