= 11th Anniversary Show =

11th Anniversary Show may refer to:

- EMLL 11th Anniversary Show
- ROH 11th Anniversary Show
