= 12th Anniversary Show =

12th Anniversary Show may refer to:

- EMLL 12th Anniversary Show
- ROH 12th Anniversary Show
