= EMLL 7th Anniversary Show =

Mexican Professional wrestling show

- Promotion: Empresa Mexicana de Lucha Libre
- Date: September 12, 1940
- City: Mexico City, Mexico
- Venue: Arena Modelo

EMLL Anniversary Shows chronology
← Previous; 6th Anniversary	Next → 8th Anniversary

The EMLL 7th Anniversary Show (Spanish: 7. Aniversario de EMLL) was a professional wrestling major show event produced by Empresa Mexicana de Lucha Libre (EMLL, later renamed Consejo Mundial de Lucha Libre, CMLL) that took place on September 12, 1940, in Arena Modelo (In the same location Arena México was built years later), in Mexico City, Mexico. The event commemorated the seventh anniversary of EMLL, which would become the oldest still active professional wrestling promotion in the world. The Anniversary show is EMLL's biggest show of the year, and it is their Super Bowl event. The EMLL Anniversary Show series is the longest-running annual professional wrestling show, starting in 1934.

== Production ==
=== Background ===
The 1940 Anniversary show commemorated the 7th anniversary of the Mexican professional wrestling company Empresa Mexicana de Lucha Libre (Spanish for "Mexican Wrestling Promotion"; EMLL) holding their first show on September 22, 1933 by the promoter and founder Salvador Lutteroth. EMLL was rebranded early in 1992 to become Consejo Mundial de Lucha Libre ("World Wrestling Council"; CMLL) signal their departure from the National Wrestling Alliance. With the sales of the Jim Crockett Promotions to Ted Turner in 1988 EMLL became the oldest, still-operating wrestling promotion in the world. Over the years EMLL/CMLL has on occasion held multiple shows to celebrate their anniversary but since 1977 the company has only held one annual show, which is considered the biggest show of the year, CMLL's equivalent of WWE's WrestleMania or their Super Bowl event. CMLL has held its Anniversary show at Arena México in Mexico City, Mexico since 1956, the year the building was completed, over time Arena México earned the nickname "The Cathedral of Lucha Libre" due to it hosting most of EMLL/CMLL's major events since the building was completed. EMLL held their first anniversary show at Arena Modelo in 1933 and returned to that building in 1937 through 1943. From 1934 through 1936 EMLL rented Arena Nacional for their shows, but in 1944 they began holding their anniversary shows at Arena Coliseo, an arena they owned. From 1944 through 1955 EMLL held all their anniversary shows at Arena Coliseo. Traditionally EMLL/CMLL holds their major events on Friday Nights, replacing their regularly scheduled Super Viernes show.

=== Storylines ===
The event featured an undetermined number of professional wrestling matches with different wrestlers involved in pre-existing scripted feuds, plots and storylines. Wrestlers were portrayed as either heels (referred to as rudos in Mexico, those that portray the "bad guys") or faces (técnicos in Mexico, the "good guy" characters) as they followed a series of tension-building events, which culminated in a wrestling match or series of matches. Due to the nature of keeping mainly paper records of wrestling at the time no documentation has been found for some of the matches of the show.

== Event ==
Records of most of the early anniversary shows are not found, only two of the matches are documented. In the first documented match Firpo Segura and Gorilla Macias teamed up to defeat Tony Fellitto and El Tigre Ray Ryan. This match was one of the earliest tag team matches promoted in Mexico, tag team wrestling had not become popular until the 1930s in the United States and was slowly becoming a regular occurrence in Mexico. In the main event Tarzán López defended the Mexican version of the World Middleweight Championship (Later given the National Wrestling Alliance (NWA) brand) against John Nemenic marking the first time a "world title" was defended on an anniversary show.

== Results ==
No.	Results	Stipulations
1	Firpo Segura and Gorilla Macias defeated Tony Fellitto and "Tigre" Ray Ryan	Tag team match
2	Tarzán López (c) defeated John Nemenic	Two-out-of-three falls match for the World Middleweight Championship
(c) / – the champion(s) heading into the match
