= 13th Anniversary Show =

13th Anniversary Show may refer to:

- EMLL 13th Anniversary Show
- ROH 13th Anniversary Show
