= EMLL 10th Anniversary Show =

Mexican Professional wrestling show

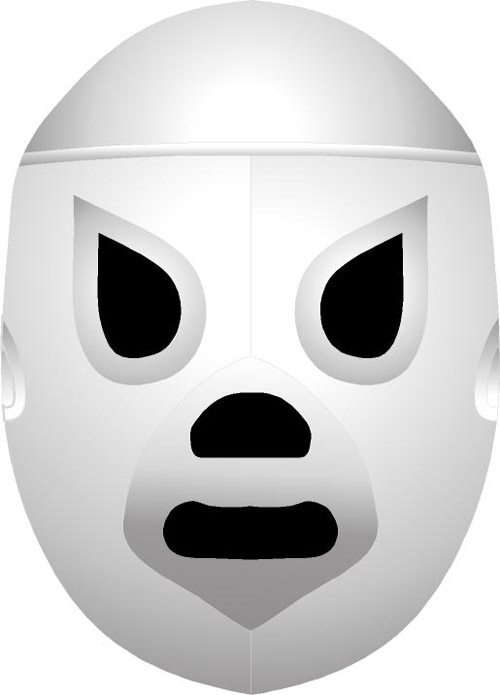
- The mask of El Santo, which was on the line in the main event
- Promotion: Empresa Mexicana de Lucha Libre
- Date: September 24, 1943
- City: Mexico City, Mexico
- Venue: Arena Coliseo
- Attendance: 10,000 (sold out)

EMLL Anniversary Shows chronology
← Previous; 9th Anniversary	Next → 11th Anniversary

The EMLL 10th Anniversary Show (Spanish: 10. Aniversario de EMLL) was a professional wrestling major show event produced by Empresa Mexicana de Lucha Libre (EMLL, later renamed Consejo Mundial de Lucha Libre, CMLL) that took place on September 24, 1943, in Arena Coliseo, in Mexico City, Mexico. The event commemorated the tenth anniversary of EMLL, which would become the oldest still active professional wrestling promotion in the world. The Anniversary show is EMLL's biggest show of the year, their Super Bowl event. The EMLL Anniversary Show series is the longest-running annual professional wrestling show, starting in 1934.

This was the first Anniversary show to take place in the recently built Arena Coloseo that opened in April 1943 and was the first arena built specifically for professional wrestling in Mexico and the first sports building in Mexico to have built-in air conditioning.

== Production ==
=== Background ===
The 1943 Anniversary show commemorated the 10th anniversary of the Mexican professional wrestling company Empresa Mexicana de Lucha Libre (Spanish for "Mexican Wrestling Promotion"; EMLL) holding their first show on September 22, 1933 by promoter and founder Salvador Lutteroth. EMLL was rebranded early in 1992 to become Consejo Mundial de Lucha Libre ("World Wrestling Council"; CMLL) signal their departure from the National Wrestling Alliance. With the sales of the Jim Crockett Promotions to Ted Turner in 1988 EMLL became the oldest, still-operating wrestling promotion in the world. Over the years EMLL/CMLL has on occasion held multiple shows to celebrate their anniversary but since 1977 the company has only held one annual show, which is considered the biggest show of the year, CMLL's equivalent of WWE's WrestleMania or their Super Bowl event. CMLL has held their Anniversary show at Arena México in Mexico City, Mexico since 1956, the year the building was completed, over time Arena México earned the nickname "The Cathedral of Lucha Libre" due to it hosting most of EMLL/CMLL's major events since the building was completed. EMLL held their first anniversary show at Arena Modelo in 1933 and returned to that building in 1937 through 1943. From 1934 through 1936 EMLL rented Arena Nacional for their shows, but in 1944 they began holding their anniversary shows at Arena Coliseo, an arena they owned. From 1944 through 1955 EMLL held all their anniversary shows at Arena Coliseo. Traditionally EMLL/CMLL holds their major events on Friday Nights, replacing their regularly scheduled Super Viernes show.

=== Storylines ===
The event featured an undetermined number of professional wrestling matches with different wrestlers involved in pre-existing scripted feuds, plots and storylines. Wrestlers were portrayed as either heels (referred to as rudos in Mexico, those that portray the "bad guys") or faces (técnicos in Mexico, the "good guy" characters) as they followed a series of tension-building events, which culminated in a wrestling match or series of matches. Due to the nature of keeping mainly paper records of wrestling at the time no documentation has been found for some of the matches of the show.

== Event ==
Records of most of the early anniversary shows are not found, only one of the matches was documented. The show was the first Anniversary Show to take place in Arena Coliseo, EMLL's new main building, replacing the aging Arena Modelo. The main event of the 10th Anniversary show was one of the earliest Lucha de Apuesta ("Bet match") ever held. The Luchas de Apuestas concept had only been invented a few years previously, on July 14, 1940 and was considered a special attraction match. The Apuesta match was the first such match on an Anniversary shows and one of the earliest of El Santo's career, with the victory over Bobby Bonales was one of the early victories that helped establish El Santo as a star in Mexico. Following the match Bobby Bonales had to have all his hair shaved off as per the Luchas de Apuestas stipulation.

== Results ==
No.	Results	Stipulations
1	El Santo defeated Bobby Bonales	Best two-out-of-three falls Lucha de Apuesta, mask vs. hair match
