= Don Ross (bodybuilder) =

American professional bodybuilder

Don Z. Ross
- ♂ Professional bodybuilder

Personal info
- Born: October 6, 1946; Detroit, Michigan, U.S.
- Died: June 2, 1995 (aged 48); California, U.S.

Best statistics

Don Z. Ross (October 6, 1946 – June 2, 1995) was a professional bodybuilder, wrestler and weight training coach from California. He performed under the names Ripper Savage and The Bronx Barbarian.

Ross was a professional bodybuilder, born in Detroit, Michigan. From 1979 until his death in 1995, he was a popular writer, story teller, and advocate of all bodybuilders and strength athletes.

== Books ==
- Fundamentals of Bodybuilding. Collier Books (1985) ISBN 978-0-02-029520-4
