= EMLL 12th Anniversary Show =

Mexican Professional wrestling show

- Promotion: Empresa Mexicana de Lucha Libre
- Date: September 21, 1945
- City: Mexico City, Mexico
- Venue: Arena Modelo

EMLL Anniversary Show chronology
← Previous; 11th Anniversary	Next → 13th Anniversary

The EMLL 12th Anniversary Show (Spanish: 12. Aniversario de EMLL) was a professional wrestling major show event produced by Empresa Mexicana de Lucha Libre (EMLL) that took place on September 21, 1945, in Mexico City, Mexico, Mexico City, Mexico. The event commemorated the 12th anniversary of EMLL, which would become the oldest professional wrestling promotion in the world. The Anniversary show is EMLL's biggest show of the year, their Super Bowl event. The EMLL Anniversary Show series is the longest-running annual professional wrestling show, starting in 1934.

== Production ==
=== Background ===
The 1945 Anniversary show commemorated the 12th anniversary of the Mexican professional wrestling company Empresa Mexicana de Lucha Libre (Spanish for "Mexican Wrestling Promotion"; EMLL) holding their first show on September 22, 1933, by promoter and founder Salvador Lutteroth. EMLL was rebranded early in 1992 to become Consejo Mundial de Lucha Libre ("World Wrestling Council"; CMLL) signal their departure from the National Wrestling Alliance. With the sales of the Jim Crockett Promotions to Ted Turner in 1988 EMLL became the oldest, still-operating wrestling promotion in the world. Over the years EMLL/CMLL has on occasion held multiple shows to celebrate their anniversary but since 1977 the company has only held one annual show, which is considered the biggest show of the year, CMLL's equivalent of WWE's WrestleMania or their Super Bowl event. CMLL has held their Anniversary show at Arena México in Mexico City, Mexico since 1956, the year the building was completed, over time Arena México earned the nickname "The Cathedral of Lucha Libre" due to it hosting most of EMLL/CMLL's major events since the building was completed. EMLL held their first anniversary show at Arena Modelo in 1933 and returned to that building in 1937 through 1943. From 1934 through 1936 EMLL rented Arena Nacional for their shows, but in 1944 they began holding their anniversary shows at Arena Coliseo, an arena they owned. From 1944 through 1955 EMLL held all their anniversary shows at Arena Coliseo. Traditionally EMLL/CMLL holds their major events on Friday Nights, replacing their regularly scheduled Super Viernes show.

=== Storylines ===
The event featured an undetermined number of professional wrestling matches with different wrestlers involved in pre-existing scripted feuds, plots and storylines. Wrestlers were portrayed as either heels (referred to as rudos in Mexico, those that portray the "bad guys") or faces (técnicos in Mexico, the "good guy" characters) as they followed a series of tension-building events, which culminated in a wrestling match or series of matches. Due to the nature of keeping mainly paper records of wrestling at the time no documentation has been found for some of the matches of the show.

== Event ==
The only confirmed match of the 12th Anniversary Show had reigning champion Bobby Bonales defend the Mexican National Middleweight Championship against top contender Gory Guerrero in a two out of three falls match. Bonales had won the Championship from El Santo only months prior to the show. Bonales lost to Gory Guerrero, giving Guerrero one of the earliest title wins in his long and very successful career.

== Aftermath ==
Gory Guerrero held the National Middleweight Title until February 23, 1946, when he wins the higher ranked World Middleweight Championship from Tarzán López and gives up the Mexican National title.

=== Results ===
No.	Results	Stipulations
1	Gory Guerrero defeated Bobby Bonales (c)	Best two-out-of-three falls match for the Mexican National Middleweight Championship
(c) / – the champion(s) heading into the match
