= Devil Murasaki =

Japanese professional wrestler

Personal information
- Born: Akio Murasaki; April 30, 1942 Osaka, Japan
- Died: October 23, 2017 (aged 75)

Professional wrestling career
- Ring name(s): Devil Mursaki; Great Saki; Kosuke Murasaki; Onizo Murasaki; Onikichi Murasaki; Taro Murasaki
- Billed height: 1.78 m (5 ft 10 in)
- Billed weight: 100 kg (220 lb)
- Debut: 1967
- Retired: 1980

Akio Murasaki (安達勝治, Murasaki Akio) (April 30, 1942 – October 23, 2017), better known as Devil Murasaki, was a Japanese professional wrestler who competed in North American and Japanese regional promotions from the 1960s until the 1970s.

== Professional wrestling career ==
Murasaki began his professional wrestling career in 1967. In 1972, he made his debut in North America in Tennessee.

In the winter of 1974, he made his debut in Calgary's Stampede Wrestling as Great Saki teaming with Japanese wrestler Tokyo Joe (Joe Daigo).

On March 18, 1974, when he and Tokyo Joe were returning to Calgary after the matches in Lethbridge, Alberta. The car he was riding in with Tokyo Joe went off the road. A Canadian Press story detailed the rest: “A tow truck was called and as Sakeda helped attach the car to the truck, an oncoming vehicle spun out of control and hit him, severing Joe's right leg. The leg was amputated in Calgary hospital four inches above the knee.”

After Joe was amputated and forced to retire, Murasaki went to Mexico and later to Germany and Austria. He returned to Japan in 1977 and finished his wrestling career there.

== Championships and accomplishments ==
- Stampede Wrestling
  - Stampede International Tag Team Championship (1 time) with Tokyo Joe
