= Bobby Bonales =

Mexican wrestler (1916–1994)

Personal information
- Born: Roberto Aceves; September 25, 1916 Morelia, Michoacán, Mexico
- Died: June 26, 1994 (aged 77)
- Spouse: Alba Villagran
- Children: Daniel Aceves; Roberto Aceves; Cristina Aceves; Norma Aceves

Professional wrestling career
- Ring name: Bobby Bonales
- Billed from: Morelia, Michoacán, Mexico
- Trained by: Diablo Velasco
- Debut: 1934

Roberto Aceves (September 25, 1916 – June 26, 1994), better known under the ring name Bobby Bonales, was a Mexican professional wrestler, who was active during the early days of pro-wrestling in Mexico, making his debut in 1934. Aceves’ son Daniel Aceves is an Olympic medal winner in Greco-Roman wrestling. As Bonales, Aceves held several championships including the NWA World Welterweight Championship, the Mexican National Middleweight Championship and the Mexican National Lightweight Championship. In recent years Mexican wrestling promotion Consejo Mundial de Lucha Libre (CMLL) has honored Bonales on several occasions. Known as La Maravilla Moreliana ("The Marvel from Morelia"); Bonales innovated the Topé Suicida wrestling moves.

== Professional wrestling career ==
Roberto Aceves was born in Morelia, Michoacán, Mexico but at the age of 8 his family moved to Mexico City. By the age of 14 Aceves began training to become a professional wrestler and made his debut in 1934. Adopting the ring name Bobby Bonales he began working for promoter Salvador Lutteroth and his newly founded Empresa Mexicana de Lucha Libre (EMLL) during the early days of Mexican professional wrestling. On September 27, 1936, Bonales lost to Chong Yip on the undercard of the EMLL 3rd Anniversary Show. During the following years Bonales worked his way up the ranks and on May 5, 1940, he defeated Jack O'Brien to win the Mexican National Lightweight Championship. He later lost the championship to Dientes Hernandez. On April 6, 1941, Lobo Negro defeated Bonales in a match for the vacant Mexican National Welterweight Championship. Bonales became one of the first wrestlers to train under Diablo Velasco, during which time he developed a new move called a Topé Suicida, a move where he would dive through the ring ropes out of the ring, striking his opponent with a headbutt. The Topé Suicida became one of the signature moves of the Lucha Libre style, emphasizing the high flying style. Bonales wrestled on the first show of the newly built Arena Coliseo when it opened on April 2, 1943. Later that same year Bonales began a high-profile storyline feud with El Santo, who at the time was an emerging performer in Mexico. On June 11, 1943, Bobby Bonales defeated El Santo to win the Mexican National Middleweight Championship as part of that storyline. The two met in the main event of the EMLL 10th Anniversary Show where El Santo defeated Bonales in one of the earliest Luchas de Apuestas, or "bet match", after which he was shaved bald. Later on El Santo would regain the Middleweight championship, but Bonales became a two-time champion on June 1, 1945, when he defeated El Santo for the title once again. His second run with the Middleweight Championship ended at the EMLL 12th Anniversary Show when Gory Guerrero defeated Bonales Three years later Bonales and Guerrero fought each other at both of the EMLL 15th Anniversary Shows, splitting the matches between the two. The following year at the EMLL 16th Anniversary Show Bonales teamed up with Tarzán López to defeat El Santo and Gory Guerrero in the main event of the show. On July 11, 1952, defeated Gory Guerrero to win the NWA World Welterweight Championship only to lose it to El Santo two months later.

In 1962 Bonales made his debut in a Lucha film, playing himself in a movie called Santo vs. las Mujeres Vampiro ("Santo versus the Vampire Women") which was later dubbed into English under the title "Samson vs. the Vampire Women". Bonales retired from active, in-ring competition in the mid-1960s and focused on training instead. Early on he trained José de Jesús Díaz Mendoza, who later became known as Villano I as well as his brother José Alfredo Díaz Mendoza, also known as Villano II prior to the Mendoza brother's debut in 1969. Later on he would train his son Daniel Aceves in amateur wrestling, starting him off on a career that would see Daniel represent Mexico at the 1984 Summer Olympics in Los Angeles. Aceves won a silver medal in the Men's Greco-Roman 52 kg.

== Death and legacy ==
Aceves died from cancer on June 26, 1994, at the age of 77, survived by his son Daniel. In 2009 Consejo Mundial de Lucha Libre (CMLL), the renamed EMLL, honored Bobby Bonales by awarding a trophy, the Copa Bobby Bonales to the wrestler voted the "Best Technical wrestler" for that year. The first recipient was Blue Panther, followed by Negro Casas in 2010 and Atlantis in 2011. CMLL did not award the Copa Bobby Bonales from 2012 or 2013 but in 2014 they brought it back and awarded it to Último Guerrero. On March 2, 2012, CMLL honored Bonales as part of their 2012 Homenaje a Dos Leyendas ("Homage to two legends"), including an in-ring dedication to Bonales during the show and presenting his son Daniel with a commemorative plaque in Bonales' honor.

The Copa Bobby Bonales increasingly expanded its purview, was awarded to a larger field of people each year, and has essentially become a lifetime achievement award.

Copa Bobby Bonales winners

Year	Winner	Reference
2009	Blue Panther	
2010	Negro Casas	
2011	Atlantis	
2014	Último Guerrero	
2017	Volador Jr. Marcela	
2018	Máscara Año 2000; La Amapola; Tony Salazar	
2019	El Felino; La Comandante; Arturo Beristáin	
2021	El Terrible; Princesa Sugehit; Virus; KeMonito	
2022	Mistico; Dalys la Caribeña; Panterita del Ring; Ultimo Dragoncito	
2023	Mephisto; Titán; Lluvia; La Jarochita	
2024	Averno; Dark Silueta; El Satánico; Pierrothito; Salvador Lutteroth Lomelí	
2025	Halcón Ortíz; Atlantis Jr. Zeuxis; Pequeño Olímpico; Salvador Lutteroth Camou	
2026	Fray Tormenta; Rey Bucanero; India Sioux; Shockercito; KeMalito	

== Championships and accomplishments ==
- Empresa Mexicana de Lucha Libre
  - Mexican National Lightweight Championship (1 time)
  - Mexican National Middleweight Championship (2 times)
  - NWA World Welterweight Championship (1 time)
  - Homenaje a Dos Leyendas honoree (2012)

== Luchas de Apuestas record ==
Winner (wager)	Loser (wager)	Location	Event	Date	Notes
El Murciélago Enmascarado (mask)	Bobby Bonales (hair)	Mexico City	Live event	June 30, 1940	
El Santo (mask)	Bobby Bonales (hair)	Mexico City	EMLL 10th Anniversary Show	September 24, 1943	
El Santo (mask)	Bobby Bonales (hair)	N/A	Live event	February 9, 1944	
Cavernario Galindo (hair)	Bobby Bonales	Mexico City	Live event	1959	
Bobby Bonales (hair)	El Hindu (hair)	Mexico City	Live event	August 2, 1964	
