= Tokyo Joe (Joe Daigo) =

Japanese professional wrestler

Personal information
- Born: Yukihiro Sakeda; March 11, 1942 Sendai, Miyagi, Japan
- Died: November 4, 2017 (aged 75) Calgary, Alberta, Canada

Professional wrestling career
- Ring name(s): Tokyo Joe; Joe Daigo; Tetsunosuke Daigo; Tsuyoshi Sendai
- Billed height: 1.75 m (5 ft 9 in)
- Billed weight: 95 kg (209 lb)
- Debut: 1966
- Retired: March 18, 1974

Yukihiro Sakeda (安達勝治, Sakeda Yukihiro) (March 10, 1942 – November 4, 2017), better known as Tokyo Joe, was a Japanese professional wrestler who competed in North American and Japanese regional promotions from the 1960s until the early-1970s.

== Professional wrestling career ==
Tokyo Joe began his professional wrestling career in 1966 in Japan. Then in 1967, he made his debut in North America for Detroit's Big Time Wrestling (Detroit).

During most of his career, he worked for Japan's International Wrestling Enterprise. In 1972, he made his debut in Canada for Montreal's Grand Prix Wrestling.

In the winter of 1974, he made his debut in Calgary's Stampede Wrestling teaming with Japanese wrestler Great Saki.

== Retirement and death ==
At the age of 31, the life of Tokyo Joe took a drastic turn on March 18, 1974, when he was returning to Calgary after the matches in Lethbridge, Alberta. The car he was riding in with The Great Saki went off the road. A Canadian Press story detailed the rest: “A tow truck was called and as Sakeda helped attach the car to the truck, an oncoming vehicle spun out of control and hit him, severing his right leg. The leg was amputated in Calgary hospital four inches above the knee.”

Joe was confined to a wheelchair, and he trained Bret Hart, Natalya Neidhart, Davey Boy Smith Jr., Tyson Kidd, and Viktor.

Joe passed away at 75 on November 4, 2017 in Calgary.

Natalya Neidhart said that Joe was an inspiration to her, Tyson Kidd, and Davey Boy Smith Jr.

== Championships and accomplishments ==
- Stampede Wrestling
  - Stampede International Tag Team Championship (1 time) with Great Saki
