= Mexican National Light Heavyweight Championship =

Wrestling match

- The championship belt

Details
- Promotion: Comisión de Box y Lucha Libre Mexico D.F. (Sanctioning body); Empresa Mexicana de Lucha Libre (1942–1992); Asistencia Asesoría y Administración (1992–2004); ENSEMA (2004–2007); Consejo Mundial de Lucha Libre (2007–current)
- Date established: September 25, 1942
- Current champion: Vegas Depredador
- Date won: September 25, 2026
Statistics
- First champion: Jesus Anaya
- Most reigns: La Parka/L.A. Park and Pierroth Jr. (4 reigns)

The Mexican National Light Heavyweight Championship (Campeonato Nacional Semicompleto in Spanish) is a national Mexican singles professional wrestling championship sanctioned by the Comisión de Box y Lucha Libre Mexico D.F. (Mexico City Boxing and Wrestling Commission). Since its creation in 1942, the championship has not been promoted by one specific promotion throughout its existence, but shared between many Mexican promotions. Among others, Empresa Mexicana de Lucha Libre (EMLL), Asistencia Asesoría y Administración (AAA), the ENSEMA promotion and the Independent circuit but since December 2007 Consejo Mundial de Lucha Libre (CMLL) has had the exclusive rights to the championship. (Note: In this statement, the rights refers to the every day use of the championship, determining which storylines the championship is being used in, who gets to challenge for it and how to use it in a public relations sense.) As it is a professional wrestling championship, it is not won legitimately: it is instead won via a scripted ending to a match or awarded to a wrestler because of a storyline The official definition of the Light Heavyweight weight class in Mexico is between 92 kg (203 lb) and 97 kg (214 lb), but the weight limits for the different classes are not always strictly enforced. (Note: One example of this is Mephisto's holding the NWA World Welterweight Championship, a belt with a 78 kg (172 lb) upper limit despite weighing 90 kg (200 lb).) Jesus Anaya became the first National Light Heavyweight Champion when he won the inaugural tournament that concluded on the EMLL 9th Anniversary Show, defeating Black Guzmán. Empresa Mexicana de Luch Libre was the primary promotion to use the championship in subsequent years, although did not have exclusive control of the championship.^{[G1]}

In 1992 then-CMLL booker Antonio Peña left the company to create AAA and brought a number of CMLL wrestlers with him, including among others the then-reigning Mexican National Light Heavyweight Champion Máscara Sagrada. The commission allowed Máscara Sagrada to take the championship with him to AAA.^{[G1]} From AAA's creation in 1992 until 2002 they had exclusive control of the championship, In 2002 El Dandy won the title, transitioning the championship to the ENSEMA promotion. In December 2007 Místico won the title from Vangelis, making it an official CMLL recognized championship from that point forward.

The current champion is Vegas Depredador, who is in his first reign. He won the title by defeating Esfinge at Noche de Campeones on September 25, 2026; he is the 74th overall champion. La Parka / L.A. Park and Pierroth Jr. are tied for most title reigns, with four reigns; Pierroth Jr. has the shortest reign at no more than 11 days. (Note: Two individuals have potentially shorter reigns as both Enrique Llanes and Máscara Sagrada II have a minimum length of 1 day but Pierroth Jr.'s reign is the shortest documented reign.) El Dandy's two reigns combine to 1,526 days, the most days for any champion, while the longest continuous reign belongs to Cavernario Galindo, with 1,249 days.

== Title history ==
Key
| No. | Overall reign number |
| Reign | Reign number for the specific champion |
| Days | Number of days held |
| N/A | Unknown information |
| + | Current reign is changing daily |

| No. | Champion | Championship change | | | Reign statistics | | Notes | Ref. |
| No. | Champion | Date | Event | Location | Reign | Days | Notes | Ref. |
|---|---|---|---|---|---|---|---|---|
Empresa Mexicana de Lucha Libre (EMLL)
| 1 | Jesús Anaya | September 25, 1942 | Mexico | EMLL 9th Anniversary Show | 1 | (Note: The exact date on which the championship was lost is not known, which means the championship reign lasted between 157 and 187 days) | Defeated Black Guzmán in the finals of a tournament | ^{[G1]} |
| 2 | Black Guzmán | March 1943 | Live event | Mexico | 1 | (Note: The exact date Black Guzmán won the championship has not been found, which means the championship reign lasted between 567 and 597 days) | | ^{[G1]} |
| 3 | Gorila Ramos | September 20, 1944 | EMLL 11th Anniversary Show | Mexico | 1 | 28 | | ^{[G1]} |
| 4 | Tarzán López | October 18, 1944 | Live event | Mexico | 1 | (Note: The exact date on which Tarzán López lost the championship is not known, which means the championship reign lasted between 75 and 105 days) | | ^{[G1]} |
| 5 | Black Guzmán | January 1945 | Live event | Mexico | 2 | (Note: The exact date on which Black Guzmán won the championship is not known, which means the championship reign lasted between 801 and 831 days) | | ^{[G1]} |
| 6 | Tarzán López | April 12, 1947 | Live event | Mexico | 2 | 811 | | ^{[G1]} |
| 7 | Cavernario Galindo | July 1, 1949 | Live event | Mexico City | 1 | (Note: The exact date on which Cavernario Galindo lost the championship is not known, which means the championship reign lasted between 1,249 and 1,279 days) | | ^{[G1]} |
| 8 | Enrique Llanes | December 1950 | Live event | Mexico | 1 | (Note: The exact date on which Enrique Llanes won the championship is not known, which means the championship reign lasted between 1 and 365 days) | | ^{[G1]} |
| — | Vacated | 1951 | — | — | — | — | Championship vacated for unverified reasons | ^{[G1]} |
| 9 | Tarzán López | September 7, 1956 | Live event | Mexico | 3 | (Note: The exact date on which the championship was vacated is not known, which means the championship reign lasted between 116 and 146 days) | Defeated Joe Grant in the finals of a tournament | ^{[G1]} |
| — | Vacated | January 1957 | — | — | — | — | Championship vacated for unverified reasons | |
| 10 | Espectro I | April 21, 1957 | Live event | Mexico | 1 | (Note: The exact date on which the championship was vacated is not known, which means the championship reign lasted between 1,229 and 1,251 days) | Defeated Bobby Bonales | ^{[G1]} |
| — | Vacated | September 1960 (nlt) | — | — | — | — | Championship vacated for unverified reasons | ^{[G1]} |
| 11 | Rubén Juárez | May 29, 1960 | Live event | Guadalajara, Jalisco | 1 | 1,203 | Defeated El Enfermero to win the championship | ^{[G1]} |
| 12 | Espanto I | September 14, 1963 | Live event | Monterrey, Nuevo León | 1 | 77 | | ^{[G1]} |
| 13 | Ray Mendoza | November 30, 1963 | Live event | Mexico City | 1 | 410 | | ^{[G1]} |
| 14 | Raúl Reyes | January 13, 1965 | EMLL Carnaval de Campeones | Mexico City | 1 | 112 | | ^{[G1]} |
| 15 | Alfonso Dantés | May 5, 1965 | Live event | Mexico | 1 | 286 | | ^{[G1]} |
| 16 | Espanto I | February 15, 1966 | Live event | Monterrey, Nuevo León | 2 | 241 | | ^{[G1]} |
| 17 | El Santo | October 14, 1966 | Live event | Mexicali, Baja California | 1 | (Note: The exact date on which El Santo lost the championship is not known, which means the championship reign lasted between 138 and 168 days) | | ^{[G1]} |
| 18 | Espanto I | March 1967 | Live event | Mexico | 3 | (Note: The exact date on which Espanto I won the championship is not known, which means the championship reign lasted between 73 and 103 days) | | ^{[G1]} |
| 19 | Mil Máscaras | June 12, 1967 | Live event | Mexico City | 1 | 125 | | ^{[G1]} |
| 20 | El Nazi | October 15, 1967 | Live event | Mexico City | 1 | 159 | | ^{[G1]} |
| 21 | Mil Máscaras | March 22, 1968 | Live event | Mexico | 2 | 19 | | ^{[G1]} |
| — | Vacated | April 10, 1968 | — | — | — | — | Championship vacated for unverified reasons | ^{[G1]} |
| 22 | Raul Mata | April 11, 1969 | Live event | Mexico | 1 | 1,164 | Defeated Dr. Wagner to win the championship. | ^{[G1]} |
| 23 | Enrique Vera | June 18, 1972 | Live event | Mexico | 1 | 271 | | ^{[G1]} |
| 24 | Dr. Wagner | March 16, 1973 | Live event | Mexico City | 1 | 555 | | ^{[G1]} |
| — | Vacated | September 22, 1974 | — | — | — | — | Championship vacated when Wagner won the NWA World Light Heavyweight Championship | ^{[G1]} |
| 25 | Alfonso Dantés | November 15, 1974 | Live event | Mexico City | 2 | 513 | Defeated El Halcón to win the championship. | ^{[G1]} |
| 26 | Dr. Wagner | April 11, 1976 | Live event | Guadalajara, Jalisco | 2 | 644 | | ^{[G1]} |
| 27 | El Canek | January 15, 1978 | Live event | Mexico City | 1 | 156 | | ^{[G1]} |
| 28 | Dos Caras | June 20, 1978 | Live event | Pachuca, Hidalgo | 1 | 292 | | ^{[G1]} |
| 29 | Astro Rey | April 8, 1979 | Live event | Mexico City | 1 | 217 | | ^{[G1]} |
| 30 | Dr. Wagner | November 11, 1979 | Live event | Mexico | 3 | 19 | | ^{[G1]} |
| 31 | Enrique Vera | November 30, 1979 | Live event | Mexico City | 2 | 658 | | ^{[G1]} |
| 32 | Alfonso Dantés | September 18, 1981 | Live event | Mexico City | 3 | 100 | | ^{[G1]} |
| 33 | Babe Face | December 27, 1981 | Live event | Mexico City | 1 | 570 | | ^{[G1]} |
| 34 | Mano Negra | July 20, 1983 | Live event | Cuernavaca, Morelos | 1 | 410 | | ^{[G1]} |
| 35 | Valente Fernández | September 2, 1984 | Live event | Monterrey, Nuevo León | 1 | 581 | | ^{[G1]} |
| 36 | Luis Mariscal | April 6, 1986 | Live event | Mexico | 1 | 193 | | ^{[G1]} |
| 37 | El Halcón '78 | October 16, 1986 | Live event | Mexico City | 1 | 536 | | ^{[G1]} |
| 38 | Pierroth Jr. | April 4, 1988 | Live event | San Lorenzo, Oaxaca | 1 | 156 | | ^{[G1]} |
| 39 | Mogur | September 7, 1988 | Live event | Nezahualcóyotl, Mexico State | 1 | 492 | | ^{[G1]} |
| 40 | Pierroth Jr. | January 12, 1990 | Live event | Mexico City | 2 | 433 | | ^{[G1]} |
| 41 | Máscara Sagrada | March 21, 1991 | Live event | Cuernavaca, Morelos | 1 | 435 | | ^{[G1]} |
Asistencia Asesoría y Administración (AAA)
| 42 | Universo 2000 | May 29, 1992 | Live event | Veracruz, Veracruz | 1 | 112 | Sometime during year 1992 the belt changed to promotion Asistencia Asesoría y Administración. | ^{[G1]} |
| 43 | Lizmark | September 18, 1992 | Live event | Acapulco, Guerrero | 1 | 721 | | ^{[G1]} |
| 44 | La Parka | September 9, 1994 | Live event | Río Bravo, Tamaulipas | 1 | 200 | | ^{[G1]} |
| 45 | Jerry Estrada | March 28, 1995 | Live event | Matamoros, Tamaulipas | 1 | 131 | | ^{[G1]} |
| 46 | La Parka | August 6, 1995 | Live event | Monterrey, Nuevo León | 2 | 167 | | ^{[G1]} |
| 47 | Pierroth Jr. | January 20, 1996 | Live event | Mexicali, Baja California | 3 | (Note: The exact date on which Pierroth Jr. lost the championship is not known, which means the championship reign lasted between 1 and 11 days) | | ^{[G1]} |
| 48 | La Parka | January 1996 | Live event | Mexico | 3 | (Note: The exact date on which La Parka won the championship not known, which means the championship reign lasted between 110 and 120 days) | | ^{[G1]} |
| 49 | Pimpinela Escarlata | May 20, 1996 | Live event | Nuevo Laredo, Tamaulipas | 1 | 112 | | ^{[G1]} |
| 50 | Latin Lover | September 9, 1996 | Live event | Nuevo Laredo, Tamaulipas | 1 | 252 | | ^{[G1]} |
| 51 | Pierroth Jr. | May 19, 1997 | Live event | Nuevo Laredo, Tamaulipas | 4 | (Note: The exact date on which Pierroth Jr. lost the championship is not known, which means the championship reign lasted between 227 and 362 days) | | ^{[G1]} |
| 52 | Máscara Sagrada | 1998 | Live event | Mexico | 1 | (Note: The exact date on which Máscara Sagrada won the championship is not known, which means the championship reign lasted between 1 and 135 days) | | ^{[G1]} |
| 53 | Sangre Chicana | May 16, 1998 | Live event | Torreón, Coahuila | 1 | 1,080 | | ^{[G1]} |
| 54 | Héctor Garza | April 30, 2000 | Live event | Monterrey, Nuevo León | 1 | 776 | | |
| 55 | Electroshock | June 15, 2001 | Live event | Tijuana, Baja California | 1 | 310 | | |
| 56 | Perro Aguayo Jr. | April 21, 2002 | Live event | Chihuahua, Chihuahua | 1 | 132 | | |
| 57 | El Dandy | August 31, 2002 | Live event | Reynosa, Tamaulipas | 1 | 776 | | |
ENSEMA
| 58 | L.A. Park | October 15, 2004 | Live event | Mexico City | 4 | 162 | Sometime during year 2004 the belt changed to promotion ENSEMA. | |
| 59 | El Dandy | March 26, 2005 | Live event | Acapulco, Guerrero | 2 | 750 | | |
Consejo Mundial de Lucha Libre (CMLL)
| 60 | Vangelis | April 15, 2007 | Live event | Mexico City | 1 | 233 | This match was possibly fictitious. (Note: From time to time promotions will award a championship to a wrestler and then publicize results of a match that did not actually take place.) Sometime during year 2007 the belt changed to promotion Consejo Mundial de Lucha Libre (CMLL). | |
| 61 | Místico | December 4, 2007 | Live event | Santiago de Querétaro, Querétaro | 1 | 801 | This was a double title match with Místico's CMLL World Welterweight Championship also at stake. | |
| 62 | Volador Jr. | February 12, 2010 | CMLL Super Viernes | Mexico City | 1 | 235 | | |
| 63 | La Máscara | October 5, 2010 | Live event | Mexico City | 1 | 1,043 | | |
| 64 | Mephisto | August 13, 2013 | Live event | Guadalajara, Jalisco | 1 | 741 | | |
| 65 | Atlantis | August 24, 2015 | Live event | Puebla, Puebla | 1 | 1,170 | | |
| 66 | Bárbaro Cavernario | November 6, 2018 | Live event | Mexico City | 1 | 966 | | |
| 67 | Felino | June 29, 2021 | Live event | Mexico City | 1 | 105 | | |
| 68 | Ángel de Oro | October 12, 2021 | Live event | Mexico City | 1 | 590 | | |
| 69 | Esfinge | May 25, 2023 | Martes Populares | Mexico City | 1 | 1,219 | | |
| 70 | Vegas Depredador | September 25, 2026 | Noche de Campeones | Mexico City | 1 | 1+ | | |

== Combined reigns ==
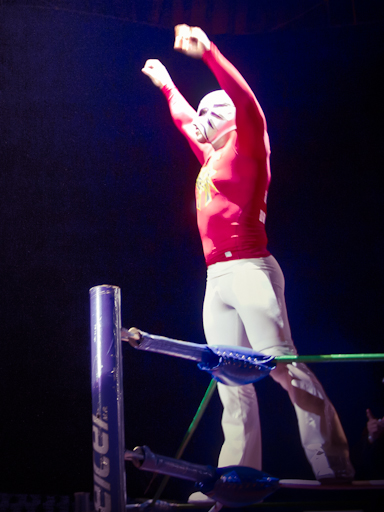
La Máscara, who held the championship for 1,043 days.

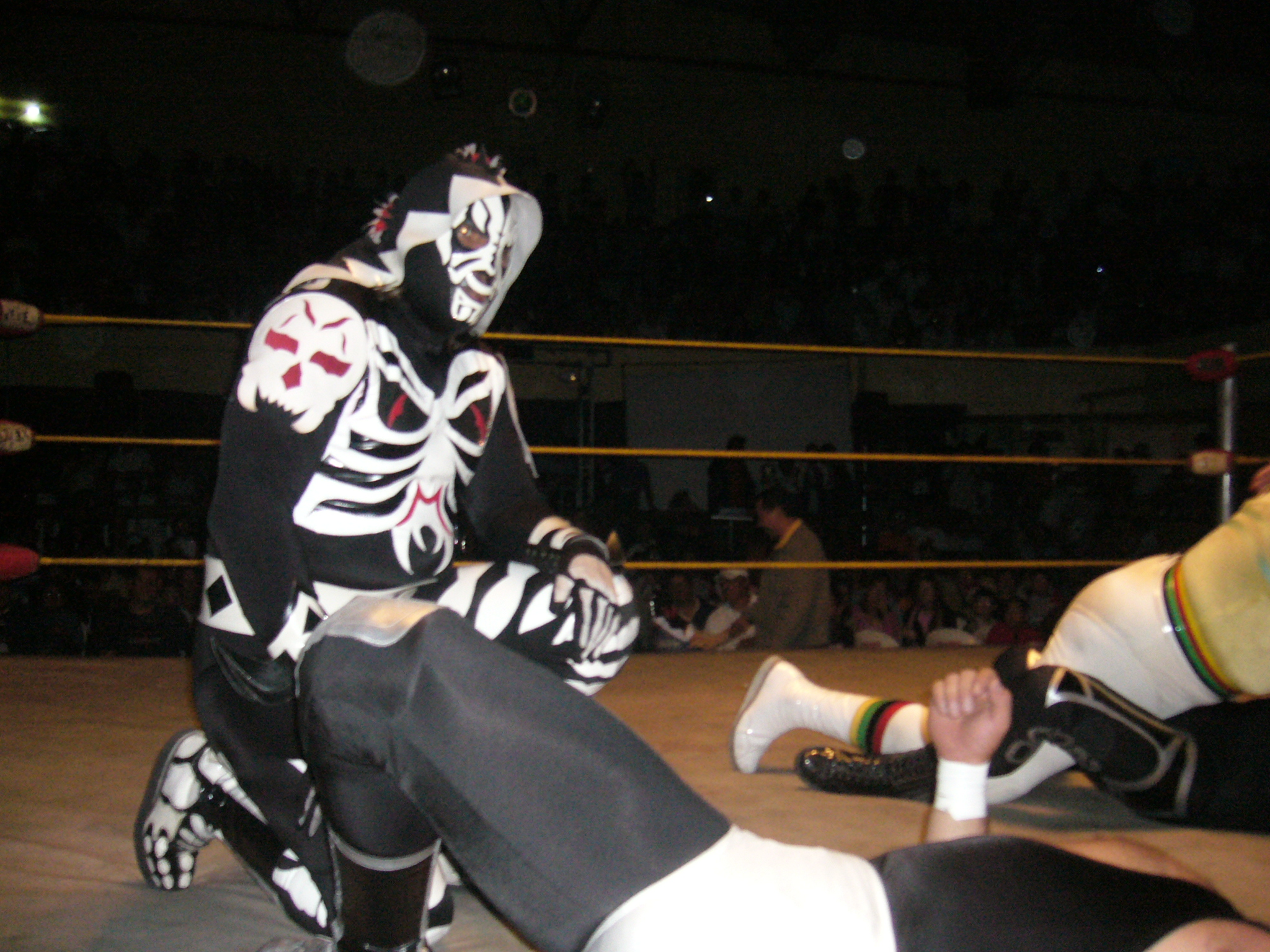
La Parka, who won the championship on four occasions, three times in AAA and once in ENSEMA.

Key

| † | Indicates the current champion |
| ¤ | The exact length of at least one championship reign is uncertain, so the shortest possible length is used. |
| + | Indicates that the date changes daily for the current champion. |

| Rank | Wrestler | # of reigns | Combined days | Ref(s). |
|---|---|---|---|---|
| 1 | El Dandy | 2 | 1,526 | |
| 2 | Black Guzmán | 2 | 1,368¤ (Note: Black Guzmán's first reign lasted at least 567 days while his second reign lasted at least 801 days.) | ^{[G1]} |
| 3 | Cavernario Galindo | 1 | 1,249¤ (Note: Cavernario Galindo's only reign lasted at least 1,249 days) | ^{[G1]} |
| 4 | Espectro I | 1 | 1,229¤ (Note: Espanto I's only reign lasted at least 1,229 days.) | ^{[G1]} |
| 5 | Esfinge | 1 | 1,219 | |
| 6 | Dr. Wagner | 3 | 1,218 | ^{[G1]} |
| 7 | Rubén Juárez | 1 | 1,203 | ^{[G1]} |
| 8 | Atlantis | 1 | 1,170 | |
| 9 | Raul Mata | 1 | 1,164 | ^{[G1]} |
| 10 | Sangre Chicana | 1 | 1,080 | ^{[G1]} |
| 11 | La Máscara | 1 | 1,043 | |
| 12 | Tarzán López | 3 | 1,019¤ (Note: Tarzán López' first reign lasted at least 75 days, his second reign lasted 811 days and his third reign lasted at least 114 days.) | ^{[G1]} |
| 13 | Bárbaro Cavernario | 1 | 966 | |
| 14 | Enrique Vera | 2 | 929 | ^{[G1]} |
| 15 | Alfonso Dantés | 3 | 899 | ^{[G1]} |
| 16 | Pierroth Jr. | 4 | 826¤ (Note: Pierroth Jr.'s first reign lasted 156 days, his second reign lasted 433 days. His third reign lasted at least 1 day and his fourth reign lasted at least 227 days.) | ^{[G1]} |
| 17 | Místico | 1 | 802 | |
| 18 | Héctor Garza | 1 | 776 | |
| 19 | Mephisto | 1 | 742 | |
| 20 | Lizmark | 2 | 721 | ^{[G1]} |
| 21 | La Parka / L.A. Park | 4 | 639¤ (Note: La Parka's first reign lasted 200 days, the second reign lasted 167 days, the third reign lasted at least 110 days and the four reign lasted 162 days.) | ^{[G1]} |
| 22 | Valente Fernández | 1 | 581 | ^{[G1]} |
| 23 | Babe Face | 1 | 570 | ^{[G1]} |
| 24 | El Halcón '78 | 1 | 536 | ^{[G1]} |
| 25 | Mogur | 1 | 492 | ^{[G1]} |
| 26 | Máscara Sagrada | 1 | 435 | ^{[G1]} |
| 27 | Mano Negra | 1 | 410 | ^{[G1]} |
| 27 | Ray Mendoza | 1 | 410 | ^{[G1]} |
| 29 | Ángel de Oro | 1 | 590 | |
| 30 | Espanto I | 3 | 335¤ (Note: Espanto I's first reign lasted 241 days, his second reign lasted at least 73 days.) | ^{[G1]} |
| 31 | Electroshock | 1 | 310 | |
| 32 | Dos Caras | 1 | 292 | ^{[G1]} |
| 33 | Latin Lover | 1 | 252 | ^{[G1]} |
| 34 | Volador Jr. | 1 | 236 | |
| 35 | Vangelis | 1 | 233 | |
| 36 | Astro Rey | 1 | 217 | ^{[G1]} |
| 37 | Luis Mariscal | 1 | 193 | ^{[G1]} |
| 38 | El Nazi | 1 | 159 | ^{[G1]} |
| 39 | Jesus Anaya | 1 | 157¤ (Note: Jesus Anaya's reign lasted at least 157 days.) | ^{[G1]} |
| 40 | El Canek | 1 | 156 | ^{[G1]} |
| 41 | Mil Máscaras | 2 | 144 | ^{[G1]} |
| 42 | El Santo | 1 | 138¤ (Note: El Santo's reign lasted at least 138 days.) | ^{[G1]} |
| 43 | Perro Aguayo Jr. | 1 | 132 | |
| 44 | Jerry Estrada | 1 | 131 | ^{[G1]} |
| 45 | Raúl Reyes | 1 | 122 | ^{[G1]} |
| 44 | Pimpinela Escarlata | 1 | 112 | ^{[G1]} |
| 44 | Universo 2000 | 1 | 112 | ^{[G1]} |
| 46 | Felino | 1 | 105 | |
| 47 | Gorila Ramos | 1 | 28 | ^{[G1]} |
| 48 | Vegas Depredador † | 1 | 1+ | |
| 49 | Enrique Llanes | 1 | 1¤ (Note: Enrique Llanes' title reign lasted at least 1 day.) | ^{[G1]} |
| 50 | Máscara Sagrada II | 1 | 1¤ (Note: Máscara Sagrada's only title reign lasted at least 1 day.) | ^{[G1]} |
