= Firpo Segura =

Mexican boxer

- A publicity picture of Segura in his prime.

Personal information
- Born: Francisco Segura García; November 10, 1907 Mexico City, Mexico
- Died: January 15, 1968 (aged 60) Mexico City, Mexico
- Children: Carlos Segura
- Family: Bobby Segura (brother); Canelo Segura (nephew)

Professional wrestling career
- Ring name(s): Firpo Mexicano; Francisco Segura; Firpo Segura
- Billed height: 169 cm (5 ft 7 in)
- Billed weight: 89 kg (196 lb)
- Trained by: Jimmy Dundee (boxing); Charro Aguayo (wrestling)
- Debut: January 18, 1934 (pro wrestling)
- Retired: 1955

Francisco Segura García (November 10, 1907 – January 15, 1968) was a Mexican actor, boxer, professional wrestler best known under the ring name Firpo Segura, given the name after the Argentine boxer Luis Ángel Firpo. As a boxer he held both the Mexican Light Heavyweight and Heavyweight Championship and as a professional wrestler he won the Mexican National Heavyweight Championship on four occasions and the Mexican National Middleweight Championship once. Segura became one of the first Mexican born stars of professional wrestling history and is at times referred to as the "First Idol of Mexican Professional Wrestling" being one of the first Mexican born wrestlers to receive top billing in events.

== Personal life ==
Francisco Segura was born on November 10, 1907, in Barrio de Soto in Colonia Guerrero, Mexico City where he grew with his brother Roberto "Bobby" Segura. (Note: Records are not clear if Francisco Segura was older or younger than Roberto Segura.) Segura started his boxing training at a relatively early age as well as amateur wrestling. Segura's son would later become a luchador (professional wrestler), billed as Carlos Segura. Francisco Segura García died on January 15, 1968, due to a heart attack.

== Boxing career (1926–1935) ==
Segura made his boxing debut on September 25, 1926, at the age of 18, boxing to a draw against Jose Verduzco in an eight-round bout. He soon earned the nickname "Firpo" due to his boxing style resembling that of Argentine boxer Luis Ángel Firpo, leading him to being billed as "Firpo Mexicano" for some of his fights. To supplement his income from boxing Segura worked as a shoemaker and later on as a baker's assistant as well. Amassing a record of 10 victories, 4 losses and a draw Segura won both the Mexican Lightweight Boxing championship and the Mexican Heavyweight boxing championship during his career. In 1935 he boxed his last match, fighting his Lucha libre rival Gorila Macías in a match that ended in a "no contest" as the two began to wrestle instead, as a way to draw further attention to Segura's wrestling career.

== Professional wrestling career (1934–1955) ==
Segura trained with Charro Aguayo for his professional wrestling debut, incorporating his boxing background with the lucha libre style of wrestling. He made his debut on January 28, 1934, in a match against Tony Canales, but sources differ on the outcome of the match. One source states that Segura won the match, while other state that the match went to a draw at first but Segura got so frustrated with Canales' cheating that he punched him out and was disqualified as a result. In the early days of Salvador Lutteroth's Empresa Mexicana de Lucha Libre (EMLL) the shows usually featured Americans in the main events with most of the Mexican wrestlers working lower on the cards. With Firpo Segura's boxing background and in-ring skills he became one of the first Mexicans to rise up the ranks of EMLL. often wrestling against various "Foreign menaces" that Lutteroth brought to Mexico. At the EMLL 2nd Anniversary Show Segura lost to American Jack Howland in the semi-main event of the show. Segura's popularity kept growing, making him one of the first Mexican established Main Events, getting top billing all over Mexico. With time Segura was established as the "First Idol of Lucha Libre". Early in his lucha libre career Segura began a long running rivalry with Gorila Macías, that led them to face off all over Mexico, including what was supposed to be a boxing match but ended in a wrestling match instead.

In 1937 he competed in a tournament to determine the next holder of the Mexican National Middleweight Championship, a tournament that also included his brother Bobby, Black Guzmán, and eventual tournament winner Octavio Gaona among others. ON September 2, 1938, Segura defeated Gaona to win his first wrestling championship, the Middleweight Championship. Due to incomplete records of results for that time period it is not clear exactly when Octavio Gaona regained the championship. For the EMLL 7th Anniversary Show, held on September 12, 1940, Segura teamed up with his longtime rival Macías to defeat the team of Tony Fellitto and "Tigre" Ray Ryan, this match was one of the earliest examples of a Parejas Increibles ("Incredible Pairs") match where two rivals were forced to team up for a tag team match. In 1940 Segura defeated Doc Macías, brother of Gorila Macías, in a tournament final to win the Mexican National Heavyweight Championship, underscoring his position as one of the top names of the early days of Lucha Libre. Records are not clear on how many, if any successful title defenses Segura had between 1940 and 1942 when he lost the championship to Ray Duran. Segura regained the championship from Duran in 1943, again with records being unclear on the actual date. By 1943 Segura had become involved in another long running, very intense rivalry, this time with Enmascarado Rojo ("The Red Masked Man"). The storyline started with Enmascarado Rojo and Segura's brother Bobby Segura feuding, including one of the earlies Lucha de Apuestas, or bet matches, in Mexican history. In what was described as the second ever "mask vs. hair" match in Mexico Enmascarado Rojo pinned Bobby Segura, but afterwards the crowd begged for mercy on Bobby Segura's behalf and thus he was allowed to keep his hair, but a second Lucha de Apuestas ended with another victory for Enmascarado Rojo and this time Bobby Segura had all his hair shaved off. Following his brother's hair loss Firpo Segura took up the fight for the "family pride" and began targeting Enmascarado Rojo, facing him in various tag team matches around Mexico as they built the storyline to their own Lucha de Apuesta match. On January 18, 1943, Segura defeated Enmascarado Rojo, which forced Rojo to unmask and reveal his real name, Miguel King, as per lucha libre traditions. In 1943 the construction for Arena Coliseo in Mexico City was completed and the arena became EMLL's new main venue. On the first show in the new building Firpo Segura took on his rival Gorila Macías in the semi-main event, no results document the actual outcome of the match. At some point in 1943 Segura became a two-time Mexican National Heavyweight Champion as he defeated Rey Duran to regain the championship. On March 28, 1944, Firpo Segura won yet another mask as he defeated El Chimpancé in a Lucha de Apuestas match in Guadalajara, Jalisco, forcing his opponent to unmask. In later 1945 he became involved in a feud with the masked "Grey Shadow" who wanted a match for the Mexican National Heavyweight Championship. The feud between the two led to a Lucha de Apuestas match on March 22, 19 where Segura defeated his opponent, forcing Grey Shadow to unmask and reveal that his name was Daniel Aldana. Segura put his heavyweight championship on the line in one of the featured matches for the EMLL 13th Anniversary Show, losing the championship to the American Steve Morgan. Segura regained the championship in March, 1947 to become a three time champion. The following year longtime rival Daniel Aldana, now using his own name after unmasking, gained a measure of revenge on Segura as he won the Mexican National Heavyweight Championship from him. Segure did not regain the championship until 1952 when he defeated Aldana to win the title for the fourth time. On AUgust 12, 1954 Segura's fourth and final title reign ended as he lost to Joaquin Murreta. Segura retired from wrestling a few months later, early in 1955.

== Movie career ==
Segura appeared in a number of Mexican films over the years, including a number of Luchador films. His first film role, that of a wrestler, was in the 1938 movie Padre de más de cuatro (Father of More Than Four), which actually pre-dated the peak of the Luchador films Near the end of his in-ring career Segura was one of several wrestlers who appeared in the 1952 movie *El Luchador Fenómeno (The Wrestling Phenomenon) where he was one of the wrestlers involved in the movie's wrestling sequences. He would later play the role of an Esbirro del Murciélago ("Henchman of the Bat") in the 1957 movie La Momia Azteca (The Aztec Mummy), La Maldición de la Momia Azteca (The Curse of the Aztec Mummy) and La Momia Azteca contra el Robot Humano (The Robot vs. The Aztec Mummy) In 1961 he took part in a non-luchador movie called Guantes de oro (Golden Gloves) a boxing movie where he played a boxing veteran. His last movie role was in the 1962 Santo movie Santo Contra los Zombis (Santo versus the Zombies)

== Championships and accomplishments ==
- Boxing

- Mexican Light Heavyweight Championship (1 time)
- Mexican Heavyweight Championship (1 time)

- Lucha Libre

- Empresa Mexicana de Lucha Libre

- Mexican National Heavyweight Championship (4 times)
- Mexican National Middleweight Championship (1 time)

== Boxing record ==
Boxing record
10 Wins (7 T (KO)'s, 3 decisions), 4 Losses (3 decisions, 1 disqualification), 2 Draw (1 draw, 1 no contest)
Date	Result	Opponent	Location	Method	Round	Time	Record
1935-07-23	No Contest	(Mexico) Gorila Macías	Arena Model, Mexico City, Distrito Federal, Mexico	No Contest	? (6)	Unknown	10-4-2
The fight ended when the two started to wrestle each other instead.
1935-06-21	Win	(United States) Joe Deleruyelle	Arena Tex Rickard, Nuevo Laredo, Tamaulipas, Mexico	KO	9 (10)	Unknown	10-4-1
Segura's was scheduled to fight Manuel Zermeno in a 10-round match in Arena Tex Rickard on November 7, 1934.
1934-11-05	Win	(United States) Buck Easterling	Walkathon Arena, San Antonio, Texas, USA	Decision	8 (8	Unknown	9-4-1
Segura's debut in the United States and only match in the US.
1934-09-26	Win	(United States) Buddy Beck	Arena Tex Rickard, Nuevo Laredo, Tamaulipas, Mexico	KO	9 (10)	Unknown	8-4-1
1934-08-29	Win	(Mexico) Kid Corral	Arena Tex Rickard, Nuevo Laredo, Tamaulipas, Mexico	KO	1 (10)	Unknown	7-4-1
1932-06-04	Loss	(Mexico) Pepe Gonzales	El Toreo, Mexico City, Distrito Federal, Mexico	Decision	10 (10)	Unknown	6-4-1
1934-04-09	Win	(United States) Bert Colima	Arena Nacional, Mexico City, Distrito Federal, Mexico	Decision	12 (12)	Unknown	6-3-1
For the Mexican Heavyweight Championship, Segura retains.
1931-10-10	Win	(Mexico) Amador Carballido	Mexico City, Distrito Federal, Mexico	TKO	8 (10)	Unknown	5-3-1
1931-08-15	Loss	(Mexico) Battling Chico	Chihuahua, Chihuahua, Mexico	Decision	10 (10)	Unknown	4-3-1
1931-04-18	Loss	(Mexico) Angel "Kid" Sanchez	Arena Nacional, Mexico City, Distrito Federal, Mexico	Decision	10 (10)	Unknown	4-2-1
1930-11-22	Win	(Mexico) Babe Hummel	Arena Nacional, Mexico City, Distrito Federal, Mexico	KO	3 (10)	Unknown	4-1-1
For the Mexican Light Heavyweight Championship.
1930-10-25	Win	(Mexico) Eduardo Huaracha	Arena Nacional, Mexico City, Distrito Federal, Mexico	TKO	6 (10)	Unknown	3-1-1
For the Mexican Light Heavyweight Championship.
1930-01-04	Loss	(Mexico) Kid Triana	Durango, Durango, Mexico	DQ	10 (10)	Unknown	2-1-1
1929-09-11	Win	(Mexico) Dan Navarro	Mexico City, Distrito Federal, Mexico	Decision	12 (12)	Unknown	2-0-1
For the Mexican Light Heavyweight Championship.
1927-04-10	Win	(Mexico) Carlos Del Castillo	Mexico City, Distrito Federal, Mexico	TKO	3 (8)	Unknown	1-0-1
1926-09-25	Draw	(Mexico) Jose Verduzco	Arena Nacional, Mexico City, Distrito Federal, Mexico	Decision	8 (8)	Unknown	0-0-1
Legend: Win Loss Draw/No contest Notes

== Luchas de Apuestas record ==
Winner (wager)	Loser (wager)	Location	Event	Date	Notes
Firpo Segura (hair)	Enmascarado Rojo (mask)	Mexico City	EMLL Live event	January 18, 1943	
Firpo Segura (hair)	El Chimpancé (mask)	Guadalajara, Jalisco	EMLL Live event	March 28, 1944	
Firpo Segura (hair)	The Grey Shadow (mask)	Mexico City	EMLL Live event	March 22, 1946	

== Filmography ==
- Padre de más de cuatro (Father of More Than Four, 1938, Luchador/Wrestler)
- El Luchador Fenómeno (The Wrestling Phenomenon, 1952, Luchador/Wrestler)
- La Momia Azteca (The Aztec Mummy, 1957, Esbirro del Murciélago / "Henchman of the Bat")
- La Maldición de la Momia Azteca (The Curse of the Aztec Mummy, 1957, Esbirro del Murciélago / "Henchman of the Bat")
- La Momia Azteca contra el Robot Humano (The Robot vs. The Aztec Mummy, 1958, Esbirro del Murciélago / "Henchman of the Bat")
- Guantes de oro (Golden Gloves, 1961)
- Santo Contra los Zombis (Santo versus the Zombies, 1962, Luchador/Wrestler)
