= Mexican National Heavyweight Championship =

Professional wrestling championship

- The championship belt

Details
- Promotion: Comisión de Box y Lucha Libre Mexico D.F. (Sanctioning body); CMLL (1933–1996); AAA (1996–2008); Mexican Independent circuit (2009–2013); CMLL (2017–present)
- Date established: 1926
- Current champion: Esfinge
- Date won: October 27, 2026
Statistics
- First champion: Francisco Aguayo
- Most reigns: El Halcón (5 times)
- Longest reign: Cien Caras (1,483 days)
- Shortest reign: El Halcón (24 days)

The Mexican National Heavyweight Championship (called the Campeonato Nacional de Peso Completo in Spanish) is a Mexican professional wrestling championship created and sanctioned by the Mexico City Boxing and Wrestling Commission (Spanish: Comisión de Box y Lucha Libre México D.F.). While the Commission sanctions the title, it does not promote the events in which the Championship is defended. From 1933 until the mid-1990s, Consejo Mundial de Lucha Libre (CMLL) controlled the Championship, since then AAA gained control of the championship, after the Commission granted them control of the championship. In 2006 the championship was abandoned and replaced by the AAA Mega Championship. In 2009 the championship became active again on the Mexican Independent circuit until 2013. CMLL brought the championship back in 2017. Since the championship is designated as a heavyweight title, the championship can only officially be competed for by wrestlers weighing at least 105 kg (231 lb). However, the regulation is not strictly adhered to. The current champion is Esfinge, who is in his first reign. He won the title by defeating Akuma on CMLL Martes Populares on October 27, 2026.

== Championship history ==
Being a professional wrestling championship, it is not won legitimately: it is instead won via a scripted ending to a match or awarded to a wrestler because of a storyline. The earliest documented use of the Mexican National Heavyweight Title was in 1926 and as such the Mexican National Heavyweight Championship was the oldest continuously promoted wrestling title in the world at the time of its inactivation. The earliest recorded champion was Francisco Aguayo who initially won the title under the name Frank Aguayo while wrestling in border on the US side. He later brought the belt with him to Mexico and on June 21, 1934, firmly established it as a Mexican-based championship with his victory over Manuel "El Toro" Hernández in the first championship match ever sanctioned by the Mexico City Boxing and Wrestling Commission. At that point Empresa Mexicana de Lucha Libre (EMLL, later renamed CMLL) was given the full promotional control of the title, with the Commission only being asked to approve the champions. (Note: In this, "control" refers to the everyday use of the title, determining which storylines the title is being used in, who gets to challenge for the title, and how to use it in a public relations sense.)

After Pierroth Jr. won the title in 1995, he left CMLL and signed with AAA, bringing the Mexican National Heavyweight Championship with him. When Máscara Sagrada became the champion in 1996, it was officially acknowledged by the Commission that AAA controlled the booking of the championship from that point forward. El Halcón, also billed as Halcón Ortiz and Super Halcón, has the record for most championship reigns, with five. On September 13, 2006, AAA created the new AAA Mega Championship, and the National title was not promoted in the promotion. The then champion, Charly Manson left AAA in 2009 and defended the title on the independent circuit. Manson later lost the championship to Héctor Garza who retained it until his death on May 23, 2013, after which it became inactive once more. In October 2017, CMLL announced that it was bringing the championship back under its control.

The current champion is Esfinge, who defeated Akuma on October 27, 2026. A total of 52 wrestlers have held the championship since its inception, resulting in 72 reigns. The longest Mexican National Heavyweight Championship reign belongs to Médico Asesino with a total of 1,378 days. El Halcón was champion for the shortest time, 24 days, but also holds the record for most reigns with five in total. Cien Caras's two combined reigns lasted 1,483 days, more than any other champion.

== Title history ==
Key
No.	Overall reign number
Reign	Reign number for the specific champion
Days	Number of days held
N/A	Unknown information
(NLT)	Championship change took place "no later than" the date listed
†	Championship change is unrecognized by the promotion
+	Current reign is changing daily

No.	Champion	Championship change			Reign statistics		Notes	Ref.
No.	Champion	Date	Event	Location	Reign	Days	Notes	Ref.
Consejo Mundial de Lucha Libre (CMLL)
1	Francisco Aguayo	1926 (n)	Live event	Unknown	1	N/A		
Championship history is unrecorded from 1926 to December, 1930.
2	Martinez Larrea	December, 1930 (n)	Live event	Unknown	1	N/A		
Championship history is unrecorded from 1931 to June 21, 1934.
3	Francisco Aguayo	June 21, 1934	Live event	Mexico City, Federal District	2	1,076-1,105	Defeated Manuel "El Toro" Hernández in the first sanctioned championship match on Mexican soil.	
4	Yaqui Joe	June 1937	Live event	Mexico City, Distrito Federal	1	N/A		
5	Francisco Aguayo	July 1, 1937	Live event	Unknown	3	1,072		
—	Vacated	June 7, 1940	—	—	—	—	Championship vacated for undocumented reasons	
6	Firpo Segura	After June 7, 1940	Live event	Mexico City, Federal District	1	366-937	Defeated Doc Macias	
7	Rye Duran	1942	Live event	Morelia, Michoacán	1	960-1,324		
8	Firpo Segura	August 17, 1945	Live event	Mexico City, Federal District	2	407		
9	Steve Morgan	September 28, 1946	EMLL 13th Anniversary Show	Mexico City, Federal District	1	175		
10	Firpo Segura	March 22, 1947	Live event	Mexico City, Federal District	3	902		
11	Daniel Aldana	September 9, 1949	Live event	Mexico City, Federal District	1	844-1,209		
12	Firpo Segura	1952	Live event	Cuernavaca, Morelos	4	589-954		
13	Joaquin Murrieta	August 12, 1954	Live event	N/A	1	215		
—	Vacated	March 15, 1955	—	—	—	—	Championship vacated for undocumented reasons	
14	Médico Asesino	September 7, 1956	Live event	Mexico City, Federal District	1	1,378	Defeated Gran Lothario in a tournament final	
—	Vacated	June 16, 1960	—	—	—	—	Title vacated when Médico Asesino died	
15	Pepe Mendieta	May 13, 1962	Live event	Mexico City, Federal District	1	1.023-1.053	Defeated Henry Pilusso in a tournament final	
—	Vacated	March 1965	—	—	—	—	Title vacated when Mendieta retired	
16	Chico Casasola	April 13, 1965	Live event	Guadalajara, Jalisco	1	334	Defeated Pantera Negra in a tournament final	
17	Pantera Negra	March 13, 1966	Live event	Guadalajara, Jalisco	1	177		
17	Black Gordman	September 6, 1966	Live event	Ciudad Victoria, Tamaulipas	1	57		
19	Polo Torres	November 2, 1966	Live event	Torreón, Coahuila	1	362		
20	Henry Pilusso	October 30, 1967	Live event	Ciudad Juárez, Chihuahua	1	517		
21	Great Goliath	March 30, 1969	Live event	Ciudad Juárez, Chihuahua	1	309		
22	Raul Reyes	February 2, 1970	Live event	Monterrey, Nuevo León	1	795		
23	Ángel Blanco	April 7, 1972	Live event	Mexico City, Federal District	1	567		
24	Enrique Vera	October 26, 1973	Live event	Mexico City, Federal District	1	502		
25	Raul Reyes	March 12, 1975	Live event	Acapulco, Guerrero	1	198		
26	El Halcón	September 26, 1975	EMLL 42nd Anniversary Show (2)	Mexico City, Federal District	1	534		
27	Gran Markus	March 13, 1977	Live event	Guadalajara, Jalisco	1	103		
28	El Halcón	June 24, 1977	Live event	Mexico City, Federal District	2	177		
29	Raúl Mata	December 18, 1977	Live event	Monterrey, Nuevo León	1	195		
30	El Nazi	July 1, 1978	Live event	Monterrey, Nuevo León	1	118		
31	TNT	October 27, 1978	Live event	Mexico City, Federal District	1	100		
32	Gran Markus	February 4, 1979	Live event	Mexico City, Federal District	2	322		
33	El Halcón	December 23, 1979	Live event	Torreón, Coahuila	3	24		
34	Tony Benetto	January 16, 1980	Live event	Acapulco, Guerrero	1	192		
35	Cien Caras	July 26, 1980	Live event	Puebla, Puebla	1	610		
36	Herodes	March 28, 1982	Live event	Mexico City, Federal District	1	84		
37	Halcón Ortiz	June 20, 1982	Live event	Guadalajara, Jalisco	4	413		
38	Pirata Morgan	August 7, 1983	Live event	Guadalajara, Jalisco	1	154		
39	Rayo de Jalisco Jr.	January 8, 1984	Live event	Mexico City, Federal District	1	82		
40	Cien Caras	March 30, 1984	Live event	Mexico City, Federal District	1	873		
41	Alfonso Dantés	August 20, 1986	Live event	Acapulco, Guerrero	1	379		
42	Super Halcón	September 3, 1987	Live event	Guadalajara, Jalisco	5	105		
43	Gran Markus Jr.	December 17, 1987	Live event	Acapulco, Guerrero	2	234	Previously won the title as "Tony Benetto"	
44	Alfonso Dantés	August 7, 1988	Live event	Guadalajara, Jalisco	1	206–236		
—	Vacated	March 1989	—	—	—	—	Title vacated when Alfonso Dantés retired	
45	Popitekus	May 21, 1989	Live event	Mexico City, Federal District	1	414		
46	Gran Markus Jr.	July 9, 1990	Live event	Mexico City, Federal District	3	40		
47	Rayo de Jalisco Jr.	October 17, 1990	Live event	Acapulco, Guerrero	2	178		
48	El Egipcio	April 13, 1991	Live event	Puebla, Puebla	1	427		
49	Rayo de Jalisco Jr.	June 13, 1992	Live event	Mexico City, Federal District	3	986		
50	Pierroth Jr.	February 24, 1995	Live event	Puebla, Puebla	1	574		
Lucha Libre AAA Worldwide (AAA)
51	Máscara Sagrada	September 20, 1996	Live event	Actopan, Hidalgo	1	275		
52	Cibernético	June 22, 1997	Live event	Mexico City, Federal District	1	245		
53	Perro Aguayo	February 22, 1998	Live event	Chihuahua City, Chihuahua	1	358		
54	El Cobarde II	February 15, 1999	Live event	Nuevo Laredo, Tamaulipas	1	246		
55	Latin Lover	October 19, 1999	Live event	Ciudad Acuña, Coahuila	1	929		
56	Héctor Garza	May 5, 2002	Live event	Ciudad Victoria, Tamaulipas	1	365		
57	El Zorro	May 5, 2003	Live event	Monterrey, Nuevo León	1	236		
58	Pirata Morgan	December 27, 2003	Live event	Oaxaca City, Oaxaca	1	39		
59	El Zorro	February 4, 2004	Live event	Veracruz, Veracruz	2	137		
60	Mr. Águila	June 20, 2004	Triplemanía XII	Naucalpan, México	1	42		
61	El Zorro	August 1, 2004	Live event	Guadalajara, Jalisco	3	672		
62	Charly Manson	June 4, 2006	Triplemanía XIV	Pachuca, Hidalgo	1	1,358	AAA declared the title vacant after Manson's loss in the 2007 tournament to decide the inaugural AAA Mega Champion. However, Manson continued to defend the championship in independent promotions.	
63	X-Fly	February 21, 2010	La Revolucion	Ecatepec de Morelos, Mexico State	1	723		
64	Héctor Garza	February 14, 2012	Perros del Mal Producciones	Pachuca, Hidalgo	2	467	This was a six-way elimination match, also involving El Hijo del Perro Aguayo, El Mesías, El Texano Jr. and Toscano.	
—	Deactivated	May 26, 2013	—	—	—	—	Héctor Garza died while holding the championship.	
Consejo Mundial de Lucha Libre (CMLL)
65	El Terrible	October 29, 2017	Domingos Arena Mexico	Mexico City, Mexico	1	1,062	Terrible defeated Diamante Azul in a tournament final.	
66	Diamante Azul	September 25, 2020	CMLL on Mexiquense	Mexico City, Mexico	1	320		
—	Vacated	August 11, 2021	—	—	—	—	Diamante Azul left the Consejo Mundial de Lucha Libre in may. On August 11, a tournament to determine a new champion was confirmed.	
67	Euforia	March 4, 2022	Viernes Arena Mexico	Mexico City, Mexico	1	28	Euforia defeated Gran Guerrero in a tournament final.	
68	El Terrible	April 1, 2022	Viernes Arena Mexico	Mexico City, Mexico	2	192		
69	El Sagrado	October 10, 2022	Lunes Arena Puebla	Puebla, Mexico	1	239		
70	Star Black	June 6, 2023	Martes de Arena Mexico	Mexico City, Mexico	1	661		
71	Akuma	March 28, 2025	Viernes Espectacular	Mexico City, Mexico	1	578		
72	Esfinge	October 27, 2026	CMLL Martes Populares	Mexico City, Mexico	1	13+		

== Combined reigns ==
†	Indicates the current champion.
¤	The exact length of the reign is uncertain.

Rank	Wrestler	No. of reigns	Combined days
1	Firpo Segura	4	2,264-3,200¤
2	Francisco Aguayo	3	2,148-2,177¤
3	Cien Caras	2	1,483
4	Médico Asesino	1	1,378
5	Charly Manson	1	1,358
6	El Halcón	5	1,253
7	Rayo de Jalisco Jr.	3	1,246
8	El Terrible	2	1,254
9	El Zorro	3	1,045
10	Pepe Mendieta	1	1.023-1.053¤
11	Raul Reyes	2	993
12	Latin Lover	1	929
13	Héctor Garza	2	832
14	X-Fly	1	723
15	Star Black	1	661
16	Alfonso Dantés	2	585-615¤
17	Akuma	1	578
18	Pierroth Jr.	1	574
19	Ángel Blanco	1	567
20	Henry Pilusso	1	517
21	Enrique Vera	1	502
22	El Egipcio	1	427
23	Gran Markus	2	425
24	Popitekus	1	414
25	Polo Torres	1	362
26	Gran Markus Jr.	3	358
27	Perro Aguayo	1	358
28	Diamante Azul	1	320
29	Great Goliath	1	309
30	Máscara Sagrada	1	275
31	El Cobarde II	1	246
32	Cibernético	1	245
33	El Sagrado	1	239
34	Joaquin Murietta	1	215¤
35	Raúl Mata	1	195
36	Pirata Morgan	2	193
37	Tony Benetto	1	192
38	Pantera Negra	1	177
39	Steve Morgan	1	175
40	El Nazi	1	118
41	TNT	1	100
42	Black Gordman	1	57
43	Mr. Águila	1	42
44	Euforia	1	28
45	Esfinge †	1	13+
46	Chico Casaola	1	N/A
46	Daniel Aldana	1	N/A
46	Martinez Larrea	1	N/A
46	Rye Duran	1	960-1,324
46	Yaqui Joe	1	N/A
