= Jack O'Brien (wrestler) =

Mexican wrestler (1910–1982)

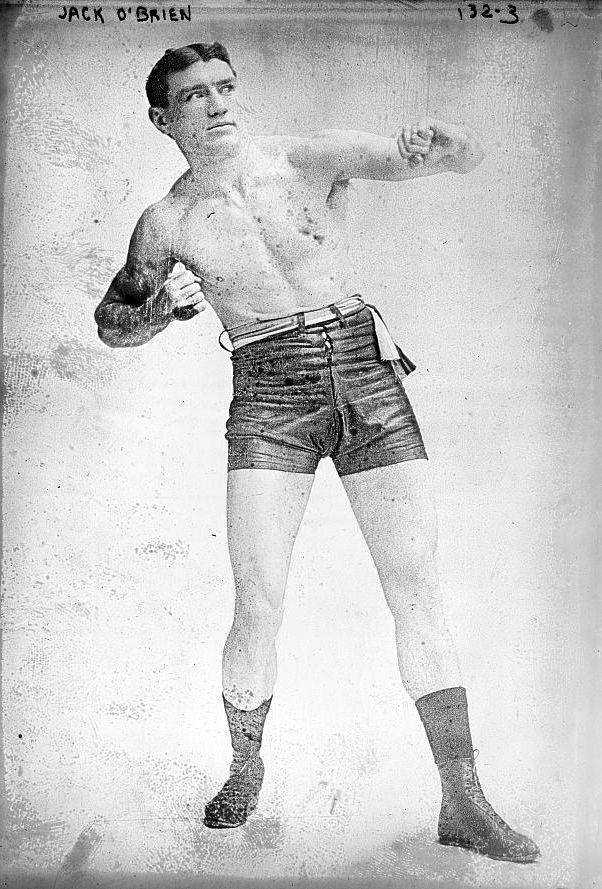

Personal information
- Born: Marcelo Andreani; February 8, 1910 Fossola, Carrara, Italy
- Died: September 24, 1982 (aged 72) Ciudad Juarez, Chihuahua, Mexico

Professional wrestling career
- Ring name(s): Jack O'Brien; Dr. O'Brian
- Billed height: 1.73 m (5 ft 8 in)
- Billed weight: 92 kg (203 lb)
- Debut: 1934
- Retired: 1956

Marcelo Andreani (February 8, 1910 – September 24, 1982) was a Mexican professional wrestler best known under the ring name "Roughouse" Jack O'Brien and worked mainly in Mexico for Empresa Mexicana de Lucha Libre (EMLL) where he held the Mexican National Lightweight Championship, Mexican National Welterweight Championship and NWA World Welterweight Championship twice during his career that spanned from 1934 until 1956. O'Brien is credited with inventing the Abdominal Stretch, or Tirabuzón (Spanish for "Corkscrew").

== Early life ==
Marcelo Andreani was born on February 8, 1910, in Fossola, Carrara, Italy. Andreani moved to Mexico with his family to study dental surgery and played baseball in his free time. Andreani was also a talented pole vaulter and swimmer.

In college, Andreani played American football for Pumas CU. A quarterback and safety, he was inducted into the Mexican Hall of Fame of American Football.

== Professional wrestling career ==
=== Empresa Mexicana de Lucha Libre (1930s–1950s) ===
By 1934 Andreani had obtained Mexican citizenship and made his professional wrestling debut in 1934, taking the ring name "Jack O'Brien". O'Brien's athletic background and charisma quickly made him a very popular and successful wrestler, so successful that he became the first ever Mexican National Lightweight Champion by defeating Dientes Hernández in the final of a tournament. O'Brien used a move called Tirabuzón, the Mexican version of the "Abdominal Stretch" which O'Brien is credited with introducing to professional wrestling. O'Brien held the Lightweight title from 1934 until June 28, 1937, when Dientes Hernández defeated him to win the championship. The following May O'Brian regained the Lightweight title and held it for two years before Bobby Bonales defeated him for the championship on May 5, 1940. After losing the lightweight championship O'Brien moved into the Welterweight division, probably the most prestigious weight class in Mexico at the time. On November 23, 1941, Jack O'Brien defeated Lobo Negro to win the Mexican National Welterweight Championship. O'Brien held the title for just over four months before losing it to Ciclón Veloz. After the loss of the Welterweight title O'Brien began a long running, very successful storyline feud with El Santo and Gory Guerrero, the team known as La Pareja Atómica ("The Atomic Pair"). On February 18, 1944, O'Brien defeated El Santo to win the Mexican National Welterweight Championship, a rare loss for El Santo at the time. El Santo gained a measure of revenge that same year when he defeated O'Brien in a Luchas de Apuesta, hair vs. mask match on April 8, forcing O'Brien to have his head shaved bald per Lucha Libre traditions. On April 20, 1945, Santo's partner Guerrero defeated O'Brien to win the Mexican Welterweight Championship. O'Brien participated in the tournament to crown the first ever World Welterweight Championship (a title that was later renamed the "NWA World Welterweight Championship" when EMLL joined the National Wrestling Alliance). O'Brien lost to El Santo in the final, but managed to win the title from El Santo on February 14, 1947. O'Brien held the World Welterweight title for over two years until losing it to Gory Guerrero on April 29, 1949.

=== National Wrestling Alliance (1950s) ===
After losing the Welterweight title O'Brien began teaming with Rito Romero, forming a team called La Pareja Perfecta ("The perfect team") by the fans and promoters alike for their smooth teamwork and timing. O'Brien also began wrestling in Texas around the same time, working for various Texas promotions under the name "Roughhouse" Jack O'Brien. In 1952 O'Brien appeared in his first Lucha film as he both acted and wrestled in the movie Huracán Ramírez, he was also one of the men that found Daniel Garzia to fill the role of the title star. He also appeared in two more movies El Enmascarado de Plata and La Bestia Maginfica. Along with acting O'Brian also tried his hand at promoting wrestling events in 1952, funded by the Televicentro network O'Brien and promoters Jesús Garza and Elías Krui were the first promoters to oppose Salvador Lutteroth's EMLL wrestling empire in Mexico. When funding for the promotion ran out O'Brien made peace with the Lutteroth family, retired from active wrestling and started working as a local promoter for EMLL in Acapulco, Guerrero and Mexico City. He later retired from promotion when he was offered a government job in Cuernavaca, Morelos by the newly elected governor, who was a college friend. O'Brien briefly returned to wrestling in the mid-1960s working as the enmascarado (masked) character "Doctor O'Brian", teaming with Doctor O'Borman. After his brief foray into wrestling he became the official doctor of the Ciudad Juarez, Chihuahua wrestling commission. O'Brien died on September 14, 1982.

== Championships and accomplishments ==
- Empresa Mexicana de Lucha Libre
  - Mexican National Lightweight Championship (2 times)
  - Mexican National Welterweight Championship (2 times)
  - NWA World Welterweight Championship (2 times)
- National Wrestling Alliance
  - NWA World Tag Team Championship (Georgia version) (1 time) – with Pierre LaSalle

== Luchas de Apuestas record ==
Winner (wager)	Loser (wager)	Location	Event	Date	Notes
El Santo (mask)	Jack O'Brien (hair)	Mexico City	EMLL show	April 8, 1944	
