= Tarzán López =

Mexican professional wrestler (1912 – 1975)

Personal information
- Born: Carlos López Tovar; August 28, 1912 Jerez, Zacatecas, Mexico
- Died: August 28, 1975 (aged 63)

Professional wrestling career
- Ring name(s): El Tarzán; Carlos Lopez; Tarzan Lopez
- Billed height: 1.73 m (5 ft 8 in)
- Billed weight: 84 kg (185 lb)
- Trained by: Gonzalo Avendaño
- Debut: April 12, 1934

Carlos López Tovar (28 August 1912 – 28 August 1975) was a Mexican professional wrestler. He was active in the 1930s and 1940s, better known by the ring name Tarzán López. Known as "Tarzan" because of his bodybuilder's physique, Lopez held the Mexican national welterweight championship from 1936 through 1939. He also captured the NWA middleweight title several times and was named MVP in Mexico in 1940, 1944, and 1948.

== Professional wrestling career ==
Carlos made his professional debut in 1934 under the name Carlos López, and was soon recruited by trainer Gonzalo Avendaño. He was launched into his first feud against Salvador Flores, a feud that made the young López very popular. This popularity eventually resulted in López being signed to Empresa Mexicana de la Lucha Libre (EMLL), where he gained his first title, the Mexican National Welterweight Championship, which he won on March 11, 1936.

López was one of the most popular professional wrestlers of his era, winning the title of Luchador of the Year in 1940, 1944, and 1948.

Although still one of the most popular professional wrestlers in Mexico, López's career ended early over a monetary dispute with EMLL. López requested a loan with which he intended to help a friend who desperately needed the money. When the owners of EMLL refused, an angry López retired from the professional wrestling business and never looked back.

== Championships and accomplishments ==
- Empresa Mexicana de la Lucha Libre
  - Mexican National Light Heavyweight Championship (3 times)
  - Mexican National Middleweight Championship (1 time)
  - Mexican National Tag Team Championship (1 time) – with Henry Pilusso
  - Mexican National Welterweight Championship (1 time)
  - NWA World Middleweight Championship (2 times)
  - NWA World Middlweight Championship (1 time)^{1}
  - World Middleweight Championship (2 times)^{2}
- Wrestling Observer Newsletter awards
  - Wrestling Observer Newsletter Hall of Fame (Class of 2004)

^{1}This championship was under the control of the National Wrestling Association, a governing body in professional wrestling that existed prior to the National Wrestling Alliance. The title was abandoned in 1940.
^{2}This title is actually the same championship that the National Wrestling Alliance would come to adopt and recognize. However, the title was created before the founding of the National Wrestling Alliance but after the World Middleweight Championship used by the National Wrestling Association was abandoned.
