= La venganza de Huracán Ramírez =

1969 film by Joselito Rodríguez

- Directed by: Joselito Rodríguez
- Written by: Juan Rodríguez Mas (credited as Juan R. Mas); Joselito Rodríguez
- Produced by: Juan Rodríguez Mas
- Starring: Pepe Romay; Titina Romay; David Silva; Carmelita González; Jean Safont; Freddy Fernández; Tonina Jackson; Carolina Barret; Karina Duprez
- Cinematography: Ezequiel Carrasco
- Edited by: Fernando Martínez
- Music by: Sergio Guerrero
- Distributed by: Cinematográfica Roma; Películas Rodríguez
- Release date: 27 February 1969 (Mexico)
- Running time: 87 minutes
- Country: Mexico
- Language: Spanish

La venganza de Huracán Ramírez (in English, "The Revenge of Hurricane Ramírez") is a 1969 Mexican lucha libre film co-written and directed by Joselito Rodríguez, and starring Pepe Romay, Titina Romay, David Silva, Jean Safont, Freddy Fernández and Tonina Jackson. It is part of a series of films centered on the character of Mexican masked luchador Huracán Ramírez, which began with Huracán Ramírez (1952).

== Plot ==
The film consists of various plots, which are as follows:

- Mad scientist Landru (Jean Safont) subjects himself and his two assistants to experiments that turn them into beasts, and they test the results by facing a couple of luchadores, Huracán Ramírez and Tonina Jackson, in a series of matches. Fernando Torres (David Silva), the man who wrestles as "Huracán Ramírez", is in financial difficulty, leading him to agree to participate in Landru's matches.
- Fernando's son Pancho (Pepe Romay), a college engineering student, works in an auto repair shop during the semester break. He makes friends with Gina (Karina Duprez), the owner's daughter, incurring the wrath of the shop's boss Hernández (José Luis Caro), Gina's rejected suitor.
- Fernando's daughter Margarita (Titina Romay) begins a pop singing career under the name "Margot de Córdova". She is discovered in a record shop by Pepe Chico (Carlos Piñar), the son of a network head, who gets her a spot on a television show on the network, but lets Margarita think that he's just Pepe Chico's "friend". Margarita's relationship with Pepe causes the jealousy of Margarita's friend and suitor, Pichi (Freddy Fernández).
- Obnoxious gringa Mary (Carolina Barret), who has attached herself to Tonina Jackson. She loans him money to pay the wrestling arena's debts, and declares herself owner of the cafe run by Fernando's wife Laura (Carmelita González) as a result. When she attempts to change the cafe to her image, she causes a conflict between herself and Laura.

== Cast ==
- Pepe Romay as Pancho Torres
- Titina Romay as Margarita Torres/Margot de Córdova
- David Silva as Fernando Torres/Huracán Ramírez
  - Daniel García portrays Huracán Ramírez in wrestling scenes (uncredited)
- Carmelita González as Laura
- Jean Safont as Professor Landru
- Freddy Fernández as Pichi (as Fredy Fernandez "Pichi")
- Tonina Jackson as himself
- Carolina Barret as Mary
- Marco Antonio Arzate as Landru's bearded assistant/Man with baton
- José Luis Caro as Hernández (as José Luis Carol)
- Karina Duprez as Gina
- Emma Rodríguez
- Queta Carrasco (as Enriqueta Carrasco)
- Felipe del Castillo
- Manuel Trejo Morales
- Carlos Piñar as Pepe Chico
- Antonio Padilla "Pícoro" as Ring Announcer (as Pícoro)

== Production ==
The film is part of a series of wrestling films centered around the fictitious Huracán Ramírez character, created by director Joselito Rodríguez and his son Juan Rodríguez Más, that began with Huracán Ramírez (1952). This is the last film in the series in which actor David Silva and his character Fernando Torres, the man who in-story dons the Huracán Ramírez mask, would appear; neither Silva nor his character would appear in the remaining two theatrical Huracán Ramírez films, Huracán Ramírez y la monjita negra and De sangre chicana. This is also the last film in the series in which Tonina Jackson appeared, as he died in 1969 (the film was shot in 1967).

In an edition of The Mexican Film Bulletin, David E. Wilt speculated that the sci-fi, fantastic and horror themes of the film were the result of the popularity of the El Santo and Blue Demon films, which featured similar fantastic themes.

== Reception ==
David E. Wilt in The Mexican Film Bulletin wrote about the film that "La venganza de Huracán Ramírez isn't poorly made but rarely have 90 minutes been crammed with so many disparate elements". Wilt said in regards of the Pancho sub-plot that the film "spends (wastes) a lot of time on Pancho", but that ultimately the Margarita and Mary sub-plots "run neck-and-neck for the 'most annoying' honors. Titina Romay is introduced gushingly as a 'great new young discovery' but her singing is weak at best; her relationship with Carlos Piñar is unbelievable (she never even gets his name but follows his direction unquestioningly), and Freddy Fernández is mostly a pain to watch as her jealous boyfriend. On the other hand, Carolina Barret's performance as the middle-aged gringa also grates on the nerves exceedingly, and the final food fight is hardly a hilarious climax to this part of the film." Wilt ultimately concluded that the main Landru plot "has some major holes (such as his ultimate purpose, how a wrestler became a scientist or a scientist became a wrestler, why he enters into a contract with Fernando in the first place, and so on) and is quite derivative of earlier wrestling movies (Ladrón de Cadáveres, for example), but if it had been developed and made the main point of the movie, this would have been a more mainstream lucha adventure. As it stands, the picture is a comedy-melodrama with sports drama andscience-fiction overtones (and music!). Hard to think of an audience for that particular combination."

== Bibliography ==
- Wilt, David E. (December 2006). "The Mexican Film Bulletin" (PDF). 12 (8).
