= Huracán Ramírez y la monjita negra =

1973 film by Joselito Rodríguez

- Directed by: Joselito Rodríguez
- Screenplay by: Joselito Rodríguez
- Story by: Mario Duncan
- Produced by: Juan Rodríguez Mas (credited as Ing. Juan Rodriguez Mas)
- Starring: Pepe Romay; Titina Romay; Jean Safont; Queta Carrasco; Martha Rangel; Teresa Velázquez
- Cinematography: Agustín Jiménez
- Edited by: Carlos Savage
- Music by: Sergio Guerrero
- Distributed by: Cinematográfica Roma
- Release date: 4 July 1973 (Mexico)
- Running time: 97 minutes
- Country: Mexico
- Language: Spanish

Huracán Ramírez y la monjita negra (in English, "Huracán Ramírez and the Little Black Nun") is a 1973 Mexican lucha libre film written and directed by Joselito Rodríguez, and starring Pepe Romay, Titina Romay and Teresa Velázquez. The film is part of a series of films centered on the character of Mexican masked professional wrestler Huracán Ramírez, which began with Huracán Ramírez (1952).

== Plot ==
A mute orphan who lives in a convent establishes a friendship with a black novice (Titina Romay) newcomer to the convent, and helps her obtain the money necessary save the convent by moonlighning as the masked luchador Huracán Ramírez. Meanwhile, a rich woman (Teresa Velázquez), who uses the nun as an unwitting pawn to perpetrate her crimes as a con artist, tries to seduce him.

== Cast ==
- Pepe Romay as José
- Titina Romay as Sor María de la Divina Concepción
- Jean Safont as Sansón Pérez "el Elegante"
- Queta Carrasco as Mother Superior Brígida
- Juan Garza as René Ancira
- Carmen Manzano as Sor Rita
- Carlos Bravo y Fernández as Doctor (as Carlos Bravo Carlhillos)
- Luis Del Río
- Carlos Nieto as Said Slim
- Roberto Meyer as Padre Bernabé
- Carlos Rincón Gallardo as Hotel Clerk (as Carlos Rincon G.)
- Ethel Medina
- Martha Rangel (as Martita Rangel)
- Guillermo García
- Xavier Alcaraz
- Teresa Velázquez as Deborah de Iturbide (as Tere Velázquez)
- Antonio Padilla "Pícoro" as Ring Announcer (uncredited)

=== Wrestlers ===
- El Nazi
- El Matemático
- Doctor Zee
- Tony Salazar
- Valentino
- El Aguila
- El Mosca
- Sheik Mar Allah
- Daniel García as Huracán Ramírez (uncredited)

== Production ==
The film is part of a series of wrestling films centered around the fictitious Huracán Ramírez character, created by director Joselito Rodríguez and his son Juan Rodríguez Más, that began with Huracán Ramírez (1952). Although actor David Silva portrayed in previous films the role of Fernando Torres, the man who in-story dons the Huracán Ramírez mask, Silva does not appear in this film, and instead a new mute character is introduced donning the mask. Silva would likewise not appear in the next and final theatrical Huracán Ramírez film, De sangre chicana.

== Reception ==
Several reviews of the film have considered it as the worst film of the Huracán Ramírez film series. In David Silva: un campeón de mil rostros by Rafael Aviña, Aviña describes the film series as "a series of films which would degenerate in an aberrant way in Huracán Ramírez y la monjita negra." The book ¡Quiero ver sangre!: Historia ilustrada del cine de luchadores speculated that the reason David Silva did not participate in this film and De sangre chicana (and the later direct-to-video film Huracán Ramírez vs. los terroristas) was "not because of the money, but because the plots were just slimy." Nelson Carro's El cine de luchadores echoed a sentiment similar to Aviña's, stating that the series would "end up totally degenerating" in this film. The magazine Dosfilos described the film series stating that after the character's first appearance in its namesake film, "there would be other less fortunate, although funny ones, such as El misterio de Huracán Ramírez, and the frankly horrendous and forgettable ones, like Huracán Ramírez y la monjita negra." In El cine que el viento se llevó, Miguel Carrara singled out Titina Romay's performance and the fact that she wore blackface to play the title role of the "black nun", sarcastically describing the film as the one "in which Titina Romay remembered that she was the chocolate girl in Angelitos negros", referencing that Romay also wore blackface in that film, where she portrayed a dark-skinned child. David E. Wilt in The Mexican Film Bulletin was more benevolent, however, saying, "Huracán Ramírez y la monjita negra isn't a bad film, and—to be fair—was advertised as a comedy rather than a lucha action picture. The acting is broad but within acceptable limits, and the production values are satisfactory."
