= 1959 in professional wrestling =

1959 in professional wrestling describes the year's events in the world of professional wrestling.

== List of notable promotions ==
Only one promotion held notable shows in 1959.

Promotion Name	Abbreviation
Empresa Mexicana de Lucha Libre	EMLL

== Notable events ==
- Wrestling at the Chase debuted on KPLR-TV in St. Louis, Missouri. The series would run for almost 25 years.
- Wrestling Revue magazine premiered at newsstands.

== Calendar of notable shows ==
Date	Promotion(s)	Event	Location	Main event
April	EMLL	3. Aniversario de Arena México	Mexico City, Mexico	
September 25	EMLL	EMLL 26th Anniversary Show	Mexico City, Mexico	Cavernario Galindo defeated Torbellino Blanco in a best two-out-of-three falls Lucha de Apuesta hair vs. hair match

== Championship changes ==
=== EMLL ===
NWA World Light Heavyweight Championship
incoming champion - Dory Dixon
Date	Winner	Event/Show	Note(s)
September 11	Ray Mendoza	EMLL show	

NWA World Middleweight Championship
incoming champion – Ronaldo Vera
No title changes

NWA World Welterweight Championship
incoming champion – Karloff Lagarde
No title changes

Mexican National Heavyweight Championship
incoming champion - El Médico Asesino
No title changes

Mexican National Middleweight Championship
incoming champion – El Santo
No title changes

Mexican National Lightweight Championship
incoming champion – Juan Diaz
No title changes

Mexican National Light Heavyweight Championship
incoming champion – Espectro I
No title changes

Mexican National Welterweight Championship
incoming champion – Karloff Lagarde
Date	Winner	Event/Show	Note(s)
February 13	Blue Demon	EMLL show	
February 27	Karloff Lagarde	EMLL show	

Mexican National Tag Team Championship
incoming champion – Espectro I and Ray Mendoza
Date	Winner	Event/Show	Note(s)
Uncertain	Unknown	N/A	
Uncertain	Tarzán López and Henry Pilusso	EMLL show	

Mexican National Women's Championship
incoming champion – Uncertain
Date	Winner	Event/Show	Note(s)
Uncertain	Rosita Williams	EMLL show	
Uncertain	Irma González	EMLL show	

=== NWA ===
NWA Worlds Heavyweight Championship
Incoming Champion – Dick Hutton
Date	Winner	Event/Show	Note(s)
January 9	Pat O'Connor	NWA show	

== Debuts ==
- Debut date uncertain:
  - Bruno Sammartino
  - Great Goliath
  - Adnan Al-Kaissie
  - Tony Charles
- October 7– Danny Hodge

== Births ==
- Date of birth uncertain:
  - Super Maxx
- January 1:
  - Steve Cox
  - Candi Devine(died in 2022)
- January 3 – Art Crews
- January 15 – Ken Wayne
- January 19 – Peggy Lee Leather (died in 2023)
- January 24 – Akira Maeda
- January 29 – Boris Zhukov
- February 3 – Haku
- February 4:
  - Ed Gantner(died in 1990)
  - Lawrence Taylor
- February 8 – Misty Blue Simmes
- February 15 – Hugo Savinovich
- February 28 – Rick Link (died in 2026)
- March 2 – Lola González
- March 7 – Sgt. Craig Pittman
- March 8 – Maki Ueda (wrestler)
- March 9 – Nikita Koloff
- March 16 – Scott L. Schwartz (died in 2024)
- March 20 – Sting
- March 21 – Tony Stetson
- March 23 – Joey Jackson
- March 29 – Michael Hayes
- April 4 – Jeannie Clark
- April 14 – Jesse Barr
- April 16 – Gran Apache(died in 2017)
- April 18 – Debbie Combs
- April 27 – Mad Maxine
- May 1 – Scott McGhee
- May 9 – Rudy Diamond (died in 2025)
- May 19 – Vicky Carranza
- May 21 – Sean Mooney
- June 11 – Magnum T. A.
- June 13 – Danny Fargo (died in 2003)
- June 14 – Buzz Sawyer(died in 1992)
- June 16 – The Ultimate Warrior(died in 2014)
- June 18 – Johnny Lee Clary (died in 2014)
- June 30 – Víctor Quiñones(died in 2006)
- July 6 – El Torero
- July 8 – Don Nakaya Nielsen (died in 2017)
- July 9 – Kevin Nash
- July 10:
  - Duane Gill
  - Eric Embry
- July 15 – Ranger Ross
- July 17:
  - DJ Peterson(died in 1993)
  - Randy Anderson(died in 2002)
- July 31 – Jason the Terrible
- August 13 – Danny Bonaduce
- August 16 – Dennis Koslowski
- August 18 – Tom Prichard
- August 19 – Tim Horner
- August 26 – Gary Young
- September 23 – Hans Nijman (died in 2014)
- October 6 – Barry Darsow
- October 7 – Brazo de Oro(died in 2017)
- October 18:
  - Nord the Barbarian
  - Carlos Cabrera
- October 21 – John Tatum
- October 24 – Dave Meltzer
- November 6 – Máscara Sagrada
- November 9 – Nick Patrick
- November 11 – Van Hammer (died in 2026)
- November 21 – Jerry Flynn
- December 11 – Doug Furnas(died in 2012)
- December 13 – Ricky Lawless (died in 1988)
- December 24 – Ángel Mortal

== Deaths ==
- November 7 - Victor McLaglen, 72
- November 21 - Max Baer (boxer), 50
