= Tonina Jackson =

Mexican actor & wrestler (1917–1969)

Personal information
- Born: Héctor Garza Lozano Vela; January 9, 1917 Monterrey, Nuevo León, Mexico
- Died: November 2, 1969 (aged 52)

Professional wrestling career
- Ring name(s): Great Tonina; Tonina Jackson; Gordo Lozano; Garza Lozano; Pancho Morales; Great JoJo; Gordo Chichihua
- Billed weight: 136 kg (300 lb)

Héctor Garza Lozano Vela (January 9, 1917 – November 2, 1969), better known under the ring name Tonina Jackson, was a Mexican actor and professional wrestler. He was nicknamed Cara de niño ("Baby face") and worked under such names as Héctor Lozano, Gordo Lozano and Pancho Morales in the Southern United States. He is not related to a wrestler known as "Tonina Jackson Jr." who made his debut in the 21st century.

The height of his success was in the 1950s and early 1960s where he even had a soft drink named after himself, the "Tonina". He also appeared in a number of lucha films, including the first four films of the Huracán Ramírez series.

== Professional wrestling career ==
Lozano's first recorded match as a professional wrestler took place in 1940 where he defeated Ray Zavalza at show in Tampico, Tamaulipas, using the ring name Tonina Jackson. In subsequent years Lozano worked for various professional wrestling promotions across the United States under a number of different names. In 1942 he used the ring name "Great JoJo" while competing in New York.

In 1945 he began working for the Roy Welch promotion in Alabama, becoming a mainstay for the promotion under the name "Garza Lozano". While working for Roy Welch he often teamed up with Jack Purdin. The duo defeated Herb and Roy Welch to win the Welch promotion's World Tag Team Championship on April 30, 1945. Months later it was reported that the duo won the promotion's Southern Tag Team Championship, defending it against Nick Carter and Sailor Watkins on November 26, 1945. Records are unclear as to whether or not it was the same championship belts that were used with a slightly different name. It is unclear when the two lost either championship. In 1949 he began working for the Kansas City-based Central States Wrestling, and would later work for them under the name "Great Tonino".

In the early 1950s he began working regularly in Mexico as well, becoming headliner for Empresa Mexicana de Lucha Libre (EMLL). At some point he defeated Indio peon in a Lucha de Apuestas, or "bet match", forcing Indio peon to have all his hair shaved off as a result. During this time he developed a long running, intense storyline feud with masked wrestler Médico Asesino, propelling Jackson to the main event position and making him very popular with the fans as he fought against the "evil" Médico Asesino. On July 26, 1952, Jackson was forced to have his hair shaved off as he lost a Lucha de Apuestas match to Médico Asesino In 1955 Lozano, billed as Great Tonina, worked for several southern California promotions, including several matches against Nick Bockwinkel. He later worked for Southwest Sports in Texas, splitting his time between the US and Mexico.

On April 20, 1960, Jackson lost his third and last Lucha de Apuestas match on record when he was defeated by the masked Torbellino Blanco and once again had to have his hair shaved off. He wrestled in World Wide Wrestling Federation as Gordo Chihuahua from 1962 to 1963. His last known match took place on July 3, 1968, in Florida.

== Acting career ==
In 1952 Lozano was one of the lead characters in one of the earliest lucha films, Huracán Ramírez, where he portrayed Señor Torres, an aging wrestler known as "Tonina Jackson", the father of the title character Huracán Ramírez, played by David Silva. He later reprised his role as the father of Huracán Ramírez in three additional movies; El misterio de Huracán Ramírez (The mystery of Hurricane Ramirez) in 1952, El hijo de Huracán Ramírez (The Son of Hurricane Ramirez) in 1965 and La Venganza del Huracán Ramírez (The vengeance of Hurricane Ramirez) in 1967. For the sequel Daniel García, took over the role as Ramírez, leading to Lozano and García becoming close friends and often teamed together.

Lozano also had a part in El bello durmiente (The Beautiful Dreamer) in 1952, a non-Lucha movie, as well as the 1952 movie El luchador fenómeno (The phenomenal wrestler), a wrestling comedy. At one point Lozano acted in several episode of the Mexican television show La Tremenda Corte (The Tremendous Courthouse). Due to his popular film roles, as well as his stature as a wrestler, a Mexican soda company named a soft drink, the "Tonina", after him.

== Death ==
Héctor Lozano died on November 3, 1969.

== Filmography ==
- Huracán Ramírez (Hurricane Ramirez) (1952)
- El bello durmiente (The Beautiful Dreamer) (1952)
- El luchador fenómeno (The phenomenal wrestler) (1952)
- El misterio de Huracán Ramírez (The mystery of Hurricane Ramirez) (1962)
- El hijo de Huracán Ramírez (The Son of Hurricane Ramirez) (1965)
- La Venganza del Huracán Ramírez (The vengeance of Hurricane Ramirez) (1967)

== Championships and accomplishments ==
- NWA Mid-America

- NWA Southern Tag Team Championship (1 time, first) – with Jack Purdin
- NWA World Tag Team Championship (Mid-America version) (1 time) – with Jack Purdin

== Luchas de Apuestas record ==
Winner (wager)	Loser (wager)	Location	Event	Date	Notes
Tonina Jackson (hair)	Indeo Peon (hair)	Tamaulipas, Mexico	Live event	N/A	
Médico Asesino (mask)	Tonina Jackson (hair)	Mexico City	Live event	July 26, 1952	
Torbellino Blanco (mask)	Tonina Jackson (hair)	San Antonio, Texas	Live event	April 20, 1960	
