= Huracán Ramírez (disambiguation) =

Huracán Ramírez was the ring name of masked professional wrestler Daniel García Arteaga.

Huracán Ramírez may also refer to:

- Huracán Ramírez (character), a fictional film character played by a number of actors and wrestlers over the years
- Huracán Ramírez (film), a 1952 black-and-white Mexican Lucha film where the character was first introduced

== See also ==
- Ciclón Ramirez (born 1961), Mexican wrestler inspired by the character
