= Angelitos negros =

Angelitos negros may refer to:

- Angelitos negros (1948 film), a Mexican drama film directed by Joselito Rodriguez
- Angelitos negros (1970 film), a Mexican drama film also directed by Rodriguez, a remake of the former
- Angelitos negros (TV series), a 1970 Mexican telenovela
- Píntame angelitos negros, a poem by Andrés Eloy Blanco, set to music as "Angelitos Negros"
