= El alma no tiene color =

Mexican telenovela

- Genre: Telenovela; Romance; Drama
- Created by: Joselito Rodríguez; Alberto Gómez
- Written by: Alberto Gómez; Ricardo Tejeda
- Directed by: Otto Sirgo; Antulio Jiménez Pons
- Starring: Laura Flores; Arturo Peniche; Celia Cruz; Lorena Rojas; Claudia Islas
- Opening theme: "El alma no tiene color" by Laura Flores & Marco Antonio Solís
- Country of origin: Mexico
- Original language: Spanish
- No. of episodes: 90

Production
- Executive producer: Juan Osorio
- Producer: Pablo Noceda Pérez
- Production locations: Filming; Televisa San Ángel; Mexico City; Mexico
- Cinematography: Carlos Guerra Villareal; Óscar Morales; Antulio Jiménez Pons; Javier Rodríguez; Gilberto Macín
- Running time: 41–44 minutes (episodes 1–80); 21–22 minutes (episodes 81–100)
- Production company: Televisa

Original release
- Network: Canal de las Estrellas
- Release: June 23 – November 7, 1997

Related
- Angelitos negros (1948); Angelitos negros (1970, film); Angelitos negros (1970, TV series)

El alma no tiene color (International Title: A Soul Without Prejudice) is a Mexican telenovela produced by Juan Osorio for Televisa in 1997. It is based on an original story by Alberto Gómez, inspired by the 1948 Mexican film Angelitos negros.

On Monday, June 23, 1997, Canal de las Estrellas started broadcasting El alma no tiene color weekdays at 5:00pm, replacing Los hijos de nadie. The last episode was broadcast on Friday, November 7, 1997 with Huracán replacing it the following Monday.

Laura Flores, Arturo Peniche and Celia Cruz starred as protagonists, while Lorena Rojas, Claudia Islas, Ofelia Guilmáin, Rafael Rojas, and Carlos Cámara starred as antagonists.

== Plot ==
The story deals with issues related to racism by narrating the story of Guadalupe Roldán, daughter of Don Humberto Roldán and "La Negra Macaria", whom she takes as her nanny. Guadalupe, by an agreement between her family and the Álamo family to save her father from financial ruin, is forced to abandon her boyfriend, Luis Diego Morales, a teacher of modest means, and marry Lisandro del Álamo, a Rich and powerful man for whom Guadalupe has no love. But over time, Guadalupe develops strong feelings for him.

Guadalupe, when she becomes pregnant, thinks that Lisandro is the happiest man in the world. But when her child is born, she turns out to be a dark-skinned girl and Lisandro abandons Guadalupe, accusing her of adultery. Don Humberto coerces Macaria to maintain Guadalupe's true affiliation and Macaria is in no position to tell Lisandro that it is ancestry and not adultery responsible for the baby being dark-skinned.

Among this, Ana Luisa Roldán appears, Guadalupe's cousin who hates her, bringing tragedies to Guadalupe's life, takes Luis Diego from her and makes Lisandro believe that he is not the father of her daughter Estrellita. Don Humberto falls into depression and alcoholism due to the absence of his wife Sara and the disappearance of his other daughter, Sarita, whom his grandmother took very far.

Lisandro discovers that Estrellita is his daughter through Macaria, who explains that she is Guadalupe's mother. The couple reconciles but before running away from the Roldán family with Macaria.

One day, Lisandro discovers that Guadalupe works as a singer for the club "Sapo Enamorado" and sees her with bad eyes, and through an Ana Luisa trap, ends up spending the night with her. Ana Luisa pretends to be pregnant, so Lisandro agrees to marry her. Guadalupe decides to divorce him, since she does not want to leave a child without a father.

Ana Luisa poisons Lisandro's heart, making her see that if Guadalupe stays with the baby, Luis Diego will be the only father figure she will have, so that Lisandro obtains sole custody of Estrellita. However, Ana Luisa is not willing to be the mother of a black girl, so with the help of Luis Diego, her mother, Begoña Roldán, and Lisandro's ex-girlfriend, kidnap the girl and abandon her in Mexico City.

Before long, Sara finds the girl and decides to adopt her without knowing that she is her niece. When she informs Rodrigo, Lisandro's cousin, that she found a girl of color, she tells Lisandro about the find, and Lisandro decides to go to Mexico City without telling Guadalupe the truth about her daughter.

Ana Luisa poisons Lisandro's heart some more to the point that he agrees to marry her, and they move to New York City to start a new life.

Time passes and Lisandro returns to Monterrey, reencounters Guadalupe, and asks him why he did not want to know anything about the girl, and they discover that it was all a plan by Ana Luisa and Begoña to separate them. The two reconcile and form a beautiful family, but he dies in a plane crash soon after. Guadalupe goes crazy and is admitted to a psychiatric hospital. It is there that she meets her true love, Víctor Manuel.

Ana Luisa changes her name to Sandra Bracho and murders Diana, the director of the mental institution where Guadalupe was treated; Luis Diego; and Gonzalo, her accomplice. Guadalupe is framed in the death of Diana and imprisoned (exculpatory evidence eventually gets her released).

However, seeing that the police are after her, she seeks help from Alina, Lisandro's mother. Ana Luisa tries to steal Alina's jewelry, but Alina shoots her and leaves her seriously injured. In the hospital, knowing that she will go to prison, Ana Luisa takes off her artificial respirator, causing her own death.

In the end, Estrellita asks her mother to please not abandon her, to which Guadalupe reacts and realizes that in her entire life she never decided anything for herself. For this reason, she asks Víctor Manuel for time, to be able to enjoy her daughter and her mother. A little sad, Víctor Manuel accepts.

== Cast ==
- Laura Flores as Guadalupe Roldán Palacios
- Arturo Peniche as Lisandro del Álamo
- Celia Cruz as Macaria
- Lorena Rojas as Ana Luisa Roldán/Sandra Bracho
- Claudia Islas as Begoña Vda. de Roldán
- Carlos Cámara as Humberto Roldán
- Patricia Navidad as Sara "Sarita" Roldán Palacios
- Ofelia Guilmáin as Alina Vda. de Del Álamo
- Rafael Rojas as Luis Diego Morales
- Aracely Arámbula as Maiguálida Roldán Palacios
- Kuno Becker as Juan José
- Ernesto D'Alessio as Papalote
- Osvaldo Sabatini as Víctor Manuel Legarreta
- Serrana as Mónica Rivero
- Erika Buenfil as Diana Alcántara
- Zayda Aullet as Estrella "Estrellita" del Álamo Roldán
- Zulema Cruz as La Tatuada
- Karla Ezquerra as Fefa
- Jesús Ferca as Gonzalo
- Gabriela Goldsmith as Zafiro
- Renata Flores as Celadora Justina
- Diana Laura as Daisy
- Eduardo Luna as Rodrigo
- Xavier Marc as Román
- Marina Marín as Director of the women's prison
- Beatriz Monroy as Doña Queca
- Rigo Palma as Gonzalo
- Maribel Palmer as Isadora
- Ligia Robles as Mirna
- Christian Rubí as Alejandra
- Blanca Torres as Arcelia
- Esmeralda Salinas as Ashanty
- Teresa Tuccio as Martha Karina
- Guillermo Zarur as Don Fulgencio
- Cinthia Moreno Castro as Estrella "Estrellita" del Álamo y Roldán (baby)
- Cristian Solís as Natasha
- Rolando Brito
- Perla Jasso

== Awards ==
| Year | Award | Category | Nominee | Result |
|---|---|---|---|---|
| 1998 | 16th TVyNovelas Awards | Best Musical Theme | El alma no tiene color Laura Flores & Marco Antonio Solís | Won |

== See also ==
- List of telenovelas of Televisa
