= Huracán Ramírez (character) =

Huracán Ramírez (English: "Hurricane Ramírez") is a fictitious character, originally invented for the 1953 Mexican luchador film of the same name. After the movie opened in theaters, Huracán Ramírez also became a professional wrestling character in the ring, primarily played by luchador Eduardo Bonada, who was soon after replaced in the mid-1950s by wrestler Daniel García who wrestled under that name for more than thirty years. The rights to the name and image of Huracán Ramírez were never owned by García, which has led to a number of other wrestlers using the name "Huracán Ramírez" after García retired in 1988, or variations on the theme such as Huracán Ramírez II, Huracán Ramírez Jr., El Hijo de Huracán Ramírez ("Son of Huracán Ramírez") and so on, but all of whom had no actual family relationship to Daniel García.

== Movie character ==
Huracán Ramírez was originally just the title character of a 1953 Mexican film called Huracán Ramírez that starred actor David Silva as a masked professional wrestler (or luchador enmascarado) character. In the film, a young Mexican, whose father is an aging professional wrestler, decides to follow in his father's footsteps by adopting the secret identity of "Huracán Ramírez", a masked luchador, and he fights in the ring in spite of his father's wishes to the contrary. While Silva played the part of Huracan's unmasked alter ego Fernando Torres, the wrestling sequences were performed by an actual luchador named Eduardo Bonada, who then went on for a few years to play the role in the ring. In the mid-1950s, Bonada tired of the role, preferring not to cover his face with a mask, and quit the gig, at which time he was replaced by the film's producers with another wrestler named Daniel García, who played the role in the ring for about 30 years, until he retired in 1988.

The Huracán Ramírez name came from combining a natural disaster with a strong Spanish last name to appeal to the Mexican crowd. Initially he was named "Huracán López", but it was later changed to Huracán Ramírez to avoid confusion with Tarzán López, one of the top Mexican luchadors at the time.

A sequel, El misterio de Huracán Ramírez ("The Mystery of Hurricane Ramirez") came out in 1962 and again Silva reprised his role, but the wrestling sequences this time were all played by the new Huracán, Daniel García, who had played the character in the ring ever since Bonada had quit the gig. Silva played the unmasked Huracán in the first four films, to be replaced by actor Pepe Romay in the last few films. Bonada and García's faces were never shown in any of the films they appeared in, as they only played the masked scenes in the films.

The Huracán character is the property of filmmaker Juan Rodríguez Mas and his father, José Rodríguez (the director of the first Huracán film), who allowed first Eduardo Bonada, and later Daniel García, to play the character in the ring up until each man retired. In 1989, following García's retirement from the ring, Rodríguez wanted to give the mask and character to a new younger wrestler, tying the transfer in with a new Huracán Ramírez movie he was promoting. García resented the idea that someone else would cash in on the popularity he gained while wrestling. In 1988, after the producers went back on an agreement to share the profits from a then-flourishing Huracan comic book with García, he unmasked on television and at several fan events, ensuring that the character would be forever be linked with Garcia himself. The Huracán Ramírez film, Huracán Ramírez contra los Terroristas ("Hurricane Ramírez vs. the Terrorists"), was released in 1989 but did not do well.

=== Filmography ===
A total of nine "Huracán Ramírez" movies were made in all, with the seventh, eighth and ninth films being more or less unrelated. Unlike the Santo movies, these films tended to focus more on dramatic subplots and musical numbers, and never really gave the Huracán Ramírez character a lot to do in the films from an action standpoint. Eduardo Bonada played Huracan in the first movie only, then Daniel García played the part of Huracan in the next five movies from 1962 to 1974. García's last real appearance was De sangre chicana (1974), although he continued to wrestle as Huracán in the ring until 1988. García said that he did not wear the mask for the later "Torito" movies (in 1979 and 1982 respectively), which featured a wrestler called Torito (and only featured very brief scenes of Huracán), nor did he appear in the 1989 movie.

In 2007, a character called "Huracán Ramírez Jr." appeared in the film Mil Mascaras vs. the Aztec Mummy (also known as Mil Mascaras: Resurrection). The person playing Huracán Jr. was not related to any of the wrestlers who played Huracán Ramírez in the original movies.

Year	Title	Portrayer of Huracán Ramírez (masked action scenes)
1953	Huracán Ramírez ("Hurricane Ramírez")	Eduardo Bonada
1962	El misterio de Huracán Ramírez ("The Mystery of Hurricane Ramírez")	Daniel García
1965	El hijo de Huracán Ramírez ("The Son of Hurricane Ramírez")	Daniel García
1969	La venganza de Huracán Ramírez ("The Revenge of Hurricane Ramírez")	Daniel García
1973	Huracán Ramírez y la monjita negra ("Hurricane Ramírez and the Black Nun")	Daniel García
1974	De sangre chicana ("Of Chicano Blood")	Daniel García
1979	Torito Puños de Oro ("The Little Bull with the Golden Fists")	Unknown
1982	Torito De Tepito ("The Little Bull from Tepito")	Unknown
1989	Huracán Ramírez contra los Terroristas ("Hurricane Ramírez vs. the Terrorists")	Unknown
2007	Mil Mascaras vs. the Aztec Mummy	Huracán Ramírez Jr.

== Wrestling character ==
The original "Huracán Ramírez", Eduardo Bonada, adopted the mask and ring name as an actual professional wrestler after he played the masked wrestling scenes in the original 1953 film, with the approval of the film's director José Rodríguez, who agreed that a "real life Huracán Ramírez" would be a good way to ensure the success of his movie. Bonada did not enjoy wrestling under a mask, as it hid his good looks and prevented his recognizability. At one point he spitefully unmasked in public and revealed that he had been playing "Huracán Ramírez" in the ring, but was now moving on to other projects.

After Bonada gave up the character in the mid-1950s, a number of wrestlers started wrestling as "Huracán Ramírez" all over Mexico, but the local boxing and wrestling commissions who regulate professional wrestling in Mexico objected to the deception. The movie's producers held a tryout to see who would be the "one true" Huracán Ramírez in the wrestling world. They chose Daniel García to play the part, but never publicly revealed who had taken over the mask both in their ensuing films as well as in the ring. Later in the year García made his official Mexico City debut in a match against El Medico Asesino. Taking over the gig from Bonada, García wrestled as "Huracán Ramírez" for more than thirty years, becoming one of the most popular wrestlers in Mexico as well as in other Spanish-speaking countries such as Bolivia and Ecuador.

In the mid-1980s, García wanted to ensure that the "Huracán Ramírez" character was passed on to another generation, much in the same tradition of Santo passing his name on to El Hijo del Santo and Blue Demon's legacy being continued by Blue Demon Jr. This desire, and issues over sharing the profits from the "Huracán Ramírez" comic book and merchandising led to a falling out between García and Rodríguez Mas. Mas also threatened to take the "Ramírez" character away from García altogether.

Following the threat, García voluntarily unmasked on national television, ensuring that everyone knew who the true "Huracán" had been for the past 30 years. The move did prevent any subsequent wrestlers working as "Huracán Ramírez" from gaining anywhere near Garcia's popularity. In subsequent years, several wrestlers have however used similar ring names such as Huracán Ramírez II, Huracán Ramírez Jr., El Hijo de Huracán Ramírez and variations thereof, (or names inspired by Ramírez such as "Ciclón Ramírez").

== Huracán Ramírez in popular culture ==
The "Huracán Ramírez" character has been used or included in a number of different non-Lucha Libre contexts. Replicas of his mask has been for sale through a number venues, including such non-wrestling venues as Amazon.com and Halloween stores. The distinctive blue and white mask has also been included as an option in the Create a Wrestler (CAW) option of a number of pro wrestling video games such as WWE SmackDown vs. Raw 2009.
