= EMLL 27th Anniversary Show =

Mexican Professional wrestling show

- Promotion: Empresa Mexicana de Lucha Libre
- Date: September 23, 1960
- City: Mexico City, Mexico
- Venue: Arena México
- Attendance: 13,000

EMLL Anniversary Show chronology
← Previous; 26th Anniversary	Next → 28th Anniversary

The EMLL 27th Anniversary Show (Spanish: 27. Aniversario de EMLL) was a professional wrestling major show event produced by Empresa Mexicana de Lucha Libre (EMLL) that took place on September 23, 1960, in Arena México, Mexico City, Mexico. The event commemorated the 27th anniversary of EMLL, which would become the oldest professional wrestling promotion in the world. The Anniversary show is EMLL's biggest show of the year, their Super Bowl event. The EMLL Anniversary Show series is the longest-running annual professional wrestling show, starting in 1934.

== Production ==
=== Background ===
The 1960 Anniversary show commemorated the 27th anniversary of the Mexican professional wrestling company Empresa Mexicana de Lucha Libre (Spanish for "Mexican Wrestling Promotion"; EMLL) holding their first show on September 22, 1933 by promoter and founder Salvador Lutteroth. EMLL was rebranded early in 1992 to become Consejo Mundial de Lucha Libre ("World Wrestling Council"; CMLL) signal their departure from the National Wrestling Alliance. With the sales of the Jim Crockett Promotions to Ted Turner in 1988 EMLL became the oldest, still-operating wrestling promotion in the world. Over the years EMLL/CMLL has on occasion held multiple shows to celebrate their anniversary but since 1977 the company has only held one annual show, which is considered the biggest show of the year, CMLL's equivalent of WWE's WrestleMania or their Super Bowl event. CMLL has held their Anniversary show at Arena México in Mexico City, Mexico since 1956, the year the building was completed, over time Arena México earned the nickname "The Cathedral of Lucha Libre" due to it hosting most of EMLL/CMLL's major events since the building was completed. Traditionally EMLL/CMLL holds their major events on Friday Nights, replacing their regularly scheduled Super Viernes show.

=== Storylines ===
The event featured an undetermined number of professional wrestling matches with different wrestlers involved in pre-existing scripted feuds, plots and storylines. Wrestlers were portrayed as either heels (referred to as rudos in Mexico, those that portray the "bad guys") or faces (técnicos in Mexico, the "good guy" characters) as they followed a series of tension-building events, which culminated in a wrestling match or series of matches. Due to the nature of keeping mainly paper records of wrestling at the time no documentation has been found for some of the matches of the show.

== Event ==
Espectro I was forced to retire a year prior at the EMLL 26th Anniversary Show due to a neck injury. At the time he held the Mexican National Light Heavyweight Championship, which was vacated after Espectro I's retirement. EMLL held a tournament from May 15th to May 29th 1960, with Ruben Juarez beating El Enfermero in the finals of the tournament. His first defence against Ray Mendoza was the only verified match on the 27th Anniversary Show, having initially been mistaken in the records for the final of the tournament.

=== Results ===
No.	Results	Stipulations
1	Ruben Juarez (c) defeated Ray Mendoza	Singles Match for the Mexican National Light Heavyweight Championship
2	Gori Guerrero (c) defeated Sugi Sito	Singles Match for the NWA World Light Heavyweight Championship
3	Rene Guajardo defeated Rolando Vera	Singles Match for the NWA World Middleweight Championship
(c) / – the champion(s) heading into the match
