= De sangre chicana =

1974 film by Joselito Rodríguez

- Directed by: Joselito Rodríguez
- Written by: Ramón Obón; Joselito Rodríguez; Adolfo Torres Portillo
- Produced by: Joselito Rodríguez
- Starring: Pepe Romay; José Chávez Trowe; Elizabeth Dupeyrón; Mario Balandra; Coloso Colosetti
- Cinematography: Xavier Cruz
- Edited by: Raúl J. Casso
- Music by: Sergio Guerrero
- Distributed by: Cinematográfica Roma
- Release date: 5 September 1974 (Mexico)
- Running time: 93 minutes
- Country: Mexico
- Languages: Spanish; English

De sangre chicana (in English, "Of Chicano Blood") is a 1974 Mexican lucha libre crime drama film written and directed by Joselito Rodríguez, and starring Pepe Romay, José Chávez Trowe and Elizabeth Dupeyrón. The film concerns a father and his three children who live in the United States close to the Mexico–United States border, as they, who are Mexicans, try to adapt to local customs, while one of them wrestles as masked professional wrestler Huracán Ramírez. It is the final theatrical film in a series of films centered on the Huracán Ramírez character, which began with Huracán Ramírez (1952).

== Cast ==
- Pepe Romay as Raúl Martínez
- José Chávez Trowe as Refugio Martínez
- Elizabeth Dupeyrón as María Martínez/Mary Martin
- Mario Balandra as Juan Martínez
- Susana Cabrera as Susana
- Aída Araceli as Mauro's wife
- Coloso Colosetti as Golden Bull
- Armando Acosta as Mauro Campos
- Marcelo Villamil as Tom
- Juan Garza as "Yaqui" Garza
- Efraín Gutiérrez
- Huracán Ramírez as himself on wrestling scenes

== Production ==
The film is part of a series of wrestling films centered around the fictitious Huracán Ramírez character, created by director Joselito Rodríguez and his son Juan Rodríguez Más, that began with Huracán Ramírez (1952). Although originally the films featured actor David Silva as Fernando Torres, the character who in-story dons the Huracán Ramírez mask, neither Silva nor his character appeared either on this film or the previous Huracán Ramírez film, Huracán Ramírez y la monjita negra.

The film was shot on location in San Antonio, with David E. Wilt of The Mexican Film Bulletin reporting that some interiors were filmed at the Estudios América as well.

== Reception ==
Several reviews noted that despite its title, the protagonists' condition as Chicanos was ultimately little addressed, with David E. Wilt in The Mexican Film Bulletin stating that "there isn't a lot of talk about racism or discrimination." The book ¡Quiero ver sangre!: Historia ilustrada del cine de luchadores said of the film, "The 'Chicano' condition of the protagonists is little addressed. The mentioned takes of the border remain in fairground fights."

David Maciel in El Norte: The U.S.-Mexican Border in Contemporary Cinema said, "It is obvious the plot has little or no relation to reality even in the most elementary sense. The exaggerated stereotypes of the main characters are highly improbable and the plot has little to do with the most basic social issues affecting the present-day Chicano. The importance of De Sangre Chicana is that the subplots developed and the caricatures represented in the story are reflective of past general Mexican attitudes towards Chicanos. The film conveys much more about Mexican stereotypes of Chicanos than about the contemporary Chicano reality." Maciel was surprised "that despite press coverage of the Chicano social struggle and its leaders received, no other Mexican films" besides this film and 1974's Chicano "focused solely on the Chicano struggle of the late 1960s and 1970s. Mexican cinema almost totally ignored a major social movement that took place largely in the Southwest of the United States and touched its own northern border."

Charles M. Tatum in Chicano popular culture described the film as one of the films made by the Mexican film industry about the border, but that they "seem designed to appeal to the emotions of a mass audience and generally avoid serious consideration of the complexity of border problems and issues."

Wilt ultimately stated that from a production standpoint, "the acting and production values of De sangre chicana are fine", saying that the direction "doesn't try anything fancy, but [the] work is satisfactory. […] The San Antonio locations are effective. Overall, a fairly decent piece of work."

== Bibliography ==
- Wilt, David E. (December 2006). "The Mexican Film Bulletin" (PDF). 12 (8).
