= EMLL 24th Anniversary Show =

Mexican Professional wrestling show

- Promotion: Empresa Mexicana de Lucha Libre
- Date: September 20, 1957
- City: Mexico City, Mexico
- Venue: Arena México

EMLL Anniversary Show chronology
← Previous; 23rd Anniversary	Next → 25th Anniversary

The EMLL 24th Anniversary Show (Spanish: 24. Aniversario de EMLL) was a professional wrestling major show event produced by Empresa Mexicana de Lucha Libre (EMLL) that took place on September 20, 1957, in Arena México, Mexico City, Mexico. The event commemorated the 24th anniversary of EMLL, which became the oldest professional wrestling promotion in the world. The Anniversary show is EMLL's biggest show of the year. The EMLL Anniversary Show series is the longest-running annual professional wrestling show, starting in 1934.

== Production ==
=== Background ===
The 1957 Anniversary show commemorated the 24th anniversary of the Mexican professional wrestling company Empresa Mexicana de Lucha Libre (Spanish for "Mexican Wrestling Promotion"; EMLL) holding their first show on September 22, 1933 by promoter and founder Salvador Lutteroth. EMLL was rebranded early in 1992 to become Consejo Mundial de Lucha Libre ("World Wrestling Council"; CMLL) signal their departure from the National Wrestling Alliance. With the sales of the Jim Crockett Promotions to Ted Turner in 1988 EMLL became the oldest, still-operating wrestling promotion in the world. Over the years EMLL/CMLL has on occasion held multiple shows to celebrate their anniversary but since 1977 the company has only held one annual show, which is considered the biggest show of the year, CMLL's equivalent of WWE's WrestleMania or their Super Bowl event. CMLL has held their Anniversary show at Arena México in Mexico City, Mexico since 1956, the year the building was completed, over time Arena México earned the nickname "The Cathedral of Lucha Libre" due to it hosting most of EMLL/CMLL's major events since the building was completed. Traditionally EMLL/CMLL holds their major events on Friday Nights, replacing their regularly scheduled Super Viernes show.

=== Storylines ===
The event featured an undetermined number of professional wrestling matches with different wrestlers involved in pre-existing scripted feuds, plots and storylines. Wrestlers were portrayed as either heels (referred to as rudos in Mexico, those that portray the "bad guys") or faces (técnicos in Mexico, the "good guy" characters) as they followed a series of tension-building events, which culminated in a wrestling match or series of matches. Due to the nature of keeping mainly paper records of wrestling at the time no documentation has been found for some of the matches of the show.

== Event ==
The only confirmed match on the show was the finals of a tag team where the winning team would win $10,000 in cash. The tournament may have been held exclusively on the 24th Anniversary Show or the preliminary rounds held in the weeks leading up to the show. The final of the tournament saw the team of Black Shadow and Alex Romano emerge as the winners. The tournament also included the following teams:

- Ray Mendoza and Colin Galin
- Enrique Llanes and Tarzán López
- Canelo Segura and Karloff Lagarde
- Carlos Moreno and Jorge Allende
- Dory Dixon and Ray Plata
- Chico Casasola and Frankestain
- Sugi Sito and Manuel Robles

== Results ==
No.	Results	Stipulations
1	Black Shadow and Alex Romano won the tournament	Finals of a torneo relampago 10,000 peso tag team tournament
