= EMLL 25th Anniversary Show =

Mexican Professional wrestling show

- Official poster for the event
- Promotion: Empresa Mexicana de Lucha Libre
- Date: September 26, 1958
- City: Mexico City, Mexico
- Venue: Arena México
- Attendance: Unknown

EMLL Anniversary Show chronology
← Previous; 24th Anniversary	Next → 26th Anniversary

The EMLL 25th Anniversary Show (Spanish: 25. Aniversario de EMLL) was a professional wrestling major show event produced by Empresa Mexicana de Lucha Libre (EMLL) that took place on September 26, 1958 in Arena México, Mexico City, Mexico. The event commemorated the 25th anniversary of EMLL, which would become the oldest professional wrestling promotion in the world. The Anniversary show is EMLL's biggest show of the year. The EMLL Anniversary Show series is the longest-running annual professional wrestling show, starting in 1934.

== Production ==
=== Background ===
The 1958 Anniversary show commemorated the 25th anniversary of the Mexican professional wrestling company Empresa Mexicana de Lucha Libre (Spanish for "Mexican Wrestling Promotion"; EMLL) holding their first show on September 22, 1933 by promoter and founder Salvador Lutteroth. EMLL was rebranded early in 1992 to become Consejo Mundial de Lucha Libre ("World Wrestling Council"; CMLL) signal their departure from the National Wrestling Alliance. With the sales of the Jim Crockett Promotions to Ted Turner in 1988 EMLL became the oldest, still-operating wrestling promotion in the world. Over the years EMLL/CMLL has on occasion held multiple shows to celebrate their anniversary but since 1977 the company has only held one annual show, which is considered the biggest show of the year, CMLL's equivalent of WWE's WrestleMania or their Super Bowl event. CMLL has held their Anniversary show at Arena México in Mexico City, Mexico since 1956, the year the building was completed, over time Arena México earned the nickname "The Cathedral of Lucha Libre" due to it hosting most of EMLL/CMLL's major events since the building was completed. Traditionally EMLL/CMLL holds their major events on Friday Nights, replacing their regularly scheduled Super Viernes show.

=== Storylines ===
The EMLL 25th Anniversary Show featured seven professional wrestling matches with different wrestlers involved in pre-existing scripted feuds, plots and storylines. Wrestlers were portrayed as either heels (referred to as rudos in Mexico, those that portray the "bad guys") or faces (técnicos in Mexico, the "good guy" characters) as they followed a series of tension-building events, which culminated in a wrestling match or series of matches. Due to the nature of keeping mainly paper records of wrestling at the time not all match results have been confirmed.

== Event ==
In the first of only two documented matches the masked Espectro I ("Spectre") and Torbellino Blanco ("White Whirlwind") both put their masks on the line in a Lucha de Apuesta match. The Apuesta match is considered the ultimate "issue settler" and the most prestigious match type in Lucha Libre. In this case the rudo Espectro I defeated Spanish born Torbellino Blanco, forcing him to remove his mask and reveal his birth name; Mariano Yugueros. In the only other confirmed match Rolando Vera successfully defended the NWA World Middleweight Championship against Black Shadow in a best two-out-of three falls match, winning the second and third falls.

=== Results ===
No.	Results	Stipulations
1	El Verdugo defeated Giuliano	Singles match
2	Sordomudo Rodríguez defeated Manuel Robles	Singles match
3	El Enfermero defeated Alex Romano	Singles match
4	Dory Dixon defeated Rene Guajardo by DQ	Singles match
5	Karloff Lagarde defeated Bobby Bonales	Singles match
6	Espectro I defeated Torbellino Blanco	Best two-out-of-three falls Lucha de Apuesta mask vs. mask match
7	Rolando Vera (c) defeated Black Shadow	Best two-out-of-three falls match for the NWA World Middleweight Championship
(c) / – the champion(s) heading into the match
