= The Lovers (1951 film) =

1951 film

- Directed by: Fernando A. Rivero
- Written by: José G. Cruz; Fernando A. Rivero
- Produced by: Guillermo Calderón; Pedro A. Calderón
- Starring: Emilia Guiú; David Silva; Luis Aldás
- Cinematography: Enrique Wallace
- Edited by: Alfredo Rosas Priego
- Music by: Antonio Díaz Conde
- Production company: Producciones Calderón
- Release date: 11 July 1951
- Running time: 84 minutes
- Country: Mexico
- Language: Spanish

The Lovers (Spanish: Los amantes) is a 1951 Mexican crime drama film directed by Fernando A. Rivero and starring Emilia Guiú, David Silva and Luis Aldás. It was shot at the Churubusco Studios in Mexico City. The film's sets were designed by the art director Manuel Fontanals.

== Cast ==
- Emilia Guiú as Yolanda
- David Silva as Jorge Rubio
- Luis Aldás as Bruno del Moral
- Rodolfo Acosta as Alejandro / Alex Montez
- Angélica María as Gloria
- Gloria Jordán as Olga
- Mireya Gutiérrez
- Guillermo Bravo Sosa as Gerente hotel
- Salvador Quiroz as Licenciado
- Mario Bretón
- Rogelio Fernández as Complice de Alex
- Kitty Alatriste
- Alfonso Carti as Policía
- Fernando Galiana as Raúl, novio de Gloria
- Gloria Mestre as Beatriz, sirvienta
- Lina Otero as Gloria, adulta
- Ignacio Peón as Cliente cabaret
- Ángela Rodríguez as Clienta cabaret
- Luis G. Roldán as Roberto - cantante
- Acela Vidaurri as Lucha, adulta (Hija de Bruno)
- Anita Vázquez as Bailarina

== Bibliography ==
- Rosa Peralta Gilabert. Manuel Fontanals, escenógrafo: teatro, cine y exilio. Editorial Fundamentos, 2007.
