= EMLL 23rd Anniversary Show =

Mexican Professional wrestling show

- Promotion: Empresa Mexicana de Lucha Libre
- Date: September 21, 1956
- City: Mexico City, Mexico
- Venue: Arena México
- Attendance: 17,678

Pay-per-view chronology
| ← Previous; Juicio Final | Next → 24th Anniversary |

EMLL Anniversary Show chronology
| ← Previous; 22nd Anniversary | Next → 24th Anniversary |

The EMLL 23rd Anniversary Show (Spanish: 23. Aniversario de EMLL) was a professional wrestling major show event produced by Empresa Mexicana de Lucha Libre (EMLL) that took place on September 21, 1956, in Arena México, Mexico City, Mexico. The event commemorated the 23rd anniversary of EMLL, which would become the oldest professional wrestling promotion in the world. The Anniversary show is EMLL's biggest show of the year. The show was the first Anniversary show to take place in the recently built Arena México, having only opened to the public in April 1956. The EMLL Anniversary Show series is the longest-running annual professional wrestling show, starting in 1934.

== Production ==
=== Background ===
The 1956 Anniversary show commemorated the 23rd anniversary of the Mexican professional wrestling company Empresa Mexicana de Lucha Libre (Spanish for "Mexican Wrestling Promotion"; EMLL) holding their first show on September 22, 1933 by promoter and founder Salvador Lutteroth. EMLL was rebranded early in 1992 to become Consejo Mundial de Lucha Libre ("World Wrestling Council"; CMLL) signal their departure from the National Wrestling Alliance. With the sales of the Jim Crockett Promotions to Ted Turner in 1988 EMLL became the oldest, still-operating wrestling promotion in the world. Over the years EMLL/CMLL has on occasion held multiple shows to celebrate their anniversary but since 1977 the company has only held one annual show, which is considered the biggest show of the year, CMLL's equivalent of WWE's WrestleMania or their Super Bowl event. CMLL has held their Anniversary show at Arena México in Mexico City, Mexico since 1956, the year the building was completed, over time Arena México earned the nickname "The Cathedral of Lucha Libre" due to it hosting most of EMLL/CMLL's major events since the building was completed. Traditionally EMLL/CMLL holds their major events on Friday Nights, replacing their regularly scheduled Super Viernes show.

=== Storylines ===
The event featured an undetermined number of professional wrestling matches with different wrestlers involved in pre-existing scripted feuds, plots and storylines. Wrestlers were portrayed as either heels (referred to as rudos in Mexico, those that portray the "bad guys") or faces (técnicos in Mexico, the "good guy" characters) as they followed a series of tension-building events, which culminated in a wrestling match or series of matches. Due to the nature of keeping mainly paper records of wrestling at the time no documentation has been found for some of the matches of the show.

== Event ==
The 23rd Anniversary Show was the first to take place in the newly constructed Arena México, EMLL's new main venue. The event drew a crowd of 17,678 spectators in total. The headliner of the event was a best two-out-of-three falls Lucha de Apuesta mask vs. mask match, the most important and prestigious match type in Lucha Libre. For this match two of the top masked wrestlers in Mexico faced off as the golden masked El Gladiador took on the silver masked El Santo, in a bout set up by Santo beating Gladiador the previous week in a tournament final for the Mexican National Middleweight Championship. In the end El Santo further cemented his iconic status as he defeated El Gladiador. Following the match El Gladiador removed his golden mask and revealed that his real name was Luis Ramirez Romero. He became the first of many wrestlers to lose their mask in the building referred to as the "Wrestling Cathedral of Mexico".

== Results ==
| No. | Results | Stipulations |
|---|---|---|
| 1 | El Santo defeated El Gladiador | Best two-out-of-three falls Lucha de Apuesta mask vs. mask match |
