= Occidente Heavyweight Championship =

Professional wrestling championship

Details
- Promotion: CMLL Guadalajara
- Current champion: Bestia Negra
- Date won: March 1, 2023

Other names
- Western Heavyweight Championship; CMLL Western Heavyweight Championship; CMLL Guadalajara Heavyweight Championship
Statistics
- First champion: El Bulldog
- Most reigns: El Bulldog (2 times)
- Longest reign: Diamante Azul (1,500 days)
- Shortest reign: Polo Torres (42 days)

The Occidente Heavyweight Championship (called the Campeonato de Peso Completo de Occidente in Spanish) is a Mexican professional wrestling championship created by Consejo Mundial de Lucha Libre's (CMLL) Guadalajara branch. The term Occidente refers to the western part of Mexico, specifically the state of Jalisco. sanctioned by Comisión de Box y Lucha Libre Guadalajara ("the Guadalajara Boxing and Wrestling Commission" in Spanish). Although the Commission sanctions the title, it does not promote the events in which the title is defended. The current champion is Bestia Negra, who is in his first reign. He won the title by defeating Exterminador 2–1 in a two-out-of-three falls match on Martes de Glamour in Guadalajara, Jalisco, on March 1, 2023.

While Diamante Azul is the longest reigning champion, at 4,622 days, the title has been inactive for long periods of time when Diamante Azul lived in France.

The championship is designated as a heavyweight title, which means that the Championship can officially only be competed for by wrestlers weighing at least 105 kg (231 lb). In the 20th century Mexican wrestling enforced the weight divisions more strictly, but in the 21st century the rules were occasionally ignored for the various weight divisions. One example was Diamante holding the championship while officially being billed as weighing 99 kg (218 lb), well below the weight limit. While the Heavyweight title is traditionally considered the most prestigious weight division in professional wrestling, CMLL places more emphasis on the lower weight divisions. As such, the CMLL World Heavyweight Title is not considered the top CMLL Championship. As it is a professional wrestling championship, it is not won through legitimate competition; it is instead won via a scripted ending to a match.

== Title history ==
Key
No.	Overall reign number
Reign	Reign number for the specific champion
Days	Number of days held
N/A	Unknown information
+	Current reign is changing daily

No.	Champion	Championship change			Reign statistics		Notes	Ref.
No.	Champion	Date	Event	Location	Reign	Days	Notes	Ref.
Consejo Mundial de Lucha Libre (CMLL)
Championship history is unrecorded from 1950s to 1950s.
1	El Bulldog	N/A	Live event	Guadalajara, Jalisco, Mexico	1	(Note: The exact date El Bulldog won the championship has not been verified, making the length of the reign too uncertain to calculate.)		
2	Polo Torres	September 5, 1954	Live event	Guadalajara, Jalisco, Mexico	1	42		
3	El Bulldog	June 20, 1954	CMLL Guadalajara Domingos	Guadalajara, Jalisco, Mexico	2	182		
4	Lotario	December 19, 1954	N/A	Guadalajara, Jalisco, Mexico	1	231		
5	Médico Asesino	August 7, 1955	Live event	Guadalajara, Jalisco, Mexico	1			
—	Vacated	N/A	—	—	—	—	Championship was vacated when Médico Asesino won the Mexican National Heavyweight Championship	
Championship history is unrecorded from 1955 to 1970s.
6	Monje Loco	N/A	Live event	Guadalajara, Jalisco, Mexico	1	(Note: The exact date Monje Loco won the championship has not been verified, making the length of the reign too uncertain to calculate.)	Unclear if Monje Loco won a tournament or someone else lost the championship to Monje Loco.	
Championship history is unrecorded from 1970s to May 9, 2004.
7	Sheriff	May 9, 2004	Live event	Guadalajara, Jalisco, Mexico	1	(Note: The exact date Sheriff vacated the championship has not been verified making the length of the reign too uncertain to calculate.)	Defeated Leon Blanco for the title.	
—	Vacated	July 2008	—	—	—	—	Sheriff changed his ring character to Cien Caras Jr. in 2005 and started working in other parts of Mexico. The championship was inactive until vacated at some point in June 2008 or possibly earlier.	
8	Diamante	July 20, 2012	CMLL Guadalajara Viernes	Guadalajara, Jalisco, Mexico	1	60	Defeated Misterioso II in a tournament final for the vacant title.	
9	Olímpico	September 18, 2012	CMLL Guadalajara TV	Guadalajara, Jalisco, Mexico	1	502		
10	Diamante Azul	February 2, 2014	CMLL Guadalajara Domingos	Guadalajara, Jalisco, Mexico	1	1,500		
11	Furia Roja	March 13, 2018	CMLL Guadalajara Domingos	Guadalajara, Jalisco, Mexico	1	229		
12	Star Black	October 28, 2018	CMLL Guadalajara Domingos	Guadalajara, Jalisco, Mexico	1	2,893		
—	Vacated	October 20, 2019	CMLL Guadalajara Domingos	Guadalajara, Jalisco, Mexico	—	—	Star Black vacated the title due to an injury.	
13	Exterminador	October 20, 2019	CMLL Guadalajara Domingos	Guadalajara, Jalisco, Mexico	1	2,536		
14	Bestia Negra	March 1, 2022	Martes de Glamour	Guadalajara, Jalisco, Mexico	1	1,673+		

== Tournaments ==
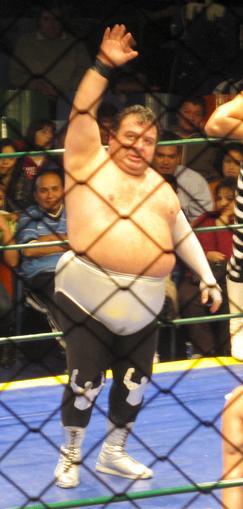
Brazo de Plata, who was one of ten men competing for the vacant championship

=== 2012 ===
The Occidente Heavyweight Championship was officially declared vacant in June, 2008. The title had in effect been inactive since former champion Sheriff had begun working under the enmascarado (masked) character Cien Caras Jr. in 2005, with no reference being made to his former ring character. CMLL decided to hold a 10-man torneo cibernetico on July 13, 2012 to determine which two professional wrestlers would face off for the title the following week. Diamante and Misterioso Jr. outlasted the remaining field that included Brazo de Plata, Brazo de Oro, Rey Escorpión, Espectrum, El Hijo del Fantasma, Ráfaga, León Blanco and Gran Kenut. On July 20 Diamante defeated Misterioso Jr. becoming the first Occidente Heavyweight Champion in seven years.
