= Huracán Ramírez (film) =

1952 film by Joselito Rodríguez

- Theatrical release poster
- Directed by: Joselito Rodríguez; Américo Fernández (assistant director)
- Written by: Joselito Rodríguez; Juan Rodríguez Mas; Jesús Saucedo
- Starring: David Silva; Tonina Jackson; Titina Romay; Carmelita González; Freddy Fernández; Anabelle Gutiérrez; Yadira Jiménez
- Cinematography: Jack L. Draper
- Edited by: Fernando Martínez
- Music by: Sergio Guerrero
- Distributed by: Películas Rodríguez; Estudios Churubusco Azteca S.A.
- Release date: 1953
- Running time: 103 minutes
- Country: Mexico
- Language: Spanish

Huracán Ramírez (Hurricane Ramirez) is a 1953 black-and-white Mexican luchador film directed by Joselito Rodríguez and co-written by Joselito Rodríguez, Juan Rodríguez Mas, and Jesús Saucedo. The film follows the story of Fernando Torres, a young man who decides to follow in his father's footsteps by donning the secret identity of Huracán Ramírez, a masked professional wrestler, despite his father's wishes to the contrary.

Huracán Ramírez was the first of a series of wrestling films to introduce the fictitious title character. Unlike later films of the genre, its storyline focused on more dramatic subplots and light comedy. Although actor David Silva portrayed the role of Fernando Torres, the wrestling scenes and action sequences were performed by real-life wrestler Eduardo Bonada. Bonada was contracted to wrestle as Huracán Ramírez following the film's release, until he grew tired of the gimmick and was replaced by luchador Daniel García. García, who popularized the character, would continue to wrestle as Huracán Ramírez until his retirement from lucha libre in 1988. The character was originally named 'Huracán López' in the early stages of film production. His surname was later changed to avoid confusion with Tarzán López.

== Plot ==
Fernando Torres, in light of his family's poor finances, drops out of college to become a successful lounge singer at a local club. A fact he keeps secret from his father, a washed-up wrestler under the name of Tonina Jackson. Tonina has had some recent popularity in the ring, only due to Fernando bribing other wrestlers to lose. Fernando is also secretly moonlighting as the masked luchador Huracán Ramírez to further help with the household expenses. He is assisted by his somewhat dim-witted friend, Pichí, who doubles as his trainer and his stand-in for any situation in which Fernando and Huracán might have to be seen at the same time. Tonino has a growing resentment against Huracán's popularity and is further aggravated when he refuses to face him in the ring.

After a night of partying, Fernando's father discovers his secret job as a lounge singer. Unimpressed with his new career path and disappointed he ended his schooling, he demands Fernando to leave his household. Tonina is later dissuaded by his younger daughter, who explains Fernando has been helping with finances for some time and without his spare income, the family would have been unable to survive. Meanwhile, the local wrestling promoter discovers Fernando has been setting up his father's matches. The promoter promises not to expose him as long as further bribes do not occur. In a following match against the wrestler Bello Califa, a drunken Pichí is mistaken for Huracán Ramírez. Pichí manages to defeat the flamboyant Bello Califa and after much confusion, both Fernando's sisters discover the true identity of Huracán.

In the next day's match, Fernando wrestles against El Médico Asesino, only to be interrupted by an angry Tonina. Despite being unwilling to fight against his father, Fernando relents. After their impromptu match comes to an end, Tonina develops a great respect for Huracán Ramírez and decides to form an alliance with him. Meanwhile, Gloria, a fellow lounge singer and Fernando's former flame, feels dejected when her love for Fernando goes on unrequited. She is later enraged to learn that he has a new girlfriend, Laura, Pichí's older sister. A broken-hearted Gloria seeks revenge against her former lover, and after discovering his secret identity of Huracán Ramírez, plots to kill him by enlisting the aid of rival luchadors Frank "El Carnicero" Bucher, El Médico Asesino, Camilo "Bulldog" Pérez.

The plan is to kidnap Fernando's father, who will thereby be unable to attend the night's tag-team match, and be replaced with Bulldog. During the course of the match, Bulldog will turn against Huracán, and the three luchadors will beat him to death. Their plan is foiled however, as Pichí quickly alerts Fernando who arrives just in time as Huracán to free his father, but his leg is badly injured in the process. Tonina leaves for the match, only for Huracán to be replaced last minute by Bulldog, a reversal of Gloria's original plan. Fernando manages to rush to the wrestling stadium in time to fend off his father's attackers, but in his wounded state is easily overpowered by them. In an illegal move, one of the luchadors unmasks Fernando, revealing his true identity to his father. At this, both father and son are put in a blind rage, in which they both are able to defeat their attackers at the thunderous applause of fans.

== Cast ==
- David Silva as Fernando Torres/Huracán Ramírez: A young man who drops out of college and dons a secret identity of a masked wrestler to help with his family's finances. Real-life luchador Eduardo Bonada performed much of Huracán's action sequences.
- Tonina Jackson as Señor Torres/Tonina Jackson: Fernando's father. A washed-up and overweight wrestler who has had a recent comeback. Huracán's refusal to a match only furthers his dislike for him.
- Carmelita González as Laura: A good friend of the Torres family and owner of a local diner. Laura is also Fernando's girlfriend and one of the few to know he is wrestling.
- Freddy Fernández as Pichi: Laura's younger brother and Fernando's best friend. Pichi is the only one besides Laura to know of Fernando's activities as Huracán Ramírez. Pichi also acts as Fernando's trainer and his stand-in.
- Titina Romay as Margarita Torres: Fernando's precocious and bossy eight-year-old little sister. For this role, Titina Romay was nominated for an Ariel Award for best child actress.
- Anabel Gutiérrez as Cata Torres: Fernando's sixteen-year-old sister, who has become infatuated with Huracán Ramírez, despite the affection of Pichi.
- Yadira Jiménez as Gloria: Fernando's former flame, who is secretly plotting revenge against him.

The film also featured real-life luchadores Frank "El Carnicero" Bucher, El Médico Asesino, Camilo "Bulldog" Pérez, and Bello Califa. Daniel García, who would later portray Huracán Ramírez on screen and in the ring, appears in two uncredited roles: as the masked El Buitre Blanco and the unmasked Chico García. García worked as both characters prior to taking up the Huracán Ramírez persona.

== Sequels ==
The film produced many sequels involving Huracán Ramírez. While David Silva would return as Fernando Torres, the wrestler who did the action sequences, Eduardo Bonada, resigned from the role. An audition to find Bonada's successor was held by the Rodríguez family, and it was given to Daniel García. García appeared as Huracán Ramírez in El misterio de Huracán Ramírez (1962), El hijo de Huracán Ramírez (1965), La venganza de Huracán Ramírez (1969), Huracán Ramírez y la monjita negro (1973) and De sangre chicana (1974). Silva stepped down from the role of Fernando Torres after El hijo de Huracán Ramírez, and was replaced by Pepe Romay.

The Huracán Ramírez character had a minor role in the Torito films Torito Puños de Oro (1979) and Torito De Tepito (1982), but García did not reprise the character and it is unknown as to who did. The release of Huracán Ramírez contra los Terroristas (1989), saw a return of the Huracán character. García had retired from the ring the previous year, and so Huracán was portrayed by another unknown wrestler. However, the film sold poorly, leading to the wrestler to quit playing Huracan in the ring soon afterwards. The Huracán Ramírez character also appeared in the Mil Máscaras film Mil Mascaras vs. the Aztec Mummy (2007). He was portrayed by Huracán Ramírez Jr., who is not related to García.
