= El misterio de Huracán Ramírez =

1962 film by Joselito Rodríguez

- Directed by: Joselito Rodríguez
- Written by: Fernando Méndez; Joselito Rodríguez; Juan Rodríguez Mas
- Produced by: Juan Rodríguez Mas (credited as 'Juan R. Mas')
- Starring: David Silva; Totina Jackson; Titina Romay; Pepe Romay; Carmelita González; Freddy Fernández; Carlos Agosti
- Cinematography: Manuel Gómez Urquiza
- Edited by: Carlos Savage
- Music by: Sergio Guerrero
- Distributed by: Cinematográfia Romá; Películas Rodríguez; Estudios Churubusco Azteca S.A.
- Release date: 1962
- Running time: 86 minutes
- Country: Mexico
- Language: Spanish

El misterio de Huracán Ramírez (The Mystery of Hurricane Ramirez) is a 1962 black-and-white Mexican luchador film directed and co-written by Joselito Rodríguez. The film is a sequel to Rodríguez's 1952 film Huracán Ramírez, with David Silva reprising his role as Fernando Torres. Other returning cast members include Tonina Jackson, Carmelita González, Titina Romay and Freddy Fernández. Pepe Romay joins the cast as Fernando's son Pancho, and Daniel García makes his film début as Huracán Ramírez, replacing Spanish-born wrestler Eduardo Bonada, who would make only a cameo appearance.

== Plot ==
The film continues the story of Fernando Torres, now seemingly retired from professional wrestling, having sold his former identity to a rival. The new Huracán has proved himself to be a savvy businessman, running his own wrestling arena. The lives of Huracán and the Torres family are soon threatened however, by a local gangster known as El Príncipe (Carlos Agosti), who will stop at nothing until he discovers the true identity of Huracán Ramírez.

== Cast ==
- David Silva as Fernando Torres: A retired wrestler who sold the Huracán Ramírez wrestling mask and character to someone else.
  - Daniel García was the man under the Huracán Ramírez mask in all of the action sequences. He would also play the role in wrestling rings all over Mexico for decades after the movie was released.
- Tonina Jackson as Señor Torres/Tonina Jackson: Fernando's father
- Carmelita González as Laura: Fernando's wife.
- Freddy Fernández as Pichí: Laura's younger brother and Fernando's best friend.
- Titina Romay as Margarita Torres: Fernando's little sister.

The film also featured a number of real-life luchadores wrestling with and against Huracán Ramírez in the action sequences.
