= Carmelita González =

Mexican actress (1928–2010)

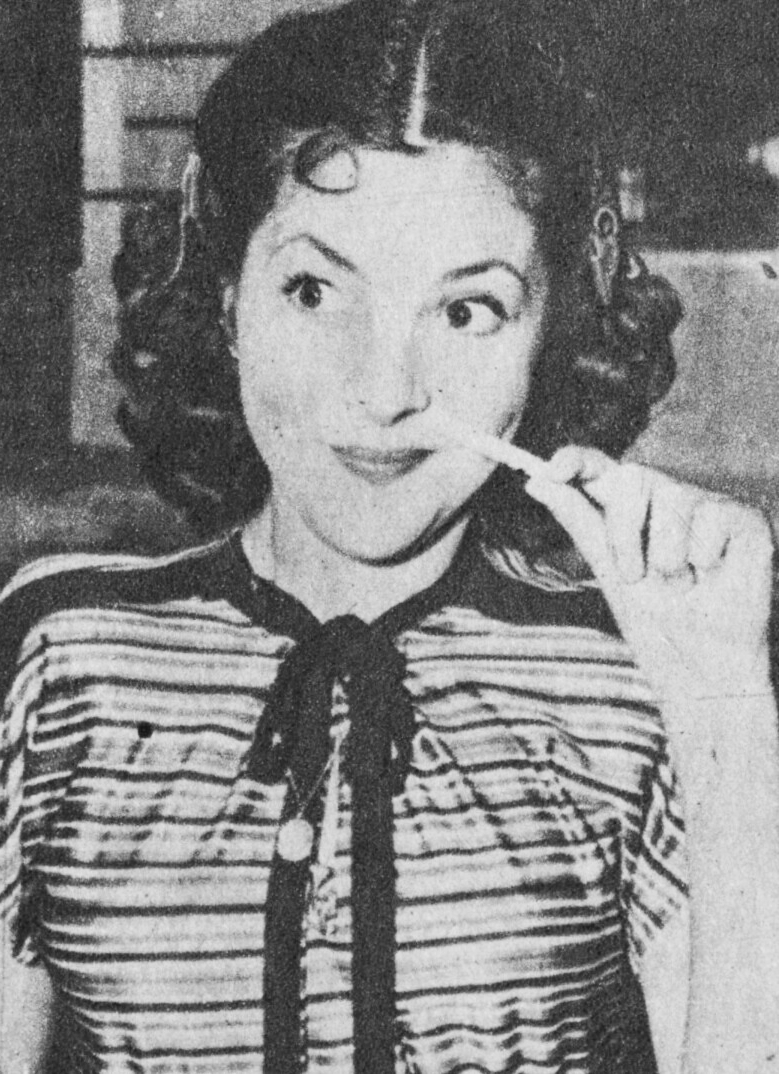
- Carmelita González in 1945
- Born: July 11, 1928; Mexico City
- Died: April 30, 2010 (aged 81); Mexico City, Mexico
- Known for: "Primera actriz" (lead actress) Cinema, telenovela
- Spouse: Eduardo Fajardo
- Awards: Diosa de Plata (Silver Goddess Award), Dos tipos de cuidado (1953); Ariel Award for Best Supporting Actress, Motel (1984)
- Patrons: Luis Aguilar

Carmelita González (July 11, 1928 – April 30, 2010) was a Mexican lead actress known for her film roles during the Golden Age of Mexican cinema. She appeared in nearly 100 Mexican films during her career, opposite such actors as Mario Moreno Cantinflas, Pedro Infante and Jorge Negrete. González began her career by earning $21 but went on to win an Ariel Award for Best Supporting Actress for her 1984 performance in Luis Mandoki's Motel.

== Golden age of Mexican cinema ==
Carmelita González made her debut in 1945 with Camino de Sacramento which starred Negrete. Because she was uncredited, González only earned $21. She earned her first film credit as Carmelita González in 1946 alongside comedian Cantinflas in Soy un prófugo. Active throughout the Golden Age of Mexican cinema, González's film credits included 1952's Dos tipos de cuidado, co-starring Jorge Negrete and Pedro Infante. Her role as Rosario, a rape victim, in Dos tipos de cuidado garnered a Diosa de Plata (Silver Goddess Award) and considered a major performance. González would appear uncredited with Mario Moreno in 1956's Around the World in 80 Days. Her contemporary actresses were Charito Granados, Esther Fernández and Marga López. Appearing during the Golden Age of Mexican cinema, these contemporaries like González were atypical heroines ahead of their time.

In 1952, González starred in Huracán Ramírez, which was a black-and-white movie, in the then emerging genre of lucha libre masked wrestler films. During the 1940s, a series of movies beginning with El Santo and El Hijo del Santo in 1942 popularized lucha libre, literally free-style fighting, masked wrestlers. González would go on to star in the 1962 El misterio de Huracán Ramírez, 1966 El Hijo de Huracán Ramírez and 1967 La venganza de Huracán Ramirez remakes.

== Telenovela career ==
González later worked on Mexican television, including telenovelas. She appeared as a supporting actress in various roles on the telenovelas Así son ellas, Amar otra vez and Alegrijes y rebujos. González' last appearances were on Amar Otra Vez in 2004 as her health began to wane.

== Early life ==
Gonzalez was born in Mexico City on July 11, 1928. Her father insisted upon her earning a college degree in Industrial relations but González studied English and French in the United States. He initially opposed her desire to work in field of drama but won the approval of her mother and appeared in the movie Bésame mucho. González was married briefly to Eduardo Fajardo with whom she bore a daughter, Paloma del Rocío.

== Final years and death ==
González died of pneumonia at 5 am on April 30, 2010, at the hospital Santelena in Mexico City, where she had been hospitalized for several days. She had been recovering from intestinal problems. She was 81 years old.

== Filmography ==
Year	Film	Role	Notes and awards
1945	The Road to Sacramento		
1945	Marina	Pueblerina	
1945
1945	Las cinco advertencias de Satanás		
1946	I Am a Fugitive		as Carmen González
1946	It's Not Enough to Be a Charro		
1946	The Operetta Queen		
1946	El puente del castigo		
1946	Las colegialas		
1946
1946	El barchante Neguib		
1947
1947	El ropavejero		
1947	Una extraña mujer		
1947	Twilight on the Rio Grande		
1947	La niña de mis ojos	Germana	
1947	Tycoon		
1948	E o Mundo se Diverte		as Carmen González
1948	El muchacho alegre		
1948
1948	Que Dios me perdone	Alicia	
1948	Casbah		
1948	El cuarto mandamiento		
1948	The Game Rooster		
1948	Se la llevó el Remington	Gloria	
1949	Comisario en turno		as Carmen Gonzalez
1949	Yo maté a Juan Charrasqueado		as Carmen Gonzalez
1949	El hijo del bandido		
1949	Angels of the Arrabal		
1949
1949	El charro Negro en el norte	Anita	
1950	Matrimonio y mortaja		
1950	Yo también soy de Jalisco		
1950	Aventuras de un nuevo rico		
1950	Barrio bajo		
1951	My Goddaughter's Difficulties		as Carmen González
1951	Doña Clarines		
1951
1951	La trinca del aire	Irene	
1952	Las locuras de Tin-Tan	Lolita	
1952	Subida al cielo	Albina	
1952	Los hijos de María Morales	Gloria Magaña	
1952	Nobody's Children		
1952
1952	Sister Alegría	Sor Mónica	
1953	Huracán Ramírez	Laura	
1953	Canción de cuna		
1953	El jugador		
1953	Dos tipos de cuidado	Rosario	Diosa de Plata (Silver Goddess Award)
1953
1953	Reportaje		
1954	Venganza en el circo	Laura	
1954	La ladrona		
1954	Hijas casaderas		
1954	Ofrenda		
1956	La vida es maravillosa		
1956	Pura vida		
1956	El hombre que quiso ser pobre	Elena	
1956	Around the World in 80 Days		
1958
1958	It Happened in Mexico		
1959
1959	S.O.S., abuelita		
1960
1960	El hombre que perdió el tren		
1961	Culpas ajenas		
1961	Los inocentes		Not to be confused with The Innocents (1963 film)
1962	El hombre del expreso de Oriente		
1962	Espiritismo	Alicia García	Garcia's widow
1965	Secreto de confesión		
1965	El señor doctor		
1966
1966	El Hijo de Huracán Ramírez		
1967	La venganza de Huracán Ramirez		
1967	Aventura en el palacio viejo		
1969
1969	El ojo de vidrio		
1971
1971	Pequeñeces		
1972	Los hermanos coraje		
1972	Lotação Esgotada		
1972
1972	Pedro Só		
1975	Lerpar		
1975	Albures mexicanos		
1976
1976	Los bandidos del río frío		
1977
1977	Sor tequila		
1978	Rosalia		
1978	Los amantes frios		
1978
1978	Cartas de amor de una monja		
1979
1979	El torito puños de oro		
1980	Corazones sin rumbo		
1980	El medio pelo		
1981	La pachanga		
1981	La cosecha de mujeres		
1981
1981	Las braceras		
1982	El torito de Tepito		
1982	Leona Vicario		
1983	La banda de la sotana negra		
1983	Niño pobre, niño rico		
1984	La divina Lola		
1984	Se sufre pero se goza		
1984	El judicial		
1984	El sinvergüenza		
1984
1984	Motel	Carolina López	Pérez's widow
1985
1985	Sinvergüenza pero honrado		
1986
1986	El cachas de oro		
1987	Cinco nacos asaltan Las Vegas		
1987	El diablo, el santo y el tonto		
1988	El cabaretero y sus golfas		
1988	El vergonzoso		
1988	El pecado de Oyuki	Shizuko	
1989	Ángeles blancos	Dolores	
1989	El garañón		
1990	Noche de pánico		
1990	Cuando llega el amor	Carmen	
1990	Un corazón para dos		
1990	Las travesuras de Super Chi-do		
1991	Pedro infante vive?	Carmelita Gonzalez	
1991	Cuando te veo palpito		
1992	Gas Food Lodging	Mexican Woman	as Carmen Gonzales
1992	Ángeles sin paraíso		
1993
1993	Clarisa	Sofía	
1994	Más allá del puente	Queta	
1994	Volver a empezar	Encarnación	
	Amor que mata		
1995
1995	Bajo un mismo rostro	Lucia	
1996	Sentimientos Ajenos	Inés	
1996	La sombra del otro	Coco	
1997
1997	El secreto de Alejandra	Carolina	
1998
1998	Gotita de amor	Honoria	
1999
1999	Alma Rebelde	Simona	
2000	Mi Destino Eres Tú	Asunción Rivadeneira	
2000	Por un beso	Elodia	
2001
2001	Navidad sin fin	Natividad	
2002
2002	Así son ellas	Aunt Luvia	
2004	Mujer, Casos de la Vida Real	14 episodes	1995–2004
2004	Amar otra vez	Lidia	
