= Huracán Ramírez =

Mexican luchador (1926–2006)

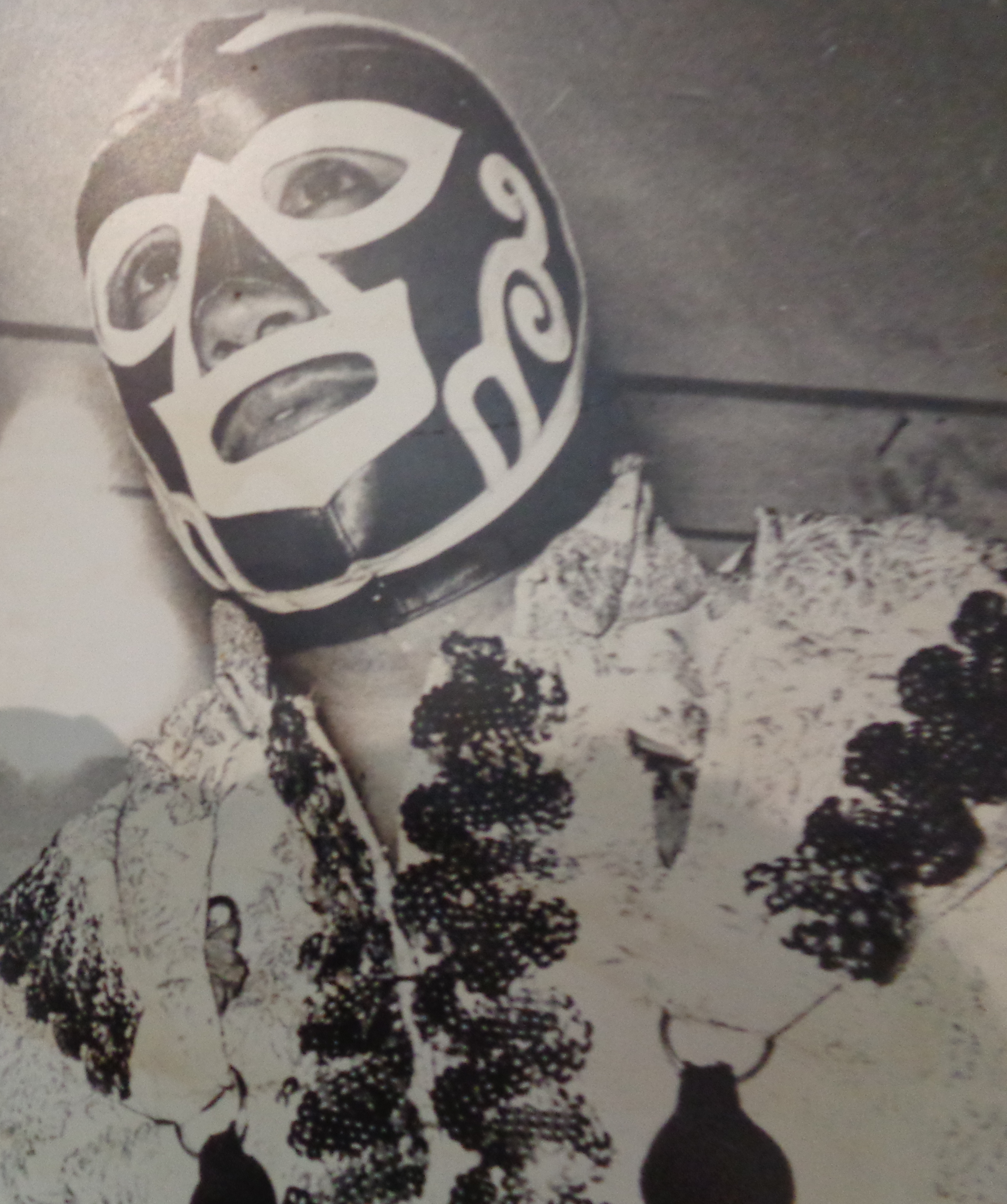
- Huracán Ramírez, c. 1970s

Personal information
- Born: Daniel García Arteaga; April 9, 1926 Mexico City, Mexico
- Died: October 31, 2006 (aged 80) Mexico City, Mexico

Professional wrestling career
- Ring name(s): Buitre Blanco; Chico García; Huracán Ramírez
- Billed height: 1.72 m (5 ft 7 1/2 in)
- Billed weight: 90 kg (198 lb)
- Debut: 1941
- Retired: 1987

Daniel García Arteaga (April 9, 1926 – October 31, 2006), best known under the ring name Huracán Ramírez (English: "Hurricane Ramírez"), was a Mexican professional wrestler and actor. García was neither the first, nor the last, professional wrestler to work under the name "Huracán Ramírez". He was given the name in the mid-1950s, when the wrestler who originally played Huracán in the 1953 film Huracán Ramírez decided to give up the role in the ring because he no longer wanted to obscure his face with the mask. Thus, García became the second wrestler to wrestle in the ring under the Huracán identity.

During his career, his true identity was a closely guarded secret except to his closest family and friends, more closely guarded that any other professional wrestler of that period. Following his retirement the "Huracán Ramírez" name and mask has been used by others, primarily because García did not own the rights to the name and the mask.

García, as Huracán Ramírez, was considered one of the most talented professional wrestlers of his time and one of the most iconic professional wrestlers of all time alongside figures such as El Santo, Blue Demon and Mil Máscaras. He invented and popularized a move called the/la Huracánrana, a move that is now commonly used by smaller, high flying professional wrestlers all over the world. During his career he worked as "Huracán Ramírez" in at least five of the eight movies in the Huracán Ramírez movie series, starting with the second one in 1962. He also played the part of Santo in a biographical movie produced by Santo's son El Hijo del Santo.

== Personal life ==
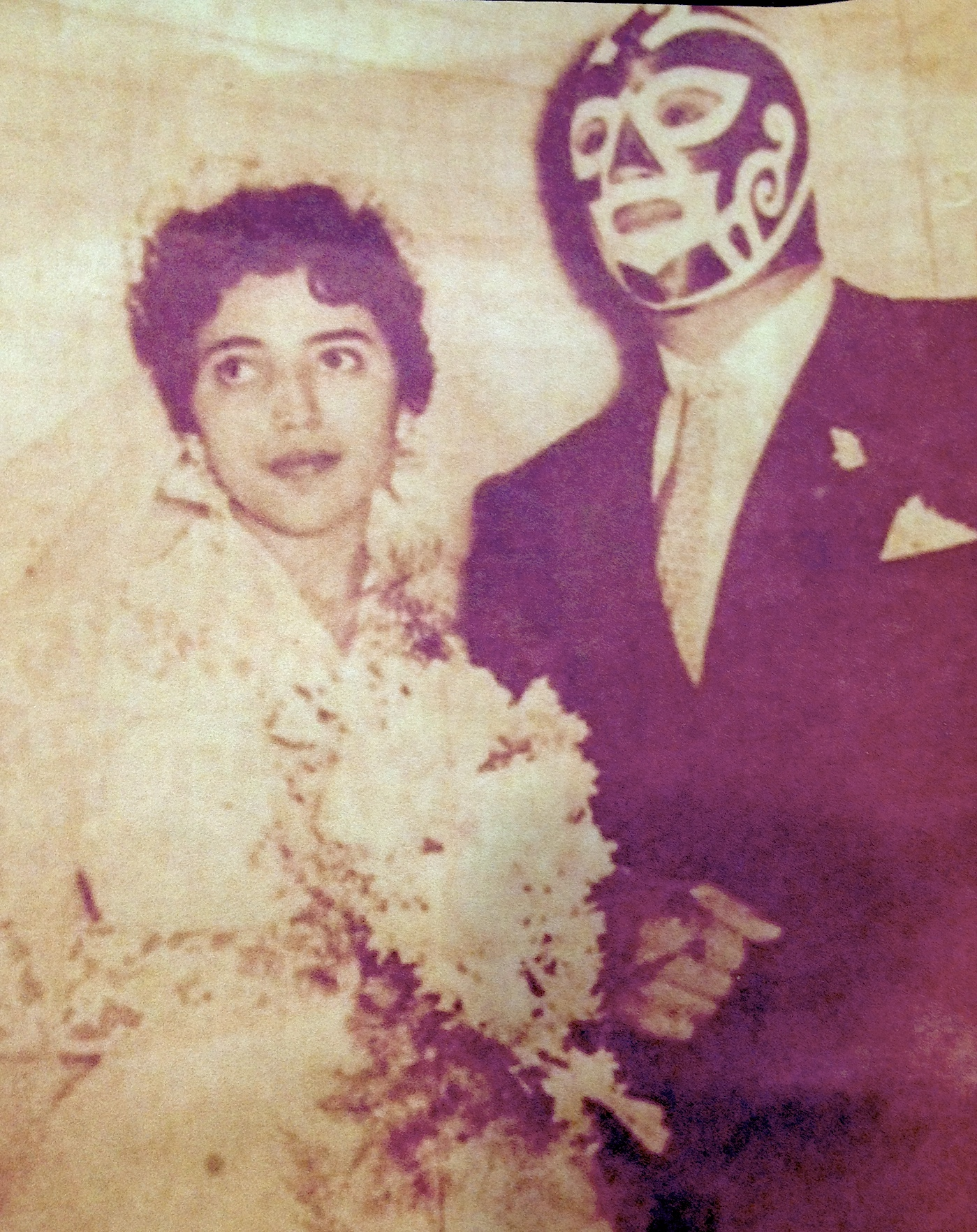
Ramírez with his first wife, Chaly Alvarenga

Daniel García Arteaga was born on April 9, 1926, in Mexico City's El barrio bravo de Tepito district to Juan García and Encarnación Arteaga de García. Daniel was the fifth of six sons all together, Arturo, Rodolfo, Guillermo, Juan, Daniel and Miguel. His mother's family had a long history in Amateur wrestling and a large number of people from Tepito became well known boxers or martial artists. Three of his older brothers became professional wrestlers, Arturo was known under the ring name "La Panter Roja" ("The Red Panther") and later "El Catedrático", Rodolfo wrestled as "Rudy García" and Guillermo worked under the name El Demonio Rojo ("The Red Demon"). Originally Daniel García tried to become a full-time boxer, but due to his small stature, he was never successful.

Daniel García married his first wife, Chaly Alvarenga from El Salvador, in 1957; a few years later they had a daughter named Sandra García Alvarenga. In 1969, he met his second wife Eulalia Fernández during a tour of Bolivia. She moved with García to Mexico City after their marriage, where she would work at the Bolivian Embassy in Mexico City for many years. Together they had one daughter, Karla García Fernández. Karla is married to professional wrestler Axxel, the grandson of El Santo (who was one of García's closest friends).

== Professional wrestling career ==
García's family finally allowed him to become a professional wrestler after having trained for it for years, letting him follow in the footsteps of his older brothers. He started out as the masked character "El Buitre Blanco" (The White Vulture), a rudo character (wrestlers who portray the bad guys), the only time in his career that he worked as a rudo. He would at times also work as the unmasked "Chico García" (Kid García), named after his boyish looks.

=== Huracán Ramírez (1953–1987) ===
García actually had a small, uncredited part in the 1953 movie Huracán Ramírez, where he played both "El Buitre Blanco" and "Chico García" in some of the wrestling scenes. When the wrestler who played the "Huracán Ramírez" role, Eduardo Bonada, wanted to stop wrestling under a mask, the Rodríguez' decided to quietly audition for a new wrestler to take over the mask in the ring. The audition included a number of wrestlers such as Octavio Gaona Jr., Memo Rubio, Marco Carta and Daniel García. The older Rodríguez picked García due to his high flying skills, while his son wanted to go with Marco Carta. In the end García was given the character. Garcia did not have to pay the Rodríguez' for use of the character in the ring, but he was also not entitled to any of the proceeds from the movies or any merchandise the Rodríguez family sold. He was formally introduced as "Huracán Ramírez" in 1953, working a match in Mexico City against one of the top rudos of the time, El Medico Asesino. García's smooth, high flying wrestling style quickly earned him the name El Príncipe de Seda ("The Silk Prince") and it including popularizing a move that became known as the Huracanrana (or "Hurricanrana" in English speaking countries), named after the character. His style of wrestling was so unconventional that fans often commented that he did not actually know how to wrestle, just jump around in the ring, which led García to adopt a ground-based wrestling style to prove that he could wrestle, and that he just chose to work a different style. By the early 1960s, García had become synonymous with the character, making the "wrestling character" so popular that the Rodríguez decided to produce more "Huracán Ramírez" movies, this time with García performing the wrestling scenes. From 1962 to 1973, García appeared in five "Huracán Ramírez" movies. Two movies produced later on focusing on a boxing character called "El Torito" did feature the "Huracán Ramírez" character in a minor role, but García has indicated that he did not actually wear the mask for those two movies. Due to his wrestling style and the popularity of the film series, Huracán Ramírez became one of the top tecnicos in Empresa Mexicana de Lucha Libre (EMLL; later known as Consejo Mundial de Lucha Libre) at the time, regularly working against some of the top rudos such as Medico Asesino, Ray Mendoza, El Solitario, El Enfermero, Karloff Lagarde, René Guajardo, Coloso Colosetti, Dorrell Dixon, Murciélago Velázquez and El Santo. Following El Santo's tecnico turn in 1963, the two formed a regular tag team inside the ring and became lifelong friends outside the ring.

García was one of the first wrestlers ever, and the first Mexican born wrestler, to fight against a boxer, defeating a French boxer known as "El Tigre Francés" in a scripted match. One of his major victories came on June 12, 1964, when he defeated the masked Espanto III ("Terror 3") in a Luchas de Apuesta, or "bet match" where the loser of the match would be forced to unmask. Following his loss, Espanto III removed his mask and revealed that his real name was Luis Miguel Vázquez Bernat. He won the Mexican National Welterweight Championship from Rizado Ruiz on April 3, 1965. A couple of months later he added another championship to his list of accomplishments as he won the NWA World Welterweight Championship from Karloff Lagarde. The title match was just one of many matches the two would have over the years as they developed a long running rivalry. García would win two additional championships, although documentation is unclear on which, but he was promoted as a "Four belt Champion" during one of his many international tours, a claim that was legitimate. He lost the NWA Welterweight title back to Lagarde on September 24, 1965. He lost the Mexican National Welterweight Championship to Alberto Muñoz on February 2, 1966. In 1968 he defeated El Enfermero in a Luchas de Apuestas match, forcing El Enfermero to remove his white mask and announce that his real name was Antonio Navarro Camargo. He regained the Mexican National Welterweight Championship in 1969 and would trade it back and forth with Karloff Lagarde as their rivalry stretched into 1972 and beyond. Over the years he participated and won a number of Luchas de Apuestas matches, winning the mask of wrestlers Halcón de Oro, Moloch, Halcón Dorado, Scorpio, La Tarántula, Blue Angelo, Cadaver II, La Sombra and Los Hermanos Muerte (I and II). He also won the hair of several unmasked wrestlers, defeating Carnicero Grimaldo, Delfin, Espectro I and El Greco in Luchas de Apuestas matches.

Over the years, García traveled all over the world and wrestled as Huracán Ramírez, including Japan, the United States, Europe and a lot of tours of South America including such countries as Guatemala, Panama, Bolivia, Colombia and Ecuador. In some countries such as Ecuador and Bolivia, Huracán Ramírez was more popular and more well known than even El Santo. In 1969, he worked a tour of Bolivia free of charge, drawing crowds to a series of shows benefiting the victims of a September 26, 1969 plane crash that killed all 74 passengers and crew, including an entire team from Bolivian first division soccer club, The Strongest. During the benefit tour, García was introduced to his future wife. In 1974, wrestling promoter Francisco Flores broke away from EMLL to form his own company called Lucha Libre Internacional, later known as the Universal Wrestling Association. Huracán Ramírez was one of the first wrestlers he signed to a contract, using the popularity of the character to establish the company. Over the years Huracán Ramírez regularly teamed with El Santo, as well as with Rayo de Jalisco for trios matches. The trio of Ramírez, Santo and Rayo de Jalisco was wrestling against Los Misioneros de la Muerte ("The Missionaries of Death"; El Signo, El Texano and Negro Navarro) when Santo had a heart attack during the match. It was only through García's quick actions and medical assistance that El Santo survived the day. The same heart condition would later take El Santo's life, and when he was buried (in his silver mask), David García, wearing the Huracán Ramírez mask, was one of Santo's pall bearers.

== Character controversy ==
While García spent over 30 years wrestling as "Huracán Ramírez" and had become synonymous with the character he did not actually hold the rights to the name, thus was not able to personally pass the character on to a second-generation "Huracán Ramírez" in the way Santo had passed his legacy on to his son El Hijo del Santo and Blue Demon passed his name on to adopted son Blue Demon Jr. The rights to the name was at the time owned by Jose Rodriguez Mas, son of the producer of the original Huracán Ramírez movie. At the time García and Mas were close friends, so close that García initially offered his services for a new photo-montage-style comic book about Huracán Ramírez for free in exchange for an eventual share of the profits. When the comic book became a big success, García approached Rodriguez Mas for a share of the profits, but his request was denied. After a heated argument Rodriguez Mas threatened to take the Huracán Ramírez character away from García. Unhappy with the situation and the threat García actually unmasked during a couple of local shows, something that was virtually unheard of in Lucha Libre, an active competitor unmasking voluntarily. The move did not convince Rodriguez Mas to share the profits with García, in fact he stated that he wanted a younger wrestler to take over the "Huracán Ramírez" character. The threat prompted García to take action the very next night. During a show García walked to the ring, removed the mask and showed the fans in the audience and the photographers at ringside his face and revealing his name. The move ensured that the name "Huracán Ramírez" would be forever linked to Daniel García and was a big part of the reason why subsequent efforts to give someone else the name failed to catch the favor of the fans.

== Retirement and death ==
The decades of in-ring wrestling took their toll on García; he had several back surgeries after his retirement, he suffered from four herniated discs and a narrowing of the lumbar channel. On October 31, 2006, García died from a heart attack at the age of 80. Following his death, there was an outpouring of sympathy and tributes from professional wrestlers and fans all over the world.

CMLL paid homage to Garcia by hosting the Copa Daniel García ("Daniel García Cup") on September 20, 2026, in which Brillante Jr. was victorious.

== Championships and accomplishments ==
- Empresa Mexicana de la Lucha Libre
  - Mexican National Welterweight Championship (3 times)

- NWA World Welterweight Championship (1 time)

- Mexican Local promotions
  - Mexican Northern Middleweight Championship (1 time)
- Stampede Wrestling
  - Alberta Tag Team Championship (1 time) - with Roberto Pico
  - Stampede Wrestling International Tag Team Championship (2 times) - with Chet Wallick (1) and Jim Wright (1)
  - NWA Canadian Tag Team Championship (Calgary version) (2 times) - with Roberto Pico (1) and Chet Wallick (1)

== Luchas de Apuestas record ==
Winner (wager)	Loser (wager)	Location	Event	Date	Notes
Huracán Ramírez (mask)	Halcón de Oro (mask)	N/A	Live event	N/A	
Huracán Ramírez (mask)	Moloch (mask)	Mexico City	Live event	June 14, 1955	
Huracán Ramírez (mask)	Halcón Dorado (mask)	Peru	Live event	1959	
Huracán Ramírez (mask)	Carnicero Grimaldo (hair)	Guatemala	Live event	August 1962	
Huracán Ramírez (mask)	Espanto III (mask)	Mexico City	Live event	June 12, 1964	
Huracán Ramírez (mask)	Scorpio (mask)	Mexico City	Live event	December 10, 1965	
Huracán Ramírez (mask)	El Enfermero (mask)	Mexico City	12. Aniversario de Arena México	April 26, 1968	
Huracán Ramírez (mask)	La Tarántula (mask)	Guatemala	Live event	June 1972	
Huracán Ramírez (mask)	Delfin (mask)	Tuxtla Gutierrez, Chiapas	Live event	January 27, 1974	
Huracán Ramírez (mask)	Espectro I (mask)	Pachuca, Hidalgo	Live event	April 29, 1974	
Huracán Ramírez (mask)	Blue Angelo (mask)	Mexico City	Live event	July 24, 1974	
Huracán Ramírez (mask)	Cadaver II (mask)	Tlalnepantla de Baz	Live event	March 30, 1975	
Huracán Ramírez (mask)	La Sombra (mask)	Mexico City	Live event	July 16, 1975	(Note: La Sombra was mostly active during the 1970s. He is not to be confused with the younger wrestler of the same name.)
Huracán Ramírez (mask)	El Greco (hair)	Cuautitlán, Mexico State	Live event	July 29, 1975	
Rayo de Jalisco and Huracán Ramírez (masks)	Los Hermanos Muerte (I and II) (masks)	Mexico City	Live event	September 17, 1978	

== Filmography ==
Year	Title	Role
1953	Huracán Ramírez ("Hurricane Ramírez")	El Buitre Blanco, Chico García (uncredited)
1962	El misterio de Huracán Ramírez ("The Mystery of Hurricane Ramírez")	Hurricane Ramírez
1966	El hijo de Huracán Ramírez ("The Son of Hurricane Ramírez")	Hurricane Ramírez
1967	La venganza de Huracán Ramírez ("The Revenge of Hurricane Ramírez")	Hurricane Ramírez
1973	Huracán Ramírez y la monjita negra ("Hurricane Ramírez and the Black Nun")	Hurricane Ramírez
1974	De sangre chicana ("Of Chicano Blood")	Hurricane Ramírez
1993	La Leyenda (Del Santo)	El Santo
