= Espectro I =

Mexican professional wrestler (1934–1993)

Personal information
- Born: Antonio Hernández Arriaga; February 9, 1934 Mexico City, Mexico
- Died: October 13, 1993 (aged 59) Monterrey, Mexico
- Children: Antonio Hernandez Herrada (son); Arturo Hernandez Herrada (son)
- Family: Antonio Peña (nephew); Espectro Jr. (nephew); Cadaver de Ultratumba (nephew); Guerrero de la Muerte (nephew)

Professional wrestling career
- Ring name(s): Tony Hernández; Espectro de Ultratumba; El Espectro; Espectro I
- Trained by: Rolando Vera
- Debut: 1951
- Retired: September 25, 1959; 1974

Antonio "Toño" Hernández Arriaga (February 9, 1934 – October 13, 1993) was a Mexican professional wrestler, best known under the ring name El Espectro I ("The Specter"), at times referred to as Espectro de Ultratumba ("The Specter from beyond the grave"). As Espectro I, Hernández became famous for his theatrical, elaborate entrances often involving being carried to the ring in a coffin. He has been cited as one of the most charismatic wrestlers of the 1950s, creating a character that inspired multiple successors including his sons who worked as El Hijo del Espectro ("Son of Espectro") and Espectro 2000. He also inspired his nephew Antonio Peña who became the first wrestler to work as Espectro Jr. and later used the creativity and inspiration of the Espanto character to create Asistencia Asesoría y Administración, later known simply as "AAA".

Hernández is one of a limited number of masked wrestlers, to voluntarily unmask, option to remove the mask as he announced his retirement due to injuries. He would later return to wrestling but, without the mask, the Espectro character did not have the same impact. He later became a trainer, having trained such wrestlers as Fuerza Guerrera and the current Espectro Jr.

== Early life ==
Antonio Hernández Arriaga, referred to as "Toño" by his family and friends, was born on February 9, 1934, in Mexico CIty, Mexico. From an early age he was interested in becoming a professional wrestler, persuading Rolando Vera to train him when he turned 16 years old and no longer needed his parents' written permission to train.

== Professional wrestling career ==
Hernández made his in-ring debut in 1951, using the ring name Tony Hernández as he worked for Vera's wrestling promotion in Nuevo León. Early on he worked mainly in the first or second match, not making much headway. In 1953 former referee Roberto Rangel showed a magazine he bought called Los Espectros de Ultratumba (Spanish for "The Spectres from Beyond the Grave)") to local promoter Jesús Garza Hernández. The two thought it would make for a great wrestling character and unbeknownst to Hernández the promoter had a green suit and mask created specifically for Hernández. While Hernández did not like to wrestle in a full body suit, he still went ahead with the character, wrestling as "Espectro de Ultratumba" from that point on. Working with the promoter Hernández began to develop the Espectro de Ultratumba character further, adding in a large degree of theatrics to his matches, including using an actual coffin as part of his entrance. Prior to his matches, he would be carried to the ring in the coffin, often by several hooded pallbearers or wrestlers dressed like ghosts, allowing Espectro to emerge from the coffin "like a ghost rising from the grave". The spectacle of the entrance combined with the showmanship of Hernández himself made the Espectro de Ultratumba character very popular with the locals.

By 1954, he signed a contract with Empresa Mexicana de Lucha Libre (EMLL), which mean he began to wrestle for the largest wrestling promotion in Mexico at the time. When he signed with EMLL he began to work regularly in Mexico City, but was forced to make several changes to his ring character. The Mexico City boxing and wrestling commission requested that he removed the "Ultratumba" from his name and would not allow him to be carried to the ring in a coffin, worried that it would be too scary for kids in attendance. Working under those restrictions he still made an impact in EMLLusing the name El Espectro. On September 23, 1955, Espectro defeated Rolando Vera to win the Occidente Middleweight Championship, holding it for 70 days before losing it back to Rolando Vera. During his early days in EMLL he struck up an in-ring partnership with Karloff Lagarde and an out of the ring friendship that lasted for the rest of their lives. He also formed a successful team with Ray Mendoza, a team that at one point won the Mexican National Tag Team Championship. Records are unclear on which team Espectro and Mendoza defeater, nor does it state who they lost the championship or when. In the late 1950s he formed a team with the original Karis La Momia (Karis "the Mummy") who had a similar "super natural" character. Due to the popularity of the El Espectro character EMLL promoters gave Gerardo Tapia Salinas the role of the second Espectro, Epectro II with Hernández being called "Espectro I", together Los Espectros became a very popular and successful tag team.

On April 21, 1957, Espectro defeated Bobby Bonales to win the vacant Mexican National Light Heavyweight Championship. Over the summer of 1958 Espectro began a long running feud against Torbellino Blanco ("White Whirlwind") that was initially focused on the Mexican National Light Heavyweight Championship, but soon turned into something more personal. The two met put their masks on the line in a Lucha de Apuestas, or "bet match", which was one of the featured matches of the EMLL 25th Anniversary Show. Espectro defeated Torbellino Blanco, forcing his opponent to unmask as a result. The following year, at the EMLL 26th Anniversary Show Hernández voluntarily removed the Espectro mask, announcing that he was retiring. The retirement was brought on by a neck injury Hernández suffered during a match against Joe Grant only a few days prior. Because of the injury the Mexican National Light Heavyweight Championship was vacated.

Hernández surgery was costly. 30,000 Mexican peso, which Lagarde initially offered to pay. Chavo Lutteroth, son of EMLL founder Salvador Lutteroth decide to cover the bill, negotiating with the doctors to only pay half price as a favor to Lutteorth. While he was unable to work the union of professional wrestlers held several shows in his benefit. After recovering Hernández kept training, keeping physically fit by, among other things, practicing Yoga. He returned to the ring in 1962, but was not allowed to wrestle in Mexico City itself due to his prior neck injury. Working smaller shows around Mexico, without his mask, the Espectro character did not go over and well as in the past. In 1974 he lost a Lucha de Apuesta match to Huracán Ramírez and was forced to have his hair shaved off as a result.

== Retirement and death ==
By mid-1974 Hernández' health had deteriorated to the point where he was forced to retire from professional wrestling, opting instead to become a professional wrestling trainer, teaching his students both the technical aspects of lucha libre, a professional wrestling style originary from Mexico, as well as the showmanship he had been renowned in the 1950s. Among his students were his sons Antonio and Arturo Hernández Herrada as well as a third son whose full name has not been revealed. Antonio would work as "El Hijo del Espectro" ("The Son of Espectro") and later on as "Sliver Cat", while Arturo would become Espectro 2000 and then later El Picudo and Devil Rocker. His third son is the enmascarado Espectro de Ultratumba, but since he has not been unmasked so his real name has not been confirmed. Hernández also trained his nephew Antonio Peña and allowed him to take the name "Espectro Jr." He also trained other wrestler such as Climax I and II, Voltio Negro, Guerrero de la Muerte and the original Máscara Sagrada, His finals years were quiet until his death on October 13, 1993, in Mexico City.

== Legacy ==
The Espectro character proved to be so popular and memorable that versions of the character is still used today. Below is a list of wrestlers who at some point has used the Espectro character or a variation there of:

- Espectro II – Gerardo Tapia Salinas, teamed with the original Espectro. Died in 1982.
- Espectro Jr. – Antonio Peña, played the part from 1974 until 1980. Also went by Espectro de Ultratumba (II) in 1985–1986.
- Espectro Jr. (II) – Jose Elías Piceno Rodriguez, Nephew of Hernández, has used the character since 1985.
- Espectro II Jr. – Played the kayfabe role of the son of Espectro II, portrayed by Jaime Enríquez from 2010 through 2014
- Espectro 2000 – Arturo Hernández, son of the original.
- Hijo de Espectro – Antonio Hernández, son of the original.
- Hijo del Espectro II - wrestled on indies and AAA spot-shows in the early '10s, possibly as early as 1985.
- Espectro III - wrestled on early 90s indies and/or late '00s AAA spot-shows. Might refer to other names listed here.
- Espectro II (II) - Tijuana-based luchador (originally from Mexico City) who has wrestled since 1989.
- Rey Espectro - Guillermo Arturo Ramírez Reyes, formerly wrestled as Hijo del Espectro Jr., was sold the name by Espectro Jr. (II), neglected to pay, and changed it in July 2022 amid the fallout.
- Hijo de Espectro Jr. - debuted on May 15, 2022 and wrestles around Guadalajara, seemingly having bought the rights to the name from Espectro Jr. (II) as a result of the Rey Espectro disagreement.
- Espectro de Ultratumba (III) – better known as Gran Cochisse, used name briefly in the 90s in a team with other namesakes.
- Espectro de Ultratumba (IV) - character introduced in 2008, said to be the son of Hernández.
- Espectro de Ultratumba Jr. - '00s/'10s indie wrestler, now goes by simply Ultratumba Jr..
- Cadaver de Ultratumba - A variation of the Espectro character, brother of the current Espectro Jr.
- Espectrito/Espectrito de Ultratumba – Mario Pérez Jiménez, a Mini-Estrella
- Espectrito II/Espectrito de Ultratumba II/Espectrito Jr. – Alejandro Pérez Jiménez, brother of Espectrito I, also a Mini-Estrella
- Espectrito Jr. – Valentín Aguilar García, later known as Mini Chessman.

== Championships and accomplishments ==
- Empresa Mexicana de Lucha Libre

- Mexican National Light Heavyweight Championship (1 time)
- Mexican National Tag Team Championship (1 time) – with Ray Mendoza
- Occidente Middleweight Championship (1 time)

== Luchas de Apuestas record ==
Winner (wager)	Loser (wager)	Location	Event	Date	Notes
El Espectro (mask)	Alex Romano (hair)	Guadalajara, Jalisco	Live event	April 3, 1955	
Espectro I (mask)	Gorillita Flores (hair)	Puebla, Puebla	Live event	July 19, 1958	
Espectro I (mask)	Torbelino Blanco (mask)	Mexico City	EMLL 25th Anniversary Show	September 26, 1958	
Sombra Vengador (mask)	Espectro ($1,000)	N/A	live show	1960	(Note: Instead of putting his mask on the line Espectro I put money on the line.)
Huracán Ramírez (mask)	Espectro (hair)	Pachuca, Hidalgo	live show	April 29, 1974	
