= Angelitos negros (1970 film) =

1970 film

- Directed by: Joselito Rodríguez
- Written by: Joselito Rodríguez
- Starring: Manuel López Ochoa; Martha Rangel; Titina Romay; Juanita Moore
- Cinematography: Eduardo Rojo
- Edited by: Raúl J. Casso
- Music by: Enrico C. Cabiati
- Production company: Cinematográfica Roma
- Release date: 29 August 1970 (Mexico)
- Running time: 105 minutes
- Country: Mexico
- Language: Spanish

Angelitos negros (English: Little Black Angels) is a 1970 Mexican melodrama written and directed by Joselito Rodríguez and starring Manuel López Ochoa, Martha Rangel, Titina Romay, and American actress Juanita Moore, whose voice was dubbed to Spanish. The film is a remake of the 1948 film of the same name, also directed by Joselito Rodríguez, in which Titina Romay played the role of the black daughter in blackface. Rangel and Romay were the director's daughters.

== Plot ==
Juan Carlos Ruiz (Manuel López Ochoa) is a singer who meets Ana Luisa de la Fuente (Martha Rangel), who works at an all-girls school. Juan Carlos begins to court Ana Luisa, who soon starts to demonstrate prejudice against black people, criticizing the fact that Juan Carlos performs alongside black artists like Isabel (Titina Romay, in blackface), a Puerto Rican black woman who loves him. Ana Luisa has a black nanny called Mercé (Juanita Moore) that has cared for her all her life. Though Ana Luisa is fond of her, she mistreats her for being a black servant. Mercé opposes the relationship between Ana Luisa and Juan Carlos and their engagement. She tearfully confesses to Father Francisco (Carlos Martínez Baena) that she is Ana Luisa's real mother. She had an affair with Mr. de la Fuente, her widowed boss. Since Ana Luisa could pass for white, Mercé renounced her motherhood, continuing to work as a servant to be near her.

Ana Luisa marries Juan Carlos, but asks Isabel and Mercé to not come to the wedding ceremony. During a tour, Ana Luisa learns she is pregnant and they return to Mexico, where she gives birth to a daughter, Belén (Juanita Hernández). At the hospital, Ana Luisa is horrified to find out her baby is black. At first, Juan Carlos thinks it's a bad joke, but after learning the truth from Mercé and Father Francisco, he accepts having a black daughter and agrees to "take the blame" for her skin color.

The racist Ana Luisa rejects Belén, who suffers because her mother does not love her. At one point, Belén tries to win over her mother by painting her face white. When Mercé falls ill, Juan Carlos asks Isabel to take care of Belén because her mother does not give her any attention. Tragedy occurs when Ana Luisa, mistakenly believing that Isabel is Juan Carlos's lover, decides to abandon her family. Mercé tries to stop her, but Ana Luisa reacts violently and throws her down the stairs by accident. As she falls down, Juan Carlos tells Ana Luisa that Mercé is her mother. A repentant Ana Luisa begs for Mercé's forgiveness right before she dies.

== Cast ==
- Manuel López Ochoa as Juan Carlos Flores
- Martha Rangel as Ana Luisa de la Fuente
- Titina Romay as Isabel Contreras
- Juanita Moore as Nanny Mercé
- Juanita Hernández Mejia as Belén
- Neftalí López Paez as Mr. López Paez
- Norma Jiménez Pons as Maru Espinosa
- Carlos Martínez Baena as Father Francisco
- Fedora Capdevila as Nurse
- Carlos Bravo y Fernández as Carlillos, reporter (uncredited)
- Joselito Rodríguez as Don Mauricio Badú (uncredited)
- Jesús Magaña as himself, photographer (uncredited)

== Bibliography ==
- McCann, Bob. Encyclopedia of African American Actresses in Film and Television. McFarland, 2009.
- Staggs, Sam. Born to Be Hurt: The Untold Story of Imitation of Life. St. Martin's Publishing Group, 2009. ISBN 978-0-312-37336-8 OCLC 234176069
- García Riera, Emilio. Breve historia del cine mexicano: primer siglo, 1897–1997. Instituto Mexicano de Cinematografía, 1998.
