= Médico Asesino =

Mexican professional wrestler (1920–1960)

Personal information
- Born: Cesáreo Anselmo Manríquez González; August 27, 1920 Chihuahua, Chihuahua, Mexico
- Died: June 16, 1960 (aged 39) Torreón, Coahuila, Mexico
- Cause of death: Cancer

Professional wrestling career
- Ring names: Don Cesáreo; La Bestia; El Asesino; Médico Asesino; El Médico
- Billed height: 1.90 m (6 ft 3 in)
- Billed weight: 125 kg (276 lb)
- Trained by: Verdugo; Joe Marín; Polo Torres

Cesáreo Anselmo Manríquez González (August 27, 1920 – June 16, 1960), known by the ring names Médico Asesino and later El Médico, was a Mexican professional wrestler and actor who wrestled in Mexico and in the NWA territory of Texas. During his career, he most notably held the Mexican National Heavyweight Championship. He was also one of the first luchadores to act in films and TV series.

== Professional wrestling career ==
In 1955, Médico Asesino won the Occidente Tag Team Championship and the Occidente Heavyweight Championship. The following year, he won the Mexican National Heavyweight Championship, which he held at the time of his death.

In 1956, Médico Asesino joined the Dallas, Texas-based promotion Southwest Sports under the ring name El Medico, winning the NWA Texas Heavyweight Championship four times. He also held the NWA Texas Tag Team Championship on three occasions as well as the Texas-version of the NWA Brass Knuckles Championship twice and the NWA World Tag Team Championship at once.

== Acting career ==
In 1952, a superhero motion picture serial was made entitled The Man in the Silver Mask, which was supposed to star El Santo, but he declined to appear in it, because he thought it would fail commercially. Instead, Médico Asesino was cast in the lead role, wearing a white mask similar to Santo's silver one. A villain named "The Silver-Masked Man" was introduced into the plot at the last minute, thus the title of the film strangely became a reference to the villain, not the hero. His last film debut was in 1974 in the movie "The Champions of Justice" in 1971. This movie was a film of various Mexican Masked Superstars Wrestlers.

== Personal life ==
Médico Asesino was the father of Médico Asesino Jr.

== Illness and death ==
Médico Asesino was diagnosed with cancer in 1958 and died on June 16, 1960.

== Championships and accomplishments ==
- Empresa Mexicana de Lucha Libre
  - Mexican National Heavyweight Championship (1 time)
  - Occidente Heavyweight Championship (1 time)
  - Occidente Tag Team Championship (1 time)
- Southwest Sports
  - NWA Texas Heavyweight Championship (4 times)
  - NWA Brass Knuckles Championship (Texas version) (2 times)
  - NWA Texas Tag Team Championship (3 times) – with Pepper Gomez (2 times), and The Amazing Zuma (1 time)
  - NWA World Tag Team Championship (Texas version) (1 time) – with Pepper Gomez
- Wrestling Observer Newsletter
  - Wrestling Observer Hall of Fame (class of 2020)

== Filmography ==
Year	Original title	English title	Role	Notes
1952	El luchador fenómeno	The phenomenal wrestler	Luchador	
1953	La bestia magnífica	The Magnificent Beast		
1953	Huracán Ramírez	Hurricane Ramirez	Luchador	
1954	El enmascarado de plata	The Man in the Silver Mask	El Enmascarado de Plata	
1971	Los Campeones Justicieros	The Champions of Justice	Himself	

== See also ==
- List of premature professional wrestling deaths
