= Angelitos negros (1948 film) =

1948 film by Joselito Rodríguez

- Directed by: Joselito Rodríguez
- Written by: Félix B. Caignet (play); Rogelio A. González (adaptation and dialogue); Fannie Hurst (novel); Joselito Rodríguez (writer)
- Produced by: Ramón Peón
- Starring: Pedro Infante; Emilia Guiú; Rita Montaner; Chela Castro
- Cinematography: José Ortiz Ramos
- Edited by: Fernando Martínez
- Music by: Nacho García; Raúl Lavista
- Production company: Producciones Rodríguez Hermanos
- Distributed by: Variety Distribution
- Release date: 19 November 1948 (Mexico)
- Running time: 100 minutes
- Country: Mexico
- Language: Spanish

Angelitos negros (English: "Little Black Angels") is a 1948 Mexican drama film directed and co-written by Joselito Rodriguez and starring Pedro Infante, Emilia Guiú, Rita Montaner and Chela Castro.

The film deals with themes such as racism, self deprecation, negligence, poverty and social classes.

== Plot ==
Jose Carlos Ruiz is a famous singer that meets Ana Luisa de la Fuente, an assistant manager of a girls school. José Carlos begins to fall in love with her and they become engaged. Then Jose Carlos begins to realize that his future wife is prejudiced against black people, because she does not accept that he performs alongside mulatto artists.

Ana Luisa herself has a nanny called Merce that has cared for her all her life and is a woman of color, she is accustomed to her but openly dislikes her. José Carlos tries his best to resolve the conflicts that his wife's racist attitude brings to their family. Ana Luisa soon gives birth to a daughter who surprisingly turns out to be dark-skinned, horrifying Ana Luisa. They name her Belén.

Belen suffers a lot because her mother does not love her due to the color of her skin. Because of that Belen gets paint on one occasion and paints her face white trying to be accepted by her mom. Ana Luisa blames Jose Carlos' family for having African ancestry. But José Carlos knows the truth. Father Francisco revealed to him that Ana Luisa's real mother is the nanny Merce who in her youth had an affair with her boss, Mr. de la Fuente. In order for her daughter to receive the benefits of inheriting a rich position, Merce renounced her motherhood to be close to her daughter, and took a role as a servant in the household.

Nana Merce falls ill and Jose Carlos tries to bring Isabel, a fellow artist to take care of Belen because her mother does not give her any attention. Then tragedy occurs because Ana Luisa comes to believe that her husband wants to stick his lover in their home and she reacts violently throwing nanny Merce down the stairs by accident. On her deathbed, Merce tells Ana Luisa the truth about her parentage. After this shocking revelation, Ana Luisa accepts her heritage and cries for her mother after she dies. She also decides to start loving her daughter and gives her a hug.

== Cast ==
- Pedro Infante as José Carlos Ruiz
- Emilia Guiú as Ana Luisa de la Fuente
- Rita Montaner as Mercé
- Titina Romay as Belén
- Chela Castro as Isabel
- Nicolás Rodríguez as Padre Francisco
- Antonio R. Frausto as Laureano
- María Douglas as Malú del Rey
- Juan Pulido as Ildefonso Sánchez
- Chimi Monterrey as Fernando Valdés

== Music ==
Pedro Infante sings the title song Angelitos Negros. Andrés Eloy Blanco's poem Píntame Angelitos Negros was set to music by the Mexican composer Manuel Álvarez Maciste. It's a protest against racism.

The instrumental music was written by Nacho García and Raúl Lavista.

== See also ==
- El alma no tiene color, a 1997 telenovela with a similar premise
- Angelitos negros (1970), a remake of this movie also directed by Joselito Rodriguez.
- Tornatrás, a casta for an individual born to a white and "albino" parent

== Bibliography ==
- Juanita Heredia. Transnational Latina Narratives in the Twenty-first Century. Palgrave Macmillan, 2009.
