= El hijo de Huracán Ramírez =

1965 film by Joselito Rodríguez

- Official movie poster
- Directed by: Joselito Rodríguez
- Written by: Joselito Rodríguez; Juan Rodríguez Mas
- Produced by: Juan Rodríguez Mas
- Starring: David Silva; Titina Romay; Pepe Romay; Carmelita González; Freddy Fernández; Tonina Jackson
- Cinematography: Ezequiel Carrasco
- Edited by: Fernando Martínez
- Music by: Sergio Guerrero
- Production companies: Películas Rodríguez; Estudios Churubusco Azteca S.A.
- Distributed by: Cinematográfia Romá
- Release date: 1965
- Running time: 104 minutes
- Country: Mexico
- Language: Spanish

El hijo de Huracán Ramírez (The Son of Hurricane Ramirez) is a 1965 black-and-white Mexican Lucha film co-written directed by Joselito Rodríguez and starring David Silva. It is the third installment of the Huracán film series, following the 1962 sequel, El misterio de Huracán Ramírez.
