= David Silva (actor) =

Mexican actor

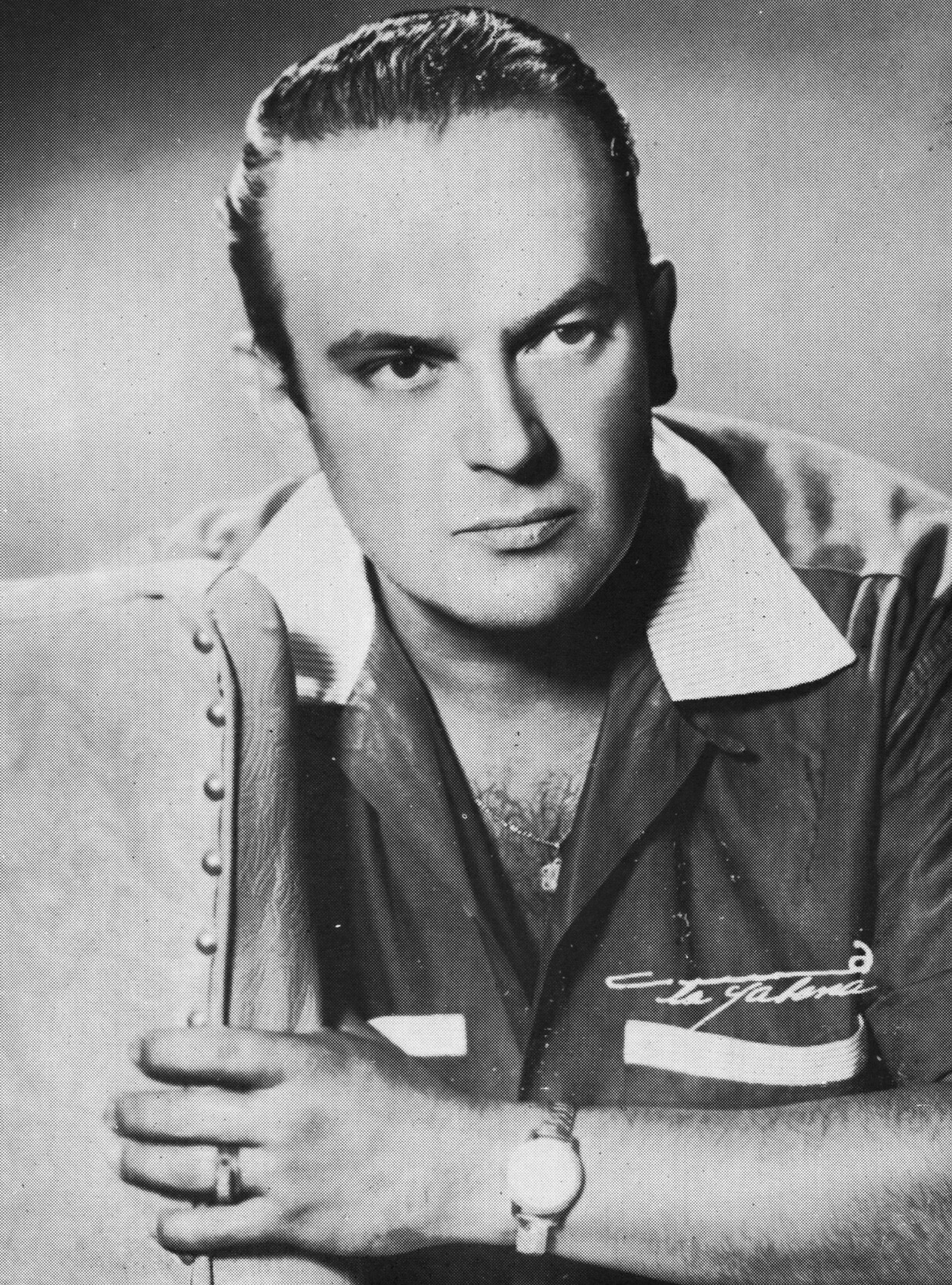
- David Silva in 1954
- Born: David Silva Guglielmeti; 9 October 1917; Mexico City, Mexico
- Died: 21 September 1976 (aged 58); Mexico City, Mexico
- Occupations: Actor & Producer
- Years active: 1937–1976

David Silva Guglielmeti (9 October 1917 – 21 September 1976) was a Mexican actor and occasional producer of the Golden Age of Mexican cinema. In his career, he appeared in more than 100 films and won an Ariel Award for his leading role in the film Champion Without a Crown (1946).

== Selected filmography ==
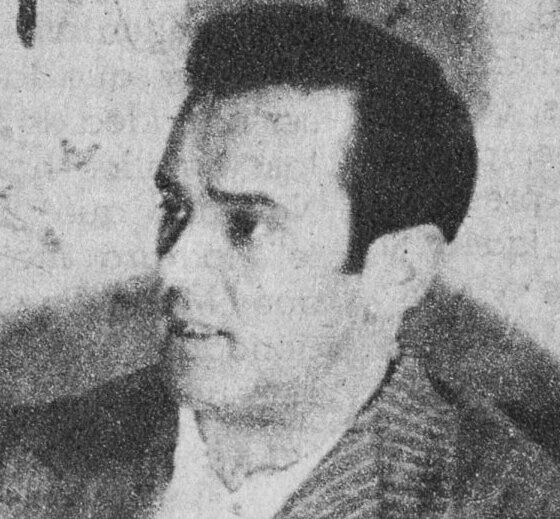
David Silva in 1945

- Bajo el cielo de México (1937)
- La Zandunga (1938) - (uncredited)
- Hombres de mar (1938) - (uncredited)
- La casa del ogro (1938) - Invitado a posada (uncredited)
- Café Concordia (1939) - Julián
- Hombres del aire (1939)
- I Will Live Again (1940) - José
- La gallina clueca (1941) - José (Pepe)
- Regalo de Reyes (1942) - Enrique
- La abuelita (1942) - Fernando
- La Isla de la Pasión (1942) - Julio
- Secreto eterno (The Eternal Secret) (1942) - Luis Navarro
- I'm a Real Mexican (1942) - Juan Fernández
- Yolanda (Brindis de amor) (1942)
- Lo que sólo el hombre puede sufrir (1942) - Miguel
- La posada sangrienta (1943) - Antonio
- Ave sin nido (Anita de Montemar) (1943) - Adolfo Muñóz
- Les Misérables (1943) - Baron Mario de Pontmercy
- Tres hermanos (1943)
- Balajú (1943)
- Porfirio Díaz (1944)
- El mexicano (1944)
- La culpable (1944)
- Flor de Durazno (1945) - Fabián
- Rayando el sol (1946) - Carlos, adulto
- Campeón sin corona (1946) - Roberto 'Kid' Terranova
- Humo en los ojos (1946) - Carlos Gómez
- Me persigue una mujer (1947)
- El amor abrió los ojos (1947)
- Los que volvieron (1948) - Carlos Cervantes
- Madam Temptation (Señora tentación) (1948) - Andrés Valle
- The Flesh Commands (1948)
- The Shadow of the Bridge (1948)
- De pecado en pecado (1948)
- Lazos de fuego (1948)
- Esquina, bajan! (1948) - Gregorio del Prado
- Revenge (1948) - Rafael
- Han matado a Tongolele (1948) - Carlos Blanco
- Una familia de tantas (A Family Like Many Others) (1949) - Roberto del Hierro
- Eterna agonía (1949) - Trinidad Reyes
- Don't Love Me So Much (1949) - Gustavo
- Hay lugar para... ¡dos! (1949) - Gregorio del Prado
- Angels of the Arrabal (1949) - Juan Martínez, el nene
- Rayito de luna (1949) - Julián
- Las puertas del presidio (1949) - Martin Santoyo
- Ventarrón (1949) - Ventarrón
- When the Night Ends (1950) - Gabriel Moreno
- Wife or Lover (1950)
- El desalmado (1950) - Enrique Vidal
- El amor no es ciego (1950) - Pancho Kid
- Nosotras las Taquígrafas (1950) - David Martínez
- Tenement House (1951) - Ramón
- Manos de seda (1951) - Jorge, manos de seda
- Los amantes (1951) - Jorge Rubio
- Radio Patrol (1951) - Rodolfo Nava
- Engagement Ring (1951) - Pablo Galván
- The Lovers (1951) - Julio Castro
- Nobody's Children (1952) - José López Martínez
- Traigo mi 45 (1952) - Francisco Reynoso
- Póker de ases (1952) - David
- El billetero (1953) - Pedro
- Huracán Ramírez (1952) - Fernando Torres / Huracán Ramírez
- The Player (1953) - Alberto Maciel
- Reportaje (1953, dirigido por Emilio Fernández)
- Casta de roble (1954)
- Los Fernández de Peralvillo (1954) - Roberto Márquez
- Espaldas mojadas (1955) - Rafael Améndola Campuzano
- The First Texan (1956) - General Antonio Lopez de Santa Ana
- Esposa te doy (1957) - Alberto del Valle
- La edad de la tentación (1959) - Agente de ministerio público
- Ellas también son rebeldes (1961) - Comandante policía
- Tirando a matar (1961)
- El hombre de la ametralladora (1961) - Juan Morales (El Chicago)
- En busca de la muerte (1961)
- Mañana serán hombres (1961) - Reyes
- Locura de terror (1961) - Professor Jones
- El aviador fenómeno (1961) - Doctor Ingemar
- Trampa fatal (1961) - Carlos Fernández
- Los hermanos del hierro (1961) - Pelón
- Y dios la llamó tierra (1961) - Don Cosme Aguilar, presidente municipal
- Juventud rebelde (jóvenes rebeldes) (1961) - El charrascas
- El fusilamiento (1962)
- La noche del jueves (1962) - Pancho, padre de Anita
- El misterio de Huracán Ramírez (1962) - Fernando
- El barón del terror (1962) - Comandante / lead detective
- La risa de la ciudad (1963) - Rosco
- El hombre de papel (1963) - Inspector de policía
- División narcóticos (1963) - Jefe de policía (Coronel)
- El revolver sangriento (1964) - El Manso
- El mundo de las drogas (1964) - Coronel
- El charro de las calaveras (1965) - Luis Alvatierra
- Cargando con el muerto (1965)
- La recta final (1965) - Sr. Goméz
- Duelo de pistoleros (1966) - Romano
- El cachorro (1966)
- Los malditos (1966)
- El hijo de Huracán Ramírez (1966) - Fernando / Huracan Ramirez
- El secreto del texano (1966)
- Rage (1966) - Truck Driver
- El pistolero desconocido (1967) - El puma
- La mujer murciélago (1968) - No. 1 / José
- Los canallas (1968)
- La venganza de Huracán Ramírez (1969) - Huracán Ramírez
- Una horca para el texano (1969) - Señor Juez
- ¡Arriba las manos texano..! (1969)
- Enigma de muerte (1969) - Señor Robles
- Simplemente vivir (1970) - Compadre
- El topo (1970) - Coronel
- Campeones justicieros (1971) - Dr. Marius Zarkoff / Mano Negra
- Para servir a usted (1971) - Gordo
- Ya somos hombres (1971) - Papá de Germán
- Los desalmados (1971)
- Pubertinaje (1971) - (segment "Una cena de navidad")
- Tacos al carbón (1972) - El chaquiras
- Ángeles y querubines (1972) - Doctor Ismael
- The Holy Mountain (1973) - Fon's father (uncredited)
- El castillo de la pureza (1973) - Inspector
- Aquellos años (1973) - Gen. Leonardo Márquez
- Una rosa sobre el ring (1973)
- La mansión de la locura (1973) - Cult Priest
- San Simón de los Magueyes (1973) - Sr. Cura
- Fe, esperanza y caridad (1974) - Melitón (segment "Fe")
- Cântico Final (1976) - Félix
- Los albañiles (1976) - Ing. Zamora
- Alucarda, la hija de las tinieblas (1977) - Father Lázaro (final film role)
