= Joselito Rodríguez =

Mexican screenwriter (1907–1985)

- Born: 12 February 1907; Mexico City, Mexico
- Died: 14 September 1985 (aged 78); Mexico City, Mexico
- Occupations: Director, Producer, Writer
- Years active: 1932–1979 (film)

Joselito Rodríguez, born José de Jesús Rodríguez Ruelas, (12 February 1907 – 14 September 1985) was a Mexican screenwriter and film director.

His film ¡... Y murió por nosotros! (1951) contributed to a 1950s wave of religious cinema in Mexico.

== Selected filmography ==
=== Director ===
- The Priest's Secret (1941)
- Angelitos negros (1948)
- Anacleto Gets Divorced (1950)
- When Children Sin (1952)
- Black Skull (1960)
- Angelitos negros (1970)

=== Screenwriter ===
- My General's Women (1951)

== Bibliography ==
- Daniel Biltereyst & Daniela Treveri Gennari. Moralizing Cinema: Film, Catholicism, and Power. Routledge, 2014.
