= Mini Abismo Negro =

Mexican professional wrestler

Personal information
- Born: November 21, 1976 (age 49) Huacana, Michoacán, Mexico

Professional wrestling career
- Ring name(s): Mini Abismo Negro; Mini Goldust; Mini Karis La Momia
- Billed height: 1.56 m (5 ft 1 1/2 in)
- Billed weight: 75 kg (165 lb)
- Trained by: Tom Mix Jr. El Canek; Zaprian Petrov
- Debut: 1992

Mini Abismo Negro (born November 21, 1976) is the ring name of a Mexican professional wrestler, who works in the Mini-Estrella division for Asistencia Asesoría y Administración (AAA). Mini Abismo Negro is a former, two time Mexican National Mini-Estrellas Champion and the former AAA World Mini-Estrella Champion, the only wrestler to hold both titles. Mini Abismo Negro's real name is not a matter of public record, as is often the case with masked wrestlers in Mexico where their private lives are kept a secret from the wrestling fans. Working in the Mini division does not automatically mean that he has dwarfism as several short wrestlers work in the "Mini" division, including Mini Abismo Negro.

== Professional wrestling career ==
The wrestler who would later be known as Mini Abismo Negro trained in Olympic style wrestling under Zaprian Petro for three years in school, wrestling at several wrestling meets with great success. He began training for his professional wrestling debut in 1990 under Tom Mix, Jr. and Lucha libre legend El Canek. He made his debut in 1992 and worked for a couple of years in various local professional wrestling promotions before being signed by Asistencia Asesoría y Administración (AAA) in 1996. In AAA he became part of their thriving Mini-Estrellas division and was given the ring character "Mini Karis La Momia", a mini version of Karis La Momia. When Karis La Momia was repackaged as La Parka, Jr. Mini Karis La Momia did not make much sense, keeping him off the shows until AAA could create a new character for him.

=== Mini Goldust ===
When AAA began cooperating with the World Wrestling Federation (WWF) in 1997 several of AAA's Mini-Estrellas were turned into mini versions of WWF wrestlers, in this case Mini Karis La Momia was replaced with "Mini Goldust", a mini version of Goldust complete with gold bodysuit, face paint and blonde wig. As Mini Goldust he mainly teamed with "Mini-WWF wrestlers" Mini Vader and Mini Mankind. That trio teamed up at the 1997 Rey de Reyes event, defeating the team of La Parkita (II), Max Mini and Super Muñequito. Mini Goldust also wrestled matches in North America on WWF events. He teamed with Mascarita Sagrada, Jr. to defeat Mini Mankind and Mini Vader on the March 17, 1997 Raw is War television show. In June, 1997 Mini Goldust competed at the Triplemanía V-A events, losing to Octagoncito, La Parkita and an unidentified third member in a match where he teamed up with Mini Mankind and Pentagoncito. Two days later he teamed with Mini Mankind and Pentagoncito once more, losing to Chivita Rayada, Mini Cibernetico and Octagoncito.

=== Mini Abismo Negro ===
In 1997 AAA founder Antonio Peña created the character Abismo Negro for wrestler Andrés Palomeque and over the first year he became a very successful Rudo (Heel or bad guy). When the working relationship with the WWF cooled off by late 1997 Peña decided to repackage the "Mini-WWF" wrestlers, turning Mini Goldust into Mini Abismo Negro, teaming him up with the normal sized Abismo Negro. Mini Abismo Negro made his first feature show appearance on March 1, 1998, where he teamed with Mini Electroshock and Mini Psicosis, defeating the team of La Parkita, Mini Discovery and Octagoncito on the undercard of the 1998 Rey de Reyes event. On June 5, 1998, Mini Abismo Negro defeated Octagoncito to win the Mexican National Mini-Estrella Championship, his first ever professional wrestling title. Two days after his title win Mini Abismo Negro teamed up with Abismo Negro and Electroshock, losing to Octagoncito, Octagón and Pentagón on the undercard of Triplemanía VI. Over the following year Mini Abismo Negro made several successful title defenses, primarily against Octagoncito and La Parkita. During this time he also became a member of Lucha Libre Latina (LLL) a group that was co-led by Abismo Negro. On May 5, 1999, Octagoncito regained the Mexican National Mini-Estrella title. After several unsuccessful attempts at regaining the Mini-Estrella title LLL decided to create their own version, the LLL Mini-Estrellas Championship, and appointed Mini Abismo Negro the inaugural champion. On July 7, 2000, Octagoncito defeated Mini Abismo Negro on the undercard of Triplemanía VIII, in a match where neither title was on the line. In early 2001 Mini Abismo Negro lost the LLL Minis title to Mascarita Sagrada 2000, who followed up the title victory by throwing the belt away, declaring that the LLL title was no longer active. In late 2002 Mini Abismo Negro and Abismo Negro teamed up to win the first-ever AAA Mascot Tag Team Championship, a tag team title where a regular-sized wrestler and his "mini-version" teamed up. The team only held the Mascot tag team title briefly as they lost the title to Máscara Sagrada and Mascarita Sagrada 2000 on December 13, 2002, on a show in Chilpancingo, Guerrero. On February 1, 2004, Mini Abismo Negro became a two time Mexican National Mini-Estrellas Champion as he defeated Mascarita Sagrada 2000 for the title. He would hold the title for nine months before losing the title back to Mascarita Sagrada 2000 on November 5, 2004. On September 3, 2007, Mini Abismo Negro travelled to Japan along with a number of AAA wrestlers, working a AAA/NOAH show called TripleSEM where he teamed with Mini Histeria, losing to Octagoncito and Mascarita Divina. In January, 2008 Mini Abismo Negro travelled to Puerto Rico, wrestling two matches for the Puerto Rican World Wrestling Council (WWC), defeating Octagoncito and Rikochett one night and losing to Ocagoncito the following night.

In 2007 then Mexican National Mini-Estrella Champion Mascarita Sagrada 2000 left AAA, taking the title with him leaving their Mini-Estrella division without a title. In 2008 AAA decided to create a new championship, the AAA World Mini-Estrella Championship and held an 18-Minis tournament to crown the first champion. The first round of the tournament started on July 20, 2009, where Mini Abismo Negro defeated La Parkita to move on in the tournament. The final match took place on September 14, 2008, on the 2008 Verano de Escandalo show. The match saw Mini Charly Manson defeat Mini Abismo Negro and Octagoncito to win the title. Over the following year Mini Abismo Negro would team with Mini Histeria and Mini Psicosis as Los Mini Vipers as well as participating in various mixed tag matches. On December 11, 2009, Mini Abismo Negro won a nine-man Battle Royal at the 2009 Guerra de Titanes to win the AAA World Mini-Estrellas Championship. He outlasted previous champion Mini Charly Manson as well as Mascarita Divina, Mini Chessman, Mascarita Sagrada 2007, La Parkita Mini Psicosis, Mini Histeria and Octagoncito. At Triplemanía XVIII Octagoncito defeated eight wrestlers including Mini Abismo Negro in a Tables, Ladders and Chairs match to become the new AAA Mini-Estrellas Champion. Mini Abismo Negro was taken out on a stretcher during the match and was attended to by the medical staff.

== Championships and accomplishments ==
- Asistencia Asesoría y Administración
  - AAA World Mini-Estrella Championship (1 time)
  - AAA Mascot Tag Team Championship (1 time) – with Abismo Negro
  - LLL Mini-Estrellas Championship (1 time)
  - Mexican National Mini-Estrella Championship (2 times)

== Luchas de Apuestas record ==
Winner (wager)	Loser (wager)	Location	Event	Date	Notes
Mini Abismo Negro (mask)	Zorro Azul (mask)	N/A	Live event	N/A	
Mini Abismo Negro (mask)	Mini Siniestro (hair)	N/A	Live event	N/A	
Mini Abismo Negro (mask)	Vaquierto (hair)	N/A	Live event	N/A	
