= Triplemanía III =

Triplemanía III was the name used by three professional wrestling events promoted and produced by the Mexican professional wrestling promotion Asistencia Asesoría y Administración (AAA or Triple A). The three events were held on June 10, 18 and 30, 1995. It marked the third year in a row that AAA has held a Triplemanía show and comprised the fifth, sixth, and seventh overall shows held under the Triplemanía banner. Triplemanía III may refer to:

- Triplemanía III-A, the first Triplemanía III show
- Triplemanía III-B, the second Triplemanía III show
- Triplemanía III-C, the third Triplemanía III show
