= Triplemanía III-A =

1995 Lucha Libre AAA World Wide event

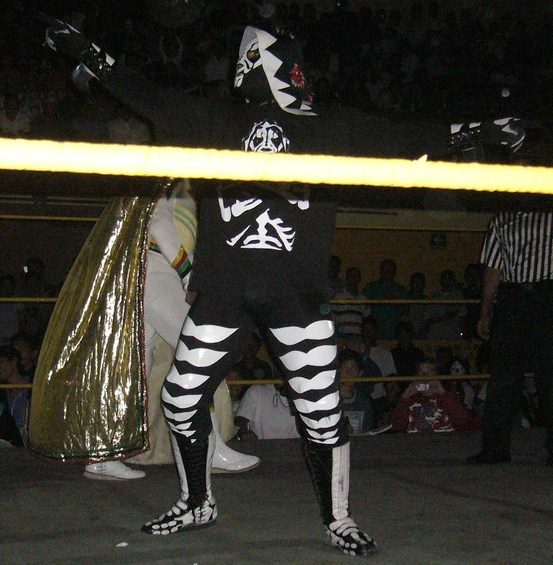
- La Parka, one of eight participants in the - semi-final match of the show
- Promotion: Asistencia Asesoría y Administración
- Date: June 10, 1995
- City: Orizaba, Veracruz, Mexico
- Venue: Plaza de Toros de la Concordia
- Attendance: 14,000

Event chronology
← Previous; AAA When Worlds Collide	Next → Triplemanía III-B

Triplemanía chronology
← Previous; II-C	Next → III-B

Triplemanía III-A was the first of three parts of the third Triplemanía professional wrestling show series promoted by Asistencia Asesoría y Administración (AAA). 1995 was second year to feature the "Triplemanía Series" of shows with 3, referred to as III-A, III-B and III-C. The show took place on June 10, 1995 in Tijuana, Baja California, Mexico. The Main event featured a 13-wrestler Steel Cage Elimination match, Lucha de Apuestas "Mask vs. Mask" match featuring the "Mini-Estrellas" division. The participants included Ninjita, Espectrito I, Espectrito II, Jerrito Estrada, Fuercita Guerrera, Mascarita Sagrada, Mini Calo, Octagoncito, La Parkita, Payasito Rojo, Payasito Azul, Super Muñequito, and Torerito. This marked the first and so far only time that the "Minis division" was featured in the main event of a Triplemanía. The show also featured the first of three Lucha de Apuestas, mask vs. mask match series for the Triplemanía III shows as the culmination of a storyline feud between the tecnico team (faces, those that portray the good guys) of Super Caló and Winners against the Rudo (heels, those that portray the bad guys) team known as Los Diabolicos ("The Diabolical Ones"; Ángel Mortal and Marabunta). Six of the eight matches were later shown on AAA's weekly Televisa show.

== Production ==
=== Background ===
In early 1992 Antonio Peña was working as a booker and storyline writer for Consejo Mundial de Lucha Libre (CMLL), Mexico's largest and the world's oldest wrestling promotion, and was frustrated by CMLL's very conservative approach to professional wrestling, specifically the style of wrestling known as Lucha Libre (Spanish for "freestyle wrestling"). He joined forced with a number of younger, very talented wrestlers who felt like CMLL was not giving them recognition they deserved and decided to split from CMLL to create Asistencia Asesoría y Administración (AAA, or Triple A; Spanish for "Assistance, Consulting, and Administration"). After making a deal with the Televisa television network AAA held their first show in April, 1992. The following year Peña and AAA held their first Triplemanía event, building it into an annual event that would become AAA's Super Bowl event, similar to the WWE's WrestleMania being the biggest show of the year. The 1995 Triplemanía was the third year in a row AAA held a Triplemanía show and the fifth overall show under the Triplemanía banner.

=== Storylines ===
The Triplemanía show featured seven professional wrestling matches with different wrestlers involved in pre-existing scripted feuds, plots and storylines. Wrestlers were portrayed as either heels (referred to as rudos in Mexico, those that portray the "bad guys") or faces (técnicos in Mexico, the "good guy" characters) as they followed a series of tension-building events, which culminated in a wrestling match or series of matches.

Initial plans for the 1995 Triplemanía III series of events included a storyline where Los Gringos Locos members Eddy Guerrero and Art Barr would turn on teammate Konnan in the fall of 1994. This was supposed to turn técnico and set up a Lucha de Apuestas, or bet match, between Konnan and Art Barr where both would put their hair on the line. AAA booker Antonio Peña was hoping to actually sell out the 130,000 seat Estadio Azteca in Mexico City. The plans never came to fruition as Art Barr died suddenly on November 23, 1994 before the storyline even had a chance to start. Barr's death, coupled with the Mexican peso crisis in 1994 led to Guerrero leaving AAA to work in the United States instead and thus made a Los Gringos Locos storyline impossible to piece together. AAA still planned on making the 1995 Triplemanía III event a series of shows, spread out over several weeks, serving as the Super Bowl of AAA's year.

The first two Triplemanía III shows were supposed to take place in late April, but for reason that have not been revealed the first show had to be canceled on the day of the event, leading to a second Triplemanía III show in Arena Rio Nilo in Guadalajara, Jalisco to be changed at the last moment. The show was changed so late in the day that the apron and posters in the arena advertised that the show was a Triplemanía show. The show still featured three high profile matches, starting with the trio of Perro Silva, Karloff Lagarde, Jr. and Mr. Cóndor defeating Las Gemas del Ring (Zafiro, Brillante, Diamante) in a Lucha de Apuestas match, forcing all three Gemas to unmask. The second high profile match was a six-man tag team match for the vacant WWA World Trios Championship, a championship that Peña was allowed to promote on AAA shows. For the Arena Rio Nilo show the father/son combo of Fuerza Guerrera and Juventud Guerrera teamed up with Psicosis to take on the trio of El Hijo del Santo, Octagón and Rey Misterio, Jr. In the end the Guerreras and Psicosis won the match and became the sixth overall WWA World Trios champions. The main event match was for the "Copa Rio Nilo", a one night special feature match between long time rivals Perro Aguayo, Konan and Cien Caras who had been involved in a long running storyline that for Aguayo and Caras stretched back into the 1980s. During the match Cien Caras' brother, Máscara Año 2000 came to ringside and attacked Perro Aguayo, seeking revenge for being unmasked by Aguayo at Triplemanía I. At one point Máscara Año 2000 broke a glass beer bottle over Aguayo's head, causing him to bleed so badly that he had to be taken from the arena on a stretcher. In the end Cien Caras pinned Konnan setting up the team rivalry with Cien Caras and Máscara Año 2000 against Konnan and Perro Aguayo, a feud that would be featured on all three Triplemanía III shows.

In the early 1990s then-Consejo Mundial de Lucha Libre (CMLL) Promoter Antonio Peña created the Mini-Estrellas concept, building on the classic midget wrestling concept but adding a Lucha libre flair to it. When Peña left CMLL to form AAA he made sure the Mini-Estrellas were given a strong presence on the shows and for Triplemanía III-A they were actually given the main event slot. Building off several individual storylines between the Mini-Estrellas AAA promoted a 13-man steel cage match where the last person in the cage would be forced to unmask under Lucha de Apuestas rules. One of the focal points was the emergence of Los Payasitos ("The Little Clowns"), two Mini-Estrella versions of Los Payasos, known as Payasito Azul and Payasito Rojo as they fought against the técnicos Mascarita Sagrada and Mexican National Mini-Estrella Champion Super Muñequito on several shows. Another storyline leading up to the cage match was the feud between and Espectrito I, who had back up in the form of his younger brothers Espectrito II and La Parkita. Octagoncito. Octagoncito had actually defeated Espectrito I in a Lucha de Apuestas match on May 31, 1995 forcing the Mini-Estrella to be shaved bald after the match only 10 days before the show. Others included in the cage match included former Mexican National Mini-Estrellas Champion Furcito Guerrera, Jerrito Estrada, Mini Calo, Torerito and Ninjita.

One of the main storylines that would highlight not only Triplemanía III-A but also Triplemanía III-B and Triplemanía III-C was the feud between the two masked, young técnicos, Super Caló and Winners, fighting against therudo team known as Los Diabolicos, in this case the two masked members Marabunta and Ángel Mortal. The basic storyline centered around two the "veteran" wrestlers in Los Diabolicos getting annoyed with the fan reaction Super Caló and Winners were getting without, in their opinion, earning it by proving themselves in the ring. In the weeks prior to Triplemanía Los Diabolicos had faced off against Super Caló and Winners, often in six-man tag team match with the third Diabolic Mr. Condor against Caló, Winners and various young tecnicos. During those matches Los Diabolicos would often either steal the mask of their opponents, or rip the masks apart during their matches. This led to all four wrestlers signing a contract for a series of Lucha de Apuesta, or bet matches, where each competitor would wager their mask on the outcome of the match. In Lucha Libre a Lucha de Apuestas match is viewed as more prestigious than a championship match and is often promoted as the main event of major shows. The three match series would mean that three out of the four wrestlers would be unmasked by the time the third and final Triplemanía III match was over.

In 1994 AAA luchador, and star of several Luchador films Octagón was one of AAA's main draws, which let Peña to the idea to give him an Evil twin, creating an "Evil mirror image" of Octagón for him to fight against. Peña turned Jesus Andrade, previously known as Espanto Jr. into the masked "Pentagón" character, a rival and distorted mirror image of Octagón. Pentagón made his in-ring debut a month prior to Triplemanía III-A but the in-ring interaction between Pentagón and Octagón had deliberately been limited by AAA, mainly with Pentagón doing sneak attacks during matches leading up to the show. Triplemanía III-A marked the first time the two rivals truly faced off in the ring.

On November 6, 1994 then-Mexican National Light Heavyweight Champion La Parka teamed up with Jerry Estrada and Blue Panther, losing to a team of international wrestling stars The Pegasus Kid, 2 Cold Scorpio, and Tito Santana as part of the AAA When Worlds Collide pay-per-view (PPV). In the weeks following the team loss Jerry Estrada turned on La Parka, turning the increasingly popular La Parka to the técnicos side as Estrada demanded a match for the Mexican National Light Heavyweight Championship. On March 28, 1995 Estrada won the championship from La Parka in a high profile match in Matamoros, Tamaulipas as part of the long running storyline between the two. For Triplemanía III-A the two found themselves on opposite sides of each other in an eight-man "Atómicos" tag team match that paired up four high profile feuds of the time between Konnan and Cien Caras, Perro Aguayo and Máscara Año 2000, La Parka and Jerry Estrada and finally Octagón and Pentagón to complete the two sides.

== Event ==
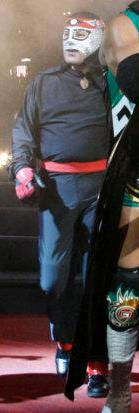
Octagón, one of eight competitors in the seventh match of the night.

This first two matches of the show were not broadcast on Television as part of AAA's weekly wrestling show on Televisa but were dark matches that only the fans in attendance at the Plaza de Toros de la Concordia bull fighting arena saw. The opening match featured AAA's women's division with Martha Villalobos, La Nazi and Neftali taking on a trio of women who had primarily worked for the Universal Wrestling Association (UWA), La Sirenita, Irma Gonzales and Irma Aguilar. The UWA trio was working the show due to a work agreement with the UWA, a promotion that was one of the major Mexican promotions in the 1970s and 1980s but by 1994 was close to going out of business and actually would close in 1995. Villalobos, La Nazi and Neftali defeated the UWA trio, although no records indicated who was pinned. The second Dark Match of the show featured a trio known as Los Misioneros de la Muerte ("The Missionaries of Death"), also originally from the UWA but by this time AAA regulars taking on the team of El Torero, El Mexicano and Dragón de Oro. Los Misioneros originally consisted of El Signo, Negro Navarro and El Texano and later on brought in Black Power II to replace El Texano while working in the UWA. When the group joined AAA Black Power was replaced by a mask wrestler known as Misionero, which may have been Black Power under a mask or possibly former Misionero Rocky Santana, but the identity was never confirmed. Los Misioneros defeated Torero, Mexicano and Dragón de Oro.

The third match of the night was also the first match to be shown on AAA later on, first airing on July 1, 1994 on Televisa along with the fourth match and the main event steel cage match. The fourth match of the night, another traditional lucha libre [ix-man tag team match contested under best two-out-of-three falls rules featured another trio that made its name as part of the UWA but was transitioning to AAA by 1994, Los Villanos, in this case Villano I, Villano III and Villano IV facing one of AAA's top rudo trios Los Payasos ("The Clowns"; Coco Rojo, Coco Verde and Coco Amarillo) who had held the Mexican National Trios Championship on two occasions prior to Triplemanía III-A. Los Villanos won the first fall when they simultaneously pinned all three Payasos and then won the second fall by disqualification when Los Payasos pulled off Los Villanos masks to cause the disqualification, giving Los Villanos the match two falls to none.

The fifth match of the night was one of the featured matches of the night as Super Caló teamed up with rival Ángel Mortal to fight against Winners and Marabunta in what is called a Relevos Increibles Suicidas ("Incredible pairs suicide" match). The concept of that type of match is that two storyline enemies are forced to team together against another team of rivals, in this case their opponents were also their regular tag team partners. The losing team would then be forced to wrestle against each other in a Lucha de Apuestas match as a "punishment" for losing the tag team match. For most of the match Ángel Mortal and Marabunta did not wrestle against each other while Winners and Super Caló only faced off once during the match. Marabunta forced Super Caló to submit, then moments later his Los Diabolicos Ángel Mortal pinned Marabunta to even the sides. Moments later Winners applied a submission hold, forcing Ángel Mortal to tap out. THis allowed Winners and Marabunta to escape with their masks for the night. Traditionally Lucha de Apuestas matches are held under "best two-out-of-three falls" rules, but due to the Relevos Increibles Suicidas stipulation Super Caló and Ángel Mortal fought in a single fall match with their masks on the line, a match Super Caló won by pinfall. Following the match Ángel Mortal tried to escape the arena but was forced back in the ring where he was unmasked and revealed that his real name was Juan Manuel de la Rosa.

In the semi-main event four different storylines intersected in an eight-man "Atómicos" tag team match featuring the top feuds of AAA at the time. Perro Aguayo was accompanied to the ring by his son Perro Aguayo Jr. who was slated to make his in-ring debut at the following Triplemanía III show. For most of the match the rival pairs worked against each other with Perro Aguayo and Máscara Año 2000, Konnan and Cien Caras, La Parka and Jerry Estrada and finally Octagón and Pentagón pairing off. In the end the técnicos side of Aguayo, Konnan, La Parka and Octagón won the match.

The main even steel cage match included referees on the outside of the cage to determine when a wrestler had successfully left the cage and a special Mini-Estrella referee, El Tirantio (a shorter version of referee El Tirantes) inside the cage. During the introductions it was announced that since Espectrito I has just lost a Luchas de Apuestas match to Octagoncito 10 days earlier he was not allowed to compete in the match since he had no hair to "bet" on the match. Initially Espectrito I and his brothers, Espectrito II and La Parkita, tried to keep him in the ring but eventually the other 10 Mini-Estrellas ganged up on him and threw him out of the door of the cage. When the bell run the only way to get out of the match with their mask would be to climb over the top of the 15 foot tall steel cage and climb all the way to the floor. Payacito Azul was the first man to escape the cage only a few minutes into the match, leaving his tag team partner Payacito Rojo behind. The final four competitors were Espectrito II, Octagoncito, Super Muñequito and Payacito Rojo, When Octagoncito tried to escape Espectrito I, who had remained at ringside during the match, climbed up the cage and blocked Octagoncito's exit. Later on he did the same to Super Muñequito preventing him from leaving so that Espectrito II would not end up losing the match. After fighting on top of the cage, then while clinging to the outside of the cage Espectrito II jumped to the floor safely, followed moments later by Octagoncito. After wrestling against each other for a minute or two Super Muñequito took advantage of a mistake by Payasito Rojo and climbed out of the cage as the last man. With his victory he was given credit for Payacito Rojo's mask loss. Following the match Payacito Rojo removed his mask and announced that his real name was Raymundo Rodriguez, better known to the wrestling fans as "Piratita Morgan" ("Little Morgan the Pirate").

== Aftermath ==
This show marked the last time that Raymundo Rodriguez worked under the ring name "Payasito Rojo: as he resumed working as "Piratita Morgan" afterwards and later on also worked as the masked character Battalion in the World Wrestling Federation in 1997 and 1998. It was also the end of Los Payasitos in AAA as his tag team partner Payasito Azul changed his ring name to "Fuercita Guerrera", taking over the ring character for the original Fuercita Guerrera who retired not long after Triplemanía III. At Triplemanía III-B the Mini-Estrella division was featured in the first ever Mini-Estrellas Eight-man "Atómicos" tag team match as Torerito, Super Muñequito, Octagoncito and Mascarita Sagrada defeated Fuercita Guerrera, La Parkita, Espectrito I and Espectrito I when Super Muñequito pinned Espectrito I. Super Muñequito would later lose the Mexican National Mini-Estrella Championship to Espectrito I as part of their long running rivalry.

Cien Caras and Máscara Año 2000 would go on to Triplemanía III-B where they defended their UWA World Heavyweight Championship and IWC World Heavyweight Championship respectively against Perro Aguayo and Konnan in a tag team match with both championships on the line. In the end Cien Caras and Máscara Año 2000 retained their championships when Perro Aguayo was disqualified in the third and final fall of the match. Konnan would later on move to World Championship Wrestling (WCW) and work in the United States for years, putting an end to his rivalry with Cien Caras. Aguayo's rivalry with Cien Caras and Máscara Año 2000 would carry on for years, even beyond Aguayo's initial retirement from wrestling as Cien Caras and Máscara Año 2000 brought him back for one more Luchas de Apuestas match as part of CMLL's 2006 Homenaje a Dos Leyendas show.

At Triplemanía III-B Perro accompanied his son to the ring as he made his debut against Juventud Guerrera, son of Fuerza Guerrera who was at ringside with his son as well. During the match Fuerza Guerra interfered in the match, helping his son gain a victory over Perro Jr. That match started a father/son storyline between the Aguayos and the Guerrera family and would include the two teams fight over the Mexican National Tag Team Championship held by the Guerrera family. The feud ended when Fuerza Guerrera left AAA in late 1995.

La Parka and Estrada found themselves on opposite side of multi-man tag team matches at the subsequent Triplemanía III shows with La Parka's side winning one and Estrada's team winning the second match. On August 6, 1995 La Parka regained the Mexican National Light Heavyweight Championship from Jerry Estrada as their feud continued into 1996. The storyline between Octagón and Pentagón would continue to evolve, stretching out for several years, including the original Pentagón being replaced in 1996 when he had to retire due to health problems. The replacement of the original Pentagón was never officially acknowledged by AAA since Pentagón wore a mask that covered almost his entire face and ring gear that covered everything but his fingertips. The storyline between Octagón and his "evil twin" stretched into 2002 where Octagón finally unmasked Pentagón, although at this time it was a third man under the mask. AAA originally intended to carry the storyline forward into the next "generation" as they introduced Octagón Jr. in 2012 as well as a character supposed to be his rival in Pentagón Jr. In the summer of 2013 the wrestler playing Octagón Jr. left AAA for WWE, cutting any planned storylines short.

The storyline between the team of Winners/Super Caló and Los Diabolicos led to Winners and Marabunta facing off in a Lucha de Apuestas match at the subsequent Triplemanía III-B on June 18, 1995. Winners defeated Marabunta, forcing him to unmask and reveal his real name. As part of the storyline a third and final Lucha de Apuestas match took place on June 30, 1995 and was the main event of Triplemanía III-B Per the stipulation of the previous matches Winners and Super Caló were forced to face off against each other with their masks on the line. In the end Super Caló won, forcing Winners to unmask and reveal his real name, Andrés Alejandro Palomeque González. Palomeque continued to work as Winners for over a year after unmasking, before being given a new ring character, bringing him back as the masked "Abismo Negro" ("Black Abyss"), playing a cheating rudo character, totally opposite of the character he portrayed while working as Winners. Super Caló would be unmasked at Triplemanía XV under similar circumstances as he was forced to wrestle his tag team partner Super Fly as a result of losing an earlier tag team match to Laredo Kid and Gran Apache. In the end Super Fly pinned Super Caló, forcing him to umask after the show and reveal his real name, Rafael García.

== Reception ==
John Molinario, who writes about wrestling for the Canadian Online Explorer, called the three "an outstanding TripleMania series" when reviewing the first five years of Triplemanía in a 2000 article.

== Results ==
No.	Results	Stipulations	Times
1^{D}	Martha Villalobos, La Nazi and Neftali defeated La Sirenita, Irma González and Irma Aguilar	Six-woman "lucha libre rules" tag team match	—
2^{D}	Los Misioneros de la Muerte (El Signo, Negro Navarro and Misionero) defeated El Torero, El Mexicano and Dragón de Oro	Six-man "lucha libre rules" tag team match	—
3	Los Villanos (Villano I, Villano III and Villano IV) defeated Los Payasos (Coco Rojo, Coco Verde and Coco Amarillo) - two falls to none.: Fall One: All three Villanos pinned Coco Rojo and Coco Verde; Fall Two: Los Payasos were disqualified	Six-man "lucha libre rules" tag team match	—
4	The Killer, Scorpio Jr. and Shu el Guerrero defeated Latin Lover, Lizmark and Tinieblas Jr.	Six-man "lucha libre rules" tag team match	—
5	Winners and Marabunta defeated Super Caló and Ángel Mortal (Marabunta pinned Super Caló, Winners pinned Ángel Mortal)	Relevos Increibles Suicidas tag team match	—
6	Super Calo defeated Ángel Mortal	Lucha de Apuestas, "Mask vs. Mask" match	—
7	Konnan, Perro Aguayo, La Parka and Octagón defeated Cien Caras, Máscara Año 2000, Pentagón and Jerry Estrada	Eight-man "Atómicos" tag team match	—
8	Payasito Rojo lost to Super Muñequito; Other participants included Espectrito I, Espectrito II, Jerrito Estrada, Fuercita Guerrera, Mascarita Sagrada, Mini Calo, Ninjita, (Note: Some sources identify the wrestler as Bandita, while others as Ninjita. The announcers on the broadcast itself uses the name Ninjita.) Octagoncito, La Parkita, Payasito Azul, and Torerito	13-Mini-Estrella Steel Cage Elimination match, Lucha de Apuestas, "Mask vs. Mask" with the last man in the cage being unmasked.	12:05
D / – this was a dark match

=== Steel cage order of escape ===
Order	Wrestler	Time
1	Espectrito I	01:30
2	Payacito Azul	02:00
3	Torerito	02:32
4	Ninjita	05:59
5	La Parkita	03:28
6	Mini Calo	04:10
7	Jerrito Estrada	04:34
8	Mascarita Sagrada	05:05
9	Fuercita Guerrera	05:27
10	Espectrito II	08:56
11	Octagoncito	09:19
12	Super Muñequito	12:05
