= Octagoncito (AAA) =

Mexican professional wrestler

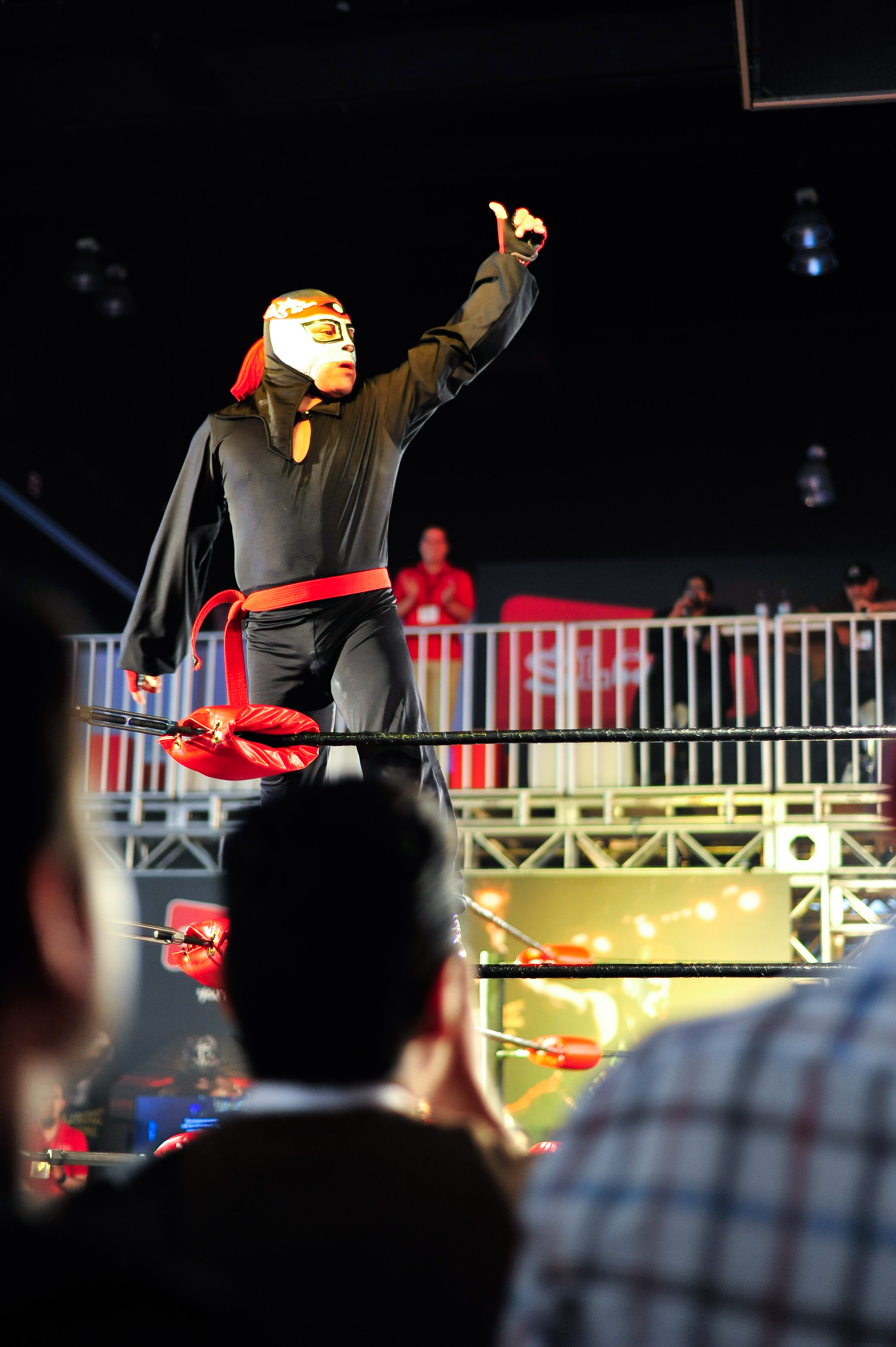
- Octagoncito posing after a victory

Personal information
- Born: March 23, 1972 (age 54) Martínez de la Torre, Veracruz, Mexico

Professional wrestling career
- Ring name(s): La Parkita; Mini Rey Misterio; Octagoncito; Panterita; Zakurita
- Billed height: 1.47 m (4 ft 10 in)
- Billed weight: 62 kg (137 lb)
- Trained by: Cecilio Soriano; Chucho Monrroy; Halcon Star; El Guerrero
- Debut: 1995

Octagoncito (born March 23, 1972) is a Mexican professional wrestler who works for Lucha Libre AAA World Wide's (AAA) Mini-Estrella division. He is the second wrestler to work under the ring name Octagoncito, being given the name after the original Octagoncito left AAA, although he still wrestles under the name on the independent circuit. Octagoncito's real name is not a matter of public record, as is often the case with masked wrestlers in Mexico where their private lives are kept a secret from the wrestling fans. Working in the Mini division does not necessarily mean that he has dwarfism, as several short wrestlers work in the "Mini" division.

== Early life ==
Octagoncito came from a very poor family; his father made a living selling coffee and orange juice and the family had very little money. Growing up he was a big fan of Lucha libre, especially such colorful characters as Super Muñeco and Super Pinocchio. In 1990 his family moved to Jalapa, Veracruz where he began spending a lot of time at Arena Japala gym.

== Professional wrestling career ==
The wrestler who would later become known as Octagoncito began training under Cecilio Soriano, Chucho Monrroy, Halcon Star and El Guerrero in 1993. Due to being so poor however, he could not afford to train full-time, and so he worked on and off in the gyms until making his professional wrestling debut in 1995 in Tulancingo, Hidalgo. He wrestled as a masked Mini-Estrella called Zakurita. He later worked for Lucha Libre AAA World Wide (AAA) under the name Panterita, patterned after the regular-sized wrestler Pantera. In late 1996 the original Mini-Estrella La Parkita left AAA on bad terms and AAA owner Antonio Peña decided to give the La Parkita name, mask and outfit to a new wrestler. He chose the future Octagoncito to wear the skull mask and skeleton bodysuit and wrestle as La Parkita. One of his first appearances as La Parkita was at the World Wrestling Federation's 1997 Royal Rumble show, where he wrestled on the Free for All, pre-pay-per-view portion of the show, teaming with Mascarita Sagrada to defeat Mini Mankind and Mini Vader. On February 21, 1997 he made his first appearance at a major AAA event as he wrestled on the inaugural Rey de Reyes show, teaming with Mini Nova and Super Muñequito, losing to the team of Mini Goldust, Mini Mankind and Mini Vader. Four months later La Parkita teamed with Octagoncito and a third Mini-Estrella to defeat Mini Goldust, Mini Mankind and Pentagoncito on the undercard of Triplemanía V-A.

=== El Pequeño Amo de los Ocho Ángulos ===
After about a year working as La Parkita, Peña decided to drop the character all together since the original La Parka had left the promotion. Peña offered him a new character, "Mini Venum", based on the Venum character from Los Cadetes del Espacion group, a character he was not too thrilled about. After leaving the office he met Octagón, who gave him permission to become the new Octagóncito. Like La Parkita before him the original Octagoncito had left AAA. After he became Octagoncito Peña decided to create a third La Parkita character since he had renamed La Parka, Jr. to just "La Parka". In mid-1997 Mascarita Sagrada, Jr. left AAA, vacating the Mexican National Mini-Estrella Championship in the process. On July 26, 1997 Octagoncito defeated his "Evil Clone" Pentagoncito to win the vacant championship. Octagoncito's title reign lasted for 314 days until Mini Abismo Negro defeated him for the championship on June 5, 1998. Two days later at Triplemanía VI Octagoncito, Octagón and Pentagón defeated Electroshock, Abismo Negro, and Mini Abismo Negro. On May 5, 1999, Octagoncito regained the Mexican National Mini-Estrella Championship from Mini Abismo Negro, becoming the first wrestler to hold the title twice. At the 2000 Verano de Escandalo event Octagoncito, Mascarita Sagrada 2000, and Mini Path Finder defeated Mini Abismo Negro, Mini Psicosis, and Rocky Marvin by disqualification due to cheating. On November 5, 2000 Octagoncito's second reign as Mexican National Mini-Estrella Champion ended when Rocky Marvin won the title from him during a show in Monterrey, Nuevo León. In the early 2000s the AAA Mini-Estrellas division was not as actively promoted as it had been in the past, with Mini-Estrella matches seldom shown on AAA television shows.

In late 2004 Octagoncito began a heated storyline with Mini Psicosis, a feud that led to a Lucha de Apuesta, mask vs. mask match, at the 2005 Rey de Reyes event where Octagoncito was successful, forcing Mini Psicosis to unmask after the match. Five months later the two met in yet another Lucha de Apuesta match, this time Octagoncito earned the right to shave all of Mini Psicosis' hair off after the match. At the 2005 Verano de Escandalo Mascarita Sagrada, Octagoncito, and Rocky Marvin defeated Jerrito Estrada, Mini Abismo Negro, and Mini Psicosis. 2007 was one of the busiest years for the Mini-Estrellas division and for Octagoncito who competed at four of AAA's six major shows that year. On July 15, 2007, he participated in a Relevos Atómicos de locura match (Spanish for "Eight-man madness match") that featured two teams of four, each comprising a male wrestler, a female wrestler, an Exotico wrestler, and a Mini-Estrella each which took place at Triplemanía XV. Octagoncito teamed with El Oriental (Male), Cinthia Moreno (Female) and Pimpinela Escarlata (Exotico), but lost to the team of Alfa (Male), Faby Apache (Female), Mini Abismo Negro and Cassandro (Exotico) when Alfa pinned El Oriental. At the 2007 Verano de Escandalo Octagoncito was once again involved in a Relevos Atómicos de locura match as he teamed with Aero Star, Rey Cometa and Estrellitaing, losing to Alfa, Pirata Morgan, Faby Apache and Mini Chessman. On September 3, 2007, Octagoncito travelled to Japan along with a number of AAA wrestlers to wrestle on a AAA/Pro Wrestling Noah co-promoted show called TripleSEM where he teamed with Mascarita Divina to defeat Los Mini Vipers (Mini Histeria and Mini Abismo Negro). Octagoncito also wrestled in the opening match of the first Antonio Peña Memorial show, teaming with Mascarita Divina and La Parkita to defeat Los Mini Vipers (Mini Charly Manson, Mini Chessman and Mini Histeria).

In mid-2008 AAA decided to create the AAA World Mini-Estrella Championship after the reigning Mexican National Mini-Estrella Champion Mascarita Sagrada left AAA, taking the championship belt with him. The tournament to crown the inaugural champion ran from July 20, 2008, until September 14, 2008, with the finals at the 2008 Verano de Escandalo event. On July 25, 2008, Octagoncito defeated Mini Chessman in the first round of the tournament. Octagoncito was the first of the competitors to qualify for the finals as he defeated Mini Kenzo Suzuki in the semi-finals of the tournament on August 15, 2009. The finals took place on September 14, 2008, in which Mini Charly Manson defeated Mini Abismo Negro and Octagoncito to become the inaugural AAA World Mini-Estrella Champion. On December 11, 2009, Octagoncito was one of nine wrestlers who participated in a Battle Royal for the AAA World Minis title at Guerra de Titanes (2009). Octagoncito was the eighth and last man eliminated from the match, thrown out of the ring by Mini Abismo Negro who won the title as a result. In May 2010 AAA announced that they were planning to hold the first ever Mini-Estrellas Tables, Ladders, and Chairs match at Triplemanía XVIII where Mini Abismo Negro would defend the title against six challengers, including Octagoncito. In the weeks leading up to the event Mini Abismo Negro, Mini Histeria and Mini Psicosis defeated Mascarita Divina, Mini Charly Manson and Octagoncito in a match that featured the use of both tables, ladders and chairs to preview the Triplemanía XVIII match. At Triplemanía XVIII Octagoncito outlasted eight other wrestlers (La Parkita and Mini Chessman were late additions to the match) in the TLC match to become the new AAA Mini-Estrella Champion. On April 27, 2011, Octagoncito lost the Mini-Estrella Championship to Mini Psicosis, the second incarnation of the character, not to be confused with the one he feuded with in 2000.

== Personal life ==
Octagoncito and his wife, luchadora Lady Sensacion, have a son, born in 2007.

== Championships and accomplishments ==
- Lucha Libre AAA World Wide
  - AAA World Mini-Estrella Championship (1 time)
  - Mexican National Mini-Estrella Championship (2 times)
- Local Mexican Promotions
  - Veracruz Mini-Estrellas Championship (1 time)

== Luchas de Apuestas record ==
Winner (wager)	Loser (wager)	Location	Event	Date	Notes
Octagoncito (mask)	Humberto Tenorio (hair)	N/A	Live event	N/A	
Octagoncito (mask)	Guerrerito 2000 (mask)	N/A	Live event	N/A	
Octagoncito (mask)	American Crazzy (mask)	N/A	Live event	N/A	
Octagoncito (mask)	Espectrito II (mask)	Ciudad Madero, Tamaulipas	Live event	July 28, 1997	(Note: Lost a Relevos Suicidas to La Parkita and Mini Siniestro and was forced to wrestle each other.)
Octagoncito (mask)	Mini Psicosis (mask)	Ciudad Madero, Tamaulipas	Rey de Reyes	March 11, 2005	
Octagoncito (mask)	El Indomable (hair)	Veracruz, Veracruz	Live event	August 17, 2005	
Octagoncito (mask)	Mini Psicosis (hair)	Cuernavaca, Morelos	Live event	August 20, 2005	
