= Triplemanía III-C =

1995 Lucha Libre AAA World Wide event

- Official poster
- Promotion: Asistencia Asesoría y Administración
- Date: June 30, 1995
- City: Madero, Mexico
- Venue: Convention Center
- Attendance: 16,300

Triplemanía chronology
← Previous; III-B	Next → IV-A

Triplemanía III-C was the third part of the third Triplemanía professional wrestling show promoted by Asistencia Asesoría y Administración (AAA). 1995 was second year to feature the "Triplemanía Series" of shows with 3, referred to as III-A, III-B and III-C, where this was the third and final of the series in 1995. The show was the seventh overall show held under the Triplemanía name. The show took place on June 30, 1995, in Madero, Mexico. The Main event featured a Best two out of three falls Lucha de Apuestas "Mask vs. Mask" match where friends and tag team partners Super Caló and Winners put their masks on the line in the match.

== Production ==
=== Background ===
Initial plans for the 1995 Triplemanía III series of events included a storyline where Los Gringos Locos members Eddy Guerrero and Art Barr would turn on teammate Konnan in the fall of 1994. This was supposed to turn técnico and set up a Luchas de Apuestas, or bet match, between Konnan and Art Barr where both would put their hair on the line. AAA booker Antonio Peña was hoping to actually sell out the 130,000 seat Estadio Azteca in Mexico City. The plans never came to fruition as Art Barr died suddenly on November 23, 1994, before the storyline even had a chance to start. Barr's death, coupled with the Mexican peso crisis in 1994 led to Guerrero leaving AAA to work in the United States instead and thus made a Los Gringos Locos storyline impossible to piece together. AAA still planned on making the 1995 Triplemanía III event a series of shows, spread out over several weeks, serving as the Super Bowl of AAA's year.

=== Storylines ===
The event featured six professional wrestling matches with different wrestlers involved in pre-existing scripted feuds, plots and storylines. Wrestlers were portrayed as either villains (referred to as rudos in Mexico) or fan favorites (técnicos in Mexico) as they followed a series of tension-building events, which culminated in a wrestling match or series of matches.

One of the main storylines that would highlight all three Triplemanía III shows was the ongoing storyline between two teams, the masked, young técnico team of Super Caló and Winners, fighting against therudo team known as Los Diabolicos, in this case, the two masked members Marabunta and Ángel Mortal. The basic storyline centered on two of the "veteran" wrestlers in Los Diabolicos getting annoyed with the fan reaction Super Caló and Winners were getting without, in their opinion, earning it by proving themselves in the ring. In the weeks prior to Triplemanía, Los Diabolicos had faced off against Super Caló and Winners, often in six-man tag team match with the third Diabolic Mr. Condor against Caló, Winners and various young tecnicos. During those matches, Los Diabolicos would often either steal the mask of their opponents, or rip the masks apart during their matches. This led to all four wrestlers signing a contract for a series of Lucha de Apuesta, or bet matches, where each competitor would wager their mask on the outcome of the match. In Lucha Libre a Lucha de Apuestas match is viewed as more prestigious than a championship match and is often promoted as the main event of major shows. The three match series would mean that three out of the four wrestlers would be unmasked by the time the third and final Triplemanía III match was over. At Triplemanía III-A Winners and Marabunta won their match, which resulted in Super Caló later pining Ángel Mortal to unmask him. The victory for Winners and Marabunta did not mean that their masks were safe, instead, it meant that the two had to wrestle in the main event of TripleManía III-B under Lucha de Apuestas rules. At TripleManía III-B Super Caló defeated and unmasked Marabunta. Due to the contract that Winners and Super Caló had agreed to the tag team partners, and friends would be forced to wrestle each other, defending their masks in the main event of TripleManía III-B.

== Aftermath ==
Winners and Super Caló remained friends and occasional tag team partners after Winners lost his mask to Super Caló. Unmasked he became very popular with the female fans in the audience over the next year, but by the fall of 1996 Winners disappeared from AAA. Antonio Peña decided that the man behind the Winners character, Andrés Palomeque González, would be given a new character, a masked character known as "Abismo Negro" ("Black Abyss") a rudo character that was the complete opposite of the Winners character he had previously played. 12 years after Super Caló won the mask of his friend he found himself involved in another Relevos Suicidas, this time at Triplemanía XV, this time Super Caló and Super Fly lost to Laredo Kid and Gran Apache and were forced to fight for their masks. On the night Super Fly pinned his friend and some times tag team partner Super Caló to force him to unmask and reveal his real name, Rafael García.

In the fall of 1995, Konnan and several other AAA workers created Promotora Mexicana de Lucha Libre (PROMLL), later named Promo Azteca, talking a large number of AAA main stays with them. Initially they worked with AAA, acting more as a booking agency than a separate promotion, but by 1996 Promo Azteca broke off their relationship with AAA completely.

In the months following Triplemanía III-C the Mattel corporation threatened an infringement lawsuit by AAA use of the Los Power Raiders characters, citing that they were direct copies of the Power Rangers franchise. AAA abandoned the "Power Raiders" concept, creating all original characters known as Los Cadetes del Espacio ("The Space Cadets") with Venum, Ludxor, Discovery, Frisbee and Boomerang.

== Reception ==
John Molinario, who writes about wrestling for the Canadian Online Explorer, called the three TripleManía III shows "an outstanding TripleMania series" when reviewing the first five years of AAA's Triplemanía in a 2000 article.

== Results ==
No.	Results	Stipulations
1	Los Power Raiders (Power Raider Rojo, Power Raider Blanco, Power Raider Verde, Power Raider Negro and Power Raider Azul) defeated Espectro, Karis la Momia, El Duende, Maniaco, and Halloween	Best two-out-of-three falls eight-man "Atómicos" tag team match
2	Ángel Azteca, Super Muñeco, and Águila de Acero defeated Heavy Metal, El Picudo, and Pentagón	Best two-out-of-three falls six-man "Lucha Libre rules" tag team match
3	Mascarita Sagrada, Octagoncito, and Super Muñequito defeated Jerrito Estrada, Fuercita Guerrera, and Espectrito	Best two-out-of-three falls six-man "Lucha Libre rules" tag team match
4	El Hijo del Santo, Octagón and Rey Misterio Jr. defeated Fuerza Guerrera, Blue Panther and Psicosis by disqualification	Best two-out-of-three falls six-man "Lucha Libre rules" tag team match
5	Cien Caras, Máscara Año 2000, Fishman and Jerry Estrada defeated Konnan, Perro Aguayo, Latin Lover and Máscara Sagrada	Best two-out-of-three falls eight-man "Atómicos" tag team match
6	Super Caló defeated Winners	Best two-out-of-three falls Lucha de Apuesta, "Mask vs. Mask" match.
