= Mini Psicosis =

Mexican professional wrestler

Personal information
- Born: Enrique Del Rio; May 28, 1966 (age 60)

Professional wrestling career
- Ring name(s): Jerrito Estrada; Mini Psicosis; Venum
- Billed height: 1.56 m (5 ft 1 1/2 in)
- Billed weight: 75 kg (165 lb)
- Trained by: Panchito Villalobos; El Hijo del Gladiador
- Debut: 1991

Enrique Del Rio (born May 28, 1966) is a Mexican professional wrestler, who has worked for Lucha Libre AAA World Wide's (AAA) Mini-Estrella division since AAA was founded in 1992. Del Rio currently works under the ring name Mini Psicosis, a smaller version of Psicosis II, and is a former AAA World Mini-Estrella Champion. Until 2008 he worked as Jerrito Estrada, a smaller version of the wrestler Jerry Estrada. As Estrada Del Rio has held the Mexican National Mini-Estrella Championship once, being the shortest reigning champion in the title's history. Working in the Mini division does not automatically mean that he has dwarfism as several short wrestlers work in the "Mini" division, including Enrique Del Rio.

== Professional wrestling career ==
Enrique Del Rio received his professional wrestling training from Panchito Villalobos and El Hijo del Gladiador; Villalobos is known for training a large number of Mini-Estrellas while Hijo del Gladiador has had a hand in training hundreds of professional wrestlers both regular sized and Mini-Estrellas. Del Rios made his wrestling debut in 1991, working for Empresa Mexicana de Lucha Libre (EMLL). He was given the ring name Jerrito Estrada, after regular-sized wrestler Jerry Estrada, to whom Del Rio had both a physical and facial similarity. When the creator of EMLL's Minis division, Antonio Peña, left EMLL to form his own promotion Lucha Libre AAA World Wide (AAA), Jerrito Estrada and a number of other Minis left EMLL to join AAA. Jerrito Estrada wrestled on the first AAA show on May 15, 1992, and thus is one of only two men, the other being Octagón, who have worked for AAA since it was created in 1992. Since only Octagón still uses the same character as when AAA began Enrique Del Rio is often overlooked. Jerrito Estrada was part of the first Triplemanía event, teaming with Jerry Estrada and Blue Panther, only to lose to Minis rival Mascarita Sagrada, Máscara Sagrada and Love Machine While Mascarita Sagrada's team had been successful at Triplemanía Jerrito Estrada scored a bigger victory when he won the Mexican National Mini-Estrella Championship from Sagrada on February 4, 1994. His reign with the title was short-lived as Octagoncito won the belt from him on March 26, 1994. Jerrito Estrada's 26-day reign is the shortest reign in the history of the championship.

Estrada would participate in two of the three Triplemanían events held in 1994. First he teamed with Espectrito and Fuercito Guerrera, only to lose by disqualification for cheating against the team of Mascarita Sagrada, Octagoncito and Super Muñequito at Triplemanía II-A. Three months later, on May 15, 1994, at Triplemanía II-B, he teamed with Mascarita Sagrada to defeat Micro Konnan and Espectrito in a Parejas Suicida match where opponents are forced to team up. On November 4, 1994, Espectrito and Jerrito Estrada teamed up only to lose to Mascarita Sagrada and Octagoncito on AAA's first ever Pay-Per-View event When Worlds Collide The following year Jerrito Estrada was one of 13 Mini-Estrellas who put their hair or their mask on the line in a steel Cage Match. The match was the main event of Triplemanía III-A and the only time a Triplemanía has featured a Mini-Estrellas match as its main event. Jerrito Estrada escaped the cage, watching from the outside as Payasito Rojo lost the match and was forced to unmask. At Triplemanía III-C Jerrito, Fuercita Guerrera and Espectrito lost to Mascarita Sagrada, Octagoncito, and Super Muñequito. In late 1996 Jerrito Estrada wrestled in a dark match before Starrcade 1996 where he teamed with Piratita Morgan and defeated Mascarita Sagrada and Octagoncito. the next day the teams faced again, this time on Monday Nitro, both times saw Sagrada and Octagoncito win. Between 1996 and 2005 Jerrito Estrada only made sporadic appearances for AAA, not competing at any major events for several years.

Jerrito Estrada teamed up with Mini Abismo Negro and Mini Psicosis in a loss to the team of Mascarita Sagrada, Octagoncito (Second version) and Rocky Marvin on the undercard of the 2005 Verano de Escandalo show. In December, 2005 Jerrito Estrada, Mini Psicosis and Mini Abismo Negro defeated Octagoncito, Mascarita Sagrada and Mascarita Sagrada Jr. at AAA's annual Guerra de Titanes show. At Triplemanía XIV Jerrito Estrada, Mini Abismo Negro, and Mini Chessman lost to La Parkita, Mascarita Sagrada 2000, and Octagoncito. In the summer of 2008 AAA decided to create the AAA World Mini-Estrella Championship after the reigning Mexican National Mini-Estrella Champion Mascarita Sagrada left AAA, taking the championship belt with him. Jerrito Estrada lost to Mini Charly Manson in the first round.

=== Los Mini Vipers ===
Not long after his loss in the Mini-Estrella Championship tournament Jerrito Estrada disappeared from television. A short time Mini Psicosis, a new enmascarado character patterned on Psicosis II was introduced taking Jerrito's spot. He took over the Mini Psicosis role after the previous Mini Psicosis left AAA to join a rival promotion. The first Mini Psicosis had been unmasked, but his successor wore the distinctive horn adorned mask of Psicosis. . Together with Mini Abismo Negro and Mini Histeria he formed the Los Mini Vipers group. On December 11, 2009, Mini Psicosis was one of nine wrestlers who participated in a Battle Royal for the AAA World Minis title at Guerra de Titanes (2009). Mini Psicosis was the sixth man eliminated, ousted before his Los Mini Vipers teammate Mini Abismo Negro won the title. In May, 2010 AAA announced that they were planning to hold the first ever Mini-Estrellas Tables, Ladders, and Chairs match at Triplemanía XVIII where Mini Abismo Negro would defend the title against six challengers, including fellow Mini Viper Mini Psicosis. In the weeks leading up to the event Mini Abismo Negro, Mini Histeria and Mini Psicosis defeated Mascarita Divina, Mini Charly Manson and Octagoncito in a match that featured the use of both tables, ladders and chairs to preview the Triplemanía XVIII match. At Triplemanía XVIII Octagoncito outlasted eight other wrestlers (La Parkita and Mini Chessman were late additions to the match) in the TLC match to become the new AAA Mini-Estrella Champion. On April 27, 2011, Mini Psicosis defeated Octagoncito to win the AAA World Mini-Estrella Championship. After the longest reign in the history of the AAA World Mini-Estrella Championship, he lost the title to Dinastía on February 18, 2013.

== Championships and accomplishments ==
- Lucha Libre AAA World Wide
  - AAA World Mini-Estrella Championship (1 time)
  - Mexican National Mini-Estrella Championship (1 time)

== Luchas de Apuestas record ==
Winner (wager)	Loser (wager)	Location	Event	Date	Notes
Jerrito Estrada (hair)	Milenio (mask)	N/A	Live event	N/A	
Jerrito Estrada (hair)	Mini Sanguinario (mask)	N/A	Live event	N/A	
Jerrito Estrada (hair)	Ringuito Mendoza (hair)	N/A	Live event	N/A	
Jerrito Estrada (hair)	El Espacial (mask)	Torreón, Coahuila	Live event	N/A	
Jerrito Estrada (hair)	Ringuito Mendoza (hair)	Naucalpan, Mexico State	Live event	N/A	
Jerrito Estrada (hair)	Piratita Morgan (hair)	Monterrey, Nuevo León	Live event	July 31, 1992	
Jerrito Estrada (hair)	Piratita Morgan (hair)	Mexico City	Live event	November 5, 1993	
Micro Konnan (hair)	Jerrito Estrada (hair)	León, Guanajuato	Live event	July 18, 1994	
