= Rey de Reyes (1997) =

1997 Lucha Libre AAA World Wide event

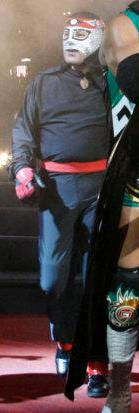
- Octagón, Rey de Reyes tournament finalist
- Promotion: AAA
- Date: February 21, 1997
- City: Ciudad Madero, Tamaulipas, Mexico
- Venue: Convention Center
- Attendance: 9,000

Event chronology
| ← Previous; Triplemanía IV-C | Next → Triplemanía V-A |

Rey de Reyes chronology
| ← Previous; First | Next → 1998 |

The Rey de Reyes 1997 (Spanish for "King of Kings") was the first annual Rey de Reyes professional wrestling tournament and major wrestling show, produced by the Mexican wrestling promotion AAA. The event took place on February 21, 1997 in the Convention Center in Ciudad Madero, Tamaulipas, Mexico. The Rey de Reyes tournament consisted of a semi-final round of four four-man elimination matches and a final match with the winners of each of the semi-finals facing off in an elimination match until only one man remained. The show also featured a Mini-Estrella Six-man "Lucha Libre rules" tag team match between the teams of Mini Goldust, Mini Mankind and Mini Vader going against La Parkita, Mini Nova and Super Muñequito. The final match of the tournament pitted Latin Lover, Heavy Metal, Héctor Garza and Octagón against each other.

== Production ==
=== Background ===
Starting in 1997 and every year since then the Mexican Lucha Libre, or professional wrestling, company AAA, or Triple A, has held a Rey de Reyes (Spanish for "King of Kings') show in the spring. The 1997 version was held in February, while all subsequent Rey de Reyes shows were held in March. As part of their annual Rey de Reyes event AAA holds the eponymious Rey de Reyes tournament to determine that specific year's Rey. Most years the show hosts both the qualifying round and the final match, but on occasion the qualifying matches have been held prior to the event as part of AAA's weekly television shows. The traditional format consists of four preliminary rounds, each a Four-man elimination match with each of the four winners face off in the tournament finals, again under elimination rules. There have been years where AAA has employed a different format to determine a winner. The winner of the Rey de Reyes tournament is given a large ornamental sword to symbolize their victory, but is normally not guaranteed any other rewards for winning the tournament, although some years becoming the Rey de Reyes has earned the winner a match for the AAA Mega Championship. From 1999 through 2009 AAA also held an annual Reina de Reinas ("Queen of Queens") tournament, but later turned that into an actual championship that could be defended at any point during the year, abandoning the annual tournament concept. The 1997 show was the first Rey de Reyes show in the series.

=== Storylines ===
The Rey de Reyes show featured six professional wrestling matches with different wrestlers involved in pre-existing, scripted feuds, plots, and storylines. Wrestlers were portrayed as either heels (referred to as rudos in Mexico, those that portray the "bad guys") or faces (técnicos in Mexico, the "good guy" characters) as they followed a series of tension-building events, which culminated in a wrestling match or series of matches.

== Results ==
| No. | Results | Stipulations |
|---|---|---|
| 1 | Venum, Ludxor, Discovery, and Super Nova defeated Histeria, Mosco de la Merced, Mach-1, and Picudo | Eight-man "Lucha Libre rules" tag team match |
| 2 | Latin Lover defeated Máscara Sagrada Jr., Jerry Estrada, and Killer | 1st Round four-way match in the Rey de Reyes tournament |
| 3 | Heavy Metal defeated Blue Demon, Jr., Maniaco, and May Flowers | 1st Round four-way match in the Rey de Reyes tournament |
| 4 | Héctor Garza defeated Perro Aguayo Jr., Abismo Negro, and La Parka, Jr. | 1st Round four-way match in the Rey de Reyes tournament |
| 5 | Octagón defeated El Pantera, Fuerza Guerrera, and Pentagón | 1st Round four-way match in the Rey de Reyes tournament |
| 6 | Mini Goldust, Mini Mankind, and Mini Vader defeated La Parkita, Mini Nova, and Super Muñequito | Six-man "Lucha Libre rules" tag team match |
| 7 | Latin Lover defeated Heavy Metal, Héctor Garza and Octagón | Four-way match in the Rey de Reyes tournament final |

=== Tournament bracket ===
1st Round; Sin Limite: Rey de Reyes; February 21, 1997 (Aired: March 24)
Jerry Estrada | —
Latin Lover | Win
Máscara Sagrada Jr. | —
Killer | —
Blue Demon Jr. | —
Heavy Metal | Win
Maniaco | —
May Flowers | —
Abismo Negro | —
Hector Garza | Win
La Parka Jr. | —
Perro Aguayo Jr. | —
El Pantera | —
Fuerza Guerrera | —
Octagón | Win
Pentagón | —

Final; Sin Limite: Rey de Reyes; February 21, 1997 (Aired: March 24)
Latin Lover | Win
Heavy Metal | —
Hector Garza | —
Octagón | —
