= Triplemanía III-B =

1995 Lucha Libre AAA World Wide event

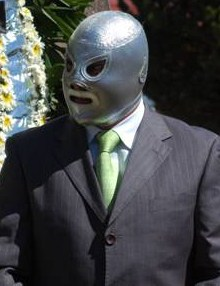
- El Hijo del Santo, teamed with Octagón, Rey Misterio, Jr. and La Parka in the fifth match of the night
- Promotion: Asistencia Asesoría y Administración
- Date: June 18, 1995 (aired June 18, 1995 (PPPV); July 8, 1995 (Main event))
- City: Tonalá, Jalisco, Mexico
- Venue: Río Nilo Coliseum
- Attendance: 19,500

Triplemanía chronology
← Previous; III-A	Next → III-C

Triplemanía III-B was the second part of the third Triplemanía professional wrestling show promoted by Asistencia Asesoría y Administración (AAA). 1995 was second year to feature the "Triplemanía Series" of shows with 3, referred to as III-A, III-B and III-C, where this was the second of the series. The show took place on June 18, 1995 in Tonala, Mexico. The Main event featured a Best two out of three falls Lucha de Apuestas "Mask vs. Mask" match where both Winners and Marabunta put their mask on the line.

== Production ==
=== Background ===
In early 1992 Antonio Peña was working as a booker and storyline writer for Consejo Mundial de Lucha Libre (CMLL), Mexico's largest and the world's oldest wrestling promotion, and was frustrated by CMLL's very conservative approach to professional wrestling, specifically the style of wrestling known as Lucha Libre (Spanish for "freestyle wrestling"). He joined forced with a number of younger, very talented wrestlers who felt like CMLL was not giving them recognition they deserved and decided to split from CMLL to create Asistencia Asesoría y Administración (AAA, or Triple A; Spanish for "Assistance, Consulting, and Administration"). After making a deal with the Televisa television network AAA held their first show in April, 1992. The following year Peña and AAA held their first Triplemanía event, building it into an annual event that would become AAA's Super Bowl event, similar to the WWE's WrestleMania being the biggest show of the year. The 1995 Triplemanía was the third year in a row AAA held a Triplemanía show and the sixth overall show under the Triplemanía banner.

=== Storylines ===
The Triplemanía show featured seven professional wrestling matches with different wrestlers involved in pre-existing scripted feuds, plots and storylines. Wrestlers were portrayed as either heels (referred to as rudos in Mexico, those that portray the "bad guys") or faces (técnicos in Mexico, the "good guy" characters) as they followed a series of tension-building events, which culminated in a wrestling match or series of matches.

Initial plans for the 1995 Triplemanía III series of events included a storyline where Los Gringos Locos members Eddy Guerrero and Art Barr would turn on teammate Konnan in the fall of 1994. This was supposed to turn técnico and set up a Luchas de Apuestas, or bet match, between Konnan and Art Barr where both would put their hair on the line. AAA booker Antonio Peña was hoping to actually sell out the 130,000 seat Estadio Azteca in Mexico City. The plans never came to fruition as Art Barr died suddenly on November 23, 1994 before the storyline even had a chance to start. Barr's death, coupled with the Mexican peso crisis in 1994 led to Guerrero leaving AAA to work in the United States instead and thus made a Los Gringos Locos storyline impossible to piece together. AAA still planned on making the 1995 Triplemanía III event a series of shows, spread out over several weeks, serving as the Super Bowl of AAA's year.

One of the main storylines that would highlight all three Triplemanía III shows was the ongoing storyline between two teams, the masked, young técnico team of Super Caló and Winners, fighting against therudo team known as Los Diabolicos, in this case the two masked members Marabunta and Ángel Mortal. The basic storyline centered around two the "veteran" wrestlers in Los Diabolicos getting annoyed with the fan reaction Super Caló and Winners were getting without, in their opinion, earning it by proving themselves in the ring. In the weeks prior to Triplemanía Los Diabolicos had faced off against Super Caló and Winners, often in six-man tag team match with the third Diabolic Mr. Condor against Caló, Winners and various young tecnicos. During those matches Los Diabolicos would often either steal the mask of their opponents, or rip the masks apart during their matches. This led to all four wrestlers signing a contract for a series of Lucha de Apuesta, or bet matches, where each competitor would wager their mask on the outcome of the match. In Lucha Libre a Lucha de Apuestas match is viewed as more prestigious than a championship match and is often promoted as the main event of major shows. The three match series would mean that three out of the four wrestlers would be unmasked by the time the third and final Triplemanía III match was over. At Triplemanía III-A Winners and Marabunta won their match, which resulted in Super Caló later pining Ángel Mortal to unmask him. The victory for Winners and Marabunta did not mean that their masks were safe, instead it meant that the two had to wrestle in the main event of TripleManía III-B under Luchas de Apuestas rules.

The first two Triplemanía III shows were supposed to take place in late April, but for reason that have not been revealed the first show had to be cancelled on the day of the event, leading to a second Triplemanía III show in Arena Rio Nilo in Guadalajara, Jalisco to be changed at the last moment. The show was changed so late in the day that the apron and posters in the arena advertised that the show was a Triplemanía show. The main event match was for the "Copa Rio Nilo", a one night special feature match between long time rivals Perro Aguayo, Konnan and Cien Caras who had been involved in a long running storyline that for Aguayo and Caras stretched back into the 1980s. During the match Cien Caras' brother, Máscara Año 2000 came to ringside and attacked Perro Aguayo, seeking revenge for being unmasked by Aguayo at Triplemanía I. At one point Máscara Año 2000 broke a glass beer bottle over Aguayo's head, causing him to bleed so badly that he had to be taken from the arena on a stretcher. In the end Cien Caras pinned Konnan setting up the team rivalry with Cien Caras and Máscara Año 2000 against Konnan and Perro Aguayo, a feud that would be featured on all three Triplemanía III shows. At TripleManía III-A Konnan, Aguayo, La Parka and Octagón defeated Cien Caras, Máscara Año 2000, Pentagón and Jerry Estrada. the victory led to a special challenge match for Triplemanía III-B, a tag team match where Cien Caras would defend the UWA "Double Power" Championship and Máscara Año 2000 would defend the IWC World Heavyweight Championship against Aguayo and Konnan, with the stipulation that if Caras was pinned in the last fall he would lose the UWA championship and if Máscara Año 2000 was pinned he would lose the IWC World Heavyweight Championship.

The opening match, a best two-out-of-three falls eight-man "Atómicos" tag team match between Perro Silva, Karloff Lagarde, Jr. and Mr. Cóndor at the team known as Las Gemas del Ring ("The Gems of the Ring"; Zafiro, Brillante, Diamante) was a rematch from April 30, 1995 where Las Gemas del Ring lost a Lucha de Apuestas match to Pero Silva, Karloff Lagarde, Jr. and Mr. Cóndor at AAA"s show Arena Rio Nilo in Guadajara.

== Aftermath ==
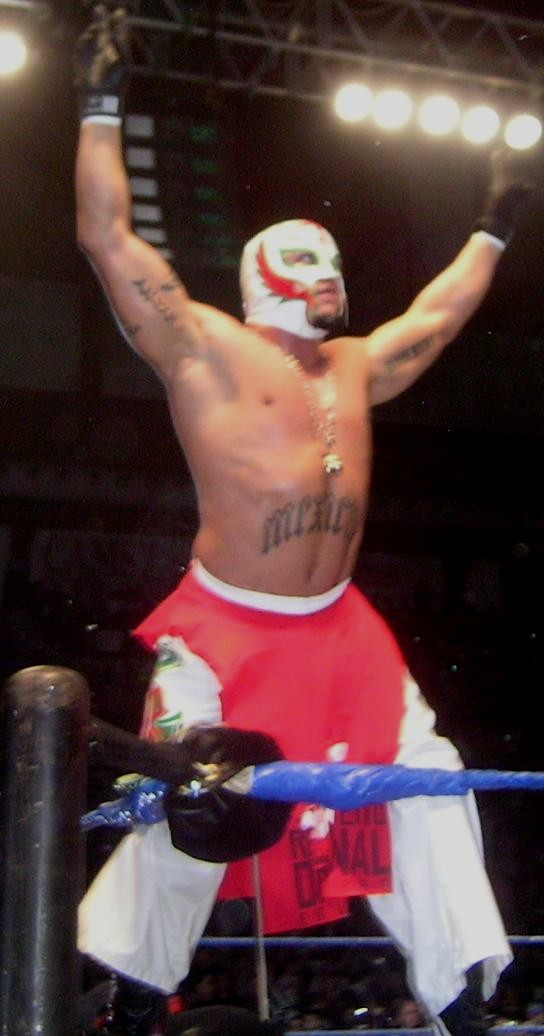
Rey Misterio Jr. on the winning side in the fifth match of the night

After both Winners and Super Caló unmasked their rivals the two partners and friends were forced to wrestle each other in the main event of the subsequent TripleManía III-C show under Lucha de Apuestas rules. Super Caló won the mask and Winners was forced to unmask and reveal his real name, Andrés Alejandro Palomeque González. After working unmasked for about a year Palomeque was given a new ring persona the following year, Abismo Negro ("The Black Abyss"), a rudo character that was the opposite of everything that Winners was.

The TripleManía III-B match represented the zenith of the storyline between Konnan and Cien Caras as well as Perro Aguayo and Máscara Año 2000, although they did face off at TripleManía III-C with Konnan, Aguayo, Latin Lover and Máscara Sagrada losing to Cien Caras, Máscara Año 2000, Fishman and Jerry Estrada in the semi-main event. Konnan would later on move to World Championship Wrestling (WCW) and work in the United States for years, putting an end to his rivalry with Cien Caras. Aguayo's rivalry with Cien Caras and Máscara Año 2000 carried on for years, even beyond Aguayo's initial retirement from wrestling as Cien Caras and Máscara Año 2000 brought him back for one more Luchas de Apuestas match as part of CMLL's 2006 Homenaje a Dos Leyendas show.

== Reception ==
John Molinario, who writes about wrestling for the Canadian Online Explorer, called the three TripleManía III shows "an outstanding TripleMania series" when reviewing the first five years of AAA's Triplemanía in a 2000 article. Dave Meltzer of the Wrestling Observer Newsletter reviewed the show in 1995, giving the Mini-Estrellas' match a Four-and-a-quarter star rating, Aguayo's debut match three-and-a-half stars, the semi-main event Atómicos match was rated at four-and-a-half stars, the double title match was given three-and-three-quarter stars and the main event Lucha de Apuestas match itself was given four-and-a-half star with Meltzer overall recommending his readers should track the matches down and watch them.

== Results ==
No.	Results	Stipulations	Times
1	Las Gemas del Ring (Zafiro, Brillante, Diamante) defeated Perro Silva, Karloff Lagarde Jr. and Mr. Cóndor	Best two-out-of-three falls six-man "lucha libre rules" tag team match	09:39
2	Los Destructores (Tony Arce, Vulcano, Rocco Valente), May Flowers, and Pimpinela Escarlata defeated Los Power Raiders (Power Raider Rojo, Power Raider Blanco, Power Raider Verde, Power Raider Negro and Power Raider Azur)	Best two-out-of-three falls ten-man elimination tag team match	09:37
3	Torerito, Super Muñequito, Octagoncito and Mascarita Sagrada defeated Fuercita Guerrera, La Parkita, Espectrito I and Espectrito II	Best two-out-of-three falls eight-man "Atómicos" tag team match	09:32
4	Juventud Guerrera defeated Perro Aguayo Jr. by pinfall	"Olympic Rules" match	08:04
5	El Hijo del Santo, Octagón, Rey Misterio, Jr. and La Parka defeated Pentagón, Blue Panther, Psicosis and Fuerza Guerrera: Fall One: El Hijo de Santo pinned Psicosis and Octagón pinned Fuerza Guerrera; Fall Two: Pentagón pinned Octagon; Fall Three: El Hijo del Santo pinned Blue Panther and Rey Misterio Jr. pinned Pentagón	Best two-out-of-three falls eight-man Atómicos tag team match	19:58
6	Cien Caras (C - UWA) and Máscara Año 2000 (C - IWC) defeated Perro Aguayo and Konnan: Fall One: Perro Aguayo was pinned and Konnan submitted; Fall Two: Perro Aguayo pinned Mascara Año 2000, Cien Caras pinned Perro Aguayo, and Konnan forced Cien Caras to submit; Fall Three: Konnan pinned Cien Caras, Mascaras Año 2000 pinned Konnan, and Perro Aguayo was disqualified	Best two-out-of-three falls tag team match for the UWA "Copa Double Power" and IWC World Heavyweight Championship	27:39
7	Winners defeated Marabunta: Fall One: Marabunta forced Winners to submit (1-0); Fall Two: Winners pinned Marabunta (1-1); Fall Three: Winners forced Marabunta to submit (2-1)	Best two-out-of-three falls Lucha de Apuestas "Mask vs. Mask" match.	23:26
