= Mini Histeria =

Mexican professional wrestler

Personal information
- Born: Rolando Fuentes Romero; May 5, 1982 (age 44) Veracruz, México

Professional wrestling career
- Ring name(s): Mini Clown; Mini Histeria; Rocky Marvin
- Billed height: 1.58 m (5 ft 2 in)
- Billed weight: 68 kg (150 lb)
- Trained by: Rocco Marvin; Histeria; Gran Apache
- Debut: April 7, 1996

Rolando Fuentes Romero (born May 5, 1982) is a Mexican professional wrestler, better known under the ring name Mini Histeria. Fuentes works for Lucha Libre AAA Worldwide (AAA) in their Mini-Estrellas division. Fuentes is the son of professional wrestler Rocco Marvin and the brother of Ricky Marvin. He previously worked as Rocky Marvin. winning the Mexican National Mini-Estrella Championship under that name. As Mini Histeria he is part of Los Mini Vipers along with Mini Abismo Negro and Mini Psicosis. Working in the Mini division does not necessarily mean that Fuentes has dwarfism as several short professional wrestlers work in the "Mini" division, including Rolando Fuentes.

== Professional wrestling career ==
Rolando Fuentes Romero was trained for his professional wrestling career by his father Rocco Marvin, making his debut on April 7, 1996. He initially wrestled as a Mini-Estrellas known as Pequeño Cochisse, a Mascota version of Gran Cochisse. Fuentes wrestled on the Independent circuit as Pequeño Cochisse from his debut in 1996 until 1997.

=== Rocky Marvin ===
In 1997, Fuentes adopted the ring name "Rocky Mavin" patterned after his father's ring name Rocco Marvin. The name change came after the debut of Fuentes' younger brother Ricky Marvin, which initially led to people thinking he was a "Mini Ricky Marvin" character until the fact that they were brothers became public knowledge. Rocky Marvin began working for AAA in 1998, working in AAA's Mini-Estrella division as a rúdo (bad guy). He made his first appearance on a major AAA show at the 2000 Rey de Reyes event, teaming with Mini Abismo Negro and Mini Psicosis losing to La Parkita, Mascarita Sagrada 2000 and Octagoncito. During the spring of 2000, Rocky Marvin developed a feud with Octagoncito, including an unsuccessful challenge for the Mexican National Mini-Estrella Championship on April 15, 2000. On October 16, 2000 Marvin teamed up with Mini Abismo Negro and Mini Psicosis to wrestled against the trio of Mini Kabui, Mini Bestia Negra and Panchito Robles in a Lucha de Apuesta, or bet match, with the hair of each team's second was on the line. Mini Psicosis pinned Mini Kabuki, allowing their second, referee El Tirantes to shave the head of Bobby Lee.

On November 5, 2000 during a show in Monterrey, Nuevo León Marvin pinned Octagoncito to win the Mexican National Mini-Estrellas Championship. He would subsequently defeat Octagoncito in the rematch to cement his status as Minis Champion. At Triplemanía IX Marvin teamed up with Mini Abismo Negro and Espectrito only to lose to La Parkita, Mascarita Sagrada and Octagoncito. Rocky Marvin held the Mini-Estrellas championship for 274 days until losing it to Mascarita Sagrada 2000 on 6 August 2000, 2001. Over the next year Marvin kept teaming up with Mini Abismo Negro and Mini Psicosis for various Trios matches. Between 2003 and 2005 Rocky Marvin made very few appearances for AAA, not working for the promotion on a regular basis until he 2005. When he returned Marvin turned técnico (good guy), now siding with Octagoncito and others he had been wrestling against for years. On July 29, 2005 he was one of eight men in a Steel Cage match where the last wrestler in the ring would lose his mask or hair, the match also included Jerrito Estrada, Mascarita Sagrada, Mini Psicosis, Octagoncito, La Parkita, Zumbido and the eventual loser refere el Piero. At the 2005 Verano de Escandalo Marvin, Mascarita Sagrada and Octagoncito defeated Jerrito Estrada, Mini Abismo Negro and Mini Psicosis.

=== Los Mini Vipers ===
In 2007, Rolando Fuentes was given a new ring character, Mini Histeria, an enmascarado character patterned on Histeria. Fuentes was the second wrestler to work as "Mini Histeria", although the first Mini Histeria did not compete long enough to make an impact. Mini Histeria teamed up with Mini Abismo Negro and Mini Psicosis to form Los Mini Vipers. As Mini Histeria he was one of the AAA representatives who wrestled on the AAA/Pro Wrestling Noah co-promoted pay-per-view (PPV) TripleSEM, teaming with Mini Abismo Negro to lose to Mascarita Divina and Octagoncito. In late 2007 Mini Psicosis left AAA and was replaced a few months later by a new Mini Psicosis. In the summer of 2008, AAA decided to create the AAA World Mini-Estrellas Championship after the reigning Mexican National Mini-Estrellas Champion Mascarita Sagrada left AAA, taking the championship belt with him. Mini Histeria lost to the new Mascarita Sagrada in the first round. On December 11, 2009 Mini Histeria was one of nine wrestlers who participated in a Battle Royal for the AAA World Minis title at Guerra de Titanes (2009). Mini Histeria was the seventh man eliminated, ousted before his Los Mini Vipers teammate Mini Abismo Negro won the title. In May, 2010 AAA announced that they were planning to hold the first ever Mini-Estrellas Tables, Ladders, and Chairs match at Triplemanía XVIII where Mini Abismo Negro would defend the title against six challengers, including Mini Histeria. In the weeks leading up to the event Mini Abismo Negro, Mini Histeria and Mini Psicosis defeated Mascarita Divina, Mini Charly Manson and Octagoncito in a match that featured the use of both tables, ladders and chairs to preview the Triplemanía XVIII match. At Triplemanía XVIII Octagoncito outlasted eight other wrestlers (La Parkita and Mini Chessman were late additions to the match) in the TLC match to become the new AAA Mini-Estrellas Champion. In July 2011, Fuentes, as Rocky Marvin, took part in Pro Wrestling Noah's 2011 Nippon TV Cup Jr. Heavyweight Tag League, teaming with his brother Ricky Marvin. After one victory and three losses, the team finished last in their block of the tournament.

== Championships and accomplishments ==
- AAA
  - Mexican National Mini-Estrella Championship (1 time)
