= Super Muñequito =

Mexican professional wrestler

Personal information
- Born: October 28, 1966 (age 59) San Luis Potosí, San Luis Potosí, Mexico

Professional wrestling career
- Ring name(s): Aguilita Solitaria; Angelito Azteca; Super Muñequito; Mini Super Astro
- Debut: 1989
- Retired: 2012

Super Muñequito (born October 26, 1966, in San Luis Potosí, San Luis Potosí, Mexico) is the most well known ring name of a retired Mexican professional wrestler. He started his career under the name Aguilita Solitaria and then later Angelito Azteca before adopting his most well known moniker, a Mini-Estrella version of Super Muñeco. Starting in 2010 he began working as Mini Super Astro. While he has been working in the Mini-Estrella division his entire career, it does not necessarily mean that he has dwarfism as several short professional wrestlers work in the "Mini" division as well, which is what separates the Mexican Mini-Estrella from traditional Midget wrestling as practiced in the United States among other places.

== Professional wrestling career ==
The wrestler who would later become known as Super Muñequito made his wrestling debut in 1989, promoted by the creation of the Mini-Estrellas division in Empresa Mexicana de Lucha Libre (EMLL), where they pioneered the idea of mascot wrestlers, smaller version of high-profile wrestlers who worked for the company. Originally Mini-Estrella division creator Antonio Peña intended for him to be a smaller version of Rayo de Jalisco Jr.

=== Aguilita Solitaria (1989–1992) ===
When he finally made his in-ring debut it was under the name "Aguilita Solitaria" ("Little Lone Eagle"), a smaller version of Águila Solitaria instead. One of his earliest recorded matches was at the EMLL 56th Anniversary Show, EMLL's biggest show of the year, where he teamed up with Fuercita Guerrera and Mascarita Sagrada to defeat Espectrito, Pequeño Goliath and Piratita Morgan on the under card. In 1990 EMLL sent him to Puerto Rico to work a match on World Wrestling Council's 17th Anniversary show, teaming with Mascarita Sagrada in a loss to Espectrito and Piratita Morgan. Back in Mexico the Minis division was represented at the EMLL 57th Anniversary Show as well, with a match where Pequeno Cobarde, Mascarita Sagrada and Aguilita Solitaria defeated Piratita Morgan, MS-1/2, and Espectrito. With the success of the Mini-Estrellas division EMLL, which had been renamed Consejo Mundial de Lucha Libre (CMLL) only months earlier, created the CMLL World Mini-Estrella Championship. In the tournament to determine the first champion Aguilita Solitaria lost to eventual tournament winner Mascarita Sagrada.

=== Angelito Azteca (1992–1993) ===
In the summer of 1992 a large number of wrestlers chose to leave CMLL, following Antonio Peña as he struck out on his own and created a new professional wrestling promotion called Asistencia Asesoría y Administración (AAA). Most of the Minis division left with Peña, including the wrestler known as Aguilita Solitaria. With CMLL owning the rights to the name he was given a new character, Angelito Azteca ("Little Aztec Angel"), based on Ángel Azteca Jr. who presented a character similar to Águila Solitaria. As Angelito Azteca he often teamed with Mascarita Sagrada and Octagoncito on early AAA shows.

=== Super Muñequito (1993–2000) ===
1993 saw a masked wrestler known as Super Muñeco (Super Doll) become very popular in AAA due to his comedic style and kid friendly clown character and it was decided to create Super Muñequito, a smaller version of the wrestling doll. The former Angelito Azteca was given the character and made his debut in 1993, On August 23, 1994, Super Muñequito defeated Fuercita Guerrera to win the Mexican National Mini-Estrella Championship. The popularity of the Minis division, led to them being in the main event of Triplemania III-A, AAA's biggest show of the year. The match saw 13 Mini-Estrellas compete in a Steel cage match where the last wrestler in the cage would be forced to unmask. After Bandita, Espectrito I, Espectrito II, Jerrito Estrada, Fuercita Guerrera, Mascarita Sagrada, Mini Calo, Octagoncito, La Parkita, Payasito Azul and Torerito all left the cage it was down to Super Muñequito and Payasito Rojo in the cage, with Super Muñequito winning the mask, forcing Payasito to unmask. Super Muñequito also worked Triplemania III-B, where he, Toerito, Octagoncito and Mascarita Sagrada defeated Fuercita Guerrera, La Parkita, Espectrito I and II. Closing out the TripleMania season at Triplemania III-C where he teamed up with Mascarita Sagrada and Octagoncito to defeat Jerito Estrada, Fuercita Guerrera and Espectrito. Following his summer success Super Muñequito became a double champion on July 8, 1995, when he defeated Espectrito to win the IWC World Mini-Estrellas Championship, a title that would be unified with the Mexican title he already held. At the following year's Triplemania IV-C Super Muñequito, Máscarita Sagráda Jr. and Mini Frisbee defeated La Parkita, and Espectrito I and Espectrito II in the third match of the night. On July 26, 1996, Super Muñequito's reign as the Mexican National Mini-Estrella Champion came to an end when Espectrito I defeated him to end the 703-day-long run with the title. He made his last appearance at a major AAA show on February 21, 1997, at their annual Rey de Reyes show, teaming with La Parkita and Mini Nova only to lose to Mini Goldust, Mini Mankind and Mini Vader. After the year 2000 Super Muñequito does not have a lot of recorded matches, which meant that he either retired from wrestling or worked under a different masked or unmasked identity. Since Super Muñequito has not referenced any other ring names and due to the secrecy of the true identities of masked wrestlers in Lucha Libre it is impossible to determine if he indeed did retire from wrestling between 2000 and 2011 where he worked as Super Muñequito on a few shows.

=== Mini Super Astro (2007–present) ===
In 2012 he returned to the ring working as part of Voladorcito's touring group of Mini-Estrellas, working as Mini Super Astro, a smaller version of Super Astro. On December 2, 2012, he teamed up with Mini Batista and Mini Rey Cometa on an International Wrestling Revolution Group (IWRG) show, losing to the team of Mini Espiritu, Mini Piratita Morgan Jr. and Mini Psicosis. He would later split his time between working as Mini Super Astro and Super Muñequito.

== Championships and accomplishments ==
- Asistencia Asesoría y Administración

- IWC World Mini-Estrella Championship (1 time)
- Mexican National Mini-Estrella Championship (1 time)

== Luchas de Apuestas record ==
Winner (wager)	Loser (wager)	Location	Event	Date	Notes
Super Muñequito (mask)	Payasito Rojo (mask)	Orizaba, Veracruz	Triplemanía III-A	June 10, 1995	(Note: Steel cage match that also included Espectrito I, Espectrito II, Jerrito Estrada, Fuercita Guerrera, Mascarita Sagrada, Mini Calo, Ninjita, Octagoncito, La Parkita, Payasito Azul and Torerito.)
