= Espectrito II =

Mexican professional wrestler (1975–2009)

- Alejandro Jiménez working as the masked Espectrito alter ego

Personal information
- Born: Alejandro Pérez Jiménez; May 15, 1975 Tetla de la Solidaridad, Tlaxcala, Mexico
- Died: June 29, 2009 (aged 34) Mexico City, Mexico
- Family: Alberto (twin brother), Mario, 2 brothers

Professional wrestling career
- Ring name(s): Guerrorito del Futuro; Espectrito II; Mini Mankind; Tarantula; Mini Black Cat
- Billed height: 1.40 m (4 ft 7 in)
- Trained by: Espectrito
- Debut: 1994

Alejandro Pérez Jiménez (May 15, 1975 – June 29, 2009) was a Mexican professional wrestler, who worked mainly under the name Espectro II. Alejandro's twin brother, Alberto, was also a midget professional wrestler who worked under the name "La Parkita", Alejandro had another brother, Mario Pérez Jiménez who worked as Espectrito. Alejandro was most known for working for Mexican professional wrestling promotions Asistencia Asesoría y Administración (AAA), International Wrestling Revolution Group (IWRG), the Mexican independent circuit as well as working for the World Wrestling Federation (WWF) where he was billed as "Mini Mankind", a miniature version of Mankind. Alejandro and his twin brother were both killed on June 29, 2009, in a double murder.

== Professional wrestling career ==
After being trained by his older brother Mario, who wrestles as Espectrito, and twin brother Alberto, who wrestled as La Parkita, Alejandro made his professional wrestling debut in 1994. Due to his family connection Alejandro made his debut for Asistencia Asesoría y Administración (AAA) and was given the ring name "Espectrito II" (Spanish for "Little Specter II") and teamed up with his older brother. On June 10, 1995, Espectrito II was one of the 13 Minis who participated in the main event of Triplemanía III-A, a multi-man Luchas de Apuestas, or bet match, where each participant put their mask on the line. Espectrito II managed to save his mask while Payasito Rojo was unmasked after the match. Eight days later Espectrito I was on the losing side of an eight-mini match at Triplemanía III-B; the match saw the team of Torerito, Super Muñequito, Octagoncito and Mascarita Sagrada defeat Espectrito I, II, Fuercita Guerrera and La Parkita. A year later the Pérez Jiménez brothers lost to Máscarita Sagráda Jr., Super Muñequito and Mini Frisbee at Triplemanía IV-C.

In 1997 AAA started a talent exchange program with the World Wrestling Federation (WWF) and as a part of that arrangement AAA sent a number of their Minis to work for the WWF. Since the WWF audience did not know any of the minis it was decided to repackage almost all AAA minis, Alejandro Pérez Jiménez was no exception as he was repackaged as "Mini Mankind", a miniature version of Mankind who worked for the WWF as a heel (bad guy) at the time. Alejandro would often team with his older brother who worked as "Mini Vader", a mini version of Vader who teamed with Mankind at the time. Alejandro made his debut as Mini Mankind on January 18, 1997, teaming with Histeria to defeat Mascarita Sagrada Jr. and Venum on an episode of WWF Shotgun Saturday Night. The repackaged minis also made an appearance on AAA's annual Rey de Reyes show where Mini Mankind, Mini Vader and Mini Goldust defeated Mini Nova, Super Muñequito and La Parkita (a new wrestler had taken over the gimmick by then). Four months later, at Triplemanía V-A, Mini Mankind, Mini Goldust and Pentagoncito lost to La Parkita (II) and Octagoncito. By the fall of 1997 all of the AAA minis had been repackaged once more, replacing the miniature versions of regular-sized wrestlers with unique characters. Alejandro Pérez Jiménez was repackaged as "Tarantula". Alejandro, as Tarantula, made a Pay-Per-View appearance for the WWF, teaming with Battalion and El Torrito (his brother Mario under a new name) losing their match against the team of Mini Nova, Max Mini and Mosaic at the 1998 Royal Rumble. By March 1998 the working agreement between AAA and the WWF ended with all the minis returning to Mexico. Not long after the agreement ended Alejandro Pérez Jiménez and Mario Mejía Jiménez left AAA, opting to work on the Mexican independent circuit under their "Espectrito" personas. While Alejandro Pérez Jiménez worked as "Mini Mankind" in 1997 and 1998, he did not play the role when the ring persona was brought back during a 2008 World Wrestling Entertainment show. The role was played by an unidentified American midget wrestler.

== Death ==
Alejandro Pérez Jiménez, along with his twin brother Alberto, were found murdered on June 29, 2009. It was reported that the two brothers checked into a hotel after a Sunday night show. Allegedly two female prostitutes approached the wrestlers, and were invited back to their hotel room. There the two women spiked the men's drinks with what was believed to be eye drops mixed in with alcohol. When the two brothers passed out, the two women, allegedly part of a group named La Filtracion, robbed them of their wallets and cell phones. The Jiménez twins died from the drugs added to their drinks. Usually this procedure does not kill the victims of the La Filtracion women, but the size of the victims played a part in their death. On July 22, 2009, it was reported that the Mexican police arrested one of the two women suspected in the death of the Jiménez twins. Police traced the whereabouts of the woman by tracking one of the Jiménez' twins cell phone which she used. The woman admitted to going to the hotel room with the Pérez Jiménez twins but denied being involved in their death. On August 12, 2009, Mexican police arrested the second suspect, tracking her down in Hidalgo and arrested her. The second suspect admitted to being at the crime scene but maintained that it was her accomplice that administered the drugs that killed Alejandro and Alberto Pérez Jiménez. The two women were later found guilty and, on July 12, 2010, sentenced to 47 years in prison.

The story of the Jiménez twins' murder was the subject of an episode of Tabloid with Jerry Springer that shows a dramatized version of the events including an interview with their mother Maria Elena Jiménez and brother Juan Jiménez. The episode revealed that Alberto was starting to become involved with local politics, but did not reveal any actual links between their death and Alberto's political aspirations.

== Luchas de Apuestas record ==
| Winner (wager) | Loser (wager) | Location | Event | Date | Notes |
|---|---|---|---|---|---|
| Octagoncito (mask) | Espectrito II (mask) | Ciudad Madero, Tamaulipas | Live event | July 28, 1997 | |

== See also ==
- List of premature professional wrestling deaths
