= Tzuki =

Mexican professional wrestler

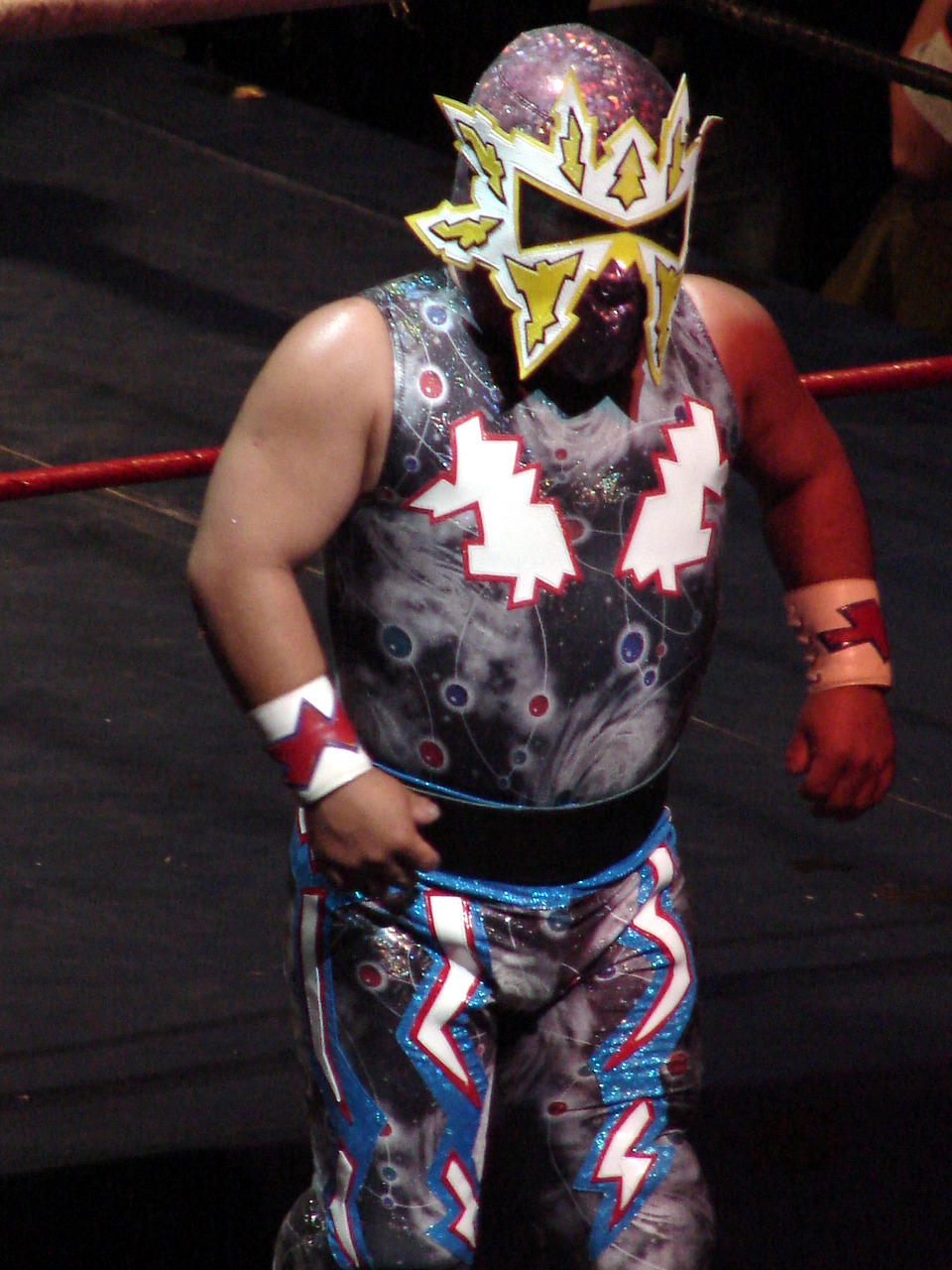

Personal information
- Born: December 31, 1974 (age 51) Veracruz, Veracruz, Mexico

Professional wrestling career
- Ring name(s): Baby Rabbit; Máscarita Sagrada Jr. Max Mini; Mini Dragon; Mini Rey Misterio Jr. Venezia; Ultimonito; Tzuki
- Billed height: 1.10 m (3 ft 7 1/2 in)
- Billed weight: 42 kg (93 lb)
- Trained by: Furia Guerrera; El Gallo; El Aventurero
- Debut: 1994

Tzuki (sometimes spelled Tsuki or Tzuky) is a Mexican professional wrestler, who works as a Mini-Estrella or "Mini" division in Mexico. Throughout his career Tzuki has worked under various ring names, most notably Máscarita Sagrada Jr., Mini Rey Misterio Jr. and Max Mini. Tzuki has worked for (AAA), the World Wrestling Federation (WWF) and a variety of special appearances for independent promotions all over Mexico, the United States, Japan, Europe and currently works for Consejo Mundial de Lucha Libre (CMLL). Tsuky's real name is not a matter of public record, as is often the case with masked wrestlers in Mexico where their private lives are kept a secret from the wrestling fans. While not all Mini-Estrellas in Mexico have dwarfism, Tzuki is one of the Mini-Estrellas that actually does.

== Professional wrestling career ==
=== Early Career (1994-1995) ===
The wrestler who would later be known as Tzuki trained under Furia Guerrera and El Gallo, both average sized wrestlers, preparing him for a professional wrestling career. He made his professional wrestling debut in 1994, working initially under the ring name "Baby Rabbit", wearing a full body rabbit suit while wrestling.

=== Asistencia Asesoría y Administración (1995–1997) ===
In 1995 he began working for Asistencia Asesoría y Administración (AAA), initially as Baby Rabit but in 1996 he was given the name Máscarita Sagrada Jr., a mascota version of the Luchador Máscara Sagrada Jr. The name caused some tension with both Máscara Sagrada and Mascarita Sagrada as they felt the "Junior" was exploiting a character they made popular. On July 15, 1996, Mascarita Sagrada Jr. teamed with Mini Frisbee and Super Munequito to defeat Espectrito I, Espectrito II and La Parkita (II) at Triplemanía IV-C. On September 15, 1996, Máscarita Sagrada Jr. defeated Espectrito I to win the Mexican National Mini-Estrella Championship, winning AAA's top Minis title at the time.

=== WWF and Max Mini (1997–1999) ===
In 1997, Mascarita Sagrada Jr. signed with the World Wrestling Federation (WWF) as part of their working relationship that saw several AAA wrestlers work for them. Sagrada was repackaged as "Max Mini" since Mascara Sagrada did not appear on WWF shows. The same was true for Mascarita Sagrada, who was repackaged as "Mini Nova" and Octagóncito that was repackaged as "Mosaic". Sagrada wrestled on RAW, March 17, 1997, in a minis tag team, teaming with mini Goldust versus Mini Mankind and Mini Vader. Max Mini made his in-ring debut at Ground Zero: In Your House where he faced El Torito. He later appeared at Badd Blood: In Your House where he and Mini Nova faced Tarantula and Mosaic. The match was not originally scheduled for the pay-per-view, but the originally scheduled match was cancelled as Brian Pillman was found dead earlier that day. Nova and Mini won. On November 11, 1997 the minis made an appearance on WWF Raw where Max Mini, Nova and Taurus fought Battalion, Tarantula and El Torito. The match was interrupted when Kane came to the ring and scared off the minis. Max Mini made one further PPV appearance at the 1998 Royal Rumble where Max Mini, Nova and Mosaic defeated El Torito, Tarantula and Battalion. The Minis did not appear on WWF television until the federation created their WWF Super Astros show, targeting the Latin American demographics. At first the storyline between Nova & Max Mini and El Torito & Battalion, but then the story turned towards tension building between Nova and Max Mini. They faced off in a singles match to settle their differences in the ring, but Mini Nova cheated to win the match. Subsequently Mini Nova teamed with Battalion to face Max Mini and El Torrito. Then finally on May 30, 1999 Nova faced Max Mini in a Lucha de Apuestas ("Bet fight") where both men put their masks on the line. Max Mini won and unmasked Mini Nova. Max Mini only made a few other appearances before leaving the WWF.

=== Leaving AAA ===
In 1997 then-reigning champion Mascarita Sagrada Jr. left AAA to work for Promo Azteca full-time as the two promotions stopped working together. As a result of this he was forced the vacate the Mexican National Mini-Estrella Championship and drop the Máscarita Sagrada Jr. gimmick. Instead, he began working as Mini Rey Misterio Jr., a mascota version of Rey Misterio Jr. who was also working for Promo Azteca at the time. Since he had signed a contract directly with the WWF, he was able to continue working as Max Mini and facing AAA Minis despite having left AAA. He wrestled as Mini Rey until early 1999, where he changed his ring character Venezia, wrestling in a furry full-body suit for Torymon. The Venezia gimmick did not last long, although he did return to the Venezia gimmick on May 13, 2006, for Último Dragón's first DragonMania show at Arena Mexico.

=== Tzuki (1999–present) ===
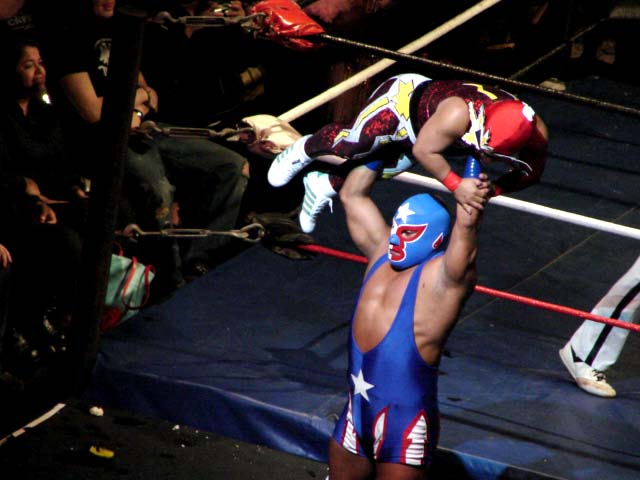
Tzuki being lifted up in the air by Pierrothito

In March 1999, he changed gimmicks to Tzuki, an masked wrestler character with lightning bolts on his mask and suit. As Tzuki he worked for various Mexican independent promotions as well as several United States based wrestling promotions, including regular appearances for the California-based Lucha VaVOOM.

In 2005 Tzuki began working for Consejo Mundial de Lucha Libre (CMLL), bolstering their Mini-Estrellas division.

Following his release by WWE he worked primarily for CMLL, although he did briefly work for Nu-Wrestling Evolution, participating in a tour from June 12 to 15, 2008, where he worked as "Mini Dragon". The NWE has featured the character Mini Dragon since then but it was a different wrestler under the mask. Tzuki was one of 13 Minis that risked their mask in a Steel Cage Luchas de Apuestas match in the main event of CMLL's La Hora Cero pay-per-view on January 11, 2009. He escaped the cage, thus keeping his mask safe.

=== Toryumon and offshoots (2001–2006) ===
In 2000, Tzuki joined Japanese professional wrestling promotion Toryumon. He debuted in its brand Toryumon 2000 Project under the gimmick of "Venezia", the pet chimpanzee of Masato Yoshino, who sported a wild child gimmick himself. Under this character, Tzuki wore a full body monkey costume and accompanied Yoshino to the ring, occasionally helping him to win matches. He also competed in sporadic wrestling matches against Stalker Ichikawa. After Yoshino joined Milano Collection AT's Italian Connection, Venezia followed him as a non-official member.

In December 2002, after Venezia defeated Ichikawa, a large man wearing a gorilla costume came to the ring and brought a mirror for Venezia to look at his own reflection. This enlightened Venezia of his animal nature and made him understand he belonged to the African jungle instead of Toryumon, so he allowed the gorilla to consolate him and accompany him out of the arena. It was thought to be his last appearance in the promotion, but the same night the gorilla was revealed to be a disguised Don Fujii, who had kidnapped Venezia in order to impede him from helping Italian Connection to win against Fujii's faction Crazy Max. After the incident, Venezia returned to Yoshino's side, being stated he had been found in the Ueno Zoo.

In 2003, Italian Connection split up when its member Yassini attacked Venezia for failing to help in a match, as well as Yoshino, who had tried to help his pet. Venezia followed Yoshino as a single wrestler, but this ended when K-ness won Venezia's property in a match against Yoshino and Don Fujii. K-ness humorously mistreated Venezia and forced him to dance on the entrance of K-ness's superior Magnum Tokyo, among other humiliating acts. The same year, Tzuki was released from his contract by Toryumon.

Tzuki returned as Venezia for Dragondoor, a promotion formed in 2005 by former Toryumon system wrestlers who had not joined Dragon Gate. He was now the mascot of Taiji Ishimori's faction, which included Milanito Collection at, Little Dragon and Kota Ibushi. He also relived his feud with Yassini, now named Yasshi, who introduced another monkey midget wrestler named Genova in order to oppose Venezia. Dragondoor lasted until 2006 before folding.

=== Return to WWE (2005-2006) ===
He also began working for World Wrestling Entertainment (WWE; Formerly the WWF) in their Junior division. The Junior division was created in October 2005 and was exclusive to the WWE's SmackDown brand. Tzuki only made one wrestling appearance on the actual SmackDown show, a tag team match where he teamed with Mascarita Sagrada to take on Octagoncito and Pequeño Violencia. The match ended in a no contest after interference from Finlay using the mini stars to make a point. On February 21, 2006, Tzuki lost to Mascarita Sagrada in a singles match taped for WWE Velocity. By March 2006 the WWE gave up on the Juniors division and released all the mini wrestlers including Tzuki.

== Championships and accomplishments ==
- Asistencia Asesoría y Administración
  - Mexican National Mini-Estrella Championship (1 time)

== Lucha de Apuesta record ==
Winner (wager)	Loser (wager)	Location	Event	Date	Notes
Max Mini (mask)	Mini Nova (mask)	Laredo, Texas	WWF Super Astros	June 20, 1999	
Tzuki (mask)	Espectrito (hair)	Tijuana, Baja California	Live event	September 29, 2000	
Tzuki (mask)	Sexy Leoncito (hair)	San Luis Potosí, San Luis Potosí	Live event	July 22, 2001	
Tzuki (mask)	Piratita Morgan (hair)	Tijuana, Baja California	Live event	August 17, 2003	
