= Mexican National Mini-Estrella Championship =

Professional wrestling championship

- The front plate of the championship belt

Details
- Promotion: Asistencia Asesoría y Administración / AAA
- Date established: 1992
- Date retired: June 21, 2007

Other name
- Mexican National Minis Championship
Statistics
- First champion: Espectrito (Note: Duncan & Will (2000) p. 401 "Espectrito I 1993/01/08 Queretaro")
- Final champion: Mascarita Sagrada 2000 (Note: Lucha 2000 Especial 21 (December 20, 2004) p. 13 "Mascarita Sagrada 2000 5 noviembre 2004")
- Most reigns: Mascarita Sagrada; Espectrito; Octagoncito II; Mascarita Sagrada 2000; (2 Reigns)
- Longest reign: Mascarita Sagrada 2000 (958 days)
- Shortest reign: Jerrito Estrada (26 days) (Note: Duncan & Will (2000) p. 401 "Jerrito Estrada 1994/02/04 Cuernavaca") (Note: Duncan & Will (2000) p. 401 "Mascarita Sagrada [2] 1993/04/16 Mexico City")
- Oldest champion: Espectro I (29 years, 221 days) (Note: Sorted by age, youngest to oldest: 1. Rocky Marvin – 18 years, 184 days; 2. Mascarita Sagrada 2000 – 19 years, 168 days; 3. Octagoncito – 19 years, 335 days; 4. Tzuki – 22 years, 258 days; 5. Mascarita Sagrada 2000 – 22 years, 260 days; 6. Mini Abismo Negro – 23 years, 350 days; 7. Octagoncito II – 25 years, 94 days; 8. Espectro I – 26 years, 21 days (Note: Madigan (2007), chapter: You ain't seen nothing yet: the minis, pps 209–212); 9. Octagoncito II – 27 years, 12 days; 10. Mini Abismo Negro – 27 years, 72 days; 11. Jerrito Estrada – 27 years, 252 days; 12. Super Munequito – 27 years, 299 days; 13. Mascarita Sagrada – 28 years, 95 days; 14. Espectro I – 29 years, 221 days; 15. Fuercita Guerrera – undocumented)
- Youngest champion: Rocky Marvin – (18 years, 184 days)
- Heaviest champion: Mini Abismo Negro (75 kilograms (165 lb)) (Note: Sorted by weight, lightest to heaviest: 1. Tzuki – 40 kilograms (88 lb); 2. Mascaria Sagrada – 42 kilograms (93 lb); 3. Octagoncito – 46 kilograms (101 lb); 4. Mascarita Sagrada 2000 – 50 kilograms (110 lb); 5. Octagoncito II – 62 kilograms (137 lb); 6. Espectro I – 65 kilograms (143 lb); 7. Rocky Marvin – 68 kilograms (150 lb); 8. Mini Abismo Negro – 75 kilograms (165 lb); 9. Jerrito Estrada – Undocumented; 10. Fuercita Guerrera – Undocumented; 11. Super Munequito – Undocumented)
- Lightest champion: Mascarita Sagrada Jr. (40 kilograms (88 lb))

The Mexican National Mini-Estrella Championship (Campeonato Nacional Mini-Estrella in Spanish), also referred to as the Mexican National Minis Championship, is an inactive professional wrestling championship sanctioned by Comisión de Box y Lucha Libre Mexico D.F. (Mexico City Boxing and Wrestling Commission). While the commission sanctioned the title, it did not promote the events at which the championship was defended. Asistencia Asesoría y Administración (AAA) promoted the events and had the everyday control of the championship. (Note: In this context, "control" refers to the everyday use of the championship, determining which storylines the championship is being used in, who gets to challenge for it and how to use it in a public relations sense.) The championship was exclusively for wrestlers in the Mini-Estrellas, or Minis, division. A "Mini" is not necessarily a person with dwarfism, as in North American Midget wrestling; wrestlers who do not have dwarfism but are very short also work in the Mini-Estrellas division. (Note: Madigan (2007), pp.209: "They invited some of the wrestlers of smaller physical stature south of the border to work.") As it was a professional wrestling championship, it was not won legitimately; it was instead won via a scripted ending to a match or awarded to a wrestler because of a storyline. (Note: Hornbaker (2016) p. 550: "Professional wrestling is a sport in which match finishes are predetermined. Thus, win–loss records are not indicative of a wrestler's genuine success based on their legitimate abilities - but on now much, or how little they were pushed by promoters") All title matches took place under two out of three falls rules. (Note: Comisión de Box y Lucha Libre p. 44 "Articulo 258.- Cada combate de lucha libre tendrá como limite tres caídas; cada caída será sin limite de tiempo, ganará quien obtenga dos caídas de las tres en disputa" ("Article 258.- Each wrestling match shall have as limit three falls; Each fall will be without time limit. The winner will be the one to first obtain two of the three falls in the match"))

The championship was introduced in January 1993, (Note: Duncan & Will (2000), chapter "Mexico: National Midget (miniestrella) title, p. 401) to be used as the top championship in AAA's newly created Mini-Estrella division. Espectrito won a match against Mascarita Sagrada; Mascarita Sagrada had been the CMLL World Mini-Estrellas Champion when Antonio Peña left Consejo Mundial de Lucha Libre (CMLL) to create AAA and was initially offered the championship without a match; Sagrada declined, opting to face Espectrito in a match to decide who would become the first champion instead. In 1995 then-reigning champion Super Muñequito defeated Espectrito to win the IWC World Mini-Estrella Championship, merging it with the Mexican National title. (Note: IWC stood for "International Wrestling Council", a name used to Promote AAA in the United States between 1994 and 1995.) (Note: Duncan & Will (2000) p. 401 "International World Minis Championship") In 1997 then-reigning champion Mascarita Sagrada Jr. left AAA to work for Promo Azteca; he vacated the title and changed his name to "Tzuki". Octagoncito II defeated Pentagoncito to win the vacant title. (Note: Duncan & Will (2000) p. 401 "AAA Octagoncito 1997/07/26 Tulancingo Defeats Pentagoncito.") In 2007, Mascarita Sagrada 2000 left AAA for rival promotion CMLL, while still holding the championship.

AAA replaced the championship with the AAA World Mini-Estrella Championship in 2008. The first Mini-Estrella champion, Espectrito, was one of three wrestlers to hold the championship twice, the others being Octagoncito II and Mascarada Sagrada 2000. There was a total of 15 championship reigns shared by 11 wrestlers. Mascarita Sagrada 2000 has the longest individual championship reign at 958 days, as well the longest combined reigns at 1,867 days. (Note: Lucha 2000 Especial 21 (December 20, 2004) p. 13 "Mascarita Sagrada 2000 6 augusto 2001 ") Jerrito Estrada's 26-day reign was the shortest.

== Title history ==
Key
No.	Overall reign number
Reign	Reign number for the specific champion
Days	Number of days held

No.	Champion	Championship change			Reign statistics		Notes	Ref.
No.	Champion	Date	Event	Location	Reign	Days	Notes	Ref.
Asistencia Asesoría y Administración (AAA)
1	Espectrito	January 8, 1993	AAA Live event	Querétaro	1	98	Defeated Mascarita Sagrada to win the vacant title	
2	Mascarita Sagrada	April 16, 1993	AAA Sin Limite	Mexico City	1	294		
3	Jerrito Estrada	February 4, 1994	AAA Live event	Cuernavaca	1	26		
4	Octagoncito	March 26, 1994	AAA Sin Limite	Mérida, Yucatán	1	112		(Note: Duncan & Will (2000) p. 401 "Octagoncito 1994/03/26 Merida")
5	Fuercita Guerrera	July 16, 1994	AAA Live event	Mexico City	1	38		(Note: Duncan & Will (2000) p. 401 "Fuercita Guerrera 1994/07/16 Mexico City")
6	Super Muñequito	August 23, 1994	AAA Live event	Zacatecas	1	703		(Note: Duncan & Will (2000) p. 401 "Super Muñequito 1994/08/23 Zacatecas")
7	Espectrito	July 26, 1996	AAA Sin Limite	Actopan, Hidalgo	2	50		(Note: Duncan & Will (2000) p. 401 "Espectrito I [2] 1996/07/26 Actopan")
8	Mascarita Sagrada Jr.	September 14, 1996	AAA Live event	Orizaba	1	(Note: The exact date on which the title was vacated is not known, which means the title reign lasted between 109 and 314 days.)		(Note: Duncan & Will (2000) p. 401 "Mascarita Sagrada Jr. 1996/09/14 Orizaba")
—	Vacated	1997	—	—	—	—	Championship vacated when Mascarita Sagrada Jr. left the promotion.	(Note: Duncan & Will (2000) p. 401 "Vacant when Sagrada jumps to Promo Azteca.")
9	Octagoncito II	July 26, 1997	AAA Live event	Tulancingo	1	314	Octagoncito defeated Pentagoncito to win the vacant title.	
10	Mini Abismo Negro	June 5, 1998	AAA Live event	Fresnillo, Zacatecas	1	334		(Note: Duncan & Will (2000) p. 401 "Mini Abismo Negro 1998/06/05 Fresnillo, Zacateca")
11	Octagoncito II	May 5, 1999	AAA Live event	Tecamac	2	550		(Note: Duncan & Will (2000) p. 401 "AAA Octagoncito [2] 1999/05/05 Tecamac")
12	Rocky Marvin	November 5, 2000	AAA Live event	Monterrey	1	274		(Note: Lucha 2000 Especial 21 (December 20, 2004) p. 13 "Rocky Marvin")
13	Mascarita Sagrada 2000	August 6, 2001	AAA Live event	León, Guanajuato	1	909		
14	Mini Abismo Negro	February 1, 2004	AAA Sin Limite	Zapopan	2	278		(Note: Lucha 2000 Especial 21 (December 20, 2004) p. 13 "Mini Abismo Negro 2000 1 febrero 2004")
15	Mascarita Sagrada 2000	November 5, 2004	AAA Sin Limite	Veracruz, Veracruz	2	958		
—	Deactivated	June 21, 2007	—	—	—	—	Date of last AAA match for Mascarita Sagrada 2000	

== Reigns by combined length ==
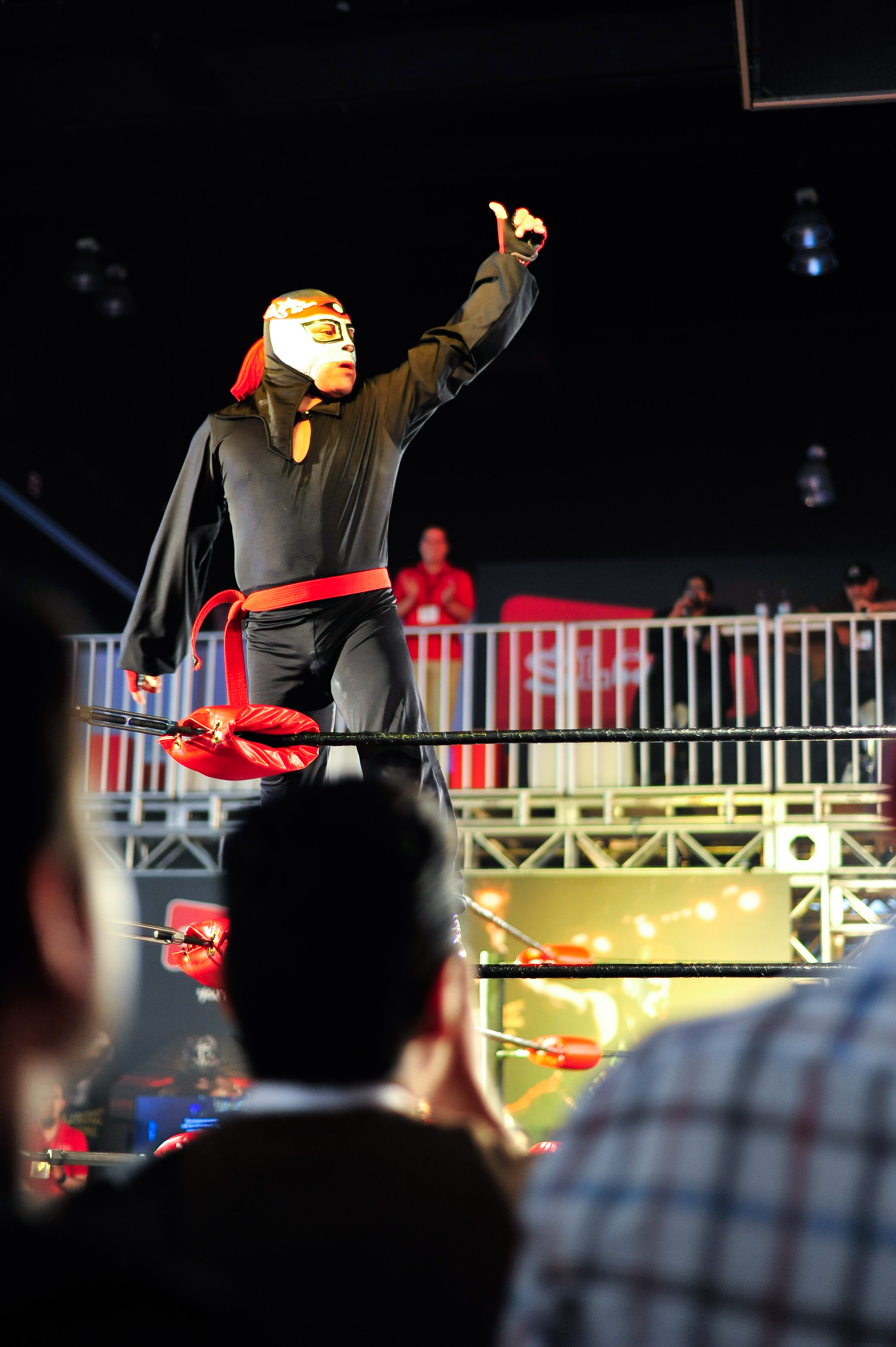
Octagoncito II, second highest number of days as a champion

Key
¤	The exact length of the title reign is uncertain; the shortest possible length is used.

Rank	Wrestler	No. of reigns	Combined days
1	Mascarita Sagrada 2000	2	1,867
2	Octagoncito II	2	864
3	Super Muñequito	1	703
4	Mini Abismo Negro	1	612
5	Mascarita Sagrada	2	295
6	Rocky Marvin	1	274
7	Espectrito	2	148
8	Octagoncito	1	112
9	Mascarita Sagrada Jr.	1	109¤
10	Fuercita Guerrera	1	38
11	Jerrito Estrada	1	26
