= Octagoncito =

Mexican professional wrestler

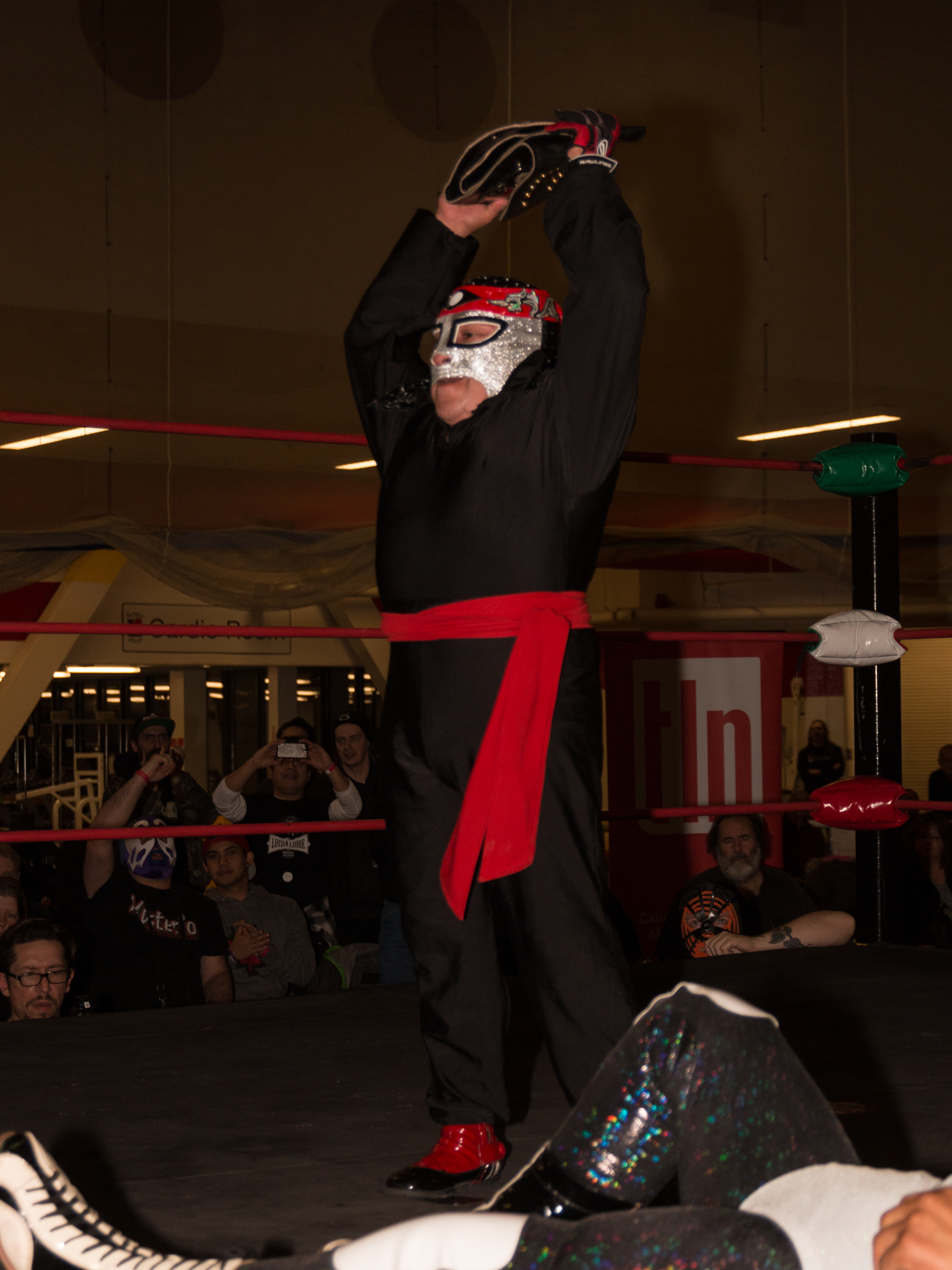
- Octagoncito in January 2016

Personal information
- Born: April 25, 1974 (age 52)
- Family: Anima (Father); Anima Jr. (Brother)

Professional wrestling career
- Ring name(s): Octagoncito; Astrito; Mosaic; Mini Chupacabra; Mini Mariachi
- Billed height: 133 cm (4 ft 4 in)
- Billed weight: 46 kg (101 lb)
- Trained by: Anima; Rayo Vengador; El Torbelino
- Debut: November 25, 1990

Octagoncito (born April 24, 1974) is a Mexican professional wrestler working in the Mini-Estrellas ("Mini-Stars") division on the Mexican Independent circuit. He is the first wrestler to work as Octagoncito, with Asistencia Asesoría y Administración (AAA) giving the same ring character to a second Octagoncito when the original one left the promotion in 1995. Octagoncito's real name is not a matter of public record, as is often the case with masked wrestlers in Mexico, where their private lives are kept a secret from the wrestling fans.

In addition to working for AAA, Octagoncito has also worked for Consejo Mundial de Lucha Libre (CMLL), Lucha Libre USA, WWE, World Championship Wrestling (WCW), New Japan Pro-Wrestling (NJPW), Impact Wrestling and a slew of smaller wrestling promotions. Working in the Mini division does not necessarily mean that Octagoncito has dwarfism, as short wrestlers can also work in the "Mini" division.

== Professional wrestling career ==
=== Consejo Mundial de Lucha Libre (1989–1992) ===
In 1989, Consejo Mundial de Lucha Libre (CMLL) created the wrestling character Octagón, a masked Mexican ninja character that immediately became very popular with the audience, especially children. When CMLL started up their Mini-Estrellas division, they created a number of mascota characters, smaller versions of their well known wrestlers, including Octagoncito, which was created to play off the popularity of the regular sized competitor. Early in his career, Octagoncito competed in the tournament to crown the first ever CMLL World Mini-Estrella Champion, losing in the second round to Espectrito.

=== AAA (1992–1995) ===
When Mini-Estrella creator Antonio Peña left CMLL in mid-1992 to form a new promotion called Asistencia Asesoría y Administración (AAA), Octagoncito and a number of other wrestlers and Mini-Estrellas left with Peña for AAA. On March 26, 1994, Octagoncito defeated Jerrito Estrada to win the Mexican National Mini-Estrella Championship. A few weeks later, on April 26, he competed in his first major AAA event, Triplemanía II-A, which was AAA's biggest show of the year. Mascarita Sagrada, Octagoncito and Super Muñequito defeated Espectrito, Jerrito Estrada and Fuercito Guerrera by disqualification. His run with the Mexican National Mini-Estrellas Championship lasted 112 days, losing it to Fuercita Guerrera on July 16. At some point in the next year or two, Octagoncito also won the IWC Mini-Estrellas Championship, although records are not clear on exactly when.

On May 31, 1995, Octagoncito won his highest profile Luchas de Apuestas ("bet match"), where he put his mask on the line against the hair of his opponent, Espectrito. Octagoncito won the match and kept his mask safe, while Espectrito was forced to be shaved bald afterwards. Octagoncito and his fellow Mini-Estrellas competed in the main event of Triplemanía III-A, a thirteen wrestler steel cage elimination match where the last person in the cage would be forced to unmask under Lucha de Apuestas rules; it included Octagoncito, Bandita, Espectrito I, Espectrito II, Jerrito Estrada, Fuercita Guerrera, Mascarita Sagrada, Mini Calo, La Parkita, Payasito Azul, Payasito Rojo, Super Muñequito and Torrerito. In the end, Payasito Rojo was forced to unmask. By late 1995, Octagoncito left AAA after a falling out with management, but took the name, the mask and the image of Octagoncito with him.

=== World Championship Wrestling (1996) ===
Octagoncito then briefly worked for World Championship Wrestling (WCW) in the United States, including a match at Starrcade on December 29, 1996, where he teamed with Mascarita Sagrada to defeat Jerrito Estrada and Piratita Morgan in a dark match before the pay-per-view portion of the show. The next night, he and Sagrada defeated them in a rematch on WCW's televised weekly show, WCW Monday Nitro.

=== WWE (1997–1998, 2006) ===
In 1997, he began working for the World Wrestling Federation (WWF) as "Mosaic", teaming with and facing off against Mini-Estrellas from AAA. His first major appearance as Mosaic at Badd Blood: In Your House on October 5, teaming with Tarantula in a loss to Max Mini and Nova. On January 18, 1998, at the Royal Rumble, Mosaic teamed with former opponents Max Mini and Nova to defeat the trio of Battalion, El Torrito and Tarantula. The WWF, now called World Wrestling Entertainment (WWE) revived their Minis division in 2006, bringing in Octagoncito as one of their competitors in the short-lived revival.

=== Independent circuit (1998–present) ===
He later returned to Mexico wrestling as Octagoncito, causing some confusion as AAA had introduced a different wrestler as Octagoncito as well. Over the years, Octagoncito worked for International Wrestling Revolution Group (IWRG), CMLL and number of special appearances for various independent wrestling promotions. On August 2, 2009, Octagoncito defeated Piratita Morgan to win the WWA World Mini-Estrellas Championship, a title he would hold for 1040 days straight, losing it to Mascarita Platita in 2011. On September 20, he defeated Espectrito to win the reactivated NWA World Minis Championship at a Pro Wrestling Revolution (PWR) show. Later on, PWR withdrew from the National Wrestling Alliance (NWA), renaming the championship the PWR World Minis Championship. In 2011 and 2012, he worked for Lucha Libre USA, appearing on both seasons of their MTV2 show, often wrestling in mixed matches against both Mini-Estrellas and women at a time against regular sized competitors as well.

=== Impact Wrestling (2017) ===
On July 6, 2017, it was announced that Octagoncito would make his Impact Wrestling debut the following week, where he defeated Demus.

== Championships and accomplishments ==
- Asistencia Asesoría y Administración

- IWC World Mini-Estrella Championship (1 time)
- Mexican National Mini-Estrella Championship (1 time)

- National Wrestling Alliance

- NWA World Minis Championship (1 time)

- Pro Wrestling Revolution

- PWR World Minis Championship (1 time)

- World Wrestling Association

- WWA World Minis Championship (2 times)

== Lucha de Apuesta record ==
Winner (wager)	Loser (wager)	Location	Event	Date	Notes
Octagoncito (mask)	Mazanbulita (mask)	N/A	Live event	N/A	
Octagoncito (mask)	Mini American Cat (mask)	N/A	Live event	N/A	
Octagoncito (mask)	Payasito Coco Verde	N/A	Live event	N/A	
Octagoncito (mask)	Payasito Coco Azul (mask)	N/A	Live event	N/A	
Octagoncito (mask)	Mini Esqueletor (mask)	N/A	Live event	N/A	
Octagoncito (mask)	Mini Hooligan (mask)	N/A	Live event	N/A	
Octagoncito (mask)	Espectrito I	Veracruz, Veracruz	Live event	May 31, 1995	
