= Espectrito =

Mexican professional wrestler (1966–2016)

Personal information
- Born: Mario Pérez Jiménez; December 18, 1966 Oaxaca, Oaxaca, Mexico
- Died: January 23, 2016 (aged 49)

Professional wrestling career
- Ring name(s): Centellita; Espectrito; Espectrito I Pandita Chiquita; Mini Vader; El Torito; Mongrel
- Billed height: 1.45 m (4 ft 9 in)
- Billed weight: 65 kg (143 lb)
- Trained by: Drácula III
- Debut: 1984
- Retired: 2014

Mario Pérez Jiménez (December 18, 1966 – January 23, 2016) was a Mexican professional wrestler, best known under the ring name Espectrito. Jiménez worked for the World Wrestling Federation (WWF) as "Mini Vader" and "El Torito" between 1997 and 1999. Jiménez was the first ever Mexican National Mini-Estrella Champion and IWC World Mini-Estrella Champion. Jiménez was originally an masked wrestler, under the Espectrito name but lost it to Mascarita Sagrada in a Luchas de Apuestas match, a bet match where each wrestler puts his mask on the line. The Espectrito ring character is a Mini-version of wrestler Espectro, who was a well-known professional wrestler from the 1960s-1980s.

== Professional wrestling career ==
Mario Jiménez made his professional wrestling debut in 1984 under the ring name Centellita, working as a Mini-Estrella, or "Mini", division; working in the Mini division does not necessarily mean that Jiménez has dwarfism, as short wrestlers can also work in the "Mini" division. In 1989 Jimenez became part of Empresa Mexicana de Lucha Libre's (EMLL) newly created Mini-Estrella division. He was given the ring persona of "Espectrito" (Spanish for "Little Ghost"), a mini version of a wrestler named Espectro I (Ghost) who had been very successful in the 1960s and 1970s. As Espectrito he began working a storyline feud against Mascarita Sagrada. In 1992 CMLL created the CMLL World Mini-Estrella Championship and held a one-day tournament to find the first champion. Espectrito defeated Octagoncito in the first round but lost to rival Mascarita Sagrada in the finals.

A few months after the creation of the Mini-Estrella title Antonio Peña, the creative force behind the Mini-Estrella division and a CMLL Booker decided to leave CMLL to create his own promotion, Asistencia Asesoría y Administración (AAA). Both Espectrito and Mascarita Sagrada decided to leave CMLL for AAA, staying loyal to the man that was responsible for creating the Minis division. The storyline between Espectrito and Mascarita Sagrada continued in AAA; AAA created their own Minis title, the Mexican National Mini-Estrella Championship and this time it was Espectrito who defeated Mascarita Sagrada to become the first champion. Espectrito would only hold the Minis title for three months before Sagrada defeated him for the belt. On August 6, 1994 Espectrito lost his mask as a result of losing a Luchas de Apuestas match, a "bet match" where the loser would unmask afterwards. On May 5, 1995 Espectrito defeated Mascarita Sagrada to win the IWC World Mini-Estrella Championship, holding it for two months before it was merged with the Mexican National Minis title in July, 1995 when Espectrito lost to Super Muñequito. Espectrito became a two time Mexican National Minis champion only days later when he defeated Super Muñequito for the title on July 26, 1996. Espectro's second title reign lasted less than two months, ending when Mascarita Sagarda, Jr. defeated him for the belt.

In 1997 AAA began a working agreement with the North American-based World Wrestling Federation, which meant that several AAA workers appeared on WWF television programming. Jiménez was given the ring personal "Mini Vader", a miniature version of WWF wrestler Vader as he bore a striking resemblance both physically and facially. Mini Vader made a couple of appearances in early 1997, at times teaming with "Mini Mankind", Jiménez' real life brother. In mid-1997 all the "Minis" that worked for the WWF were repackaged and Jiménez became "El Torito" (Little bull), a "human bull" character. As Torito he would work a series of matches against Mascarita Sagrada, repackaged as "Mini Nova" (after Super Nova) and Mascarita Sagrada, Jr. who had been repackaged as "Max Mini". Jiménez made one pay-per-view appearance for the WWF, teaming with Battalion and Tarantula (his brother under a new name) losing to the team of Mini Nova, Max Mini and Mosaic at the 1998 Royal Rumble. After AAA and WWF stopped working together in 1999 Jiménez still made appearances as El Torito until 2001 where he lost the mask in a Luchas de Apuestas against Pierrothito.

Between 2002 and 2003 Jiménez made regular appearances for Lucha VaVOOM, worked for over a year in CMLL and made appearances for International Wrestling Revolution Group.

He wrestled his last match in 2014.

== Personal life ==
Mario Pérez Jiménez was the brother of twins Alejandro Jiménez, who wrestled as Espectrito II, and Alberto Jiménez, who wrestled as the original La Parkita. The Jiménez twins were both murdered on June 29, 2009, in a crime that was covered worldwide.

== Death ==
Mario Pérez Jiménez died on January 23, 2016. Following his death, Dave Meltzer of the Wrestling Observer Newsletter described him as "the best working heel mini of his era and maybe ever".

== Championships and accomplishments ==
- Asistencia Asesoría y Administración (AAA)
  - Mexican National Mini-Estrella Championship (2 times)
  - IWC Mini-Estrella Championship (2 times)

== Luchas de Apuestas record ==
Winner (wager)	Loser (wager)	Location	Event	Date	Notes
Mascarita Sagrada (mask)	Espectrito (mask)	Los Angeles, California	AAA Live event	August 6, 1994	
Octagoncito (mask)	Espectrito (hair)	Veracruz, Veracruz	AA Live event	May 31, 1995	
Torerito (mask)	Espectrito II (hair)	Jalisco	Live event	December 14, 1996	
Tzuki (mask)	Espectrito I (hair)	Tijuana, Baja California	Live event	September 29, 2000	
Pierrothito (mask)	El Torito (mask)	Puebla, Puebla	CMLL Live event	November 26, 2001	(Note: This was a Relevos Suicidas: Lost to Tzuki and Ultimo Dragoncito.)
Asturiano (hair)	Espectrito I (hair)	Puebla, Puebla	Live event	July 26, 2004	

== See also ==
- List of premature professional wrestling deaths
