= Mascarita Sagrada =

Mexican professional wrestler

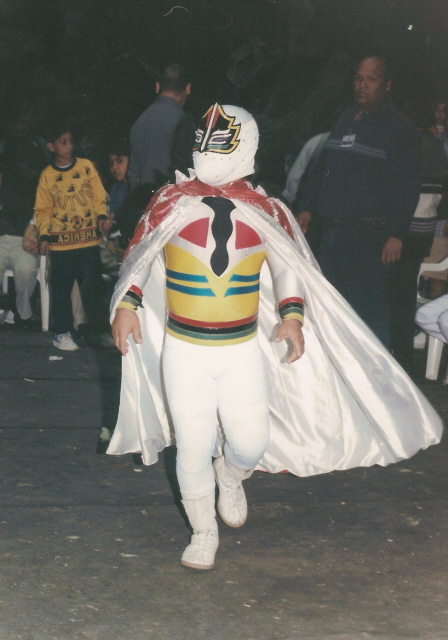
- Mascarita Sagrada on the way to the ring

Personal information
- Born: January 11, 1965 (age 61) San Felipe Pescador, Zacatecas, Mexico

Professional wrestling career
- Ring name(s): Pequeño Luki; Más chaparro que Benito Juarez; Mascarita Sagrada; Mr. / Little Lucky; Mini Nova
- Billed height: 1.35 m (4 ft 5 in)
- Billed weight: 42 kg (93 lb)
- Billed from: Mexico
- Trained by: Genaro Contreras; Muralla Sangrienta I
- Debut: September 22, 1989

Mascarita Sagrada (Note: At least three wrestlers have wrestled under the name "Mascarita Sagrada". This article is about the original.) (Spanish, 'Little Sacred Mask', real name not known, born January 11, 1965) is a Mexican wrestler. He is one of the most well-known Mexican Mini-Estrellas of the modern era. He is the original Mascarita Sagrada although there have been several wrestlers who have used the same gimmick through the years. In Mexico, Mascarita Sagrada has worked for AAA, Consejo Mundial de Lucha Libre (CMLL) and a long list of independent promoters over the years. He has also worked for American wrestling promotions World Wrestling Federation/Entertainment (WWF/WWE), World Championship Wrestling (WCW), Total Nonstop Action Wrestling (TNA) and Lucha VaVOOM. In the late 1990s he worked for the WWF as Mini Nova (sometimes just "Nova"). He has also been featured in several films and marketing campaigns, including an uncredited cameo in the film My Giant with Billy Crystal and an ad campaign for Virgin Mobile.

== Professional wrestling career ==
=== Early career (1987–1989) ===
The original Mascarita Sagrada was born in San Felipe Pescador, Zacatecas. He started training as a luchador in 1987 under the instructions of Muralla Sangrienta I and Sr. Genaro Contreras. His first appearance in the ring was as Pequeno Luki, teaming with Arturito ("Little Luke" and R2-D2). The team wrestled Gran Nikolai and Pequeno Goliath in Sagrada's debut.

=== Consejo Mundial de Lucha Libre (1989–1992) ===
In late 1989 then Consejo Mundial de Lucha Libre (CMLL) booker Antonio Peña created the mini division for CMLL. The original plan for Mascarita Sagrada was that he would be known as "Mini Atlantis" (named after Atlantis) but instead he was patterned after popular luchador Máscara Sagrada and given the name Mascarita Sagrada. During his first year working as Mascarita Sagrada he made guest appearances in Puerto Rico working for the World Wrestling Council (WWC) at their 17th Anniversary show teaming with Aguilita Solitaria losing to the team of Piratita Morgan and Espectrito. This was one of the early pairings of Mascarita Sagrada and Espectrito, a rivalry that would last for a decade and span several promotions.

Back in CMLL Sagrada took part in CMLL's 57th Anniversary show, this time in a traditional trios match teaming with Pequeno Cobarde and Aguilita Solitaria to beat los Pequeno Infernales (Piratita Morgan, MS ½, and Espectrito). In 1992, CMLL created a CMLL World Mini-Estrellas Championship due to the popularity of the minis division. Mascarita Sagrada defeated rival Espectrito in the finals to become the first CMLL Mini-Estrella world champion. Three months after winning the title Mascara Sagrada left CMLL to join Antonio Peña's newly created Asistencia Asesoría y Administración, later known simply as "AAA", promotion. Upon leaving CMLL the Minis title becomes vacant.

=== Asistencia Asesoría y Administración/AAA (1992–1997) ===
Mascarita Sagrada and Espectrito continued their feud in AAA, now with the newly created Mexican National Mini-Estrella Championship on the line instead of the CMLL one. On January 8, 1994 Espectrito defeated Sagrada in the tournament final to claim the title. On March 3, 1994 the roles were reversed once again as Mascarita Sagrada defeated Espectrito in a tournament final to win the newly created IWC World Minis Championship that was promoted mainly in the United States. the following month Mascarita Sagrada became a double title holder defeating Espectrito for the Mexican National title. On February 2, 1994 Jerrito Estrada defeated Sagrada for the National Minis title, and at some point during 1994 Espectrito won the IWC Minis title. On November 4, 1994 Mascarita Sagrada and Octagoncito teamed up to defeat Espectrito and Jerrito Estrada on AAA's first ever pay-per-view event When Worlds Collide.

1995 saw Mascarita Sagrada return to WWC for their 22nd Anniversary show. This time he faced another man he would develop a long lasting rivalry in Piratita Morgan. During this time period Mascarita Sagrada's relationship with AAA became strained as he resented the introduction of "Mascarita Sagrada, Jr." feeling that the company was trying to make money of his popularity.

=== World Championship Wrestling (1996) ===
In late 1996 Mascara Sagrada wrestled in a dark match before Starrcade 1996, where he teamed with Octagoncito (mini version of Octagón) and defeated Jerrito Estrada and Piratita Morgan. The next day the teams faced again, this time on Monday Nitro, both times saw Sagrada and Octagoncito win.

=== World Wrestling Federation (1997–1999) ===
In 1997 Mascarita Sagrada signed with the World Wrestling Federation (WWF) as part of their working relationship that saw several AAA wrestlers work for them. Sagrada was repackaged as Mini Nova or just Nova because Mascara Sagrada did not appear on WWF shows. The same was true for Mascara Sagrada, Jr. who was repackaged as "Max Mini" and Octagoncito that was repackaged as "Mosaic". Sagrada, or rather Nova made his in-ring debut at Bad Blood 1997 where Nova and Max Mini faced Tarantula and Mosaic. The match was not originally scheduled for the PPV, but the originally scheduled match was cancelled as Brian Pillman was found dead earlier that day. Nova and Mini won.

Nova made two appearances on WWF's Shotgun Saturday Night. On November 11, 1997 the minis made an appearance on Monday Night Raw where Max Mini, Nova, and Taurus fought Battalion, Tarantula and El Torito (Rival Espectrito under a different mask). The match was interrupted when Kane came to the ring and scared off the minis.

The Mascarita Sagrada / Espectrito feud even made it to WWF PPV as they faced off in a six-man tag team match at the 1998 Royal Rumble where Max Mini, Nova, and Mosaic defeated El Torito, Tarantula, and Battalion. the Minis did not appear on WWF television until the federation created their WWF Super Astros show, targeting the Latin American demographics. At first the storyline between Nova and Max Mini and El Torito and Battalion, but then the story turned towards tension building between Nova and Max Mini. They faced off in a match to settle their differences in the ring, but Nova cheated to win. Subsequently, Nova teamed with longtime rival Battalion to face Mini and El Torrito. Then finally on May 30, 1999 Nova faced Max Mini in a Lucha de Apuestas ("Bet fight") where both men put their masks on the line. Max Mini won and for the first and only time in his career Nova was unmasked in public.

=== Return to Mexico (1999–2005) ===
After his contract with the WWF ended, he resumed working in Mexico as Mascarita Sagrada, mostly doing independent wrestling show appearances. Occasionally he would work for CMLL as well, such as the CMLL 71st anniversary show. Mascarita Sagrada, Shockercito and Tzuki defeated Espectrito, Fire and Pequeño Violencia in three falls. Mascara Sagrada made a special one-time appearance for Total Nonstop Action Wrestling (TNA) in 2004, as he was part of their first monthly PPV Victory Road where he defeated Piratita Morgan. After making a onetime appearance Mascarita Sagrada returned to Mexico.

=== Return to WWE (2005–2006) ===
In October 2005 the WWE created a Juniors' Division exclusive to their SmackDown brand. The division featured a number of minis from Mexico that mainly appeared in backstage skits of a comedic nature. Mascarita Sagrada signed with the WWE and in 2006 made several in-ring appearances as part of the "Juniors division". Sagrada only made one wrestling appearance on the actual SmackDown show, a tag team match where he teamed with Tsuki to take on Octagoncito and Pequeno Violencia. The match ended in a no-contest after interference from Finlay using the mini stars to make a point. Mascarita Sagrada made two more in-ring appearances on Velocity where he defeated Octagoncito, and then a week later he defeated Tsuki. By March 2006 the WWE gave up on the Juniors division and released all the mini wrestlers.

=== Later career (2006–present) ===
In 2007 Mascara Sagrada was involved in an incident during an independent promotion's show. On the card was Tsuki, who in the past had appeared as "Mascarita Sagrada", and Sagrada got wind of the fact that Tsuki was planning on working under that gimmick on a few shows in the future. On that night Sagrada entered the locker room and took the Mascara Sagrada outfit from Tsuki's luggage threatening him with legal action if he ever used it again. Since then, Tsuki has not worked as Mascarita Sagrada.

== Other media ==
In 1992, Sagrada played a minor part in the movie Luchadores de las Estrellas ("Starfighters" in English) where he played the role "Mini #1". He's also been featured in other several films and marketing campaigns, including an unaccredited cameo in the film My Giant with Billy Crystal and an ad campaign for Virgin Mobile.

In early 2009, there was some controversy over Mascarita Sagrada's appearance in the movie "Feast III: the Happy Finish". A photo from the movie was published where it looked like Sagrada was caught without his mask, and people complained that the producers broke with Lucha Libre "code" by showing him unmasked. Mascarita Sagrada himself confirmed a few days later that it was an actor that they showed unmasked, and that Sagrada did the wrestling scenes but remained masked the entire time.

On February 12, 2007, Yahoo! Music released a music video for the song "Uruapan Breaks" from popular Mexican band Kinky, off their album Reina. The video features Mascarita Sagrada in a modern homage to the popular Mexican wrestler movies of the 1960s and 70s.

== Personal life ==
According to his Myspace page, Mascarita Sagrada is both married and has children, but because he's always worked under a mask and never given his real name nothing else is known about that part of his life. Sagrada is also involved in charitable events, especially those focusing on children, such as visits to hospitals and orphanages.

== Resemblances ==
Besides the original Mascarita Sagrada, AAA have given the gimmick to several other minis over the years, just like Sagrada's Normal sized name sake, Mascara Sagrada. The following have at one time or another performed as Mascarita Sagrada besides the original.

| "Clone Name" | Also known as | Notes |
|---|---|---|
| Mascarita Sagrada Jr. | Tzuki | Dropped the "Jr." part of his name when working for the WWF. Changed names in 1997 but has used the Mascarita Sagrada gimmick on shows up to mid-2007. |
| Mascarita Sagrada 2000 | Mascarita Dorada | introduced by AAA after the original left the promotion. Dropped "2000"after working for a few months. Changed name when he left AAA to work for CMLL. |
| Mascarita Sagrada Jr. (II) | Novillerito | Used the gimmick in December 2005. He worked as Vladimiro in Lucha Libre USA |
| Mascarita Sagrada (2007) | Unknown | there was never any public acknowledgement of Mascarita Sagrada 2000's departure from the company, instead this Sagrada started working before Mascara Dorada made his CMLL debut. Not clear if this is Novillerito working under the gimmick full-time or if it's someone else. |
| Mascarita Sagrada (Lucha Underground) | Unknown | Lucha Underground's version. |

== Championships and accomplishments ==
- Asistencia Asesoría y Administración / AAA
  - AAA/IWC Minis Championship (1 time)
  - Mexican National Mini-Estrella Championship (1 time)
- Consejo Mundial de Lucha Libre
  - CMLL World Mini-Estrella Championship (1 time)
- World Wrestling Association
  - WWA World Minis Championship (1 time, current)

== Luchas de Apuestas record ==
| Winner (wager) | Loser (wager) | Location | Event | Date | Notes |
|---|---|---|---|---|---|
| Mascarita Sagrada (mask) | Coquito Negro (mask) | N/A | Live event | N/A | |
| Mascarita Sagrada (mask) | Coquito Negro (hair) | N/A | Live event | N/A | |
| Mascarita Sagrada (mask) | Coquito Azul (mask) | N/A | Live event | N/A | |
| Mascarita Sagrada (mask) | Tigrito Plateado (mask) | N/A | Live event | N/A | |
| Mascarita Sagrada (mask) | Sexy Leoncito (hair) | San Luis Potosí, San Luis Potosí] | Live event | N/A | |
| Mascarita Sagrada (mask) | Piratita Morgan (hair) | Mexico City | CMLL show | August 2, 1991 | |
| Mascarita Sagrada (mask) | Espectrito (mask) | Los Angeles, California | AAA Night of Champions | August 6, 1994 | |
| Mascarita Sagrada (mask) | Piratita Morgan (hair) | Cuautitlán, Mexico State | Live event | November 26, 1996 | |
| Max Mini (mask) | Mini Nova (mask) | United States | WWF Super Astros | May 30, 1999 | |
| Mascarita Sagrada (mask) | Coquito Rojo (mask) | Nezahualcoyotl, Mexico State | Live event | December 21, 2000 | |
| Mascarita Sagrada (mask) | Coquito Verde (mask) | Tijuana, Baja California | Live event | January 19, 2001 | |
| Mascarita Sagrada (mask) | Piratita Morgan (mask) | Tijuana, Baja California | Live event | November 23, 2001 | |
| Mascarita Sagrada | Niño de la Calle (hair) | Aguascalientes, Aguascalientes | Live event | March 8, 2002 | |
| Mascarita Sagrada (mask) | Niño de la Calle (hair) | N/A | Live event | 2005 | |
| Mascarita Sagrada (mask) | Fantástico (mask) | Tijuana, Baja California | Live event | February 1, 2013 | (Note: Met in the finals of a "Losers Advances" tournament.) |
