= Triplemanía II-B =

1994 Lucha Libre AAA World Wide event

- The official poster for Triplemanía II featuring the majority of the wrestlers who would work the three shows.
- Promotion: Asistencia Asesoría y Administración
- Date: May 15, 1994
- City: Zapopan, Jalisco, Mexico
- Venue: Auditorio Benito Juárez de Zapopan
- Attendance: 11,200
- Tagline(s): La Cuenta Final ("The Final Reckoning")

Triplemanía chronology
| ← Previous; II-A | Next → II-C |

Triplemanía II-B was a major professional wrestling event Asistencia Asesoría y Administración (AAA) that took place at Auditorio Benito Juárez de Zapopan in Zapopan, Jalisco on May 15, 1994. The show was the second of three Triplemanía II shows held in 1994, preceded by Triplemanía II-A, with a subsequent show held in 12 days later. 1994 was the first year AAA held multiple Triplemanía shows in a year, a tradition they would continue through 1997, after which Triplemanía became a single annual event. The annual Triplemanía show(s) are AAA's biggest show of the year, serving as the culmination of major storylines and feature wrestlers from all over the world competing in what has been described as AAA's version of WrestleMania or their Super Bowl event. The event aired on June 5, 1994 and June 12, 1994 in two parts as episodes of AAA's weekly television program Sin Límite.

The Main event featured a Six-man "Lucha Libre rules" tag team match between the teams of Konnan, Perro Aguayo, and Cien Caras and the Los Gringos Locos team of Jake Roberts, Love Machine, and Miguel Pérez Jr. The semi-main event featured a best two-out-of-three falls Lucha de Apuestas, or bet match where both Máscara Sagrada and Black Cat put their mask on the line in the match. The show featured Japanese wrestlers Jushin Thunder Liger and Tiger Mask III on loan from New Japan Pro-Wrestling (NJPW). The fifth match of the night featured wrestlers who had worked primarily for the Universal Wrestling Association (UWA) until that point, Shu el Guerrero, Scorpio, Jr., and Gran Hamada, fighting AAA representatives Los Payasos ("The Clowns"; Coco Rojo, Coco Verde and Coco Amarillo)

== Production ==
=== Background ===
AAA founder Antonio Peña had originally envisioned the Triplemanía series as three shows held over the summer, but for the first year AAA only held 1 show, Triplemanía I. In 1994 AAA announced that they would hold three Triplemanía shows, building the storylines into its climax at the third and final Triplemanía II show. The first show, Triplemanía II-A, would take place in the outdoor baseball stadium in Aguascalientes, Aguascalientes on April 26, the second show, Triplemanía II-B, would be at the Estadio Olímpico Benito Juárez in Zapopan, Jalisco on May 15 and the third and final Triplemanía II show, Triplemanía II-C, would happen at the El Toro bullfighting arena in Tijuana, Baja California on May 27, 1994.

=== Storylines ===
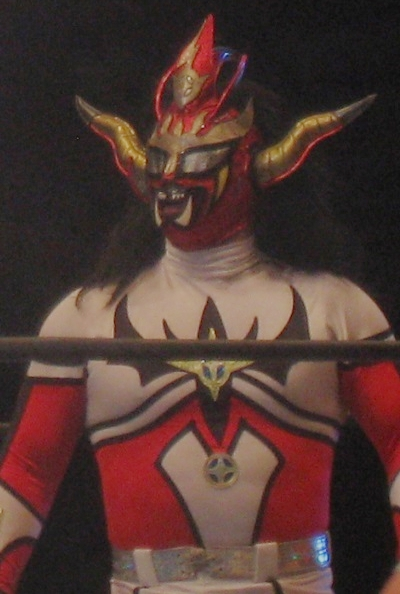
Jushin Thunder Liger traveled from Japan for the show.

The Triplemanía show featured eight professional wrestling matches with different wrestlers involved in pre-existing scripted feuds, plots and storylines. Wrestlers were portrayed as either heels (referred to as rudos in Mexico, those that portray the "bad guys") or faces (técnicos in Mexico, the "good guy" characters) as they followed a series of tension-building events, which culminated in a wrestling match or series of matches. Storylines were produced on AAA's various events and their weekly television program Sin Límite.

== Aftermath ==
The show was a direct build to Triplemanía II-C held only 12 days later in Tijuana, Baja California. Triplemanía II-C saw Konnan finally gain revenge on Jake Roberts as he defeated Roberts in two straight falls to force him to be shaved bald after the match. Most of AAA's roster, both tecnicos and rudos, came to the ring after the match to show their unity and to ensure Roberts had his hair shaved off. Roberts would remain with AAA for several months after the show but was not involved in any major storylines after the loss to Konnan. The Los Gringos Locos storyline carried AAA into their subsequent major shows "Night of Champions" and later on their first ever pay-per-view (PPV) AAA When Worlds Collide that was driven by the feud between a Pareja del Terror (Eddy Guerrero and Love Machine) facing off against El Hijo del Santo and Octagón in a Luchas de Apuestas match where Guerrero and Love Machine ended up losing their hair. 19 days afterwards Love Machine, real name Art Barr, dies of unknown causes. The popularity of Konnan in the wake of his victory over Jake Robers made his turn to the rudo side months later ever more shocking, with Konnan attacking his longtime friend Perro Aguayo during a match and joining Los Gringos Locos instead. At "When Worlds Collide" Aguayo defeated Konnan in a steel cage match.

A few days after the show the then-Mexican National Middleweight Champion was involved in a car accident where he injured his hand. Due to the injury the local boxing and wrestling commission could not give him medical clearance to wrestle against Blue Panther at Triplemanía II-C, causing him to forfeit the championship to Blue Panther.

== Reception ==
John Molinario, who writes about wrestling for the Canadian Online Explorer, described the show as "possibly the best TripleMania show ever." and stated that it was "from top to bottom a sensational show". Wrestling Observer Newsletter founder and editor Dave Meltzer commented that the "show was awesome. It was among the greatest shows I probably ever saw" after witnessing the show live and in person. Meltzer rated the "Atómicos" tag team match at four-and-a-half star, the lucha de apuestas match at four-and-three-quarters stars, while giving the main event six-man tag team match four stars.

== Results ==
| No. | Results | Stipulations | Times |
|---|---|---|---|
| 1 | Giro, Colorado and El Torero defeated Fantasma de la Quebrada, Marabunta and Aullido | Best two-out-of-three falls six-man "lucha libre rules" tag team match | 13:23 |
| 2 | Latin Lover, Ángel Azteca, and El Fantasma defeated Maremoto, Terremoto, and Hectombre | Best two-out-of-three falls six-man "lucha libre rules" tag team match | 10:13 |
| 3 | Mascarita Sagrada and Jerrito Estrada defeated Micro Konnan and Espectrito by disqualification | Best two-out-of-three falls tag team Match | 10:11 |
| 4 | Misterioso, Fuerza Guerrera and Juventud Guerrera defeated Volador, Rey Misterio, and Rey Misterio Jr. | Best two-out-of-three falls six-man "lucha libre rules" tag team match | 17:23 |
| 5 | Los Payasos (Coco Rojo, Coco Verde and Coco Amarillo) defeated Shu el Guerrero, Scorpio Jr., and Gran Hamada | Best two-out-of-three falls six-man "lucha libre rules" tag team match | 15:07 |
| 6 | Jushin Thunder Liger, Tiger Mask III, El Hijo del Santo, and Octagón defeated La Parka, Psicosis, Blue Panther, and Eddy Guerrero | Best two-out-of-three falls eight-man "Atómicos" tag team match | 23:22 |
| 7 | Máscara Sagrada defeated Black Cat: First Fall: Máscara Sagrada pinned Black Cat (1-0); Second Fall: Máscara Sagrada was disqualified (1-1); Third Fall: Black Cat was counted out (2-1) | Best two-out-of-three falls Lucha de Apuestas "Mask vs. Mask" match | 29:04 |
| 8 | Konnan, Perro Aguayo, and Cien Caras defeated Jake Roberts, Love Machine, and Miguel Pérez Jr.: First Fall: Jake Roberts, Miguel Perez Jr. and Love Machine were disqualified (1-0); Second Fall: Konnan pinned Migue Perez Jr. and Perro Aguayo pinned Love Machine (2-0) | Best two-out-of-three falls six-man "lucha libre rules" tag team match | 17:46 |
