= Triplemanía II-C =

1994 Lucha Libre AAA World Wide event

- The official poster for Triplemanía II featuring the majority of the wrestlers who would work the three shows.
- Promotion: Asistencia Asesoría y Administración
- Date: May 27, 1994
- City: Tijuana, Baja California, Mexico
- Venue: El Toreo
- Attendance: 18,000
- Tagline(s): La Cuenta Final ("The Final Reckoning")

Pay-per-view chronology
← Previous; Triplemanía II-B	Next → AAA When Worlds Collide

Triplemanía chronology
← Previous; II-B	Next → III-A

Triplemanía II-C was a major professional wrestling event Asistencia Asesoría y Administración (AAA) that took place at the El Toreo bullfighting arena in Tijuana, Baja California, Mexico on May 27, 1994. The show was the final of three Triplemanía II shows held in 1994, preceded by Triplemanía II-A in April and Triplemanía II-B held 12 days prior. 1994 was the first year AAA held multiple Triplemanía shows in a year, a tradition they would continue through 1997, after which Triplemanía became a single annual event. The annual Triplemanía show(s) are AAA's biggest show of the year, serving as the culmination of major storylines and feature wrestlers from all over the world competing in what has been described as AAA's version of WrestleMania or their Super Bowl event. The May 27th show was the fourth overall show produced under the Triplemanía banner. The event aired on June 19, 1994 and June 26, 1994 in two parts as episodes of AAA's weekly television program Sin Límite.

The main event match was the culmination of a storyline that AAA had been building for a year, starting at the previous year's Triplemanía I show. Portraying the archetypes of "good" and "evil' AAA had created a storyline where the "hero" Konnan sought revenge against the "villain" Jake "The Snake" Roberts. The two faced off in a Lucha de Apuestas, or bet match, which is considered the ultimate "feud settler" in Mexican wrestling. For the match both competitors bet their hair on the outcome of the match, with the loser being subjected to the humiliation of being shaved bald in the center of the ring. The show also featured a steel cage match between Los Hermanos Dinamita (Spanish for "The Dynamite Brothers"; Cien Caras, Máscara Año 2000 and Universo 2000) fighting Los Payasos ("The Clowns"; Coco Rojo, Coco Verde and Coco Amarillo) in a rematch from Triplemanía II-A where Los Payasos won the Mexican National Trios Championship from Los Hermanos Dinamita. The show was also supposed to feature a match for the Mexican National Middleweight Championship but the reigning champion Octagón was not medically cleared to wrestle.

== Production ==
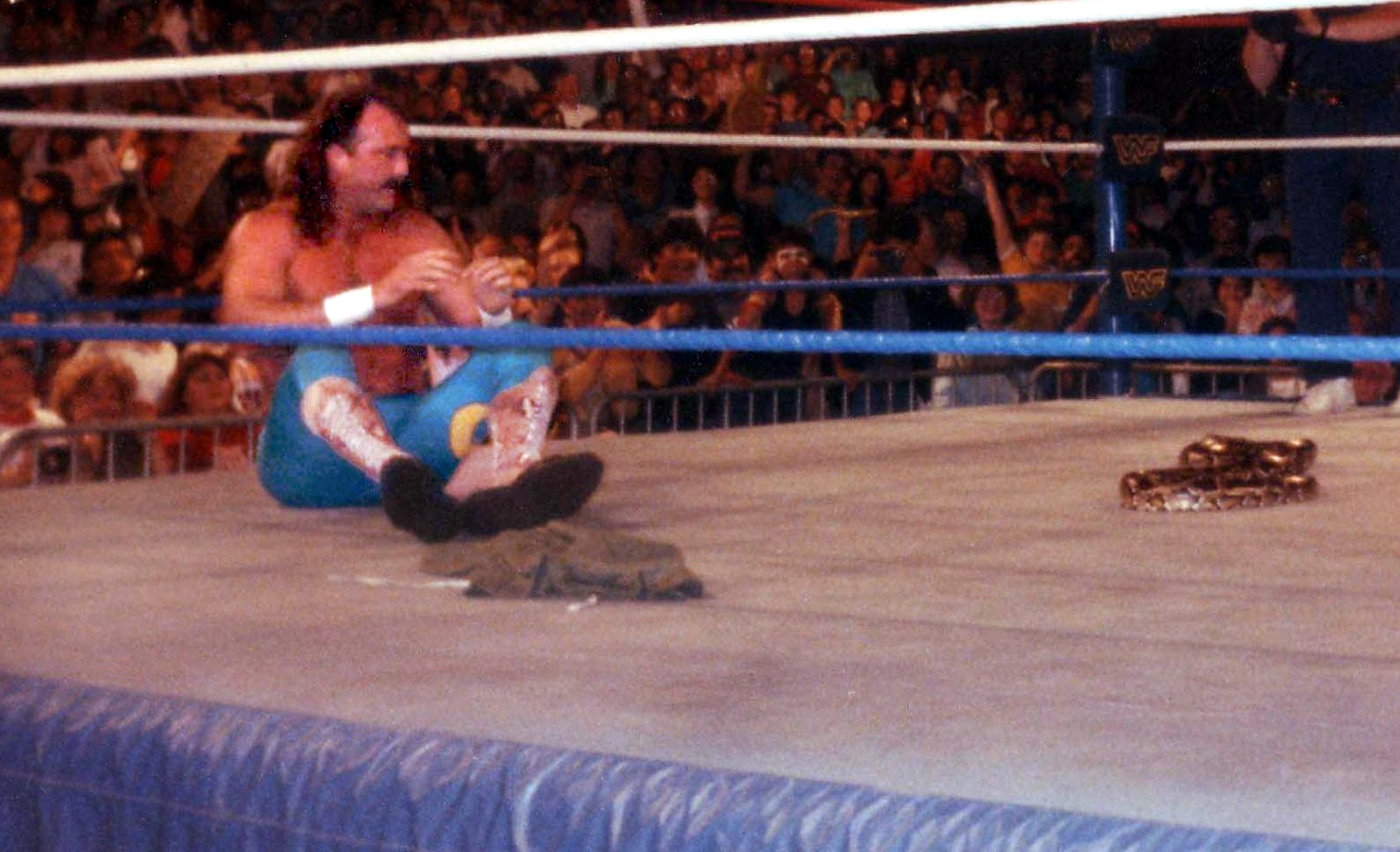
Jake Roberts, risked his hair on the outcome of the main event match.

=== Background ===
AAA founder Antonio Peña had originally envisioned the Triplemanía series as three shows held over the summer, but for the first year AAA only held 1 show, Triplemanía I. In 1994 AAA announced that they would hold three Triplemanía shows, building the storylines into its climax at the third and final Triplemanía II show. The first show, Triplemanía II-A, took place in the outdoor baseball stadium in Aguascalientes, Aguascalientes on April 26, the second show, Triplemanía II-B, was held at the Estadio Olímpico Benito Juárez in Zapopan, Jalisco on May 15 and the third and final Triplemanía II show, Triplemanía II-C, would happen at the El Toro bullfighting arena in Tijuana, Baja California on May 27, 1994.

=== Storylines ===
The Triplemanía show featured eight professional wrestling matches with different wrestlers involved in pre-existing scripted feuds, plots and storylines. Wrestlers were portrayed as either heels (referred to as rudos in Mexico, those that portray the "bad guys") or faces (técnicos in Mexico, the "good guy" characters) as they followed a series of tension-building events, which culminated in a wrestling match or series of matches. Storylines were produced on AAA's various events and their weekly television program Sin Límite.

The main event match would be the conclusion of the main storyline of AAA at the time as Peña and the AAA officials had spent over a year laying out the storyline between Konnan and Jake "the Snake" Roberts. The foundation of the story began a year prior to Triplemanía II-C, at the first ever Triplemanía I, held on April 30, 1993. To start the storyline Roberts was given a spot in the front row, presented as if he had bought a ticket on his own and was just there to watch the show. The main event was a "Retirement match" between Konnan and Cien Caras where the loser would be forced to retire, which saw Jake Roberts become involved in the match, arguing with Konnan during the second fall and actually distracted him enough to get counted out. With the loss Konnan was forced to retire and due to his actions Roberts became the top rudo of AAA as he was seen as directly responsible for the popular Konnan being forced to retire. For several months AAA booked Roberts in only special appearances, not actually wrestling but making appearances to remind people of what he did to Konnan. After about four months Konnan returned to AAA and together with Peña supposedly petitioned the Mexico City boxing and wrestling commission to get Konnan reinstated. The storyline explanation given was that he was allowed to return to wrestling due to Roberts' interference in the match. AAA built their August 28, 1993 La Revencha show in the Los Angeles Sports Arena around Konnan finally getting in the ring with Roberts, in a three-way elimination match that also included Cien Caras. Konnan forced Cien Caras to submit, gaining a measure of revenge from their Triplemanía match. Later on Jake "the Snake" Roberts got himself disqualified when Los Gringos Locos (Eddy Guerrero and Love Machine) interfered in the match. On November 12, 1993 Jake Roberts and Los Gringos Locos defeated Konnan, Blue Panther and Perro Aguayo in the main event of AAA"s La Lucha del Honor event at the Los Angeles Sports Arena. During the match Roberts pinned Konnan in both the second and the third fall.

Part of Peña booking strategy was to not have the two rivals fight one-on-one right away, building the anticipation to when they finally get in the ring for their first singles match. Roberts kept the advantage, using his partnership with Los Gringos Locos to have the numbers advantage. AAA kept the two apart until March 12, 1994 where the two finally faced off. They met in a steel cage match to even the numbers in the main event of AAA's spring Los Angeles Sports Arena show. During the show Konnan finally gained a measure of revenge on Roberts, winning the match by climbing out of the cage, but still had not pinned Roberts. The loss to Konnan was used as the impetus to Roberts finally agreeing to put his hair on the line in a Lucha de Apuesta, or "bet match", which was the ultimate end game for the storyline. The match was scheduled to be the main event of the third Triplemanía II show, with a preview of it taking place at Triplemanía II-B where Konnan, Perro Aguayo and Cien Caras defeated Jake Roberts, Love Machine and Miguel Pérez Jr. in the main event.

== Event ==
The fifth match of the night, a match that was supposed to see Octagón defend his Mexican National Middleweight Championship against Blue Panther. A few days prior to the match Octagón was involved in a car accident, suffering a hand injury. The wrestling boxing commission could not medically clear Octagón to wrestle on the show. Instead he came to the ring with the championship and handed it over to Blue Panther via forfeit, only asking for a rematch once he had recovered from his injury.

== Aftermath ==
Roberts would remain with AAA for several months after losing all his hair, he ended up turning on Los Gringos Locos and actually teamed up with Konnan only a few months later. defeating the team of Perro Aguayo and Vampiro. The Los Gringos Locos storyline carried AAA into their subsequent major shows "Night of Champions" and later on their first ever pay-per-view (PPV) AAA When Worlds Collide that was driven by the feud between a Pareja del Terror (Eddy Guerrero and Love Machine) facing off against El Hijo del Santo and Octagón in a Luchas de Apuestas match where Guerrero and Love Machine ended up losing their hair. 19 days afterwards Love Machine, real name Art Barr, dies of unknown causes. The popularity of Konnan in the wake of his victory over Jake Robers made his turn to the rudo side months later ever more shocking, with Konnan attacking his longtime friend Perro Aguayo during a match and joining Los Gringos Locos instead. At "When Worlds Collide" Aguayo defeated Konnan in a steel cage match.

Once Octagón had recovered from his hand injury he received a rematch for the championship he never lost in the ring, but on August 4, 1994 Blue Panther successfully defended the title against Octagón.

== Reception ==
John Molinario, who writes about wrestling for the Canadian Online Explorer, described the show as a "booking masterpiece by Pena" and that it established Antonio Peña as "the best booker in the business." Wrestling commentator Mike Tenay, who was in attendance that night, recalled "the great heat for that main event match".

== Results ==
No.	Results	Stipulations	Times
1	Super Amigo, El Plumo, and Depredator defeated La Ola Lila (May Flowers, Pimpinela Escarlata, and Rudy Reyna)	Best two-out-of-three falls six-man "Lucha Libre rules" tag team match	12:37
2	Rambo, Magnate and Espanto Jr. defeated Winners, Super Caló and El Solar	Best two-out-of-three falls six-man "Lucha Libre rules" tag team match	13:00
3	El Torero, Rey Misterio, and Rey Misterio Jr. defeated Fuerza Guerrera, Fishman, and Pirata Morgan	Best two-out-of-three falls six-man "Lucha Libre rules" tag team match	16:19
4	Volador, Tinieblas Jr. and Lizmark Jr. defeated Love Machine, Miguel Pérez Jr. and Misterioso by disqualification	Best two-out-of-three falls six-man "Lucha Libre rules" tag team match	10:53
5	Blue Panther defeated Octagón (C) by forfeit	Singles match for the Mexican National Middleweight Championship	—
6	Perro Aguayo, Lizmark, El Hijo del Santo, and Máscara Sagrada defeated La Parka, Psicosis, Black Cat and El Satánico: Fall One: Lizmark pinned El Satánico (1-0); Fall Two: Black Cat won by submission (1-1); Fall Three: Máscara Sagrada pinned El Satánico (2-1)	Best two-out-of-three falls eight-man "Atómicos" tag team match	20:23
7	Los Hermanos Dinamita (Cien Caras, Máscara Año 2000 and Universo 2000) defeated Los Payasos (Coco Rojo, Coco Verde and Coco Amarillo)	Steel Cage Match – Los Hermanos Dinamita won when Cien Caras was the last of his team to leave escape the cage	09:44
8	Konnan defeated Jake Roberts (with The Warlord): Fall One: Konnan pinned Jake Roberts (1-0); Fall two: Konnan pinned Jake Roberts (2-0)	Best two-out-of-three falls Lucha de Apuesta, "Hair vs. Hair" match. As a result, Jake Roberts had his head shaved.	—
