= Triplemanía II-A =

1994 Lucha Libre AAA World Wide event

- The official poster for Triplemanía II featuring the majority of the wrestlers who would work the three shows.
- Promotion: Asistencia Asesoría y Administración
- Date: April 26, 1994
- City: Aguascalientes, Aguascalientes, Mexico
- Venue: Plaza de Toros "La Monumental"
- Attendance: 9,500
- Tagline(s): La Cuenta Final ("The Final Reckoning")

Triplemanía chronology
← Previous; I	Next → II-B

Triplemanía II-A was a major professional wrestling event Asistencia Asesoría y Administración (AAA) that took place at the Aguascalientes baseball stadium on April 26, 1994. The show was the first of three Triplemanía II shows held in 1994 with two subsequent shows held in May. 1994 was the first year AAA held multiple Triplemanía shows in a year, a tradition they would continue through 1997, after which Triplemanía became a single annual event. The annual Triplemanía show(s) are AAA's biggest show of the year, serving as the culmination of major storylines and feature wrestlers from all over the world competing in what has been described as AAA's version of WrestleMania or their Super Bowl event. The event aired on May 22, 1994 and May 29, 1994 in two parts as episodes of AAA's weekly television program Sin Límite.

In the main event of the first Triplemanía II show was a Lucha de Apuestas, or bet match, where both Heavy Metal and Jerry Estrada "bet" their hair on the outcome of the match. The main event originally ended in a disqualification loss for Heavy Metal, which seemed like he was going to be shaved bald. Moments later AAA owner and booker Antonio Peña came to ringside and restarted the match, with Heavy Metal winning the match and the hair of Jerry Estrada. On the under-card the team known as Los Payasos (Spanish for "The Clowns"; Coco Rojo, Coco Verde and Coco Amarillo) defeated Los Hermanos Dinamita (Cien Caras, Máscara Año 2000 and Universo 2000) to win the Mexican National Trios Championship. The show featured six additional matches with AAA wrestlers as well as the Japanese Tiger Mask III from New Japan Pro-Wrestling.

== Production ==
=== Background ===
AAA founder Antonio Peña had originally envisioned the Triplemanía series as three shows held over the summer, but for the first year AAA only held 1 show, Triplemanía I. In 1994 AAA announced that they would hold three Triplemanía shows, building the storylines into its climax at the third and final Triplemanía II show. The first Triplemanía II show would take place in the outdoor baseball stadium in Aguascalientes, Aguascalientes on April 26, the second show, Triplemanía II-B, would be at the Estadio Olímpico Benito Juárez in Zapopan, Jalisco on May 15 and the third and final Triplemanía II show, Triplemanía II-C, would happen at the El Toro bullfighting arena in Tijuana, Baja California on May 27, 1994. Peña decided that Konnan and Jake Roberts, who were slated to main event Triplemanía II-C would not face off at Triplemanía II-A, making it more special when they actually fought on the later Triplemanía shows.

=== Storylines ===
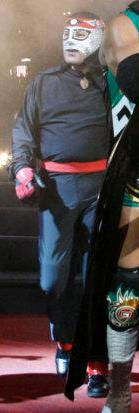
Octagón, teamed with El Hijo del Santo and Perro Aguayo to defeat Los Gringos Locos.

The Triplemanía show featured eight professional wrestling matches with different wrestlers involved in pre-existing scripted feuds, plots and storylines. Wrestlers were portrayed as either heels (referred to as rudos in Mexico, those that portray the "bad guys") or faces (técnicos in Mexico, the "good guy" characters) as they followed a series of tension-building events, which culminated in a wrestling match or series of matches. Storylines were produced on AAA's various events and their weekly television program Sin Límite.

== Event ==
During the fifth match of the night cameras showed wrestlers Miguel Pérez, Jr. and Chicano Power in the crowd, holding up a Puerto Rican flag while heckling Konnan. At one point during the match Konnan's partner Máscara Sagrada had to prevent him from jumping into the crowd to go after the two heckling wrestlers.

== Aftermath ==
AAA's main storyline post Triplemanía II-A and for more or less the entire year that followed was Los Gringos Locos and their storyline war with all of AAA. The next chapter came at Triplemanía II-B where Black Cat was unmasked after losing a Lucha de Apuestas to Máscara Sagrada. The main event of Triplemanía II-B saw Miguel Pérez Jr. debut as part of Los Gringos Locos, following up on his appearance in the crowd during Triplemanía II-A. Pérez, Roberts and Love Machine would lose to Konnan, Aguayo and Cien Caras. That match served as a preview to Triplemanía II-C's main event between Konnan and Jake Roberts where Konnan finally ended the storyline with Roberts that had started a year earlier. The Los Gringos Locos storyline carried AAA into their subsequent major shows "Night of Champions" and later on their first ever pay-per-view (PPV) AAA When Worlds Collide that was driven by the feud between a Pareja del Terror (Eddy Guerrero and Love Machine) facing off against El Hijo del Santo and Octagón in a Luchas de Apuestas match where Guerrero and Love Machine ended up losing their hair. 19 days afterwards Love Machine, real name Art Barr, dies of unknown causes. The popularity of Konnan in the wake of his victory over Jake Robers made his turn to the rudo side months later ever more shocking, with Konnan attacking his longtime friend Perro Aguayo during a match and joining Los Gringos Locos instead. As When Worlds Collide Aguayo defeated Konnan in a steel cage match.

Los Payasos winning the Mexican National Trios Championship would be one of the last victories in the trios' "Undefeated Streak" (Note: The wrestlers who played Los Payasos had lost several times in their previous identities, but AAA had booked them to win every single match they had up until this point.) Los Payasos lost the Mexican National Trios Championship to the team of Ángel Azteca, El Hijo del Santo and Super Muñeco on May 22, 1994. Los Payasos and Los Hermanos Dinamita in what became a non-title rematch at Triplemanía II-C which tool place inside a steel cage match. At the show Los Hermanos Dinamita were able to hand Los Payasos their second loss ever.

NJPW representative Tiger Mask III also competed at the next Triplemanía II show, teaming with fellow NJPW representative Jushin Thunder Liger and AAA representatives El Hijo del Santo and Octagón, defeating the team of La Parka, Psicosis, Blue Panther, and Eddy Guerrero at Triplemanía II-B Afterwards Tiger Mask II and Jushin Thunder Liger returned to Japan but AAA and NJPW would work together repeatedly over the years until NJPW began partnering with Consejo Mundial de Lucha Libre (CMLL) in Mexico. At that point AAA began working with Pro Wrestling Noah and has toured Japan on more than one occasion.

== Reception ==
John Molinario, who writes about wrestling for the Canadian Online Explorer, wrote that the main event Lucha de Apuestas match was considered the best match on the show and stated that "Fans and critics were blown away by the show, thinking that there was no way the remaining two shows could possibly match its quality".

== Results ==
No.	Results	Stipulations
1	Rey Misterio, Rey Misterio Jr. and Winners defeated Los Destructores (Tony Arce, Vulcano and Rocco Valente)	Six-man "lucha libre rules" tag team match
2	Mascarita Sagrada, Octagoncito and Super Muñequito defeated Espectrito, Jerrito Estrada and Fuercito Guerrera by disqualification.	Six-man "lucha libre rules" tag team match
3	El Satánico, Espectro Jr. and Psicosis defeated Tinieblas Jr., Lizmark Jr. and Lizmark	Six-man "lucha libre rules" tag team match
4	Misterioso, Fuerza Guerrera and Juventud Guerrera defeated Latin Lover, Volador and El Mexicano	Six-man "lucha libre rules" tag team match
5	Tiger Mask III, Konnan and Máscara Sagrada defeated La Parka, Blue Panther and Fishman	Six-man "lucha libre rules" tag team match
6	Los Payasos (Coco Rojo, Coco Verde and Coco Amarillo) defeated Los Hermanos Dinamita (Cien Caras, Máscara Año 2000 and Universo 2000) (c)	Six-man "lucha libre rules" tag team match for the Mexican National Trios Championship
7	El Hijo del Santo, Octagón and Perro Aguayo defeated Los Gringos Locos (Love Machine, Black Cat and Eddy Guerrero) by disqualification.	Six-man "lucha libre rules" tag team match
8	Heavy Metal defeated Jerry Estrada	Lucha de Apuestas "Hair vs. Hair" match
(c) / – the champion(s) heading into the match
