= Triplemanía II =

Triplemanía II was the name used by three professional wrestling events promoted and produced by the Mexican professional wrestling promotion Asistencia Asesoría y Administración (AAA or Triple A). The three events were held on April 26, May 15 and 27, 1994. It marked the second year in a row that AAA has held a Triplemanía show and comprised the second, third, and fourth overall shows held under the Triplemanía banner. Triplemanía II may refer to:

- Triplemanía II-A, the first Triplemanía II show
- Triplemanía II-B, the second Triplemanía II show
- Triplemanía II-C, the third Triplemanía II show
