= Triplemanía I =

1993 Asistencia Asesoría y Administración event

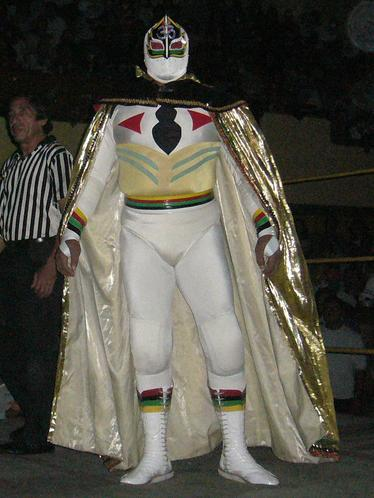
- Máscara Sagrada, teamed up with Love Machine and Mascarita Sagrada in the sixth match of the night.
- Promotion: Asistencia Asesoría y Administración
- Date: April 30, 1993 (aired May 21, 1993)
- City: Mexico City, Mexico
- Venue: Plaza de Toros
- Attendance: 48,000 - 50,000

Triplemanía chronology
| ← Previous; First | Next → II-A |

Triplemanía I (Referred to as just "Triplemanía" the first year) was the first ever Triplemanía professional wrestling show promoted by Asistencia Asesoría y Administración (AAA). The show took place on April 30, 1993 in Mexico City, Mexico's Plaza de Toros bullfighting arena. The Main event featured a "Retirement" match between Konnan and Cien Caras, where the storyline was that the person that lost would have to retire from professional wrestling. The match was billed as the first time such a stipulation had ever been used in Mexico, while it was rare, retirement matches had happened in the country before that time. The semi-main event featured the zenith of the storyline feud between Perro Aguayo and Máscara Año 2000 as the two fought in a Lucha de Apuestas, or bet match, where Aguayo put his hair on the line and Máscara Año 2000 bet his wrestling mask on the outcome of the match.

The show was the first major show for AAA, taking place just short of a year after Antonio Peña and a number of wrestlers broke away from Consejo Mundial de Lucha Libre (CMLL) to establish AAA. With time the annual Triplemanía show(s) would become AAA's biggest show of the year, serving as the culmination of major storylines and feature wrestlers from all over the world competing in what has been described as AAA's version of WrestleMania or their Super Bowl event.

== Production ==
=== Background ===
In early 1992 Antonio Peña was working as a booker and storyline writer for Consejo Mundial de Lucha Libre (CMLL), Mexico's largest and the world's oldest wrestling promotion, and was frustrated by CMLL's very conservative approach to professional wrestling, specifically the style of wrestling known as Lucha Libre (Spanish for "freestyle wrestling"). He joined forced with a number of younger, very talented wrestlers who felt like CMLL was not giving them recognition they deserved and decided to split from CMLL to create Asistencia Asesoría y Administración (AAA). After making a deal with the Televisa television network AAA held their first show in April, 1992. Peña's ideas included playing up the show aspects of wrestling, elaborate entrances, fireworks and shows that would rival those put on by the World Wrestling Federation (WWF), particularly their WrestleMania shows. Originally he wanted to hold three shows of that caliber close together, which combined with the nickname for AAA, Triple A, led to him creating the Triplemanía concept. In 1993 they only put on one Triplemanía show but in subsequent years Peña's vision for multiple Triplemanías would come true.

Peña and the AAA management staff booked the Plaza de Toros bullfighting arena for the first Triplemanía event, which was considered a huge financial gamble for a promotion that was not even one year old. The arena could normally accommodate 41,262 spectators for bullfighting, but with additional seats on the actual floor of the arena around the ring the capacity grew to over 48,000.

=== Storylines ===
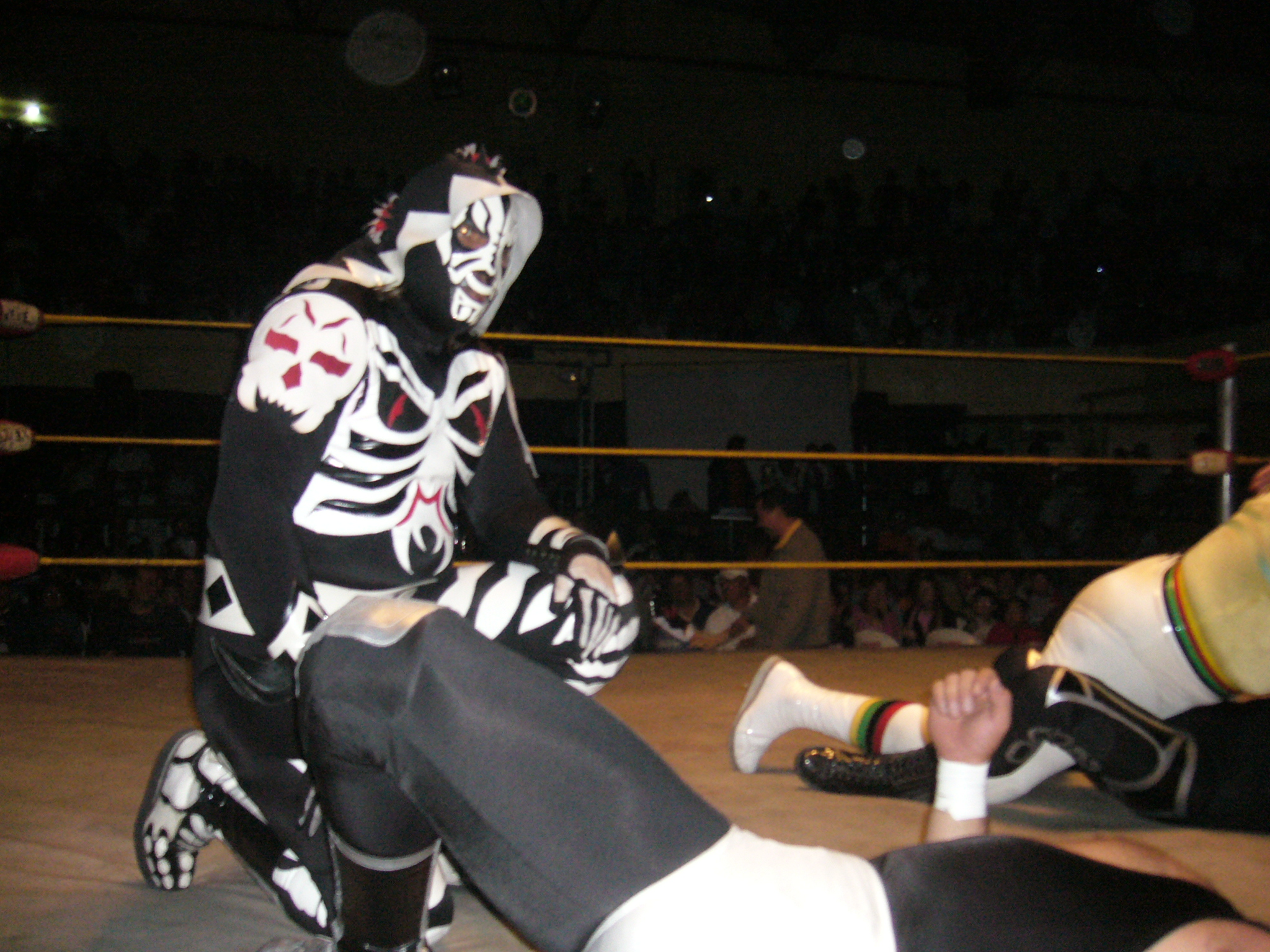
La Parka challenged for the Mexican National Light Heavyweight Championship.

The Triplemanía I event featured eight professional wrestling matches with different wrestlers involved in pre-existing scripted feuds, plots and storylines. Wrestlers were portrayed as either heels (referred to as rudos in Mexico, those that portray the "bad guys") or faces (técnicos in Mexico, the "good guy" characters) as they followed a series of tension-building events, which culminated in a wrestling match or series of matches.

"Whenever Konnan appears on TV, everyone stops what they are doing and focuses on whatever television that is around. Waitresses in restaurants will stop what they are doing and watch whatever program that Konnan appears on."

— Mike Tenay on Konnan's popularity during the broadcast of AAA When Worlds Collide.

To help make the show a success Peña relied greatly on the rivalry between Konnan and Cien Caras to sell tickets. Konnan and Cien Carasa had been rivals back when both were in CMLL, in fact Konnan had defeated Cien Caras in a tournament final to become the first CMLL World Heavyweight Champion and Caras had later won the title from Konnan, holding the title when they both jumped from CMLL to AAA. The two had previously wrestled each other in the main event of the EMLL 58th Anniversary Show (Note: CMLL was previously known as Empresa Mexicana de Lucha Libre but changed their name in 1991.) and the rivalry was a natural one between the charismatic tecnico Konnan and the cheating rudo Cien Caras, especially when he brought his brothers Universo 2000 and Máscara Año 2000 to help him gain an unfair advantage during matches. With his growing popularity Konnan was offered several roles on TV and had hopes of pursuing an acting career, which led to Peña and Konnan devising the idea of a "retirement match" stipulation for the Triplemanía main event. It was billed as if it was the first time ever such a stipulation had been used in Mexico, which was more a work of marketing than fact but was a stipulation that helped sell out the Plaza del Toros stadium.

== Event ==
Other on-screen personnel
| Role: | Name: |
|---|---|
| Commentators | Arturo Rivéra |
| Commentators | Dr. Alfonso Morales |
| Referees | Pepe Casas |
| Referees | El Tirantes |

The under-card matches were all held under "single fall" rules and not the traditional best two-out-of-three falls rule that most lucha libre matches used at that point. That stipulation was saved for the championship match, the Apuesta match and the main event. Prior to the show opening Televisa commentator Arturo Rivéra showed shots from outside the Plaza del Toros where people were being turned away as the bullfighting arena was at maximum capacity. Besides the paid attendance in La Plaza del Toros an estimated 6,000 fans watched the show from the arena's parkinglot where AAA had erected giant screen televisions to accommodate the additional fan interest.

For the Mexican National Light Heavyweight Championship match between Lizmark and La Parka Lizmark had Volador in his corner, who was the uncle of La Parka. La Parka had Solomon Grundy in his corner for the match. The title match originally ended in a 15-minute time limit draw without either wrestler even winning a single fall. Both Lizmark and La Parka requested five more minutes, which was approved by a representative of the Mexico City boxing and wrestling Commission. During the final five minutes Lizmark is able to pin La Parka and retain the championship. The mixed Trios match that pitted Máscara Sagrada, Love Machine, and Mascarita Sagrada against Jerry Estrada, Blue Panther, and Jerrito Estrada was broken down into the two main storylines; Love Machine/Blue Panther and the Sagradas against the Estradas for most of the match. In a call back to the Luchas de Apuestas match between Blue Panther and Love Machine the previous year Panther used a Kneeling reverse piledriver, a move that according to lucha libre traditions is outlawed and led to Pather's disqualification. To underscore the "lethal" nature of the move Love Machine was checked on by ringside physicians and removed from the ring on a stretcher.

During the main event cameras panned to the front row where former World Wrestling Federation (WWF, now WWE) wrestler Jake "The Snake" Roberts was seated, with the storyline explanation being that he bought a ticket to the show and was supposedly just there as a fan. During the first fall of the match Roberts kept distracting Konnan, yelling loudly and reaching out towards him as he passed by on the outside of the ring. After losing the first fall to Cien Caras Konnan got into a fight with Roberts at ringside, diverting his attention from the referee's count and failed to get back in the ring before he was counted out. Due to the count out Konnan was forced to retire and Jake Roberts immediately became one of the most hated rudo wrestlers in AAA by the end of the show.

In 2016 La Parka (second version) revealed that he was one of the wrestlers who worked the security detail for the first show.

== Aftermath ==
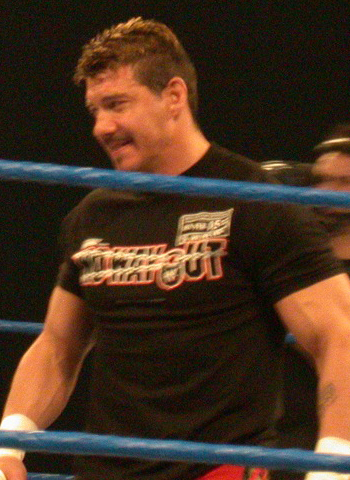
Eddy Guerrero, became a major rudo in AAA after teaming up with Love Machine.

Konnan took time off from wrestling to pursue his acting career, but it did not turn out as he had expected and Konnan returned to AAA four months later. Peña and AAA used the controversial finish to the match as a storyline to explain that Konnan had petitioned the Mexico City Boxing and Wrestling Commission to reinstate his wrestling license and allow him to return. He returned to AAA and immediately continued his feud with Cien Caras as well as continue the storyline with Jake Roberts, facing and defeating both of them at AAA's La Revencha show on August 28, 1993. The storyline would expand and pit Konnan against Robers as well as his newfound allies Eddy Guerrero and Love Machine, better known as La Pareja del Terror ("The Terror Team") while Konnan had back up in the form of Blue Panther and Perro Aguayo. Roberts and La Pareja del Terror defeated Konnan, Aguayo and Blue Panther in the main event of La Lucha del Honor in the Los Angeles Sports Arena. The storyline with Jake Robers culminated a year after it started at Triplemanía II-C, as Konnan defeated Jake Roberts in a Luchas de Apuestas match, forcing Roberts to be shaved bald.

The storyline between Blue Panther and Love Machine continued past Triplemanía, with the two facing off in another Luchas de Apuestas match two months after Triplemanía. During the match the previously tecnico Love Machine began to act more and more like one of the bad guys, berating his opponent during the match, pulling Panther's shoulders off the mat during pinfalls etc. In the end he intentionally and in full view of the referee Love Machine used the piledriver move on Blue Panther, drawing both the disqualification and disapproving boos from the crowd. While he was shaved bald as a result Love Machine did not seem to care, celebrating that he hurt Blue Panther. With one match AAA flipped the roles of Love Machine and Blue Panther, turning Panther tecnico out of sympathy and making Love Machine an arrogan anti-Mexican rudo. In a subsequent match where Love Machine and a partner wrestled La Pareja Atomica ("The Atomic Team") of El Hijo del Santo and Eddy Guerrero, Love Machine stole El Hijo del Santo's mask, put it on and then attacked Guerrero pretending to be El Hijo del Santo. Moments later he returned the mask to El Hijo del Santo and ducked out of the ring as Guerrero came to. At this point Guerrero attacked his own partner, leaving with Love Machine after the match. Together Guerrero and Love Machine would become known as La Pareja del Terror ("The Terror Team") and formed the basis of a group known as Los Gringos Locos that became the most hated rudo team, not just in AAA but in all of Mexico at the time.

=== Reception ===
John Molinario, who writes about wrestling for the Canadian Online Explorer, stated that the first Triplemanía show demonstrated that AAA "had arrived and they weren't going anywhere." He also stated that it was a "stellar card" and set the standard for lucha libre from that point on. Wrestling commentator and lucha libre expert Mike Tenay noted that "To be able to take the lion's share of the market like that so immediately sort of put AAA as a promotion on the map. Pena's own marketing plan for Mexican wrestling was so revolutionary he was on top for that era. With a promotion that was less than a year old he did a tremendous job of creating stars."

== Results ==
| No. | Results | Stipulations | Times |
|---|---|---|---|
| 1 | Martha Villalobos, Pantera Sureña and Wendy defeated Lola Gonzales, Vicky Caranza, and Larrosa | Six-woman "Lucha Libre rules" tag team match | — |
| 2 | Winners, Super Caló, and El Salsero defeated May Flowers, Rudy Reyna, and Baby Sharon. | Six-man "Lucha Libre rules" tag team match | 22:05 |
| 3^{D} | Volador, Misterioso, and Rey Misterio, Jr. defeated Los Destructores (Tony Arce, Vulcano, and Rocco Valente) | Six-man "Lucha Libre rules" tag team match | 19:35 |
| 4^{D} | Octagón, El Hijo del Santo, and Villano III defeated Fuerza Guerrera, Heavy Metal, and Rambo. | Best two-out-of-three six-man "Lucha Libre rules" tag team match | 21:18 |
| 5 | Lizmark (c) (with Volador) defeated La Parka (with Chacho Herodes) | Best two-out-of-three falls match for the Mexican National Light Heavyweight Championship | 33:56 |
| 6 | Máscara Sagrada, Love Machine, and Mascarita Sagrada defeated Jerry Estrada, Blue Panther, and Jerrito Estrada | Six-man "Lucha Libre rules" tag team match | 15:04 |
| 7 | Perro Aguayo defeated Máscara Año 2000 | Best two-out-of-three falls Lucha de Apuestas, "Hair vs. Mask" match. | 31:11 |
| 8 | Cien Caras defeated Konnan: First fall: Cien Caras pinned Konnan.; Second fall: Konnan was counted out after interference from Jake Roberts. | Best two-out-of-three falls retirement match. | 27:55 |
(c) / – the champion(s) heading into the match; D / – this was a dark match
