= Jerry Estrada =

Mexican professional wrestler (born 1958)

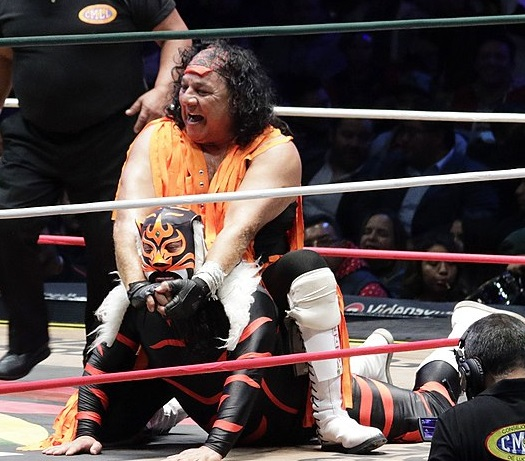
- Estrada in 2018, applying a hold on El Felino (masked)

Personal information
- Born: Gerardo Hernández Estrada; January 10, 1958 (age 68) Monclova, Coahuila, Mexico

Professional wrestling career
- Ring names: Jerry Estrada; Guardián Blanco or Halcón Blanco
- Billed height: 1.78 m (5 ft 10 in)
- Billed weight: 87 kg (192 lb)
- Trained by: Alberto Moras; Herodes; Rafael Salamanca; Gori Medina; Gran Cochisse; Franco Colombo; Enrique Llanes; Villano I; Ringo Mendoza
- Debut: 1978

Jerry Estrada (full name, Gerardo Hernández Estrada; born January 10, 1958) is a semi-retired Mexican professional wrestler. For most of his career, he has portrayed a rudo (heel, those that portray the "bad guys") character, nicknamed "El Puma". His rudo persona was pattered on various glam rock bands, complete with colorful spandex and what was described as a "rock and roll" attitude in the ring. He was originally active from 1978 until 2003, when he was forced to retire due to chronic injures caused by his signature bumps outside the ring. Estrada began working select matches again in 2018 and two matches in 2026.

Estrada was a major star for Empresa Mexicana de Lucha Libre (EMLL) during the 1980s, but was one of the first wrestlers to leave EMLL to work for Antonio Peña's newly started Asistencia Asesoría y Administración (AAA) in 1992. He also had a brief run in the World Wrestling Federation (WWF) in 1997 and 1998 when AAA and WWF had a working agreement. From 1991 to 2008, Mini-Estrella Enrique del Rio worked under the ring name Jerrito Estrada, a mini version of Jerry Estrada. Over the years, Estrada has held a number of championships for both AAA and CMLL, including the Mexican National Light Heavyweight Championship, the CMLL World Light Heavyweight Championship, the Mexican National Middleweight Championship and the Mexican National Trios Championship with Hombre Bala and Pirata Morgan, collectively known as Los Bucaneros. He also participated in the main event of Triplemanía II-A, losing a Lucha de Apuestas, or bet match, to Heavy Metal, and was forced to have all his hair shaved off as a result.

== Early life ==
Gerardo Hernández Estrada was born on January 10, 1958, in Monclova, part of the northern Mexican state of Coahuila. As a teenager, two local transit agents, who also worked part-time as professional wrestlers, offered to train Estrada, but accidentally broke Estrada's foot during their first session. While recovering, Estrada worked to support himself by selling chewing gum, polishing shoes, driving tracks and working as a line chef. During his various jobs, he met professional wrestler Herodes, who started to train him alongside notable wrestling trainer Alberto Moras.

== Professional wrestling career ==
=== EMLL/CMLL (1978–1992) ===
After his initial training under Alberto Moras and Herodes, he received further training early in his career by Rafael Salamanca, Gran Cochisse, Gori Medina Enrique Llanes, Ringo Mendoza and Alfonso Dantés. In an interview with Estrada from around his 2003 retirement, he revealed that he briefly wrestled under a masked identity, using either the name "Guardián Blanco" ("White Guardian") or "Halcón Blanco" ("White Falcon"). After unmasking, Estrada began working under the name Jerry Estrada, the only name he has used since 1978. He slowly developed a "rock and roll" style in-ring character, inspired by various early to mid-1980s bands. Most wrestlers at the time wore more traditional wrestling tights and trunks, but Estrada opted to wear black or dark colored spandex with bright colored tassels and bandanas, similar to the onstage outfit worn by glam rockers such as Twisted Sister frontman Dee Snider. Ricardo Vega, a magazine publisher, coined the nickname "El Puma" for Estrada, a nickname he used throughout his career. It led Estrada to sporadically walk to the ring with a living puma.

Not long after his in-ring debut, Estrada began working regularly for Empresa Mexicana de Lucha Libre (EMLL), the world's oldest and one of Mexico's largest wrestling promotions. Estrada won the Mexican National Middleweight Championship, his first championship, by defeating Ultraman on March 4, 1984, but lost it to Atlantis on November 30. He was slated to wrestle at the EMLL 52nd Anniversary Show on September 20, 1985, which was canceled due to the Mexico City earthquake the day before. In 1986, EMLL, as part of its emerging trios division, paired Estrada with Pirata Morgan and Hombre Bala to form Los Bucaneros ("The Buccaneers"). Estrada had his hair cut short and began wrestling wearing a faux eyepatch to complement their pirate image. Los Bucaneros defeated Kiss, Rayo de Jalisco Jr. and Ringo Mendoza to win the Mexican National Trios Championship on August 30, 1987, but lost it to Los Destructores ("The Destroyers"; Emilio Charles Jr., Tony Arce and Vulcano) on January 31, 1988. Estrada departed Los Bucaneros not long after the title loss, being replaced on the team with El Verdungo. He left the team because he wanted to shed the pirate image and return to the wrestling style of his "El Puma" character.

In 1990, EMLL created a Mini-Estrella ("Mini Star") division, and several of the small-sized wrestlers were given ring characters matching the regular-sized wrestlers; one such wrestler was Jerrito Estrada (Spanish for "Little Jerry Estrada") who heavily physically resembled Estrada and had a similar wrestling style. While he was a smaller version of Estrada, EMLL's conservative booking style kept the regular-sized wrestlers and the Mini-Estrellas from appearing or wrestling together. By late 1991, EMLL changed their name to Consejo Mundial de Lucha Libre (CMLL) and created a number of "World" championships to help usher in the new name; one such title was the CMLL World Light Heavyweight Championship. CMLL held a tournament in late 1991 that saw Estrada defeat MS-1, Mascara Año 2000 and Black Magic on his way to the finals, where he became the first champion by defeating Pierroth Jr., who eventually dethroned Estrada after 175 days with the title.

=== Asistencia Asesoría y Administración / AAA (1992–1997) ===
In early 1992, then-CMLL booker Antonio Peña decided to leave the conservative CMLL to create his own wrestling promotion, Asistencia Asesoría y Administración, later known as "AAA". Estrada was one of the first CMLL wrestlers to leave to join AAA, causing an exodus of a large number of CMLL wrestlers to AAA at the time. In AAA, Jerry and Jerrito Estrada teamed up on several occasions, including the inaugural Triplemanía on April 30, 1993, where Jerry, Jerrito and Blue Panther lost to rivals Máscara Sagrada, Mascarita Sagrada and Love Machine.

In 1994, Estrada became involved in a storyline feud with one of AAA's top tecnicos ("good guys"), Heavy Metal, with the now-veteran Estrada playing the role of the angry veteran wrestler who did not believe Heavy Metal was tough enough to be a top-level wrestler. The storyline between the two became the background for the main event of Triplemanía II-A on April 26, where Heavy Metal and Estrada faced off in a Lucha de Apuestas, or bet match. The original plan was for Heavy Metal to defeat Estrada, but for unrevealed reasons, Peña changed the finish of the match, booking Estrada to win instead. Estrada won the third fall of the match by disqualification as planned. Afterward, Heavy Metal got very emotional about the loss, the prospect of having his hair shaved off and his future in AAA, starting to cry and beg for the result to be nullified. At that point, Peña came to the ring to talk to Heavy Metal, after which the match restarted and Heavy Metal won the final fall due to Peña changing his mind on the outcome. A visibly annoyed Estrada only had a part of his hair cut off before he left the ring and went backstage. On November 6, Estrada represented AAA at When Worlds Collide, a joint AAA/World Championship Wrestling (WCW) pay-per-view where he paired with Blue Panther and La Parka, losing to 2 Cold Scorpio, The Pegasus Kid and Tito Santana.

In March 1995, Estrada defeated La Parka to win the Mexican National Light Heavyweight Championship, holding it for 131 days before losing it back to La Parka. He also worked at two of the three Triplemanía shows held that year, first at Triplemanía III-A on June 10, where Konnan, La Parka, Octagón and Perro Aguayo defeated Estrada, Cien Caras, Máscara Año 2000 and Pentagón. At Triplemanía III-C on June 30, Estrada got a small measure of revenge as he teamed with Caras, Máscara Año 2000 and Fishman to defeat Konnan, Aguayo, Latin Lover and Sagrada. The following year, he worked all three Triplemanía shows, first teaming up with Juventud Guerrera to defeat El Pantera and Super Caló at Triplemanía IV-A on May 11. Estrada, Arandu and El Sanguinario then lost to Antifaz, Latin Lover and Sergio Romo Jr. at Triplemanía IV-B on June 15. Finally, on July 15, Estrada, Fishman, May Flowers and Villano IV lost to El Mexicano, La Parka, Super Caló and Winners on the undercard of Triplemanía IV-C. On February 21, 1997, Estrada was one of the first participants in Rey de Reyes ("King of Kings"), which would become an annual tournament. In the first round, Latin Lover outlasted Estrada, Máscara Sagrada Jr. and The Killer. At Triplemanía V-A on June 13, Estrada and El Picudo were one of four teams competing in a Lucha de Apuestas, which they survived without losing their hair.

=== World Wrestling Federation (1997) ===
In early 1997, AAA began a working relationship with the North American-based World Wrestling Federation (WWF), with AAA sending several of their wrestlers to the United States to wrestle on WWF shows. Estrada made his only WWF appearance at Royal Rumble on January 19, where he teamed with Fuerza Guerrera and former rival Heavy Metal in a loss to Aguayo, El Canek and Héctor Garza.

=== Promo Azteca / World Wrestling Council (1997–1998) ===
Up until 1997, AAA and Promo Azteca had been working closely together. As the two groups split, Estrada was one of the AAA wrestlers that chose to work exclusively for Promo Azteca at the time. While Promo Azteca had a working arrangement with WCW, Estrada never appeared on a WCW show. During this time, he also worked several tours for the Puerto Rico-based World Wrestling Council (WWC), where he was part of a group called La Invasión Azteca ("The Aztec Invasion") that also included Pierroth, Rico Suave and Villano III. On November 16, he defeated Steve Corino to win the WWC Junior Heavyweight Championship. After 27 days, he lost the title to local wrestler La Ley, only to regain it on January 6, 1998. After 221 days in his second reign, Estrada lost it to El Rockero, ending his time with WWC shortly afterward.

=== AAA (1998–2003) ===
Estrada returned to AAA in 1998, notably working with them when they toured through Monterrey. On December 8, 2000, Estrada teamed with The Headhunters at Guerra de Titanes ("War of the Titans"), losing to the veteran trio of Dos Caras, El Canek and Máscara Sagráda. A year later, on September 16, 2001, Estrada, Pirata Morgan, El Texano, and El Engendro lost to La Parka Jr., Máscara Sagrada, Sangre Chicana, and Octagón on the undercard of Verano de Escándalo ("Summer of Scandal"). On September 4, 2002, Estrada and Misterioso were paired for a storyline feud with Enfermero Jr. and Pimpinela Escarlata, which led to Estrada and Misterioso having all their hair shaved off as a result of losing a Lucha de Apuestas. A month later, Estrada defeated the masked Espectro Jr. in a Lucha de Apuestas; Espectro Jr. removed the wig instead of actually unmasking. His last match for AAA took place on March 23, 2003, which saw Estrada, Garza and Pimpinela Escarlata lose to Dos Caras Jr., El Hijo del Solitario and Perro Aguayo Jr.

=== Retirement and return (2003–present) ===
In mid-2003, Estrada announced that his physical condition would force him to retire. Over the years, Estrada had become known for a move known as Salida de Bandera ("The Exit Sign"), where he would be thrown over the top rope with great height and crash to the floor. While professional wrestling is a staged event and his opponents would do their best to protect Estrada, the years of hitting the floor took a toll on his body, forcing him to retire. On May 25, Estrada teamed with former rival Pierroth and Super Crazy, losing his retirement match to Tinieblas, Perro Aguayo Jr. and Villano III. In mid-2009, the Perros del Mal wrestling promotion held a benefit show for Estrada, with a portion of the proceeds going to Estrada. It was later revealed that Estrada used a wheelchair for years after his retirement due to compounding back and knee injuries. Later that year, a Monterrey wrestling promotion known as Poder y Honor held a second benefit show to honor Estrada.

In subsequent years, Estrada improved his health through both rehabilitation and treatment enough to the point where he was able to participate in a match. On December 12, 2012, Estrada teamed with Jerrito Estrada and a wrestler known as "Ricky Estrada" to defeat long-time rival Stuka, La Parkita and Octagoncito in what was billed as his "retirement match". On August 8, 2013, Estrada came out of retirement for one more match, headlining a show billed as "Jerry Estrada's Retirement Show". He, Gato Fantasma and Silencio defeated Memo, Rey Demonio Jr. and Stuka. By 2018, Estrada's health and mobility had improved to the point that he competed in a total of five matches that year. On November 30, Estrada wrestled his first match in Arena México in 26 years, teaming with veteran wrestlers Fuerza Guerrera and Negro Casas in a loss to El Solar, El Felino and Mano Negra at CMLL Leyendas Mexicanas ("Mexican Legends"). His last match to date saw him defeat Stuka on March 3, 2019.

== Championships and accomplishments ==
- Asistencia Asesoría y Administración / AAA
  - Mexican National Light Heavyweight Championship (1 time) (Note: the Mexican National Light Heavyweight Championship is sanctioned by the Mexico City Boxing and Wrestling Commission, but promoted by AAA at the time.)
  - IWAS World Tag Team Championship (1 time) – with Juventud Guerrera
- Consejo Mundial de Lucha Libre / Empresa Mexicana de Lucha Libre
  - CMLL World Light Heavyweight Championship (1 time)
  - Mexican National Middleweight Championship (1 time) (Note: The Mexican National Middleweight Championship was sanctioned by the Mexico City Boxing and Wrestling Commission, but promoted by EMLL / CMLL at the time.)
  - Mexican National Trios Championship (1 time) – with Hombre Bala and Pirata Morgan (Note: The Mexican National Trios Championship is sanctioned by the Mexico City Boxing and Wrestling Commission, but promoted by EMLL / CMLL.)
- International Wrestling All-Stars
  - IWAS Tag Team Championship (1 time) – with Juventud Guerrera
- World Wrestling Council
  - WWC World Junior Heavyweight Championship (2 times)
- Pro Wrestling Illustrated
  - PWI ranked him # 75 of the 500 best singles wrestlers of the PWI 500 in 1998.

== Luchas de Apuestas record ==
| Winner (wager) | Loser (wager) | Location | Event | Date | Notes |
|---|---|---|---|---|---|
| Jerry Estrada (hair) | Gran Cochisse | N/A | Live event | N/A | |
| Jerry Estrada (hair) | Cachorro Mendoza (hair) | Mexico City, Mexico | Live event | Unknown | |
| Jerry Estrada (hair) | Tony Arce (hair) | Mexico City, Mexico | Live event | February 28, 1982 | |
| Chamaco Valaguez (hair) | Jerry Estrada (hair) | Mexico City, Mexico | Domingos de Coliseo | January 23, 1983 | |
| Jerry Estrada (hair) | Franco Colombo (hair) | Mexico City, Mexico | Super Viernes | July 1, 1983 | |
| Jerry Estrada (hair) | Javier Llanes (hair) | Mexico City, Mexico | Super Viernes | August 12, 1983 | |
| Cachorro Mendoza (hair) | Jerry Estrada (hair) | Mexico City, Mexico | Live event | September 25, 1983 | |
| Los Misioneros de la Muerte (hair) (El Signo, El Texano and Negro Navarro) | El Dandy, Talismán and Jerry Estrada (hair) | Mexico City, Mexico | Live event | September 5, 1986 | |
| Jerry Estrada (hair) | Ultraman (hair) | Unknown | Live event | 1988 | |
| Jerry Estrada (hair) | Kato Kung Lee (hair) | Mexico City, Mexico | Live event | 1989 | |
| Jerry Estrada (hair) | Javier Cruz (hair) | Mexico City, Mexico | Super Viernes | October 20, 1989 | |
| El Satánico (hair) | Jerry Estrada (hair) | Mexico City, Mexico | Live event | March 23, 1990 | |
| Jerry Estrada (hair) | La Fiera (hair) | Mexico City, Mexico | Live event | September 8, 1991 | |
| Heavy Metal (hair) | Jerry Estrada (hair) | Aguascalientes, Aguascalientes | Triplemanía II-A | April 26, 1994 | |
| Jerry Estrada (hair) | Stuka (hair) | Monclova, Coahuila | AAA Sin Limite | October 30, 1994 | |
| Jerry Estrada (hair) | Stuka (hair) | Nuevo Laredo, Tamaulipas | Live event | June 19, 2000 | |
| Pimpinela Escarlata and Hijo del Enfermero (hair) | Jerry Estrada and Misterioso (hair) | Tijuana, Baja California | Live event | October 4, 2002 | |
| Jerry Estrada (hair) | Espectro Jr. (hair) | Monterrey, Nuevo León | AAA Sin Limite | November 3, 2002 | (Note: Espectro, Jr. removed the wig that was attached to his mask, not his actual hair.) |
