= Misterioso (wrestler) =

American professional wrestler

Personal information
- Born: Roberto Castillo; May 26, 1966 (age 60) Los Angeles, California, United States

Professional wrestling career
- Ring name(s): Rey Misterio II (1st. Version); The Centipede; The Predator; Misterioso
- Billed height: 1.72 m (5 ft 7 1/2 in)
- Billed weight: 88 kg (194 lb)
- Billed from: Tijuana, Baja California, Mexico
- Trained by: Rey Misterio Sr.
- Debut: March 10, 1988

Roberto Castillo (born May 26, 1966) is an American professional wrestler working on the independent circuit in Mexico and Southern California under the ring name Misterioso (Mysterious). Together with Volador, Misterioso formed one of the most popular and talented teams in Mexico in the early to mid-1990s.

== Biography ==
Castillo was born in Los Angeles in 1966, son of Mexican emigrants. Growing up he was a big fan of the Lucha libre movies starring El Santo, Blue Demon and Mil Mascaras. When he was old enough he joined the Marine Corps.

=== Professional wrestling career ===
After ending his stint in the Marines Castillo travelled to Tijuana, Baja California. While shopping for wrestling masks for a friend he met someone who created outfits for wrestlers, who in turn introduced Castillo to Rey Misterio who quickly agreed to train Castillo. Castillo made his debut on March 10, 1988, wrestling as "Rey Misterio II", given the great honor by his mentor.

==== Consejo Mundial de Lucha Libre ====
In mid-1990 Castillo travelled to Mexico City and began working for Consejo Mundial de Lucha Libre (CMLL). In CMLL he was repackaged as "Misterioso" ("mysterious") modifying the "Rey Misterio II" character since the original Misterio did not work for CMLL. Castillo wore a very colorful, creative mask unlike what was generally used at the time, helping usher in some of the more elaborate masks used in Lucha Libre today. His career was put on hold as he was recalled to the Marines, serving for three months before returning to CMLL. On December 8, 1991, defeated Fuerza Guerrera, in what was described as a surprise, to win the NWA World Welterweight Championship In 1992 Misterioso began training together with Volador. CMLL booker Antonio Peña noticed how well the two worked together and decided to make them a permanent tag team. The team immediately started began working a storyline feud with Los Destructores (the brother team of Tony Arce and Vulcano). On March 8, 1992, Misterioso and Volador defeated Los Destructores to win the Mexican National Tag Team Championship.

==== Asistencia Asesoría y Administración ====
In mid-1992 EMLL booker Antonio Peña decided to break away from EMLL and form his own promotion Asistencia Asesoría y Administración (AAA) and took a number of EMLL wrestlers with him. Misterioso and Volador were among the wrestlers who were loyal to Peña and left with him, taking the Mexican National Tag Team titles with them to AAA (Note: This was possible because EMLL technically did not own the championship, the Mexico City Wrestling and Boxing commission owned them and allowed EMLL to book the titles. the Commission gave AAA the rights to the championship in 1992.) The team held the belts until August 28, 1992, where they lost them to Los Destructores as part of a rivalry that had carried over from CMLL to AAA. Volador and Misterioso would regain the titles, but ultimately lost the belts on February 12, 1993. In AAA Misterioso and Volador began teaming up with Rey Misterio, Jr. (nephew of Rey Misterio) to form a team called La Tercia del Aire ("The Trio of the Air"). The team took on and defeated Los Destructores, now a trio with Rocco Valente making up the third member, at AAA's first ever Triplemanía event. On August 29, 1993, Misterioso defeated Huichol to become the first ever IWC World Middleweight Championship.

In March, 1994 Misterioso turned on Volador during a trios match, turning Rudo (Bad guy) for the first time in his career. Misterioso formed a unit with Fuerza and Juventud Guerrera taking on Volador with various partners. At Triplemanía II-A Misterioso and the Guerreras defeated Volador, Latin Lover and El Mexicano. Triplemanía II-B saw the trio defeat Volador, Rey Misterio, Jr. and Rey Misterio. and finally at Triplemanía II-C Volador teamed with Tinieblas, Jr. and Lizmark, Jr. to finally gain a victory over Misterioso as he teamed up with Love Machine and Miguel Pérez, Jr. During this time Misterioso became a part of Los Gringos Locos, filling in when members wrestled in Japan. On November 27, 1994, Misterioso lost the IWC Middleweight title to Rey Misterio, Jr. By late 1994 Misterioso's knees were in such bad shape he could no longer wrestle the style he used to and turned to hardcore wrestling instead. One of his trademarks was the use of a dinner fork, earning him the nickname El Rey del Tenedor, King of the Fork. The storyline between Misterioso and Volador played out over a long period of time, culminating in a Lucha de Apuesta match on July 15, 1995, where both men put their masks on the line. The event drew a crowd of 16,000 people to El Torero de Tijuana for a very profitable show. During the match Misterioso's cornerman Blue Panther attempted to injure Volador (in storyline terms) with a Martinete (piledriver). Misterioso came to the aid of his former friend, saving him from Blue Panther but ended up knocked out by a chair shot to the head. Out of respect for his former partner and in appreciation of what he had just done Volador dragged the unconscious Misterioso on top of himself and allowed the referee to count to three. Following the match Misteriosos pleaded with Volador not to remove the mask but Volador was a man of his word and unmasked. Following the mask loss Misterioso and Volador reunited, wrestling as a team until 1997 when both wrestlers left AAA.

=== Independent Circuit ===
Following his stint in AAA Misterioso began working on the Southern California independent circuit, wrestling for companies such as Revolution Pro, Alternate Wrestling Show and Lucha VaVOOM. At one point he was in talks to work for World Championship Wrestling but nothing came of it in the end. On July 4, 2009, Misterioso and Volador reunited for the Luchas 2000 Magazine 9th anniversary show, losing to Brazo de Oro and Brazo de Platino.

== Championships and accomplishments ==
- Alternative Wrestling Show
  - AWS Tag Team Championship (1 time) – with Super Boy
- Asistencia Asesoría y Administración
  - IWC World Middleweight Championship (1 time)
  - Mexican National Tag Team Championship (2 times) – with Volador (Note: During their reign as Tag Team champions Volador and Misterioso left CMLL to join AAA, taking the championship with them, Misterioso is a two time Tag Team champion.)
- Empresa Mexicana de Lucha Libre
  - NWA World Welterweight Championship (1 time)
- Local promotions
  - Baja California Tag Team Championship (1 time) – with Rey Misterio

== Lucha de Apuesta record ==
Winner (wager)	Loser (wager)	Location	Event	Date	Notes
Rey Misterio II (mask)	Atlántico (mask)	Tijuana, Baja California	Live event	1989	
Misterioso(mask)	Vulcano(hair)	Mexico City	Live event	October 1, 1993	(Note: This was a triangle match that also included Huichol)
Misterioso(mask)	Volador(mask)	Tijuana, Baja California	Live event	July 14, 1995	
Rey Misterio Jr.	Misterioso (mask)	Tijuana, Baja California	Live event	December 19, 1997	
El Hijo del Santo (mask)	Misterioso (hair)	Anaheim, California	Live event	September 5, 1999	
Príncipe Arandú (hair)	Misterioso (hair)	Tijuana, Baja California	Live event	August 17, 2001	(Note: This was a triangle 'bull terrier' (chain) match that also included Tornado Negro)
Pimpinela Escarlata and Hijo del Enfermero (hair)	Jerry Estrada and Misterioso (hair)	Tijuana, Baja California	Live event	October 4, 2002	
Latin Lover (hair)	Misterioso (hair)	Tijuana, Baja California	Live event	October 17, 2003	
El Hijo del Solitario (mask)	Misterioso (hair)	Nuevo Laredo, Tamaulipas	Live event	October 31, 2003	
Místico (mask)	Misterioso (hair)	Tijuana, Baja California	Live event	October 7, 2007	
Volador Jr. (mask)	Misterioso (hair)	Reynosa, Tamaulipas	Live event	November 30, 2008	(Note: Relevos Suicidas match: Misterioso and Misterioso II lost to Volador and Volador, Jr.)
