= AAA Sin Límite =

- Genre: Professional wrestling Sports entertainment
- Created by: Antonio Peña
- Starring: AAA roster
- Country of origin: Mexico
- Original language: Spanish

Production
- Production companies: AAA; Televisa

Original release
- Network: Televisa Deportes
- Release: May 17, 1992 – February 1, 2019

Related
- Lucha Libre AAA on Fox

AAA Sin Límite is a Mexican professional wrestling television program produced by the Lucha Libre AAA Worldwide (originally Asistencia, Asesoría y Administración de Espectáculos; (Note: Most commonly written simply as Asistencia, Asesoría y Administración.) AAA) promotion which aired from 1992 to 2019 on Televisa Deportes, with its premiere episode debuting on May 17, 1992.

== History ==
Between April and May of 1992, Antonio Peña, booker of the Mexico City-based Consejo Mundial de Lucha Libre (CMLL), broke with the promotion in favor of establishing his own group, along with Konnan and much of the younger talent from CMLL. This split resulted in the founding of the Televisa-backed Asistencia, Asesoría y Administración de Espectáculos (AAA) promotion. AAA would look for talent from markets outside Mexico City, as they found and signed Tijuana natives Rey Misterio Sr., Rey Misterio Jr., and Psicosis. The promotion became known for signing top talent away from CMLL, such as El Hijo del Santo, Octagón, Blue Panther, Heavy Metal, Cien Caras, and Perro Aguayo. The promotion's first event would take place on May 15, 1992 and aired on May 17, 1992 on tape delay as the first episode of the promotion's Sin Límite weekly program on Televisa Deportes. On July 4, 1992, the promotion taped its first show outside of Mexico when they held a taping at the campus of California State University, Los Angeles in Los Angeles, California which aired on July 12, 1992. On December 26, 1993, AAA aired its first special for the program titled La Lucha del Honor which was taped on November 12, 1993 at the Los Angeles Memorial Sports Arena. In 1993, AAA's TripleMania II-A, B, and C events were taped and aired as episodes of Sin Límite. On September 14, 1997, AAA taped the inaugural Verano de Escándalo event which aired as an episode of Sin Límite on October 6, 1997.

On February 1, 2019, AAA announced the end of their relationship with Televisa after 27 years, with the promotion's programming moving to the Multimedios television station. On February 3, AAA announced that they had reached an agreement with TV Azteca to broadcast their lucha libre programming on Azteca 7. AAA programming would later move to various broadcast partners. On November 25, 2025, AAA, now a subsidiary of American promotion WWE, announced a media rights agreement with Fox, which will see weekly its programming air on Fox properties in Mexico and Latin America beginning in 2026. The deal would also allow for special events like Rey de Reyes to be aired on the network beginning with their 2026 editions. AAA and WWE held their inaugural Lucha Libre AAA on Fox episode on January 17, 2026 at Gimnasio Olímpico Juan de la Barrera in Mexico City.

== Roster ==
The wrestlers featured on AAA Sin Límite took part in scripted feuds and storylines. Wrestlers portrayed heroic characters (técnicos in Mexico), villains (referred to as rudos in Mexico), or less distinguishable characters in scripted events that built tension and culminated in a wrestling match on Sin Límite.

Arturo "El Rudo" Rivera and Dr. Alfonso Morales were notable commentators for Sin Límite.
