= AAA When Worlds Collide =

Professional wrestling pay-per-view event

- Official Logo of the show.
- Promotion(s): Asistencia Asesoría y Administración; World Championship Wrestling
- Date: November 6, 1994
- City: Los Angeles, California
- Venue: Los Angeles Memorial Sports Arena
- Attendance: 13,000 (sold out)

AAA events chronology
← Previous; Triplemania II-C	Next → Triplemania III-A

WCW events chronology
← Previous; Halloween Havoc	Next → Starrcade

When Worlds Collide (Spanish: Cuando Los Mundos Chocan) was a professional wrestling pay-per-view (PPV) event that took place on November 6, 1994, at the Los Angeles Memorial Sports Arena in Los Angeles, California. It was scripted and produced by the Mexican professional wrestling company Asistencia Asesoría y Administración (AAA), now known as Lucha Libre AAA Worldwide, and was promoted on the broadcast as a co-production with the International Wrestling Council (IWC), the promotional name used for AAA shows in the United States. The show was produced by the technical staff of World Championship Wrestling (WCW). WCW Executive Vice-President Eric Bischoff had helped AAA secure the show to be broadcast by American pay-per-view providers, marking the first time a non-American-based wrestling promotion was shown live on American PPV television. The show was broadcast in both English and Spanish. Chris Cruise and Mike Tenay called the action in English, while Arturo Rivera and Andrés Maroñas handled the Spanish announcing. This event also marked Tenay's first commentating role in professional wrestling.

The PPV is considered the first time most viewers in the United States were exposed to the lucha libre style of wrestling, and contributed to several AAA workers, especially Eddie Guerrero, Rey Misterio Jr., Konnan, Psicosis, and Juventud Guerrera, working regularly in the United States for promotions such as Extreme Championship Wrestling (ECW), World Championship Wrestling, and the World Wrestling Federation/World Wrestling Entertainment (WWF, later WWE). The show is also notable for being the last appearance by Art Barr, who died 17 days later.

The main event of the show was a steel cage match between long-time rivals Konnan and Perro Aguayo, while the semi-main event was a tag team Lucha de Apuestas, Mask vs. Hair match between the popular duo of Octagón and El Hijo del Santo taking on La Pareja del Terror ("The Terror Team"; Art Barr and Eddie Guerrero). While not the main event of the show, the semi-main event was rated 5 stars by the Wrestling Observer Newsletter, which also voted La Pareja del Terror the Team of the Year and Art Barr the Heel of the Year. After the match, Barr and Guerrero first cut off each other's hair and then had the last of it shaved off as a result of their loss.

== Background ==
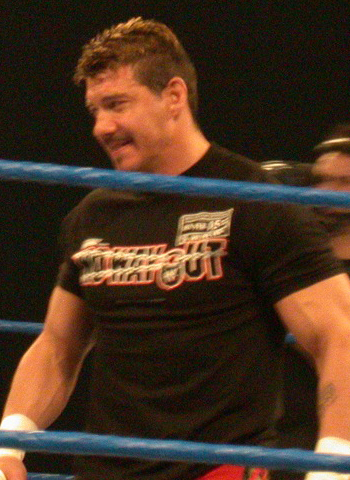
Eddie Guerrero (in 2004) part of La Pareja del Terror

The event featured five professional wrestling matches with different wrestlers involved in pre-existing, scripted feuds, plots, and storylines. Wrestlers were portrayed as either heels (referred to as rudos in Mexico, those that portray the "bad guys") or faces (técnicos in Mexico, the "good guy" characters) as they followed a series of tension-building events, which culminated in a wrestling match or series of matches.

The driving storyline behind When Worlds Collide was the emergence and dominance of a group known as Los Gringos Locos, who had become the top rudo group in AAA. Initially after joining AAA, Eddie Guerrero had teamed up with El Hijo del Santo to form a tag team known as La Pareja Atomics "("The Atomic Team"), with AAA booker Antonio Peña invoking the fact that their famous fathers, Gory Guerrero and El Santo, had formed a very successful tag team in the past. The Los Gringos Locos storyline began as Art Barr started to convince Guerrero that he was in the shadow of Hijo del Santo, just like his father had been in the shadow of El Santo. The storyline tension between the tag team partners was bolstered by the fact that Guerrero and Hijo del Santo did not get along behind the scenes, but teamed up because it made sense business-wise. After some prodding by Barr, Guerrero turned on his partner and joined with Barr to form a team that became known as La Pareja del Terror ("The Terror Team"), but also earned the nickname Los Gringos Locos after a commentator stated that "those Gringos are Loco".

With the turn, Peña wanted the team to play up their "Americanness", with Barr and Guerrero wrestling in red, white, and blue gear and the two reminding the audience that the "American way" was better, as they cheated their way to victory. El Hijo del Santo received backup in the form of Octagón, a very popular masked técnico who had starred in several Lucha Libre Films in the past. The feud between the two teams would evolve into Barr and Guerrero recruiting other wrestlers, most importantly Konnan, who up until joining Los Gringos Locos was one of the most popular técnicos in Mexico. They were also joined by Madonna's Boyfriend, Black Cat, and Chicano Power, forming what was the first real "stable" in Mexico.

Guerrero and Barr focused on Hijo del Santo and Octagón, using Los Gringos as backup whenever they needed them. On November 5, 1993, Hijo del Santo and Octagón defeated La Pareja del Terror to become the first team to hold the AAA World Tag Team Championship.

On July 23, 1994, La Pareja del Terror won the tag team titles, with the storyline being that the duo had paid off the referee to call the match in their favor. The referee, known as "El Tirantes" (the Suspenders), became a rudo referee from that day on. The "theft" of the tag team championship led Hijo del Santo and Octagón to lay down what is considered the ultimate challenge in Lucha Libre, a Lucha de Apuestas, or bet match. For the match, Hijo del Santo and Octagón would "bet" their masks against the hair of Barr and Guerrero, a challenge that La Pareja del Terror eagerly accepted, and the match was set for the When Worlds Collide show in Los Angeles.

The other Los Gringos Locos-related storyline started when Konnan joined sides with Barr and Guerrero, switching from being a tecnico that was highly favored by the crowd to being a hated rudo, as he turned on his long-time partner Perro Aguayo in a match against Los Gringos Locos in August 1994. The storyline played off the fact that years previously, Perro Aguayo had forced Konnan to unmask when he pinned Konnan in a Luchas de Apuestas match in CMLL. Konnan and Aguayo would face off several times over the following months, often as the captains in six-man tag team matches, most of which ended with inconclusive outcomes and both wrestlers hitting each other with chairs and other objects. On August 6, 1994, on a show called Night of Champions in the Los Angeles Sports Arena, Konnan teamed up with Jake "The Snake" Roberts to defeat the team of Aguayo and Vampiro Canadiense in two straight falls. After the match, the two enemies agreed to a steel cage match, which would be the main event of When Worlds Collide.

The third match on the show was billed as "AAA vs. IWC", presented as an inter-promotional match between the Mexican AAA and the US-based International Wrestling Council (IWC). IWC was the promotional name used for AAA shows in the United States, which meant they were not two separate entities behind the scenes. For this match, the IWC representatives were three wrestlers who had not worked for AAA, only IWC, as the Canadian Pegasus Kid teamed up with 2 Cold Scorpio and Tito Santana in Santana's highest profile match after leaving the World Wrestling Federation. The rudo trio of Blue Panther, La Parka, and Jerry Estrada represented AAA in a match where the lead up to the show focused more on the issues between La Parka and Estrada in the months prior to When Worlds Collide. La Parka had won the Mexican National Light Heavyweight Championship on September 4, 1994, which led to Parka's regular partner Estrada starting to ask for a title match, feeling that he had earned one. In the weeks prior to When Worlds Collide, the fans had begun to support La Parka, taking to his more comedic wrestling style and very distinctive skeleton body suit and mask, sowing the seeds for La Parka potentially turning to the tecnico side, but prior to this point he was still working the rudo side.

The second match of the show centered around one of the classic tropes in Lucha Libre in which one or more young wrestlers tried to earn the respect of veteran wrestlers, often with the veteran wrestlers portraying the rudo role and putting the rookies "in their place". In this case, the "veteran" was Fuerza Guerrera, who felt that the 19-year-old Rey Misterio Jr. had not earned his sport, pushing for his own son, Juventud Guerrera, as the future superstar of Lucha Libre. The Guerreras were also involved in a long-running storyline against the then-reigning Mexican National Tag Team Champions Heavy Metal and Latin Lover over the championship. The Guerreras had aligned themselves with Psicosis, a peer of Juventud Guerrera, who fought Rey Misterio Jr. on several occasions before the two of them joined AAA. For unexplained reasons, Fuerza Guerrera and Psicosis were not teamed up with Juventud Guerrera for the show but instead were teamed with Gringo Loco member Madonna's Boyfriend for the match against Heavy Metal, Latin Lover, and Rey Misterio Jr.

The opening match was another chapter in a long-running storyline between two of AAA's top Mini-Estrellas, Mascarita Sagrada and Espectrito, a storyline that actually predated the creation of AAA in 1992. The tecnico Sagrada and the rudo Espectrito had been booked as rivals from the beginning of Consejo Mundial de Lucha Libre's (CMLL) Mini-Estrella division, as established by Antonio Peña when he worked for CMLL. Mascarita Sagrada defeated Espectrito in the tournament to determine the first-ever CMLL World Mini-Estrella Champion in what was one of the early highlights of their storyline feud. When Peña decided to break away from CMLL to create AAA, a large part of the Mini-Estrellas division left with him, including the champion Mascarita Sagrada and Espectrito, vacating the championship in the process. In AAA Peña got the Mexico City Boxing and Wrestling Commission to sanction the creation of the Mexican National Mini-Estrella Championship, a title that Espectrito won by defeating Mascarita Sagrada in the finals of a tournament.

Mascarita Sagrada defeated Espectrito on April 16, 1993, as their feud continued to develop. Espectrito played a part in Mascarita Sagrada losing the championship to Jerrito Estrada on February 4, 1994. At this point in time, the storyline was expanded to also include Octagoncito as well as Jerrito Estrada and saw Octagoncito defeat Estrada to become the fourth Mexican National Mini-Estrella Champion. The highlight of the Mascarita Sagrada/Espectrito storyline came on the "Night of Champions" on August 6, 1994, when the two faced off in a Luchas de Apuestas match with their masks on the line. After splitting the first two falls, Espectrito was caught cheating in the third fall, losing the match by disqualification and being forced to unmask afterwards.

== Event ==
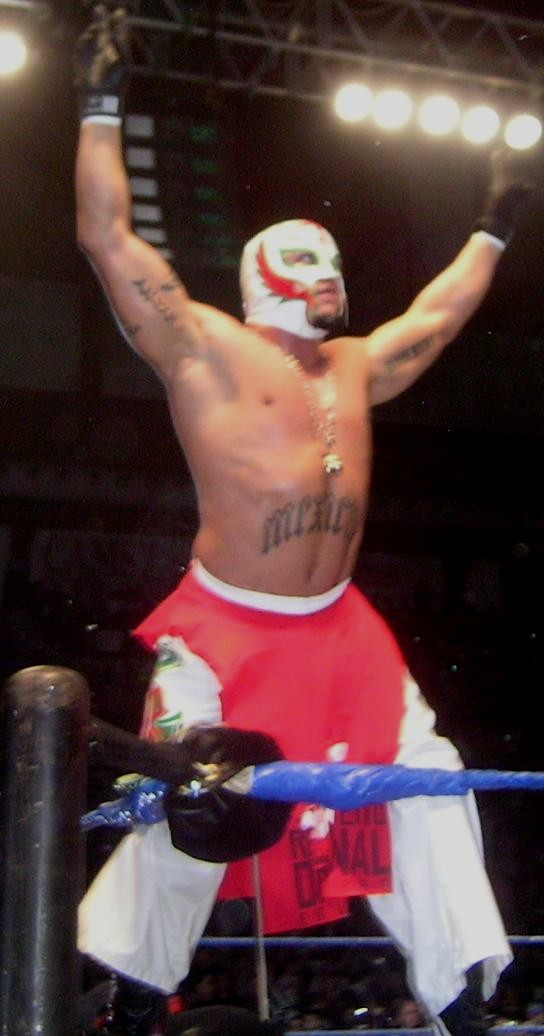
Rey Misterio Jr. (in 2005), on the losing side of the second match of the night

Other on-screen personnel
Role:	Name:
Spanish Language Commentators	Arturo Rivéra
Spanish Language Commentators	Andres Maroñas
English Language Commentators	Mike Tenay
English Language Commentators	Chris Cruise

Prior to the start of the show, the producers from WCW/Turner Broadcasting System made several changes to the format, including reducing the overall time by 40 minutes. This forced AAA to change the first three matches from the traditional best-of-three falls to a single fall. The producers also cut back on the elaborate entrances that AAA usually had for their major shows and did not allow AAA to have a dark match before the broadcast started to rev up the crowd. The producers also pushed to change the semi-main event to a singles match between El Hijo del Santo and Eddie Guerrero, but in the end, the match went on as originally planned and advertised.

The opening Mini-Estrellas tag team match featured fast, high-flying action from all four wrestlers, with Octagoncito starting out easily controlling the match against both his opponents, but when the 1.35 m (4 ft 5 in), 42 kg (93 lb) Sagrada tagged in the much larger opponents (Espectrito 1.45 m (4 ft 9 in), 65 kg (143 lb), Estrada 1.56 m (5 ft 1 1/2 in), 75 kg (165 lb) (Note: Jerrito Estrada is an example that illustrates that not all Mini-Estrellas have Dwarfism but can be wrestlers who are simply shorter than average.)) used their size advantage to control the match. During the match, the four demonstrated that their smaller size allowed them to wrestle at a faster pace and perform moves not expected of people of their stature, including a dive through the ropes to the floor and leaps off the top rope. The end came when Espectrito slipped on the top turnbuckle and landed awkwardly on the top rope; moments later, Mascarita Sagrada pinned his long-time rival while Octagoncito forced Jerrito Estrada to submit to La Escalera, a Russian leg sweep into an armbar submission.

For the second match, Fuerza Guerrera was designated the captain of the rudo team while Heavy Metal served as the captain of the tecnico team. To win the match, a team would either pin or force the captain to submit, or pin both of the other team members. The two captains started off the match fighting each other before Rey Misterio Jr. and Psicosis quickly took over. Under the Lucha Libre rules, a tag team partner can enter the ring when the other wrestler tags out or leaves the ring, unlike normal tag team rules. At one point, Rey Misterio Jr. threw Psicosis to the outside; Psicosis then ran away from ringside to avoid falling victim to a diving attack from his opponent. Moments later, Madonna's Boyfriend entered the ring and used his superior size to throw Rey Misterio Jr. around before Latin Lover took over for him. After about 10 more minutes of wrestling, Heavy Metal missed a dive, which Fuerza Guerrera took advantage of by locking in an arm submission hold that quickly caused Heavy Metal to tap out. In Lucha Libre, submissions quickly end the first or second fall, but in this case, the end came off so quickly that the announcers questioned if this had turned into a best-of-three falls match. This was one clear example of how plans had changed from three falls to one right before the show.

In the third match of the night, "Pegasus Kid" Chris Benoit was the captain on the IWC team which also included 2 Cold Scorpio and Tito Santana. This was Santana's first PPV appearance since leaving the World Wrestling Federation. Blue Panther was the captain of the AAA team, having the task of trying to keep the peace between his partners La Parka and Jerry Estrada, as they had not been getting along in the weeks leading up to the match. The dissension started early on, as La Parka took offense to Estrada quickly stepping on the apron to let La Parka start the match. To counter, La Parka stepped out on the apron next to Estrada as well, leaving a confused Blue Panther to step back inside the ring while his teammates squabbled on the apron. Later on, as La Parka tried to pin his opponent, Estrada interfered and broke up the pinfall attempt and instead tried to be the one to win for his team. The two took turns throwing each other off their opponent, trying to win the match for their team while a confused Blue Panther looked on. Late in the match, it appeared as though Estrada and La Parka had put their differences aside, as Estrada held Tito Santana outside the ring, motioning for La Parka to dive onto Santana. When La Parka dove out of the ring, Santana moved and La Parka hit Estrada instead, which caused the two partners to fight. Moments later, 2 Cold Scorpio dove off the top rope to the floor, knocking down La Parka, Estrada, and Santana with the move. This left the two captains in the ring fighting it out until Pegasus Kid was able to roll up Blue Panther for the victory. After the match. the IWC team and Blue Panther left the ring while La Parka and Estrada fought each other, with the crowd solidly behind La Parka.

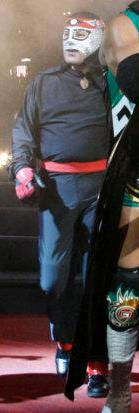
Octagón, who teamed up with El Hijo del Santo.

The tag team Luchas de Apuestas match was the only match of the night conducted under best two-out-of-three falls rules. During their introductions, Art Barr made "swimming" motions as the team walked down the aisle, mockingly invoking the image of illegal immigrants swimming across the Rio Grande to incite the Mexican attendees in the crowd. Barr and Guerrero had Madonna's Boyfriend in their corner while Hijo del Santo and Octagón had Blue Panther in their corner, playing off Panther's past history with Barr. La Pareja del Terror tried to take control of the match early by attacking their opponents before the bell had even rung, but were quickly tossed out of the ring as the US crowd began to chant "Mexico". Once the match actually started, Hijo del Santo and Guerrero started off the match. After just a few minutes of wrestling, Barr lifted Hijo del Santo up on his shoulders, allowing Guerrero to leap off the top, taking Hijo del Santo down with a Huracanrana head scissors takedown, followed by a quick pinfall. Under the rules, that was not the end of the first fall, as both wrestlers on a team had to be pinned or forced to submit to end the fall. Moments later, Guerrero threw Octagón off the top rope with a Superplex, placing him in position for Barr to perform a Frog Splash diving move off a different turnbuckle to pin Octagón for the first fall.

Between the first and second falls, Barr began to mockingly perform jumping jacks in the ring, showing how little physical exertion it took to win the first fall. This was followed by Guerrero once again mocking the Mexican crowd by pretending to be swimming to infuriate the crowd. Guerrero and Hijo del Santo started out the second fall as they had the first, locking up in the center of the ring. When Octagón entered the ring, Guerrero dropped to his knees, feigning an apology for a moment, before poking Octagón in the eye to gain the advantage. Later on, Hijo del Santo entered the ring and all four men ended up in the ring at the same time, until the tecnico team sent La Pareja del Terror to the floor, followed by a double Topé Suicida (Suicide dive headbutt) by Hijo del Santo and Octagón. Later in the match, Guerrero performed a Huracanrana with Hijo del Santo sitting on the top rope and gained a pinfall, leaving Octagón at a disadvantage in the second fall. Barr and Guerrero double-teamed Octagón, with Barr throwing Octagón up on the air, thinking Guerrero caught him for a move. Instead, Octagón rolled up Guerrero for the pinfall as Barr celebrated, mistakenly thinking Guerrero got the pinfall. Moments later, the unsuspecting Barr was rolled up into Octagón's trademark submission hold La Escalera and was forced to submit, tying the match at one fall each.

As in falls one and two, Guerrero and Hijo del Santo started out against each other. At one point, Guerrero applied Hijo del Santo's own submission hold, La de a Caballo (camel clutch), on him to mock his opponent, but was not able to make Hijo del Santo submit before Octagón saved his partner. Later in the fall, with the referee distracted, Barr was able to surprise Octagón and execute a kneeling reverse piledriver, a move that would have been an automatic disqualification in Lucha Libre. Moments later, Barr was able to pin Octagón to eliminate him from the match. In Lucha Libre, the piledriver is treated as a very dangerous move, something that was sold during this match by Octagón being taken from the arena on a stretcher during the closing moments of the third fall. Minutes later, Hijo del Santo was actually able to kick out of the Superplex/Frog Splash combo by La Pareja del Terror. At one point, both Hijo del Santo and Guerrero were on the floor, which distracted the referee long enough for Blue Panther to enter the ring and perform a piledriver of his own on Barr in retaliation for what was done to Octagón. The move was not seen by the referee but allowed Hijo del Santo to pin Barr, leaving just Hijo del Santo and Guerrero still in the match. A minute or two later, Hijo del Santo was able to roll up Guerrero for the final pinfall and the victory for his team. Following their loss, both Guerrero and Barr visibly cried in the ring, selling the severeness of the loss as they cut off each other's hair with a pair of scissors. This was followed by an AAA official shaving off the rest of their hair with electric clippers backstage.

The main event steel cage match could be won only by climbing over the top of the cage all the way to the floor to win the match. Pinfalls and submission did not count, neither opponent could be disqualified, and the door to the cage would be locked for the entire match. As the cage lowered, Mike Tenay introduced the match and then handed the microphone over to AAA announcer Arturo Rivera to give the introductions in Spanish. Konnan came to the ring with both the IWC World Heavyweight Championship and the UWA Double Power Cup Championship that he had won from Perro Aguayo, although neither was on the line in the match. Once the door was locked, the two wrestlers began to brawl, with Aguayo trying to use Konnan as a ladder to climb out of the cage on more than one occasion. After a few minutes of fighting, Konnan dropped Aguayo face-first on the wire mesh cage, causing Aguayo to bleed (either by sheer impact or Aguayo secretly cutting himself to sell the brutality of the match). Once Aguayo started to bleed, Konnan began to focus on attacking Aguayo's forehead, including rubbing Aguayo's face across the cage. Moments later, both wrestlers found themselves on the top rope, fighting each other as they held on to the cage until Aguayo knocked Konnan off the top rope. Moments later, Aguayo attempted a pinfall even though the rules stated a pinfall did not matter. As the match progressed, sweat began to mix with his blood, causing his face to turn red. As Aguayo tried to climb out of the ring, Konnan leapt up with a low blow to keep his opponent in the cage. At that point, the cameras showed Eddie Guerrero and Madonna's Boyfriend watching the show from backstage, then moments later leaving the backstage area. As Aguayo climbed the cage, Los Gringos came to ringside and threw a cup of liquid in Aguayo's face. He then passed a set of brass knuckles to Konnan to use in the match. While at ringside, Guerrero got into a fistfight with several fans who were upset over his actions, forcing the security guards to step in and stop the fight. Following the assist by Los Gringos Locos, Konnan continued to attack Aguayo, with Aguayo ending up with his face and chest covered in blood from his head wound. At one point, Guerrero attacked the ringside referee, Pepe Casas, preventing him from stepping into the cage to check on Aguayo. When Konnan tried to escape, Los Hermanas Dinamita (Cien Caras, Máscara Año 2000, and Universo 2000) ran to ringside, attacking Guerrero and Madonna's Boyfriend at ringside. As Konnan straddled the cage, Cien Caras climbed up and knocked Konnan off the top and back inside the cage, allowing Aguayo to attack his opponent. Moments later, Aguayo dove off the top rope with a double stomp on Konnan and then climbed out of the cage to victory.

== Aftermath ==
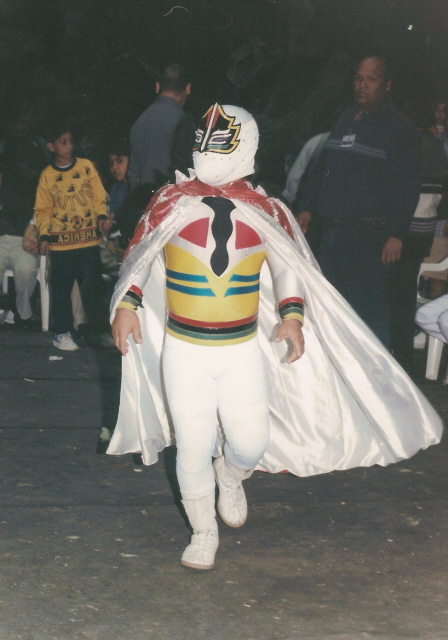
Mascarita Sagrada would work all over the world in the years following When Worlds Collide

Seventeen days after the show, on November 23, Art Barr died in his home in Springfield, Oregon. The official cause of death was never officially confirmed, although it was claimed by some sources to be drug-related. Barr and Guerrero were the reigning AAA World Tag Team Champions at the time of Barr's death and AAA opted to retire the championship instead of vacating the championship and finding new champions. Between 1994 and 2007 AAA's primary championship was the Mexican National Tag Team Championship, until AAA brought back the AAA World Tag Team Championship at the 2007 Rey de Reyes show on March 18, 2007. Following When Worlds Collide, AAA owner Antonio Peña was working on a storyline that would have Barr and Guerrero turn on Konnan, turning Konnan tecnico in the process. The start of the storyline was planted during the show, as Barr was not at ringside to help Konnan during the match. The conclusion of the storyline would come at Triplemanía III at Estadio Azteca, where AAA was hoping to sell out the 130,000 seat arena.

Barr died before AAA had a chance to move on with the storyline after When Worlds Collide. Barr's death was followed shortly afterwards by the Mexican peso crisis, which meant most of the US-based wrestlers were able to earn only a fraction of what they were used to while working for AAA. The peso crisis led to Eddie Guerrero working for the Philadelphia, Pennsylvania-based Extreme Championship Wrestling (ECW) instead. At the time of Barr's death, both wrestlers were in negotiations to work for ECW part-time, which became full-time in 1995. Guerrero would later end up working full-time for World Championship Wrestling, which had produced When Worlds Collide. After Barr's death, AAA retired the AAA World Tag Team Championship in Barr's honor. With Barr dying and Guerrero leaving, Los Gringos Locos was abandoned as well.

A week after When Worlds Collide, Perro Aguayo followed up his steel cage win by winning the IWC World Heavyweight Championship from Konnan in a match that was originally designed to be part of the storyline in which Konnan turned tecnico after Los Gringos were unable to help him retain his title, but that aspect of the storyline was dropped a few weeks later. Konnan turned tecnico in the wake of Barr's death and teamed up again with Perro Aguayo, especially as they fought against Los Capos (brothers Cien Caras and Máscara Año 2000) in what would be the new main storyline in AAA leading to Triplemanía III. Aguayo and Konnan ended up challenging for both the IWC World Heavyweight Championship and the UWA World Heavyweight Championship but lost by disqualification. By 1996 Konnan had also left AAA and would begin to work for WCW on a regular basis. After Triplemanía III, Aguayo began teaming with his son Perro Aguayo Jr. as the latter began his professional wrestling career.

El Hijo del Santo would work for AAA until mid-1995 and then leave the promotion due to disagreements over pay and position on the shows, jumping to rival CMLL in the process. In subsequent years, Hijo del Santo expressed a lot of criticism of AAA, but did work with them for one match in 2009; he then claimed AAA did not pay him what they had agreed on. Hijo del Santo's partner at When Worlds Collide, Octagón, remained with AAA for years, becoming one of their key players and trademark wrestlers, and working opposite several "evil clones" known as Pentagón, an event that spawned a storyline successor, Octagón Jr. Octagón left AAA in 2014.

The fight between Jerry Estrada and La Parka at the end of their When Worlds Collide match led to La Parka turning full-fledged tecnico, quickly becoming a popular fan favorite. Estrada ended up winning the Mexican National Light Heavyweight Championship on March 28, 1995. One hundred and thirty-one days later, La Parka reclaimed the championship as their storyline continued to evolve. In 1996, La Parka was one of many AAA wrestlers who also began working for WCW on a regular basis and eventually left AAA. With the La Parka character being so popular, Peña decided to replace the man under the mask with a New La Parka and forced the original to change his name to "L.A. Park", as AAA owned the trademark for the name.

During the show, English-language commentator Chris Cruise stated, "Rey Misterio jr. at 5 foot 2, 145 lbs, may be the future of Mexican wrestling". Rey Misterio Jr. ended up working for WCW until the company closed in 2001, then later on for the WWE as "Rey Mysterio" where he held the WWE Championship once and the World Heavyweight Championship twice. Psicosis and Juventud Guerrera also ended up working regularly for WCW and had stints with the WWE as well.

With the demise of WCW in 2001, the WWE bought the rights to all WCW footage, which included When Worlds Collide, and has included select matches as part of their DVD releases. The second match of the night was featured on the "Rey Mysterio, the Littlest Big Man" DVD released in 2012. The La Pareja del Terror tag team match was featured on the "Eddie Guerrero, Cheating death, stealing life" DVD released in 2004. When the WWE Network was launched in 2014, When Worlds Collide was one of only a few WCW-produced PPVs not made available on demand. While the event was never shown on the WWE Network, clips of the opening match, the second match, and the main event steel cage match were shown on WWE.com. They also posted the full semi-main event match.

=== Reception ===
John Molinaro of the Canadian Online Explorer described When Worlds Collide as one of the most critically acclaimed shows in wrestling history and stated that the tag team Luchas de Apuestas match was "incredible, a five-star performance and ranks as one of the greatest matches in PPV history". Dave Meltzer, who created the Wrestling Observer Newsletter (WON), also gave the match 5 stars, his highest rating, and the show was cited as a big part of why La Pareja del Terror was the WON Tag Team of the Year, and Art Barr was the Heel of the Year in 1994.

The Pro Wrestling Torch review of the main event steel cage match stated that "Tons of activity outside the cage, in–ring psychology, and intense fan heat made up for a largely mediocre athletic performance by the two men", referring to Konnan and Perro Aguayo. It added that "the wrestling contained on this card impressed those responding to the Torch poll". The Torch rated the opening match at three-and-a-half stars, the second match at four stars, the third match at two and three-quarter stars, the tag match at four and a quarter stars, and the main event at three stars. The tag team match is rated "9.02" out of a possible 10 by the registered users of cagematch.net. When the WWE posted clips from the show on their website, they described the show as "the Best PPV you have never seen".

=== Lawsuit ===
Eastern Championship Wrestling - which had promoted an event titled When Worlds Collide in May 1994 - sued World Championship Wrestling for copyright infringement over the use of "When Worlds Collide". The case was settled out of court. As part of the settlement, WCW agreed to supply three of its contracted wrestlers for an ECW event on November 18, 1994: Kevin Sullivan, Sherri Martel, and Steve Austin (later replaced by Brian Pillman).

== Results ==
No.	Results	Stipulations	Times
1	Mascarita Sagrada and Octagoncito defeated Espectrito and Jerrito Estrada	Tag team match	08:30
2	Fuerza Guerrera, Madonna's Boyfriend, and Psicosis defeated Rey Misterio Jr., Heavy Metal, and Latin Lover	Six-man tag team match	12:46
3	The Pegasus Kid, 2 Cold Scorpio, and Tito Santana defeated Jerry Estrada, La Parka, and Blue Panther	Six-man tag team match	14:58
4	Octagón and El Hijo del Santo defeated La Pareja del Terror (Art Barr and Eddy Guerrero)	Two out of three falls Lucha de Apuestas, Mask vs. Hair match	22:29
5	Perro Aguayo defeated Konnan	Steel cage match	17:50
