= Black Cat (wrestler) =

Mexican professional wrestler (1954–2006)

Personal information
- Born: Víctor Manuel Mar; October 17, 1954 Mexico City, Mexico
- Died: January 28, 2006 (aged 51)
- Cause of death: Heart attack

Professional wrestling career
- Ring name(s): Black Cat; Kuroneko
- Billed height: 1.80 m (5 ft 11 in)
- Billed weight: 100 kg (220 lb)
- Trained by: Huroki Sito
- Debut: April 21, 1977
- Retired: July 8, 2003

Víctor Mar Manuel (October 17, 1954 – January 28, 2006), better known by the ring name Black Cat, was a Mexican professional wrestler who spent the majority of his career in New Japan Pro Wrestling (NJPW). From 1985 until 1991, he worked solely in NJPW; although he did not win a single title in Japan, he became a member of the Greatest Wrestlers class of 2009 following his untimely 2006 death. Outside of Japan, he is known as a founder of Los Gringos Locos, the unit that captivated Eddie Guerrero (then with Art Barr as La Pareja del Terror) into popularity in AAA and later worldwide.

== Early life ==
Mar was born in Mexico City, into a family of luchadores. His father was Macario Mar, who wrestled under the ring name “Huroki Sito”. One of his uncles was Sugi Sito. The Mar family was of Chinese ancestry, though they were portrayed as kayfabe Japanese, a gimmick Sugi Sito developed during the Second World War to play off anti-Japanese sentiment.

== Professional wrestling career ==
=== Universal Wrestling Association (1977–1981) ===
After being trained by his father, Mar made his professional wrestling debut on April 21, 1977, under the ring name Kuroneko (Japanese: 黒猫, lit. 'Black Cat'). In his debut match, on April 21, 1977, he defeated Mr. Bronce at a Universal Wrestling Association event. In UWA, he was a midcarder working for promotion's small buildings including Arena Naucalpan and Arena Neza. In 1979, he won the Naucalpan Tag Team Championship with Villano IV.

=== New Japan Pro-Wrestling (1981–1994) ===
After spending four years with UWA, he changed his ring name to Black Cat (the literal English translation of “Kuroneko”). He debuted in Japanese promotion New Japan Pro-Wrestling on April 21, 1981, as a luchadore opponent for Tiger Mask whom he went on to beat in a puroresu vs. lucha libre match. In 1982, he briefly returned to Mexico but came back to NJPW as a referee. He also wrestled there as an undercarder against ascending stars. During his years wrestling there, he would exchange his stands between Japan and Mexico to help young talent in their training.

He would mainly wrestle against inumerous foreign wrestlers that would tour in Japan (notable opponents such as Adrian Adonis in May 1985, El Canek in April 1986, Kevin Von Erich in June 1987, Dr. Wagner Jr. in June 1988, Black Tiger in June 1989, Cheetah Kid in March 1990, Bobby Eaton in February 1994 and many more to date), and also would defeat young talent such as Kensuke Sasaki, Koji Kanemoto, Michiyoshi Ohara, Takayuki Iizuka, Osamu Matsuda, and would also aid New Japan in rivalries against rival promotions.

In 1990, Black Cat wrestled in NJPW shows staged in Harbin, China and Baghdad, Iraq.

=== Asistencia Asesoría y Administración (1994) ===
In February 1994, Black Cat left NJPW and debuted in Asistencia Asesoría y Administración, a promotion in his hometown Mexico which was his return to Mexico. After his debut in AAA, he joined the stable Los Gringos Locos as the latest member of the stable. The group consisted of La Pareja del Terror (Eddie Guerrero and "Love Machine" Art Barr), Konnan and Madonna's Boyfriend. This group was the most hated stable in the history of lucha libre. While in AAA, he feuded with Mascarita Sagrada. At TripleMania II-A, held on April 26, 1994, he teamed with Guerrero and Barr but lost to El Hijo del Santo, Octagon and Perro Aguayo.

=== New Japan Pro-Wrestling (1994–2003) ===
In September 1994, Black Cat made his return to NJPW, often teaming with the masked Love Machine and Black Tiger. He stayed there and kept wrestling as an undercarder but without returning to AAA, with his most notable work there during the decade being aiding New Japan against UWF-i wrestlers. In 1995, Black Cat travelled to North Korea to wrestle in NJPW's Collision in Korea show.

During his second stint with NJPW he also refereed some matches until 2001, when he was involved in a serious injury against El Samurai. Two years later, in 2003, he retired as a referee and as a professional wrestler.

=== World Championship Wrestling (1998) ===
While in January 1998, he made four appearances with Atlanta, Georgia based World Championship Wrestling. His first WCW appearance was at the January 12, 1998, edition of Nitro where he lost to Marty Jannetty. His second appearance with WCW was on the January 15 Thunder where he teamed with Ohara and Gedo but lost to Steiner Brothers and Ray Traylor in a 6-man tag team match. His third appearance was a loss to Chris Adams on the March 28, 1998 episode of WCW Worldwide. His fourth and final appearance was a loss to Booker T on the April 4, 1998 episode of WCW Worldwide.

== Death ==
Manuel suffered a massive heart attack and died on January 28, 2006.

== Championships and accomplishments ==
- New Japan Pro-Wrestling
  - Greatest Wrestlers (Class of 2009)
- Mexico City Boxing and Wrestling Commission
  - Mexican National Junior Heavyweight Championship (1 time)
- Pro Wrestling Illustrated
  - PWI ranked him #435 of the top 500 singles wrestlers the PWI 500 in 1995
- Tokyo Sports
  - Service Award (2006)
- Universal Wrestling Association
  - Naucalpan Tag Team Championship (1 time) - with Rokambole

== Luchas de Apuestas record ==
Winner (wager)	Loser (wager)	Location	Event	Date	Notes
Kuroneko (mask)	Principe Rebelde (hair)	Cuautitlán, Mexico State	Live event	July 5, 1977	
Máscara Sagrada (mask)	Black Cat (mask)	Zapopan, Jalisco	Triplemania II-B	May 15, 1994	
