= Bullring by the Sea =

Multiple purpose facility in Tijuana, Mexico

Coordinates: 32°32′0″N 117°7′17″W

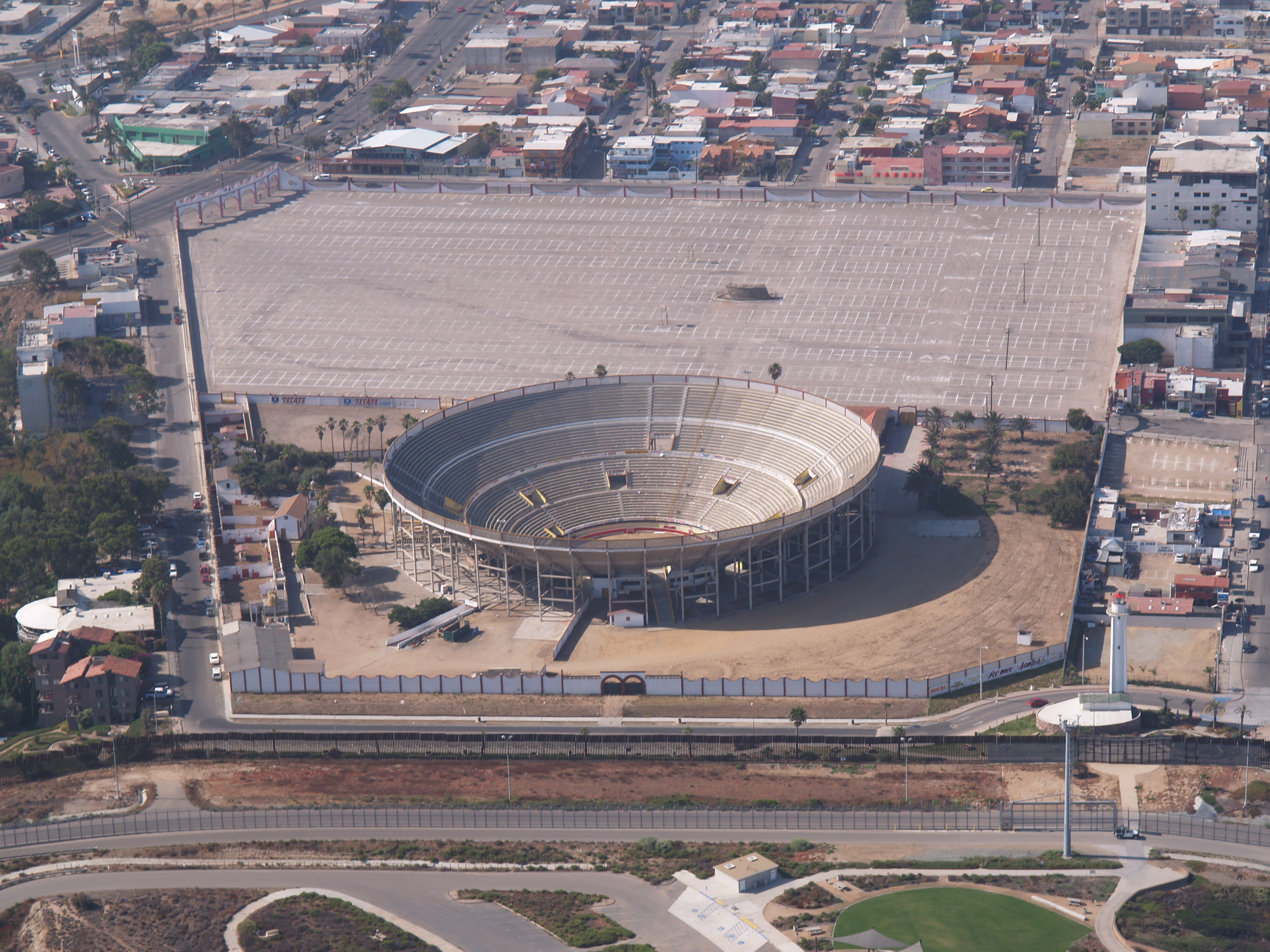
Aerial view of the Plaza Monumental de Tijuana facing south from the United States, 2013

The Plaza Monumental de Tijuana (also called the "Plaza Monumental de Playas de Tijuana" after the neighborhood in which it is located), and popularly known in English as the Bullring by the Sea, is a bullring in Tijuana, Baja California, Mexico. Its opening was held on June 26, 1960. The stadium holds 21,621 people. In addition to bullfighting, the bullring frequently hosts boxing matches, concerts, cultural, and sporting events. It is located just 60 meters from the Mexico–United States border and one block from the Pacific Ocean.

== History ==
The bullring was constructed in only 90 days, resulting from a contract between Salvatore Hurtado, the owner, and Raymundo Muzquiz Ayala. Muzquiz accomplished the construction so quickly by use of pre-fabricated blocks that were made in San Diego and assembled in Tijuana.

Bullfights were broadcast in Los Angeles in Spanish during the 1960s and 1970s. Celebrated American bullfighter Sidney Franklin provided commentary in English in the 1960s and by bullfighting expert Syd Love in the 1970s via FM simulcast.

The Tijuana Pop Festival was held in the Bullring on 13 October 1968. The festival was slated to feature the Animals, Iron Butterfly, Patchwork Security Blanket, the Collectors, the Chicago Transit Authority and the Yellow Pages; however, the Animals and Iron Butterfly never played. Other issues which marred the event included rumors that the festival had been canceled, long pauses between acts, police activity at the border and at the ring and the political impact of the Tlatelolco massacre only eleven days before. Roger B. Stovold of the Teaspoon Door called the event "one of the biggest fiascos in pop festival history" and concluded that it "left enough of a black mark that any future pop festival in Mexico is unlikely."
