= Los Gringos Locos =

Professional wrestling stable

Stable
- Members: Eddie Guerrero; Art Barr; Konnan; Black Cat; Madonna's Boyfriend; Chicano Power; El Misterioso; King Lion
- Name(s): La Pareja del Terror; Los Gringos Locos
- Billed from: The United States of America
- Debut: 1992
- Disbanded: November 23, 1994
- Years active: 1992–1994

Los Gringos Locos (intended to mean The Crazy Americans in English) were a lucha libre stable in Asistencia Asesoría y Administración (AAA). The stable was originally a tag team consisting of Eddie Guerrero and Art Barr and existed between 1992 and 1994.

Almost three decades later, a new iteration of Los Gringos Locos was formed as a tag team consisting of Dominik Mysterio and El Grande Americano.

== Gimmick ==
Los Gringos Locos was intended to be the Mexican version of the Four Horsemen alliance in American promotion World Championship Wrestling. Because Barr was American and Guerrero was Mexican-American, they were able to draw heat from Mexican crowds as they acted more and more American. The team wore red, white, and blue wrestling attire.

== History ==
=== La Pareja del Terror ===
The stable began as the tag team La Pareja del Terror (The Pair of Terror) made up of Eddy Guerrero and the "Love Machine" Art Barr.

At first the two men did not get along behind the scenes, but they decided to team up for business reasons. Guerrero, however, was teaming with El Hijo del Santo at the time. Guerrero's brother Mando came up with the idea of Guerrero turning on Santo and aligning himself with Barr as villains. Barr and Guerrero met with AAA's owner Antonio Peña, who gave them the green light on the storyline. The duo was originally known as the American Machine and then La Pareja del Terror, but their name was changed to Los Gringos Locos after the announcers said "Those gringos are loco," in regards to the team. Los Gringos feuded primarily with El Hijo del Santo and Octagón. On November 5, 1993, Santo and Octagón defeated them to become the inaugural IWC/AAA World Tag Team Champions. Barr and Guerrero, however, defeated them for the championship in July. Meanwhile, as they continued to team together, Guerrero and Barr began to become good friends.

=== Becoming a stable ===
As Los Gringos Locos became more popular in Mexico, AAA's owner Antonio Peña and top star Konnan decided to turn the team into an alliance of several wrestlers. Backstage, both Guerrero and Barr were against the idea of expanding the team, but agreed to it if they could have a say in who was allowed to join the stable. Konnan was the first to join the team, and at the suggestion of Guerrero and Barr, Black Cat was the second. The stable continued to grow to include Madonna's Boyfriend (Louie Spicolli), Chicano Power, El Misterioso and King Lion.

The team continued to feud with El Hijo del Santo and Octagón, but the rivalry ended in a Hair vs. Mask match at the first lucha pay-per-view in America, When Worlds Collide, which they lost. Barr convinced Antonio Peña that he be included in the match, which was originally supposed to be Guerrero against Santo. Barr and Guerrero both received $7,500 for their part in the match.

In the United States, Paul Heyman, the promoter of Extreme Championship Wrestling (ECW), began negotiating with Barr and Guerrero in hopes of bringing the team into his promotion. At the time, rumors circulated that Heyman planned to have Barr and Guerrero feud with The Public Enemy. The duo were looking to work outside of Mexico as the Peso had been devalued, which had caused a dramatic decrease in their pay. On November 23, 1994, Art Barr died from a drug-related heart attack. After his death, the team was forced to vacate the IWC/AAA World Tag Team Championship. The group eventually disbanded not long after. Guerrero took a brief hiatus from wrestling through the rest of 1994 until April 1995 where he appeared in ECW as a singles wrestler, defeating 2 Cold Scorpio to win the ECW TV Title in his debut match for the promotion. Guerrero also started using the Frog Splash in tribute to Art Barr. Guerrero would then go on and have worldwide success in WCW and WWE until his death in 2005.

In addition to Barr's death in 1994 and Guerrero's death in 2005, Louie Spicolli (1971-1998), King Lion (1968-2002), Black Cat (1954-2006) and Chicano Power (died 2018) have also passed away, leaving Konnan and El Misterioso as the only surviving members of Los Gringos Locos.

=== Los Gringos Locos 2.0 ===
Los Gringos Locos 2.0

Tag team
- Members: Dominik Mysterio; El Grande Americano
- Name: Los Gringos Locos 2.0
- Billed from: The United States of America
- Debut: May 22, 2025
- Disbanded: July 25, 2026
- Years active: 2025, 2026

In April 2025, American wrestling promotion WWE had acquired AAA. After 31 years of the original stable's dissolution, a new iteration of Los Gringos Locos was formed when El Grande Americano (a character originally portrayed by Chad Gable) helped Dominik Mysterio retain the Intercontinental Championship against Pénta at Backlash on May 10.

Following Gable's injury, the El Grande Americano character would then be portrayed by Ludwig Kaiser. After months of helping Mysterio along with the formation of Los Americanos (a stable consisting of Kaiser and New Catch Republic's Pete Dunne and Tyler Bate), at the November 22 Alianzas event, Mysterio and Americano's tag team name is confirmed as Los Gringos Locos 2.0 and both men were to challenge the Lucha Brothers (Pénta and Rey Fénix) in a tag team match on December 20 at Guerra de Titanes show, until Penta injured his shoulder on the November 24, 2025 episode of Raw. On December 16, Penta named Rey Mysterio as his replacement, and both Fénix and Mysterio would defeat Los Gringos Locos 2.0 at the main event of Guerra de Titanes on December 20. Mysterio dumped Americano after the match.

Kaiser rescued Mysterio from El Hijo del Vikingo and Omos on the February 21 episode of AAA, only to be attacked by the "original" El Grande Americano Chad Gable and being abandoned by Mysterio again. Kaiser became the number 1 contender for Mysterio's AAA Mega Championship by winning the Rey de Reyes tournament and became the sole claimant to the mantle of "El Grande Americano" after defeating Gable at Noche de Los Grandes. Notwithstanding this, on the July 11 episode of AAA, the duo seemingly reconciled after Americano was attacked by the revived Los Perros del Mal stable and rescued by Mysterio, with Mysterio challenging Los Perros del Mal to a tag team match at Verano de Escándalo. Mysterio would again abandon Americano, leading to Los Perros del Mal winning the match, and later joined El Ojo, aligning himself with Omos and Dorian Roldán.

== Members ==
*	Founding member(s)

=== AAA ===
Members	Joined	Left
Eddie Guerrero	July 23, 1993 *	November 23, 1994
Art Barr	July 23, 1993 *	November 23, 1994
Konnan	1993	November 23, 1994
Black Cat	1993	November 23, 1994
Madonna's Boyfriend	1993	November 23, 1994
Chicano Power	1993	November 23, 1994
El Misterioso	1993	November 23, 1994
King Lion	1993	November 23, 1994

== Championships and accomplishments ==
- Asistencia Asesoría y Administración
  - AAA World Tag Team Championship (1 time) - Guerrero and Barr
- Pro Wrestling Illustrated
  - PWI ranked Guerrero and Barr #18 of the 100 best tag teams of the "PWI Years" in 2003
- Wrestling Observer Newsletter
  - Feud of the Year (1994) Los Gringos Locos vs. AAA
  - Tag Team of the Year (1994) Guerrero and Barr
