= Super Parka =

Mexican professional wrestler (born 1956)

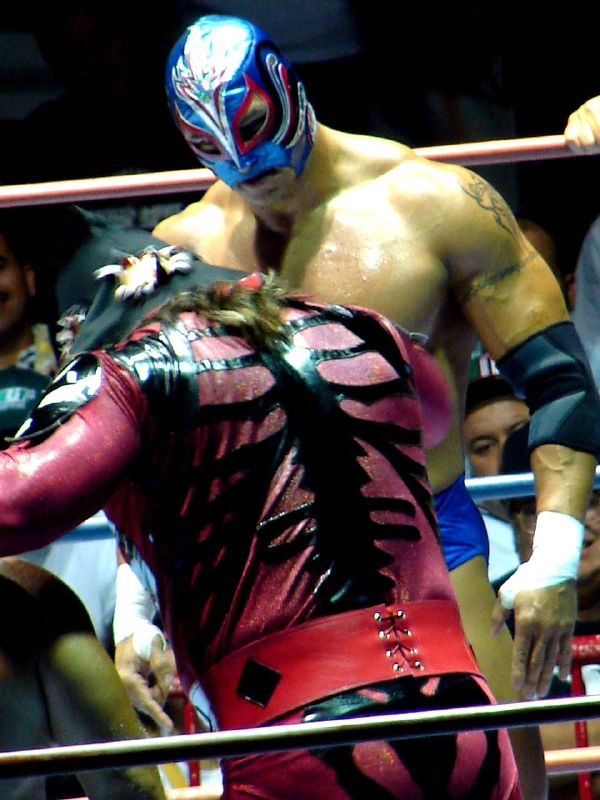
- Super Parka (back turned towards the camera) against Olímpico

Personal information
- Born: Ramón Ibarra Banda; May 24, 1956 (age 70) San Buenaventura, Coahuila, Mexico
- Children: Volador Jr. (son)
- Relatives: Johnny Ibarra (brother); Flyer (grandson); L.A. Park (nephew); El Hijo de Cien Caras (nephew); El Hijo de L.A. Park (great-nephew); L.A. Park Jr. (great-nephew)

Professional wrestling career
- Ring name(s): Rayo Norteno; Remo Banda; Super Parka; Volador
- Billed height: 1.78 m (5 ft 10 in)
- Billed weight: 91 kg (201 lb)
- Billed from: Monclova, Coahuila, Mexico
- Trained by: Alberto Mora; Herodes; Mr. Lince; Centurión Negro
- Debut: May 24, 1976

Ramón Ibarra Banda (born May 24, 1956) is a Mexican professional wrestler, working under the ring name Super Parka. Ibarra previously worked as Volador from 1990 until 1997 and as Super Parka ever since. Ibarra is the father of professional wrestler Volador Jr., the grandfather of Flyer and the uncle of L.A. Park (the original La Parka), who was the inspiration for the "Super Parka" character. Throughout his career he has worked for most of the major Mexican wrestling promotions including Consejo Mundial de Lucha Libre (CMLL), Lucha Libre AAA Worldwide (AAA), International Wrestling Revolution Group (IWRG) and the World Wrestling Association (WWA) but works primarily on the Mexican and US independent circuit. While he has been unmasked in Mexico, Ibarra still wears the "Super Parka" mask when wrestling in the United States.

== Professional wrestling career ==
=== Remo Banda (1976–1990) ===
Ibarra made his professional wrestling debut in 1976 under the ring name "Remo Banda", wrestling without a mask. Early in his career he also worked as the enmascarado "Rayo Norteño" ("Northern Lightning") but lost the mask in a Lucha de Apuesta, or bet match against El Pantera (not the current Pantera) on July 18, 1976. From then on he wrestled as Remo Banda.

=== Volador (1990–1997) ===
In late 1990 EMLL decided that it was time for Ramón Ibarra to work as an masked wrestler again as they wanted to freshen his character up after having worked as "Remo Banda" for 14 years. Initially EMLL offered Ibarra the ring character and mask of Oro, but Ibarra turned the offer down since the mask had limited visibility due to the mesh over the eyes. EMLL found a young wrestler to play Oro while they created another mask and ring character for Ibarra called "Volador", the Spanish term for "Flying", inspired by the Voladores of Mexico. Volador was teamed up with Ángel Azteca and together the team captured the Mexican National Tag Team Championship on March 9, 1991, when they defeated the team of Pierroth Jr. and Bestia Salvaje. The team held the championship for just 81 days before losing it to Los Destructores (Tony Arce and Vulcano) on May 29, 1991. Following the team loss Volador and Ángel Azteca broke up amicably, with each wrestler focusing on their own career from then on. In early 1992 Volador began teaming with a very talented young wrestler called Misterioso and together they won the Mexican National Tag Team title from Los Destructores on March 8, 1992. In mid-1992 EMLL booker Antonio Peña decided to break away from EMLL and form his own promotion Asistencia Asesoría y Administración (AAA; now known as Lucha Libre AAA Worldwide) and took a number of EMLL wrestlers with him, included in the exodus were Volador and Misterioso who took the Mexican National Tag Team Championship with them to AAA (Note: This was possible because EMLL technically did not own the championship, the Mexico City Wrestling and Boxing commission owned them and allowed EMLL to book the titles. the Commission gave AAA the rights to the championship in 1992.) The team held the belts until August 28, 1992, where they lost them to Los Destructores as part of a rivalry that had carried over from EMLL to AAA. Volador and Misterioso regained the championship, but ultimately lost the title on February 12, 1993. Following the title loss the team started a storyline that saw the two turn on each other, with Misterioso becoming a Rudo (bad guy) as he attacked Volador. The storyline between the two played out over a long period of time, culminating in a Lucha de Apuesta match on July 15, 1995, where both men put their masks on the line. The event drew a crowd of 16,000 people to El Torero de Tijuana for a very profitable show. During the match Misterioso's cornerman Blue Panther attempted to injure Volador (in storyline terms) with a Martinete (piledriver). Misterioso came to the aid of his former friend, saving him from Blue Panther but ended up knocked out by a chair shot to the head. Out of respect for his former partner and in appreciation of what he had just done Volador dragged the unconscious Misterioso on top of himself and allowed the referee to count to three. Following the match Misteriosos pleaded with Volador not to remove the mask but Volador was a man of his word and unmasked.

=== Super Parka (1997–present) ===
In March 1997 Ramón Ibarra donned a new ring persona and mask, that of Super Parka, a character inspired by his nephew Adolfo Tapia's very successful "La Parka" character. Going so far as to copying the mask and outfit except with an orange skeleton instead of a white and a large Superman "S" on the chest. Initially Ibarra wrestled as unmasked as Volador in AAA and masked as Super Parka on the independent circuit. When Volador lost a Lucha de Apuesta match to Pimpinela Escarlata and had his hair shaved off he was suspended by the Mexico City Boxing and Wrestling Commission for breaking the rules set for masked wrestlers. The suspension was not lifted until Ibarra stopped wrestling as Volador and worked as Super Parka full-time. While he had worked for AAA as Volador, Super Parka did not work for AAA mainly because they themselves had created a "La Parka clone" in La Parka, Jr. to take the original's place (La Parka was wrestling full-time in the US). In 1999 Super Parka worked for International Wrestling Revolution Group (IWRG) in Naucalpan, Mexico State where he defeated Pirata Morgan to win the IWRG Intercontinental Heavyweight Championship. He held the title for 23 days, the shortes reign for any IWRG Intercontinental Heavyweight Champion, before losing the belt to Scorpio, Jr.

In September 1999 he introduced his son to the professional wrestling world as he helped Volador Jr. make his debut. In 2000 Super Parka, along with Super Caló, Halloween, and Damián 666 toured Japan, wrestling for All Japan Pro Wrestling (AJPW) in August and September 2000. Super Parka would later return to AJPW, teaming with La Parka. In Mexico Super Parka began to work for the Tijuana based World Wrestling Association around the turn of the millennia. On March 31, 2000, he defeated Halloween to win the WWA World Junior Light Heavyweight Championship. The reign WWA Junior Light Heavyweight Champion lasted until April 30, 2002, where he lost to Super Kendo. Super Parka regained the title only a few months later and held it until June 2004, over 700 days, until he lost the title to Super Kendo.

On October 9, 2003, Super Parka was unmasked as he lost a Lucha de Apuesta match to El Hijo del Santo in the main event of a very successful WWA show in Tijuana. In 2005 Super Parka had his hair shaved off when he lost to his nephew L.A. Park (forced to change his name for legal reasons) when they were the last two wrestlers left in a cage match that also included Dr. Wagner, Jr. and Perro Aguayo, Jr. In 2007 Super Parka made several appearances for Consejo Mundial de Lucha Libre (CMLL; previously known as EMLL) as a freelance wrestler, paying off the fact that L.A. Park was one of CMLL's headline wrestlers at the time. In CMLL he lost two Lucha de Apuesta matches in quick succession being shaved bald by Héctor Garza and Último Guerrero. Super Parka has subsequently stopped working for CMLL, working select dates for various Mexican or US wrestling promotions. When he wrestles in the United States he wears the Super Parka mask, something that is not allowed in Mexico, while in Mexico he wears the mask to the ring, but removes it before the match to comply with the rules of Lucha Libre.

On September 11, 2015, Ibarra returned to CMLL after an almost eight-year absence. He was originally set to team with his son Volador Jr. and his nephew L.A. Park, but Park was fired in the week leading up to the show for using profanity during a CMLL show. Instead of the Ibarra family trio Super Parka teamed up with his son and Valiente for his CMLL return. A couple of months later Super Parka began working a storyline feud against Negro Casas, one of CMLL's resident veteran rudos. The story line eventually led to the two captaining a team of three, facing off during the 2015 Infierno en el Ring. Super Parka teamed with Máximo Sexy and Valiente while Casas teamed up with Kamaitachi and Bárbaro Cavernario. After Super Parka's team won the match both Super Parka and Casas laid out a Lucha de Apuestas challenge, daring each other to put their hair on the line for a special "bet match" between the two. Moments later CMLL officials came to the ring to sign the contract for the following week's Sin Piedad ("No Mercy") show. Casas defeated Super Parka, forcing Super Parka to have all his hair shaved off as a result. Casas' nephew Puma helped his uncle win the match, much to the displeasure of Volador Jr. who was in his father's corner. Volador Jr. vowed to get revenge for what he described as the Casas family's cheating ways.

== Personal life ==
Ramón Ibarra is a part of an extended family of wrestlers, including his son who wrestles as Volador Jr. and his grandson who works as Flyer. His brothers also wrestle, they're known under the ring names Johnny Ibarra and El Desalmado. His nephews are lucha libre legend L.A. Park and wrestler El Hijo de Cien Caras. He's also the great-uncle of L.A. Park's son who wrestles as El Hijo de L.A. Park.

== Championships and accomplishments ==
- Lucha Libre AAA Worldwide
  - Mexican National Tag Team Championship (2 times) – with Misterioso (Note: During their reign as Tag Team champions Volador and Misterioso left CMLL to join AAA, taking the championship with them, Ibarra is a three time Tag Team champions.)
- Consejo Mundial de Lucha Libre
  - Mexican National Tag Team Championship (1 time) – with Ángel Azteca
- International Wrestling Revolution Group
  - IWRG Intercontinental Heavyweight Championship (1 time)
- World Wrestling Association
  - WWA World Junior Light Heavyweight Championship (2 times)

== Luchas de Apuestas record ==
Winner (wager)	Loser (wager)	Location	Event	Date	Notes
Pantera (mask)	Rayo Norteno (mask)	Monterrey, Nuevo León	Live event	July 18, 1976	
Remo Banda (hair)	Comando Ruso (hair)	Mexico City	Live event	February 16, 1990	
Remo Banda (hair)	César Curiel (hair)	Mexico City	Live event	April 1, 1990	
Remo Banda (hair)	Gran Cochisse (hair)	Mexico City	Live event	May 5, 1990	
Javier Llanes (hair)	Remo Banda (hair)	Mexico City	Live event	August 5, 1990	
Misterioso (mask)	Volador (mask)	Tijuana, Baja California	Live event	July 14, 1995	
Pimpinela Escarlata (hair)	Volador (hair)	Nuevo Laredo, Tamaulipas	Live event	July 28, 1997	(Note: Since Ibarra had already begun wrestling as the masked Super Parka in other places the Mexico City wrestling commission suspended him from wrestling in Mexico City.)
Super Parka (mask)	Pantera Asesina (mask)	Durango	Live event	November, 1998	
Super Parka (mask)	Black Higor (mask)	N/A	Live event	N/A	
Super Parka (mask)	Zapatista (hair)	N/A	Live event	N/A	
Super Parka (mask)	Gacela del Ring (hair)	N/A	Live event	N/A	
Super Parka (mask)	Black Eagle (mask)	Monterrey, Nuevo León	Live event	August 29, 1999	
Halloween (hair)	Super Parka (hair)	Tijuana, Baja California	Live event	October 15, 1999	(Note: Lucha del reves match (hair vs. hair between two masked wrestlers))
Super Parka (mask)	Halloween (mask)	Tijuana, Baja California	Live event	December 24, 1999	
Salsero (hair)	Super Parka (hair)	Tijuana, Baja California	Live event	July 5, 2002	(Note: Super Parka put his hair on the line even though he was masked)
Super Parka (mask)	Super Kendo (mask)	Tijuana, Baja California	Live event	July 26, 2002	
El Hijo del Santo (mask)	Super Parka (mask)	Tijuana, Baja California	Live event	October 9, 2003	
Super Parka (hair)	El Texano (hair)	Tijuana, Baja California	Live event	March 25, 2005	(Note: Multi-man steel cage match that also included Antifaz, Rey Misterio, Satánico, Villano III and El Solar)
L.A. Park (mask)	Super Parka (hair)	Tijuana, Baja California	Live event	May 27, 2005	(Note: Steel cage match that also included Dr. Wagner, Jr. and Perro Aguayo, Jr.)
Super Parka (hair)	Imagen I (hair)	Reynosa, Tamaulipas	Live event	October 15, 2006	
Héctor Garza (hair)	Super Parka (hair)	Monterrey, Nuevo León	Live event	March 18, 2007	
Último Guerrero (mask)	Super Parka (hair)	Monterrey, Nuevo León	Live event|	March 18, 2007	(Note: Ruleta de La Muerte match that also included Dr. Wagner Jr, Místico, Averno, Damián 666, Atlantis and Héctor Garza.)
Rayo de Jalisco Jr. (mask)	Super Parka (hair)	Tijuana, Baja California	Live event	December 6, 2013	
Negro Casas (hair)	Super Parka (hair)	Mexico City	Sin Piedad	January 1, 2016	
