= Art Barr =

American professional wrestler

- Barr as "Beetlejuice" (or The Juicer) in World Championship Wrestling during 1990.

Personal information
- Born: Arthur Leon Barr; October 8, 1966 Portland, Oregon, U.S.
- Died: November 23, 1994 (aged 28) Springfield, Oregon, U.S.
- Cause of death: Heart attack caused by a drug overdose
- Spouse: Veronica Barr (m. 1984)
- Family: Sandy Barr (father); Ferrin Barr, Jr. (brother)

Professional wrestling career
- Ring name(s): Art Barr; Beetlejuice; The Intruder; Love Machine "Love Machine" Art Barr; The Juicer; The Witcher
- Billed height: 6 ft 1 in (1.85 m)
- Billed weight: 240 lb (110 kg)
- Trained by: Sandy Barr; Roddy Piper
- Debut: April 2, 1987

Arthur Leon Barr (October 8, 1966 – November 23, 1994) was an American professional wrestler. While he wrestled briefly for World Championship Wrestling, he found his greatest success in Mexico's Asistencia Asesoría y Administración promotion.

== Early life ==
While growing up, Barr became friends with Roddy Piper during Piper's stint in the Oregonian Pacific Northwest Wrestling. While attending Oregon State University, Barr became an accomplished amateur wrestler, having become a four-time district champion and a two-time state champion. However, he later dropped out of college to tend to his wife when she became pregnant.

Barr had three brothers: Jesse, who was also a wrestler, JR, and Sean. His father, Sandy, was also involved in wrestling as a wrestler, referee and promoter. Sandy died on June 2, 2007.

== Professional wrestling career ==
=== Pacific Northwest Wrestling (1987–1990) ===
After leaving college, Barr began working in a steel mill during the day while he began receiving training to become a wrestler from his father Sandy, his older brother Jesse Barr, and Matt Osborne at night. On April 2, 1987, Barr debuted in the Pacific Northwest Wrestling territory. About a year and a half later, at the suggestion of Roddy Piper, he began wrestling as "Beetlejuice", based on the title character of the 1988 movie. The character, wearing face paint and flour in his hair, was a cartoonish fan favorite.

=== World Championship Wrestling (1990) ===
On July 16, 1989, Barr pled guilty to the rape of a 19-year-old woman after a PNW card in Pendleton, Oregon. After the plea, Barr's license to wrestle in Oregon was not renewed, due to a previous conviction for possession of cocaine that he did not disclose on his license application. About this time, a tape of Barr as Beetlejuice was sent to the offices of WCW president Jim Herd. WCW was even with WWF in adult demographics, but was losing badly among the child demographics. Herd decided to hire Barr, even though booker Ole Anderson thought Barr was too small to work in the company. Barr joined World Championship Wrestling in 1990 and was renamed "The Juicer" in order to avoid copyright conflicts, but he retained his character. Due to a faxing campaign, his sexual assault conviction followed him, which along with his small stature in a wrestling world then dominated by large wrestlers, he lost support and was soon released.

After his release, Barr worked a few spot shows for the Pacific Northwest Wrestling promotion in Washington state, as he was banned from working Oregon by the state's commission.

=== Empresa Mexicana de la Lucha Libre (1991–1992) ===
After leaving WCW, Barr was brought into Mexico's Empresa Mexicana de la Lucha Libre promotion by Konnan. He initially wrestled under a mask as "The American Love Machine", and was very successful. A year after entering EMLL, the American Love Machine faced off against another masked wrestler, Blue Panther, in a mask versus mask match. 18,000 fans sold out the 17,000 seat Arena México in Mexico City and another 8,000 fans watched on big screen TV in the parking lot to see the card. The match ended when American Love Machine performed a piledriver (Martinete in Spanish) against Blue Panther, an illegal move in Mexican wrestling, thus losing his mask.

=== Asistencia Asesoría y Administración (1992–1994) ===
Soon afterward, Barr left EMLL to join Konnan's newly formed Asistencia Asesoría y Administración promotion. As "The Love Machine" Art Barr, he debuted in AAA as a villain, and formed the tag team "La Pareja del Terror" (The Pair of Terror) with Eddie Guerrero. The pair were highly successful, as they would go on to win the World Tag Team Championship and become arguably the most hated tag team in lucha libre history. Barr and Guerrero expanded their tag team into a faction after being joined by Konnan, Black Cat, Jasha, Madonna's Boyfriend, Jake Roberts, Misterioso, Chicano Power and King Lion. Together, the faction became known as Los Gringos Locos (The Crazy Americans).

Despite both the acclaim and the financial success he received, Barr's time in Mexico took a toll on him, as he was reportedly homesick (his wife and son remained in Oregon while he was working in Mexico). Eventually, he turned to alcohol and drugs for solace, despite the concern of his friends in the business.

On November 6, 1994, AAA held the When Worlds Collide pay-per-view card (with some help from WCW) at the Los Angeles Memorial Sports Arena. La Pareja del Terror faced off against El Hijo del Santo and Octagón in a double hair versus mask match. Around this time, Barr and Guerrero were also in talks with Extreme Championship Wrestling. Barr confirmed this in a shoot interview with Los Angeles media following the PPV, and said that he looked forward to competing in ECW, "they're not the biggest promotion but they're the hottest and a very forward thinking promotion". Barr additionally was scheduled to compete at New Japan's annual Tokyo Dome show on January 4, 1995, in a match with Jushin Thunder Liger however this never materialized due to Liger's ankle injury.

At the same time, the World Wrestling Federation, World Championship Wrestling also showed interest in the tag team of Guerrero and Barr however it never got past that stage.

At Triplemania XXIV, Barr was posthumously inducted into the AAA Hall of Fame as the 2016 inductee. He is regarded as the most hated rudo the company has ever had along with his tag team partner Eddie Guerrero as Los Gringos Locos.

=== New Japan Pro Wrestling (1994) ===
Barr made his New Japan Pro-Wrestling debut as "American Machine" in Summer 1994, wrestling under an old American Love Machine mask. He made his debut by teaming with Black Cat and Black Tiger II in a winning effort against the team of Shinjiro Otani, El Samurai and Jushin Liger. Liger apparently had big plans to feud with Barr, but they never materialized after Liger broke his ankle. A match was planned for January 4, 1995 at the Tokyo Dome for the IWGP Junior Heavyweight Championship, challenging champion Norio Honaga, but again this never materialised due to Barr's death in November 1994.

== Death ==
On November 23, 1994, Barr was found dead lying with his child at his home in Springfield, Oregon. Preliminary reports said that he died of heart failure; later reports said that he died under unknown circumstances. Barr did not have heart problems, no aneurysm or internal bleeding, and no ring injuries. He had a mixture of alcohol and drugs in his blood stream. Although Eddie Guerrero's book claims that the cause of Barr's death is still unknown to this day, Hardcore History by Scott E. Williams, criminal-justice reporter and wrestling columnist for The Galveston County Daily News, states that "Barr died in his sleep from a drug-related heart attack."

Another possibility in his death was a freak chairshot that occurred the day before on November 22. During a AAA house show in Tijuana, Mexico, a fan threw a chair at Barr while he was walking back to the locker room, hitting him in the right side of his head, behind his ear. The velocity of the chairshot dislodged the vertebrae in his neck. He flew from Tijuana to Portland after the show and didn't sleep until that night, dying 20 minutes after falling asleep, as his nervous system told his brain to shut down his lungs.

After his death, Guerrero adopted Barr's trademark frog splash as his finishing maneuver in tribute to him. According to Guerrero, when they began tagging he first used the frog splash as the Jackknife Splash. Barr took a liking to the move, began using it regularly and adopted it as his finisher. 2 Cold Scorpio commented to Barr that he "looked like a frog", thus leading Barr to name his move the frog splash. It has since become a trademark move of several wrestlers in Mexico, Japan, and the United States.

== Legacy ==
Dave Meltzer of the Wrestling Observer Newsletter wrote that Barr and his tag team partner Eddie Guerrero changed Lucha Libre forever. "Art Barr and Eddie Guerrero broadened the style of Lucha Libre, Art opened their eyes to his style and made the young guys like Rey Mysterio Jr, Psicosis and Juventud Guerrera who came up from AAA to WCW into the best workers in the world. He and Eddie had that much influence. Art taught them a whole lot."

Chris Jericho said of Barr in his book, A Lion's Tale: Around the World in Spandex, "I think if Art Barr was still alive today he would be one of the top guys in the business, He had such good personality and the ability to piss people off. He drew such big houses for AAA it was scary how good he could have been."

Eddie Guerrero himself also paid tribute Barr on his Cheating Death, Stealing Life DVD produced by WWE: "I learned so much from Art," admitted Guerrero. "He could make the fans laugh, he could make them cry and he could make them pissed off. He made me realize there's more to wrestling than just wrestling. He helped me change my personality in the ring. He had a big effect on me... I cried three months straight when he passed away. He changed everything."

Konnan said that Barr was one of the greatest talents he'd ever stepped into the ring with.

== Personal life ==
On July 16, 1989, Barr pled guilty to the rape of a 19-year-old woman after a PNW card in Pendelton, Oregon; the woman later filed charges. Barr continued to wrestle as Beetlejuice, despite the charges and the attention brought to him and PNW by the Portland Oregonian. A year later, Barr was polygraphed as part of the police investigation, during which he admitted the woman did not consent. Barr believed she would have been willing to have sex someplace else. Barr worked a plea-bargain, and was convicted of first-degree sexual abuse. He was fined $1,000, placed on two years probation, and sentenced to 180 hours of community service, but served no jail time. Barr always maintained that he would have beaten the case in court, but was advised to take the plea since it involved no jail time. Also if he lost, the bad publicity would harm the local wrestling business, driving away customers.

== Championships and accomplishments ==
- Asistencia Asesoría y Administración
  - AAA World Tag Team Championship (1 time) – with Eddie Guerrero
  - AAA Hall of Fame (Class of 2016)
- Championship Wrestling USA
  - CWUSA Tag Team Championship (1 time) – with Konnan el Barbaro
- Pacific Northwest Wrestling
  - NWA Pacific Northwest Tag Team Championship (3 times) – with Big Juice (2 times) and Jesse Barr (1 time)
  - NWA Pacific Northwest Television Championship (1 time)
- Pro Wrestling Illustrated
  - PWI ranked him #62 of the top 500 singles wrestlers in the PWI 500 in 1994
  - PWI ranked him #18 of the 100 best tag teams during the PWI Years with Eddie Guerrero in 2003
  - PWI ranked him #114 of the top 500 singles wrestlers of the PWI Years in 2003
- Wrestling Observer Newsletter
  - Best Heel (1994)
  - Feud of the Year (1994) Los Gringos Locos vs. AAA
  - Tag Team of the Year (1994) with Eddie Guerrero

=== Luchas de Apuestas record ===
Winner (wager)	Loser (wager)	Location	Event	Date	Notes
Blue Panther (mask)	Love Machine (mask)	Mexico City	36. Aniversario de Arena México	April 3, 1992	
El Hijo del Santo and Octagón (masks)	Los Gringos Locos (hair) (Eddy Guerrero and Art Barr)	Los Angeles, California	AAA When Worlds Collide	November 6, 1994	

== See also ==
- List of premature professional wrestling deaths
