= Rise of the Renegades (2019) =

MLW professional wrestling event

- Promotion: Major League Wrestling
- Date: April 4, 2019
- City: Queens, New York City, New York
- Venue: Melrose Ballroom
- Attendance: 1,000

Event chronology
← Previous; Intimidation Games	Next → Battle Riot II

Rise of the Renegades chronology
← Previous; 2003	Next → 2022

Rise of the Renegades (2019) was a professional wrestling supercard event produced by Major League Wrestling (MLW), which took place on April 4, 2019, at the Melrose Ballroom in Queens, New York City, New York. The event was a television taping for MLW Fusion, with Battle Riot II airing as a live Fusion special the following day. It was the second event under the Rise of the Renegades chronology and the first to be held since 2003.

Fifteen matches were taped at the event. In the main event, L. A. Park defeated Pentagon Jr. Other prominent matches on the card included a Street Fight, in which Tom Lawlor successfully defended the World Heavyweight Championship against Jimmy Havoc and a Tables match between The Dynasty (Alexander Hammerstone, Maxwell Jacob Friedman and Richard Holliday) and The Hart Foundation (Brian Pillman Jr., Davey Boy Smith Jr. and Teddy Hart).

== Production ==
=== Background ===
In July 2017, Major League Wrestling resumed promoting events for the first time since the promotion's original closure in 2004. The success of these events lead MLW to secure a television deal with beIN Sports for a new program, MLW Fusion, which debuted on April 20, 2018.

On August 27, 2018, MLW owner Court Bauer announced that MLW would be hosting an event at the Melrose Ballroom in Queens, New York City, New York, which would also be a television taping for Fusion on April 4, 2019. On October 5, MLW.com announced that a second card had been added to the April 4 television taping for April 5, which would be Battle Riot II. On January 15, it was announced that the April 4 event would be titled "Rise of the Renegades", marking the return of the event since 2003 and also being the second event in the chronology.

=== Storylines ===
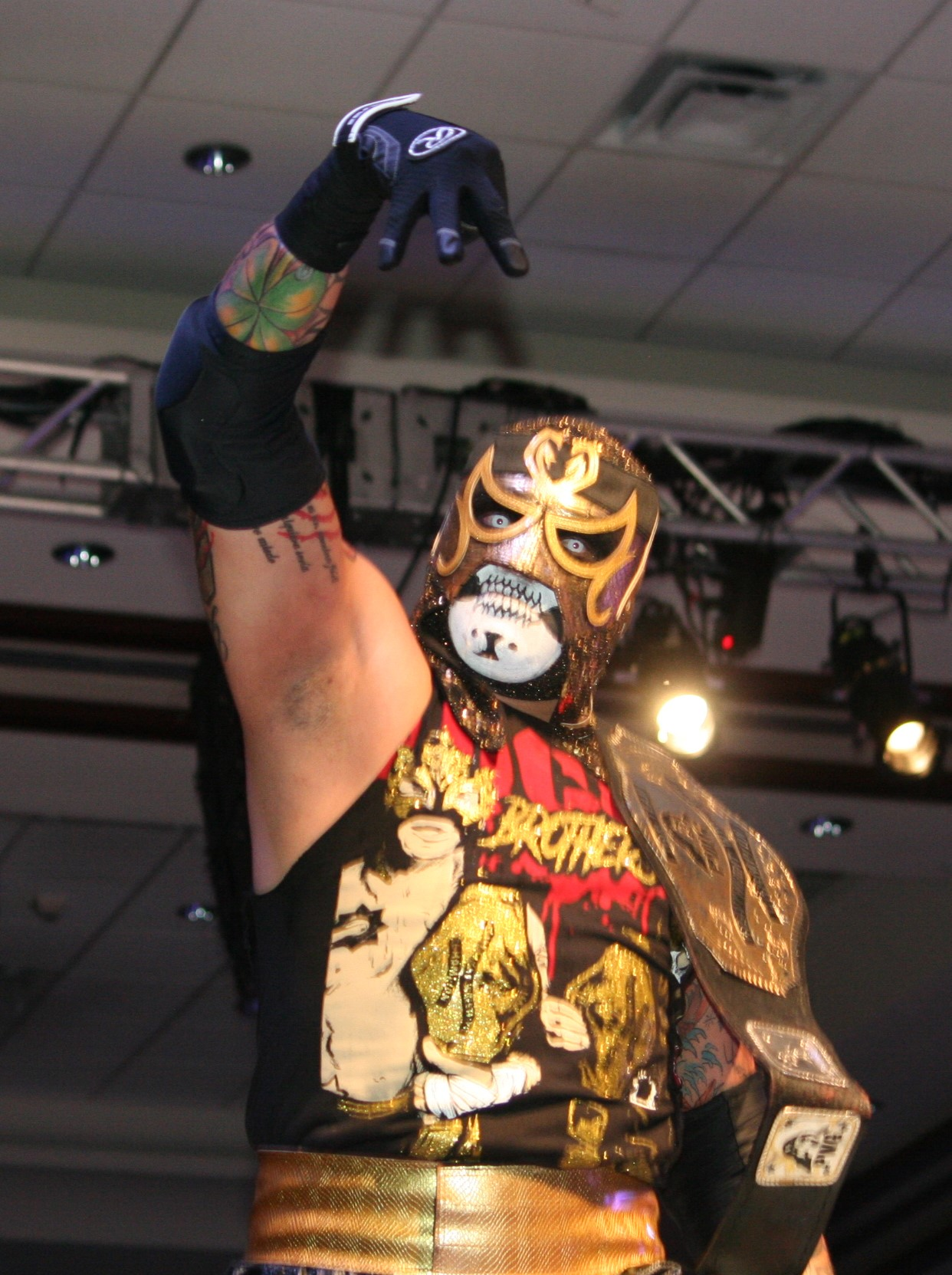
Pentagón Jr. was scheduled to take on L. A. Park in a rematch in the main event of Rise of the Renegades.

The card consisted of matches that resulted from scripted storylines, where wrestlers portrayed villains, heroes, or less distinguishable characters in scripted events that built tension and culminated in a wrestling match or series of matches, with results predetermined by MLW's writers. Storylines were played out on MLW's television program Fusion.

On December 14, it was announced that L. A. Park and the newly debuted Rush would compete in the main event of Rise of the Renegades. However, Rush signed a contract with Ring of Honor in 2019 and was pulled out of the event by ROH. Pentagon Jr. was named Rush's replacement, thus setting up a rematch between Park and Pentagon, as the two had competed in a match on the October 5 episode of Fusion, which was named the Match of the Year by MLW. The duo had also competed against each other in opposing teams on the November 30 episode of Fusion where Lucha Brothers (Pentagon Jr. and Rey Fénix) successfully defended the World Tag Team Championship against Los Parks (L. A. Park and El Hijo de L.A. Park).

On the July 20, 2018 episode of Fusion, Jimmy Havoc defeated Tom Lawlor in an Anything Goes match. Havoc took a hiatus from MLW in October until it was announced on February 25 that he would return to MLW at Rise of the Renegades. It was teased that Havoc wanted a title shot against Lawlor due to being the last person to have beaten him thus far. On March 5, it was announced that Havoc would receive a title shot against Lawlor for the World Heavyweight Championship in a New York City Street Fight at Rise of the Renegades.

On the February 16 episode of Fusion, Teddy Hart successfully defended the World Middleweight Championship against Maxwell Jacob Friedman. Friedman then attacked Hart during a post-match interview along with his new teammate Richard Holliday, thus forming a new team called The Dynasty and began feuding with The Hart Foundation. MJF took exception to Hart Foundation member Brian Pillman Jr. being awarded the 2018 Rookie of the Year by MLW management, which led to a match between the two at Rise of the Renegades. On the March 16 episode of Fusion, Alexander Hammerstone attacked Hart Foundation during their World Tag Team Championship title defense against Dynasty, which led to Hammerstone joining Dynasty. On March 18, MLW.com announced that Hart Foundation and Dynasty would compete in a six-man Tables match at Rise of the Renegades.

On March 7, it was announced that Sami Callihan would return to MLW to take on Mance Warner at Rise of the Renegades.

On March 13, MLW.com announced that Minoru Tanaka would make his MLW debut against Daga at Rise of the Renegades as part of a talent exchange partnership between MLW and Pro Wrestling Noah.

On March 14, a middleweight match was announced between El Hijo de L.A. Park and Gringo Loco to take place at Rise of the Renegades.

On the December 28 episode of Fusion, Ace Romero became the first wrestler to defeat Simon Gotch in the $20,000 Simon Gotch Prize Fight Challenge. This led to a brief feud between the two as they competed in a rematch on the March 9 episode of Fusion, where Gotch was disqualified after his Contra Unit teammates Jacob Fatu and Josef Samael attacked Romero. On March 19, it was announced that Romero would take on Samael at Rise of the Renegades. Contra's attack on Romero led to his friend Barrington Hughes challenging Contra member Jacob Fatu to a match, which was made official by MLW on April 1.

On March 21, it was announced that Rey Horus would take on Ace Austin in a middleweight match at Rise of the Renegades. The next day, another middleweight match was made for Rise of the Renegades between Rey Fénix and Air Wolf.

== Event ==
=== Preliminary matches ===
The opening match of the event pitted Ariel Dominguez against the debuting Bryan Idol. Dominguez executed a satellite DDT for the win.

Next, Kotto Brazil took on the debuting Jordan Oliver. Ricky Martinez and Salina de la Renta from Promociones Dorado interfered in the match by distracting Brazil but Brazil delivered a springboard diving crossbody to Martinez. The distraction allowed Oliver to hit a diving cutter to Brazil for the win.

Next, Brian Pillman Jr. took on Maxwell Jacob Friedman. Despite interference by Friedman's The Dynasty teammates, Pillman pinned MJF with a small package for the win.

Next, the undefeated Barrington Hughes took on Jacob Fatu. Near the end of the match, Fatu superkicked Hughes and nailed a springboard front flip senton to Hughes for the win thus ending his undefeated streak.

Next, Rey Horus took on Ace Austin. Horus hit Austin with a Super Victory Roll from the top rope for the win.

Next, the team of Low Ki and Ricky Martinez took on enhancement talents Chris Pagan and Troy Hollywood. Ki nailed a diving double foot stomp to Hollywood for the win. Contra Unit attacked Ki after the match while Martinez and Salina de la Renta turned on Ki by abandoning him instead of saving him from the assault.

Next, Myron Reed and Rich Swann took on the team of Jimmy Yuta and Lance Anoa'i. Reed and Swann hit 450 splashes on their both opponents for the win.

Next, Daga took on Minoru Tanaka. Tanaka applied a cross armbreaker and pinned Daga with a cradle while applying the hold for the win.

Next, The Dynasty (Alexander Hammerstone, Maxwell Jacob Friedman and Richard Holliday) took on The Hart Foundation (Brian Pillman Jr., Davey Boy Smith Jr. and Teddy Hart) in a Tables match. Near the end of the match, Holliday low blowed both Smith and Hart, leaving Pillman alone in the ring, which led to Hammerstone driving Pillman through a table in the corner with a running powerbomb.

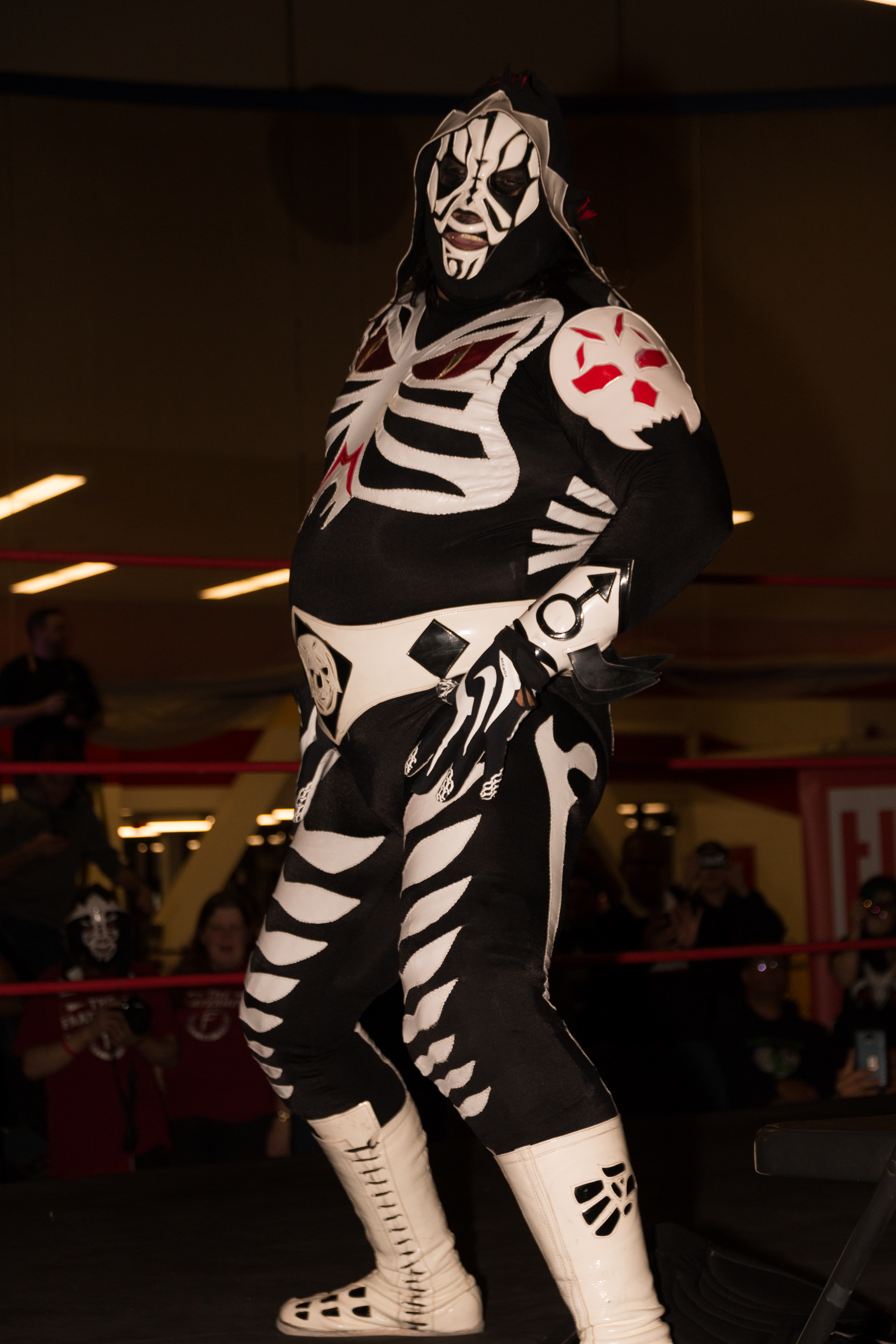
L. A. Park defeated Pentagon Jr. in the main event of Rise of the Renegades.

Next, Ace Romero took on Contra Unit member Josef Samael. Samael nailed a DDT and a kick to the face of Romero for the win.

Next, Puma King took on Gringo Loco. Near the end of the match, King tried to perform a diving hurricanrana on Loco but Loco countered it into a powerbomb and followed it by hitting a double underhook powerbomb for the win.

Next, Mance Warner took on Sami Callihan. The match ended in a no contest when El Hijo de L.A. Park and Ricky Martinez interfered in the match by attacking both men but Warner and Callihan cleared the ring to win the brawl.

Next, Rey Fénix took on Air Wolf. After countering the first Black Fire Driver by Fénix, Wolf countered a second Black Fire Driver into a roll-up and pinned him for the win.

The penultimate match was a street fight, in which Tom Lawlor defended the World Heavyweight Championship against Jimmy Havoc. Lawlor kneed Havoc with the chair in his jaw twice to win the match and retain the title.

=== Main event match ===
In the main event, L. A. Park took on Pentagon Jr. Salina de la Renta interfered on Park's behalf and Pentagon kissed her. Near the end of the match, Park hit a diving spin kick to Pentagon and a spear for the win.

== Aftermath ==
The duo of Barrington Hughes and Ace Romero continued their feud with Contra Unit as Contra Unit members Jacob Fatu and Josef Samael defeated the duo in a tag team match on the May 25 episode of Fusion.

Mance Warner and Sami Callihan joined forces as they began feuding with Promociones Dorado, defeating the group members El Hijo de LA Park and Ricky Martinez in a tag team match on the May 18 episode of Fusion.

The feud between The Dynasty and The Hart Foundation continued as Dynasty's Alexander Hammerstone defeated Hart Foundation's Brian Pillman Jr. in the finals of a four-man tournament to become the inaugural National Openweight Champion at Fury Road.

== Results ==
No.	Results	Stipulations
1^{FT}	Ariel Dominguez defeated Bryan Idol	Singles match (Fusion – May 11)
2^{FT}	Jordan Oliver defeated Kotto Brazil	Singles match (Fusion – April 27)
3^{FT}	Brian Pillman Jr. defeated Maxwell Jacob Friedman (with Alexander Hammerstone and Richard Holliday)	Singles match (Fusion – April 13)
4^{FT}	Jacob Fatu defeated Barrington Hughes	Singles match (Fusion – May 11)
5^{FT}	Rey Horus defeated Ace Austin	Singles match (Fusion – April 27)
6^{FT}	Low Ki and Ricky Martinez (with Salina de la Renta) defeated Chris Pagan and Troy Hollywood	Tag team match (Fusion – May 25)
7^{FT}	Myron Reed and Rich Swann defeated Jimmy Yuta and Lance Anoa'i	Tag team match (Fusion – April 13)
8^{FT}	Minoru Tanaka defeated Daga	Singles match (Fusion – May 18)
9^{FT}	The Dynasty (Alexander Hammerstone, Maxwell Jacob Friedman and Richard Holliday) defeated The Hart Foundation (Brian Pillman Jr., Davey Boy Smith Jr. and Teddy Hart)	Tables match (Fusion – April 27)
10^{FT}	Josef Samael defeated Ace Romero	Singles match (Fusion – April 20)
11^{FT}	Gringo Loco defeated Puma King	Singles match (Fusion – April 20)
12^{FT}	Mance Warner vs. Sami Callihan ended in a no contest	Singles match (Fusion – April 20)
13^{FT}	Air Wolf defeated Rey Fénix	Singles match (Fusion – May 11)
14^{FT}	Tom Lawlor (c) defeated Jimmy Havoc	Street Fight for the MLW World Heavyweight Championship (Battle Riot II – April 5)
15^{FT}	LA Park defeated Pentagon Jr.	Singles match (Fusion – May 4)
(c) / – the champion(s) heading into the match; FT / – the match was taped for a future broadcast of Fusion
