= Rise of the Renegades (2003) =

Professional wrestling event

- Promotion: Major League Wrestling
- Date: July 26, 2003
- City: Orlando, Florida
- Venue: Tabu Night Club
- Attendance: 880

Event chronology
← Previous; Hybrid Hell	Next → Summer Apocalypse

Rise of the Renegades chronology
← Previous; First	Next → 2019

Rise of the Renegades (2003) was a professional wrestling event produced by Major League Wrestling (MLW), which took place on July 26, 2003 at the Tabu Night Club in Orlando, Florida. The event was taped for future episodes of MLW Underground TV, which aired on Sunshine Network throughout the month of August 2003. It was the first event under the Rise of the Renegades chronology.

Twelve matches were contested on the card. The main event was a tag team match, in which the Global Crown Tag Team Champions The Extreme Horsemen (CW Anderson and Simon Diamond) took on The Sandman and Steve Williams, where if Sandman and Williams won then they would earn a title shot against Anderson and Diamond for the tag team titles but if they lost, they must leave MLW. Also on the undercard, Steve Corino defended the World Heavyweight Championship against Mike Awesome, Terry Funk took on Abdullah the Butcher and the team of Raven and Norman Smiley faced CM Punk and Michael Shane.

== Production ==
=== Background ===
In April 2003, Major League Wrestling signed a new deal with Sunshine Network to air its new television program Underground, which would feature matches from MLW's supercard events.

=== Storylines ===
The card consisted of matches that resulted from scripted storylines, where wrestlers portrayed villains, heroes, or less distinguishable characters in scripted events that built tension and culminated in a wrestling match or series of matches, with results predetermined by MLW's writers. Storylines were played out on MLW's television program Underground.

At Hybrid Hell, Mike Awesome defeated Satoshi Kojima to win the MLW World Heavyweight Championship. Steve Corino challenged Awesome to an immediate match for the title as he said that Awesome had promised him a title shot. Corino would defeat Awesome for the title with the help of his Extreme Horsemen teammates. On the July 7 episode of Underground, it was announced that Corino would defend the title against Awesome in a rematch at Rise of the Renegades.

At Hybrid Hell, Extreme Horsemen members CW Anderson and Simon Diamond defeated Steve Williams and D-Lo Brown to retain the MLW Global Crown Tag Team Championship. Later at the event, The Sandman made his MLW debut by rescuing Steve Williams and Terry Funk from an assault by Extreme Horsemen. On the July 11 episode of Underground, it was announced that Sandman and Williams would wrestle Anderson and Diamond in singles matches to earn a Global Crown Tag Team Championship opportunity.

At Hybrid Hell, Michael Shane helped CM Punk in defeating Raven in a match. Norman Smiley made the save for Raven after the match and challenged Shane and Punk to a tag team match against Raven and himself, which was made official for Rise of the Renegades on the July 11 episode of Underground.

At Hybrid Hell, Terry Funk defeated Steve Corino in a No Ropes Barbed Wire match. On the July 18 episode of Underground, Corino said that he was putting a bounty on Funk.

At Hybrid Hell, Sabu defeated his originally scheduled opponent La Parka's replacement Mikey Whipwreck in a match. He was attacked by Jerry Lynn and Christopher Daniels after the match and Whipwreck left with them. On the July 11 episode of Underground, Sabu was jumped by Lynn and Whipwreck, who slammed his face to the car door many times. This led to a rematch between Sabu and Whipwreck at Rise of the Renegades.

At Revolutions, the upstart Paul London defeated Jerry Lynn for an upset victory and was attacked by Lynn and Christopher Daniels after the match. On the July 11 episode of Underground, Joey Styles announced that Lynn and London would compete in a best of three series where if London won two matches then he would earn a MLW contract and if Lynn won then London must leave MLW. However, the idea was scrapped when London signed a contract with WWE, thus legitimately leaving MLW.

== Event ==
=== Preliminary matches ===
The opening match of the event was a tag team match pitting Los Maximos (Joel Maximo and Jose Maximo) against Jimmy Yang and Tony Mamaluke. Maximos hit a Spanish fly to Mamaluke from the top rope for the win.

Next, Josh Daniels took on Richard J. Criado. Near the end of the match, Criado missed a splash on Daniels in the corner and Daniels hit a dragon suplex for the win.

Next, Da Hit Squad were supposed to take on The Samoan Island Tribe (Mana and Samu) in a match but they attacked the Samoan Island Tribe before the match started. After brawling with each other outside the ring, both teams went to the ring to begin the match but the match went out of control when the Samoan Island Tribe took the referee out and brawled with Da Hit Squad, which resulted in the match ending in a no contest.

Next, one half of the Global Crown Tag Team Champions CW Anderson took on Steve Williams in a match, which stipulated that if Williams or The Sandman won their respective matches against Anderson and his tag team championship partner Simon Diamond, then they would earn a tag team title shot against Anderson and Diamond. Williams nailed a backdrop driver to Anderson for the win.

Next, Jerry Lynn was supposed to take on Paul London but London was unable to compete due to his signing with WWE and Lynn berated London in a promo. Homicide would show up to replace London as Lynn's opponent. Near the end of the match, Sinister Minister caught Homicide on the top rope, allowing Lynn to nail a hurricanrana from the top rope but Homicide countered it into a roll-up and pinned Lynn for the win.

Next, the Global Crown Tag Team Champion Simon Diamond took on The Sandman. CW Anderson interfered in the match as the referee was distracted by Diamond and superkicked Sandman, allowing Diamond to nail a Gem Cutter on Sandman for the win.

Next, Sabu took on Mikey Whipwreck. Near the end of the match, Sabu applied a camel clutch on Whipwreck but Whipwreck's manager Sinister Minister distracted Sabu, allowing Whipwreck to hit Sabu with a chair and he smashed Sabu's arm with the chair and pinned him for the win.

Next, Richard J. Criado issued an open challenge for a match, which was answered by Nosawa. Criado nailed a sitout scoop slam piledriver on Nosawa for the win.

Next, the team of Norman Smiley and Raven took on CM Punk and Michael Shane. Raven had the match won as he performed a Raven Effect on Punk and covered him for the pinfall but Punk's valet Francine broke up the win, which led to Raven and Smiley's valet GI Ho interfering in the match. Shane knocked her out by superkicking her and then he hit Smiley with a chair and attempted to hit Raven with it but Raven ducked it and the chair accidentally hit Shane by bouncing off the top rope. Raven attempted to nail a Raven Effect on Shane but Punk threw powder in his eyes and nailed a DDT to Raven for the win.

Later, Terry Funk came to wrestle for the bounty that Steve Corino had issued on Funk's head and Corino revealed that it would be Abdullah the Butcher but said that he did not need Abdullah to take his own bounty and distracted Funk enough for Abdullah to attack him from behind to begin the match. After a back and forth action, Funk hit a crossbody on Abdullah for the win.

=== World championship match ===
The initially scheduled main event for Rise of the Renegades pitted Steve Corino defending the World Heavyweight Championship against Mike Awesome. Extreme Horsemen interfered in the match to attack Awesome but Terry Funk made the save by attacking everyone with a garbage can. He threw a chair at Corino but Corino ducked and the chair hit Awesome instead, allowing Corino to pin Awesome to retain the title. Extreme Horsemen attacked Funk after the match until The Sandman and Steve Williams made the save, challenging Extreme Horsemen to a tag team match.

=== Main event match ===
The tag team match pitted The Sandman and Steve Williams against CW Anderson and Simon Diamond as the main event of the show, which stipulated that if Sandman or Williams lost then they would be forced to leave MLW. Funk interfered in the match by nailing stunners to Extreme Horsemen. Sandman nailed a Rolling Rock to Diamond for the win.

== Aftermath ==
The Sandman and Steve Williams received their Global Crown Tag Team Championship title opportunity against CW Anderson and Simon Diamond at Summer Apocalypse, where Anderson and Diamond retained.

The feud between CM Punk and Raven continued at Summer Apocalypse, where Punk defeated Raven in a Straight Edge Rules match. Norman Smiley and GI Ho would take on Michael Shane and Francine in a mixed tag team match, which the latter team won.

The feud between Da Hit Squad and Samoan Island Tribe would lead to a falls count anywhere match between the two teams at Summer Apocalypse, where B-Boy replaced a no-showing Dan Maff. Samoan Island Tribe would win the match.

At Summer Apocalypse, Steve Corino issued a bounty of $25,000 on Terry Funk and Jerry Lawler offered to take the bounty and went on to defeat Funk.

== Results ==
No.	Results	Stipulations
1	Los Maximos (Joel Maximo and Jose Maximo) defeated Jimmy Yang and Tony Mamaluke	Tag team match
2	Josh Daniels defeated Richard J. Criado	Singles match
3	Da Hit Squad (Mafia and Monsta Mack) vs. The Samoan Island Tribe (Mana and Samu) ended in a no contest	Tag team match
4	Steve Williams defeated CW Anderson	Singles match to earn a future Global Crown Tag Team Championship opportunity
5	Homicide defeated Jerry Lynn (with The Sinister Minister)	Young Lions Challenge match
6	Simon Diamond defeated The Sandman	Singles match to earn a future Global Crown Tag Team Championship opportunity
7	Mikey Whipwreck (with The Sinister Minister) defeated Sabu (with Bill Alfonso)	Singles match
8	Richard J. Criado defeated Nosawa	Singles match
9	CM Punk and Michael Shane (with Francine) defeated Norman Smiley and Raven (with GI Ho)	Tag team match
10	Terry Funk defeated Abdullah the Butcher	Singles match
11	Steve Corino (c) defeated Mike Awesome	Singles match for the MLW World Heavyweight Championship
12	Steve Williams and The Sandman defeated The Extreme Horsemen (CW Anderson and Simon Diamond)	Tag team match
(c) / – the champion(s) heading into the match
