= AAA Hall of Fame =

Professional wrestling hall of fame

- Established: 2007
- Founder: Lucha Libre AAA Worldwide
- Inductees: 23 total inductees

The AAA Hall of Fame is a hall of fame which honors professional wrestlers and wrestling personalities, established and maintained by the Mexico-based professional wrestling promotion Lucha Libre AAA Worldwide (AAA).

== Inductees ==
| Year | Ring name (Birth name) | AAA recognized accolades |
|---|---|---|
| 2007 | Antonio Peña | Posthumous inductee; Founder of AAA |
| 2007 | Rey Misterio Jr. (Óscar Gutiérrez) | One-time Mexican National Welterweight Champion; One-time Mexican National Trios Champion |
| 2008 | Eddie Guerrero (Eduardo Guerrero) | Posthumous inductee; Member of the Guerrero wrestling family; One-time AAA/IWC World Tag Team Champion |
| 2009 | Pepe "Tropi" Casas (José Casas Granados) | Patriarch of the Casas wrestling family; A referee from 1987 to 2015 |
| 2011 | Octagón (Juan Escalera) | Four-time Mexican National Middleweight Champion; One-time Mexican National Tag Team Champion; One-time AAA/IWC World Tag Team Champion; One-time Mexican National Trios Champion |
| 2012 | Perro Aguayo (Pedro Aguayo Damián) | One-time AAA Campeón de Campeones Champion; One-time IWC World Heavyweight Champion; One-time Mexican National Heavyweight Champion; One-time Mexican National Middleweight Champion; Two-time Mexican National Tag Team Champion; One-time Rey de Reyes winner |
| 2013 | Abismo Negro (Andrés González) | Posthumous inductee; One-time Mexican National Middleweight Champion; One-time AAA Mascot Tag Team Champion; Two-time Mexican National Tag Team Champion; One-time Rey de Reyes winner |
| 2014 | El Brazo (Juan Alvarado Nieves) | Posthumous inductee; Member of the Alvarado wrestling family; Member of the Los Brazos stable |
| 2014 | Rayo de Jalisco Sr. (Máximino Linares Moreno) | Long-time luchador who wrestled for various promotions from 1955–1989 |
| 2015 | Héctor Garza (Héctor Solano Segura) | Posthumous inductee; Two-time IWC World Heavyweight Champion; Two-time Mexican National Heavyweight Champion (died while holding the title); One-time Mexican National Light Heavyweight Champion; One-time Mexican National Tag Team Champion |
| 2015 | El Hijo del Perro Aguayo (Pedro Aguayo Ramírez) | Posthumous inductee; One-time Mexican National Light Heavyweight Champion; One-time Mexican National Atómicos Champion; Three-time Mexican National Tag Team Champion; Copa Triplemanía XXII winner; One-time Rey de Reyes winner |
| 2016 | Art Barr (Arthur Leon Barr) | Posthumous inductee; One-time AAA/IWC World Tag Team Champion |
| 2016 | Joaquín Roldán | AAA's Director General from 2007–2017 |
| 2018 | Villano III (Arturo Díaz Mendoza) | Posthumous inductee; Two-time AAA Americas Trios Champion; One-time Mexican National Atómicos Champion Known for being part of the Los Villanos stable |
| 2018 | El Apache (Mario Balbuena González) | Posthumous inductee; Two-time AAA World Mixed Tag Team Champion; One-time AAA World Trios Champion |
| 2018 | Dr. Alfonso Morales; Gilberto Alfonso Morales Villela | Announcer known for his work in AAA and CMLL |
| 2019 | Silver King (César Cuauhtémoc González Barrón) | Posthumous inductee; One-time AAA World Tag Team Champion |
| 2020 | La Parka (Jesús Alfonso Huerta Escoboza) | Posthumous inductee; Two-time Mexican National Cruiserweight Champion; One-time Mexican National Atómicos Champion; Five-time Rey de Reyes winner; Copa Triplemanía XXV winner |
| 2022 | Arturo "El Rudo" Rivera (José Arturo Rivera García) | Posthumous inductee; Long-time sports journalist; Broadcaster for AAA and CMLL |
| 2022 | Blue Demon (Alejandro Muñoz Moreno) | Posthumous inductee; Two-time NWA World Welterweight Champion; Three-time Mexican National Welterweight Champion; One-time Mexican National Tag Team Champion; Starred in over 20 Luchador films |
| 2023 | Cassandro (Saúl Armendáriz) | One-time UWA World Lightweight Champion |
| 2024 | Nicho el Millonario (Dionicio Castellanos Torres) | One-time AAA World Tag Team Champion; Two-time Mexican National Welterweight Champion |
| 2025 | Konnan (Charles Ashenoff) | One-time AAA Americas Heavyweight Champion; One-time IWC World Heavyweight Champion; One-time and inaugural CMLL World Heavyweight Champion |
| 2026 | Marisela Peña | AAA President since 2007 |

== See also ==
- List of professional wrestling halls of fame
