= MLW Rise of the Renegades =

Rise of the Renegades
- Promotions: Major League Wrestling
- First event: Rise of the Renegades (2003)

Rise of the Renegades is a professional wrestling supercard event first held by Major League Wrestling (MLW) in 2003.

A second event was produced sixteen years later in 2019 as a set of television tapings for MLW's television program, Fusion. The event's name was used in 2022 for a special episode of Fusion, but it featured matches taped from the MLW Azteca Underground event held on April 1 of that year.

== Dates and venues ==
#	Event	Date	City	Venue	Main event
1	Rise of the Renegades (2003)	July 26, 2003	Orlando, Florida	Tabu Night Club	"Dr. Death" Steve Williams and The Sandman vs. The Extreme Horsemen (CW Anderson and Simon Diamond)
2	Rise of the Renegades (2019)	April 4, 2019	Queens, New York City, New York	Melrose Ballroom	LA Park vs. Pentagon Jr.
3	Rise of the Renegades (2022)	April 1, 2022 (aired June 9, 2022)	Dallas, Texas	Gilley's	The Von Hammers (Alexander Hammerstone, Marshall Von Erich and Ross Von Erich) vs. King Muertes, Mads Krügger and Richard Holliday
