= Konnan =

Professional wrestler (born 1964)

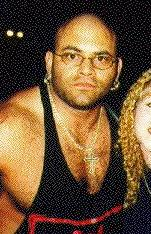
- Konnan c. 1999

Personal information
- Born: Carlos Santiago Espada Moises; January 6, 1964 (age 62) Santiago, Oriente Province, Cuba
- Relative: Dominik Mysterio (godson)

Professional wrestling career
- Ring name(s): The Comet Kid; Conan the Barbarian; El Centurión; The Incredible Hulk; K-Dawg; Konan; Konnan; Konnan el Barbaro; Konnan the Great; The Latin Fury; The New Max Moon; El Relámpago
- Billed height: 178 cm (5 ft 10 in)
- Billed weight: 108 kg (238 lb)
- Billed from: Mexico City, Mexico
- Trained by: Super Astro; Negro Casas; Rey Misterio Sr.
- Debut: February 24, 1988
- Retired: August 3, 2019
- Military service
- Allegiance: United States
- Branch: United States Navy
- Unit: USS Cape Cod (AD-43)

Charles Ashenoff (born Carlos Santiago Espada Moises; January 6, 1964), better known by his ring name Konnan, is a Cuban-born American professional wrestling personality, manager, and former professional wrestler. During a career spanning almost three decades, he has wrestled for independent and national promotions in the United States and Mexico, and held fifteen title belts in nine promotions. He was also involved in the creation of Lucha Underground, where he was supposed to serve as a writer and producer, but ended up in an on-camera role as manager to Prince Puma throughout the first season. Outside of wrestling, Konnan is an occasional rapper.

He is best known to United States audiences for his run in World Championship Wrestling as part of the nWo stable and as part of The Filthy Animals. He also formed the 3 Live Kru for Total Nonstop Action Wrestling (TNA) in the early 2000s and later the Latin American Xchange (LAX) stable there. In Mexico, Konnan was the first-ever CMLL World Heavyweight Champion, and the leader of the Foreign Legion in AAA when they were the top stable.

Konnan has been inducted into both the AAA and TNA Hall of Fame.

== Early life ==
Konnan was born Carlos Santiago Espada Moises in Santiago, Oriente Province (now part of the present day Santiago de Cuba Province), Cuba, of Puerto Rican and Cuban descent. In 1966, he and his mother arrived in Boston. Soon after landing in Boston, she met a young half-Jewish, half-Puerto Rican private investigator from New York named Richard Ashenoff. They soon married, and raised Carlos together. By 1967, the family relocated to Carol City in South Florida. When Richard formally adopted Carlos, he listed Carlos's legal name as Charles Ashenoff.

By 1976, under the influence of older friends and neighbors, Ashenoff had gotten into stealing cars. He learned how to drive at 12, learned to box, and was an "avid weightlifter". Ashenoff was expelled from several schools before landing at Southwest Miami Senior High School. In 1982, he graduated a year early from Southwest Miami, and was arrested and charged as a juvenile with credit card theft and motorcycle theft. Shortly after his 18th birthday, Ashenoff was caught selling drugs and charged as an adult. He was given a choice of going to jail or entering the military. He chose the latter, joining the United States Navy.

After boot camp, Ashenoff was relocated to San Diego, and assigned to a destroyer tender in the Pacific Fleet – the USS Cape Cod (AD-43). He won the California state (amateur) Middleweight Boxing Championship in 1983. He set a goal to qualify for the Junior Olympics in boxing, but injured his shoulder in training and was deployed to the Middle East subsequent to the U.S. Embassy bombing in Beirut on April 18, 1983. His ship was in the Strait of Hormuz when the US Marine barracks (along with the French paratrooper barracks) were bombed on October 24, 1983. By 1984, the Cape Cod was rotated out of the Persian Gulf. Ashenoff returned to San Diego, and received an honorable discharge. (Note: The Wrestling Observer article indicates that Ashenoff was discharged in 1989, but SLAM! indicates he served four years, which would be 1986.)

== Professional wrestling career ==
=== Early career (1988–1996) ===
In San Diego, Konnan met John Roberts. (Note: SLAM! claims "A man by the name of John Roberts, looking for new lucha talent, "discovered" Konnan and directed him to Rey Misterio Sr., who trained Konnan for the wrestling ring." Meltzer says "In January 1988, a man Carlos had never met saw Carlos boxing at a gym that also trained wrestlers. The man, John Roberts, was a psycho fan and had no connection whatsoever with any wrestling promotion.") Dave Meltzer of the Wrestling Observer Newsletter then details Ashenoff's first foray in to professional wrestling:

Carlos traveled to Tijuana on Wednesday, January 6, 1988, (his 24th birthday), where he was led to the dressing area and introduced to Manuel de los Santos, the promoter of the show, and who also wrestled in the main event as "Kiss". De los Santos took one look at the 215-pound bodybuilder and did the classic double-take—what the hell is this guy doing here, and, how quickly can I get this guy in the ring. Konnan introduced himself and explained how he was brought here by his manager/agent, John Roberts. Roberts had already bragged to de los Santos that Carlos had been a wrestler in Florida. Suddenly, a big roar (laughter) went up from another wrestler, Miguel Lopez, who wrestled as Rey Misterio. Lopez/Misterio explained to Carlos that Roberts was just a nutty fan, always in the front row, but that he did nothing involved with managing or agent-ing or anything else in the business. Still, the wrestlers asked Carlos, want to give it a try?

Billed as El Centurión ("The Centurion"), Ashenoff debuted for the Universal Wrestling Association (UWA) on January 6, 1988.

In the early part of his career, he wrestled for many different promotions. After making his debut for UWA, Konnan wrestled for the UWA Heavyweight title against El Canek at UWA 14 on January 29, 1989, and wrestled six- and eight-man tag matches intermittently for the promotion until 1994, with the likes of Dos Caras, Mascara Sagrada, and others. All of his matches for UWA after 1991 were cross-promotions with EMLL and AAA.

Konnan wrestled in a six-man, two out of three falls, tag team match as Konnan El Barbaro ("Konnan the Barbarian") with Lizmark and Yoshihiro Asai against As Charro, Indio Yori and Negro Casas on February 3, 1989, for World Wrestling Association. Konnan joined Empresa Mexicana de la Lucha Libre (EMLL) later that year. He used Konnan El Barbaro with EMLL as well. (Note: Meltzer states that "Konnan El Barbaro" originated in a match subsequent to the Lizmark match, which would appear to show that the name originated with an EMLL event. He writes, "Carlos was promoted as El Centurion and The Incredible Hulk and worked his way up the cards quickly. On his 24th birthday, he had his official debut match at the Auditorio Municipal in Tijuana....within 14 months, he had already won his first mask versus hair match, defeating As Charro in Tijuana on February 24, 1989. Word came to Tijuana that the promoter in Ciudad Juarez (right across the border from El Paso, Texas) was looking for fresh talent. Carlos went to Juarez, and arrived the day of a card. The promoter looked at him and immediately sent him out to run in on one of the day's matches. The next week came Carlos' debut –– but no one gave the ring announcer a heads up first. The ring announcer, not having this wrestler's name, but seeing the mask and the physique, and recalling movies he had seen, introduced Carlos as "Conan El Barbaro".)

Konnan's first stint with World Championship Wrestling lasted only a few weeks. His debut was at Starrcade on December 16, 1990. Teaming with his trainer and mentor, Rey Misterio, Konnan entered the Pat O'Connor Memorial International Cup Tag Team Tournament held at the event. They defeated Norman Smiley and Chris Adams in the quarter-finals, but lost to eventual winners, the Steiner Brothers (Rick and Scott) in the semi-finals. He then won a televised match on WCW Power Hour against Chuck Coates on January 19, 1991. Konnan would not return to the promotion until 1996.

While still part of WCW, Konnan was contacted by talent scout Pat Patterson on New Year's Eve 1990, which led to a meeting with Vince McMahon, where the initial idea for what became Max Moon was discussed. According to Konnan, "When I was wrestling in Japan, I saw this Japanese anime cartoon robot on TV that shot confetti and fire. [Vince] asked if I knew anybody that could design it." Konnan was given an outfit (purchased by the WWF at the cost of $15,000) bedecked with circuitry and a pyrotechnic gun that shot sparkles into the crowd. Konnan recollected later that the costs associated with the costume led to problems between himself and the promotion right from the start.

Days later he received a tryout on January 7, 1991, at a WWF Superstars taping in Amarillo, Texas defeating Ultraman. He returned again on March 26 in Las Vegas, Nevada, defeating Louie Spicolli in a WWF Superstars dark match. He would defeat Spicolli again one night later at a Wrestling Challenge taping in Reno. Konnan returned again on January 7, 1992, at a WWF Superstars taping in Daytona Beach, FL. wrestling this time as The Latin Fury, he defeated The Heartbreaker. The next day he defeated The Juicer in a dark match at a Wrestling Challenge taping in Fort Myers, Florida. Konnan would wrestle twice more as The Latin Fury, the final time at a house show in Hyannis, Massachusetts on July 19, 1992, when he defeated Pete Doherty.

The next day, when he appeared at a WWF Superstars taping in Worcester, Massachusetts against The Mercenary, he was renamed El Relámpago. He wrestled again as El Relámpago the following night against Luis Mendieta.

A little over a month later he received the gimmick that he would become known for, Max Moon (although he was originally called The Comet Kid for a handful of appearances). The Moon character, created by Konnan, was that of a cyborg from "The Future" or "Outer Space".

Back in EMLL, Konnan lost his mask to Perro Aguayo in a Lucha de Apuesta mask versus hair match. on June 9, 1991, by disqualification. After the match, a young boy—introduced as Konnan's brother—entered the ring crying and handed Konnan his mask back, generating considerable bonhomie towards Konnan from the sympathetic crowd.

In 1991, EMLL changed its name officially to Consejo Mundial de Lucha Libre (CMLL). Konnan then became the first-ever CMLL World Heavyweight Champion later that year by winning a tournament consisting of four matches at four events: an eight-man elimination match for the first round on May 24, 1991; a four-man battle royal quarterfinal on May 31; a two-out-of-three falls semifinal match on June 7; and finally, a two-out-of-three falls match against Cien Caras at EMLL Super Viernes in Mexico City on June 9, 1991.

In 1992, Konnan, along with several other EMLL wrestlers, joined Asistencia Asesoría y Administración (AAA). Shortening his ring name to simply "Konnan", he feuded with Cien Caras.

Back in AAA, following interference from Jake Roberts, Konnan lost a two out of three falls retirement match by count-out to Caras at Triplemanía I on April 30, 1993, in front of 48,000 fans in Mexico City, setting the all-time attendance record for a Mexican wrestling event. Konnan did not comply with the stipulations of the match and returned to defeat Roberts in a hair versus hair match at Triplemanía II on May 27, 1994, in Tijuana.

Later in 1994, Konnan began a storyline where he betrayed his tag team partner, Perro Aguayo, and formed a heel alliance known as Los Gringos Locos with Eddie Guerrero, Art Barr and Madonna's Boyfriend. Aguayo gained his revenge on Konnan by defeating him in the only AAA pay-per-view, When Worlds Collide, in a steel cage match. He eventually became the AAA booker. Konnan defeated Killer on February 2, 1996, in Querétaro to become the first ever AAA Heavyweight Champion. He vacated the title after leaving AAA in October 1996 to form his own promotion, Promo Azteca, and the title remained inactive until 2004. Konnan's Mexican wrestling career was hampered in the late-1990s by his American wrestling commitments, and Promo Azteca closed in 1998. He made a return to the Mexican wrestling circuit in the 2000s after a six-year absence, selling out arenas in Mexico City and Guadalajara.

=== World Wrestling Federation (1992–1993) ===
Konnan made his WWF debut on September 1, 1992, in Hershey, Pennsylvania, during a Superstars taping under the name The Comet Kid when he pinned Barry Horowitz. After three televised matches, Konnan abruptly left the WWF following a disagreement with WWF owner Vince McMahon in 1992. Konnan was not showing up for WWF events due to his rising fame in Mexico, and his supposed "bad attitude" and heat from fellow WWF workers leading to a very strained relationship with McMahon, who had invested heavily in the Max Moon character, both financially and creatively, up until that point. However, he left a mark on the WWF by teaching the sharpshooter to Bret Hart.

Konnan was still working in Mexico while under contract to WWF, and was also simultaneously appearing in a Mexican telenovela aimed at children called El abuelo y yo. As he was becoming more popular in Mexico, he was not as focused on making it in America. Konnan recollected, "Wrestling was so hot in Mexico, because they had lifted this 30-year ban on wrestling on TV in Mexico City. I was able to capitalize on that wrestling boom. I was wrestling three times in one day on many weekends. The amount of work was incredible. It was like when Raw and Nitro were going head-to-head and there was work for everybody."

There was also some locker room tension over the costs associated with the costume, Konnan's perceived attitude, and Konnan also was missing tapings because he was more successful in Mexico and was not focusing on WWF. In the end, the Max Moon character was given to Paul Diamond, who appeared as the character on the first episode of Monday Night Raw on January 11, 1993. After a brief run, the character was abandoned.

=== Extreme Championship Wrestling (1995) ===
After meeting Extreme Championship Wrestling (ECW) booker Paul Heyman while on a wrestling tour of Singapore, Konnan joined ECW in 1995 and feuded with The Sandman. He appeared at ECW November to Remember on November 18, 1995, squashing Jason Knight. He also wrestled at an event co-promoted by ECW and the AAA in Chicago, Illinois.

=== World Championship Wrestling (1996–2001) ===
==== United States Heavyweight Champion; Dungeon of Doom (1996–1997) ====
Konnan returned to WCW on a full-time basis on the January 22, 1996, edition of Nitro, where he announced that he would defend his "Mexican Heavyweight Championship" against Psicosis, the following night at Clash of the Champions, where Konnan retained the title. As a WCW employee, he was largely responsible for the hiring of several prominent Mexican wrestlers by WCW, including Rey Mysterio Jr., Psicosis, Juventud Guerrera and La Parka. Konnan defeated One Man Gang for the WCW United States Heavyweight Championship on January 29, 1996. During his reign, he continued to defend his IWAS and AAA Heavyweight Championships in Mexico (these championships were billed as a "Mexican Heavyweight Title" wherever Konnan wore one or the other to a WCW ring). Konnan successfully defended the United States Heavyweight Championship against One Man Gang at SuperBrawl VI, Eddie Guerrero at Uncensored, Jushin Liger at Slamboree and El Gato at The Great American Bash before losing the title to Ric Flair on July 7 at Bash at the Beach following interference from Flair's valets Miss Elizabeth and Woman.

Several months after losing the United States Championship, Konnan became a villain and joined the Dungeon of Doom. However, the gimmick was already on its way out. According to Kevin Sullivan (the originator of the stable), speaking in a retrospective interview in July 2016, Konnan "didn't fit in The Dungeon of Doom. He was forced into it." Sullivan also praised Konnan highly: [He's] a fabulous performer and has a great mind for the wrestling business. He should have been on his own. Putting him with us, he just lost all the steam he had. He brought the luchadors into WCW, so he had a real effect on professional wrestling."

==== New World Order; World Television Champion (1997–1999) ====
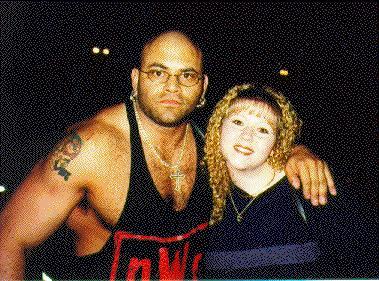
Konnan in 1998 as a member of the nWo Wolfpac with a fan

Konnan joined the New World Order (nWo) on July 14, 1997. Konnan developed an increasingly hip-hop based gimmick and was nicknamed "K-Dogg." During his first stint in the nWo, Konnan feuded with the Luchadores whom he had brought to WCW. During this storyline, he wrestled in a Mexican Death match at Road Wild against Rey Mysterio, Jr. and a match against Juventud Guerrera at Uncensored in March 1998.

When the nWo divided into two rival factions on the May 4, 1998, episode of Nitro, Konnan sided with the nWo Wolfpac, led by Kevin Nash. The Wolfpac feuded with nWo Hollywood, led by Hollywood Hogan and became tweeners. On the November 30, 1998, episode of Nitro, Konnan defeated Chris Jericho for the WCW World Television Championship. His reign lasted until December 28, 1998, when he lost to nWo Hollywood member Scott Steiner on Nitro following interference from Buff Bagwell.

==== No Limit Soldiers; Filthy Animals (1999–2001) ====
When the two halves of the nWo reunited in January 1999, Konnan was thrown out of the nWo for standing up for Rey Mysterio Jr and was attacked by Lex Luger. A week later he would enter the ring using the "Psycho" theme music which would later on becoming Rey Mysterio's theme song after his unmasking and the Filthy Animals theme for a while till it was replaced with "The Reason". He became a face and teamed with Mysterio to fight the nWo. After feuding with nWo member Lex Luger, Konnan and Mysterio, Jr. were defeated by The Outsiders at SuperBrawl IX, with The Outsiders removing Mysterio's mask in the process. Konnan later criticized WCW for not respecting Mexican wrestling culture by writing storylines that saw several Mexican wrestlers unceremoniously unmasked (Juventud Guerrera, Psicosis, and Mysterio). He compared asking a luchador to remove their mask to "going to Japan and telling the Japanese they have to eat with a fork instead of chopsticks."

Konnan spent several months feuding with Disco Inferno, and then he began a rivalry with Stevie Ray. He and Mysterio formed an alliance with Master P and his No Limit Soldiers and fought with The West Texas Rednecks. After Master P left WCW, Konnan formed a stable known as The Filthy Animals. He and Mysterio, representing the Filthy Animals, defeated Harlem Heat (Booker T and Stevie Ray) for the WCW World Tag Team Championship on October 18, 1999. They were scheduled to defend the titles against Harlem Heat in the MGM Grand Garden Arena on October 24, 1999, at Halloween Havoc, but on the night of the event Mysterio was announced as being injured. The title was then contested in a three-way tag match pitting Konnan and Billy Kidman, representing the Filthy Animals, against Harlem Heat and the First Family (Hugh Morrus and Brian Knobs). Harlem Heat regained the title after Stevie Ray pinned Morrus. Konnan and Kidman defeated Harlem Heat for the title the next night on Nitro, but lost to Harris Brothers (Ron and Don Harris) on November 22, 1999.

Konnan was inactive throughout early 2000, as he was suspended for three months by Bill Busch after requesting his release from WCW, unhappy with the way he was being used. Shortly after returning from suspension and reforming the Filthy Animals, Konnan was sidelined once again, this time with a legitimately torn triceps muscle, damaged when Van Hammer threw Juventud Guerrera at him during a match and Guerrera's elbow connected with Konnan's upper arm as he attempted to catch him. Throughout 2000, the Filthy Animals feuded with other stables, including The Misfits In Action, The Natural Born Thrillers and Team Canada. At WCW's final pay-per-view event, Greed on March 18, 2001, Lance Storm and Mike Awesome (representing Team Canada) defeated Hugh Morrus and Konnan. The assets of WCW were sold to the World Wrestling Federation (WWF) five days later, on March 23.

=== Independent circuit (2001–2003) ===
Following the sale of WCW, Konnan returned to wrestling for multiple independent promotions. He first went to Xtreme Pro Wrestling (XPW), where he took part in a tournament for the then-vacant XPW Television title on August 25, 2001. He defeated Johnny Webb and Vic Grimes in the first and second rounds, respectively, and then lost the final to Kaos. He then wrestled a match with Damian Steele on October 13, 2001. He wrestled Steele again on November 24, 2001, in a "Loser Leaves XPW" match at XPW Revolution at Grand Olympic Auditorium in Los Angeles, California. Konnan won the match.

Konnan wrestled in Australia, the UK, and Germany for World Wrestling All-Stars from October to December 2001. His first match with the promotion was October 19, 2001, where he defeated Gangrel. He would win two further matches against Gangrel during his time at the promotion, but his singles record was generally poor: he lost in the first round of the WWA Heavyweight Championship title in a dog collar match against Road Dogg on October 26, 2001, and lost three tables matches against Norman Smiley on December 8, 9 and 11, 2001. Konnan's tag-team record was much better: Konnan went 6–0 teamed with Nathan Jones (exclusively against the team of Lenny Lane and Lodi, better-known formerly as The West Hollywood Blondes in WCW) between November 27 – December 11, 2001.

After a no-contest match against Sandman on January 12, 2002, at XPW New Year's Revolution 2, Konnan then went to World Wrestling Council, where he won the World Wrestling Council World Tag Team Championship with Carly Colón, defeating Thunder and Lightning on May 26, 2002.

Konnan appeared on the inaugural Total Nonstop Action Wrestling (TNA) pay-per-view on June 19, 2002, in the Von Braun Center in Huntsville, Alabama. He entered the Gauntlet for the Gold match for the vacant NWA World Heavyweight Championship, but he was chokeslammed and subsequently eliminated by Malice. He then went to Maximum Xtreme Pro Wrestling, where he lost another heavyweight title match; this time against Simon Diamond for the MXPW Heavyweight Title on August 12, 2002. He lost yet another title match upon returning to World Wrestling Council, losing by disqualification to Carly Colón in a match for the Universal Heavyweight title at WWC 29th Aniversario on September 14, 2002. Konnan finally won the title by defeating Colón on November 2, 2002, only to lose the title back to Colón 21 days later.

Returning to World Wrestling All-Stars in November and December 2002, Konnan defeated Norman Smiley twice in singles matches on November 28 and 29, 2002, and won in three minutes against Nate Webb on December 6, 2002, at WWA The Retribution in Glasgow. Subsequent to that, Konnan tag-teamed with Smiley against Disco Inferno and Malice for three matches between December 8–13, 2002, and won all three.

Konnan made two final appearances for World Wrestling All-Stars in May 2003, before the promotion folded. He also wrestled a tag match teamed with Norman Smiley for MXPW in September 2003. These would be his last extended stints in the independent circuit for nearly a decade.

=== Total Nonstop Action Wrestling (2003–2007; 2017–2019; 2026) ===
==== Authentic Luchadores and 3 Live Kru (2003–2005) ====
Konnan returned to TNA on February 12, 2003, and formed a short-lived villainous alliance, the Authentic Luchadores, with fellow Hispanic wrestlers Juventud Guerrera, Super Crazy and The S.A.T.(Spanish Announce Team). The stable feuded with Jerry Lynn until April 2, 2003, when Lynn claimed that he had been heavily influenced by lucha libre and that he respected his Mexican opponents, thus earning the friendship of Konnan.

Throughout May and June 2003, Konnan began teaming with B.G. James and Ron Killings, and in July 2003 the trio formed a stable known as the 3 Live Kru. The Kru first wrestled as a unit on August 13, 2003, defeating The New Church (Sinn, Vampire Warrior and Tempest). On November 26, the Kru defeated Simon Diamond, Johnny Swinger and Glenn Gilberti in a six-man tag team match with the vacant NWA World Tag Team Championships on the line. The championship was held by all three members of the Kru, until January 28, 2004, when they were defeated by Kevin Northcutt and Legend in Nashville. After several abortive attempts to regain the tag title, the Kru began supporting Ron Killings's bid to become NWA World Heavyweight Champion. The Kru later feuded with Jarrett's mercenaries, The Elite Guard (Chad Collyer, Hotstuff Hernandez, and Onyx).

While with TNA, Konnan also returned to Asistencia Asesoría y Administración, making his first appearance at AAA Sin Limite - Guerra De Titanes 2004 on May 12, 2004. Konnan was teamed with Rikishi and lost to Cibernetico and La Parka by disqualification.

On July 14, 2004, the 3 Live Kru, Dusty Rhodes and Larry Zbyszko defeated Jarrett, Ken Shamrock and the Elite Guard in a ten-man tag team match. The Kru began feuding with Team Canada in August 2004, and at the inaugural three-hour TNA pay-per-view, Victory Road on November 7, 2004, Konnan and James defeated Team Canada members Bobby Roode and "Showtime" Eric Young for the NWA World Tag Team Championship. Their reign lasted one month, with Team Canada regaining the title on December 5, 2004, at Turning Point with the help of the injured Johnny Devine.

Throughout early 2005, the Kru feuded with Michael Shane and Kazarian, Team Canada and The Naturals. Dissension arose after James's former tag team partner from the WWF, Billy Gunn, joined TNA as "The New Age Outlaw" and began trying to convince James to reform their highly successful tag team, the New Age Outlaws. Konnan and Killings feuded with The Outlaw and "The Alpha Male" Monty Brown, with James's loyalties divided. From March 2005 onwards, Konnan was also feuding with Vampiro and La Parka in AAA. The feud went on intermittently through 2006.

Brown and The Outlaw, who had by now renamed himself "Kip James", defeated Konnan and Killings at No Surrender on July 17, 2005, with James declining to help either team. Konnan and Killings became increasingly frustrated, at one point referring to themselves as the "2Live Kru". The two teams faced one another in a No Surrender rematch on August 14, 2005, at Sacrifice, with James appointed guest referee by Director of Authority Larry Zbyszko, and James reaffirmed his loyalty to the Kru by attacking Kip, enabling Konnan to pin him and win the match. The Kru, apparently undivided, celebrated together following the match.

Over the following weeks, Kip James began assisting the 3 Live Kru, and on October 23, 2005, at Bound for Glory, he saved Konnan from a beating at the hands of Team Canada. On the November 26 episode of Impact!, B.G. James brought Kip James and the 3 Live Kru to ringside, then asked Killings and Konnan whether James could join the stable. Following a heated argument between the still skeptical Konnan and B.G., both Killings and Konnan gave their assent, and the 4 Live Kru was born. At Turning Point the 4 Live Kru faced Team Canada in an eight-man tag match. In the course of the match, Konnan attacked both B.G. and Kip James.

==== Latin American Xchange (2005–2007) ====
On the December 31, 2005, episode of Impact!, Konnan told B.G.'s father, Bob Armstrong, that he was a "hothead" and invited Armstrong to accompany him backstage for an apology. Instead of apologizing, Konnan turned heel by leading Armstrong into an ambush at the hands of Apolo and the debuting Homicide. The trio, later identified as The Latin American Xchange (LAX), then instructed an unconscious Armstrong to tell B.G. and Kip to "take care of their own business". At Final Resolution on January 15, 2006, Konnan and Homicide defeated The Naturals. After Apolo was released by TNA, he was replaced by Machete, who was in turn evicted from LAX by Konnan and Homicide. In subsequent weeks, Konnan began feuding with Bob Armstrong. On the April 8, 2006, episode of Impact!, Konnan faced Armstrong in an "Arm Wrestling Challenge"; the contest ended in a no-contest after LAX member Hernandez attacked Armstrong. At Lockdown on April 23, 2006, Konnan was defeated by Armstrong in an arm wrestling contest held within the confines of a steel cage; following the bout, each member of the LAX received ten lashes from the James Gang.

May 2006 was very busy for Konnan. In AAA, he made his first appearance with La Legión Extranjera (with Chessman and Ron Killings) on May 1, 2006, losing to El Zorro, Octagon and Vampiro Canadiense at AAA Sin Limite. He soon became the leader of the stable, which was active through 2009. That same month, Konnan became the TNA Impact! Spanish color commentator. Additionally, he and the LAX began a storyline that saw them refuse to wrestle (as well as himself and Moody Jack refuse to commentate), claiming that Latinos were discriminated against within TNA.

On June 24, 2006, Konnan participated in the first lucha libre event in San Diego. He stated that "Unfortunately there has never been lucha libre in the South Bay, there has never been lucha libre for la raza. Finally they will be able to see the lucha libre that they watch on television live here a few minutes from their home."

In early 2007, Konnan underwent hip replacement surgery, and his appearances in TNA from then on saw him frequently using a wheelchair. In June, Konnan left TNA, as did Ron Killings. Konnan gave several interviews about the drug abuse problem in pro wrestling around that time, most notably to the New York Daily News, which indicated that Konnan believed his "hip degenerated after years of steroid abuse and the physical toll of his sport, and...painkillers and anti-inflammatory drugs ruined [his] kidney." He would reiterate the issue on his podcast some years later He successfully underwent kidney transplant surgery on July 23, 2007.

==== Return to Impact Wrestling (2017–2019) ====
In March 2017, Konnan returned to Impact Wrestling as the manager of The Latin American Xchange (Homicide, Ortiz, Santana and Diamante). At Bound for Glory, The Latin American Xchange (Konnan, Santana and Ortiz) defeated The OGz (King, Hernandez and Homicide) in a Concrete Jungle Death match in Konnan's final match in TNA.

On January 23, 2019, it was revealed that Konnan would now be working as a member of the creative team for Impact Wrestling.

Konnan left Impact Wrestling in August 2019.

==== TNA Hall of Fame (2026) ====
Konnan was inducted into the TNA Hall of Fame in 2026 by his former LAX partner Cruz Montana (formerly Mike Santana), but he did not attend the ceremony due to ongoing severe health issues, including months of hospitalization and physical rehabilitation that left him unable to travel.

=== Return to AAA (2004–2006) ===
While with TNA, Konnan also returned to AAA (Asistencia, Asesoría y Administración de Espectáculos), making his first appearance at AAA Sin Limite - Guerra De Titanes 2004 on December 5, 2004. Konnan was teamed with Rikishi and lost to Cibernetico and La Parka by disqualification. From March 2005 onwards, Konnan was also feuding with Vampiro and La Parka in AAA. The feud went on intermittently through 2006. On May 1, 2006, he made his first appearance with La Legión Extranjera (with Chessman and Ron Killings), losing to El Zorro, Octagon and Vampiro Canadiense at AAA Sin Limite. He soon became the leader of the stable, which was active through 2009.

On June 24, 2006, Konnan participated in the first lucha libre event in San Diego. He stated that "Unfortunately there has never been lucha libre in the South Bay, there has never been lucha libre for la raza. Finally they will be able to see the lucha libre that they watch on television live here a few minutes from their home."

=== Second return to AAA and independent promotions (2007–2012) ===
Despite having left TNA in June 2007, Konnan did not wrestle for AAA until October, and only wrestled in four matches during the remainder of the year, due to his aforementioned surgeries. Konnan returned to World Wrestling Council at WWC Euphoria Tour 2008 on January 6, 2008, with Ron Killings of the 3 Live Kru, losing a tag team match against Eddy and Orlando Colon. In March 2008, Konnan sued TNA for racism and discrimination, alleging that while the company said that they would help pay for his hip replacement surgery, they did not. Konnan also claimed that TNA helped pay for Scott Steiner's operation, but did not pay for Ron Killings's surgery from around the same time.

On October 24, 2008, Konnan took part in an "Eight Man Domo De La Muerte Steel Cage Winner Gets Control Over AAA" match where La Legión Extranjera (consisting of Konnan, Electroshock, Kenzo Suzuki, and Rellik) defeated La Parka, Latin Lover, Octagon and Super Fly. On March 15, 2009, Konnan lost a Hair vs. Hair match against Vampiro Canadiense. He continued to wrestle with La Legión until February 2010.

On June 12, 2010, in a Four Way Elimination Match for the vacant AAA Parejas Increibles Tag Team Title, Cibernetico and Konnan defeated Dr. Wagner Jr. and Silver Cain, Electroshock and Super Fly, and LA Par-K and La Parka to become the champions. Konnan wrestled his last official match for AAA on October 1, 2010, a three-on-two Handicap Hardcore match pitting Joe Lider and Nicho el Millonario as La Hermandad Extrema against the threesome of Damian 666, Halloween and Konnan as La Sociedad. Konnan's team lost the match.

Konnan then made a series of appearances for independent promotions again, beginning with his only appearance as a performer for El Hijo de Perro Aguayo's promotion Perros del Mal on November 6, 2010. La Sociedad defeated Charlie Haas, Super Crazy and Tony Wilson at PDM The War at Auditorio Municipal Fausto Gutierrez Moreno in Tijuana, Baja California, Mexico.

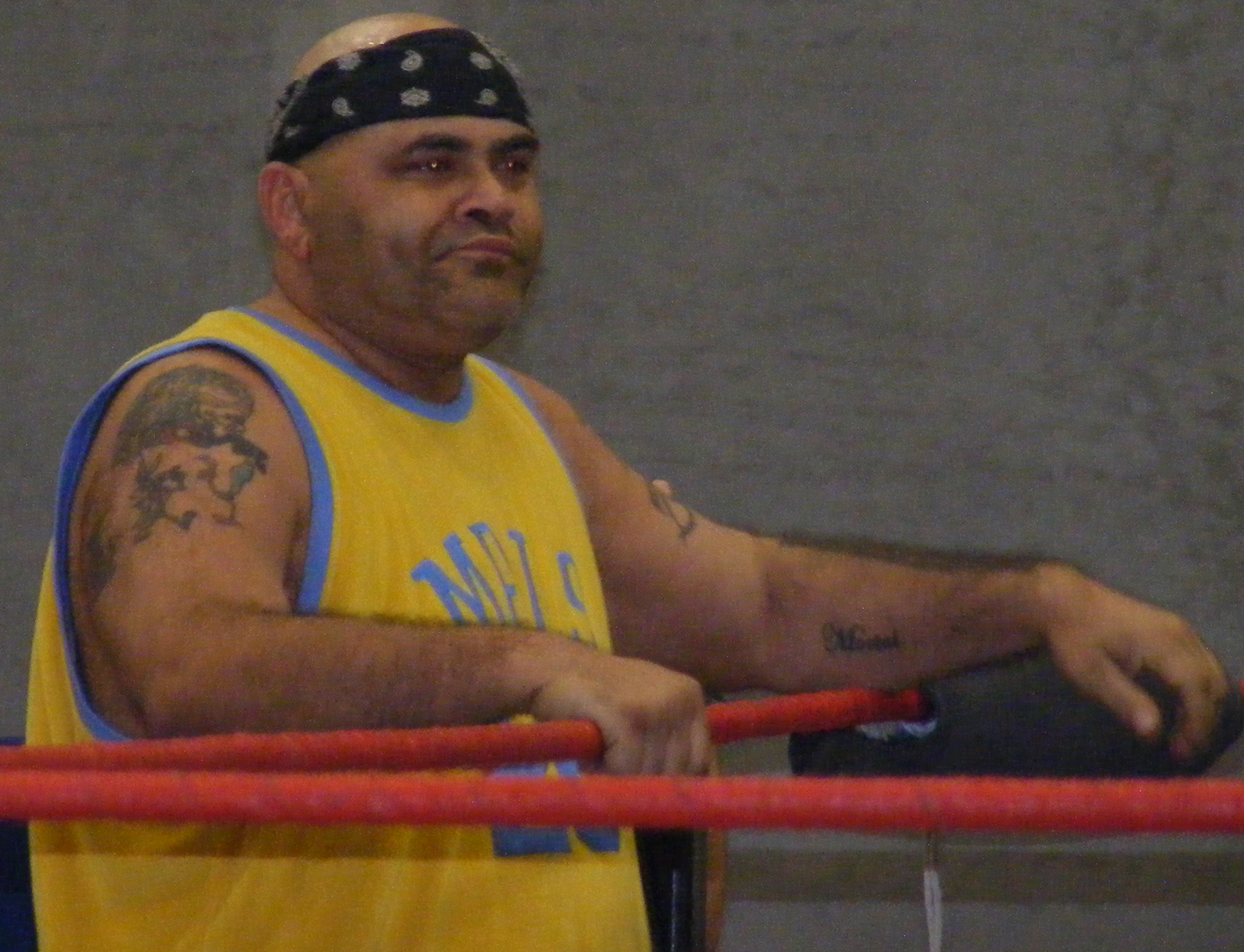
Konnan in July 2011

On July 3, 2011, Konnan, together with El Canek and El Rayo de Jalisco Jr, defeated Los Hermanos Dinamita (Cien Caras, Mascara Ano 2000, and Universo 2000) by disqualification at International Wrestling Revolution Group's Festival De Las Mascaras 2011 at Arena Naucalpan in Naucalpan de Juarez, Estado de Mexico, Mexico. He then took part in a Mixed Five-on-four Handicap Match on August 7, 2011, where the team of Dr. Wagner Jr., Electroshock, El Elegido and El Zorro defeated Konnan, Chessman, Jennifer Blake, Mini Psicosis and Nicho el Millonario as part of a telethon benefit show in Pachuca, Hidalgo, Mexico. On October 7, 2011, Konnan and Nicho el Millonario, wrestling as La Sociedad lost by DQ to El Mesias and Extreme Tiger in an event for Promociones MV held at the Auditorio Municipal Fausto Gutierrez Moreno in Tijuana, Baja California, Mexico.

At Pro Wrestling Superstars' WrestleReunion VI held at The Westin Los Angeles Airport in Los Angeles, California, on January 28, 2012, Konnan took part in a 20-man Battle Royal featuring Brutus Beefcake, Gangrel, Greg Valentine, and others. The match was eventually won by The Godfather. Konnan then defeated The Convict at High Impact Wrestling's HIW Summer Invasion 2012 at Treaty Grounds in La Loche, Saskatchewan, Canada on August 23, 2012.

=== Outside-the-ring roles (2013–present) ===
On February 3, 2013, Konnan was (in-storyline) fired from AAA. However, he returned to the promotion on April 15, announcing that he was once again becoming an in-ring performer. However, he instead moved on to other duties. He told Stephen Dean Johnson of SLAM! Wrestling that he is "kind of a jack-of-all-trades with Triple AAA. I write, produce, act as agent, and international liaison for talent. I am also on TV as one of the main managers for heels." In that same interview, he teased the then-upcoming deal that would lead to Lucha Underground. Konnan wrestled on September 15, 2013, in a six-man tag match. He, El Mariachi and Kafu defeated Derek Sanders, Oliver John and Vaquero Fantasma at an event taking place at the Santa Cruz County Fair in Watsonville, California.

In August 2014, Konnan had his left hip replaced. He was also very critical of WWE on Twitter regarding Alberto Del Rio's release from WWE for "unprofessional conduct regarding an alleged racist joke made by a WWE employee and a concurrent contract dispute involving Rey Mysterio where WWE extended Mysterio's contract without permission.

In September 2014, Konnan was announced as one of the AAA wrestlers to star in the El Rey network's new television series Lucha Underground. In the first season, he appeared as the manager of Prince Puma and claimed responsibility for bringing Fénix, Pentagón Jr. and Drago into the promotion.

On March 20, 2015, Konnan was ringside at a show organized by the independent promotion The Crash, in Tijuana, Mexico, when El Hijo del Perro Aguayo died in a freak accident during a match. He was named Crash' Head of creative until December 2017, when he was released.

In February 2016, Konnan stated that he had lost his creative position in AAA and was now merely a consultant for the promotion. He then levelled several accusations at AAA regarding non-payment of talent.

Konnan was named Head of Creative of Aro Lucha.

=== Third return to AAA (2018–present) ===
On June 4 in Verano de Escándalo, Konnan returned to the AAA helping Jeff Jarrett win the AAA Mega Championship against Rey Wagner and Rey Mysterio Jr. before being faced by Fénix. On July 14 in Querétaro, Konnan and his group MAD make their debut, but were interrupted by La Parka, starting a rivalry.

At Triplemanía XXVII, Konnan competed in the Fifteen-man Copa Triplemanía match which was won by Pagano.

During 2024, Konnan began to clash with Latin Lover, who had been appointed as an authority figure on-screen. At Triplemanía XXXII: Mexico City, after Alberto el Patrón turned villainous, Konnan aligned himself with Alberto and attacked Latin Lover.

Following the WWE's acquisition of AAA, Konnan was a commentator during the first joint event, WWE x AAA: Worlds Collide on June 7, 2025. In 2026, it was reported that Konnan had both his legs amputated due to diabetes complications.

=== Major League Wrestling (2018–2022) ===
Starting in 2018 Konnan began appearing in Major League Wrestling as a manager for Pentagon Jr. and Fenix, among other AAA wrestlers. He and his clients engaged in a feud with MLW World Heavyweight Champion Low Ki. On December 14, 2018, Konnan challenged Low Ki in a no-disqualification match for his championship, in a losing effort. The match was stopped by the referee when Low Ki, Ricky Martinez, and Hijo de L.A. Park would not stop attacking Konnan. Low Ki then "shanked" Konnan with some object, but Tom Lawlor ran out to make the save.At Battle Riot II, Konnan competed in the 39 Man Battle Riot II which was won by L. A. Park.

=== All Elite Wrestling (2020–2021) ===
On November 17, 2020, Konnan returned to TNT for the first time since 2001, when he appeared on an episode of AEW Dynamite. During his appearance, Konnan reunited with former LAX members Santana and Ortiz, both of whom were members of Chris Jericho's wrestling stable Inner Circle. The reunion occurred during an Inner Circle party in Las Vegas. Konnan later appeared at AEW's marquee event Double or Nothing on May 30, 2021. During the main event match, which was a Stadium Stampede match that involved The Inner Circle, Konnan had a cameo appearance as a DJ inside a club in the TIAA Bank Field stadium, briefly assisting Santana and Ortiz. Konnan appeared on the June 26 edition of Dynamite, being supportive of Santana and Ortiz until attacked by their rivals FTR at the behest of Tully Blanchard.

== Other media ==
Konnan has appeared in the video game WCW Nitro, WCW/nWo Revenge, WCW/nWo Thunder, WCW Mayhem, WCW Backstage Assault, Lucha Libre AAA: Héroes del Ring.

Konnan had a weekly podcast on MLW Radio which moved to The Jericho Network in July 2016. Konnan became the "first new voice" on the podcast network, which was started by Chris Jericho. The podcast, Keeping it 100 with Konnan is co-hosted by Glenn Gilberti. Konnan also made an appearance at San Diego Comic-Con.

Konnan made an appearance at 2023 WWE Hall of Fame, inducting Rey Mysterio.

== Personal life ==
In March 2026, it was reported that Ashenoff was hospitalized in a "delicate state of health" and underwent a leg amputation. In June of that same year, Vince Russo revealed that Ashenoff had received a double leg amputation and WWE covered his medical expenses.

== Championships and accomplishments ==
- Asistencia Asesoría y Administración
  - AAA Americas Heavyweight Championship (2 times)
  - AAA Parejas Increibles Tag Team Championship (1 time) – with Cibernético
  - IWC World Heavyweight Championship (1 time)
  - AAA Hall of Fame (2025)
- Cauliflower Alley Club
  - Lucha Libre Award (2022)
- Championship Wrestling USA Northwest
  - Championship Wrestling USA Northwest Tag Championship (1 time) – with Beetlejuice
- Consejo Mundial de Lucha Libre
  - CMLL World Heavyweight Championship (1 time)
- International Wrestling All-Stars
  - IWAS World Heavyweight Championship (1 time)
  - IWAS World Tag Team Championship (1 time) – with Rey Mysterio, Jr.
- Latin American Wrestling Association
  - LAWA Heavyweight Championship (2 times)
- Global Championship Wrestling
  - GCW Heavyweight Championship (1 time)
- Pro Wrestling Illustrated
  - Ranked No. 25 of the top 500 singles wrestlers in the PWI 500 in 1996
  - Ranked No. 131 of the top 500 singles wrestlers of the "PWI Years" in 2003
- Total Nonstop Action Wrestling
  - NWA World Tag Team Championship (2 times) – with B.G. James and Ron Killings (Note: Konnan defended the title with either James or Killings under the Freebird Rule during their first reign.)
  - TNA Hall of Fame (Class of 2026)
- World Championship Wrestling
  - WCW World Television Championship (1 time)
  - WCW United States Heavyweight Championship (1 time)
  - WCW World Tag Team Championship (2 times) – with Rey Mysterio, Jr. (1) and Billy Kidman (1)
- World Wrestling Council
  - WWC Universal Heavyweight Championship (1 time)
  - WWC World Tag Team Championship (1 time) – with Carly Colón
  - WWC Caribbean Heavyweight Championship (1 time)
- Wrestling Observer Newsletter
  - Wrestling Observer Newsletter Hall of Fame (Class of 2009)

== Luchas de apuestas record ==
Winner (wager)	Loser (wager)	Location	Event	Date	Notes
Konnan (mask)	Red Killer (mask)	N/A	Live event	N/A	
Konnan (mask)	Junior Killer (mask)	N/AN/A	Live event	N/A	
Konnan (mask) and Unknown (hair)	Red Killer (hair) and Junior Killer (hair)	Monterrey, Nuevo León	Live event	Unknown	
Konnan (mask)	As Charro (hair)	Tijuana, Baja California	Live event	February 24, 1989	
Perro Aguayo (hair)	Konnan (mask)	Mexico City	Live event	March 22, 1991	
Konnan (hair)	Perro Aguayo (hair)	Mexico City	EMLL 58th Anniversary Show	September 6, 1991	(Note: This was a triangle match that also included Cien Caras.)
Konnan (hair)	El Cobarde II (hair)	Los Angeles, California	Live event	July 4, 1992	
Konnan (hair)	Rey Gestas (hair)	Apatlaco, Mexico State	Live event	August 15, 1992	
Cien Caras (Carrera)	Konnan (carrera)	Ciudad de México	Triplemanía I	April 30, 1993	23
Konnan (hair)	Jake Roberts (hair)	Tijuana, Baja California	Triplemanía II-C	May 27, 1994	
Konnan (hair)	Cien Caras (hair)	Los Angeles, California	Live event	July 15, 1995	(Note: This was a triangle Steel cage match that also included Perro Aguayo.)
Konnan (Kidman's hair)	Mike Awesome (hair)	Fort Wayne, Indiana	Live event	January 15, 2001	
Vampiro Canadienese (hair of Joaquin Roldan)	Konnan (hair of Arturo Rivera)	Guadalajara, Jalisco	Rey de Reyes	March 15, 2009	
