= Rise of the Renegades (2022) =

Professional wrestling event

- Promotion: Major League Wrestling
- Date: June 9, 2022
- City: Dallas, Texas
- Venue: Gilley's Dallas

Rise of the Renegades chronology
← Previous; 2019	Next → —

MLW Fusion special episodes chronology
← Previous; Intimidation Games	Next → Kings of Colosseum

Rise of the Renegades (2022) was a special episode of MLW Fusion that aired on June 9, 2022. Though it shares the same name as the reoccurring Rise of the Renegades professional wrestling event produced by Major League Wrestling (MLW), the matches featured on the program were taped as part of the Azteca Underground event held at Gilley's Dallas in Dallas, Texas on April 1, 2022.

Three professional wrestling matches were contested on the card. The main event was a six-man tag team match, in which King Muertes, Mads Krügger and Richard Holliday defeated The Von Hammers (Alexander Hammerstone, Marshall Von Erich and Ross Von Erich). On the undercard, Octagón Jr. defeated Matt Cross to retain the Caribbean Heavyweight Championship and Gino Medina defeated Aramis in a Mexican Strap match.

== Production ==
=== Background ===
Other on-screen personnel
Role:	Name:
Commentators	Joe Dombrowski
Commentators	Rich Bocchini

On April 1, 2022, MLW held Azteca Underground at the Gilley's Dallas in Dallas, Texas, a television taping for MLW Fusion. On June 3, MLW announced on Twitter that a special episode of Fusion would air on June 9 titled Rise of the Renegades, a name previously used for television taping events. On June 3, MLW revealed the line up of matches taped from Azteca Underground to air as part on the special.

=== Storylines ===
Rise of the Renegades consisted of matches that resulted from scripted storylines, where wrestlers portrayed villains, heroes, or less distinguishable characters in scripted events that built tension and culminated in a wrestling match or series of matches, with results predetermined by MLW's writers. Storylines were played out on MLW's weekly series, Fusion.

== Event ==
=== Preliminary matches ===
The event kicked off with a Mexican Strap match between Aramis and Gino Medina. After interference by various lumberjacks, Medina pinned Aramis with a victory roll by grabbing Aramis' tights for the win. Aramis attacked Medina after the match and Medina hit a low blow to Aramis and removed his mask until Matt Cross made the save by covering Aramis' face with a towel.

Next, Octagón Jr. defended the Caribbean Heavyweight Championship against Matt Cross. After avoiding a shooting star press by Cross, Octagón nailed a package piledriver to Cross to retain the title.

The event featured various backstage segments involving the BOMAYE Fight Club, KC Navarro, Myron Reed, Taya Valkyrie, Lince Dorado, Strange Sangre, Holidead, Microman and Cesar Duran. It also promoted the return of Killer Kross to MLW after a three-month absence along with the debuting Scarlett Bordeaux.

=== Main event match ===
In the main event, The Von Hammers (Alexander Hammerstone, Marshall Von Erich, and Ross Von Erich) took on King Muertes, Mads Krügger, and Richard Holliday. Alicia Atout handed over her heel to Holliday and distracted the referee, allowing Holliday to hit Hammerstone with the heel and deliver a 2008 to Hammerstone for the win.

== Aftermath ==
The confrontation of Strange Sangre against Taya Valkyrie, Microman and Lince Dorado at Rise of the Renegades led to a six-person tag team match between the two teams on the June 23 episode of Fusion.

Alexander Hammerstone and Richard Holliday continued their feud, leading to a match between the two for Hammerstone's MLW World Heavyweight Championship at Kings of Colosseum.

== Results ==
No.	Results	Stipulations	Times
1	Gino Medina defeated Aramis	Mexican Strap match	5:37
2	Octagón Jr. (c) defeated Matt Cross	Singles match for the MLW Caribbean Heavyweight Championship	9:01
3	King Muertes, Mads Krügger, and Richard Holliday (with Alicia Atout) defeated The Von Hammers (Alexander Hammerstone, Marshall Von Erich, and Ross Von Erich)	Six-man tag team match	9:31
(c) / – the champion(s) heading into the match
