= WWA Light Heavyweight Championship =

Professional wrestling championship

WWA World Light Heavyweight Championship (Campeonato Mundial peso Semi Completo de WWA)
- The championship belt

Details
- Promotion: World Wrestling Association (WWA)
- Date established: 1987
- Current champion: Atlantis
- Date won: December 5, 2014
Statistics
- First champion: El Cobarde II
- Most reigns: Lizmark (3 Reigns)

The WWA World Light Heavyweight Championship (Campeonato Mundial peso Semi Completo de WWA in Spanish) is a singles professional wrestling championship promoted by World Wrestling Association (WWA) in Mexico since 1987. The official definition of the Light Heavyweight weight class in Mexico is between 92 kg (203 lb) and 97 kg (214 lb), but is not always strictly enforced. (Note: The most recent case of this is Mephisto's holding the CMLL World Welterweight Championship, a belt with a 78 kg (172 lb) upper limit despite weighing 90 kg (200 lb).)

As it was a professional wrestling championship, the championship was not won not by actual competition, but by a scripted ending to a match determined by the bookers and match makers. (Note: Hornbaker (2016) p. 550: "Professional wrestling is a sport in which match finishes are predetermined. Thus, win–loss records are not indicative of a wrestler's genuine success based on their legitimate abilities – but on now much, or how little they were pushed by promoters") On occasion the promotion declares a championship vacant, which means there is no champion at that point in time. This can either be due to a storyline, (Note: Duncan & Will (2000) p. 271, Chapter: Texas: NWA American Tag Team Title [World Class, Adkisson] "Championship held up and rematch ordered because of the interference of manager Gary Hart") or real life issues such as a champion suffering an injury being unable to defend the championship, (Note: Duncan & Will (2000) p. 20, Chapter: (United States: 19th Century & widely defended titles – NWA, WWF, AWA, IW, ECW, NWA) NWA/WCW TV Title "Rhodes stripped on 85/10/19 for not defending the belt after having his leg broken by Ric Flair and Ole & Arn Anderson") or leaving the company. (Note: Duncan & Will (2000) p. 201, Chapter: (Memphis, Nashville) Memphis: USWA Tag Team Title "Vacant on 93/01/18 when Spike leaves the USWA.")

It was first won by El Cobarde II in 1987 and has since then been held by at least 9 wrestlers, although records for parts of the title history has not been found. The current champion is Atlantis, who won it in December 2014. Since the WWA titles have been largely unsanctioned since the late 1990s it means that they can be defended on any wrestling show, not just limited to WWA promoted shows. (Note: Duncan & Will (2000) pp. 399–400, Chapter: "Mexico: World Wrestling Association (Benjamin Mora) WWA Light Heavyweight Title")

== Title history ==
Key
No.	Overall reign number
Reign	Reign number for the specific champion
Days	Number of days held
N/A	Unknown information
†	Championship change is unrecognized by the promotion

No.	Champion	Championship change			Reign statistics		Notes	Ref.
No.	Champion	Date	Event	Location	Reign	Days	Notes	Ref.
1	El Cobarde II	1987	Live event	N/A	1		Records are not clear on who El Cobarde defeated to win the championship	
2	Lizmark	April 1, 1988	Live event	Tijuana, Mexico	1			
—		N/A	—	—				
3	Enrique Vera		Live event	N/A	1			
4	Lizmark	June 1990	Live event	(Note: The location of the title change has not been captured.)	2	(Note: The exact date on which Lizmark won and lost the championship is unknown, placing his title reign between 1,128 and 1,187 days.)		
5	La Parka	August 1993	Live event		1	(Note: The exact date on which La Parka won and lost the title is unknown, placing his title reign between 1,097 and 151 days.)		
6	Lizmark	September 1993	Live event		3	(Note: The exact date on which Lizmark won the title is unknown, placing his title reign between 172 and 292 days.)		
7	La Parka	June 20, 1994	Live event	Monterrey, Mexico	2			(Note: Rey Misterio Jr. & Juventud Guerrera wrestled for the belt several times in 1995)
—		N/A	—	—				
8	El Dandy	January 2001	Live event	Nuevo Laredo, Mexico	1	(Note: The exact date on which El Dandy won the title is unknown, placing his title reign between 2 and 167 days.)		
9	Asterisco	June 17, 2001	Live event	Reynosa, Mexico	1			
—		N/A	—	—				
10	Kiss	January 17, 2003	Live event	Tijuana, Mexico	1		Defeated Rey Misterio Sr. to win the vacant title.	
—		N/A	—	—				
11	Blue Demon Jr.	March 2008	Live event	Oaxaca, Oaxaca	1	(Note: The exact date on which Blue Demon Jr. winning the title is unknown, which means that his title reign has lasted at least 6,756 days.)	Won the vacant title in a one-night tournament.	
—	Vacated	N/A	—	—	—	—	Championship vacated due to inactivity.	
12	Heddi Karaoui	November 30, 2013	Live event	Mexico City	1		Won the vacant title against Negro Navarro.	
—	Vacated	N/A	—	—	—	—		
13	Atlantis	December 5, 2014	Live event	Tijuana	1	4,316+	Won the vacant title against Negro Casas.	

== See also ==
- NWA World Junior Heavyweight Championship, predecessor in Jim Crockett Promotions
- WCW Light Heavyweight Championship
- WWE Cruiserweight Championship (1996–2007)
- NXT Cruiserweight Championship
- WWF Light Heavyweight Championship
