= Alfonso Morales (journalist) =

Mexican sports journalist (1949–2020)

- Born: February 4, 1949; Huetamo, Michoacán, Mexico
- Died: December 17, 2020 (aged 71); Mexico City, Mexico
- Other name: El Dr. Alfonso Morales
- Occupation: Sports commentator
- Employer(s): CMLL, AAA, Televisa, TUDN
- Height: 1.89 m (6 ft 2 in)

Gilberto Alfonso Morales Villela (February 4, 1949 – December 17, 2020), better known as Doctor Alfonso Morales, was a journalist and sports commentator, recognized for his work in Mexican professional wrestling and boxing. He worked for Televisa, CMLL, AAA, and the TUDN. Due to his 40 years of experience in professional wrestling, he was honored by Televisa at Arena Coliseo and inducted into the AAA Hall of Fame in 2018.

== Career ==
Alfonso Morales studied medicine and psychiatry at National Autonomous University of Mexico, from which he graduated. Due to this, he was often referred to as Doctor Alfonso Morales in the media.

His career began at Canal 11 in the 1980s, when he was "accidentally" sent to cover a boxing match between Carlos Palomino and Wilfredo Benítez, after which he focused on boxing and professional wrestling, according to his own words. During his career as a sports commentator, he had relationships with wrestlers such as El Cavernario Galindo, El Santo, and Blue Demon.

In 1980, he joined Televisa, where he focused on professional wrestling. During the 1990s, Alfonso Morales shared commentary duties with Arturo Rivera, covering wrestling events in the Consejo Mundial de la Lucha Libre and AAA. However, after the television network stopped broadcasting wrestling, the Mexican commentator was no longer on television. From 2016, he was no longer affiliated with the San Ángel broadcaster. He was inducted into the Lucha Libre AAA Worldwide Hall of Fame in 2018. In 2019, the Government of Michoacán awarded him recognition for his distinguished career in journalism and communication.

== Relationship with Tinieblas ==
During his career as a sports commentator, a rumor spread that Alfonso Morales and the wrestler Tinieblas were the same person, as his fellow commentators mentioned that when they were at events where Tinieblas wrestled, Alfonso would disappear.

Both personas fueled this belief; on one occasion, Morales intentionally dropped a Tinieblas mask that the wrestler had given him. Due to this situation, many began to claim that they were the same person, although he always denied it. At the same time, Tinieblas also perpetuated the myth by posing with medical gowns and instruments, alluding to the other profession that Alfonso Morales practiced.

== Awards and accomplishments ==
- Asistencia Asesoría y Administración
  - AAA Hall of Fame (2018)
- Wrestling Observer Newsletter
  - Wrestling Observer Newsletter Hall of Fame (Class of 2012)
