= IWC World Heavyweight Championship =

Professional wrestling championship

Details
- Promotion: International Wrestling Council (1993-1995); Consejo Mundial de Lucha Libre (1995-1996); Promotora Mexicana de Lucha Libre (1996); Promo Azteca (1996-1998); Mexican Independent circuit / Lucha Libre AAA World Wide (1998-2007); International Wrestling Revolution Group (1999)
- Date established: November 13, 1993
Statistics
- First champion: Cien Caras
- Most reigns: Pirata Morgan (3 reigns)
- Longest reign: Cibernético (2554 days)
- Shortest reign: Héctor Garza (7 days)
- Oldest champion: Perro Aguayo (48 years and 299 days)
- Youngest champion: Cibernético (25 years and 128 days)
- Heaviest champion: Máscara Sagrada 115 kg (253 lb)
- Lightest champion: Héctor Garza 95 kg (209 lb)

The International Wrestling Council (IWC) World Heavyweight Championship (Campeonato Mundial de Peso Completo de la IWC in Spanish) was a professional wrestling world heavyweight championship in the Mexican professional wrestling promotion, Lucha Libre AAA Worldwide (AAA). The championship existed from 1993 until 2007, when it was unified with the GPCW SUPER-X Monster Championship, Mexican National Heavyweight Championship and UWA World Light Heavyweight Championship to create the AAA Mega Championship. The championship was generally contested in professional wrestling matches, in which participants execute scripted finishes rather than contend in direct competition.

== History ==
The IWC World Heavyweight Championship was created by Ron Skoler to promote the shows of AAA in the United States. In 1995, AAA and the IWC ended their partnership, and AAA founder Antonio Peña took control of and continued promoting the championship. In late of 1999, Pirata Morgan came to AAA from the International Wrestling Revolution Group (IWRG) and took with him the IWRG Intercontinental Heavyweight Championship. Morgan began to be promoted as IWC World Heavyweight Champion and the previous champion, L.A. Park began to defend the title as the "IWC World Hardcore Champion".

== Reigns ==
The inaugural champion was Cien Caras, who defeated Konnan at Live Event on November 13, 1993 in San Jose, California. The longest reigning champion was Cibernético who held the title for 2554 days from August 18, 2000 to August 16, 2007. The youngest champion is Cibernético who won at the age of 25 years and 128 days. The shortest reigning champion was Héctor Garza who held the title for 7 days from August 11, 2000 to August 18, 2000. Pirata Morgan has held the title the most times with 3 championship reigns. The oldest champion is Perro Aguayo who won at the age of 48 years and 299 days.

== Title history ==
Key
No.	Overall reign number
Reign	Reign number for the specific champion
Days	Number of days held

No.	Champion	Championship change			Reign statistics		Notes	Ref.
No.	Champion	Date	Event	Location	Reign	Days	Notes	Ref.
International Wrestling Council (IWC)
1	Cien Caras	November 13, 1993	Live event	San Jose, California	1	140	Cien Caras defeated Konnan to become the inaugural champion.	
2	Konnan	April 2, 1994	Live event	Reynosa, Tamaulipas	1	225		
3	Perro Aguayo	November 13, 1994	Live event	Juárez, Chihuahua	1	179		
Consejo Mundial de Lucha Libre (CMLL)
4	Máscara Año 2000	May 11, 1995	Live event	Xalapa, Veracruz	1	646		
Promotora Mexicana de Lucha Libre (PMLL) and Promo Azteca (PA)
5	Máscara Sagrada	February 15, 1997	Live event	Cancún, Mexico	1	301		
6	Pirata Morgan	December 13, 1997	Live event	Nezahualcóyotl, State of Mexico	1	244		
Mexican Independent circuit and Lucha Libre AAA World Wide (AAA)
7	L.A. Park	August 14, 1998	Live event	Cuernavaca, Morelos	1	399		
International Wrestling Revolution Group (IWRG)
—	Vacated	September 17, 1999	—	—	—	—	Pirata Morgan arrived in AAA and defended the IWRG Intercontinental Heavyweight Championship as the IWC World Heavyweight Championship. L.A. Park began to defend his title as "IWC World Hardcore Championship".	
8	Pirata Morgan	September 17, 1999	Live event	Cuernavaca, Morelos	2	100	Pirata Morgan was awarded the championship when he arrived in AAA.	
9	Héctor Garza	December 26, 1999	Live event	Monterrey, Nuevo León	1	98		
10	Pirata Morgan	April 2, 2000	Live event	Querétaro, Querétaro	3	131		
11	Héctor Garza	August 11, 2000	Live event	Tijuana, Baja California	2	7		
12	Cibernético	August 18, 2000	Live event	Querétaro, Querétaro	1	2,554		
13	El Mesías	August 16, 2007	Live event	Toluca, State of Mexico	1	31		
—	Unified	September 16, 2007	—	—	—	—	Unified with three other titles to create the AAA Mega Championship.	

== List of combined reigns ==
Rank	Wrestler	No. of reigns	Combined days
1	Cibernético	1	2,554
2	Máscara Año 2000	1	646
3	Pirata Morgan	3	475
4	L.A. Park	1	399
5	Máscara Sagrada	1	301
6	Konnan	1	225
7	Perro Aguayo	1	179
8	Cien Caras	1	140
9	Héctor Garza	2	105
10	El Mesías	1	31
