= L. A. Park =

Mexican professional wrestler

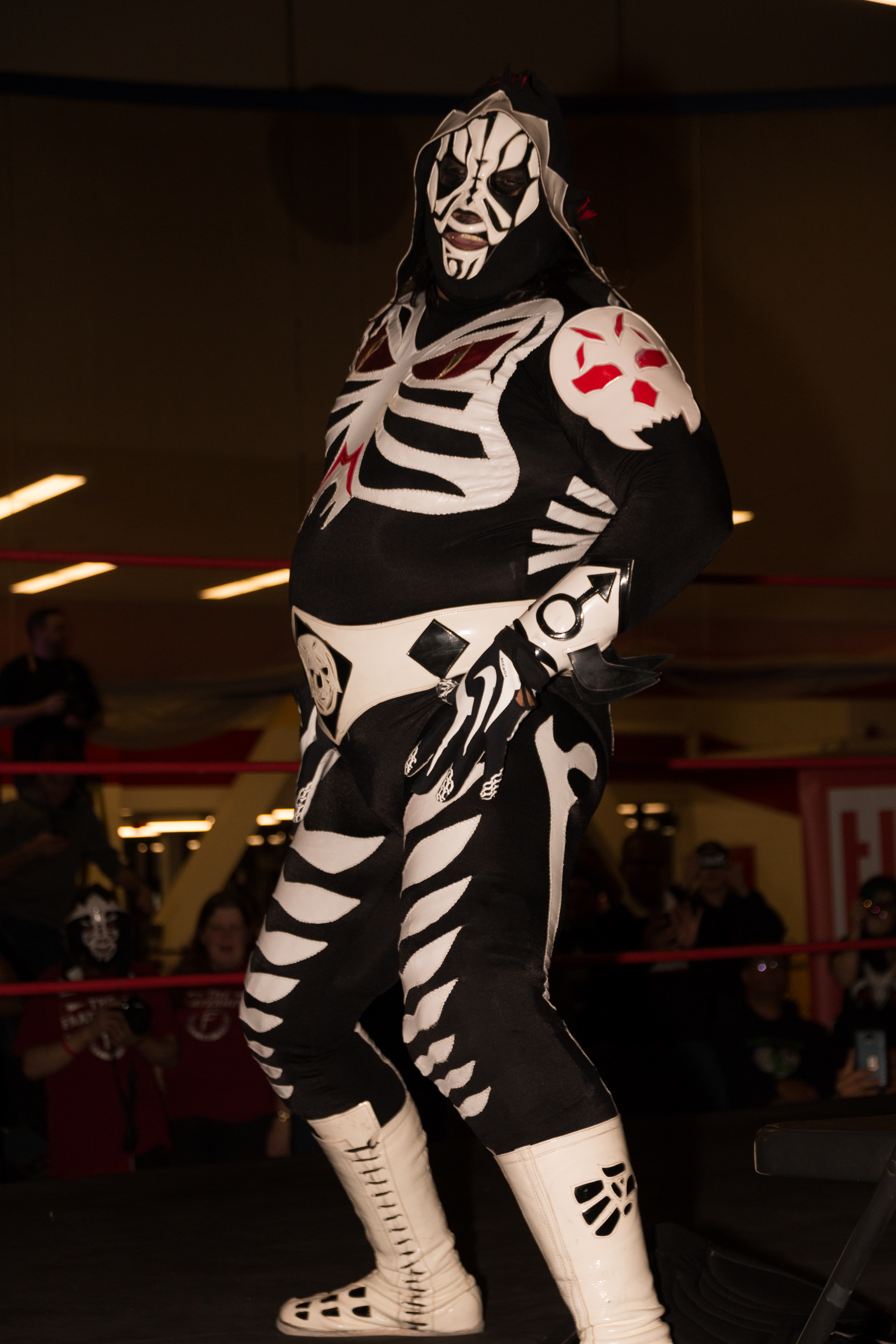
- Park in 2016

Personal information
- Born: Adolfo Margarito Tapia Ibarra; November 14, 1965 (age 60) Santiago de Querétaro, Querétaro, Mexico
- Children: El Hijo de L.A. Park (son); L.A. Park Jr. (son) (Note: It has not been verified if L.A. Park Jr. is someone who paid to use the name or actually a son of Adolfo Tapia.)
- Relatives: El Hijo de Cien Caras (brother); Super Parka (uncle); Johnny Ibara (uncle); Desalmado (uncle); Volador Jr. (nephew); Flyer (great nephew)

Professional wrestling career
- Ring names: Adolfo Tapia; El Gringo; El Minero; El Asesino de Tepito; Principe Island; Invasor del Norte I; La Parka; L.A. Park; L.A. Par-K
- Billed height: 6 ft 1 in (185 cm)
- Billed weight: 275 lb (125 kg)
- Billed from: Monclova, Coahuila, Mexico
- Trained by: Raul Reyes; Alberto Mora
- Debut: 1982

Adolfo Margarito Tapia Ibarra (November 14, 1965) is a Mexican professional wrestler, who currently performs as L. A. Park. He is best known throughout the world as the original La Parka, especially from his many years in the American World Championship Wrestling promotion. He has worked for every major and multiple minor wrestling promotions in Mexico, as well as participating on multiple wrestling tours in Japan. He is a three-time world heavyweight champion, having held the IWC World Heavyweight, IWC World Hardcore, and IWL World Heavyweight championships all once. He is also a two-time world tag team champion, having held the MLW World Tag Team Championship and the CMLL World Tag Team Championship each once.

Tapia was forced to change his ring name from "La Parka" to "L.A. Park" (short for La Auténtica Park; "The Original Park") in early 2003 when AAA owner Antonio Peña asserted his copyright claims to the La Parka character, barring Tapia from using the name as he promoted his own version of the gimmick with this new wrestler also being known as La Parka.

In March 2010, L.A. Park returned to AAA and started a storyline with AAA's La Parka, pitting the original and the new La Parka against each other. At Triplemanía XVIII, Park defeated La Parka and earned the rights to once again be known as "La Parka". The result, however, was later thrown out.

Tapia's uncle changed his character to Super Parka after Tapia gained worldwide fame. Several of Tapia's other family members are or have been professional wrestlers, including his sons El Hijo de L.A. Park and L.A. Park Jr., brother El Hijo de Cien Caras, nephew Volador Jr., and great nephew Flyer, among others. L.A. Park's family is referred to in Mexico as La Familia Real.

== Professional wrestling career ==
=== Early career (1982–1992) ===
Adolfo Tapia made his professional wrestling debut in 1982 at the age of 16, using his real name. Later on he would wrestle as the masked El Gringo in the Monclova, Coahuila region and as El Minero in Mexico City. Tapia lost his first Lucha de Apuesta, or bet match, to Climax II and was forced to take off the El Minero mask and reveal his real name, as per lucha libre (the professional wrestling style originary from Mexico) traditions. In 1988 he changed his ring character to El Asesino de Tepito ("The Assassin from Tepito"), a rudo (villain) character he used in 1988. He lost the Asesino de Tepito mask in an Apuesta match against Astro de Oro at some point in 1988. Following the mask loss Tapia adopted a character called Principe Island ("Island Prince"), a character he would use until 1992. As Principe Island he won the masks of wrestlers Gran Cóndor, Principe Judas, Guerrero Negra and Bestia Negra I. On November 21, 1987, he lost the Principe Island mask to El Hijo del Santo. Following his mask loss he started working as the masked Invasor del Norte I as well as still taking bookings as Principe Island. The double bookings came to an end on June 26, 1991, when Stuka unmasked the Invasor del Norte character, revealing that Tapia played both characters.

=== Asistencia Asesoría y Administración (1992–1996) ===
In 1992 Antonio Peña founded a new wrestling promotion called Asistencia Asesoría y Administración (AAA), signing Tapia to a contract early on. Peña came up with the idea to repackage Tapia as "La Parka" (an altered spelling of La Parca, Spanish for "The Reaper"), a character who wore a full bodysuit and mask that resembled a skeleton like the ones used in Mexico's Day of the Dead ceremonies. The character was an almost instant success with the fans, the imagery combined with Tapia's charisma and flamboyant actions in the ring made him a big crowd favorite despite La Parka initially being a rudo character. One of his initial storyline feuds was with Lizmark, a feud that resulted in a match for the Mexican National Light Heavyweight Championship at AAA's inaugural Triplemanía event, in which Lizmark successfully defended the title against La Parka. In August 1993 La Parka won his first championship when he defeated Lizmark for the WWA Light Heavyweight Championship on a WWA/AAA co-promoted show. The title reign lasted until October 23, 1993, when Lizmark won the title back. The feud between the two saw La Parka defeat Lizmark for the WWA title for a second time on June 20, 1994. La Parka was one of the wrestlers that worked the When Worlds Collide show, a joint AAA/World Championship Wrestling (WCW) pay-per-view where he teamed with Jerry Estrada and Blue Panther, losing to the team of The Pegasus Kid, 2 Cold Scorpio, and Tito Santana. On September 9, 1994, La Parka won the Mexican National Light Heavyweight Championship that he had been chasing for over a year when he defeated Lizmark for the title, finishing off the storyline between the two. La Parka held the title for 200 days losing it to Jerry Estrada. La Parka would wear the Mexican National Light Heavyweight championship two further times while working for AAA, in 1995 and in 1996 until he lost the belt to Pimpinela Escarlata on May 13, 1996.

=== Extreme Championship Wrestling (1995) ===
In 1995 he would make an appearance for Extreme Championship Wrestling (ECW) in the United States, teaming with Psicosis, losing a tag team match against Konnan and Rey Misterio Jr..

=== World Championship Wrestling (1996–2000) ===
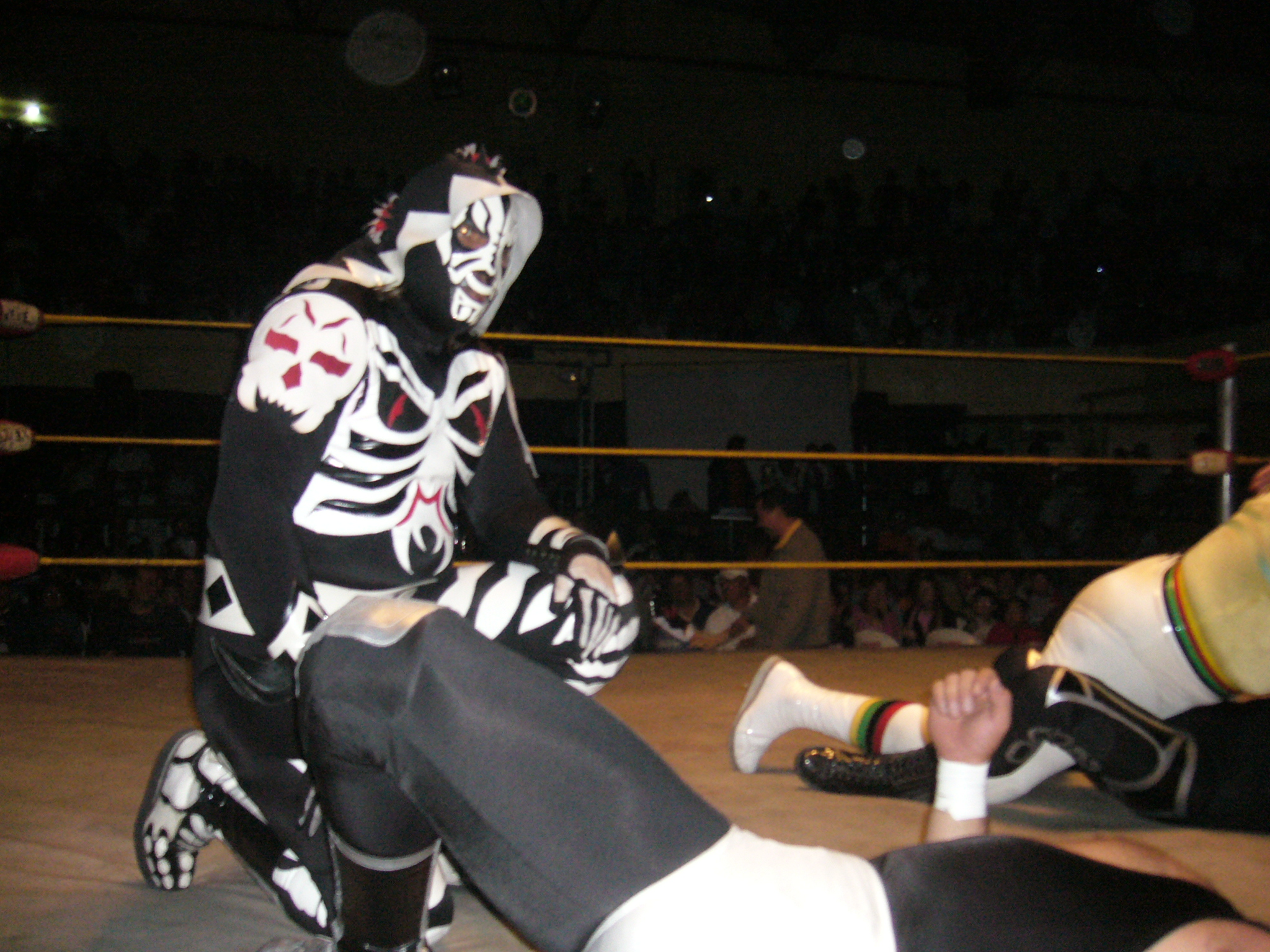
La Parka in action

When WCW began using a number of AAA wrestlers for their cruiserweight division in mid to late 1996, La Parka gained worldwide exposure by appearing on WCW's weekly television shows and PPVs. La Parka often wrestled against other AAA Luchadors such as Juventud Guerrera or Super Caló and often teamed with Psicosis (known in WCW as Psychosis). Due to La Parka's more comedic style he stood out from the rest of the AAA wrestlers who were generally high fliers. He was nicknamed "the chairman of WCW" due to the fact that he often carried a chair to the ring, played air guitar on it during his entrances and generally used it both in matches and in post match celebrations. At one point he and Psychosis were managed by Sonny Onoo, although the team failed to achieve much success as a unit. He later dropped Onoo as a manager and begin to feud with Psychosis and Disco Inferno. While La Parka often wrestled on WCW's Monday Nitro show his PPV appearances were rare. On July 13, he teamed with Psychosis and Villano IV on the undercard of WCW's Bash at the Beach PPV, losing to Héctor Garza, Juventud Guerrera and Lizmark Jr. He also wrestled at SuperBrawl VIII, losing to Disco Inferno.

La Parka's biggest achievement in WCW did not even involve Adolfo Tapia. One night in a match against Randy Savage, La Parka suddenly executed Diamond Dallas Page's finisher, the Diamond Cutter on Savage and gained the pinfall. After the match "La Parka" unmasked to show that it was in fact Page under the mask, using the ruse to get back at Savage during their rivalry. A couple of weeks later, Savage wrestled against the real La Parka, defeating him to gain a small measure of revenge.

In October 1998, La Parka became part of Eddie Guerrero's Latino World Order (LWO), a group that also included Psychosis, Juventud Guerrera, Villano IV, Villano V, El Dandy, Silver King, Héctor Garza, Damián 666, and a reluctant Rey Mysterio Jr. The group feuded mainly with Konnan and Perry Saturn. In January 1999, Guerrero was injured in a car accident and the LWO group was subsequently abandoned.

When Vince Russo and Ed Ferrara took over the creative portion of WCW in late 1999, the duo had Ferrara's voice dub English over the intercom while La Parka would be doing interviews in Spanish. This often ended with a confused Gene Okerlund exclaiming "What the hell was that?!" Among other things the voice-over explained that La Parka was a fan of Skeletor from Masters of the Universe and other comedic comments. During this time, he teamed with Kaz Hayashi, a Japanese wrestler who also used a "comedic voice over" gimmick and referred to La Parka as "Skull Captain". La Parka left WCW in March 2000 before WCW was bought by WWF a year later.

=== A second La Parka (1996–2003) ===
After the start of La Parka's WCW run in 1996, AAA debuted a new wrestler, La Parka Jr., who used the same costume. Adolfo Tapia mainly worked for US independent promotions and smaller Mexican promotions during that time, so his continued use of the gimmick did not draw objections. This changed when Tapia signed with AAA's main rival, Consejo Mundial de Lucha Libre, in 2003. AAA owner Antonio Peña responded by renaming La Parka Jr. and taking legal action to forbid Tapia from performing under the ring name "La Parka" or wearing the character's black-and-white suit. Tapia responded by counter-suing Peña and making changes to his gimmick, including using the ring name "L.A. ParK", short for "La Autentica ParK" (pronounced "Par-Ka"); a new mask design inspired by the Star Wars character Darth Maul; and new multicolored ring gear. Tapia eventually returned to wearing his black and white bodysuit.

=== Consejo Mundial de Lucha Libre (2003–2008) ===
In 2003 L.A. ParK began working for CMLL, although he was often kept off their television broadcasts due to the ongoing legal battles with Peña and AAA. In January 2004 L.A. Park teamed up with Shocker to defeat Los Guerreros del Infierno (Último Guerrero and Rey Bucanero) to win the CMLL World Tag Team Championship. Guerrero and Bucanero regained the titles 56 days later, after which L.A. Park challenged Último Guerrero to defend the CMLL World Light Heavyweight Championship against him at CMLL's 71st Anniversary Show, a match which L.A. Park lost two falls to one.

Tapia worked for CMLL in an on-again, off-again capacity, not being booked for CMLL for long stretches of time. During one of those "off again" periods, L.A. Park won the Mexican National Light Heavyweight Championship for the fourth time when he defeated El Dandy for the title on October 15, 2004, making him one of only two wrestlers to hold the title four times. In early 2007 La Parka returned to CMLL full-time and began a storyline with Perro Aguayo Jr., a storyline that saw the two face off in a singles match at the 2007 Sin Piedad event where L.A. Park won by disqualification after Los Perros del Mal interfered in the match. The storyline ended in mid-2008 with no satisfactory end, instead L.A. Park began a feud with Dr. Wagner Jr. Initially, L.A. Park was the tecnico in the feud, but the fan reactions began to turn against L.A. Park as the CMLL crowd began siding with Dr. Wagner Jr. This led to a double turn between the competitors. Playing the Rudo L.A. Park was disqualified several times for excessive violence, including a match at the CMLL 75th Anniversary Show that L.A. Park lost by disqualification. In the months following the Anniversary show both L.A. Park and Dr. Wagner Jr. left CMLL.

=== Independent circuit (2000–present) ===
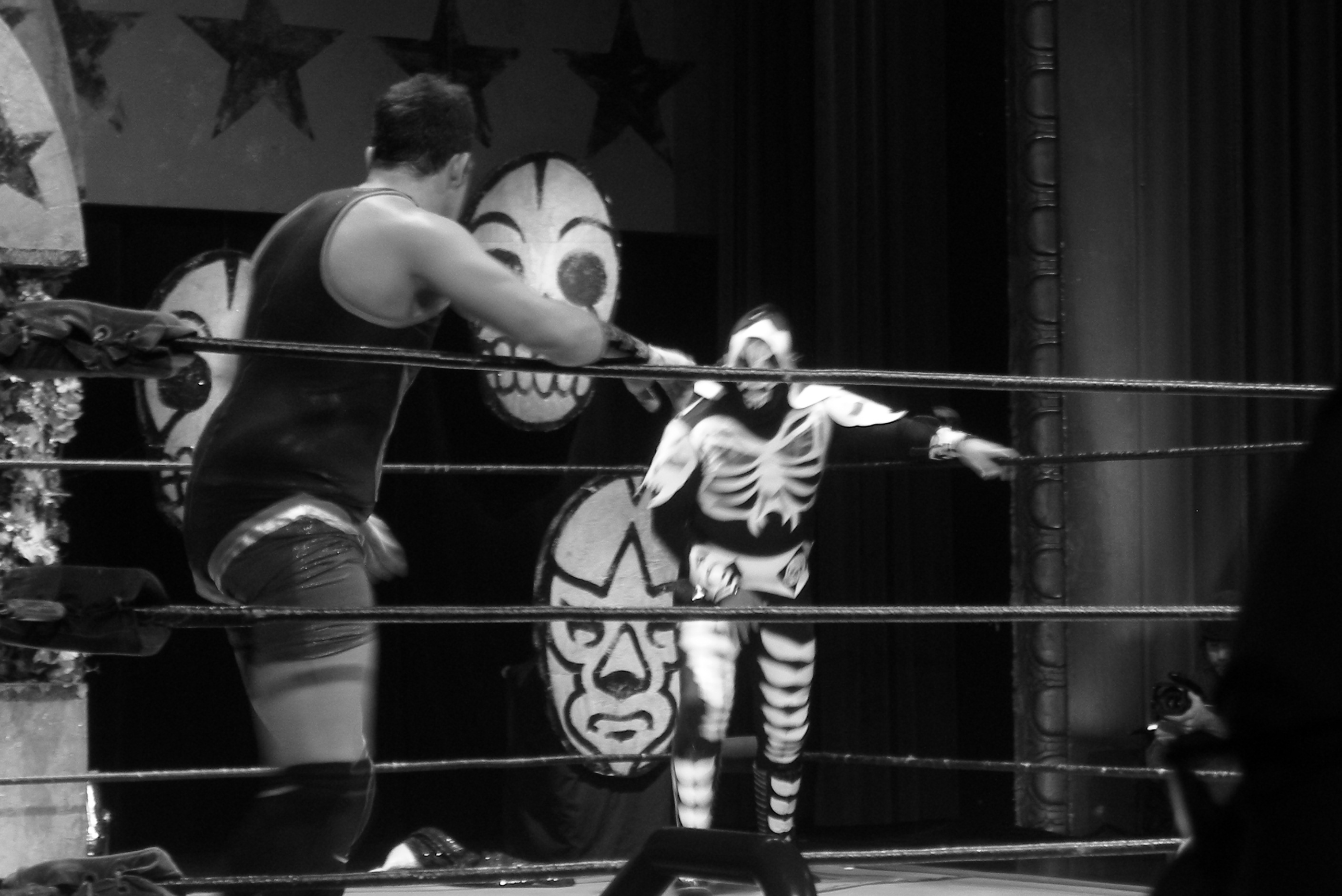
LA Parka in 2007

While working for CMLL La Parka was allowed to also wrestle for independent promotions in Mexico, the US and Japan. During his time on the independent circuit L.A. Park developed a long-running and very intense feud with El Hijo del Santo and Blue Demon Jr., interjecting himself in a storyline that played off the original rivalry between El Santo and Blue Demon creating a feud that headlined various shows all over Mexico and involves three of the most famous masks of the 1980s and 1990s.

In 2004, Tapia made a number of appearances for Total Nonstop Action Wrestling (TNA), as both L.A. Park and La Parka. He wrestled in a Gauntlet for the Gold for the TNA X Division Championship at one of TNA's weekly PPVs and then appeared in yet another X Division gauntlet match at TNA's inaugural monthly PPV Victory Road, losing on both occasions. On May 7, 2005, L.A. Park debuted for Detroit's Independent Wrestling Revolution (IWR) brand Revolucha, teaming with American Kickboxer in a losing effort to El Hijo del Santo and Konnan. Park continued his rivalry with El Hijo del Santo culminating on October 29, 2005, at Revolucha 2: Dia de los Muertos in a Lucha en la Jaula match (a steel cage match). Both Park and Santo had their masks ripped apart and were bleeding profusely during the match. In February 2006, L.A. Park began a bitter feud with then IWR Champion Conrad Kennedy III (CK3). L.A. Park finally defeated CK3 on August 27, 2006, at Brawl at the Hall 6 and defended the IWR Heavyweight Championship on October 14, 2007, at Revolucha 4. After leaving CMLL in 2008 L.A. Park worked regularly for the newly started Perros del Mal Producciones, reviving his old rivalry with Perro Aguayo Jr. Working on the Perros del Mal shows also allowed Tapia to help his son make his start in the wrestling business. Originally Tapia's son wrestled as "Black Spirit" without acknowledging the relationship between L.A. Park and Black Spirit. In early 2010 Tapia officially acknowledge that Black Spirit was his son announcing that he would wrestle as El Hijo de L.A. Park ("The Son of L.A. Park") from then. In 2011, Tapia was part of Lucha Libre USA as LA Park.

=== Xtreme Latin American Wrestling (2004, 2009–2010) ===
L.A. Park won the Xtreme Latin American Wrestling (X-LAW) Heavyweight Championship in Friday, April 9, 2004. The bout was a decision match for the vacant title against Rey Misterio in a X-LAW show co-promoted with Baja Stars Wrestling in Auditorio Fausto Gutiérrez Moreno, in Tijuana. In subsequent years, X-LAW closed down, leaving L.A. Park as the last X-LAW Heavyweight Champion. In 2009, X-LAW's owner, Ernesto Ocampo, Súper Luchas Magazine publisher, decided to restart his promotion, promoting the return show on August 8, 2009, headlined with Tapia against The Sandman for the title. Tapia hyped the show in Ocampo's magazine and website weeks in advance as a "return to the Hardcore style" of ECW. The next show was on March 20, 2010, with L.A. Park facing Sabu in the main event. Super Parka was the special referee. L.A. Park beat Sabu after Super Parka hit Tapia with a steel chair, he fell on top of Sabu for the win. Super Parka then took the belt and ran off with it. This storyline is unresolved, because after Tapia jump to AAA, in subsequent X-LAW shows, Sabu has been promoted as X-LAW top star. On October 30, 2010, Sabu defeated Damián 666 to win Xtreme Latin American Wrestling's International Championship., but no word about the fate of the Heavyweight title.

=== Return to AAA (2010–2013) ===
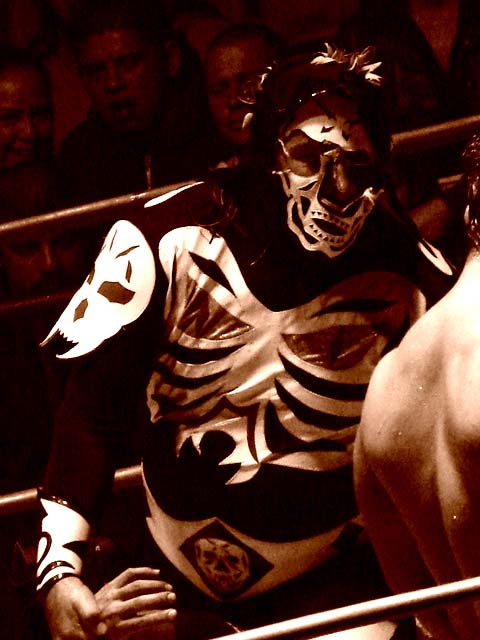
La Parka during a wrestling match

On March 12, 2010, during the 2010 Rey de Reyes event Dorian Roldan, son of AAA boss Joaquin Roldan announced that he, Dorian, was going to take control of the promotion and that he had some help to do so. That help turned out to be L.A. Park, the original La Parka returning to AAA after years and years of legal battles and threats. After unveiling himself during the show L.A. Park announced that he was siding with Konnan and Dorian Roldan, targeting the "impostor Parka". In order to maintain the illusion that L.A. Park did not really work for AAA, L.A. Park claimed that he came to AAA to beat up La Parka, and since he had done that already he was not sure if he even felt like returning to AAA. L.A. Park did however return to an AAA ring as he had another brawl with La Parka on their April 18 television taping. During the event La Parka challenged L.A. Park to a match at Triplemanía XVIII, under any stipulation the original Parka wanted. During AAA's television taping on April 30, 2010, L.A. Park accepted La Parka's challenge for a match at Triplemanía XVIII. At an AAA press conference on May 12, 2010, it was announced that the match between the two would be for the rights to the name "La Parka". At Triplemanía XVIII L.A. Park faced La Parka in the main event of the show. Near the end of the match Park used a tombstone piledriver, a move that is illegal in Lucha Libre. Joaquin Roldan entered the ring, when L.A. Park attempted to use a steel chair on La Parka. When L.A. Park teased using the chair on Joaquin instead, Dorian entered the ring to protest, but was pushed down by Park, who then hit Joaquin with the chair, which caused Dorian to turn on him, hitting him with a steel chair three times. Halloween and Damián 666 from the Perros del Mal wrestling promotion run to the ring to chase Dorian Roldan away. Then they drag L.A. Park on top of La Parka before rúdo referee Hijo del Tirantes counts for three to give L.A. Park the victory. After the bell rings the rest of Los Perros del Mal, (including Park's son Hijo de L.A. Park) came to the ring to celebrate with L.A. Park who had won the rights to the name "La Parka". After a couple of minutes a group of AAA wrestlers led by Octagón came to ringside and in combination with the arena security managed to remove Los Perros del Mal from the ring. La Parka was taken from the ring on a stretcher, not having moved since L.A. Park applied the piledriver. A bit later it was announced that the match results had been thrown out due to interference by Los Perros del Mal, but the following morning it was confirmed that Tapia had indeed won and would now be known as "La Parka" once again. However, on June 10 AAA announced that it would respect Mexico City Boxing and Wrestling Commission's decision to throw out the match and as a result both L.A. Park and La Parka would keep their names. Park stated that for him the Triplemanía match was all about pride and not about names and that all that mattered to him was that he had proven who the true La Parka is, regardless of the names they now go by.

On July 4 La Parka defeated L.A. Park in a rematch. Afterwards, L.A. Park aligned himself with Dorian Roldan's La Sociedad, a superstable consisting of La Legión Extranjera, La Milicia, Los Maniacos and the invading Los Perros del Mal stables. On December 5 at Guerra de Titanes L.A. Park defeated El Mesías to become the number one contender to the AAA Mega Championship, though, at the same event his La Sociedad stable mate El Zorro became the new champion by defeating Dr. Wagner Jr. In February 2011 the next title shot was awarded to Charly Manson to set up a grudge match between him and El Zorro, causing dissension between Park and Konnan. On February 28 Park entered the 2011 Rey de Reyes tournament in order to solidify his spot as the number one contender, defeating Dr. Wagner Jr., Halloween and Nicho el Millonario in his semifinal match. During the match Park was attacked by La Sociedad member Damián 666, who was seemingly trying to prevent him from advancing in the tournament, but instead the interference distracted Wagner Jr. and cost him the match. On March 18 at the Rey de Reyes pay-per-view, Park was eliminated from the finals of the tournament, after brawling with rival El Mesías to a double countout. The following month, when El Zorro caught wind of Park's intention of challenging for his title, he seemingly started interfering in Park's matches under his old mask, costing him back–to–back multi–man tag team matches at the April 27 and 30 TV tapings, escalating the dissension within La Sociedad, eventually leading to the group turning on El Zorro, after which it was revealed that the masked attacker had actually been Charly Manson and this had all been Cibernético's plan to cause dissension within the ranks of La Sociedad. On May 18, Park accepted El Mesías' challenge for a Mask vs. Hair match at Triplemanía XIX. Park added to the stakes of the match by announcing that he would retire, should he lose his mask. On June 18 at Triplemanía XIX, Park defeated El Mesías, forcing him to have his head shaved.

On July 31 at Verano de Escándalo, Park faced La Sociedad stablemate and new AAA Mega Champion Jeff Jarrett and Dr. Wagner Jr. in a three-way match for the title, with Konnan stating that Park's job was to ensure that the title stayed with Jarrett. After Wagner Jr. was eliminated from the match, Jarrett pinned Park to retain his title, when someone masked as El Zorro interfered and hit him with a guitar. This person was later revealed as La Sociedad member Chessman, whom Konnan had sent to interfere in the match in order to have Park go after El Zorro instead of continuing to chase his stablemate's title. On October 9 at Héroes Inmortales, Park took part in the Copa Antonio Peña gauntlet match. After turning on Jeff Jarrett and eliminating him from the match, Park was once again attacked by a masked El Zorro, which led to Electroshock defeating him to win the match. Héroes Inmortales also saw La Parka turning on AAA and joining La Sociedad, which led to him and L.A. Park forming an unlikely tag team on December 1, when they defeated the team of Dr. Wagner Jr. and Electroshock in the main event. On December 16 at Guerra de Titanes, Park defeated Dr. Wagner Jr. for the AAA Latin American Championship. The rivalry between Park and Jeff Jarrett continued on March 18, 2012, at Rey de Reyes, where Jarrett's interference eliminated Park from the Rey de Reyes tournament. During the main event of the evening, Park in turn cost Jarrett the AAA Mega Championship in his match against El Mesías.

On April 30, Park officially quit La Sociedad and joined AAA to continue his rivalry with the Jarretts. On August 5 at Triplemanía XX, Park teamed up with Electrochock as Team Joaquín Roldán in a Hair vs. Hair match, where they faced Team Dorian Roldán (Jeff Jarrett and Kurt Angle), with the Roldáns' hairs on the line. Electroshock won the match for his team by pinning Angle, forcing Dorian to have his head shaved bald. However, after the match, the rudos overpowered the technicos and shaved Joaquín bald.

On April 23, 2013, L.A. Park announced that he had left AAA, citing his desire to be free. Even after his AAA exit he kept promoting the possibility of a Lucha de Apuestas match against Dr. Wagner Jr. possibly promoted by El Hijo del Santo's Todo X el Todos (TxT) promotion. On June 16, Park made an appearance for AAA at Triplemanía XXI to present Blue Demon Jr. with the AAA Latin American Championship belt and officially announce his departure from the promotion.

=== Returns to CMLL (2014, 2015, 2018–2019) ===
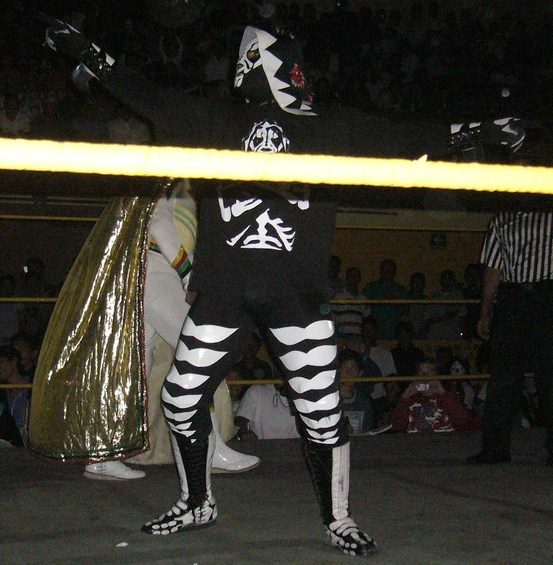
L.A. Park in the ring during a show in Cuernavaca

On October 31, 2014, during CMLL's Dia de los Muerte Super Viernes show L.A. Park returned to CMLL, accompanied by his son. He interrupted a fight between Diamante Azul and Thunder as he walked to the ring, then issued an open challenge to any CMLL wrestler. At the time no one took the challenge. The following week it was announced that Park was not joining CMLL, but was only there to promote a partnership between CMLL and the new independent "Liga Elite" promotion.

On August 19, 2015, Park announced his return to CMLL. On August 28, Park returned to CMLL to team with Volador Jr. and Atlantis to wrestle Dr. Wagner Jr., Rush and La Sombra. On September 8, CMLL announced it had severed its ties with Park for the time being for "violating the rules of CMLL" by insulting the Arena México crowd.

=== Second return to AAA (2018) ===
On June 5, 2018, L.A. Park was revealed as one of the surprise competitors in AAA's Poker de Ases ("Poker Aces") match at Triplemanía XXVI, betting his mask against Psycho Clown, El Hijo del Fantasma and Pentagón Jr in the headline match of the show. Park won the battle, winning the mask of Hijo del Fantasma. On July 21, 2018, at AAA vs. Elite, L.A. Park teamed with Electroshock and Puma King as representatives of Liga Elite, defeating Team AAA (Psycho Clown, El Hijo del Fantasma and Rey Wagner).

=== Major League Wrestling (2018–2022) ===
In April 2018, L.A. Park was announced to be returning to MLW as a member of Promociones Dorado, led by Salina de la Renta. Park then entered a feud with Pentagon Jr. and Rey Fénix, defeating the former in a Mexican Death match at MLW War Games on September 6, 2018. He would continue to feud with the two, as well as other people such as Sami Callihan and Mance Warner, before losing to Pentagon and Fenix in a match for the MLW World Tag Team Championship in November. L.A. Park would then defeat Pentagon on April 4, 2019, at MLW Rise of the Renegades. Park would receive a push in early 2019, after winning the second MLW Battle Riot, earning a future title shot against the MLW World Heavyweight Champion. On September 15, 2019, Salina de la Renta announced that L.A. Park would be cashing in his Battle Riot title shot against Jacob Fatu at Saturday Night SuperFight. On the January 13, 2021, episode of Fusion, L.A. Park, along with his son, El Hijo de L.A. Park, won the MLW World Tag Team Championship, from Marshall and Ross Von Erich, thanks to help from Tom Lawlor. On March 31, 2022, L.A. Park, along with family members L.A. Park Jr. and Hijo de LA Park, participated in an event during Wrestlemania week. Following a match with Fatu and Hammerstone, L.A. Park and his family members allegedly went off script, attacking Hammerstone and Fatu with real punches and chair shots. MLW fired Los Parks the following day as a result of the alleged attack.

== Personal life ==
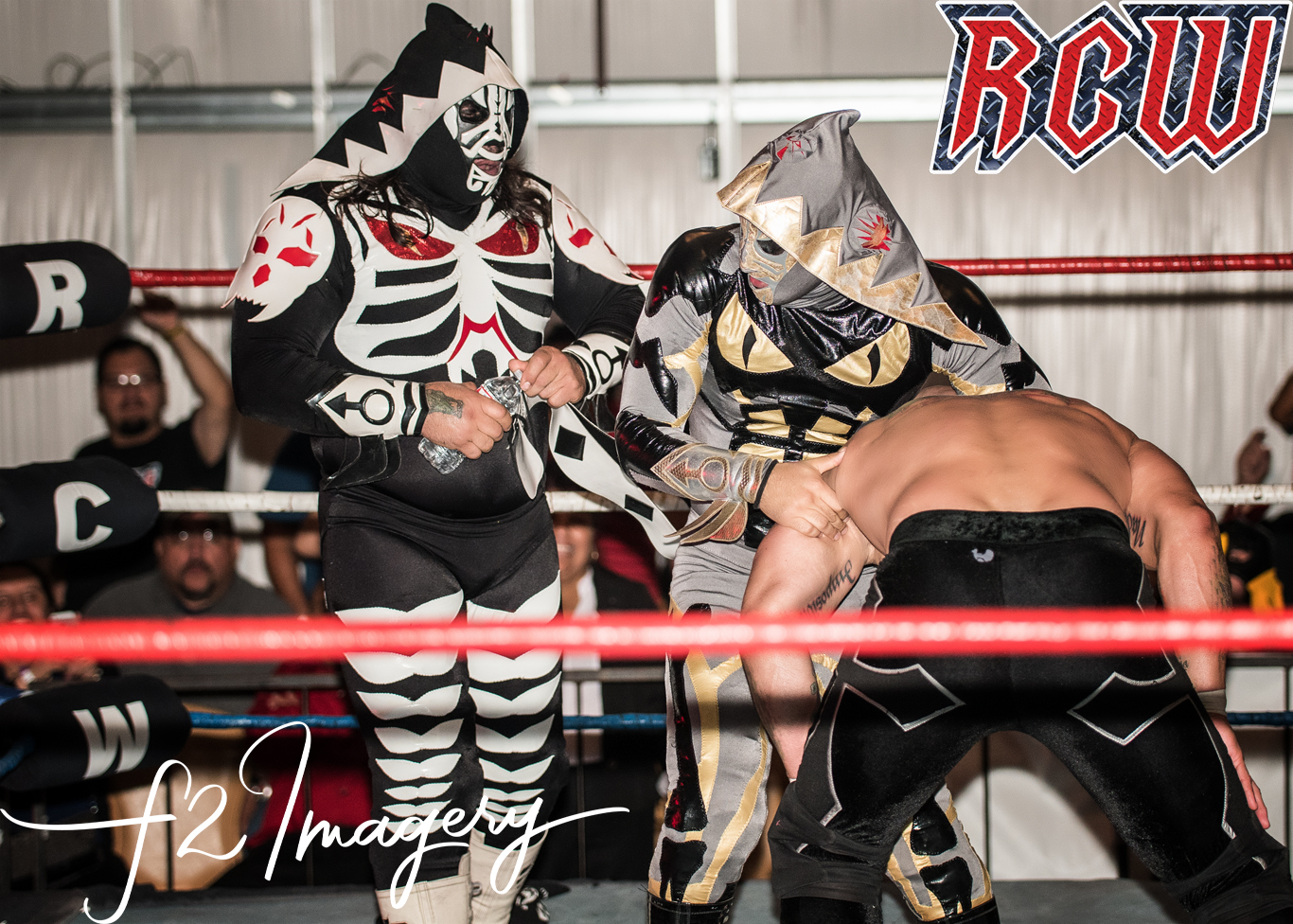
Tapia working with his son, El Hijo de LA Park

Tapia is part of an extended wrestling family that also includes his brother Eustacio Jiménez Ibarra, who wrestled as El Hijo de Cien Caras ("The son of Cien Caras") before his death on November 29, 2010, and his son who wrestles as El Hijo de L.A. Park ("The son of L.A. Park"). Three of Tapia's uncles are also wrestlers working under the ring names Super Parka, Johnny Ibarra, and Desalmado. Super Parka's son, Tapia's cousin, wrestles for CMLL as Volador Jr. In January 2019 L.A. Park introduced "L.A. Park Jr.", presented as a son who decided to follow in L.A. Park's footsteps and become a professional wrestler. He had worked under the ring name "Último Sadox" up until that point. It is unclear if L.A. Park Jr. is related to Tapia or if it is a case of someone paying for the use of the name in the same vein as El Hijo de Cien Caras or El Hijo del Gladiador, who paid for the use of the names. He also has a daughter, born December 13, 2005.

== Championships and accomplishments ==
- Alianza Universal de Lucha Libre
  - Copa Universo (2015)
  - Copa Universo (2019) – with Alberto El Patrón
- Asistencia Asesoria y Administracion
  - AAA Latin American Championship (1 time)
  - IWC World Heavyweight Championship (1 time)
  - IWC World Hardcore Championship (1 time)
  - Mexican National Light Heavyweight Championship (4 times)
- Colossal
  - Copa Frontera (2014) – with Máscara Sagrada and Octagón
- Consejo Mundial de Lucha Libre
  - CMLL World Tag Team Championship (1 time) – with Shocker
- Independent Wrestling Revolution
  - IWR Heavyweight Championship (1 time)
- Generacion XXI
  - G21 Heavyweight Championship (1 time)
  - G21 Tag Team Championship (1 time) – with El Hijo de L.A. Park
- International Wrestling League
  - IWL World Heavyweight Championship (1 time)
- Major League Wrestling
  - MLW World Tag Team Championship (1 time) – with El Hijo de L.A. Park
  - Battle Riot II (2019)
- Pro Wrestling Illustrated
  - Ranked No. 19 of the 500 best singles wrestlers of the PWI 500 in 2012
  - Ranked No. 172 of the 500 best singles wrestlers during the PWI Years in 2003
- The Crash Lucha Libre
  - The Crash Heavyweight Championship (1 time)
- Wrestling Observer Newsletter
  - Mexico MVP (2018)
  - Wrestling Observer Newsletter Hall of Fame (Class of 2018)
- World Wrestling Association
  - WWA Light Heavyweight Championship (2 times)
- Xtreme Latin American Wrestling
  - X–LAW Xtreme Heavyweight Championship (2 times)
- Xtreme Warriors Wrestling
  - XWW Universal Championship (1 time)
- Other achievements
  - Distrito Federal Light Heavyweight Championship (1 time)
  - European Middleweight Championship (2 times)
  - Copa el Mexicano (2011)

== Luchas de Apuestas record ==
Winner (wager)	Loser (wager)	Location	Event	Date	Notes
Clímax II (mask)	El Minero (mask)	Mexico City	Live event	February 17, 1985	
Astro de Oro (mask)	El Asesino de Tepito (mask)	Guatemala City, Guatemala	Live event	1988	
Principe Island (mask)	Gran Cóndor (mask)	N/A	Live event	N/A	
Principe Island (mask)	Gran Cóndor (hair)	N/A	Live event	N/A	
Principe Island (mask)	Príncipe Judas (mask)	N/A	Live event	N/A	
Principe Island (mask)	Guerrero Negro (mask)	N/A	Live event	N/A	
Principe Island (mask)	Bestia Negra I (mask)	N/A	Live event	N/A	
El Hijo del Santo (mask)	Principe Island (mask)	Apatlaco, Mexico State	Live event	November 21, 1987	
Stuka (mask)	Invasor del Norte I (mask)	Monterrey, Nuevo León	Live event	June 26, 1991	
Principe Island (hair)	Bestia Negra I (hair)	N/A	Live event	November 2, 1991	
Panterita del Ring (hair)	Principe Island (hair)	Monterrey, Nuevo León	Live event	1992	
La Parka (mask)	Arandú (hair)	Nuevo Laredo, Tamaulipas	Live event	October 23, 1995	
La Parka (mask)	Pierroth Jr. (mask)	Nuevo Laredo, Tamaulipas	Live event	July 20, 1998	
La Parka (mask)	Wolf (mask)	Reynosa, Tamaulipas	Live event	September 20, 1998	
La Parka (mask)	Gran Markus Jr. (hair)	Nuevo Laredo, Tamaulipas	Live event	July 17, 2000	
La Parka (mask)	Shiryu Dragon (mask)	Guadalajara, Jalisco	Live event	2001	(Note: Lost a Relevos suicida match to Roberto Paz Jr. and Loco Zandokan II.)
La Parka (mask)	El Dandy (hair)	Nuevo Laredo, Tamaulipas	Live event	June 4, 2001	(Note: This was a triangle match that also included Bestia Salvaje)
La Parka (mask)	Huracán Ramírez Jr. (mask)	Monclova, Coahuila	Live event	June 25, 2001	(Note: Lost a Relevos suicida match to Villano IV and Villano V)
La Parka (mask)	Damián 666 (hair)	Tijuana, Baja California	Live event	December 21, 2001	(Note: Steel cage match)
L.A. Park (mask)	Nicho el Millonario (hair)	Tijuana, Baja California	Live event	October 8, 2004	
L.A. Park (mask)	Super Parka (hair)	Tijuana, Baja California	Live event	May 27, 2005	(Note: Steel cage match that also included Dr. Wagner Jr. and Perro Aguayo Jr.)
L.A. Park (mask)	Diluvio Negro II (mask)	Monterrey, Nuevo León	Live event	July 17, 2005	(Note: Steel cage match that also included Heavy Metal, Máscara Sagrada, Héctor Garza and Diluvio Negro I.)
L.A. Park (mask)	Black Tiger III (mask)	Torreón, Coahuila	Live event	February 4, 2006	
L.A. Park (mask)	Villano III (hair)	Mexico City	Live event	May 5, 2007	(Note: Ruleta de la Muerte that also included Silver King, El Satánico, Villano IV, Villano V, Blue Demon Jr. and El Hijo del Solitario.)
L.A. Park (mask)	Máscara Año 2000 (hair)	Cuernavaca, Morelos	Live event	November 1, 2007	
L.A. Park (mask)	Pierroth (hair)	Xalapa, Veracruz	Live event	November 15, 2007	
L.A. Park (mask)	Silver King (hair)	Tlalnepantla de Baz, Mexico State	Live event	December 19, 2007	(Note: This was a Steel cage match that also included Dos Caras Jr., Dr. Wagner Jr., Villano V, Mano Negra, El Canek Jr. and El Hijo de Cien Caras.)
L.A. Park (mask)	Guerrero Rojo (mask)	Mexicali, Baja California	Live event	September 21, 2008	
L.A. Park (mask)	Matematico Jr. (mask)	Monterrey, Nuevo León	Live event	November 1, 2009	(Note: This was a multi-man match that also included Máscara Año 2000 Jr., Perro Aguayo Jr., Axel, Tinieblas Jr., Hijo de Cien Caras and Aníbal Jr.)
L.A. Park (mask)	El Mesías (hair)	Mexico City	Triplemanía XIX	June 18, 2011	
L.A. Park (mask)	El Hijo del Fantasma (mask)	Mexico City	Triplemanía XXVI	August 25, 2018	(Note: This was a Poker de Ases four-way Steel cage match that also involved Psycho Clown and Pentagón Jr.)
