= Espanto =

Espanto may refer to:

== People ==
- Darren Espanto (born 2001), Filipino-Canadian singer and actor
- Espanto I (1930–1968), Mexican professional wrestler
- Espanto II (1932–2010), Mexican professional wrestler
- Espanto III (1940–1996), Mexican professional wrestler
- Espanto Jr. (born 1956), Mexican professional wrestler
- Espanto Jr. (CMLL) (born 1986), Mexican professional wrestler

== Places ==
- Cayo Espanto, island in Belize

== See also ==
- Espanto IV and V, professional wrestling tag team
- Los Hijos del Espanto, professional wrestling tag team
- Los Espantos, professional wrestling stable
