= 1964 in professional wrestling =

1964 in professional wrestling describes the year's events in the world of professional wrestling.

== List of notable promotions ==
Only one promotion held notable shows in 1964.

| Promotion Name | Abbreviation |
|---|---|
| Empresa Mexicana de Lucha Libre | EMLL |

== Calendar of notable live events ==
| Date | Promotion(s) | Event | Location | Main Event |
|---|---|---|---|---|
| April | EMLL | 8. Aniversario de Arena México | Mexico City, Mexico | |
| September 25 | EMLL | EMLL 31st Anniversary Show | Mexico City, Mexico | Rayo de Jalisco defeated Benny Galant (c) in a best two-out-of-three falls match for the NWA World Middleweight Championship |
(c) – denotes defending champion(s)

== Notable events ==
- March – Dick the Bruiser and Wilbur Snyder opened the World Wrestling Association professional wrestling promotion based out of Indianapolis, Indiana.

== Accomplishments and tournaments ==
=== EMLL ===
| Accomplishment | Winner | Date won | Notes |
|---|---|---|---|
| Occidente Welterweight Championship tournament | Vick Amezcua | January 1–17 | |
| NWA World Middleweight Championship #1 contendership tournament | Benny Galant | April 10–24 | |
| NWA World Middleweight Championship #1 contendership tournament | Rayo de Jalisco | September 11–19 | |
| Campeonato 1964 tournament | Rayo de Jalisco and El Santo | October 9–16 | |

== Championship changes ==
=== EMLL ===
NWA World Light Heavyweight Championship
incoming champion – Gory Guerrero
No title changes

NWA World Middleweight Championship
incoming champion – Rayo de Jalisco
| Date | Winner | Event/Show | Note(s) |
| May 30 | Benny Galant | EMLL show | |
| September 25 | Rayo de Jalisco | EMLL 31st Anniversary Show | |

NWA World Welterweight Championship
incoming champion – Karloff Lagarde
No title changes

Mexican National Heavyweight Championship
incoming champion - Pepe Mendieta
No title changes

Mexican National Middleweight Championship
incoming champion – El Santo
No title changes

Mexican National Lightweight Championship
incoming champion – Chanoc
| Date | Winner | Event/Show | Note(s) |
| February 4 | Ulises | EMLL show | |
| June 12 | Chanoc | EMLL show | |

Mexican National Light Heavyweight Championship
incoming champion – Ray Mendoza
No title changes

Mexican National Welterweight Championship
incoming champion – Javier Escobedo
| Date | Winner | Event/Show | Note(s) |
| Uncertain | Vacated | N/A | Championship vacated after Escobedo died in an automobile accident |
| April 21 | Rizado Ruiz | EMLL show | Defeated Black Shadow in a tournament final |

Mexican National Tag Team Championship
incoming champion – Los Rebeldes (Rene Guajardo and Karloff Lagarde) or Los Espantos (Espanto I and Espanto II)
| Date | Winner | Event/Show | Note(s) |
| October 16 | Rayo de Jalisco and El Santo | EMLL show | |

Mexican National Women's Championship
incoming champion – Uncertain
| Date | Winner | Event/Show | Note(s) |
| December 6 | Chabela Romero | EMLL show | |

=== NWA ===
NWA Worlds Heavyweight Championship
Incoming Champion – Lou Thesz
| Date | Winner | Event/Show | Note(s) |
No title changes

== Debuts ==
- Debut date uncertain:
  - Alberto Muñoz
  - Johnny Rodz
  - Joyce Grable
  - Paul Jones
  - Thunderbolt Patterson
  - Lumberjack Pierre
- May 6 – Jimmy Valiant
- October 31 – The Great Kabuki
- November – Kendo Nagasaki

== Retirements ==
- June Byers (1944-1964)
- Dick Hutton (1952-1964)
- Kurt Von Poppenheim (1937-1964)

== Births ==
- Date of birth uncertain:
  - Doug Flex
- January 1 – Mick Tierney
- January 3 – Dan Sileo
- January 4:
  - Riki Takeuchi
  - J. T. Southern
- January 6:
  - Jacqueline
  - Konnan
- January 13 – Zuleyma
- January 14 – Ernest Miller
- January 19 – Sonny Blaze
- February 3 – Pantera
- February 5 – Poison Julie Sawada
- February 7 – Ron Hutchison
- February 9 – Madusa
- February 14 – Ken Shamrock
- February 16 – Shunji Takano
- February 18 – Tim Storm
- February 19 – Botswana Beast
- March 2 – Mike Von Erich(died in 1987)
- March 3 – Glenn Kulka
- March 9:
  - Koki Kitahara
  - Steve Wilkos
- March 14 – Bryan Clark
- March 16 – Henry O. Godwinn
- March 22 – El Felino
- March 31 – Fez Whatley (died in 2021)
- April 10 – EZ Ryder
- April 11 – Takahiro Takigawa
- April 14 – Brian Adams(died in 2007)
- April 18 – Brick Bronsky (died in 2021)
- April 20 – Big Guido
- May 6 – Brian Knobbs
- May 13 – Glacier
- May 17 – Woman(died in 2007)
- May 22 – Marcus Dupree
- May 31 – Randy Mulkey
- June 18 – Big Vito
- June 23 – Mosco de la Merced(died in 2024)
- July 2:
  - Charles Robinson
  - Joe Gomez
  - Hisakatsu Oya
- July 3 – Jack Victory
- July 5 – Jerry Sags
- July 6 – Rick Patterson
- July 31 – Wellington Wilkins Jr.
- August 1 – Prince Iaukea
- August 10 – Savio Vega
- August 19 – Toni Adams (d. 2010)
- August 20 – Tori
- August 23 – TARU
- August 28:
  - The Colorado Kid
  - John Cozman (died in 2016)
- September 2 – Skayde
- September 5 – Emmanuel Yarbrough (died in 2015)
- September 8 – Raven
- September 20 – Scott Hudson
- October 6 – Dixie Carter
- October 9 – Rockin' Robin
- October 26 – Nicole Bass (died in 2017)
- October 30 – Shinobu Kandori
- October 31 – The Boogeyman (wrestler)
- November 13 – Mike Samples
- November 21:
  - Shane Douglas
  - Tsuyoshi Kikuchi
- November 30 – Jushin Thunder Liger
- December 7 – Curtis Hughes
- December 8 – Chigusa Nagayo
- December 12 – Sabu (died in 2025)
- December 18 – Stone Cold Steve Austin
- December 20 – Mark Coleman
- December 23 – Swoll
- December 24 – Andre Baker (died in 2010)

== Deaths ==
- February 12 - Al Pierotti, 68
- March 5 – Rocky Columbo, 35
- May 9 – Erik Malmberg 67
- September 4 – Nick Lassa, 66
- September 11 – Karol Kalmikoff 51
- October 2 – Larry Chene, 40
- October 22 – Tom Packs, 70
