= 1963 in professional wrestling =

1963 in professional wrestling describes the year's events in the world of professional wrestling.

== List of notable promotions ==
Only two promotions held notable shows in 1963.

Promotion Name	Abbreviation
Southwest Sports	Southwest Sports
Empresa Mexicana de Lucha Libre	EMLL

== Calendar of notable shows ==
Date	Promotion(s)	Event	Location	Main event
January 29	Southwest Sports	Parade of Champions	Dallas, Texas	Lou Thesz (c) wrestled Ray Gunkel to a double count-out in a two out of three falls match for the NWA World Heavyweight Championship
April	EMLL	7. Aniversario de Arena México	Mexico City, Mexico	
June 4	Southwest Sports	Parade of Champions	Dallas, Texas	Lou Thesz (c) defeated Dory Dixon in a two out of three falls match for the NWA World Heavyweight Championship
September 6	EMLL	EMLL 30th Anniversary Show (1)	Mexico City, Mexico	Ruben Jaurez defeated Espanto II in a best two-out-of-three falls Lucha de Apuesta mask vs. hair match
September 27	EMLL	EMLL 30th Anniversary Show (2)	Mexico City, Mexico	Espanto I defeated Ruben Jaurez in a best two-out-of-three falls Lucha de Apuesta mask vs. hair match
(c) – denotes defending champion(s)

== Notable events ==
- January 24 – Capitol Wrestling Corporation (CWC) breaks away from the National Wrestling Alliance (NWA) to form the World Wide Wrestling Federation (WWWF).
- April 11 - Buddy Rogers was presented the WWWF World Heavyweight Championship at a WWWF TV taping in Washington, D.C., after being billed as the World Champion since late January.
- May 18 - Bruno Sammartino defeated Buddy Rogers in 48 seconds to win the WWWF World Heavyweight Championship in New York, NY.

== Championship changes ==
=== EMLL ===
NWA World Light Heavyweight Championship
incoming champion – Gory Guerrero
Date	Winner	Event/Show	Note(s)
August 6	Ali Bey	EMLL show	
September 24	Gory Guerrero	EMLL show	

NWA World Middleweight Championship
incoming champion – Rayo de Jalisco
No title changes

NWA World Welterweight Championship
incoming champion – Karloff Lagarde
No title changes

Mexican National Heavyweight Championship
incoming champion - Pepe Mendieta
No title changes

Mexican National Middleweight Championship
incoming champion – El Santo
Date	Winner	Event/Show	Note(s)
April 11	Karloff Lagarde	EMLL show	
June 28	El Santo	EMLL show	

Mexican National Lightweight Championship
incoming champion – Juan Diaz
Date	Winner	Event/Show	Note(s)
October 17	Chanoc	EMLL show	

Mexican National Light Heavyweight Championship
incoming champion – Rubén Juárez
Date	Winner	Event/Show	Note(s)
September 14	Espanto I	EMLL 27th Anniversary Show	
November 30	Ray Mendoza	EMLL show	

Mexican National Welterweight Championship
incoming champion – Karloff Lagarde
Date	Winner	Event/Show	Note(s)
Unknown	Vacated	N/A	Championship vacated, as Lagarde already held the NWA World Welterweight Championship
November 15	Javier Escobedo	EMLL show	

Mexican National Tag Team Championship
incoming champion – Los Rebeldes (Rene Guajardo and Karloff Lagarde) or Los Espantos (Espanto I and Espanto II)
No title changes

Mexican National Women's Championship
incoming champion – Uncertain
No title changes

=== NWA ===
NWA Worlds Heavyweight Championship
Incoming Champion – Buddy Rogers
Date	Winner	Event/Show	Note(s)
January 24	Lou Thesz	NWA show	

== Debuts ==
- Debut date uncertain:
  - Beauregard
  - Coloso Colosetti
  - Donna Christianello
  - Johnny Powers
  - Mr. Wrestling
  - Pepe Casas
  - Skandar Akbar
- January 4 – Ernie Ladd
- January 10 – Dory Funk Jr.
- March – Rubén Pato Soria
- October 13 – Great Kojika
- November – Aníbal

== Retirements ==
- Maria Bernardi (1938-1963)

== Births ==
- Date of birth uncertain:
  - Marie Lograsso (died in 2006?)
- January 2 – Mickie Henson (died in 2022)
- January 3:
  - Vic Grimes
  - New Jack (died in 2021)
- January 6 – Tony Halme(died in 2010)
- January 10 – Firebreaker Chip
- January 29 – Hardcore Holly
- February 22 – Maxx Muscle(died in 2019)
- February 25 – Doug Stahl (died in 2026)
- February 28 – Joey Marella(died in 1994)
- March 7 – Bruce Prichard
- March 19 – Brazo de Plata (died in 2021)
- March 20 – Terry Simms
- April 6 – Neil Superior (died in 1996)
- April 18 – Universo 2000 (died in 2018)
- May 2 – Big Boss Man(died in 2004)
- May 18 – Gary Albright(died in 2000)
- May 19 – Hollywood
- May 29 – Samu
- June 1 – George Hines
- June 4 – Shigeo Miyato
- June 6 – Ahmed Johnson
- June 10:
  - Jeff Bearden
  - Scott Peterson (died in 1994)
- June 12:
  - Jerry Lynn
  - Johnny Hotbody
- June 16 – The Sandman
- June 20 – Don West (died in 2022)
- June 22 – John Tenta(died in 2006)
- June 24 – Ángel Azteca(died in 2007)
- June 25 – Bobby Blaze
- July 11 – Mike Enos
- July 18 – Al Snow
- July 21:
  - Giant Silva
  - Mark Youngblood
- July 22 – Steve Gillespie (died in 2020)
- July 24 – Karl Malone
- July 28 – Lioness Asuka
- July 31 – Chad Brock
- August 2 – El Hijo del Santo
- August 5 – Pat Tanaka
- August 12 – Koji Kitao(died in 2019)
- August 15 – Tamon Honda
- August 16 – Tarzan Goto(died in 2022)
- August 20 – Bob Cook
- August 27 – Sambo Asako (died in 2004)
- August 28 – Lester Speight
- September 15 – Gino Caruso
- September 17 – Masahiro Chono
- September 24 – Sunny Beach
- September 26 – Knuckles Nelson
- September 28 – Steve Blackman
- September 30 – Mustafa Saed
- October 8 – Diana Hart
- October 9 – Tadao Yasuda (died in 2026)
- October 11 – Sam Houston
- October 12 – Dave Legeno (died in 2014)
- October 16 – Missy Hyatt
- October 20 – Brian Costello
- October 23 – Lou Fabiano
- November 11 – Billy Gunn
- December 1 – Dave Sullivan
- December 3 – Steve Simpson
- December 7 – Bruiser Bedlam(died in 2017)
- December 8 – Toshiaki Kawada
- December 12 – Jason Knight
- December 23 – Adrian Serrano

== Deaths ==
- January 19 – Gus Pappas 80
- March 7 – Billy Wolfe 66
- May 10 – Gene Lipscomb 31
- June 2 - Century Milstead, 62
- December 15 – Rikidozan, 39
- December 26 – Gorgeous George, 48
- December 27 - Wildcat Wilson, 63
