= Espantito =

Mexican professional wrestler (1968–2020)

Personal information
- Born: Martín Rodríguez; April 24, 1968 Torreón, Coahuila, Mexico
- Died: October 12, 2020 (aged 52) City Heights, San Diego, California, U.S.
- Children: 2
- Family: Piratita Morgan (brother)

Professional wrestling career
- Ring name(s): El Espantito; Espantito I
- Billed height: 160 cm (5 ft 3 in)
- Billed weight: 65 kg (143 lb)
- Trained by: Espanto II; Indio Chirikawa
- Debut: 1993

Martín Rodríguez (April 24, 1968 – October 12, 2020), better known by the ring name Espantito (Spanish for "Little Terror" or "Little Scare"), was a Mexican professional wrestler. He worked in the Mini-Estrella ("Mini-Star") division, which does not automatically mean that Espantito had dwarfism, as several wrestlers who are just shorter in stature work in the "Mini" division. As a luchador enmascarado, Espantito's real name was not a matter of public record, but it was revealed upon his death in 2020.

Espantito made his professional wrestling debut in 1993 and was allowed to use a version of the Espanto mask and name with permission of the only surviving Espanto, Espanto III. He worked primarily on the Mexican independent circuit, but also worked for AAA, one of Mexico's largest professional wrestling promotions.

== Personal life ==
Martín Rodríguez was born on April 25, 1968, in Torreón, Coahuila, Mexico. Growing up in Torreón, he became a wrestling fan at a young age, often watching local wrestlers Espanto II and Espanto III wrestle in his hometown. In a 1999 interview, he remarked that while his friends would cheer the técnicos (the faces, those that portray the "good guys"), he personally always favored the rudos (those that portray the bad guys, also known as "Heels"). While he wanted to become a professional wrestler, it was hard for him to find a trainer willing to train someone of his diminutive stature, standing only 151 cm (4 ft 11 in) in his teens. His younger brother Raymundo also worked as a professional wrestler under the ring name Piratita Morgan.

He had two children with his wife and settled in City Heights, San Diego, where he owned a landscaping business. In September 2020, Rodríguez was admitted to Sharp Memorial Hospital after being treated for pneumonia and then tested positive for COVID-19. He died on October 12, aged 52.

== Professional wrestling career ==
Due to the secretive culture around masked wrestlers in lucha libre, Espantito's real name was not a matter of common knowledge (prior to his death in 2020), nor was it revealed if he worked under a different ring name before making his in-ring debut as Espantito. It has been confirmed that Espantito trained in his native Torreón, Coahuila under the tutelage of Edgardo Cisneros Díaz, better known as Espanto II, and also received further training from Indio Chirikawa. In the early 1990s, the Mini-Estrella ("Mini-Star") concept was introduced in Mexico, featuring not just midget wrestling, but also wrestlers who were short in stature. The majority of new Mini-Estrellas used the same ring character as regular sized wrestlers, much like Octagoncito being a smaller version of Octagón. Espantito working in this division did not necessarily mean that he had dwarfism. Unlike midget wrestling, where all competitors are under the height of 147 cm (4 ft 10 in), Mini-Estrellas like Espantito, at 160 cm (5 ft 3 in), are often wrestlers of shorter stature, but not true little people in a medical sense.

He was given permission by his trainer to start working as El Espantito, a smaller version of Los Espantos ("The Terrors"), wearing the signature black mask with a white cross on it (popularized by Espanto I, Espanto II and Espanto III), as well as the same black-and-white ring gear of the originals. He was one of the first competitors in the newly created Asistencia Asesoría y Administración's (AAA) Mini-Estrella division in 1993. Most of AAA's Mini-Estrella division consisted of luchadors that had followed AAA founder Antonio Peña from Consejo Mundial de Lucha Libre (CMLL), where some of the Mini-Estrellas changed their name and mask due to the larger version of the character not jumping to AAA at the time. One example was Super Muñequito, who was working as "Angelito Azteca" in CMLL, but had to change his name as Ángel Azteca did not leave CMLL. It has not been revealed if Espectrito also worked in the CMLL Mini-Estrella division at the time of the AAA exodus. For a short while, Espantito was teamed up with a wrestler working as "Espantito II", but Espantito II was only used for a few matches in 1993. Despite working for AAA for several years, he never made an appearance on one of their major shows, despite the Mini-Estrella division being featured on (in some cases headlining) several of them. In 1999, Espantito once again briefly teamed with a wrestler working as "Espantito II", although it is unclear if it was the same worker under the mask from six years prior.

By the late 1990s, Espantito left AAA and began working primarily on the Mexican Independent circuit, often touring with a troupe of Mini-Estrellas such as Octagoncito, Piratita Morgan and Tzuki. The group toured the United States, working for various National Wrestling Alliance (NWA) promotions and showcasing the lucha libre and Mini-Estrella styles throughout the south-west. On September 20, 2009, Espantito faced Octagoncito for the vacant NWA World Midget's Championship at a Pro Wrestling Revolution (PWR) show, which saw Octagoncito win the match and the championship. The troupe of Mini-Estrellas would continue to use the NWA World Midget's Championship as part of their shows, promoting matches where Octagoncito would defend the championship against Espantito. Later on, when Pro Wrestling Revolution split from the NWA, the championship was re-branded the PWR World Midget's Championship, with Octagoncito defending it on occasion against Espectrito in various southern states. His last documented match took place at a Expo Lucha show on August 18, 2019, where he and Felinito lost to Mini Halcón and Payacito.

== Legal rights to the Espanto name ==
While several wrestlers have used the "Espanto" name over the years, El Hijo del Espanto I claims to have full rights to the use of the name "Espanto" in lucha libre, though his claim to the name did not seem all-inclusive as Espanto Jr. was featured on CMLL's roster. It is unclear if Espantito legally owned the name, or if that was what prevented the "Espantito II" name from being used more than once or twice.
