= Piratita Morgan =

Mexican professional wrestler

Personal information
- Born: Raymundo Rodríguez; March 15, 1969 Mexico
- Died: July 8, 2018 (aged 49) Tlaxcala City, Mexico
- Family: Espantito (brother)

Professional wrestling career
- Ring name(s): Battalion; Coquito Rojo; Payasito Rojo; Piratita Morgan
- Billed height: 140 cm (4 ft 7 in)
- Billed weight: 80 kg (180 lb)
- Debut: September 22, 1989

Raymundo Rodríguez (15 March 1969 – 8 July 2018) was a Mexican professional wrestler best known under the ring name Piratita Morgan. He also worked as a masked wrestler, under the names Battalion, Payasito Rojo and Coquito Rojo. Rodríguez was one of the first wrestlers to compete in the Mini-Estrella ("Mini Star") division in Mexico, a division for both dwarf wrestlers and wrestlers of short stature, often portraying a smaller version of a regular-sized wrestler. Rodríguez performed as a shorter version of Pirata Morgan from the beginning of his career to his death. Rodríguez's brother was also a Mini-Estrella, known under the ring name Espantito. He is not related to the wrestler known as Piratita Morgan Jr.

For the majority of his career, Rodríguez worked as a rudo, portraying one of the bad guys in the ring. He had a long-running rivalry with Mascarita Sagrada in which the two competed in several Luchas de Apuestas ("bet matches") throughout the years, each ending with a loss for Rodríguez. As a result, he had to have his hair shaved off. His most high-profile match was the main event of Triplemanía III-A, the first and only time that the Mini-Estrellas were given the main event spot at a Triplemanía show. Throughout his career Rodríguez worked for every major wrestling promotion in Mexico, in addition to working for the World Wrestling Federation and Total Nonstop Action Wrestling in the US, as well as for promotions in Japan and Puerto Rico.

== Professional wrestling career ==
=== Piratita Morgan (1989-1994) ===
In 1989 Empresa Mexicana de Lucha Libre (EMLL), Mexico's oldest professional wrestling promotion, created a new concept, the Mini-Estrella division. The division was created by Antonio Peña who worked for EMLL, who came up with the idea of using both little people and short wrestlers together and to have the Mini-Estrellas work as smaller versions of popular wrestlers of the time. Rodríguez was one of the first wave of Mini-Estrellas that Peña hired, giving him the ring name "Piratita Morgan", patterning him after Pirata Morgan who worked for EMLL. Rodríguez, like his larger counterpart Piratita Morgan was a rudo, or heel (those that portray "the bad guy" in wrestling) and would often accompany the regular-sized Pirata Morgan to matches and at times help Pirata Morgan cheat. Pirata Morgan wore an eyepatch as part of his wrestling outfit because he had lost an eye early in his career, but Rodríguez wore the eyepatch only during his wrestling appearances in order to mimmick Pirata Morgan.

One of his first major matches as Piratita Morgan took place on September 22, 1989, at the EMLL 57th Anniversary Show. Piratita Morgan, MS-1/2, and Espectrito (collectively known as Los Pequeño Infernales) lost to the team of Mascarita Sagrada, Pequeño Cobarde, and Aguilita Solitaria in a six-man tag team match. Over the years Piratita Morgan and Mascarita Sagrada travelled across Mexico, Puerto Rico and Japan, facing each other in one-on-one or tag team matches for most of their careers. Their first appearance outside of Mexico came when the two travelled to Puerto Rico for the World Wrestling Council (WWC) 17th Anniversary show, at which Piratita Morgan and Espectrito defeated Mascarita Sagrada and Aguilita Solitaria. The rivalry between Piratita Morgan and Mascarita Sagrada led to the two facing off in one of the first ever Lucha de Apuestas, or "bet matches", in the Mini-Estrellas division. On August 2, 1991, Piratita Morgan lost a match to Mascarita Sagrada, which meant that Morgan was forced to have all his hair shaved off as per the Lucha de Apuestas stipulation, if he had won Mascarita Sagrada would have been forced to unmask. In the summer of 1992 a large number of wrestlers chose to leave CMLL, following Antonio Peña as he struck out on his own and created a new wrestling promotion called Asistencia Asesoría y Administración (AAA). Most of the Minis division left with Peña including Rodríguez.

He worked his first AAA show on July 3, 1992, teaming with Jerrito Estrada and Picudito as they lost to the team of Angelito Azteca, Mascarita Sagrada and Octagoncito. The match ended in a count out a Jerrito Estrada and Piratita Morgan started to fight with each other instead of their opponents, as the start of a storyline feud between the two. The storyline led to Piratita Morgan defeating Jerrito Estrada in a Lucha de Apuestas match on July 31, which Estrada was booked to win, forcing Piratita Morgan to have all his hair shaved off. The match would later be televised on August 9. The same result would happen in late1993, where Piratita Morgan was once again shaved bald after losing a Lucha de Apuestas match to Jerrito Estrada.

=== Payasito Rojo Rojo (1994-1995) ===
In 1994 Peña, based on the success of a trio of clown characters known as Los Payasos, decided to create a Mini-Estrella version of the trio, Los Payasitos. Rodríguez became the masked "Payasito Rojo" ("Little Red Clown"), while La Parkita became "Payasito Amarillo", and Fuercito Guerrera became "Payasito Azul". In their first match under the new character, Los Payasitos lost to Mascarita Sagrada, Octagoncito and Super Super Muñequito in two falls. The popularity of the Mini-Estrella division, led Peña to give them the main event of Triplemania III-A, AAA's biggest show of the year, marking the only time in AAA history that happened. The match saw 13 Mini-Estrellas compete in a Steel cage match where the last wrestler in the cage would be forced to unmask. After Bandita, Espectrito I, Espectrito II, Jerrito Estrada, Fuercita Guerrera, Mascarita Sagrada, Mini Calo, Octagoncito, La Parkita, Payasito Azul and Torerito all left the cage it was down to Super Muñequito and Payasito Rojo in the cage, with Super Muñequito winning the mask, forcing Payasito to unmask and reveal that it was Raymundo Rodríguez under the mask. Rodríguez only worked one more match under the Payasito Rojo name, a loss on August 7, 1995.

=== Piratita Morgan (1996-1997) ===
Rodríguez left AAA in 1995 and resurfaced in 1996, once again working as "Piratita Morgan", working a series of shows for WWC in Puerto Rico. He would later work for PROMELL in Mexico, through which he was able to work in the United States, working two matches for World Championship Wrestling (WCW). His first match was a dark match prior to the pay-per-view broadcast of Starrcade (1996), where he and Jerrito Estrada lost to Mascarita Sagrada and Octagoncito, and again the following day on Monday Nitro where the outcome was the same.

=== Battalion (1997-1999) ===
In 1997 the U.S. based World Wrestling Federation (WWF) struck up a working agreement with AAA to bring in some of the luchadors to work on various WWF shows while the WWF would on occasion send some of their workers to Mexico to work for AAA. In late 1997 the WWF introduced the Mini-Estrellas from Mexico, but since most of the minis used ring characters based on regular sized competitors that the US audience did not know. Most of the wrestlers were given new ring characters and masks. Rodríguez was given the ring name "Battalion", a soldier character complete with camouflage tights and a soldier's helmet to wear during his entrance. His first match as Battalion took place on November 10, 1997, at a Shotgun Saturday Night show where he lost to Max Mini (Tuzki under a new mask and name). Battalion, El Torito and Tarantula lost to Max Mini, Mosaic and Nova in the second match of WWF's 1998 Royal Rumble pay-per-view. Rodríguez worked for the WWF throughout 1998 and 1999, including several matches on WWF Super Astros against Max Mini and Nova. His last documented match for the WWF was on Sunday Night Heat on July 11, 1999, where he, Tarantula, Max Mini and Nova worked against Al Snow in a 4-on-1 handicap tag team match that ended in a "no contest".

=== Piratita Morgan (2000-2018) ===
After his stint in the WWF ended, Rodríguez returned to Mexico to work on the independent circuit, once again competing as Piratita Morgan. Records are unclear on how Piratita Morgan became the holder of the WWA World Minis Championship, the first records of his reign was on May 4, 2000, when he defended the championship against Octagoncito on an International Wrestling Revolution Group (IWRG) show. In late 2000 he reprised his "clown" character, working as the masked "Coquito Rojo" leading up to a Lucha de Apuestas mask loss to Mascarita Sagrada on December 21, 2000.

On November 7, 2004, Piratita Morgan lost to Mascarita Sagrada as part of Total Nonstop Action Wrestling's (TNA) Victory Road PPV, his first and only appearance for TNA. In 2005 WWE (formerly WWF) introduced a "Juniors division", which was composed of various Mexican Mini-Estrellas. Rodríguez was one of the workers hired by WWE, but unlike most of the Junior competitors he never wrestled for the company, only appearing in backstage segments. On February 8, 2009, Piratita Morgan lost the WWA World Minis Championship to Octagoncito. In subsequent years Rodríguez worked intermittendly on the Independent circuit in both Mexico and the United States, working for promotions such as IWRG, Perros del Mal Producciones, All Pro Wrestling and Lucha VaVoom. His last verified match was for a local AAA show in Texoco on September 9, 2017, where Piratita Morgan and Barbrita Negra defeated Coco Blanco and Payasito Coco Verde.

== Death ==
Rodríguez was admitted to hospital on July 6, 2018, after deteriorating health. He died two days later on July 8.

== Championships and accomplishments ==
- World Wrestling Association

- WWA World Minis Championship (1 time, first)

== Luchas de Apuestas record ==
Winner (wager)	Loser (wager)	Location	Event	Date	Notes
Mascarita Sagrada (mask)	Piratita Morgan (hair)	Mexico City	Live event	August 2, 1991	
Jerrito Estrada (hair)	Piratita Morgan (hair)	Monterrey, Nuevo León	Live event	July 31, 1992	
Jerrito Estrada (hair)	Piratita Morgan (hair)	Tonala, Jalisco	Live event	November 5, 1993	
Super Muñequito (mask)	Payasito Rojo (mask)	Orizaba, Veracruz	Triplemanía III-A	June 10, 1995	(Note: Steel cage match that also included Espectrito I, Espectrito II, Jerrito Estrada, Fuercita Guerrera, Mascarita Sagrada, Mini Calo, Ninjita, Octagoncito, La Parkita, Payasito Azul and Torerito.)
Mascarita Sagrada (mask)	Piratita Morgan (hair)	Cuautitlán, Mexico State	Live event	November 26, 1996	
Mascarita Sagrada (mask)	Coquito Rojo (mask)	Nezahualcoyotl, Mexico State	Live event	December 21, 2000	
Mascarita Sagrada (mask)	Piratita Morgan (hair)	Tijuana, Baja California	Live event	November 23, 2001	
