= Espanto III =

Mexican professional wrestler

- Vázquez wearing the distinctive Espanto mask, from the cover of a wrestling magazine in 1964

Personal information
- Born: Miguel Vázquez Bernal; February 11, 1940 Torreón, Coahuila, Mexico
- Died: December 8, 1996 (aged 56) Ciudad Juárez, Chihuahua, Mexico
- Cause of death: Heart attack
- Children: Espanto IV and V (sons)
- Family: José Eusebio Vázquez Bernal (brother)

Professional wrestling career
- Ring name(s): Mickey Vázquez; Espanto III "Miguel Vázquez Cisneros"
- Debut: before November 13, 1962
- Retired: 1984

Miguel "Miguelito" Vázquez Bernal (February 11, 1940 – December 8, 1996), was a Mexican professional wrestler, known under the ring name Espanto III ("Terror 3"). During his career in professional wrestling, he formed a long running, successful trio known as Los Espantos ("The Terrors") with his brother José Eusebio Vázquez Bernal (known as Espanto I) and Fernando Cisneros Carrillo (Espanto II). Los Espantos was one of the first examples of an identical trio, where all three members of the team used the same name, mask and wrestling gear only distinguished by a number. After his retirement, he trained his sons for a professional wrestling career, and they later followed in his footsteps as Espanto IV and Espanto V.

== Early life ==
Miguel Vázquez Bernal, known as "Miguelito" to his friends and family, was born on February 11, 1940, in Torreón, Coahuila, Mexico. He was seven years younger than his brother José Eusebio and possibly had more siblings. José Eusebio became a professional wrestler around 1953, which inspired his younger brother to later follow in his footsteps.

== Professional wrestling career ==
Miguel Vázquez trained for his professional wrestling career in the local wrestling school in Torreón, the same place where his brother José Eusebio first wrestled. He worked as "Mickey Vázquez" in the early 1960s, but records are unclear as to when he made his debut.

=== Los Espantos ===
In 1958 or 1959, José Eusebio had begun working as "El Espanto" ("The Terror"). A short time afterwards, José Eusebio's best friend, Fernando Cisneros Carrillo, adopted the character Espanto II, and they became a regular tag team known as Los Espantos. By November 1962, both Espanto I and Espanto II had lost their masks in a Lucha de Apuestas ("bet match"). At this point, Miguel Vázquez donned the distinctive black and white mask of Los Espantos and became Espanto III. Thus, Los Espantos became a regular trio, being one of the first to work as an "identical trio" by using the same name with only numbers to distinguish themselves, a tradition that still exists in lucha libre, a professional wrestling style originally from Mexico. Initially, he mainly supported Espanto I and II as they fought against rivals El Santo and Rubén Juárez respectively, serving as their corner man during Lucha de Apuestas matches. Not long after his debut as Espanto III, he won his first Lucha de Apuestas against Javier Escobedo, forcing Escobedo to be shaved bald.

The Los Espantos trio got their biggest win ever when they defeated the "dream team" of Mexican tecnicos (those that portray the "good guys") El Santo, Blue Demon and Mil Máscaras. In the early parts of 1964, Espanto III won two additional Lucha de Apuestas matches, leaving both Alex Montaña and Humberto Garza without their hair as a result. The Apuesta wins were used to build a storyline feud between Espanto III and Huracán Ramírez through the first half of 1964. The storyline came to a conclusion on June 12, where Espanto III was unmasked after losing a Lucha de Apuestas to Ramírez. As each Espanto lost their mask, they claimed that their last name was "Vázquez Cisneros", combining their last names to hide the fact that they were not all brothers.

On May 30, 1968, Miguel's older brother José, as well as fellow wrestler Popeye Franco, was killed by the owner of a cantina during a bar fight. At the time of his death, Los Espantos were set to do a world tour with dates planned for Germany, France, Spain and Japan. The promoters offered Espanto II the opportunity to go alone or with Espanto III, but he declined due to the loss of his close friend. After the death of his brother, Miguel wrestled less regularly and, by the early 1970s, both Miguel and Cisneros became semi-retired from wrestling, working only a limited schedule in Northern Mexico. As Espanto II and III, the duo held the Northern Tag Team Championship at one point in the 1970s, before Espanto II retired in 1979. At one point during the 1970s, Espanto III lost a Lucha de Apuestas to La Sombra, (Note: Not the same wrestler as the most recent La Sombra.) marking the first time he lost his hair after losing a Lucha de Apuestas. In 1984, he lost another Lucha de Apuestas to Black Charly. A short time later, he retired from wrestling.

== Personal life ==
After his retirement from in-ring competition, Vázquez took part in training his sons for a professional wrestling career; they would eventually become known as Espanto IV and Espanto V. On December 8, 1996, Miguel Vázquez died from a heart attack in his hometown of Ciudad Juárez, Chihuahua, at the age of 56.

== Legacy ==
The Los Espantos trio influenced several subsequent teams and individual wrestlers to use the Espanto name, not just limited to his sons Espanto IV and V. In 1984, Vázquez and Cisneros allowed Jesús Andrade Salas to adopt the identify of "Espanto Jr.", who was presented as the son of Espanto I and wore the signature black and white mask of Los Espantos. Andrade would be succeeded by his son, who in 2012, also began working as Espanto Jr. The surviving Espantos also gave permission for Los Hijos del Espanto to use the name and masks. In 1998, Cisneros, as the last surviving Espanto, endorsed the Mini-Estrella wrestler El Espantito ("The Little Terror") to use the Espanto name and mask.

== Championships and accomplishments ==
- Chihuahua State wrestling

- Northern Middleweight Championship (1 time)
- Northern Tag Team Championship (1 time) – with Espanto II
- Ciudad Juárez Lucha Libre Hall of Fame (2010)

== Luchas de Apuestas record ==
Winner (wager)	Loser (wager)	Location	Event	Date	Notes
Espanto III (mask)	Javier Escobedo (hair)	Guadalajara, Jalisco	Independent Show	1962	
Espanto III (mask)	Alex Montaña (hair)	Tampico, Tamaulipas	Independent Show	1964	
Espanto III (mask)	Humberto Garza (hair)	Mexico City	EMLL Show	May 1, 1964	
Huracán Ramírez (mask)	Espanto III (mask)	Mexico City	EMLL Show	June 12, 1964	
La Sombra (hair)	Espanto III (hair)	Torreón, Coahuila	Independent Show	1970s	
Black Charly (hair)	Espanto III (hair)	Torreón, Coahuila	Independent Show	1984	
