= WWA World Minis Championship =

Professional wrestling midget championship

Details
- Promotion: World Wrestling Association
- Date established: No later than May 4, 2000
- Current champion(s): Mascarita Sagrada
- Date won: February 18, 2013
Statistics
- First champion(s): Piratita Morgan
- Most reigns: Octagoncito (2 reigns)
- Longest reign: Piratita Morgan (3,508 days)
- Shortest reign: Octagoncito (107 days)

The WWA World Minis Championship is a professional wrestling championship promoted by the Mexican Lucha libre wrestling-based promotion the World Wrestling Association (WWA). The championship is exclusively competed for in the Mini-Estrellas, or Minis, division. A "Mini" is not necessarily a person with dwarfism, as in North American Midget wrestling; it can also be very short wrestlers who work in the Mini-Estrellas division. The championship was created at some point before May 5, 2000 where Piratita Morgan successfully defended it against Octagoncito, but the actual creation date, or how Piratita Morgan became champion has not been documented.

As it was a professional wrestling championship, the championship was not won not by actual competition, but by a scripted ending to a match determined by the bookers and match makers. (Note: Hornbaker (2016) p. 550: "Professional wrestling is a sport in which match finishes are predetermined. Thus, win–loss records are not indicative of a wrestler's genuine success based on their legitimate abilities – but on now much, or how little they were pushed by promoters") On occasion the promotion declares a championship vacant, which means there is no champion at that point in time. This can either be due to a storyline, (Note: Duncan & Will (2000) p. 271, Chapter: Texas: NWA American Tag Team Title [World Class, Adkisson] "Championship held up and rematch ordered because of the interference of manager Gary Hart") or real life issues such as a champion suffering an injury being unable to defend the championship, (Note: Duncan & Will (2000) p. 20, Chapter: (United States: 19th Century & widely defended titles – NWA, WWF, AWA, IW, ECW, NWA) NWA/WCW TV Title "Rhodes stripped on 85/10/19 for not defending the belt after having his leg broken by Ric Flair and Ole & Arn Anderson") or leaving the company. (Note: Duncan & Will (2000) p. 201, Chapter: (Memphis, Nashville) Memphis: USWA Tag Team Title "Vacant on 93/01/18 when Spike leaves the USWA.")

== Title history ==
Key
No.	Overall reign number
Reign	Reign number for the specific champion
Days	Number of days held
N/A	Unknown information
†	Championship change is unrecognized by the promotion
+	Current reign is changing daily

No.	Champion	Championship change			Reign statistics		Notes	Ref.
No.	Champion	Date	Event	Location	Reign	Days	Notes	Ref.
1	Piratita Morgan	May 4, 2000	Live event	Villahermosa, Tabasco	1	3,508		
2	Octagoncito	December 11, 2009	Live event	Mexico City	1	177		
3	Mascarita Plateada	June 6, 2010	Live event	Mexico City	1	325		
4	Lobito	April 27, 2011	Live event	Tokyo	1	663		
5	Octagoncito	February 18, 2013	Live event	N/A	2	873		
6	Mascarita Sagrada	February 18, 2013	Live event	London	1	3,539+		

== Reigns by combined length ==
Key

Symbol	Meaning
†	Indicates the current champion
¤	The exact length of at least one title reign is uncertain, so the shortest possible length is used.

Rank	Wrestler	No. of reigns	Combined days
1	Piratita Morgan	1	3,508¤
2	Mascarita Sagrada †	1	4,412+
3	Octagoncito	2	1,050
4	Lobito	1	663
5	Mascarita Plateada	1	325

== See also ==
- Midgets' World Championship
- AAA World Mini-Estrella Championship
- CMLL World Mini-Estrella Championship
- Mexican National Mini-Estrella Championship
