= Los Hijos del Espanto =

Professional wrestling tag team

Tag team
- Members: El Hijo del Espanto I El Hijo del Espanto II
- Debut: March 4, 2000

Los Hijos del Espanto (Spanish for "the Sons of Espanto") is a Mexican professional wrestling tag team who has primarily worked as a rudo (term used for wrestlers who portray the "bad guys") team, consisting of El Hijo del Espanto I and El Hijo del Espanto II. While their names indicate that they are supposedly sons of one of Los Espantos, they are not related to either Espanto I, Espanto II or Espanto III, but were instead given the rights to use the names by Espanto II.

Los Hijos del Espanto are brothers, with Hijo del Espanto II being the older brother. Since the younger brother started to use the name first, the older brother was designated as "Hijo del Espanto II". Their birth names are not a matter of public record as they are both enmascarados, or masked wrestlers; in lucha libre, the identities of masked wrestlers are kept secret unless unmasked.

== Personal lives ==
The man who would later be known as "Hijo del Espanto II" (Spanish for "Son of Terror 2" or literally "Son of Espanto 2") was born in 1971 in Torreón, Coahuila, Mexico. Seven years later, his brother, later known as "Hijo del Espanto I", was born on March 20, 1977. Being seven years apart, the two were not into the same hobbies as children, with the older Hijo del Espanto brother being the first to be interested in lucha libre, or professional wrestling.

== Prior to teaming up ==
As both Hijo del Espantos are working as enmascarados, or masked professional wrestlers, their birthnames are not publized as is tradition in lucha libre when a wrestler has never been unmasked in the ring. Due to the secrecy, it is not clear if Hijo del Espanto I wrestled under a different name before making his debut as El Hijo del Espanto in 1993. Hijo del Espanto I was trained by Fernando Cisneros Carrillo, better known as Espanto II, and Cisneros allowed Hijo del Espanto I to use the name. In 1999, Espantito, a diminutive version of Los Espantos, commented that he had trained with El Hijo del Espanto I under CIsneros, remembering him as a dedicated wrestler with a "great mind" for the sport.

In 1995, Hijo del Espanto defeated El Latino Jr. to win the Coahuila state Lightweight Championship, a title he held for most of the year. In 2000, Hijo del Espanto won a local championship billed as the "Word Light Heavyweight Championship", defeating Emisario de la Muerte. Hijo del Espanto I's older brother made his in-ring debut in 1988, according to one interview, although Hijo del Espanto II did not reveal any other details about his ring name or activities at that point in time.

== Team history ==
On March 4, 2000, the "El Hijo del Espanto II" character was revealed, with his younger brother becoming "El Hijo del Espanto I". From that point on, the two brothers would regularly perform as Los Hijos del Espanto on the Mexican independent circuit, including working for International Wrestling Revolution Group (IWRG) in 2000 and 2001. The team also made occasional trips to the United States, especially the southern states of California and Texas. A match report from 2003 described the team as "walking in Los Espantos footsteps, using a combination of matwork and out of control brawling".

On September 25, 2005, El Hijo del Espanto II won his first Lucha de Apuestas ("bet match") at a Lucha Libre Elite (LLE) show in Monterrey, Nuevo León. Hijo del Espanto II defeated a wrestler known simply as Sky, forcing Sky to unmask and reveal his real name per lucha libre traditions. Hijo del Espanto II was one of 57 wrestlers that competed in the Amigos para Siempe ("Friends forever") elimination match on August 11, 2012. He was eliminated about halfway through, with the match being won by Axel.

=== Owning the Espanto name ===
El Hijo del Espanto I has, on a couple of occasions, stated that he was given the rights to use the "Espanto" name by Fernando Cisneros, who was the only living member of Los Espantos at the time. Shortly after the introduction of El Hijo del Espanto II, Mexican wrestling promotion AAA introduced a team also known as "Los Hijos del Espanto". At the time, El Hijo del Espanto I complained to both AAA and the local boxing and wrestling commission that they were infringing on his copyrights. The AAA Los Hijos del Espanto only worked a couple of matches and were then dropped. Afterwards, it was revealed that the second set of Los Hijos del Espantos were portrayed by Sergio and César Andrade Salas, who were brothers of Jesús Andrade Salas, who portrayed the original Espanto Jr. from 1984 to 1995.

In 2012, Consejo Mundial de Lucha Libre (CMLL) introduced a wrestler named Espanto Jr., who is the son of the original Espanto Jr. In the days after his introduction, El Hijo del Espanto I once again tried to assert his rights to the "Espanto" name, based on the rights given to him by Cisneros. He demanded that, like the fake Los Hijos del Espanto, this Espanto Jr. should stop using the name and not wear the mask of Los Espantos. CMLL never responded to the claims, but kept promoting Espanto Jr. on their shows, without the boxing and wrestling commission preventing it.

It has not been specifically verified if Hijo del Espanto I also owns the rights to the name of Mini-Estrella Espantito ("Little Terror") or not, since Hijo del Espanto I was given ownership of the "Espanto" name by Espanto II after the in-ring debut of Espantito.

== Championships and accomplishments ==
- Coahuila State wrestling

- Coahuila Lightweight Championship (1 time) – El Hijo de Espanto I
- World Light Heavyweight Championship (1 time) – El Hijo de Espanto I

- Juniors

- Juniors Cruiserweight Championship (1 time, current) – El Hijo de Espanto II

- Lucha Libre Unida

- LLU Light Heavyweight Championship (1 time) – El Hijo de Espanto I

== Luchas de Apuestas record ==
| Winner (wager) | Loser (wager) | Location | Event | Date | Notes |
|---|---|---|---|---|---|
| El Hijo del Espanto II (mask) | Sky (mask) | Monterrey, Nuevo León | Independent Show | September 25, 2005 | |
