= Job (professional wrestling) =

Professional wrestling slang

In professional wrestling slang, a job is a losing performance in a wrestling match. It is derived from "doing one's job,” a euphemism to hide kayfabe-related information. When a wrestler is booked to lose a match, it is described as "a job". The act itself is jobbing, whereas the act of booking (rather than being booked) to job is called jobbing out. To lose a match fairly (meaning without any kayfabe rules being broken) is to job cleanly.

Wrestlers who routinely (or exclusively) lose matches while having little to no offense are known as jobbers. A wrestler skilled at enhancing the matches they lose, as opposed to a jobber, is called a carpenter. Carpenters often put up a fight against a wrestler higher up on the card before eventually losing. In the post-kayfabe era the term has taken on a negative connotation, leading to the use of the neutral term enhancement talent.

== Definition ==
A job presented as being the result of an extremely close, entertaining match, or underhanded tactics on the part of an opponent, will not necessarily tarnish a wrestler's reputation, especially if the situation is presented as one in which the wrestler deserved to win but was cheated. At other times a high-profile loss, particularly one which makes the wrestler in question look weak, foolish, or otherwise damages their reputation, might signify certain behind-the-scenes events that have real-life implications on a wrestler.

Such a job may mark the end of a push, a departure from the company, or a loss of faith in the wrestler as a marketable commodity. As a result, it may also mark a downward slide in a wrestler's career. This is especially the case when the wrestler is beaten very easily, or squashed.

Sometimes, jobbing is presented to a wrestler because of the problems and bad working relationship that the wrestler and the owner of the promotion have. At other times, it is a requirement of a wrestler's on-the-job training, learning how to perform in front of a live audience while helping make the more established wrestlers look credible.

World Wrestling Entertainment (WWE) has referred to jobbers as lovable, adorable "losers". Sometimes they euphemistically use the term "local competitor".

== Historic usage ==
Jobber is a professional wrestling term used to describe a wrestler who is routinely defeated by main eventers, mid-carders, or low-carders. Most promoters do not use the term because of the negative connotation. Jobbers have been used since the 1950s, and they were popular in promotions of the United States and Canada around this time.

World Wrestling Entertainment (WWE) made greatest use of full-time jobbers during their syndicated television shows in the 1980s and early 1990s, Superstars of Wrestling, Wrestling Challenge and All-Star Wrestling. Barry Horowitz and Steve Lombardi were the wrestlers most prominently identified with this role. Other wrestlers who performed mainly as jobbers during this period included "Leaping" Lanny Poffo, Brady Boone, Tiger Chung Lee, Barry O, Reno Riggins, Duane Gill, Barry Hardy, Mick Foley, Scott Casey, Dangerous Danny Davis (also wrestling as Mr. X), The Shadows (Randy Colley and Jose Luis Rivera), Rick Hunter, Jerry Allen, Los Conquistadores (Jose Luis Rivera and José Estrada Sr.), "Iron" Mike Sharpe, Von Krus, S. D. Jones, George South, Dusty Wolfe, Mario Mancini, Tim Horner, Sonny Rogers, Brian Costello, Red Tyler, and Tom "Rocky" Stone.

Many of these wrestlers also worked matches against each other at larger venues such as Madison Square Garden and were usually more competitive against their opponents, with several of these wrestlers gaining victories. In some cases, a number of these wrestlers had main-event matches at some point, such as Sharpe receiving matches against then-WWF World Heavyweight Champion Bob Backlund or Danny Davis working in six-man tag-team matches with The Hart Foundation, usually against Tito Santana and the British Bulldogs, during the "dishonest referee" angle, before being pushed toward the bottom of the roster's hierarchy.

Others, such as Mick Foley, later became main-event wrestlers. Some were given gimmicks of their own, such as Poffo (a poet laureate as a face and as a snobbish intellectual, known as "The Genius", who also read poems as a heel) and Lombardi ("The Brooklyn Brawler", a smug, tough-talking brawler).

World Championship Wrestling (WCW), just like the WWE, made huge use of jobbers during the late 1980s and 1990s. Jobbers like Sgt. Buddy Lee Parker, Dale Veasey, George South, Bobby Walker, Joe Gomez, The Gambler, The Roadblock and Trent Knight lost the majority of their matches. However, they usually scored clean victories against other pure jobbers. Wrestlers who worked as jobbers for WWE were also employed as jobbers in WCW during this period.

The American Wrestling Association (AWA) also made moderate use of jobbers in their shows. In independent promotions jobbers rarely appear, but when they do, it is mostly in squash matches.

A jobber may not necessarily lose, only make the superstar look powerful—or at least make another wrestler interfering with the match to look more powerful. One example is Jimmy Jacobs: employed by WWE as a jobber for a time, Jacobs wrestled Eddie Guerrero during the latter's last heel run. Though Jacobs was squashed, he actually won by disqualification when Guerrero beat him with a chair. Another example of a jobber winning was when "The Kid" suddenly won an upset over Razor Ramon on the May 17, 1993, episode of Raw. He then renamed himself the "1-2-3 Kid". This win, and the Kid, were worked into Ramon's feud with Ted DiBiase, with DiBiase taunting Ramon repeatedly over losing to a nobody until he too was pinned by the Kid. On the September 20, 1993, episode of Raw, I.R.S. was pinned with a rollup by P.J. Walker thanks to Ramon's interference.

Jobbers can also get recognition on social media after appearing on a major promotion, giving them exposure they wouldn't receive otherwise. While being interviewed by Byron Saxton before his match against Braun Strowman in 2016, independent wrestler Johnny Knockout said he wanted to wrestle Strowman because "he likes big, sweaty men". The unexpected response led to Knockout eventually trending on Twitter ahead of other events on that night's Raw.

Heels and some faces used to abuse and humiliate jobbers during or after a match: Jake Roberts would allow his pet snake slither over his opponents once he pinned them; Brutus Beefcake would cut their hair off (on those sporting long hair or a mullet); Big Boss Man would cuff them to the ropes and beat them with a baton; Ted DiBiase would put them under with the Million Dollar Dream and then stuff a hundred-dollar bill in their mouths. Lex Luger, under his "Narcissist" gimmick, would make them stand up by holding them by the hair and make them look at themselves in a mirror. The Islanders would chew some fruit (usually pineapple) and then spit it over their chests, and so on.

Some jobbers, such as Barry Horowitz, Iron Mike Sharpe, the Brooklyn Brawler or the Mulkey Brothers grew to become household names to fans. Others, such as Trent Knight, Cougar Jay, Reno Riggins, Tommy Angel, Bob Emory, Ricky Nelson, Curtis Thompson, Kenny Kendall, or Eddie Jackie, were expected by fans to be squashed and even humiliated during or after a match. For example, Jake "The Snake" Roberts got Bob Emory's and Trent Knight's heads inside the sack where he kept his python snake. Dick Murdoch smashed the aforementioned Emory against a podium and then hit him with a piece of wood. Kenny Kendall got hogtied twice by Bunkhouse Buck at the end of a match, and Reno Riggins was made to put a woman's dress on.

== Jobbers ==
A slightly higher position is "jobber to the stars" (also known as a "glorified jobber"), a wrestler who defeats pure jobbers and mid-carders but consistently loses to top-level or up-and-coming stars. This happens after a main-eventer or mid-carder loses their status and is demoted to this lower level. This often happens to popular faces and sometimes heels towards the end of their careers. Many jobbers to the stars are heels who routinely defeat and humiliate face jobbers, building a reputation as capable competitors, and earning the contempt of the audience who enjoy seeing them finally defeated by popular stars, who likewise appear impressive when they win easily. Famous heel jobbers include Steve Lombardi and Barry Horowitz during the 1980s and 1990s. Triple H, a championship contender, was briefly booked as a "jobber to the stars" by WWF owner Vince McMahon in the summer of 1996 as punishment for the Madison Square Garden Incident.

On the independent wrestling circuit, including the Mexican independent circuit, star wrestlers with sufficient name recognition to draw large audiences usually traveled with their own jobber. Free from televised exposure, the star could repeatedly defeat the same opponent from town to town. Such a jobber could even be elevated to champion status, entering the ring with an impressive sounding title belt only to have it removed at the end of the match night after night.

Sometimes a jobber will prove their skill, determination, and/or loyalty to the promotion and move beyond jobber status. Curt Hennig and Eddie Gilbert, who served as high-level jobbers during their initial WWE runs, later became main-eventers. Billy Kidman initially started out as a jobber in World Championship Wrestling (WCW), before moving up the ranks to become a champion in both the WCW and WWE. Paul Roma, who began as a jobber for the WWE in the 1980s, gained enough popularity in WCW to win that promotion's Tag Team Titles with partners such as Paul Orndorff and Arn Anderson, the latter as part of the Four Horsemen. Horowitz was given a brief push by being booked to defeat Chris Candido and Sean Waltman began in WWE as a jobber to the stars until booked to defeat Scott Hall in an upset victory. The Hardy Boyz wrestled as jobbers in WWE for a few years before receiving their first push in the tag division.

Sometimes the opposite will occur, as in the case of "Iron" Mike Sharpe, who began as a normal wrestler in the independent circuit, however after joining WWE who briefly promoted him as a championship contender, he was changed to a heel jobber to be defeated by then-champion Bob Backlund. Another example is Siva Afi, a successful main-eventer/mid-carder in the independent circuit who once wrestled Ric Flair for the NWA World Heavyweight Championship, who ended up as a jobber in the WWE and other local promotions. A tag-team known as The Undertakers who were successful on the independent circuit became a jobber tag team called Double Trouble when they joined the WWE in 1992.

Sometimes, jobbing may be used as a gimmick. While in ECW, Al Snow began referring to jobbing on-screen as part of his gimmick. He subsequently formed a stable called The J.O.B. Squad, composed of prominent jobbers. In World Championship Wrestling, the tendency of the Armstrongs (particularly Brad Armstrong) to lose matches was referred to as the "Armstrong curse". On average, however, Brad Armstrong was more of a jobber to the stars. His brothers were pure jobbers for the most part, though Brian Armstrong found the greatest success of the brothers in the WWE as the Road Dogg, and even mocked WCW's 'burial' of the Armstrongs by wearing a t-shirt that said "Look Ma! No Curse!". In 2003, after returning from a neck injury, Chris Kanyon worked a jobber angle in which his gimmick was "Who's Better Than Kanyon? Nobody"; though he was booked to job to opponents on the low-tier program WWE Velocity. A particular jobber angle involved Montel Vontavious Porter (MVP), who was booked to continually lose matches during the end of 2008 – including embarrassing roll-up pinfall losses to mid-level WWE wrestlers – costing him the storyline signing bonus he received when he joined WWE.

== See also ==
- Glossary of professional wrestling terms
- Journeyman (boxing)
- Tomato can
