= Los Espantos =

Professional wrestling group

- Los Espantos wearing the distinctive black and white mask all Espantos have worn at some point in their career

Stable
- Members: Espanto I Espanto II; Espanto III; Successors
- Name(s): Los Espantos; Los Hermanos Espanto
- Debut: January 24, 1962
- Disbanded: 1979

Los Espantos (Spanish for "The Terrors"), sometimes referred to as Los Hermanos Espanto ("The Terror Brothers"), was a Mexican professional wrestling group, called a stable. The original Espantos team consisted of Espanto I (José Eusebio Vázquez Bernal) and Espanto II (Fernando Cisneros Carrillo), but later expanded to a trio when Espanto III (Miguel Vázquez Bernal), the younger brother of Espanto I, joined the group. They primarily worked as a rudo (a term used for wrestlers who portray the "bad guys") faction for Empresa Mexicana de Lucha Libre (EMLL) and on the Mexican independent circuit. As a team, Espanto I and II held the Mexican National Tag Team Championship, and Espanto II and III held the Northern Mexico Tag Team Championship. The team of Espanto I and Espanto II are considered among the best rudo teams in the history of lucha libre.

In the mid-1980s, a new generation of Espantos appeared when Espanto IV and Espanto V, both sons of Espanto III, began teaming up, and with the emergence of Espanto Jr., who was not related to any of the previous Espanto members, but was given permission to use the name. Since then, a third "wave" of Espantos have begun wrestling including Los Hijos del Espanto, who were trained by Espanto II but not related, and a new Espanto Jr., who is the son of the original Espanto Jr.

== History ==
Mexican professional wrestler José Eusebio Vázquez began working as "El Espanto" ("The Terror") in either 1958 or 1959. Months later, his childhood friend Fernando Cisneros started to wrestle, wearing the same black mask with a white cross on the face and taking the name "Espanto II", collectively known as "Los Espantos". The two soon began working for Empresa Mexicana de Lucha Libre (EMLL) in Mexico City and made their debut as a team on January 24, 1961. The duo won a tag team tournament in their debut, defeating Tony López and Kiko Córcega in the finals. The team would go on to win 34 weeks in a row on EMLL's regular Tuesday night show. Due to their success and fan reaction, Los Espantos soon started working regularly on EMLL's main show, the Friday night Super Viernes. During their run as a team, they wrestled against Lou Thesz, the visiting NWA World Heavyweight Champion, with Thesz teaming up with Blue Demon on one occasion and Huracán Ramírez on another.

In November 1962, Espanto I and II were joined by Espanto III, Espanto I's younger brother Miguel Vázquez Bernal, forming an "identical trio" where all three members wore the same mask and used basically the same ring name, only with a number to differentiate them. Outside of teaming with Espanto III, Espanto I and II also regularly teamed up with El Santo, often headlining shows across Mexico. Teaming with El Santo was part of a storyline where Espanto I and II would attack El Santo after a match, turning Santo to the tecnico side (those that portray the "good guys") in the process. On June 22, 1963, Espanto I, II and El Santo lost a match to Rito Romero, Rayo de Jalisco and Henry Pilusso. Being disappointed with the loss, Espanto II attacked El Santo, but ended up with his own mask torn up and his face covered in blood when El Santo fought back. Espanto I and II also formed a team with El Gladiador, often facing El Santo and various partners. One particularly heated match saw Los Espantos and Gladiador fight their opponents, Ray Mendoza, René Guajardo and Karloff Lagarde all the way back to the locker rooms in an era where such a thing was unheard of in Mexico.

At the first EMLL 30th Anniversary Show on September 6, Espanto II lost to Rubén Juárez in a Lucha de Apuestas ("bet match"), thus being forced to unmask. Three weeks later, on September 27, at the second EMLL 30th Anniversary Show, Espanto I defeated Rubén Juárez in a Lucha de Apuestas, forcing Juárez to have his hair shaved off. In the winter of 1963, Espanto II was forced to shave his hair off, as El Santo defeated him in a Lucha de Apuestas. A few weeks later, they followed up the storyline with El Santo unmasking Espanto I. The Los Espantos trio got their biggest win ever when they defeated the "dream team" of Mexican tecnicos El Santo, Blue Demon and Mil Máscaras. On June 12, 1964, Espanto III was unmasked after losing a Lucha de Apuestas to Huracán Ramírez. As each Espanto lost their mask and had to state their birth names, per lucha libre traditions, they claimed that their last name was "Vázquez Cisneros", combining their last names to hide the fact that they were not all related like they had claimed. In 1966, Espanto I and II won the Mexican National Tag Team Championship from El Santo and Mil Máscaras, but would later lose the belts in a rematch.

On May 30, 1968, José Vázquez, as well as fellow wrestler Popeye Franco, was killed by the owner of a cantina during a bar fight. At the time of his death, Los Espantos were set to do a world tour with dates planned for Germany, France, Spain and Japan. The promoters offered Espanto II the opportunity to go alone, but he declined due to the loss of his close friend. By the early 1970s, both Espanto II and III were semi-retired, wrestling a limited schedule in Northern Mexico. The duo held the Northern Tag Team Championship at one point, before Espanto II retired in 1979. Espanto III died on December 8, 1996, while Espanto II died on August 29, 2010.

After the storyline with El Santo, Los Espantos became one of the most reviled rudo trios in lucha libre at the time. In 1999, the Mexican newspaper El Siglo de Torreón stated that the team of Espanto I and Espanto II was considered one of the best rudo teams in the history of lucha libre. The statement was echoed by Super Luchas Magazine in 2010, when they wrote an obituary after Espanto II's death.

== Successors ==
=== Espanto IV and V ===
In 1992, the sons of Miguel Vázquez were introduced to the wrestling world as Espanto IV and Espanto V, forming a regular tag team in and around Monterrey, Nuevo León, Mexico. The duo lost their masks to the team of Blue Fish and Mongol Chino, although the team of Stuka and Stuka Jr. is also credited with unmasking them. It is possible that Espanto IV and V agreed to lose their masks to both teams, but in different locations in Mexico. Before the internet, there were examples of luchadors getting an additional payment for losing their mask on multiple occasions. The brothers have worked for various Mexican promotions and toured Japan while working for the Universal Wrestling Federation (UWF) and Michinoku Pro. In Japan, they unsuccessfully challenged The Great Sasuke and Gran Hamada for the UWA/UWF Intercontinental Tag Team Championship.

=== Los Hijos del Espanto ===
In 1993, a character known as "El Hijo del Espanto" ("The Son of Espanto") was introduced. Despite his name, he was not actually the son of any of the Espantos. He was trained by Fernando Cisneros and legally given the rights to use the "Espanto" name by Cisneros. In 2000, his older brother, who had been wrestling since 1988, took the name "El Hijo del Espanto II", as the brothers began competing as Los Hijos del Espanto.

=== The first Espanto Jr. ===
In 1984, Jesús Andrade Salas was allowed to use the name "Espanto Jr." by Miguel Vázquez, adopting the distinctive black and white mask that all Espantos wore at some point in their career. As Espanto Jr., he began working for the Universal Wrestling Association (UWA). After working under the moniker for a few years, he became embroiled in a feud with El Hijo del Santo, which mirrored the feud between El Santo and Espanto Jr.'s storyline father, Espanto I; the previous storyline was used to build interest in the matches between Espanto Jr. and El Hijo del Santo. The storyline feud between the two reached its high point when the two faced off in a Lucha de Apuestas, where both wrestlers put their mask on the line. El Hijo del Santo won, and just like Espanto I, Espanto Jr. was forced to unmask and never wear the Espanto mask again. In 1995, he became the first wrestler to portray the Pentagón character. He would later be forced to retire after being injured during a match and being clinically dead in the ring for moments before being brought back to life.

=== The second Espanto Jr. ===
In 2012, Consejo Mundial de Lucha Libre (CMLL) introduced a new Espanto Jr. as part of their Generacion 2012 group of wrestlers. In the weeks and months following the introduction of Generacion 2012, Hijo del Espanto (unclear if it was I or II) publicly stated that he and his brother were the rightful holders of the rights to the Espanto name, given to them by the only remaining, living member of the original Los Espantos, Espanto II. Hijo del Espanto demanded that Espanto Jr. changed his name, but neither the wrestler nor CMLL ever responded to the request.

=== El Espantito ===
In 1998, another wrestler was granted the rights to wear the black and white mask of Los Espantos. In this instance, they gave the rights to El Espantito ("The Little Terror"), a Mini-Estrella. In the early 2000s, he worked for AAA in their Mini division. In 2009, Espantito and Octagoncito wrestled for the vacant NWA World Midget's Championship, which Octagoncito won.

=== Unauthorized Espantos ===
In 2001, a new version of "Los Hijos del Espanto" appeared in AAA, but the characters were dropped after only a few appearances due to complaints from the original Hijos del Espanto, who held the rights to the name, according to the Mexico City Boxing and Wrestling commission. The two "impostor" Hijos del Espanto were revealed to be Sergio and César Andrade Salas, brothers of the first Espanto Jr.

== Championships and accomplishments ==
- Empresa Mexicana de Lucha Libre

- Mexican National Light Heavyweight Championship (3 times) – Espanto I
- Mexican National Tag Team Championship (1 time) – Espanto I and Espanto II

- Mexican State Championships

- Northern Tag Team Championship (1 time) – Espanto II and Espanto III

== Luchas de Apuestas record ==
Winner (wager)	Loser (wager)	Location	Event	Date	Notes
Espanto I (mask)	Mr. Atlas (mask)	Ciudad Juárez, Chihuahua	Independent Show	1962	
Espanto III (mask)	Javier Escobedo (hair)	Guadalajara, Jalisco	Independent Show	1962	
Espanto I (mask)	Cavernario Galindo (hair)	Mexico City	EMLL Show	February 9, 1962	
Espanto I (mask)	Pantera Blanca (mask)	Guadalajara, Jalisco	Independent Show	March 23, 1962	
Espanto II (mask)	Tomás Riande (hair)	Nogales, Sonora	Independent Show	June 12, 1962	
Espanto II (mask)	Álvaro Velazco (hair)	Mexico City	Independent Show	August 10, 1962	
Rubén Juárez (hair)	Espanto II (mask)	Mexico City	EMLL 30th Anniversary Show (1)	September 6, 1963	
Espanto I (mask)	Rubén Juárez (hair)	Mexico City	EMLL 30th Anniversary Show (2)	September 27, 1963	
El Santo (mask)	Espanto II (hair)	Mexico City	EMLL Show	1963	
El Santo (mask)	Espanto I mask	Mexico City	EMLL Show	October 25, 1963	
Espanto III (mask)	Alex Montaña (hair)	Tampico, Tamaulipas	Independent Show	1964	
Espanto I (hair)	Dory Dixon (hair)	Mexico City	EMLL Show	March 20, 1964	
Blue Demon (mask)	Espanto II (hair)	Monterrey	EMLL Show	June 1964	
Espanto III (mask)	Humberto Garza (hair)	Mexico City	EMLL Show	May 1, 1964	
Huracán Ramírez (mask)	Espanto III (mask)	Mexico City	EMLL Show	June 12, 1964	
Espanto I (hair)	Roger Kirby (hair)	Mexico City	EMLL Show	October 30, 1964	
Black Shadow (hair)	Espanto II (hair)	Monterrey, Nuevo León	Independent Show	November 14, 1965	
La Sombra (hair)	Espanto III (hair)	Torreón, Coahuila	Independent Show	1970s	
Black Charly (hair)	Espanto III (hair)	Torreón, Coahuila	Independent Show	1984	
