= Espanto IV and V =

Professional wrestling tag team

Tag team
- Members: Espanto IV; Espanto V
- Name(s): Los Espantos; Los Nuevo Espantos
- Debut: 1989
- Disbanded: 2001

Brothers Espanto IV and Espanto V (Spanish for "Terror 4"/"Scare 4" and "Terror 5"/"Scare 5") were a Mexican professional wrestling tag team who worked primarily as a rudo (wrestlers who portray the "bad guys") team on the Mexican independent circuit. While both brothers have been unmasked in the ring, no documentation of their birth names have been found.

They are the sons of professional wrestler Miguel Vázquez Bernal, better known as Espanto III, and adopted the Espantos name and mask eight years after their father retired from wrestling. Their uncle Jose Eusebio Vázquez was also a wrestler, better known as Espanto I, but was killed in 1968. Espanto IV retired in 2001 and Espanto V is semi-retired, working only the occasional show around his hometown of Torreon, Coahuila.

== Personal lives ==
The wrestlers known as "Espanto IV" (Spanish for "Terror 4" or "Scare 4") and Espanto V ("Terror 5"/ "Scare 5") were both born and raised in Torreon, Coahuila, Mexico, sons of Miguel Vázquez Bernal, better known by his ring name, Espanto III. As Espanto III, Vázquez was an active wrestler from the 1960s through the early 1980s. In a 1996 interview, Espanto IV revealed that their father never pushed them to become wrestlers, insisting that they learn a trade as well as train for wrestling to make sure they had options in life. Espanto IV also shared the fact that it took a lot of convincing from the brothers to allow them to be known as "Espanto IV" and "Espanto V", but the fact that Vázquez and Fernando Cisneros Carrilo (Espanto II) had given Jesús Andrade Salas permission to work as Espanto Jr. finally convinced their father to allow them to become "Espanto IV" and "Espanto V" instead of being a "Junior" or "hijo" ("son").

== Team history ==
In 1989, Espanto IV and Espanto V made their in-ring debut, both wearing the distinctive black mask with a white cross of the original Los Espantos. They soon verified that they were legitimately the sons of Espanto III, not "storyline" relatives or wrestlers who paid to use the ring name of a famous wrestler. Due to the secretive nature of masked wrestlers in Mexico, it is unclear if Espanto IV and V's 1989 debut was their "true" debut or if the brothers actually made their in-ring debut prior to 1989 using other masks and names to gain experience. The two worked regularly as a tag team in and around the Monterrey, Nuevo León, Mexico area under the names Los Espantos or Los Nuevo Espantos, and would work for the Universal Wrestling Association (UWA) among others. The brothers later toured Japan, working for the Japanese Universal Wrestling Federation (UWF) and Michinoku Pro. In Japan, they unsuccessfully challenged The Great Sasuke and Gran Hamada for the UWA/UWF Intercontinental Tag Team Championship on April 19, 1993. On May 5, they appeared at the Frontier Martial-Arts Wrestling (FMW) 4th Anniversary Show, teaming up with Super Delfin as they lost to The Great Sasuke, Kendo and Choden Senshi Battle Ranger.

On April 20, 1997, Espanto IV and Espanto V lost a Luchas de Apuestas ("bet match") to the team of Takeda and Maravilloso. As a result of the loss, they were both forced to take their mask off in the middle of the ring. While they unmasked and revealed their birth names, no record of their actual names have been found. The duo was later involved in controversy as they lost their masks twice more in Luchas de Apuestas matches, the second time to the team of Blue Fish and Mongol Chino in Monterrey, and then a third time to the brother-team of Stuka and Stuka Jr. in Gomez Palacio, Durango. Lucha libre has strong rules in place around Luchas de Apuestas matches that normally does not allow wrestlers to wear their mask again after losing such a match. In the pre-internet days wrestling, results from the independent circuit was often not reported outside of the state, allowing Espanto IV and Espanto V to lose their masks three times in a short period of time without the various wrestling commissions or fans being aware. Over time, wrestling commissions in the different states did discover the blatant violation of their rules, and the state of Nuevo Leon barred them from wrestling there for two years for the infraction.

In late 1999, Espanto IV and V both competed in a three-way Lucha de Apuestas match against Aguila Roja, with Espanto IV losing to Roja and being forced to have all his hair shaved off after the match. By 2001, Espanto IV worked less and less, either retiring from wrestling or adopting a new masked identity that has not been revealed. On December 25, 2006, Espanto V was one of eleven wrestlers who put their mask or hair on the line in a steel cage match; the other participants included Hijo del Soberano, Brillante, Ángel Azteca Jr., Moro III, Súper Leopardo, Depredador, Semental, Dorado Jr. and Máquina 27. Espanto V escaped the cage before the end of the match and kept his hair safe for the night. In 2007, Espanto V gained a small measure of revenge on behalf of Espanto IV, defeating Stuka in a Lucha de Apuestas match, which forced Stuka to be shaved bald. On September 12, 2010, Espanto V teamed up with exótico Sexy Francis for a Ruleta de la Muerte ("Roulette of Death") tournament, losing to the teams of Crazy Daisy and Dulce Paola, Pimpinela Escarlata and Sexy Libra and Sexy Piscis and V-57. Because of the loss, the two were forced to fight each other in a Lucha de Apuestas match, which Espanto V won. After the match, Sexy Francis was forced to have his hair shaved off as a result.

== Luchas de Apuestas record ==
Winner (wager)	Loser (wager)	Location	Event	Date	Notes
Takeda and Maravilloso (masks)	Espanto IV and Espanto V (masks)	Ciudad Juárez, Chihuahua	House show	April 20, 1997	
Blue Fish and Mongol Chino (masks)	Espanto IV and Espanto V (masks)	Monterrey, Nuevo Leon	House show	Unknown	
Stuka and Stuka Jr. (masks)	Espanto IV and Espanto V (masks)	Gomez Palacio, Durango	House show	Unknown	
Aguila Roja (hair)	Espanto IV (hair)	Deportivo Halcon Suriano	House show	November 21, 1999	(Note: This was a three-way match that also included Espanto V.)
Takeda and Enigma (masks)	Espanto IV and Espanto V (hair)	Ciudad Juárez, Chihuahua	House show	June 2000	
Espanto V (hair)	Stuka (hair)	Gomez Palacio, Durango	House show	2007	
Espanto V (hair)	Sexy Francis (hair)	Torreon, Coahuilo	El Homenaje a Dr. Wagner	September 12, 2010	(Note: This was the finals of a Ruleta de la Muerte tournament.)
