= Espanto I =

Mexican professional wrestler

- Vázquez wearing his full Espanto gear prior to a match.

Personal information
- Born: José Eusebio Vázquez Bernal; 1930 Torreón, Coahuila, Mexico
- Died: May 30, 1968 (aged 37–38) Monterrey, Nuevo León, Mexico
- Cause of death: Bar fight
- Family: Miguel Vázquez Bernal (brother); Espanto IV and V (nephews)

Professional wrestling career
- Ring name(s): Torbellino Vázquez; Espanto I "José Eusebio Vázquez Cisneros"
- Trained by: Carlos "Gorila" Ramos
- Debut: mid-1950s

José Eusebio Vázquez Bernal (1930 – May 30, 1968) was a Mexican professional wrestler from the mid-1950s until his death in 1968, best known under the ring name Espanto I (Spanish for "Terror I"). He was one-half of Los Espantos alongside his lifelong friend Fernando Cisneros Carrillo (Espanto II) and younger brother Miguel Vázquez Bernal (Espanto III). As Los Espantos, the three became one of the first "identical teams" in Mexico. Vázquez held the Mexican National Tag Team Championship once and the Mexican National Light Heavyweight Championship on three occasions. He lost his mask to El Santo in 1963 as a result of a long-running storyline feud between the two.

In 1968, Vázquez, along with another wrestler, was killed during a bar fight in a cantina in Monterrey, Nuevo León. Following Vázquez' death, both his brother and his best friend went into semi-retirement due to the loss. In the 1980s, other wrestlers began using the Espanto name, such as his nephews, who became Espanto IV and Espanto V, and non-family members who were allowed to use the name such as Los Hijos del Espanto ("The Sons of Espanto"), Espanto Jr., Espantito, and a second Espanto Jr. In 2010, Vázquez was inducted into the Ciudad Juárez Lucha Libre Hall of Fame, along with the other two Espantos. The team of Espanto I and Espanto II are considered among the best rudo (those that portray the bad guys) teams in the history of lucha libre.

== Early life ==
José Eusebio Vázquez Bernal was born in 1930 (exact date is unknown) in the town of Torreón, Coahuila, Mexico. His younger brother, Miguel, was born in 1940. While in school, Vázquez met and befriended Fernando Cisneros Carrillo. The friendship between the two was so strong that they considered each other brothers, and Cisneros' parents considered Vázquez as one of their own children. After leaving school, they both went their separate ways, not seeing each other for two years, before they both ended up training at the same boxing gym.

== Professional wrestling career ==
Records are unclear on exactly when Vázquez began to work as a professional wrestler, but it is known he started out in Ciudad Juárez, Chihuahua, working for local wrestling promoter Carlos "Gorila" Ramos under the name "El Torbellino Vázquez" ("Whirlwind Vázquez"). In the late 1950s, Ramos decided to give Vázquez a new ring character, creating the enmascarado ("masked wrestler") character El Espanto ("The Terror" or "The Horror"). As El Espanto, he would wear all-black and white ring gear, including a black mask with a broad, white cross on the front of the mask. A few months later, Cisnero was given the character "Espanto II" (with Vázquez becoming "Espanto I"), and thus the team of Los Hermano Espantos ("The Terror Brothers") or Los Espantos was created. Ramos recommended Espanto I to the Mexico City promoters of Empresa Mexicana de Lucha Libre ("Mexican Wrestling Enterprise"; EMLL), where he made his EMLL debut on December 16, 1959, at Arena Coliseo. While Espanto I worked in Mexico City, Espanto II gained more experience locally before being called up to Mexico City as well.

Los Hermanos Espantos made their debut as a team on January 24, 1961, winning a tag team tournament by defeating Tony López and Kiko Córcega in the finals. They would remain undefeated for 34 weeks in a row on EMLL's regular Tuesday night show. Due to their success and fan reaction, Los Espantos soon started working regularly on EMLL's main Friday night show, Super Viernes. They wrestled against visiting NWA World Heavyweight Champion Lou Thesz, with Thesz teaming up with Blue Demon on one occasion and Huracán Ramírez on another. In early 1962, Espanto I won his first ever Lucha de Apuestas ("bet match"), defeating Mr. Atlas and forcing him to unmask. The Lucha de Apuestas match is the most prestigious match type in lucha libre, especially when winning the mask of an opponent. On February 9, Espanto I defeated Cavernario Galindo in a Lucha de Apuestas, forcing his maskless opponent to have his hair shaved off. While Galindo's career was waning at the time, the victory was still considered a major accomplishment in Espanto I's young career. The following month, Espanto I unmasked Pantera Blanca ("The White Panther").

In November, Espanto I and II were joined by Espanto III, Eusebio's younger brother Miguel, forming a regular trio. Outside of teaming with Espanto III, Espanto I and II also regularly teamed up with El Santo, often headlining shows across Mexico. Teaming with El Santo was part of a storyline where Espanto I and II would attack El Santo after a match, turning Santo to the tecnico side (those that portray the "good guys") in the process. On June 22, 1963, Espanto I, II and El Santo lost a match to Rito Romero, Rayo de Jalisco and Henry Pilusso. Disappointed with the loss, Espanto II attacked El Santo, but ended up with his own mask torn up and his face covered in blood when El Santo fought back. At the first EMLL 30th Anniversary show on September 6, Espanto II lost a Lucha de Apuestas to Rubén Juárez, being forced to unmask; this made him the first Espanto to lose his mask. Three weeks later, at the second EMLL 30th Anniversary show on September 27, Espanto I defeated Juárez in a Lucha de Apuestas that forced Juárez to have his hair shaved off. The victory was part of the build towards a mask versus mask match with El Santo. The two headlined a sold out show in Arena México, where El Santo defeated Espanto I, forcing him to unmask. After his unmasking, he gave his name as "José Eusebio Vázquez Cisnero", much like Espanto II, who had stated that his birth name was "Fernando Vázquez Cisnero", keeping the storyline relationship between the two intact. When Espanto III lost his mask, he likewise stated that his last name was "Vázquez Cisnero".

The Los Espantos trio got their biggest win ever when they defeated the "dream team" of Mexican tecnicos El Santo, Blue Demon and Mil Máscaras. During that time period, Los Espantos also formed a team with El Gladiador, often facing El Santo and various partners. One particularly heated match saw Los Espantos and El Gladiador fight their opponents, Los Rebeldes (Ray Mendoza, René Guajardo and Karloff Lagarde), all the way back to the locker rooms, which occurred in an era where such a thing was unheard of in Mexico. On September 14, Espanto I defeated Juárez to win the Mexican National Light Heavyweight Championship, one of the oldest championships in existence, but lost it to Mendoza in November as part of a long-running rudo vs. rudo storyline between Los Espantos and Los Rebeldes. On October 30, 1964, Espanto I defeated Roger Kirby in a Lucha de Apuestas, forcing Kirby to have his bleach blonde hair shaved off. In 1965, he became the Mexican National Light Heavyweight Champion once more, defeating Alfonso Dantés. Later that year, he would successfully defend the title against Mil Máscaras at the EMLL 32nd Anniversary Show, EMLL's biggest show of the year, on September 24. On October 14, 1966, his second reign as the Mexican National Light Heavyweight Champion came to an end when he lost to El Santo. That same year, Espanto I and II won the Mexican National Tag Team Championship from El Santo and Mil Máscaras, but would later lose the belts in a rematch. Espanto I became a three-time Mexican National Light Heavyweight Champion in March 1967, holding it for three months before Mil Máscaras won the championship.

== Death and legacy ==
On May 30, 1968, after a wrestling show in Monterrey, Nuevo León, Vázquez and fellow wrestler Popeye Franco were killed by a cantina owner during a fight. Records are unclear if Eusebio Vázquez had any children, but it is clear that the wrestler who later worked as Espanto Jr. and claimed to be the son of Eusebio Vázquez was not related at all. That Espanto Jr., Jesús Andrade Salas, was allowed to use the name by Espanto II. Later on, other Espantos would follow in the footsteps of the character that Eusebio Vázquez created, including his nephews Espanto IV and V, Los Hijos del Espanto, Espantito, and a new Espanto Jr., son of the original Espanto.

After the storyline with El Santo, Los Espantos became one of the most reviled rudo trios in Lucha libre at the time. In 1999, the Mexican newspaper El Siglo de Torreón stated that the team of Espanto I and Espanto II was considered one of the best rudo teams in the history of lucha libre. The statement was echoed by SuperLuchas Magazine in 2010, when they wrote an obituary after Espanto II died.

== Championships and accomplishments ==
- Empresa Mexicana de Lucha Libre

- Mexican National Light Heavyweight Championship (3 times)
- Mexican National Tag Team Championship (1 time) – with Espanto II

- Chihuahua State wrestling

- Ciudad Juárez Lucha Libre Hall of Fame (2010)

== Luchas de Apuestas record ==
| Winner (wager) | Loser (wager) | Location | Event | Date | Notes |
|---|---|---|---|---|---|
| Espanto I (mask) | Mr. Atlas (mask) | Ciudad Juárez, Chihuahua | Independent Show | 1962 | |
| Espanto I (mask) | Cavernario Galindo (hair) | Mexico City | EMLL Show | February 9, 1962 | |
| Espanto I (mask) | Pantera Blanca (mask) | Guadalajara, Jalisco | Independent Show | March 23, 1962 | |
| Espanto I (mask) | Rubén Juárez (hair) | Mexico City | EMLL 30th Anniversary Show | September 27, 1963 | |
| El Santo (mask) | Espanto I (mask) | Mexico City | EMLL Show | October 25, 1963 | |
| Espanto I (hair) | Dory Dixon (hair) | Mexico City | EMLL Show | March 20, 1964 | |
| Espanto I (hair) | Roger Kirby (hair) | Mexico City | EMLL Show | October 30, 1964 | |

== See also ==
- List of premature professional wrestling deaths
