= Randy Mulkey =

American professional wrestler (born 1964)

Personal information
- Born: May 31, 1964 (age 62) Anderson, South Carolina, U.S.

Professional wrestling career
- Ring name: Randy Mulkey
- Debut: 1985
- Retired: 2016

Randy Mulkey (born May 31, 1964) is a retired American professional wrestler as a jobber to the stars who worked for Jim Crockett Promotions, World Championship Wrestling and the World Wrestling Federation the late 1980s.

== Professional wrestling career ==
In 1985, Mulkey made his professional wrestling debut in the Mid-Atlantic for Jim Crockett Promotions. During most of his career, he teamed up with his brother Bill. Known for their bleached blonde mullets, pale complexion, unathletic bodies, and purple trunks. They were on a losing streak of 0–180.

On March 28, 1987, that all changed when the Mulkeys won an upset victory over The Gladiators (Gladiator #1 and Gladiator #2) to qualify for the Jim Crockett Memorial Cup 1987 tournament. This happened when one of the Gladiators was about to bodyslam, bringing one of the Mulkeys back to the ring. The other Mulkey shuck up behind the Gladiator by tripping and pinning for the 1–2–3. It was considered "Mulkey Mania". They lost in the first round of the Jim Crockett Memorial Cup 1987 to Denny Brown and Todd Champion.

In 1987, they also worked in Florida.

In November 1988, Ted Turner bought Jim Crockett Promotions and renamed it World Championship Wrestling. The brothers went their separate ways with Randy teaming with various jobbers and Bill working in other promotions. They reunited in 1990 working for the World Wrestling Federation. They retired, and had separate careers.

On August 11, 2007, the brothers reunited for a one night appearance at a NWA Legends Show, defeating George South and his son George Jr. in Charlotte.

Randy returned to the ring for one last time at WrestleCade 2016, in a battle royal won by George South.

== Personal life ==
After retiring from wrestling in 1990, Mulkey worked in construction and later owned a trucking company for nearly eight years. Later he worked for an independent trucking company.

In 2012, Randy and Bill were inducted into the South Carolina Pro Wrestling Hall Of Fame.
