= La Parkita =

Mexican professional wrestler (1975–2009)

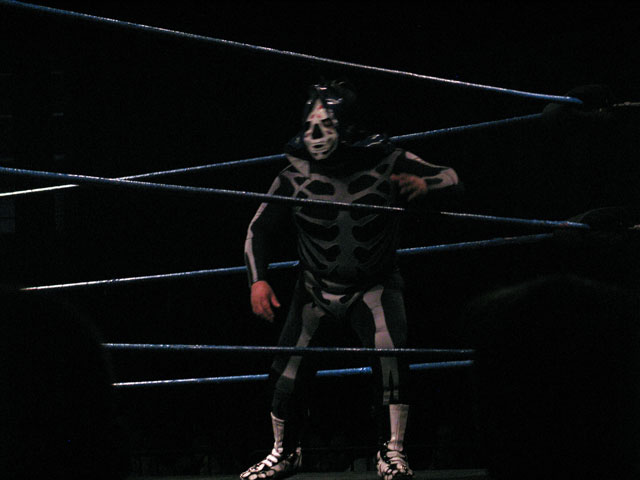
- La Parkita at a Chikara show in August 2007.

Personal information
- Born: Alberto Pérez Jiménez; May 15, 1975 Tetla de la Solidaridad, Tlaxcala, Mexico
- Died: June 29, 2009 (aged 34) Mexico City, Mexico
- Family: Alejandro (twin brother), Mario, 2 brothers

Professional wrestling career
- Ring name(s): Gemelito Diablo; La Parkita; Mini Fresbee; Mini Nova; Ninjita de Fuego; Octagoncito; Payasito/Coquito Amarillo; Voladorcito
- Billed height: 1.45 m (4 ft 9 in)
- Billed weight: 60 kg (130 lb)
- Trained by: Espectrito
- Debut: 1990

Alberto Pérez Jiménez (May 15, 1975 – June 29, 2009) was a Mexican professional wrestler, who worked in the Mini-Estrella division from 1990 until his death in 2009. He was best known under the ring name La Parkita, having used the name in Asistencia Asesoría y Administración (AAA), the Mexican Independent circuit and Chikara in the United States. His older brother Mario and twin brother Alejandro also wrestled under the names Espectrito and Espectrito II respectively. On June 29, 2009, both twins were killed by prostitutes in Mexico City.

== Professional wrestling career ==
After being trained by his older brother Mario, who wrestles as Espectrito, Alberto made his professional wrestling debut in 1990 as a Mini-Estrella named Gemelito Diablo. Working in the Mini division does not necessarily mean that Alberto is a dwarf as several short wrestlers work in the "Mini" division. Later on he wrestled as Voladorcito, a mini version of the wrestler Volador and even briefly wore the outfit of Octagoncito when the original Octagoncito was unable to wrestle.

In 1992 Consejo Mundial de Lucha Libre's (CMLL) head booker Antonio Peña left the promotion to create his own promotion, Asistencia Asesoría y Administración (AAA). In CMLL Peña had been instrumental in the creation of the Mini-Estrellas division and immediately started a Minis division in AAA as well, consisting of several CMLL Minis and a crew of new Minis signed on AAA's creation. One of these signees was Alberto Pérez Jiménez, through the recommendation of his brother Mario Pérez Jiménez who worked for AAA at the time. Jiménez was given the gimmick of La Parkita, a Mascota (Miniature version) of the popular wrestler La Parka, complete with a skeleton mask and body suit. Later on Alberto began doing double duty, working some nights as La Parkita and other nights as Payasito Amarillo, forming a trio with Payasito Rojo and Payasito Azul to form the trio Los Payasitos a mini version of the rudo (bad guy or heel) trio of clowns called Los Payasos. On June 10, La Parkita was one of the 13 Minis who participated in the main event of Triplemanía III-A, a multi-man Luchas de Apuestas, or bet match, where each participant put their mask on the line. La Parkita managed to save his mask while Payasito Rojo was unmasked after the match. Eight days later La Parkita was on the losing side of an eight-mini match at Triplemanía III-B; the match saw the team of Torerito, Super Muñequito, Octagoncito and Mascarita Sagrada defeat La Parkita, Espectrito I, Espectrito II and Fuercita Guerrera. A year later the Jiménez brothers lost to Máscarita Sagráda, Jr., Super Muñequito and Mini Frisbee at Triplemanía IV-C.

Alberto left AAA, being fired for missing too many shows. Peña gave the La Parkita to another wrestler but Alberto kept working as La Parkita on the Mexican Independent circuit, although he never regularly worked for one single promotion after leaving AAA.

== Personal life ==
Alberto Pérez Jiménez was the twin brother of Alejandro Pérez Jiménez who was best known under the ring name Espectrito II or Espectro, Jr. Alberto and Alejandro's older brother Mario Pérez Jiménez was also a wrestler known primarily as Espectrito.

== Death ==
Alberto Pérez Jiménez along with his twin brother Alejandro (also a professional midget wrestler under the name of Espectrito II), were found murdered on June 29, 2009. It was reported that the two brothers checked into a hotel after a Sunday night show. Allegedly, two female prostitutes approached the wrestlers and were invited back to their hotel room. There the two women spiked the men's drinks with what was believed to be eye drops mixed with alcohol. The drinks were intended to knock the men out, but they died instead, perhaps due to their small stature. The prostitutes were allegedly part of a group called La Filtracion. On July 22, 2009, it was reported that the Mexican police had arrested one of the two women suspected in the death of the Pérez Jiménez twins. Police traced the whereabouts of the woman by tracking one of the Pérez Jiménez' twins cell phones which she used. The woman admitted to going to the hotel room with the Pérez Jiménez twins but denied being involved in their death. On August 12, 2009, Mexican police tracked down the second suspect in Hidalgo and arrested her. She admitted to being at the crime scene but maintained that it was her accomplice who administered the drugs that killed the Pérez Jiménez twins. The two women were later found guilty and, on July 12, 2010, sentenced to 47 years in prison.

The story of the Jiménez twins' murder was the subject of an episode of Tabloid with Jerry Springer that shows a dramatized version of the events including an interview with their mother Maria Elena Jiménez and brother Juan Jiménez. The episode revealed that Alberto was starting to become involved with local politics, but did not reveal any actual links between their death and Alberto's political aspirations.

== Not to be confused with ==
While Alberto Pérez Jiménez was the first wrestler to use the "La Parkita" ring character at least two other wrestlers have used the name in AAA after Alberto left the promotion.

- La Parkita II – The wrestler that took over after Jiménez, currently wrestles as the second version of Octagoncito
- La Parkita III – The current version of La Parkita, having played the part since 1997

== See also ==
- List of premature professional wrestling deaths
