= Rocky Columbo =

American professional wrestler (1928–1964)

Personal information
- Born: Rocco John Colombo; 22 September 1928 Bronx, New York, U.S.
- Died: 5 March 1964 (aged 35) Spokane, Washington

Professional wrestling career
- Ring name(s): Rocky Columbo; Rocco Columbo
- Billed height: 5 ft 8 in (173 cm)
- Billed weight: 225 lb (102 kg)
- Debut: 1948

Rocco John Colombo (September 22, 1928 – March 5, 1954), professionally known as Rocky Columbo, was an American professional wrestler. Becker was active in the 1950s to the early 1960s.

== Professional wrestling career ==
Colombo his professional wrestling debut in 1948. He won the NWA Brass Knuckles Championship in Texas in 1956. Colombo also worked in Quebec and Northern Ontario. In 1961, he made his debut for Pacific Northwest Wrestling. In 1963, Colombo made his debut for Stampede Wrestling in Calgary.

Colombo died on March 5, 1964, from a drug overdose in a hotel room in Spokane, Washington.

== Championships and accomplishments ==
- Midwest Wrestling Association
  - Ohio Tag Team Championship (1 time) - with Billy Darnell
- Pacific Northwest Wrestling
  - Pacific Coast Junior Heavyweight Championship (1 time)
- Southwest Sports, Inc.
  - NWA Brass Knuckles Championship (Texas version) (1 time)
