= Espanto Jr. =

Mexican professional wrestler

Personal information
- Born: Jesús Andrade Salas; May 11, 1956 (age 70) Gomez Palacio, Durango, Mexico

Professional wrestling career
- Ring name(s): Chuy Andrade; Negro Andrade; El Moro II; Espanto Jr. El Santo Negro; Pentagón
- Billed height: 1.71 m (5 ft 7 1/2 in)
- Billed weight: 80 kg (176 lb)
- Trained by: El Moro; El Noble; Halcón Suriano
- Debut: 1971
- Retired: January 1996

Espanto Jr. is the most recognizable ring name of Jesús Andrade Salas (born May 11, 1956), a retired Mexican professional wrestler. Over his 25-year-long career, Andrade worked under a number of different aliases, most importantly as Espanto Jr. ("Terror Jr."), later on as El Santo Negro ("The Black Saint"), and as the first person to work as Pentagón. Andrade was forced to retire from wrestling after suffering a life-threatening injury during a match that briefly left him clinically dead before being revived in the middle of the ring.

Andrade is part of an extensive wrestling family started by his father, who worked as "El Moro" and is referred to as the "Moro Family". His son currently works for Consejo Mundial de Lucha Libre (CMLL), using Andrade's most famous moniker, Espanto Jr. His nephew worked for CMLL for almost a decade under the name La Sombra, and worked for WWE under the name Andrade.

== Personal life ==
Jesús Andrade Salas is the son of professional wrestler El Moro (Spanish for "The Moor"), who trained Andrade and at least five of his brothers for their professional wrestling careers. Several of his brothers are or have been professional wrestlers. His older brother, José Andrade Salas, is best known under the ring name "Brilliante". Two of his brothers are only known publicly under their ring names: Moro III and Zafiro/Pentagoncito. Another brother, Juan Andrade Salas, has also wrestled under the name "Zafiro" at one point in his career. Jesús' younger brother, Juan Andrade Salas, has worked under a variety of ring names, including "Kevin", "Radioactivo" and "El Pollo Asesino". Jesús' son is also a professional wrestler, working as the enmascarado (masked) character Espanto Jr., and since he has never been unmasked, his full name has not been revealed. His nephew is former Consejo Mundial de Lucha Libre (CMLL) headliner La Sombra, son of José Andrade.

== Professional wrestling career ==
Andrade made his professional wrestling debut in 1971 using the ring name "El Moro II", and at times even worked as "El Moro" like his father. He would later use names such as Chuy Andrade and Negro Andrade as he worked on the Mexican independent circuit.

=== Espanto Jr. (1984–1995) ===
In 1984, Andrade adopted his most well known ring character: the masked "Espanto Jr." (Spanish for "Horror Jr."), who was a storyline son of Espanto I. Espanto I had died in 1968 without any sons, so Andrade was given permission to use the name by the surviving Los Espantos, Espanto II and Espanto III. He began wrestling wearing the distinctive black and white mask of the Los Espantos team (that also encompassed Espanto IV and V) as he began working for the Universal Wrestling Association (UWA). After working under the moniker for a few years, he became embroiled in a storyline feud with El Hijo del Santo, mirroring the feud of Hijo del Santo's father El Santo and Espanto Jr.'s storyline father Espanto I. The feud between the two reached one of its highlights as the two wrestlers faced off in a Lucha de Apuestas ("bet match"), where both wrestlers put their mask on the line. El Hijo del Santo won, mirroring the victory of El Santo; just like Espanto I, Espanto Jr. was forced to unmask and never wear the Espanto mask again for the rest of his wrestling career. As part of the escalating storyline between the two, Espanto Jr. defeated El Hijo del Santo to win the UWA World Lightweight Championship on July 26, 1987, a title he would hold until May 1, 1988, when El Hijo del Santo regained the championship.

The storyline between the two stretched over several years, with El Hijo del Santo winning Lucha de Apuestas matches over Espanto on three occasions, each time forcing Espanto Jr. to have his hair shared off. Espanto Jr. would later lose a similar Luchas de Apuestas match to Super Muñeco on June 2, 1991. On April 14, 1992, Espanto Jr. defeated El Hijo del Santo to win the UWA World Welterweight Championship, but only held it for 41 days before losing it to Celestial. He would subsequently work for World Wrestling Association (WWA) as the UWA began attracting fewer spectators and eventually went out of business. In WWA, he won the WWA World Welterweight Championship by defeating Piloto Suicida; he held it for 193 days until losing the title to El Hijo del Santo. He also won the WWA World Lightweight Championship by defeating El Hijo del Black Shadow. In 1994, Espanto Jr. began working for Lucha Libre AAA World Wide (AAA), which had been founded a year before. At Triplemanía II-C on May 27, he teamed with Rambo and Magnate to defeat Winners, Super Caló and El Solar, who Espanto Jr. pinned.

=== Santo Negro (1995) ===
In 1995, AAA owner Antonio Peña came up with the idea to create an "evil twin" to one of the most popular wrestlers of the time and Andrade's long time in-ring rival, El Hijo del Santo. Peña picked Andrade to play the part of El Santo Negro (literally "the Black Saint"), giving him a mask and outfit design that mirrored El Hijo del Santo, with the only difference being that it was primarily black with silver accents, while El Hijo del Santo's was primarily silver with black accents. The concept only lasted a few months as El Santo's family objected to the infringement of the trademarked look of El Santo and Hijo del Santo.

=== Pentagón (1995–1996) ===
Trying to build on the popularity of AAA wrestler Octagón, Peña used the "evil counterpart" concept here instead, turning Andrade into Pentagón, the mirror opposite of Octagón. Initially, the two faced off in six-man or eight-man tag team matches as a way to build tension for singles matches further along the storyline. Their first encounter came at Triplemania III-A on June 10, 1995, where Octagón teamed with Konnan, Perro Aguayo and La Parka to defeat Pentagón, Cien Caras, Máscara Año 2000 and Jerry Estrada, although without Pentagón and Octagón being involved in the finish of the match. One week later, at Triplemania III-A, Octagón, El Hijo del Santo, Rey Misterio Jr. and La Parka defeated Pentagón, Blue Panther, Psicosis and Fuerza Guerrera. Octagón and Pentagón were not involved in the finish of the match, but faced off several times in the ring to further the storyline.

In early 1996, Andrade suffered an injury during a match with La Parka, when a move caused him to land wrong. The impact left him momentarily clinically dead in the middle of the ring before being brought back to life. The injury, coupled with his age, effectively forced Andrade to retire from wrestling. Since the Pentagón character wore a mask to cover his entire face, it was decided to give the character to another wrestler who then became Pentagón; it was never officially stated that it was a different wrestler under the mask now.

=== Retirement ===
Following his retirement, Andrade began focusing on the El Moro wrestling school, along with several of his brothers.

== Championships and accomplishments ==
- Universal Wrestling Association
  - UWA World Lightweight Championship (1 time)
  - UWA World Welterweight Championship (1 time)
- World Wrestling Association
  - WWA World Lightweight Championship (1 time)
  - WWA World Welterweight Championship (1 time)

== Luchas de Apuestas record ==
Winner (wager)	Loser (wager)	Location	Event	Date	Notes
Espanto Jr. (mask)	Dr. Hoo (mask)	Monterrey, Nuevo León	live event	February 3, 1985	
El Hijo del Santo (mask)	Espanto Jr. (mask)	Monterrey, Nuevo León	live event	August 31, 1986	
El Hijo del Santo (mask)	Espanto Jr. (hair)	Torreón, Coahuila	live event	August 2, 1987	
El Hijo del Santo (mask)	Espanto Jr. (hair)	Monterrey, Nuevo León	live event	May 8, 1988	
El Hijo del Santo (mask)	Espanto Jr. (hair)	Naucalpan, State of Mexico	live event	September 17, 1989	
Super Muñeco (mask)	Espanto Jr. (hair)	Torreón, Coahuila	live event	June 2, 1991	
