= Blue Demon =

Mexican professional wrestler and actor

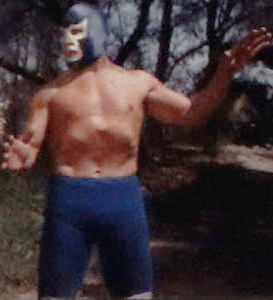
- Blue Demon in Blue Demon y las invasoras (1969)
- Born: Alejandro Muñoz Moreno; October 12, 1922; García, Nuevo León, Mexico
- Died: December 16, 2000 (aged 78); Mexico City, Mexico
- Burial place: Parque Memorial Gayosso; Naucalpan de Juárez
- Spouse: Gregoria Moreno
- Children: Blue Demon Jr. (adopted)
- Professional wrestling career
- Ring names: Tosco Muñoz; Blue Demon ("Demonio Azul")
- Billed height: 1.69 m (5 ft 7 in)
- Billed weight: 77 kg (170 lb)
- Trained by: Rolando Vera
- Debut: March 31, 1948
- Retired: August 27, 1989

Alejandro Muñoz Moreno (October 12, 1922 – December 16, 2000), better known by the ring name Blue Demon (Demonio Azul in Spanish), was a Mexican film actor and professional wrestler. Blue Demon is considered a legend of professional wrestling in Mexico, partially from starring in a series of Lucha films between 1961 and 1979, often alongside in-ring rival El Santo. His in-ring career began in 1948 and stretched for 41 years until his retirement in 1989.

Throughout his career Muñoz never lost a Lucha de Apuestas match and retired without exposing his face to the public; he would later be buried in his signature blue and silver mask. In his 41-year career he won the NWA World Welterweight Championship twice, the Mexican National Welterweight Championship three times and the Mexican National Tag Team Championship with long time tag team partner Black Shadow. He also won the hair of Cavernario Galindo and the masks of Espectro II, Matemático, and most notably, the mask of Rayo de Jalisco.

Near the end of his career Muñoz introduced Blue Demon Jr. to the wrestling world, who despite being promoted as the son of Blue Demon, did not actually share a blood connection to Muñoz; he was later claimed to be the "adopted son". Muñoz's actual son owns the trademarks to the name "Blue Demon", while Blue Demon Jr. owns the trademark to the "Blue Demon Jr." name. Consejo Mundial de Lucha Libre (CMLL) honors the legacy of Blue Demon by holding the Leyenda de Azul ("The Blue Legend") tournament at irregular intervals. He was chosen for the Wrestling Observer Newsletter Hall of Fame by Dave Meltzer in 1996 as part of the inaugural HOF selection.

== Early life ==
Alejandro Muñoz Moreno was born October 12, 1922, in García, Nuevo León, Mexico. He was the child of farmers and was the fifth of twelve children. At a young age, Alejandro dropped out of school and moved to Monterrey, where his uncle gave him a job working on the National Railroad. His co-workers gave him the nickname 'Manotas', referring to his large, powerful hands.

== Professional wrestling career ==
A chance meeting with the famous Mexican wrestler Rolando Vera piqued his interest in Lucha Libre, Vera even offering to tutor him and help him start a career. He began wrestling without a mask in Laredo, Texas. His first match was against Chema Lopez on March 12, 1948. Adopting the mask and persona of The Blue Demon, he headed back to Mexico to start a full-time in-ring career. His first appearance as The Blue Demon was in Mexico City in September 1948, where he fought Benny Arcilla. Blue Demon began his career in the ring as a rudo (a bad guy). From there, he formed a tag team with another masked luchador named The Black Shadow, and the two became known as Los Hermanos Shadow (The Shadow Brothers).

In 1952, the famous wrestler El Santo beat and unmasked Black Shadow in the ring, which triggered Blue's decision to become a técnico (a good guy) in the ring, and a legendary feud between Blue Demon and El Santo was started. The storyline feud between the two culminated with Blue Demon defeating El Santo in a well-publicized series of matches in 1952 and 1953. In 1953, Blue won the NWA World Welterweight Championship from Santo, and held it until 1958. Their rivalry never entirely abated in later years (although they co-starred in a number of Mexican horror films) since Santo always remembered his defeat at the Blue Demon's hands. During the 1960s, one of Blue Demon's rivals was el Rayo de Jalisco. In 1988, the year he retired, Blue Demon defeated Jalisco in a mask vs. mask match, taking the mask of another of Mexico's wrestling legends. Blue Demon retired from the ring in 1989, aged 67, at the Monterrey Arena, where he appeared in a final match, teaming up with his adoptive son, Blue Demon Jr.

== Acting career ==
Blue Demon first appeared in cameos in a couple of luchador films released in 1961–1962, "The Killers of Lucha Libre" and "Fury in the Ring", in which he was one of several wrestlers more or less in the background. But in 1964, Enrique Vergara, the producer of the then-successful Santo movies, decided to diversify by allowing the 42-year-old Blue Demon to star in a series of luchador films of his own. The plots of the Blue Demon films are thought to be extremely similar to those of Santo's films. Santo was asking for a salary increase at the time and Vergara wanted to cultivate a second movie star. From 1964 to 1979, Blue Demon starred in a total of 25 action/horror/science fiction films. Of those 25 films, Santo co-starred with him in nine of them. In three of his films, Blue Demon starred as the leader of a squadron of masked superheroes known as Los Campeones Justicieros (The Champions of Justice). Membership in the Champions included such legendary Mexican wrestling figures as Blue Demon, Mil Máscaras, Tinieblas, Rayo de Jalisco, El Médico Asesino, El Fantasma Blanco, El Avispon Escarlata and Superzan. In 1989, Blue Demon was the subject of a feature-length Mexican documentary entitled Blue Demon, the Champion (1989).

== Death ==
Muñoz died just before noon on Saturday, December 16, 2000. He suffered a fatal heart attack on a park bench near a subway kiosk while on his way home from his regular morning training session at The Blue Demon Instituto Atletico, where he was teaching others his fighting skills. Although an attempt was made to get him to a hospital, he was unable to be revived. He was 78 years old. Blue Demon was buried wearing his trademark blue mask, which was never removed in public as he always kept his true identity a secret.

== Legacy ==
Blue Demon is considered one of the biggest legends of lucha libre second only to El Santo in terms of popularity and influence both in and outside of Mexico. The distinctive blue and silver mask of Blue Demon and Blue Demon Jr. is known worldwide and is an instantly recognizable symbol of Lucha Libre. On Wikipedia, The mask icon is used as part of some professional wrestling related tags and notices. (Note: Displayed above is the Wikipedia Icon featuring Blue Demon's mask.) On October 27, 2000, CMLL held their first ever Leyenda de Azul ("The Blue Legend") tournament in honor of Blue Demon. The winner of the tournament receives a championship belt that features Blue Demon as well as a plaque with a Blue Demon mask on it. The tournament has been held on a semi-regular basis ever since, The tournament was first endorsed by Blue Demon Jr., and later endorsed by Muñoz' son. Alfredo Muñoz, after Blue Demon Jr. stopped working for CMLL.

In 2002, Blue Demon was ranked at 28 of the greatest professional wrestler of all time in the book The Top 100 Wrestlers of All Time by John Molinaro, edited by Dave Meltzer and Jeff Marek.

Starting in November 2015 Televisa and Sony Pictures Television began airing the first season of the Blue Demon television series featuring a fictionalized version of the early days of his career in the ring and personal life. The third season of the series debuted on April 14, 2017, bringing the episode count to 65. The show debuted in the US in 2017 on UniMás. In 2018, Blue Demon Jr. announced that his son was training for a wrestling career and would be known as "Blue Demon III", hoping to have his son continue the legacy started by Blue Demon.

== Championships and accomplishments ==
- Empresa Mexicana de Lucha Libre
  - Mexican National Tag Team Championship (1 time) – with Black Shadow
  - Mexican National Welterweight Championship (3 times)
  - NWA World Welterweight Championship (2 times)
  - Homenaje a Dos Leyendas honoree (2019)
- Lucha Libre AAA Worldwide
  - AAA Hall of Fame (2022)
- Wrestling Observer Newsletter
  - Wrestling Observer Newsletter Hall of Fame (Class of 1996)

== Luchas de Apuestas record ==
| Winner (wager) | Loser (wager) | Location | Event | Date | Notes |
|---|---|---|---|---|---|
| Blue Demon (mask) | Jorge Allende (hair) | N/A | Live event | N/A | |
| Blue Demon (mask) | Moloch (mask) | Monterrey, Nuevo León | Live event | N/A | |
| Blue Demon (mask) | Baby Olson (hair) | N/A | Live event | N/A | |
| Blue Demon (mask) | Tony Borne (hair) | N/A | Live event | November 27, 1953 | |
| Blue Demon (mask) | Cavernario Galindo (hair) | N/A | Live event | March 12, 1954 | |
| Blue Demon (mask) | Conde Giuseppe Daidone (beard) | Mexico City | Live event | March 12, 1955 | |
| Blue Demon (mask) | Espanto II (hair) | Monterrey, Nuevo León | EMLL Show | June 1964 | |
| Blue Demon (mask) | Espectro II (mask) | Tijuana, Baja California | Live event | December 3, 1971 | |
| Blue Demon (mask) | Máquina Salvaje (mask) | Mexico City | Live event | December 2, 1979 | |
| Blue Demon (mask) | Rayo de Jalisco (mask) | Monterrey, Nuevo León | Live event | July 30, 1989 | |
| Blue Demon (mask) | Matemático (mask) | Monterrey, Nuevo León | Live event | August 27, 1989 | |
| Blue Demon (mask) | Matemático (hair) | Mexico City | Live event | September 6, 1989 | (Note: Triangle match that also included Rayo de Jalisco) |

== Filmography ==
| Year | Original title | English title | Role | Notes |
|---|---|---|---|---|
| 1961 | La Furia del Ring | The Fury of the Ring | Himself | |
| 1962 | Asesinos de la Lucha Libre | Wrestling Assassins | Himself | |
| 1965 | Demonio Azul | Blue Demon | Himself | |
| 1966 | Blue Demon vs. el Poder Satánico | Blue Demon vs. the Satanic Power | Himself | |
| 1968 | La Sombra del Murciélago | The Shadow of the Bat | Himself | |
| 1968 | Arañas Infernales | Infernal Spiders | Himself | Final black and white film |
| 1968 | Blue Demon Contra Cerebros Infernales | Blue Demon vs. The Infernal Brains | Himself | First color film |
| 1968 | Blue Demon Contra las Diabólicas | Blue Demon vs. The Diabolical Women | Himself | |
| 1968 | Blue Demon: Destructor de Espías | Blue Demon: Destroyer of Spies | Himself | |
| 1968 | Pasaporte a la Muerte | Passport to Death | Himself | |
| 1969 | Blue Demon y las Invasoras | Blue Demon and the Invaders | Himself | |
| 1970 | Santo Contra Blue Demon en la Atlántida | Santo vs. Blue Demon in Atlantis | Himself | |
| 1970 | Santo y Blue Demon Contra los Monstruos | Santo and Blue Demon vs. the Monsters | Himself | |
| 1970 | Santo y Blue Demon en el Mundo del los Muertos | Santo and Blue Demon in the World of the Dead | El Caballero Azul (The Blue Knight) | |
| 1971 | Los Campeones Justicieros | The Champions of Justice | Himself | |
| 1972 | Vuelven los Campeones Justicieros | The Champions of Justice Return | Himself | |
| 1972 | Las Momias de Guanajuato | The Mummies of Guanajuato | Himself | |
| 1973 | Blue Demon y Zovek en La Invasión de los Muertos | Blue Demon and Zovek in the Invasion of the Dead | Himself | |
| 1973 | Santo y Blue Demon contra Drácula y el Hombre Lobo | Santo and Blue Demon vs. Dracula and the Wolfman | Himself | |
| 1973 | Las Bestias del Terror | The Beasts of Terror | Himself | |
| 1974 | El Triunfo de los Campeones Justicieros | Triumph of the Champions of Justice | Himself | |
| 1974 | Santo y Blue Demon Contra el Doctor Frankenstein | Santo and Blue Demon vs. Dr. Frankenstein | Himself | |
| 1975 | Noche de Muerte | Night of Death | Himself | |
| 1975 | La Mafia Amarilla | The Yellow Mafia | Himself | |
| 1976 | El Hijo de Alma Grande | The Son of Alma Grande | Himself | |
| 1977 | La Mansion de las 7 Momias | The Mansion of the Seven Mummies | Himself | |
| 1979 | Misterio en las Bermudas | Mystery in Bermuda | Himself | |
| 1989 | Blue Demon, el Campeón | Blue Demon, The Champion | Himself | Documentary, direct-to-video |
