= Espanto Jr. (CMLL) =

Mexican professional wrestler (born 1986)

Personal information
- Born: March 26, 1986 (age 40) Gómez Palacio, Durango, Mexico
- Family: Jesús Andrade Salas (father) the Andrade wrestling family

Professional wrestling career
- Ring name(s): Moro Jr. El Hijo del Pentagón; Espanto Jr.
- Billed height: 1.73 m (5 ft 8 in)
- Billed weight: 90 kg (198 lb)
- Trained by: Espanto Jr. El Hijo del Gladiador
- Debut: October 2001

Espanto Jr. (born March 26, 1986) is a Mexican professional wrestler signed to Consejo Mundial de Lucha Libre (CMLL), where he is a member of the La Ola Negra stable. He portrays a rudo ("bad guy") wrestling character. Espanto Jr.'s real name is not a matter of public record, as is often the case with masked wrestlers in Mexico, where their private lives are kept a secret from the wrestling fans.

He is the son of the original Espanto Jr., Jesús Andrade Salas, and is a part of an extensive wrestling family that started with his grandfather Jose Andrade, better known as "El Moro". At least nine of his uncles are professional wrestlers, including his cousin, Manuel Andrade, best known as Andrade. Espanto Jr. made his professional wrestling debut in 2001 at the age of only 15, originally working under the ring name "Moro Jr." after his grandfather, later taking the name "Hijo del Pentagón" after his father, who portrayed the original Pentagón. In CMLL, he is a one-time CMLL Arena Coliseo Tag Team Champion with Akuma.

== Personal life ==
Espanto Jr. was born on March 28, 1986, in Gómez Palacio, Durango, Mexico. In his country, as part of the wrestling style called lucha libre, it is traditional to preserve the privacy of any masked wrestler unless they are unmasked. Due to this secrecy, Espanto Jr.'s birth name is not common knowledge and traditionally not something Mexican news sources would report on. It has been revealed that his paternal last name is "Andrade", as he has publicly stated that he is the son of professional wrestler Jesús Andrade Salas, who was the first wrestler to use the ring name Espanto Jr. Jesús Andrade also worked as Pentagón and Santo Negro during his career.

He is the grandson of El Moro (Spanish for "The Moor") and has at least nine uncles that are or were involved with professional wrestling over the years. The most well known second-generation Andrade brother are three that worked as Lo Gemelos del Ring ("The Gems of the Ring") – Brilliante (Jose Andrade Salasa), Zafiro (who was also the original Pentagoncito) and Diamante (Sergio Andrade Salas, also known as "Moro III"). Other Andrade brothers have played the part of Zafiro (Juan Andrade Salas, now known as "Espirtu Magico") and Diamante (César Andrade Salas, better known as Kevin, Radioactivo, El Pollo and El Pollo Asesino). Sergi Andrade Salas is another uncle who, at one point, was a professional wrestler, having briefly worked as "Hijo del Espectro"; it is unclear if he is still wrestling or retired. Manuel Andrade worked for a while as El Fúnebre. In interviews, the Andrade family has indicated that at least two other Andrade brothers are involved with wrestling, but did not clearly identify who they were. His cousin Manuel Alfonso Andrade Oropeza, the son of Jose Andrade, worked under the ring name La Sombra from 2007 until 2015.

Growing up as part of a professional wrestling family, the future Espanto Jr. decided he wanted to follow in the footsteps of his father and grandfather at an early age. In a 2010 interview, he recalled how he would be in the front row watching his father wrestle from the time he could walk. In 1996, his father suffered an injury during a match and was briefly clinically dead while in the ring until he was revived. While the injury left a big impression on the then-10 year old, he later accepted that it was an accident and tried not to think about it, but did comment that his mother still worried about him every time he competed.

== Professional wrestling career ==
=== Early career (2001–2012) ===
Espanto Jr. made his debut in October or November 2001, wearing a mask and using the ring name "El Moro Jr." a tribute to his grandfather. Initially, he worked in the Andrade family owned Arena Olimpico Laguna in Gómez Palacio, Durango, while still developing his wrestling skills. Early in his career, Moro Jr. teamed up with Espanto V on multiple occasions, a name that would later become more significant in his career. In 2005, he was one of ten wrestlers participating in the first ever Copa Moro in honor of his grandfather. Moro Jr. teamed up with Oso Negro, Latino Junior, Psycho and his uncle Zafiroto, taking on the team of Brillante Junior, Cadete de la Atlántida I, Cadete de la Atlántida II, Espacial and Tigre Chong in an elimination match.

In 2008, Moro Jr. became involved in a storyline feud with local exótico wrestler Sexy Psicis. After several matches between the two, they both agreed to put their hair on the line in a Lucha de Apuestas ("bet match"). Moro Jr. was masked, but for this specific match, he put his hair on the line. Sexy Psicis won the match, forcing Moro Jr. to remove his mask enough to have his hair shaved off afterwards. The match between the two was described as "the best match of the night" by the El Siglo del Torreon newspaper. After the match, Moro Jr. put out a challenge against Sexy Psicis, where he would put his mask on the line. In early 2009, Moro Jr. worked a four-way feud against Kato Kung Lee Jr., Galaxy and Radioactivo, leading to a four-way Lucha de Apuestas where all four wrestlers put their masks on the line. On February 28, Moro Jr. pinned Radioactivo to win his first Lucha de Apuestas. After the match, Radioactivo was unmasked and revealed that he was César Andrade Salas, Moro Jr.'s uncle. Also in 2009, Moro Jr. changed his ring character, adopting the name "El Hijo del Pentagón", playing off the fact that his father portrayed the original Pentagón late in his career. He remained primarily in Gómez Palacio, Durango for the next few years, out of the national spotlight.

=== Consejo Mundia de Lucha Libre (2012–present) ===
==== Early years (2012–2021) ====
In 2012, Consejo Mundial de Lucha Libre (CMLL) introduced their Generacion 2012 ("Generation 2012"), essentially the 2012 "graduating class" from CMLL's wrestling school. The group included Oro Jr. Herodes Jr., Taurus, Genesis, Guerrero Negro Jr. and Akuma, as well as Espanto Jr., who wore the distinctive black and white mask of the Los Espantos team. Espanto Jr. was later revealed to be the son of the original Espanto Jr., who had used the ring name from 1984 until 1994. In the weeks and months following his introduction, "Hijo del Espanto" (literally "The Son of Espanto") publicly stated that he was the rightful holder of the rights to the Espanto name, given to him by the only remaining, living member of the original Los Espantos, Espanto II. Hijo del Espanto demanded that Espanto Jr. changed his name, but neither the wrestler nor CMLL ever responded to the request. CMLL never commented on the claim of El Hijo del Espanto, nor did they modify Espanto Jr.'s name or mask design. El Hijo del Espanto had successfully prevented AAA from promoting a different team as "Los Hijos del Espanto", who in fact were uncles of Espanto Jr., Sergio and César Andrade Salas. While the claim was successful in 2001, the Mexico City boxing and wrestling commission did not block CMLL's usage of the name "Espanto Jr.", as CMLL continued to promote Espanto Jr., even after the claim by El Hijo del Espanto.

Prior to his in-ring debut, sports website MedioTiempo described Espanto Jr. as having "a good look and better wrestling skills" based on what they had seen of him before becoming Espanto Jr. Espanto Jr. made his CMLL in-ring debut on September 18, at their main venue, Arena México, where he and fellow Generacion 2012 member Herodoes Jr. lost to Bengala and Oro Jr. Espanto Jr.'s first high level exposure came in February 2013, where he was one of 20 participants in the Torneo Sangre Nueva ("New Blood Tournament"), a tournament specifically designed to bring attention to the young, low-ranked wrestlers of the promotion. He participated in qualifying block A on February 26, where he was one of 10 wrestlers in the torneo cibernetico, multi-man elimination match alongside Akuma, Camaleón, Cholo, Herodes Jr., Hombre Bala Jr., Höruz, Stigma, Soberano Jr. and Boby Zavala. He was eliminated by Hombre Bala Jr. as the fifth man eliminated overall. Block winner Soberano Jr. wound up winning the entire tournament. In late March, Espanto Jr. was announced as one of the novatos ("rookies") in the Torneo Gran Alternativa ("Great Alternative Tournament"), which paired a rookie with an experienced wrestler for a tag team tournament. Espanto Jr. was paired with veteran wrestler Mr. Niebla and competed in Block B on the April 19 Super Viernes. The team defeated Camaleón and Brazo de Plata in the first round, but lost to eventual tournament winners Bobby Zavala and Rey Escorpión in the second round. The following year, Espanto Jr. and Mephisto competed in that year's Torneo Gran Alternativa, but lost to Soberano Jr. and Volador Jr. in the first round on January 31, 2014.

On January 5, 2016, Espanto Jr. was one of sixteen wrestlers competing in CMLL's annual La Copa Junior ("The Junior Cup") tournament, which showcased only second and third-generation wrestlers. He competed in Block B alongside Canelo Casas, Esfinge, The Panther, Sansón, Soberano Jr., Super Halcón Jr. and Tiger, but was the second man eliminated by Super Halcón Jr. In the first round of the Torneo Gran Alternativa on June 2, 2017, he and Kraneo were defeated by Sansón and Último Guerrero. Espanto Jr. was paired with Arkangel de la Muerte in a tournament for the CMLL Arena Coliseo Tag Team Championship, but lost to Disturbio and Virus in the first round on March 3, 2018. Two months later, he and Hechicero were disqualified in the first round of the Torneo Gran Alternativa against Electrico and Místico. At the Blue Panther 40th Anniversary Show on October 19, he was the first wrestler eliminated in the Copa Halcón Suriano ("Halcón Suriano Cup") tournament. On October 11, 2019, Espanto Jr. fared significantly better in that year's Torneo Gran Alternativa with Bárbaro Cavernario, defeating Ángel de Oro and Sonic in the first round and Súper Astro Jr. and Titán in the quarter-finals, before losing to Star Jr. and Valiente in the semi-finals.

==== La Ola Negra (2021–present) ====
Espanto Jr. and fellow Generacion 2012 member Akuma began teaming under the name La Ola Negra ("The Black Wave") in August 2021. At the CMLL 88th Anniversary Show on September 24, they won a poll to face Atrapasuenos ("Dreamcatchers"; Espiritu Negro and Rey Cometa) for the Mexican National Tag Team Championship, but failed to win the title. In February 2022, the team became a stable when they were joined by Dark Magic. The following month, Espanto Jr. and Akuma participated in a tournament for the vacant CMLL Arena Coliseo Tag Team Championship, defeating Esfinge and Guerrero Maya Jr. in the quarter-finals and Atrapasuenos in the semi-finals, before losing to Hombre Bala Jr. and Robin in the finals on April 2. A long running storyline between Espanto Jr. and Akuma and Atrapasuenos culminated in a hair vs. hair Lucha de Apuestas on July 14, 2023, where Espanto Jr. and Akuma were victorious, keeping their hair safe while Cometa and Negro had theirs shaved off in the process. On August 18, they unsuccessfully challenged Los Depredadores ("The Predators"; Magnus and Rugido) for the Mexican National Tag Team Championship.

On October 7, Espanto Jr. and Akuma defeated Furia Roja and Guerrero de la Muerte to win the CMLL Arena Coliseo Tag Team Championship, their first titles in CMLL, but lost it to La Dinastía Imperial ("The Imperial Dynasty"; El Hijo del Villano III and Villano III Jr.) on April 6, 2024. On October 29, Espanto Jr. was the first wrestler eliminated by Zandokan Jr. in the semi-final torneo cibernetico of the Rey del Inframundo ("King of the Underworld") tournament. He competed in the semi-finals of the La Copa Junior VIP on May 22, 2026, but was the second wrestler eliminated by Atlantis Jr., one of the eventual co-winners.

== Championships and accomplishments ==
- Consejo Mundial de Lucha Libre

- CMLL Arena Coliseo Tag Team Championship – with Akuma (1 time)

- Mexican independent circuit

- Laguna Extreme Championship (1 time)

== Luchas de Apuestas record ==
Winner (wager)	Loser (wager)	Location	Event	Date	Notes
Sexy Psicis (hair)	Moro Jr. (hair)	Gómez Palacio, Durango	Live event	November 20, 2008	(Note: This was a Lucha del reves match where the masked Moro Jr. risked his hair against the unmasked Sexy Psicis.)
Moro Jr. (mask)	Radioactivo (mask)	Gómez Palacio, Durango	Live event	February 28, 2009	(Note: This was a four-way match that also included Kato Kung Lee Jr. and Galaxy.)
La Ola Negra (hair) (Espanto Jr. and Akuma)	Atrapasuenos (hair) (Espíritu Negro and Rey Cometa)	Mexico City	Festejando El 40. Aniversario De Atlantis	July 14, 2023	
