= Espanto II =

Mexican professional wrestler

- Carillo, as Espanto II, after he was unmasked.

Personal information
- Born: Fernando Cisneros Carrillo; August 25, 1932 Torreón, Coahuila, Mexico
- Died: August 27, 2010 (aged 78)
- Spouse: Paula Reyes Cisnero
- Children: Five sons
- Family: Domingo Edgardo Cisneros Díaz de Castro (father); Isabel Carrillo Iñiguez (mother)

Professional wrestling career
- Ring name(s): La Furia; Toro Cisneros; Espanto II "Fernando Vázquez Cisneros"
- Billed height: 1.64 m (5 ft 5 in)
- Billed weight: 97 Kg
- Trained by: Maciste; Joe Marín; El Buitre
- Debut: 1952
- Retired: 1979

Fernando Cisneros Carrillo (August 25, 1932 – August 27, 2010) was a Mexican professional wrestler known under the ring name Espanto II ("Terror 2"). For most of his career, he was closely associated with his tag team partner and close friend José Vázquez, better known as Espanto I, as well as Miguel Vázquez, known as Espanto III, with the three collectively known as Los Espantos. Carillo held the Mexican National Tag Team Championship with Espanto I and the Northern Tag Team Championship with Espanto III. He lost his mask to Rubén Juárez in 1963 in a Lucha de Apuestas ("bet match").

In 2010, Carrillo was inducted into the Ciudad Juárez Lucha Libre Hall of Fame, along with the other two Espantos. The team of Espanto I and Espanto II are considered among the best rudo (those that portray the bad guys) teams in the history of professional wrestling in Mexico.

== Early life ==
Fernando Cisneros Carrillo was born on August 25, 1932, son of Edgardo Cisneros Díaz Isabel Carrillo Iñiguez in the Lagunero town of Torreón, Coahuila, Mexico. While in school, Cisneros met and befriended José Eusebio Vázquez Bernal, forming a friendship so close that they considered each other brothers; Cisneros' parents also considered Vázquez as one of their own children. After leaving school, they both went their separate ways, not seeing each other for two years, before they both ended up training at the same boxing gym, where Cisnero was met with some success as a Golden Gloves boxer. Cisnero was also an avid cyclist, having participated in the first ever Vuelta Coahuila bicycle race. Later in life, he credited training as a boxer and cyclist for his stamina in the ring.

== Professional wrestling career ==
Initially, he had been trained for Olympic style wrestling and Greco-Roman wrestling by a Torreó-based wrestler known as Machist. In 1952, Cisnero made his debut as a luchador in San Pedro, Coahuila, after training with wrestler El Buitre. He began as an enmascarado ("masked wrestler") known as "La Furia" ("the Fury"). In his debut match, Cisnero teamed with La Hiena Enmascarada in a loss to Pokarito Ramírez and Ventarrón, earning five Mexican pesos afterwards. He would later adopt a new ring name, "Toro" Cisnero, and began teaming with Torbellino Vázquez, his childhood friend Eusebio Vázquez, who had become a luchador as well.

In the late 1950s, Vázquez adopted a new masked ring character, El Espanto ("The Terror" or "The Horror"), donning all-black and white ring gear, including a black mask with a broad, white cross on the front of the mask. A few months later, Cisnero was given the character "Espanto II" (with Vázquez becoming "Espanto I"), and thus the team of Los Hermano Espantos ("The Terror Brothers"), or Los Espantos, was created. Ramos recommended Espanto I to the Mexico City promoters of Empresa Mexicana de Lucha Libre ("Mexican Wrestling Enterprise"; EMLL), where he made his EMLL debut on December 16, 1959, at Arena Coliseo. While Espanto I worked in Mexico City, Espanto II gained more experience locally before being called up to Mexico City as well. Los Hermanos Espantos made their debut as a team on January 24, 1961, winning a tag team tournament by defeating Tony López and Kiko Córcega in the finals. They would remain undefeated for 34 weeks in a row on EMLL's regular Tuesday night show. Due to their success and fan reaction, Los Espantos soon started working regularly on EMLL's main Friday night show, Super Viernes. They wrestled against visiting NWA World Heavyweight Champion Lou Thesz, with Thesz teaming up with Blue Demon on one occasion and Huracán Ramírez on another.

On June 12, 1962, Espanto II won his first ever Lucha de Apuestas ("bet match"), defeating Tomás Riande and forcing him to be shaved bald as a result. In lucha libre, the Lucha de Apuesta victory is considered the highest "prize" that a wrestler can win, more so than championships. Two months later, he won the hair of Álvaro Velazco. Those two Apuesta matches were part of a buildup towards one of the feature matches of the 1st EMLL 30th Anniversary Show, held on September 6, 1963. Rubén Juárez defeated Espanto II in a Lucha de Apuesta, forcing Espanto to unmask. After unmasking, he gave his birth name as "Fernando Vázquez Cisneros", using a combination of his and his partners' paternal last names to maintain the story that the Espantos were brothers. A few weeks later, on September 27, Espanto I gained a measure of revenge for his team, defeating Juárez as part of the 2nd EMLL 30th Anniversary Show. In November 1962, Espanto I and II were joined by Espanto III, Eusebio's younger brother Miguel, forming a regular trio. They also regularly teamed up with El Santo, often headlining shows across Mexico. Teaming with El Santo was part of a storyline where Espanto I and II would attack El Santo after a match, turning Santo to the tecnico side (those that portray the "good guys") in the process. On June 22, 1963, Espanto I, II and El Santo lost a match to Rito Romero, Rayo de Jalisco and Henry Pilusso. Disappointed with the loss, Espanto II attacked El Santo, but ended up with his own mask torn up and his face covered in blood when El Santo fought back. In the buildup to the mask vs. mask match between Espanto I and El Santo, El Santo defeated Espanto II in a Lucha de Apuestas in late 1963, forcing Espanto II to have all his hair shaved off. Months later, El Santo unmasked Espanto I, who also stated that his last name was "Vázquez Cisneros".

The Los Espantos trio got their biggest win when they defeated the "dream team" of Mexican tecnicos El Santo, Blue Demon and Mil Máscaras, sparking a long-running rivalry between the two trios. During that time period, Los Espantos also formed a team with El Gladiador, often facing El Santo and various partners. One particularly heated match saw Los Espantos and El Gladiador fight their opponents, Los Rebeldes (Ray Mendoza, René Guajardo and Karloff Lagarde), all the way back to the locker rooms, which occurred in an era where such a thing was unheard of in Mexico. In June 1964, Blue Demon defeated Espanto II in a Lucha de Apuestas, leaving him bald as a result. The following year, Espanto II lost his hair to Blue Demon's long time tag team partner, Black Shadow. In 1966, Espanto I and II won the Mexican National Tag Team Championship from El Santo and Mil Máscaras, but would later lose the belts in a rematch. On May 30, 1968, José Vázquez, as well as fellow wrestler Popeye Franco, were killed by the owner of a cantina during a bar fight. At the time of his death, Los Espantos were set to do a world tour with dates planned for Germany, France, Spain and Japan. The promoters offered Espanto II the opportunity to go alone or with Espanto III, but he declined due to the loss of his close friend. After the death of his brother, Miguel wrestled less regularly, and by the early 1970s, both Cisneros and Miguel Vázquez became semi-retired from wrestling, working only a limited schedule in Northern Mexico. As Espanto II and III, the duo held the Northern Tag Team Championship at one point in the 1970s, before Espanto II retired in 1979.

== Retirement and death ==
Cisnero wrestled his last match in 1979, losing to Gran Hamada in Monterrey, Nuevo León, before retiring from in-ring competition. He did remain involved with professional wrestling, training several local Torreón wrestlers, including Stuka Jr. Cisnero gave two of his students permission to become Los Hijos del Espanto ("The Sons of Espanto"), using the name and masks. In 1998, Cisneros, as the last surviving Espanto, endorsed the Mini-Estrella El Espantito ("The Little Terror") to use the name and mask, having trained him years earlier.

Cisnero was married to Paula Reyes Cisnero, and together they had five sons and sixteen grandchildren. Late in life Cisnero suffered from heart problems and had undergone surgery days prior to August 27, 2010. In the morning of the 27th, he suffered a relapse and was brought back to the hospital, but died shortly after.

== Legacy ==
After the storyline with El Santo, Los Espantos became one of the most reviled rudo trios in Lucha libre at the time. In 1999, the Mexican newspaper El Siglo de Torreón stated that the team of Espanto I and Espanto II was considered one of the best rudo teams in the history of lucha libre. The statement was echoed by Súper Luchas Magazine in 2010, when they wrote an obituary after Espanto II died. The Los Espantos trio influenced several subsequent teams and individual wrestlers to use the Espanto name, not just limited to his sons Espanto IV and V. In 1984, Vázquez and Cisneros allowed Jesús Andrade Salas to adopt the identify of "Espanto Jr.", who was presented as the son of Espanto I and wore the signature black and white mask of Los Espantos. Andrade would be succeeded by his son, who in 2012, also began working as Espanto Jr.

== Championships and accomplishments ==
- Empresa Mexicana de Lucha Libre

- Mexican National Tag Team Championship (1 time) – with Espanto I

- Chihuahua State wrestling

- Northern Tag Team Championship (1 time) – with Espanto III
- Ciudad Juárez Lucha Libre Hall of Fame (2010)

== Luchas de Apuestas record ==
Winner (wager)	Loser (wager)	Location	Event	Date	Notes
Espanto II (mask)	Tomás Riande (hair)	Nogales, Sonora	Independent Show	June 12, 1962	
Espanto II (mask)	Álvaro Velazco (hair)	Mexico City	Independent Show	August 10, 1962	
Rubén Juárez (hair)	Espanto II (mask)	Mexico City	EMLL 30th Anniversary Show	September 6, 1963	
El Santo (mask)	Espanto II (hair)	Mexico City	EMLL Show	1963	
Blue Demon (mask)	Espanto II (hair)	Monterrey	EMLL Show	June 1964	
Black Shadow (hair)	Espanto II (hair)	Monterrey, Nuevo León	Independent Show	November 14, 1965	
