= Juicio Final (1989) =

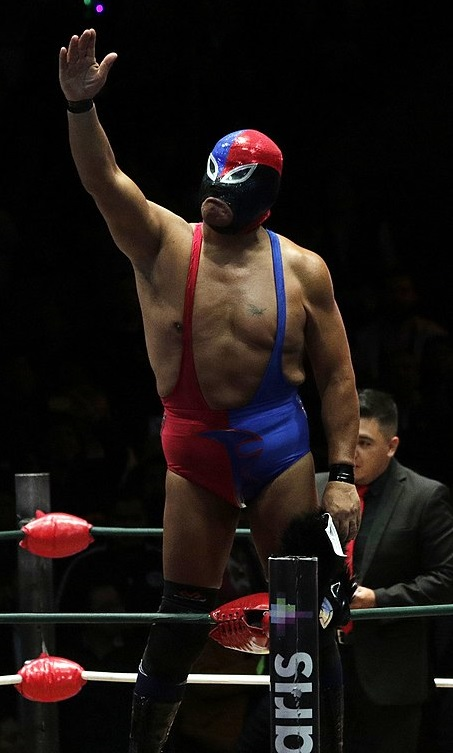
- Fuerza Guerrera (in 2018), won the mask of Rocky Star on the first of two Juicio Final shows in 1989.
- Promotion: Consejo Mundial de Lucha Libre
- Date: December 1, 1989; December 8, 1989
- City: Mexico City, Mexico
- Venue: Arena México

Event chronology
← Previous; EMLL 56th Anniversary Show	Next → EMLL 57th Anniversary Show

Juicio Final chronology
← Previous; 1988	Next → 1990

Juicio Final (1989) (Spanish for "Final Judgement" 1989) was a professional wrestling supercard show produced by Empresa Mexicana de Lucha Libre (EMLL), which took place on December 1 and December 8, 1989 in Arena México, Mexico City, Mexico. The shows served as the year-end finale for EMLL before Arena México, EMLL's main venue, closed down for the winter for renovations and to host Circo Atayde . The shows replaced the regular Super Viernes ("Super Friday") shows held by EMLL since the mid-1930s. Records indicate that 1989 was the first year that EMLL used the name "Jucio Final" for their show, a name they would use on a regular basis going forward.

The main event of the show was a Luchas de Apuestas, or bet match, which is considered a higher profile match type than a championship match in Lucha Libre. The main event of the December 1 Juicio Final show was a Relevos Suicidas ("Suicide Relay") tag team match where All Star and El Hijo del Santo defeated Fuerza Guerrera and Rocky Star. As a result of their loss, Fuerza Guerrera and Rocky Star had to wrestle for their masks, which Fuerza Guerra won, forcing Rocky Star to unmask and reveal his real name, Federico Ramírez Ibarra, per lucha libre traditions. The other featured match on the show saw El Dandy successfully defend the Mexican National Middleweight Championship against Emilio Charles Jr. two falls to one. The December 1st show included three additional matches.

Three main event competitors who survived the December 1 show with their masks intact had to face off in the main event of the December 8 Juicio Final. Fuerza Guerra, El Hijo del Santo and All Star competed in individual matches against each other, where the first wrestler to win two matches would not have to put his mask on the line. With victories over both Hijo del Santo and All Star, Fuerza Guerra watches as El Hijo del Santo then pinned All Star in the last match of the night. After the loss All Star unmasked and revealed his real name, Cesar Antonio Amezcua Muñoz, as a result of his loss. In the second match of the night US wrestler Fabuloso Blondy defeated Pirata Morgan to win the NWA World Light Heavyweight Championship. The December 8 show featured one additional match.

== Production ==
=== Background ===
For decades Arena México, the main venue of the Mexican professional wrestling promotion Consejo Mundial de Lucha Libre (CMLL), would close down in early December and remain closed into either January or February to allow for renovations as well as letting Circo Atayde occupy the space over the holidays. As a result CMLL usually held a "end of the year" supercard show on the first or second Friday of December in lieu of their normal Super Viernes show. 1955 was the first year where CMLL used the name "El Juicio Final" ("The Final Judgement") for their year-end supershow. Until 2000 the Jucio Final name was always used for the year end show, but since 2000 has at times been used for shows outside of December. It is no longer an annually recurring show, but instead held intermittently sometimes several years apart and not always in the same month of the year either. All Juicio Final shows have been held in Arena México in Mexico City, Mexico which is CMLL's main venue, its "home".

=== Storylines ===
The 1989 Juicio Final show featured five professional wrestling matches scripted by EMLL with some wrestlers involved in scripted feuds. The wrestlers portray either heels (referred to as rudos in Mexico, those that play the part of the "bad guys") or faces (técnicos in Mexico, the "good guy" characters) as they perform.

== Results December 1, 1989 ==
No.	Results	Stipulations
1	Los Xavieres (Americo Rocca and Javier Cruz) defeated Los Destructores (Tony Arce and Vulcano)	Tag
2	Atlantis, El Faraón and Máscara Sagrada defeated Brazo de Oro and Los Infernales (Masakre and MS-1	Best two-out-of-three falls six-man tag team match
3	Los Bucaneros (Hombre Bala, Pirata Morgan and Verdugo) defeated Brazo de Plata, El Brazo, and Fabuloso Blondy	Best two-out-of-three falls six-man tag team match
4	El Dandy (c) defeated Emilio Charles Jr.	Best two-out-of-three falls match for the Mexican National Middleweight Championship
5	All Star and El Hijo del Santo defeated Fuerza Guerrera and Rocky Star	Relevos Suicidas tag team match
6	Fuerza Guerrera defeated Rocky Star	Best two-out-of-three falls Lucha de Apuestas, mask vs. mask match
(c) / – the champion(s) heading into the match

== Results December 8, 1989 ==
No.	Results	Stipulations
1	Los Brazos (Brazo de Oro, Brazo de Plata and El Brazo) defeated El Faraón, Rayo de Jalisco Jr., and Ringo Mendoza	Best two-out-of-three falls six-man tag team match
2	Fabuloso Blondy defeated Pirata Morgan (c)	Best two-out-of-three falls match for the NWA World Light Heavyweight Championship
3	Fuerza Guerrera defeated El Hijo del Santo	Three-way Luchas de Apuestas qualifier match
4	Fuerza Guerrera defeated All Star	Three-way Luchas de Apuestas qualifier match
5	El Hijo del Santo defeated All Star	Best two-out-three falls Lucha de Apuestas, mask vs. mask match
(c) / – the champion(s) heading into the match
