= Juicio Final (1988) =

Mexican professional wrestling show

- Promotion: Empresa Mexicana de Lucha Libre
- Date: December 9, 1988
- City: Mexico City, Mexico
- Venue: Arena México
- Attendance: 14,000

Event chronology
← Previous; EMLL 55th Anniversary Show	Next →: 33. Aniversario de Arena México

Juicio Final chronology
← Previous; 1987	Next → 1989

Juicio Final (1988) (Spanish for "Final Judgement" 1988) was a professional wrestling supercard show, scripted and produced by Consejo Mundial de Lucha Libre (CMLL), which took place on December 9, 1988, in Arena México, Mexico City, Mexico. The show served as the year-end finale for CMLL before Arena México, CMLL's main venue, closed down for the winter for renovations and to host Circo Atayde . The shows replaced the regular Super Viernes ("Super Friday") shows held by CMLL since the mid-1930s.

The main event of the 1988 Juicio Final show featured Lizmark defeating Fabuloso Blondy to win the NWA World Light Heavyweight Championship, ending Fabuloso Blondy's reign at 168 days. The show was also billed as the farewell show for Ignacio Gómez Ruiz, known under the ring name "El Nazi" as he was retiring due to injuries. In the semi-main event Lola González defeated Pantera Sureña in a Lucha de Apuestas, hair vs. hair match, forcing Pantera to have her hair shaved off as a result. The show featured six additional matches.

== Production ==
=== Background ===
For decades Arena México, the main venue of the Mexican professional wrestling promotion Consejo Mundial de Lucha Libre (CMLL), would close down in early December and remain closed into either January or February to allow for renovations as well as letting Circo Atayde occupy the space over the holidays. As a result CMLL usually held a "end of the year" supercard show on the first or second Friday of December in lieu of their normal Super Viernes show. 1955 was the first year where CMLL used the name "El Juicio Final" ("The Final Judgement") for their year-end supershow. It is no longer an annually recurring show, but instead held intermittently sometimes several years apart and not always in the same month of the year either. All Juicio Final shows have been held in Arena México in Mexico City, Mexico which is CMLL's main venue, its "home".

=== Storylines ===
The 1988 Juicio Final show featured six professional wrestling matches scripted by CMLL with some wrestlers involved in scripted feuds. The wrestlers portray either heels (referred to as rudos in Mexico, those that play the part of the "bad guys") or faces (técnicos in Mexico, the "good guy" characters) as they perform.

== Results ==
No.	Results	Stipulations
1	Pegaso and Thunder defeated Bestia Salvaje and Guerrero Negro	Tag team match
2	Astro de Oro, Huracán Ramírez, and Javier Cruz vs. Babe Face, Blue Panther, and El Hijo del Gladiador ended in a draw	Best two-out-of-three falls six-man tag team match
3	Atlantis, El Dandy, and El Texano defeated Fuerza Guerrera and Los Hermanos Dinamita (Cien Caras and Mascara Ano 2000)	Best two-out-of-three falls six-man tag team match
4	Rayo de Jalisco Jr., Popitekus, and Villano III defeated Los Infernales (El Satánico and Masakre) and Gigante Masther	Best two-out-of-three falls six-man tag team match
5	Lola González defeated Pantera Sureña	Best two-out-of-three falls Lucha de Apuestas, hair vs. hair match
6	Lizmark defeated Fabuloso Blondy (c)	Singles match for the NWA World Light Heavyweight Championship
(c) / – the champion(s) heading into the match
