= EMLL 55th Anniversary Show =

Mexican Professional wrestling show

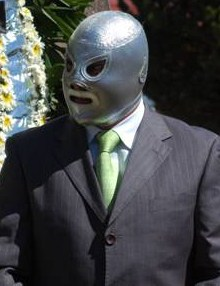
- El Hijo del Santo, challenged for the Mexican National Welterweight Championship
- Promotion: Empresa Mexicana de Lucha Libre
- Date: September 30, 1988
- City: Mexico City, Mexico
- Venue: Arena México
- Attendance: 17,000

Event chronology
← Previous; Juicio Final	Next → Juicio Final

EMLL Anniversary Show chronology
← Previous; 54th Anniversary	Next → 56th Anniversary

The EMLL 55th Anniversary Show (Spanish: 55. Aniversario de EMLL) was a professional wrestling major show event produced by Empresa Mexicana de Lucha Libre (EMLL) that took place on September 30, 1988, in Arena Mexico, Mexico City, Mexico. The event commemorated the 55th anniversary of CMLL, which would become the oldest professional wrestling promotion in the world. The Anniversary show is EMLL's biggest show of the year, their Super Bowl event. The EMLL Anniversary Show series is the longest-running annual professional wrestling show, starting in 1934.

The main event of the show was a Lucha de Apuestas ("Bet match) where both Máscara Año 2000 and Mogur wagered their masks on the outcome of the match, with the loser being forced to take off his mask at the end of the show. Mogur had unmasked As Charro at the previous year's anniversary show and put his mask on the line once again. The show also featured a match for the NWA World Light Heavyweight Championship and a match for the Mexican National Welterweight Championship as well as an undetermined number of other matches.

== Production ==
=== Background ===
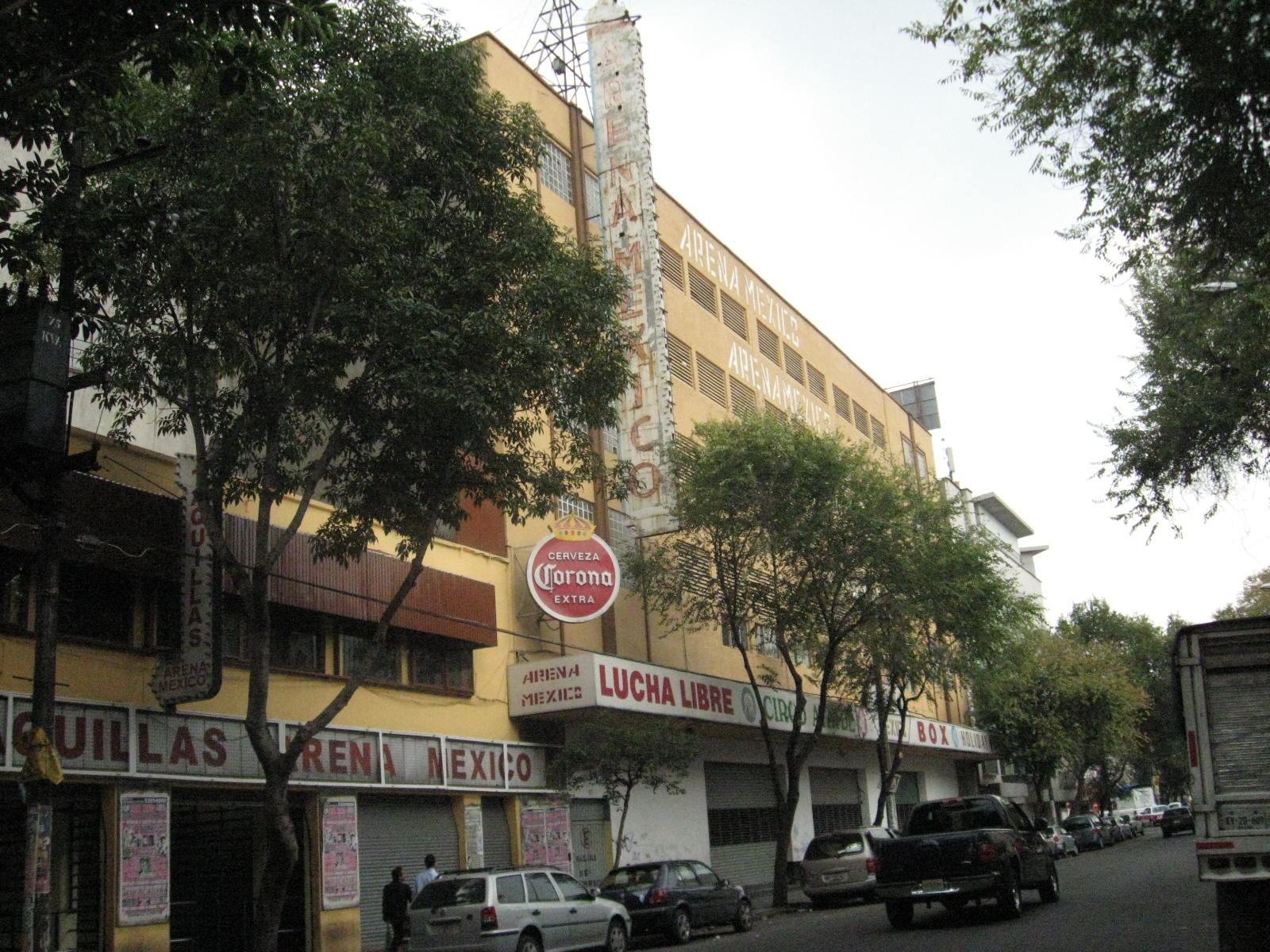
Arena México, CMLL's main venue and location of the Anniversary Show

The Mexican Lucha libre (professional wrestling) company Consejo Mundial de Lucha Libre (CMLL) started out under the name Empresa Mexicana de Lucha Libre ("Mexican Wrestling Company"; EMLL), founded by Salvador Lutteroth in 1933. Lutteroth, inspired by professional wrestling shows he had attended in Texas, decided to become a wrestling promoter and held his first show on September 21, 1933, marking what would be the beginning of organized professional wrestling in Mexico. Lutteroth would later become known as "the father of Lucha Libre" . A year later EMLL held the EMLL 1st Anniversary Show, starting the annual tradition of the Consejo Mundial de Lucha Libre Anniversary Shows that have been held each year ever since, most commonly in September.

Over the years the anniversary show would become the biggest show of the year for CMLL, akin to the Super Bowl for the National Football League (NFL) or WWE's WrestleMania event. The first anniversary show was held in Arena Modelo, which Lutteroth had bought after starting EMLL. In 1942–43 Lutteroth financed the construction of Arena Coliseo, which opened in April 1943. The EMLL 10th Anniversary Show was the first of the anniversary shows to be held in Arena Coliseo. In 1956 Lutteroth had Arena México built in the location of the original Arena Modelo, making Arena México the main venue of EMLL from that point on. Starting with the EMLL 23rd Anniversary Show, all anniversary shows except for the EMLL 46th Anniversary Show have been held in the arena that would become known as "The Cathedral of Lucha Libre". On occasion EMLL held more than one show labelled as their "Anniversary" show, such as two 33rd Anniversary Shows in 1966. Over time the anniversary show series became the oldest, longest-running annual professional wrestling show. In comparison, WWE's WrestleMania is only the fourth oldest still promoted show (CMLL's Arena Coliseo Anniversary Show and Arena México anniversary shows being second and third). EMLL was supposed to hold the EMLL 52nd Anniversary Show on September 20, 1985, but Mexico City was hit by a magnitude 8.0 earthquake. EMLL canceled the event both because of the general devastation but also over fears that Arena México might not be structurally sound after the earthquake.

When Jim Crockett Promotions was bought by Ted Turner in 1988 EMLL became the oldest still active promotion in the world. Traditionally CMLL holds their major events on Friday Nights, replacing their regularly scheduled Super Viernes show.

=== Storylines ===
The event featured at least three professional wrestling matches with different wrestlers involved in pre-existing scripted feuds, plots and storylines. Wrestlers were portrayed as either heels (referred to as rudos in Mexico, those that portray the "bad guys") or faces (técnicos in Mexico, the "good guy" characters) as they followed a series of tension-building events, which culminated in a wrestling match or series of matches. Due to the nature of keeping mainly paper records of wrestling at the time no documentation has been found for the rest of the show.

The main event storyline saw Mogur attacked repeatedly by rudo Máscara Año 2000 in the months following Mogur's Lucha de Apuesta, Mask vs. Mask match victory over As Charro at the previous year at the EMLL 54th Anniversary Show. EMLL built up the storyline tension between the two in a number of main event matches, often with Máscara Año 2000 teaming with his brothers Cien Caras and Universo 2000 (Collectively known as Los Hermanos Dinamita; "The Dynamite Brothers") while Mogur would team with various EMLL tecnicos. Bestia Salvaje won the Mexican National Welterweight Championship from Águila Solitaria on September 3, 1988, only four weeks before the Anniversary show. EMLL deemed El Hijo del Santo as the next challenger for the title, who at the time was six years into a career that would see him become one of the top names in Lucha Libre only a few years later. The American Ken Timbs, better known as Fabuloso Blondy when he worked in Mexico put his NWA World Light Heavyweight Championship on the line against one of EMLL's top names, Lizmark. Fabuloso Blondy had actually won the NWA Championship from Lizmark on March 20, 1988, and was embroiled in a long running feud with him at this point in time, where this championship match was simply the next stage of the storyline.

== Results ==
No.	Results	Stipulations
1	Bestia Salvaje (c) defeated El Hijo del Santo	Best two-out-of three falls match for the Mexican National Welterweight Championship
2	Fabuloso Blondy (c) defeated Lizmark	Best two-out-of three falls match for the NWA World Light Heavyweight Championship
3	Máscara Año 2000 defeated Mogur	Best two-out-of-three falls Lucha de Apuestas mask vs. mask match
(c) / – the champion(s) heading into the match
