= EMLL 56th Anniversary Show =

Mexican Professional wrestling show

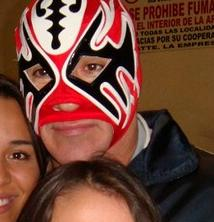
- Atlantis, defended his mask in the main event.
- Promotion: Empresa Mexicana de Lucha Libre
- Date: September 22, 1989
- City: Mexico City, Mexico
- Venue: Arena México
- Attendance: 17,000

Event chronology
← Previous; 33. Aniversario de Arena México	Next → EMLL 57th Anniversary Show

EMLL Anniversary Show chronology
← Previous; 55th Anniversary	Next → 57th Anniversary

The EMLL 56th Anniversary Show (Spanish: 56. Aniversario de EMLL) was a professional wrestling major show event produced by Empresa Mexicana de Lucha Libre (EMLL) that took place on September 22, 1989, in Arena Mexico, Mexico City, Mexico. The event commemorated the 56th anniversary of EMLL, which would become the oldest professional wrestling promotion in the world. The Anniversary show is EMLL's biggest show of the year, their Super Bowl event. The EMLL Anniversary Show series is the longest-running annual professional wrestling show, starting in 1934.

The main event was a tag team Lucha de Apuestas ("Bet match) between the teams of Atlantis and El Satánico and Tierra Viento y Fuego and MS-1 where one team member put their mask on the line and one team member put their hair on the line. As a result, MS-1 was shaved bald and Tierra Viento y Fuego unmasked, revealing that his real name is Alfonso Lira, who would later be known as Damián el Guerrero. The show was rounded out by four Best two-out-of-three falls six-man "Lucha Libre rules" tag team matches.

== Production ==
=== Background ===
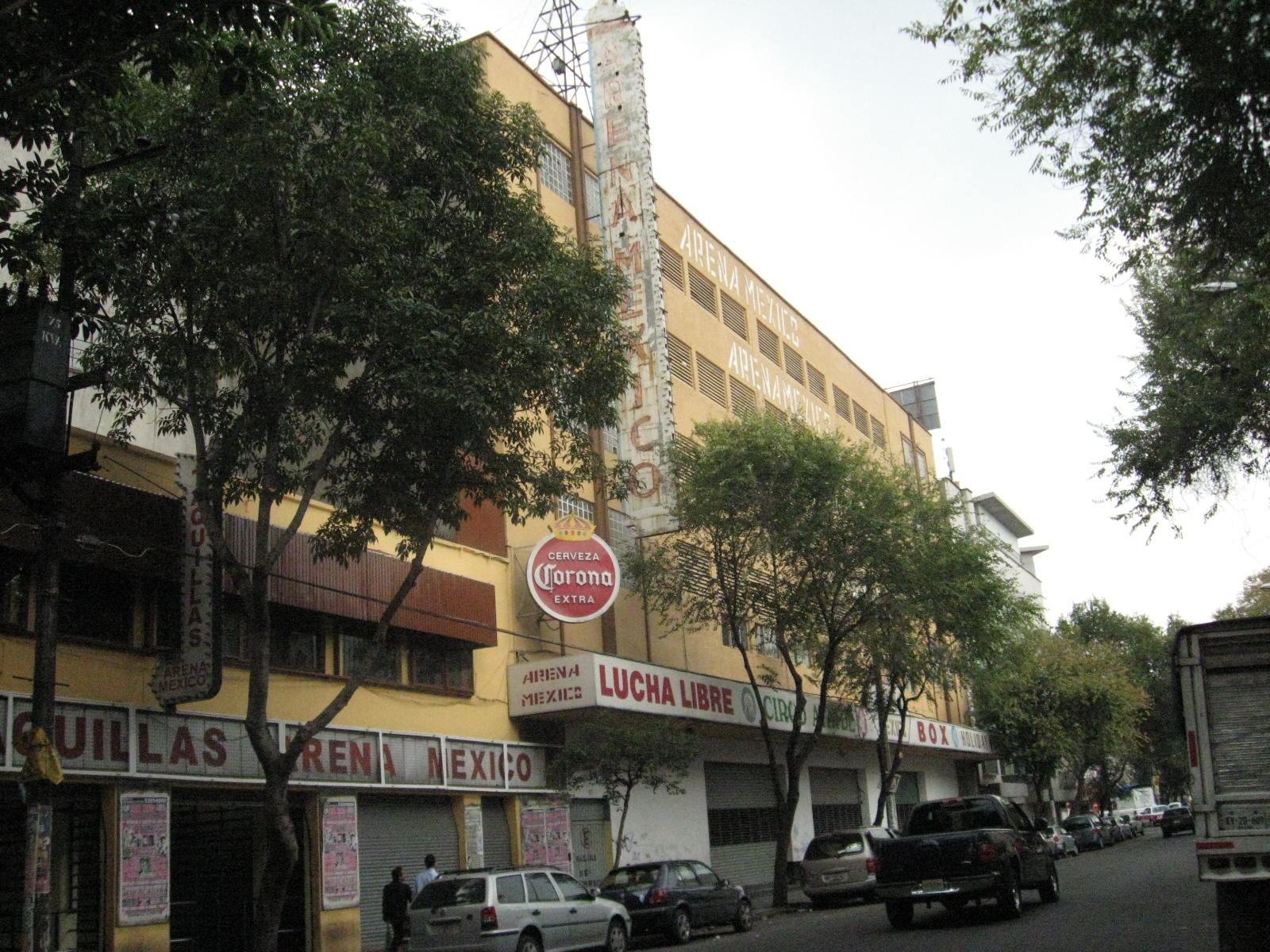
Arena México, CMLL's main venue and location of the Anniversary Show

The Mexican Lucha libre (professional wrestling) company Consejo Mundial de Lucha Libre (CMLL) started out under the name Empresa Mexicana de Lucha Libre ("Mexican Wrestling Company"; EMLL), founded by Salvador Lutteroth in 1933. Lutteroth, inspired by professional wrestling shows he had attended in Texas, decided to become a wrestling promoter and held his first show on September 21, 1933, marking what would be the beginning of organized professional wrestling in Mexico. Lutteroth would later become known as "the father of Lucha Libre" . A year later EMLL held the EMLL 1st Anniversary Show, starting the annual tradition of the Consejo Mundial de Lucha Libre Anniversary Shows that have been held each year ever since, most commonly in September.

Over the years the anniversary show would become the biggest show of the year for CMLL, akin to the Super Bowl for the National Football League (NFL) or WWE's WrestleMania event. The first anniversary show was held in Arena Modelo, which Lutteroth had bought after starting EMLL. In 1942–43 Lutteroth financed the construction of Arena Coliseo, which opened in April 1943. The EMLL 10th Anniversary Show was the first of the anniversary shows to be held in Arena Coliseo. In 1956 Lutteroth had Arena México built in the location of the original Arena Modelo, making Arena México the main venue of EMLL from that point on. Starting with the EMLL 23rd Anniversary Show, all anniversary shows except for the EMLL 46th Anniversary Show have been held in the arena that would become known as "The Cathedral of Lucha Libre". On occasion EMLL held more than one show labelled as their "Anniversary" show, such as two 33rd Anniversary Shows in 1966. Over time the anniversary show series became the oldest, longest-running annual professional wrestling show. In comparison, WWE's WrestleMania is only the fourth oldest still promoted show (CMLL's Arena Coliseo Anniversary Show and Arena México anniversary shows being second and third). EMLL was supposed to hold the EMLL 52nd Anniversary Show on September 20, 1985 but Mexico City was hit by a magnitude 8.0 earthquake. EMLL canceled the event both because of the general devastation but also over fears that Arena México might not be structurally sound after the earthquake.

When Jim Crockett Promotions was bought by Ted Turner in 1988 EMLL became the oldest still active promotion in the world. Traditionally CMLL holds their major events on Friday Nights, replacing their regularly scheduled Super Viernes show.

=== Storylines ===
The event featured five professional wrestling matches with different wrestlers involved in pre-existing scripted feuds, plots and storylines. Wrestlers were portrayed as either heels (referred to as rudos in Mexico, those that portray the "bad guys") or faces (técnicos in Mexico, the "good guy" characters) as they followed a series of tension-building events, which culminated in a wrestling match or series of matches.

The main event match was a continuation of a storyline feud between El Satánico and MS-1 that started with the break-up of Los Infernales ("The Infernals"), a group both of them belonged to. The feud also involved the third Infernales member Pirata Morgan and saw all three fight against each through most of 1989 with various EMLL wrestlers backing them up. At one point MS-1 was aided by the enmascarado ("Masked wrestler) Tierra Viento y Fuego ("Earth, Wind and Fire") in his attacks on El Satánico and actually joined Los Infernales to replace Satánico. During one 2-on-1 sneak attack Satánico was saved by former opponent Atlantis. In the end all four agreed to a match at the 56th Anniversary where Satánico and MS-1 would put their hair on the line and Atlantis and Tierra Viento y Fuego put their masks on the line, in the ultimate "feud settler" match in Lucha Libre, the Lucha de Apuesta ("Bet match").

== Aftermath ==
El Satánico feud with the former Los Infernales continued on, including Pirata Morgan defeating Satánico to win the NWA World Light Heavyweight Championship a month after the anniversary show. Los Infernales would reunite in 1990 for one last run as a trio. Tierra Viento y Fuego would later adopt a new ring persona and be known as "Damián el Guerrero"

== Results ==
No.	Results	Stipulations
1	Winners (Note: Not Abismo Negro who would later use the same ring name.) and Los Solars (Solar I and Solar II) defeated Hombre Bala and Los Texas Rangers (I and II)	Best two-out-of-three falls six-man "Lucha Libre rules" tag team match
2	Aguilita Solitaria, Fuercita Guerrera and Mascarita Sagrada defeated Espectrito, Pequeño Goliath and Piratita Morgan	Best two-out-of-three falls six-man "Lucha Libre rules" tag team match
3	El Faraón, Lizmark and Rayo de Jalisco Jr. defeated Sangre Chicana and Los Hermanos Dinamita (Cien Caras and Máscara Año 2000)	Best two-out-of-three falls six-man "Lucha Libre rules" tag team match
4	Blue Panther, Jerry Estrada and Pirata Morgan defeated Blue Demon Jr., El Dandy and Máscara Sagrada	Best two-out-of-three falls six-man "Lucha Libre rules" tag team match
5	Atlantis (mask) and El Satánico (hair) defeated Los Infernales (Tierra Viento y Fuego (mask) and MS-1 (hair))	Best two-out-of-three falls Lucha de Apuestas mask and hair vs. mask and hair match
