= Juicio Final (1990) =

Mexican Professional wrestling show

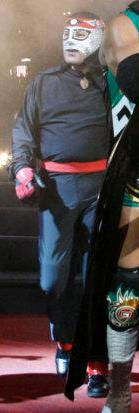
- Octagón, winner of the main event match.
- Promotion: Empresa Mexicana de Lucha Libre
- Date: December 14, 1990 (aired December 16, 1990)
- City: Mexico City, Mexico
- Venue: Arena México
- Attendance: 18,000

Event chronology
← Previous; EMLL 57th Anniversary Show	Next → EMLL 58th Anniversary Show

Juicio Final chronology
← Previous; 1989	Next → 1991

Juicio Final (1990) (Spanish for "Final Judgement") was a professional wrestling supercard show, produced by Empresa Mexicana de Lucha Libre (EMLL) that took place on December 14, 1990 in Arena México, Mexico City, Mexico. It was the last major show produced by EMLL under that name as they were renamed Consejo Mundial de Lucha Libre (CMLL) a few months later. The shows served as the year-end finale for CMLL before Arena México, CMLL's main venue, closed down for the winter for renovations and to host Circo Atayde . The show replaced the regular Super Viernes ("Super Friday") shows held by CMLL since the mid-1930s. This was the second year that CMLL used the name "Jucio Final" for their year-end show, a name they would use on a regular basis going forward, originally for their year even events but later on held at other points in the year.

The main event of Juicio Final was a three-way, round-robin tournament between Octagón, Fuerza Guerrera and Huracán Ramírez II (not to be mistaken for the original Huracán Ramírez). The three men faced off against each other in singles matches until one man had scored two wins, eliminating himself from the match. The remaining two wrestlers faced each other in a Lucha de Apuestas match where both men would put their masks on the line. Guerra defeated both Octagón and Huracan Ramírez IIi in individual matches, forcing those two men to wrestle for their masks in the main event. The final saw Octagón defeat Ramírez, forcing him to unmask in the middle of the ring. Following the match Ramírez revealed his real name, as per Lucha Libre traditions.

The undercard featured an additional Lucha de Apuesta, this time with both competitors' hair on the line as El Dandy defeated El Satánico, which meant that Satánico was shaved bald after the match ended. The opening match of the show was a Six-man "Lucha Libre rules" tag team match where Atlantis teamed up with Rayo de Jalisco Jr. and Ringo Mendoza to defeat the team of Fabuloso Blondy and Los Hermanos Dinamita ("The Dynamite Brothers"; Máscara Año 2000 and Universo 2000) two falls to one.

== Production ==
=== Background ===
For decades Arena México, the main venue of the Mexican professional wrestling promotion Consejo Mundial de Lucha Libre (CMLL), would close down in early December and remain closed into either January or February to allow for renovations as well as letting Circo Atayde occupy the space over the holidays. As a result CMLL usually held a "end of the year" supercard show on the first or second Friday of December in lieu of their normal Super Viernes show. 1955 was the first year where CMLL used the name "El Juicio Final" ("The Final Judgement") for their year-end supershow. Until 2000 the Jucio Final name was always used for the year end show, but since 2000 has at times been used for shows outside of December. It is no longer an annually recurring show, but instead held intermittently sometimes several years apart and not always in the same month of the year either. All Juicio Final shows have been held in Arena México in Mexico City, Mexico which is CMLL's main venue, its "home".

=== Storylines ===
The 1990 Juicio Final show featured five professional wrestling matches scripted by EMLL with some wrestlers involved in scripted feuds. The wrestlers portray either heels (referred to as rudos in Mexico, those that play the part of the "bad guys") or faces (técnicos in Mexico, the "good guy" characters) as they perform.

== Results ==
No.	Results	Stipulations	Times
1	Atlantis, Rayo de Jalisco Jr. and Ringo Mendoza defeated Fabuloso Blondy and Los Hermanos Dinamita (Máscara Año 2000 and Universo 2000) – two falls to one	Best two-out-of-three falls six-man "Lucha Libre rules" tag team match	—
2	El Dandy defeated El Satánico	Best two-out-of-three falls Lucha de Apuestas, hair vs. hair match	23:03
3	Fuerza Guerrera defeated Huracán Ramírez II	Singles match	03:26
4	Fuerza Guerrera defeated Octagón	Singles match	05:23
5	Octagón defeated Huracán Ramírez II	Best two-out-of-three falls Lucha de Apuesta, mask vs. mask match. As a result Huracán Ramírez II was forced to unmask after the match	—

== See also ==
- 1990 in professional wrestling
