= EMLL 54th Anniversary Show =

Mexican Professional wrestling show

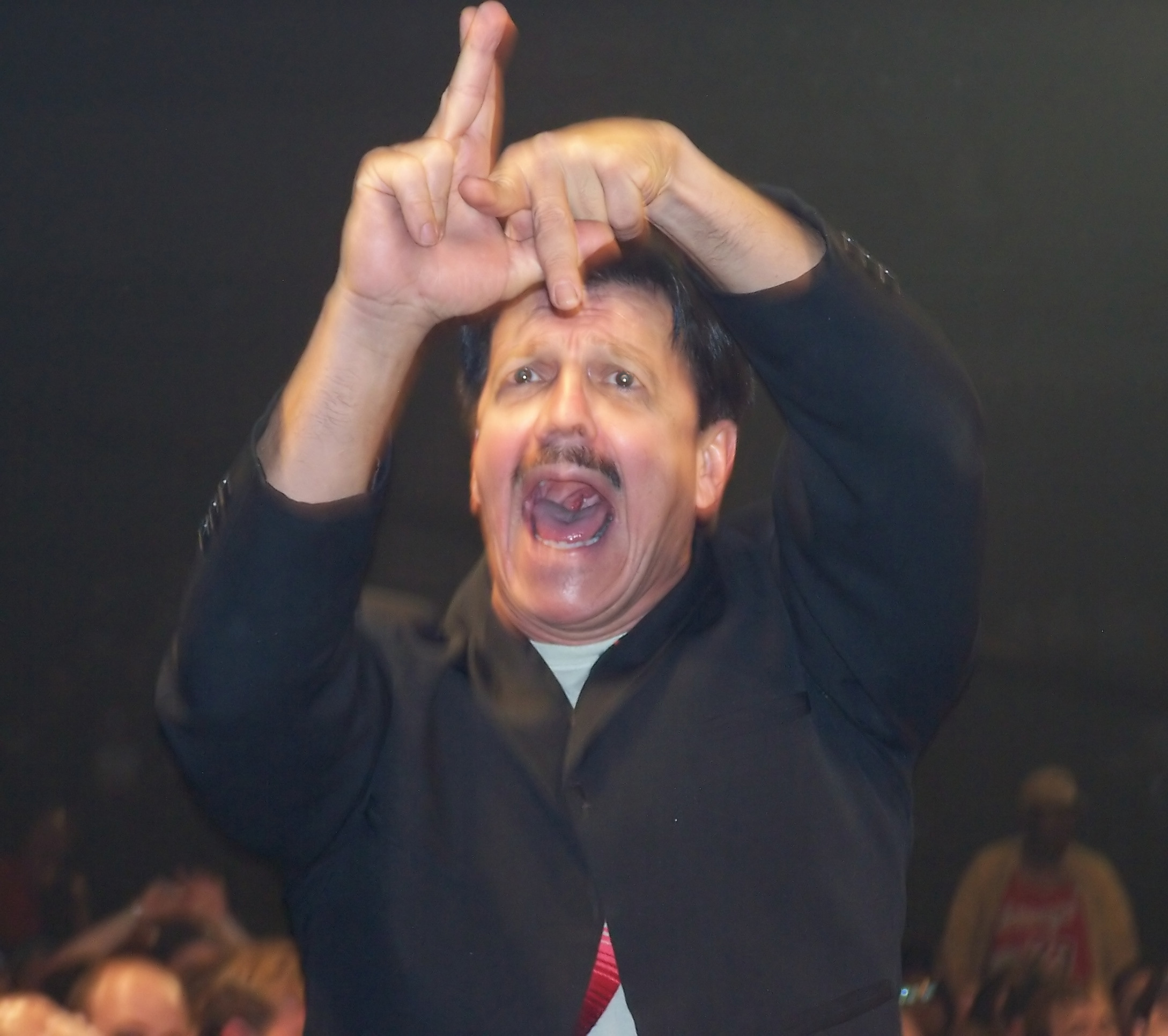
- Hector Guerrero, worked his only CMLL Anniversary show in 1987
- Promotion: Empresa Mexicana de Lucha Libre
- Date: September 18, 1987
- City: Mexico City, Mexico
- Venue: Arena México
- Attendance: 15,000

Pay-per-view chronology
← Previous; Juico Final	Next → Juicio Final

EMLL Anniversary Show chronology
← Previous; 53rd Anniversary	Next → 55th Anniversary

The EMLL 54th Anniversary Show (Spanish: 54. Aniversario de EMLL) was a professional wrestling major show event produced by Empresa Mexicana de Lucha Libre (EMLL) that took place on September 18, 1987, in Arena México, Mexico City, Mexico. The event commemorated the 54th anniversary of CMLL, which would become the oldest professional wrestling promotion in the world. The Anniversary show is EMLL's biggest show of the year, their Super Bowl event. The EMLL Anniversary Show series is the longest-running annual professional wrestling show, starting in 1934.

The show was promoted as Gory Guerrero’s retirement show and featured all four of his sons (Chavo, Mando, and Hector and Eddy) wrestling on the show. The main event of the show was a Lucha de Apuestas ("Bet match) where both As Charro and Mogur wagered their masks on the outcome of the match, with the loser being forced to take off his mask at the end of the show. The show featured an additional Lucha de Apuestas match as Pirata Morgan and Tony Salazar wagered their hair (Both were already unmasked) on the outcome of their match, with the loser being shaved bald after the match was over).

== Production ==
=== Background ===
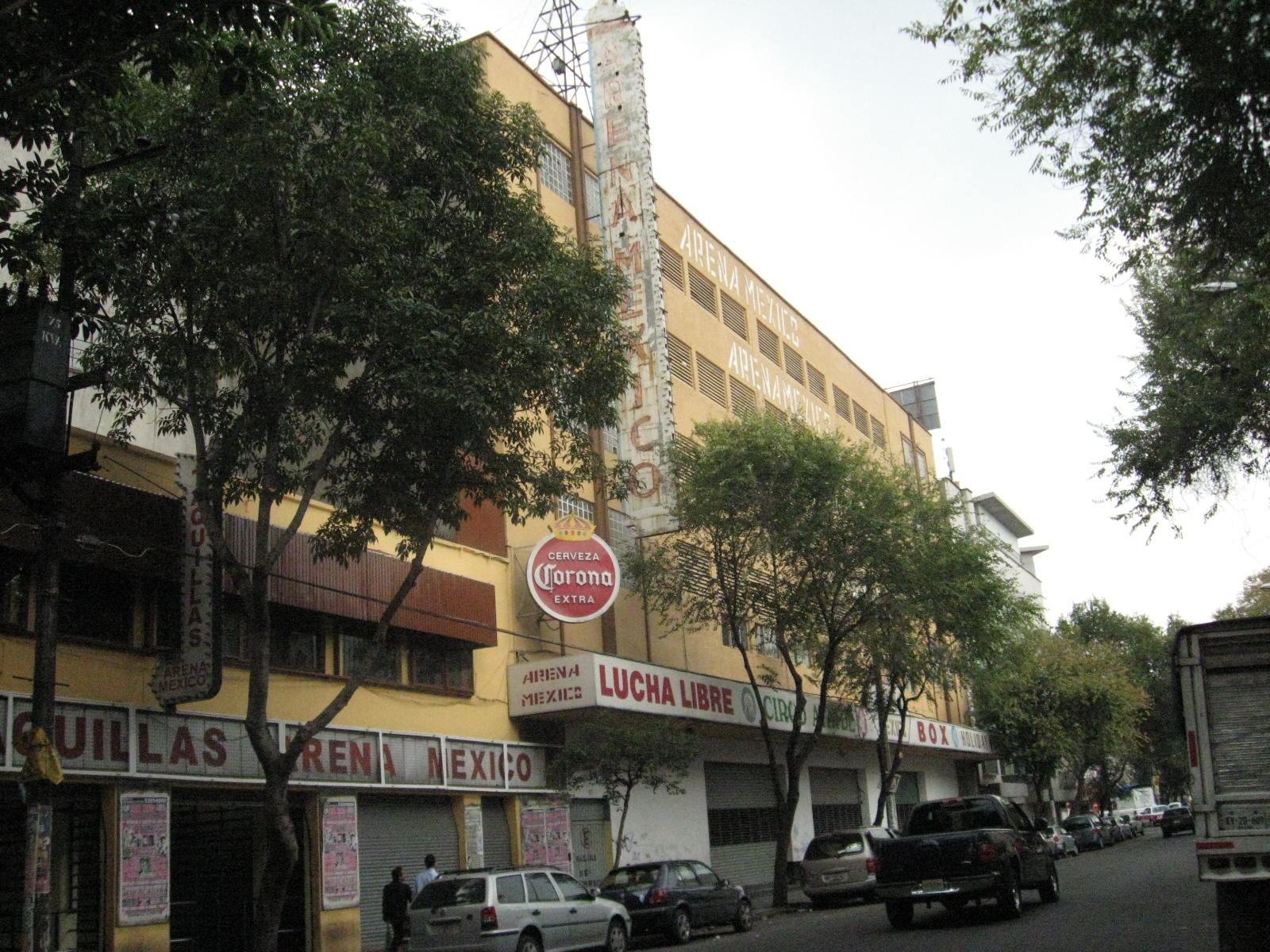
Arena México, CMLL's main venue and location of the Anniversary Show

The Mexican Lucha libre (professional wrestling) company Consejo Mundial de Lucha Libre (CMLL) started out under the name Empresa Mexicana de Lucha Libre ("Mexican Wrestling Company"; EMLL), founded by Salvador Lutteroth in 1933. Lutteroth, inspired by professional wrestling shows he had attended in Texas, decided to become a wrestling promoter and held his first show on September 21, 1933, marking what would be the beginning of organized professional wrestling in Mexico. Lutteroth would later become known as "the father of Lucha Libre" . A year later EMLL held the EMLL 1st Anniversary Show, starting the annual tradition of the Consejo Mundial de Lucha Libre Anniversary Shows that have been held each year ever since, most commonly in September.

Over the years the anniversary show would become the biggest show of the year for CMLL, akin to the Super Bowl for the National Football League (NFL) or WWE's WrestleMania event. The first anniversary show was held in Arena Modelo, which Lutteroth had bought after starting EMLL. In 1942–43 Lutteroth financed the construction of Arena Coliseo, which opened in April 1943. The EMLL 10th Anniversary Show was the first of the anniversary shows to be held in Arena Coliseo. In 1956 Lutteroth had Arena México built in the location of the original Arena Modelo, making Arena México the main venue of EMLL from that point on. Starting with the EMLL 23rd Anniversary Show, all anniversary shows except for the EMLL 46th Anniversary Show have been held in the arena that would become known as "The Cathedral of Lucha Libre". On occasion EMLL held more than one show labelled as their "Anniversary" show, such as two 33rd Anniversary Shows in 1966. Over time the anniversary show series became the oldest, longest-running annual professional wrestling show. In comparison, WWE's WrestleMania is only the fourth oldest still promoted show (CMLL's Arena Coliseo Anniversary Show and Arena México anniversary shows being second and third). EMLL was supposed to hold the EMLL 52nd Anniversary Show on September 20, 1985 but Mexico City was hit by a magnitude 8.0 earthquake. EMLL canceled the event both because of the general devastation but also over fears that Arena México might not be structurally sound after the earthquake. Traditionally CMLL holds their major events on Friday Nights, replacing their regularly scheduled Super Viernes show.

=== Storylines ===
The event featured six professional wrestling matches with different wrestlers involved in pre-existing scripted feuds, plots and storylines. Wrestlers were portrayed as either heels (referred to as rudos in Mexico, those that portray the "bad guys") or faces (técnicos in Mexico, the "good guy" characters) as they followed a series of tension-building events, which culminated in a wrestling match or series of matches.

== Event ==
The EMLL 54th Anniversary Show served the dual purpose of not only celebrating Empresa Mexicana de Lucha Libre (EMLL) 5th anniversary but also to commemorate the retirement of Gory Guerrero, one of the pioneers in Mexican wrestling. Guerrero had made his professional wrestling debut in 1937 and over the years been involved in a large number of memorable matches and story lines and innovated a number of wrestling moves, including two named after him: the Gory Special, a type of backbreaker and the Gory Bomb as well as being one of the first to use the La de a Caballo or Camel Clutch. To celebrate the event EMLL had all four of Gory Guerrero's children appear on the show, at the time only Gory's youngest son Eddy worked for EMLL full-time while Chavo, Mando and Hector worked primarily in the United States but were contracted for this show specifically. In the second match of the evening the young Eddy Guerrero teamed up with his regular partner El Hijo del Santo, a second generation wrestler like Eddy as he was the son of one of Lucha Libre most famous names El Santo. The two had formed a very successful tag team called La Pareja Atomica ("The Atomic Pair"). The team took on and defeated the rudo team of Hijo del Gladiador and El Dandy. The rest of the Guerrero sons wrestled in the semi-main event, the second to last match of the evening as they defeated the team of Sangre Chicana, Gran Markus Jr. and Gran Markus, Sr., whose family relationship was a storyline relationship only, not father and son as their ring names would otherwise indicate.

The 54th Anniversary show featured two Luchas de Apuestas, or "Bet Matches", which was rare even for EMLL's biggest show of the year. In the main event the tecnico Mogur and the rudo As Charro both put their masks on the line as they faced off in a best of three falls match. The show ended with Mogur being victorious and As Charro being forced to unmask and reveal his real name in front of the Arena México crowd. The second Luchas de Apuestas match saw Pirata Morgan defeated Tony Salazar not bet their masks since neither actually wore one, instead they put their hair on the line. The Rudo Pirata Morgan defeated the veteran Tony Salazar, forcing Salazar to have his head shaved bald in the middle of the ring. The show was rounded out by the 'father/son team of Rayo de Jalisco Jr. and Rayo de Jalisco, Sr. teaming up with Lizmark to defeat the team of Herodes, Blue Panther and Manuel Escobedo in the third match of the night. In the first match of the night Los Infernales, one of the most successful Trios of the time, represented by MS-1 and El Satánico, defeating the team of Kung Fu and Ray Mendoza, who is the father of the five Villanos, I, II, III, IV and V.

== Results ==
No.	Results	Stipulations
1	Los Infernales (MS-1 and El Satánico) defeated Kung Fu and Ray Mendoza	Best two-out-of-three falls tag team match
2	La Pareja Atomica (Eddy Guerrero and El Hijo del Santo) defeated El Hijo del Gladiador and El Dandy	Best two-out-of-three falls tag team match
3	Lizmark, Rayo de Jalisco Jr., and Rayo de Jalisco Sr. defeated Herodes, Blue Panther, and Manuel Escobedo	Best two-out-of-three falls six-man "Lucha Libre rules" tag team match
4	Pirata Morgan defeated Tony Salazar	Best two-out-of-three falls Lucha de Apuestas hair vs. hair match
5	Chavo, Mando, and Hector Guerrero defeated Sangre Chicana, Gran Markus Jr., and Gran Markus Sr.	Best two-out-of-three falls six-man "Lucha Libre rules" tag team match
6	Mogur defeated As Charro	Best two-out-of-three falls Lucha de Apuestas mask vs. mask match
