= EMLL 58th Anniversary Show =

Mexican Professional wrestling show

EMLL 58th Anniversary show
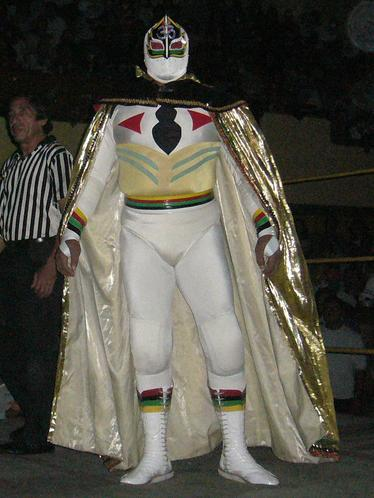
- Máscara Sagrada, defended the Mexican National Light Heavyweight Championship on the show
- Promotion: Empresa Mexicana de Lucha Libre
- Date: September 8, 1991
- City: Mexico City, Mexico
- Venue: Arena México
- Attendance: 18,500

Event chronology
| ← Previous; EMLL 57th Anniversary Show | Next → Juicio Final |

CMLL Anniversary Shows chronology
| ← Previous; 57th Anniversary | Next → 59th Anniversary |

The EMLL 58th Anniversary Show (Spanish: 58. Aniversario de CMLL) was a professional wrestling major show event produced by Empresa Mexicana de Lucha Libre (EMLL) that took place on September 8, 1991, in Arena Mexico, Mexico City, Mexico. This would be the last show promoted under the EMLL name as the organization changed its name to Consejo Mundial de Lucha Libre in the winter of 1991. The event commemorated the 58th anniversary of EMLL, the oldest professional wrestling promotion in the world. The Anniversary show is EMLL's biggest show of the year, their Super Bowl event. The CMLL Anniversary Show series is the longest-running annual professional wrestling show, starting in 1934.

The show consisted of four matches, with the main event being a Lucha de Apuestas, hair vs. hair match between Konnan, Cien Caras, and Perro Aguayo. The show also featured a Six-man tag team match, an eight-man match, and a match where Máscara Sagrada defended the Mexican National Light Heavyweight Championship against Pirata Morgan.

== Production ==
=== Background ===
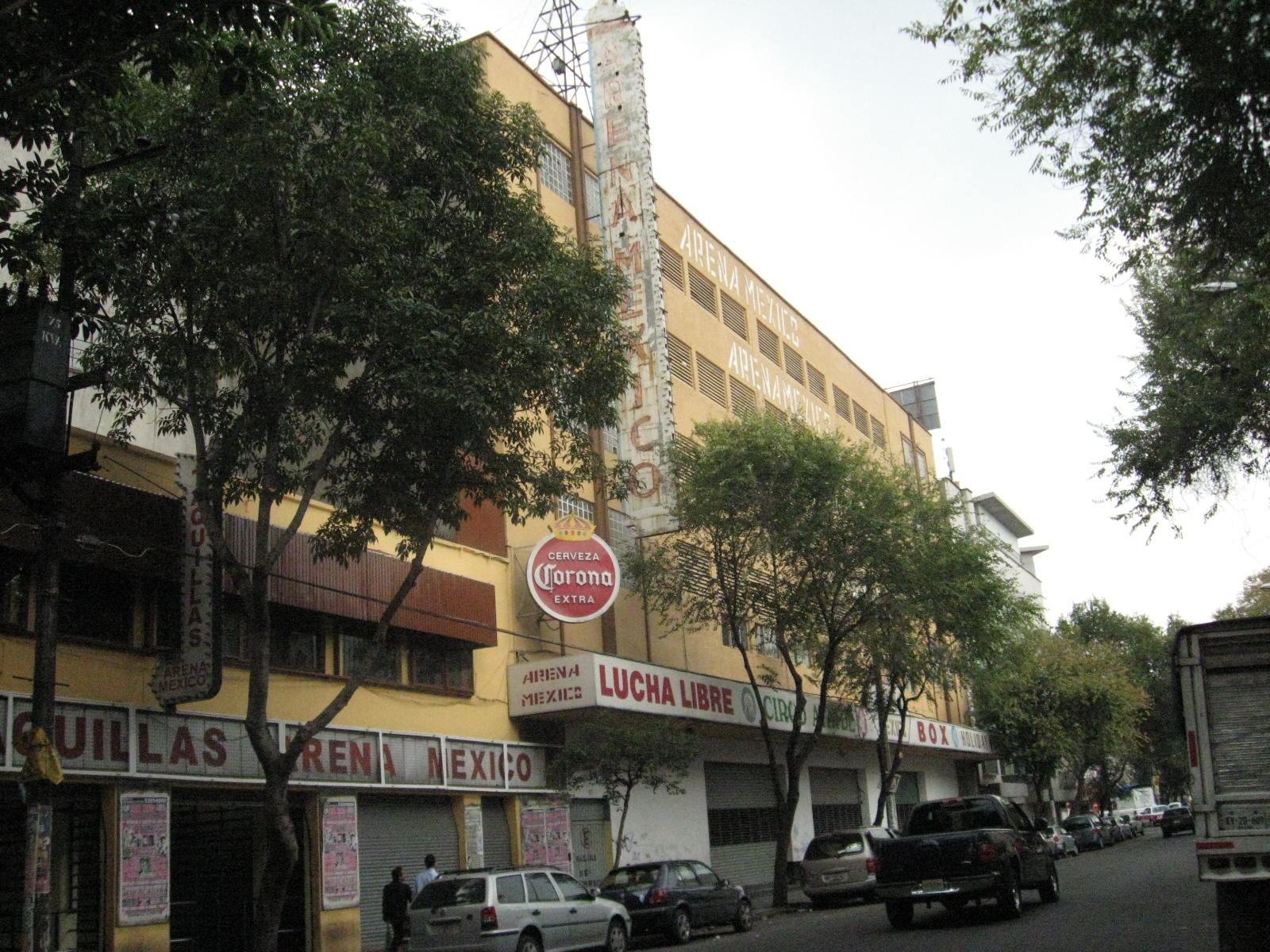
Arena México, CMLL's main venue and location of the Anniversary Show

The Mexican Lucha libre (professional wrestling) company Consejo Mundial de Lucha Libre (CMLL) started out under the name Empresa Mexicana de Lucha Libre ("Mexican Wrestling Company"; EMLL), founded by Salvador Lutteroth in 1933. Lutteroth, inspired by professional wrestling shows he had attended in Texas, decided to become a wrestling promoter and held his first show on September 21, 1933, marking what would be the beginning of organized professional wrestling in Mexico. Lutteroth would later become known as "the father of Lucha Libre" . A year later EMLL held the EMLL 1st Anniversary Show, starting the annual tradition of the Consejo Mundial de Lucha Libre Anniversary Shows that have been held each year ever since, most commonly in September.

Over the years the anniversary show would become the biggest show of the year for CMLL, akin to the Super Bowl for the National Football League (NFL) or WWE's WrestleMania event. The first anniversary show was held in Arena Modelo, which Lutteroth had bought after starting EMLL. In 1942–43 Lutteroth financed the construction of Arena Coliseo, which opened in April 1943. The EMLL 10th Anniversary Show was the first of the anniversary shows to be held in Arena Coliseo. In 1956 Lutteroth had Arena México built in the location of the original Arena Modelo, making Arena México the main venue of EMLL from that point on. Starting with the EMLL 23rd Anniversary Show, all anniversary shows except for the EMLL 46th Anniversary Show have been held in the arena that would become known as "The Cathedral of Lucha Libre". On occasion EMLL held more than one show labelled as their "Anniversary" show, such as two 33rd Anniversary Shows in 1966. Over time the anniversary show series became the oldest, longest-running annual professional wrestling show. In comparison, WWE's WrestleMania is only the fourth oldest still promoted show (CMLL's Arena Coliseo Anniversary Show and Arena México anniversary shows being second and third). EMLL was supposed to hold the EMLL 52nd Anniversary Show on September 20, 1985 but Mexico City was hit by a magnitude 8.0 earthquake. EMLL canceled the event both because of the general devastation but also over fears that Arena México might not be structurally sound after the earthquake.

When Jim Crockett Promotions was bought by Ted Turner in 1988 EMLL became the oldest still active promotion in the world. Traditionally CMLL holds their major events on Friday Nights, replacing their regularly scheduled Super Viernes show.

=== Storylines ===
The event featured five professional wrestling matches with different wrestlers involved in pre-existing scripted feuds, plots and storylines. Wrestlers were portrayed as either heels (referred to as rudos in Mexico, those that portray the "bad guys") or faces (técnicos in Mexico, the "good guy" characters) as they followed a series of tension-building events, which culminated in a wrestling match or series of matches.

== Results ==
| No. | Results | Stipulations | Times |
|---|---|---|---|
| 1 | El Hijo del Santo, El Hijo del Solitario and Lizmark Jr. defeated Los Brazos (Brazo de Oro, Brazo de Plata and El Brazo) | Best two-out-of-three falls six-man "Lucha Libre rules" tag team match | — |
| 2 | Máscara Sagrada (c) defeated Pirata Morgan | Best two-out-of-three falls match for the Mexican National Light Heavyweight Championship | 24:03 |
| 3 | Octagón, Atlantis, Vampiro Canadiense, Rayo de Jalisco Jr., and Konnan defeated Cien Caras, Máscara Año 2000, Javier Cruz, Pierroth Jr., and Perro Aguayo | Best two-out-of-three falls eight-man "Lucha Libre rules" tag team match | — |
| 4 | Aníbal, Rayo de Jalisco Jr., and Lizmark defeated Nitron and Los Hermanos Dinamita (Máscara Año 2000, and Universo 2000) | Best two-out-of-three falls eight-man "Lucha Libre rules" tag team match | 11:52 |
| 5 | Black Magic, El Dandy, and Ringo Mendoza vs. Fuerza Guerrera, Jerry Estrada, and Pierroth Jr. ended in an unknown manner | Best two-out-of-three falls eight-man "Lucha Libre rules" tag team match | 12:51 |
| 6 | Konnan defeated Perro Aguayo, Cien Caras was also on the match | Best two-out-of-three falls Lucha de Apuestas, triangular hair vs. hair match. As a result Perro Aguayo had his hair shaved off after the match. | — |
(c) / – the champion(s) heading into the match
