= Juicio Final (1987) =

Mexican professional wrestling event

- Initial poster, listing "Meduza" in the fourth match, later replaced by Rossy Moreno
- Promotion: Empresa Mexicana de Lucha Libre
- Date: December 4, 1987
- City: Mexico City, Mexico
- Venue: Arena México

Event chronology
← Previous; EMLL 54th Anniversary Show	Next →: 32. Aniversario de Arena México

Juicio Final chronology
← Previous; 1986	Next → 1988

Juicio Final (1987) (Spanish for "Final Judgement" 1987) was a professional wrestling supercard show, scripted and produced by Consejo Mundial de Lucha Libre (CMLL), which took place on December 4, 1987, in Arena México of Mexico City, Mexico. The show served as the year-end finale for CMLL before Arena México, CMLL's main venue, closed down for the winter for renovations and to host Circo Atayde . The shows replaced the regular Super Viernes ("Super Friday") shows held by CMLL since the mid-1930s.

The five match Juicio Final show was capped off with a Lucha de Apuestas, or "mask vs. mask" match that saw Cien Caras defeat Siglo XX, forcing Siglo XX to unmask and reveal that his real name was José Luis Pérez Rodríguez. The fourth match was another Lucha de Apuestas match, this time with Irma Águilar defeating Rossy Moreno, forcing Moreno to have all her hair shaved off afterwards. The originally planned match was Irma Águilar facing off against a wrestler called "Meduza" but ended up defeating Moreno instead.

== Production ==
=== Background ===
For decades Arena México, the main venue of the Mexican professional wrestling promotion Consejo Mundial de Lucha Libre (CMLL), would close down in early December and remain closed into either January or February to allow for renovations as well as letting Circo Atayde occupy the space over the holidays. As a result CMLL usually held a "end of the year" supercard show on the first or second Friday of December in lieu of their normal Super Viernes show. 1955 was the first year where CMLL used the name "El Juicio Final" ("The Final Judgement") for their year-end supershow. It is no longer an annually recurring show, but instead held intermittently sometimes several years apart and not always in the same month of the year either. All Juicio Final shows have been held in Arena México in Mexico City, Mexico which is CMLL's main venue, its "home".

=== Storylines ===
The 1987 Juicio Final show featured five professional wrestling matches scripted by CMLL with some wrestlers involved in scripted feuds. The wrestlers portray either heels (referred to as rudos in Mexico, those that play the part of the "bad guys") or faces (técnicos in Mexico, the "good guy" characters) as they perform.

== Results ==
No.	Results	Stipulations
1	El Solar, Tony Salazar, and Villano I defeated Los Destructores (Emilio Charles Jr., Tony Arce, and Vulcano) by disqualification	Best two-out-of-three falls six-man tag team match
2	Américo Rocca, Chamaco Valaguez, and Rokambole defeated Los Temerarios (Black Terry, Jose Luis Feliciano, and Shu El Guerrero)	Best two-out-of-three falls six-man tag team match
3	El Dandy, Rayo de Jalisco Jr., and La Fiera defeated Hombre Arana, Máscara Año 2000, and Sangre Chicana	Best two-out-of-three falls six-man tag team match
4	Irma Aguilar defeated Rossy Moreno	Best two-out-of-three falls Lucha de Apuestas, hair vs. hair match
5	Cien Caras defeated Siglo XX	Best two-out-of-three falls Lucha de Apuestas, mask vs. mask match
