= EMLL 57th Anniversary Show =

Mexican Professional wrestling show

EMLL 57th Anniversary show
- official poster for the event.
- Promotion: Empresa Mexicana de Lucha Libre
- Date: September 21, 1990
- City: Mexico City, Mexico
- Venue: Arena México

Event chronology
← Previous; EMLL 56th Anniversary Show	Next → Juicio Final

CMLL Anniversary Shows chronology
← Previous; 56th Anniversary	Next → 58th Anniversary

The EMLL 57th Anniversary Show (Spanish: 57. Aniversario de EMLL) was a professional wrestling major show event produced by Empresa Mexicana de Lucha Libre (EMLL) that took place on September 21, 1990, in Arena Mexico, Mexico City, Mexico. The event commemorated the 57th anniversary of EMLL, the oldest professional wrestling promotion in the world. The Anniversary show is EMLL's biggest show of the year, their Super Bowl event. The CMLL Anniversary Show series is the longest-running annual professional wrestling show, starting in 1934.

The show consisted of six matches, with the main event being a Lucha de Apuestas, mask vs. mask match between Rayo de Jalisco Jr. and Cien Caras, considered one of the most important Apuesta matches of the late 1980s/early 1990s. Also on the show, Atlantis defended the NWA World Middleweight Championship against Emilio Charles Jr. The show also featured four six-man tag team matches.

== Production ==
=== Background ===
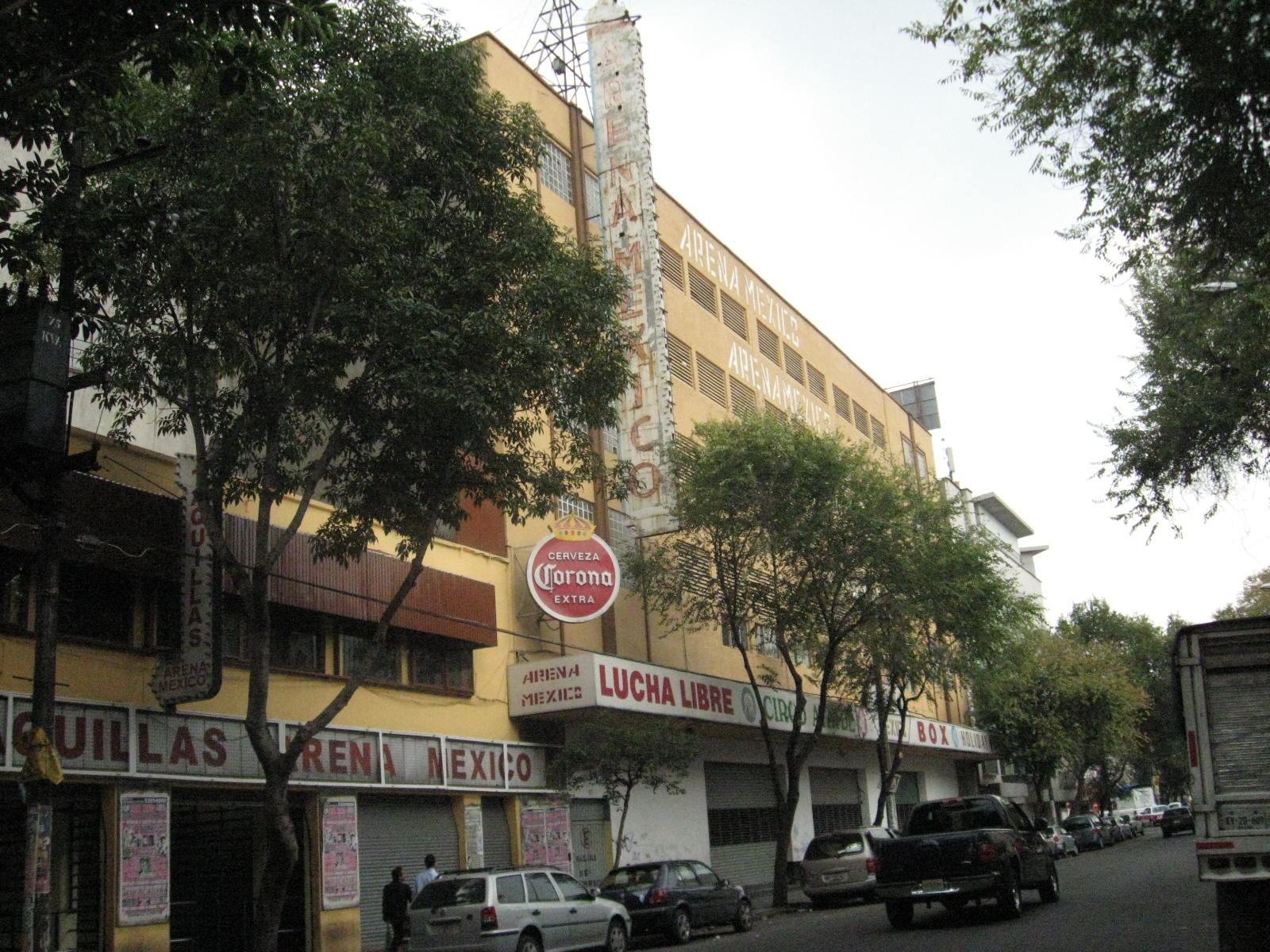
Arena México, CMLL's main venue and location of the Anniversary Show

The Mexican Lucha libre (professional wrestling) company Consejo Mundial de Lucha Libre (CMLL) started out under the name Empresa Mexicana de Lucha Libre ("Mexican Wrestling Company"; EMLL), founded by Salvador Lutteroth in 1933. Lutteroth, inspired by professional wrestling shows he had attended in Texas, decided to become a wrestling promoter and held his first show on September 21, 1933, marking what would be the beginning of organized professional wrestling in Mexico. Lutteroth would later become known as "the father of Lucha Libre" . A year later EMLL held the EMLL 1st Anniversary Show, starting the annual tradition of the Consejo Mundial de Lucha Libre Anniversary Shows that have been held each year ever since, most commonly in September.

Over the years the anniversary show would become the biggest show of the year for CMLL, akin to the Super Bowl for the National Football League (NFL) or WWE's WrestleMania event. The first anniversary show was held in Arena Modelo, which Lutteroth had bought after starting EMLL. In 1942–43 Lutteroth financed the construction of Arena Coliseo, which opened in April 1943. The EMLL 10th Anniversary Show was the first of the anniversary shows to be held in Arena Coliseo. In 1956 Lutteroth had Arena México built in the location of the original Arena Modelo, making Arena México the main venue of EMLL from that point on. Starting with the EMLL 23rd Anniversary Show, all anniversary shows except for the EMLL 46th Anniversary Show have been held in the arena that would become known as "The Cathedral of Lucha Libre". On occasion EMLL held more than one show labelled as their "Anniversary" show, such as two 33rd Anniversary Shows in 1966. Over time the anniversary show series became the oldest, longest-running annual professional wrestling show. In comparison, WWE's WrestleMania is only the fourth oldest still promoted show (CMLL's Arena Coliseo Anniversary Show and Arena México anniversary shows being second and third). EMLL was supposed to hold the EMLL 52nd Anniversary Show on September 20, 1985, but Mexico City was hit by a magnitude 8.0 earthquake. EMLL canceled the event both because of the general devastation but also over fears that Arena México might not be structurally sound after the earthquake.

When Jim Crockett Promotions was bought by Ted Turner in 1988 EMLL became the oldest still active promotion in the world. Traditionally CMLL holds their major events on Friday Nights, replacing their regularly scheduled Super Viernes show.

=== Storylines ===
The event featured six professional wrestling matches with different wrestlers involved in pre-existing scripted feuds, plots and storylines. Wrestlers were portrayed as either heels (referred to as rudos in Mexico, those that portray the "bad guys") or faces (técnicos in Mexico, the "good guy" characters) as they followed a series of tension-building events, which culminated in a wrestling match or series of matches.

== Results ==
No.	Results	Stipulations	Times
1	Pequeño Cobarde, Mascarita Sagrada, and Aguilita Solitaria defeated Piratita Morgan, MS-1/2, and Espectrito	Best two-out-of-three falls six-man "Lucha Libre rules" tag team match	—
2	Los Brazos (Brazo de Oro, Brazo de Plata, and El Brazo) vs. Volador, Super Astro, and Ángel Azteca ended in a no contest	Best two-out-of-three falls six-man "Lucha Libre rules" tag team match	—
3	Mike Golden, Abdul the Great, and the Great Sheik defeated El Dandy, Solomon Grundy, and El Satánico	Best two-out-of-three falls six-man "Lucha Libre rules" tag team match	—
4	El Hijo del Santo, Lizmark, and Ringo Mendoza defeated Konnan, Perro Aguayo, and Fabuloso Blondie	Best two-out-of-three falls six-man "Lucha Libre rules" tag team match	—
5	Atlantis (c) defeated Emilio Charles Jr.	Best two-out-of-three falls match for the NWA World Middleweight Championship	07:33
6	Rayo de Jalisco Jr. defeated Cien Caras	Best two-out-of-three falls Lucha de Apuestas, mask vs. mask match.	11:49
(c) / – the champion(s) heading into the match

== See also ==
- 1990 in professional wrestling
