= Solar power in Belarus =

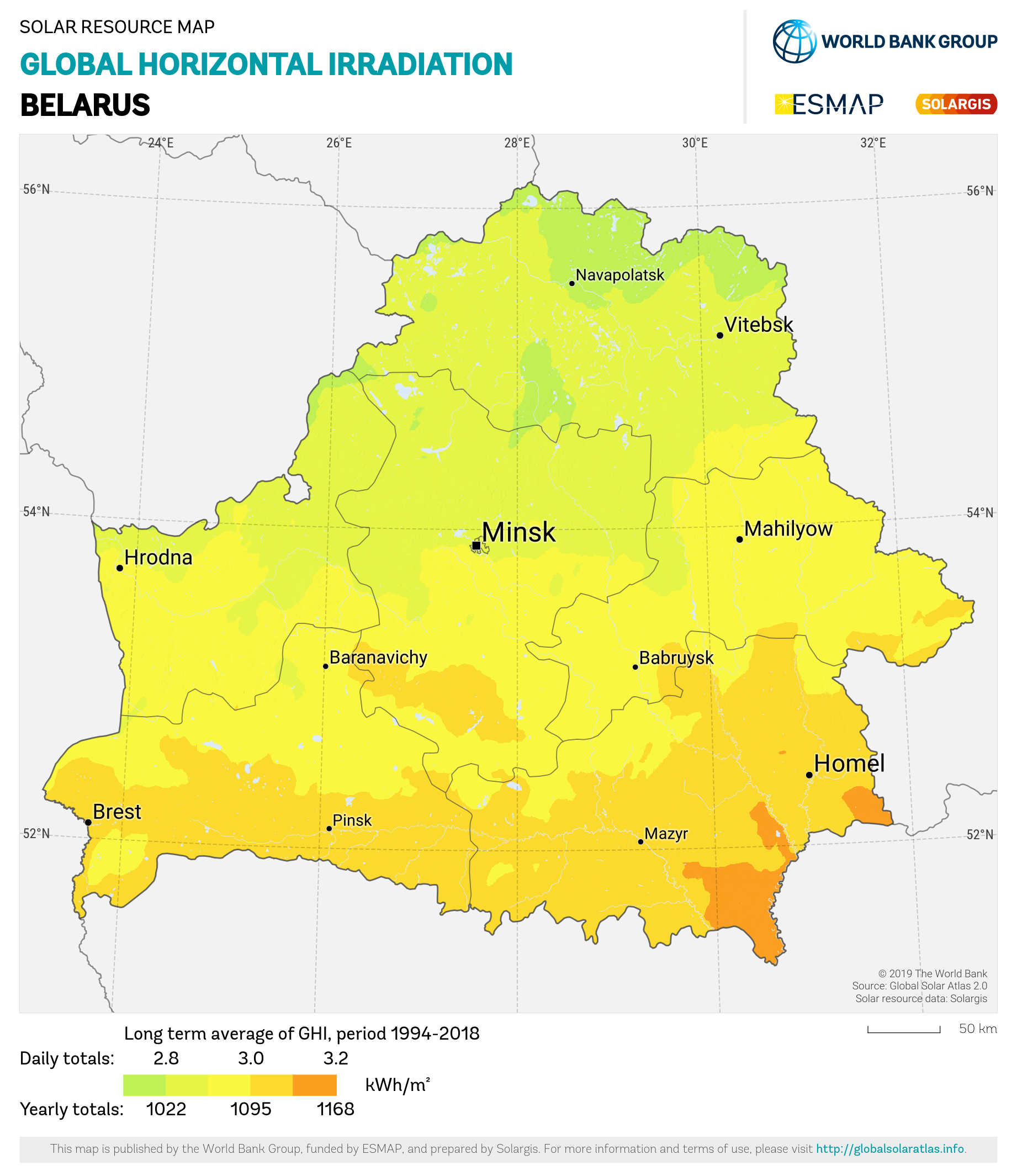
Solar potential of Belarus

As of 2021 there is little use of solar power in Belarus but much potential as part of the expansion of renewable energy in Belarus, as the country has few fossil fuel resources and imports much of its energy. At the end of 2019 there was just over 150MW produced by solar power.

== Solar farms ==
In June 2016, a solar farm in the Molodechno area with a capacity of 5.7-5.8 MW was launched - more than any of the previous ones, not only in Belarus, but also in Estonia, Lithuania, Latvia and Poland. In August of that same year, the Solar II farm was opened in Bragin District, more than three times its predecessor's capacity. In 2017, about 30 photovoltaic power plants with a total capacity of about 41 MW were used. In the same year, the largest photovoltaic farm in Rechytsa, 55 MW was put into operation. The state authorities formulated the goal to increase the total capacity of this type of power plants to 250 MW by the end of 2020.

According to the Belarusian law, the state is obliged to connect devices that produce energy from renewable sources to the general grid and purchase energy from them.

In 2017 in Smarhon’ was built SPP with capacity of 17 MW.

Byelorussian construction company CJSC "Belzarubezhstroi" will bring in 2019 in the Cherykaw District of Mogilev Region the largest photo-electric power station in the country with the capacity of 109 MWp.

== See also ==
- Energy in Belarus
