= Juicio Final (1991) =

Mexican Professional wrestling show

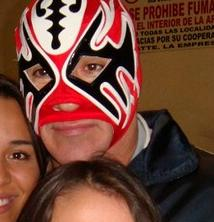
- Atlantis, teamed with Dos Caras and Konnan on the show
- Promotion: Consejo Mundial de Lucha Libre
- Date: December 13, 1991 (aired December 15, 1991)
- City: Mexico City, Mexico
- Venue: Arena México

Event chronology
← Previous; EMLL 58th Anniversary Show	Next →: 36. Aniversario de Arena México

Juicio Final chronology
← Previous; 1990	Next → 1992

Juicio Final (1991) (Spanish for "Final Judgement") was a professional wrestling television special event produced by Consejo Mundial de Lucha Libre (CMLL) that took place on December 13, 1991 in Arena México, Mexico City, Mexico. Documentation foronly three matches on the show have been found, the main event and two Six-man "Lucha Libre rules" tag team match undercard matches. The show served as the year-end finale for CMLL before Arena México, CMLL's main venue, closed down for the winter for renovations and to host Circo Atayde . The shows replaced the regular Super Viernes ("Super Friday") shows held by CMLL since the mid-1930s. This was the third year that CMLL used the name "Jucio Final" for their year-end show, a name they would use on a regular basis going forward, originally for their year even events but later on held at other points in the year.

The main event of Juicio Final was a Lucha de Apuestas, mask vs. mask match between Máscara Año 2000 and Aníbal. The match saw Máscara Año 2000 defeat Aníbal, forcing him to unmask and reveal his real name, Carlos Ignacio Carrillo Contreras, after the match per Lucha libre traditions. The first of two six-man tag team matches was built around the feud between Kato Kung Lee and Kung Fu as they each captained a team for the match. Kato Kung Lee teamed with Mexican National Tag Team Champions Misterioso and Volador to defeat Kung Fu, Blue Panther and Herodes. The other six man tag team match saw three of CMLL's top tecnicos in Atlantis, Dos Caras and Konnan, defeat one of CMLL's top rudo trios Los Infernales (El Satánico, MS-1 and Pirata Morgan).

== Production ==
=== Background ===
For decades Arena México, the main venue of the Mexican professional wrestling promotion Consejo Mundial de Lucha Libre (CMLL), would close down in early December and remain closed into either January or February to allow for renovations as well as letting Circo Atayde occupy the space over the holidays. As a result CMLL usually held a "end of the year" supercard show on the first or second Friday of December in lieu of their normal Super Viernes show. 1955 was the first year where CMLL used the name "El Juicio Final" ("The Final Judgement") for their year-end supershow. Until 2000 the Jucio Final name was always used for the year end show, but since 2000 has at times been used for shows outside of December. It is no longer an annually recurring show, but instead held intermittently sometimes several years apart and not always in the same month of the year either. All Juicio Final shows have been held in Arena México in Mexico City, Mexico which is CMLL's main venue, its "home".

=== Storylines ===
The 1991 Juicio Final show featured five professional wrestling matches scripted by CMLL with some wrestlers involved in scripted feuds. The wrestlers portray either heels (referred to as rudos in Mexico, those that play the part of the "bad guys") or faces (técnicos in Mexico, the "good guy" characters) as they perform.

=== Storylines ===
The event featured at least three professional wrestling matches with different wrestlers involved in pre-existing scripted feuds, plots and storylines. Wrestlers were portrayed as either heels (referred to as rudos in Mexico, those that portray the "bad guys") or faces (técnicos in Mexico, the "good guy" characters) as they followed a series of tension-building events, which culminated in a wrestling match or series of matches. It is likely that more matches took place but no documentation has been found to confirm what those matches were.

== Results ==
No.	Results	Stipulations	Times
1	Kato Kung Lee, Misterioso and Volador defeated Kung Fu, Blue Panther and Herodes – two falls to one	Best two-out-of-three falls six-man "Lucha Libre rules" tag team match	—
2	Atlantis, Dos Caras and Konnan defeated Los Infernales (El Satánico, MS-1 and Pirata Morgan) – two falls to one	Best two-out-of-three falls six-man "Lucha Libre rules" tag team match	23:03
3	Máscara Año 2000 defeated Aníbal – two falls to one	Best two-out-of-three falls Lucha de Apuestas mask vs. mask match	—
