= Solar II =

Photovoltaic power station in Brahin district, Belarus

- Country: Belarus
- Location: Brahin district
- Coordinates: 51°48′00″N 30°12′20″E
- Status: Operating
- Construction began: March 2016
- Commission date: 19 August 2016
- Owner: Solar Invest

Solar farm
- Type: Standard PV

Power generation
- Nameplate capacity: 22 MW

Solar II (Russian: Солар II) is a photovoltaic power station in the southeastern part of Belarus, located west of the village of Sabali in the Brahin district. The power station occupies an area of 40.3 to 56 ha, with a nominal capacity of over 22 MW and a real capacity of over 18 MW. It was built on land contaminated by the Chernobyl disaster, and its owner is the company Solar Invest, a subsidiary of A1. The power station was constructed in 2016 and until 2017 was the largest installation of its kind in Belarus. The cost of its construction was equivalent to over 23 million euro.

== History ==
During the IX Gomel Economic Forum in 2012, an agreement was signed to establish solar parks for electricity production in the Brahin and Yelsk districts. The investor was the company Solar Invest, established by velcom for the purpose of implementing this project. On 26 April, a site inspection of plots under consideration for the investment took place with the participation of representatives from the Gomel Regional Executive Committee, the district executive committee, the Homielenerha enterprise, and the investor company. In November 2014, the company Homielenerhaservice conducted engineering-geological surveys. Ultimately, the plot selected for the solar farm construction was located west of the village of Sabali in the Burki selsoviet of the Brahin district in the Gomel region.

Construction began in March and was completed in July 2016. The work was mainly carried out by workers from nearby localities of Brahin and Khoiniki. The subcontractor Brahinahraservice was employed, among others, which cleared and leveled the plot. Melioration works were also carried out. The total construction cost amounted to the equivalent of 24 million euro (according to another source – over 23 million euro) and, according to the plan, should return to the investor within 4–5 years. The farm was launched on 19 August 2016, four months ahead of the schedule provided in the contract.

== Characteristics ==
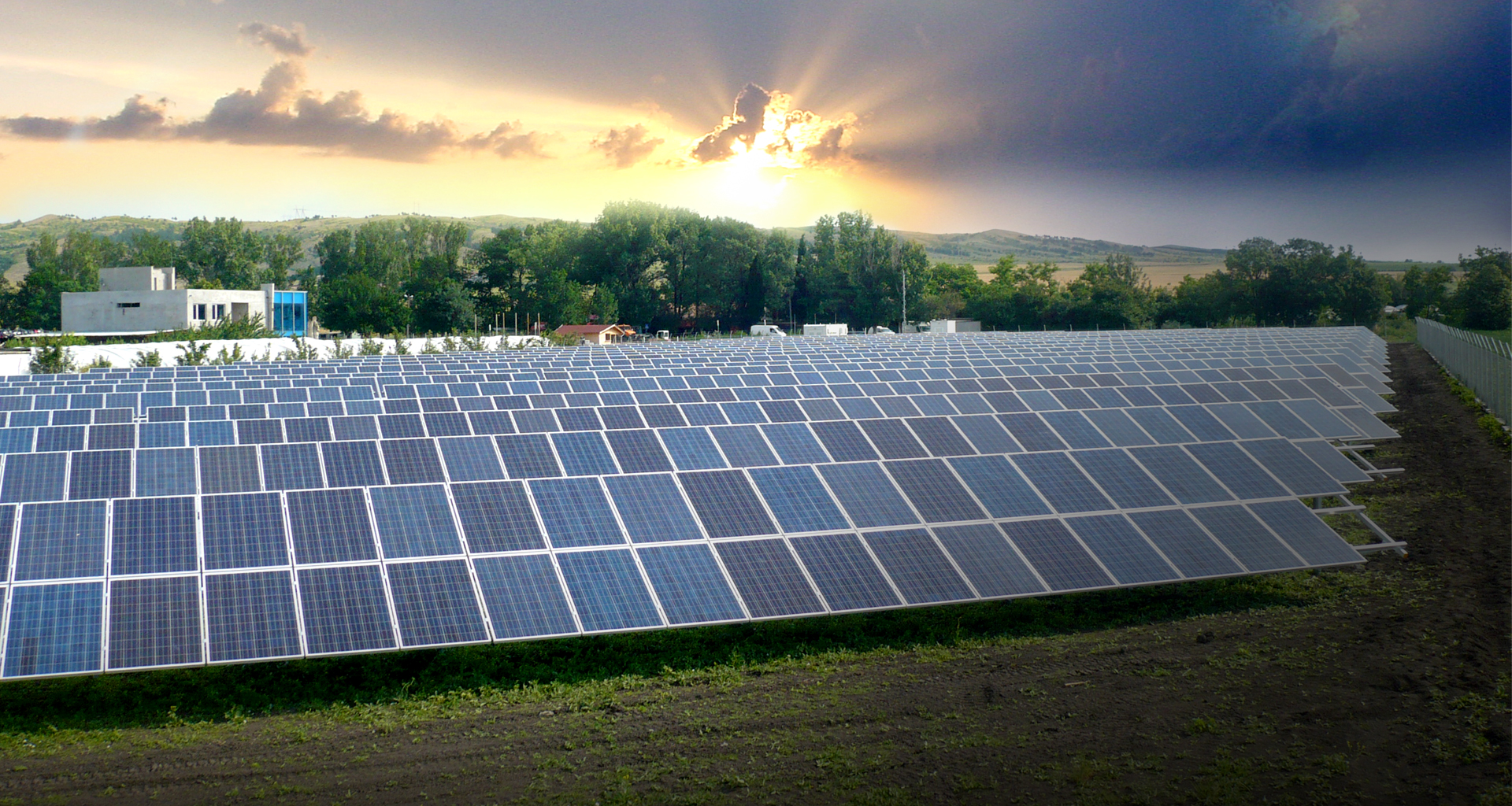
Photovoltaic farm in Bulgaria, of a similar type to Solar II

=== Location ===
The land on which the farm was built belongs to the Brahin district Executive Committee. It was leased for a period of 99 years to the company Solar Invest. These are areas contaminated as a result of the Chernobyl nuclear power plant disaster, several kilometers north of the border of the Polesie State Radioecological Reserve. For this reason, the land lease price there is particularly low. At the same time, it is one of the southernmost parts of Belarus, with an average of 1,900 sunny hours per year. Before the start of the investment, the plot was covered with trees and shrubs. These were remnants of an orchard and forest belts.

=== Technical data ===
The farm consists of 84,164 solar panels (other sources report the number 85 thousand), 617 voltage converters, 10 20 kV transformer substations and a main 110 kV transformer from Siemens. As part of the investment, velcom also built an overhead 110 kV line of 4.5 km length with 22 poles and a transformer, connecting the solar power station to the Brahin electrical substation. In total, over 730 km of electrical cables were used for the farm construction. The farm occupies an area, according to various sources: 40.3 ha, 41 ha or 56 ha. Its total capacity is, according to various sources, from 22.014 MW to 22.3 MW, but realistically reaches from 18.05 to 18.48 MW. At the time of commissioning, it was the largest photovoltaic farm in Belarus both in terms of power and area occupied. However, it maintained its record status only until 2017, when the 55 MW farm in Rechytsa was launched.

=== Mode of operation ===
During the operation of the farm, solar rays are converted by photovoltaic panels into direct electric current. It goes to converters at 0.4 kV, which convert it into alternating current. Then, using transformer substations, the voltage is raised to 20 kV. Using the main transformer, the voltage is further increased to 110 kV, which is necessary for the electricity to reach the grid. Ultimately, using the overhead 110 kV line, the energy is transmitted to the Brahin electrical substation belonging to the Homielenerha enterprise.

== Assessments and awards ==
In media reports, the farm was cited as an example of alternative development of areas affected by the Chernobyl disaster and considered unattractive for business. It was also an example of an investment increasing Belarus' independence from hydrocarbon fuels. It was emphasized that each hour of the farm's operation would allow for the abandonment of 7 thousand cubic meters of natural gas. The ecological dimension of the undertaking was also considered significant.

== See also ==
- Solar power in Belarus
