= NWA World Light Heavyweight Championship =

Professional wrestling championship

- Close up of the championship belt design currently used

Details
- Promotion: National Wrestling Alliance (NWA); Consejo Mundial de Lucha Libre (CMLL)
Statistics
- First champion: Gypsy Joe
- Final champion: Súper Nova
- Most reigns: Ray Mendoza (6 reigns)
- Longest reign: Frank Stojack (1,573 days)
- Shortest reign: Roddy Piper (2 days)
- Oldest champion: Frank Stojack (41 years, 182 days)
- Youngest champion: Gypsy Joe {(Joe Dorsetti)} (18 years, 341 days)
- Heaviest champion: Vampiro (260 lb (120 kg))
- Lightest champion: Tarzan Boy (190 lb (86 kg))

The NWA World Light Heavyweight Championship was a professional wrestling championship sanctioned by the National Wrestling Alliance (NWA). For the majority of its existence the title was promoted by Mexican promotion Consejo Mundial de Lucha Libre (CMLL), where it was known in Spanish as the Campeonato Mundial Semi Completo de NWA. It began as an official National Wrestling Alliance (NWA) title and was given to the NWA's Mexican affiliate, Empresa Mexicana de Lucha Libre (EMLL, later CMLL), to control. The title was also promoted in NWA Hollywood Wrestling until Hollywood Wrestling's closure in 1982. The title remained under the control of EMLL even after EMLL pulled out of the NWA and changed its name to Consejo Mundial de Lucha Libre. Due to its history, it was considered one of the most important titles in EMLL/CMLL. As it was a professional wrestling championship, it was not won legitimately; it was instead won via a scripted ending to a match or awarded to a wrestler because of a storyline. The official definition of the light heavyweight weight class in Mexico is between 92 kg (203 lb) and 97 kg (214 lb), but this was not always strictly enforced. (Note: The most recent case of this was Mephisto's holding the NWA World Welterweight Championship, a belt with a 78 kg (172 lb) upper limit, despite weighing 90 kg (200 lb).)

The first champion was Gypsy Joe, who won the title on November 6, 1952. In 1957 the NWA stripped Frank Stojack of the title for lack of NWA-mandated title defenses, but Stojack kept the physical belt and defended the title for over a year. After Stojack was stripped of the title, the NWA executive board decided to give Salvador Lutteroth and Empresa Mexicana de Lucha Libre control of the championship in 1958. The first champion under Lutteroth's authority was Dory Dixon, who had worked for EMLL for many years. During the late 1970s and early 1980s the title was also defended in the Los Angeles area; after the 1980s, the title was only defended in Mexico.

In March 2010, Blue Demon, Jr., the president of NWA Mexico, sent letters to CMLL, telling them to stop promoting the NWA-branded championships since they were not part of the NWA. NWA Mexico had previously tried to reclaim the three NWA-branded championships promoted by CMLL, but was ignored by CMLL. The promotion did not directly respond to the latest claim either; the NWA Welterweight Champion, Mephisto, commented, simply stating that the titles belonged to CMLL. Finally, on August 12, 2010, CMLL debuted the new NWA World Historic Light Heavyweight Championship and returned the old title to NWA. In 2013, NWA Mexico crowned its first recognized World Light Heavyweight Champion, with Súper Nova winning the vacant title. Súper Nova has not defended the title since 2014, with the championship being de facto retired.

There have been a total of 65 reigns shared between 40 wrestlers. Ray Mendoza has held the Championship the highest number of times with six title reigns; Gory Guerrero's two reigns combined come to 1,963 days, the highest total of any champion. Roddy Piper is the champion with the shortest reign, 2 days; while the longest title reign belongs to Frank Stojack with 1,573 days.

== Title history ==
Key
No.	Overall reign number
Reign	Reign number for the specific champion
Days	Number of days held
N/A	Unknown information
(NLT)	Championship change took place "no later than" the date listed
†	Championship change is unrecognized by the promotion

No.	Champion	Championship change			Reign statistics		Notes	Ref.
No.	Champion	Date	Event	Location	Reign	Days	Notes	Ref.
National Wrestling Alliance (NWA)
1	Gypsy Joe	November 6, 1952	Live event	Des Moines, Iowa	1	277	Gypsy Joe defeated Johnny Balbo in a decision match to become the inaugural champion.	
2	Frank Stojack	August 10, 1953	Live event	Spokane, Washington	1	1,573		^{[G]}
—	Vacated	November 30, 1957	—	—	—	—	Stojack was stripped of the title due to inactivity.	^{[G]}
National Wrestling Alliance (NWA) / Empresa Mexicana de la Lucha Libre (EMLL)
3	Dory Dixon	February 13, 1958	Live event	Mexico City, Mexico	1	575	Dixon defeated Al Kashley to win the vacant championship.	^{[G]}
4	Ray Mendoza	September 11, 1959	Live event	Guadalajara, Jalisco	1	323		^{[G]}
5	Gory Guerrero	July 30, 1960	Live event	Mexico City, Mexico	1	1,102		^{[G]}
6	Ali Bey	August 6, 1963	Live event	El Paso, Texas	1	49		^{[G]}
7	Gory Guerrero	September 24, 1963	Live event	Mexico City, Mexico	2	861		^{[G]}
—	Vacated	February 1, 1966	—	—	—	—	Guerrero was stripped of the title after leaving the promotion; Guerrero kept the physical belt for nine years after being stripped of the championship.	^{[G]}
8	Ray Mendoza	August 4, 1967	Live event	Mexico City, Mexico	2	289	Mendoza defeated Dory Dixon in a tournament final to win the vacant title.	^{[G]}
9	Ángel Blanco	May 19, 1968	Live event	Torreón, Coahuila	1	220		^{[G]}
10	Ray Mendoza	December 25, 1968	Live event	Mexico City, Mexico	3	359		^{[G]}
11	Coloso Colosetti	December 19, 1969	Live event	Mexico City, Mexico	1	91		^{[G]}
12	Ray Mendoza	March 20, 1970	Live event	Mexico City, Mexico	4	252		^{[G]}
13	El Solitario	November 27, 1970	Live event	Mexico City, Mexico	1	476		^{[G]}
14	David Morgan	March 17, 1972	Live event	Mexico City, Mexico	1	35		^{[G]}
15	Ray Mendoza	April 21, 1972	Live event	Mexico City, Mexico	5	53		^{[G]}
16	Alfonso Dantés	June 13, 1972	Live event	Tijuana, Baja California	1	381		^{[G]}
17	Kim Sung Ho	June 29, 1973	Live event	Mexico City, Mexico	1	175		^{[G]}
18	Ray Mendoza	December 21, 1973	Live event	Los Angeles, California	6	208		^{[G]}
—	Vacated	July 17, 1974	—	—	—	—	The championship was vacated when Mendoza left EMLL to form the Universal Wrestling Association.	^{[G]}
19	Dr. Wagner	September 22, 1974	EMLL 41st Anniversary Show	Mexico City, Mexico	1	523	Dr. Wagner defeated El Halcon in a tournament final to win the vacant title.	^{[G]}
20	Adorable Rubí	February 27, 1976	Live event	Mexico City, Mexico	1	140		^{[G]}
21	Carlos Plata	July 16, 1976	Live event	Mexico City, Mexico	1	100		^{[G]}
22	Alfonso Dantés	October 24, 1976	Live event	Guadalajara, Jalisco	2	110		^{[G]}
23	Chavo Guerrero	February 11, 1977	Live event	Los Angeles, California	1	30		^{[G]}
24	Roddy Piper	March 13, 1977	Live event	California	1	2		^{[G]}
25	Chavo Guerrero	March 15, 1977	Live event	Los Angeles, California	2	6		^{[G]}
26	Alfonso Dantés	April 21, 1977	Live event	Mexico City, Mexico	3	407		^{[G]}
27	El Faraón	June 2, 1978	Live event	Mexico City, Mexico	1	193		^{[G]}
28	Pak Choo	December 8, 1978	Live event	Mexico City, Mexico	1	145		^{[G]}
29	Alfonso Dantés	April 30, 1979	Live event	Mexico City, Mexico	4	265		^{[G]}
30	Raul Mata	January 20, 1980	Live event	Guadalajara, Jalisco	1	330		^{[G]}
31	Alfonso Dantés	December 15, 1980	Live event	Mexico City, Mexico	5	112		^{[G]}
32	Tony Salazar	April 3, 1981	Live event	Mexico City, Mexico	1	343		^{[G]}
33	David Morgan	March 12, 1982	Live event	Mexico City, Mexico	2	21		^{[G]}
34	Máscara Año 2000	April 2, 1982	Live event	Mexico City, Mexico	1	228		^{[G]}
35	El Faraón	November 16, 1982	Live event	Mexico City, Mexico	2	60		^{[G]}
36	Ringo Mendoza	January 15, 1983	Live event	Guadalajara, Jalisco	1	194		^{[G]}
37	El Satánico	July 28, 1983	Live event	Mexico City, Mexico	1	87		^{[G]}
38	Ringo Mendoza	October 23, 1983	Live event	Guadalajara, Jalisco	2	479		^{[G]}
39	MS-1	February 13, 1985	Live event	Acapulco, Guerrero	1	39		^{[G]}
40	Rayo de Jalisco, Jr.	June 21, 1985	Live event	Mexico City, Mexico	1	637		^{[G]}
Empresa Mexicana de la Lucha Libre (EMLL)
41	MS-1	March 20, 1987	Live event	Mexico City, Mexico	2	65		^{[G]}
42	Cien Caras	June 24, 1987	Live event	Nezahualcóyotl, Mexico State	1	270		^{[G]}
43	Lizmark	March 20, 1988	Live event	Mexico City, Mexico	1	96		^{[G]}
44	Fabuloso Blondy	June 24, 1988	Live event	Mexico City, Mexico	1	168		^{[G]}
45	Lizmark	December 9, 1988	JUicio Final	Mexico City, Mexico	2	224		^{[G]}
46	El Satánico	July 21, 1989	Live event	Mexico City, Mexico	2	92		^{[G]}
47	Pirata Morgan	October 21, 1989	Live event	Cuernavaca, Morelos	1	116		^{[G]}
47	Fabuloso Blondy	February 14, 1990	Live event	Mexico City, Mexico	2	35		^{[G]}
49	Lizmark	March 21, 1990	Live event	Acapulco, Guerrero	3	249		^{[G]}
50	El Satánico	November 25, 1990	Live event	León, Guanajuato	3	157		^{[G]}
51	Lizmark	May 1, 1991	Live event	Acapulco, Guerrero	4	340		^{[G]}
Consejo Mundial de Lucha Libre (CMLL)
52	El Satánico	April 5, 1992	CMLL Domingos Arena Mexico	Mexico City, Mexico	4	111		^{[G]}
53	Apolo Dantés	July 25, 1992	Live event	Puebla, Puebla	1	243		^{[G]}
54	Jaque Mate	March 25, 1993	Live event	Cuernavaca, Morelos	1	619		^{[G]}
55	El Dandy	December 4, 1994	Live event	Mexico City, Mexico	1	681		^{[G]}
56	Black Warrior	October 15, 1996	Live event	Mexico City, Mexico	1	201		^{[G]}
57	Shocker	May 4, 1997	Live event	Mexico City, Mexico	1	310		^{[G]}
58	Black Warrior	March 10, 1998	Live event	Mexico City, Mexico	2	727		^{[G]}
59	Tarzan Boy	March 6, 2000	Live event	Puebla, Puebla	1	1,070		^{[G]}
60	Vampiro Canadiense	February 9, 2003	Live event	Mexico City, Mexico	1	450		^{[G]}
61	Shocker	May 3, 2004	Live event	Puebla, Puebla	2	349		^{[G]}
—	Vacated	April 17, 2005	—	—	—	—	CMLL stripped Shocker of the title when he did not appear for a scheduled title defense.	
62	Dr. Wagner, Jr.	April 17, 2005	CMLL Domingos De Coliseo	Mexico City, Mexico	1	461	Dr. Wagner, Jr. defeated Último Guerrero in a decision match for the vacant title.	
63	Atlantis	July 22, 2006	Super Viernes	Mexico City, Mexico	1	988		
64	El Texano, Jr.	April 5, 2009	CMLL Guadalajara Domingos	Guadalajara, Jalisco	1	494		
—	Vacated	August 12, 2010	—	—	—	—	The championship was vacated when CMLL returned it to NWA. CMLL replaces the championship with the NWA World Historic Light Heavyweight Championship.	
National Wrestling Alliance (NWA) / NWA Mexico
65	Súper Nova	May 19, 2013	Live event	Blackfoot, Idaho	1	283	Defeated El Hijo de Rey Misterio and Lizmark Jr. in a tournament final. Súper Nova is recognized by NWA Mexico and the International Wrestling Revolution Group (IWRG) but is not recognized by the NWA in the United States. Súper Nova last defended the championship on February 26, 2014 during an IWRG event.	
—	Deactivated	February 26, 2014	—	—	—	—	No known defenses have occurred after this date.	

== Reigns by combined length ==
Key

Symbol	Meaning
†	Indicates the current champion
¤	The exact length of at least one title reign is uncertain, so the shortest possible length is used.
+	Indicates that the date changes daily for the current champion.

Rank	Wrestler	No. of Reigns	Combined Days
1	Gory Guerrero	2	1,963
2	Ray Mendoza	6	1,318¤ (Note: The exact date on which Ray Mendoza vacated the title is unknown, which means the title reign lasted between 42 and 69 days.)
3	Alfonso Dantés	5	1,275
4	Apolo Dantés	1	1,098
5	Tarzan Boy	1	1,031¤ (Note: The exact date on which Tarzan Boy vacated the title is unknown, which means the title reign lasted between 1,031 and 1,069 days.)
6	Atlantis	1	988
7	Black Warrior	2	928
8	Lizmark	4	909
9	El Dandy	1	681
10	Ringo Mendoza	2	673
11	Rayo de Jalisco, Jr.	1	637
12	Jaque Mate	1	619
13	Shocker	3	553¤ (Note: The exact date on which Shocker vacates the title is unknown, which means the title reign lasted between 243 and 349 days.)
14	Dr. Wagner	1	523
15	Fabuloso Blondy	2	511
16	El Texano, Jr.	1	494
17	El Solitario	1	476
18	Dr. Wagner, Jr.	1	461
19	Vampiro Canadiense	1	450
20	El Satánico	4	447
21	Tony Salazar	1	343
22	Raul Mata	1	330
23	Súper Nova	1	283¤
24	Gypsy Joe	1	277
25	Cien Caras	1	270
26	El Faraón	2	253
27	Adorable Rubí	1	231
28	Máscara Año 2000	1	228
29	Ángel Blanco	1	220
30	Dory Dixon	1	210
31	Kim Sung Ho	1	175
32	Pak Choo	1	145
33	Pirata Morgan	1	116
34	MS-1	1	104
35	Carlos Plata	1	100
36	Coloso Colosetti	1	91
37	David Morgan	2	56
38	Ali Bey	1	49
39	Chavo Guerrero	2	36
40	Roddy Piper	1	2

== Footnotes ==
- The NWA endorsed another NWA World Light Heavyweight Championship in New Jersey in 1997 and 1998, referred to as the "New Jersey version"; this short-lived title was not connected to the CMLL version.

== See also ==
- List of National Wrestling Alliance championships
