= Ken Timbs =

American professional wrestler (1951–2004)

Personal information
- Born: January 27, 1951 Atlanta, Georgia, U.S.
- Died: August 1, 2004

Professional wrestling career
- Ring name(s): Ken Timbs; The Assassin; El Gringo Loco; Fabuloso Blonde; The Raider; Mr. Class
- Billed height: 5 ft 11 in (180 cm)
- Billed weight: 220 lb (100 kg)
- Trained by: Gene Anderson; Ole Anderson
- Debut: 1978

Ken Timbs (January 27, 1951 – August 1, 2004) was an American professional wrestler who, with tag team partner Eric Embry, competed as one half of the Fabulous Blondes in several regional territories including Southwest Championship Wrestling and International World Class Championship Wrestling during the early 1980s.

== Professional wrestling career ==
Ken Timbs began his professional wrestling career in Ole Anderson's Georgia Championship Wrestling promotion. He later moved to Southwest Championship Wrestling, where he teamed as the Fabulous Blondes with Eric Embry when he feuded with The Rock 'n' Roll Express. In 1983, the duo won the SCW World Tag Team Championship from Buddy Moreno and Scott Casey. Approximately two months later, the titles were held up after a match with the Rock 'n' Roll Express due to interference by Leslie Luv who moved to the East Coast. The Blondes won the rematch in early December. In April 1984, Al Perez and Manny Fernandez won the Tag Titles, but the Blondes were awarded the belts after Perez and Fernandez missed a title defense. He was later replaced in the team by Dan Greer.

In November 1985, Timbs was awarded the NWA United States Junior Heavyweight Championship after breaking his opponent's leg with a submission hold. Along with his new partner Porkchop Cash, Timbs won the NWA Central States Tag Team Championship in April 1987. The title was vacated when Timbs left the area.

Timbs teamed with Dusty Wolfe as The Hollywood Blondes for Championship Wrestling from Florida, until he arrived in Mexico's Empresa Mexicana de la Lucha Libre in May 1988. As the Fabuloso Blonde, he defeated Lizmark for the NWA World Light Heavyweight Championship on June 24, 1988. He was the first foreigner to hold the title in twelve years. Lizmark, however, regained the title in December. In February 1990, Timbs once again injured an opponent. During his match against Pirata Morgan, Timbs separated Morgan's shoulder and defeated him to regain the NWA World Light Heavyweight title. One month later, Lizmark once again defeated Timbs for the title.

He then spent several years in Mexican and South American promotions, winning the Guatemalan Heavyweight Championship. In 1991, he defeated Astro de Oro for the Championship Wrestling from Central America Intercontinental Heavyweight Title, in the process breaking Oro's leg. He eventually returned to his home state of Georgia, wrestling as the masked wrestler The Assassin during the 1990s. He lost the Championship Wrestling from Central America Intercontinental Heavyweight Title to Skeletor in December 1992 in a mask vs. title match.

== Personal life ==
Timbs entered the wrestling business after being employed as police officer and security guard for wrestling shows in the state of Georgia. He began training after becoming friends with several of the wrestlers.

Timbs has sons. One is Ken, Jr. who is also on the independent circuit in the Southeast region.

After a long illness, Timbs died from cardiomyopathy and congestive heart failure on August 1, 2004, at the age of 53. Before his death, Timbs had been married to a woman named Juanita, with whom he had one daughter and eight sons. Also prior to his death, Timbs had been a frequent correspondent on the website OldSchoolWrestling.com, a website that he founded in 2001.

== Championships and accomplishments ==
- Central States Wrestling
  - NWA Central States Tag Team Championship (1 time) – with Porkchop Cash
- Consejo Mundial de Lucha Libre
  - NWA World Light Heavyweight Championship (2 times)
- Continental Championship Wrestling
  - NWA Southeastern United States Junior Heavyweight Championship (1 time)
- Federación Internacional de Lucha Libre
  - FILL World Light Heavyweight Championship (1 time)
- Pro Wrestling Illustrated
  - PWI ranked him #261 of the top 500 singles wrestlers in the PWI 500 in 1991
  - PWI ranked him #243 of the top 500 singles wrestlers in the PWI 500 in 1992
- Southwest Championship Wrestling
  - SCW Southwest Tag Team Championship (3 times) - with Eric Embry
