= Rayo de Jalisco Jr. =

Mexican professional wrestler

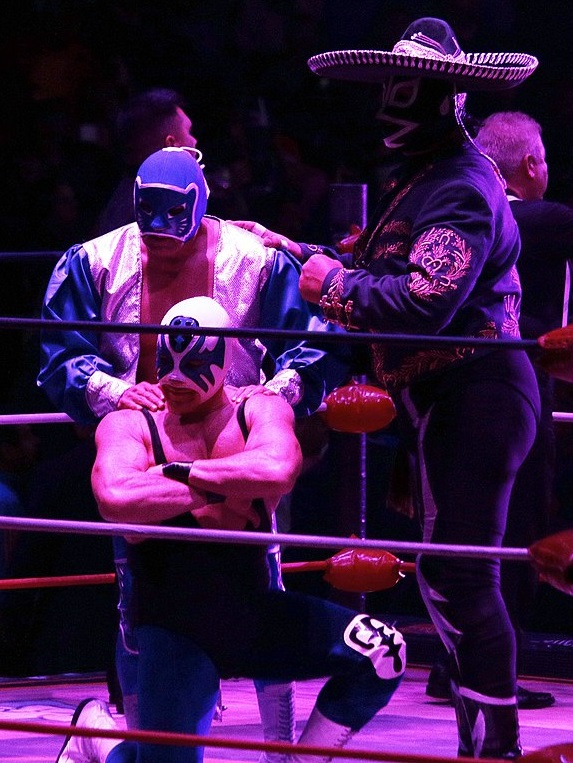
- Rayo de Jalisco Jr. (right), Atlantis (middle) and Blue Panther (left) in 2018

Personal information
- Born: Unrevealed; January 1, 1960 (age 66) Guadalajara, Jalisco, Mexico
- Children: Rayman (son)
- Parent: Rayo de Jalisco (father)
- Relatives: Tony Sugar (uncle); Black Sugar (uncle)

Professional wrestling career
- Ring name(s): Rayman; Rayo de Jalisco Jr. Rayo de Jalisco
- Billed height: 186 cm (6 ft 1 in)
- Billed weight: 115 kg (254 lb)
- Billed from: Guadalajara, Jalisco, Mexico
- Trained by: Rayo de Jalisco; Diablo Velazco
- Debut: November 11, 1975; Tlaquepaque, Jalisco

Rayo de Jalisco Jr. (Spanish: "Lightning Bolt from Jalisco Jr."; born January 1, 1960) is a Mexican professional wrestler. He is currently performing as a freelancer on the Mexican independent circuit, and is best known for his longtime association with Consejo Mundial de Lucha Libre (CMLL).

A second-generation wrestler, Rayo de Jalisco Jr. is the son of Rayo de Jalisco, a famous wrestler from the early days of lucha libre; he also has a son who wrestles under the name Rayman. Rayo de Jalisco Jr. is a two-time CMLL World Heavyweight Champion and WWA World Heavyweight Champion, a title he held from March 21, 2003 to 2011. His real name is not a matter of public record, as is often the case with masked wrestlers in Mexico, where their private lives are kept a secret from the wrestling fans.

== Early life ==
Rayo de Jalisco Jr. was born on January 1, 1960, in Guadalajara, the son of legendary professional wrestler Rayo de Jalisco and the nephew of professional wrestlers Tony Sugar and Black Sugar. He was not initially trained by his father as his father did not want his son to follow into his profession; instead he trained under Diablo Velazco.

== Professional wrestling career ==
The future Rayo de Jalisco Jr. turned professional at the age of 15 and initially wrestled under the name "Rayman" to keep his father from finding out he was wrestling. After working as a wrestler for a year he finally revealed to his father that he was wrestling and that he was serious. After seeing his son wrestle, Rayo de Jalisco Sr. decided to allow his son to work as "Rayo de Jalisco Jr." and wear the lightning bolt mask that was synonymous with the Rayo de Jalisco character. Rayo de Jalisco Jr. worked most of the 1970s alongside his father, receiving further training along the way. By the early 1980s he was working for Empresa Mexicana de Lucha Libre (EMLL), Mexico's largest professional wrestling promotion. In 1982, Rayo de Jalisco Jr. began a wrestling storyline, called a feud, with MS-1 that ended when Rayo de Jalisco Jr. defeated MS-1 in a Luchas de Apuestas, mask vs. mask match to unmask the hated rudo ("bad guy"). Throughout the early 1980s, Rayo de Jalisco Jr. teamed up with equally popular Cien Caras to form a very successful team, working main events all over Mexico. On January 8, 1984, Rayo de Jalisco Jr. captured his first singles championship as he defeated Pirata Morgan to win the Mexican National Heavyweight Championship. His first championship success also led to his greatest rivalry as Cien Caras turned on Rayo de Jalisco Jr. in his quest to win the Mexican National Heavyweight Title. Cien Caras defeated his former teammate for the title on March 30, 1984. On June 21, 1985, Rayo de Jalisco Jr. defeated MS-1 to capture the NWA World Light Heavyweight Championship in the main event of an Arena Mexico show. In November 1985, Rayo de Jalisco Jr. teamed with Ringo Mendoza and the Kiss to win the Mexican National Trios Championship from Los Brazos (El Brazo, Brazo de Oro and Brazo de Plata). The trio held the title for 275 days before losing it to Pirata Morgan, Jerry Estrada and Hombre Bala. On March 20, 1987, Rayo de Jalisco's 637-day reign as NWA World Light Heavyweight Champion ended as he lost to MS-1. By 1990, the storyline between Rayo de Jalisco Jr. and Cien Caras became so heated that they were the main event of EMLL's 57th Anniversary show in a Luchas de Apuestas, mask vs. mask match. Rayo de Jalisco Jr. defeated Cien Caras two falls to one and forced Cien Caras to unmask.

Over the next couple of years, Rayo de Jalisco Jr. won the Mexican National Heavyweight Title on a further two occasions, defeating Gran Markus Jr. and El Egipico to win the title. His third and final reign ended on February 21, 1994, when he lost to Pierroth Jr. On November 3, 1995, Rayo de Jalisco Jr. and Atlantis teamed up to win the CMLL World Tag Team Championship from The Headhunters. The duo successfully defended it against Máscara Año 2000 and Universo 2000, and against Apolo Dantés and El Canek. On August 6, 1996, Gran Markus Jr. and El Hijo del Gladiador won the title from Rayo de Jalisco Jr. and Atlantis. On April 14, 1996, Rayo de Jalisco Jr. won the CMLL World Heavyweight Championship from Apolo Dantés, the highest singles championship in the company. He made three successful defenses against the former champion Apolo Dantés, as well as thwarting the challenges of Gran Markus Jr. and Máscara Año 2000. On April 18, 1997, Rayo de Jalisco Jr. lost the title to Steel after a slow building storyline between the two. In 1997, Steel left CMLL to work for the World Wrestling Federation (WWF) as "Val Venis", ending the storyline with Rayo de Jalisco Jr. without a satisfactory conclusion. CMLL convinced the WWF to let Steel return to CMLL for a brief visit, just long enough to lose a Luchas de Apuestas to Rayo de Jalisco Jr. giving him another mask win. A few months after unmasking Steel, Rayo de Jalisco Jr. became a two-time CMLL World Heavyweight Champion when he defeated Universo 2000 for the belt. He successfully defended the championship against Cien Caras and Mascara Año 2000, before losing it back to Universo 2000. Rayo de Jalisco Jr. was injured in the match against Universo 2000, as a mistimed tombstone piledriver injured his neck, forcing him out of the ring for over six months and almost causing him to retire.

In 2001, Rayo de Jalisco Jr. dropped the "Junior" part of his name as his son, who had wrestled for two years, took the "Rayo de Jalisco" name, sometimes billed as el Hijo de Rayo de Jalisco Jr. ("the son of Rayo de Jalisco Jr.") and other times simply Rayo de Jalisco Jr.. The confusing name changes only lasted for a couple of months, before his son changed his name to Hombre sin Nombre ("the man without name"), as part of a storyline where the son was trying to get out from the father's shadow. His son would later begin working as "Rayman", the same name that Rayo de Jalisco Jr. originally used. Since 2003, Rayo de Jalisco Jr. has not worked for CMLL on a regular basis, instead he works for a number of promotions of the Mexican independent circuit. On March 21, 2003, Rayo de Jalisco Jr. won the WWA World Heavyweight Championship, defeating Rey Misterio Sr. in the finals of a tournament to crown a new champion. Rayo de Jalisco Jr. still holds that title to this day, 23 years, 166 days later. In 2004, Rayo de Jalisco Jr. made a brief return to CMLL teaming up with Black Warrior and El Canek to win the CMLL World Trios Championship from Dr. Wagner Jr., Universo 2000, and Black Tiger (III). The team quickly lost the title to Héctor Garza, Tarzan Boy, and El Terrible. In 2005, Rayo de Jalisco Jr. suffered another serious injury when he injured both his knees in a match against Máscara Año 2000; his legs got caught on the ropes as he jumped out of the ring and he tore ligaments in both knees. The injury kept him out of the ring for almost half a year but he made a full recovery and returned to the ring. Rayo de Jalisco Jr. made his return to CMLL in May 2010, siding with the CMLL loyalists in their feud with Los Invasores, especially Invasore members Universo 2000 and Máscara Año 2000, reigniting the long-running storyline between them. Rayo de Jalisco Jr. only worked a few matches for CMLL in mid-2010 but returned to the promotion in early 2013. He was on hand for a press conference, announcing that CMLL's annual Homenaje a Dos Leyendas show would pay tribute to his father, Rayo de Jalisco Sr. During the press conference, he was confronted by longtime rival Universo 2000, who challenged him to a match for the Dos Leyendas show. At the show, Rayo de Jalisco Jr., Shocker and Rush defeated Universo 2000, Mr. Niebla and El Terrible by disqualification. Two days later, on March 17, 2013, Rayo de Jalisco Jr. competed in a four-way, steel cage match billed by IWRG as Prison Fatal ("Deadly Prison") against Cien Caras Jr., Máscara Año 2000 Jr. and Pirata Morgan. During the match, Hijo de Máscara Año 2000 interfered, which caused Pirata Morgan Jr. to enter the match as well to escalate the rivalry between Los Piratas and Los Capos Junior. The match ended with Pirata Morgan being the last man in the cage and thus had his hair shaved off.

== Championships and accomplishments ==
- Consejo Mundial de Lucha Libre
  - CMLL World Heavyweight Championship (2 times)
  - CMLL World Tag Team Championship (1 time) – with Atlantis
  - CMLL World Trios Championship (1 time) – with El Canek and Black Warrior
  - Mexican National Heavyweight Championship (3 times)
  - Mexican National Tag Team Championship (1 time) – with Tony Benetto
  - Mexican National Trios Championship (1 time) – with Ringo Mendoza and El Kiss
  - NWA World Light Heavyweight Championship (1 time)
  - Copa de Arena Mexico: 2002 – Black Warrior and Lizmark Jr.
  - International Gran Prix (1994)
- Federación Internacional de Lucha Libre
  - FILL Heavyweight Championship (1 time)
- Nueva Generación Lucha Libre
  - NGLLHeavyweight Championship (1 time, current)
- World Wrestling Association
  - WWA World Heavyweight Championship (1 time, current)
  - WWA Tag Team Championship (1 time) – with Rayman

== Luchas de Apuestas record ==
Winner (wager)	Loser (wager)	Location	Event	Date	Notes
Rayo de Jalisco Jr. (mask)	Martín Escobedo (hair)	N/A	Live event	N/A	
Rayo de Jalisco Jr. (mask)	Herodes (hair)	N/A	Live event	N/A	
Rayo de Jalisco Jr. (mask) and El Jalisco (hair)	MS-1 (mask) and Carlos Plata (hair)	Mexico City	Live event	July 2, 1982	
Rayo de Jalisco Jr. (mask)	Gorila Asesino (mask)	Puebla, Puebla	Live event	April 10, 1983	
Rayo de Jalisco Jr. (mask)	El Egipcio (mask)	Mexico City	Juicio Final	December 9, 1983	(Note: Relevos suicida match: Hombre Bala and Masakre defeated the team to force them to fight each other for their masks.)
Rayo de Jalisco Jr. (mask)	Super Halcón (mask)	Mexico City	Live event	April 23, 1989	
Rayo de Jalisco Jr. (mask)	Cien Caras (mask)	Mexico City	EMLL 57th Anniversary Show	September 21, 1990	
Rayo de Jalisco Jr. (mask)	Steel (mask)	Mexico City	Live event	June 8, 1998	
Rayo de Jalisco Jr. (mask)	Cien Caras (hair)	Lagos de Moreno, Jalisco	Live event	November 29, 1999	
Rayo de Jalisco Jr. (mask)	Gran Markus Jr. (hair)	Guadalajara, Jalisco	Live event	January 30, 2000	
Rayo de Jalisco Jr. (mask)	Dr. Muerte (mask)	Mexico City	Live event	June 9, 2001	
Rayo de Jalisco Jr. (mask)	Comando Asesino (mask)	Guadalajara, Jalisco	Live event	July 2002	(Note: Relevos suicida match: El Charro and Sancara defeated the team to force them to fight for their mask.)
Rayo de Jalisco Jr. (mask)	Yankee Star (mask)	Ciudad Madero, Tamaulipas	Live event	June 20, 2003	
Rayo de Jalisco Jr. (mask)	Senor Muerte (mask)	Guadalajara, Jalisco	Live event	December 7, 2003	
Rayo de Jalisco Jr. (mask)	Sombra de Jalisco (mask)	Monterrey, Nuevo León	Live event	April 18, 2004	(Note: Match also included Villano III and Jerry Estrada)
Rayo de Jalisco Jr. (mask)	Enterrador 2000 (mask)	Mexico City	Live event	November 2, 2007	(Note: Last two competitors in a multi-man cage match.)
Rayo de Jalisco Jr. (mask)	Super Parka (hair)	Tijuana, Baja California	Live event	December 6, 2013	
