= Máscara Año 2000 =

Mexican wrestler (born 1958)

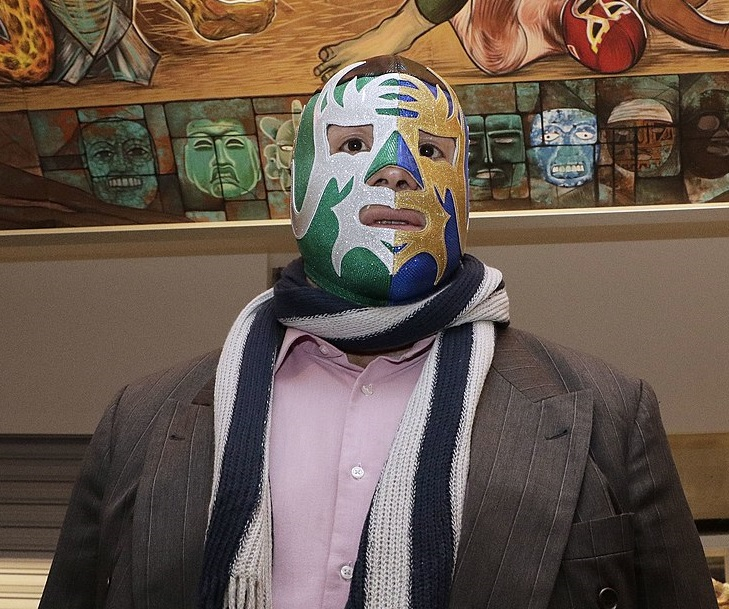
- Masked in November 2018

Personal information
- Born: Jesús Reyes González; 10 March 1958 (age 68)

Professional wrestling career
- Ring name(s): Titán; Máscara Año 2000; El Hombre de Negro
- Billed height: 1.79 m (5 ft 10 1/2 in)
- Billed weight: 97 kg (214 lb)
- Trained by: Diablo Velasco
- Debut: 27 November 1977

Jesús Reyes González (born 10 March 1958) is a Mexican professional wrestler, best known under the ring name Máscara Año 2000 or Máscara Año Dos Mil. His ring name is Spanish for "Mask of the year 2000", originally referring to the mask Reyes wore while wrestling. Reyes was forced to unmask when he lost a Lucha de Apuesta (bet match) to Perro Aguayo in 1993. Throughout his career Reyes has often teamed with his two brothers Carmelo, who wrestles as Cien Caras and the late Andrés, who wrestled as Universo 2000, the three were collectively known as Los Hermanos Dinamita ("The Dynamite Brothers") or Los Capos ("The Bosses") when they teamed with Apolo Dantés. Reyes has earned the nickname "El Padre de más de 20" ("Father of more than 20") by wrestling commentators even though he does not quite have 20 children.

== Professional wrestling career ==
Jesús Reyes was the second of the Reyes brothers to take up professional wrestling, making his debut in 1977, only a few years after his older brother Carmelo Reyes González who wrestled under the ring name "Cien Caras". Reyes took the name Titán, an enmascarado, or masked, ring character. He would later change his ring name to "Máscara Año 2000", "The Mask of the year 2000", a name he would be best known under.

=== Empresa Mexicana de Lucha Libre (1977–1992) ===
Both Reyes brothers worked regularly for Empresa Mexicana de Lucha Libre (EMLL) from the early 1980s and they also brought in their younger brother who worked as Universo 2000 to form a trio billed as Los Hermanos Dinamita ("The Dynamite Brothers"). On 16 April 1986 Máscara Año 2000 and Cien Caras defeated Rayo de Jalisco and Tony Benetto to win the Mexican National Tag Team Championship. They held and successfully defended the title for almost a year before losing it to Los Infernales (MS-1 and Masakre) on 26 March 1987. Universo 2000 was originally chosen to be the wrestler to unmask the legendary Aníbal, who had returned for the big payday a mask loss is. But during the buildup promoter Benjamin Mora, who was bitter at EMLL for not working with him, revealed several of EMLL's plans including who was going to unmask Aníbal. CMLL decided to change their plans and in the end it was Máscara Año 2000, that was given the victory over Aníbal. In late 1990-early 1991 EMLL changed their name to Consejo Mundial de Lucha Libre (CMLL). On 11 August 1991 Los Hermanos Dinamita won the Mexican National Trios Championship when they defeated Los Movie Stars (Atlantis, Máscara Sagrada and Octagón) to win the title.

=== Asistencia Asesoría y Administración (1992–1995) ===
In mid-1992 then CMLL booker Antonio Peña decided to break away from the promotion and form his own promotion called Asistencia Asesoría y Administración, wanting to produce his own style of wrestling shows that differed from the very conservative way CMLL ran things. Among the people that left CMLL to join AAA were the Reyes brothers, who took the Mexican National Trios title with them, this was made possible by the fact that CMLL did not outright own the championship but were given the rights to book the championship by the Mexico City Boxing and Wrestling Commission who actually owned all of the Mexican National wrestling championships. The Commission allowed Peña's promotion to take control of the titles after its creation in 1992. Máscara Año 2000 had begun a feud with Perro Aguayo while both still worked for CMLL and the storyline tension between the two continued as they both jumped to AAA. The two faced off in the semi-main event of the first-ever Triplemanía in a Lucha de Apuesta, mask vs. hair match. The show saw Aguayo defeat his longtime rival to unmask him. Los Hermanos Dinamita held the trios championship until July 1993 when Los Infernales (Satánico, Pirata Morgan and MS-1) defeated them. Los Hermanos Dinamita regained the belts in late 1993 or very early 1994 by defeating Los Infernales. In the spring of 1994 Los Hermanos Dinamita began a feud with the Rudo (bad guy) trio Los Payasos, a trio of masked "evil clowns" (Coco Rojo, Coco Verde and Coco Amarillo) who underneath the clown costumes were very accomplished wrestlers. The two trios met in a match at Triplemanía II-A on 24 April 1994 where Los Payasos won the Trios title from Los Hermanos Dinamita. A few weeks later, at Triplemanía II-C Los Hermanos Dinamita gained a measure of revenge when they defeated Los Payasos in a Steel Cage Match. One of Universo 2000's last matches in AAA took place at Triplemanía III-C where Los Hermanos Dinamita teamed up with Jerry Estrada and Fishman to defeat Konnan, La Parka, Máscara Sagrada, Latin Lover and Perro Aguayo.

=== Return to CMLL (1995–2008, 2016–present) ===
By mid-1996 Los Hermanos left AAA and returned to CMLL where they would become regular competitors for the next decade. The trio began working regularly with Apolo Dantés, forming a group called Los Capos ("The Bosses"), a rudo group that were heavily featured in CMLL's heavyweight division. Around 2000 Los Capos began a long running feud with Perro Aguayo, a storyline that would later include Aguayo's son Perro Aguayo Jr. as well. On 30 March 2001, in the main event of CMLL's Juicio Final, Universo 2000 faced Aguayo in a Lucha de Apuesta match where Aguayo risked his hair and Universo 2000 risked his mask. Universo 2000 won, with a little help from Los Capos, and shaved Aguayo bald after the match. Four years later Aguayo and his son defeated Cien Caras and Máscara Año 2000 in a Lucha de Apuesta, hair vs. hair match, in what turned out to be the last headline match of the feud between the Reyes and the Aguaryo families. Máscara Año 2000 remained with CMLL until some point in 2007 or 2008 where he left the promotion and began working on the independent circuit.

=== Los Invasores and independent circuit (2008–present) ===
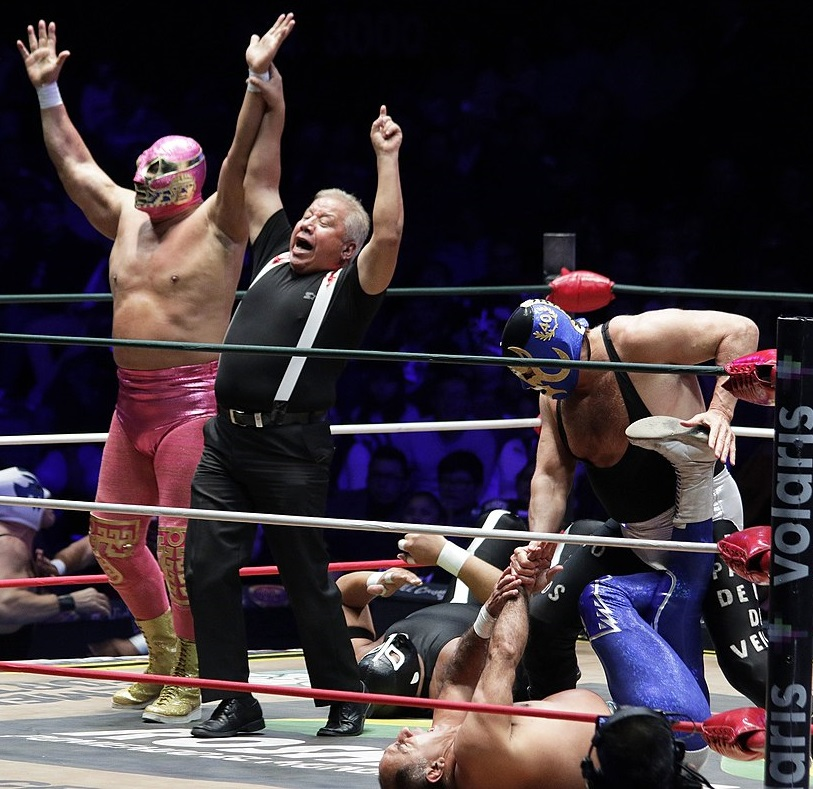
Máscara Año 2000 apply a submission move (right) as El Canek celebrates a victory

Máscara Año 2000 currently wrestles select dates on the independent circuit, occasional appearances for International Wrestling Revolution Group (IWRG), often teaming with his brother Universo 2000 or his sons Máscara Año 2000 Jr. and El Hijo de Máscara Año 2000. On 10 May 2010, during a match between Los Independientes and CMLL wrestlers, Máscara Año 2000 and Universo 2000 ran in to help Los Independientes beat up on their opponents. The two sided with Los Independientes (Later renamed Los Invasores) in the storyline between independent wrestlers and CMLL.

=== Return to AAA (2012–2013) ===
On 11 March 2012, Máscara Año 2000 made his return to AAA, working as the masked "El Hombre de Negro", an accomplice of the rudo stable El Consejo, which also included his son Máscara Año 2000 Jr. After months of helping members of El Consejo win matches, including one for the AAA World Trios Championship, El Hombre de Negro unmasked and revealed his true identity on 16 June. On 5 August at Triplemanía XX, Máscara Año 2000 accompanied his son to a match, where he lost his mask to Dr. Wagner Jr.

== The Reyes wrestling family ==
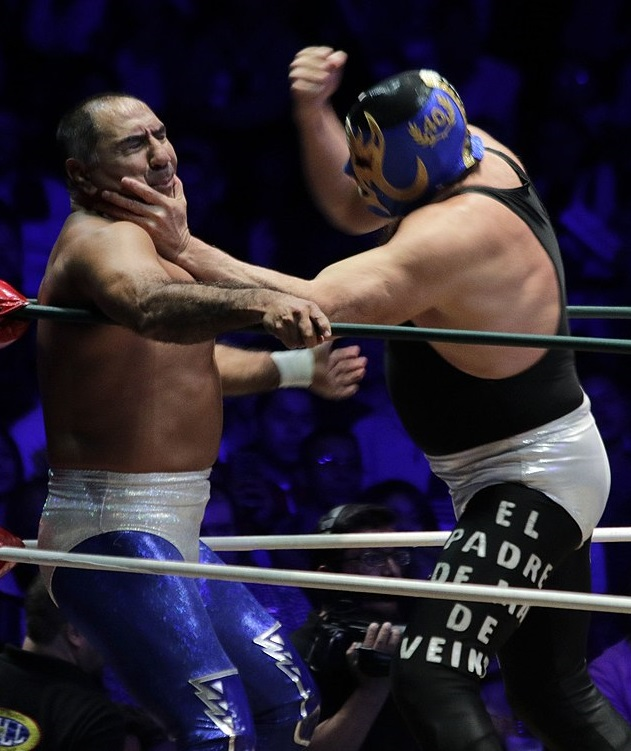
Jesús Reyes wearing tights with his "The father of more than 20" nickname

Jesús Reyes González is the second youngest of the Reyes brothers to turn professional, his older brother Carmelo Reyes González wrestled as "Cien Caras" for many years and retired in 2005. His younger brother, Andrés Reyes, who wrestled as Universo 2000 died in 2018. Wrestlers Mascara Año 2000 Jr and Hijo de Mascara Año 2000 are not actually Reyes' sons. Mascara Año 2000 is allegedly not related to the Dinamitas, but Hijo de Mascara Año 2000 is a nephew, being the son of Carmelo, Jesus and Andres' sister. Despite using the names El Hijo de Cien Caras ("The Son of Cien Caras") and Cien Caras Jr. neither wrestler actually are related to the Reyes family but have paid them for the rights to use the ring characters and masks. The Mini-Estrella Pequeño Universo 2000 is also not a Reyes family member but a Mini who was allowed to use the name and mask some years ago when Universo 2000 still wrestled in CMLL and continues to use the character to this date. Cien Caras' biological children, Sanson and Cuatrero, also wrestle in CMLL with their cousin Forastero (son of the Dinamitas' sister). The trio was joined in 2017 by Universo 2000 Jr, the biological son of Universo 2000. Máscara Año 2000 is nicknamed "The father of more than 20", although it's not certain if that name has any hold in real life.

== Championships and accomplishments ==
- Asistencia Asesoría y Administración
  - IWC World Heavyweight Championship (1 time)
- Empresa Mexicana de la Lucha Libre
  - Mexican National Tag Team Championship (1 time) – with Cien Caras
  - Mexican National Trios Championship (2 times) – with Cien Caras and Universo 2000
  - NWA World Light Heavyweight Championship (1 time)
  - Copa Bobby Bonales (2018)
- Wrestling Observer Newsletter
  - Wrestling Observer Newsletter Hall of Fame (2024) - with Cien Caras and Universo 2000

== Luchas de Apuestas record ==
Winner (wager)	Loser (wager)	Location	Event	Date	Notes
Máscara Año 2000 (mask)	Pirata Morgan (hair)	Mexico City	Live event	N/A	
Máscara Año 2000 (mask)	Carlos Plata (hair)	N/A	Live event	N/A	
Máscara Año 2000 (mask)	Super Brazo (hair)	N/A	Live event	N/A	
Máscara Año 2000 (mask)	Red Skin (mask)	N/A	Live event	N/A	
Máscara Año 2000 (mask)	Asesino Negro (mask)	N/A	Live event	N/A	
Máscara Año 2000 (mask)	Ángel del Silencio (mask)	Guadalajara, Jalisco	Live event	N/A	
Máscara Año 2000 (mask)	Black Master (mask)	Monterrey, Nuevo León	Live event	9 July 1978	
Máscara Año 2000 (mask)	Gran Coloso (mask)	Mexico City	EMLL show	8 December 1985	
Máscara Año 2000 (mask)	Mogur (mask)	Mexico City	EMLL 55th Anniversary Show	23 September 1988	
Máscara Año 2000 (mask)	Aníbal (mask)	Mexico City	Juicio Final	13 December 1991	
Perro Aguayo (hair)	Máscara Año 2000 (mask)	Mexico City	Triplemanía I	30 April 1993	
Máscara Año 2000 (hair)	Brazo de Plata (hair)	Mexico City	Live event	7 August 1998	
Emilio Charles Jr. and Máscara Año 2000 (hair)	Ricky Santana and El Boricua (hair)	Mexico City	CMLL show	25 September 1998	
Villano III (hair)	Máscara Año 2000 (hair)	Mexico City	Entre Torre Infernal	4 August 2000	(Note: Steel cage match that also included Perro Aguayo and Pierroth Jr.)
Perro Aguayo (hair)	Máscara Año 2000 (hair)	Tijuana, Baja California	Live event	2 February 2001	
Máscara Año 2000 (hair)	Justiciero (hair)	Coacalco, State of Mexico	Live event	1 December 2001	
Pierroth Jr. (hair)	Máscara Año 2000 (hair)	Mexico City	CMLL show	27 September 2002	
Shocker (hair)	Máscara Año 2000 (hair)	Puebla, Puebla	CMLL show	14 July 2003	
Máscara Año 2000 (hair)	El Satánico (hair)	Mexico City	CMLL show	5 December 2003	(Note: Steel cage match that also included Negro Casas and Tarzan Boy)
Perro Aguayo Jr. and El Terrible (hair)	Cien Caras and Máscara Año 2000 (hair)	Mexico City	Homenaje a Dos Leyendas	19 March 2004	
Cien Caras and Máscara Año 2000 (hair)	Pierroth Jr. and Vampiro (hair)	Mexico City	CMLL show	17 December 2004	
Perro Aguayo and Perro Aguayo Jr. (hair)	Cien Caras and Máscara Año 2000 (hair)	Mexico City	Homenaje a Dos Leyendas	18 March 2005	
Rey Bucanero (hair)	Máscara Año 2000 (hair)	Leon, Guanajuato	Live event	7 August 2006	
Lizmark Jr. (hair)	Máscara Año 2000 (hair)	Acapulco, Guerrero	Live event	11 April 2007	
L.A. Park (mask)	Máscara Año 2000 (hair)	Cuernavaca, Morelos	Live event	1 November 2007	
Dr. Wagner Jr. (mask)	Máscara Año 2000 (hair)	Puebla, Puebla	Live event	7 March 2009	(Note: Last two men in a Steel cage match that also included Universo 2000.)
Máscara Año 2000 (hair)	Pirata Morgan (hair)	Naucalpan, State of Mexico	Live event	19 December 2010	
Máximo Sexy (hair)	Máscara Año 2000 (hair)	Mexico City, Mexico	Sin Piedad	1 January 2017	
Último Guerrero (hair)	Máscara Año 2000 (hair)	Mexico City	Juicio Final	31 May 2019	
