= Lizmark =

Mexican professional wrestler (1950 – 2015)

- Lizmark during a match

Personal information
- Born: Juan Baños; December 18, 1950 Santiago Llano Grande, Oaxaca, Mexico
- Died: December 16, 2015 (aged 64)
- Cause of death: Respiratory failure

Professional wrestling career
- Ring name: Lizmark
- Billed height: 1.73 m (5 ft 8 in)
- Billed weight: 93 kg (205 lb)
- Billed from: Acapulco, Guerrero, Mexico
- Trained by: Braulio Mendoza; Abundio Radilla; Hércules
- Debut: March 14, 1976
- Retired: 2013

Juan Baños (December 18, 1950 – December 16, 2015) was a Mexican professional wrestler better known by the ring name Lizmark. The name was taken from the German battleship Bismarck. He was a multiple-time champion, having held singles and tag team championships in both Empresa Mexicana de Lucha Libre / Consejo Mundial de Lucha Libre (EMLL/CMLL) and Asistencia Asesoría y Administración (AAA). In 2001, Lizmark was inducted into the Wrestling Observer Newsletter Hall of Fame. His nickname was El Geniecillo Azul, which is Spanish for "The Little Blue Genius". He has two sons who are also professional wrestlers, Lizmark, Jr. and El Hijo de Lizmark.

== Professional wrestling career ==
Baños grew up in Acapulco, and started a career in hotel management. He was also into bodybuilding, winning the 1971 Mr. Acapulco and 1972 Mr. Guerrero competitions. He was trained to be a boxer by his uncle, and made his professional wrestling debut on March 14, 1976. He chose to wear a mask to hide his wrestling identity from his clients and co-workers at the Hilton Hotel. His ring name of "Lizmark" was inspired by the German battleship Bismarck he had been fascinated with since childhood. Lizmark quickly became one of the innovators in lucha libre, incorporating flashy, high flying moves into the matches, a style that is common today but in the 1970s was new and exciting.

=== Empresa Mexicana de Lucha Libre (1978–1992) ===
After working mainly around Acapulco for a couple of years he was signed to a full-time contract by Empresa Mexicana de Lucha Libre (EMLL) in 1978. On April 18, 1978 Lizmark defeated Américo Rocca to win the Mexican National Welterweight Championship. Over the following year Lizmark defended the title on several occasions, often in the most well received match of the night. His first title reign lasted 346 days, ending on March 29, 1980 when Rocca regained the title, but it was an indicator of things to come for Lizmark. In June 1980 Lizmark won the highest ranking Welterweight title in Mexico, the NWA World Welterweight Championship when he defeated El Supremo for the title. His run with the title lasted 506 days until he was defeated by La Fiera. Lizmark's next title win came at the expense of a wrestler who would become one of Lizmark's most frequent opponents and a man with whom he's had a series of great matches, El Satánico. Lizmark defeated Satánico to win the Mexican National Middleweight Championship on February 10, 1982. In 1983 he lost the title to, and then regained the title from Espectro, Jr. Over the next couple of years Lizmark would win the NWA World Middleweight Championship and the NWA World Light Heavyweight Championship to become only the second man in history to win the NWA title in all three weight divisions promoted by EMLL, the first being Gory Guerrero. Lizmark ended up holding the World Light Heavyweight title four times in total, losing it for the fourth and final time to Satánico on April 5, 1992. Lizmark defeated El Cobarde II to win the WWA World Light Heavyweight Championship in 1988 and held it for an undetermined amount of time.

On July 1, 1991 Lizmark's son made his professional wrestling debut under the name Lizmark, Jr. wearing a modified version of his father's mask and outfit.

=== Asistencia Asesoría y Administración (1992–1995) ===
When EMLL booker Antonio Peña left EMLL to create his own promotion, Asistencia Asesoría y Administración (AAA), in mid-1992 Lizmark was one of the many wrestlers that were loyal to Peña and left to join AAA. In AAA he defeated Universo 2000 to become the first AAA based Mexican National Light Heavyweight Champion after Universo 2000 had brought the title with him when he jumped to AAA. In 1993 Lizmark began a long running feud with one of Antonio Peña's latest creations, La Parka, a Rudo character (villain) who wore a full-body suit that looks like a skeleton. The feud with Lizmark helped elevate La Parka up the ranks and through their matches and La Parka's charisma helped establish him as one of the first stars created in AAA. Their feud was one of the featured matches at the very first Triplemanía where Lizmark defended the Mexican title against La Parka in a match that originally saw La Parka cheat to win the third fall, only to have it overturned by the wrestling commission. The fourth fall between the two went to a draw that allowed Lizmark to retain his championship. Further fuel was added to the storyline between the two when Lizmark defeated La Parka to win the WWA World Light Heavyweight Championship on October 23, 1993. At Triplemanía II-A Lizmark teamed with his son, Lizmark, Jr. and Tinieblas Jr., losing to his old EMLL rival Satánico who teamed up with Espectro and Psicosis for the night. The Lizmark / La Parka feud was one of the driving forces behind an Eight-man "Atómicos" tag team match that saw Lizmark, Perro Aguayo, El Hijo del Santo, and Máscara Sagráda defeat La Parka, Psicosis, Black Cat and Satánico. On June 20, 1994 La Parka regained the WWA Light Heavyweight title from Lizmark when he pinned him on a show in Monterrey, Nuevo León. Three months later La Parka won the Mexican National Light Heavyweight title from Lizmark on September 9, 1994 which marked the end of the storyline between the two.

=== Consejo Mundial de Lucha Libre (1995–2007) ===
In 1995 Lizmark left AAA and returned to EMLL, which by now was best known as Consejo Mundial de Lucha Libre (CMLL), starting off with a series of matches against Satánico, the natural foil to Lizmark. On September 18, 1996 Lizmark teamed up with Atlantis to form a team called La Ola Azul ("The Blue Wave") to defeat Gran Markus, Jr. and El Hijo del Gladiador, known as La Ola Blanca ("The White Wave") to win the CMLL World Tag Team Championship. The team only held the title for 12 days before the title was vacated following an inconclusive match against The Headhunters. On April 29, 1997 Lizmark, Atlantis and Mr. Niebla defeated Rey Bucanero, Emilio Charles, Jr. and Satánico to win the CMLL World Trios Championship. The trio held the championship for 519 days until they were forced to vacate the belts due to Mr. Niebla suffering a serious injury.

In January 1999 Lizmark had chest pains that lead to heart problems, although he denied the heart attack rumors, which kept him out of the ring for a while. He was even told that he'd never wrestle again, but he returned to the ring after six months. It was clear though that he was not able to perform at the same level as previously. Following his heart problems Lizmark maintained a much lighter schedule, wrestling only select dates. In 2001, Lizmark was inducted into the Wrestling Observer Newsletter Hall of Fame. In 2003 Lizmark returned to AAA to participate in Triplemanía XI where he teamed with the new version of his longtime rival La Parka as well as Octagón and Super Caló to defeat Abismo Negro, Cibernético and the Headhunters. He subsequently worked for CMLL between 2004 and 2008.

=== Independent circuit ===
In 2008 Lizmark left CMLL and began working select dates on the Mexican Independent circuit. During this time he introduced a second son, El Hijo de Lizmark to the wrestling world and announced that he was planning on retiring soon.

== Death ==
Baños died due to respiratory failure on December 16, 2015, at the age of 64 just two days before his 65th birthday.

== Championships and accomplishments ==
- All Japan Pro Wrestling
  - January 3 Korakuen Hall Junior Heavyweight Battle Royal (1984)
- Asistencia Asesoría y Administración
  - Mexican National Light Heavyweight Championship (1 time)
- Empresa Mexicana de Lucha Libre / Consejo Mundial de Lucha Libre
  - CMLL World Tag Team Championship (1 time) – with Atlantis
  - CMLL World Trios Championship (1 time) – with Atlantis and Mr. Niebla
  - Mexican National Middleweight Championship (2 times)
  - Mexican National Welterweight Championship (1 time)
  - NWA World Light Heavyweight Championship (4 times)
  - NWA World Middleweight Championship (1 time)
  - NWA World Welterweight Championship (1 time)
  - Homenaje a Dos Leyendas honoree (2016)
- Pro Wrestling Illustrated
  - PWI ranked him #183 of the 500 best singles wrestlers of the PWI 500 in 1995
  - PWI ranked him #175 of the 500 best singles wrestlers during the PWI Years in 2003
- World Wrestling Association
  - WWA World Light Heavyweight Championship (3 times)
- Wrestling Observer Newsletter
  - Wrestling Observer Newsletter Hall of Fame (Class of 2001)

== Luchas de Apuestas record ==
Winner (wager)	Loser (wager)	Location	Event	Date	Notes
Lizmark (mask)	Mario Valenzuela (hair)	Acapulco, Guerrero	Live event	N/A	
Lizmark (mask)	Mario Valenzuela (hair)	Mexico City	Live event	N/A	
Lizmark (mask)	El Invasor (hair)	N/A	Live event	N/A	
Lizmark (mask)	Raúl Armas (hair)	N/A	Live event	N/A	
Lizmark (mask)	Mr. Lancer (hair)	N/A	Live event	N/A	
Lizmark (mask)	Ultraseven (mask)	Japan	Live event	N/A	
Lizmark (mask)	El Insólito (mask)	Culiacán, Sinaloa	Live event	N/A	
Lizmark (mask)	El Tiburón (mask)	N/A	Live event	N/A	
Lizmark (mask)	Américo Rocca (hair)	N/A	Live event	N/A	
Lizmark (mask)	El Cíclope (Note: not Halloween) (mask)	Tijuana, Baja California	Live event	N/A	
Lizmark (mask)	El Faraón (hair)	Acapulco, Guerrero	Live event	N/A	
Lizmark and Centauro (masks)	Mario Valenzuela and El Musulmán (mask)	Acapulco, Guerrero	Live event	March 4, 1979	
Lizmark and Atlantis (mask)	The Animals (I and II) (masks)	Mexico City	Live event	November 25, 1990	
Lizmark (mask)	El Norteamericano (mask)	San Luis Potosí, San Luis Potosí	Live event	June 28, 1998	(Note: This was a triangle match that also included Universo 2000.)
