= Juicio Final (1994) =

Mexican professional wrestling event

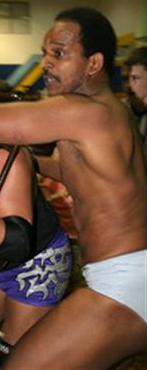
- Black Magic, who had his hair shaved off after his main event loss
- Promotion: Consejo Mundial de Lucha Libre
- Date: December 16, 1994 (aired December 17, 1994)
- City: Mexico City, Mexico
- Venue: Arena México
- Attendance: 7,000

Event chronology
← Previous; Copa de Oro	Next → Gran Alternativa

Juicio Final chronology
← Previous; 1993	Next → 1995

Juicio Final (1994) (Spanish for "Final Judgement" 1994) was a professional wrestling supercard show, scripted and produced by Consejo Mundial de Lucha Libre (CMLL), which took place on December 16, 1994, in Arena México, Mexico City, Mexico. The show served as the year-end finale for CMLL before Arena México, CMLL's main venue, closed down for the winter for renovations and to host Circo Atayde . The shows replaced the regular Super Viernes ("Super Friday") shows held by CMLL since the mid-1930s. This was the sixth year that CMLL used the name "Jucio Final" for their year-end show, a name they would use on a regular basis going forward, originally for their year even events but later on held at other points in the year.

The main event of the show was a Luchas de Apuestas, or bet match, which is considered a higher profile match type than a championship match in Lucha Libre. The match saw La Fiera defeat Black Magic, two falls to one, after which Black Magic was shaved bald. On the undercard Los Cowboys (Silver King and El Texano) defeated Emilio Charles Jr. and El Satánico in the finals of a 16-team tournament for the CMLL World Tag Team Championship. The top four matches were shown on Televisa the following day.

== Production ==
=== Background ===
For decades Arena México, the main venue of the Mexican professional wrestling promotion Consejo Mundial de Lucha Libre (CMLL), would close down in early December and remain closed into either January or February to allow for renovations as well as letting Circo Atayde occupy the space over the holidays. As a result CMLL usually held a "end of the year" supercard show on the first or second Friday of December in lieu of their normal Super Viernes show. 1955 was the first year where CMLL used the name "El Juicio Final" ("The Final Judgement") for their year-end supershow. It is no longer an annually recurring show, but instead held intermittently sometimes several years apart and not always in the same month of the year either. All Juicio Final shows have been held in Arena México in Mexico City, Mexico which is CMLL's main venue, its "home".

=== Storylines ===
The 1994 Juicio Final show featured five professional wrestling matches scripted by CMLL with some wrestlers involved in scripted feuds. The wrestlers portray either heels (referred to as rudos in Mexico, those that play the part of the "bad guys") or faces (técnicos in Mexico, the "good guy" characters) as they perform.

In the summer of 1994, then-CMLL World Tag Team Champion El Canek was planning on leaving CMLL, which meant that CMLL had to make plans for the tag team championship that Canek held at the time alongside Dr. Wagner Jr. The decision was made to hold a 16-team tournament to determine the next champions. The tournament started on July 22, 1994 and ran until August 5. As it turned out El Canek stayed in CMLL longer than expected and was still working for them by the time El Texano and Silver King won the tournament. CMLL named the winning team the "number one contenders", but before they got a chance to wrestle against Canek and Dr. Wagner Jr., Canek left CMLL. Without a championship team to defend against El Texano and Silver King CMLL organized a second 16-team tournament to determine who would wrestle the previous tournament winners for the vacant championship. The second tournament, which ran from November 18 until December 2 featured several wrestlers that also competed in the first tournament, most with different partners. The second tournament was won by El Satánico and Emilio Charles Jr. The two tournament winners would then face off at Juicio Final for the championship.

Number 1 Contenders tournament

Round of 16
El Texano and Silver King	W
Nobutaka Araya and Takashi Okano
Pierroth Jr. and Emilio Charles Jr.
Vampiro Canadiense and Pegasus Kid	W
Gran Markus Jr. and El Hijo del Gladiator	W
Bestia Salvaje and El Felino
Espectro Jr. and Cadaver de Ultratumba
Atlantis and Rayo de Jalisco Jr.	W
Los Headhunters	W
Black Magic and Mano Negra
Super Astro and Hayabusa
Negro Casas and El Dandy	W
Brazo de Oro and Brazo de Plata	W
La Fiera and Apolo Dantés
Ringo Mendoza and Cachorro Mendoza	W
Miguel Perez Jr. and Ricky Santana

Quarterfinals
El Texano and Silver King	W
Vampiro Canadiense and Pegasus Kid
Gran Markus Jr. and El Hijo del Gladiator
Atlantis and Rayo de Jalisco Jr.	W
Los Headhunters	W
Negro Casas and El Dandy
Brazo de Oro and Brazo de Plata
Miguel Perez Jr. and Ricky Santana	W

Semifinals
El Texano and Silver King	W
Atlantis and Rayo de Jalisco Jr.
Los Headhunters
Miguel Perez Jr. and Ricky Santana	W

Finals
El Texano and Silver King	W
Miguel Perez Jr. and Ricky Santana

Number 2 Contenders tournament

Round of 16
Dr. Wagner Jr. and Pierroth Jr.	W
Brazo de Oro and Brazo de Plata
Gran Markus Jr. and El Hijo del Gladiador
Blue Demon Jr. and Dos Caras	W
Negro Casas and El Dandy	W
Jaque Mate and Guerrero de la Muerte
Héctor Garza and Humberto Garza Jr.
Vampiro Canadiense and Apolo Dantés	W
Atlantis and Corazon de Leon	W
Rayo de Jalisco Jr. and Hijo del Solitario
Black Power and Black Magic
La Fiera and Shocker	W
Último Dragón and Hayabusa	W
El Felino and Mano Negra
Sangre Chicana and Bestia Salvaje
El Satánico and Emilio Charles Jr.	W

Quarterfinals
Pierroth Jr. and Dr. Wagner Jr.	W
Blue Demon Jr. and Dos Caras
Negro Casas and El Dandy
Vampiro Canadiense and Apolo Dantés	W
Atlantis and Corazon de Leon	W
La Fiera and Shocker
Último Dragón and Hayabusa
El Satánico and Emilio Charles Jr.	W

Semifinals
Pierroth Jr. and Dr. Wagner Jr.	W
Vampiro Canadiense and Apolo Dantés
Atlantis and Corazon de Leon
El Satánico and Emilio Charles Jr.	W

Finals
Pierroth Jr. and Dr. Wagner Jr.
El Satánico and Emilio Charles Jr.	W

== Results ==
No.	Results	Stipulations
1^{D}	El Felino and Los Guerreros del Futuro (Damián el Guerrero and Guerrero Maya defeated Blue Demon Jr., El Hijo del Solitario, and Máscara Mágica	Best two-out-of-three falls six-man tag team match
2	Bestia Salvaje, El Hijo del Gladiador, and Mano Negra defeated El Dandy, Kato Kung Lee Jr., and Negro Casas	Best two-out-of-three falls six-man tag team match
3	Corazon de Leon, Mil Máscaras, and Vampiro defeated Dr. Wagner Jr., Gran Markus Jr., and Pierroth Jr.	Best two-out-of-three falls six-man tag team match
4	Los Cowboys (Silver King and El Texano) (c) defeated Emilio Charles Jr. and El Satánico	Best two-out-of-three falls tournament finals for the vacant CMLL World Tag Team Championship
5	La Fiera defeated Black Magic	Best two-out-of-three falls, Lucha de Apuestas, hair vs. hair match
(c) / – the champion(s) heading into the match; D / – this was a dark match
