= List of CMLL World Tag Team Champions =

List of professional wrestling tag team champions

The CMLL World Tag Team Championship (Campeonato Mundial de Parejas CMLL in Spanish) is a professional wrestling tag team championship promoted by the Mexican Lucha Libre wrestling-based promotion Consejo Mundial de Lucha Libre (CMLL; Spanish for "World Wrestling Council") since 1993.^{[G]} As it is a professional wrestling championship, it is not won legitimately; it is instead won via a scripted ending to a match or awarded to a wrestler because of a storyline. All title matches take place under two out of three falls rules.^{[G]}

In early 1993, then-CMLL booker Antonio Peña decided to leave the promotion and start his own professional wrestling promotion, Asistencia Asesoría y Administración (AAA); when Peña left CMLL, he acquired a number of wrestlers, among them the then-reigning Mexican National Tag Team Champions, Misterioso and Volador, leaving CMLL without a Tag Team title. In response, CMLL created the CMLL World Tag Team Championship to fill the void. On March 3, 1993, Canek and Dr. Wagner Jr. won a tournament to become the first CMLL World Tag Team Champions.^{[G]} The team of Negro Casas and Shocker hold the record for the longest reign as a team at 1,335. Último Guerrero and Rey Bucanero hold the record for the longest combined reigns of any team: 1,185 days divided over three reigns. Individually, Negro Casas has held the championship six times for a total of 2,577 days, the longest of any champion. The team of Último Guerrero and Dr. Wagner Jr. held the championship for seven days, the shortest reign of any champion. (Note: The reign of Shocker and Mr. Niebla lasted somewhere from 1 day to 293 days; the Último Guerrero/Dr. Wagner Jr. championship reign has been documented by sources as lasting seven days.) Negro Casas and Último Guerrero have the most title reigns with six each, while the combinations of Último Guerrero and Rey Bucanero and Averno and Mephisto are the only teams to have won the championship three times.

== Title history ==
Key
No.	Overall reign number
Reign	Reign number for the specific team—reign numbers for the individuals are in parentheses, if different
Days	Number of days held
N/A	Unknown information
+	Current reign is changing daily

No.	Champion	Championship change			Reign statistics		Notes	Ref.
No.	Champion	Date	Event	Location	Reign	Days	Notes	Ref.
Consejo Mundial de Lucha Libre (CMLL)
1	El Canek and Dr. Wagner Jr.	March 3, 1993	CMLL on Televisa	Mexico City, D.F.	1	(Note: The exact date on which the title was vacated is not known, which means their title reign lasted between 608 and 637 days.)	Defeated Vampiro Canadiense and Pierroth Jr. in the finals of a 16-team tournament.	
—	Vacated	November 2, 1994	—	—	—	—	Championship vacated when El Canek left the promotion.	^{[G]}
2	Los Cowboys (Silver King and El Texano)	December 15, 1994	Juicio Final	Mexico City, D.F.	1	197	Defeated El Satánico and Emilio Charles Jr. in the finals of a 32-team tournament.	^{[G]}
3	Los Headhunters (Headhunter A and Headhunter B)	June 30, 1995	Live event	Mexico City, D.F.	1	126		
4	Atlantis and Rayo de Jalisco Jr.	November 3, 1995	Live event	Mexico City, D.F.	1	277		
5	La Nueva Ola Blanca (Gran Markus Jr. and El Hijo del Gladiador)	August 6, 1996	Live event	Mexico City, D.F.	1	43		
6	Atlantis (2) and Lizmark	September 18, 1996	Live event	Acapulco, Guerrero	1	(Note: The exact date on which the title was vacated is not known, which means their title reign lasted between 105 and 136 days.)		
—	Vacated	January 5, 1997	—	—	—	—	Championship vacated after an inconclusive match against Los Headhunters.	^{[G]}
7	Silver King (2) and Dr. Wagner Jr. (2)	February 2, 1997	Live event	Mexico City, D.F.	1	(Note: The exact date on which the title was vacated is not known, which means their title reign lasted between 180 and 210 days.)	Defeated Último Dragón and Dos Caras in the finals of an eight-team tournament.	
—	Vacated	August 27, 1997	—	—	—	—	Championship vacated after Silver King left CMLL	^{[G]}
8	Emilio Charles Jr. and Dr. Wagner Jr. (3)	August 29, 1997	Live event	Mexico City, D.F.	1	147	Defeated Los Headhunters in the final of an eight-team tournament.	
9	Mr. Niebla and Shocker	January 23, 1998	Live event	Mexico City, D.F.	1	(Note: The exact date on which the title was vacated is not known, which means their title reign lasted between 1 and 293 days.)		
—	Vacated	September 23, 1998	—	—	—	—	Championship vacated when Mr. Niebla was injured.	^{[G]}
10	Bestia Salvaje and Scorpio Jr.	November 13, 1998	Live event	Mexico City, D.F.	1	84	Defeated Dr. Wagner Jr. and El Satánico in the finals of an eight-team tournament.	
11	Negro Casas and El Hijo del Santo	February 5, 1999	Live event	Mexico City, D.F.	1	21	Hijo del Santo and Negro Casas refused to accept the championship after winning by disqualification: a decision match is held.	
12	Bestia Salvaje and Scorpio Jr.	February 26, 1999	Live event	Mexico City, D.F.	2	35	Won the decision match	
13	Negro Casas and El Hijo del Santo	April 2, 1999	live event	Mexico City, D.F.	2	441		
—	Vacated	June 16, 2000	—	—	—	—	Championship vacated when El Hijo del Santo stopped working for CMLL full-time.	
14	Los Guerreros del Infierno (Rey Bucanero and Último Guerrero)	August 4, 2000	Entre Torre Infernal	Mexico City, D.F.	1	455	Defeated Mr. Niebla and Villano IV in the finals of a 16-team tournament.	
15	Negro Casas and El Hijo del Santo	November 2, 2001	Live event	Mexico City, D.F.	3	210		
16	Los Guerreros del Infierno (Rey Bucanero and Último Guerrero)	May 31, 2002	Live event	Mexico City, D.F.	2	602		
17	La Parka and Shocker (2)	January 23, 2004	Live event	Mexico City, D.F.	1	56		
18	Los Guerreros del Infierno (Rey Bucanero and Último Guerrero)	March 19, 2004	Homenaje a Dos Leyendas (2004)	Mexico City, D.F.	3	128		
19	Atlantis (3) and Blue Panther	July 25, 2004	Live event	Mexico City, D.F.	1	251		
20	Averno and Mephisto	April 2, 2005	Live event	Mexico City, D.F.	1	377		
21	Negro Casas (4) and Místico	April 14, 2006	Live event	Mexico City, D.F.	1	455		
22	Último Guerrero (4) and Dr. Wagner Jr. (4)	July 13, 2007	Live event	Mexico City, D.F.	1	7		
23	Negro Casas (5) and Místico (2)	July 20, 2007	Live event	Mexico City, D.F.	2	105		
24	Los Guerreros de la Atlantida (Atlantis (4) and Último Guerrero (5))	November 2, 2007	Live event	Mexico City, D.F.	1	91		
25	Averno and Mephisto	February 1, 2008	Live event	Mexico City, D.F.	2	38	Won a 16-team tournament to earn the title match.	
26	Héctor Garza and Místico (3)	March 10, 2008	Live event	Puebla, Puebla	1	39		
—	Vacated	April 18, 2008	—	—	—	—	The title was held up after a match against Averno and Mephisto ended in a double-disqualification.	
27	Héctor Garza (2) and Místico (4)	May 23, 2008	Live event	Mexico City, D.F.	2	198	Defeated Averno and Mephisto in a rematch.	
28	Los Hijos del Averno (Averno and Mephisto)	December 7, 2008	Live event	Mexico City, D.F.	3	40		
29	Super Sky Team (La Sombra and Volador Jr.)	January 16, 2009	CMLL Super Viernes	Mexico City, D.F.	1	542		
30	Los Invasores (Mr. Águila and Héctor Garza (3))	July 16, 2010	Super Viernes	Mexico City, D.F.	1	109		
31	Los Guerreros de la Atlantida (Dragón Rojo Jr. and Último Guerrero (6))	November 2, 2010	Live event	Mexico City, D.F.	1	640		
32	Atlantis (5) and Diamante Azul	August 3, 2012	Super Viernes	Mexico City, D.F.	1	102		
33	Bullet Club Latinoamerica (El Terrible and Tama Tonga)	November 13, 2012	CMLL Domingo	Mexico City, D.F.	1	234		
34	Hiroshi Tanahashi and Jushin Thunder Liger	July 5, 2013	Kizuna Road 2013	Tokyo, Japan	1	71		
35	Bullet Club Latinoamerica (Rey Bucanero (4) and Tama Tonga (2))	September 14, 2013	Road to Destruction	Tokyo, Japan	1	34		
36	Los Ingobernables (La Máscara and Rush)	October 18, 2013	CMLL Super Viernes	Mexico City, D.F.	1	238	Were awarded the title, when Bucanero was unable to defend the title due to an injury. Had earned the title match by winning a 16-team tournament.	
37	Negro Casas (6) and Shocker (3)	June 13, 2014	CMLL Super Viernes	Mexico City, D.F.	1	1,335		
—	Vacated	February 7, 2018	—	—	—	—	Championship vacated when decision of the company, since Casas and Shocker could not defend their titles from 2016 to date.	
38	Valiente and Volador Jr. (2)	March 16, 2018	Homenaje a Dos Leyendas (2018)	Mexico City, D.F.	1	119	Defeated Rey Bucanero and El Terrible in a tournament final to crown new champions	
39	Los Ingobernables (Rush (2) and El Terrible (2))	July 13, 2018	Atlantis 35th Anniversary show	Mexico City, D.F.	1	128		
40	Diamante Azul (2) and Valiente (2)	November 18, 2018	Domingo Arena Mexico	Mexico City, D.F.	1	194		
41	Los Guerreros Laguneros (Euforia and Gran Guerrero)	May 31, 2019	Juicio Final	Mexico City, D.F.	1	154		
42	Alianza de Plata y Oro (Carístico (5) and Místico)	November 1, 2019	Día de Muertos	Mexico City, D.F.	1	662	Carístico's first four reigns were under the name Místico. The second Místico took over the name in 2012.	
—	Vacated	August 24, 2021	—	—	—	—	Championship vacated when Místico (II) left CMLL	
43	Titán and Volador Jr. (3)	September 24, 2021	Aniversario 88	Mexico City, D.F.	1	121	Defeated Gemelo Diablo I and Gemelo Diablo II for the vacant titles	
44	Los Nuevos Ingobernables (Ángel de Oro and Niebla Roja)	January 23, 2022	CMLL Domingos Arena Mexico	Mexico City, D.F.	1	1,733+	This was a two out of three falls match.	

== Combined reigns ==
As of October 22, 2026.

†	Indicates the current champion
¤	The exact length of at least one title reign is uncertain, so the shortest possible length is used.

=== By team ===
Rank	Team	No. of reigns	Combined days
1	Los Nuevos Ingobernables † (Ángel de Oro and Niebla Roja)	1	1,733+
2	Negro Casas and Shocker	1	1,335
3	Los Guerreros del Infierno (Rey Bucanero and Último Guerrero)	3	1,155
4	Alianza de Plata y Oro (Carístico and Místico)	1	663
5	Los Guerreros de la Atlantida (Dragón Rojo Jr. and Último Guerrero)	1	640
6	Místico and Negro Casas	2	560
7	Super Sky Team (La Sombra and Volador Jr.)	1	546
8	Los Hijos del Averno (Averno and Mephisto)	3	456
9	Atlantis and Blue Panther	1	280
10	Atlantis and Rayo de Jalisco Jr.	1	277
11	Los Ingobernables (La Máscara and Rush)	1	238
12	Héctor Garza and Místico	2	237
13	Bullet Club Latinoamerica (El Terrible and Tama Tonga)	1	234
14	El Hijo del Santo and Negro Casas	3	¤210
15	Los Cowboys (Silver King and El Texano)	1	196
16	Diamante Azul and Valiente	1	194
17	Los Guerreros Laguneros (Euforia and Gran Guerrero)	1	154
18	Dr. Wagner Jr. and Emilio Charles Jr.	1	147
19	Los Ingobernables (Rush and El Terrible)	1	128
20	The Headhunters (Headhunter A and Headhunter B)	1	126
21	Titán and Volador Jr.	1	121
22	Bestia Salvaje and Scorpio Jr.	2	119
22	El Sky Team (Valiente and Volador Jr.)	1	119
24	Los Invasores (Mr. Águila and Héctor Garza)	1	109
25	Atlantis and Diamante Azul	1	102
26	Los Guerreros de la Atlantida (Atlantis and Último Guerrero)	1	91
27	Hiroshi Tanahashi and Jushin Thunder Liger	1	71
28	La Parka and Shocker	1	56
29	La Nueva Ola Blanca (Gran Markus Jr. and El Hijo del Gladiador)	1	43
30	Atlantis and Lizmark	1	37
31	Bullet Club Latinoamerica (Rey Bucanero and Tama Tonga)	1	34
32	Último Guerrero and Dr. Wagner Jr.	1	7
34	El Canek and Dr. Wagner Jr.	1	
33	Mr. Niebla and Shocker	1	
35	Silver King and Dr. Wagner Jr.	1	

=== By individuals ===
Rank	Team	No. of reigns	Combined days
1	Negro Casas	6	¤2,105
2	Último Guerrero	6	1,893
3	Angel de Oro †	1	1,733+
3	Niebla Roja †	1	1,733+
5	Carístico/Místico	5	1,460
6	Shocker	3	¤1,391
7	Rey Bucanero	4	1,189
8	Atlantis	5	¤787
9	Volador Jr.	3	786
10	Místico (II)	1	663
11	Dragón Rojo Jr.	1	640
12	La Sombra	1	546
13	Averno	3	456
13	Mephisto	3	456
15	Rush	2	366
16	El Terrible	2	362
17	Héctor Garza	3	346
18	Valiente	2	313
19	Diamante Azul	2	296
20	Blue Panther	1	280
21	Rayo de Jalisco Jr.	1	277
22	Tama Tonga	2	268
23	La Máscara	1	238
24	El Hijo del Santo	3	¤210
25	El Texano	1	196
25	Silver King	2	¤196
27	Dr. Wagner Jr.	4	¤154
27	Euforia	1	154
27	Gran Guerrero	1	154
30	Emilio Charles Jr.	1	147
31	Headhunter A	1	126
31	Headhunter B	1	126
33	Titán	1	121
34	Bestia Salvaje	2	119
34	Scorpio Jr.	2	119
36	Mr. Águila	1	109
37	Hiroshi Tanahashi	1	71
37	Jushin Thunder Liger	1	71
39	La Parka	1	56
40	El Hijo del Gladiador	1	43
40	Gran Markus Jr.	1	43
42	Lizmark	1	37
43	Mr. Niebla	1	¤1
44	El Canek	1	¤1
