= Juicio Final (1995) =

Mexican professional wrestling event

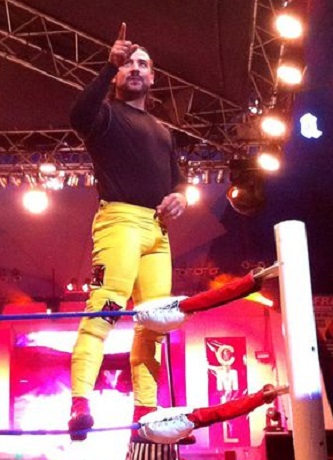
- Héctor Garza, who won the hair of Bestia Salvaje and El Satánico over the course of the two Juicio Final shows
- Promotion: Consejo Mundial de Lucha Libre
- Date: December 1, 1995; December 15, 1995; (aired December 2, 1995 December 16, 1995)
- City: Mexico City, Mexico
- Venue: Arena México
- Attendance: 6,000 (December 15)

Event chronology
← Previous; Copa de Oro	Next → La Copa Junior

Juicio Final chronology
← Previous; 1994	Next → 1996

Juicio Final (1995) (Spanish for "Final Judgement" 1995) was the name used for two major professional wrestling shows, scripted and produced by Consejo Mundial de Lucha Libre (CMLL). The shows took place on December 1 and December 15, 1995 in Arena México, Mexico City, Mexico. The shows served as the year-end finale for CMLL before Arena México, CMLL's main venue, closed down for the winter for renovations and to host Circo Atayde . The shows replaced the regular Super Viernes ("Super Friday") shows held by CMLL since the mid-1930s. This was the seventh year that CMLL used the name "Jucio Final" for their year-end show, a name they would use on a regular basis going forward, originally for their year even events but later on held at other points in the year.

The December 1 main event was originally scheduled to be a Luchas de Apuestas, or bet match, where both Shocker and Kahoz were supposed to put their mask on the line. Shocker came down with strep throat prior to the show and the scheduled match had to be replaced with a three way Lucha de Apuestas match between Bestia Salvaje, El Satánico and Héctor Garza. In the replacement main event Garza ended up defeating Bestia Salvaje, forcing Bestia Salvaje to have all his hair shaved off. The December 1 show included three additional matches, including Negro Casas defeating El Hijo del Santo to win the vacant NWA World Welterweight Championship.

The original mask vs. mask match ended up taking place on December 15 instead, with Shocker defeating Kahoz, forcing Kahoz to unmask and reveal his real name, Alberto Leonel Hernández López, as per lucha libre traditions. The main event of the December 15 show saw Héctor Garza defeat El Satánico forcing Satánico to have his hair shaved off. The show included a total of six matches, including Apolo Dantés successfully defending the CMLL World Heavyweight Championship against Vampiro.

== Production ==
=== Background ===
For decades Arena México, the main venue of the Mexican professional wrestling promotion Consejo Mundial de Lucha Libre (CMLL), would close down in early December and remain closed into either January or February to allow for renovations as well as letting Circo Atayde occupy the space over the holidays. As a result CMLL usually held a "end of the year" supercard show on the first or second Friday of December in lieu of their normal Super Viernes show. 1955 was the first year where CMLL used the name "El Juicio Final" ("The Final Judgement") for their year-end supershow. It is no longer an annually recurring show, but instead held intermittently sometimes several years apart and not always in the same month of the year either. All Juicio Final shows have been held in Arena México in Mexico City, Mexico which is CMLL's main venue, its "home".

=== Storylines ===
The 1995 Juicio Final shows featured twelve professional wrestling matches scripted by CMLL with some wrestlers involved in scripted feuds. The wrestlers portray either heels (referred to as rudos in Mexico, those that play the part of the "bad guys") or faces (técnicos in Mexico, the "good guy" characters) as they perform.

In October 1995, CMLL programmed young técnicos Shocker against the experienced veteran Kahoz as part of an ongoing storyline to elevate Shocker up the ranks of CMLL. The two found themselves on opposite sides of several matches during late 1995, often with Kahoz unmasking his young rival, or cheating to win. CMLL announced a Lucha de Apuestas, or mask vs. mask match, between the two for the main event of the 1995 Juicio Final show.

Mexican professional wrestling promotion Promociones Mexicana de Lucha Libre (PROMELL) had control of the Mexican National Tag Team Championship in late 1995, with the champions Fuerza Guerrera and Juventud Guerrera agreeing to work for CMLL, bringing the championship with them. CMLL promoted the first match of the December 1 match as a Mexican National Tag Team Championship match with the Guerreras defending against El Dandy and La Fiera. The father/son team had a falling out prior to the Juicio Final show, opting to return to work for AAA instead.

In mid-1995, then-reigning NWA World Welterweight Champion Misterioso left AAA to work for rival promotion AAA. CMLL announced the championship vacant on June 19, 1995 as a result of Misterioso's defection. The promotion held a 16-man single elimination tournament to determine the next champion, holding the first two parts of the tournament on November 17 and 24, with the final match set for the 1995 Juicio Final show.

==== NWA World Welterweight Championship tournament brackets ====
Round of 16
Oro II	W
Rey Bucanero Jr.
El Felino	W
Onita Jr.
Arkangel de la Muerte	W
Atlantico
El Hijo del Santo	W
Astro Rey Jr.
El Pantera	W
Olímpico
Karloff Lagarde Jr.	W
Tajiri
Ángel Azteca	W
Máscara Mágica
Negro Casas	W
Guerrero Maya

Quarterfinals
Oro II
El Felino	W
Arkangel de la Muerte
El Hijo del Santo	W
El Pantera	W
Karloff Lagarde Jr.
Ángel Azteca
Negro Casas	W

Semifinals
El Felino
El Hijo del Santo	W
El Pantera
Negro Casas	W

Finals
El Hijo del Santo
Negro Casas

== Event ==
On the day of the December 1 Juicio Final, Shocker was declared medically unfit to wrestle due to a severe case of strep throat, forcing CMLL to instead hold a three way Lucha de Apuestas match between El Satánico, Héctor Garza and Bestia Salvaje, a match originally scheduled for December 15, instead. The change to the main event was not announced until after the show had started.

For the opening match Fuerza Guerrera was teamed up with PROMELL co-founder Blue Panther for the match, a match that up until that day had been promoted a being for the Mexican National Tag Team Championship, but come match time the championship belts were not seen nor referred to by any officials. Panther and Guerrera defeated El Dandy and La Fiera. The third match of the night was the final match of a tournament for the vacant NWA World Welterweight Championship, in which Negro Casas defeated long time tag team partner, turned rival, El Hijo del Santo to become the 34th overall champion.

The main attraction of the show was El Satánico, Héctor Garza and Bestia Salvaje all risking their hair on the outcome of the match. CMLL had booked a mini tournament consisting of several singles matches, allowing the first wrestler to win two matches to not actually have to risk his hair in the final match. El Satánico defeated Bestia Salvaje and then Héctor Garza in back-to-back matches, followed by Garza winning the third and final match. As a result of his loss Bestia Salvaje was forced to have his hair shaved off, although he only had part of it shaved off, leading to loud disapproval from the crowd.

The second Juicio Final show, on December 15, reportedly drew 6,000 spectators for their 6 match show, with the last three matches being shown on Televisa the following day. In the fourth match of the night Shocker was finally able to face off against his veteran rival, defeating Kahoz in two falls to win the match. After the match Kahoz was forced to remove his mask and tell the audience his real name, Alberto Leonel Hernández López, as he stood in the middle of the ring. After unmasking it was confirmed that it was the same wrestler who had previously been known as "Astro Rey".

In the semi-main event Apolo Dantés successfully defended the CMLL World Heavyweight Championship against Vampiro, winning the first and the third fall of the match. For the main event, the two wrestlers who survived the main event of the December 1 Juicio Final, Héctor Garza and El Satánico faced off under Lucha de Apuestas rules. Garza won the second and third fall of the match, in what was called a "star making performance", with El Satánico being shaved completely bald after the match as per the match stipulations.

== Results December 1, 1995 ==
No.	Results	Stipulations
1^{D}	Blue Panther and Fuerza Guerrera defeated El Dandy and La Fiera	Tag team match
2^{D}	Apolo Dantés, Black Panther and MS-1 defeated Dos Caras, El Fantasma and Rayo de Jalisco Jr.	Best two-out-of-three falls six-man tag team match
3^{D}	Negro Casas defeated El Hijo del Santo	Singles match for the vacant NWA World Welterweight Championship
4	El Satánico defeated Bestia Salvaje	Three-way Lucha de Apuesta elimination match
5	El Satánico defeated Héctor Garza	Three-way Lucha de Apuesta elimination match
6	Héctor Garza defeated Bestia Salvaje	Best two-out-of-three falls Lucha de Apuestas, hair vs. hair match
D / – this was a dark match

== Results December 15, 1995 ==
No.	Results	Stipulations
1^{D}	Arkángel de la Muerte and Guerrero de la Muerte defeated Águila Solitaria and Ciclón Ramírez	Tag team match
2^{D}	Dr. Wagner Jr., Emilio Charles Jr., El Felino, and Negro Casas defeated El Dandy, Pantera, and Los Cowboys (Silver King and El Texano)	Eight-man, submission elimination rules
3^{D}	Atlantis, La Fiera, and Rayo de Jalisco Jr. defeated Dr. Wagner Jr., Máscara Año 2000, and Universo 2000	Best two-out-of-three falls six-man tag team match
4	Shocker defeated Kahoz	Best two-out-of-three falls, Lucha de Apuestas, mask vs. mask match
5	Apolo Dantés (c) defeated Vampiro	Best two-out-of-three falls match for the CMLL World Heavyweight Championship
6	Héctor Garza defeated El Satánico	Best two-out-of-three falls, Lucha de Apuestas, hair vs. hair match
(c) / – the champion(s) heading into the match; D / – this was a dark match
