= Juicio Final (1993) =

Mexican professional wrestling event

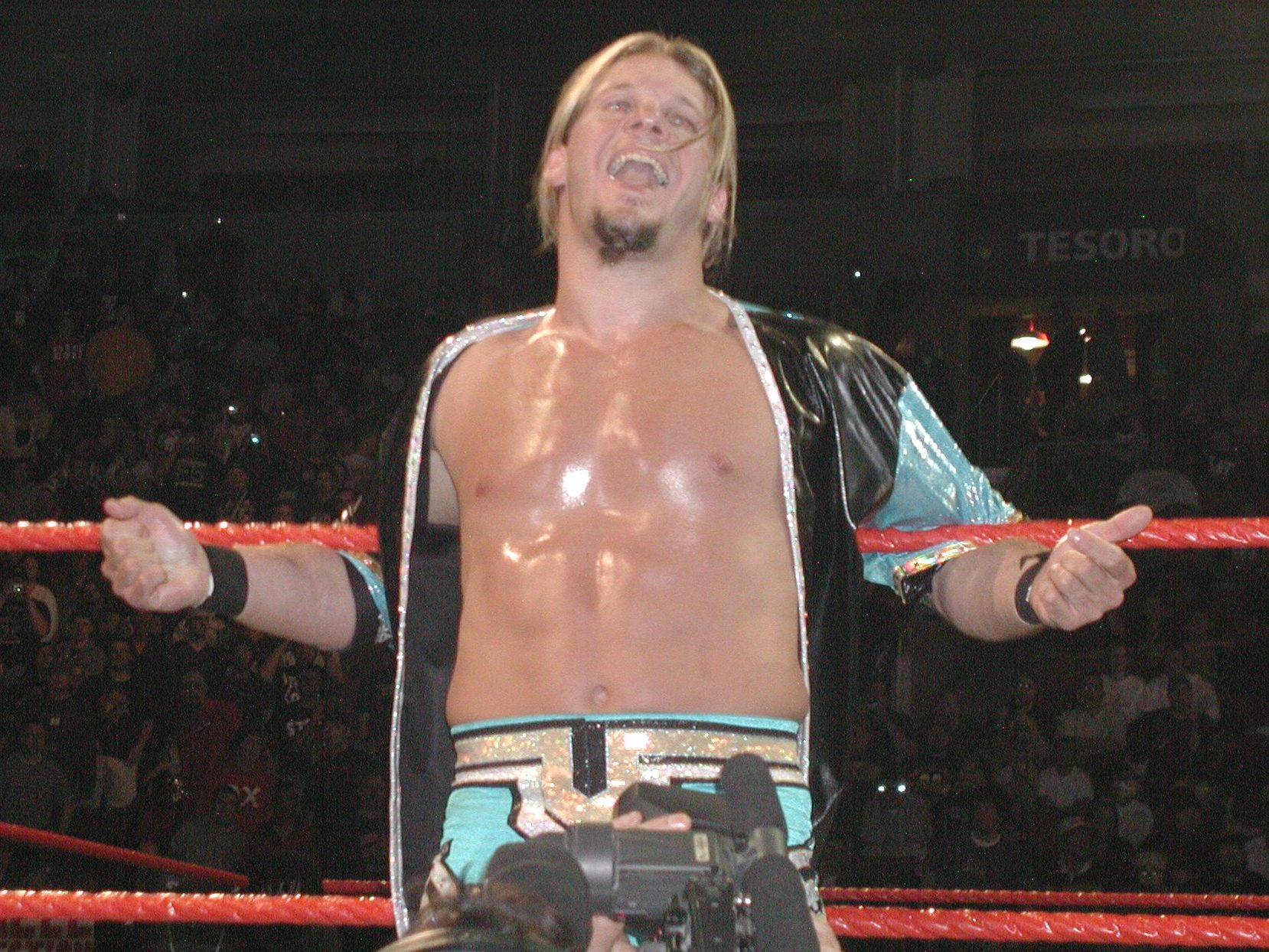
- Chris Jericho, who worked under the name "Corazon de Leon" ("Lion heart") on the December 3 Juicio Final
- Promotion: Consejo Mundial de Lucha Libre
- Date: December 3, 1993; December 10, 1993; (aired: December 4, 1993; December 11, 1993)
- City: Mexico City, Mexico
- Venue: Arena México

Event chronology
← Previous; CMLL 60th Anniversary Show	Next →: 38. Aniversario de Arena México

Juicio Final chronology
← Previous; 1992	Next → 1994

Juicio Final (1993) (Spanish for "Final Judgement" 1993) were a pair of professional wrestling supercard shows, scripted and produced by Consejo Mundial de Lucha Libre (CMLL). The two shows took place on December 3 and December 10, 1993, in Arena México, Mexico City, Mexico. The shows served as the year-end finale for CMLL before Arena México, CMLL's main venue, closed down for the winter for renovations and to host Circo Atayde . The shows replaced the regular Super Viernes ("Super Friday") shows held by CMLL since the mid-1930s.

The main event of the December 3 show was a Luchas de Apuestas, or bet match, which is considered a higher profile match type than a championship match in Lucha Libre. The match saw Mano Negra defeated Bestia Salvaje, two falls to one, to win the match. Afterwards Bestia Salvaje was forced to stand in the middle of the ring as his hair was shaved off in accordance with lucha libre traditions. That show featured four additional matches

For the December 10 show, Kato Kung Lee and Mocho Cota both risked their hair in another Lucha de Apuestas, hair vs. hair match, that saw Cota cheat to defeat Kato Kung Lee. As a result Lee was shaved bald afterwards. On the undercard Último Dragón successfully defended the UWA World Middleweight Championship against El Felino. The December 10 show featured three additional matches.

== Production ==
=== Background ===
For decades Arena México, the main venue of the Mexican professional wrestling promotion Consejo Mundial de Lucha Libre (CMLL), would close down in early December and remain closed into either January or February to allow for renovations as well as letting Circo Atayde occupy the space over the holidays. As a result CMLL usually held an "end of the year" supercard show on the first or second Friday of December in lieu of their normal Super Viernes show. 1989 is the first year where CMLL used the name "El Juicio Final" ("The Final Judgement") for their year end supershow.
December 8, 1989 It is no longer an annually recurring show, but instead held intermittently sometimes several years apart and not always in the same month of the year either. All Juicio Final shows have been held in Arena México in Mexico City, Mexico which is CMLL's main venue, its "home".

=== Storylines ===
The 1993 Juicio Final shows featured ten professional wrestling matches in total, all scripted by CMLL with some wrestlers involved in scripted feuds. The wrestlers portray either heels (referred to as rudos in Mexico, those that play the part of the "bad guys") or faces (técnicos in Mexico, the "good guy" characters) as they perform.

== Results December 3, 1993 ==
No.	Results	Stipulations
1^{D}	Filoso and Metálico defeated Escudero Rojo and Reyes Veloz	Best two-out-of-three falls tag team match
2	Espectro Jr., Halcon Negro Jr., and Tornado Negro defeated Americo Rocca, Blue Demon Jr. and La Sombra	Best two-out-of-three falls six-man tag team match
3^{D}	El Felino, Jaque Mate, and Mocho Cota defeated El Dandy, Kato Kung Lee and Último Dragón	Best two-out-of-three falls six-man tag team match
4^{D}	Dr. Wagner Jr., John Tenta, and Pierroth Jr. defeated Corazon de Leon, Rayo de Jalisco Jr. and King Haku	Best two-out-of-three falls six-man tag team match
5	Mano Negra defeated Bestia Salvaje	Best two-out-of-three falls Lucha de Apuestas, hair vs. hair match
D / – this was a dark match

== Results December 10, 1993 ==
No.	Results	Stipulations
1^{D}	El Hijo del Solitario, El Pantera and La Sombra defeated Los Guerreros del Futuro (Damian El Guerrero, Guerrero del Futuro and Guerrero Maya)	Best two-out-of-three falls six-man tag team match
2^{D}	La Ola Blanca (Dr. Wagner Jr., Gran Markus Jr., and El Hijo del Gladiador) defeated Los Brazos (Brazo de Oro, Brazo de Plata and El Brazo)	Best two-out-of-three falls six-man tag team match
3^{D}	Atlantis, Rayo de Jalisco Jr. and King Haku vs. Mano Negro, Negro Casas and Pierroth Jr. ended in a double disqualification	Best two-out-of-three falls six-man tag team match
4^{D}	Último Dragón (c) defeated El Felino	Best two-out-of-three falls match for the UWA World Middleweight Championship
5	Mocho Cota defeated Kato Kung Lee	Best two-out-of-three falls Lucha de Apuestas, hair vs. hair match
(c) / – the champion(s) heading into the match; D / – this was a dark match
