= Entre Torre Infernal =

Mexican professional wrestling supercard show

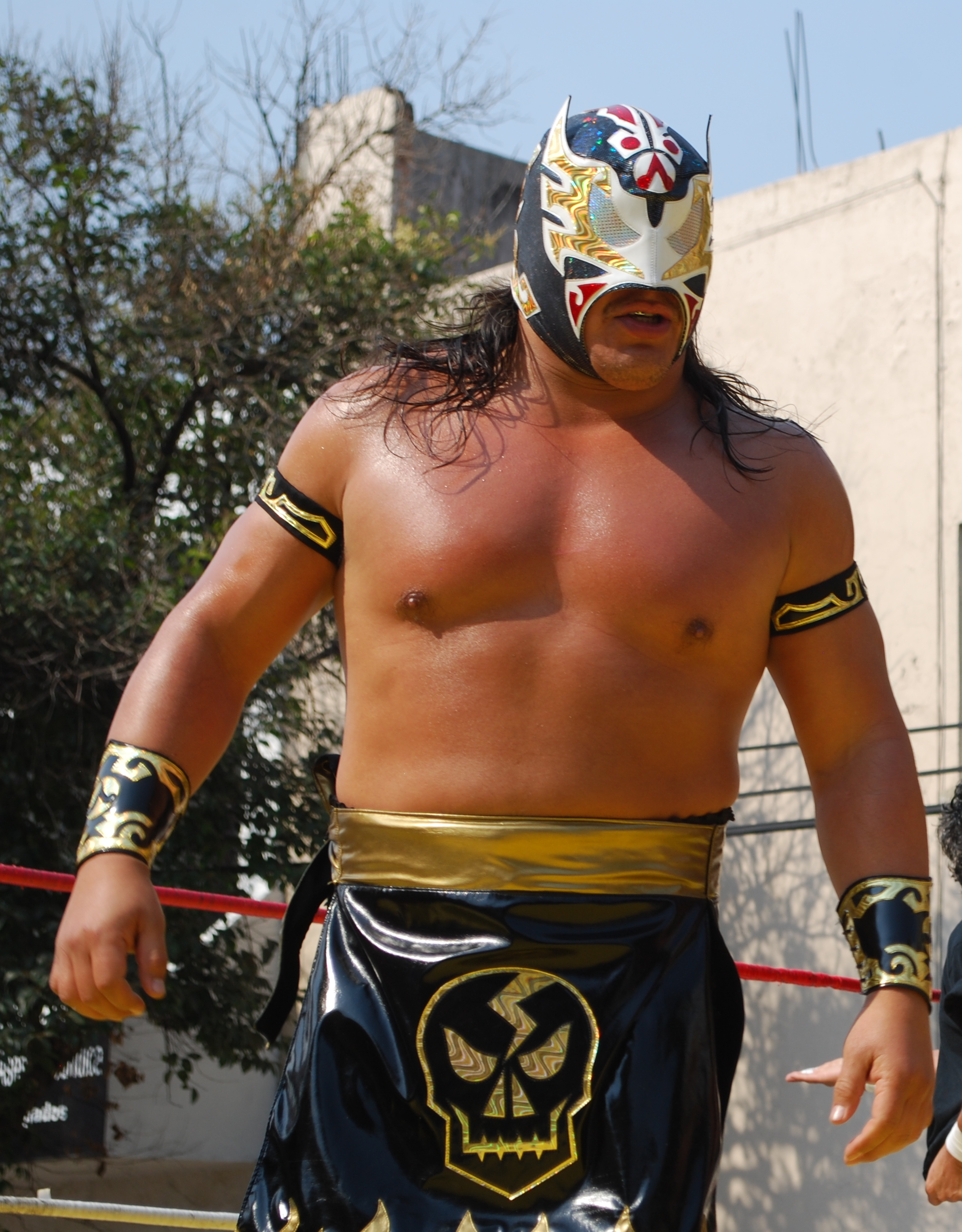
- Último Guerrero, awarded and defended the CMLL World Tag Team Championship along with Rey Bucanero.
- Promotion: Consejo Mundial de Lucha Libre
- Date: August 4, 2000
- City: Mexico City, Mexico
- Venue: Arena México
- Attendance: 17,803

Pay-per-view chronology
← Previous; Juicio Final	Next → Leyenda de Plata

Entre Torre Infernal (Spanish for "In the Infernal Tower") was a professional wrestling Pay-Per-View (PPV) event produced by Consejo Mundial de Lucha Libre (CMLL) that took place on August 4, 2000, in Arena México, Mexico City, Mexico.

The main event of the PPV was a 4-man Steel Cage elimination match, contested under Lucha de Apuestas rules where each competitor puts his hair on the line. The rules state that a wrestler can leave the cage either by climbing over the top of the cage or by pinning an opponent; the last man in the cage would have his hair shaved off. The four wrestlers in the cage were Villaño III, Perro Aguayo, Pierroth Jr. and Máscara Año 2000. CMLL has subsequently branded the "multi-man Apuesta cage match" as Infierno en el Ring ("Inferno in the ring") instead of the Torre Infernal ("Infernal Tower") name they used for this PPV event. The undercard featured a 10-man Torneo Cibernetico where the last two wrestlers would face off in a "Mask vs. Mask" match. The event was also supposed to host the finals of a tournament for the vacant CMLL World Tag Team Championship but due to an injury to Emilio Charles Jr. Rey Bucanero and Último Guerrero won the championship by forfeit and instead had their first title defense, facing the team of Mr. Niebla (Charles Jr.'s partner) and Villaño IV. The show also featured two Six-man "Lucha Libre rules" tag team match, one for normal sized wrestlers and one for wrestlers from the Mini-Estrella, or minis, division.

== Background ==
The event featured seven professional wrestling matches with different wrestlers involved in pre-existing scripted feuds or storylines. Wrestlers portray either villains (referred to as Rudos in Mexico) or fan favorites (Técnicos in Mexico) as they compete in wrestling matches with pre-determined outcomes.

== Results ==
No.	Results	Stipulations	Times
1	Ultimo Dragoncito, Bracito de Oro and Cicloncito Ramirez defeated Fire, El Fierito and Pierrothito – won by countout	Best two-out-of-three falls six-man "Lucha Libre rules" tag team match	13:18
2	Lizmark Jr., Brazo de Plata and Negro Casas defeated Dr. Wagner Jr., Bestia Salvaje and El Satánico: First fall: Dr. Wagner Jr., Bestia Salvaje and Satánico won (1-0); Second fall: Lizmark Jr., Brazo de Plata and Negro Casas won (1-1); Third fall: Dr. Wagner Jr. was disqualified (2-1)	Best two-out-of-three falls six-man "Lucha Libre rules" tag team match	15:20
3	Los Guerreros del Infierno (Rey Bucanero and Último Guerrero) defeated Mr. Niebla and Emilio Charles Jr. by forfeit as Charles Jr. was unable to compete. Bucanero and Guerrero were awarded the vacant title.	Tag team match for the vacant CMLL World Tag Team Championship	00:00
4	Los Guerreros del Infierno (Rey Bucanero and Último Guerrero) defeated Mr. Niebla and Villaño IV: First fall: Mr. Niebla submitted (1-0); Second fall: Villaño IV forced Último Guerrero to submit (1-1); Third fall: Último Guerrero pinned Mr. Niebla (2-1)	Best two-out-of-three falls Tag team match for the CMLL World Tag Team Championship	21:07
5	Blue Panther, Black Warrior, Máscara Mágica, Rencor Latino, El Hijo del Gladiador and Olímpico defeated Safari, El Solar, Violencia, Dr. O'Borman Jr., Astro Rey Jr. and Pantera	12-man battle royal to determine the teams, first six wrestlers eliminated form one team	—
6	Blue Panther, Black Warrior, Máscara Mágica, Rencor Latino, El Hijo del Gladiador and Olímpico vs. Safari, El Solar, Violencia, Dr. O'Borman Jr., Astro Rey Jr. and Pantera: Rencor Latino and El Hijo del Gladiador won	12-man Torneo Cibernetico elimination match	—
7	Rencor Latino defeated El Hijo del Gladiador	Best two-out-of-three falls Lucha de Apuestas, mask vs. mask match. After the match El Hijo del Gladiador was forced to unmask	—
8	Máscara Año 2000 lost to Villaño III, Perro Aguayo and Pierroth Jr.	4-man Steel Cage elimination Lucha de Apuestas, hair vs. hair match.	27:13

Torneo Cibernetico order of elimination

#	Pinned	Pinned by	Time
1	Rencor Latino	Dr. O'Borman Jr.	
2	Astro Rey Jr.	Olímpico	
3	Blue Panther	Safari	
4	El Solar	Black Warrior (By count out)	
5	Máscara Mágica	Violencia	
6	Rencor Latino	Pantera	
7	El Hijo del Gladiador	El Solar	
8	Máscara Mágica	Astro Rey Jr.	
9	Rencor Latino and Hijo del Gladiador	Máscara Mágica (by DQ)	
10	Survivors	Rencor Latino and El Hijo del Gladiador	
