= WWA World Lightweight Championship =

Professional wrestling championship

WWA World Lightweight Championship (Campeonato Mundial de peso Ligero WWA)

Details
- Promotion: Universal Wrestling Association (UWA)
- Date established: 1987
- Date retired: 1995
Statistics
- First champion(s): Mano Negra
- Most reigns: Rey Misterio, Jr. (3 reigns)

The WWA World Lightweight Championship (Campeonato Mundial de peso Ligero WWA in Spanish) is an inactive professional wrestling championship promoted by the Mexican wrestling promotion World Wrestling Association (WWA) from 1987 until 1995. The official definition of the Welterweight weight class in Mexico is between 63 kg (139 lb) and 70 kg (150 lb), but the weight limits are not always strictly adhered to. (Note: The most recent case of this is Mephisto, who holds the CMLL World Welterweight Championship, a belt with a 78 kg (172 lb) upper limit despite weighing 90 kg (200 lb).) It was first won by Mano Negra in 1987 and defended throughout Mexico until 1995 when the title was first declared vacant and then later on inactive.

As it was a professional wrestling championship, the championship was not won not by actual competition, but by a scripted ending to a match determined by the bookers and match makers. (Note: Hornbaker (2016) p. 550: "Professional wrestling is a sport in which match finishes are predetermined. Thus, win–loss records are not indicative of a wrestler's genuine success based on their legitimate abilities – but on now much, or how little they were pushed by promoters") On occasion the promotion declares a championship vacant, which means there is no champion at that point in time. This can either be due to a storyline, (Note: Duncan & Will (2000) p. 271, Chapter: Texas: NWA American Tag Team Title [World Class, Adkisson] "Championship held up and rematch ordered because of the interference of manager Gary Hart") or real life issues such as a champion suffering an injury being unable to defend the championship, (Note: Duncan & Will (2000) p. 20, Chapter: (United States: 19th Century & widely defended titles – NWA, WWF, AWA, IW, ECW, NWA) NWA/WCW TV Title "Rhodes stripped on 85/10/19 for not defending the belt after having his leg broken by Ric Flair and Ole & Arn Anderson") or leaving the company. (Note: Duncan & Will (2000) p. 201, Chapter: (Memphis, Nashville) Memphis: USWA Tag Team Title "Vacant on 93/01/18 when Spike leaves the USWA.")

== Title history ==
Key
No.	Overall reign number
Reign	Reign number for the specific champion
Days	Number of days held
N/A	Unknown information
†	Championship change is unrecognized by the promotion
+	Current reign is changing daily

No.	Champion	Championship change			Reign statistics		Notes	Ref.
No.	Champion	Date	Event	Location	Reign	Days	Notes	Ref.
1	Mano Negra	1987	Live event	(Note: The location of the title change has not been captured as part of the documentation.)	1			(Note: Duncan & Will (2000) p. 400, Chapter: "Mexico: WWA Lightweight Title")
Championship history is unrecorded from 1987 to July 1990.
2	El Hijo del Black Shadow	July 1990	Live event	N/A	1	(Note: The exact date on which el Hijo del Black Shadow won the title is unknown, placing his reign between 151 and 181 days.)		
3	Askari El Gringo	December 29, 1990	Live event	Tuxtla Gutierrez, Mexico	1	(Note: The exact date on which Askari El Gringo lost the title is unknown, placing the title reign between 307 and 336 days.)		
4	El Hijo del Black Shadow	November 1991	Live event	N/A	2	(Note: The exact date on which el Hijo del Black Shadow won the title is unknown, placing the title reign between 251 and 280 days.)		
5	Espanto Jr.	August 7, 1992	Live event	Querétaro, Mexico	1			
Championship history is unrecorded from August 7, 1992 to 1993.
6	Rey Misterio Jr.	(Note: Records do not indicate when Rey Misterio Jr. won the championship, just that he did.)	Live event	N/A	1			
7	Juventud Guerrera	October 1993	Live event	Monterrey, Mexico	1	(Note: The exact date on which Juventud Guerrera won the title is unknown, placing his title reign between 395 and 425 days.)		
8	Rey Misterio Jr.	November 30, 1994	Live event	Matamoros, Mexico	2	92		
9	Juventud Guerrera	March 2, 1995	Live event	Xalapa, Mexico	2	106	Guerrera won the title during a tag team match.	
10	Rey Misterio Jr.	June 16, 1995	Live event	Queretearo, Mexico	3	(Note: The exact date on which Rey Misterio Jr. was stripped of the title is unknown, placing the title reign between 1 and 198 days.)		
—	Deactivated	1995	—	—	—	—	Championship vacated and later inactivated	
