= CMLL World Tag Team Championship =

Professional wrestling tag team championship

- One of the belts representing the championship

Details
- Promotion: Consejo Mundial de Lucha Libre
- Date established: March 3, 1993 (Note: Duncan & Will (2000) p. 396, "Canek & Dr. Wagner Jr. 1993/03/26 Mexico City. Defeated Canadian Vampire Casanova & Pierroth Jr. in best-of-3 series.")
- Current champions: Los Nuevos Ingobernables (Ángel de Oro and Niebla Roja)
- Date won: January 23, 2022
Statistics
- First champions: Dr. Wagner Jr. and El Canek
- Most reigns: Team: Averno/Mephisto, Rey Bucanero/Último Guerrero, Negro Casas/El Hijo del Santo (3 times); Individual: Negro Casas and Último Guerrero (6 times)
- Longest reign: Negro Casas and Shocker (3 years, 239 days)
- Shortest reign: Dr. Wagner Jr. and Último Guerrero (7 days)
- Oldest champion: Negro Casas (54 years, 163 days)
- Youngest champion: La Sombra (19 years, 74 days )
- Heaviest champion: Los Headhunters (Headhunter A and B) (147 kg (324 lb))
- Lightest champion: Averno and Negro Casas (79 kg (174 lb))

The CMLL World Tag Team Championship (CMLL Campeonato Mundial de Parejas in Spanish) is a professional wrestling World Tag Team Championship promoted by Consejo Mundial de Lucha Libre (CMLL; Spanish for "World Wrestling Council") in Mexico and is for two-man tag teams only. The championship was created in 1993 to replace the Mexican National Tag Team Championship and is still promoted by CMLL to this day. It is the top championship promoted by CMLL, with the CMLL Arena Coliseo Tag Team Championship and the Occidente Tag Team Championship considered lower ranked, regional tag team championships. As it is a professional wrestling championship, it is won or lost via wrestling matches.

The reigning champions are Los Nuevos Ingobernables ("The New Ungovernables"; Ángel de Oro and Niebla Roja), having defeated Titán and Volador Jr., on January 23, 2022, at CMLL Domingos Arena Mexico. They are the 44th overall champions in their first reign together. Negro Casas and Shocker hold the record for the longest reign as a team, at 1,335 days. Último Guerrero and Rey Bucanero hold the record for the longest combined reigns of any team: 1,185 days divided over three reigns. Individually, Último Guerrero has held the championship six times for a total of 1,923 days, the longest of any individual. The team of Último Guerrero and Dr. Wagner Jr. held the championship for seven days, the shortest reign of any championship team. Casas and Último Guerrero have the most title reigns with six each, while the combinations of Casas and El Hijo del Santo, Último Guerrero and Rey Bucanero and Averno and Mephisto are the only teams to have won the championship three times.

The championship has been declared vacant on a number of occasions, either because of an injury to one of the champions or because a wrestler stopped working for CMLL for a period of time. The championship has been held up once, based on the inconclusive outcome of a match, being vacant for a week until the two teams had a rematch. CMLL has also held a couple of tournaments designed to give the winners of the tournament a match against the champions, declaring them the official number one contender for the champions.

== History ==
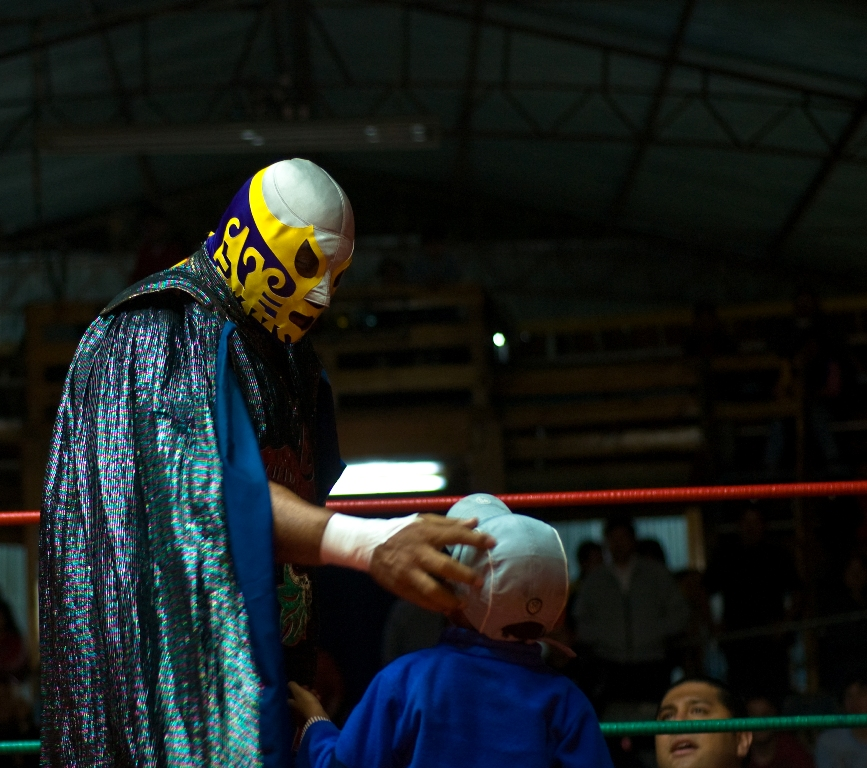
Canek, half of the first championship team.

Starting in 1957 the Mexican Lucha libre, or professional wrestling, promotion Empresa Mexicana de Lucha Libre ("Mexican Wrestling Enterprise"; EMLL) began promoting the Mexican National Tag Team Championship as the top championship of their tag team division. (Note: Duncan & Will (2000) pp. 396-397, chapter "Mexico: National Tag Team Titles) In 1991 EMLL was rebranded Consejo Mundial de Lucha Libre ("World Wrestling Council"; CMLL) after the promotion left the National Wrestling Alliance in the late 1980s. (Note: Madigan (2007) p. 32: "in the late 1980s EMLL withdrew from the National Wrestling Alliance") In 1992 then-CMLL executive Antonio Peña left CMLL along with a number of the promotion's wrestlers to form Asistencia Asesoría y Administración (AAA). Among the wrestlers that left CMLL were then-reigning Mexican National Tag Team Champions Misterioso and Volador. The Mexican National Tag Team Championship was not owned by CMLL but rather by the Mexico City Boxing and Wrestling Commission and the commission allowed AAA to take control of the championship. In early 1993 CMLL decided to create their own tag team championship to replace the Mexican National Tag Team Championship and introduced the CMLL World Tag Team Championship. The team of Canek and Dr. Wagner Jr. faced off against Vampiro Canadiense and Pierroth Jr. in the finals of a 16-team tournament to determine the first champions, with Canek and Wagner Jr. winning the match to become the first tag team champions. The duo would hold the title until El Canek left CMLL in November 1994. CMLL held a 32-team tournament from November 11 to December 16, 1994. In the finals "Los Cowboys" (Silver King and El Texano) defeated El Satánico and Emilio Charles Jr. to become the second ever CMLL World Tag Team Champions. (Note: Duncan & Will (2000) p. 396, "Silver King & El Texano 1994/12/16 Mexico City. Defeat El Satanico & Emilio Charles Jr.") Six months later Los Cowboys would lose the title to their longtime rivals los Headhunters. (Note: Duncan & Will (2000) p. 396, "Head Hunters 1995/06/30 Mexico City")

In September 1996 the champions, the team of Atlantis and Lizmark, were stripped of the championship after an inconclusive match against Los Headhunters. (Note: Duncan & Will (2000) p. 396, "Head Hunters defeat Atlantis & Lizmark on 96/10/25 in Mexico City but are disqualified for continuing to beat on them after the match; Hunters stripped of the titles for stealing the belts and never coming back") In the subsequent eight-team tournament brothers Silver King and Dr. Wagner Jr. captured the title with a victory over Dos Caras and Último Dragón. (Note: Duncan & Will (2000) p. 396, "Dr Wagner Jr. & Silver King 1996/09/18 Defeat Dos Caras & Ultimo Dragon in tournament final") The title would be vacated once again only six months later as Silver King left CMLL to work for World Championship Wrestling (WCW). (Note: Duncan & Will (2000) p. 396, "vacant in 97/08 when King leaves the promotion for WCW") Dr. Wagner Jr. teamed up with Emilio Charles Jr. and the two former champions won an eight-team tournament in August 1997. (Note: Duncan & Will (2000) p. 396, "Dr. Wagner Jr. & Emilio Charles Jr. 1997/08/29 Mexico City, defeat Atlantis & Brazo de Plata in a tournament final") The title would be vacated once again in 1998 when one half of the tag team champions, Mr. Niebla, was injured. Bestia Salvaje and Emilio Charles Jr. became champions by winning an 8-team tournament and began working a storyline with the team of Negro Casas and El Hijo del Santo, whom they traded the title back and forth with over the next year. (Note: Duncan & Will (2000) p. 396, "Negro Casas & El Hijo del Santo 1999/02/05 Mexico City - Bestia Salvaje & Scorpio Jr. [2] 1999/02/26 Mexico City - Negro Casas & El Hijo del Santo [2] 1999/04/02 Mexico City") In early 1999 El Hijo del Santo left CMLL forcing them to vacate the title once again. (Note: Duncan & Will (2000) p. 396, "Vacant in 00/06 when El Hijo del Santo left CMLL") Los Guerreros del Infierno ("The Warriors from the Inferno"; Último Guerrero and Rey Bucanero) defeated Mr. Niebla and Villano IV in a tournament final bringing some stability to the title as they have not been vacated since then. Guerrero and Bucanero have held the title three times since then and Guerrero has teamed with Dr. Wagner Jr. and Atlantis to win the championship twice more. CMLL held a number one contender's tournament in both 2008 and in 2013, using the tournament to build the credibility of the tournament winners. Both the 2008 winners, Averno and Mephisto, and the 2013 winners, Rush and La Máscara would go on to win the championship. (Note: Consejo Mundial de Lucha Libre (October 19, 2013): "por lo que siguiendo los cánones, los Campeones fueron desconocidos, por lo que La Máscara y Rush automáticamente fueron decretados los nuevos monarcas." ("so following the rules the championship was vacated, automatically making La Máscara and Rush the new champions"))

In 2000 CMLL revived the CMLL Arena Coliseo Tag Team Championship after it had been dormant since the 1980s. The title became a secondary tag team championship for CMLL, primarily for younger, lower ranked wrestlers. The Guadalajara branch of CMLL has intermittently promoted the Occidente (western) tag team championship, a local championship that is not defended outside the Mexican state of Jalisco. (Note: Fuego en el Ring (February 28, 2015): "Emocionante combate por los Campeonatos de parejas de Occidente en el que los hasta entonces campeones Boby Zavala y Olímpico expusieron sus cetros ante los retadores Esfinge y El Gallo con El Gallito" ("Exciting match for the Occidente Tag Team Championships in which the until-then-champions Boby Zavala and Olímpico lost the title to challengers Esfinge and El Gallo with El Gallito."))

== Reigns ==
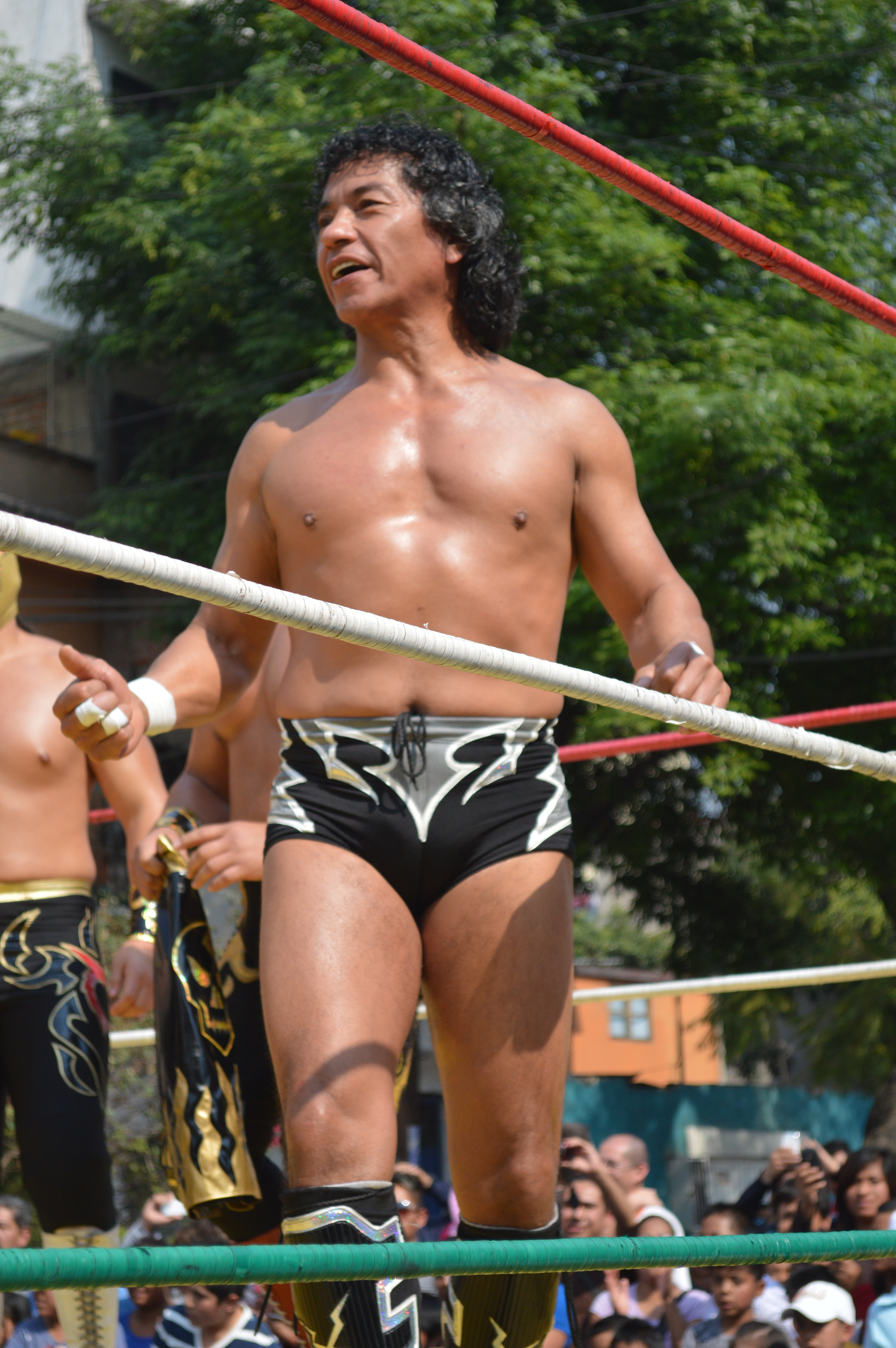
Negro Casas, six time tag team champion.

The current champions are Los Nuevos Ingobernables (Ángel de Oro and Niebla Roja). The team won the championship on January 23, 2022, by defeating Titán and Volador Jr. at CMLL Domingos Arena Mexico. Ángel de Oro and Niebla Roja are the 44th overall champions in their first reign. Negro Casas and Último Guerrero share the record for individual reigns with six, and three teams are tied for most title reigns as a team with Guerrero and Rey Bucanero, Averno and Mephisto and Negro Casas and Hijo del Santo, who all have three reigns. Los Guerreros de la Atlantida (Dragón Rojo Jr. and Último Guerrero) held the title for 640 days, which is the longest reign of any team while Último Guerrero's six reigns combine to 1,923 days. Último Guerrero and Dr. Wagner Jr. held the title for seven days and are thus the team with the shortest reign to date. CMLL has been forced to declare the championship vacant on eight different occasions since its creation in 1993, which meant that there were no champions for a period of time. The title has been declared vacant twice because one of the champions (El Canek and Silver King respectively) left CMLL, and four times due to a major injury to one of the champions. On one occasion CMLL held up the championship, vacating the championship until a rematch between the teams of Místico/Héctor Garza and Averno/Mephisto, a match that Místico and Héctor Garza won to become two-times champions. On February 5, 1999, El Hijo del Santo and Negro Casas defeated Bestia Salvaje and Scorpio Jr. by disqualification, which in CMLL meant that they also won the championship. Casas and Hijo del Santo refused to win the championship in that matter, vacating the championship until the two teams could have a rematch. (Note: Duncan & Will (2000) p. 396, "Wins by DQ, immediately vacate the title when they want to win it cleanly but not by DQ") Casas and Hijo del Santo won the rematch without controversy to win the championship once more. (Note: Duncan & Will (2000) p. 396, "El Hijo del Santo & Negro Casas [2] 1999/02/26 Mexico City")

As the CMLL World Tag Team Championship is a professional wrestling championship. Up until late 2021, all championship matches promoted in Mexico took place under best two-out-of-three falls rules. (Note: Comisión de Box y Lucha Libre p. 44 "Articulo 258 - Cada combate de lucha libre tendrá como limite tres caídas; cada caída será sin limite de tiempo, ganará quien obtenga dos caídas de las tres en disputa" ("Article 258 - Each wrestling match shall have as limit three falls; Each fall will be without time limit. The winner will be the one to first obtain two of the three falls in the match")) On occasion single fall title matches took place, especially when promoting CMLL title matches in Japan, conforming to the traditions of the local promotion. An example of this was when Bushi won the CMLL World Welterweight Championship in a one-fall match on a New Japan Pro-Wrestling show in 2015. (Note: NJPW (December 19, 2015): "試合途中で乱闘を繰り広げ、そのままバックステージに消えた。" ("Meanwhile, BUSHI used his poisonous mist on Dorada, and won the championship with the MX. He stole the belt in one fall"))

== Tournaments ==
=== 1993 ===
The CMLL World Tag Team Championship was the last of the CMLL branded championships to be created in the years immediately following the name change to Consejo Mundial de Lucha Libre. Until early 1993 the Mexican National Tag Team Championship had served as the main tag team title, but the title moved to AAA when the champions left CMLL to jump to AAA leaving CMLL without a tag team championship. (Note: Duncan & Will (2000) p. 396, "Misterioso and Volador left for AAA") CMLL co-promoted the tournament with the Universal Wrestling Association (UWA), holding the tournament spread out over several CMLL and UWA shows, the tournament started on February 26, 1993, featuring wrestlers from both promotions. The finals were spread out over three shows, with one fall of the match on each of the shows. The finals started place on March 19 on a CMLL show, followed by a second match on March 21 at a UWA show, and the third and final match on March 26 on CMLL's Super Viernes show. The tournament was won by Dr. Wagner Jr. a CMLL regular, and El Canek who had been synonymous with the UWA for over a decade at that point in time.

Tournament bracket

Round of 16
Vampiro and Pierroth Jr.	W
Pirata Morgan and El Satánico
Jaque Mate and Massakre	W
Kahoz and Gran Markus Jr.
Los Headhunters	W
Sangre Chicana and Emilio Charles Jr.
Scorpio Sr. and Scorpio Jr.
Máscara Mágica II and Oro	W
Mano Negra and Bestia Salvaje
Apolo Dantés and Rayo de Jalisco Jr.	W
Black Magic and Negro Casas	W
Gran Hamada and King Lee
Atlantis and El Dandy	W
El Texano Jr. and Silver King
Brazo de Oro and Brazo de Plata
Dr. Wagner Jr. and El Canek	W

Quarterfinals
Vampiro and Pierroth Jr.	W
Jaque Mate and Massakre
Los Headhunters	W
Máscara Mágica II and Oro
Apolo Dantés and Rayo de Jalisco Jr.	W
Black Magic and Negro Casas
Atlantis and El Dandy
Dr. Wagner Jr. and El Canek	W

Semifinals
Vampiro and Pierroth Jr.	W
Los Headhunters
Apolo Dantés and Rayo de Jalisco Jr.
Dr. Wagner Jr. and El Canek	W

Finals
Vampiro and Pierroth Jr.
Dr. Wagner Jr. and El Canek	W

=== 1994 ===
In the summer of 1994 El Canek was planning on leaving CMLL, which meant that CMLL had to make plans for the tag team championship that Canek held at the time alongside Dr. Wagner Jr. The decision was made to hold a 16-team tournament to determine the next champions. The tournament started on July 22, 1994, and ran until August 5. As it turned out El Canek stayed in CMLL longer than expected and was still working for them by the time El Texano and Silver King won the tournament. CMLL named the winning team the "number one contenders", but before they got a chance to wrestle against Canek and Dr. Wagner Jr., Canek left CMLL. Without a championship team to defend against El Texano and Silver King CMLL organized a second 16-team tournament to determine who would wrestle the previous tournament winners for the vacant championship. The second tournament, which ran from November 18 until December 2 featured several wrestlers that also competed in the first tournament, most with different partners. The second tournament was won by El Satánico and Emilio Charles Jr., who ended up losing to El Texano and Silver King on December 16, 1994. With their victory El Texano and Silver King became the second CMLL Tag Team Champions.

Number 1 Contenders tournament

Round of 16
El Texano and Silver King	W
Nobutaka Araya and Takashi Okano
Pierroth Jr. and Emilio Charles Jr.
Vampiro Canadiense and Pegasus Kid	W
Gran Markus Jr. and El Hijo del Gladiator	W
Bestia Salvaje and El Felino
Espectro Jr. and Cadaver de Ultratumba
Atlantis and Rayo de Jalisco Jr.	W
Los Headhunters	W
Black Magic and Mano Negra
Super Astro and Hayabusa
Negro Casas and El Dandy	W
Brazo de Oro and Brazo de Plata	W
La Fiera and Apolo Dantés
Ringo Mendoza and Cachorro Mendoza	W
Miguel Perez Jr. and Ricky Santana

Quarterfinals
El Texano and Silver King	W
Vampiro Canadiense and Pegasus Kid
Gran Markus Jr. and El Hijo del Gladiator
Atlantis and Rayo de Jalisco Jr.	W
Los Headhunters	W
Negro Casas and El Dandy
Brazo de Oro and Brazo de Plata
Miguel Perez Jr. and Ricky Santana	W

Semifinals
El Texano and Silver King	W
Atlantis and Rayo de Jalisco Jr.
Los Headhunters
Miguel Perez Jr. and Ricky Santana	W

Finals
El Texano and Silver King	W
Miguel Perez Jr. and Ricky Santana

Number 2 Contenders tournament

Round of 16
Dr. Wagner Jr. and Pierroth Jr.	W
Brazo de Oro and Brazo de Plata
Gran Markus Jr. and El Hijo del Gladiador
Blue Demon Jr. and Dos Caras	W
Negro Casas and El Dandy	W
Jaque Mate and Guerrero de la Muerte
Héctor Garza and Humberto Garza Jr.
Vampiro Canadiense and Apolo Dantés	W
Atlantis and Corazon de Leon	W
Rayo de Jalisco Jr. and Hijo del Solitario
Black Power and Black Magic
La Fiera and Shocker	W
Último Dragón and Hayabusa	W
El Felino and Mano Negra
Sangre Chicana and Bestia Salvaje
El Satánico and Emilio Charles Jr.	W

Quarterfinals
Pierroth Jr. and Dr. Wagner Jr.	W
Blue Demon Jr. and Dos Caras
Negro Casas and El Dandy
Vampiro Canadiense and Apolo Dantés	W
Atlantis and Corazon de Leon	W
La Fiera and Shocker
Último Dragón and Hayabusa
El Satánico and Emilio Charles Jr.	W

Semifinals
Pierroth Jr. and Dr. Wagner Jr.	W
Vampiro Canadiense and Apolo Dantés
Atlantis and Corazon de Leon
El Satánico and Emilio Charles Jr.	W

Finals
Pierroth Jr. and Dr. Wagner Jr.
El Satánico and Emilio Charles Jr.	W

=== February 1997 ===
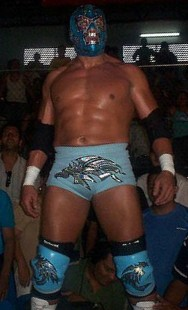
Dr. Wagner Jr., who won the tournament with his brother Silver King.

On October 25, 1996 Los Headhunters defeated then reigning CMLL World Tag Team Champions Atlantis and Lizmark to win the titles. After the match was over Los Headhunters continued to attack both of their opponents, which led to the referee disqualifying the team, negating the championship change. Los Headhunters took the championship belts with them, ignoring that they were not actually the champions. The storyline was that the team declared themselves the tag team champions, but CMLL did not have the same opinion, declaring the titles vacant instead. CMLL followed up the decision to vacate the championship by holding an eight-team tournament that spanned their February 21 and February 28, 1997 Super Viernes shows. In the end, the brother team of Dr. Wagner Jr. and Silver King defeated Dos Caras and Último Dragón to become the seventh overall champions.

Tournament bracket

Quarterfinals
Negro Casas and Black Magic	W
Brazo de Oro and Brazo de Plata
Dr. Wagner Jr. and Silver King	W
El Dandy and Lizmark
Dos Caras and Último Dragón	W
Emilio Charles Jr. and Bestia Salvaje
Los Headhunters	W
Atlantis and Rayo de Jalisco Jr.

Semifinals
Negro Casas and El Dandy
Dr. Wagner Jr. and Silver King	W
Dos Caras and Último Dragón	W
Los Headhunters

Finals
Dr. Wagner Jr. and Silver King	W
Dos Caras and Último Dragón

=== August 1997 ===
The team of Silver King and Dr. Wagner Jr. had held the championship since winning a tournament on February 2, 1997, but in August, 1997 Silver King left CMLL to work for Promo Azteca and the U.S. based World Championship Wrestling (WCW). CMLL held a two-night, eight-team tournament to fill the void left by Silver King leaving. The finals took place on August 29, where Dr. Wagner Jr. and his new partner Emilio Charles Jr. defeated Los Headhunters to become the eight overall champions. (Note: Duncan & Will (2000) p. 396, "Dr. Wagner Jr. & Emilio Charles Jr. 1997/08/29 Mexico City - defeats the Head Hunters in a tournament final")

Tournament brackets

Quarterfinals
Gran Markus Jr. and Steel	W
Brazo de Oro and Brazo de Plata
Los Headhunters	W
Máscara Año 2000 and Universo 2000
Emilio Charles Jr. and Dr. Wagner Jr.	W
Atlantis and Mr. Niebla
Cien Caras and Apolo Dantés	W
Lizmark and Rayo de Jalisco Jr.

Semifinals
Gran Markus Jr. and Steel
Los Headhunters	W
Emilio Charles Jr. and Dr. Wagner Jr.	W
Cien Caras and Apolo Dantés

Finals
Los Headhunters
Emilio Charles Jr. and Dr. Wagner Jr.	W

=== 1998 ===
In the fall of 1998 Mr. Niebla suffered an injury while holding the CMLL World Tag Team Championship with Shocker. Due to the injury Mr. Niebla was unable to compete so CMLL declared the championship vacant and put together an eight-team tournament to crown new champions. The tournament started on October 30 and lasted until November 13 where the team of Bestia Salvaje and Scorpio Jr. defeated El Satánico and Dr. Wagner Jr. to become the tenth over all tag team champions. (Note: Duncan & Will (2000) p. 396, "Bestia Salvaje and Scorpio Jr. 1998/11/13 Defeat Dr. Wagner Jr & El Satantico in tournament final")

Tournament brackets

Quarterfinals
Bestia Salvaje and Scorpio Jr.	W
Los Headhunters
Atlantis and Lizmark	W
Fuerza Guerrera and Villano III
Black Warrior and Blue Panther
El Hijo del Santo and Shocker	W
Felino and La Fiera
El Satánico and Dr. Wagner Jr.	W

Semifinals
Bestia Salvaje and Scorpio Jr.	W
Atlantis and Lizmark
El Hijo del Santo and Shocker
El Satánico and Dr. Wagner Jr.	W

Finals
Bestia Salvaje and Scorpio Jr.	W
El Satánico and Dr. Wagner Jr.

=== 2000 ===
On June 16, 2000, the CMLL World Tag Team Championship was announced as vacant. The official explanation was that co-champion Negro Casas voluntarily gave up the championship to "give other teams a chance", but in reality his partner, El Hijo del Santo, had stopped working for CMLL. CMLL organized a 16-team tournament from June 23 through August 4, 2000, with the finals being at CMLL's Entre Torre Infernal pay-per-view. The finals of the tournament was set to be Los Infernales ("The Infernal Ones"; Rey Bucanero and Último Guerrero) against the team of Emilio Charles Jr. and Mr. Niebla but Emilio Charles Jr. had suffered an injury before the show began. As a result, Los Infernales were declared the new champions. The team was then ordered to defend the championship against Mr. Niebla and his new partner Villano IV so there was still a championship match on the show. Los Infernales retained the championship. They later successfully defended against Mr. Niebla and Emilio Charles Jr. on August 18, 2000.

Tournament brackets

Round of 16
Fuerza Guerrera and Black Warrior
Emilio Charles Jr. and Mr. Niebla	W
Scorpio Jr. and Zumbido	W
Tony Rivera and Antifaz del Norte
Dr. Wagner Jr. and Shocker	W
Atlantis and Rayo de Jalisco Jr.
Ringo Mendoza and Tinieblas Jr.	W
Apolo Dantés and El Satánico
Villano IV and Villano V	W
Gran Markus Jr. and Pimpinela Escarlata
El Felino and Tarzan Boy
Rey Bucanero and Último Guerrero	W
Lizmark and Lizmark Jr.	W
Cien Caras and Universo 2000
Olímpico and Brazo de Plata
Bestia Salvaje and Blue Panther	W

Quarterfinals
Emilio Charles Jr. and Mr. Niebla	W
Scorpio Jr. and Zumbido
Dr. Wagner Jr. and Shocker	W
Tinieblas Jr. and Ringo Mendoza
Villano IV and Villano V
Rey Bucanero and Último Guerrero	W
Lizmark and Lizmark Jr.	W
Bestia Salvaje and Blue Panther

Semifinals
Emilio Charles Jr. and Mr. Niebla	W
Dr. Wagner Jr. and Shocker
Rey Bucanero and Último Guerrero	W
Lizmark and Lizmark Jr.

Finals
Emilio Charles Jr. and Mr. Niebla
Rey Bucanero and Último Guerrero	W

=== Number one contenders tournament 2008 ===
In January 2008 CMLL put together a 16-team tournament to determine which team would get a title match against then-champions Atlantis and Último Guerrero. The tournament took place over three weeks, with two qualifying blocks and then the final match in the third week. The finals saw former CMLL World Tag Team Champions Los Hijos del Averno ("The Sons of Hell"; Averno and Mephisto) defeating the team of Dos Caras Jr. and La Sombra. On February 1, 2008, Averno and Mephisto defeated Atlantis and Último Guerrero to become the 25th overall champions.

Tournament brackets

Round of 16
Villano IV and Villano V	W
Rey Bucanero and Stuka Jr.
Blue Panther and Sagrado	W
Ohara and Okumura
Dos Caras Jr. and La Sombra	W
Héctor Garza and Pierroth Jr.
Perro Aguayo Jr. and El Texano Jr.	W
La Máscara and Volador Jr.
El Felino and Heavy Metal	W
Misterioso Jr. and Sangre Azteca
Flash and Último Dragón
Averno and Mephisto	W
Super Nova and Valiente
Damián 666 and Mr. Águila	W
Black Warrior and Olímpico	W
Marco Corleone and Alex Koslov

Quarterfinals
Villano IV and Villano V	W
Blue Panther and Sagrado
Dos Caras Jr. and La Sombra	W
Perro Aguayo Jr. and El Texano Jr.
El Felino and Heavy Metal
Averno and Mephisto	W
Damián 666 and Mr. Águila
Black Warrior and Olímpico	W

Semifinals
Villano IV and Villano V
Dos Caras Jr. and La Sombra	W
Averno and Mephisto	W
Black Warrior and Olímpico

Finals
Dos Caras Jr. and La Sombra
Averno and Mephisto	W

=== Number one contenders tournament 2013 ===
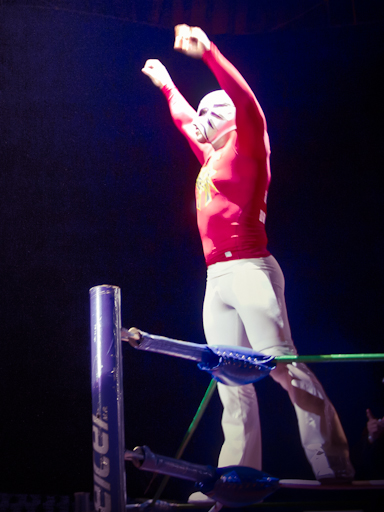
La Máscara, who teamed up with Rush to win the tournament.

In September, 2013 CMLL arranged a 16-team tournament to determine which duo would be next in line to get a match for the CMLL World Tag Team Championship. In the end, the team of La Máscara and Rush defeated the team of Atlantis and La Sombra. (Note: MedioTiempo (October 9, 2013): "Atlantis y La Sombra conformaron la dupla que los enfrentó, no obstante, se toparon con dos rivales en plan arrollador, quienes dieron un paso muy importante hacia los títulos, al llevarse la batalla luego de aplicar el Martillo Negro y La Campana a los protagonistas del LXXX Aniversario." ("Atlantis and La Sombra formed the team that faced them, however, the two rivals faced a unified team, who took a very important step towards the championship, winning the match after applying the Black Hammer and La Campana to the protagonists of the 80th Anniversary.")) The duo would be awarded the championship on September 18, 2013, when champions Rey Bucanero and Tama Tonga were unable to defend the title due to Bucanero being injured. Months later La Máscara, Rush and La Sombra formed Los Ingobernables during La Máscara and Rush's tag team title reign. (Note: Consejo Mundial de Lucha Libre (May 5, 2014): "Rush Y La Sobra, Los mas odiados" ("Rush and La Sombra, the most hated"))

Tournament brackets

Round of 16
Gran Guerrero and Último Guerrero	W
Delta and Guerrero Maya Jr.
Diamante Azul and Marco Corleone	W
El Terrible and Vangelis
Místico II and Valiente
Psicosis and Volador Jr.	W
Misterioso Jr. and Ephesto
Atlantis and La Sombra	W
Morphosis and Kraneo	W
Thunder and Tritón
La Máscara and Rush	W
Dragón Rojo Jr. and Rey Escorpión
Brazo de Plata and Máximo
El Felino and Mr. Niebla	W
Máscara Dorada and Titán
Averno and Mephisto	W

Quarterfinals
Gran Guerrero and Último Guerrero	W
Diamante Azul and Marco Corleone
Psicosis and Volador Jr.
Atlantis and La Sombra	W
Morphosis and Kraneo
La Máscara and Rush	W
El Felino and Mr. Niebla	W
Averno and Mephisto

Semifinals
Gran Guerrero and Último Guerrero
Atlantis and La Sombra	W
La Máscara and Rush	W
El Felino and Mr. Niebla

Finals
Atlantis and La Sombra
La Máscara and Rush	W

=== 2018 ===
On February 7, 2018, CMLL announced that they had stripped then-champions Negro Casas and Shocker of the championship due to a lack of championship defenses. The team had not defended the championship since October 11, 2016, a total of 485 days without a championship match. CMLL held a 16 team tournament starting on Friday March 2 and is slated to end on March 16 at CMLL's annual Homenaje a Dos Leyendas show.

Round of 16
Dragon Lee and Místico	W
Forastero and Sansón
Valiente and Volador Jr.	W
Euforia and Kraneo
Pierroth and Rush	W
Hechicero and Máscara Año 2000
Gran Guerrero and Último Guerrero	W
Atlantis and Soberano Jr.
Titán and Tritón
Mephisto and Ephesto	W
Diamante Azul and Stuka Jr.	W
Blue Panther and Blue Panther Jr.
Rey Bucanero and El Terrible	W
Okumura and Sam Adonis
Marco Corleone and Niebla Roja	W
Bárbaro Cavernario and Mr. Niebla

Quarterfinals
Dragon Lee and Místico
Valiente and Volador Jr.	W
Pierroth and Rush
Gran Guerrero and Último Guerrero	W
Mephisto and Ephesto
Diamante Azul and Stuka Jr.	W
Rey Bucanero and El Terrible	W
Marco Corleone and Niebla Roja

Semifinals
Valiente and Volador Jr.	W
Gran Guerrero and Último Guerrero
Diamante Azul and Stuka Jr.
Rey Bucanero and El Terrible	W

Finals
Valiente and Volador Jr.	W
Rey Bucanero and El Terrible
