= Bestia Salvaje =

Mexican professional wrestler

Personal information
- Born: Juan Manuel Rodriguez Carillo; February 11, 1962 Guadalajara, Jalisco, Mexico
- Died: March 20, 2008 (aged 46) Mexico City, Mexico
- Parent: Espectro II (father)
- Family: Corazón Salvaje (brother); Charrito de Oro (brother-in-law)

Professional wrestling career
- Ring names: Freddy Rodriguez; Bestia Salvaje
- Billed height: 1.72 m (5 ft 8 in)
- Billed weight: 90 kg (198 lb)
- Trained by: Diablo Velasco; Alfredo Carrillo
- Debut: June 12, 1983

Juan Manuel Rodriguez Carillo (February 11, 1962 – March 20, 2008) was a Mexican professional wrestler, best known by his ring name Bestia Salvaje. He competed in Mexican and international promotions during the 1980s and 1990s, most notably with Emilio Charles Jr. and Scorpio Jr. as part of the stable Los Talibanes. A second-generation wrestler, he was the son of Espectro II, the brother of Corazón Salvaje and the brother-in-law of Charrito de Oro.

During his career, he wrestled mainly for Empresa Mexicana de Lucha Libre (EMLL), later known as Consejo Mundial de Lucha Libre (CMLL). He had several feuds during his career, including ones against Ringo Mendoza, Mano Negra and Héctor Garza. He won the CMLL World Tag Team Championship twice with Scorpio Jr., and the CMLL World Trios Championship with Emilio Charles Jr. and Sangre Chicana. He wrestled the last match of his career two months before his death in January 2008 in Guadalajara, Mexico.

== Personal life ==
Juan Manuel Rodriguez Carillo was born on February 11, 1962, in Guadalajara, Jalisco, Mexico. He is the son of Espectro II. (Note: This was not the original "Espectro II" but someone who used the same ring name after the original retired.) His older brother wrestled under the ring name Príncipe Joel, while his younger brother has wrestled under the names "Corazón Salvaje" and "Azrael". Rodriguez was married to a professional wrestler called Maria del Angel.

== Professional wrestling career ==
Rodriguez made his professional debut on June 12, 1983, wrestling under the name Freddy Rodriguez in his hometown of Guadalajara. He continued in that role until 1986, when he became known as Bestia Salvaje.

=== Consejo Mundial de Lucha Libre (1987–2004) ===
On September 3, 1988, Bestia Salvaje defeated Águila Solitaria to win the Mexican National Welterweight Championship, the first title of his career. Later that month, on September 30, he successfully defended the championship against El Hijo del Santo at the EMLL 55th Anniversary Show. In October, he lost his first Lucha de Apuestas ("bet match") to El Dandy, which led to Salvaje being shaved bald afterward, per lucha libre traditions. After 176 days as champion, he lost the title to Ángel Azteca in February 1989. The following year, Salvaje began teaming on a regular basis with Pierroth Jr., winning the Mexican National Tag Team Championship from Azteca and Atlantis. Their 287-day reign ended when Azteca and Volador defeated him and Pierroth Jr. on March 9, 1991.

After the team broke up, Salvaje once again focused on his singles career, winning the CMLL World Middleweight Championship on September 4, 1992, by defeating El Dandy. He successfully defended the title against American Love Machine twice, Máscara Mágica and Kato Kung Lee, before El Dandy regained it on December 16. A storyline feud with Mano Negra culminated on December 3, 1993, at Juicio Final ("Final Judgment"), where Salvaje lost to Negra in a Lucha de Apuestas, forcing him to have all his hair shaved off.

==== Los Chacales (1995–1996) ====
In early 1995, Bestia Salvaje formed a trio with Emilio Charles Jr. and Sangre Chicana, referred to as Los Chacales ("The Jackals"). The trio was one of eight teams competing in the one-night Salvador Lutteroth Trios Tournament on March 24, defeating La Ola Blanca (Dr. Wagner Jr., Gran Markus Jr. and El Hijo del Gladiador) in the opening round, Dos Caras, El Dandy and Héctor Garza in the semi-finals and Los Brazos (Brazo de Oro, Brazo de Plata and El Brazo) in the finals. The following week, Los Chacales defeated La Ola Blanca to win the CMLL World Trios Championship, becoming the sixth overall championship winning team. Their reign as CMLL World Trios Champions lasted 357 days, before they lost it to Dos Caras, Garza and La Fiera at Homenaje a Salvador Lutteroth ("Homage to Salvador Lutteroth") on March 22, 1996. In June, Bestia Salvaje and Chicago Express won that year's Torneo Gran Alternativa ("Great Alternative Tournament"). The following month, Salvaje competed in the 3rd Annual Grand Prix Tournament, defeating Yone Genjin in the opening round before being eliminated by The Great Sasuke in the semi-finals.

==== Teaming with Scorpio Jr. (1996–1999) ====
After the break-up of Los Chacales, Bestia Salvaje formed a regular team with Scorpio Jr. The team became involved in a controversial storyline as they teamed with El Felino against Felino's brother Negro Casas, El Dandy and Garza. During the match, it appeared like El Felino turned on his brother, allowing Salvaje and Scorpio Jr. to double team Casas. However, during the final moments, El Felino removed his mask, revealing that it was actually El Hijo del Santo in disguise, making his surprise CMLL return after losing to Casas at the CMLL 63rd Anniversary Show. The surprise appearance of El Hijo del Santo and the attack on Casas resulted in a minor riot in Arena México. This led to Bestia and Scorpio Jr. teaming with El Hijo del Santo on a regular basis over the following two years, often opposite Casas and various partners. In late 1998, Salvaje and Scorpio Jr. turned on El Hijo del Santo during a match, leading to Negro Casas saving his former rival.

On November 13, Salvaje and Scorpio Jr. won the vacant CMLL World Tag Team Championship after defeating the teams of the Headhunters, Atlantis and Lizmark and El Satánico and Dr. Wagner Jr. in a tournament. The tag team championship became a focus of the storyline with El Hijo del Santo and Casas, which led to a match on February 5, 1999. Casas and Hijo del Santo won by disqualification and thus the championship as well, but refused to accept the belts due to how the match ended. The two teams had a rematch the following week, where Salvaje and Scorpio Jr. regained the championship. The storyline culminated at Homenaje a Dos Leyendas ("Homage to Two Legends") on March 19, where El Hijo del Santo risked his mask and Casas risked his hair as they defeated Salvaje and Scorpio Jr. in the main event. As a result of the loss, Bestia Salvaje was shaved bald, while the masked Scorpio Jr. was forced to remove his mask and reveal his name.

==== Los Guapos (1999–2002) ====
After Shocker lost his mask at the CMLL 66th Anniversary Show, he stated he was okay with being unmasked since his face was "1000% Guapo" ("1000% Handsome"). He developed a narcissistic, self-obsessed rudo character, who exhibited various metrosexual traits and looked down on those who were less handsome than him. Shocker began to team up with Bestia Salvaje and Scorpio Jr. on a regular basis. Following a series of vignettes, Shocker convinced both of his partners to have their hair bleached blond, stating they were also Guapo like him, thus forming a group known as Los Guapos. Neither Scorpio Jr. or Salvaje, who were older, seasoned veteran wrestlers, were actually considered good looking; Scorpio Jr.'s nickname up until that point had been El Rey Feo ("The Ugly King").

In 2000, Shocker was invited to work for New Japan Pro-Wrestling (NJPW) on several occasions, but due to his tours, Salvaje and Scorpio Jr. often found themselves without a partner for trios matches. Their solution was to bring in another veteran, Emilio Charles Jr., to become the fourth team member of Los Guapos; Charles Jr., like his partners, used the Guapo name more ironically than factually. After returning from NJPW, Shocker objected to someone joining "his" group without his approval, but at first went along with it. Over the following months, Shocker's displeasure with the rest of the team grew, leading to his split from the team and becoming a tecnico; this began a long-running storyline feud with Los Guapos. The storyline built to its peak in the main event of Sin Piedad ("No Mercy") on December 14. 2001, where Shocker defeated Charles Jr. in a Lucha de Apuestas, forcing Charles to have all his hair shaved off because he lost. As a result of the victory, Shocker regained the rights to the "Los Guapos" name.

==== Los Talibanes (2002–2004) ====
While Shocker reformed Los Guapos, initially with Máscara Mágica and later El Terrible, Bestia Salvaje, Scorpio Jr. and Emilio Charles Jr. became known as Los Talibanes ("The Taliban"). As part of their image change, all three wrestlers began wearing Bedouin robes and headdresses to the ring, pretending to be part of the terrorist group. The feud with Shocker and his group continued for the following two years, including several multi-man Lucha de Apuestas matches. On August 1, 2003, El Terrible defeated Salvaje in a domo de la muerte steel cage match that also included the other members of Los Talibanes and Los Guapos. The feud culminated in another six-way Lucha de Apuestas on September 24, 2004, which ended with Shocker pinning Salvaje, forcing him to have his hair shaved off afterward.

=== International Wrestling Revolution Group (2000–2007) ===
While working for CMLL, Bestia Salvaje also worked on occasion for International Wrestling Revolution Group (IWRG), based in Naucalpan, through a CMLL/IWRG arrangement. In one of his first appearances for IWRG, Los Guapos lost a match for the IWRG Intercontinental Trios Championship against Los Villanos (Villano III, Villano IV and Villano V). The same trio, now billed as Los Talibanes, returned to IWRG on October 17, 2002, to once again unsuccessfully challenge Los Villanos for the IWRG Intercontinental Trios Championship.

Once his stint with CMLL ended in 2004, Salvaje made regular appearances for IWRG. He was one of ten wrestlers to risk their hair or mask at El Castillo del Terror ("The Castle of Terror") on November 3, 2005, keeping his hair safe as Masada defeated Cerebro Negro. A month later, he left Cyborg bald after defeating him in a Lucha de Apuestas. His last major match was on March 18, 2007, where he was one of ten wrestlers to compete in an "Ultimate Jeopardy" steel cage match, where both the IWRG Intercontinental Welterweight Championship and the Mexican National Light Heavyweight Championship was on the line. In the end, Fantasma de la Opera pinned Cerebro Negro to win the welterweight championship, with Salvaje not involved in the finish of the match. Salvaje wrestled his last IWRG match on April 12, teaming with Cien Caras Jr. and Máscara Año 2000 Jr. to defeat Dr. Wagner Jr., El Hijo de Anibal and Rayo de Jalisco Jr. The final match of Rodriguez's career took place on January 6, 2008, as he, Bucanero Jr. and Príncipe Azteca wrestled Black Steel, El Hijo del Solitario and Gran Misterio in Guadalajara.

== Death ==
Rodriguez died on March 20, 2008, of liver disease. His wife, fellow wrestler Maria del Angel, died in 2014.

== Championships and accomplishments ==
- Consejo Mundial de Lucha Libre
  - CMLL World Middleweight Championship (1 time)
  - CMLL World Tag Team Championship (2 times) – with Scorpio Jr.
  - CMLL World Trios Championship (1 time) – with Emilio Charles Jr. and Sangre Chicana
  - Torneo Gran Alternativa (Trofeo Arena Coliseo, 1996) – with Chicago Express
  - Copa Arena Coliseo (1994) – with Cachorro Mendoza
  - Mexican National Tag Team Championship (1 time) – with Pierroth Jr.
  - Mexican National Welterweight Championship (1 time)
  - Salvador Lutteroth Trios Tournament – with Emilio Charles Jr. and Sangre Chicana
- Pro Wrestling Illustrated
  - PWI ranked him #326 of the 500 best singles wrestlers during the PWI Years in 2003

== Luchas de Apuestas record ==
| Winner (wager) | Loser (wager) | Location | Event | Date | Notes |
|---|---|---|---|---|---|
| El Dandy (hair) | Bestia Salvaje (hair) | Mexico City | CMLL show | October 2, 1988 | |
| Bestia Salvaje (hair) | Cachorro Mendoza (hair) | Mexico City | CMLL show | May 4, 1990 | |
| Bestia Salvaje (hair) | Huracán Sevilla (hair) | Mexico City | CMLL show | February 14, 1992 | |
| Bestia Salvaje (hair) | Kato Kung Lee (hair) | Mexico City | CMLL show | March 13, 1992 | |
| Bestia Salvaje (hair) | Ringo Mendoza (hair) | Mexico City | CMLL show | August 16, 1992 | |
| Mano Negra (hair) | Bestia Salvaje (hair) | Mexico City | Juicio Final | December 3, 1993 | |
| Bestia Salvaje (hair) | Black Power (hair) | Mexico City | CMLL show | February 2, 1995 | |
| Héctor Garza (hair) | Bestia Salvaje (hair) | Mexico City | Juicio Final | December 1, 1995 | (Note: This was a triangle match that also included El Satánico.) |
| Negro Casas (hair) | Bestia Salvaje (hair) | Mexico City | CMLL show | October 18, 1996 | |
| La Fiera (hair) | Bestia Salvaje (hair) | Mexico City | CMLL show | August 29, 1997 | |
| Negro Casas (hair) and El Hijo del Santo (mask) | Bestia Salvaje (hair) and Scorpio Jr. (mask) | Mexico City | 1999 Homenaje a Dos Leyendas | March 19, 1999 | |
| Negro Casas (hair) | Bestia Salvaje (hair) | Guadalajara, Jalisco | CMLL show | September 26, 1999 | |
| Perro Aguayo (hair) | Bestia Salvaje (hair) | Mexico City | 44. Aniversario de Arena México | April 14, 2000 | |
| Negro Casas (hair) | Bestia Salvaje (hair) | Nuevo Laredo, Tamaulipas | CMLL show | November 6, 2000 | |
| Halloween (hair) | Bestia Salvaje (hair) | Tijuana, Baja California | CMLL show | March 15, 2002 | (Note: This was a Los Guapos vs. la Familia de Tijuana hair match.) |
| El Terrible (hair) | Bestia Salvaje (hair) | Mexico City | CMLL show | August 1, 2003 | (Note: This was a steel cage match that also included Shocker, Máscara Mágica II, Scorpio Jr. and Emilio Charles Jr.) |
| Bestia Salvaje (hair) | Toro Blanco | Guadalajara, Jalisco | CMLL show | January 18, 2004 | |
| Shocker (hair) | Bestia Salvaje (hair) | Ciudad Madero, Tamaulipas | CMLL show | September 25, 2004 | (Note: This was a steel cage match that also included Zumbido, Negro Casas, El Terrible and Máscara Magica.) |
| Bestia Salvaje (hair) | Cyborg (hair) | Naucalpan, Mexico State | IWRG show | December 11, 2005 | |
| Bestia Salvaje (hair) | Américo Rocca (hair) | Guadalajara, Jalisco | Live event | February 11, 2007 | |

== See also ==
- List of premature professional wrestling deaths
