= Héctor Garza =

Mexican professional wrestler (1969–2013)

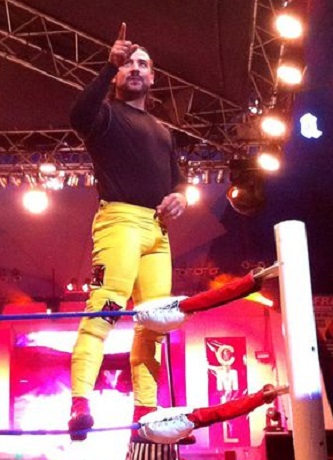
- Garza in 2010

Personal information
- Born: Héctor Solano Segura; June 12, 1969 Monterrey, Nuevo León, Mexico
- Died: May 26, 2013 (aged 43) Punta Allen, Quintana Roo, Mexico
- Cause of death: Lung cancer
- Children: El Sultán (son)
- Parent: Humberto Garza (father)
- Relatives: Humberto Garza Jr. (brother); Mario Segura (uncle); Angel Garza (nephew); Humberto Carrillo (nephew)

Professional wrestling career
- Ring name: Héctor Garza
- Billed height: 1.80 m (5 ft 11 in)
- Billed weight: 95 kg (209 lb)
- Billed from: Monterrey, Nuevo León, Mexico
- Trained by: Mr. Lince; Mario Segura; Blue Fish
- Debut: September 4, 1992
- Retired: October 7, 2012

Héctor Solano Segura (June 12, 1969 – May 26, 2013) was a Mexican professional wrestler, better known by the ring name Héctor Garza. During his career he worked for various major Mexican professional wrestling promotions such as Consejo Mundial de Lucha Libre (CMLL), Perros del Mal Producciones and, at the time of death, AAA. Garza also worked for several major promotions such as World Championship Wrestling (WCW), the World Wrestling Federation (WWF) and Total Nonstop Action Wrestling (TNA) in the United States.

Solano was a second-generation wrestler, son of Humberto Garza. His own son, known as El Sultán, also became a professional wrestler after Garza's death. The extended Garza family includes Angel Garza and Humberto Carrillo (formerly known as Último Ninja). In 2017 Garza Jr. adopted a ring persona similar to that of Solano, paying homage to his uncle's rudo ("bad guy") persona and wrestling style.

At the time of his death, Garza was in the middle of his second reign with the Mexican National Heavyweight Championship. He had also won the CMLL World Heavyweight Championship, the CMLL World Tag Team Championship three times, the CMLL World Trios Championship five times in CMLL and the IWC World Heavyweight Championship, the Mexican National Light Heavyweight Championship and the Mexican National Tag Team Championship. He was posthumously inducted in the AAA Hall of Fame.

== Professional wrestling career ==
After being trained by his uncle Mario Segura, and Mr. Lince and Blue Fish, Solano made his professional wrestling debut in 1992, using the ring name "Héctor Garza", after his father who worked as Humberto Garza. He initially wrestled for Federacion Internacional de Lucha Libre (FILL; "International Wrestling Federation" in Spanish) promotion in Monterrey, Nuevo León. As Garza, his first prominent storyline feud played out in 1993 as he was paired with El Sanguinario ("The Bloodthirsty One"), who portrayed a ruthless rudo (a "heel character", those that portray the "bad guys" in wrestling), juxtaposed with the young, fan-friendly técnico (or "face character", those who portray the "good guys"). On June 6, 1993, Garza won his first Lucha de Apuestas, or "Bet match", when he defeated El Sanguinario to force El Sanguinario to be shaved bald as a result. Two months later, Garza defeated Sanguinario once more, this time to win the FILL Light Heavyweight Championship.

=== Consejo Mundial de Lucha Libre (1994–1996) ===
After his local success in Monterrey, Consejo Mundial de Lucha Libre (CMLL) hired him to work nationally instead, joining the world's oldest professional wrestling promotion as part of CMLL's rebuilding after a split that led to the creation of Asistencia Asesoría y Administración (AAA). He was put over veteran rudos like Bestia Salvaje and Satánico in hair matches and Garza quickly became one of the top técnicos in the company. In the following year, he teamed with Dos Caras and La Fiera to win the CMLL World Trios Championship, and lost to Emilio Charles Jr. in the final of the La Copa Junior, a tournament for second-generation wrestlers.

=== AAA / World Wrestling Federation (1996–1997) ===
When Garza joined AAA, he was also able to work for the US-based World Wrestling Federation (WWF) through AAA's working agreement. His first televised WWF appearance saw him defeat T.L. Hopper on an episode of Superstars. At the 1997 Royal Rumble pay-per-view show Garza teamed up with El Canek and Perro Aguayo to defeat Fuerza Guerrera, Heavy Metal and Jerry Estrada. He worked several more matches for the WWF, with his last appearance for the company taking place on March 10, 1997, where he, Latin Lover and Octagón lost to Pentagón, Heavy Metal and Pierroth on the 200th episode of Monday Night Raw.

In AAA he often worked as part of a trio known as La Maquina del Amor ("The Love Machine") alongside Heavy Metal and Latin Lover, a group of young, good looking, fan favorites that were very popular with the female fans. All three members of La Maquina del Amor qualified for the 1997 Rey de Reyes tournament along with Octagón, which Latin Lover won. Later that year Garza teamed up with Super Nova for the "Young Stars" tag team tournament. In the first round the duo defeated May Flowers and Pentagón, but lost to Fuerza Guerra and Mosco de la Merced in the semi-finals.

=== World Championship Wrestling (1997–1999) ===
==== Cruiserweight division (1997–1998) ====
The AAA/WWF collaboration ended in mid-1997, which led to many AAA workers wrestling for WWF's rival, World Championship Wrestling (WCW), later in the year. Garza made his WCW debut on May 20 by defeating Psychosis at a live event. He made his televised debut in WCW on the May 26 episode of Monday Nitro by teaming with Juventud Guerrera and Super Calo to defeat Ciclope, Damien and La Parka in a six-man tag team match. His first televised singles match in WCW took place on the June 7 episode of Saturday Night against Billy Kidman, which Garza won. The young Garza would become known in WCW for his twirling turnbuckle to floor plancha called the "corkscrew plancha". On the June 30 episode of Nitro, Garza received his first title shot in WCW as he unsuccessfully challenged Lord Steven Regal for the World Television Championship. The following month, he made his first pay-per-view appearance in WCW at Bash at the Beach, where he teamed with Juventud Guerrera and Lizmark Jr. to defeat La Parka, Psychosis and Villano IV.

On the September 22 episode of Nitro, Garza enjoyed the biggest moment of his WCW career by scoring an upset victory over Scott Hall. The victory was played off as a "fluke" and Hall defeated Garza two weeks later on Nitro in just over a minute as a follow-up to the storyline. Garza competed in the World War 3 battle royal at the namesake event for a future WCW World Heavyweight Championship opportunity but failed to win the match. Garza continued to team with and compete against various luchadors in tag team matches and singles competition while alternating between WCW and Mexico. He took a hiatus from WCW in early 1998 and competed in his native Mexico throughout the year. He returned to WCW on the September 7 episode of Nitro by unsuccessfully challenging Juventud Guerrera for the Cruiserweight Championship.

==== Latino World Order (1998–1999) ====
On the October 5 episode of Nitro, Eddie Guerrero interrupted a match between Garza and Damien and prevented luchadors from fighting each other and instead urging them to unite which resulted in the formation of Guerrero's new faction Latino World Order (lWo), consisting of the underutilized Mexican wrestlers on the WCW, with Garza joining in as one of the pioneer members of the group. The group began feuding with Rey Misterio Jr. as he refused to join the lWo. The following month, at World War 3, Garza participated in the namesake battle royal for a future World Heavyweight Championship opportunity but failed to win. LWO prematurely disbanded in 1999 after Guerrero was injured in a car accident and the New World Order attacked various LWO members and threatened them to disband with the President Ric Flair urging them to disband the group and fight on WCW side with the promise of a better treatment than Eric Bischoff.

Following the dissolution of LWO, Garza resumed competing in WCW's lower mid-card, competing mostly against fellow luchadors while also serving as an enhancement talent to upper mid-card wrestlers. Garza's final televised match in WCW took place on the February 18 episode of Thunder, where he teamed with Silver King against Konnan and Rey Misterio Jr. in a losing effort. Garza's last match for WCW took place at a live event on October 1, where he teamed with King to defeat Los Villanos (Villano IV and Villano V). Garza was released from his WCW contract in November 1999 as part of mass releases including twenty-one other wrestlers due to budget cuts.

=== AAA (1999–2004) ===
In late 1999, Garza returned to AAA where he became involved in a long-running storyline feud with Heavy Metal, Latin Lover and Perro Aguayo Jr. that would span several years. On December 26, 1999, Héctor Garza defeated Pirata Morgan to win the IWC World Heavyweight Championship, his first championship reign in AAA. 98 days later, Garza lost the championship back to Pirata Morgan. Two months later Garza defeated Sangre Chicana to win the Mexican National Light Heavyweight Championship on a show in his home town of Monterrey.

As part of their ongoing storyline, Garza and Aguayo Jr. teamed up to defeat Los Vipers (Abismo Negro and Electroshock) to win the Mexican National Tag Team Championship, starting a 61-day reign. Their reign was ended by El Texano and Pirata Morgan on September 8, 2000. The four-way feud led to a Lucha de Apuetas match between Garza and Heavy Metal as part of AAA's 2001 Guerra de Titanes PPV. The match saw Garza pin Heavy Metal in the third and deciding fall, forcing Heavy Metal to have all of his hair shaved off.

After the 2001 Guerra de Titanes the feud shifted to focusing on Garza and Latin Lover instead. On May 5, 2002, Garza defeated Latin Lover to win the Mexican National Heavyweight Championship as part of the escalating tension between the two. On November 15, 2002, at that year's Guerra de Titanes show, Garza, Latin Lover, Perro Aguayo Jr. and Mr. Águila faced off in a steel cage match. Latin Lover defeated Garza, causing him to have his hair shaved off for the first time in his career. On May 5, 2003, he lost the Mexican National Heavyweight Championship to E; Zorro, exactly one year after winning it. On October 26, 2003, Garza lost another Lucha de Apuestas match to Latin Lover, which turned out to be his last major storyline in AAA.

=== Total Nonstop Action Wrestling (2004) ===
In 2004, he returned to the United States for Total Nonstop Action Wrestling during AAA's working agreement with the company. Along with Abismo Negro, Juventud Guerrera, Mr. Águila and later Heavy Metal, "Team Mexico" was successful in winning the America's X-Cup. After Team Canada was repackaged, Team Mexico became faces. In June, he returned to CMLL.

While the AAA-TNA deal was still in effect, Garza wrestled exclusively in Mexico. In CMLL, he helped Perro Aguayo Jr. adopt a "heel" character, becoming one of the "bad guys" in wrestling, and became involved in Aguayo's storyline feud with El Hijo del Santo. Eventually, he would help found La Furia del Norte with El Terrible and Tarzan Boy. Teaming with Tarzan and Terrible, La Furia chased after and defeated the CMLL Tríos champions Black Warrior, El Canek and Rayo de Jalisco Jr. Meanwhile, in the United States, the AAA-TNA deal was terminated, which led to TNA to bringing Garza back. He returned for TNA Victory Road 2004, TNA's first three-hour pay-per-view when he won a Twenty Man X-Division Gauntlet. The push continued with a match against NWA World Heavyweight Champion Jeff Jarrett on TNA's weekly TV show.

=== Consejo Mundial de Lucha Libre (2005–2011) ===
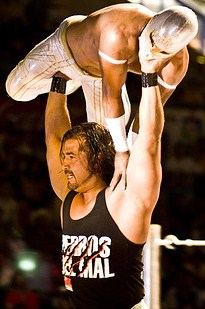
Garza, in a Perros del Mal shirt, lifting Místico in the air during a CMLL match

After being deported for drug possession, he returned to working full-time in Mexico for CMLL. He teamed with Perro Aguayo Jr. against Los Capos and became a major part of the new group, Los Perros del Mal along with members of La Furia del Norte, Los Pierroths and La Familia de Tijuana. In August, Pierroth Jr. was ejected from the group and Garza volunteered to face him in a hair vs. hair match, which Garza won. After the Dr. Wagner Jr. vs. Atlantis mask vs. mask match fell through, CMLL decided to go with Héctor Garza and Perro Aguayo Jr. vs. Universo 2000 and Máscara Año 2000 double hair vs. hair match as the main event of the CMLL 72nd Anniversary Show. Three weeks before the show, Garza hit Máscara Año 2000 with a "Martinete" (tombstone piledriver). The match for the anniversary show was changed to a triangle match with Universo 2000 vs. Perro Aguayo Jr. vs. Héctor Garza where the last man to get pinned gets his hair shaved. In the end, Universo pinned Garza with help of a low blow from his brother, Cien Caras, and Pierroth's valet, La Nazi.

In 2008 Garza began teaming with El Hijo del Fantasma and La Máscara and the trio quickly won the vacant CMLL World Trios Championship when they defeated Blue Panther, Dos Caras Jr. and Místico in the finals of a tournament for the title. The team lost, then regained the trios title to the team of Atlantis, Último Guerrero and Negro Casas. In March 2010 signs of dissention amongst the team began showing as Garza left the ring during a trios match mistakenly thinking that one of his teammates had attacked him. Following this Garza kept insincerely insisting that he was still a tecnico and that his team was getting along great. Further doubts about Garza's allegiance arose when he teamed up with the Rúdo Pólvora for the 2010 Gran Alternativa tournament. The team defeated Sensei and La Máscara in the first round with Garza showing no problems in going after his teammate. They also defeated Rey Cometa and Blue Panther as well as Diamante and La Sombra to qualify for the finals. On the April 30, 2010 Super Viernes Garza and Pólvora won the 2010 Gran Alternativa when they defeated Delta and Volador Jr. When Garza, La Máscara and Hijo del Fantasma were booked for a CMLL World Trios defense the following week, Garza complained that his partners had agreed to the match without asking him, but swore that he would still be professional about it. During the title defense on the May 7, 2010 Super Viernes Garza attacked both Hijo del Fantasma and La Máscara, allowing La Ola Amarillo (Hiroshi Tanahashi, Okumura and Taichi) to win the CMLL World Trios Championship, turning full blown Rudo in the process.

==== Los Invasores (2010) ====
During a trios match with the Los Invasores team of El Alebrije, Histeria and Maniaco going against Garza, Brazo de Plata and Toscano, Garza turned on his teammates and joined Los Invasores. CMLL held a press conference on May 20, 2010, announcing that they would hold a special Sin Salida event on June 6, 2010, that would center around the Los Invasores vs. CMLL storyline. During the press conference Olímpico was part of the Invasores group. It was also announced that Garza and Mr. Águila were the co-leaders of Los Invasores. At the July 16, 2010 Super Viernes Héctor Garza and Mr. Águila defeated the team of La Sombra and Volador Jr. to win the CMLL World Tag Team Championship, Garza's third reign and Mr. Águila's first reign. On November 2, 2010, Garza and Águila lost the CMLL World Tag Team Championship to Dragón Rojo Jr. and Último Guerrero.

==== World Heavyweight Champion (2011) ====
On January 4, 2011, Garza made his debut for New Japan Pro-Wrestling (NJPW) at Wrestle Kingdom V in Tokyo Dome, where he and Jushin Thunder Liger were defeated by Máscara Dorada and La Sombra in a tag team match. Garza returned for a tour of New Japan on July 8, 2011. His tour of the promotion concluded on July 18, when he was defeated by CMLL World Middleweight Champion, Jushin Thunder Liger in a non-title match. Upon Garza's return to CMLL, he turned technico and left Los Invasores. On August 12, Garza defeated Último Guerrero to win the CMLL World Heavyweight Championship for the first time.

=== Perros del Mal Producciones (2011–2012) ===
On November 11, 2011, Garza held a press conference, announcing that he had left CMLL and joined Perro Aguyao Jr.'s Perros del Mal Producciones as a member of the Perros del Mal stable. Before leaving CMLL, Garza handed the World Heavyweight Championship belt back to the promotion. Behind the scenes, Garza had offered to lose the title to El Terrible prior to leaving the promotion, but CMLL refused to allow him to wrestle another match. Garza made his debut for the promotion on November 13, when he ran in to save Perro Aguayo Jr., Damián 666, Halloween and X-Fly from Los Psycho Circus, Nosawa and Zumbi. The following day, Garza returned to AAA, when he, along with members of Los Perros del Mal, attacked El Mesías and Jack Evans, after they had defeated Aguayo and Chessman in a match. On December 16 at Guerra de Titanes, Garza, Aguayo and Halloween defeated Evans, Fénix and Drago in a six-man tag team match. On February 14, 2012, Garza defeated champion X-Fly, El Hijo del Perro Aguayo, El Mesías, El Texano Jr. and Toscano in a six-way elimination match at a Perros del Mal Producciones event to win the Mexican National Heavyweight Championship for the second time. On August 5 at Triplemanía XX, Garza's accidental chair shot to El Hijo del Perro Aguayo cost the Perros del Mal leader his match for the AAA Mega Championship. On August 10, Los Perros del Mal turned on Garza and kicked him out of the stable.

== Personal life ==
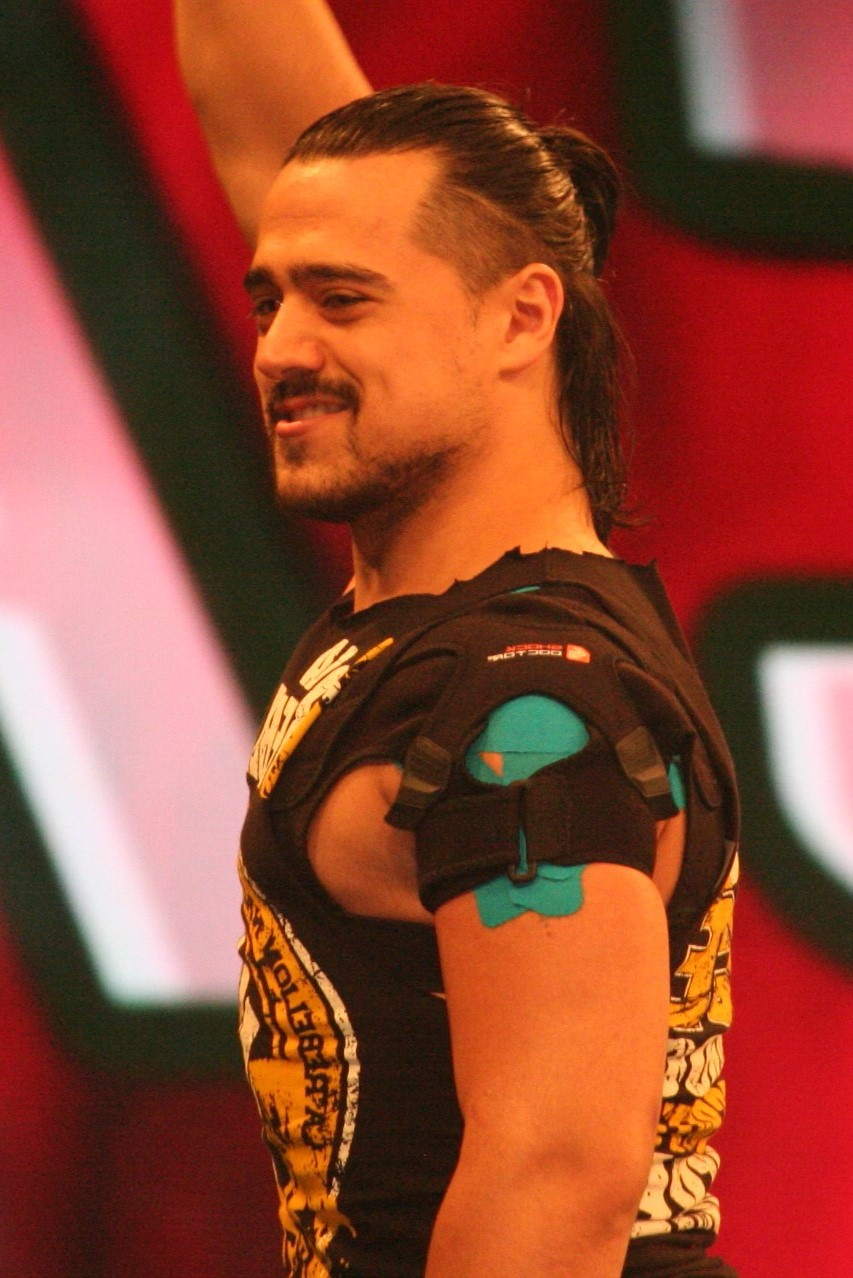
Solano's nephew who worked under the name Garza Jr. in tribute to his uncle

Héctor Solano Segura was born on June 12, 1969, in Monterrey, Nuevo León, Mexico, son of professional wrestler Humberto Garza. His brother works as a professional wrestler and promoter under the ring name "Humberto Garza Jr." and his son, originally known as "Último Ninja" in Mexico and "Humberto Carrillo" in NXT, is a professional wrestler, using the name El Sultán. His uncle is Mike Segura, better known under the ring name "El Ninja". Solano's cousin is known as "El Ninja Jr.", and his nephew, Humberto Garza Solano, works under the ring name Angel Garza.

In 2005, Solano was set to wrestle Scott Hall at TNA's Final Resolution 2005 but was arrested in Houston, Texas, for possession of steroids. The police found Deca-Durabolin and Primobolan, both of which are legal to have and use in Mexico, but not in the United States, and Solano claimed that he had legal prescriptions for them but could not produce them at the time of his arrest. Solano was deported back to Mexico and barred from entry for a number of years, effectively ending his career in the United States. Garza claimed that he did not know the steroids were illegal in the United States and that he was humiliated by the guards.

=== Illness and death ===
On October 15, 2012, a press release revealed that Solano had been diagnosed with lung cancer. He retired from active competition to undergo chemotherapy and additional treatment. He died on May 26, 2013, from the cancer at the age of 43. He was the reigning Mexican National Heavyweight Champion at the time of his death. As a result of his death, the "Comisión de Box y Lucha Libre Mexico D.F." (the Mexico City Boxing and Wrestling Commission) deemed the Mexican National Heavyweight Championship inactive.

== Legacy ==
On August 9, 2015, at Triplemanía XXIII, Garza was inducted into the AAA Hall of Fame. When his nephew Humberto Garza Solano began working for Lucha Libre AAA Worldwide, he changed his ring name from "El Hijo del Ninja" to "Garza Jr." in honor of his uncle, adopting both the look and some of the mannerisms and wrestling moves that his uncle had become known for.

=== Solano/Segura family tree ===
† = deceased

Humberto Garza	Unidentified Garza	Mario Segura	Unidentified Garza
Héctor Garza †	Humberto Garza Jr.	Unidentified	Ninja Jr.	Máscara Púrpura
El Sultán	Humberto Carrillo	Angel Garza

== Championships and accomplishments ==
- AAA / Asistencia Asesoría y Administración
  - IWC World Heavyweight Championship (2 times)
  - Mexican National Heavyweight Championship (2 times)
  - Mexican National Light Heavyweight Championship (1 time)
  - Mexican National Tag Team Championship (1 time) – with Perro Aguayo Jr.
  - AAA Hall of Fame (Class of 2015)
- Consejo Mundial de Lucha Libre
  - CMLL World Heavyweight Championship (1 time)
  - CMLL World Tag Team Championship (3 times) – with Místico (2) and Mr. Águila (1)
  - CMLL World Trios Championship (5 times) – with La Fiera and Dos Caras (1), Tarzan Boy and El Terrible (1), Mr. Águila and Perro Aguayo Jr. (1), and El Hijo del Fantasma and La Mascara (2)
  - CMLL Trio of the year: 2009 (with La Máscara and Hijo del Fantasma)
  - La Copa Junior: 1996
  - Torneo Gran Alternativa 1994, 2010 – with Negro Casas (1994), with Pólvora (2010)
- Federación Internacional de Lucha Libre
  - FILL Light Heavyweight Championship (1 time)
- Lucha Libre Azteca
  - Azteca Championship (1 time)
- Perros del Mal Producciones
  - Mexican National Heavyweight Championship (1 time)
- Pro Wrestling Illustrated
  - Ranked No. 283 of the 500 best singles wrestlers of the PWI Years in 2003
  - Ranked No. 19 of the 500 best singles wrestlers of the PWI 500 in 2004
- Total Nonstop Action Wrestling
  - America's X Cup (2004) – with Mr. Águila, Juventud Guerrera, Abismo Negro and Heavy Metal
  - TNA Year End Award (1 time)
    - Who to Watch in 2005 (2004)
- Universal Wrestling Association
  - UWA World Middleweight Championship (1 time)
- World Wrestling Association
  - WWA World Tag Team Championship (1 time) – Perro Aguayo Jr.

== Luchas de Apuestas record ==
Winner (wager)	Loser (wager)	Location	Event	Date	Notes
Héctor Garza (hair)	Sanguinario (hair)	Monterrey, Nuevo León	FULL show	June 27, 1993	
Héctor Garza (hair)	El Satánico (hair)	Mexico City	39. Aniversario de Arena México	April 7, 1994	
Héctor Garza (hair)	El Brazo (hair)	Mexico City	CMLL show	August 4, 1995	
Héctor Garza (hair)	MS-1 (hair)	Puebla, Puebla	CMLL show	November 27, 1995	
Héctor Garza (hair)	Bestia Salvaje (hair)	Mexico City	Super Viernes	December 1, 1995	(Note: This was a three-way match that also included El Satánico.)
Héctor Garza (hair)	El Satánico (hair)	Mexico City	Super Viernes	December 15, 1995	
Héctor Garza (hair)	Pirata Morgan (hair)	Puebla, Puebla	CMLL Lunes Arena Puebla	July 29, 1996	
Héctor Garza (hair)	Kick Boxer (hair)	Ciudad Juárez, Chihuahua	AAA show	July 23, 2000	(Note: Garza and Kick Boxer were the last two men in a steel cage match that saw Garza and Heavy Metal wrestle Kick Boxer and Toro Irisson.)
Héctor Garza (hair)	Toro Irisson (hair)	Xalapa, Veracruz	AAA show	October 27, 2000	(Note: This was a steel cage match.)
Héctor Garza (hair)	Heavy Metal (hair)	Mexico City	Guerra de Titanes	November 11, 2001	(Note: This was a four-way match that also included with Perro Aguayo Jr. and Latin Lover.)
Héctor Garza (hair)	Pimpinela Escarlata (hair)	Monterrey, Nuevo León	FULL show	July 6, 2003	
Latin Lover (hair)	Héctor Garza (hair)	Monterrey, Nuevo León	AAA show	October 26, 2003	
Héctor Garza (hair)	Pierroth Jr. (hair)	Mexico City	Super Viernes	August 19, 2005	
Universo 2000 (hair)	Héctor Garza (hair)	Mexico City	CMLL 72nd Anniversary Show	September 16, 2005	(Note: This was a three-way match that also included Perro Aguayo Jr.)
Héctor Garza (hair)	Super Parka (hair)	Monterrey, Nuevo León	FULL show	March 18, 2007	(Note: Ruleta de La Muerte match that also included Dr. Wagner Jr, Místico, Averno, Damián 666, Atlantis and Héctor Garza.)
Perro Aguayo Jr. (hair)	Héctor Garza (hair)	Mexico City	Homenaje a Dos Leyendas	March 21, 2008	

== See also ==
- List of premature professional wrestling deaths
