= Mano Negra (wrestler) =

Mexican professional wrestler

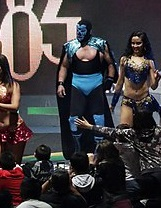
- Mano Negra making his entrance on November 30, 2018

Personal information
- Born: Jesús Reza Rosales; January 15, 1951 (age 75) Torreón, Coahuila, Mexico
- Children: Mano Negra Jr. (son); Sanely (daughter); El Hijo de Mano Negra (son)
- Parent: El Rebelde (father)
- Relative: Black Warrior (son-in-law)

Professional wrestling career
- Ring name(s): Mano Negra; Sangre Blanca I
- Billed height: 1.78 m (5 ft 10 in)
- Billed weight: 95 kg (209 lb)
- Trained by: El Rebelde; Diablo Velazco; Rafael Salamanca; Rolando Vera
- Debut: October 1, 1971
- Retired: 2020

Jesús Reza Rosales (born January 15, 1951) is a Mexican professional wrestler, best known under the ring name Mano Negra. Mano Negra is Spanish for "The Black Hand" and is taken from the Spanish anarchist organization La Mano Negra. Rosales is a former two time holder of the NWA World Welterweight Championship, two time holder of the NWA World Light Heavyweight Championship, and the Mexican National Light Heavyweight Championship while working for Empresa Mexicana de Lucha Libre (EMLL). He also worked for the Universal Wrestling Association (UWA) where he held the UWA World Junior Light Heavyweight Championship and for the World Wrestling Association (WWA) where he held the WWA Lightweight Championship. Mano Negra was originally an masked wrestler, but lost a Lucha de Apuesta, bet match, to Atlantis in the main event of CMLL's 60th Anniversary Show and was forced to unmask.

== Professional wrestling career ==
Jesús Rosales trained under world-renowned professional wrestling trainer Diablo Velazco as well as his father, wrestler El Rebelde as well as Rafael Salamanca and Rolando Vera before making his professional wrestling debut in 1971. Upon his debut he adopted the ring name Mano Negra ("The Black Hand") and was inspired by the Spanish anarchist organization La Mano Negra. Rosales adopted a black mask with blue trim, a black and blue outfit and a black glove for his "black hand". On December 14, 1973, just three years after his debut he won the NWA World Welterweight Championship by defeating Karloff Lagarde in the finals of an Empresa Mexicana de Lucha Libre (EMLL) held tournament for the vacant title. Mano Negra held the title for 562 days, regularly defending it on EMLL's main shows in Arena México, before losing the championship to Blue Demon on June 29, 1975. It would take over a year before Mano Negra was able to regain the championship, pinning Fishman for the championship on November 19, 1976. His second reign with the welterweight title lasted for 892 days in total, one of the longest reigns in the history of the title, ending on April 30, 1979, when he lost to Américo Rocca. In the early 1980s Mano Negra moved from the Welterweight division (with an upper limit of 78 kg (172 lb)) to the Light Heavyweight division (with an upper limit of 97 kg (214 lb)) when he defeated Babe Face to win the Mexican National Light Heavyweight Championship on July 30, 1983. The reign lasted exactly 400 days before Valente Férnandez won the title from him on September 2, 1984. The following year Mano Negra won the Universal Wrestling Association's UWA World Junior Light Heavyweight Championship, defeating Negro Navarro for the championship. The following year Mano Negra began a long-term storyline feud with El Cobarde II, a feud that saw Cobarde II win the UWA World Junior Light Heavyweight Championship from Mano Negra in late 1985, but saw Mano Negra gain the ultimate measure of revenge when he defeated El Cobarde II in a Lucha de Apuesta, mask vs. mask match on August 10, 1986, and forced Cobarde II to unmask after the match.

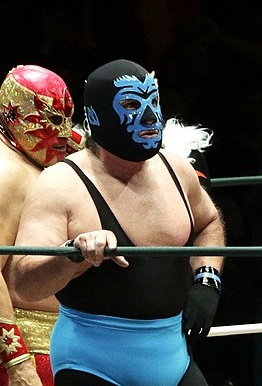
Mano Negra (front) and El Solar on November 30, 2018

In the early 1990s, Mano Negra's career saw a resurgence as he began a feud with the very popular Atlantis. The storyline started out with Mano Negra defeating Atlantis for the NWA World Middleweight Championship on March 3, 1993. Mano Negra was in turn defeated by Oro only two months later, but regained the middleweight title on July 3, 1993. In September 1993, at CMLL's 60th Anniversary Show, Atlantis and Mano Negra faced off in the main event of the evening with both wrestlers putting their mask on the line in a Lucha de Apuesta match. After three highly competitive falls, Atlantis defeated Mano Negra. After the match Mano Negra was unmasked for the first time and had to reveal that his real name was Jesús Reza Rosales, which is traditional after a Lucha de Apuesta loss. On December 7, 1993, Mano Negra's last title run came to an end when he lost to Corazón de León. Mano Negra worked for CMLLuntil around 1996 when he began working on the Mexican independent circuit. In 2009 he made a series of appearances for International Wrestling Revolution Group (IWRG).

== Personal life ==
Jesús Rosales is the son of Luchador El Rebelde and two of his sons and a daughter are in turn also professional wrestlers. His oldest son competed using the ring name "Mano Negra Jr.", wearing a mask that is very similar to the mask his father used to wear. His youngest son works under the name "El Hijo de Mano Negra" ("The Son of Mano Negra"), while his daughter competes under the name Sanely. One of Rosales' daughters is married to Black Warrior and the mother of Warrior Jr.

== Championships and accomplishments ==
- Empresa Mexicana de Lucha Libre
  - Mexican National Light Heavyweight Championship (1 time)
  - NWA World Middleweight Championship (2 times)
  - NWA World Welterweight Championship (2 times)
- Universal Wrestling Association
  - UWA World Junior Heavyweight Championship (1 time)
- World Wrestling Association
  - WWA Lightweight Championship (1 time)

== Luchas de Apuestas record ==
Winner (wager)	Loser (wager)	Location	Event	Date	Notes
Mano Negra (mask)	Asesino Blanco (mask)	Tijuana, Baja California	Live event	N/A	
Mano Negra (mask)	Gorilita Flores Jr. (hair)	N/A	Live event	N/A	
Mano Negra (mask)	Demonio Blanco (mask)	Mexico City	Live event	December 10, 1976	
Mano Negra (mask)	the Invader (mask)	Naucalpan, Mexico State	Live event	February 20, 1983	
Mano Negra (mask)	El Cobarde II (mask)	Mexico City	Live event	August 10, 1986	
Mano Negra (mask)	Frankenstein (mask)	Ciudad Juárez, Chihuahua	Live event	1987	
Mano Negra (mask)	Gran Markus (hair)	Torreón, Coahuila	Live event	December 4, 1987	
Atlantis (mask)	Mano Negra (mask)	Mexico City	CMLL 60th Anniversary Show	October 1, 1993	
Mano Negra (hair)	Bestia Salvaje (hair)	Mexico City	Live event	December 3, 1993	
Brazo de Plata (hair)	Mano Negra (hair)	Mexico City	Live event	April 15, 1997	
El Celestial (hair)	Mano Negra (hair)	Panama City, Panama	Live event	January 24, 1999	
Mano Negra (hair)	Mr. Mexico (hair)	Mexico City	Live event	March 4, 2001	
Justiciero (hair)	Mano Negra (hair)	Coacalco, Mexico State	Live event	October 2003	
Justiciero (hair)	Mano Negra (hair)	Coacalco, Mexico State	Live event	February 4, 2001	
El Hijo del Santo (mask)	Mano Negra (hair)	Tijuana, Baja California	Live event	November 24, 2006	
Villano III (hair)	Mano Negra (hair)	Mateos, Mexico State	Live event	November 25, 2007	
Shu El Guerrero (mask)	Mano Negra (hair)	Mateos, Mexico State	Live event	February 14, 2009	(Note: This was a Steel cage match that also included El Canek, Dos Caras, Mil Mascaras, Villano III, and Villano V.)
