= Homenaje a Dos Leyendas: El Santo y Salvador Lutteroth =

Homenaje a Dos Leyendas: El Santo y Salvador Lutteroth may refer to any of the following events:

- Homenaje a Dos Leyendas: El Santo y Salvador Lutteroth (1999)
- Homenaje a Dos Leyendas: El Santo y Salvador Lutteroth (2000)
- Homenaje a Dos Leyendas: El Santo y Salvador Lutteroth (2001)
- Homenaje a Dos Leyendas: El Santo y Salvador Lutteroth (2002)
- Homenaje a Dos Leyendas: El Santo y Salvador Lutteroth (2003)
- Homenaje a Dos Leyendas: El Santo y Salvador Lutteroth (2004)

== See also ==
- Homenaje a Dos Leyendas, a series of annual wrestling events
- Homenaje a Salvador Lutteroth (disambiguation)
