= Homenaje a Dos Leyendas: El Santo y Salvador Lutteroth (1999) =

Mexican Professional wrestling show

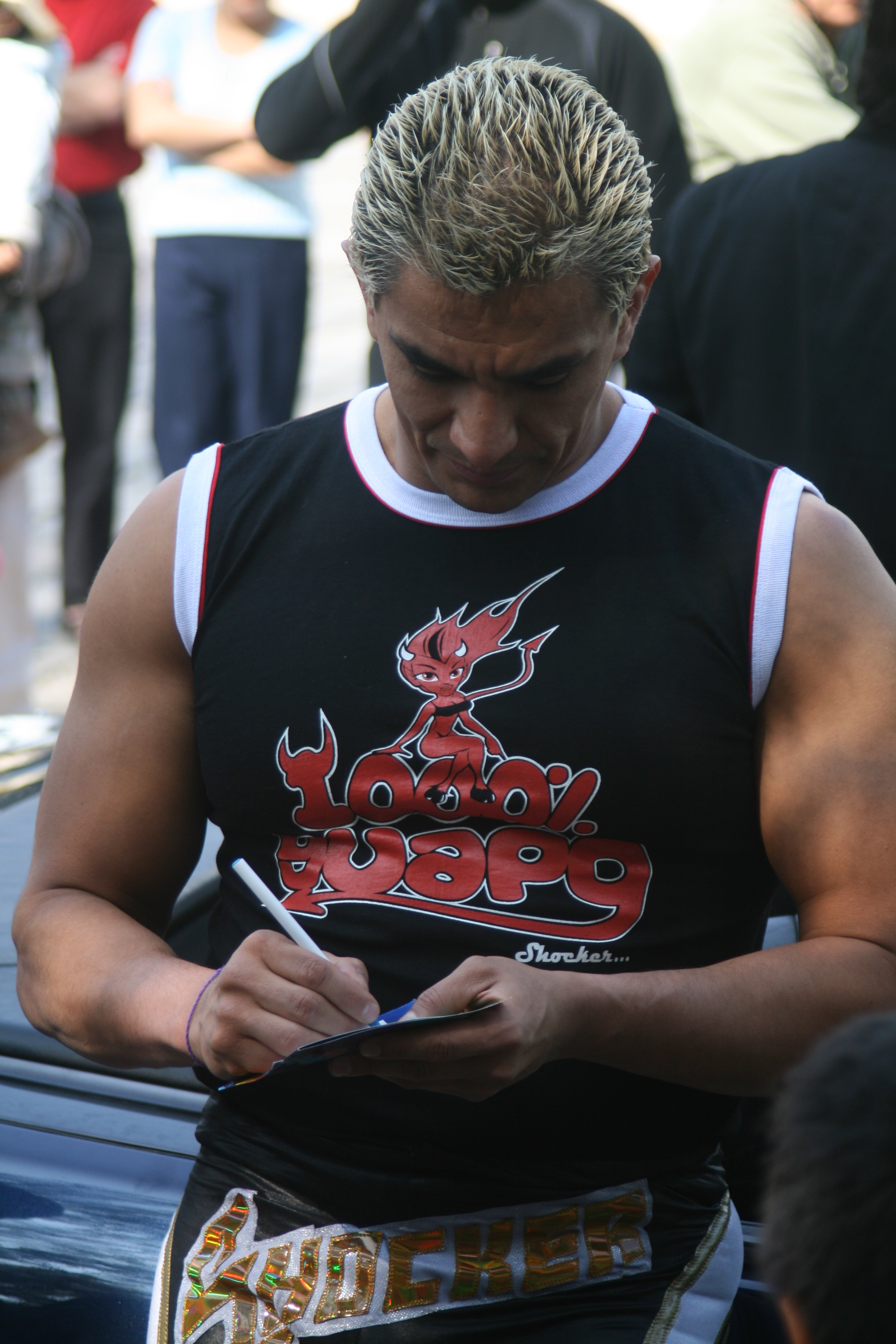
- Shocker, along with Mr. Niebla, finalists of the Torneo Salvador Lutteroth Tag Team Tournament
- Promotion: Consejo Mundial de Lucha Libre
- Date: March 19, 1999
- City: Mexico City, Mexico
- Venue: Arena México

Event chronology
| ← Previous; Juicio Final | Next → Torneo Gran Alternativa |

Homenaje a Dos Leyendas chronology
| ← Previous; 1998 | Next → 2000 |

Homenaje a Dos Leyendas: El Santo y Salvador Lutteroth (1999) (Spanish for "Homage to Two Legends: El Santo and Salvador Lutteroth") was a professional wrestling supercard show event, scripted and produced by Consejo Mundial de Lucha Libre (CMLL; "World Wrestling Council"). The Dos Leyendas show took place on March 19, 1999 in CMLL's main venue, Arena México, Mexico City, Mexico. The event was to honor and remember CMLL founder Salvador Lutteroth, who died in March 1987. This was the first major March show under the Homenaje a Dos Leyendas name, having previously been known as Homenaje a Salvador Lutteroth. Starting in 1999 CMLL honored not just their founder, but also El Santo, the most famous Mexican professional wrestler ever. The name of the annual March event would later be shortened to just Homenaje a Dos Leyendas after CMLL had a falling out with El Santo's son El Hijo del Santo, with the event honoring a different wrestler along with Lutteroth.

The main event was a tag team match between the team of Hijo del Santo and Negro Casas and the team of Bestia Salvaje and Scorpio Jr. under Lucha de Apuestas ("Bet Match") rules. As a result of their loss, Scorpio Jr. was forced to unmask and Bestia Salvaje had all his hair shaved off after the match. The show also hosted the Torneo Salvador Lutteroth Tag Team tournament, honoring the founder of CMLL Salvador Lutteroth. The one night tournament included eight teams in total, and ended with Ringo Mendoza and Super Astro defeating Mr. Niebla and Shocker to win the entire tournament. The card also featured a non-tournament tag team match, a one on one match and a three vs. four handicap match.

== Production ==
=== Background ===
Since 1996 the Mexican wrestling company Consejo Mundial de Lucha Libre (Spanish for "World Wrestling Council"; CMLL) has held a show in March each year to commemorate the passing of CMLL founder Salvador Lutteroth who died in March 1987. For the first three years the show paid homage to Lutteroth himself, from 1999 through 2004 the show paid homage to Lutteroth and El Santo, Mexico's most famous wrestler ever and from 2005 forward the show has paid homage to Lutteroth and a different leyenda ("Legend") each year, celebrating the career and accomplishments of past CMLL stars. Originally billed as Homenaje a Salvador Lutteroth, it has been held under the Homenaje a Dos Leyendas ("Homage to two legends") since 1999 and is the only show outside of CMLL's Anniversary shows that CMLL has presented every year since its inception. All Homenaje a Dos Leyendas shows have been held in Arena México in Mexico City, Mexico, which is CMLL's main venue, its "home". Traditionally CMLL holds their major events on Friday Nights, which means the Homenaje a Dos Leyendas shows replace their regularly scheduled Super Viernes show. The 1999 show was the fourth overall Homenaje show and the first dedicated to both Salvador Lutteroth and El Santo.

=== Storylines ===
The Homenaje a Dos Leyendas show featured eleven professional wrestling matches with different wrestlers involved in pre-existing scripted feuds, plots and storylines. Wrestlers were portrayed as either heels (referred to as rudos in Mexico, those that portray the "bad guys") or faces (técnicos in Mexico, the "good guy" characters) as they followed a series of tension-building events, which culminated in a wrestling match or series of matches.

In early 1999 Consejo Mundial de Lucha Libre (CMLL) announced that they were planning on holding a one night, single elimination tag team tournament on a special show on March 19, 1999, dedicated to the memory of Salvador Lutteroth, the founder of CMLL. The tournament was the second year in a row that CMLL held a tournament named after Lutteroth, but the first time it was for tag teams. The tournament featured 8 teams in total, four teams of wrestles whose careers peaked in the 1980s and early 1990s and four teams who were looking to make a name for themselves at the time. The veteran teams included Kahoz and Scorpio Jr., Ringo Mendoza and Super Astro, Los Missioneros del Muerte ("The Missionaries of Death"; El Signo and Negro Navarro) and Fisman and Villano III while the younger generation was represented by the teams of Último Guerrero and Violencia, El Felino and Máscara Mágica, Olímpico and Tony Rivera and finally Mr. Niebla and Shocker.

The main event of the show was a tag teamLucha de Apuestas that came about as a result of a long running rivalry between the tecnico team of Hijo del Santo and Negro Casas facing off against the veteran rudo team of Bestia Salvaje and Scorpio Jr. Salvaje and Scorpio Jr. set out to teach Casas and Hijo del Santo a lesson in respect but ended up humiliate by them when they were defeated, leading them to attack their opponents after the match.

=== Homage to Salvador Lutteroth and El Santo ===
In September 1933 Salvador Lutteroth González founded Empresa Mexicana de Lucha Libre (EMLL), which would later be renamed Consejo Mundial de Lucha Libre. Over time Lutteroth would become responsible for building both Arena Coliseo in Mexico City and Arena Mexico, which became known as "The Cathedral of Lucha Libre". Over time EMLL became the oldest wrestling promotion in the world, with 2018 marking the 85th year of its existence. Lutteroth has often been credited with being the "father of Lucha Libre", introducing the concept of masked wrestlers to Mexico as well as the Luchas de Apuestas match. Lutteroth died on September 5, 1987. EMLL, late CMLL, remained under the ownership and control of the Lutteroth family as first Salvador's son Chavo Lutteroth and later his grandson Paco Alonso took over ownership of the company.

The life and achievements of Salvador Lutteroth is always honored at the annual Homenaje a Dos Leyenda' show and since 1999 CMLL has also honored a second person, a Leyenda of lucha libre, in some ways CMLL's version of their Hall of Fame. For several years the second Leyenda honored was the Mexican cultural icon El Santo whose popularity transcended both lucha libre and lucha films. El Santo, real name Rodolfo Guzmán Huerta (September 23, 1917 – February 5, 1984), was an active wrestler from 1934 until 1982, who also starred in over 50 lucha films between 1958 and 1982. Through his popularity and the roles he played in his films, El Santo became a Mexican folk hero and became a symbol of Mexican wrestling across the world. During his career, he mainly wrestled for Empresa Mundial de Lucha Libre in Mexico where he won the Mexican National Light Heavyweight Championship, Mexican National Middleweight Championship, Mexican National Tag Team Championship with Rayo de Jalisco, Mexican National Welterweight Championship, NWA World Middleweight Championship and the NWA World Welterweight Championship. He is said to have popularized professional wrestling in Mexico just as Rikidōzan did in Japan or like Hulk Hogan did in the United States. Guzmán's son followed him into wrestling as El Hijo del Santo, or the 'Son of Santo'. In 2018, WWE inducted him into their Hall of Fame in the Legacy category.

== Event ==
The opening match saw the tecnico team of El Pantera and Starman defeated Karloff Lagarde Jr. and Valentin Mayo two falls to one in a Best two out of three falls tag team match. In the second match Blue Panther defeated Rodolfo Ruiz, the father of Averno, then known as Rencor Latino.

=== Torneo Salvador Lutteroth ===
The Torneo Salvador Lutteroth opened up with the new generation team of Último Guerrero and Violencia defeated the veteran rudos Kahoz and Scorpio Jr. with the storyline being that Scorpio Jr. was more focused on the main event match than the tournament. In the second match the very experienced team of Ringo Mendoza and Super Astro overcame El Felino and Máscara Mágica. The third match featured Los Missioneros del Muerte, who had teamed regularly since the early 1980s, defeating the makeshift team of Olímpico and Tony Rivera. in the final first round match Mr. Niebla (winner of the first Torneo Salvador Lutteroth) and Shocker defeated the very experienced Fishman and Villano III to move into the semi-finals. Guerrero and Violencia fell to the team of Ringo Mendoza and Super Astro while Mr. Niebla and Shocker advanced to the finals over El Signo and Negro Navarro. The last match saw the veterans Ringo Mendoza and Super Astro take the match, the tournament and the trophy.

In the semi-main event Atlantis and Brazo de Plata teamed up with the 2.13 m (7 ft 0 in) tall Giant Silva to take on the four man team of Gran Markus Jr., and Los Capos (Apolo Dantés, Máscara Año 2000 and Universo 2000) in a series of handicap matches that Giant Silva participated in while working for CMLL. The sheer size of Giant Silva overpowered Los Capos as his team won two falls to one.

=== Main Event ===
The match between the teams of Hijo del Santo/Negro Casas and Bestia Salvaje/Scorpio Jr. has been cited as one of the matches that confirmed that Hijo del Santo and Negro Casas were two of the most talented wrestlers in CMLL at the time. The teams quickly split the first two falls between them, with the tecnico team taking the third and deciding fall. This forced Bestia Salvaje to be shaved bald and Scorpio Jr. removed his mask and revealed that his real name was Rafael Núñez Juan.

=== Results ===
| No. | Results | Stipulations |
|---|---|---|
| 1 | El Pantera and Starman defeated Karloff Lagarde Jr. and Valentin Mayo | Best two-out-of-three falls tag team match |
| 2 | Blue Panther defeated Rodolfo Ruiz | Best two-out-of-three falls singles match |
| 3 | Último Guerrero and Violencia defeated Kahoz and Scorpio Jr. | Torneo Salvador Lutteroth Tag Team Tournament quarterfinal |
| 4 | Ringo Mendoza and Super Astro defeated El Felino and Máscara Mágica | Torneo Salvador Lutteroth Tag Team Tournament quarterfinal |
| 5 | Los Missioneros del Muerte (El Signo and Negro Navarro) defeated Olímpico and Tony Rivera | Torneo Salvador Lutteroth Tag Team Tournament quarterfinal |
| 6 | Mr. Niebla and Shocker defeated Fisman and Villano III | Torneo Salvador Lutteroth Tag Team Tournament quarterfinal |
| 7 | Ringo Mendoza and Super Astro defeated Último Guerrero and Violencia | Torneo Salvador Lutteroth Tag Team Tournament semifinal |
| 8 | Mr. Niebla and Shocker defeated Los Missioneros del Muerte (El Signo and Negro Navarro) | Torneo Salvador Lutteroth Tag Team Tournament semifinal |
| 9 | Ringo Mendoza and Super Astro defeated Mr. Niebla and Shocker | Torneo Salvador Lutteroth Tag Team Tournament final |
| 10 | Atlantis, Brazo de Plata and Giganté Silva defeated Gran Markus Jr., and Los Capos (Apolo Dantés, Máscara Año 2000 and Universo 2000) | Best two-out-of-three falls three-on-four handicap match |
| 11 | Hijo del Santo and Negro Casas defeated Bestia Salvaje and Scorpio Jr. | Best two-out-of-three falls Lucha de Apuestas, Mask and Hair vs. Hair and Mask match |

=== Tournament bracket ===
Quarter finals
Último Guerrero and Violencia | W
Kahoz and Scorpio Jr.
Ringo Mendoza and Super Astro | W
El Felino and Máscara Mágica
El Signo and Negro Navarro | W
Olímpico and Tony Rivera
Mr. Niebla and Shocker | W
Fisman and Villano III

Semi finals
Último Guerrero and Violencia
Ringo Mendoza and Super Astro | W
El Signo and Negro Navarro
Mr. Niebla and Shocker | W

Final
Mr. Niebla and Shocker
Ringo Mendoza and Super Astro | W
