= Homenaje a Dos Leyendas =

Mexican professional wrestling supercard show series

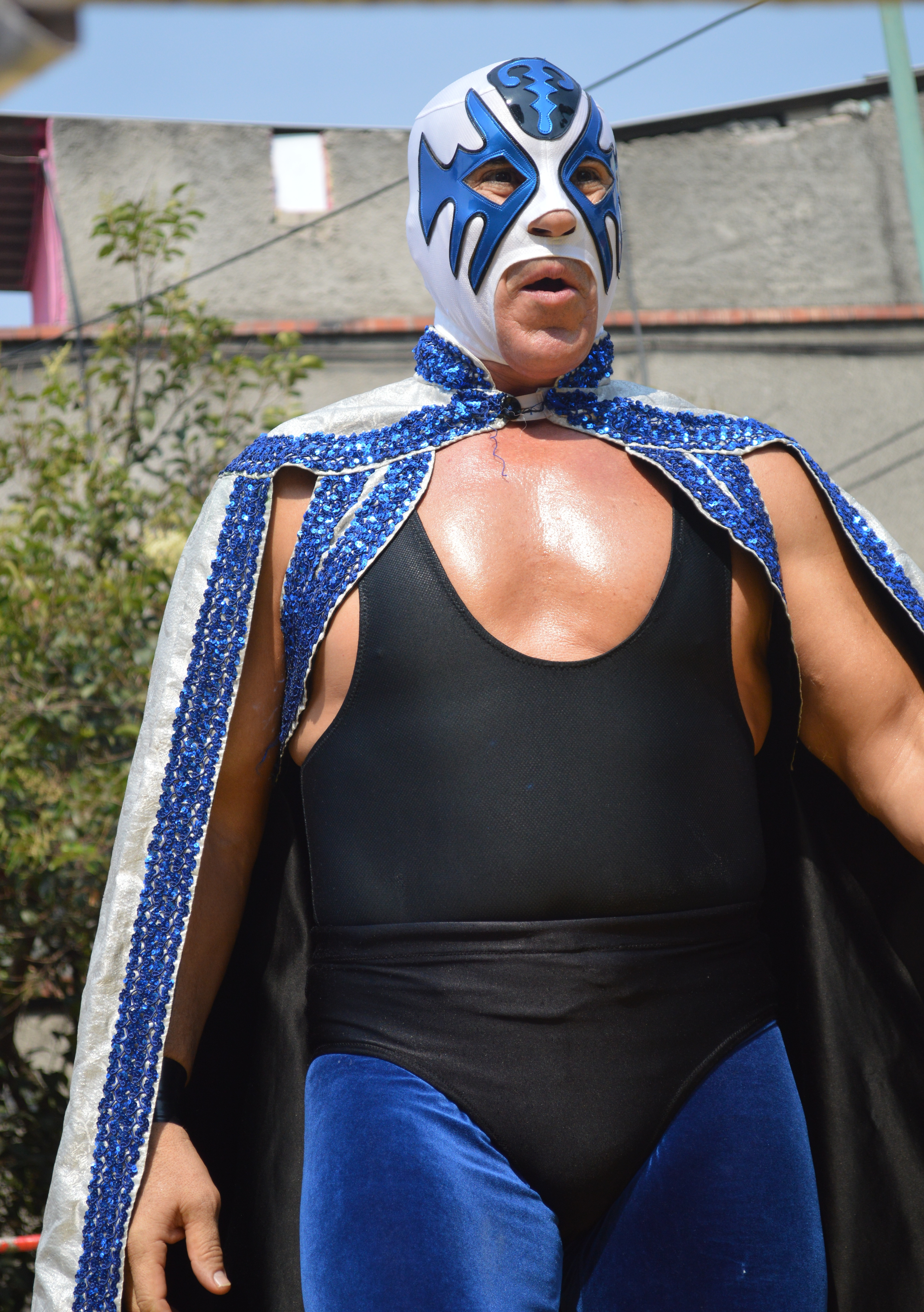
Atlantis, one of two wrestlers to have appeared on 15 out of 20 Homenaje a Dos Leyendas shows

Homenaje a Dos Leyendas (Spanish for "Homage to Two Legends") is the collective name of a series of annual lucha libre (or professional wrestling) major shows promoted by Mexican professional wrestling promotion Consejo Mundial de Lucha Libre (CMLL). The show started out as Homenaje a Salvador Lutteroth, honoring CMLL founder Salvador Lutteroth, it would later honor Lutteroth and El Santo until 2005 where the event would honor Lutteroth and a different retired or deceased luchador each year. CMLL has held a total of 29 Homenaje events, starting in 1996 and one each year since then. The shows are usually main evented by a Lucha de Apuestas or "Bet match" where competitors wager either their wrestling mask or hair on the outcome of the match.

== Event history ==
CMLL has paid homage to its founder Salvador Lutteroth since Lutteroth's death in 1987 but it was not until 1995 that they held a specific event in his honor. On March 24, 1995, during their regular Friday night CMLL Super Viernes show they held a one night Trios tournament called the Salvador Lutteroth Trios Tournament. The following year CMLL decided to hold a special major event in March to commemorate Lutteroth, creating a show called Homenaje a Salvador Lutteroth ("Homage to Salvador Lutteroth"). in 1995, 1996 and 1999 the event hosted a one-night tournament in Lutteroth's name. The Lutteroth memorial tournament concept has not been used since then. In 1999 CMLL decided to also honor Mexico's most famous wrestler El Santo at the same event, changing the name of the event to Homenaje a Dos Leyendas: El Santo y Salvador Lutteroth ("Homage to Two Legends: El Santo and Salvador Lutteroth"). After a dispute with El Santo's son El Hijo del Santo in late 2004/early 2005 CMLL decided to change the show name to simply Homenaje a Dos Leyendas and honor Lutteroth and a different "lucha libre legend" each year. The 2005 event honored Perro Aguayo, who returned to the wrestling ring for one last match on that night, teaming up with his son Perro Aguayo Jr. CMLL has on occasion promoted the March event under a different name as well as the Homenaje name, in 2000 and in 2001 they also billed their March shows as Juicio Final ("Final Justice") and in 2002 it was also billed as Apocalipsis ("Apocalypse").

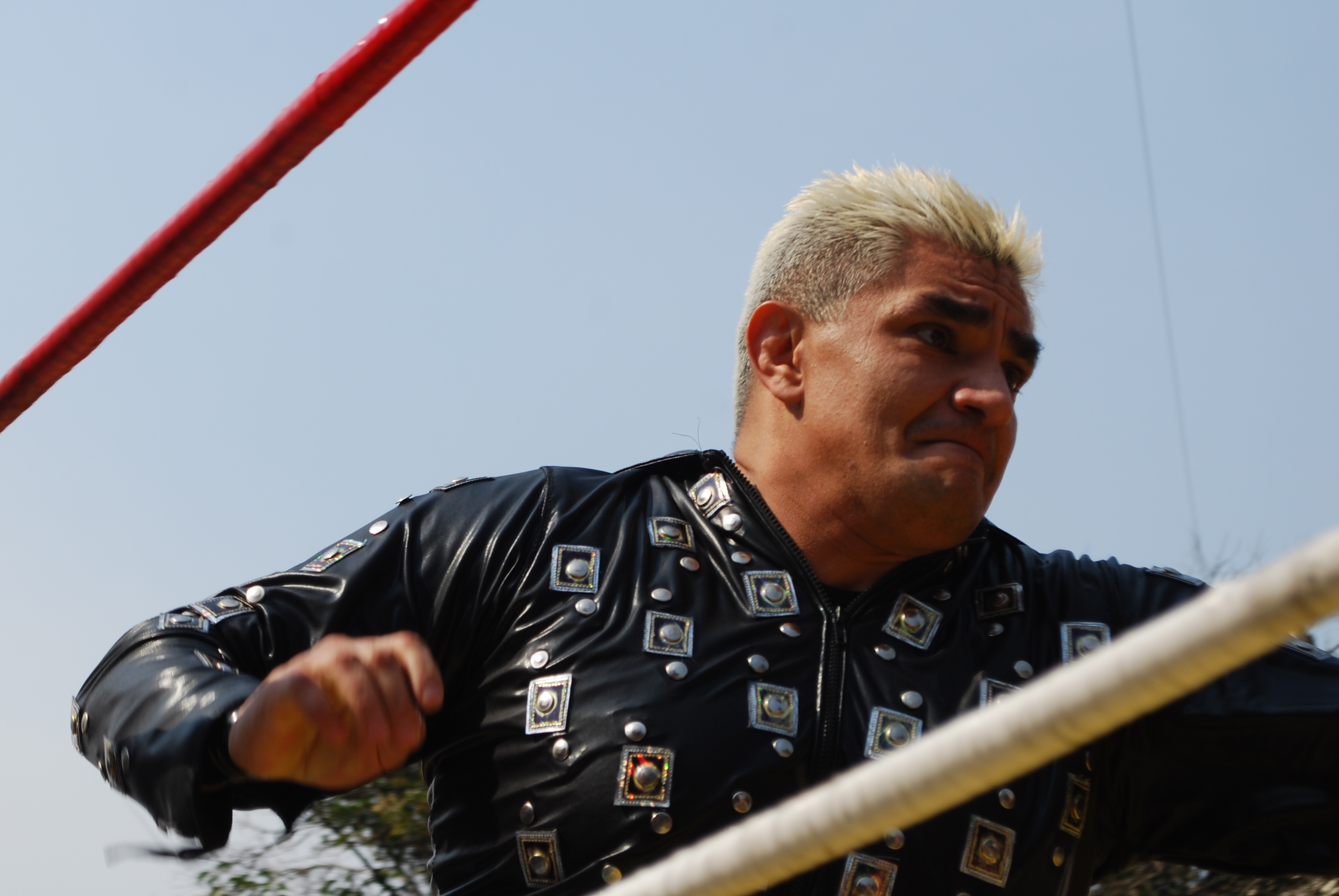
Shocker, who had his hair shaved off in the 2014 event.

As of 2015 a total of 156 wrestlers had wrestled in a total of matches 120 matches over the 20 shows, 14 female wrestlers, 17 Mini-Estrellas and 148 male wrestlers from the regular division. Atlantis and Negro Casas are the wrestlers with the most Homenaje a Dos Leyendas matches, 15 each, Marcela is the female wrestler with most matches, six, and Pierrothito is the most frequently featured Mini-Estrella with three matches in total. Several wrestlers has worked on different Dos Leyendas shows under different ring names; Ephesto / Safari, Metro / Diamante Azul, Místico / Astro Boy, Silver King / Black Tiger III, Ultramán Jr. / Starman, Tarzan Boy / Toscano and Villano V / Ray Mendoza Jr. (Note: The match statistics are supported by the sources listed in the "Dates, venues and main events table.) All of the twenty shows have featured a Lucha de Apuestas, or bet match as the main event. The match type is the most prestigious match form in lucha libre as illustrated by its main event status. In total seven wrestlers have lost their masks as a result of a Luchas de Apuesta loss; Scorpio Jr., Villano III, Villano V, Veneno, El Felino, Namajague and Kamaitachi. Twenty one times a wrestler has had their hair shaved off as a result of their Dos Leyendas matches; El Brazo, La Fiera, Bestia Salvaje, El Satánico, Perro Aguayo, Gran Markus Jr., Máscara Año 2000 (twice), Cien Caras (twice), Universo 2000 (twice), Héctor Garza, Brazo de Plata, Máximo, Negro Casas, Blue Panther, La Amapola, Shigeo Okumura, Dalys la Caribeña, Shocker, El Terrible and Rey Bucanero The Dos Leyendas show series has hosted seven championship matches, with five championship changes and two successful defenses. There have been a total of five tournament finals held at a Dos Leyendas show, including a tournament for the vacant CMLL World Trios Championship, the Lutteroth singles and Trios tournament and the finals of the 2012 Torneo Nacional de Parejas Increibles 2014 Torneo Nacional de Parejas Increibles tournaments.

== Dates, venues, and main events ==
#	Year	Date	Second legend	Main event		
#	Year	Date	Second legend	Winner(s)	Loser(s)	Match
1	1996	March 22	None	Rambo	El Brazo	Hair vs. Hair match
2	1997	March 21	None	Silver King	La Fiera	Hair vs. Hair match
3	1998	March 20	None	Emilio Charles Jr.	El Satánico	Hair vs. Hair match
4	1999	March 19	El Santo	Hijo del Santo and Negro Casas	Bestia Salvaje and Scorpio Jr.	Mask and Hair vs. Hair and Mask match
5	2000	March 17	El Santo	Atlantis	Villano III	Mask vs. Mask match
6	2001	March 30	El Santo	Universo 2000	Perro Aguayo	Mask vs. Hair match
7	2002	March 17	El Santo	Gran Markus Jr.	Veneno	Hair vs. Mask match
8	2003	March 21	El Santo	Pierroth Jr.	Gran Markus Jr.	Hair vs. Hair match
9	2004	March 19	El Santo	Perro Aguayo Jr. and El Terrible	Cien Caras and Máscara Año 2000	Hairs vs. Hairs match
10	2005	March 18	Perro Aguayo	Perro Aguayo and Perro Aguayo Jr.	Cien Caras and Máscara Año 2000	Tag team Hair vs. hair match
11	2006	March 17	El Santo	Perro Aguayo Jr.	Universo 2000	Hair vs. hair match
12	2007	March 30	Huracán Ramírez	Marco Corleone	Universo 2000	Hair vs. hair match
13	2008	March 21	Black Shadow	Perro Aguayo Jr.	Héctor Garza	Hair vs. hair match
14	2009	March 20	Cavernario Galindo	Último Guerrero	Villano V	Mask vs. mask match
15	2010	March 19	Ray Mendoza	El Felino	La Sombra	Mask vs. mask match
16	2011	March 18	Ángel Blanco	El Terrible and El Texano Jr.	Brazo de Plata and Máximo	Tag team Hair vs. hair match
17	2012	March 2	Bobby Bonales	Negro Casas	Blue Panther	Hair vs. hair match
18	2013	March 15	Rayo de Jalisco Sr.	Stuka Jr. and Rey Cometa	La Fiebre Amarilla (Okumura and Namajague)	Mask and hair vs. mask and hair match
19	2014	March 21	Cien Caras	Rush	Shocker	Hair vs. Hair match
20	2015	March 20	El Faraón	Máximo and Volador Jr.	TRT: La Máquina de la Destrucción (El Terrible and Rey Bucanero)	Hair vs. Hair match
21	2016	March 18	Lizmark	Volador Jr.	Negro Casas	Hair vs. Hair match
22	2017	March 17	Villano III	Diamante Azul	Pierroth	Mask vs. Mask match
23	2018	March 16	Mil Máscaras	El Cuatrero	Ángel de Oro	Mask vs. Mask match
24	2019	March 15	Blue Demon	Ángel de Oro and Niebla Roja	El Terrible and La Bestia del Ring	Hair vs. Hair match
25	2021	September 17	Sangre Chicana	Bárbaro Cavernario	El Felino	Hair vs. Hair match
26	2022	March 18	Ringo Mendoza	Averno and Místico	TJP and Volador Jr.	Tag team match
27	2023	March 17	Irma González	Volador Jr.	Rocky Romero	Hair vs. Hair match
28	2024	March 29	Tony Salazar	Místico, Volador Jr., Blue Panther and Último Guerrero	Blackpool Combat Club (Jon Moxley, Claudio Castagnoli and Bryan Danielson) and Matt Sydal	Eight-man tag team match
29	2025	March 21	Salvador Lutteroth Camou	Zandokan Jr.	Star Jr.	Mask vs. Mask match
30	2026	March 20	El Satánico	Hechicero	Claudio Castagnoli	CMLL World Heavyweight Championship match
