= Homenaje a Dos Leyendas (2005) =

Mexican professional wrestling supercard show

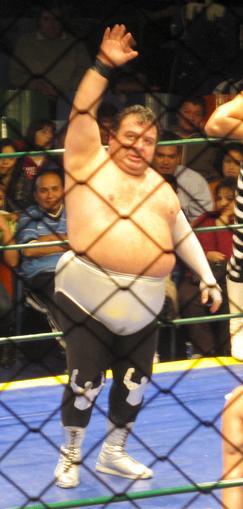
- Brazo de Plata, who teamed up with Black Warrior and L.A. Park in the second match of the night.
- Promotion: Consejo Mundial de Lucha Libre
- Date: March 13, 2005
- City: Mexico City, Mexico
- Venue: Arena México
- Attendance: 12,000
- Tagline(s): Sangre contra Sangre ("Blood versus Blood")

Pay-per-view chronology
← Previous; La Copa Junior	Next →: 49. Aniversario de Arena México

Homenaje a Dos Leyendas chronology
← Previous; 2004	Next → 2006

Homenaje a Dos Leyendas (2005) (Spanish for "Homage to Two Legends") was a professional wrestling supercard show event, scripted and produced by Consejo Mundial de Lucha Libre (CMLL; "World Wrestling Council"). The Dos Leyendas show took place on March 18, 2005 in CMLL's main venue, Arena México, Mexico City, Mexico. The event was to honor and remember CMLL founder Salvador Lutteroth, who died in March 1987. For the first time in the history of the Dos Leyendas show series, CMLL did not pay homage to El Santo but instead honored wrestling legend Perro Aguayo, who came out of retirement to compete in the main event of the show. This was the sixth March show held under the Homenaje a Dos Leyendas name, having previously been known as Homenaje a Salvador Lutteroth from 1996 to 1998.

The main event of the Homnaje a Dos Leyendas show was a tag team match between the father son team of Perro Aguayo and Perro Aguayo Jr. and the brother team of Cien Caras and Máscara Año 2000 contested under Lucha de Apuestas, hair vs. hair rules. The storyline leading into the main event played off a long running feud between Aguayo and Caras/Máscara 2000 that began in the 1980s. Caras was given the credit for retiring Perro Aguayo some time previous and had targeted Aguayo's son. After a two on one attack Perro, Sr. came to the rescue of his son, challenging Cien Casa and Máscara Año 2000 for "one last mask". The Aguayos won the tag team match and forced Caras and Año 2000 to have their heads shaved bald after the match. The show featured four additional matches all Six-man "Lucha Libre rules" tag team matches.

== Production ==
=== Background ===
Since 1996 the Mexican wrestling company Consejo Mundial de Lucha Libre (Spanish for "World Wrestling Council"; CMLL) has held a show in March each year to commemorate the passing of CMLL founder Salvador Lutteroth who died in March 1987. For the first three years the show paid homage to Lutteroth himself, from 1999 through 2004 the show paid homage to Lutteroth and El Santo, Mexico's most famous wrestler ever and from 2005 forward the show has paid homage to Lutteroth and a different leyenda ("Legend") each year, celebrating the career and accomplishments of past CMLL stars. Originally billed as Homenaje a Salvador Lutteroth, it has been held under the Homenaje a Dos Leyendas ("Homage to two legends") since 1999 and is the only show outside of CMLL's Anniversary shows that CMLL has presented every year since its inception. All Homenaje a Dos Leyendas shows have been held in Arena México in Mexico City, Mexico, which is CMLL's main venue, its "home". Traditionally CMLL holds their major events on Friday Nights, which means the Homenaje a Dos Leyendas shows replace their regularly scheduled Super Viernes show. The 2005 show was the tenth overall Homenaje a Dos Leyendas show.

=== Storylines ===
The Homenaje a Dos Leyendas show featured five professional wrestling matches with different wrestlers involved in pre-existing scripted feuds, plots and storylines. Wrestlers were portrayed as either heels (referred to as rudos in Mexico, those that portray the "bad guys") or faces (técnicos in Mexico, the "good guy" characters) as they followed a series of tension-building events, which culminated in a wrestling match or series of matches.

=== Homage to Salvador Lutteroth and Perro Aguayo ===
In September 1933 Salvador Lutteroth González founded Empresa Mexicana de Lucha Libre (EMLL), which would later be renamed Consejo Mundial de Lucha Libre. Over time Lutteroth would become responsible for building both Arena Coliseo in Mexico City and Arena Mexico, which became known as "The Cathedral of Lucha Libre". Over time EMLL became the oldest wrestling promotion in the world, with 2018 marking the 85th year of its existence. Lutteroth has often been credited with being the "father of Lucha Libre", introducing the concept of masked wrestlers to Mexico as well as the Luchas de Apuestas match. Lutteroth died on September 5, 1987. EMLL, late CMLL, remained under the ownership and control of the Lutteroth family as first Salvador's son Chavo Lutteroth and later his grandson Paco Alonso took over ownership of the company.

The life and achievements of Salvador Lutteroth is always honored at the annual Homenaje a Dos Leyenda' show and since 1999 CMLL has also honored a second person, a Leyenda of lucha libre, in some ways CMLL's version of their Hall of Fame. For the 2005 show CMLL commemorated the life and career of Pedro Aguayo Damián (January 18, 1946—July 3, 2019), known under the ring name Perro Aguayo (Spanish for "Dog Aguayo"). Aguayo was famous for his violent wrestling style, often involving breaking the rules, the use of various weapons and often saw Aguayo or his opponent bleed during the match. He made his debut in 1968 and was active until 2001, coming out of retirement specifically for the Homenaje a Dos Leyendas show. His son, Perro Aguayo Jr., would later follow in his footsteps, becoming a luchador. Aguayo was part of the group of wrestlers who helped get Asistencia Asesoría y Administración (AAA) off the ground, especially his storyline feud with Máscara Año 2000 and Cien Caras. He would win Máscara Año 2000's mask as part of Triplemanía I. during his 33-year career Aguayo won a plethora of championships including the NWA World Middleweight Championship, the AAA Campeón de Campeones Championship, the IWC World Heavyweight Championship, the Mexican National Heavyweight Championship, the Mexican National Tag Team Championship with Perro Jr. twice, the Mexican National Middleweight Championship the UWA World Heavyweight Championship, the UWA World Lightweight Championship, the UWA World Light Heavyweight Championship the UWA World Junior Light Heavyweight Championship, the UWA World Tag Team Championship, the WWF Light Heavyweight Championship seven times, and the WWA World Heavyweight Championship 3 times

== Results ==
No.	Results	Stipulations
1	Pandilla Guerrera (Doctor X, Nitro and Sangre Azteca) defeated El Felino, Safari and Volador Jr.	Best two-out-of-three falls six-man "Lucha Libre rules" tag team match
2	Black Warrior, Brazo de Plata and L.A. Park defeated Apolo Dantés, El Satánico and Universo 2000	Best two-out-of-three falls six-man "Lucha Libre rules" tag team match
3	Averno, Mephisto and Rey Bucanero defeated Atlantis, Blue Panther and Negro Casas	Best two-out-of-three falls six-man "Lucha Libre rules" tag team match
4	Héctor Garza and Los Guerreros del Infierno (Tarzan Boy and Último Guerrero) defeated Dr. Wagner Jr., Místico and Shocker	Best two-out-of-three falls six-man "Lucha Libre rules" tag team match
5	Perro Aguayo and Perro Aguayo Jr. defeated Los Hermanos Dinamita (Cien Caras and Máscara Año 2000)	Best two-out-of-three falls Tag team Lucha de Apuestas, hair vs. hair match.
