= Homenaje a Dos Leyendas (2008) =

Mexican professional wrestling supercard show

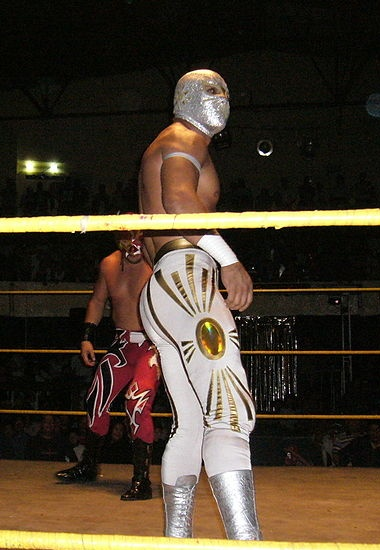
- Místico, participated in the fifth match of the night.
- Promotion: Consejo Mundial de Lucha Libre
- Date: March 21, 2008
- City: Mexico City, Mexico
- Venue: Arena México
- Attendance: 15,500

Event chronology
← Previous; Pequeños Reyes del Aire	Next →: 52. Aniversario de Arena México

Homenaje a Dos Leyendas chronology
← Previous; 2007	Next → 2009

Homenaje a Dos Leyendas (2008) (Spanish for "Homage to Two Legends") was a professional wrestling pay-per-view (PPV) show event, scripted and produced by Consejo Mundial de Lucha Libre (CMLL; "World Wrestling Council"). The Dos Leyendas show took place on March 21, 2008 in CMLL's main venue, Arena México, Mexico City, Mexico. The event was to honor and remember CMLL founder Salvador Lutteroth, who died in March 1987. Starting in 1999 CMLL honored not just their founder during the show, but also a second lucha libre legend, making it their version of a Hall of Fame event. For the 2008 show CMLL commemorated the life and career of wrestler Black Shadow. This was the tenth March show held under the Homenaje a Dos Leyendas name, having previously been known as Homenaje a Salvador Lutteroth from 1996 to 1998.

The main event of the Dos Leyendas show was fought under Lucha de Apuestas ("bet match") rules where the loser would have his head shaved bald. The match saw Perro Aguayo Jr. defeat Héctor Garza. After his loss, Garza stood in the center of the ring to have all his hair cut off. The show featured five further matches, all Six-man "Lucha Libre rules" tag team match, one being an all-female match and one featuring CMLL's Mini-Estrella division.

== Production ==
=== Background ===
Since 1996 the Mexican wrestling company Consejo Mundial de Lucha Libre (Spanish for "World Wrestling Council"; CMLL) has held a show in March each year to commemorate the passing of CMLL founder Salvador Lutteroth who died in March 1987. For the first three years the show paid homage to Lutteroth himself, from 1999 through 2004 the show paid homage to Lutteroth and El Santo, Mexico's most famous wrestler ever and from 2005 forward the show has paid homage to Lutteroth and a different leyenda ("Legend") each year, celebrating the career and accomplishments of past CMLL stars. Originally billed as Homenaje a Salvador Lutteroth, it has been held under the Homenaje a Dos Leyendas ("Homage to two legends") since 1999 and is the only show outside of CMLL's Anniversary shows that CMLL has presented every year since its inception. All Homenaje a Dos Leyendas shows have been held in Arena México in Mexico City, Mexico, which is CMLL's main venue, its "home". Traditionally CMLL holds their major events on Friday Nights, which means the Homenaje a Dos Leyendas shows replace their regularly scheduled Super Viernes show. The 2008 show was the 13th overall Homenaje a Dos Leyendas show.

=== Storylines ===
The Homenaje a Dos Leyendas show featured six professional wrestling matches with different wrestlers involved in pre-existing scripted feuds, plots and storylines. Wrestlers were portrayed as either heels (referred to as rudos in Mexico, those that portray the "bad guys") or faces (técnicos in Mexico, the "good guy" characters) as they followed a series of tension-building events, which culminated in a wrestling match or series of matches.

=== Homage to Salvador Lutteroth and Black Shadow ===
In September 1933 Salvador Lutteroth González founded Empresa Mexicana de Lucha Libre (EMLL), which would later be renamed Consejo Mundial de Lucha Libre. Over time Lutteroth would become responsible for building both Arena Coliseo in Mexico City and Arena Mexico, which became known as "The Cathedral of Lucha Libre". Over time EMLL became the oldest wrestling promotion in the world, with 2018 marking the 85th year of its existence. Lutteroth has often been credited with being the "father of Lucha Libre", introducing the concept of masked wrestlers to Mexico as well as the Luchas de Apuestas match. Lutteroth died on September 5, 1987. EMLL, late CMLL, remained under the ownership and control of the Lutteroth family as first Salvador's son Chavo Lutteroth and later his grandson Paco Alonso took over ownership of the company.

The life and achievements of Salvador Lutteroth is always honored at the annual Homenaje a Dos Leyenda' show and since 1999 CMLL has also honored a second person, a Leyenda of lucha libre, in some ways CMLL's version of their Hall of Fame. For the 2008 show CMLL commemorated the life and career of wrestler and lucha film star Alejandro Cruz Ortiz, generally known under the ring name Black Shadow. Cruz's career started in 1942 and he did not fully retire until 1981. As Black Shadow, Cruz teamed up with Blue Demon, to form a very successfully and popular team known as Los Hermanos Shadow ("The Shadow Brothers"), although they were not related. The duo won the Mexican National Tag Team Championship once, but are best known for their long running feud with El Santo. The Lucha de Apuestas, or bet match, between El Santo and Black Shadow in 1952 has been named one of the most important Lucha de Apuestas matches in Mexican history. He also started in several films, often alongside Blue Demon.

== Results ==
No.	Results	Stipulations	Times
1	Dark Angel, Marcela and Sahori defeated Hiroka, Mima Shimoda and Princesa Sujei	Best two-out-of-three falls six-woman "Lucha Libre rules" tag team match	11:42
2	Bam Bam, Mascarita Dorada and Tzuki defeated Pequeño Damián 666, Fire and Pierrothito	Best two-out-of-three falls six-man "Lucha Libre rules" tag team match	11:41
3	Los Guerreros del Infierno (Olímpico, Rey Bucanero and Sangre Azteca) defeated Grey Shadow, La Sombra and El Sagrado	Best two-out-of-three falls six-man "Lucha Libre rules" tag team match	09:53
4	Los Perros del Mal (Mr. Águila, El Terrible and Villano V) defeated Blue Panther, Negro Casas and Volador Jr.	Best two-out-of-three falls six-man "Lucha Libre rules" tag team match	08:53
5	Místico and Los Guerreros de la Atlantida (Atlantis and Último Guerrero) defeated Averno, Mephisto and L.A. Park	Best two-out-of-three falls six-man "Lucha Libre rules" tag team match	18:04
6	Perro Aguayo Jr. defeated Héctor Garza	Best two-out-of-three falls, Lucha de Apuestas, hair vs. hair match	15:03
