= Homenaje a Dos Leyendas: El Santo y Salvador Lutteroth (2004) =

Mexican professional wrestling supercard show

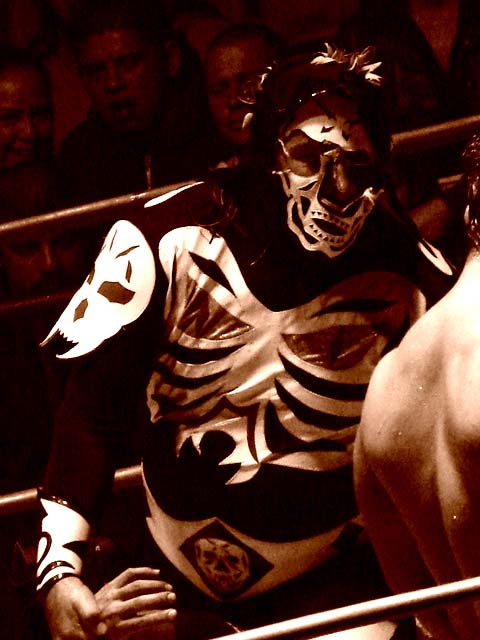
- L.A. Park teamed with Shocker to defend the CMLL World Tag Team Championship on the show.
- Promotion: Consejo Mundial de Lucha Libre
- Date: March 19, 2004
- City: Mexico City, Mexico
- Venue: Arena México

Event chronology
← Previous; Sin Piedad	Next →: 48. Aniversario de Arena México

Homenaje a Dos Leyendas chronology
← Previous; 2003	Next → 2005

Homenaje a Dos Leyendas: El Santo y Salvador Lutteroth (2004) (Spanish for "Homage to Two Legends: El Santo and Salvador Lutteroth") was a professional wrestling supercard show event, scripted and produced by Consejo Mundial de Lucha Libre (CMLL; "World Wrestling Council"). The Dos Leyendas show took place on March 19, 2004 in CMLL's main venue, Arena México, Mexico City, Mexico. The event was to honor and remember CMLL founder Salvador Lutteroth, who died in March 1987. This was fifth March show held under the Homenaje a Dos Leyendas name, having previously been known as Homenaje a Salvador Lutteroth. Starting in 1999 CMLL honored not just their founder, but also El Santo, the most famous Mexican professional wrestler ever. The name of the annual March event would later be shortened to just Homenaje a Dos Leyendas after CMLL had a falling out with El Santo's son El Hijo del Santo, with the event honoring a different wrestler along with Lutteroth.

The main event was Lucha de Apuestas ("bet match") tag team match between Los Hermanos Dinamita (Cien Caras and Máscara Año 2000) and the team of Perro Aguayo Jr. and El Terrible. The match saw Aguayo Jr. and El Terrible win, forcing Cien Caras and Máscara Año 2000 to have their heads shaved bald per lucha libre traditions. In the semi-main event Los Guerreros del Infierno (Rey Bucanero and Último Guerrero) defeated L.A. Park and Shocker to win the CMLL World Tag Team Championship. The card was rounded out with three Six-man "Lucha Libre rules" tag team match and a "lightning match", a match with one fall and a 10-minute time limit.

== Production ==
=== Background ===
Since 1996 the Mexican wrestling company Consejo Mundial de Lucha Libre (Spanish for "World Wrestling Council"; CMLL) has held a show in March each year to commemorate the passing of CMLL founder Salvador Lutteroth who died in March 1987. For the first three years the show paid homage to Lutteroth himself, from 1999 through 2004 the show paid homage to Lutteroth and El Santo, Mexico's most famous wrestler ever and from 2005 forward the show has paid homage to Lutteroth and a different leyenda ("Legend") each year, celebrating the career and accomplishments of past CMLL stars. Originally billed as Homenaje a Salvador Lutteroth, it has been held under the Homenaje a Dos Leyendas ("Homage to two legends") since 1999 and is the only show outside of CMLL's Anniversary shows that CMLL has presented every year since its inception. All Homenaje a Dos Leyendas shows have been held in Arena México in Mexico City, Mexico, which is CMLL's main venue, its "home". Traditionally CMLL holds their major events on Friday Nights, which means the Homenaje a Dos Leyendas shows replace their regularly scheduled Super Viernes show. The 2004 show was the ninth overall Homenaje a Dos Leyendas show and the last dedicated specifically to El Santo.

=== Storylines ===
The Homenaje a Dos Leyendas show featured six professional wrestling matches with different wrestlers involved in pre-existing scripted feuds, plots and storylines. Wrestlers were portrayed as either heels (referred to as rudos in Mexico, those that portray the "bad guys") or faces (técnicos in Mexico, the "good guy" characters) as they followed a series of tension-building events, which culminated in a wrestling match or series of matches.

The selling point of the 2004 Homenaje a Dos Leyendas show was the storyline feud between the tecnico team of Perro Aguayo Jr. and El Terrible and the rudo brothers Cien Caras ("100 Faces") and Máscara Año 2000 ("Mask of the year 2000"), also known as Los Hermanos Dinamita ("The Dynamite Brothers"). Los Hermanos Dinamita were veteran wrestlers, having been active for 30 and 25 years respectively at this point in time. Cien Caras was semi-retired at the time, originally supporting his brother but was physically drawn into the storyline as it developed. The foundation of the storyline lay in the fact that both Cien Caras and Máscara Año 2000 had very intense rivalries with Perro Aguay Jr.'s father Perro Aguayo in the 1980s and they transferred that hatred to Aguayo Jr. After a while Aguayo Jr. got back up in the form of El Terrible, a relatively new name in CMLL, having won the 2003 Guapos University "Reality Show" competition. El Terrible came to Aguayo Jr.'s rescue after an attack by Los Hermanos Dinamita and thus became a target as well. The storyline reached its planned peak at the Homenaje a Dos Leyendas show when the two teams met in the ultimate match according to Lucha Libre traditions, a Lucha de Apuestas or a "Bet match" where the losing team would both be forced to have all their hair shaved off after the match.

The semi-main event of the show was a match for the CMLL World Tag Team Championship and a rematch from January 23, 2004, when the tecnico team of L.A. Park and Shocker won the championship from Los Guerreros del Infierno ("The Infernal Warriors") consisting of Rey Bucanero and Último Guerrero. The match was the first title defense of the new champions, 5 days after they won the titles, and also one of the few times they two actually teamed up together as they had not formed a regular tag team prior to winning the titles.

=== Homage to Salvador Lutteroth and El Santo ===
In September 1933 Salvador Lutteroth González founded Empresa Mexicana de Lucha Libre (EMLL), which would later be renamed Consejo Mundial de Lucha Libre. Over time Lutteroth would become responsible for building both Arena Coliseo in Mexico City and Arena Mexico, which became known as "The Cathedral of Lucha Libre". Over time EMLL became the oldest wrestling promotion in the world, with 2018 marking the 85th year of its existence. Lutteroth has often been credited with being the "father of Lucha Libre", introducing the concept of masked wrestlers to Mexico as well as the Luchas de Apuestas match. Lutteroth died on September 5, 1987. EMLL, late CMLL, remained under the ownership and control of the Lutteroth family as first Salvador's son Chavo Lutteroth and later his grandson Paco Alonso took over ownership of the company.

The life and achievements of Salvador Lutteroth is always honored at the annual Homenaje a Dos Leyenda' show and since 1999 CMLL has also honored a second person, a Leyenda of lucha libre, in some ways CMLL's version of their Hall of Fame. For several years the second Leyenda honored was the Mexican cultural icon El Santo whose popularity transcended both lucha libre and lucha films. El Santo, real name Rodolfo Guzmán Huerta (September 23, 1917 – February 5, 1984), was an active wrestler from 1934 until 1982, who also starred in over 50 lucha films between 1958 and 1982. Through his popularity and the roles he played in his films, El Santo became a Mexican folk hero and became a symbol of Mexican wrestling across the world. During his career, he mainly wrestled for Empresa Mundial de Lucha Libre in Mexico where he won the Mexican National Light Heavyweight Championship, Mexican National Middleweight Championship, Mexican National Tag Team Championship with Rayo de Jalisco, Mexican National Welterweight Championship, NWA World Middleweight Championship and the NWA World Welterweight Championship. He is said to have popularized professional wrestling in Mexico just as Rikidōzan did in Japan or like Hulk Hogan did in the United States. Guzmán's son followed him into wrestling as El Hijo del Santo, or the 'Son of Santo'. In 2018, WWE inducted him into their Hall of Fame in the Legacy category.

== Aftermath ==
The storyline between Perro Aguayo Jr. and Los Hermanos Dinamita did not end with the Luchas de Apuestas match, in fact they continued a prolonged storyline that stretched into the following year, drawing in Perro Aguayo, Sr. in the process. The Aguayos defeated Los Hermanos Dinamita in the main event of the 2005 Homenaje a Dos Leyendas event, with Cien Caras and Máscara Año 2000 once again having their hair shaved off as a result of the loss. The defeated Tag Team Champions Shocker and L.A. Park did not team up on a regular basis after their loss, while Los Guerreros del Infierno would hold the title until July 25, 2004 (128 days) before losing them to Atlantis and Blue Panther.

== Results ==
No.	Results	Stipulations
1	La Alianza (Hooligan, Ramstein and Sangre Azteca) defeated Astro Boy, Neutron and Zetta	Best two-out-of-three falls six-man "Lucha Libre rules" tag team match
2	Tigre Blanco defeated Nosawa	Lightning match (One fall, 10 minute time limit)
3	Brazo de Plata, Negro Casas and El Sagrado defeated Los Infernales (Averno and Mephisto) and Fuerza Guerrera	Best two-out-of-three falls six-man "Lucha Libre rules" tag team match
4	El Felino, Safari and Volador Jr. (c) defeated Olímpico, Super Crazy and Zumbido	Best two-out-of-three falls six-man tag team match for the Mexican National Trios Championship
5	Los Guerreros del Infierno (Rey Bucanero and Último Guerrero) defeated L.A. Park and Shocker (c)	Best two-out-of-three falls tag team match for the CMLL World Tag Team Championship
6	Perro Aguayo Jr. and El Terrible defeated Los Hermanos Dinamita (Cien Caras and Máscara Año 2000)	Best two-out-of-three falls Lucha de Apuestas, Hairs vs. Hairs match
(c) / – the champion(s) heading into the match
