= Homenaje a Dos Leyendas: El Santo y Salvador Lutteroth (2003) =

Mexican professional wrestling supercard show

- Dr. Wagner Jr., teamed with his brother Black Tiger (III) and Universo 2000 for the show.
- Promotion: Consejo Mundial de Lucha Libre
- Date: March 21, 2003
- City: Mexico City, Mexico
- Venue: Arena México

Event chronology
← Previous; Torneo Gran Alternativa	Next →: 47. Aniversario de Arena México

Homenaje a Dos Leyendas chronology
← Previous; 2002	Next → 2004

Homenaje a Dos Leyendas: El Santo y Salvador Lutteroth (2003) (Spanish for "Homage to Two Legends: El Santo and Salvador Lutteroth") was a professional wrestling supercard show event, scripted and produced by Consejo Mundial de Lucha Libre (CMLL; "World Wrestling Council"). The Dos Leyendas show took place on March 21, 2003 in CMLL's main venue, Arena México, Mexico City, Mexico. The event was to honor and remember CMLL founder Salvador Lutteroth, who died in March 1987. This was fifth March show held under the Homenaje a Dos Leyendas name, having previously been known as Homenaje a Salvador Lutteroth. Starting in 1999 CMLL honored not just their founder, but also El Santo, the most famous Mexican professional wrestler ever. The name of the annual March event would later be shortened to just Homenaje a Dos Leyendas after CMLL had a falling out with El Santo's son El Hijo del Santo, with the event honoring a different wrestler along with Lutteroth.

In the main event of the show Pierroth Jr. defeated Gran Markus Jr. in a best two-out-of-three falls Lucha de Apuestas match. As a result of his loss, Gran Markus Jr. was shaved bald in the middle of the ring per lucha libre traditions. On the under card Black Tiger, Dr. Wagner Jr. and Universo 2000 defeated Atlantis, Black Warrior and Mr. Niebla to win the CMLL World Trios Championship. The card featured four further matches, three Six-man "Lucha Libre rules" tag team match, and a regular Tag team match.

== Production ==
=== Background ===
Since 1996 the Mexican wrestling company Consejo Mundial de Lucha Libre (Spanish for "World Wrestling Council"; CMLL) has held a show in March each year to commemorate the passing of CMLL founder Salvador Lutteroth who died in March 1987. For the first three years the show paid homage to Lutteroth himself, from 1999 through 2004 the show paid homage to Lutteroth and El Santo, Mexico's most famous wrestler ever and from 2005 forward the show has paid homage to Lutteroth and a different leyenda ("Legend") each year, celebrating the career and accomplishments of past CMLL stars. Originally billed as Homenaje a Salvador Lutteroth, it has been held under the Homenaje a Dos Leyendas ("Homage to two legends") since 1999 and is the only show outside of CMLL's Anniversary shows that CMLL has presented every year since its inception. All Homenaje a Dos Leyendas shows have been held in Arena México in Mexico City, Mexico, which is CMLL's main venue, its "home". Traditionally CMLL holds their major events on Friday Nights, which means the Homenaje a Dos Leyendas shows replace their regularly scheduled Super Viernes show. The 2003 show was the eight overall Homenaje a Dos Leyendas show.

=== Storylines ===
The Homenaje a Dos Leyendas show featured six professional wrestling matches with different wrestlers involved in pre-existing scripted feuds, plots and storylines. Wrestlers were portrayed as either heels (referred to as rudos in Mexico, those that portray the "bad guys") or faces (técnicos in Mexico, the "good guy" characters) as they followed a series of tension-building events, which culminated in a wrestling match or series of matches.

The main event storyline was the conclusion of a long running storyline stretching back over a year to the months before the 2002 Homenaje a Dos Leyendas event when Gran Markus Jr. decided to turn on Pierroth Jr. and leave Los Boricuas, the group that Pierroth led. The previous year Gran Markus Jr. had unmasked Boriqua member Veneno in the main event of the Dos Leyendas show. In the year that followed Gran Markus Jr., aided by various CMLL tecnicos fought against the group in various matches and team combinations. The semi-main event of the show was a Six-man "Lucha Libre rules" tag team match, for the CMLL World Trios Championship as the reigning champions Atlantis, Black Warrior and Mr. Niebla put their titles on the line against the challengers Universo 2000, teaming up with the brother team of Dr. Wagner Jr. and Black Tiger (the third incarnation of that wrestling character). Black Warrior and Dr. Wagner Jr. had previously held the CMLL World Trios championship (with Blue Panther) but had to vacate the titles when the team broke up as Dr. Wagner Jr. turned on the group.

=== Homage to Salvador Lutteroth and El Santo ===
In September 1933 Salvador Lutteroth González founded Empresa Mexicana de Lucha Libre (EMLL), which would later be renamed Consejo Mundial de Lucha Libre. Over time Lutteroth would become responsible for building both Arena Coliseo in Mexico City and Arena Mexico, which became known as "The Cathedral of Lucha Libre". Over time EMLL became the oldest wrestling promotion in the world, with 2018 marking the 85th year of its existence. Lutteroth has often been credited with being the "father of Lucha Libre", introducing the concept of masked wrestlers to Mexico as well as the Luchas de Apuestas match. Lutteroth died on September 5, 1987. EMLL, late CMLL, remained under the ownership and control of the Lutteroth family as first Salvador's son Chavo Lutteroth and later his grandson Paco Alonso took over ownership of the company.

The life and achievements of Salvador Lutteroth is always honored at the annual Homenaje a Dos Leyenda' show and since 1999 CMLL has also honored a second person, a Leyenda of lucha libre, in some ways CMLL's version of their Hall of Fame. For several years the second Leyenda honored was the Mexican cultural icon El Santo whose popularity transcended both lucha libre and lucha films. El Santo, real name Rodolfo Guzmán Huerta (September 23, 1917 – February 5, 1984), was an active wrestler from 1934 until 1982, who also starred in over 50 lucha films between 1958 and 1982. Through his popularity and the roles he played in his films, El Santo became a Mexican folk hero and became a symbol of Mexican wrestling across the world. During his career, he mainly wrestled for Empresa Mundial de Lucha Libre in Mexico where he won the Mexican National Light Heavyweight Championship, Mexican National Middleweight Championship, Mexican National Tag Team Championship with Rayo de Jalisco, Mexican National Welterweight Championship, NWA World Middleweight Championship and the NWA World Welterweight Championship. He is said to have popularized professional wrestling in Mexico just as Rikidōzan did in Japan or like Hulk Hogan did in the United States. Guzmán's son followed him into wrestling as El Hijo del Santo, or the 'Son of Santo'. In 2018, WWE inducted him into their Hall of Fame in the Legacy category.

== Aftermath ==
The disintegration of Los Boriquas would continue in the months following Dos Leyendas, leading to Pierroth facing several former members in Lucha de Apuestas matches, including Pierroth defeating Violencia on the undercard of the CMLL 70th Anniversary Show. Black Tiger, Dr. Wagner, Jr and Universo 2000 would hold the CMLL Trios Championship until July 9, 2004, where they would lose to Black Warrior, El Canek and Rayo de Jalisco Jr., ending their run with the titles after 476 days.

== Results ==
No.	Results	Stipulations
1	Alan and Chris Stone defeated Sangre Azteca and Valentin Mayo	Best two-out-of-three falls tag team match
2	Safari, Tigre Blanco and Virus defeated Arkangel de la Muerte and Doctor X, Nitro	Best two-out-of-three falls six-man "Lucha Libre rules" tag team match
3	Bestia Salvaje, Juventud Guerrera and Scorpio Jr. defeated El Felino, Villano III and Villano IV	Best two-out-of-three falls six-man "Lucha Libre rules" tag team match
4	Lizmark Jr., Negro Casas and Vampiro defeated Apolo Dantés and Los Guapos (Máscara Mágica and Shocker)	Best two-out-of-three falls six-man "Lucha Libre rules" tag team match
5	Black Tiger, Dr. Wagner Jr. and Universo 2000 defeated Atlantis, Black Warrior and Mr. Niebla (c)	Best two-out-of-three falls tag team match for the CMLL World Trios Championship
6	Pierroth Jr. defeated Gran Markus Jr.	Lucha de Apuestas, Hair vs. Hair match
(c) / – the champion(s) heading into the match
