= Los Boricuas (CMLL) =

Professional wrestling stable

Stable
- Members: Comandante Pierroth; Misterioso, Jr. Sagrado; Pierrothito; Pequeño Violencia
- Name(s): Los Boricuas; Comando Caribeño
- Billed from: Puerto Rico
- Former members: Los Boricuas; Pierroth (Leader); El Boricua; Bulldog; Gran Markus Jr. El Hijo del Pierroth; The Killer; Mastin; La Nazi/La Comandante; Nitro; Pierrothito; Poder Boricua; Rico Suave; Veneno; Violencia; Zeuxis
- Debut: 2000 (Boricuas); 2013 (Comando Caribeño)
- Disbanded: 2003 (Boricuas)

Los Boricuas (Spanish for the Puerto Ricans) was a Mexican professional wrestling stable or group in Consejo Mundial de Lucha Libre (CMLL), one of Mexico's largest and the world's oldest professional wrestling promotions. The concept of the group was that a union of people born in Puerto Rico or in storyline terms "emigrated" to Puerto Rico, denouncing their Mexican heritage and embracing the Puerto Rican culture. The group was founded and led by Pierroth in 2000 and was together until the end of 2003 where it disbanded. In 2013 CMLL brought the concept back when they announced that a new Comandante Pierroth was putting together a new group of Boricuas, known as Comando Caribeño ("The Caribbean Commando"). The original team name referred to the Puerto Rican people, even though most of the wrestlers were not actually from Puerto Rico.

== Los Boricuas (2000–2003) ==
In 1999 Pierroth Jr. returned to the Mexico City-based Consejo Mundial de Lucha Libre (CMLL) promotion after an extended stay in Puerto Rico. Upon his return Pierroth Jr. declared that he was a Boricua, or Puerto Rican, declaring the superiority of the Puerto Rican people. He began teaming up with Gran Markus Jr. who also adopted the "Boricua" loyalty. Within weeks the duo became known officially as Los Boricuas and started to grow from a two-man team to a multi-man stable when they added the masked La Boricua and later on Veneno. At this point Pierroth Jr. took the nickname "El Comandate", acting like a dictator over the group, adding the female La Nazi as his personal body guard. In mid-2000 they added Violencia to the group, replacing El Boricua. At that point in time Los Boricuas began a storyline feud with Los Capos (Cien Caras, Máscara Año 2000, Universo 2000 and Apolo Dantés), by June 2001 the group added Poder Boricua ("Puerto Rican Power") to the group, as well as veteran wrestler the Killer and Mini-Estrella Pequeno Violencia to the group to strengthen their numbers.

At the CMLL 68th Anniversary Show the team of Gran Markus, Jr., Poder Boricua and Violencia unsuccessfully challenged for the Mexican National Trios Championship, losing to champions Mr. Niebla, Olímpico and Safari In the months following the 68th Anniversary show Gran Markus, Jr. left the group with the storyline being that he was tired of being under Pierroth's command. In leaving the group Gran Markus began working opposite Los Boricuas as the storyline developed. To fill the gap Pierroth introduced Nitro to the group, a CMLL wrestler who had previous worked as Filoso. On March 27, 2002, as part of CMLL's Homenaje a Dos Leyendas: El Santo y Salvador Lutteroth show Gran Markus Jr. defeated Veneno in a Lucha de Apuesta, or bet match, forcing Veneno to unmask as a result. In subsequent months Poder Boricua left the group as well, changing his name to "Poder Mexican" ("Mexican Power") and began working opposite the rest of Los Boricuas. On July 14, 2002 Poder Mexica and Mr. Mexico lost a Luchas de Apuestas match to Veneno and Violencia and as a result Poder Mexica was forced to unmask. The storyline feud between Los Boricuas and those that defected from the faction continued as Gran Markus Jr. won a Luchas de Apuestas match in November, 2002 forcing Veneno to have all his hair shaved off. The culmination of the storyline between Los Boricuas and the defectors came on March 21, 2003 as Pierroth Jr. and Gran Markus Jr. faced off in main event of that year's Homenaje a Dos Leyendas show. In the end Pierroth defeated Gran Markus and as a result Gran Markus Jr. was shaved bald afterwards. The last remaining storyline for Los Boricuas saw Violencia leave the group, which at the time was basically himself and Pierroth and had Pierroth unmask Violencia at the CMLL 70th Anniversary Show. In subsequent months Pierroth began teaming on a regular basis with Vampiro and Tarzan Boy, ending the Los Boricuas faction in CMLL.

== Comando Caribeño (2013–present) ==
On May 9, 2013 CMLL introduced a new Comandante Pierroth, a character based on the original Pierroth around the time he formed Los Boricuas in 2000. The new Comandante Pierroth was announced as the leader of a new version of the Los Boricuas faction, called Comando Caribeño ("The Caribbean Commando"). The team included members of the original Pierroth's Los Boriquas; Pequeño Violencia, Pierrothito, and La Comandante (formerly "La Nazi"), and added Zeuxis to the group as well. With no other members competing in the regular men's division the group had very little presence during CMLL's shows, occasionally Pierrothito and Pequeño Violencia competed wearing the red, white and blue Puerto Rican inspired wrestling gear, but La Comandante and Zeuxis did not team up on a regular basis. In late 2014 Comandante Pierroth began teaming with Misterioso Jr. and Sagrado, although they were not officially members of Comando Caribeño at that time. In early 2015 it was officially acknowledged as working under the name La Comando Caribeno with both Misterioso, Jr. and Sagrada adopting the imagery of the Puerto Rican flag in their ring gear. On February 28, 2015 Misterioso Jr. and Sagrado defeated Delta and Guerrero Maya Jr. to win the CMLL Arena Coliseo Tag Team Championship for the first time.

== Championships and accomplishments ==
Only Championships won while part of Los Boricuas / La Comando Caribeño are listed.

- Consejo Mundial de Lucha Libre
  - CMLL Arena Coliseo Tag Team Championship (1 time, current) - Misterioso Jr. and Sagrado

== Luchas de Apuestas record ==
Only Apuestas matches fought while part of Los Boricuas / La Comando Caribeño are listed.

Winner (wager)	Loser (wager)	Location	Event	Date	Notes
Atlantis (mask)	El Boricua (mask)	Nuevo Laredo, Tamaulipas	Live event	August 13, 2001	
Atlantis (mask) (mask)	El Boricua	Celaya, Guanajuato	Live event	August 15, 2001	
Máscara Sagrada (mask)	El Boricua (mask)	Cuernavaca, Morelos	Live event	August 16, 2001	
Pierrothito (mask)	El Torito (mask)	Puebla, Puebla	Live event	November 26, 2001	(Note: Relevos Suicidas tag team; Lost to Tzuki and Ultimo Dragoncito and forced to wrestle each other.)
Gran Markus Jr. (hair)	Veneno (mask)	Mexico City	Live event	March 17, 2002	
Veneno (hair)	Super Brazo (hair)	Mexico City	Live event	May 25, 2002	
Veneno (hair) and Violencia (mask)	Mr. México (hair) and Poder Mexica (mask)	Mexico City	Live event	July 14, 2002	
Universo 2000 (mask)	Bulldog (mask)	Mexico City	Live event	September 20, 2002	(Note: Torneo cibernetico tournament where the last man pinned is unmasked.)
Pierroth, Jr. (mask)	Máscara Año 2000 (hair)	Mexico City	Live event	September 27, 2002	
Pierroth, Jr. (mask)	Super Brazo (hair)	Cuernavaca, Morelos	Live event	October 17, 2002	
Gran Markus Jr. (hair)	Veneno (hair)	Mexico City	Live event	November 20, 2002	
Pierroth, Jr. (mask)	Apolo Dantés (hair)	Mexico City	Live event	February 18, 2003	
Pierroth, Jr. (mask)	Gran Markus, Jr. (hair)	Mexico City	Live event	March 21, 2003	
Nitro (mask)	Brazo de Oro (hair)	Tlalnepantla, Mexico State	Live event	April 16, 2003	(Note: Steel cage match that also included Pierroth, Violencia, Brazo de Oro, Jr. and Brazo de Plata.)
Pequeño Olímpico (mask)	Pequeño Violencia (mask)	Mexico City	Live event	April 30, 2003	
Pierroth, Jr. (mask)	Cien Caras (hair)	Mexico City	Live event	June 20, 2003	
Pierroth, Jr. (mask)	Brazo de Plata (hair)	Cuernavaca, Morelos, Mexico	Live event	July 31, 2003	
Violencia (mask)	Golden Dragon (mask)	Cuernavaca, Morelos, Mexico	Live event	August 7, 2003	
Pierroth Jr. (mask)	Violencia (mask)	Mexico City	Live event	September 19, 2003	
