= Homenaje a Dos Leyendas: El Santo y Salvador Lutteroth (2002) =

Mexican professional wrestling supercard show

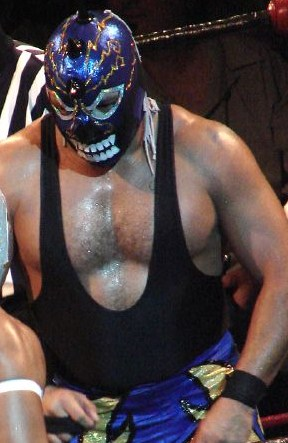
- Mephisto, part of the Los Infernales group.
- Promotion: Consejo Mundial de Lucha Libre
- Date: March 17, 2002
- City: Mexico City, Mexico
- Venue: Arena México
- Tagline: Apocalipsis ("Apocalypse")

Event chronology
← Previous; Copa de Arena Mexico	Next → International Gran Prix

Homenaje a Dos Leyendas chronology
← Previous; 2001	Next → 2003

Homenaje a Dos Leyendas: El Santo y Salvador Lutteroth (2002) (Spanish for "Homage to Two Legends: El Santo and Salvador Lutteroth") was a professional wrestling pay-per-view event, scripted and produced by Consejo Mundial de Lucha Libre (CMLL; "World Wrestling Council"). The Dos Leyendas show took place on March 17, 2002 in CMLL's main venue, Arena México, Mexico City, Mexico. The event was to honor and remember CMLL founder Salvador Lutteroth, who died in March 1987. This was the first major March show under the Homenaje a Dos Leyendas name, having previously been known as Homenaje a Salvador Lutteroth. Starting in 1999 CMLL honored not just their founder, but also El Santo, the most famous Mexican professional wrestler ever. The name of the annual March event would later be shortened to just Homenaje a Dos Leyendas after CMLL had a falling out with El Santo's son El Hijo del Santo, with the event honoring a different wrestler along with Lutteroth. The event was also billed as Apocalypsis ("Apocalypse") with the "Homenaje a Dos Leyenda" serving more as a tag line to tie the event into the previous shows honoring Lutteroth and El Santo.

The main event saw Gran Markus Jr. defeat Veneno contested under Lucha de Apuestas rules, which meant that Veneno bet his mask on the outcome and was forced to remove his mask and state his birth name, Rafael Ernesto Medina Baeza. The card featured five further matches, including a Six-man "Lucha Libre rules" tag team match for the vacant CMLL World Trios Championship which saw Blue Panther, Dr. Wagner Jr. and Fuerza Guerrera defeated Antifaz del Norte, Black Warrior and Mr. Niebla two falls to one to win the championship. The show featured three additional Six-man "Lucha Libre rules" tag team matches and a tag team match.

== Production ==
=== Background ===
Since 1996 the Mexican wrestling company Consejo Mundial de Lucha Libre (Spanish for "World Wrestling Council"; CMLL) has held a show in March each year to commemorate the passing of CMLL founder Salvador Lutteroth who died in March 1987. For the first three years the show paid homage to Lutteroth himself, from 1999 through 2004 the show paid homage to Lutteroth and El Santo, Mexico's most famous wrestler ever and from 2005 forward the show has paid homage to Lutteroth and a different leyenda ("Legend") each year, celebrating the career and accomplishments of past CMLL stars. Originally billed as Homenaje a Salvador Lutteroth, it has been held under the Homenaje a Dos Leyendas ("Homage to two legends") since 1999 and is the only show outside of CMLL's Anniversary shows that CMLL has presented every year since its inception. All Homenaje a Dos Leyendas shows have been held in Arena México in Mexico City, Mexico, which is CMLL's main venue, its "home". Traditionally CMLL holds their major events on Friday Nights, which means the Homenaje a Dos Leyendas shows replace their regularly scheduled Super Viernes show. The 2002 show was the seventh overall Homenaje a Dos Leyendas show.

=== Storylines ===
The Homenaje a Dos Leyendas show featured six professional wrestling matches with different wrestlers involved in pre-existing scripted feuds, plots and storylines. Wrestlers were portrayed as either heels (referred to as rudos in Mexico, those that portray the "bad guys") or faces (técnicos in Mexico, the "good guy" characters) as they followed a series of tension-building events, which culminated in a wrestling match or series of matches. The 2002 Homenaje a Dos Leyendas show aired live on Sky PPV, which was the last CMLL show to do so for a number of years.

The driving storyline behind the 2002 Dos Leyendas show was Gran Markus Jr.'s split from Pierroth Jr.'s Los Boricuas rudo group only a few months prior to the show. His opponent, Veneno, was one of the younger members of Pierroth Jr.'s group, trying to make a name for himself by taking on the "traitor". The semi main event was the finals of a tournament to crown the next holders of the CMLL World Trios Championship. The title was Vacated when the previous title holders, Black Warrior, Dr. Wagner Jr. and Blue Panther broke up as Black Warrior turned tecnico. Each side chose new teammates to compete for the title. Wagner and Panther chose Fuerza Guerrera as their partner while Black Warrior aligned himself with Mr. Niebla and Antifaz del Norte.

=== Homage to Salvador Lutteroth and El Santo ===
In September 1933 Salvador Lutteroth González founded Empresa Mexicana de Lucha Libre (EMLL), which would later be renamed Consejo Mundial de Lucha Libre. Over time Lutteroth would become responsible for building both Arena Coliseo in Mexico City and Arena Mexico, which became known as "The Cathedral of Lucha Libre". Over time EMLL became the oldest wrestling promotion in the world, with 2018 marking the 85th year of its existence. Lutteroth has often been credited with being the "father of Lucha Libre", introducing the concept of masked wrestlers to Mexico as well as the Luchas de Apuestas match. Lutteroth died on September 5, 1987. EMLL, late CMLL, remained under the ownership and control of the Lutteroth family as first Salvador's son Chavo Lutteroth and later his grandson Paco Alonso took over ownership of the company.

The life and achievements of Salvador Lutteroth is always honored at the annual Homenaje a Dos Leyenda' show and since 1999 CMLL has also honored a second person, a Leyenda of lucha libre, in some ways CMLL's version of their Hall of Fame. For several years the second Leyenda honored was the Mexican cultural icon El Santo whose popularity transcended both lucha libre and lucha films. El Santo, real name Rodolfo Guzmán Huerta (September 23, 1917 – February 5, 1984), was an active wrestler from 1934 until 1982, who also starred in over 50 lucha films between 1958 and 1982. Through his popularity and the roles he played in his films, El Santo became a Mexican folk hero and became a symbol of Mexican wrestling across the world. During his career, he mainly wrestled for Empresa Mundial de Lucha Libre in Mexico where he won the Mexican National Light Heavyweight Championship, Mexican National Middleweight Championship, Mexican National Tag Team Championship with Rayo de Jalisco, Mexican National Welterweight Championship, NWA World Middleweight Championship and the NWA World Welterweight Championship. He is said to have popularized professional wrestling in Mexico just as Rikidōzan did in Japan or like Hulk Hogan did in the United States. Guzmán's son followed him into wrestling as El Hijo del Santo, or the 'Son of Santo'. In 2018, WWE inducted him into their Hall of Fame in the Legacy category.

== Aftermath ==
After the main event Veneno was forced to unmask and state his birth name, Rafael Ernesto Medina Baeza, as is tradition in lucha libre. Gran Markus Jr.'s feud with Pierroth and the rest of Los Boricuas stretched into 2004 with Pierroth defeating Gran Markus Jr. in a Luchas de Apuestas match that was the main event of the 2003 Homenaje a Dos Leyendas: El Santo y Salvador Lutteroth show.

== Results ==
No.	Results	Stipulations	Times
1	Bracito de Oro and Pequeño Olímpico defeated Fire and Guerrerito del Future - two falls to one	Best two-out-of-three falls tag team match	13:12
2	La Fiera, Olímpico and Safari defeated Doctor X, Violencia and Zumbido - two falls to one	Best two-out-of-three falls six-man "Lucha Libre rules" tag team match	17:01
3	Los Infernales (Averno, Mephisto and El Satánico) defeated El Felino, Negro Casas and Super Parka - two falls to one	Best two-out-of-three falls six-man "Lucha Libre rules" tag team match	16:45
4	Rayo de Jalisco Jr., Shocker and Vampiro defeated Los Guerreros del Infierno (Tarzan Boy and Último Guerrero) and Universo 2000 - two falls to one	Best two-out-of-three falls six-man "Lucha Libre rules" tag team match	18:28
5	Blue Panther, Dr. Wagner Jr. and Fuerza Guerrera defeated Antifaz del Norte, Black Warrior and Mr. Niebla - two falls to one	Best two-out-of-three falls six-man "Lucha Libre rules" tag team match for the vacant CMLL World Trios Championship	—
6	Gran Markus Jr. defeated Veneno - two falls to one	Best two-out-of-three falls Lucha de Apuesta, Hair vs. Mask match	—
