= Juicio Final (2000) =

Pay-per-view professional wrestling match

- Official poster for the show depicting Villano III and Atlantis
- Promotion: Consejo Mundial de Lucha Libre (CMLL)
- Date: March 17, 2000
- City: Mexico City, Mexico
- Venue: Arena México
- Attendance: 20,000
- Tagline(s): Homenaje a Dos Leyendas: El Santo y Salvador Lutteroth

Pay-per-view chronology
← Previous; Torneo Gran Alternativa	Next →: 44. Aniversario de Arena México

Juicio Final chronology
← Previous; 1999	Next → 2001

Homenaje a Dos Leyendas chronology
← Previous; 1999	Next → 2001

Juicio Final (2000) (Spanish for "Final Judgment") was a professional wrestling Pay-Per-View (PPV) show event produced by Consejo Mundial de Lucha Libre (CMLL) that took place on March 17, 2000 in Arena México, Mexico City, Mexico. The show was produced with the tag line, Homenaje a Dos Leyendas: El Santo y Salvador Lutteroth (Spanish for "Homage to Two Legends: El Santo and Salvador Lutteroth") to honor and remember CMLL founder Salvador Lutteroth and El Santo, the most famous Mexican wrestler ever. This was the tenth time that CMLL used the name "Jucio Final" for one of their major shows.

The show featured six matches in total with the main event of the show being a Lucha de Apuestas, mask vs. mask match between Villano III and Atlantis in a match that has been called "The biggest Apuesta match of the decade". The match was voted the 2000 Match of the Year in the Wrestling Observer Newsletter awards. The show featured four additional matches, including two Six-man "Lucha Libre rules" tag team matches, a singles match and a 16-man Torneo cibernetico elimination match.

== Production ==
=== Background ===
Since 1996 the Mexican wrestling company Consejo Mundial de Lucha Libre (Spanish for "World Wrestling Council"; CMLL) has held a show in March each year to commemorate the passing of CMLL founder Salvador Lutteroth who died in March 1987. For the first three years the show paid homage to Lutteroth himself, from 1999 through 2004 the show paid homage to Lutteroth and El Santo, Mexico's most famous wrestler ever and from 2005 forward the show has paid homage to Lutteroth and a different leyenda ("Legend") each year, celebrating the career and accomplishments of past CMLL stars. Originally billed as Homenaje a Salvador Lutteroth, it has been held under the Homenaje a Dos Leyendas ("Homage to two legends") since 1999 and is the only show outside of CMLL's Anniversary shows that CMLL has presented every year since its inception. All Homenaje a Dos Leyendas shows have been held in Arena México in Mexico City, Mexico which is CMLL's main venue, its "home". Traditionally CMLL holds their major events on Friday Nights, which means the Homenaje a Dos Leyendas shows replace their regularly scheduled Super Viernes show. The 2000 show was the fifth overall Homenaje a Dos Leyendas show. The show was also billed as Jucio Final ("Final Judgement"), an event name or tag line that CMLL has used intermittently since the mid-1950s. It is no longer an annually recurring show, but instead held intermittently sometimes several years apart and not always in the same month of the year either. All Juicio Final shows have been held in Arena México in Mexico City, Mexico which is CMLL's main venue, its "home".

=== Storylines ===
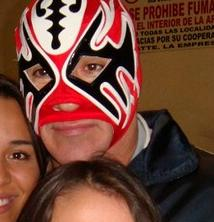
Wrestler Atlantis who competed in the Lucha de Apuesta main event match.

The JuicioFinal show featured six professional wrestling matches with different wrestlers involved in pre-existing scripted feuds, plots and storylines. Wrestlers were portrayed as either heels (referred to as rudos in Mexico, those that portray the "bad guys") or faces (técnicos in Mexico, the "good guy" characters) as they followed a series of tension-building events, which culminated in a wrestling match or series of matches.

== Results ==
No.	Results	Stipulations	Times
1	Ricky Marvin defeated Sangre Azteca - Two falls to one	Best two-out-of-three falls Singles match	09:50
2	Arkangel de la Muerte, Dr. O'Borman Jr., Último Guerrero, Zumbido, Rencor Latino, Mr. Mexico, Violencia and Rey Bucanero defeated Tigre Blanco, Máscara Mágica, Astro Rey Jr., Starman, Antifaz del Norte, Tony Rivera, Safari, and Olímpico – Último Guerrero was the only survivor	Torneo Generación XXI, 16-man Torneo cibernetico elimination match	24:16
3	Brazo de Plata, Mr. Niebla and Emilio Charles Jr. defeated Los Capos (Apolo Dantés, Cien Caras and Universo 2000) - Two falls to one	Best two-out-of-three falls six-man "Lucha Libre rules" tag team match	16:05
4	Shocker, Máscara Año 2000 and Scorpio Jr. defeated Perro Aguayo, Tarzan Boy and Rayo de Jalisco Jr. - Two falls to one	Best two-out-of-three falls six-man "Lucha Libre rules" tag team match	17:26
5	Atlantis defeated Villano III	Lucha de Apuesta, Mask vs. Mask match	25:28

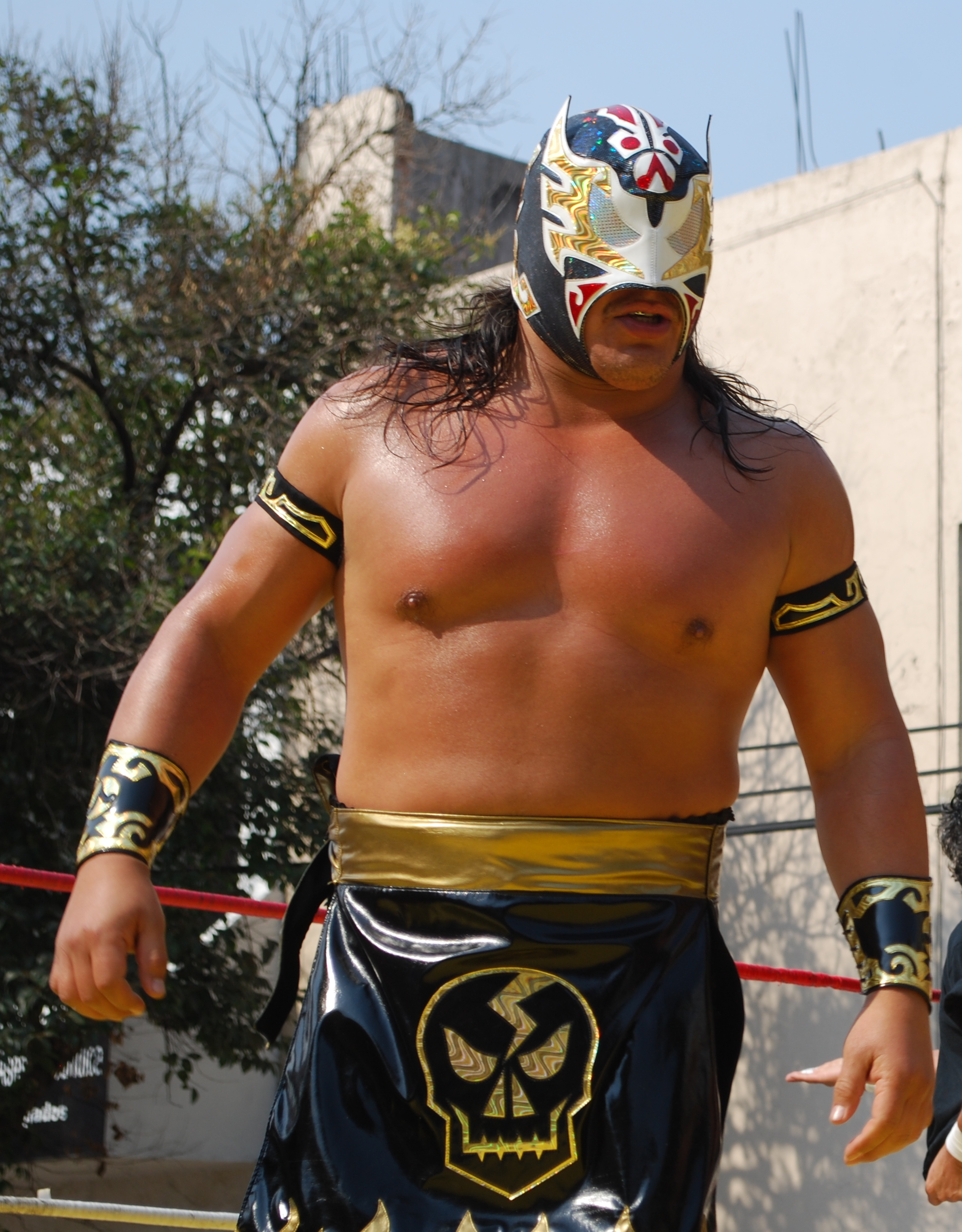
Último Guerrero winner of the Torneo Generación XXI.

Torneo Generación XXI order of elimination

No.	Eliminated	Eliminated by	Time
1	Dr. O'Borman Jr.	Tigre Blanco	05:56
2	Starman	Rencor Latino	07:40
3	Violencia	Máscara Mágica	08:35
4	Tigre Blanco	Zumbido	10:01
5	Zumbido	Antifaz	11:46
6	Rencor Latino	Safari	13:19
7	Safari	Último Guerrero	13:43
8	Tony Rivera	Mr. Mexico	15:06
9	Arkangel	Máscara Mágica	16:23
10	Máscara Mágica	Rey Bucanero	17:09
11	Rey Bucanero	Astro Rey Jr.	18:05
12	Astro Rey Jr.	Mr. Mexico	20:25
13	Mr. Mexico	Olímpico	21:36
14	Antifaz	Unknown	N/A
15	Olímpico	Último Guerrero	24:10
16	Winner	Último Guerrero	24:10
