= Juicio Final (2001) =

Mexican professional wrestling supercard show

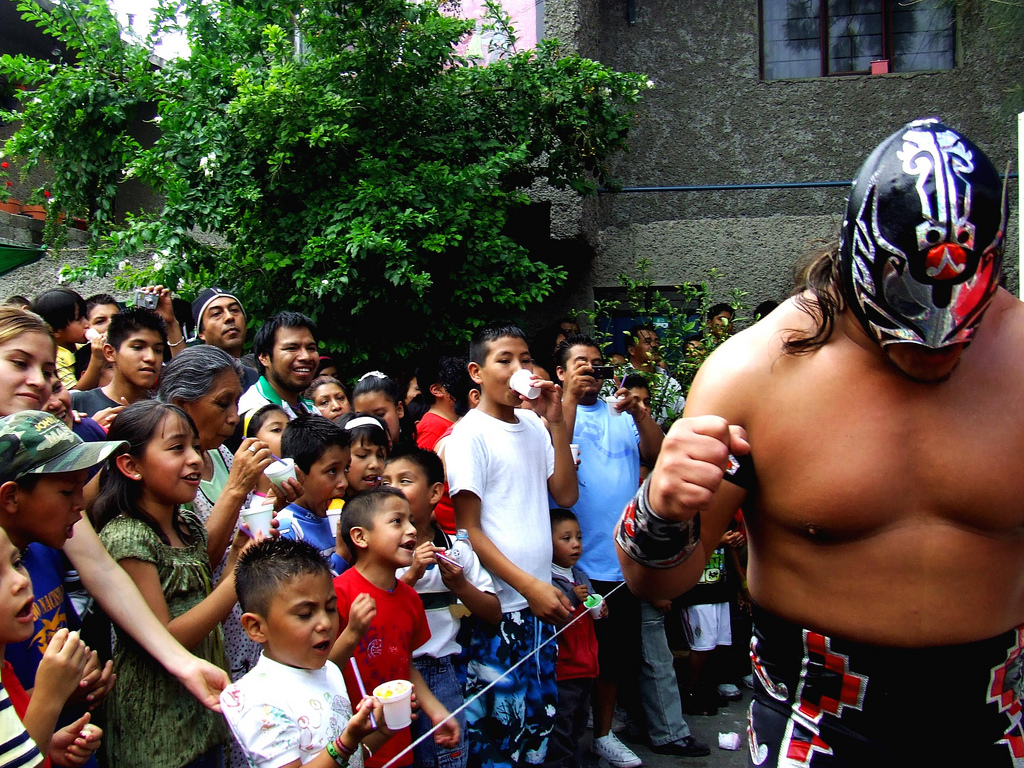
- Último Guerrero, part of Los Guerreros del Infierno
- Promotion: Consejo Mundial de Lucha Libre
- Date: March 30, 2001
- City: Mexico City, Mexico
- Venue: Arena México
- Attendance: 17,670
- Tagline(s): Homenaje a Dos Leyendas: El Santo y Salvador Lutteroth

Pay-per-view chronology
← Previous; Sin Piedad	Next →: 45. Aniversario de Arena México

Juicio Final chronology
← Previous; 2000	Next → 2005

Homenaje a Dos Leyendas chronology
← Previous; 2000	Next → 2002

Juicio Final (2001) (Spanish for "Final Judgement") was a professional wrestling Pay-Per-View (PPV) show event produced by Consejo Mundial de Lucha Libre (CMLL) that took place on March 30, 2001 in Arena México, Mexico City, Mexico. The show was produced with the tag line, Homenaje a Dos Leyendas: El Santo y Salvador Lutteroth (Spanish for "Homage to Two Legends: El Santo and Salvador Lutteroth") to honor and remember CMLL founder Salvador Lutteroth and El Santo, the most famous Mexican wrestler ever. This was the eleventh time that CMLL used the name "Jucio Final" for one of their major shows.

The following year the March show would be presented only as Homenaje a Dos Leyendas: El Santo y Salvador Lutteroth once again, with CMLL not using the Juicio Final show name until 2005. The show featured six matches in total with the main event of the show being a Lucha de Apuestas, hair vs. mask match. The match saw Perro Aguayo put his hair on the line and Universo 2000 "bet" his mask on the outcome of the match. The show featured four Six-man "Lucha Libre rules" tag team matches including a match for the Mexican National Trios Championship and a Mini-Estrella tag team match.

== Production ==
=== Background ===
Since 1996 the Mexican wrestling company Consejo Mundial de Lucha Libre (Spanish for "World Wrestling Council"; CMLL) has held a show in March each year to commemorate the passing of CMLL founder Salvador Lutteroth who died in March 1987. For the first three years the show paid homage to Lutteroth himself, from 1999 through 2004 the show paid homage to Lutteroth and El Santo, Mexico's most famous wrestler ever and from 2005 forward the show has paid homage to Lutteroth and a different leyenda ("Legend") each year, celebrating the career and accomplishments of past CMLL stars. Originally billed as Homenaje a Salvador Lutteroth, it has been held under the Homenaje a Dos Leyendas ("Homage to two legends") since 1999 and is the only show outside of CMLL's Anniversary shows that CMLL has presented every year since its inception. All Homenaje a Dos Leyendas shows have been held in Arena México in Mexico City, Mexico which is CMLL's main venue, its "home". Traditionally CMLL holds their major events on Friday Nights, which means the Homenaje a Dos Leyendas shows replace their regularly scheduled Super Viernes show. The 2001 show was the sixth overall Homenaje a Dos Leyendas show. The show was also billed as Jucio Final ("Final Judgement"), an event name or tag line that CMLL has used intermittently since the mid-1950s. It is no longer an annually recurring show, but instead held intermittently sometimes several years apart and not always in the same month of the year either. All Juicio Final shows have been held in Arena México in Mexico City, Mexico which is CMLL's main venue, its "home".

=== Storylines ===
The Juicio Final show featured six professional wrestling matches with different wrestlers involved in pre-existing scripted feuds, plots and storylines. Wrestlers were portrayed as either heels (referred to as rudos in Mexico, those that portray the "bad guys") or faces (técnicos in Mexico, the "good guy" characters) as they followed a series of tension-building events, which culminated in a wrestling match or series of matches.

== Results ==
No.	Results	Stipulations	Times
1	Tzuki and Ultimo Dragoncito defeated El Fierito and Pierrothito - Two falls to one	Best two-out-of-three falls Tag team match	13:11
2	Astro Rey Jr., Pantera and El Felino defeated Rencor Latino, Arkangel de la Muerte and Veneno - Two falls to one	Best two-out-of-three falls six-man "Lucha Libre rules" tag team match	14:17
3	Atlantis, Brazo de Plata and Negro Casas defeated Dr. Wagner Jr., Scorpio Jr. and Apolo Dantés - Two falls to one	Best two-out-of-three falls six-man "Lucha Libre rules" tag team match	18:00
4	Olímpico, Safari and Mr. Niebla defeated Blue Panther, Fuerza Guerrera and El Signo (c) - Two falls to one	Best two-out-of-three falls six-man "Lucha Libre rules" tag team match for the Mexican National Trios Championship	21:50
5	El Satánico, Shocker and Black Warrior defeated Los Guerreros del Infierno (Último Guerrero, Rey Bucanero and Tarzan Boy) - Two falls to one	Best two-out-of-three falls six-man "Lucha Libre rules" tag team match. The winning team gains the name of Los Infernales.	16:45
6	Universo 2000 defeated Perro Aguayo - Two falls to one	Best two-out-of-three falls Lucha de Apuestas, mask vs. hair match. As a result of the match Perro Aguayo was shaved bald after the match.	15:42
(c) / – the champion(s) heading into the match
