= Perro Aguayo Jr. =

Mexican professional wrestler (1979–2015)

- Aguayo in 2012

Personal information
- Born: Pedro Aguayo Ramírez; July 23, 1979 Mexico City, Mexico
- Died: March 21, 2015 (aged 35) Tijuana, Baja California, Mexico
- Cause of death: Cardiac arrest and cervical spine trauma
- Family: Perro Aguayo (father)

Professional wrestling career
- Ring name(s): Cachorro Aguayo; El Hijo del Perro Aguayo; Perrito Aguayo; Perro Aguayo Jr.
- Billed height: 1.68 m (5 ft 6 in)
- Billed weight: 75 kg (165 lb)
- Billed from: Zacatecas, Mexico
- Trained by: Perro Aguayo; Gran Cochisse
- Debut: June 18, 1995

Pedro Aguayo Ramírez (July 23, 1979 – March 21, 2015) was a Mexican professional wrestler and promoter who achieved fame in wrestling as Perro Aguayo Jr. or El Hijo del Perro Aguayo ("The Son of Perro Aguayo"). Aguayo was best known as the leader of the Los Perros del Mal stable, which he started in Consejo Mundial de Lucha Libre (CMLL) in mid-2004. The stable became a significant draw in Mexican professional wrestling, peaking during Aguayo's storyline rivalries with Místico and Héctor Garza. In October 2008, Aguayo left CMLL to start his own independent professional wrestling promotion Perros del Mal Producciones, built around members of his Los Perros del Mal stable. In June 2010, Aguayo returned to AAA after a seven-year absence to start an invasion storyline involving his stable.

While performing in a wrestling match on March 20, 2015, Aguayo died almost instantly from cardiac arrest after fracturing three vertebrae. Following his death, Aguayo was inducted into the AAA Hall of Fame and the Wrestling Observer Newsletter Hall of Fame.

== Early life ==
Pedro Aguayo Ramírez was born on July 23, 1979, in Mexico City, Mexico, the son of Luz Ramírez and Pedro Aguayo Damián, a professional wrestler known under the ring name Perro Aguayo. His uncle, Jesús Ramírez Ángel, was better known under the name Ídolo and his cousins competed as Ídolo I and Ídolo II. Aguayo's cousin works as "Pepe Aguayo", inspired by Perro Sr.

== Professional wrestling career ==
=== AAA (1995–2003) ===
Debuting professionally at the age of 15, Aguayo Jr. started out wrestling established veterans in AAA. He often teamed with his father, and the pair won the Mexican National Tag Team Championship on two occasions, defeating the teams of Fuerza Guerrera/Mosco de la Merced and El Cobarde II/El Cobarde Jr., respectively. Aguayo Jr. worked his first major show on June 18, 1995, when he faced and lost to Juventud Guerrera as part of Triplemanía III-B. Aguayo Jr. formed a team of all "juniors", Los Junior Atómicos, including Blue Demon Jr., La Parka Jr. and Máscara Sagrada Jr. The four defeated Charly Manson, May Flowers, Nygma and El Picudo to win the Mexican National Atómicos Championship during a show in Jalisco. Five months later they lost the championship to Los Vipers (Histeria, Maniaco, Mosco de la Merced and Psicosis) at the 1999 Verano de Escándalo show. After Los Junior Atómicos disbanded, Aguayo began teaming regularly with Héctor Garza, engaging in a four-way storyline feud with Heavy Metal and Latin Lover. These four competed in various tag and four-way matches throughout the lengthy feud. One of the highlights of the storyline was Heavy Metal being shaved bald after losing a combination four-way steel cage match and lucha de apuesta on the 2001 Guerra de Titanes show, when Garza pinned Heavy Metal. Later on Latin Lover would defeat Garza in another lucha de apuesta. Aguayo Jr. and Garza defeated Los Vipers (Abismo Negro and Electroshock) to win the Mexican National Tag Team Championship. The duo held the title for 61 days before losing it to Pirata Morgan and El Texano.

=== Consejo Mundial de Lucha Libre (2003–2008) ===
In May 2003, Aguayo Jr. moved to Consejo Mundial de Lucha Libre (CMLL). He was initially brought in as a técnico to team with Negro Casas against Los Guerreros del Infierno, but did not receive the expected positive reactions from the crowd, and CMLL decided to turn him heel by having him win a tournament for a shot at Atlantis' Michinoku Pro Wrestling Tohoku Junior Heavyweight Championship. He won the tournament over established popular heels like Dr. Wagner Jr. and Rey Bucanero, so by the time he met the babyface Atlantis for the title, he was seen as a heel by the fans. The title challenge was unsuccessful, but Aguayo was quickly put into a program with Los Capos with the story being he was getting revenge on Universo 2000 for ending his father's career. During this feud, Shocker's popular Los Guapos group backed Aguayo Jr. and he became a face again. The feud continued through the winter and into 2004 and was ended when Aguayo and El Terrible (a member of Los Guapos) defeated Cien Caras and Máscara Año 2000 in a double hair vs. hair match at the 2004 Homenaje a Dos Leyendas: El Santo y Salvador Lutteroth show. In the spring, Aguayo Jr. once again backed up Negro Casas and Shocker in their feud with Pierroth Jr., Vampiro Canadiense and Tarzan Boy. The two groups went at it in trios, singles, and tag matches before they were put in the annual "Cage of Death" match, in which the last two men in the cage, regardless of which team they are on, would face each other in a hair vs. hair match. The heel trio escaped early and Shocker made a quick exit as well. Aguayo Jr. and Casas then faced each other, and Aguayo Jr. pinned Casas, winning his hair. Tensions began to rise between Casas and Aguayo Jr. after that point, and when Héctor Garza jumped to CMLL in July, Aguayo Jr. ditched Casas and joined him. After turning heel again, he took part in the Leyenda de Plata tournament, held in honor of El Santo. After securing his place in the semifinals, Aguayo Jr. interfered in Negro Casas' match with Atlantis, costing Casas the bout and allowing Atlantis to advance. After defeating Atlantis in the semifinals, Aguayo Jr. faced the previous year's winner, Felino, for the trophy. After Aguayo Jr. won the match, El Hijo del Santo came to the ring to award him the trophy, but Aguayo Jr. smashed it, claiming that Santo wasn't nearly the legend that Perro Aguayo Sr. was. The angle was hot and played off the feud the original Santo and Perro Aguayo had during the 1970s. Due to El Hijo del Santo's short tour with CMLL, the feud was rushed towards an indecisive singles match. The closest thing to closure for the feud was a trios match at the CMLL 71st Anniversary Show, during which the team of Hijo del Perro Aguayo, Hèctor Garza and El Terrible (soon to be named La Furia del Norte) defeated Hijo del Santo, Negro Casas and Shocker. After that match, Santo focused more on his program with Averno and Los Guerreros del Infierno and Aguayo Jr. set his sights on Casas (to whom he lost), and the feud cooled down from there.

Starting in November 2004, Aguayo Jr. restarted his feud with Los Capos by teaming frequently with Vampiro and Pierroth Jr., who were also feuding with Los Capos at the time. At the year-end show, he had another singles match with Universo 2000 which led to Aguayo's father running in and making the save. In February 2005, Perro Aguayo Sr. returned to wrestling for one match, teaming with his son against Cien Caras and Máscara Año 2000 in a double hair vs. hair match. The Aguayos won the match (which was also billed as Cien Caras' retirement match), in the main event of the 2005 Homenaje a Dos Leyendas show. After the match, La Familia de Tijuana (Halloween, Damián 666), and Aguayo Jr. decided to start a new faction, Los Perros del Mal ("The Bad Dogs"). Soon, the group would consist of Aguayo Jr., La Familia, La Furia del Norte, Blue Demon Jr., Pierroth Jr. and Pierroth's storyline sons. The group took on many rivals, including Negro Casas, Felino, Heavy Metal (who had just jumped from AAA), Máscara Mágica, Universo 2000 and Aguayo's new focus, the rising star Místico, who had defeated him in a main event singles match. The two agreed to a hair vs. mask match, but no date was specified. Los Perros del Mal faced off against their rivals in the 2005 "Cage of Death" match, in which Damián 666 took the hair of Máscara Mágica. On May 5, 2006, Aguayo Jr. was defeated by Rayo de Jalisco Jr. and El Canek in a three-way match for the IWRG Intercontinental Heavyweight Championship in Nezahualcoyotl. Aguayo Jr.'s final major feud in CMLL was with Héctor Garza, which culminated in a Hair vs. Hair match on March 21, 2008, at Homenaje a Dos Leyendas, which Aguayo Jr. won via a low blow.

=== Los Perros del Mal and return to AAA (2008–2015) ===
Aguayo Jr. left CMLL in October 2008, along with fellow Los Perros Del Mal members Damián 666 and Mr. Águila, to start his own promotion called Perros del Mal Producciones. The new promotion's debut show took place on December 7, 2008, in Mexico City. On that show, Aguayo Jr. tag-teamed with Cibernético and Dr. Wagner Jr. to face L.A. Park, Olímpico and Headhunter A, and was victorious.

On June 6, 2010, at Triplemanía XVIII, Aguayo returned to AAA to lead Perros del Mal in an invasion of the promotion. The group quickly aligned themselves with Konnan and Dorian Roldan's La Legión Extranjera, La Milicia and Los Maniacos to form La Sociedad. On August 14 at Verano de Escandalo El Hijo del Perro Aguayo wrestled his first major match for AAA since his return, when he, L.A. Park and Damián 666 defeated El Mesías, Cibernético and La Parka in a six-man tag team match, when Perro pinned Mesías. On October 1 at Héroes Inmortales IV El Mesías defeated Perro in a singles match. Afterwards, Aguayo injured his knee, sidelining him for the rest of the year. However, he made a surprise appearance on December 5, 2010, during the main event of Guerra de Titanes, helping Damián 666, Halloween and X-Fly hand Los Psycho Circus their first-ever loss in a steel cage weapons match. On March 18, 2011, at Rey de Reyes, Aguayo Jr. joined Damián 666, Halloween and Super Crazy in a winning effort against Potencia Mundial (Dr. Wagner Jr. and Los Psycho Circus); Aguayo Jr. pinned Wagner with La Lanza, following a chair shot.

On April 8, 2011. Aguayo Jr. underwent emergency surgery to remove a golf ball-sized tumor from his stomach. During the surgery, a peptic ulcer burst, and he was placed in an intensive care unit at the hospital in Guadalajara, Jalisco. Aguayo Jr. was released from the hospital on April 19 and was scheduled to receive treatment for his condition for a full year. Aguayo's tumor was found to be benign; Aguayo made his return to AAA, in a non–wrestling role, on May 1 and returned to the ring on May 8 in a six-man tag team match pitting Los Perros del Mal against Los Psycho Circus; Aguayo pinned Psycho Clown after a low blow. The feud continued on May 29 at Perros del Mal Producciones' third anniversary show, when Los Psycho Circus defeated Los Perros del Mal in a six-man tag team steel cage mask vs. hair match. As a result, Super Crazy, the last man left in the cage, was shaved bald. Aguayo Jr. was set to wrestle as part of Los Perros del Mal at Triplemanía XIX, facing Los Psycho Circus to determine the first-ever AAA World Trios Champions, but was forced to pull out of the event due to an adverse reaction to the medication given to him as part of his tumor treatment. Aguayo returned on July 24 at a Perros del Mal event, teaming with Damián 666 and Halloween against Blue Demon Jr., Cassandro and L.A. Park; the match ended in a no contest when Park turned on his partners. Aguayo Jr. next returned to AAA on August 19, replacing L.A. Park and teaming with Damián 666 and Halloween against El Mesías, Joe Líder and El Zorro in a six-man tag team match, which they lost via disqualification when Líder was attacked by his former tag team partner Nicho el Millonario. After the match, Aguayo officially named Nicho the newest member of Los Perros del Mal. Aguayo Jr. returned to pay-per-view on October 9, 2011, at Héroes Inmortales, unsuccessfully challenging Dr. Wagner Jr. for the AAA Latin American Championship in a bullterrier match. Afterward, Aguayo Jr. began a feud with Jack Evans. On December 16, 2011, at Guerra de Titanes, Aguayo and Evans continued their rivalry in a six-man tag team match, during which they busted each other open. The match was won when Aguayo Jr.'s teammate Héctor Garza pinned Fénix. The feud between Aguayo Jr. and Evans continued through to Rey de Reyes on March 18, 2012, when Aguayo Jr. pinned Evans to win the Rey de Reyes tournament and earn a chance to contend for the AAA Mega Championship. On August 5 at Triplemanía XX, Aguayo Jr. unsuccessfully challenged El Mesías for the AAA Mega Championship. Afterwards, Aguayo Jr. started a year-long rivalry with Cibernético, which culminated in a lucha de apuesta in the main event of Triplemanía XXI on June 16, 2013. Aguayo Jr. was victorious, forcing Cibernético to have his head shaved bald.

In August 2013, Aguayo teamed with Cibernético against his former stable, La Secta. On October 18 at Héroes Inmortales VII, La Secta eliminated Aguayo Jr., Cibernético, and El Mesías from the Copa Antonio Peña, which led to the three retaliating by costing Secta members Dark Escoria and Dark Espiritu their match for the AAA World Tag Team Championship. Aguayo Jr.'s tecnico turn was completed on November 22, when Los Perros del Mal members Daga and Psicosis turned on him, labeling him a traitor for teaming with Cibernético. However, on December 8 at Guerra de Titanes, Aguayo Jr. turned on Cibernético, rejoined Daga and Psicosis and brought Los Perros del Mal back under the umbrella of the reformed La Sociedad. On August 17, 2014, at Triplemanía XXII, Aguayo Jr. started a new feud with the debuting El Patrón by attacking him and his father Dos Caras at the start of the show. Later that night in the main event, Aguayo Jr. defeated Cibernético, Dr. Wagner Jr. and Myzteziz, in a four-way elimination match to win Copa Triplemanía XXII. After the match, Aguayo Jr. was immediately attacked by El Patrón. Subsequently, Aguayo Jr. and El Texano Jr. defeated El Patrón and El Mesías at Héroes Inmortales VIII. In subsequent months, Aguayo Jr. focused on Myzteziz, and resuming the storyline that started in CMLL when Myzteziz was known as Místico, by issuing a challenge for a mask vs. hair match at Triplemanía XXIII. The story led to the main event of the 2015 Rey de Reyes, in which Aguayo Jr. teamed up with Pentagón Jr., only to lose to Myzteziz and the returning Rey Mysterio Jr.

== Death ==
On March 20, 2015, Aguayo wrestled a tag team match, teaming with Manik against Rey Mysterio Jr. and Xtreme Tiger at a show for The Crash promotion in Tijuana, Baja California, Mexico. During the match, Mysterio used a headscissors takedown which according to him was supposed to propel Aguayo into the 619 position on the ropes, but for some reason he bumped and went out to the floor. Aguayo returned to the ring, upon which Mysterio dropkicked him in the shoulder to again set up for the 619 as he landed on the middle rope (the proper position for the 619). Aguayo appeared to attempt to stand up with his left leg. Manik then fell onto the middle rope beside Aguayo; when he appeared to be limp and unconscious, Manik shook him slightly to revive him. Mysterio bounced off the middle rope to perform the 619, but did not hit either opponent as Aguayo was already slumped over the middle rope and Manik ducked. While the match continued, Konnan, who was at ringside, then attempted to revive the seemingly unconscious Aguayo by shaking him. The match continued, with Mysterio next checking on the unmoving Aguayo, bringing it to the referee's attention. Mysterio then pinned Manik to end the match while Konnan again attempted to revive Aguayo.

With the match over, various personnel went to Aguayo, believing he was just unconscious and in need of medical help. Officials later brought him out of the ring. When paramedics arrived, Aguayo was brought to the local Del Prado hospital, where he was pronounced dead around 1:00 am on March 21. He was 35 years old.

According to the initial statement by the hospital, Aguayo died from a cervical spine trauma, reportedly as a result of the dropkick by Mysterio Jr. that propelled him forward to the ring ropes, causing severe whiplash trauma that snapped his neck. The cause of death was later determined as cardiac arrest, due to a cervical stroke caused by three fractured vertebrae. Autopsy results showed that Aguayo Jr. broke his C-1, C-2, and C-3 vertebrae. The coroner stated that the fractures took place at two different moments of impact and that Aguayo died almost instantly. An alternative angle uploaded by an audience member appears to show Aguayo moving his left leg after the initial impact. Aguayo Jr. was not immediately attended to by a physician and was actually taken from the ring on a piece of plywood instead of a stretcher, which led to some criticism of the event organizers. However, the coroner stated that it made no difference. The Tijuana wrestling commission later explained that the doctor was backstage, attending to two other injuries that happened during the show. One of those injuries was a spinal injury and they did not want to remove that wrestler from the stretcher he was on, which was why they used the plywood to move Aguayo from the ring. The doctors worked on resuscitating Aguayo for over an hour before declaring him dead. On March 21, the attorney general for Baja California conducted an investigation into Aguayo's death but no criminal charges were filed.

Aguayo Jr. was buried in Guadalajara on March 23 with Konnan and Rey Mysterio Jr. serving as pallbearers. Out of respect for Aguayo Jr, Rey attended the funeral without his mask. Mysterio's wife stated he went to the funeral as a human being, not a wrestler. Mysterio was devastated and faced Perro's family to give them his condolences. Perro's family told Rey Mysterio to "Not feel guilt, this was in God's hands, they understood completely." After his death, the Comisión de Deporte del Senado del México (The Commission of Sport of the Mexican Senate) presented the initiative "Ley para la Seguridad del Deporte en el País" (Law for the Safety of Sport in the Country").

Many promotions, including AAA, CMLL, The Crash, Lucha Underground and World Wrestling League (WWL), paid tribute to Aguayo Jr. following his death. On August 9, 2015, at Triplemanía XXIII, Aguayo Jr. was inducted into the AAA Hall of Fame.

== Championships and accomplishments ==
- AAA / Lucha Libre AAA World Wide
  - Mexican National Atómicos Championship (1 time) – with Blue Demon Jr., La Parka Jr. and Máscara Sagrada Jr.
  - Mexican National Light Heavyweight Championship (1 time)
  - Mexican National Tag Team Championship (3 times) – with Perro Aguayo (2), and Héctor Garza (1)
  - Copa Triplemanía XXII (2014)
  - Rey de Reyes (2012)
  - AAA Hall of Fame (Class of 2015)
- Consejo Mundial de Lucha Libre
  - CMLL World Trios Championship (1 time) – with Mr. Águila and Héctor Garza
  - Torneo Gran Alternativa (2006) – with Místerioso II
  - Leyenda de Plata (2004)
- Pro Wrestling Illustrated
  - Ranked No. 8 of the 500 best singles wrestlers in the PWI 500 in 2007
  - Ranked No. 301 of the top 500 greatest wrestlers in the "PWI Years" in 2003
- World Wrestling Association
  - WWA World Tag Team Championship (3 times) – with El Hijo del Santo (1), Último Guerrero (1), and Héctor Garza (1)
- Wrestling Observer Newsletter
  - Rookie of the Year (1995)
  - Wrestling Observer Newsletter Hall of Fame (Class of 2015)

== Luchas de Apuestas record ==
Winner (wager)	Loser (wager)	Location	Event	Date	Notes
Perro Aguayo Jr. (hair)	El Picudo (mask)	Naucalpan, Mexico State	Live event	December 3, 1995	(Note: The two lost a "Relevos Suicida" to Rey Misterio Jr. and Juventud Guerrera and were forced to wrestle each other.)
Perro Aguayo Jr. (hair)	Cobarde II (hair)	Tonalá, Jalisco	Verano de Escándalo	September 14, 1997	(Note: Aguayo, Jr. and Cobarde II were the last two men in a six-man Steel Cage match that also included Perro Aguayo, Heavy Metal, Sangre Chicana and Picudo.)
Perro Aguayo Jr. (hair)	El Picudo (hair)	Ciudad Madero, Tamaulipas	Guerra de Titanes	November 19, 1997	(Note: Aguayo, Jr. and Picudo were the last two men in a four-man Steel Cage match that also included Heavy Metal and Sangre Chicana.)
Perro Aguayo Jr. (hair)	El Cobarde II (hair)	Tijuana, Baja California	Live event	November 19, 1999	
Perro Aguayo Jr. (hair)	El Texano (hair)	Tijuana, Baja California	Live event	May 19, 2000	
Perro Aguayo Jr. (hair)	The Panther (Note: >Not the most recent wrestler to work as The Panther) (mask)	Monterrey, Nuevo León	Live event	August 19, 2001	
Perro Aguayo Jr. (hair)	El Dandy (hair)	Monterrey, Nuevo León	Verano de Escándalo	September 16, 2002	(Note: This was a four-way match that also included Hátor and El Zorro)
Perro Aguayo Jr. and El Terrible (hair)	Cien Caras and Máscara Año 2000 (hair)	Mexico City	Homenaje a Dos Leyendas	March 19, 2004	
Perro Aguayo Jr. (hair)	Negro Casas (hair)	Mexico City	Infierno en el Ring	June 18, 2004	(Note: Aguayo Jr. and Casas were the last two men in a six-man steel cage match that also included Tarzan Boy, Pierroth Jr., Shocker and Vampiro.)
Perro Aguayo and Perro Aguayo Jr. (hair)	Cien Caras and Máscara Año 2000 (hair)	Mexico City	Homenaje a Dos Leyendas	March 18, 2005	
Perro Aguayo Jr. (hair)	Universo 2000 (hair)	Mexico City	Homenaje a Dos Leyendas	March 17, 2006	
Perro Aguayo Jr. (hair)	Héctor Garza (hair)	Mexico City	Homenaje a Dos Leyendas	March 21, 2008	
Perro Aguayo Jr. (hair)	Cibernético (hair)	Mexico City	Triplemanía XXI	June 16, 2013	

== See also ==
- List of premature professional wrestling deaths
