= Gran Markus Jr. =

Mexican professional wrestler (1953–2026)

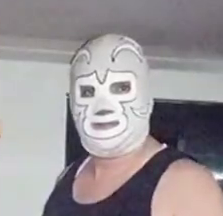

Personal information
- Born: Cándido Robles Cruz; August 14, 1953 Guadalajara, Jalisco, Mexico
- Died: April 24, 2026 (aged 72)

Professional wrestling career
- Ring name(s): Gran Markus Jr. Tony Benetto
- Billed height: 1.83 m (6 ft 0 in)
- Billed weight: 130 kg (287 lb)
- Billed from: Guadalajara, Jalisco
- Trained by: Diablo Velasco
- Debut: 1977
- Retired: 2016

Cándido Robles Cruz (August 14, 1953 – April 24, 2026) was a Mexican professional wrestler. Cruz is best known under the ring name Gran Markus Jr. and for his work in the Mexican promotion Consejo Mundial de Lucha Libre (CMLL). Cruz originally worked under the name "Tony Benetto" but in the late 1980s he changed to being a masked wrestler taking the name Gran Markus Jr. Cruz is not related to wrestler Gran Markus – it is a storyline relationship. Cruz has both teamed with and fought against the original Gran Markus. Cruz lost the "Gran Markus Jr." mask on June 29, 1997 when he lost a Luchas de Apuesta match, or "bet match" to Mil Máscaras.

== Professional wrestling career ==
Cándido Robles made his professional wrestling debut in 1977, adopting the ring name Tony Benetto upon his debut. As Benetto he initially wrestled on the independent circuit before signing with Empresa Mexicana de Lucha Libre (EMLL), Mexico's largest and the world's oldest wrestling promotion. On January 16, 1980 Benetto won his first championship when he defeated El Halcón to win the Mexican National Heavyweight Championship. His first reign with the title lasted until July 26, 1980, when he lost to rising newcomer Cien Caras. Over the next couple of years Benetto would team with Rayo de Jalisco Sr., defeating Sangre Chicana and Cien Caras to win the Mexican National Tag Team Championship on October 28, 1985. The duo held on to the championship until April 16, 1986 where they lost to Los Hermanos Dinamitas (Cien Caras and his brother Máscara Año 2000).

In 1987 Robles abandoned the "Tony Benetto" character in favor of an enmascarado, or masked character, called "Gran Markus Jr.". A character that, in storyline terms, was being presented as the son of Gran Markus, even if they were not actually related. Robles began wrestling under the white mask that had been Gran Markus' trademark for years, reinvigorating his professional wrestling career. On December 17, 1987, he became a two time Mexican National Heavyweight Champion, although it was not officially recognized as such at the time since there was no connection between the "Tony Benetto" character and Gran Markus Jr. The second reign ended on August 7, 1988, when he was defeated for the title by Alfonso Dantés. In 1989 Gran Markus Jr. began a storyline with the original Gran Markus, through which it was revealed that he was not actually the son of Gran Markus. During the storyline Gran Markus Jr. defeated Gran Markus in a Luchas de Apuesta, or bet match, where Gran Markus ended up shaved bald after the match. On July 9, 1990 Gran Markus Jr. won his third Mexican National Heavyweight Championship, defeating Popitekus for the belt. This third and final reign lasted three months before he lost the belt to Rayo de Jalisco Jr., son of his former tag team partner. In the early-1990s Gran Markus Jr. El Hijo del Gladiador and Dr. Wagner Jr. formed a team called La Ola Blanca ("the White Wave"), named after the original La Ola Blanca that consisted of Dr. Wagner Jr.'s father Dr. Wagner and Ángel Blanco. The trio defeated Los Brazos ("The Arms"; El Brazo, Brazo de Oro and Brazo de Plata) on April 22, 1994, to win the CMLL World Trios Championship. La Ola Blanca held the titles for almost a year, until March 31, 1995, when they were defeated by Los Cachales ("The Jackals"; Bestia Salvaje, Emilio Charles Jr. and Sangre Chicana). The following year Gran Markus Jr. and Hijo del Gladiador defeated Atlantis and Rayo de Jalisco Jr. to win the CMLL World Tag Team Championship on behalf of La Ola Blanca. Their reign with the tag team belts only lasted for a month as Atlantis and Lizmark won the belts on October 18, 1996. In the late 1990s La Ola Blanca disintegrated, helped along by Gran Markus Jr. losing his white mask in a Lucha de Apuesta match against Mil Máscaras on June 29, 1997. Following the mask loss Gran Markus Jr. worked a feud against Los Brazos, defeating Brazo de Oro in a Lucha de Apuesta, hair vs. hair match, but ended up losing his own hair to Brazo de Plata on May 29, 1998. In the years that followed Gran Markus Jr.'s career slowed down, working less dates and usually in smaller venues. During the early part of the 2000s Gran Markus Jr. lost Luchas de Apuesta matches against Atlantis, Rayo de Jalisco Jr., La Parka and Pierroth Jr., having his hair shaved off each time.

After Robles' retirement, another wrestler began using the "Gran Markus Jr." name on the Northern Mexican independent circuit. It was the more recent "Gran Markus Jr." who died due to complications from diabetes in March 2015, not Robles.

== Death ==
Markus Jr. died on April 25, 2026, at the age of 72.

== Championships and accomplishments ==
- Consejo Mundial de Lucha Libre (CMLL)
  - CMLL World Tag Team Championship (1 time) – with El Hijo del Gladiador
  - CMLL World Trios Championship (1 time) – with El Hijo del Gladiador and Dr. Wagner Jr.
  - Mexican National Heavyweight Championship (3 times)
  - Mexican National Tag Team Championship (1 time) – with Rayo de Jalisco Jr.
- Comision de Box y Lucha D.F.
  - Distrito Federal Heavyweight Championship (1 time)

== Luchas de Apuestas record ==
Winner (wager)	Loser (wager)	Location	Event	Date	Notes
José Torres (hair)	Tony Benetto (hair)	Monterrey, Nuevo León	Live event	N/A	
El Satánico (hair)	Tony Benetto (hair)	N/A	Live event	N/A	
El Faraón and Ringo Mendoza (hair)	Tony Benetto and Herodes (hair)	Mexico City	Live event	June 27, 1980	
Halcón Ortiz (hair)	Tony Benetto (hair)	Mexico City	Live event	April 30, 1982	
Ringo Mendoza, César Curiel and Rey Salomón (hair)	Tony Benetto, Herodes and Adorable Rubi (hair)	Mexico City	Live event	December 10, 1982	
Halcón Ortiz (hair)	Tony Benetto (hair)	Mexico City	Live event	November 28, 1983	
Ringo Mendoza (hair)	Tony Benetto (hair)	Mexico City	Live event	September 1984	
Gran Markus Jr. (mask)	Gran Markus (hair)	Monterrey, Nuevo León	Live event	1989	
Mil Máscaras (mask)	Gran Markus Jr. (mask)	Naucalpan, State of Mexico	Live event	June 29, 1997	(Note: Match also included Tinieblas)
Gran Markus Jr. (hair)	Brazo de Oro (hair)	Mexico City	42. Aniversario de Arena México	April 24, 1998	
Brazo de Plata (hair)	Gran Markus Jr. (hair)	Mexico City	Live event	May 29, 1998	
Atlantis (mask)	Gran Markus Jr. (hair)	Guadalajara, Jalisco	Live event	July 19, 1999	
Rayo de Jalisco Jr. (mask)	Gran Markus Jr. (hair)	Guadalajara, Jalisco	Live event	January 30, 2000	
La Parka (mask)	Gran Markus Jr. (hair)	Nuevo Laredo, Tamaulipas	Live event	July 17, 2000	
Gran Markus Jr. (hair)	Veneno (mask)	Mexico City	Homenaje a Dos Leyendas	March 17, 2002	
Gran Markus Jr. (hair)	Veneno (hair)	Mexico City	Live event	November 20, 2002	
Pierroth Jr. (hair)	Gran Markus Jr. (hair)	Mexico City	Homenaje a Dos Leyendas	March 21, 2003	
Loco Zandokan II (hair)	Gran Markus Jr. (hair)	Guadalajara, Jalisco	Live event	June 10, 2007	
