= Paco Alonso =

Mexican wrestling executive (1954–2019)

Personal information
- Born: September 19, 1952 Mexico City, México
- Died: July 6, 2019 (aged 66)

Professional wrestling career
- Ring name(s): Francisco Alonso Lutteroth; Paco Alonso
- Debut: 1975

Francisco Alonso Lutteroth (September 19, 1952 — July 6, 2019), commonly referred to as Paco Alonso, was the owner of the professional wrestling promotion Consejo Mundial de Lucha Libre (CMLL) from 1987 until 2019. Alonso was the grandson of CMLL founder, Salvador Lutteroth, who founded the promotion as Empresa Mexicana de Lucha Libre (EMLL; Mexican Wrestling Enterprise) in 1933.

== Career ==
Paco Alonso was the son of Elsa Lutteroth Camou, the daughter of Salvador Lutteroth, who founded the promotion under the name La Empresa Mexicana de Lucha Libre (EMLL; Mexican Wrestling Enterprise). Alonso began working for EMLL in 1975, around the same time as Salvador Lutteroth's son, Salvador Lutteroth Jr., who took control of the promotion. Over the next twelve years, Alonso worked in a promotional capacity while Lutteroth Jr. ran the business end. Lutteroth Jr. would transfer full control and ownership of EMLL to Alonso upon retiring in 1987. In 1991, the company was renamed Consejo Mundial de Lucha Libre (CMLL; World Wrestling Council).

Alonso was relatively reclusive from the public eye and gave few interviews during his time in charge of CMLL. It is estimated that he was responsible for cumulatively drawing over 80,000,000 fans throughout his career at CMLL, based on running an average of 24 shows a week each, and an attendance average of 2,000 per show. Alonso was inducted into the Wrestling Observer Newsletter Hall of Fame Class of 2008, receiving 73% of a needed 60% vote on the ballot. Along with Martín Karadagian, he was one of only two inductees for the year.

Alonso's leadership style was described as "hands off" as it related to creative direction of the company, normally content to leave the matchmaking to his booking team and focus more on the business end of CMLL. Alonso also had a reputation for holding a grudge against certain wrestlers that he felt had betrayed him, particularly those who left CMLL to form rival promotion AAA, having banned both Octagón and Konnan from ever returning to CMLL, and even refused to acknowledge the death of former CMLL booker turned AAA founder and promoter Antonio Peña in 2006. There was also a falling out between Alonso and El Hijo del Santo that led Alonso to decree that none of CMLL's working partners were to use El Hijo del Santo on their shows, and when International Wrestling Revolution Group used El Hijo del Santo anyway, Alonso broke off a seven-year working relationship with the promotion.

Following his death in 2019, CMLL was briefly controlled by Alonso's daughter, Sofía, before control of the promotion was ultimately turned over to Salvador Lutteroth III just a short time later.

== Awards and accomplishments ==
- Wrestling Observer Newsletter awards

- Wrestling Observer Newsletter Hall of Fame (Class of 2008)
