= Salvador Lutteroth =

20th-century Mexican wrestling promoter

Salvador Lutteroth González (21 March 1897 – 5 September 1987) was a Mexican professional wrestling promoter of the mid-twentieth century. Lutteroth's organization, Empresa Mexicana de Lucha Libre (EMLL), was the dominant Mexican wrestling promotional enterprise from its founding in 1933 until Lutteroth left the company in the 1950s. Under its current name of Consejo Mundial de Lucha Libre (CMLL), it is, to date, the longest-running active professional wrestling promotion in the world presenting three weekly shows. Lutteroth was known as the father of Mexican professional wrestling or lucha libre and, in his position as promoter and booker of the dominant promotion, was the most powerful man in Mexican wrestling, and one of the most powerful wrestling executives in the world. He was, in large part, responsible for the widespread fame of the most famous Mexican professional wrestlers of the mid-twentieth century, such as Octavio Gaona, the first Mexican wrestler to win the middleweight championship of the world by defeating Gus Kallio, Carlos Tarzán López, El Santo, Gory Guerrero, René Guajardo, Karloff Lagarde, Enrique Llanes, and the international league wrestler Medico Asesino, Rito Romero, Dorrel Dixon and Mil Máscaras, who wrestled in the United States, Japan, and Europe.

== Early life ==
Salvador Lutteroth González was born on 21 March 1897, in Colotlán, Jalisco, though he soon moved to Mexico City, where he went to agriculture school. At age 17, Lutteroth joined the Mexican Revolution, and served as a lieutenant, and captain under the command of General Álvaro Obregón while battling against the forces of Pancho Villa, among others. By 1923, he had been promoted to First Captain, but after getting married in 1924 to Armida Camou Olea from Hermosillo, Sonora, he left the military and soon took a job in the Tax Department as a property inspector. He and his wife had four children, Salvador, Hector, Enrique, and Elsa.

By 1929, Lutteroth was relocated to Ciudad Juárez, where he was first exposed to the sport of professional wrestling. While there he began regularly attending matches at Liberty Hall in El Paso, Texas, where he became enamored with the personalities of the various competitors, most notably the Greek star, Gus Pappas.

== Wrestling career ==
Lutteroth then decided to bring this entertaining sport back to his native Mexico; and in 1933, he chartered his new company, Empresa Mexicana de Lucha Libre (EMLL), along with his financial partner Francisco Ahumada. After unsuccessful negotiations with the boxing promoters to let him use the premier National Arena, Lutteroth rented out the smaller Modelo Arena, which became the first true home of Mexican wrestling. Fans soon began to catch on to the idea of professional wrestling in Mexico; and by the first anniversary of the EMLL, Lutteroth was promoting to gates upwards of 5,000 fans.

In 1934, an American wrestler debuted in Mexico under a black, leather mask, and Lutteroth dubbed him "Maravilla Enmascarada" or "The Masked Marvel". Soon after, Lutteroth incorporated the use of other masked wrestlers into Lucha Libre, creating real-life superheroes and villains for the audience to identify with. The idea was a huge success and thus the modern era of Mexican wrestling was born. It was also around this time that Salvador Lutteroth would discover his first legitimate superstar, the masked icon El Santo, who is generally regarded as the greatest Mexican wrestler of all time.

As his fan base continued to grow, Lutteroth and his partners eventually moved to larger and more profitable venues. Through an amazing stroke of luck, Lutteroth then won 40,000 pesos in the Mexican lottery on 21 September 1934, and he immediately poured his winnings (which equates to $3,500 in today's money, but about $40,000 in relative 1934 terms) to renovate the roof and seats for his promotion. By the mid-1940s, the fan base grew so big that Lutteroth constructed the Arena Coliseo, which opened with a capacity for nearly 6,500 seats.

As television surfaced as a viable entertainment medium during the 1950s, in another stroke of luck, the personnel of the Arena Coliseo bought a lottery ticket that won first grand prize of 5 million pesos. Salvador Lutteroth had bought half of the ticket and invested the money in the construction of the new Arena México on the site of the former Arena Modelo; Lutteroth was then able to broadcast his wrestling across the nation, subsequently yielding a popularity explosion for the sport. Moreover, the emergence of television allowed Lutteroth to promote professional wrestling's first breakout superstar, El Santo, into a national pop-culture phenomenon.

The El Santo persona debuted in the early 1940s as a rudo (heel) and initially engaged in a heated feud with Lutteroth's top babyface, Tarzán López. The Mexican fanbase was so enamored with the mystique and the secrecy of his identity, however, that El Santo soon became the company's most popular performer.

In addition, Lutteroth insisted that El Santo's face remain covered by a mask at all times, even when he was not performing in the ring. Consequently, Lutteroth transformed El Santo into a mega-babyface; and for the next three decades he would serve as the preeminent face of EMLL while he also acted in scores of action-adventure motion picture films, which were hugely popular at the time. As a result, El Santo quickly grew into one of Mexico's most popular national celebrities of the 20th century, while the sport of Lucha Libre thus received an unparalleled degree of mainstream attention.

Following the mammoth success of El Santo, Lutteroth then frequently pushed additional masked superstar characters, such as the Black Shadow, the Blue Demon, Mil Máscaras, and the Villanos (among others). To this day, Mexican professional wrestling remains associated with high-flying masked superstars, with Rey Mysterio, Jr., Psicosis, Silver King, and La Parka representing the latest generation of masked luchadores.

The Lutteroth Family continues to serve as promoters of professional wrestling while steering the EMLL organization. In addition to his stable of emmascarados, Lutteroth also built a roster of performers, including the likes of Gory Guerrero, Cavernario Galindo, Tarzán López, Perro Aguayo, René Guajardo, Dorrel Dixon, Mil Máscaras, Rito Romero, Médico Asesino, Sugi Sito and others, while holding a virtual monopoly on the country's wrestling landscape. Moreover, EMLL achieved international recognition for presenting a distinctive in-ring wrestling style that featured high-risk maneuvers and superior work rate in contrast to the increased brawling style that was employed in the U.S. Consequently, Mexican lucha libre (along with Japanese puroresu) eventually gained world renown as a significant foreign alternative to American-style professional wrestling.

== Later years ==
By the mid-1950s, an aging Lutteroth began to cede control of the EMLL to his son Salvador "Chavo" Lutteroth II, who commanded the same level of respect from the wrestlers. Obtaining the recognition from the National Wrestling Alliance (NWA), for the welterweight and light-heavyweight world titles for Mexico, which brought him great pride as a promotion in that time was done without television because of the mayor of Mexico City, Ernesto Uruchurtu, banned the wrestling matches from being televised, and yet ticket sales at the arena averaged 90% with a maximum capacity of 16,500 seats; wrestlers were brought from Spain, England, Argentina, France, Japan, Korea, and Jamaica among others. As a result, on 16 January 1975, NWA Light Heavyweight Champion Ray Mendoza broke away from the new EMLL management, and with the backing of arena promoters Francisco Flores and Benjamin Mora Jr., started a competing federation known as Lucha Libre Internacional, S. C., which has since become known as the Universal Wrestling Association(and the eventual home of longtime champion El Canek).

Salvador Lutteroth Jr. retired in 1987, after which his grandson Paco Alonso assumed control of EMLL. The promotion remains the world's oldest wrestling federation and has continued to compete with the UWA and Antonio Peña's AAA promotion. Lucha Libre, characterized by its fast-paced and athletic style, is among the most popular forms of entertainment in Mexico, alongside soccer and baseball.

== Championships and accomplishments ==
- National Wrestling Alliance
  - NWA Hall of Fame (Class of 2013)
- Wrestling Observer Newsletter
  - Wrestling Observer Newsletter Hall of Fame (Class of 1996)
