= Enter the Drag Dragon =

- Directed by: Lee Demarbre
- Written by: Mark Pollesel
- Starring: Sam Kellerman; Jade London; Matt Miwa; Lloyd Kaufman
- Cinematography: Randy Smith; Petr Maur; Robert Patterson
- Edited by: Lee Demarbre
- Music by: Dave Bignell; John Carroll
- Production company: Odessa Filmworks
- Release date: January 27, 2023 (Mayfair Theatre)
- Running time: 99 minutes
- Country: Canada
- Language: English

Enter the Drag Dragon is a Canadian action comedy film, directed by Lee Demarbre and released in 2023. Billed as "world’s first ever drag queen, martial arts, comedy", the film centres on Crunch, a drag queen and amateur detective in Ottawa who is drawn into a strange criminal underworld of construction goons, anti-gay Christian vigilantes and an Aztec mummy, when asked by a client to help find a lost dog.

Crunch is portrayed by three different actors, Sam Kellerman, Jade London and Matt Miwa, over the course of the film, with the narrative rationale being that he is hit by a car more than once and has to have his face reconstructed by plastic surgeons.

The film's cast also includes B-movie filmmaker Lloyd Kaufman in a small supporting role as a villainous construction foreman.

The film premiered on January 27, 2023, at Ottawa's Mayfair Theatre, before opening on a tour of various independent and repertory cinemas across Ontario in March, including the Fox Theatre in Toronto, the Apollo Cinema in Kitchener, the Sudbury Indie Cinema Co-op in Sudbury, the Gateway International Film Festival in North Bay, and the Playhouse Cinema in Hamilton.

== Critical response ==
Jim Slotek of Original Cin rated the film "Z-plus", writing that "you'll know whether you want to see Enter the Drag Dragon if you’ve enjoyed the work of John Waters or Troma’s Lloyd Kaufman, of The Toxic Avenger fame.

Richard Crouse rated the film three and a half stars, writing that "Enter the Drag Dragon knows who its audience is. It is an anarchic, queer gorefest that owes a debt to everyone from Bruce Lee and Russ Meyer to Luis Buñuel and RuPaul. Demarbre is obviously a student of Midnight Madness genre, and delivers, for better and for worse, a movie that simultaneously pays homage to the form while reinventing it for a new generation."
