= Dead On =

Dead On may refer to:

- Dead On: Relentless II, a 1992 thriller film
- Dead On: The Life and Cinema of George A. Romero, a 2008 documentary film
