= Smash Cut =

- Theatrical release poster
- Directed by: Lee Demarbre
- Written by: Ian Driscoll
- Produced by: Robert Menzies
- Starring: David Hess; Sasha Grey; Michael Berryman; Ray Sager; Herschell Gordon Lewis
- Cinematography: Jean-Denis Ménard; Karl Roeder
- Edited by: Lee Demarbre
- Music by: Michael Dubue
- Production companies: Odessa Filmworks; Zed Filmworks
- Distributed by: Imagination Worldwide LLC; Shriek Show
- Release dates: 18 July 2009 (Fantasia); 29 August 2009 (FrightFest)
- Running time: 79 minutes
- Country: Canada
- Language: English
- Budget: CA$400,000

Smash Cut is a 2009 Canadian slasher film directed and edited by Lee Demarbre, and produced by Robert Menzies. Starring David Hess, Sasha Grey, Michael Berryman, Ray Sager and Herschell Gordon Lewis, the plot follows a struggling filmmaker who finds that practical effects are much easier to come by.

== Plot ==
Television reporter April Carson turns to the services of private investigator Isaac Beaumonde to find her missing sister, a stripper known as Gigi Spot. Carson assumes a role in a horror movie in the process, eventually learning that the director, Able Whitman, is not only the culprit, but that he has rendered her sister's body into props.

Whitman requires more "props" for his film, meaning more body parts, which in turn requires a killing spree. Meanwhile, Beaumonde pursues an increasingly deadly and grisly case.

== Cast ==
- David Hess as Able Whitman
- Sasha Grey as April Carson
- Michael Berryman as Philip Farmsworth Jr.
- Ray Sager as Reverend Ezekial Boone
- Herschell Gordon Lewis as Fred Sandy
- Jesse Buck as Isaac Beaumonde
- Jennilee Murray as Georgina Carson / Gigi Spot
- Michael Dubue as Alan Dackman
- Barry Blake as Armand Parys
- Peter Michael Dillon as Oswald "Ozzie" Kohlberg
- Rusty Nails as Kohlberg / Oswald

== Production ==
Director Lee Demarbre cast cult horror actors David Hess (The Last House on the Left), Michael Berryman (The Hills Have Eyes) and Ray Sager (The Wizard of Gore). Herschell Gordon Lewis, considered the inventor of the splatter film genre, appears in the film's opening, advising the audience to "watch if you must". The film was the first non-pornographic role for adult film performer Sasha Grey.

Investors were concerned that Smash Cut would be hindered by the proposed Income Tax Amendments Act, 2006 law (Bill C-10) that could restrict tax benefits for films whose content the federal government deemed objectionable. These concerns were particularly prompted by the casting of Grey, but Demarbre retorted, "I don't want to make a porn movie. I want to make a movie with Sasha Grey. I want to take her right out of the porn genre."

Principal photography took place from 9 May to 4 June 2008 in Ottawa, Ontario, at area locations including the Mayfair Theatre and Rockland.

== Release ==
Original poster for Smash Cut

Smash Cut premiered at the Fantasia International Film Festival in Montreal on 18 July 2009. It was followed up on 29 August at the London FrightFest Film Festival in the United Kingdom. The film was released direct-to-DVD.

== Critical reception ==
Critic Todd Brown wrote in Screen Anarchy that the film was "a campy dose of low budget splatter" and "[i]f you aren't inclined towards early splatter pics, you're going to be bored. There's really no way to take it seriously outside the context of its tradition." Writing for Home Theater Info, critic Douglas MacLean wrote that the film "occupies the nadir of the film industry," consisting of "ultra cheap effects and one take shots that provide no time for artistry or nuance."
