= Lee Demarbre =

Canadian cult film maker

- Born: Lee Gordon Demarbre; 8 March 1972 (age 54); Chicoutimi, Quebec, Canada
- Education: Carleton University
- Occupation: Film director
- Years active: 1998-present
- Spouse: Cheryl Demarbre
- Website: https://web.archive.org/web/20110928204217/http://www.odessafilmworks.com/

Lee Gordon Demarbre (born 8 March 1972) is a Canadian cult film maker. As the president and key person in the Ottawa, Ontario based Odessa Filmworks production company, he has led the creation of several internationally shown films such as Harry Knuckles and the Pearl Necklace and Jesus Christ Vampire Hunter.

Born in Chicoutimi, Quebec, Demarbre graduated from St Matthew Catholic High School in Orleans, Ontario in 1990 then graduated from Carleton University's film studies programme. In 1998, his short film trailer martial arts movie spoof Harry Knuckles garnered attention and led to longer form versions featuring the Harry Knuckles character. This led to a debut full-length feature film, Jesus Christ Vampire Hunter which featured many of the actors from the earlier Harry Knuckles films.

Prior to his full-time commitment with Odessa, Demarbre worked for Ottawa's ByTowne Cinema. He programs films for another Ottawa cinema, the Mayfair Theatre.

In January 2007, Demarbre directed Odessa's project The Dead Sleep Easy, filmed on location in Mexico and starring Ian Hodgkinson. His movie Smash Cut was released in 2009 after post-production from July 2008.

He is also the host of the weekly Ottawa film talk radio program Drunken Master Revue on CKCU-FM. He also presents "Saturday Night Sinema", which is a monthly showcase of rare or classic cult film prints at the Mayfair Theatre.

== Filmography ==
Film	Year
Jesus Christ Vampire Hunter	2001
Harry Knuckles and the Treasure of the Aztec Mummy	2002
Harry Knuckles and the Pearl Necklace	2004
Bzzzzzzzz	2005
The Dead Sleep Easy	2007
Vampiro: Angel, Devil, Hero	2008
Smash Cut	2009
Stripped Naked	2009
Summer's Moon	2009
Enter the Drag Dragon	2023
