= Dave Courtney =

English author and gangster (1959–2023)

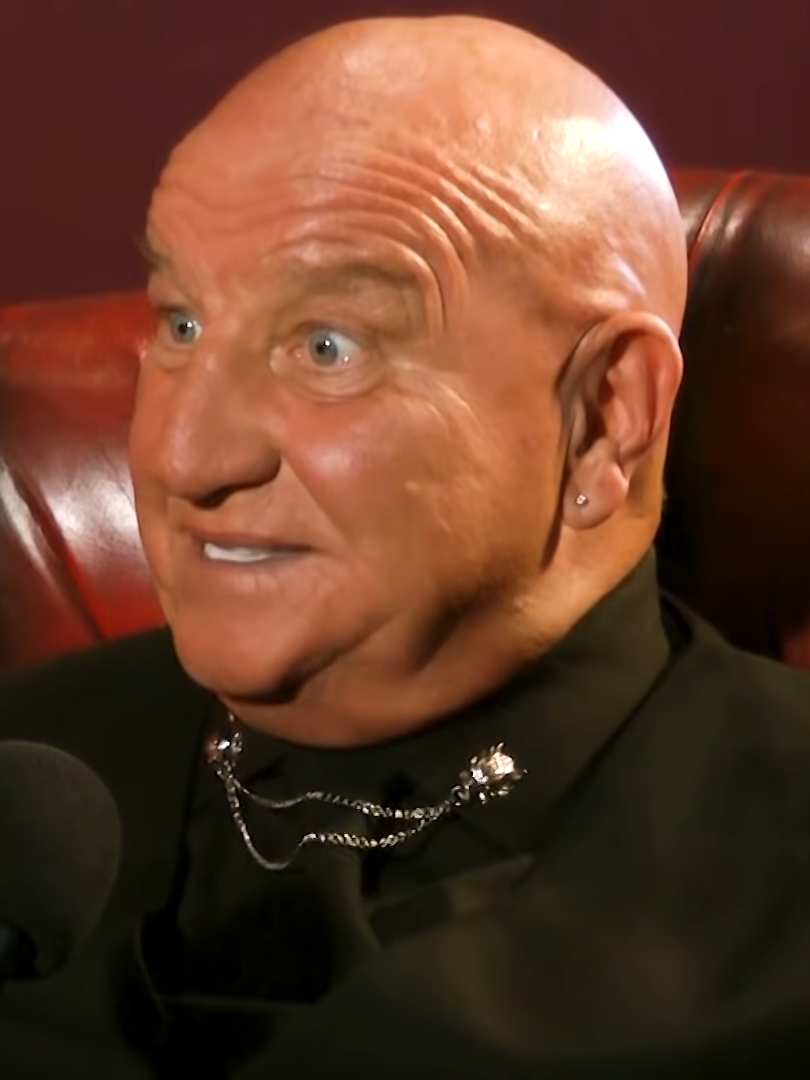
- Dave Courtney in 2019
- Born: David John Courtney; 17 February 1959; Forest Hill, London, England
- Died: 22 October 2023 (aged 64); Plumstead, London, England
- Occupations: Author; actor
- Website: davecourtney.com

David John Courtney (17 February 1959 – 22 October 2023) was an English self-proclaimed gangster who became both an author and an actor.

== Early life ==
Courtney was born in Forest Hill, London. He went to Adamsrill primary school in Sydenham, South East London.

Courtney often bragged about supposed connections with gangsters such as Reggie Kray and Lenny McLean, although he was nine years old when Kray was imprisoned. He also claimed to have been involved in debt-collecting, minding clubs, assault, contraband, and murder. He spent time in Belmarsh Prison as a high-security prisoner, as described by ex-prison guard Jim Dawkins in his book The Loose Screw.

Courtney claimed to have been shot, stabbed, had his nose bitten off, and stated that he has had to kill to stay alive. He also said that a car crash he was involved in on the M20 was an attempt on his life by "someone who had a grudge against him".

His claims of criminal activity have come under scrutiny, and the veracity of many has never been proven.

== Author ==
Courtney published six books: Stop the Ride I Want to Get Off, Raving Lunacy, Dodgy Dave's Little Black Book, The Ride's Back On, F**k the Ride, and Heroes & Villains. In his book F**k the Ride, Courtney claimed to have been found not guilty in 19 separate trials.

=== Published works ===
- 1999: Stop the Ride I Want to Get Off
- 2000: Raving Lunacy
- 2001: Dodgy Dave's Little Black Book
- 2003: The Ride's Back On
- 2005: F**k the Ride
- 2006: Heroes & Villains
- 2008: The British Crime and Prison Quiz Book (with Jim Dawkins)

== Acting ==
Largely making a living from television documentaries and personal appearances, Courtney ran his own website, was involved in charity work and worked on the films Six Bend Trap and Clubbing to Death alongside Craig Charles and Huey Morgan. Courtney was featured in the 2008 film The Dead Sleep Easy, filmed on location in Mexico.

He also starred in and produced his own film, Hell to Pay (2005), and took on the leading role of Mad Dave opposite Manish Patel in the low-budget British film Triads, Yardies and Onion Bhajees (2003).

Courtney worked with Director Liam Galvin on two DVDs – Dave Courtney's Dodgy DVD and Dave Courtney Even Dodgier – both released by Gangster Videos. He collaborated again with Liam Galvin on the 2010 film Killer Bitch and the 2016 film Mob Handed.

Courtney appeared in the film Mother's Child (2020), as club owner Mr Townsend alongside Alex Reid. He made his final cinematic appearance in 2022, portraying John Saviour in Legacy.

=== Selected filmography ===
- 1990: The Krays – Bill
- 1998: One in Something – Man in Lift
- 2000: Dave Courtney's Underworld – Himself
- 2003: Triads, Yardies and Onion Bhajees – Mad Dave
- 2004: The Baby Juice Express – Baxter
- 2005: Hell to Pay – Dave Malone
- 2006: Six Bend Trap – Gordy Metcalf
- 2007: The Dead Sleep Easy – Tlaloc
- 2008: Clubbing to Death – Harry Dench
- 2010: Killer Bitch – Dave Courtney
- 2011: Rule Britannia – Himself (Episode: "Fraud")
- 2014: Full English Breakfast – Dave Bishop
- 2016: Gangsters Gamblers Geezers – Terry
- 2016: Mob Handed – The Tank Killer

== Legal issues ==
In June 2004, Courtney was cleared of beating his girlfriend Jennifer Lucrea Pinto during a row over her lesbian lover.

In January 2009 he was given an 18-month conditional discharge at Bristol Crown Court, on a charge of possessing live ammunition without a firearms certificate. His defence of not knowing that the single live pistol round was live rather than a stage prop prompted Judge Ticehurst to comment, "It perhaps undermines your street credibility and your stage performance that you cannot distinguish between a real round and a fake round. But perhaps that's not for me to say."

In May 2009, Courtney filed for bankruptcy, reportedly owing £400,000 to creditors, including taxes of £250,000.

On 29 July 2009, he was arrested and charged with possession of a prohibited weapon, specifically a Brocock Air Cartridge pistol, and possession of a firearm whilst being a prohibited person. The Brocock pistol, which fired projectiles using pre-charged gas cartridges, was previously a legal air-weapon in the UK but concerns over the "ease" with which these types of gun could be converted into real firearms led to them being banned. After Courtney spending time on remand in HMP Belmarsh, a jury at the Old Bailey took two hours to find him not guilty on all charges on 10 December 2009.

== Personal life ==
Courtney often referred to himself as Dave Courtney OBE, the suffix standing for One Big Ego. His house in Plumstead, called Camelot Castle, was decorated with Union Jack flags and the cross of St George, a painted depiction of himself as a knight and a large knuckle duster, alongside a band of supporting knights that included Lenny McLean, the Kray twins, Joey Pyle, Al Capone, John Gotti, Ronnie Biggs, Freddie Foreman, Roy Shaw, Howard Marks and Charlie Richardson.

== Death ==
On 22 October 2023, Courtney was found dead at his home Chestnut Rise, Plumstead, having shot himself. He was 64.
