= The Dead Sleep Easy =

2007 film by Lee Demarbre

- Directed by: Lee Demarbre
- Written by: Ian Driscoll
- Produced by: Robert Menzies
- Starring: Ian Hodgkinson; Dave Courtney; Ana Sidel; Martin Kove
- Music by: Michael Dubué
- Distributed by: Odessa Filmworks; Zed Filmworks
- Release date: 22 September 2007 (Calgary International Film Festival)
- Country: Canada
- Language: English
- Budget: CAD 250,000

The Dead Sleep Easy is a 2007 Canadian drama film, a co-production of Odessa Filmworks and Zed Filmworks produced on location in Guadalajara, Jalisco, Mexico. Its tagline is "When you're this far south, sometimes it's better to be dead than alive."

== Plot ==
The story concerns a one-time Mexican wrestler known only as The Champ (Ian Hodgkinson) who becomes employed by a Mexican organised crime gang after he kills an opponent whose uncle is a mob leader. After witnessing a massacre of illegally smuggled migrants into the United States, The Champ decides to seek redress for this crime.

== Cast ==
- Ian Hodgkinson – The Champ
- Dave Courtney – Tlaloc
- Ana Sidel – Maya
- Martin Kove – Bob DePugh
- Phil Caracas – Carlito
- Alex Lora
- Aaron Katz – Minuteman
- Talia Russo – Bunny
- Pedro Fendez – Hector

== Distribution and release ==
The film has had numerous special screenings:

- 22 September 2007: Calgary, Calgary International Film Festival
- 8 February 2008: Victoria (British Columbia) Film Festival
- 15 February 2008: Toronto
- 22 February 2008: Ottawa
- 13 March 2008: Montreal
- 15 March 2008: Philadelphia, Pennsylvania, Backseat Film Festival
- 20 March 2008: Dawson City, Yukon, International Short Film Festival
- 27 March 28 March 2008: Hollywood, California, Ricardo Montalbán Theatre

The film was given a DVD release on 5 March 2009 through Anchor Bay Canada.
