= Six Bend Trap =

- Directed by: Mike McCarthy
- Written by: Mike McCarthy
- Produced by: Geoff Stalker; Heidi Boulton-Stalker
- Starring: Martin Owen; Dave Courtney; Cathy Barry; Thomas Craig; Lisa Riley; Paul Usher
- Cinematography: Steve O'Brien
- Edited by: Frank Saul
- Release dates: 16 April 2006 (Riverside Stadium); 16 March 2007 (United Kingdom)
- Running time: 135 minutes
- Country: United Kingdom
- Language: English

Six Bend Trap (Note: Later retitled Thugs, Mugs and Dogs for the DVD release) is a 2006 independent comedy crime film written and directed by Mike McCarthy in his directorial debut. The story centres on the world of greyhound racing, where three friends become embroiled in a feud between a powerful businessman and an ex-greyhound trainer.

The film was the first independent high definition film made in the United Kingdom, funded completely by the Middlesbrough-based Ironopolis Film Company. Director McCarthy and producer Stalker conceived the idea for a film set in Middlesbrough after a chance meeting in an Arizona restaurant, aiming to "give people a better impression of Teesside".

The film was shot in six weeks on location in Middlesbrough and Saltburn-by-the-Sea, with a budget of £4.5 million. An additional scene was filmed at Peterborough Greyhound Stadium.

The film was shown at the 2006 Marché du Film.
