= Vampiro =

Canadian professional wrestler (born 1967)

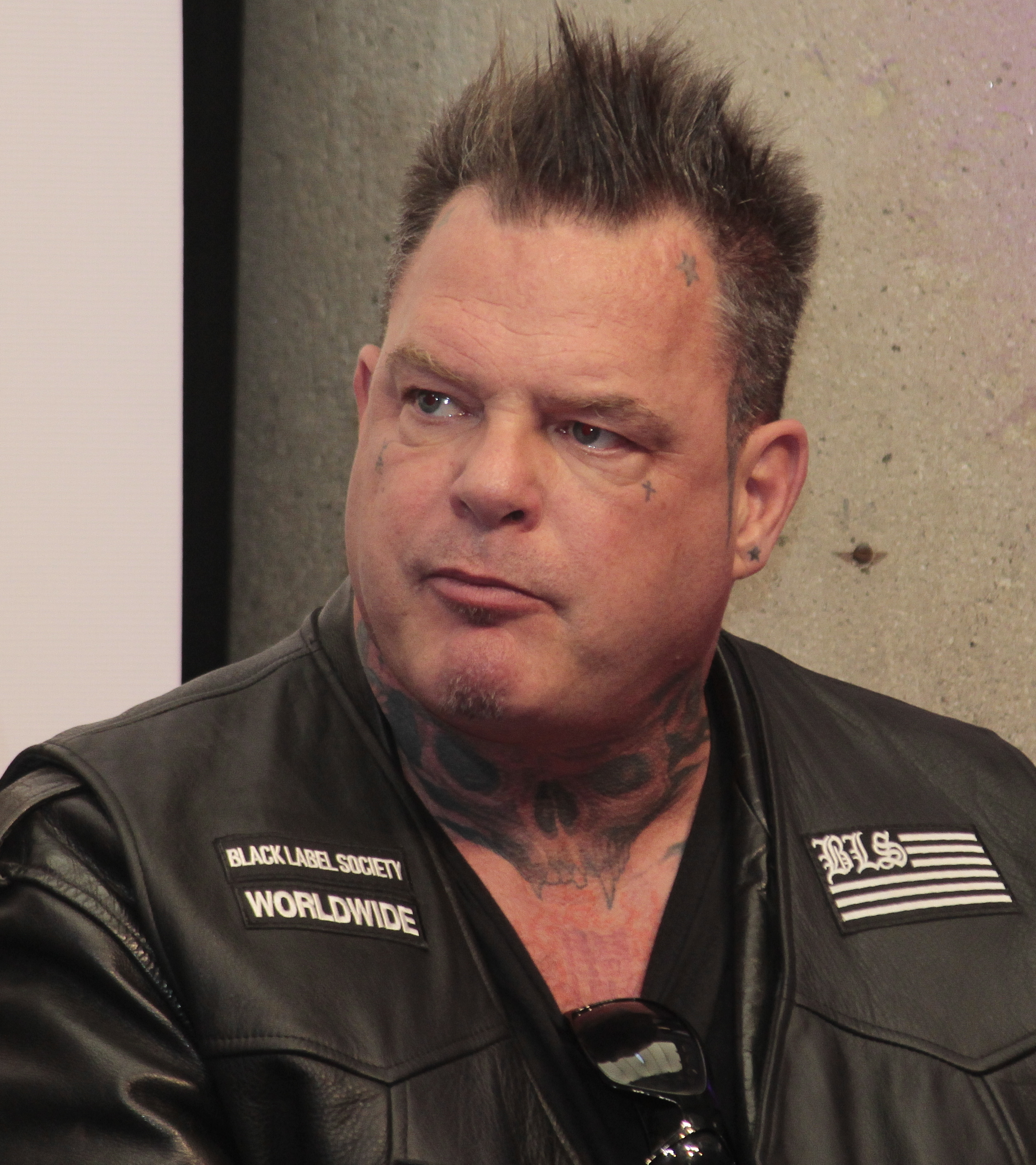
- Vampiro in 2018

Personal information
- Born: Ian Richard Hodgkinson; May 31, 1967 (age 59) Thunder Bay, Ontario, Canada

Professional wrestling career
- Ring name(s): El Vampiro (El) Vampiro Canadiense; Gene Anderson; Ian Richards; Vampiro; Vampiro Canadiense Casanova; Vampiro Casanova
- Billed height: 6 ft 2 in (1.88 m)
- Billed weight: 250 lb (113 kg)
- Billed from: Thunder Bay, Ontario, Canada; Toronto, Ontario, Canada; Mexico City, Mexico; Guadalajara, Mexico
- Trained by: Abdullah the Butcher
- Debut: 1984
- Retired: April 17, 2026

Ian Richard Hodgkinson (born May 31, 1967), better known by his ring name Vampiro, is a Canadian retired professional wrestler. He is best known for his work in Lucha Libre AAA Worldwide (AAA), Juggalo Championship Wrestling (JCW) where he was a three-time JCW Heavyweight Champion, World Championship Wrestling (WCW), where he held the WCW World Tag Team Championship with The Great Muta, and Consejo Mundial de Lucha Libre (CMLL). He is also known for his time in Lucha Underground, where is a color commentator. Hodgkinson is also member of the citizen crime patrol organization Guardian Angels, acting as head of the group's chapter in Mexico City.

In his professional wrestling career, Hodgkinson is a five-time World Champion having won the WWC Universal Heavyweight Championship once, the UWA World Heavyweight Championship once in addition to winning the JCW Heavyweight Championship three times.

== Early life ==
Hodgkinson used to be a bodyguard for the pop group Milli Vanilli. Prior to wrestling, Hodgkinson was an ice hockey goaltending prospect who was drafted by the Kingston Canadians, now known as the Kingston Frontenacs, of the Ontario Hockey League, part of the Canadian Hockey League, in the 10th round, 138th overall.

== Professional wrestling career ==
=== Early career (1984–1991) ===
Hodgkinson got his start in the business working for International Wrestling out of Montreal, Quebec. He often set up the ring before events and would train with the wrestlers before their matches. He made his debut as a jobber in 1984 at the age of 16 with little training, although he has credited Abdullah the Butcher as his trainer. He wrestled under the names Ian Richards and Gene Anderson during this time.

=== Consejo Mundial de Lucha Libre (1991–1998) ===
After a few years in Montreal, in 1991, Hodgkinson headed down to Mexico City, looking for work in one of Mexico's premier wrestling promotions, Consejo Mundial de Lucha Libre. He met with Paco Alonso and Antonio Peña, who took him as a joke because of his unique look (he had long dreadlocked blue hair and several tattoos). They decided to throw him in the ring as Vampiro Canadiense (Canadian Vampire) because he told them he liked vampires. To their surprise, with his very limited moveset that only consisted of punches, kicks, and headbutts, he became an overnight sensation, as his rock star appearance and natural good looks caught on with the young Mexican women in the audience.

In 1992, Vampiro would be part of multiple hair vs hair matches. The first of which would be on March 21 defeating Bestia Negra II. Throughout the months Vampiro would beat Rick Patterson, Pirata Morgan, Aaron Grundy and Sangre Chicana in hair vs hair matches. In late 1992, Vampiro participated in the CMLL World Heavyweight Championship tournament and reached the semi-final before being defeated by Black Magic.

In early 1993, Vampiro teamed up with Pierroth Jr. to take part in the CMLL World Tag Team Championship tournament and progressed to the final where the two would take on Dr. Wagner Jr. and El Canek in a best two out of three falls match. Going into the last match between the two teams where drawing with one win each, Dr. Wagner Jr. and El Canek would win the last match and therefore the vacant CMLL World Tag Team Championship. In the first round of the Gran Prix 1994 he lost to Yamato. In mid to late 1994, Vampiro would begin to team up with Pegasus Kid, along with El Rayo de Jalisco Jr, in the final of the Trios Tournament. The trio would lose to El Dandy, El Texano and Silver King. Vampiro and Pegasus Kid later fell to El Texano and Silver King in the quarterfinals of the CMLL World Tag Team Championship number one contendership tournament. Vampiro would go on to team up with Apolo Dantés and lost to Dr. Wagner Jr. & Pierroth Jr. in the semi-final of the CMLL World Tag Team Championship number two contendership tournament.

In July 1995, Vampiro reached the final of the CMLL International Gran Prix before being defeated by Headhunter A. In what was perhaps the biggest match of his career to this point, he took on Apolo Dantés in a best out of three falls match for the CMLL World Heavyweight Championship.

In 1996, Vampiro would leave CMLL to join other top Mexican promotions such as International Wrestling Revolution Group (IWRG), Lucha Libre AAA World Wide (AAA) and Promo Azteca (AZTECAS). However, in 1998 he would return to CMLL and would take part in the CMLL World Trios Championship tournament and Gran Prix 1998, ultimately winning neither. His last match for CMLL for many years would take place on December 11, 1998.

While working in Mexico, Vampiro began a real-life feud with fellow CMLL headliner Konnan. Konnan had been the top star in the promotion prior to Vampiro's arrival and did not take well to his superstardom. The feud stems from Vampiro being offered a part in a Mexican soap opera, when the producers ended up changing their mind at the last minute as they learned that his command of the Spanish language was poor. They went with Konnan - a fluent Spanish speaker, instead. Vampiro considered that Konnan had sabotaged his chance to parlay his ring success into mainstream stardom, as Konnan did become a mainstream star in Mexico as a result of the role. The rivalry lasted for several years until the two resolved their differences whilst working in WCW, where they became business associates.

=== Universal Wrestling Association (1991–1993, 1995) ===
On October 19, 1991, Vampiro would team up with Villano III to defeat Dos Caras and El Canek in a CMLL and UWA joint promotion event. In 1991 he would continue to take part in CMLL and UWA joint promotion events and in 1992 he debuted for Universal Wrestling Association in a single promotion setting. On January 31, 1993, Vampiro defeated El Canek in a two out of three falls match to become the UWA World Heavyweight Champion. He would defend his Championship over the course of 1993 in both single promotion and joint promotion events. He would lose the championship to El Canek on December 19, 1993, holding the championship for almost a year, this would also be his last match for UWA.

He returned for an appearance on September 8, 1995 in a tag match just before the promotion went under.

=== Wrestle Association R (1993–1998) ===
On October 3, 1993, Vampiro would debut for Wrestle Association R defeating Top Gun. In June 1994, Vampiro would start on a two-month tour of Japan where he won almost all his matches and also took part in a tag team tournament where he teamed up with Lionheart and The Warlord and would be knocked out in the first round. On his second tour of Japan, between the months September and October, Vampiro would once again win the majority of his matches. He would also team up with Bob Backlund and Dos Caras to take on Hiromichi Fuyuki, Gedo and Jado for the WAR World Six-Man Tag Team Championship, which Vampiro's team lost. Vampiro would also sporadically take part in WAR events and his last match came on December 4.

=== World Championship Wrestling (1998–2001) ===
In 1998, after spending nearly his entire career to that point in Mexico, Vampiro was signed by WCW. His first match was on the June 29, 1998, episode of WCW Monday Nitro, defeating Brad Armstrong. He would not return to WCW until the March 18, 1999 episode of WCW Thunder, when he defeated Prince Iaukea.

Later that year, he formed a stable with the Insane Clown Posse (ICP) and Raven called 'The Dead Pool' (initially called 'The Necro-Ward'). Even though the stable was short-lived, they gained popularity and had a heated feud with Eddie Guerrero, Rey Mysterio Jr., and rival Konnan.

Vampiro then feuded with Berlyn. The feud began when Vampiro beat Berlyn in the WCW World Title tournament on Nitro. To exact revenge later in the night, Berlyn cost Vampiro his match against Buff Bagwell and, as a result, Vampiro was eliminated from the tournament. This feud led to the 1999 Mayhem event, where the two fought in a Dog Collar match and Vampiro made Berlyn submit to the Camel Clutch.

Vampiro later brought The Misfits into WCW, and began a feud with Oklahoma and "Dr. Death" Steve Williams. Vampiro and Dr. Death then faced off at Starrcade, with the stipulation that if Vampiro won, he would get five minutes in the ring against Oklahoma. After Williams was disqualified, Vampiro had his match with Oklahoma. Surprisingly, Oklahoma was able to mount a bit of offense, until Vampiro took Oklahoma's cowboy hat and then pinned him following the Nail In The Coffin.

In early 2000, he formed an alliance with Sting, as the "Brothers in Paint," after he helped Sting to defeat Lex Luger in a lumberjack match. This did not last long, with Vampiro turning on Sting by attacking him during a match on the April 10, 2000 episode of WCW Monday Nitro, thus becoming a heel and joining The New Blood. At Spring Stampede 2000, Vampiro cost Sting the United States Championship in a match against Scott Steiner when he pulled Sting underneath the ring. They feuded throughout the spring, with Sting getting the upper hand on Vampiro in nearly all their encounters. This set up the Human Torch match, in which Vampiro won by setting Sting on fire. Vampiro then focused on The Demon due to his defection from the ICP formed stable, "The Dark Carnival." He kidnapped his fiancée, Asya, in a skit resembling the 1988 film Spoorloos. Afterward, he challenged him to a Graveyard Match, which sparked the return of Sting.

Vampiro entered the vacant WCW United States Title tournament, losing to The Great Muta. He later joined Muta to attack Ernest 'The Cat' Miller. Vampiro won his first and only title in WCW with The Great Muta, by defeating KroniK in Vancouver, British Columbia, Canada on August 13, 2000. This reign was very short lived, however, as they lost the Tag Team Championship the very next night to Rey Mysterio Jr. and Juventud Guerrera in Kelowna, British Columbia, Canada. Vampiro later turned his back on Muta, setting up a 3 Way match at Fall Brawl with himself, Sting and Muta, which was won by Sting. Vampiro then took time away from the sport as his wife had a baby.

He returned a month later, where he defeated Crowbar in a Hardcore Match. Vampiro then challenged Mike Awesome at Halloween Havoc, losing via pinfall after a top rope Awesome Bomb. He was put out with a broken neck and did not recover before WCW was purchased by the World Wrestling Federation. Thus, his final WCW appearance was on the November 1, 2000, episode of WCW Thunder when he teamed up with Jeff Jarrett to take on Sting and Mike Awesome, which led to a loss for Jarrett and Vampiro after Awesome performed a running powerbomb on Vampiro and pinned him.

Hodgkinson has claimed that he was hospitalized during Vince McMahon's purchase of World Championship Wrestling. Hodgkinson was informed that WWF creative team had no plans for him and would not pick up his contract following the purchase. He had also claimed that he planned on leaving WCW before he broke his neck.

=== Return to CMLL (2001–2005, 2007) ===
With WCW out of business Vampiro headed back to CMLL and returned to action in June, 2001. In 2002, Vampiro would appear on several Pay-per-views and mostly teamed up with top CMLL name Shocker. On September 13, at CMLL 69. Aniversario, Vampiro and Shocker took on Los Guerreros del Infierno for the CMLL World Tag Team Championship and lost. Vampiro's last match for CMLL for two years came on April 3, 2005, where Shocker would defeat him. In 2007, Vampiro would return to CMLL for a second time where he competed for only a few months.

=== Xtreme Pro Wrestling (2001–2002, 2008) ===
Hodgkinson had a short stint in the American hardcore promotion Xtreme Pro Wrestling. Hodgkinson had a notably stiff match with Kaos during XPW's Cold Day in Hell.

=== All Japan Pro Wrestling (2001, 2006–2007) ===
On August 26, 2001, Vampiro would start his first tour of All Japan Pro Wrestling, having a 5-month run in the promotion. He quickly formed a heel tag-team alliance with George Hines, both of them younger AJPW midcarders seeking to rise up the ranks in the promotion, often calling out veteran wrestlers in their promos and Vampiro in particular criticizing American wrestling promotions like WCW. Vampiro and Hines would participate in a handful of TV tapings from August to December 2001 and two pay-per-view appearances, winning most of their televised matches. Vampiro would leave AJPW by mid December 2001 and return to the independent circuit. A few weeks later, Hines would go on to win the 2002 New Year's Battle Royal and its trophy on January 2, 2002, which aired two days later on the January 4 edition of AJPW TV.

Vampiro would go on two more tours of AJPW one in September 2006 and the second April 2007. In his last match for the promotion, Vampiro teamed up with The Great Muta to take on Taiyo Kea and Toshiaki Kawada for the World Tag Team Championship and lost.

=== World Wrestling Council (2002) ===
In 2002 Vampiro Toured in Puerto Rico for Puerto Rican Promotion World Wrestling Council (WWC) Where he won the WWC Universal Heavyweight Championship once.

=== Total Nonstop Action Wrestling (2003) ===
On September 17, 2003, Vampiro made his TNA debut costing Raven a Hair vs Hair" match against Shane Douglas. On September 19, Vampiro defeated CM Punk in an “Open Challenge” match. Then on October 1, Vampiro teamed with Sinn and Slash to face 3Live Kru (Konnan, Ron Killings, BG James) with the match ending in a DQ. The next week, Vampiro attacked Raven and tried to hang him but Raven was saved by the Gathering. The following week, Vampiro and Slash defeated CM Punk & Julio Dinero. On October 29, Vampiro faced Raven in a “Blood Gallows of Retribution” match where he lost. This was Vampiro's final match with TNA.

=== Lucha Libre AAA Worldwide (2005–2013, 2015–2020, 2022-present) ===
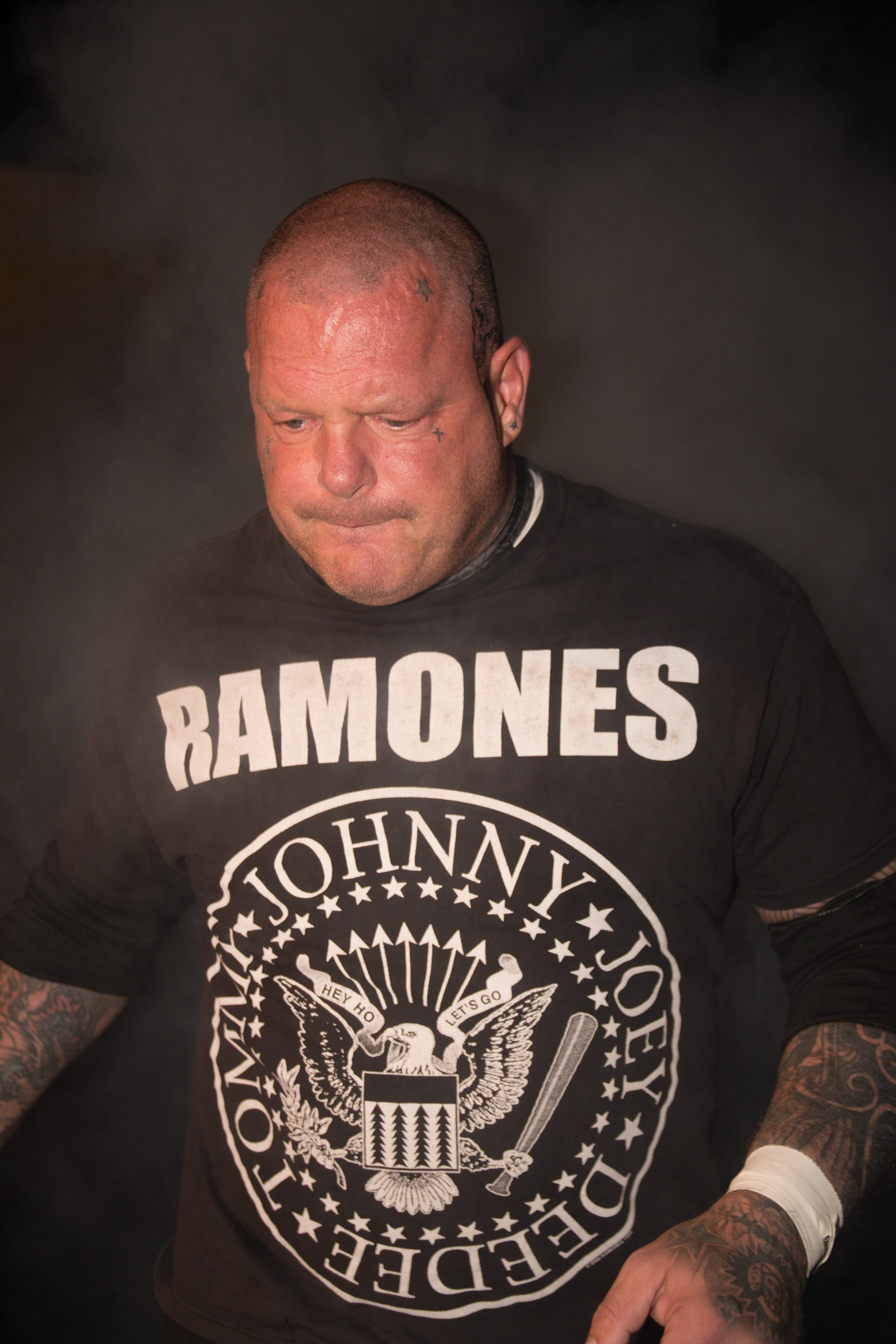
Vampiro in 2015 at a LuchaTO show.

In 2005, he jumped from CMLL to their rival promotion AAA with Shocker and various other CMLL talents. While at AAA, both he and Konnan held booking positions. During that time, he stated that he had no plans to return to TNA or work for WWE. He stated in interviews with the UK's Power Slam Magazine that he had no objection to joining TNA - although he suspected it would not happen due to the presence of Sting on their roster. On April 3, 2005, Vampiro returned to the AAA ring in a six-man tag match. Vampiro would team up with Shocker to help him deal with Abismo Negro and Cibernético after Cibernético attacked Shocker's father. In his two years with AAA, Vampiro would mainly appear on TV show tapings and rarely competed at house shows.

In April 2008, Vampiro made his return to AAA by challenging El Mesias to a match at TripleMania XVI. The match took place on June 13, 2008, in Mexico City, Mexico. The two fought each other in a Hardcore match which ended in a draw. Vampiro defeated Konnan at Rey de Reyes (2009) with the help of Marco Corleone. At Triplemania XVII Vampiro represented Team AAA in a match where they defeated Konnan's La Legión Extranjera to regain control over AAA and force Konnan out of the company. On April 17, 2010, Vampiro turned rudo and aligned himself with El Zorro of La Legión Extranjera. On August 15, 2010, at Verano de Escandalo Vampiro unsuccessfully challenged Dr. Wagner Jr. for the AAA Mega Championship in a three-way match, which also included Silver King. After not appearing for the promotion again for four months, Hodgkinson gave his notice and quit AAA on December 20, 2010.

In January 2011, Vampiro was a guest at WrestleReunion 5 in Los Angeles, California.

Vampiro returned to AAA on December 16, 2011, at Guerra de Titanes, saving El Mesías from La Sociedad and pledging his loyalty to the promotion. Vampiro then started feuding with La Sociedad member Chessman. On October 7 at Héroes Inmortales, Vampiro and Joe Líder defeated Abyss and Chessman to win the AAA World Tag Team Championship. On December 2 at Guerra de Titanes, Vampiro lost his hair to Chessman in a six-way steel cage Lucha de Apuestas, which also included Cibernético, Dr. Wagner Jr., L.A. Park and El Hijo del Perro Aguayo. On May 22, 2013, Vampiro and Líder were stripped of the AAA World Tag Team Championship.

On May 24, 2015, Vampiro, along with Matt Striker, served as one half of the English language commentators for Lucha Libre AAA World Wide's Lucha Libre World Cup internet pay-per-view.

On February 17, 2017, Vampiro was named AAA's Director of Talent.

In the summer of 2017, Taya was stripped of her AAA Reina de Reinas Championship for an unknown reason. She later posted a comment on Twitter saying she was "backstabbed by AAA" and announced that she was no longer a part of the AAA Roster. At a TV taping, Sexy Star returned and defeated Big Mami, Lady Shani, Faby Apache, Goya Kong and La Hiedra for the title. Taya later stated she had lost all respect for Sexy Star which started a shoot feud between Johnny Mundo (Taya's husband) and Taya and Kevin Kross. With Mundo and Vampiro having heated conversations backstage, Vampiro chose Texano Jr. to face Mundo for AAA Mega Championship, with Mundo coming out victorious. At a Triplemanía XXV press conference, Vampiro announced that Mundo would face El Hijo del Fantasma and Texano in a Tables, Ladders and Chairs match for the AAA Latin American, World Cruiserweight and Mega Championships.

In May 2020, he announced he would leave AAA.

=== Wrestling Society X (2007) ===
On January 26, 2007, he was featured in a pilot for a new wrestling show produced for MTV called Wrestling Society X. He competed in a 10-man Battle Royal Death match, eventually securing one of two contracts earning him a shot at the inaugural Wrestling Society X Championship against 6-Pac (Sean Waltman). He won the WSX Championship, on the February 6th episode, after sending Waltman into an exploding coffin with a Tombstone piledriver.

Vampiro was involved in a what MTV claimed was a controversial angle which led to MTV canceling the fourth WSX show, due to air on Tuesday, February 20. In the (pre-taped) show, he was the recipient of a fireball to the face thrown by Ricky Banderas which resulted in Vampiro's head momentarily catching fire. The footage has since been leaked onto the internet. Later in his debut WSX match, Ricky Banderas defeated Vampiro to claim the WSX Championship.

In addition to appearing as an on-screen talent, Vampiro held a backstage position as the main booker.

=== Juggalo Championship Wrestling (2000, 2011–2013, 2021–2022, 2025–2026) ===
On February 23, 2011, Vampiro officially came out of retirement and returned to Juggalo Championship Wrestling as both a wrestler and a company consultant. He raised hopes of developing talent, taking the company international, and, more specifically, bringing it to Latin America. At Monster's Island, he was placed in a rivalry with giant wrestler Kongo Kong. Raven interfered in the match and attacked Vampiro, resulting in him losing by pinfall. Vampiro lost his rematch with Kong at Juggalo Championship Wrestling's first internet pay-per-view Hatchet Attacks. On August 14, Vampiro took on Corporal Robinson for the JCW Heavyweight Championship at Bloodymania V which Vampiro lost. Vampiro returned August 12, 2012, defeating Colt Cabana at Bloodymania 6. On August 11, 2013, Vampiro made his return at Bloodymania 7 teaming with 2 Tuff Tony defeating The Boogeyman and Kongo Kong.

On April 17, 2026, Vampiro would have his retirement match on Strangle-Mania: Viva Las Violence at Horseshoe Las Vegas in Paradise, Nevada. The match would be a three way match against him, PCO and Big Vito and would be the main event for the show.

=== Lucha Underground (2014–2018) ===
On September 5, 2014, it was announced Vampiro signed with Lucha Underground as the color commentator for the English and Spanish-language airings. He made his in-ring debut for the promotion at the Ultima Lucha tapings on April 19, 2015, where he was defeated by Pentagón Jr. It was revealed after the match that he is the master of Pentagon Jr. In a podcast interview with Stone Cold Steve Austin, Vampiro revealed that he wasn't supposed to be Pentagon Jr's opponent at Ultima Lucha but after Pentagon Jr's original opponent backed out of the match, Vampiro went up to creative and requested to work the match with Pentagon Jr. and put him over because of how over Pentagon Jr. is with the fans despite being portrayed as a villain.

The following season Vampiro would mentor Pentagon until Ultima Lucha Dos where Pentagon (now renamed Pentagon Dark) turned on Vampiro saying that "he was the master now".

During season 3 of Lucha Underground, Vampiro started mentoring Prince Puma.

During Ultima Lucha Tres Vampiro turned on brand new champion Prince Puma during his match against Pentagon Dark, thus costing Puma his belt and his Lucha Underground career, as well as pairing him back up with Pentagon Dark.

=== National Wrestling Alliance (2023) ===
In March 2023, Vampiro made his National Wrestling Alliance (NWA) debut, when he and Blue Demon Jr. challenged La Rebelión (Bestia 666 and Mecha Wolf) for the NWA World Tag Team Championship.

On June 3 at Crockett Cup, Vampiro returned to NWA assisting La Rebelión against Flippin' Psychos (Flip Gordon and Fodder) in the second round of the Crockett Cup.

== Personal life ==
Hodgkinson grew up in a single parent home with his mother and two younger sisters. Hodgkinson is divorced from Kitsu with a daughter named Dasha, whose godfather is Norman Smiley.

He was involved in a relationship with Mexican actress Stephanie Salas and Mexican/US rock singer and songwriter Ana Sidel, co-star of the movie The Dead Sleep Easy. He has a tattoo on his left arm that reads "Mexico City", where he had many of his matches. He is fluent in Spanish.

In July 2009 Hodgkinson reportedly had a break-in at his house; he got startled and jumped 15 feet to the ground from his bedroom window, which broke his back. In a letter posted on the JCW website in 2012, Hodgkinson revealed that he had a brain tumor and stomach cancer.

Hodgkinson has stated his interest in world religions, particularly occult religions such as voodoo and vampirism. Hodgkinson also claims that two spirits from Guatemala are presently following him as the result of an unfinished ritual. Vampiro has since revealed that he eventually had an exorcism performed on him to have the spirits removed.

On July 5, 2017, Hodgkinson revealed via Facebook he has been a victim of identity theft and cyber hacking for eight years. On April 12, 2019, Hodgkinson was misdiagnosed with Alzheimer's disease.

== Other media ==
During the height of his wrestling career in Mexico, Hodgkinson starred in an action film entitled Guerrero De La Noche, which was similar to the El Santo films of the 1960s and 1970s. He has also made a cameo appearance on Vanilla Ice's Bi-Polar as well as recording an intro to Psychopathic Records Twiztid's "Maniac Killa".

Vampiro was also featured in the video game WCW Backstage Assault, Backyard Wrestling 2: There Goes the Neighborhood and Lucha Libre AAA: Héroes del Ring.

The documentary film Vampiro: Angel, Devil, Hero was produced by Odessa Filmworks and Zed Jamaica and screened in Canada on November 12, 2008.

As of 2011, Hodgkinson made occasional appearances on the Mexican show Extranormal, which deals with paranormal activities in the world. He made his acting debut in La Mujer de Judas, 2012 telenovela produced by TV Azteca. Hodgkinson also appeared on Fuse's ICP Theater as a heckler to the Insane Clown Posse.

In 2020, a Canadian documentary "Nail In The Coffin: The Fall and Rise of Vampiro" was released by Epic Pictures, featuring Vampiro and his daughter.

== Music ==
Vampiro made his debut on the album Freek Show by the band Twiztid on the track "Maniac Killa" where he recorded the introduction of the song.
On the Insane Clown Posse album Forgotten Freshness Volume 3 the spitball recording for that intro on the Twiztid album was released as one of the gag tracks on the CD.

In 2006, Hodgkinson formed the industrial metal band, Droch Fhoula. In January 2007, Carpatos Records released the band's debut maxi-single Alter Deus. A year later, in June 2008, the band released its first six-track EP under the same title as the single.

== Championships and accomplishments ==
- Lucha Libre AAA World Wide
  - AAA World Tag Team Championship (1 time) – with Joe Líder
  - Rey de Reyes (2006)
- Consejo Mundial de Lucha Libre
  - NWA World Light Heavyweight Championship^{1} (1 time)
- Federacion Internacional de Lucha Libre
  - FILL Heavyweight Championship (1 time)
- Fiend Wrestling Germany
  - FWG Championship (1 time)
- International Wrestling Association
  - IWA Hardcore Championship (4 times)
- International Wrestling Revolution Group
  - IWRG Intercontinental Heavyweight Championship (1 time)
- Juggalo Championship Wrestling
  - JCW Heavyweight Championship (3 times)
- Nu-Wrestling Evolution
  - NWE World Heavyweight Championship (1 time)
- Pro Wrestling Illustrated
  - Ranked No. 31 of the top 500 singles wrestlers in the PWI 500 in 2000
  - Ranked No. 216 of the 500 best singles wrestlers during the "PWI Years" in 2003
- Universal Wrestling Association
  - UWA World Heavyweight Championship (1 time)
- World Championship Wrestling
  - WCW World Tag Team Championship (1 time) – with The Great Muta
- World Wrestling Council
  - WWC Universal Heavyweight Championship (1 time)
- Wrestling Society X
  - WSX Rumble (shared with 6-Pac)
  - WSX Championship (1 time)

^{1}Even though CMLL still uses the NWA initials in the title's name, the National Wrestling Alliance itself no longer recognizes or sanctions the NWA World Light Heavyweight Championship since CMLL is no longer an NWA affiliated promotion.

=== Luchas de Apuestas record ===
Winner (wager)	Loser (wager)	Location	Event	Date	Notes
Vampiro (hair)	Bestia Negra II (hair)	Xochimilco, Mexico City	Live event	March 21, 1992	
Vampiro (hair)	Rick Patterson (hair)	Monterrey, Nuevo León	Live event	June 28, 1992	(Note: This was a three-way match that also involved Sangre Chicana.)
Vampiro (hair)	Pirata Morgan (hair)	Mexico City	Live event	July 17, 1992	
Vampiro (hair)	Aaron Grundy (hair)	Monterrey, Nuevo León	Live event	August 23, 1992	(Note: This was a "Relevos Suicidas" match with Vampiro teaming with Grundy against Brazo de Plata and Sangre Chicana, the team lost and had to wrestle each other as a result.)
Vampiro (hair)	Sangre Chicana (hair)	Monterrey, Nuevo León	Live event	December 10, 1992	
Vampiro (hair)	Pirata Morgan (hair)	Houston, Texas	Live event	September 1, 1998	
Vampiro (hair)	Rey Bucanero (hair)	Mexico City	Sin Piedad (2002)	December 13, 2002	
Shocker (hair)	Vampiro (hair)	Mexico City	47. Aniversario de Arena México	April 4, 2003	
Cien Caras and Máscara Año 2000 (hair)	Vampiro and Pierroth (hair)	Mexico City	Sin Piedad	December 17, 2004	
Vampiro Canadienese (hair of Joaquin Roldan)	Konnan (hair of Arturo Rivera)	Guadalajara, Jalisco	Rey de Reyes	March 15, 2009	
Chessman (hair)	Vampiro (hair)	Zapopan, Jalisco	Guerra de Titanes	December 2, 2012	(Note: This was a six-way steel cage match, which also included Cibernético, Dr. Wagner Jr., L.A. Park and El Hijo del Perro Aguayo.)
