= Jesus Christ Vampire Hunter =

2001 film by Lee Demarbre

- Directed by: Lee Demarbre
- Written by: Ian Driscoll
- Produced by: Lee Demarbre
- Starring: Phil Caracas; Jeff Moffet; Murielle Varhelyi; Maria Moulton; Tim Devries; Ian Driscoll; Josh Grace; Ivan Freud; Nicholas Edwards
- Cinematography: Lee Demarbre
- Edited by: Lee Demarbre
- Music by: Graham Collins
- Distributed by: Odessa Filmworks, Inc.
- Release dates: 10 June 2001 (premiere); 15 January 2002 (Canada)
- Running time: 85 minutes
- Country: Canada
- Language: English
- Budget: $100,000 CAD

Jesus Christ Vampire Hunter is a 2001 Canadian horror parody superhero film from Odessa Filmworks which deals with Jesus Christ's modern-day struggle to protect the lesbians of Ottawa, Ontario, from vampires with the help of Mexican wrestler and superhero El Santo. The film was written by Ian Driscoll and directed by Lee Demarbre.

Jesus Christ Vampire Hunter earned an honourable mention in the Spirit of Slamdance category at the 2002 Slamdance Film Festival.

== Plot summary ==
After a spree of vampire attacks on lesbians, Father Eustace (a Catholic priest) realizes that only Jesus Christ can fight off the vampires. Eustace sends two priests to a beach, where they inform Jesus of the problem. Three vampires, including Maxine Shreck, kill the priests, but Jesus kills two of the vampires by using the lake as holy water. Maxine escapes. Jesus goes to Ottawa, gets a haircut, and buys wood to make stakes.

Thirty atheists jump out of a car and confront Jesus, only to be easily defeated. Jesus teams up with Mary Magnum and infiltrates the hospital, where they discover that mad scientist Dr. Praetorious is performing skin transplants to make the vampires immune to sunlight. Maxine and Johnny Golgotha defeat Jesus and Mary in a rooftop battle. Mary is bitten, becoming a vampire.

Jesus calls upon a Mexican wrestler, El Santo, for help. At a nightclub, they slay dozens of vampires, but El Santo and his assistant are captured. The next day, Johnny, Maxine, and Mary capture Jesus and bring him to a junkyard where his allies are being held. Eustace is there, and he reveals that he is a vampire. A battle breaks out. Jesus simultaneously fights Dr. Praetorious at the hospital. The doctor is fatally wounded, but Jesus heals him.

At the junkyard, Eustace stabs Jesus with a stake. A bright light emerges from the wound, killing Eustace and Johnny. El Santo shields a vampire whom he loves from the light, and Jesus cures her and Mary's vampirism. To his surprise, Mary loves Maxine, so Jesus cures her too. Later, Jesus resumes preaching, asking people to think for themselves.

== Cast ==
- Phil Caracas as Jesus Christ, Vampire Hunter
- Jeff Moffet as El Santo
- Murielle Varhelyi as Maxine Shreck
- Maria Moulton as Mary Magnum
- Tim Devries as Father Eustace
- Ian Driscoll as Johnny Golgotha
- Josh Grace as Dr. Praetorious
- Jay Stone as God (voice)
- Jenny Coutts as Virgin Mary
- Ivan Freud as Narrator
- Grover Cleveland as screaming lesbian number 2
- Race Stanford Hoglund as screaming lesbian number 3
- Dom Ekstrom as Big boi

== Production ==
- Jason Haggart Lead Prop Designer
- James Dale Bush #1
- Robert Younger-Lewis Tree #1
- Dawson Wilde Really Big Boulder #1

== Reception ==
Time's Richard Corliss panned the film, finding that "the comedy is slack, the song lyrics feeble, the pace torpid". Ken Eisner of Variety took a more neutral view, finding that "the film is too silly to offend". Jason Nolan of The Harrow deemed the production "horridly wonderful", although uneven, noting that "[w]ith a film like this, you want it to be bumpy". Film Threat's Eric Campos gave the film a generally positive review. On the review aggregator website Rotten Tomatoes, 80% of 10 critics' reviews are positive.

== See also ==
- Lesbian vampire
