= Triads, Yardies and Onion Bhajees =

- Official DVD poster
- Directed by: Sarjit Bains
- Written by: Manish Patel
- Produced by: Manish Patel
- Starring: Manish Patel; Jass Bassi; Dave Courtney
- Narrated by: Jonathan Reason
- Cinematography: Sarjit Bains
- Edited by: Sarjit Bains
- Music by: Wkd Axe & Karma Sun
- Production company: GhettoVision
- Distributed by: 4 Digital Media
- Release date: 11 November 2003 (United Kingdom)
- Running time: 105 minutes
- Country: United Kingdom
- Language: English
- Budget: £1,000

Triads, Yardies and Onion Bhajees is a 2003 British crime film directed by Sarjit Bains, telling the story of a hitman working in London. The film stars real-life ex-gangster and underworld don Dave Courtney. Brainchild of Manish Patel, who plays the role of Singh, the story's protagonist, Triads, Yardies and Onion Bhajees was showcased in a BBC Two documentary on the making of the film.

The film draws upon the imagery of Hindu deity Kali, traditionally invoked to vanquish evil, with the three gangs being likened to modern-day thugees. After its Cannes showcase the film was optioned by 4 Digital Media and went on UK wide release through the independent cinema network.

== Plot ==
Triads, Yardies and Onion Bhajees is primarily an action movie but it has a mythological and spiritual vein running through it. The character of Chacha worships the Hindu goddess Kali, and a statue of Kali is shown both in his home and in his office. Chacha is seen praying to the goddess in a temple.

Chacha's influence and teachings have also influenced members of his gang. The image of Kali can be seen in the homes of his various gang members. The smoke emanating from the incense surrounding the Kali statue in the temple is deemed to be holy, and Chacha names his crime syndicate "The Holy Smokes". The film suggests that the goddess Kali is watching the proceedings unfold before her and ultimately will decide who lives and who dies.

== Cast ==
- Manish Patel as Singh
- Dave Courtney as Mad Dave
- Jass Bassi as Chacha
- Jonathan Reason as Greaves
- Peter Rnic as Big Kev
- Jamille Riverol as Tia
- Ashvin Kumar Joshi as Jaz
- Fran Labbe as Abz
- Sukie Ghajminger as Rocky
- Yasmine Maya as Trudy
- Native as Lloyd
- Charles Udemezue as Errol
- Richard Angol as Rufus
- Peter Peralta as Billy Chan
- Alex Fung as Li Fung
- Ines Boughanmi as Chacha's daughter
