= Rusty Nails (filmmaker) =

American film director

- Born: Rusty Osgood; 1966 (age 59–60)
- Occupations: Film director, producer, screenwriter, and actor

Rusty Nails (Rusty Osgood, born 1966) is an American director, writer, producer, and actor. He is best known for his feature-length B-movie Acne. Nails has also made several short films, including God is Dad, The Ramones and I, Grethel and Hansel, Animated Corpse, and Santiago vs. Wigface, which won a special recognition award.

== Biography ==
=== Early life and punk rock career ===
Rusty Nails grew up in a suburb of Boston, Massachusetts and was active in Boston's punk scene. Exposed to B-movie through the local television program Creature Double Feature, Nails became obsessed with old horror films. He made his first foray into the genre in the 1980s with his punk rock band, The Creeps, for whom he sang and about such subjects as teenage violence ("On TV") and being turned into a zombie by a virulent strain of pimples ("Acne"). Nails released music by The Creeps on his own label, Wasted Effort Records, along with other local bands like fellow punkers The Angry Kids, the busker street-pop duo Egg (whose members left to join Caroliner Rainbow and found The Presidents of the United States of America), and post-hardbore band Cabal for whom Nails also played bass.

Nails also worked as an amateur photographer and publisher, writing and contributing to numerous fanzines, and supported political causes, especially anti-racism and animal rights. Many of his lyrics he wrote for both The Creeps and Cabal reflected these values, and Wasted Effort's releases often contained information and literature from groups like People for the Ethical Treatment of Animals.

=== Film career ===
In 1991 Nails moved to Chicago to study film at Columbia College and produce several short films. He extended his stay at Colombia by several years in order to complete his first feature-length work, Acne (whose title song is performed by Nails' old punk band), a black-and-white horror film about a pair of teenagers who wake up to find themselves mutated into horribly strange creatures. Nails spent five years and $12,000 on the film, raising funds through yard sales and paying no one but the film's make-up artist $225 to create the giant volcanic pustules for which the film was named.

Nails has made various cameo appearances in print, television and film, often under a pseudonym. His likeness has been published in the Weekly World News and he was a guest on both Ricki Lake and The Morton Downey Jr. Show. In later years, Nails focused his attention toward documentary filmmaking, focusing on acts of teen violence and cult filmmakers.

In addition to directing, Nails founded the Movieside Film Festival in Chicago, which showcased independent short films and hosted guest filmmakers such as John Waters, Jim Jarmusch and George Romero.

== Acne ==
Nails wrote, directed, produced, and starred in the independent horror film Acne. Described as a tribute to French New Wave, film noir, and 1950s B-movies, the film follows two teenagers, Franny and Zooey, who develop giant, mutating pustules on their heads after drinking contaminated water. The film explores themes of teen angst, social alienation, and corporate exploitation.

Production for Acne spanned several years. It was shot on black-and-white 16mm film with a budget of approximately $12,000 to $14,000, which Nails raised through personal savings and yard sales. The film received positive coverage in independent horror circles for its DIY aesthetic and "genuine inspiration," with critics noting its blend of "no-budget goofiness" and political astuteness.

== Filmography ==
=== Director ===
- 2008 Dead On: The Life and Cinema of George A. Romero - Director
- 2002 God Is Dad - Director / Writer
- 2002 The Ramones and I - Director / Writer
- 2000 Acne - Director / Writer
- 2000 Santiago vs. Wigface - Director / Writer
- 2000 Animated Corpse - Director / Writer
- 2000 Grethel & Hansel - Director / Writer
- 2000 Blood Drinkers - Director / Writer

=== Acting Credits ===
- 2011 Fancypants as Ambulance Onlooker (uncredited)
- 2009 Smash Cut as Fred Sandy's Assistant
- 2003 Skunk Ape!? (short) as Zuffy Dortch, The Cryptozoologist
- 2000 Citizen Toxie: The Toxic Avenger IV as Kabukiman's Drinking Buddy (as Rusty Osgood)
- 1999 Terror Firmer as Frat Guy Who Offers Armpit (as Rusty Osgood)
- 1999 Acne as Zooey

=== Appearances as Himself ===
- 2006 American Stag
- 2004 Film School
