= Hell to Pay (2005 film) =

- Original video release
- Directed by: Roberto Gomez Martin
- Starring: Dave Courtney; Billy Murray
- Edited by: Brian Hovmand
- Music by: Ryan S. Jones
- Release date: 31 October 2005
- Country: United Kingdom
- Language: English

Hell to Pay is a 2005 British film by Roberto Gomez Martin, his directorial debut, about a gangster's life who is from the London East End. It is based on the semi-autobiographical story of Dave Courtney, who plays character of Dave Malone in the film.

== Plot ==
Dave Malone (Dave Courtney), a British gangster, is set up by his own brother Larry Malone (Billy Murray) to murder a rival crime boss. Dave avoids the scheme and subsequently the murder charge made against him, whilst planning to eliminate the competition and take over the lucrative London crime trade.

The oil-on-canvas depicting the crucifixion used in the film was painted by real-life East End gangster Ronnie Kray, as it was given to Dave Courtney as a present just before he died in prison.

== Cast ==
- Terry Stone ... Johnny Murphy (credited as Terry Turbo)
- Dave Courtney ... Dave Malone
- Billy Murray ... Larry Malone
- Andy Beckwith ... Detective Inspector Beek
- Francine Lewis ... Gangster's wife
- JC Mac ... Mike-stripper
- Chico Slimani ... Stripper
- Garry Bushell ... One of Larry Malone's goons
- Ian Freeman ... Cellmate
- Martin Hancock ... Martin
- Helen Keating ... Helen
- Dave Legeno ... Big Vic
- Trevor Mailey ... Hood
- Adam Saint ... Adam
- John Altman ... Policeman
- Nick Bateman ... Police officer
- Pete Conway ... Policeman
- Joanne Guest ... Policewoman
- Charlie Breaker ... Sir Charlie Malone (Uncle)

== Reviews and Ratings ==
According to the review aggregator Rotten Tomatoes, only 18% of over 250 reviewers gave the film a positive review. The websites critics note, "Worst western ever. the acting/script is hilariously bad and the plot plays like a boring history lesson", another critic "I very, very rarely fail to finish a movie, but this is one of them. I got about two-thirds through it, and I just couldn't take it any more...". This review is for a different film of the same name.

On another review aggregator, IMDb, the film received 4.1/10 stars. With almost 300 ratings, 21.7% gave the film 1/10 stars, but 20.3% of reviewers gave the film 10/10 starts. 38.1% of reviewers rated the film above 5 stars, and the other 61.9% rated the film 5 stars or below.

== Roberto Gomez Martin ==
Roberto Gomez Martin is the director of "Hell to Pay". He is a director and actor, born in London, England, in 1969.

He also helped produce the movies "The Monuments Men"(2014), "Sucker Punch"(2008), "God's Acre"(2015), and others.
