= Andy Beckwith =

English actor

Andy Beckwith is an English actor.

== Career ==
He is best known for his role as Errol in Guy Ritchie's Snatch (2000) and for his portrayal of Rorge in the HBO series Game of Thrones (2012–2014). He played the role of Clanker, a member of the Flying Dutchman's crew in the Pirates of the Caribbean franchise.

He has appeared in numerous British television and film projects, including feature films Hell to Pay (2005) and Ironclad: Battle for Blood (2014), and TV series such as EastEnders, By Any Means and Grantchester. He featured as a blind footballer in Bury It, a 2002 comedy short with Des McAleer, Clare Grogan and Steve Sweeney.

== Filmography ==
=== Film ===
Year	Title	Role	Notes
2000	Snatch	Errol	
2002	Bollywood Queen	Johnny	
2005	Unleashed	Righty	
2005	Hell to Pay	Inspector Beek	
2006	Pirates of the Caribbean: Dead Man's Chest	Clanker (Dutchman)	
2007	Pirates of the Caribbean: At World's End	Clanker (Dutchman)	
2012	Les Misérables	Innkeeper	
2014	Ironclad: Battle for Blood	Pierrepoint	
2016	The Infiltrator	Joe	
2018	Show Dogs	Berne	
2019	Once Upon a Time in London	Sonny The Yank	

=== Television ===
Year	Title	Role	Notes
2000	The Sins	Nark	1 episode ("Greed")
2000–2002	The Bill	Electrician (2000); Grant (2002)	1 episode (2000); 2 episodes (2002)
2001	Armadillo	Trev	TV film
2002	Dinotopia	Copra Carter	Miniseries
2003	EastEnders	George Peters	3 episodes
2008	Trial & Retribution	Cabbie	1 episode ("The Rules of the Game: Part 1")
2010	Whitechapel	Grave Maurice Regular	2 episodes
2011	Top Boy	Man with Baseball Bat	1 episode ("Episode 3")
2011	The Jury	Hostel Proprietor	3 episodes
2012–2014	Game of Thrones	Rorge	4 episodes
2013	By Any Means	Carl Warden	1 episode ("Episode 1")
2014	Grantchester	Tommy	1 episode ("Episode 5")
2016	NCIS	Chester Grimm	1 episode ("Return to Sender")
