= Dead On: The Life and Cinema of George A. Romero =

2008 film by Rusty Nails

- Directed by: Rusty Nails
- Produced by: Rusty Nails
- Starring: George A. Romero; Dario Argento; Quentin Tarantino; Robert Rodriguez; Stephen King; John Landis; Ed Harris; Dennis Hopper; Richard Linklater; Roger Ebert; John Carpenter; Rob Zombie; Penn Jillette; Tom Savini
- Cinematography: Jonathan Buchanan; Eric Burton; Timothy Cerjan; Matt Thiesen
- Edited by: Debbie Brockman
- Release date: July 2008 (Melbourne)
- Country: United States
- Language: English

Dead On: The Life and Cinema of George A. Romero is a 2008 documentary film directed by the filmmaker Rusty Nails. The film is about the life and career of the horror film director George A. Romero. Clips from his films are combined with interviews with Romero, his collaborators, and his admirers to show the whole story of his life. The film premiered at the 2008 Melbourne International Film Festival.

== Synopsis ==
Nails' documentary, Dead On: The Life and Cinema of George A. Romero will go over Romero's body of film work as it stands to date. The film will also examine a number of aspects of George's work, working method, and association with the independent and Hollywood film communities. Among the interviewees are Dennis Hopper, Ed Harris, Stephen King, John Carpenter, Dario Argento, Danny Boyle, John Waters, Quentin Tarantino, Richard Linklater, Penn Jillette, Roger Ebert and Tom Savini. Dead On will investigate Romero's lifelong fascination with making films.

== Production ==
The film was directed and produced by Rusty Nails, a Chicago-based filmmaker. The project was a labor of love that spanned several years. Nails, who had previously directed the documentary Acne, self-financed much of the production. He aimed to create a portrait of Romero that was more intimate and expansive than previous "making-of" featurettes, specifically wanting to highlight Romero's non-zombie films which often receive less attention.

During the production, Nails also produced a featurette titled "Stay Scared", which was included on the DVD release of Romero's Land of the Dead.

== Release and reception ==
The film premiered at the Melbourne International Film Festival (MIFF) on July 27, 2008. It was also screened at various genre festivals, including the Festival of Fear in Toronto.

Critical reception for the film, while limited due to its festival circuit release, was generally positive among horror fans and critics. Dread Central praised the film during its preview screenings, noting that the interviews felt "intimate" and appreciating the director's focus on Romero's entire career rather than just the Dead trilogy.

== Cast ==
The documentary features interviews with a wide range of figures from the horror and independent film communities:

- George A. Romero
- Quentin Tarantino
- Stephen King
- John Carpenter
- Dario Argento
- Dennis Hopper
- Ed Harris
- Robert Rodriguez
- John Landis
- Tom Savini
- Roger Ebert
- Rob Zombie
- Penn Jillette
- Richard Linklater
- Debbie Rochon
