= Odessa Filmworks =

Canadian film production company

- Company type: Private
- Industry: Entertainment
- Founded: Ottawa, Ontario, Canada
- Headquarters: Ottawa, Ontario, Canada
- Key people: Lee Demarbre (founder); Ian Driscoll
- Products: Motion pictures, short subjects

Odessa Filmworks is a Canadian film production company, based in Ottawa, Ontario founded by film director/producer Lee Demarbre. Odessa produced the internationally distributed feature film Jesus Christ Vampire Hunter.

== Productions ==
- 1998: Harry Knuckles (short film, trailer spoof)
- 1999: Harry Knuckles and the Treasure of the Aztec Mummy
- 2001: Jesus Christ Vampire Hunter (feature film)
- 2002: Where's Your Bobber? (documentary)
- 2003: Harry Knuckles and the Siege of the Leopard Lady (short film)
- 2004: Harry Knuckles and the Pearl Necklace (feature film)
- 2008: The Dead Sleep Easy (feature film, co-produced with Zed Filmworks/Zed Jamaica)
- 2008: Vampiro: Angel, Devil, Hero (documentary, co-produced with Zed Filmworks/Zed Jamaica)
- 2009: Smash Cut
- 2023: Enter the Drag Dragon
