= Mayfair Theatre, Ottawa =

Motion picture venue in Ottawa, Ontario

Mayfair Theatre
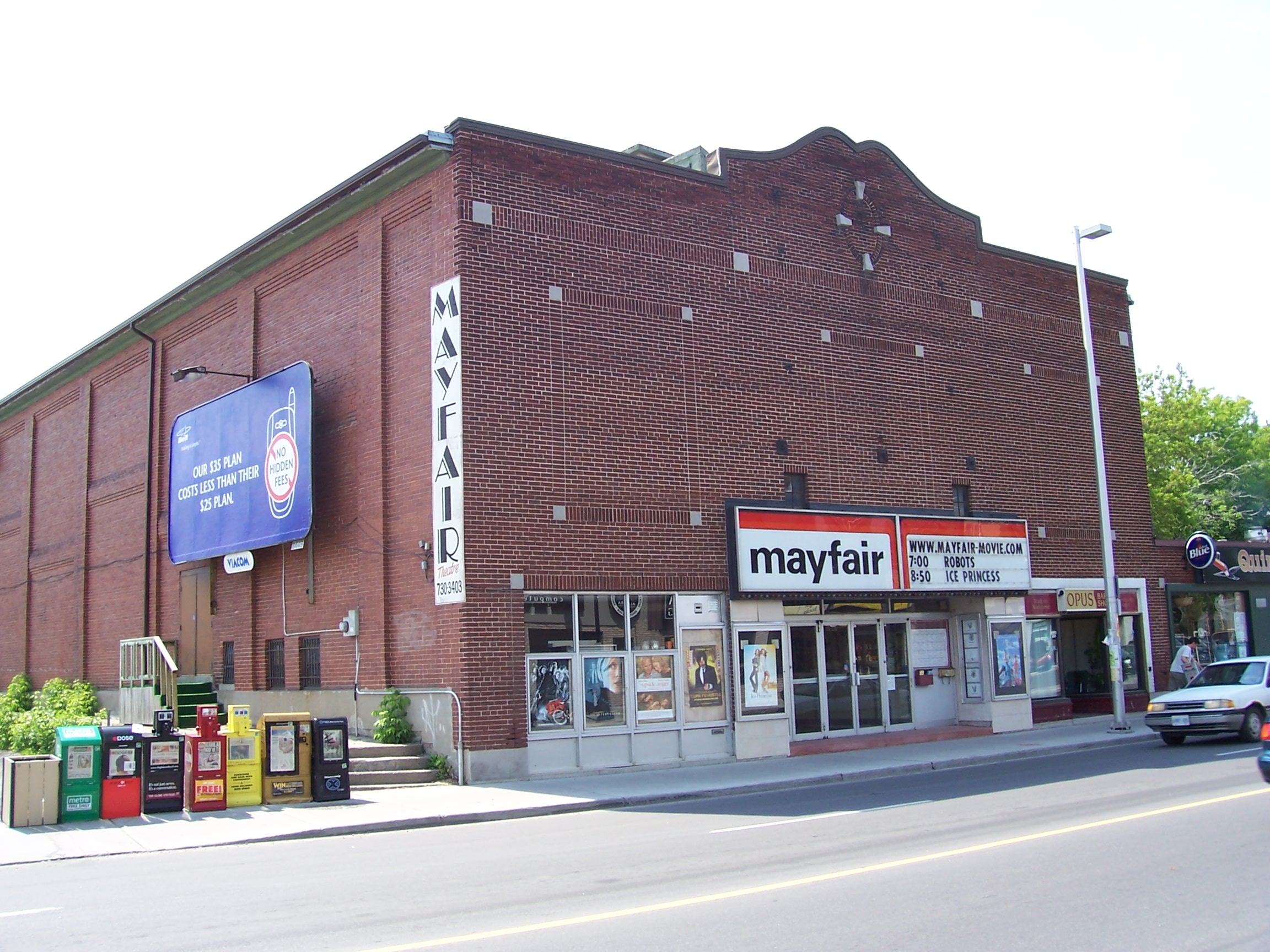
- Interactive map of Mayfair Theatre
- Address: 1074 Bank Street; Ottawa; Canada
- Location: Ottawa, Ontario, Canada
- Coordinates: 45°23′41″N 75°41′02″W
- Capacity: 325
- Type: Cinema

Construction
- Opened: 5 December 1932

Website
- mayfairtheatre.ca

The Mayfair Theatre is a single screen cinema located in Ottawa, Ontario, Canada. It is Ottawa's oldest active movie theatre, operating since 1932. It operates as an independent repertory cinema. The theatre's programming includes Ottawa premieres, independent, international, second-run, and classic films. It is noted for its diverse programming, special events like silent films with live music, frequent screenings of The Rocky Horror Picture Show, and world record number of screenings of The Room.

== Description ==
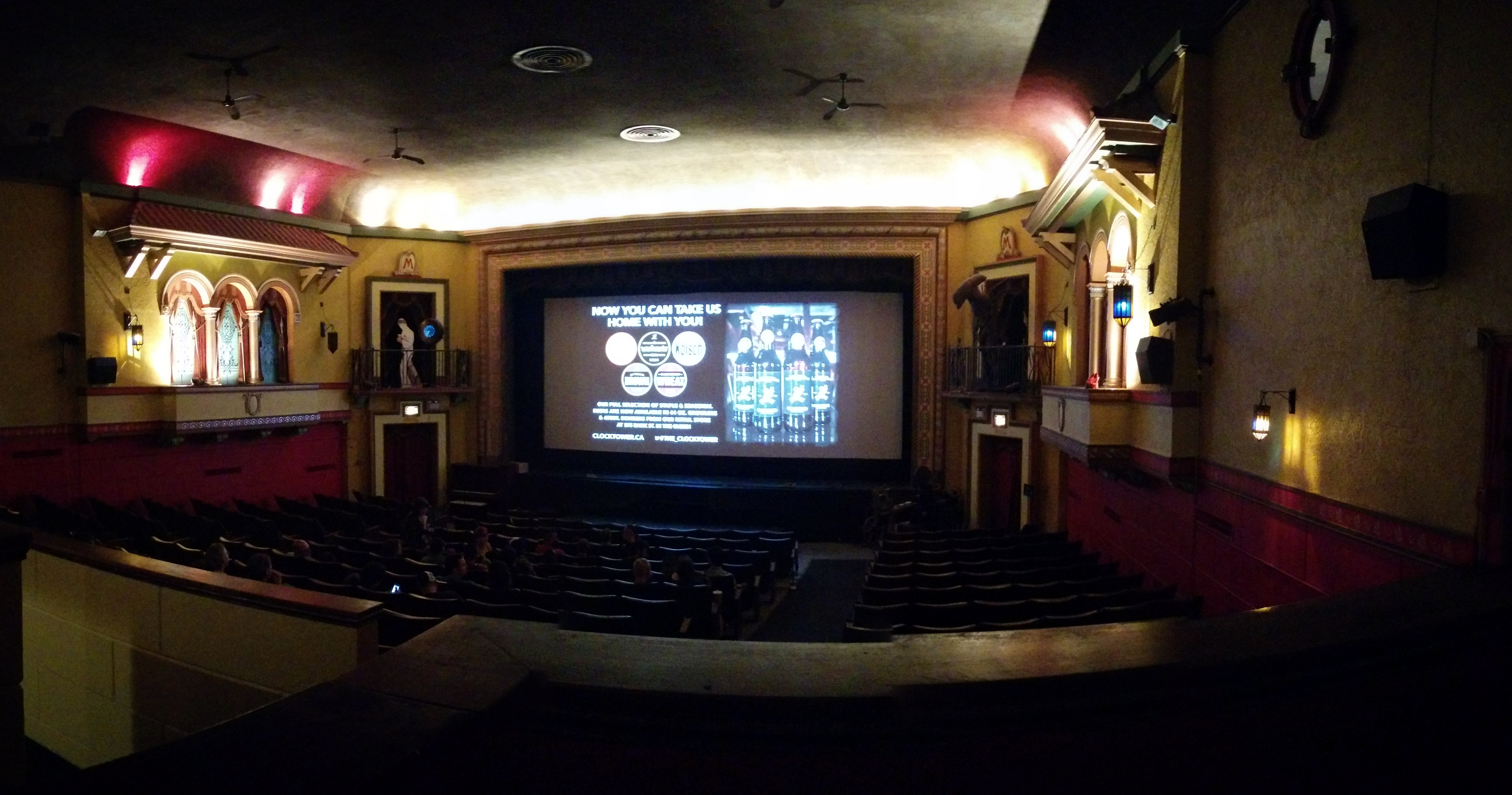
Interior of Mayfair Theatre

The Mayfair is a surviving atmospheric cinema of the Spanish Revival form, the second theatre house of this kind to be constructed in Ottawa. Interior features include four faux-balconies, two of which feature clay-tile canopies. Other significant features include stained-glass windows, a proscenium arch, a painted ceiling, decorative plastering and wrought ironwork. The Mayfair has retained the theatre clock used since its inception, a unit which features blue illuminated numbering.

== History ==
=== 1932 to 1970s ===
Fred Robertson, a retailer from Almonte, was the Mayfair's original owner. The Mayfair opened on 5 December 1932 with its showings of The Blue Danube. Adult admission prices were 15 cents for matinees, 25 cents for evening performances, with each child admitted for ten and 15 cents respectively. After The Blue Danube completed a three-day run, the Mayfair presented its first double bill with Bring 'Em Back Alive and X Marks the Spot. At the outset, the theatre's sound system was supplied by Northern Electric while Montreal-based Canadian Theatre Supply provided the projection and stage equipment.

For the first half century of its existence, the cinema remained under Robertson family ownership. The theatre later operated as a second-run cinema for numerous years. In the late 1970s the Mayfair concentrated on pornographic films, a phase which lasted less than two years.

=== 1980s ===
In October 1981, the Mayfair adopted a repertory format and in the following month Keith Davidson became theatre manager. The Mayfair became known for its economical double features which were introduced in June 1982 for five days each week, excluding Sundays and Mondays when Chinese-language films would be presented. The Mayfair's ownership then consisted of several investors, most of whom were Ottawa-based.

The Mayfair cancelled a planned showing of Videodrome in April 1983 when police threatened the theatre with obscenity charges. A handful of citizens, including Maude Barlow, objected to the violent content of the film which was approved by the Ontario Board of Censors and was previously shown without incident in Nepean, Ontario.

Director Michael Rubbo rented the theatre for three days in early 1986 to conduct a "four-waller" promotion for his film The Peanut Butter Solution which had fared poorly in the English Canadian market. While in Ottawa, Rubbo used the opportunity to conduct auditions for his then-upcoming film Tommy Tricker and the Stamp Traveller at local schools.

In 1986, major renovations resulted in new concession stand and box office spaces, while 492 wider seats replaced the original set of approximately 600 seats. In 1988, the Mayfair's regular admission price was $5, or $3.50 for those with theatre memberships which were available for $5 per year, or $3 per year for students. During that time, membership numbered more than 5,000.

=== 1990s ===
Double features became available on all days as of 1 April 1990 as the Chinese-language films were discontinued. Sunday afternoon double features were also introduced at that time. Regular prices for the double features were $5.50, or $4 for those who obtained a $6 annual membership. Featured films were predominantly hit American productions with a minority of classic and international films.

Tom Bergin became manager in the early 1990s when Davidson left to pursue other interests.

=== 2000s ===
In August 2008, local media indicated that the theatre would close effective 30 November 2008, the date at which the theatre would terminate its membership program. The City of Ottawa declared the theatre building as a heritage site under the Ontario Heritage Act on 8 October 2008, a designation which prohibits outright demolition of the building.

Public and community concern over the closure of the Mayfair and interest in its heritage value resulted in the formation of the Friends of the Mayfair Theatre, a loosely organized community group that claimed several hundred members.

In November 2008, a new partnership consisting of filmmakers Lee Demarbre and Ian Driscoll, projectionist and film conservator Paul Gordon and film scholar John Yemen announced that they had signed a ten-year lease with owner Stephen Ng. The new owners renovated the facility with new seating, some couches in the balcony, a digital video projection system, a new 16mm projector, a Dolby Digital sound system for the 35mm projectors, and a long play tower system. Seating capacity was reduced from 492 to 343. The Mayfair reopened on 2 January 2009 with the film Metropolis accompanied by short subjects from local filmmakers. The theatre's reopening was accompanied with a renewed emphasis on its repertory role. During this relaunch month, thirteen Ottawa premieres were presented while double bills were now limited to Tuesday nights and occasionally other nights. Midnight screenings on Friday and Saturday nights were also introduced.

In July 2009 two of the founding members of the new partnership, John Yemen and Paul Gordon left the group to pursue other projects. John Yemen was the individual who sent the city a proposal for heritage designation in the summer of 2008. The makeup of the partnership is now Lee Demarbre (programmer), Cheryl Demarbre, Ian Driscoll, and Josh Stafford.

=== 2010s ===
Currently, the Mayfair's programming includes family matinees, independent films, cult films, Ottawa premieres, local films, festivals, and the late-late night Saturday Night Sinema presentations. It also became the main venue for the Ottawa International Writers Festival in spring of 2010, hosting readings and lectures. The theatre also reports continued success with its annual Halloween screenings of The Rocky Horror Picture Show.

=== Mayfair Orleans ===
The Mayfair opened a three-screen cinema in Orleans on 2 December 2011. It was situated at the former Empire Six theatre facility. This location presented similar programming as the original Mayfair location, with some emphasis on family-oriented films. The Mayfair Orleans location closed on 13 February 2013 when its lease was cancelled due to arrears in rent.

== Projection capability ==
The following projection formats are supported at the Mayfair:

- 35 mm projector includes Dolby Digital and DTS sound capability
- 16 mm projector (Phillips/Kinoton)
- video projector (various formats)
- Digital

== See also ==
- List of Ottawa-Gatineau cinemas
- List of designated heritage properties in Ottawa
